= List of Texas railroads =

The following railroads operate in the U.S. state of Texas.

== Common freight carriers ==
=== Class I ===
- BNSF Railway (BNSF)
- Canadian Pacific Kansas City (CPKC)
- Union Pacific Railroad (UP)

=== Class II ===
There are no Class II Railroads in Texas.

=== Class III ===
- Alamo Gulf Coast Railroad (AGCR) - (Martin Marietta Inc.)
- Alliance Terminal Railroad (ATR) - (OmniTRAX)
- Angelina and Neches River Railroad (ANR)
- Austin Western Railroad (AWRR) - (Watco)
- Big Spring Rail (BSR)
- Blacklands Railroad (BLR)
- Border Pacific Railroad (BOP)
- Brownsville and Rio Grande International Railroad (BRG) - (OmniTRAX)
- CMC Railroad (CMC)
- Corpus Christi Terminal Railroad (CCPN) - (Genesee & Wyoming)
- Dallas, Garland and Northeastern Railroad (DGNO) - (Genesee & Wyoming)
- Fort Worth and Western Railroad (FWWR)

- Operates the Fort Worth & Dallas Belt Railroad (FWDB) and the Fort Worth and Dallas Railroad (FWDR)

- Galveston Railroad (GVSR) - (Genesee & Wyoming)
- Gardendale Railroad (GDR)
- Georgetown Railroad (GRR)
- Grainbelt Corporation (GNBC)
- GT Logistics
- Gulf Coast Switching (GCS)
- Hondo Railway (HRR)
- Kiamichi Railroad (KRR) - (Genesee & Wyoming)
- La Salle Railway (LSRY)
- Live Oak Railroad (LOR)
- Lubbock and Western Railway (LBWR) - (Watco)
- Moscow, Camden and San Augustine Railroad (MCSA) - (Georgia-Pacific)
- Oak Grove Railroad
- Orange Port Terminal Railway (OPT)
- Panhandle Northern Railroad (PNR) - (OmniTRAX)
- Pecos Valley Southern Railway (PVS) - (Watco)
- Plainsman Switching Company (PSC)
  - Operates South Plains Switching, Ltd
- Plainview Terminal Company (PTC)
- Point Comfort and Northern Railway (PCN) - (Genesee & Wyoming)
- Port Terminal Railroad Association (PTRA)
- Rail Logix (Frontier Logistics LP)
- Rio Valley Switching Company (RVSC) operates the Rio Valley Railroad (RVRR)
- RJ Corman Texas Line (RJCD)
- Sabine River and Northern Railroad (SRN)
- San Antonio Central Railway (SAC) - (Watco)
- San Jacinto Transportation (SJCT)
- South Plains Lamesa Railroad (SLAL)
- Southern Switching Company (SSC) operates the Lone Star Railroad (LSRR)
- Southwest Gulf Railroad (SWG) - (Vulcan Materials Company)
- Temple and Central Texas Railway (TC) - (Patriot Rail)
- Texas Coastal Bend Railroad (TCBR) - (Watco)
- Texas Central Business Lines (TCB)
- Texas City Terminal Railway (TCT) - (BNSF and UP)
- Texas, Gonzales and Northern Railway (TXGN)
- Texas & Eastern Railroad
- Texas & New Mexico Railway (TXN) - (Watco)
- Texas Northeastern Railroad (TNER) - (Genesee & Wyoming)
- Texas and Northern Railway (TN)- (Transtar)
- Texas North Western Railway (TXNW)
- Texas and Oklahoma Railroad (TXOR)
- Texas Pacifico Transportation (TXPF) - (Grupo México)
  - Operator for the Texas state-owned South Orient Rail Line
- Texas Rock Crusher Railway (TXR)
- Texas South-Eastern Railroad (TSE)
- Timber Rock Railroad (TIBR) - (Watco)
- Western Rail Road (WRRC)
- Wichita, Tillman and Jackson Railway (WTJR)

== Passenger carriers ==
=== Intercity passenger rail ===
- Amtrak (AMTK)
  - Heartland Flyer
  - Texas Eagle
  - Sunset Limited

=== Commuter rail ===
- A-train - (DCTA)
- CapMetro Rail - (CapMetro)
- Trinity Railway Express (TRE) - (DART and Trinity Metro)
- TEXRail - (Trinity Metro)

=== High speed rail ===
- Texas Central Railway (Proposed; in ROW-acquisition phase)

=== Light rail ===
- DART rail - (DART)
- METRORail - (Houston METRO)

=== Trolley and streetcar ===
- Dallas Streetcar - (DART)
- El Paso Streetcar - (Sun Metro)
- Galveston Island Trolley - (Island Transit)
- M-Line Trolley - (MATA)

=== Tourist and heritage ===
- Austin and Texas Central Railroad (ATCR) - (Austin Steam Train Association)
- Grapevine Vintage Railroad (GVRX)
- Hermann Park Railroad - (Hermann Park Conservancy)
- Historic Jefferson Railway (JCB)
- Six Flags & Texas Railroad - (Six Flags Over Texas)
- Texas State Railroad (TSR)
- Longhorn and Western Railroad - (Texas Transportation Museum)

== Defunct railroads ==
Name	Mark	System (Note: This is one or more of the Class I railroads that the railroad became part of, if any.)	From	To	Successor	Notes
Abilene and Northern Railway		CB&Q	1906	1952	Fort Worth and Denver Railway	
Abilene and Southern Railway	A&S, AS	MP	1909	1978	Missouri Pacific Railroad	
Acme, Red River and Northern Railway		SLSF	1902	1909	Quanah, Acme and Pacific Railway	
Acme Tap Railroad		CB&Q	1899	1938	N/A	
Air Line Railroad		SP	1860		Washington County Railroad	
Aransas Harbor Terminal Railway			1892	1947	N/A	
Artesian Belt Railroad		MP	1908	1920	San Antonio Southern Railway	
Asherton and Gulf Railway		MP	1909	1956	Missouri Pacific Railroad	
Asphalt Belt Railway		MP	1923	1956	Missouri Pacific Railroad	
Atchison, Topeka and Santa Fe Railway	ATSF	ATSF	1965	1996	Burlington Northern and Santa Fe Railway	
Austin Area Terminal Railroad	AUAR		2000	2007	Austin Western Railroad	
Austin Dam and Suburban Railway		MP	1895	1956	Missouri Pacific Railroad	
Austin and Northwestern Railroad	AUNW		1986	1996	Longhorn Railway	
Austin and Northwestern Railroad		SP	1881	1901	Houston and Texas Central Railroad	
Austin and Oatmanville Railway			1883	1888	N/A	
Bartlett–Florence Railway			1909	1911	Bartlett Western Railroad	
Bartlett Western Railroad			1911	1935	N/A	
Bastrop and Taylor Railway		MKT	1886	1886	Taylor, Bastrop and Houston Railway	
Beaumont and Great Northern Railroad		MKT	1905	1923	Waco, Beaumont, Trinity and Sabine Railway	
Beaumont, Sour Lake and Port Arthur Traction Company		MP	1903	1904	Beaumont, Sour Lake and Western Railway	
Beaumont, Sour Lake and Western Railway		MP	1904	1956	Missouri Pacific Railroad	
Beaumont and Saratoga Transportation Company			1905	1935	N/A	
Beaumont Wharf and Terminal Company		ATSF	1897	1957	Gulf, Colorado and Santa Fe Railway	
Belton Railroad	BRR		1960	1991	Georgetown Railroad	
Big Creek and Trinity Valley Railway			1908	1912	N/A	Three-mile lumber line, years are when reports were made
Black Bayou Railroad			1904		N/A	
Blackwell, Enid and Texas Railway		SLSF	1901	1904	St. Louis, San Francisco and Texas Railway	
Board of Trustees of the Galveston Wharves	GWF		1940			Still exists as a lessor of the Galveston Railroad
Bois d'Arc and Southern Railway	BDS		1934	1946	N/A	
Bowers and Piney Creek Railway			1889	1891	N/A	
Brazos, Santiago and Rio Grande Railroad			1865	1867	N/A	
Brownsville and Gulf Railway		MP/ NDM	1883	1906	Brownsville and Matamoros Bridge Company	
Brownsville and Matamoros Bridge Company		MP/ NDM	1909			Still exists as a joint subsidiary of the Mexican government and Union Pacific Railroad
Brownwood North and South Railway		SLSF	1910	1926	N/A	
Bryan, Brazos and Burleson Railway			1913	1941	N/A	Bryan to Laura, 27 miles, chartered to Wilcox
Buffalo Bayou, Brazos and Colorado Railway		SP	1850	1870	Galveston, Harrisburg and San Antonio Railway	
Burlington Northern Inc.	BN		1980	1981	Burlington Northern Railroad	
Burlington Northern Railroad	BN		1981	1996	Burlington Northern and Santa Fe Railway	
Burlington – Rock Island Railroad	BRI	CB&Q/ RI	1930	1964	Fort Worth and Denver Railway, Chicago, Rock Island and Pacific Railroad	
Burr's Ferry, Browndel and Chester Railway		SP	1906	1914	Texas and New Orleans Railroad	
Calvert, Waco and Brazos Valley Railroad		MP	1899	1900	International and Great Northern Railroad	
Cane Belt Railroad		ATSF	1898	1948	Gulf, Colorado and Santa Fe Railway	
Caro Northern Railway			1906	1928	N/A	
Cen-Tex Rail Link	CTE		1994	1996	South Orient Railroad	
Central and Montgomery Railway		ATSF	1877	1882	Gulf, Colorado and Santa Fe Railway	
Central Texas and Northwestern Railway		SP	1881	1901	Houston and Texas Central Railroad	
Chicago, Rock Island and Gulf Railway	RI&G, RIG	RI	1902	1948	Chicago, Rock Island and Pacific Railroad	
Chicago, Rock Island and Mexico Railway		RI	1900	1903	Chicago, Rock Island and Gulf Railway	
Chicago, Rock Island and Pacific Railroad	RI, ROCK	RI	1947	1980	Atchison, Topeka and Santa Fe Railway, Fort Worth and Denver Railway, North Central Texas Railway, Oklahoma, Kansas and Texas Railroad, St. Louis Southwestern Railway, Texas North Western Railway	
Chicago, Rock Island and Pacific Railway	RI	RI	1939	1948	Chicago, Rock Island and Pacific Railroad	
Chicago, Rock Island and Texas Railway		RI	1892	1903	Chicago, Rock Island and Gulf Railway	
Chicago, Texas and Mexican Central Railway		ATSF	1880	1882	Gulf, Colorado and Santa Fe Railway	
Choctaw, Oklahoma and Texas Railroad		RI	1901	1903	Chicago, Rock Island and Gulf Railway	
Cisco and Northeastern Railway		MP	1918	1942	N/A	
Clinton-Oklahoma-Western Railroad Company of Texas		ATSF	1927	1948	Panhandle and Santa Fe Railway	
Colorado River Western Railway	CRW	SP	1955	1958	Texas and New Orleans Railroad	
Colorado Valley Railway		ATSF	1897	1899	Panhandle and Gulf Railway	
Columbus Tap Railway		SP	1860	1866	Buffalo Bayou, Brazos and Colorado Railway	
Concho, San Saba and Llano Valley Railroad		ATSF	1909	1948	Gulf, Colorado and Santa Fe Railway	
Corpus Christi, San Diego and Rio Grande Narrow Gauge Railroad		NDM	1875	1881	Texas Mexican Railway	
Crosbyton Railway	CBYN		1990	1990	N/A	
Crosbyton–Southplains Railroad		ATSF	1910	1916	South Plains and Santa Fe Railway	
Crystal City Railroad	CYCY		1990	1995	N/A	
Crystal City and Uvalde Railroad		MP	1909	1912	San Antonio, Uvalde and Gulf Railroad	
Dallas and Cleburne Railroad		ATSF	1876	1879	Dallas, Cleburne and Rio Grande Railway	
Dallas, Cleburne and Rio Grande Railway		ATSF	1879	1880	Chicago, Texas and Mexican Central Railway	
Dallas, Cleburne and Southwestern Railway		MKT	1902	1923	N/A	
Dallas, Fort Worth and Gulf Railway		SSW	1899	1901	Dallas Terminal Railway and Union Depot Company	
Dallas and Greenville Railway		MKT	1886	1886	Missouri, Kansas and Texas Railway	
Dallas and New Mexico Railway		SLSF		1908	Gulf, Texas and Western Railway	
Dallas, Pacific and Southeastern Railway		SLSF	1889		Dallas and New Mexico Railway	
Dallas Terminal Railway and Union Depot Company		SSW	1901	1994	St. Louis Southwestern Railway	
Dallas Terminal Railway and Union Depot Company		SSW	1884	1899	Dallas, Fort Worth and Gulf Railway	
Dallas and Waco Railway		MKT	1886	1891	Missouri, Kansas and Texas Railway	
Dallas and Wichita Railroad		MKT	1871	1881	Missouri, Kansas and Texas Railway	
Dayton – Goose Creek Railway		SP	1917	1934	Texas and New Orleans Railroad	
DeKalb and Red River Railroad			1891	1899	N/A	
Denison, Bonham and New Orleans Railroad		MKT	1901	1928	N/A	
Denison, Bonham and New Orleans Railway		MKT	1888	1901	Denison, Bonham and New Orleans Railroad	
Denison and Pacific Railway		MKT	1878	1880	Denison and Southeastern Railway	
Denison and Pacific Suburban Railway		MP	1895	1966	N/A	
Denison and Southeastern Railway		MKT	1877	1880	Missouri, Kansas and Texas Extension Railway	
Denison and Washita Valley Railway		MKT	1886	1903	Missouri, Kansas and Texas Railway of Texas	
East Line and Red River Railroad		MKT (Note: The 1881 sale to the MK&T was challenged by Texas Attorney General Jim Hogg on the grounds that the MK&T did not have the right to own property in Texas, and a state government decree forfeiting the East Line and Red River's charter was ultimately upheld by the Supreme Court of Texas in 1890, forcing the line into receivership. It would be purchased by a representative of the bondholders in 1892 and resold to the SS&S in 1893.)	1871	1893	Sherman, Shreveport and Southern Railway	Sold in 1881 to MK&T, became independent again in 1892, resold in 1893
East Texas Railway		SP	1880	1881	Sabine and East Texas Railway	
East Texas Central Railroad	ETC		1996	1998	Blacklands Railroad	
East Texas and Gulf Railway			1917	1934	N/A	
Eastern Texas Railroad		SSW	1900	1921	N/A	
Eastern Texas Railroad			1860	1863	N/A	
Eastland, Wichita Falls and Gulf Railroad			1918	1944	N/A	
El Paso and Northeastern Railroad		SP	1896	1937	El Paso and Southwestern Railroad of Texas	
El Paso Northern Railway		SP	1894	1897	El Paso and Northeastern Railroad	
El Paso Southern Railway		SP	1897	1961	Southern Pacific Company	
El Paso and Southwestern Railroad of Texas		SP	1902	1961	Southern Pacific Company	
El Paso Terminal Railroad		SP	1901	1903	El Paso and Southwestern Railroad of Texas	
El Paso Union Passenger Depot Company		ATSF/ MP/ NDM/ SP	1903	1974	N/A	
Emporia and Gulf Railroad			1900		N/A	
Estacado and Gulf Railroad			1908	1911	N/A	
Floydada and Plainview Railroad	FAPR		1990	1995	Plainview Terminal Company	
Fort Worth Belt Railway	FWB	MP	1903	1978	Missouri Pacific Railroad	
Fort Worth and Denver Railway	FW&D, FWD	CB&Q	1951	1982	Burlington Northern Railroad	
Fort Worth and Denver City Railway	FW&D	CB&Q	1873	1951	Fort Worth and Denver Railway	
Fort Worth and Denver Northern Railway		CB&Q	1929	1952	Fort Worth and Denver Railway	
Fort Worth and Denver South Plains Railway		CB&Q	1925	1952	Fort Worth and Denver Railway	
Fort Worth and Denver Terminal Railway		CB&Q	1890	1952	Fort Worth and Denver Railway	
Fort Worth and New Orleans Railway		SP	1885	1901	Houston and Texas Central Railroad	
Fort Worth and Rio Grande Railway		ATSF	1885	1948	Gulf, Colorado and Santa Fe Railway	
Fort Worth Stock Yards Belt Railway		MP	1895	1903	Fort Worth Belt Railway	
Fort Worth Union Passenger Station Company		ATSF	1899	1960	Gulf, Colorado and Santa Fe Railway	
Fredericksburg and Northern Railway			1917	1942	N/A	
Gainesville, Henrietta and Western Railway		MKT	1886	1887	Missouri, Kansas and Texas Railway	
Galveston Railway	GVSR		1987	1991	Galveston Railroad	
Galveston, Beaumont and Northeastern Railway			1906		N/A	
Galveston, Brazos and Colorado Narrow Gauge Railway		ATSF	1875	1887	Galveston and Western Railway	
Galveston, Harrisburg and San Antonio Railway	GHSA	SP	1870	1934	Texas and New Orleans Railroad	
Galveston, Houston and Henderson Railroad	GH&H, GHH	MKT/ MP	1853	1989	Missouri Pacific Railroad	
Galveston and Houston Junction Railroad		MKT/ MP	1861	1871	Galveston, Houston and Henderson Railroad	
Galveston, Houston and Northern Railway		SP	1899	1905	Galveston, Harrisburg and San Antonio Railway	
Galveston, LaPorte and Houston Railway		SP	1895	1898	Galveston, Houston and Northern Railway	
Galveston and Red River Railway		SP	1848	1856	Houston and Texas Central Railway	
Galveston, Sabine and St. Louis Railway		ATSF	1882	1888	Texas, Sabine Valley and Northwestern Railway	
Galveston Terminal Railway		CB&Q/ RI	1905	1985	Burlington Northern Railroad	
Galveston and Western Railway		ATSF	1887	1923	Gulf, Colorado and Santa Fe Railway	
Galveston Wharf Company	GWF		1870	1940	Board of Trustees of the Galveston Wharves	
Georgetown Railroad		MP	1878	1879	International and Great Northern Railroad	
Georgetown and Granger Railroad		MKT	1890	1902	Granger, Georgetown, Austin and San Antonio Railway	
Gonzales Branch Railroad		SP	1881	1905	Galveston, Harrisburg and San Antonio Railway	
Granger, Georgetown, Austin and San Antonio Railway		MKT	1902	1903	Missouri, Kansas and Texas Railway of Texas	
Granite Mountain and Marble Falls Railroad		SP	1888	1901	Houston and Texas Central Railroad	
Great Southwest Railroad	GSW	MP/ RI	1957	1987	Missouri Pacific Railroad	
Greenville Northwestern Railway			1913	1916	N/A	
Greenville and Whitewright Northern Traction Company			1912	1913	Greenville Northwestern Railway	
Groveton, Lufkin and Northern Railway	GL&N		1908	1932	N/A	
Gulf, Beaumont and Great Northern Railway		ATSF	1898	1948	Gulf, Colorado and Santa Fe Railway	
Gulf, Beaumont and Kansas City Railway		ATSF	1893	1948	Gulf, Colorado and Santa Fe Railway	
Gulf and Brazos Valley Railway			1897	1903	N/A	
Gulf, Colorado and Santa Fe Railway		ATSF	1873	1965	Atchison, Topeka and Santa Fe Railway	
Gulf, Colorado and San Saba Railway	GCSR		1993	2013	Heart of Texas Railroad	
Gulf and Interstate Railway of Texas		ATSF	1894	1994	Atchison, Topeka and Santa Fe Railway	
Gulf and Northern Railway			1917	1943	N/A	
Gulf, Texas and Western Railway	GT&W	SLSF	1908	1940	Chicago, Rock Island and Gulf Railway	
Gulf, Western Texas and Pacific Railway		SP	1870	1905	Galveston, Harrisburg and San Antonio Railway	
GWI Switching Services	GWSW		1994	1997	CMC Railroad	
Hamlin and Northwestern Railway			1929	1956	N/A	
Hearne and Brazos Valley Railway		SP	1891	1914	Houston and Texas Central Railroad	
Henderson and Burkeville Railroad			1852	1856	Mexican Gulf and Henderson Railroad	
Henderson and Overton Branch Railroad		MP	1874	1911	International and Great Northern Railway	
Horton Gravel Railroad		SP	1928	1929	Texas and New Orleans Railroad	
Houston Railway		SP	1892	1902	Houston and Texas Central Railroad	
Houston Belt and Magnolia Park Railway		MP	1889	1893	Houston, Oaklawn and Magnolia Park Railway	
Houston Belt and Terminal Railway	HBT	ATSF/ CB&Q/ MP/ RI	1905			Still exists as a joint subsidiary of the BNSF Railway and Union Pacific Railroad
Houston and Brazos Valley Railway	H&BV	MP	1907	1956	Missouri Pacific Railroad	
Houston and Brazos Valley Terminal Company		MP	1893	1989	Missouri Pacific Railroad	Terminal company at Houston for the MKT
Houston East and West Texas Railway	HEWT	SP	1875	1934	Texas and New Orleans Railroad	
Houston, Fostoria and Northern Railroad			1909	1909	N/A	Ran from Fostoria in Montgomery County to Cold Spring in San Jacinto County
Houston and Great Northern Railroad		MP	1866	1873	International and Great Northern Railroad	
Houston Municipal Railway			1905	1924	Port Terminal Railroad Association	
Houston North Shore Railway		MP	1925	1956	Missouri Pacific Railroad	
Houston, Oaklawn and Magnolia Park Railway		MP	1899	1903	International and Great Northern Railroad	
Houston Tap Railroad		MP	1850	1858	Houston Tap and Brazoria Railway	
Houston Tap and Brazoria Railway		MP	1856	1873	Houston and Great Northern Railroad	
Houston and Texas Central Railroad	H&TC	SP	1889	1934	Texas and New Orleans Railroad	
Houston and Texas Central Railway		SP	1856	1889	Houston and Texas Central Railroad	
Huntsville Branch Railway		MP	1871	1873	Houston and Great Northern Railroad	
Imperial Valley Railway		MP	1907	1912	Sugar Land Railway	
Indianola Railroad		SP	1858	1871	Gulf, Western Texas and Pacific Railway	
International Railroad		MP	1870	1873	International and Great Northern Railroad	
International – Great Northern Railroad	IGN	MP	1922	1956	Missouri Pacific Railroad	
International and Great Northern Railroad		MP	1873	1911	International and Great Northern Railway	
International and Great Northern Railway	I&GN	MP	1911	1922	International – Great Northern Railroad	
Jasper and Eastern Railway		ATSF	1904	1948	Gulf, Colorado and Santa Fe Railway	
Jefferson and Northwestern Railroad			1934	1941	N/A	
Jefferson and Northwestern Railway			1899	1934	Jefferson and Northwestern Railroad	
Kansas City, El Paso and Mexican Railway of Texas		SP	1888	1892	El Paso Northern Railway	
Kansas City, Mexico and Orient Railway of Texas	KCM&O	ATSF	1905	1965	Atchison, Topeka and Santa Fe Railway	
Kansas and Gulf Short Line Railroad		SSW	1880	1887	St. Louis, Arkansas and Texas Railway in Texas	
Kansas, Oklahoma and Gulf Railway	KOG	MP	1948	1964	Texas and Pacific Railway	
Kansas, Oklahoma and Gulf Railway Company of Texas		MP	1921	1964	Texas and Pacific Railway	
Kildare and Linden Railway			1889	1900	N/A	
Lake Creek Railroad			1884	1896	N/A	
Lancaster Tap Railroad		SP	1890	1905	Houston and Texas Central Railroad	
LaPorte, Houston and Northern Railroad		SP	1892	1895	Galveston, LaPorte and Houston Railway	
Livingston and Southeastern Railway			1903	1913	N/A	
Llano Estacado, Mexico and Gulf Railroad			1907	1909	N/A	
Llano Estacado Railway		ATSF	1909	1910	Pecos and Northern Texas Railway	
Longhorn Railway	LHRR		1996	2000	Austin Area Terminal Railroad	
Longview and Sabine Valley Railway		ATSF	1877	1886	Galveston, Sabine and St. Louis Railway	
Louisiana Railway and Navigation Company of Texas		KCS	1923	1930	Louisiana, Arkansas and Texas Railway	
Louisiana and Arkansas Railway	L&A, LA	KCS	1939	1992	Kansas City Southern Railway	
Louisiana, Arkansas and Texas Railway		KCS	1930	1939	Louisiana and Arkansas Railway	
Louisiana Western Extension Railroad		SP	1879	1900	Texas and New Orleans Railroad	
Lufkin, Hemphill and Gulf Railway	LH&G		1912	1937	N/A	
Marshall and East Texas Railway			1908	1918	Marshall, Elysian Fields and Southeastern Railway, Texas and Pacific Railway, Winnsboro and Gilmer Railroad	
Marshall, Elysian Fields and Southeastern Railway			1922	1945	N/A	
Marshall, Jefferson and North Western Railway			1883	1883	Marshall and Northwestern Railway	
Marshall and Northwestern Railway			1883	1885	Marshall, Paris and Northwestern Railway	
Marshall and Northwestern Railway			1882	1883	Marshall, Jefferson and North Western Railway	
Marshall, Paris and Northwestern Railway			1885	1888	Paris, Marshall and Sabine Pass Railway	
Marshall, Timpson and Sabine Pass Railway		ATSF	1896	1904	Texas and Gulf Railway	
Memphis, El Paso and Pacific Railroad		MP	1853	1873	Texas and Pacific Railway	
Mexican Gulf and Henderson Railroad		SSW	1856	1860	Eastern Texas Railroad	
Midland and Northwestern Railway			1916	1920	N/A	
Mineral Wells and Eastern Railway	MWRY		1989	1992	N/A	
Missouri–Kansas–Texas Railroad	MKT	MKT	1960	1989	Missouri Pacific Railroad	
Missouri–Kansas–Texas Railroad of Texas	MKTT	MKT	1923	1960	Missouri–Kansas–Texas Railroad	
Missouri, Kansas and Texas Railway		MKT	1870	1893	Missouri, Kansas and Texas Railway of Texas, Sherman, Shreveport and Southern Railway	
Missouri, Kansas and Texas Railway of Texas	MKTT	MKT	1891	1923	Louisiana Railway and Navigation Company of Texas, Missouri–Kansas–Texas Railroad of Texas	
Missouri, Kansas and Texas Extension Railway		MKT	1880	1881	Missouri, Kansas and Texas Railway	
Missouri, Oklahoma and Gulf Railway Company of Texas		MP	1910	1921	Kansas, Oklahoma and Gulf Railway Company of Texas	
Missouri Pacific Railroad	MP	MP	1956	1997	Union Pacific Railroad	
Missouri Pacific Railway		MP	1880	1888	N/A	
Motley County Railway	MCY	SLSF	1913	1926	Quanah, Acme and Pacific Railway	
Nacogdoches and Southeastern Railroad			1905	1954	N/A	
New York, Texas and Mexican Railway		SP	1880	1905	Galveston, Harrisburg and San Antonio Railway	
North Central Texas Railway	NCTR		1982	1982	Oklahoma, Kansas and Texas Railroad	
North Galveston, Houston and Kansas City Railroad		SP	1892	1895	Galveston, LaPorte and Houston Railway	
North Plains and Santa Fe Railway		ATSF	1930	1948	Panhandle and Santa Fe Railway	
North Texas and Santa Fe Railway		ATSF	1916	1948	Panhandle and Santa Fe Railway	
Northeast Texas Railway			1902	?	N/A	Ran from Redwater to Munz in Cass County
Northside Belt Railway			1925	1964	Port Terminal Railroad Association	
Nueces Valley, Rio Grande and Mexico Railway		MP	1905	1909	Asherton and Gulf Railway	
Oklahoma City and Texas Railroad		SLSF	1903	1907	St. Louis, San Francisco and Texas Railway	
Oklahoma, Kansas and Texas Railroad	OKKT	MKT	1980	1989	Missouri–Kansas–Texas Railroad	
Oklahoma, Red River and Texas Railway			1910	1912	N/A	Operated Blossom to Deport, 11 miles
Orange and Northwestern Railroad		MP	1901	1956	Missouri Pacific Railroad	
Panhandle Railway		ATSF	1887	1898	Southern Kansas Railway of Texas	
Panhandle and Gulf Railway		ATSF	1899	1905	Kansas City, Mexico and Orient Railway of Texas	
Panhandle and Santa Fe Railway		ATSF	1914	1965	Atchison, Topeka and Santa Fe Railway	
Paris, Choctaw and Little Rock Railway			1888		N/A	
Paris and Great Northern Railroad		SLSF	1888	1928	St. Louis, San Francisco and Texas Railway	
Paris, Marshall and Sabine Pass Railway			1888	1892	Texas Southern Railway	
Paris and Mount Pleasant Railroad	P&MP, PMP		1909	1956	N/A	
PB Railroad			1974	1975	Western Rail Road	
Peach River and Gulf Railway			1904	1908	N/A	
Pecos and Northern Texas Railway		ATSF	1898	1948	Panhandle and Santa Fe Railway	
Pecos River Railroad		ATSF	1890	1948	Panhandle and Santa Fe Railway	
Port Arthur Canal and Dock Company		KCS	1902			
Port Arthur Channel and Dock Company		KCS	1897	1902	Port Arthur Canal and Dock Company	
Port Bolivar Iron Ore Railway		ATSF	1910	1927	N/A	
Port Isabel and Rio Grande Valley Railway		MP	1928	1940	St. Louis, Brownsville and Mexico Railroad, San Benito and Rio Grande Valley Railroad	
Quanah, Acme and Pacific Railway	QA&P, QAP	SLSF	1909	1981	Burlington Northern Railroad	
Red River and Southwestern Railway			1890		Southwestern Railway	
Red River, Texas and Southern Railway		SLSF	1901	1904	St. Louis, San Francisco and Texas Railway	
Rio Grande Railroad		MP	1870	1911	Rio Grande Railway	
Rio Grande Railway		MP	1911	1926	Port Isabel and Rio Grande Valley Railway	
Rio Grande City Railway		MP	1924	1956	Missouri Pacific Railroad	
Rio Grande and Eagle Pass Railway			1885	1947	N/A	
Rio Grande and El Paso Railroad		ATSF	1880	1914	Rio Grande, El Paso and Santa Fe Railroad	
Rio Grande, El Paso and Santa Fe Railroad		ATSF	1914	1994	Atchison, Topeka and Santa Fe Railway	
Rio Grande, Micolithic and Northern Railway			1926	1929	N/A	
Rio Grande Northern Railroad			1893	1897	N/A	
Rio Grande and Pecos Railway			1882	1884	Rio Grande and Eagle Pass Railway	
Rio Valley Railroad	RVRR		1993			Still exists as a lessor of the Rio Valley Switching Company
Riverside and Gulf Railway			1907	1913	Union Lumber Company	
Riviera Beach and Western Railway			1912	1917	N/A	
Roby and Northern Railroad			1915	1941	N/A	
Rockdale, Sandow and Southern Railroad	RSS		1923	2019	N/A	
Roscoe, Snyder and Pacific Railway	RS&P, RSP		1906	1984	N/A	
Rusk, Palestine and Pacific Railway			2012	2018	Texas & Eastern Railroad	
Rusk Transportation Company		SSW	1874	1879	Kansas and Gulf Short Line Railroad	
Sabine and East Texas Railway		SP	1881	1882	Texas and New Orleans Railroad	
Sabine and Northern Railroad			1899	1943	Lumber tap line, Ruliff to Deweyville	
Sabine Pass and East Texas Railway			1858	1861	Removed tracks in 1860s.	
Sabine and Galveston Bay Railroad and Lumber Company		SP	1856	1859	Texas and New Orleans Railroad	
Sabine and Neches Valley Railway			1921	1944	N/A	
Sabine Pass, Alexandria and Northwestern Railway			1892	1901	N/A	
St. Louis, Arkansas and Texas Railway		SSW	1886	1891	St. Louis Southwestern Railway of Texas, Tyler Southeastern Railway	
St. Louis, Brownsville and Mexico Railway	SB&M, SBM	MP	1903	1956	Missouri Pacific Railroad	
St. Louis – San Francisco Railway	SLSF	SLSF	1964	1980	Burlington Northern Inc.	
St. Louis, San Francisco and Texas Railway		SLSF	1900	1964	St. Louis – San Francisco Railway	
St. Louis Southwestern Railway	SSW	SSW	1954	1997	Union Pacific Railroad	
St. Louis Southwestern Railway of Texas	SSW	SSW	1891	1984	St. Louis Southwestern Railway	
San Antonio and Aransas Pass Railway	SAAP	SP	1884	1934	Texas and New Orleans Railroad	
San Antonio Belt and Terminal Railway		MKT	1912	1989	Missouri–Kansas–Texas Railroad	
San Antonio, Fredericksburg and Northern Railway			1913	1917	Fredericksburg and Northern Railway	
San Antonio and Gulf Railroad		SP	1897	1905	Galveston, Harrisburg and San Antonio Railway	
San Antonio and Gulf Shore Railway		SP	1893	1896	San Antonio and Gulf Railroad	
San Antonio and Mexican Gulf Railroad		SP	1850	1871	Gulf, Western Texas and Pacific Railway	
San Antonio and Rio Grande Valley Railway	MP		?	1912	St. Louis, Brownsville and Mexico Railway	Private partnership, no date of incorporation
San Antonio Southern Railway		MP	1920	1956	Missouri Pacific Railroad	
San Antonio, Uvalde and Gulf Railroad		MP	1912	1956	Missouri Pacific Railroad	
San Benito and Rio Grande Valley Railway	SB&R	MP	1912	1956	Missouri Pacific Railroad	
San Benito and Rio Grande Valley Interurban Railway		MP	1912	1912	San Benito and Rio Grande Valley Railway	
San Diego and Gulf Railway		NDM	1929	1935	N/A	
Sanford and Northern Railway			1931		N/A	
Seagraves, Whiteface and Lubbock Railroad	SWGR		1990	1995	West Texas and Lubbock Railroad	
Sherman, Denison and Dallas Railway		MKT	1890	1891	Missouri, Kansas and Texas Railway	
Sherman, Shreveport and Southern Railway		MKT	1893	1901	Missouri, Kansas and Texas Railway of Texas	
Shreveport, Houston and Gulf Railroad			1906	1936	N/A	
South Galveston and Gulf Shore Railroad			1891	1895	N/A	
South Orient Railroad	SO		1992	2001	Texas Pacifico Transportation	
South Plains and Santa Fe Railway		ATSF	1916	1948	Panhandle and Santa Fe Railway	
Southern Kansas Railway of Texas		ATSF	1886	1914	Panhandle and Santa Fe Railway	
Southern Pacific Company	SP	SP	1934	1969	Southern Pacific Transportation Company	
Southern Pacific Company		SP	1885	1889	N/A	
Southern Pacific Railroad		MP	1856	1872	Texas and Pacific Railway	
Southern Pacific Terminal Company		SP	1901	1962	Southern Pacific Company	
Southern Pacific Transportation Company	SP	SP	1969	1998	Union Pacific Railroad	
Southern Trans-Continental Railway		MP	1870	1872	Texas Pacific Railroad	
Southwestern Railroad	SW		1990	2007	N/A	
Southwestern Railway			1907	1920	N/A	
Stamford and Northwestern Railway		CB&Q	1909	1952	Fort Worth and Denver Railway	
Stephenville North and South Texas Railway		SSW	1907	1941	N/A	
Sugar Land Railway	SL	MP	1893	1956	Missouri Pacific Railroad	
Taylor, Bastrop and Houston Railway		MKT	1886	1886	Missouri, Kansas and Texas Railway	
Texarkana and Fort Smith Railway		KCS	1889	1943	Kansas City Southern Railway	
Texarkana and Northern Railway		KCS	1885	1889	Texarkana and Fort Smith Railway	
Texarkana Union Station Trust	TUST	KCS/ MP/ SSW	1927			
Texas, Arkansas and Louisiana Railway			1897	1920	N/A	
Texas Central Railroad	TEXC	MKT	1892			Still exists as a lessor of the Fort Worth and Western Railroad
Texas Central Railway		MKT, SP	1879	1891	Texas Central Railroad, Texas Midland Railroad	Not to be confused with the Texas Central Railway high speed rail project.
Texas City Terminal Company			1898	1921	Texas City Terminal Railway	
Texas City Terminal Railway			1893	1897	Texas City Terminal Company	
Texas City Transportation Company			1904	1920	Texas City Terminal Railway	
Texas Export Railroad	TXRC		1972	1976	N/A	
Texas and Gulf Railway		ATSF	1904	1948	Gulf, Colorado and Santa Fe Railway	
Texas and Louisiana Railroad		SSW	1900	1903	St. Louis Southwestern Railway of Texas	
Texas, Louisiana and Eastern Railroad		ATSF	1891	1897	Gulf, Colorado and Santa Fe Railway	
Texas Mexican Railway	TM	NDM	1881			Still exists as a nonoperating subsidiary of the Kansas City Southern Railway
Texas Mexican Northern Railway		NDM	1882	1906	Texas Mexican Railway	
Texas Midland Railroad		SP	1892	1934	Texas and New Orleans Railroad	
Texas – New Mexico Railway	TNM	MP	1927	1978	Missouri Pacific Railroad	
Texas and New Orleans Railroad	T&NO, TNO	SP	1859	1961	Southern Pacific Company	
Texas and Northeastern Railway			1900	1901	N/A	
Texas Northern Railway			1908	1908	Groveton, Lufkin and Northern Railway	Name changed to Groveton, Lufkin and Northern Railway prior to commencing operations
Texas Pacific Railroad		MP	1871	1872	Texas and Pacific Railway	
Texas and Pacific Railway	T&P, TP	MP	1872	1976	Missouri Pacific Railroad	
Texas and Sabine Valley Railway		ATSF	1892	1904	Texas and Gulf Railway	
Texas, Sabine Valley and Northwestern Railway		ATSF	1887	1904	Texas and Gulf Railway	
Texas and St. Louis Railway		SSW	1879	1886	St. Louis, Arkansas and Texas Railway	
Texas Short Line Railway		MP	1901	1962	N/A	
Texas Southern Railway			1897	1908	Marshall and East Texas Railway	
Texas State Railroad		SP	1907	1969	N/A	Continued as a tourist railroad
Texas Transportation Company	TXTC		1897	2000	N/A	
Texas Transportation Company		SP	1866	1896	Texas and New Orleans Railroad	
Texas Trunk Railroad		SP	1879	1895	Texas and New Orleans Railroad	
Texas Western Railroad		MP	1852	1856	Southern Pacific Railroad	
Texas Western Railway			1879	1896	N/A	Ceased operations in 1896, but not abandoned until 1899
Texas Western Narrow Gauge Railway			1875	1879	Texas Western Railway	First narrow-gauge railroad chartered in Texas
Timpson and Henderson Railway			1909	1923	N/A	
Timpson and Northwestern Railway			1901	1909	Timpson and Henderson Railway	
Trinity and Brazos Valley Railway		CB&Q/ RI	1902	1930	Burlington – Rock Island Railroad	
Trinity, Cameron and Western Railroad		MKT	1892	1902	Granger, Georgetown, Austin and San Antonio Railway	
Trinity and Sabine Railway		MKT	1881	1882	Missouri, Kansas and Texas Railway	Sold in 1923 to Waco, Beaumont, Trinity and Sabine Railway
Trinity Valley Railroad			1899	1901	Trinity Valley Southern Railroad	
Trinity Valley and Northern Railway			1906	1932	N/A	
Trinity Valley Southern Railroad			1901	1936	N/A	
Tyler Southeastern Railway		SSW	1891	1899	St. Louis Southwestern Railway of Texas	
Tyler Tap Railroad		SSW	1871	1879	Texas and St. Louis Railway	
Union Passenger Depot Company of Galveston		ATSF	1897	1957	Gulf, Colorado and Santa Fe Railway	
Union Terminal Company		ATSF/ CB&Q/ MKT/ MP/ RI/ SLSF/ SSW/ SP	1912	1974	Atchison, Topeka and Santa Fe Railway, Chicago, Rock Island and Pacific Railroad, Fort Worth and Denver Railway, Missouri–Kansas–Texas Railroad, St. Louis – San Francisco Railway, St. Louis Southwestern Railway, Southern Pacific Transportation Company, Texas and Pacific Railway (one-eighth interest each in trackage)	
Uvalde and Northern Railway			1914	1941	N/A	
Velasco, Brazos and Northern Railway		MP	1901	1906	Houston and Brazos Valley Railway	
Velasco, Suburban and Belt Line Railway			1910	1912	N/A	Ran from Velasco to Surfside
Velasco Terminal Railway		MP	1891	1901	Velasco, Brazos and Northern Railway	
Victoria and Columbia Railroad		MP	1866	1873	Houston and Great Northern Railroad	
Waco, Beaumont, Trinity and Sabine Railway			1923	1959	N/A	
Waco and Northwestern Railroad		SP	1870	1873	Houston and Texas Central Railway	
Waco Tap Railroad		SP	1866	1870	Waco and Northwestern Railroad	
Warren Central Railroad		SP	1930	1934	Texas and New Orleans Railroad	
Warren and Corsicana Pacific Railway			1899	1908	N/A	
Washington County Railroad		SP	1856	1868	Houston and Texas Central Railway	
Waxahachie Tap Railroad		SP	1875	1881	Central Texas and Northwestern Railway	
Weatherford, Mineral Wells and Northwestern Railway	WM&N, WMWN	MP	1889	1988	Missouri Pacific Railroad	
West Texas and Lubbock Railroad	WTLR		1995			Still exists as a lessor of the West Texas and Lubbock Railway
Western Narrow Gauge Railway			1870	1875	Texas Western Narrow Gauge Railway	
Wichita Falls Railway		MKT	1894	1969	Missouri–Kansas–Texas Railroad	
Wichita Falls and Northwestern Railway of Texas		MKT	1906	1923	Missouri–Kansas–Texas Railroad	
Wichita Falls and Oklahoma Railway		CB&Q	1903	1942	N/A	
Wichita Falls, Ranger and Fort Worth Railroad		MKT	1919	1940	Wichita Falls and Southern Railroad	
Wichita Falls and Southern Railroad		MKT	1920	1955	Chicago, Rock Island and Pacific Railroad	
Wichita Falls and Southern Railway		MKT	1907	1940	Wichita Falls and Southern Railroad	
Wichita Falls and Wellington Railway of Texas		MKT	1910	1958	N/A	
Wichita Valley Railroad		CB&Q	1905	1952	Fort Worth and Denver Railway	
Wichita Valley Railway	WV	CB&Q	1890	1952	Fort Worth and Denver Railway	

=== Electric ===
- Austin Dam and Suburban Railway
- Belton–Temple Traction Company
- Bryan and Central Texas Interurban Railway
- Bryan and College Interurban Railway
- Bryan–College Traction Company
- Dallas Southern Traction Company
- Denison and Sherman Railway
- Eastern Texas Electric Company
- Fort Worth Southern Traction Company
- Galveston–Houston Electric Railway
- Houston North Shore Railway
- Jefferson County Traction Company
- Northern Texas Traction Company
- Rio Grande Valley Traction Company
- Roby and Northern Railroad
- Southern Traction Company
- Southwestern Traction Company
- Tarrant County Traction Company
- Texas Electric Railway (TER)
- Texas Interurban Railway
- Texas Traction Company

== Railroads not completed ==
Name	Begun	Proposal	Construction
Arkansas, Red River and Paris Railroad	1908	De Queen, Arkansas to Paris	Grading
Beaumont and Great Northern Railroad, original scheme	1905	Trunk line, Beaumont to Waco	Opened Livingston to Weldon, abandoned rest
Brazos and Galveston Railroad	1839	San Luis Island to Velasco	Bridge to mainland
Bridgeport and Decatur Railroad	1891	Decatur to Bridgeport	Grading
Columbus, San Antonio and Rio Grande Railroad	1858	Columbus through Gonzales and San Antonio to the Rio Grande	Grading
Corpus Christi Street and Interurban Railway	1916	Electric interurban, Corpus Christi to Ward Island	Grading; the company only operated streetcars
Dallas, Pacific and Southeastern Railway, original scheme	1889	Dallas to Albuquerque, New Mexico	Graded from Dallas to near Paradise, grade never used by the Gulf, Texas and Western Railway
Dallas Southwestern Traction	1917	Dallas to Glen Rose via Irving and Cleburne	Grading, and some infrastructure
Denison, Bonham and New Orleans Railroad, Wolfe City Extension	1901	Bonham to Wolfe City	Grading
East Texas Traction	1912	Dallas and Greenville	Grading
Eastland, Wichita Falls and Gulf Railway, original scheme	1918	May to Newcastle via Mangum	Opened Mangum to Breckwalker, abandoned rest
Enid, Ochiltree and Western Railroad	1909	Dalhart to Ochiltree via Dumas	Graded between Dalhart and Dumas with 14 miles of track
Estacado and Gulf Railroad, Norman to Roby	1910	McCaulley to Roby, 10 miles	Completed 6 miles to Norman, scavenged for the Roby and Northern Railroad
Fort Worth and Albuquerque Railroad	1889	Fort Worth to Jacksboro	Grading
Fort Worth and Rio Grande Railway, original scheme	1885	Fort Worth to Eagle Pass, branch to San Antonio.	Opened to Menard, abandoned rest.
Gainesville, Whiteboro and Sherman Railway	1906	Gainesville to Sherman, electric interurban	Graded 12 miles east of Gainesville
Galveston, Brazos and Colorado Narrow Gauge Railway, original scheme	1875	Galveston to a bridge over the San Luis Pass, then to Austin.	Opened 15 miles Galveston to Seaforth, abandoned rest
Galveston, Brazos and Southwestern Railway	1898	Galveston to San Antonio	Grading, bridge across the Chocolate Bayou
Glen Rose and Walnut Springs Railroad	1914	Glen Rose to Walnut Springs	Electric, grading completed 1916
Greenville Northwestern Railway, original scheme	1913	Electric line, Anna to Greenville via Blue Ridge	Opened Anna to Blue Ridge, abandoned rest, did not electrify
Gulf and Brazos Valley Railway, original scheme	1897	Peck City via Mineral Wells to Stoneburg	Opened Peck City to Mineral Wells, abandoned rest
Gulf, Colorado and Santa Fe Railway, original scheme	1875	Galveston to Santa Fe, New Mexico, via Coleman, Texas	Opened Galveston to a point south of Coleman, purchased by ATSF, northwestern terminus changed to Sweetwater
Gulf and Pacific Railway 1)	1904	Paris to Velasco	Some track laid 1904
Gulf and Pacific Railway 2)	1914	Sweetwater to Comanche	Grading
Gulf, Texas and Western Railway, original scheme	1910	Lubbock to Dallas via Benjamin, Seymour, Jacksboro and Boonville with a branch to Fort Worth.	Graded Benjamin to Seymour, opened Seymour via Jacksboro, then to Salesville on revised route
Gulf and West Texas Railway	1927	San Antonio to San Angelo	Grading
Harrisburg Railroad and Trading Company	1841	Harrisburg to the Brazos River	Graded 2 miles
Houston, Trinity and Tyler Railroad	1860	Houston to Jefferson via Tyler and Gilmer	Grading
Kansas City, Oklahoma and Houston Railroad	1907	Trunk line from Kansas City to Houston	Graded Honey Grove to the Red River, some track laid
Kansas City, Mexico and Orient Railway - Del Rio Branch	1909	San Angelo to Del Rio, a trunk line to Mexico City	Opened eventually to Sonora, rest abandoned
Mineola and Pittsburg Railroad	1895	Mineola to Pittsburg	Grading
Oklahoma, Red River and Texas Railway, original scheme	1910	Blossom to Mineola	Opened Blossom to Deport and abandoned rest
Pan American Railway	1891	Victoria to Rio de Janeiro in Brazil via Brownsville	Tracks laid 10 miles to the Guadalupe River
Panhandle and Gulf Railway, original scheme	1899	Sweetwater to Laredo via San Angelo	Tracks laid 15 miles Sweetwater to Sylvester, and 7 miles south-east of former, not used by successor KCM&O
Paris, Marshall and Sabine Pass Railway, original scheme	1888	Trunk line, Paris to Sabine Pass	Opened Winnsboro to Elysian Fields via Marshall, abandoned rest
Port Arthur and Houston Short Line	1905	Direct route Houston to Port Arthur	Grading
Port O'Connor, Rio Grande and Northern Railroad	1906	Port O'Connor to San Antonio	Tracks laid Port O’Connor to Yoakum, graded to Gonzalez
Quanah, Acme and Pacific Railway, Floydada to El Paso	1909	Intended transcontinental trunk line for St. Louis–San Francisco Railway	Preparatory works, in advertising to 1928
Rio Grande and Eagle Pass Railway, original scheme	1885	Laredo to Eagle Pass	Opened Laredo to Santo Tomás, abandoned rest
Rio Grande Northern Railroad, original scheme	1893	Van Horn via Chispa and San Carlos to the Rio Grande at Sanchez Ranch.	Completed Chispa to San Carlos, abandoned rest, never ran its own trains
Rock Island, Texico-Farwell and Southern Railroad	1912	Tucumcari, New Mexico to San Antonio via Farwell	Graded 38 miles south of Farwell, 3 miles of track laid
San Antonio and Austin Interurban Railway	1913	Electric, San Antonio to Austin	Grading
San Antonio, Rockport and Mexican Railway	1912	San Antonio to new docks at Rockport and to Brownsville, junction at Crowther near Tilden	Graded to Matlock on south boundary of McMullen County
San Marcos Valley Interurban Railway	1905	Electric, San Marcos to Luling	Grading
South Galveston and Gulf Shore Railroad, End of Tracks to South Galveston	1891	Galveston 13.5 miles to new city of South Galveston (now Galveston Island State Park).	Only 4.5 miles completed.
Temple–Northwestern Railway	1910	Temple through Gatesville and Hamilton to Comanche	40 miles of grading and 5 miles of track
Texas, New Mexico and Pacific Railway	1905	McKinney via Denton, Decatur, Bridgeport to Roswell, New Mexico	Grading, bought old grade of Bridgeport and Decatur Railroad
Texas Western Narrow Gauge Railway, original scheme	1872	Houston to Presidio	Opened Houston to Sealy, abandoned rest.
Union Central Railway	1908	Trunk line from Houston to Paris and the Red River, with branches to Waco and Palestine	Construction began at Palestine
Van Horn Valley Land and Railway Company	1914	Van Horn to Pine Springs	Grading
Winnsboro and Gilmer Railroad	1917	Bought section of defunct Marshall and East Texas Railway	Did not operate

== See also ==
- Article X of the Texas Constitution
