= SWGR =

SWGR may refer to:

- Single wire ground return
- Seagraves, Whiteface and Lubbock Railroad
- Switchgear
