= Port Terminal Railroad Association =

Overview
- Headquarters: Houston, Texas
- Reporting mark: PTRA
- Locale: Port of Houston
- Dates of operation: 1924–

Technical
- Track gauge: 4 ft 8 1/2 in (1,435 mm) standard gauge

Other
- Website: https://www.ptra.com/

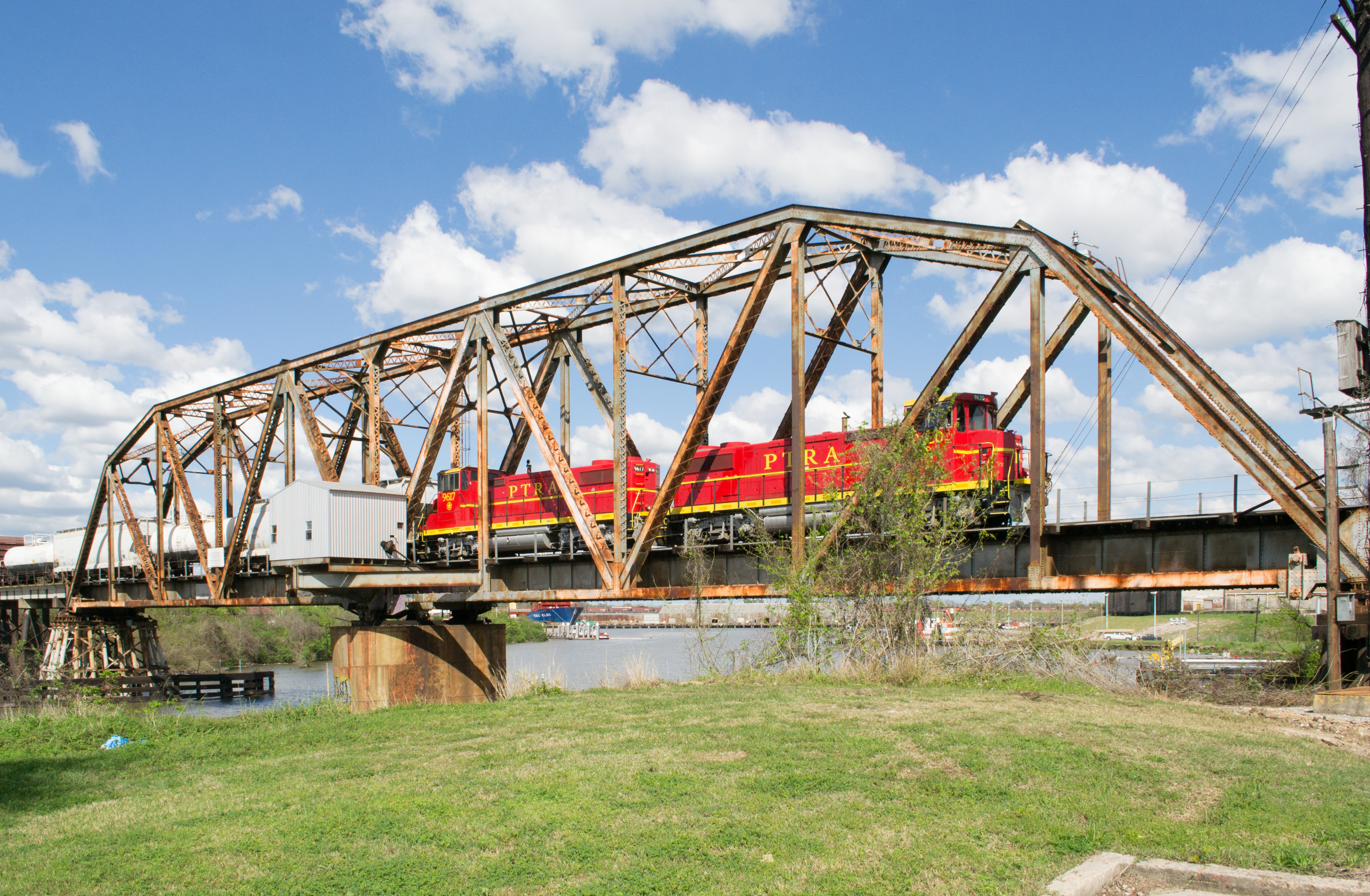
A PTRA train in 2016, crossing one of two surviving swing bridges over Buffalo Bayou in Houston

The Port Terminal Railroad Association is an American terminal railroad that operates 185 miles (298 km) of track at the Port of Houston in Houston, Texas. It is an independent association comprising Port of Houston Authority, the Houston Belt & Terminal Railway, Union Pacific Railroad, BNSF Railway and Kansas City Southern Railway.
