= Akron, Texas =

Ghost town in Texas, US

Akron, also known as Lavender and Holly, is a ghost town in Smith County, Texas, United States. It was settled in 1877, as a stop on the Texas and St. Louis Railway. At its peak, it had two houses and the Pleasant Grove School. It was abandoned by the 1960s.
