= Schwertner, Texas =

Unincorporated community in Texas, US

Coordinates: 30°48′56″N 97°30′51″W

Schwertner is an unincorporated community in Williamson County, Texas, United States. It is approximately 28 miles north-northeast of Round Rock. Schwertner has a post office, with the ZIP code 76573.

Starting in 1909, Schwertner was along the tracks of the Bartlett-Florence Railway, later the Bartlett Western Railroad, which ran from a connection at Bartlett, Texas with the Missouri–Kansas–Texas Railroad to Florence, Texas, a significant cotton-processing center. The railroad gave Apostolic names to its stops, and the station for Schwertner was known as St. Matthew. However, that line was abandoned in 1935.
