= St. Louis Southwestern Railway of Texas =

American railroad

- Cotton Belt system as of 1918

Overview
- Headquarters: Tyler, Texas
- Reporting mark: SSW
- Locale: Texas
- Dates of operation: 1891–1954
- Successor: Southern Pacific

Technical
- Track gauge: 4 ft 8 1/2 in (1,435 mm) standard gauge

The St. Louis Southwestern Railway of Texas (reporting mark SSW), operated the lines of its parent company, the St. Louis Southwestern Railway within the state of Texas. The St. Louis Southwestern, known by its nickname of "The Cotton Belt Route" or simply the Cotton Belt, was organized on January 12, 1891, although it had its origins in a rail line founded in 1871 in Tyler, Texas that eventually connected northeastern Texas to Arkansas and southeastern Missouri. Construction of the original Tyler Tap Railroad began in the summer of 1875, and the first 21 miles out of Tyler to Big Sandy, Texas were constructed by early October of 1887. The line became the Texas and St. Louis Railway, and was completed between Gatesville, Texas and Bird's Point, Missouri by August 12, 1883, creating a continuous 725-mile system. However, that line promptly went into receivership, and was purchased by the St. Louis, Arkansas and Texas Railway in 1886. The assets of that company were acquired out of foreclosure by the St. Louis-Southwestern Railway in 1891. The St. Louis Southwestern of Texas merged with the property of the Tyler Southeastern Railway on October 6, 1899. The property of the Texas and Louisiana Railway was acquired and merged on July 2, 1903.

In 1948 the St. Louis Southwestern of Texas operated a total of 856.82 miles of track. The Interstate Commerce Commission authorized St. Louis Southwestern Railway to lease the Texas company in December 1953. The lease was entered into on March 1, 1954 to maintain, operate and use properties of the company until July 1, 1990. The track miles of the St. Louis Southwestern Railway of Texas operated under lease by the St. Louis Southwestern Railway in 1967 were 753.74 miles. This was further broken down to Main line 558.87 miles and 194.87 miles of yard track and sidings.

The Southern Pacific Company gained Interstate Commerce Commission approval to control the Cotton Belt system on April 14, 1932 but continued to operate it as a separate company until 1992, when the SP consolidated the Cotton Belt's operations into the parent company.

During its years of operation, the revenues from operations in Texas generated more than $1 million per year, qualifying the line as a Class I railroad by the Interstate Commerce Commission. The St. Louis Southwestern Railway of Texas was leased to its corporate parent on March 1, 1954.

== See also ==
- St. Louis Southwestern Railway
