= Ambrose, Texas =

Unincorporated community in Texas, US

- Unincorporated area
- Location in Texas
- Coordinates: 33°41′26″N 96°23′07″W
- Country: United States
- State: Texas
- County: Grayson
- Elevation: 535 ft (163 m)

Population (2014)
  - Total: 90
- GNIS feature ID: 1351073

Ambrose is an unincorporated community in Grayson County, Texas, United States.

== History ==
Ambrose is situated on the intersection of Farm to Market Road 1897 and U.S. Highway 69. It was named after settler Ambrose Bible, who bought land from a February 20, 1845 land survey by Daniel Montague. The land was in Fannin County at the time it was bought. The Denison, Bonham and New Orleans Railroad built a stop in Ambrose. A post office was opened in September 1902, with James B. Moore as postmaster. The railroad stop was closed by 1927, and the post office was moved to nearby Bells in 1930. As of 2014, the community has a population of 90.
