= Texas City Terminal Railway =

32-mile-long railroad

Overview
- Headquarters: Texas City, Texas
- Reporting mark: TCT
- Locale: Texas City, Texas
- Dates of operation: 1921–

Technical
- Track gauge: 4 ft 8 1/2 in (1,435 mm) standard gauge

The Texas City Terminal Railway is an American terminal railroad that operates 32 miles (51 km) of track at the Port of Texas City in Texas City, Texas. Established in 1921, the TCTR is jointly owned by the Union Pacific Railroad and BNSF Railway.
