= Austin Area Terminal Railroad =

Terminal railroad in Round Rock, Texas, USA

Overview
- Headquarters: Round Rock
- Reporting mark: AUAR
- Locale: Texas
- Dates of operation: 2000–2007

Technical
- Track gauge: 4 ft 8 1/2 in (1,435 mm) standard gauge

The Austin Area Terminal Railroad (reporting mark AUAR) was a short-line terminal railroad headquartered in Round Rock, Texas.

== Overview ==
AUAR operated a 154.8 miles (249.1 km) line from Llano, Texas, to an interchange with Union Pacific at Giddings, Texas, with a 6.4 miles (10.3 km) branch from Fairland to Marble Falls. The line, which was originally a Southern Pacific branch that had been operated by Longhorn Railway until AUAR assumed control, is owned by Capital Metropolitan Transportation Authority, with whom AUAR had a contract to operate the railroad from April 2000 to September 2007. AUAR traffic included aggregates, crushed limestone, calcium bicarbonate, lumber, beer, chemicals, plastics, and paper.

The contract was transferred to Watco as of October 1, 2007 and the name of the railroad was subsequently changed to the Austin Western Railroad.

In addition, the Austin Steam Train Association operated an excursion train between Austin, Cedar Park, and Burnet.
