= Bartlett Western Railroad =

Overview
- Headquarters: Bartlett, Texas
- Locale: Texas
- Dates of operation: 1909–1935

Technical
- Track gauge: 4 ft 8 1/2 in (1,435 mm)
- Length: 23 mi (37 km)

The Bartlett Western Railroad, sometimes called the Bartlett Western Railway, was a shortline rail carrier running between Bartlett, Texas and Florence, Texas, about 22-23 miles. A predecessor company started in 1909, and the railroad ended in 1935.

== History ==
Founded in 1909, the aptly-named Bartlett Florence Railway was created to run from a rail connection with the Missouri–Kansas–Texas Railroad at Bartlett to the town of Florence, which was a significant cotton processing center having multiple cotton gins. However, the company only got as far as Jarrell, Texas, being 11 or 12 miles. Nevertheless, the railroad was important enough that it killed the town of Corn Hill, Texas. When the line bypassed Corn Hill by a mile, and Jarrell was established alongside the rails, all of the people and most of the buildings of Corn Hill were relocated to Jarrell.

The line was purchased May 29, 1911 at a foreclosure sale by a group of Texas businessmen, and on June 17, 1911 they incorporated the Bartlett Western Railroad. They completed the line to Florence, making the entire line 22 or 23 miles in length, on December 27, 1911.

Initially, business was good. In 1912 the railway carried 53,750 tons of cotton—its primary commodity—and in 1916 with one locomotive (a Baldwin 2-6-0 Mogul steam engine), eighteen freight cars, two passenger cars, and eight company cars, made $30,327 in freight revenue plus about one-eighth of that in passenger revenue.

In 1916 the line was purchased by Colonel Thomas Cronin, known as a pioneer in railroading circles for his work on the International and Great Northern Railroad. He moved to Bartlett and employed his family members in the company, including making his colorful daughter Marie a Vice President.

Under the Colonel, the railroad adopted a religious theme. Cotton pickup stations between Bartlett and Florence were named St. Matthew (Schwertner), St. Mark (Jarrell), St. Luke (Atkinson community), and St. John (Armstrong community). Copies of the Gospels were posted on the station walls as reading material. Accordingly, the line acquired nicknames such as the Road of the Apostles and the Four Gospels Railroad.

Over time the line accumulated some more negative nicknames. Some called it the Bullfrog Line, because the trains jumped the track so often. Because the line would sometimes request the passengers to not only get off the train to help the overburdened locomotive get up the grade between Bartlett and Florence, but also to help push it over the hump, some said its initials BW stood for Better Walk.

The railroad started encountering severe problems. It was not able to obtain financing to extend the line to connect with the Santa Fe Railway at Lampasas, Texas. Floods washed out bridges and trestles in the 1920-1922 timeframe. In 1926, cotton prices plummeted, hurting cotton haulage revenue. And in 1927 the Colonel died. However, the railroad was taken over by daughter Marie, who persevered for several more years.

However, the route was finally abandoned on October 11, 1935. Marie sold the rails, and with the proceeds managed to live at a reasonably comfortable level until her death in 1951.
