= Blacklands Railroad =

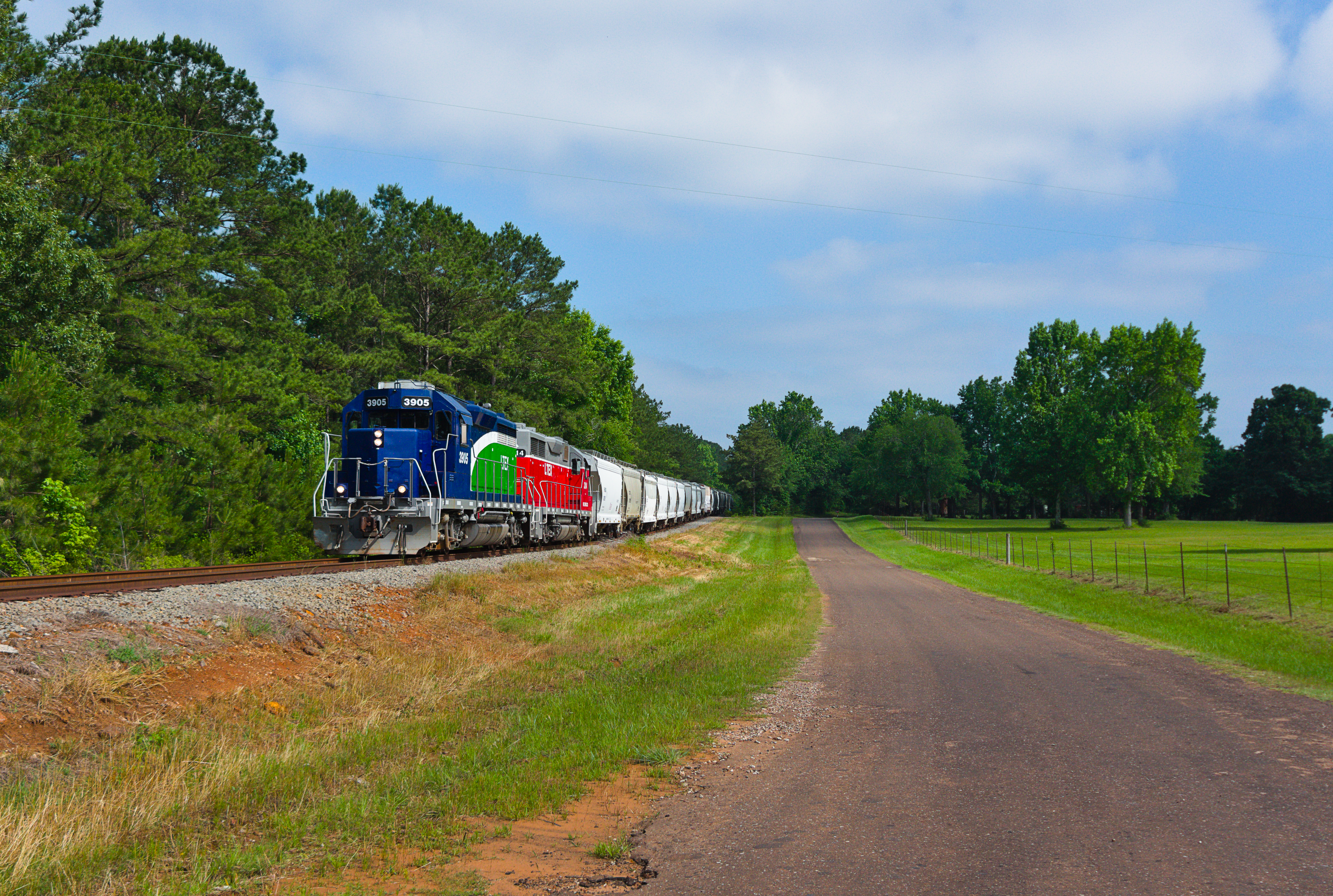

Overview
- Headquarters: Sulphur Springs, Texas
- Reporting mark: BLR
- Locale: Sulphur Springs, Texas, U.S.
- Dates of operation: 1999–present
- Predecessor: Southern Pacific

Technical
- Track gauge: 4 ft 8 1/2 in (1,435 mm) standard gauge
- Length: 8 mi (12.9 km)

Other
- Website: www.blacklandsrailroad.com

The Blacklands Railroad (reporting mark BLR) is a class III short-line railroad headquartered in Sulphur Springs, Texas, United States.

== History ==
The Blacklands Railroad began operations in 1999 on an abandoned Southern Pacific rail line that stretched from Mt. Pleasant, Texas to Greenville, Texas. In 2010, Blacklands Railroad expanded to operate another shortline, The Henderson-Overton Branch (HOB), that stretched from Overton, Texas to Henderson, Texas. Blacklands Railroad further diversified in 2014 by creating a subsidiary, Black Gold Terminals, that specializes in transloading, contract switching, and industrial rail parks. Blacklands Railroad was awarded the Short Line Railroad of the Year in 2011 by Railway Age.

== Blacklands Railroad (BLR) ==
The St. Louis, Arkansas, & Texas Railroad was built through Sulphur Springs, Texas, in 1887 on its way to Commerce and Sherman. The next year the line was completed to Fort Worth. In 1891, the bankrupt railroad was sold to Jay Gould Interests and renamed the St. Louis Southwestern Railway, also known as the Cotton Belt. This line became the basis of Blacklands Railroad, but not before portions of it were owned by Southern Pacific and Union Pacific.

The Northeast Texas Rural Rail Transportation District (NETEX) purchased the segment between Greenville, Texas and Sulphur Springs in 1995 (from the Southern Pacific), and the remainder of the line in 2000 (from Union Pacific). In 1999, Blacklands Railroad was awarded the contract to operate the 65.6 mile line from 1999 until 2020, from Greenville where it interchanged with Kansas City Southern to Sulphur Springs (another KCS interchange) and finally Mount Vernon, Texas near the Franklin/Titus county line; from this point Blacklands Railroad operates via Union Pacific trackage rights to Mount Pleasant, Texas where it interchanges with Union Pacific. Presently the Blacklands Railroad operates only on the UP trackage rights and interchanges with UP in Mt. Pleasant.

Over the years, Blacklands Railroad traffic has included a host of commodities including forest products, scrap materials, plastic, grain, chemicals, and steel.

== Henderson-Overton Branch (HOB) ==
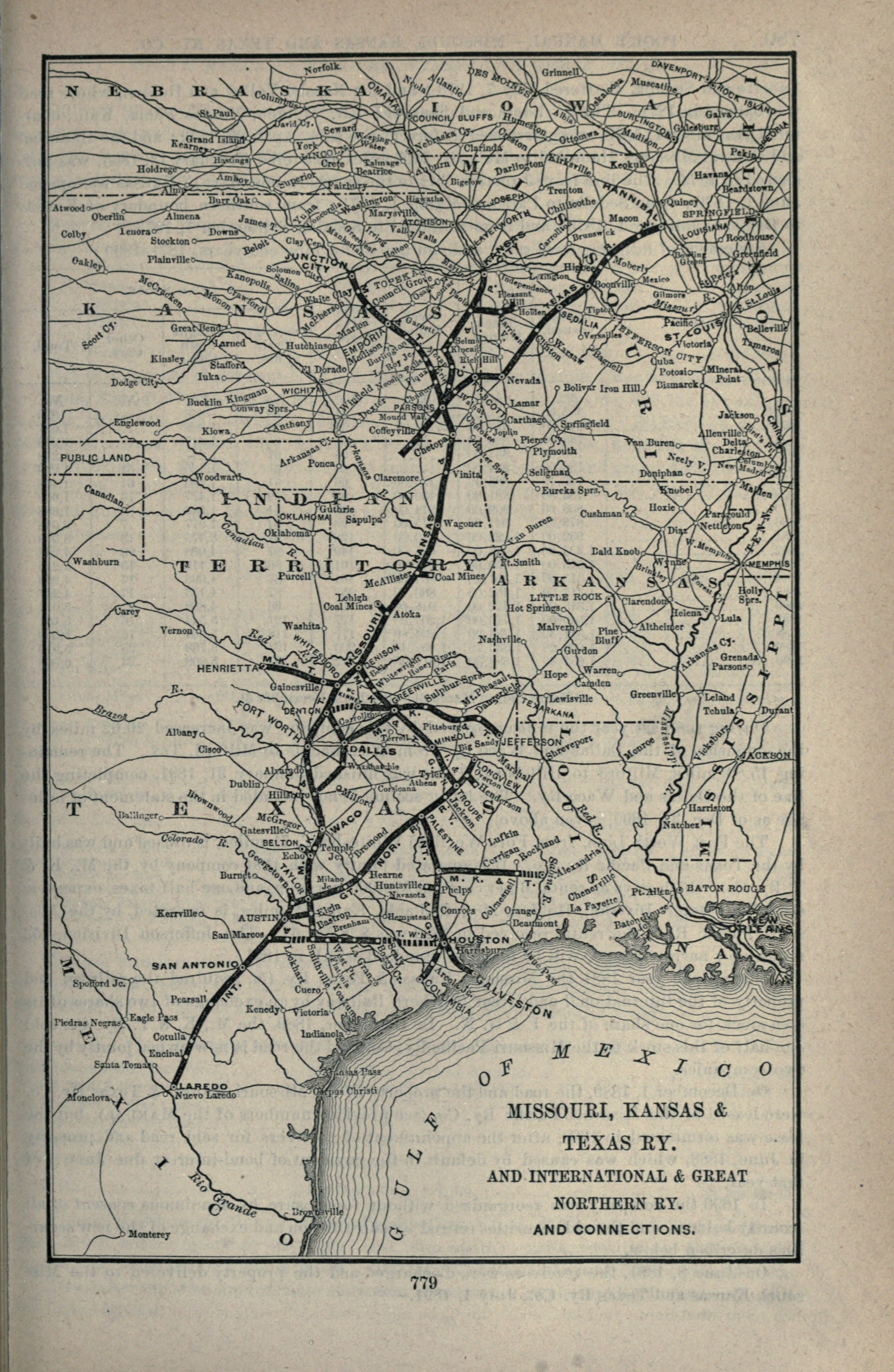
Map showing the location of the Henderson-Overton Branch as a part of the International and Great Northern.

Originally chartered in 1874, the Henderson-Overton Branch was completed in 1877. The line ran 15 miles from a connection with the International and Great Northern Railway in Overton, Texas to Henderson, Texas, with various industries along the way. The Henderson-Overton Branch was acquired by the International and Great Northern on September 27, 1880, and was operated by the latter company until it was consolidated with the newly reorganized International and Great Northern Railway Company on August 31, 1911. Through mergers and acquisitions, the branch was owned by a number of railroads, including the Missouri–Kansas–Texas Railroad, before finally landing with Union Pacific Railroad.

Union Pacific provided notice to abandon the line in 2008, citing lack of traffic on the branch. The Henderson-Overton Branch was subsequently purchased by Rusk County Rail District in 2010. Blacklands Railroad was chosen by Rusk County Rail District to operate the line for the benefit of existing customers, primarily a lumber mill in Henderson, and new businesses which may be interested in locating along the line.

In 2017, Blacklands Railroad established a transload site in Henderson under its Black Gold Terminals subsidiary to help customers in the area gain access to the rail network even if they were not located on the railroad.

HOB commodities include asphalt, steel, lumber, and chemicals.

== Black Gold Terminals ==
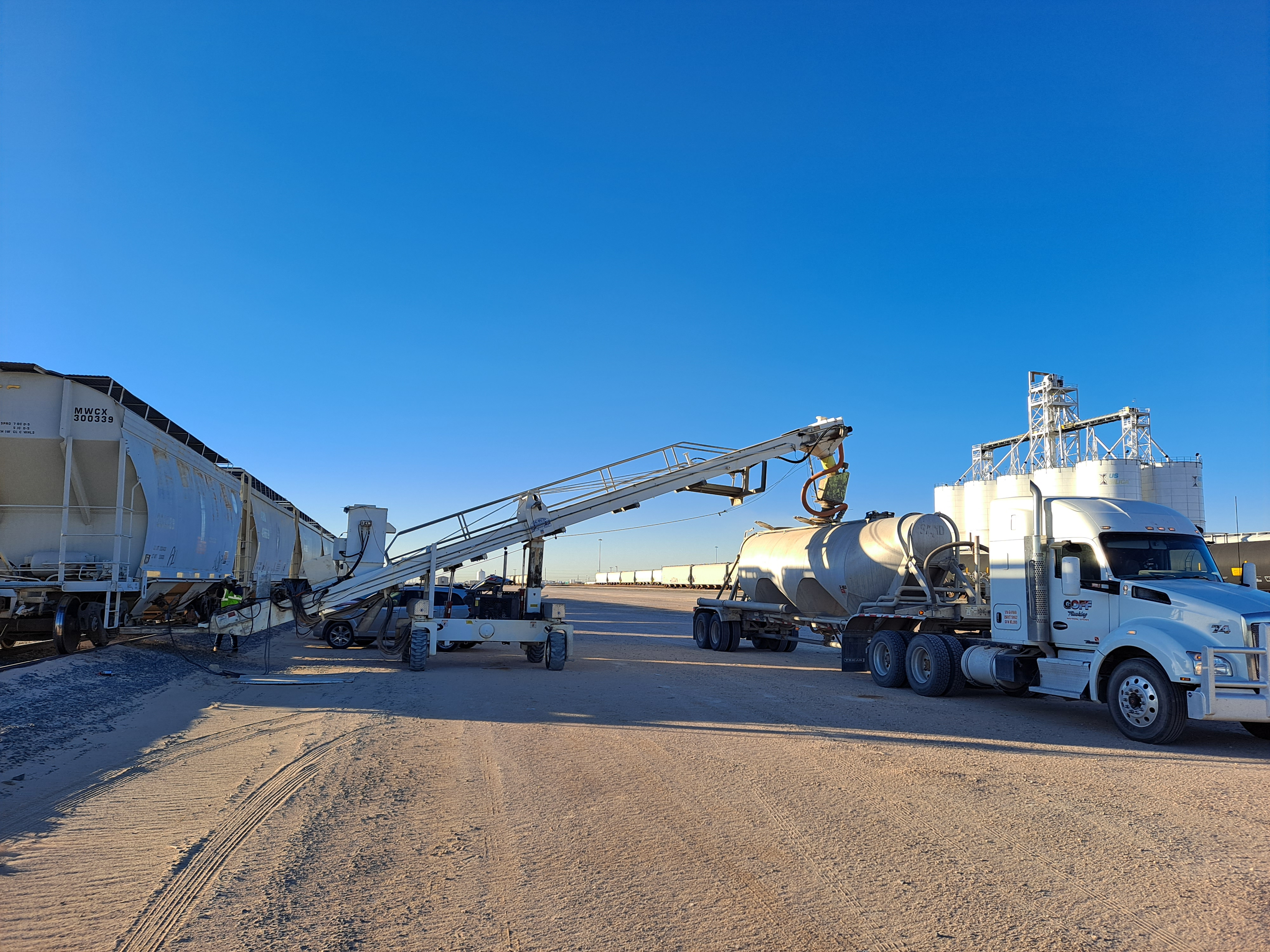
Odessa Transload Yard

Black Gold Terminals was created in 2017 as a subsidiary of Blacklands Railroad. Blacklands Railroad leveraged its knowledge and experience in the rail industry to provide an additional service to shippers looking to move goods by rail, regardless of whether they have direct rail access. Specializing in transloading, contract switching, and industrial rail parks, Black Gold Terminals operates transload facilities in Henderson, Texas; Longview, TX, and Shreveport, LA.
