= Groveton, Lufkin and Northern Railway =

Defunct East Texas shortline railway

Overview
- Main region(s): East Texas
- Parent company: Trinity County Lumber Company
- Dates of operation: December 1, 1908–circa 1932 (Note: Sources differ regarding the abandonment date; Maxwell states 1931, Young states 1932, and Durrenberger states 1934.)
- Predecessor: Texas Northern Railway

Technical
- Track gauge: 4 ft 8 1/2 in (1,435 mm) standard gauge

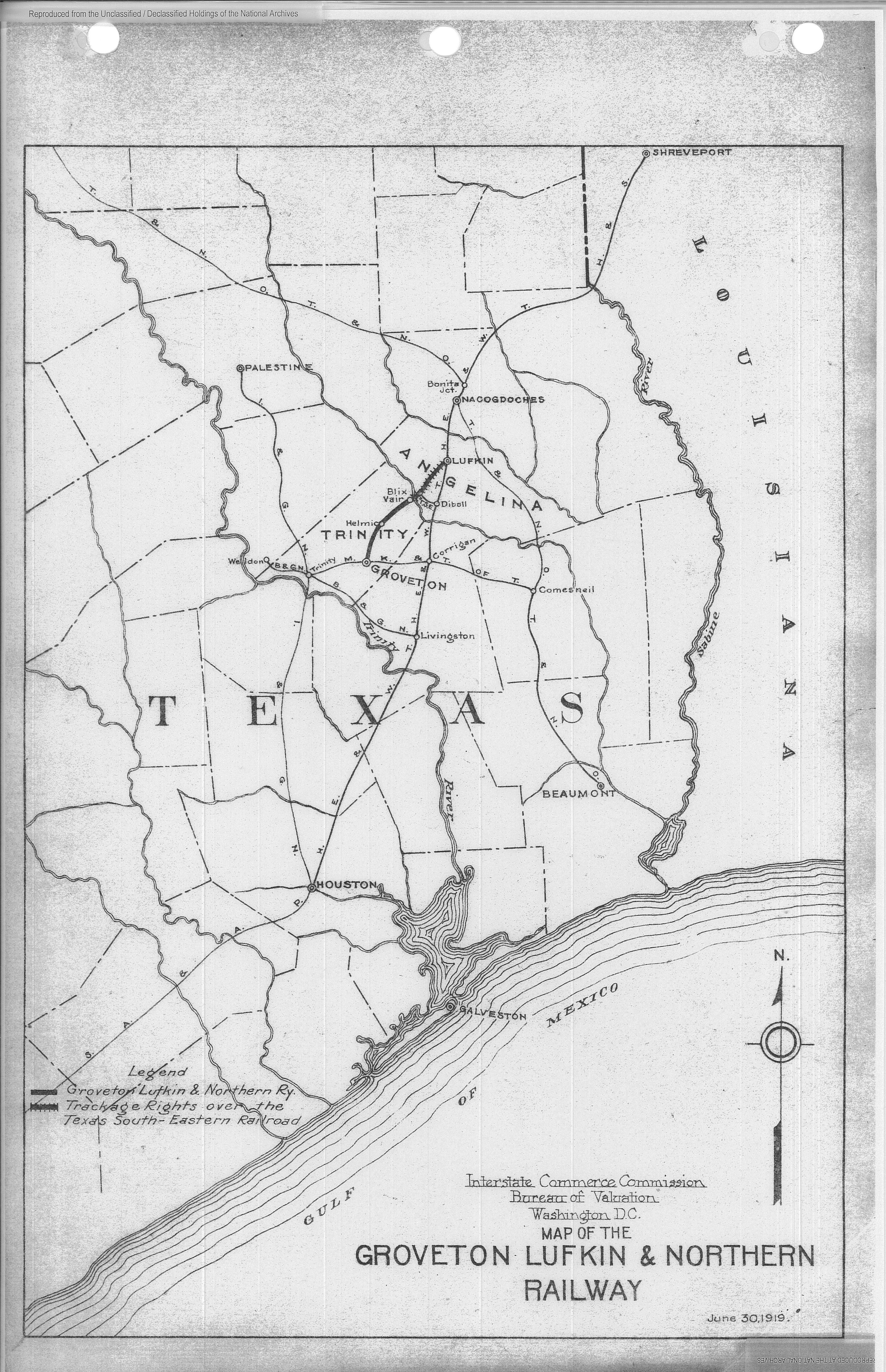
1919 map of the railroad

The Groveton, Lufkin and Northern Railway (GL&N) was a standard gauge U.S. shortline railroad located in East Texas. Originally chartered on May 15, 1908, as the Texas Northern Railway Company, it changed its name on August 17, 1908.

On December 1, 1908, the GL&N purchased the 21-mile (34 km) private logging railroad between Groveton and Vair from the Trinity County Lumber Company, its corporate parent; the rail line had been built in 1900 by lumber company owner James Stanley Joyce to serve the company sawmill near Groveton. The sawmill, one of the largest in the Southern United States, was the predominant local employer. The GL&N upgraded the railroad in 1909 and obtained trackage rights on the Texas South-Eastern Railroad from Vair to Lufkin. In 1926, the GL&N reported owning three locomotives and 104 cars, with passenger earnings of $8,000 (equivalent to $142,100 in 2024) and freight earnings of $233,000 ($4.14 million in 2024).

At Groveton, the GL&N interchanged with a branch line of the Missouri, Kansas and Texas Railway which later became independent as the Waco, Beaumont, Trinity and Sabine Railway (WBT&S).

By the late 1920s, timber in the area had become badly depleted. The Trinity County Lumber Company was able to maintain operations longer than other local lumber companies, but finally capitulated and shut down the sawmill at midnight on December 31, 1930. In 1931, the sawmill was dismantled, the population of Groveton plummeted from around 4,000 to 1,046, and GL&N revenue drastically fell. The GL&N was abandoned sometime between 1931 and 1934.
