= Beaumont, Sour Lake and Western Railway =

Railway line in Texas

Overview
- Headquarters: Beaumont, Texas
- Locale: Texas
- Dates of operation: 1903–1956
- Successor: Missouri Pacific

Technical
- Track gauge: 4 ft 8 1/2 in (1,435 mm) standard gauge

The Beaumont, Sour Lake and Western Railway was an 85-mile (137 km) railroad that ran from Beaumont, Texas to Gulf Coast Junction in Houston. It passed through small southeast Texas communities such as Hull, Kenefick, and Huffman. As part of the Gulf Coast Lines system, the road was eventually merged into the Missouri Pacific Railroad (MP) in 1956, which in turn was merged into the Union Pacific Railroad in 1982. The Union Pacific still makes heavy use of the route.

== History ==
The Gulf Coast Lines were projected originally by B. F. Yoakum, chairman of the board of the Rock Island and Frisco Lines. Yoakum's plan envisioned using the Rock Island and Frisco, together with several railroads to be built in Texas and Louisiana and now known as the Gulf Coast Lines, to form a continuous line of railroad extending from Chicago, St. Louis and Memphis to Baton Rouge, Houston, Brownsville, Tampico and Mexico City.

The Beaumont, Sour Lake and Western Railway Company was chartered as an interurban railway on August 8, 1903, as the Beaumont, Sour Lake and Port Arthur Traction Company. Construction of the Beaumont, Sour Lake and Western section was started at Beaumont in October, 1903. The name was changed on June 30, 1904. R. C. Duff and other financial backers from Columbus, Ohio, and Beaumont, Texas, organized the Traction Company to build an electric line between Port Arthur and Sour Lake. The renamed railroad amended its charter to allow it to connect Beaumont with Port Arthur, Sour Lake, Batson, and Houston, and to transport freight, passengers, mail and express.

However, as Port Arthur seemed increasingly unlikely to overtake Houston as a major shipping center, and as Sour Lake oilfield production declined, some of the original investors lost heart. Yoakum purchased the properties in 1905 and placed them in service to Houston on December 31, 1907, simultaneously with the beginning of operation of the St. Louis, Brownsville and Mexico from Houston to Brownsville.

After joining the Gulf Coast Lines, the BSL&W was extended from Grayburg to Houston in December 1907 despite high water and the threat of yellow fever along the Trinity River. In 1916 the BSL&W reported passenger earnings of $180,000 and freight earnings of $604,000. The eighty-five-mile line became part of the Missouri Pacific system in 1924, but continued to operate as a separate company until merged with the MP on March 1, 1956.

=== Houston North Shore Railway ===
The Houston North Shore Railway (HNS), a BSL&W subsidiary, was the last interurban railway constructed in the United States. The project was conceived by Harry K. Johnson to provide a direct connection from Houston to East Baytown, Goose Creek, and Pelly (the "Tri-Cities" region—later consolidated as Baytown), site of the Goose Creek Oil Field and an oil refinery of the Humble Oil Company. Johnson constructed the HNS as an interurban both to promote residential development of his land holdings around Elena (later renamed as Highlands), and to start construction before other railroads reached the area; an interurban did not require advance approval from the Interstate Commerce Commission (ICC), so construction could start sooner.

Johnson courted other Houston-area railroads to finance construction, as there was no direct rail connection between the Humble Oil refinery and the Port of Houston. On July 28, 1926, Johnson executed a deal to sell the HNS to the MP for $150,000 (equivalent to $2,728,000 in 2025). The HNS was leased to the MP-controlled BSL&W although the lines did not connect. The HNS planned a branch line from Elena to a connection with the BSL&W in Huffman, but more importantly, the BSL&W already had the right to move freight over the Houston Belt and Terminal Railway Company (HB&T), ensuring that the HNS could interchange cars via the HB&T in Houston. The branch to Huffman was never built.

HNS operations began in 1927. In 1929, the HNS was dealt severe setbacks by the onset of the Great Depression and the completion of a paved road linking Houston to Goose Creek; passenger traffic immediately fell. In 1931, the HNS's rail connection to downtown Houston was severed by the removal of the Lyons Avenue streetcar line it shared, and buses from downtown to an HNS transfer station just inside Houston city limits were substituted. In 1932, the HNS lost $44,120 operating passenger cars (equivalent to $1,041,000 in 2025). In 1933, the HNS initiated service cuts, but it had purchased a considerable portion of its right of way with deed restrictions requiring the operation of passenger service at two-hour intervals, which triggered a lawsuit by a large area landowner. The HNS could eliminate the deed restrictions by eminent domain, but at a high cost. Management decided to negotiate with individual landowners and seek other ways to cut costs. By the late 1930s, the HNS was turning a net operating profit, and losses on passenger service had been reduced but remained high—around $32,000 annually (equivalent to $730,000 in 2025).

In 1940, Evans autorailers were introduced on the downtown Houston service. In 1941, the MP made an application to the Railroad Commission of Texas to end passenger service, but the effort was dropped due to opposition from Johnson, who was still promoting land development in Highlands, and to avoid antagonizing Humble Oil, which originated most HNS freight; many refinery employees used the HNS to commute to work. The onset of World War II increased freight traffic from the refinery to such a degree that the HNS's electric freight locomotives could no longer handle the volume. In 1942, the MP/BSL&W began using steam locomotives and installed the infrastructure to service them; the electric locomotives were relegated to maintenance of way work, and soon after the war ended, freight operations were dieselized.

The HNS overhead catenary and substations had become dilapidated and were now only needed for the unprofitable passenger service. In 1945, the MP decided to scrap the electrical infrastructure and substitute railbuses for the electric interurban cars, but this effort was delayed by the need to amend the BSL&W lease and seek approval from the ICC. In 1948, electric operations ended, and Twin Coach railbuses were introduced. The HNS was merged into the MP in March 1956 along with the BSL&W; railbus operations finally ended in 1961. Much of the HNS remains in operation as a Union Pacific Railroad branch line.

== Current ==
This railway is now owned and operated by Union Pacific Railroad, successor to MoPac. The tracks are part of the UP Beaumont Subdivision. Predominantly a single track railroad with limited sidings, it is normally restricted to northbound and eastbound traffic, averaging around 15 trains daily including Amtrak's eastbound Sunset Limited. Canadian Pacific Kansas City and BNSF has trackage rights at the Beaumont Sub.

Amtrak's Sunset Limited service westbound and both westbound and southbound UP, CPKC, and BNSF trains run the Sunset Route (UP Houston Subdivision).
