= Marshall and East Texas Railway =

Former American shortline railway based in Texas

Marshall & East Texas Railway
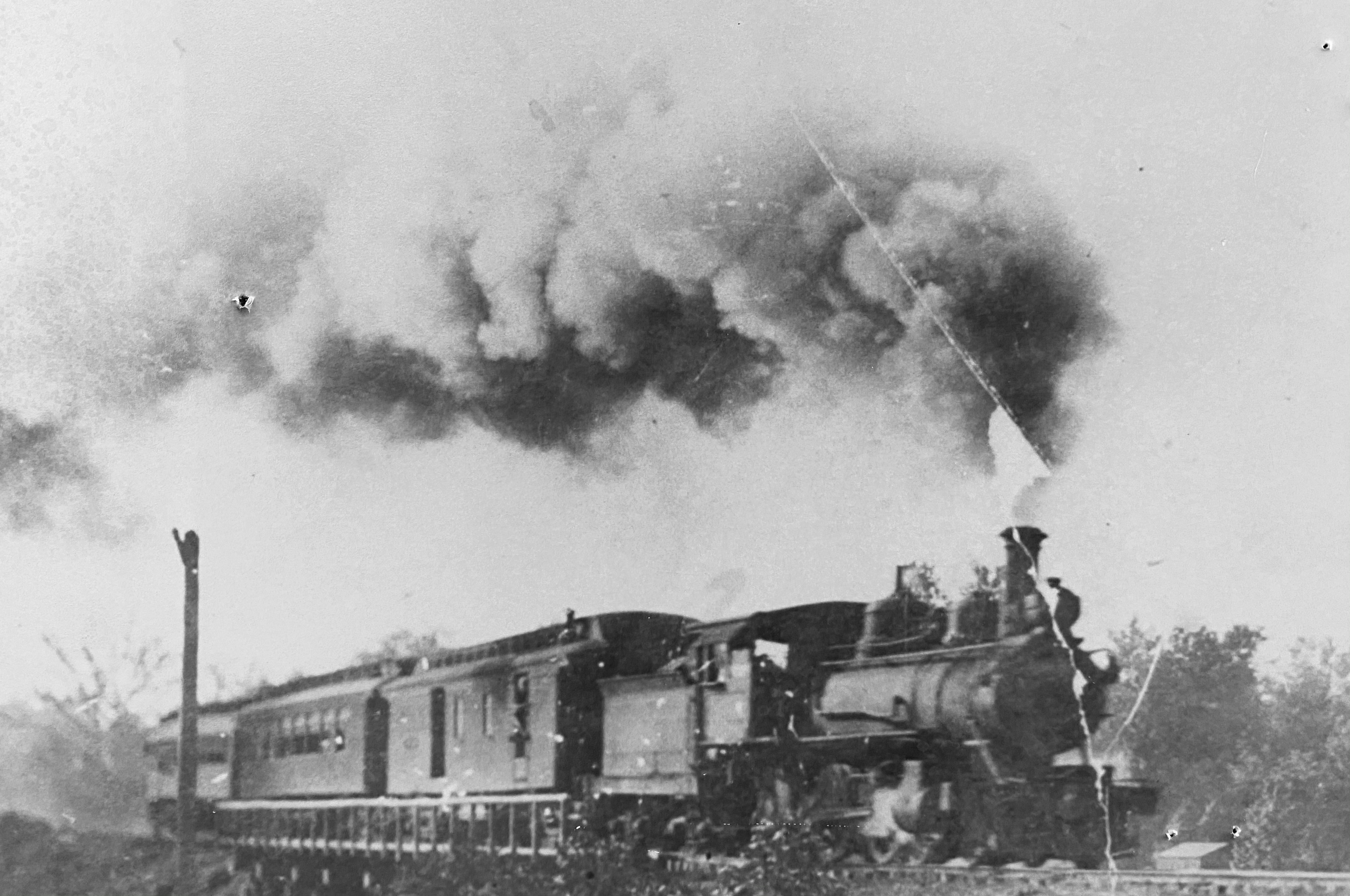

Overview
- Headquarters: Marshall, Texas
- Locale: East Texas
- Dates of operation: 1908-1918

Technical
- Track gauge: 4 ft 8½ in (1,435 mm) standard gauge

The Marshall and East Texas Railway, now defunct, was an American shortline railway based in Marshall, Texas.

== History ==
The Marshall and East Texas Railway Company was charted on August 17, 1908, to purchase the Texas Southern Railway. The railway extended from Winnsboro to Marshall, Texas, a total length of 72.5 miles (116.7 km). In 1909, the railway extended the line from Marshall to Elysian Fields, Texas, adding 19 miles (31 km) to the railway's length.

On Monday October 18, 1915, passenger train #2 derailed off a trestle a few miles east of Harleton at around 5:20 p.m. The train consisted of locomotive No. 57, combine car No. 1, and coach car No. 2. The train crew consisted of engineer Barney Clark, fireman Willie Law, conductor Cliff Riden, porter Joe Jenkins, and newsbutch Joe Miller. The two passenger cars landed upside down in the muck, while the locomotive did not derail at all. A total of 11 people were injured, and conductor Cliff Riden would later pass away from his injuries on Friday October 22, 1915. The M&ET had a special train out of Marshall with a number of doctors and nurses to help treat the injured. In response to his death, the Riden family sued the railway. With lumber being depleted off the line and the lawsuit, the railway went into receivership on January 25, 1917, with Bryan Snyder appointed receiver. In July of that year, the M&ET was put up for auction, with no bidders. The segment of line between East Winnsboro and Gilmer was sold to the Winnsboro and Gilmer Railroad Company, but this railroad never operated and forfeited in 1923. The segment between Marshall and Elysian Fields was sold to the Marshall, Elysian Fields and Southeastern Railway, which operated between 1922 and 1945. The rolling stock was either sold off or scrapped and the only known surviving piece of rolling stock from the M&ET is coach #5 which is currently located at the Pacific Southwest Railway Museum in Campo, California. Two miles (3.2 km) of track and the Marshall terminal were sold to the Texas and Pacific Railway.

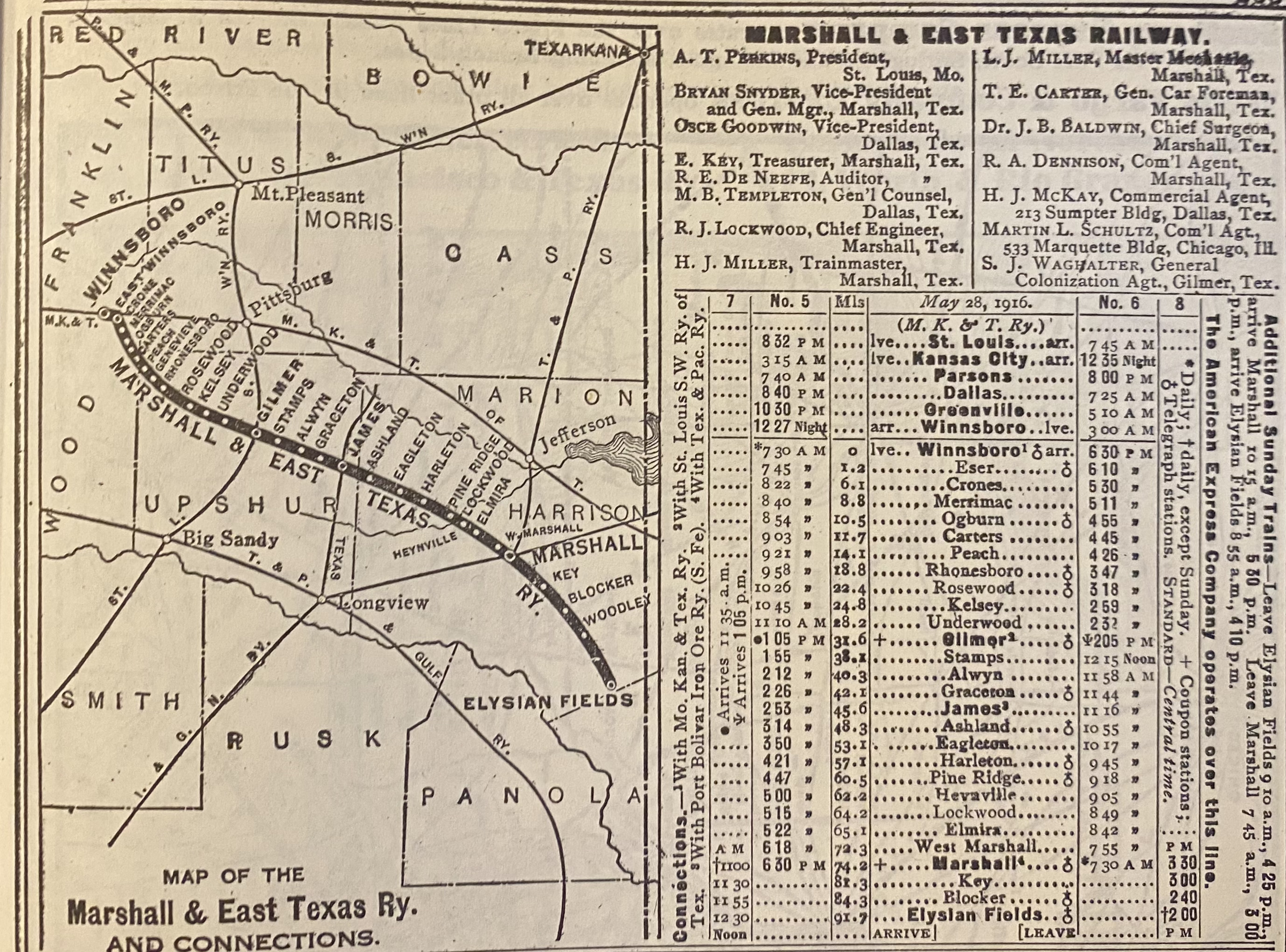
Marshall and East Texas Railway Map and Timetable

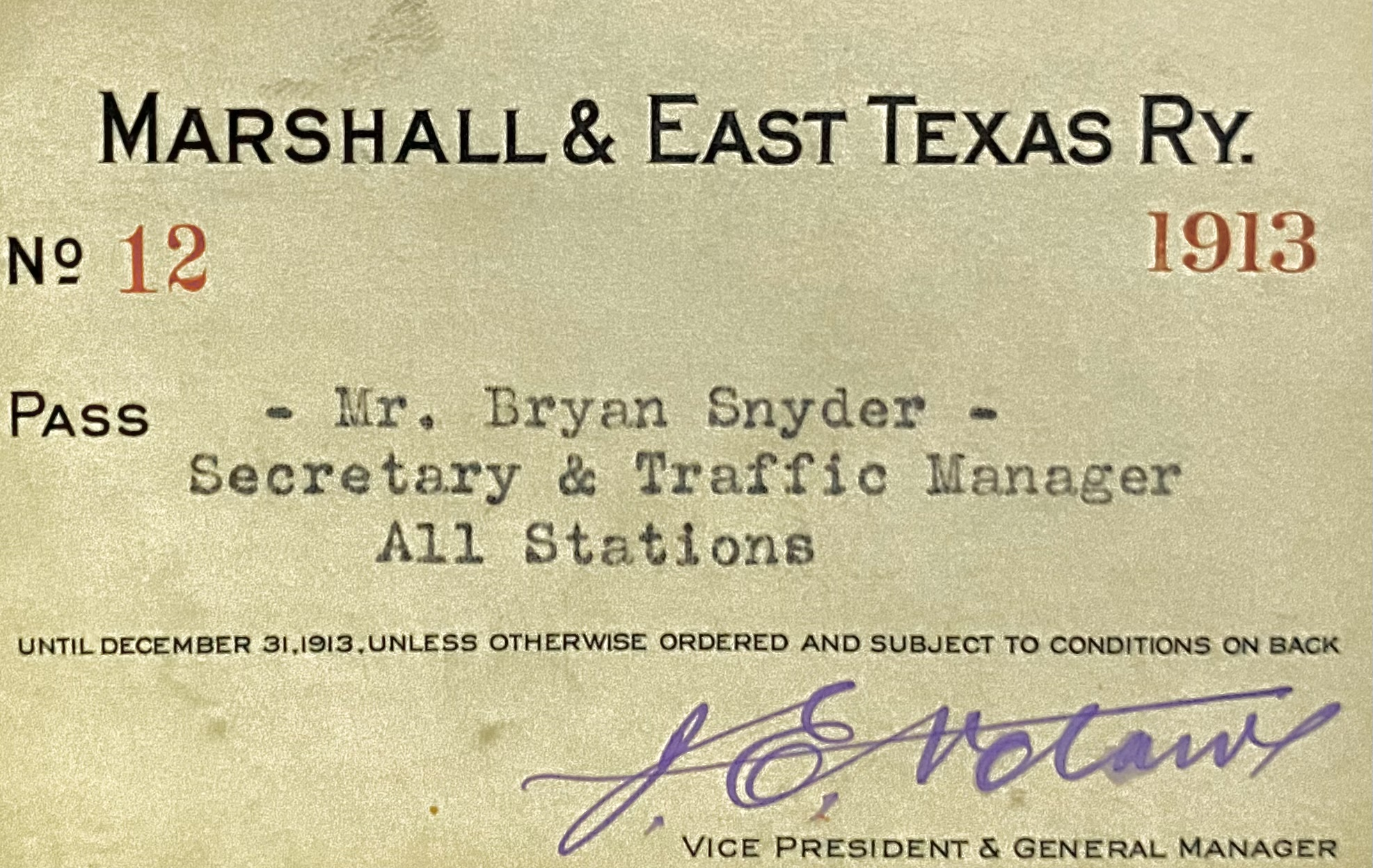
Marshall and East Texas Railway Pass

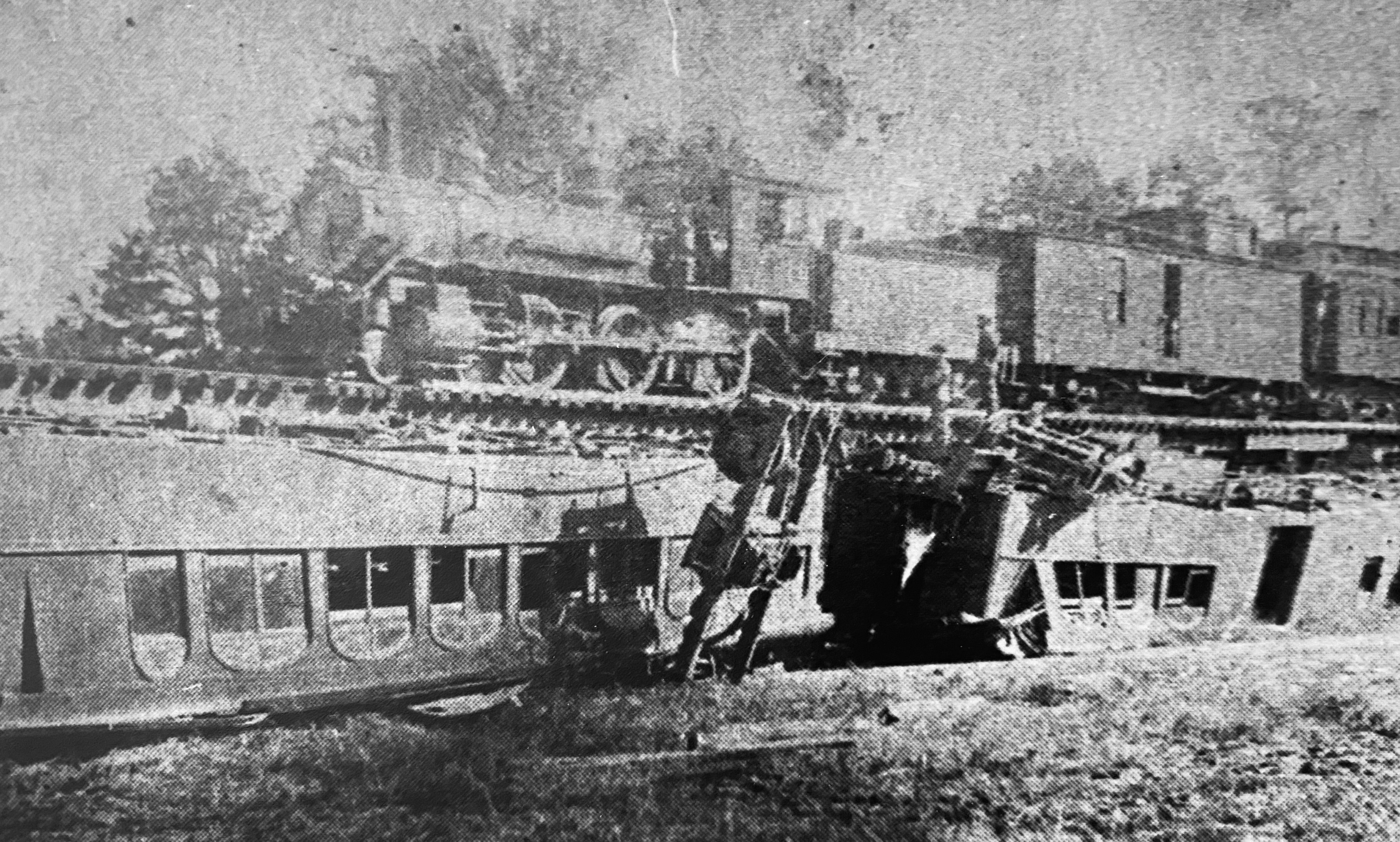
M&ET Wreck
