= Texas Southern Railway =

Defunct railway in Marshall, Texas

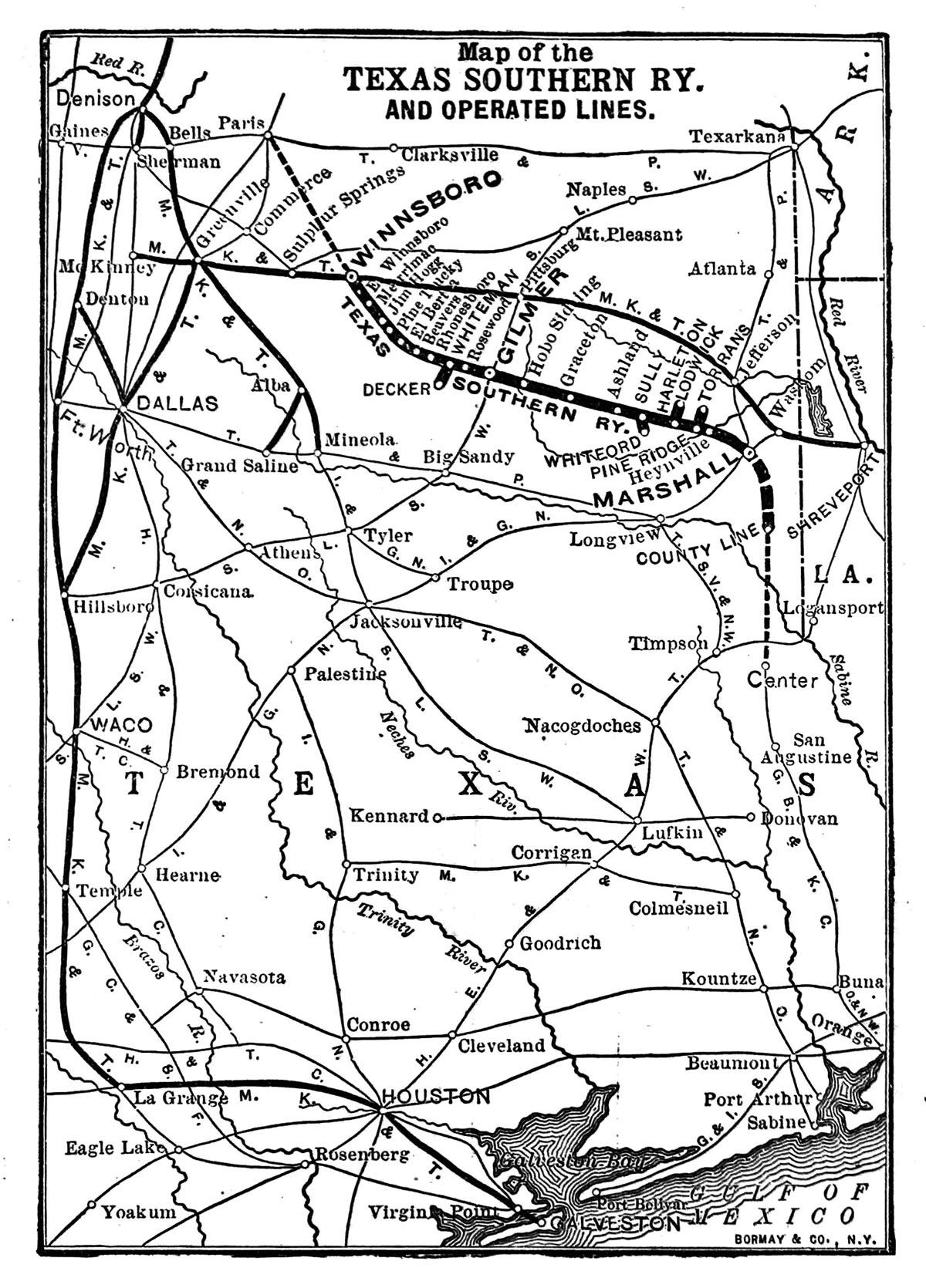

Overview
- Locale: East Texas
- Dates of operation: 1897-1908

Technical
- Track gauge: 4 ft 8 1/2 in (1,435 mm) standard gauge

The Texas Southern Railway, now defunct, was an American shortline railroad based in Marshall, Texas.

The Texas Southern Railway was chartered on March 12, 1897, to take over the Paris, Marshall and Sabine Pass Railway. The railway only extended from Marshall to a small community called Harleton.

It was soon decided to extended the railway west towards Winnsboro. To do so, the Texas Southern began purchasing many smaller logging trams near Gilmer and Winnsboro. The Commercial Lumber Company of Gilmer was purchased in 1897 by the Texas Southern. Out of the original 16 miles of line built by the Commercial Lumber Company, only three miles were used. The rest of the line was deemed too steep and sharp to be of use. After Gilmer, the railway continued construction to Winnsboro. Many communities combined together when the railway came through. This led to the founding of Kelsey, Rosewood, and Rhonesboro, Texas. In 1901, the Texas Southern reached Winnsboro, where it connected with the Missouri, Kansas, and Texas Railroad. On June 15, 1902, the first passenger train operated over the entire line. In 1904, the railway owned 73.7 miles (118.6 km) of track between Marshall and Winnsboro.

1902 to 1904 were the best years for the railway. In 1904, however, it entered receivership. Eventually, the company was sold to the Marshall and East Texas Railway on August 17, 1908.
