= Waco, Beaumont, Trinity and Sabine Railway =

East Texas shortline railway

Overview
- Main region(s): East Texas
- Headquarters: Trinity, Texas
- Key people: William Carlisle; Paul T. Sanderson; T.L. Epperson
- Founders: R.C. Duff
- Dates of operation: April 1, 1923–1959
- Predecessor: Missouri, Kansas and Texas Railway

Technical
- Track gauge: 4 ft 8 1/2 in (1,435 mm) standard gauge
- Length: 115 miles (185 km)

The Waco, Beaumont, Trinity and Sabine Railway (WBT&S) was a standard gauge U.S. shortline railroad located in East Texas. The company was formed from two earlier shortlines that interchanged in Trinity, Texas, and had come under the control of the Missouri, Kansas and Texas Railway, but were spun off in 1923 as part of that company's bankruptcy reorganization. The WBT&S itself declared bankruptcy in 1930 and would operate under receivership for the rest of its existence—the longest bankruptcy in Texas rail history.

The line became characterized by financial hardship; by the late 1940s, most of the system had been abandoned, passenger and mail service was reduced to an improvised railcar built from a Ford Model A, and its track was so dilapidated that locals sarcastically referred to the line as the Wobble, Bobble, Turnover and Stop, alternately the Wobbly, Bobbly, Turnover and Stop or the Wobblety, Bobblety, Turnover and Stop, often shortened to the Wobbly or the Wobblety. Another nickname was Won't be Back 'Til Saturday. In 1959, the railroad's sole operable locomotive failed an Interstate Commerce Commission safety inspection, and its trains never ran again. Little trace of the Wobbly remains today; all rails except some industrial and yard tracks in Trinity were removed between 1959 and 1972, and all buildings were demolished by 1986, but the Wobbly's last locomotive has been preserved and is displayed at the Galveston Railroad Museum.

== History ==
=== Predecessors ===
The first of two shortlines that would later constitute the WBT&S was the Trinity and Sabine Railway (T&S), which was chartered in 1881 to move timber via the International–Great Northern Railroad (IGN), which operated as part of the Missouri Pacific Railroad (MP) system. Jay Gould, the railroad magnate who controlled the MP, the IGN, and Missouri, Kansas and Texas Railway (MK&T, popularly known as the Katy), purchased the incomplete T&S on December 9, 1882, and sold it later that same day to the MK&T. The purchase did nothing to increase traffic on the Katy main line through Waco about 100 miles (160 km) away, and there was no plan to connect the lines; the T&S was intended solely to funnel traffic to the IGN. In 1884, the 66-mile (106 km) line from Trinity to Colmesneil was completed at a cost of $2,640,000 ($92.4 million in 2024), with the MP acting as the construction contractor. Historian V.V. Masterson writes that this was part of a complex scheme by Gould to strengthen the MP using MK&T capital—a scheme Masterson describes as the "systematic looting" of the Katy. The T&S became popularly known as the "orphan division" or "orphan Katy" due to its isolation from the bulk of the Katy system.

The second WBT&S ancestor was the Beaumont and Great Northern Railroad (B&GN), founded in 1905, the brainchild of William Carlisle, a lumber magnate who owned two sawmills, 140,000 acres (57,000 ha) of prime timberland, and a headquarters in Onalaska, near the planned railway's midpoint. The BG&N built a 48-mile (77 km) rail line from Weldon through Trinity and Onalaska to Livingston. The company was soon taken over by Beaumont lawyer and board member R.C. Duff, who envisioned extending it westwards to Waco and southwards to Beaumont and Sabine Pass, Port Arthur, where it would connect to the Gulf of Mexico. Duff was unable to adequately fund his ambitions and sold the railway back to Carlisle, but Duff later convinced Carlisle that the line could be sold to the Katy. Carlisle sold his interest back to Duff, who in turn initiated sale to the MK&T, but the Katy was mired in an antitrust lawsuit with the state of Texas and had to put the purchase on hold. In 1914, the Katy resolved the lawsuit, purchased the BG&N, and leased it for 99 years.

A considerable amount of traffic was generated by a large sawmill operated by the Texas Long Leaf Lumber Company (TLLLC) in Trinity, where the MK&T connected to an extensive network of TLLLC logging railroads. Despite this, the isolated branch lines were not profitable. The Katy entered receivership in 1915, largely due to overexpansion, and formulated a plan to spin off less profitable branches. The reorganization was put on hold by the 1917 nationalization of the U.S. rail system prompted by World War I, but was restarted when the government relinquished control of the nation's railroads in 1920. In 1922, the Katy petitioned the Interstate Commerce Commission (ICC) to allow the abandonment of the BG&N and T&S, but the agency deemed the lines vital to the economy of the area and would not permit it.

=== Independence and bankruptcy ===
In 1923, the Katy sold the former BG&N to Duff, who revived his plan to extend the railroad to Central Texas and the Gulf of Mexico, naming it the Waco, Beaumont, Trinity and Sabine Railway. Independent operations started on April 1, 1923. Later that year, Duff purchased the former T&S for $100,000 ($1.85 million in 2024)—a small fraction of its construction cost—and merged it with the WBT&S in 1924. Duff is rumored not to have paid the Katy the full $100,000, but the MKT (Note: As part of its reorganization, the Missouri, Kansas and Texas Railway was renamed the Missouri–Kansas–Texas Railroad or MKT.) is said not to have pressed the matter because of its heavy and persistent losses operating the railroad.

The WBT&S interchanged with the MP at Trinity, the Groveton, Lufkin, and Northern Railway (GL&N) at Groveton, the Texas and New Orleans Railroad (T&NO) at Colmesneil, and the Houston, East and West Texas Railway (HE&WT) at Corrigan and Livingston. The HE&WT and T&NO were part of the Southern Pacific Railroad (SP) system.

In 1926, the WBT&S reported earnings of $25,802 ($458,277 in 2024) from passenger service and $243,020 ($4.32 million in 2024) from freight. However, it was consistently losing money after expenses. In 1927, Duff obtained approval from the ICC for his extension plan, but he was unable to raise adequate funds and no construction was ever undertaken. (Of the four locations in the Waco, Beaumont, Trinity and Sabine name, the only one the railroad ever served was the city of Trinity.)

In 1930, the depletion of local timber and the onset of the Great Depression plunged the railroad into bankruptcy. Duff was forced out and TLLLC president Paul T. Sanderson was appointed receiver. In 1931 the Trinity County Lumber Company, which owned the GL&N, closed its sawmill; the GL&N, which interchanged with the former T&S Trinity–Colmesneil line, was abandoned soon thereafter. (Note: Sources differ regarding the GL&N abandonment date; Maxwell states 1931, Young states 1932, and Durrenberger states 1934.) Minimal traffic remained on the former T&S, and in 1936, it was abandoned in its entirety.

In 1941, the former BG&N west of Trinity was truncated from Weldon to Kittrell. In 1944, Sanderson died and T.L. Epperson of Trinity was appointed receiver. Around this time, passenger and mail service from Trinity to Livingston had been reduced to an improvised railcar built from a Ford Model A, which towed an improvised trailer to comply with Jim Crow laws regarding carriage of Black passengers.

Remaining major WBT&S customers were a sand refining plant at Luce (near Sebastopol), pulpwood yards in several locations, a basket plant and a box plant in Trinity, and crude oil and mineral oil loading in Kittrell. In 1945, the Humble Oil Company crude oil loading rack at Kittrell shut down. In 1948, the Wobbly was earning some revenue by convincing local businesses to consign freight shipped on the MP to the WBT&S Trinity depot although the freight was not actually handled by WBT&S trains. In 1949, 23.6 miles (38.0 km) of the former BG&N from Livingston to Luce was removed, severing the line's remaining connection to the SP.

By this time, the Wobbly was operating trains infrequently, and derailments were a constant problem due to minimal maintenance. The WBT&S suffered another blow when the Luce sand plant burned and was not rebuilt because changing oil drilling techniques had reduced the demand for its products. The TLLLC sawmill in Trinity, a major WBT&S customer, shut down in 1955.

In 1959, the Wobbly's sole operable steam locomotive failed an ICC safety inspection, and operations ceased permanently. The company operated under receivership from 1930 until its books were finally closed in 1961—the longest bankruptcy in Texas rail history.

=== Post-abandonment ===
Most WBT&S track was removed by 1961. The only significant remainder was a 5-mile (8.0 km) section purchased by the Trinity Chamber of Commerce with the main objective of maintaining rail service to the American Box Company, a major local employer. By 1972, most of the five miles had been removed, and the 1,250 feet (380 m) of track from the MP main line to the box plant was the only significant remnant of the Wobbly system.

== Equipment and facilities ==
When it commenced operations in 1923, the WBT&S equipment roster consisted of six 2-6-0 steam locomotives inherited secondhand from the MKT and B&GN, numbered 101–106. For passenger service, it had four passenger coaches, a combination car, and two baggage cars. For freight and maintenance of way, the railroad had 17 boxcars, nine flatcars, two cabooses, and two maintenance cars.

In 1933, the WBT&S obtained two ex-IGN 4-6-0 locomotives, which retained their IGN numbers of 273 and 277; the remaining 2‑6‑0s were taken out of service and later scrapped. Between 1934 and 1939, all WBT&S freight and passenger cars were taken out of service; only two cabooses and two unidentified cars classified as "miscellaneous" remained.

In 1948, a small 2-6-2 built by Baldwin Locomotive Works in 1920, numbered 1, was obtained from a logging railroad; this was the engine condemned by the ICC in 1959. After the Wobbly shut down, it was abandoned to rust away in the Trinity yard. In 1981, it was donated to the Galveston Railroad Museum and cosmetically restored, and as of 2023, it is on public display there.

The two most significant WBT&S buildings were located in Trinity near the IGN/MP main line: an enginehouse and shop, and a large two-story combination depot and office building with the company headquarters on the second floor. The depot and offices were removed sometime before September 1972; the enginehouse, the Wobbly's last remaining structure, was demolished in 1986.
