= Denison, Bonham and New Orleans Railroad =

North Texas shortline railway

Overview
- Main region: North Texas
- Parent company: Missouri, Kansas and Texas Railway
- Headquarters: Denison, Texas
- Dates of operation: 1901–November 30, 1928
- Predecessor: Denison, Bonham, and New Orleans Railway (never completed)

Technical
- Track gauge: 4 ft 8 1/2 in (1,435 mm) standard gauge
- Length: 24 miles (39 km)

The Denison, Bonham and New Orleans Railroad (DB&NO) was a standard gauge US shortline railroad located in North Texas. It was nicknamed "Nellie". The DB&NO operated from Bonham Junction on the Missouri, Kansas and Texas Railway (MK&T) east of Denison, Texas, to a connection with the Texas and Pacific Railway in Bonham, Texas. The DB&NO was initially operated and later leased by the MK&T, but was spun off in 1923 as part of that company's reorganization. It was purchased in 1925 by a group of Bonham citizens and ceased operations in 1928.

== History ==
The Denison, Bonham and New Orleans Railroad Company (DB&NO) was chartered on January, 24, 1901, to build from Denison Texas, to Bonham and Wolfe City, using the right-of-way and partially completed roadbed of the Denison, Bonham and New Orleans Railway. This company had been chartered on January 19, 1887, to build a line from Denison Junction to Charleston in Delta County, Texas, and had initiated construction in the Denison area, but folded in 1888 before laying track. Capital stock of the new company was $100,000 (equivalent to $3,870,000 in 2025).

The DB&NO Railroad was backed by the Missouri, Kansas and Texas Railway of Texas (Note: At the time, Article X of the Texas Constitution required railroads operating in Texas to be headquartered in the state, so larger interstate systems such as the MK&T and MO&G operated by establishing subsidiaries in Texas.) (MK&T) and was built by an MK&T subsidiary which was paid in DB&NO stocks and bonds. The MK&T already had a terminal in Denison and a line extending east to Greenville. Instead of using the entire 1887 grade into Denison, a junction was built on the MK&T about 5 miles (8 km) east of Denison and a new grade about 2 miles (3 km) long was built eastward to a point on the partially completed 1887 grade, thereby reducing the length of the DB&NO and its construction cost. The new junction was named Bonham Junction but became known as "Bona".

In 1901, 24 miles (39 km) of track between Bonham Junction and Bonham was completed, and the MK&T began operating the line. Stations were located at Ambrose and Ravenna. The main line was never extended to Wolfe City. On January 27, 1907, the company's charter was amended to include a proposed branch line from Ravenna to Gilmer, Texas, but it was never built. In 1910, the unused 1887 grade into Denison was sold to the Missouri, Oklahoma and Gulf Railway of Texas (MO&G); the old alignment met the DB&NO about 2 miles (3 km) southwest of Carpenter's Bluff, where the MO&G would build a bridge over the Red River to connect to the MO&G system north of the river in Oklahoma. A junction was built where the new MO&G alignment curved away to the north; as a condition of the sale, the DB&NO obtained trackage rights over the MO&G into Denison, but it is unknown whether this privilege was ever exercised. On May 1, 1914, the MK&T leased the DB&NO outright.

On April 1, 1923, the MK&T reorganized and spun off the DB&NO along with six other Texas subsidiaries; MK&T operations ceased and the DB&NO went into receivership. On February 6, 1925, the DB&NO was purchased out of receivership by a group of Bonham citizens for $75,000 (equivalent to $1,377,000 in 2025), consisting of $5,000 in cash and the remainder as a promissory note. The new owners obtained two locomotives and one freight car, hauling corn, cotton, cottonseed meal, watermelons, potatoes, and peanuts. The owners were only able to pay back $17,000 of the promissory note, and operations ceased permanently when the Interstate Commerce Commission approved the line's abandonment on November 30, 1928.

== See also ==
- The Truman Area Community Network – Corporate History: Missouri Kansas & Texas Railway – Denison, Bonham and New Orleans Railroad Company "This corporate history does not include the reorganization of 1923 and subsequent corporate changes."
- Herald Democrat, 2006-07-30 Historical events in Grayson County, as recorded in “History of Grayson County Texas by Grayson County Frontier Village”: “Ambrose, Texas History,” by Mrs. Tony Pace and Mrs. Ruth Whitlock
