= Galveston, Houston and Henderson Railroad =

Overview
- Locale: Texas
- Dates of operation: 1859–
- Successor: Missouri Pacific Railroad

Technical
- Track gauge: 1,435 mm (4 ft 8 1/2 in) standard gauge

The Galveston, Houston and Henderson Railroad was the first railway to operate between Houston and Galveston. Sometimes known as the "Old Reliable Short Line," service commenced around 1859 and operated for 136 years under its original charter. Later the railroad was acquired by the Missouri Pacific Railroad and part of old right-of-way is operated as part of the Union Pacific Railroad.

== History ==
The Galveston, Henderson and Houston Railroad was granted its charter on 7 February 1853. Named for its main destinations, Galveston, Houston, and Henderson, construction of the road began in 1857 and service between Virginia Point, Texas and Houston was available about two years later. This section of road over the coastal plain was both flat and straight. The railway was assisted by Galveston County funding, which financed the construction of a causeway of the broad channel between Virginia Point and Galveston Island. The railway started service between Galveston and Houston in 1860.

The railway remained mostly under control of the Confederate States of America (CSA) during the American Civil War.

More recently, most of original Galveston, Houston and Henderson right-of-way running between the Island and Bayou cities has been a property of the Union Pacific Railroad known as the Galveston Subdivision. This legacy rail track is 47 miles long and lies just east of I-45 while running parallel to it. The Galveston Subdivision has principal connections to the Houston regional freight network at its junction with the West Belt Subdivision and at its junction with the Union Pacific Railroad Galveston at Virginia Point. Even though it is mostly single-track with occasional sidings, the Union Pacific reported an average of fifteen to twenty-five trains per day in 2005.
