= Texas, Gonzales and Northern Railway =

Texan railroad

Overview
- Headquarters: Gonzales, Texas
- Reporting mark: TXGN
- Locale: Texas
- Dates of operation: 1992–

Technical
- Track gauge: 4 ft 8 1/2 in (1,435 mm) standard gauge

The Texas, Gonzales and Northern Railway is a short-line railroad that operates 12.3 miles (19.8 km) of track between Harwood, Texas and Gonzales, Texas.
