= St. Louis, San Francisco and Texas Railway =

Railway line in Texas, USA

St. Louis, San Francisco and Texas
Overview
- Headquarters: Springfield, Missouri
- Reporting mark: SLSF
- Locale: Texas
- Successor: Burlington Northern Railroad

Technical
- Track gauge: 4 ft 8 1/2 in (1,435 mm) standard gauge

The St. Louis, San Francisco and Texas Railway (reporting mark SLSF) was a subsidiary railway to the St. Louis-San Francisco Railway (Frisco) operating 159 miles of railway line in Texas. The Frisco, including the subsidiary, formed a large X-shaped system across the states of Kansas, Missouri, Oklahoma, Texas, Arkansas, Mississippi and Alabama. It merged into SLSF at the beginning of 1964; SLSF merged into the Burlington Northern Railroad in 1980.
