= Western Rail Road =

Shortline railroad in Texas, U.S.

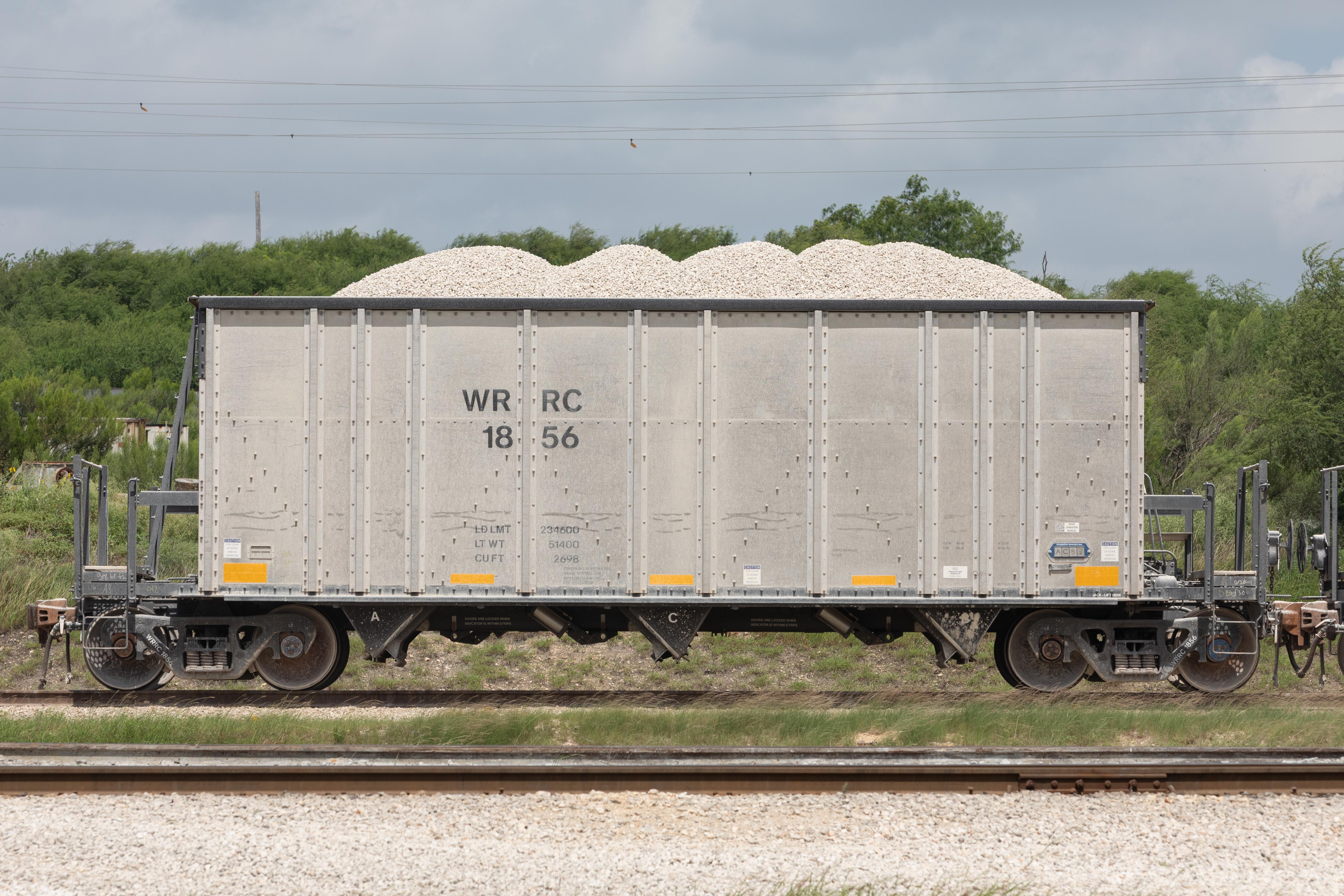
- A WRRC aggregate hopper in Dittlinger, Texas.

Overview
- Headquarters: New Braunfels, Texas
- Reporting mark: WRRC
- Locale: Central Texas
- Dates of operation: 1976–

Technical
- Track gauge: 4 ft 8 1/2 in (1,435 mm) standard gauge

The Western Rail Road (reporting mark WRRC) is a 1.9-mile (3.1 km) shortline railroad owned by Cemex that connects a Cemex quarry and cement plant at Dittlinger, Texas (just south of New Braunfels), to the Austin Subdivision of the Union Pacific Railroad (UP). The company was incorporated in March 1974 as the PB Railroad, and the present name was adopted in September 1975. The line was completed by the end of 1976, connecting the quarry and plant to the parallel Missouri Pacific Railroad and Missouri-Kansas-Texas Railroad lines (now both UP).
