= Alamo Gulf Coast Railroad =

Short-line railroad in Texas

Overview
- Headquarters: San Antonio, Texas
- Reporting mark: AGCR
- Locale: Texas

Technical
- Track gauge: 4 ft 8 1/2 in (1,435 mm) (standard gauge)

The Alamo Gulf Coast Railroad (reporting mark AGCR) is a short-line railroad headquartered in San Antonio, Texas. It is a subsidiary of Martin Marietta Materials, a spinoff of Lockheed Martin., and began operation in 1996.

The AGCR operates on about 6.75 miles (10.86 km) of trackage within the Martin Marietta Beckmann Quarry in San Antonio, Texas. The AGCR moves limestone and aggregates within the Backmann Quarry to form trains for the Union Pacific Railroad to haul out. Industrial operations are not normally considered railroads, but the AGCR is because, before the closure of the northern end of the quarry and the construction of The RIM shopping center, it served two lumberyards near Camp Bullis Rd. when it previously leased the Union Pacific Camp Stanley Industrial Lead Subdivision from milepost 15 to milepost 22.54. What was the Camp Stanley Industrial Lead now ends at the edge of the quarry property about 3/4 mile (1.2 km) from where it began and has since had its ownership turned over to the AGCR. The tracks into the currently active quarry were built in the 1990s, then later expanded to form a loop in the mid-2000s.

The AGCR connects to the Union Pacific Kerrville Subdivision at milepost 15, about 25 feet from the Loop 1604 frontage road, after the bridge. The Kerrville Subdivision was originally built in 1890 by the San Antonio and Aransas Pass Railway, and went all the way through Boerne to Kerrville. It was later owned by the Southern Pacific Railroad, which abandoned the line past Leon Springs. After that, the line past 1604 became known as the Camp Stanley Industrial Lead because the line went just far enough out to serve the warehouses at Camp Stanley.

Four locomotives are operated by the AGCR: #1 EMD SD40 (former MP 777), #2 EMD SD40-2, #3 SD40-2 converted into a yard slug (former CNW 6819), #4 EMD SW1500
