= Houston Belt and Terminal Railway Company =

Terminal railway in Houston, Texas, United States

Houston Belt and Terminal Railway
Overview
- Parent company: Union Pacific and BNSF Railway
- Headquarters: 501 Crawford Street, Room 100, Houston, TX 77002-2113
- Dates of operation: 1905–

Technical
- Track gauge: 1,435 mm (4 ft 8 1/2 in)

Houston Belt & Terminal Railway Company (HBT) is a terminal and switching railroad and owner of industrial property in Houston, Texas, United States that also formerly operated Houston's Union Station. It was incorporated on August 31, 1905. Construction began that year, and the HB&T was initially owned by four line-haul railway companies that it connected with: the Trinity and Brazos Valley Railway Company, the Beaumont, Sour Lake and Western Railway Company, the St. Louis, Brownsville and Mexico Railway Company and the Gulf, Colorado and Santa Fe Railway Company. The railroad opened for operations in 1908.

In 1909, the HB&T commissioned the construction and design of Houston Union Station. The station was jointly shared by the Burlington-Rock Island, Missouri Pacific, Gulf, Colorado and Santa Fe, and the HB&T. Like most railroad stations in the south, Houston Union Station was built with segregated waiting rooms.

By mid 1916, the HB&T operated 23 miles of mainline track and 61 miles of track in total, serving as a vital railroad link within Houston. The HB&T operated two subdivisions: the West Belt Subdivision and the East Belt Subdivision.

As a result of mergers and consolidations in the railway industry, the company's shareholders changed. As of 2024, BNSF Railway and Union Pacific Railroad each owned 50% of the company's shares. As of 2023, the company is still covered by the Railroad Retirement Act.

The company's archives from 1905 to 1936 are held by History Colorado.

A dispute among railways involving the HB&T was decided by the United States Supreme Court.
