= Galveston Railroad =

Texas railroad

Overview
- Headquarters: Galveston, Texas
- Reporting mark: GVSR
- Locale: Galveston, Texas
- Dates of operation: 1900–present
- Predecessor: Galveston Wharves Railway

Technical
- Track gauge: 4 ft 8 1/2 in (1,435 mm)
- Length: 3 miles (4.8 km)

Other
- Website: Official website

The Galveston Railroad (reporting mark GVSR) is a Class III terminal switching railroad headquartered in Galveston, Texas. It primarily serves the transportation of cargo to and from the Port of Galveston.

GVSR operates 3 miles (4.8 km) of yard track at Galveston, over a 50-acre (200,000 m^{2}) facility.

The railroad was formed in 1900 as the Galveston Wharves Railway. It is owned by the City of Galveston, and GVSR took over operations in 1987.

On May 26, 2005, Genesee & Wyoming (G&W) announced that it has agreed to purchase the railroad operations of Rail Management Corporation (RMC), the parent company of Galveston Railroad. G&W paid $243 million in cash and assumed $1.7 million in company debt to gain control of 14 short line railroads from RMC across the southeastern United States, as of June 1, 2005.
