= Switching and terminal railroad =

Type of freight railroad company

A switching and terminal railroad is a freight railroad company whose primary purpose is to perform local switching services or to own and operate a terminal facility.

Switching is a type of operation done within the limits of a yard. It generally consists of making up and breaking up trains, storing and classifying cars, serving industries within yard limits, and other related purposes. Those movements are made at slow speed under special yard rules.

A terminal facility may include a union freight station, train ferry, car float, or bridge. Its purpose is to connect larger carriers to other modes of transport or other carriers.

Those companies may be jointly owned by several major carriers, as are the Kansas City Terminal Railway, Belt Railway of Chicago, Terminal Railroad Association of St. Louis, Galveston Railroad, and Conrail Shared Assets Operations.

The Internal Revenue Service provides tax incentives for this type of company, which may also be created when a larger railroad abandons an unprofitable line, and a shortline railroad later takes over operations to connect shippers to the larger company.
