= West Texas and Lubbock Railway =

West Texas & Lubbock Railway

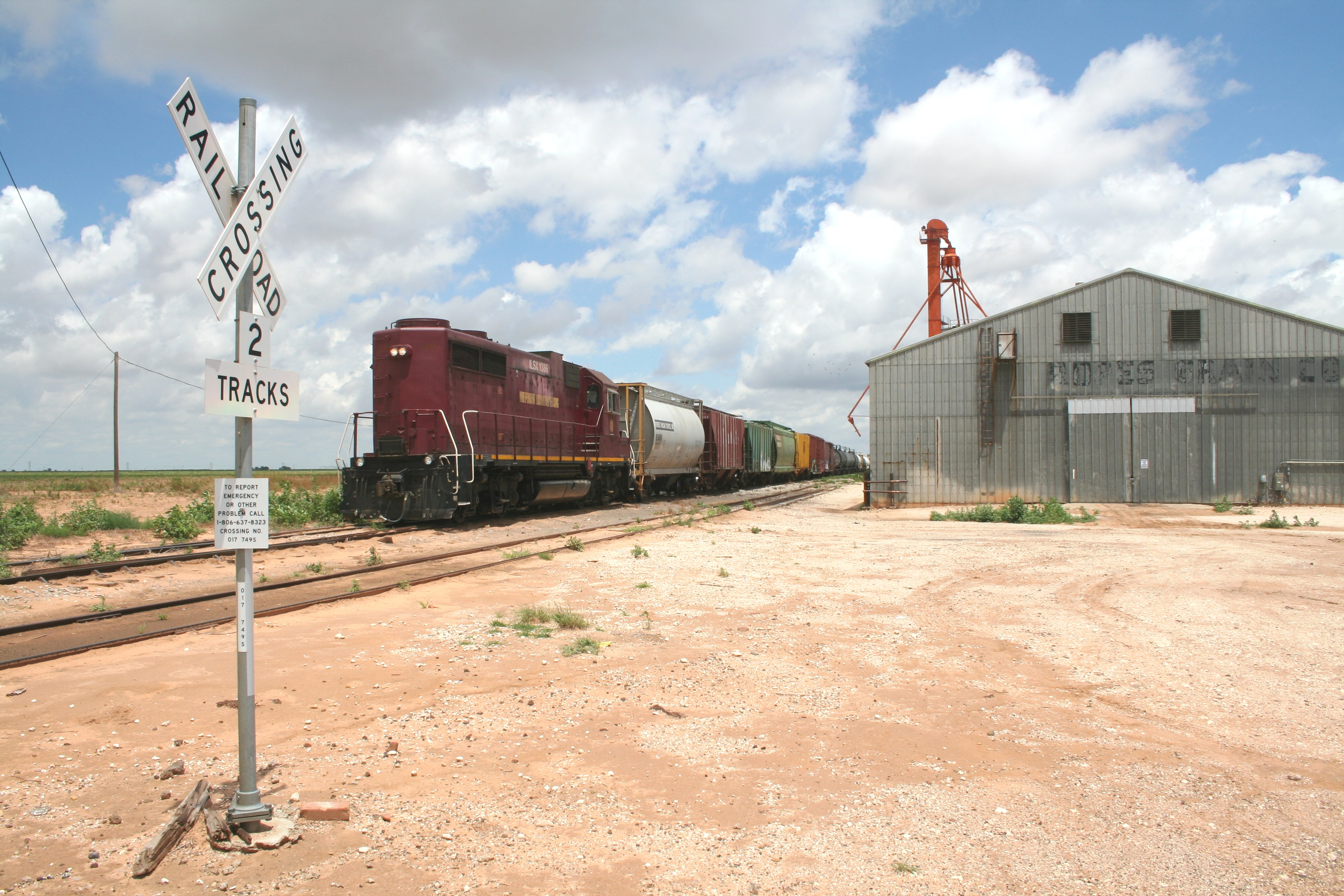
- WT&L freight train near Ropesville

Overview
- Headquarters: Brownfield, Texas
- Reporting mark: WTLC
- Locale: West Texas
- Dates of operation: 2002–

Technical
- Track gauge: 4 ft 8 1/2 in (1,435 mm) standard gauge

The West Texas & Lubbock Railway (reporting mark WTLC) is a shortline railroad in Texas, owned by Watco. It connects the BNSF in Lubbock with agricultural and oil-producing areas to the west and southwest. The company operates 107 miles of two ex-Atchison, Topeka & Santa Fe Railway lines, extending to Whiteface and Seagraves parallel to State Highway 114 and U.S. Highway 62. The primary commodities hauled are fertilizer, construction aggregates, grain, cotton, chemicals, peanuts and plastics.

== History ==
The origin of the two lines that make up today’s WTLC is the Crosbyton-Southplains Railroad Company (CSRC) which was chartered in 1910 to build a line from Lubbock to Crosbyton. In 1915, the CSRC was purchased by the Atchison, Topeka & Santa Fe Railway (ATSF) which changed its name to the South Plains and Santa Fe Railway. The ATSF system, opened by the South Plains and Santa Fe Railway to Seagraves in 1918 and to Bledsoe in 1925 (later cut back to Whiteface). The Santa Fe sold the two lines to the Seagraves, Whiteface and Lubbock Railroad (reporting mark SWGR) in April 1990, and in November 1995 RailAmerica took over operations through the West Texas and Lubbock Railroad (reporting mark WTLR), which also operated the affiliated Plainview Terminal Company. Iowa Pacific organized the West Texas and Lubbock Railway, which began operating the West Texas and Lubbock Railroad under lease in 2002. In 2004 Iowa Pacific bought from RailAmerica the old WT&L, which still exists as a non-operating subsidiary. The new WT&L expanded its operations in January 2006 when it began providing emergency alternative rail service to two plants of PYCO Industries in Lubbock, since that operated by South Plains Switching was inadequate. PYCO acquired the line in November 2007 as a feeder line, and the WT&L continues to operate over it. Also in 2007, the WT&L bought the BNSF line between Plainview and Dimmitt, which Chicago, Burlington & Quincy Railroad subsidiary Fort Worth & Denver South Plains Railway had completed in 1928.

In May 2015, Watco purchased the WT&L from Iowa Pacific, with the railroad planned to be renamed the Lubbock and Western Railway.

=== Cities Served ===
- Lubbock, TX
- Doud, TX
- Wollforth, TX
- Ropesville, TX
- Meadow, TX
- Brownfield, TX
- Wellman, TX
- Seagraves, TX
- Hurlwood, TX
- Smyer, TX
- Levelland, TX
- Whiteface, TX
- Wright
- Edmonson
- Grisham
- Hilburn
- Hart
- Roy
- Dimmitt

=== Locomotives Operated ===
- One EMD SD9043MAC
- Three EMD GP38s
- Two EMD F40 mother-mate sets
- One EMD GP20

=== Commodities Transported ===
- Chemicals
- Cotton
- Grain
- Farm Machinery
- Lumber
- Oilfield Supplies
- Peanuts
- Plastic
- Rock
- Fertilizer
- Animal/Poultry feedstock
