= Texas and St. Louis Railway =

Overview
- Headquarters: Tyler, Texas
- Locale: Texas, Arkansas & Missouri
- Dates of operation: 1871–1886

Technical
- Track gauge: 3 ft (914 mm) gauge
- Length: 725 miles (1,167 km)

Originally incorporated as the Tyler Tap Railroad in 1871, the Texas and St. Louis Railway (T&SL) constructed a three-foot-gauge railroad from Gatesville, Texas, through Arkansas to Bird's Point, Missouri, starting in 1875 and completing by 1883. One of the two longest narrow-gauge lines in the country, the railroad went into receivership in early 1884, and another railway had acquired its trackage by 1886.

== History ==
=== Tyler Tap Railroad ===
The citizens of Tyler, Texas, became concerned that their town was being bypassed by other railroads, so they decided to finance and construct their own connection to tap into the national rail grid. The original charter of the Tyler Tap Railroad, enacted by a special act of the 12th Texas Legislature on December 1, 1871, provided merely for “…a single or double track, from Tyler to such a point, not exceeding forty miles from the above town on either the Southern Pacific, Houston and Great Northern or the International Railroad, as may be selected by the directors." However, on May 7, 1873, the charter was amended to provide for the line to "...run north from Tyler by way of Gilmer, Pittsburg, Mt. Pleasant, and Clarksville to some point on the Red River.” This increased the length of the projected route to about 127 miles. Money was tight from the beginning, and the decision was made to build the railroad in three-foot narrow gauge as a cost-saving measure. Construction began in the summer of 1875, and the first 21 miles, from Tyler to Big Sandy, were completed in early October 1877. There, it met the tracks of the Texas and Pacific Railway. Ironically, Tyler had already gotten its desired rail connection by this time, because the International–Great Northern Railroad had built into town in 1874. Perhaps as a consequence, the Tyler Tap was not as financially successful as had been hoped.

=== New financing and name ===
The backers of the Tyler Tap were able to interest St. Louis capitalist James W. Paramore—president of the St. Louis Cotton Compress Company—and his associates in the railroad, because they believed the line might result in lower shipping rates for cotton shipments from Texas to their compressors in St. Louis. Paramore reincorporated the line, changing the name from the Tyler Tap to the Texas and St. Louis Railway on May 14, 1879, and obtaining authority to continue his projected route east to the Texas state line near Texarkana and also west from Tyler to Waco. The reenergized T&SL built 107 miles of track between Big Sandy and Texarkana by July 12, 1880, completed another 37 miles between Tyler and Athens by the end of that year, and reached Waco on September 11, 1881. The following year, the company laid even more track, running an additional 46 miles west from Waco to Gatesville. This gave the line 305 miles of main track.

A new problem developed, though; Paramore had intended to interface with the St. Louis, Iron Mountain and Southern Railway ("Iron Mountain") at Texarkana, but that line had come under the control of "robber baron" Jay Gould, who refused a connection on reasonable terms, apparently trying to force the T&SL into a sale or unfavorable arrangement. Undeterred, Paramore decided to extend his line through Arkansas to Bird's Point, Missouri, where railroads could access a ferry over the Mississippi River to Cairo, Illinois, and from there connect with other railroads. Construction was carried out over 1882-1883, with the final ceremonial silver spike driven August 12, 1883, on a new bridge over the Arkansas River. The result was a 725-mile continuous rail network between Gatesville and Bird's Point, being the second-longest narrow-gauge railway system in the country, exceeded only by the Denver and Rio Grande Western Railroad.

=== Grand Narrow Gauge Trunk ===
The T&SL was a promoter of the Grand Narrow Gauge Trunk. If all required elements had fallen into place, this would have created continuous 3 ft (914 mm) narrow-gauge tracks extending from Mexico City to the Great Lakes. The T&SL already planned to extend southerly to Laredo, Texas, where not much more than a bridge or ferry would have been necessary to have joined it to the narrow-gauge rails of the National Railroad of Mexico, which ran south from Nuevo Laredo, Mexico to Mexico City. Then, a new railroad would have been needed to fill the gap between the end of T&SL's line in the north and a connection around St. Louis to the narrow-gauge Toledo, Cincinnati & St. Louis Railroad, which true to its name ran from East St. Louis to Toledo, Ohio, on Lake Erie. Representatives of the T&SL and the Toledo, Cincinnati & St. Louis announced in January 1881 their agreement to form such a linking railroad, to be called the Toledo, Texas and Rio Grande. While a company of that name was chartered in Illinois on June 8, 1882, financial issues with both sponsor railroads, starting around the fall of 1882, quickly prevented any real progress on the plan.

While the failure of the Grand Narrow Gauge Trunk and its sponsors did not by itself doom the narrow-gauge railroad movement in the U.S., this occurrence was seen as solid evidence that narrow-gauge lines were not competitive with standard railroads for general transport purposes, although they might still have uses in niche applications.

=== Receivership and sale ===
The T&SL ran into various forms of trouble, ranging from lack of adequate equipment, heavy rains in the fall of 1883, and eventually a train crew strike in November 1883, when the railroad could not timely pay employees. The railroad went into receivership in early 1884. After foreclosure, its assets were technically conveyed to two different companies, with the Texas portion going to the St. Louis, Arkansas and Texas Railway Company in Texas on February 11, 1886, and the Arkansas and Missouri portions going to the St. Louis, Arkansas and Texas Railway Company in Arkansas and Missouri on April 29, 1886; however, only one management existed for the new St. Louis, Arkansas and Texas Railway. That line began quickly converting to standard-gauge on October 18, 1886. In early 1891, the assets of both companies, obtained in foreclosure, were conveyed to and constituted the core of the newly formed St. Louis Southwestern Railway, commonly known as the Cotton Belt.

=== Effects and legacy ===
Where the line of the T&SL, controlled by Paramore, crossed the line of the Iron Mountain, controlled by Jay Gould, the people of the town formed at that location wanted to use for its name Paragould. Gould was not happy about receiving second billing, though, and originally refused to use that name in his train schedules, instead using Parmley, but later acquiescing to Para-Gould. The city name, nonetheless, evolved over time to Paragould, which remains today.

The importance of the T&SL to the land it crossed was demonstrated by the fact that mere notice the railway was coming through the town of Brinkley, Arkansas, was enough for the owners of the Cotton Plant Railroad, which originated in Brinkley, to convert to the T&SL's three-foot gauge to be compatible. The Arkansas Midland Railroad converted from its 3 ft, 6 in gauge to three-foot gauge in 1883 to achieve gauge compatibility with the T&SL where the two lines interchanged at Clarendon. When the successors of the T&SL converted to standard gauge, the owners of the Cotton Plant, by then 56 miles long and known as the Batesville and Brinkley (and later as the White and Black River Valley Railway), converted to standard gauge, as well. The Arkansas Midland likewise converted to standard gauge a year after the T&SL did.
