= List of Oklahoma railroads =

The following railroads operate in the U.S. state of Oklahoma.

== Common freight carriers ==
- Arkansas–Oklahoma Railroad (AOK)
- Arkansas Southern Railroad (ARS)
- AT&L Railroad (ATLT)
- BNSF Railway (BNSF)
- Canadian Pacific Kansas City (CPKC)
- Cimarron Valley Railroad (CVR)
- Farmrail Corporation (FMRC)
- Gateway Eastern Railway (GWER)
- Grainbelt Corporation (GNBC)
- Kiamichi Railroad (KRR)
- Land Rush Rail Corporation (LRRC)
- Northwestern Oklahoma Railroad (NOKL)
- Port of Muskogee Railroad (PMR)
- Sand Springs Railway (SS)
- South Kansas and Oklahoma Railroad (SKOL)
- Stillwater Central Railroad (SLWC)
- Texas, Oklahoma and Eastern Railroad (TOE)
- Port of Catoosa Industrial Railroad (PCIR)
- Tulsa–Sapulpa Union Railway (TSU)
- Union Pacific Railroad (UP)
- WFEC Railroad Company (WFEC)
- Verdigris Southern Railroad (VESO)
- Wichita, Tillman and Jackson Railway (WTJR)

== Passenger carriers ==
- Amtrak (AMTK)
- Oklahoma City Streetcar
- El Reno Heritage Express

== Defunct railroads ==
Name	Mark	System (Note: This is one or more of the Class I railroads that the railroad became part of, if any.)	From	To	Successor	Notes
Ada Terminal Railway		ATSF	1909	1914	Oklahoma Central Railroad	
Altus, Wichita Falls and Hollis Railway		MKT	1910	1911	Wichita Falls and Northwestern Railway	
Arkansas and Choctaw Railway		SLSF	1895	1902	name change to St. Louis, San Francisco and New Orleans Railroad	
Arkansas and Oklahoma Railroad		SLSF	1898	1901	St. Louis and San Francisco Railroad	
Arkansas Valley and Western Railway		SLSF	1902	1907	St. Louis and San Francisco Railroad	
Arkansas Western Railroad		KCS	1899	1904	Arkansas Western Railway	
Arkansas Western Railway	ARW	KCS	1904	1992	Kansas City Southern Railway	
Atchison, Topeka and Santa Fe Railroad		ATSF	1888	1895	Atchison, Topeka and Santa Fe Railway	
Atchison, Topeka and Santa Fe Railway	ATSF	ATSF	1895	1996	Burlington Northern and Santa Fe Railway	
Atlantic and Pacific Railroad		SLSF	1866	1897	St. Louis and San Francisco Railroad	
Beaver, Meade and Englewood Railroad	BME	MKT	1912	1972	N/A	
Blackwell, Enid and Southwestern Railway	BES	SLSF	1900	1907	St. Louis and San Francisco Railroad	
Blackwell and Northern Railway	BNR		2000	2006	Blackwell Northern Gateway Railroad	
Blackwell and Southern Railway		ATSF	1899	1900	Atchison, Topeka and Santa Fe Railway	
Blackwell Northern Gateway Railroad	BNG		2006	2024	Oklahoma and Kansas Railroad	
Buffalo and Northwestern Railroad		ATSF	1919	1920	Atchison, Topeka and Santa Fe Railway	
Buffalo and Northwestern Railway		ATSF	1916	1919	Buffalo and Northwestern Railroad	
Burlington Northern Inc.	BN		1980	1981	Burlington Northern Railroad	
Burlington Northern Railroad	BN		1981	1996	Burlington Northern and Santa Fe Railway	
Canadian Valley and Western Railway		ATSF	1904	1905	Oklahoma Central Railway	
Cheyenne Railroad		ATSF	1916	1920	Clinton and Oklahoma Western Railroad	
Cheyenne Short Line Railroad		ATSF	1912	1916	Cheyenne Railroad	
Chicago, Kansas and Nebraska Railway		RI	1887	1891	Chicago, Rock Island and Pacific Railway	
Chicago, Rock Island and Pacific Railroad	RI, ROCK	RI	1947	1980	Enid Central Railway, Farmrail Corporation, Missouri–Kansas–Texas Railroad, North Central Oklahoma Railway, Oklahoma, Kansas and Texas Railroad, St. Louis Southwestern Railway, Texas North Western Railway	
Chicago, Rock Island and Pacific Railway	RI	RI	1891	1948	Chicago, Rock Island and Pacific Railroad	
Chickasha Terminal Railway		ATSF	1910	1914	Oklahoma Central Railroad	
Choctaw Coal and Railway Company		RI	1888	1894	Choctaw, Oklahoma and Gulf Railroad	
Choctaw, Newcastle and Western Railroad			1907	1919/21	N/A	
Choctaw Northern Railroad		RI	1901	1902	Choctaw, Oklahoma and Gulf Railroad	
Choctaw, Oklahoma and Gulf Railroad		RI	1894	1948	Chicago, Rock Island and Pacific Railroad	
Choctaw, Oklahoma and Western Railroad		RI	1902	1904	Chicago, Rock Island and Pacific Railway	
Cimarron River Valley Railway	CRVC		1985	1989	N/A	
Clinton and Oklahoma Western Railway		ATSF	1908	1920	Clinton and Oklahoma Western Railroad	
Clinton and Oklahoma Western Railroad		ATSF	1920	1948	Panhandle and Santa Fe Railway	
Cushing Traction Company		ATSF	1914	1915	Oil Fields and Santa Fe Railway	
Denison and Washita Valley Railway		MKT	1886	1903	Missouri, Kansas and Texas Railway, Texas and Oklahoma Railroad	
Denver, Enid and Gulf Railroad		ATSF	1902	1907	Eastern Oklahoma Railway	
Eastern Oklahoma Railway		ATSF	1899	1907	Atchison, Topeka and Santa Fe Railway	
Enid and Anadarko Railway		RI	1901	1903	Chicago, Rock Island and Pacific Railway	
Enid Central Railway	ENIC		1982	1983	Oklahoma, Kansas and Texas Railroad	
Enid and Tonkawa Railway		RI	1899	1899	Chicago, Rock Island and Pacific Railway	
Fort Smith, Poteau and Western Railroad			1915	1919	Poteau and Cavanal Mountain Railroad	
Fort Smith, Poteau and Western Railway			1899	1915	Fort Smith, Poteau and Western Railroad	
Fort Smith and Van Buren Railway	FSVB	KCS	1939	1992	Kansas City Southern Railway	
Fort Smith and Western Railroad	FS&W		1899	1923	Fort Smith and Western Railway	
Fort Smith and Western Railroad of Oklahoma			1902	1907	Fort Smith and Western Railroad	
Fort Smith and Western Railway	FS&W, FSW		1921	1939	Fort Smith and Van Buren Railway	
Gulf Railroad		ATSF	1896	1899	Hutchinson and Southern Railway	
Gulf, Colorado and Santa Fe Railway		ATSF	1884	1965	Atchison, Topeka and Santa Fe Railway	
Guthrie and Kingfisher Railway		RI	1899	1900	Chicago, Rock Island and Pacific Railway	
Guthrie and Western Railway		ATSF	1900	1902	Eastern Oklahoma Railway	
Healdton and Santa Fe Railway		ATSF	1925	1948	Atchison, Topeka and Santa Fe Railway	
Hutchinson and Southern Railroad		ATSF	1889	1898	Hutchinson and Southern Railway	
Hutchinson and Southern Railway		ATSF	1897	1899	Atchison, Topeka and Santa Fe Railway	
Kansas and Arkansas Valley Railway		MP	1888	1909	St. Louis, Iron Mountain and Southern Railway	
Kansas and Southeastern Railroad		ATSF	1897	1899	Atchison, Topeka and Santa Fe Railway	
Kansas City, Fort Scott and Memphis Railroad		SLSF	1896	1901	Kansas City, Fort Scott and Memphis Railway	
Kansas City, Fort Scott and Memphis Railway		SLSF	1901	1928	St. Louis – San Francisco Railway	
Kansas City, Mexico and Orient Railroad		ATSF	1914	1925	Kansas City, Mexico and Orient Railway	
Kansas City, Mexico and Orient Railway		ATSF	1925	1941	Atchison, Topeka and Santa Fe Railway	
Kansas City, Mexico and Orient Railway		ATSF	1900	1914	Kansas City, Mexico and Orient Railroad	
Kansas City and Pacific Railroad		MKT	1886	1899	Missouri, Kansas and Texas Railway	
Kansas City, Pittsburg and Gulf Railroad		KCS	1893	1900	Kansas City Southern Railway	
Kansas, Oklahoma and Gulf Railway	KOG	MP	1919	1970	Texas and Pacific Railway	
Kansas, Oklahoma and Gulf Railway		SLSF	1897	1899	St. Louis and San Francisco Railroad	
Kansas, Oklahoma Central and Southwestern Railway		ATSF	1893	1900	Atchison, Topeka and Santa Fe Railway	
Kingston and Choctaw Valley Railroad			1898	1901		
Kiowa, Chickasha and Fort Smith Railway		ATSF	1899	1904	Eastern Oklahoma Railway	
Lawton, Wichita Falls and Northwestern Railway						
Miami Mineral Belt Railroad		SLSF	1917	1950	St. Louis – San Francisco Railway	
Midland Valley Railroad	MV	MP	1903	1967	Texas and Pacific Railway	
Missouri, Kansas and Oklahoma Railroad		MKT	1901	1904	Missouri, Kansas and Texas Railway	
Missouri–Kansas–Texas Railroad	MKT	MKT	1923	1989	Missouri Pacific Railroad	
Missouri, Kansas and Texas Railroad		MKT	1870	1870	Missouri, Kansas and Texas Railway	
Missouri, Kansas and Texas Railway	MK&T	MKT	1870	1923	Missouri–Kansas–Texas Railroad	
Missouri, Oklahoma and Gulf Railroad		MP	1910	1919	Kansas, Oklahoma and Gulf Railway	
Missouri, Oklahoma and Gulf Railway		MP	1904	1919	Kansas, Oklahoma and Gulf Railway	
Missouri Pacific Railroad	MP	MP	1917	1997	Union Pacific Railroad	
Muskogee Southern Railroad		MP	1902	1904	Midland Valley Railroad	
Muskogee Bridge Company		MP	1903	1904	Kansas, Oklahoma and Gulf Railway	
Muskogee City Bridge Company		SLSF	1901	1903	Ozark and Cherokee Central Railway	
Muskogee Union Railway		MP	1903	1904	Kansas, Oklahoma and Gulf Railway	
North Central Oklahoma Railway	NCOK		1982	1985	AT&L Railroad	
North Texas and Santa Fe Railway		ATSF	1916	1948	Atchison, Topeka and Santa Fe Railway	
Northeast Oklahoma Railroad	NEO	SLSF	1919	1967	St. Louis – San Francisco Railway	
Oil Fields and Santa Fe Railway		ATSF	1915	1941	Atchison, Topeka and Santa Fe Railway	
Oil Fields Short Line Railroad			1916	1923	N/A	
Oil Belt Terminal Railway		ATSF	1914	1915	Oil Fields and Santa Fe Railway	
Oklahoma and Kansas Railroad		Rock Island Rail	2024	2024	Land Rush Rail Corporation	
Okarche Central Railway	OCRI		1982	1982	Oklahoma, Kansas and Texas Railroad	
Oklahoma Belt Railroad			1917	1944	N/A	
Oklahoma Central Railroad	OCR		1987	1988	N/A	
Oklahoma Central Railroad		ATSF	1914	1942	Atchison, Topeka and Santa Fe Railway	
Oklahoma Central Railway		ATSF	1905	1914	Oklahoma Central Railroad	
Oklahoma City – Ada – Atoka Railway		ATSF	1923	1967	Atchison, Topeka and Santa Fe Railway	
Oklahoma City and Western Railroad		SLSF	1901	1907	St. Louis-San Francisco Railway	
Oklahoma City Junction Railway		ATSF	1909			Still exists as a nonoperating subsidiary of the BNSF Railway
Oklahoma City Terminal Railroad		SLSF	1900	1901	St. Louis and San Francisco Railroad	
Oklahoma, Kansas and Texas Railroad	OKKT	MKT	1980	1989	Missouri–Kansas–Texas Railroad	
Oklahoma, Kansas and Missouri Railway		SLSF	1917	1919	Northeast Oklahoma Railroad	
Oklahoma, Kansas and Missouri Inter-Urban Railway		SLSF	1908	1917	Oklahoma, Kansas and Missouri Railway	
Oklahoma, New Mexico and Pacific Railway	ON&P	ATSF	1913	1926	Healdton and Santa Fe Railway	
Oklahoma & Rich Mountain Railroad			1926	1942	N/A	
Oklahoma-Southwestern Railway			1920	1930	N/A	
Oklahoma Union Railway		MP	1911	1912	Missouri, Oklahoma and Gulf Railroad	
Okmulgee Northern Railway		SLSF	1915	1964	St. Louis – San Francisco Railway	
Osage Railroad	ORR		1990	2000	Discussed on the Osage Railway page	
Osage Railway (one of the Muskogee Roads)			1921	1953	N/A	
Ozark and Cherokee Central Railway		SLSF	1903	1907	St. Louis and San Francisco Railroad	
Panhandle and Santa Fe Railway		ATSF	1920	1965	Atchison, Topeka and Santa Fe Railway	
Poteau and Cavanal Mountain Railroad			1923	1931	N/A (Owned trackage but never actually operated)	
Poteau Valley Railroad		KCS	1900	1926	N/A	
Ringling and Oil Fields Railway		ATSF	1916	1926	Healdton and Santa Fe Railway	
St. Louis, El Reno and Western Railway	SE&W		1903	1923	N/A	
St. Louis, Iron Mountain and Southern Railway		MP	1886	1917	Missouri Pacific Railroad	
St. Louis and Oklahoma City Railroad		SLSF	1895	1899	St. Louis and San Francisco Railroad	
St. Louis, Oklahoma and Southern Railway		SLSF	1895	1901	St. Louis and San Francisco Railroad	
St. Louis – San Francisco Railway	SLSF	SLSF	1916	1980	Burlington Northern Inc.	
St. Louis and San Francisco Railroad		SLSF	1896	1915	St. Louis – San Francisco Railway	
St. Louis and San Francisco Railway		SLSF	1876	1896	St. Louis and San Francisco Railroad	
St. Louis, San Francisco and New Orleans Railroad		SLSF	1902	1907	St. Louis and San Francisco Railroad	
St. Louis Southwestern Railway	SSW	SP	1980	1997	Union Pacific Railroad	
Sapulpa and Oil Field Railroad		SLSF	1915	1917	St. Louis and San Francisco Railroad	
Shawnee, Oklahoma and Missouri Coal and Railway		SLSF	1899	1903	Ozark and Cherokee Central Railway	
Southeast Kansas Railroad	SEKR		1994	1999	South Kansas and Oklahoma Railroad	
Southern Kansas Railway		ATSF	1884	1899	Atchison, Topeka and Santa Fe Railway	
Southwestern Railroad	SW		1990	2007	Abandoned its route west out of Shattuck, Oklahoma	
Sulphur Springs Railway		SLSF	1902	1907	St. Louis and San Francisco Railroad	
Tecumseh Railway		RI	1896	1900	Choctaw, Oklahoma and Gulf Railroad	
Texas North Western Railway	TXNW		1982	1987	Railroad still exists but no longer extends into Oklahoma	
Texas and Oklahoma Railroad (1991)	TXOR		1991	1993	Farmrail Corporation	
Texas and Oklahoma Railroad (1902)		MKT	1902	1903	Missouri, Kansas and Oklahoma Railroad	
Texas and Pacific Railway	T&P, TP	MP	1967	1976	Missouri Pacific Railroad	
Watonga and Northwestern Railroad		RI	1900	1901	Choctaw Northern Railroad	
Webber Falls, Shawnee and Western Railroad			1911	1914	Webbers Falls Railroad	
Webbers Falls Railroad	WFRR		1916	1918	N/A	
West Tulsa Belt Railway		SLSF	1909	1922	St. Louis – San Francisco Railway	
Western Oklahoma Railroad		RI	1900	1902	Choctaw, Oklahoma and Gulf Railroad	
Wichita Falls and Northwestern Railway	WF&N	MKT	1906	1923	Missouri–Kansas–Texas Railroad	

Electric

- Ardmore Traction Company
- Bartlesville Interurban Railway
- Chickasha Street Railway
- Choctaw Railway & Lighting Co.
- Choctaw Electric Company
- Clinton Street Railway
- El Reno Interurban Company
- Enid City Railway
- Guthrie Railway
- Indian Territory Traction Co.
- Lawton Railway and Light
- Muskogee Electric Traction Company
- Northeast Oklahoma Railroad (NEO)
- Oklahoma Railway (OK)
- Oklahoma City Railway
- Oklahoma City and Suburban Railway
- Oklahoma Traction Company
- Oklahoma Union Railway
- People's Electric Railway
- Pittsburg County Railway
- Sand Springs Railway
- Sand Springs Interurban Railway
- Southwest Missouri Railroad Company
- Sapulpa & Interurban Railway
- Sapulpa Union Railway
- Shawnee–Tecumseh Traction Company
- Shawnee Traction Company
- Tulsa Street Railway
