= List of predecessors of the St. Louis–San Francisco Railway =

The following railroad companies became part of the St. Louis–San Francisco Railway (Frisco) system, usually through consolidation.

== Early lines in Missouri and Kansas ==
The Frisco started out as the Southwest Branch (heading west-southwesterly from St. Louis) of the Pacific (later Missouri Pacific) Railroad, and was split out in 1866. That same year, Congress incorporated the Atlantic and Pacific Railroad, which would end up extending the line through Springfield and Tulsa to Sapulpa.

Name	Incorporation	Began operations	Succession	Notes
St. Louis–San Francisco Railway (Frisco of 1916)	1916	1916	1980 (to Burlington Northern Railroad)	
St. Louis and San Francisco Railroad (Frisco of 1896)	1896	1896	1916 (to Frisco of 1916)	
St. Louis and San Francisco Railway (Frisco of 1876)	1876	1876	1896 (to Frisco of 1896)	
Atlantic and Pacific Railroad	1866	1870	1876 (in Missouri, to Frisco of 1876); 1897 (in Oklahoma, to Frisco of 1896); 1897 (in New Mexico, Arizona, and California, to Santa Fe Pacific Railroad)	
South Pacific Railroad	1868	1868	1870 (to Atlantic and Pacific)	
Southwest Pacific Railroad	1866	1866	1868 (to South Pacific)	
Pacific Railroad	1849	1852	1866 (Southwest Branch, authorized 1852, to Southwest Pacific); 1876 (main line, to Missouri Pacific Railway)	
St. Louis, Salem and Arkansas Railway	1887	1887	1897 (to Frisco of 1896)	Cuba (on the main line) to Salem with branches
St. Louis, Salem and Little Rock Railroad	1871	1873	1887 (to St. Louis, Salem and Arkansas)	
Sligo Furnace Railroad	1880	1881	1881 (to St. Louis, Salem and Little Rock)	
Dent and Phelps Railroad	1877	1878	1881 (to St. Louis, Salem and Little Rock)	
Crawford County Midland Railroad	1904	1905	1905 (to Frisco of 1896)	Branch of the line to Salem
Springfield Connecting Railway	1886	1887	1926 (to Frisco of 1916)	
Springfield and Southern Railway	1882	1883	1885 (to Frisco of 1876)	Springfield to Chadwick
Springfield and Northern Railway	1884	1884	1885 (to Frisco of 1876)	Springfield to Bolivar
Kansas City, Osceola and Southern Railway	1891	1891	1900 (to Frisco of 1896)	Bolivar to Kansas City
Kansas City and Southern Railway	1880	1885	1891 (to Kansas City, Osceola and Southern)	
Kansas City, Memphis and Mobile Railroad	1871	N/A	1880 (to Kansas City and Southern)	
Missouri and Western Railway	1875	1875	1879 (to Frisco of 1876)	Pierce City (on the main line) to Oswego, with a branch to Joplin
Pierce City and Kansas Railroad	1875	N/A	1875 (to Missouri and Western)	
Oswego and State Line Railroad	1875	N/A	1875 (to Missouri and Western)	
Memphis, Carthage and Northwestern Railroad	1871	1872	1877 (to Missouri and Western)	
State Line, Oswego and Southern Kansas Railway	1872	N/A	1872 (to Memphis, Carthage and Northwestern)	
St. Louis, Wichita and Western Railway	1879	1879	1882 (to Frisco of 1876)	Oswego to Wichita
Kansas Midland Railroad	1900	1900	1900 (to Frisco of 1896)	Wichita to Ellsworth
Kansas Midland Railway	1886	1888	1900 (to Kansas Midland Railroad)	
Joplin Railway	1882	1882	1882 (to Frisco of 1876)	Girard to Galena via Joplin
Joplin and Galena Railway	1880	1881	1882 (to Joplin Railway)	
Joplin Railroad	1874	1877	1882 (to Joplin Railway)	
Pittsburg and Columbus Railway	1886	1887	1926 (to Frisco of 1916)	Pittsburg to Weir
West Tulsa Belt Railway	1909	1910	1922 (to Frisco of 1916)	

== St. Louis, Memphis and Southeastern Railroad ==
Name	Incorporation	Began operations	Succession	Notes
St. Louis, Memphis and Southeastern Railroad	1902	1902	1907 (to Frisco of 1896)	St. Louis to Luxora and Hoxie with many branches
Crystal Railway	1880	1881	1902 (to St. Louis, Memphis and Southeastern)	Branch from St. Louis, Iron Mountain and Southern Railway to Crystal City; later formed part of the main line of the St. Louis, Memphis and Southeastern
Crystal City Railway	1878	1879	1881 (to Crystal Railway)	
Cape Girardeau and Northern Railroad	1901	N/A	1902 (to St. Louis, Memphis and Southeastern)	St. Louis to Cape Girardeau (completed by the St. Louis, Memphis and Southeastern)
St. Louis and Memphis Railway	1901	1901	1902 (to St. Louis, Memphis and Southeastern)	Cape Girardeau to Luxora (completed by the St. Louis, Memphis and Southeastern)
St. Louis and Memphis Railroad	1898	1898	1901 (to St. Louis and Memphis Railway)	
Memphis and St. Louis Railroad	1899	1901	1901 (to St. Louis and Memphis Railway)	
St. Louis, Caruthersville and Memphis Railroad	1897	1901	1901 (to St. Louis and Memphis Railway)	
Southern Missouri and Arkansas Railroad	1899	1899	1902 (to St. Louis, Memphis and Southeastern)	Cape Girardeau to Hunter, with a branch to Hoxie via Poplar Bluff (completed by the St. Louis, Memphis and Southeastern)
St. Louis, Cape Girardeau and Ft. Smith Railway	1891	1891	1899 (to Southern Missouri and Arkansas)	
Cape Girardeau Southwestern Railway	1881	1882	1891 (renamed St. Louis, Cape Girardeau and Ft. Smith)	
Cape Girardeau Railway	1880	N/A	1881 (renamed Cape Girardeau Southwestern)	
Cape Girardeau and State Line Railway	1869	N/A	1880 (to Cape Girardeau Railway)	
Pilot Knob, Cape Girardeau and Belmont Railroad	1859	N/A	1869 (renamed Cape Girardeau and State Line)	
Arkansas Railroad	1901	N/A	1901 (to Southern Missouri and Arkansas)	
Hoxie, Pocahontas and Northern Railroad	1896	1896	1901 (to Southern Missouri and Arkansas)	
St. Louis and Gulf Railway	1902	1902	1904 (to St. Louis, Memphis and Southeastern)	Cape Girardeau to Caruthersville with many branches
Houck's Missouri and Arkansas Railroad	1893	1893	1902 (to St. Louis and Gulf)	Cape Girardeau to Morley via Commerce
Morley and Morehouse Railroad	1897	1898	1902 (to St. Louis and Gulf)	Morley to Morehouse
St. Louis, Morehouse and Southern Railroad	1899	1901	1904 (to St. Louis and Gulf)	Morehouse to Pascola (completed by the St. Louis and Gulf)
Pemiscot Southern Railroad	1900	1901	1902 (to St. Louis and Gulf)	Pascola to Deering
Cape Girardeau, Bloomfield and Southern Railway	1887	1891	1902 (to St. Louis and Gulf)	Zalma to Campbell via Brownwood and Bloomfield, with a branch to Vanduser (completed by the St. Louis and Gulf)
Brownwood and Northwestern Railway	1886	1887	1898 (to Cape Girardeau, Bloomfield and Southern)	
Missouri Southeastern Railway	1891	1894	1898 (to Cape Girardeau, Bloomfield and Southern)	
St. Louis, Kennett and Southern Railroad	1890	1891	1902 (to St. Louis and Gulf)	Campbell to Caruthersville
Pemiscot Railroad	1892	1894	1895 (to St. Louis, Kennett and Southern)	
Clarkton Branch St. Louis, Kennett and Southern Railroad	1901	1901	1902 (to St. Louis and Gulf)	Gibson to Tallapoosa via Clarkton; branch to Malden built by the St. Louis and Gulf
St. Francois Valley Railroad	1898	1898	1902 (to St. Louis and Gulf)	Campbell to Caligoa
Kennett and Osceola Railroad	1896	1897	1902 (to St. Louis and Gulf)	Kennett to Leachville (completed by the St. Louis and Gulf)

== Kansas City, Fort Scott and Memphis Railway ==
Name	Incorporation	Began operations	Succession	Notes
Kansas City, Fort Scott and Memphis Railway	1901	1901	1901 All track goes into operation by the Frisco (the Frisco buys off the last shares of stock in 1926)	Kansas City to West Memphis with many branches
Gulf, Arkansas and Northwestern Railway	1898	N/A	1901 (to Kansas City, Fort Scott and Memphis Railroad)	
Arkansas North Western Railway	1894	N/A	1898 (to Gulf, Arkansas and Northwestern)	
Kansas City, Fort Scott, and Gulf Railroad	1888	1888	1901 (to Kansas City, Fort Scott and Memphis Railway)	Kansas City to West Memphis with many branches
Kansas City, Fort Scott and Springfield Railroad	1888	1888	1888 (to Kansas City, Fort Scott and Memphis Railroad)	Kansas City to West Memphis with many branches
Kansas City, Fort Scott, and Gulf Railroad	1879	1879	1888 (to Kansas City, Fort Scott and Springfield)	Kansas City to Baxter Springs (later extended to Afton)
Missouri River, Fort Scott & Gulf Railroad	1868	1868	1879 (to Kansas City, Fort Scott, and Gulf Railroad)	
Kansas and Neosho Valley Railroad	1865	1868	1868 (renamed Missouri River, Fort Scott & Gulf Railroad)	
Fort Scott, South Eastern and Memphis Railway	1874	1874	1888 (to Kansas City, Fort Scott and Springfield)	Fort Scott to Arcadia
Kansas and Missouri Railroad	1882	1882	1888 (to Kansas City, Fort Scott and Springfield)	Arcadia to Weir
Cherokee and Memphis Railroad	1882	N/A	1882 (to Kansas and Missouri)	
Fort Scott and Carthage Railroad	1881	1881	1882 (to Kansas and Missouri)	
Memphis, Kansas and Colorado Railroad	1877	1881	1888 (to Kansas City, Fort Scott and Springfield)	Weir to Cherryvale
Memphis and Ellsworth Narrow Gauge Railroad	1876	N/A	1878 (to Memphis, Kansas and Colorado)	
Fort Scott, South Eastern and Memphis Railroad	1880	1880	1888 (to Kansas City, Fort Scott and Springfield)	Arcadia to Ash Grove
Springfield and Western Missouri Railroad	1877	1878	1888 (to Kansas City, Springfield and Memphis)	Ash Grove to Springfield
Springfield Western and Southern Railroad of Missouri	1875	N/A	1877 (renamed Springfield and Western Missouri)	
Kansas City and Memphis Railroad	1872	N/A	1879 (to Springfield and Western Missouri)	
Kansas City, Springfield and Memphis Railroad	1881	1883	1888 (to Kansas City, Fort Scott and Memphis Railroad)	Springfield to West Memphis
Springfield and Memphis Railroad	1880	N/A	1883 (to Kansas City, Springfield and Memphis)	
Kansas City, Clinton and Springfield Railway	1885	1885	1928 (to Frisco of 1916)	Olathe to Ash Grove, with a branch to Pleasant Hill
Kansas City, Clinton and Springfield Railroad	1884	N/A	1885 (to Kansas City, Clinton and Springfield Railway)	Raymore to Ash Grove (completed by the Kansas City, Clinton and Springfield Railway)
Pleasant Hill and De Soto Railroad	1877	1877	1885 (to Kansas City, Clinton and Springfield Railway)	Cedar to Pleasant Hill
St. Louis, Lawrence and Western Railroad	1874	1874	1877 (to Pleasant Hill and De Soto) portion to Kansas City, Topeka and Western Railroad	
St. Louis, Lawrence and Denver Railroad	1865	1871	1874 (renamed St. Louis, Lawrence and Western)	
Lawrence and Carbondale Railroad	unknown	N/A	1873 (to St. Louis, Lawrence and Denver)	
Pleasant Hill and Lawrence Branch of the Pacific Railroad	unknown	N/A	1870 (to St. Louis, Lawrence and Denver)	
Lawrence and Pleasant Hill Railway	1869	N/A	1870 (to St. Louis, Lawrence and Denver)	
Rich Hill Railroad	1880	1880	1888 (to Kansas City, Fort Scott and Springfield)	Pleasanton to Rich Hill
Short Creek and Joplin Railroad	1879	1880	1888 (to Kansas City, Fort Scott and Springfield)	Baxter Springs to Webb City via Joplin
Mineral Belt Railroad	1886	1900	1901 (to Kansas City, Fort Scott and Memphis Railway)	Joplin to Webb City
Greenfield and Northern Railroad	1886	1886	1895 (to Kansas City, Fort Scott and Memphis Railroad)	Greenfield to Aurora
Greenfield Railroad	1884	1886	1886 (renamed Greenfield and Northern)	
Current River Railroad	1887	1887	1901 (to Kansas City, Fort Scott and Memphis Railroad)	Willow Springs to Grandin
Bonnerville and Southwestern Railroad	1905	1905	1920s (to Kansas City, Fort Scott and Memphis)	Bono to Algoa
Tyronza Central Railroad	1902	1902	1920s (to Kansas City, Fort Scott and Memphis)	Tyronza to Lepanto
Deckerville, Osceola and Northern Railroad	1897	1900	1901 (to Kansas City, Fort Scott and Memphis Railroad)	Turrell to Luxora
Kansas City and Memphis Railway and Bridge Company	1887	1892	1928 (to Frisco of 1916)	
Kansas City, Memphis and Birmingham Railroad	1886	1887	1928 (to Frisco of 1916)	Memphis to Birmingham, with branches to Aberdeen, Bessemer, and Sipsey
Memphis and Birmingham Railroad	1886	N/A	1887 (to Kansas City, Memphis and Birmingham Railroad)	
Memphis and Southeastern Railroad	1886	N/A	1886 (to Kansas City, Memphis and Birmingham Railroad)	
Memphis, Birmingham and Atlantic Railroad	1885	1885	1887 (to Kansas City, Memphis and Birmingham Railroad)	
Memphis, Selma and Brunswick Railroad	1881	1885	1885 (to Memphis, Birmingham and Atlantic)	
Memphis, Holly Springs and Selma Railroad	1881	N/A	1881 (renamed Memphis, Selma and Brunswick)	
Selma, Marion and Memphis Railroad	1868	N/A	1881 (to Memphis, Holly Springs and Selma)	
Memphis, Holly Springs, Okolona and Selma Railroad	1867	N/A	1870 (renamed Selma, Marion and Memphis)	
Memphis, Holly Springs and Mobile Railroad	1859	N/A	1867 (renamed Memphis, Holly Springs, Okolona and Selma)	
Birmingham Belt Railroad	1899	1899	1968 (to Frisco of 1916)	

== Other extensions into Arkansas, Oklahoma, and Texas ==
Because of a provision of the Texas Constitution, railroad companies operating in that state had to be incorporated in Texas. The Frisco's primary Texas subsidiary was the St. Louis, San Francisco and Texas Railway (Frisco of Texas).

Name	Incorporation	Began operations	Succession	Notes
Arkansas and Choctaw Railway	1895	1895	The line came under control of a Frisco financial syndicate in 1902, and changed names to become the St. Louis, San Francisco and New Orleans Railroad the same year. The railroad property was deeded to the Frisco on November 30, 1907.	Main line from Hope, Arkansas to Ardmore, Oklahoma
St. Louis and Oklahoma City Railroad	1895	1898	1899 (to Frisco of 1896)	Sapulpa to Oklahoma City
Oklahoma City Terminal Railroad	1900	1900	1901 (to Frisco of 1896)	
Oklahoma City and Western Railroad	1899	1902	1907 (to Frisco of 1896)	Oklahoma City to state line near Quanah
Oklahoma City and Texas Railroad	1901	1903	1904 (to Frisco of Texas)	State line to Quanah
Quanah, Acme and Pacific Railway	1909	1910	1981 (to Burlington Northern Railroad)	Quanah to Floydada
Acme, Red River and Northern Railway	1902	N/A	1909 (renamed Quanah, Acme and Pacific)	
Motley County Railway	1913	1914	1926 (to Quanah, Acme and Pacific)	Branch of Quanah, Acme and Pacific to Matador
Sapulpa and Oil Field Railroad	1915	1916	1917 (to Frisco of 1896)	Depew (on the line to Quanah) to Shamrock
St. Louis, Oklahoma and Southern Railway	1895	1900	1901 (to Frisco of 1896)	Sapulpa to state line near Denison
St. Louis, San Francisco and Texas Railway	1900	1901	1964 (to Frisco of 1916)	State line to Denison (acquired other lines in 1904)
Red River, Texas and Southern Railway	1901	1902	1904 (to Frisco of Texas)	Denison to Dallas and Fort Worth
Sulphur Springs Railway	1902	1903	1907 (to Frisco of 1896)	Scullin (on the line to Dallas-Fort Worth) to Sulphur
Arkansas Valley and Western Railway	1902	1904	1907 (to Frisco of 1896)	Tulsa to Avard
St. Louis, Arkansas and Texas Railway	1880	1880	1882 (to Frisco of 1876)	Monett (on the main line) to Fort Smith; completed by the Frisco
Missouri, Arkansas and Southern Railway	1880	N/A	1881 (to St. Louis, Arkansas and Texas)	
Fort Smith and Van Buren Bridge Company	1885	1886	1907 (to Frisco of 1896)	
Fort Smith and Southern Railway	1886	1887	1887 (to Frisco of 1876)	Fort Smith to the state line near Paris; completed by the Frisco
Paris and Great Northern Railroad	1881	1888	1928 (to Frisco of Texas)	State line to Paris
Arkansas and Oklahoma Railroad	1898	1898	1901 (to Frisco of 1896)	Rogers (on the line to Fort Smith) to Grove via Bentonville
Bentonville Railroad	1882	1883	1900 (to Arkansas and Oklahoma)	
Fayetteville and Little Rock Railroad	1886	1887	1887 (Fayetteville to Patrick, to Frisco of 1876); 1926 (remainder, to Frisco of 1916)	Fayetteville (on the line to Fort Smith) to Pettigrew
Ozark and Cherokee Central Railway	1901	1903	1907 (to Frisco of 1896)	Fayetteville (on the line to Fort Smith) to Okmulgee (on the line to Dallas-Fort Worth)
North Arkansas and Western Railway	1899	N/A	1901 (renamed Ozark and Cherokee Central)	
Muskogee City Bridge Company	1901	1903	1903 (to Ozark and Cherokee Central)	
Shawnee, Oklahoma and Missouri Coal and Railway Company	1899	1903	1903 (to Ozark and Cherokee Central)	
Little Rock and Texas Railway	1887	1887	1926 (to Frisco of 1916)	Hackett (on the line to Paris) to Mansfield
Kansas City and Southwestern Railroad	1884	1885	1897 (to Frisco of 1896)	Beaumont (on the line to Wichita) to state line near Arkansas City
Kansas, Oklahoma and Gulf Railway	1897	1899	1899 (to Frisco of 1896)	State line near Arkansas City to Blackwell
Blackwell, Enid and Southwestern Railway	1900	1901	1907 (to Frisco of 1896)	Blackwell to state line near Vernon
Blackwell, Enid and Texas Railway	1901	1902	1904 (to Frisco of Texas)	State line to Vernon
St. Louis, San Francisco and New Orleans Railroad	1902	1902	1907 (to Frisco of 1896)	Hope to Ardmore, with a branch to near Denison
Arkansas and Choctaw Railway	1895	1896	1902 (renamed St. Louis, San Francisco and New Orleans)	

== Other extensions through Mississippi and Alabama ==
Name	Incorporation	Began operations	Succession	Notes
Muscle Shoals, Birmingham and Pensacola Railroad	1924	1924	1928 (to Frisco of 1916)	Aberdeen to Pensacola
Muscle Shoals, Birmingham and Pensacola Railway	1922	1922	1924 (to Muscle Shoals, Birmingham and Pensacola Railroad)	
Gulf, Florida and Alabama Railway	1911	1912	1922 (to Muscle Shoals, Birmingham and Pensacola Railway)	
Gulf Ports Terminal Railway	1916	1916	1927 (to Muscle Shoals, Birmingham and Pensacola Railroad)	Pensacola to Muscogee, with an incomplete branch towards Mobile
Pensacola, Mobile and New Orleans Railway	1907	1908	1917 (to Gulf Ports Terminal)	
Pensacola and Perdido Railroad	1869	1870	1915 (to Pensacola, Mobile and New Orleans)	
Pensacola, Alabama and Tennessee Railroad	1892	1893	1915 (to Pensacola, Mobile and New Orleans)	
Alabama, Tennessee and Northern Railroad	1918	1918	1971 (to Frisco of 1916)	Reform to Mobile
Alabama, Tennessee and Northern Railway	1913	1913	1918 (to Alabama, Tennessee and Northern Railroad)	
Alabama, Tennessee and Northern Railroad	1906	1906	1913 (to Alabama, Tennessee and Northern Railway)	
Carrollton Short Line Railway	1897	1899	1906 (renamed Alabama, Tennessee and Northern Railroad)	
Mobile Terminal and Railway Company	1910	1910	1913 (to Alabama, Tennessee and Northern Railway)	
Tombigbee Valley Railroad	1904	1904	1913 (to Alabama, Tennessee and Northern Railway)	
