= El Reno Heritage Express =

Historic streetcar service in Oklahoma

Heritage Express
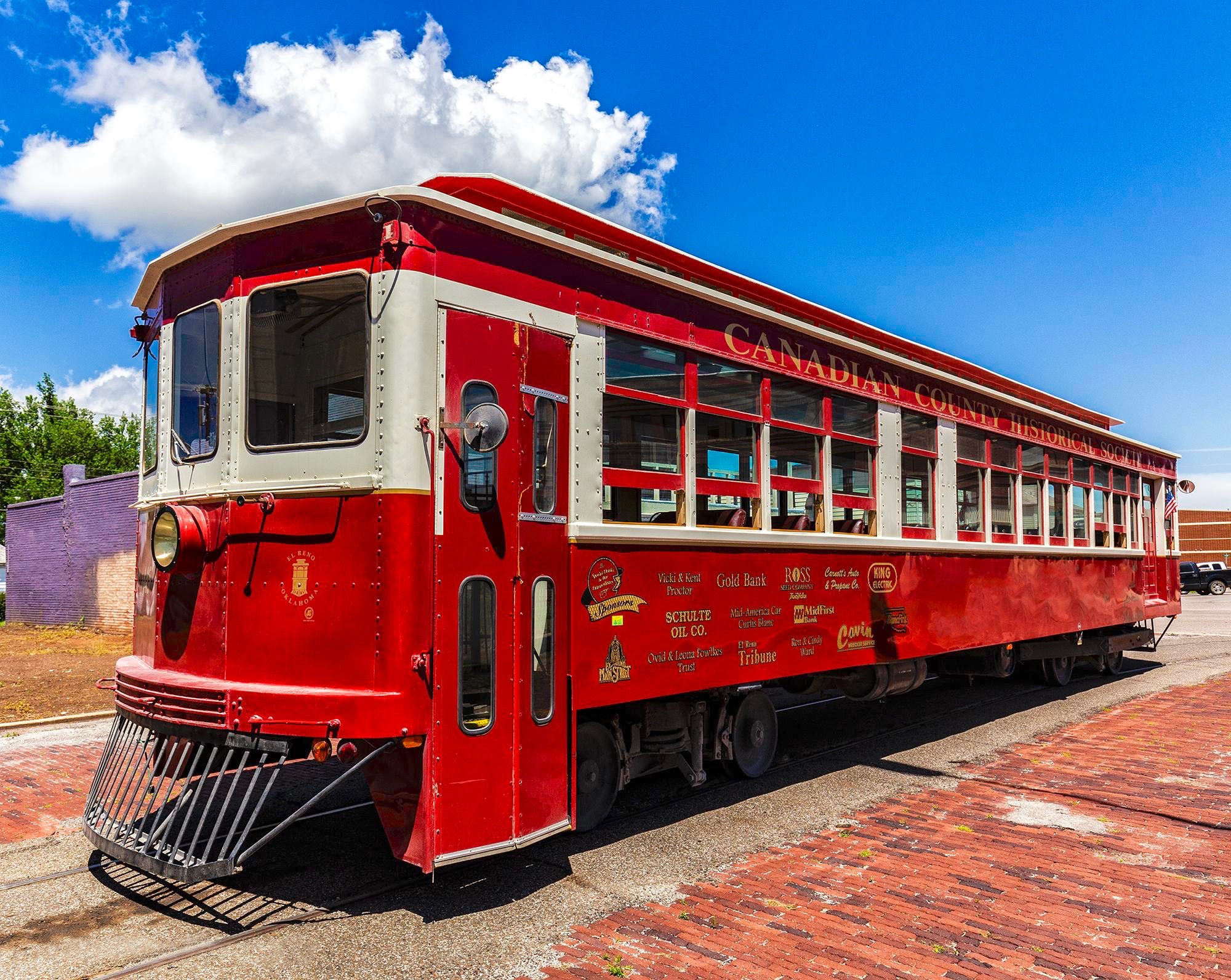
- The system's J.G. Brill Strafford Car

Overview
- Owner: City of El Reno
- Locale: El Reno, Oklahoma
- Stations: 1

Service
- Type: Heritage streetcar
- Operator(s): Canadian County Historical Society
- Depot(s): El Reno Rock Island Depot
- Rolling stock: J.G. Brill Strafford No. 145

History
- Opened: August 25, 2001

Technical
- Line length: 1.5 mi (2.4 km)
- Track length: less than 1 mi (1.6 km)
- Number of tracks: 1
- Character: street running
- Track gauge: 4 ft 8 1/2 in (1,435 mm) standard gauge

The El Reno Heritage Express is a heritage streetcar line in El Reno, Oklahoma. It opened in 2001 as the only operating streetcar in the state (since joined by the Oklahoma City Streetcar). A single J.G. Brill Strafford Car runs a 1.5-mile (2.4 km) excursion service from the Canadian County Historical Museum in the former El Reno Chicago, Rock Island and Pacific Railroad Depot to a balloon loop downtown via a single-track line embedded in the road surface of Watts Street and Bickford Avenue.

== History ==
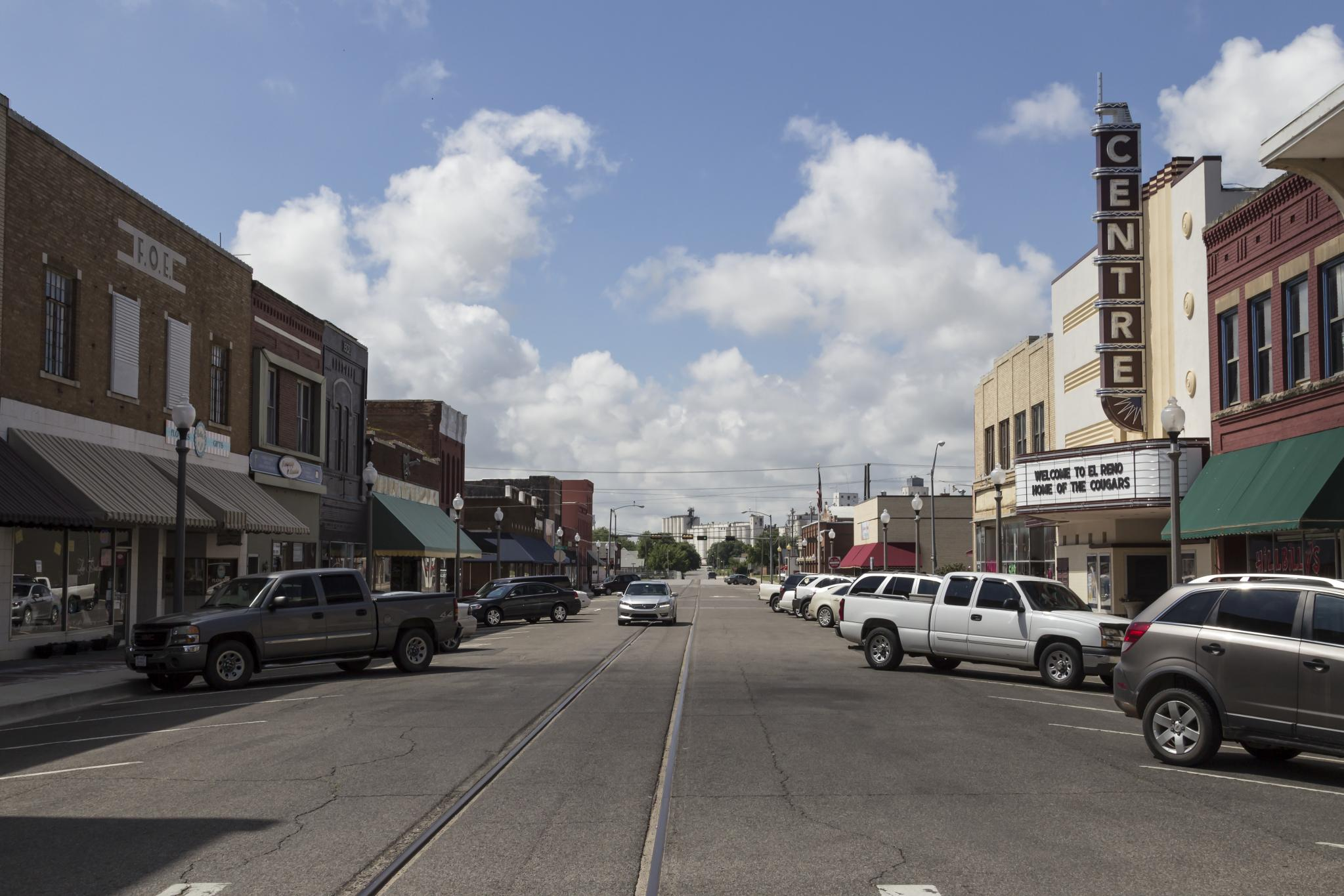
Downtown El Reno: Heritage Express rails run in the street, 2014

From 1911 to 1947, El Reno had trolley service. It was a terminal of the El Reno Interurban Railway (later the Oklahoma Railway Company), which ran to Oklahoma City. That service ceased after World War II. The affordability of private automobiles reduced passenger traffic for mass transit.

The modern trolley line was built as part of a multi-purpose project by the city to rehabilitate the downtown's drainage system, which had a history of failing and causing flooding issues for nearby businesses. It was part of a series of projects that the city began in 1988 to revitalize downtown through the Main Street America program, a subsidiary of the National Trust for Historic Preservation.

Unable to fund this entire construction project, the city partnered with the state to secure an Intermodal Surface Transportation Efficiency Act (ISTEA) grant to rebuild downtown streets and sewers. It was conditioned on the city agreeing also to install, at the same time, a rail-based transit system that it would financially support and maintain. The city of El Reno was required to pay 20% of the $1.7 million (Note: equivalent to $3.02 million in 2024 adjusted for inflation) project cost.

To begin service, the city acquired a disused 1924 J.G. Brill Strafford Car from Philadelphia, Pennsylvania, for $215,000, (Note: equivalent to $392,567 in 2024 adjusted for inflation) to be restored and converted to propane power in Iowa for this new system. The city approached the Canadian County Historical Society, which had occupied the former rail depot, to operate the new system, and it quickly accepted.

Service began on August 25, 2001, after a dedication ceremony the previous day. It was the only trolley line then operating in the state, but Oklahoma City has now also instituted a new line.

== Service ==
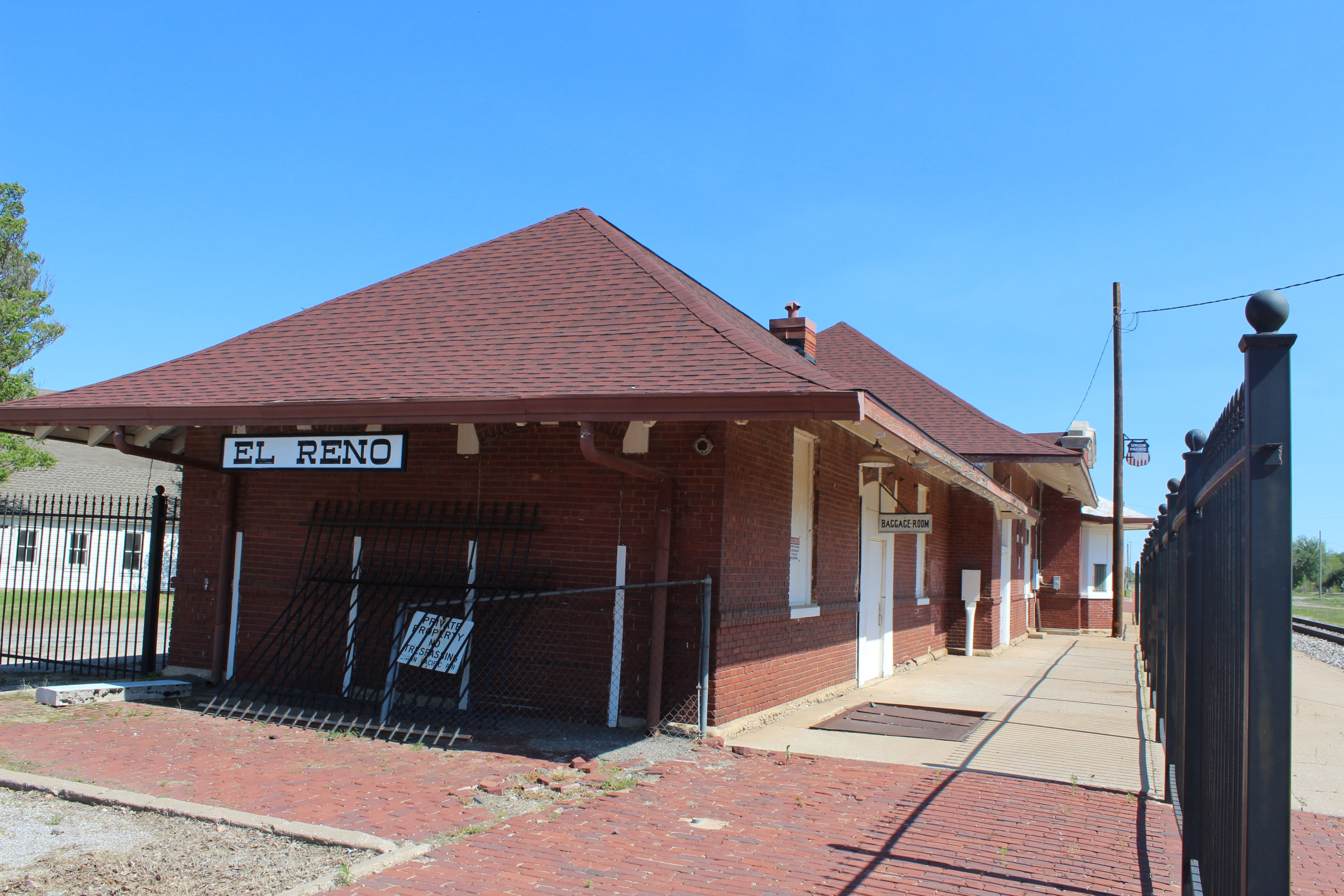
The Rock Island Depot, 2014

The trolley runs several times a day from the former El Reno Chicago, Rock Island and Pacific Railroad Depot (now used by the historical society) to a balloon loop downtown. It travels via a single-track line that is embedded in the road surface of Watts Street and Bickford Avenue, which has a shopping district. Conductors give tours of what visitors are seeing as they pass through downtown.

In 2019, the line was operating Wednesday through Sunday, making several runs from 10 a.m. to 5 p.m. with a later start on Sunday. In 2025, trolleys ran four times daily on Saturdays between April and September.

== In Pop Culture ==
The Streetcar appeared in the 2024 film Twisters with a tornado derailing it.

== See also ==
- List of Oklahoma railroads
