= Lawton, Wichita Falls and Northwestern Railway =

Railway in Oklahoma

The Lawton, Wichita Falls and Northwestern Railway was an effort around the time of Oklahoma statehood to build a railroad from Lawton, Oklahoma to Wichita Falls, Texas, about 100 miles. Despite a company being organized and bonds issued, no rails were actually laid.

== History ==
The Lawton, Wichita Falls and Northwestern Railway Company (LWF&NW) was incorporated around 1906 under the laws of Oklahoma Territory. The incorporators were J.M. Bellamy of Lawton, Will R. Waller of Oklahoma City, J.L. Conner and G.A. Rodgers of St. Louis, and C.P. Hoffs of Kansas City, with Bellamy as President The stated purpose of the line was to build a railway from Lawton to Wichita Falls, about 100 miles.

Lawton had rail connections almost from the date of its founding in August, 1901. The Oklahoma City and Western Railroad passed through in a northeast-to-southwest orientation on an eventual route between Oklahoma City and Quanah, Texas. And, an Enid and Anadarko Railway line was constructed between Lawton and Waurika, Oklahoma, the latter having a connection with the Chicago, Rock Island and Pacific Railway.

However, the town had no direct connection to Wichita Falls, which around the turn of the century was an important transportation and supply center for northwest Texas and southern Oklahoma. The LWF&NW would have created that direct connection over mostly flat grasslands. Towards accomplishing its goal, the company offered up to $800,000 in First Mortgage Gold Bonds, with a date of September 1, 1908. And, the route the line would have taken was determined. However, the effort broke down before rails were laid.

Later, in the 1922-1923 timeframe, the Wichita Falls and Oklahoma Railway laid tracks into Waurika, thus completing a fairly compact route connecting Wichita Falls with Lawton via Waurika. Perhaps ironically, the line proved unimportant, and was abandoned by 1942.
