= Denison and Washita Valley Railway =

Defunct railroad

Overview
- Locale: Oklahoma and Texas
- Dates of operation: 1886–1903

Technical
- Track gauge: 4 ft 8 1/2 in (1,435 mm) standard gauge

The Denison and Washita Valley Railway (D&WV) existed from 1886 to 1903. It had disconnected trackage, partially around Denison, Texas, and partially in a coal mining area in what is now Oklahoma with a line running between Atoka and Coalgate.

== History ==
The D&WV was incorporated under Texas law January 8, 1886. It was affiliated with the Missouri–Kansas–Texas Railroad (the Katy), which had built through what was then Indian Territory—and specifically, through Atoka—and into Denison in 1872. The D&WV's initial goal was to construct a line from Denison over the Territory to a point at or near Fort Smith, Arkansas. Accordingly, authority to build in Indian Territory was duly obtained from the U.S. Congress.

However, the backers of the company had limited financial reach, and little trackage was actually built. In Indian Territory, the D&WV constructed 4.9 miles of rails from Lehigh to Coalgate in 1889, when the latter had just started shipping coal. This, together with 9.7 miles of line from Atoka to Lehigh previously built in 1882 by the Katy, constituted all the trackage the D&WV ever owned in the Territory. Around Denison, the company by early 1888 had five to seven miles of mainline track constructed, and by 1895 had added nothing more than two miles of yard tracks and sidings. In that year of 1895, the D&WV had one locomotive and 119 freight cars, mostly operating in the Coalgate mining area.

On May 13, 1903, the Texas portion, then being operated by a Katy affiliate, was sold to that company. The Territory portion was split between the Katy and the Texas and Oklahoma Railroad. Most of the trackage in Oklahoma was later leased to the Oklahoma City-Ada-Atoka Railway in 1924. By 1985 the Oklahoma trackage had been abandoned.
