= Enid City Railway =

Enid City Railway Company
Overview
- Headquarters: Dayton, Ohio
- Locale: Oklahoma
- Dates of operation: 1907–1929

Technical
- Track gauge: 4 ft 8 1/2 in (1,435 mm) standard gauge

The Enid City Railway Company was a street car franchise in Enid, Oklahoma, from 1907 to 1929.

== History ==
On January 4, 1907, the Enid City Council awarded a street car franchise to C.H. Bosler of Dayton, Ohio, who had also constructed the Tulsa Street Railway. The chartered and municipal franchise was granted in 1907 for 50 years, and the Enid Railway Company was organized on January 7, 1907.

The city council dictated the following requirements for service:

- line must serve university, all three railroad depots, and all sides of the square, equally
- frequency of service was limited to no more than 20 minutes during 12 hours of the day, and no more than 30 minutes for another four hours.
- trolleys had right-of-way over everything but fire engines
- street car speed limit: 10 mph in the business district; 20 mph in residential areas

The construction of the road and the equipment cost $274,556.02.

== Service ==
Service began June 3, 1907. Enid Electric and Gas Company provided the electricity for car operation. In 1908, it owned 9 motor cars and 6 trail cars.

On-duty policemen, firemen, and postmen rode free, as did children under five with adult supervision. The route took 14 minutes and covered 6.92 miles (11.14 km) of line. The route covered all three railroad depots, Oklahoma Christian University, the Enid Cemetery, baseball parks, residential areas, the public library, county courthouse, and hotels.

=== Lakewood Electric Park ===
The company also owned Lakewood Electric Park which was located on North Cleveland. It consisted of twenty-three acres of oak forest and an artificial lake covering eight acres. Amenities included a bath house, band stand, open-air theatre auditorium, pavilion, boat house, bowling alley, scenic railway, and other varied amusements.

== Income ==
In its first year of operation, the company received a gross income of $20,164, and net income minus operating expenses of $9,490. It carried 386,575 passengers from June 3 to December 31, 1907.

In 1918, the company still owed $50,000 of bond debt to the Dayton Savings & Trust Company. Its net revenue of $5,941.87 in 1917, was insufficient to pay the annual bond interest of 5 percent. The company operated 14 cars at its peak in 1913, and was down to 10 by 1918.

Rates were increased with approval of the Oklahoma Corporation Commission from 5 cents to 7 cents on December 1, 1918. 25 cents bought four rides, a dollar bought seventeen. The city council later refused to let the company raise fares above 7 cents.

== Demise of the System ==
On August 29, 1929, the Enid city Council passed an ordinance outlawing the entire street car system. Manager Morris McGrath, ignored the ruling, and continued operation. One streetcar operator, A.T. Snowder was arrested. The chief of police threatened to arrest McGrath on August 31, 1929, if he didn't cease operation. That same day, city busses began operation, and in September, the overhead wires were removed. The bus system was short lived, due to competition by taxis.
