= Oilton, Oklahoma =

City in Oklahoma, US

- City
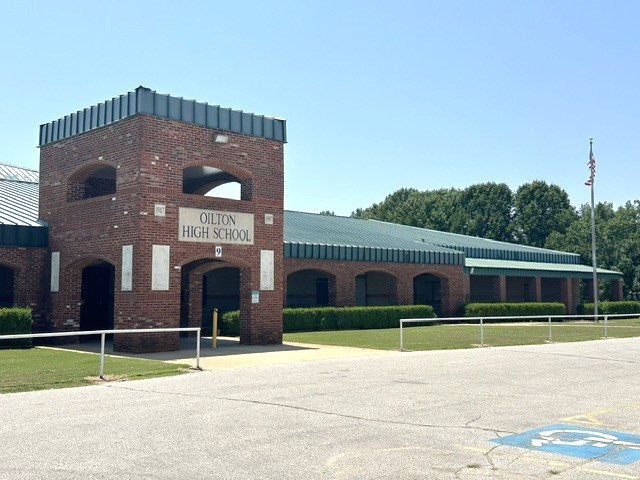
- Oilton High School in July of 2026

- Location within Creek County, and the state of Oklahoma
- Coordinates: 36°04′58″N 96°34′53″W
- Country: United States
- State: Oklahoma
- County: Creek

Area
  - Total: 1.13 sq mi (2.93 km^{2})
  - Land: 1.13 sq mi (2.93 km^{2})
  - Water: 0 sq mi (0.00 km^{2})
- Elevation: 794 ft (242 m)

Population (2020)
  - Total: 885
  - Density: 783.0/sq mi (302.32/km^{2})
- Time zone: UTC-6 (Central (CST))
  - Summer (DST): UTC-5 (CDT)
- ZIP code: 74052
- Area codes: 539/918
- FIPS code: 40-54000
- GNIS feature ID: 2411307
- Website: www.cityofoilton.com

Oilton is a city in Creek County, Oklahoma, United States. The population was 885 at the 2020 census, a 12.6% decline from the 1,013 recorded in 2010.

== History ==
Oilton began during the development of the Cushing-Drumright Oil Field. The first lots were sold in January and February 1915 by Walter Eaton and Ed Dunn. A post office was established May 5, 1915. The First State Bank opened and the newspaper, the Oilton Gusher, began publication in 1915. In the same year, the Oil Belt Terminal Railway connected Oilton to Jennings, while the Oil Fields and Santa Fe Railway, an Atchison, Topeka and Santa Fe Railway subsidiary, bought the Oil Belt and additionally connected the town to Cushing and Drumright. By 1920, Oilton's population officially peaked at 2,231. It became an incorporated city on April 18, 1921. Despite a rapid drop in petroleum production in the Cushing-Drumright field throughout the 1920s and 1930s, Oilton survived when a number of other oilboom towns did not.

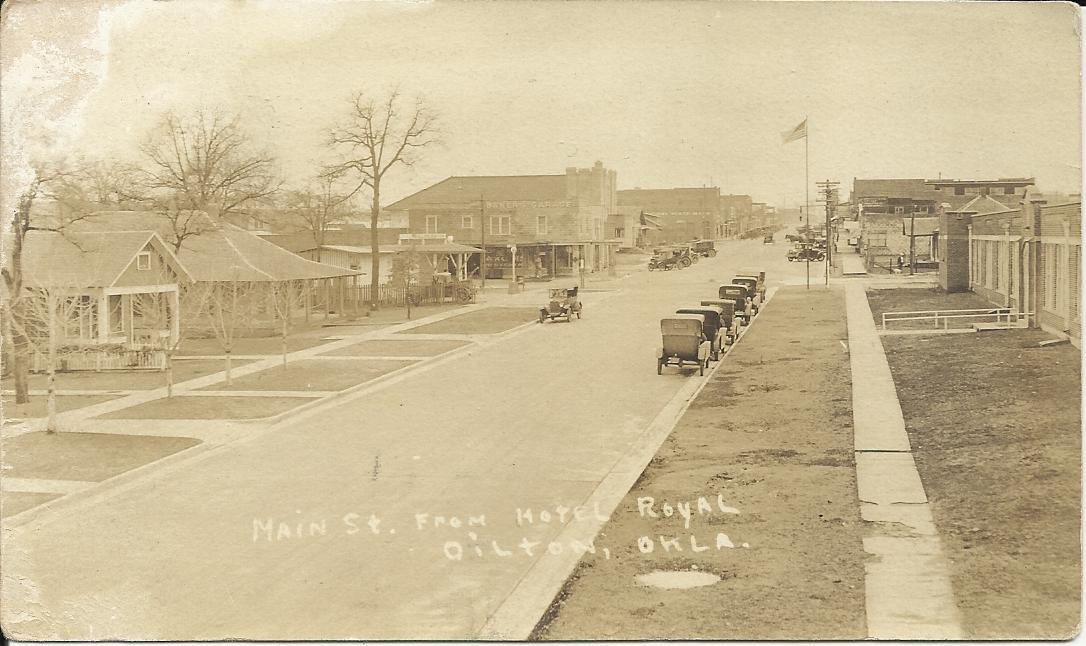
Oilton, Oklahoma

== Geography ==
Oilton is located in northwestern Creek County. It is on the south side of the Cimarron River near the head of the inundation limit of Keystone Lake.

Oklahoma State Highway 99 passes through the community, leading north 7 miles (11 km) to Jennings and south 7 miles (11 km) to Drumright. Tulsa is 38 miles (61 km) to the east, and Stillwater is 30 miles (48 km) to the west.

According to the United States Census Bureau, Oilton has a total area of 1.0 square mile (2.7 km^{2}), all land.

== Demographics ==
Historical population
Census	Pop.	Note	%±
1920	2,231		—
1930	1,518		−32.0%
1940	1,225		−19.3%
1950	1,109		−9.5%
1960	1,100		−0.8%
1970	1,087		−1.2%
1980	1,244		14.4%
1990	1,060		−14.8%
2000	1,099		3.7%
2010	1,013		−7.8%
2020	885		−12.6%
U.S. Decennial Census

=== 2020 census ===
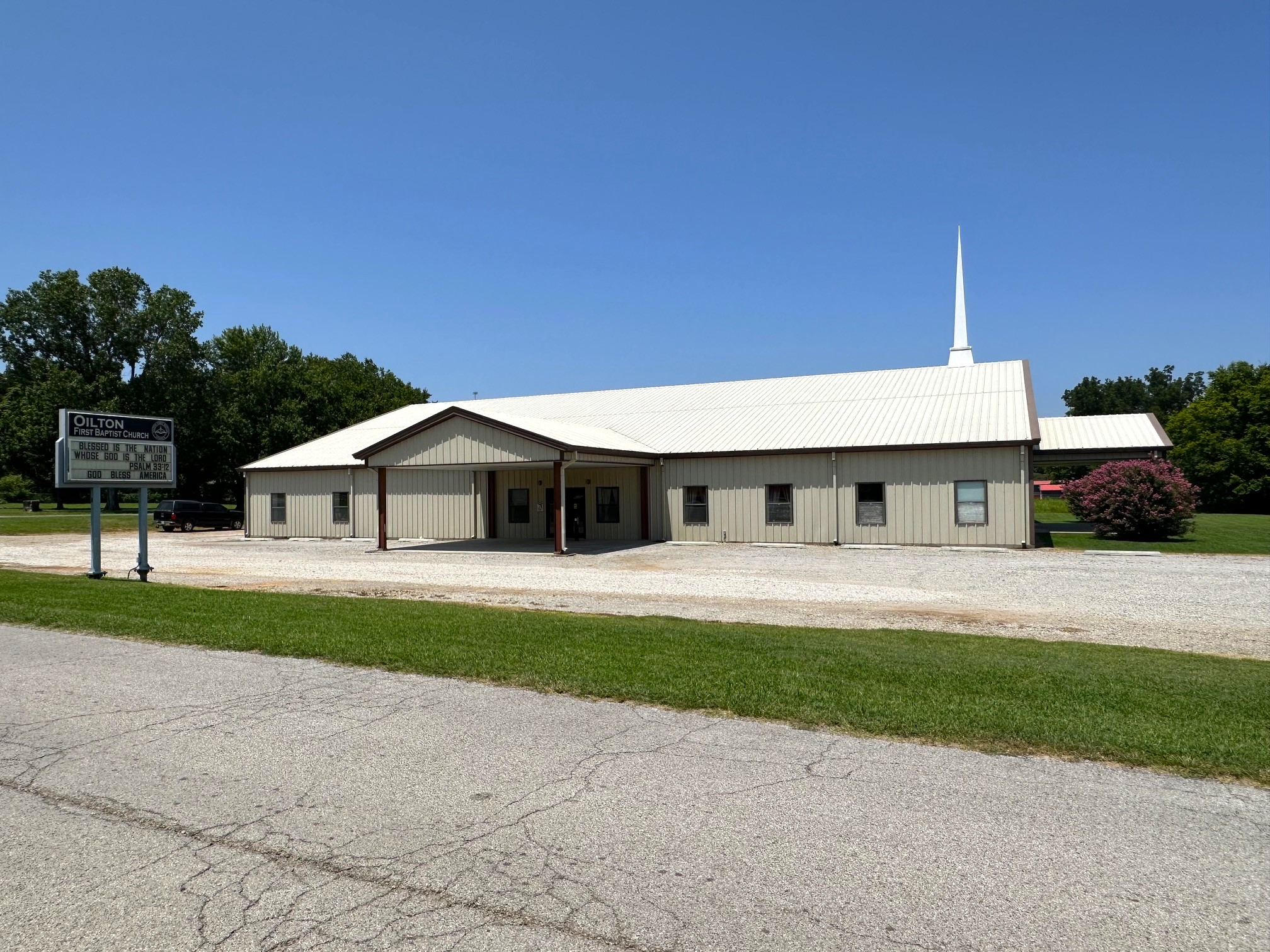
Oilton First Baptist Church, 7-2026

As of the 2020 census, Oilton had a population of 885. The median age was 33.8 years. 27.9% of residents were under the age of 18 and 15.4% of residents were 65 years of age or older. For every 100 females there were 95.4 males, and for every 100 females age 18 and over there were 84.9 males age 18 and over.

As of the 2020 census, 0% of residents lived in urban areas while 100.0% lived in rural areas.

As of the 2020 census, there were 370 households in Oilton, of which 31.6% had children under the age of 18 living in them. Of all households, 40.3% were married-couple households, 20.3% were households with a male householder and no spouse or partner present, and 33.0% were households with a female householder and no spouse or partner present. About 28.6% of all households were made up of individuals and 15.1% had someone living alone who was 65 years of age or older.

As of the 2020 census, there were 457 housing units, of which 19.0% were vacant. Among occupied housing units, 64.1% were owner-occupied and 35.9% were renter-occupied. The homeowner vacancy rate was 1.7% and the rental vacancy rate was 6.3%.

Racial composition as of the 2020 census
Race	Percent
White	86.6%
Black or African American	1.2%
American Indian and Alaska Native	6.3%
Asian	0.2%
Native Hawaiian and Other Pacific Islander	0.1%
Some other race	0.6%
Two or more races	5.0%
Hispanic or Latino (of any race)	2.5%

=== 2000 census ===
As of the 2000 census, there were 1,099 people, 447 households, and 291 families residing in the city. The population density was 1,690.2 inhabitants per square mile (652.6/km^{2}). There were 526 housing units at an average density of 809.0 per square mile (312.4/km^{2}). The racial makeup of the city was 86.72% White, 0.82% African American, 6.64% Native American, 0.73% from other races, and 5.10% from two or more races. Hispanic or Latino of any race were 2.73% of the population.

There were 447 households, out of which 33.6% had children under the age of 18 living with them, 51.2% were married couples living together, 10.3% had a female householder with no husband present, and 34.7% were non-families. 30.9% of all households were made up of individuals, and 16.3% had someone living alone who was 65 years of age or older. The average household size was 2.46 and the average family size was 3.11.

In the city, the population was spread out, with 29.1% under the age of 18, 9.2% from 18 to 24, 26.7% from 25 to 44, 20.0% from 45 to 64, and 15.0% who were 65 years of age or older. The median age was 34 years. For every 100 females, there were 89.2 males. For every 100 females age 18 and over, there were 87.3 males.

The median income for a household in the city was $23,274, and the median income for a family was $29,766. Males had a median income of $26,250 versus $19,219 for females. The per capita income for the city was $11,831. About 21.7% of families and 26.4% of the population were below the poverty line, including 35.7% of those under age 18 and 12.7% of those age 65 or over.

== Economy ==
Oil production has steadily declined. The local economy is largely agricultural. About 91 percent of the employed Oilton residents commute to jobs in Bristow, Sapulpa and Sand Springs.
