= Miami Mineral Belt Railroad =

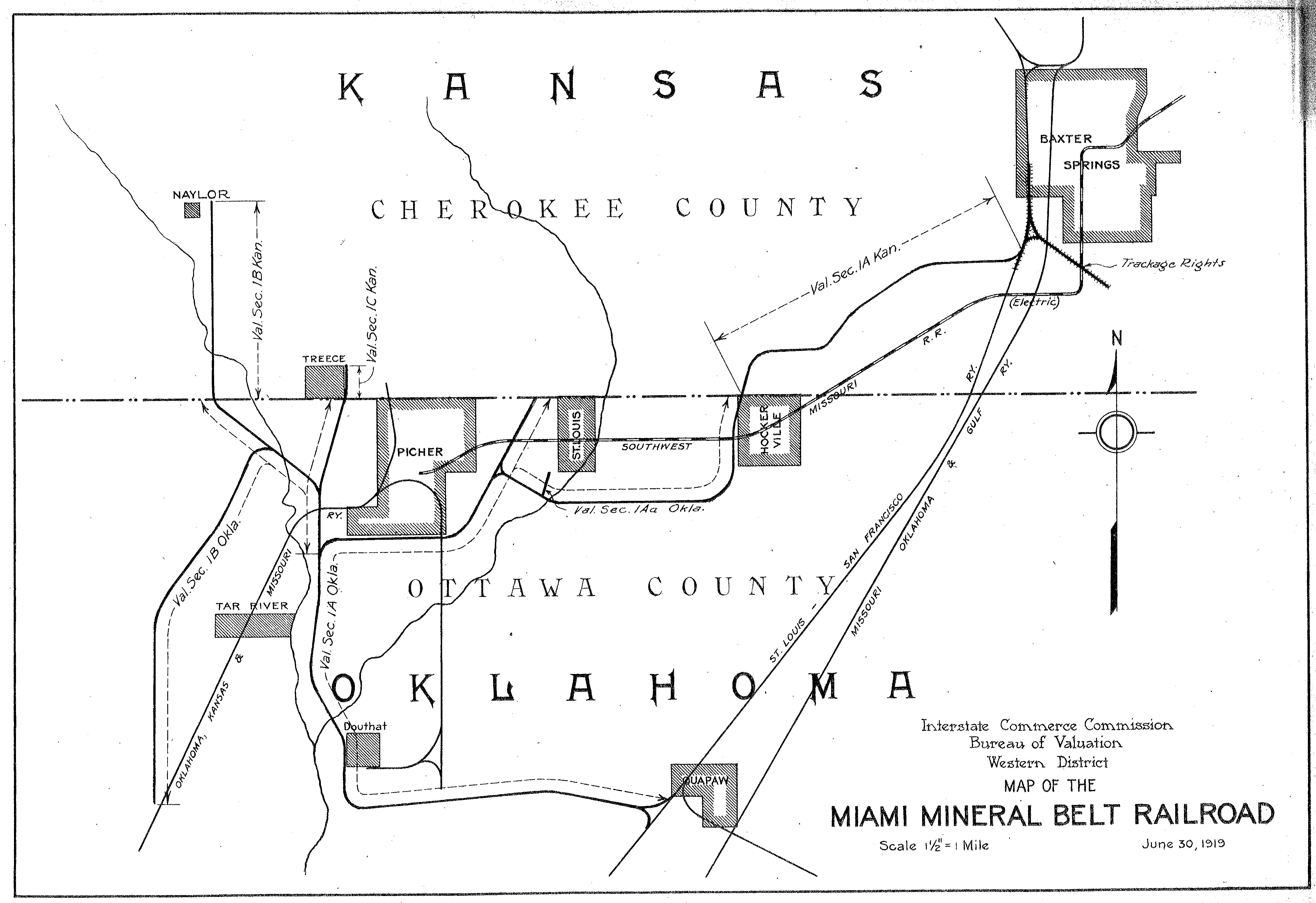
- 1919 map of the railroad

Overview
- Headquarters: Oklahoma City, Oklahoma
- Locale: Oklahoma
- Dates of operation: 1917–1950

Technical
- Track gauge: 4 ft 8 1/2 in (1,435 mm)
- Length: 40 mi (64 km)

The Miami Mineral Belt Railroad (MMBR) served the Miami and Picher lead mining areas in that portion of the Tri-state mining district located in far northeastern Oklahoma. It was closely associated with the St. Louis-San Francisco Railway (Frisco) for its entire history, and was eventually absorbed into the Frisco.

== History ==
The MMBR was incorporated February 26, 1917 in Oklahoma and June 27, 1917 in Kansas. Its sole stockholder was T.B. Slick, and it was headquartered in Oklahoma City. It was created with the active participation of the Frisco, which wanted a share of the transportation trade in a very productive mining area. Toward that goal, the Frisco provided and leased the rails to the railroad’s creators, and guaranteed a 10% return on construction and equipment costs until a 110% payout on investment had been reached. The Frisco, and its affiliated Kansas City, Fort Scott and Memphis Railway, also leased locomotives and rolling stock to the MMBR. The line traveled westerly, northerly, and northeasterly from Quapaw, Oklahoma through Picher, Oklahoma and on to Baxter Springs, Kansas, 11.05 miles, forming a loop through the Miami and Picher lead mining areas. The railway started operation July 6, 1917. Including various side, yard, and spur tracks which totaled 29 miles in 1929, the railroad eventually included about 40 miles of trackage. Despite the name, it never ran to Miami, Oklahoma, which was to the southwest.

The line was essentially a switching operation to gather traffic from mine and mill spurs and haul it to the Frisco interchange points at Quapaw and Baxter Springs. Most of the traffic was outbound lead and zinc ores, but the line did handle some inbound merchandise as well as passengers.

While Frisco was given ICC permission to acquire the line in 1923, it appears Frisco leased the line instead, only acquiring the stock of the carrier on July 31, 1929. Effective January 1, 1930, the line was leased back to the Frisco, where for Frisco’s internal purposes it became the Picher Branch of the Afton Sub-Division of the Northern Division. The line was not officially absorbed into the Frisco until mid-1950.
