= Oil Fields and Santa Fe Railway =

Former railroad line

Overview
- Headquarters: Oklahoma City, Oklahoma
- Locale: Oklahoma
- Dates of operation: 1915–1941

Technical
- Track gauge: 4 ft 8 1/2 in (1,435 mm)
- Length: 28.4 mi (45.7 km)

The Oil Fields and Santa Fe Railway ("Oil Fields") was an Atchison, Topeka and Santa Fe Railway ("AT&SF") subsidiary. It owned trackage in and about the Cushing-Drumright Oil Field in Oklahoma, and was leased to and operated by the AT&SF from its inception in the 1915-1916 timeframe until its merger into the AT&SF in 1941. All of its tracks were abandoned by 1963.

== History ==
To take advantage of possible traffic in the promising oil and gas area known as the Cushing-Drumright Field, two predecessor rail lines were created. The Cushing Traction Company was incorporated under the General Laws of Oklahoma on May 23, 1914. It was an electrified interurban with pretentions of joining the towns of Cushing, Oilton, and Drumright in Oklahoma, but only managed by 1915 to build 10 miles of track east-northeast from Cushing to the ephemeral town of Pemeta, Oklahoma, just to the northwest of Drumright, although it purchased additional right-of-way elsewhere. Meanwhile, the Oil Belt Terminal Railway Company was incorporated under the General Laws of Oklahoma on September 23, 1914, and built 8 miles of track in 1915 from Jennings, Oklahoma south to Oilton.

The AT&SF was interested in getting in on trade in the field, and incorporated the Oil Fields and Santa Fe Railway Company as a wholly owned subsidiary under the General Laws of Oklahoma on April 7, 1915. Oil Fields then purchased the assets of the other two companies on May 7, 1915, and completed building additional trackage in 1915 from Pemeta east and north to Oilton, 5.9 miles, and from a junction on that line around Frey, Oklahoma (just southeast of Pemeta) going south to Drumright. The completed system, from Cushing to Jennings with a branch to Drumright, was leased to the AT&SF effective January 1, 1916 and operated as a standard-gauge steam railway.

The primary traffic on the approximately 28.4 mile system was petroleum and agricultural products, though passengers were also carried. The line interchanged with the Missouri–Kansas–Texas Railroad ("Katy") and the St. Louis–San Francisco Railway ("Frisco") at Jennings, the Frisco at Drumright, and the AT&SF and Katy at Cushing.

As the field depleted and pipelines began carrying the petroleum, the AT&SF began abandonments. On March 1, 1934, the ICC approved abandonment of the line from Oilton to Jennings, about 7.4 miles. Passenger service was discontinued May 15, 1939. On January 16, 1942, based on an application filed the previous February, the ICC approved abandonment from the Frey junction to Oilton, about 4.2 miles, leaving the latter town without rail service.

About this same time, Oil Fields was officially merged into the AT&SF, the ICC approval occurring June 28, 1941. In subsequent history, the remaining line from Cushing to Drumright was abandoned with ICC approval dated February 15, 1963.
