= Oklahoma & Rich Mountain Railroad =

Overview
- Locale: Oklahoma
- Dates of operation: 1926–1942

Technical
- Track gauge: 4 ft 8 1/2 in (1,435 mm) standard gauge
- Length: 17 miles (27 km)

The Oklahoma & Rich Mountain Railroad was a logging railway running from Page, Oklahoma to Pine Valley, Oklahoma, about 17 miles. It began in 1926 and was abandoned in 1942.

== History ==
A place called Muse, having been established in Indian Territory on October 1, 1896, became a logging company town renamed Pine Valley on December 16, 1926. (A new town called Muse was established on May 11, 1927, at a slightly different location.) The logging enterprise, called the Pine Valley Lumber Company, a subsidiary of Dierks Lumber & Coal Company, ran a railway that same year from Page, Oklahoma into Pine Valley, about 17 miles, said line being located in the area of a long ridge across parts of Oklahoma and Arkansas known as Rich Mountain. Operationally, the railroad carried mostly wood products; however, it was a common carrier, so it did also provide passenger service. It interconnected with the Kansas City Southern Railway at Page.

At its peak, Pine Valley had a population of about 1,500. However, over time the depletion of the forests started to dry up both operations in the town and traffic for the railroad. In 1942, the railroad was abandoned, and Pine Valley became essentially a ghost town soon after. (Muse continues to exist, with a population of several hundred.)
