= Texas North Western Railway =

Shortline Railroad

Overview
- Parent company: TNW Corporation
- Headquarters: Dallas, Texas
- Reporting mark: TXNW
- Locale: Texas
- Dates of operation: January 28, 1982; 43 years ago–present

Technical
- Track gauge: 4 ft 8 1/2 in (1,435 mm) standard gauge
- Length: 151 miles (243 km)

Other
- Website: www.tnwcorporation.com

The Texas North Western Railway (“TXNW”), sometimes called the Texas Northwestern Railway, is a shortline railroad which had operations in Texas, Oklahoma, and Kansas, but is now limited to an area around Sunray, Texas. It was formed in 1982 to take over some of the trackage of the bankrupt Chicago, Rock Island and Pacific Railroad (“Rock Island”).

== History ==
After the Rock Island entered bankruptcy on March 17, 1975, a judge determined on January 25, 1980 that the railroad should be liquidated because it could not be successfully reorganized, and on June 2, 1980 ordered a systemwide abandonment. But just before the latter action, Congress had on May 30, 1980 enacted the Rock Island Railroad Transition and Employee Assistance Act, one of the goals of which was to prevent cessation of rail service over lines for which purchasers were available, and to keep trains rolling until matters were settled.

Against that background, the TXNW was formed on January 28, 1982, to purchase the Rock Island line running north-northwest from Stinnett, Texas to Hardesty, Oklahoma, about 97 miles. The railway additionally picked up a branch off this line which ran west from Morse Junction (just south of Morse) though Sunray to Etter, Texas. Also, the TXNW received temporary trackage rights to continue north from Hardesty on to Liberal, Kansas, an additional distance of approximately 33.15 miles.

However, most of this original trackage was gone by 1987, including Morse to Hardesty, Pringle to Stinnett, and the temporary rights into Kansas. The railroad as it currently exists has about 151 miles of storage and loop track, located about 50 miles north of Amarillo near Sunray, Texas, from which transloading and other services are provided. The line interconnects with the BNSF Railway.
