= Bartlesville Interurban Railway =

Electric trolley system in Oklahoma

Overview
- Headquarters: Bartlesville, Oklahoma
- Locale: Oklahoma
- Dates of operation: 1905–1920

Technical
- Length: 10.1 mi (16.3 km)

The Bartlesville Interurban Railway was an electric trolley system operating between and around the cities of Bartlesville and Dewey in the State of Oklahoma. It was chartered in 1905, but wasn't operational until 1908, and In final form it was just over 10 miles in length. It was shut down entirely in 1920.

== History ==
Plans were initially floated to connect the Oklahoma towns of Bartlesville and Dewey with Coffeyville, Kansas, with the ultimate goal of reaching Independence, Cherryvale and Parsons, Kansas to the north, while reaching Ramona, Oklahoma to the south. Toward that goal, the Bartlesville Interurban Railway Company was incorporated in Oklahoma on December 8, 1905, focusing on the short-term goal of connecting Bartlesville and Dewey, about 4 miles. Progress was not rapid: the cities of Bartlesville and Dewey only got around to granting a franchise to the company on July 18, 1906, and the board of the company did not accept the franchise until June 10, 1907. Steel did not begin to arrive until December 1907, and the ceremonial spike to start construction was not driven until April 1908. The streetcars arrived June 22, 1908.

Advancement was made over time. A south loop was added in December 1915. By 1916, eight railcars were in use, and the route went south from Dewey, through Bartlesville's Tuxedo suburb, on to Bartlesville, and then to the southwest to three smelters (an area sometimes called “Smelterville”), making about 10.1 miles in total length.

Particularly later on, profit was elusive. Even though the generators installed to provide electric power to the trolleys were used to sell surplus power to the communities along the route, the system wasn't profitable after 1913. World War I provided a brief boom, but authority to abandon the southern loop was granted in June 1919, service to Dewey ended in October 1919, and the entire system was shut down July 19, 1920.

Rail removal wasn't immediate. The rails in Dewey were only dug up during a World War II scrap metal drive. But by that time, rails in Bartlesville had been paved over. In October 2023 a street project uncovered a portion of the rail line, and a rail section was removed and relocated to the Bartlesville Area History Museum.
