= AT&L Railroad =

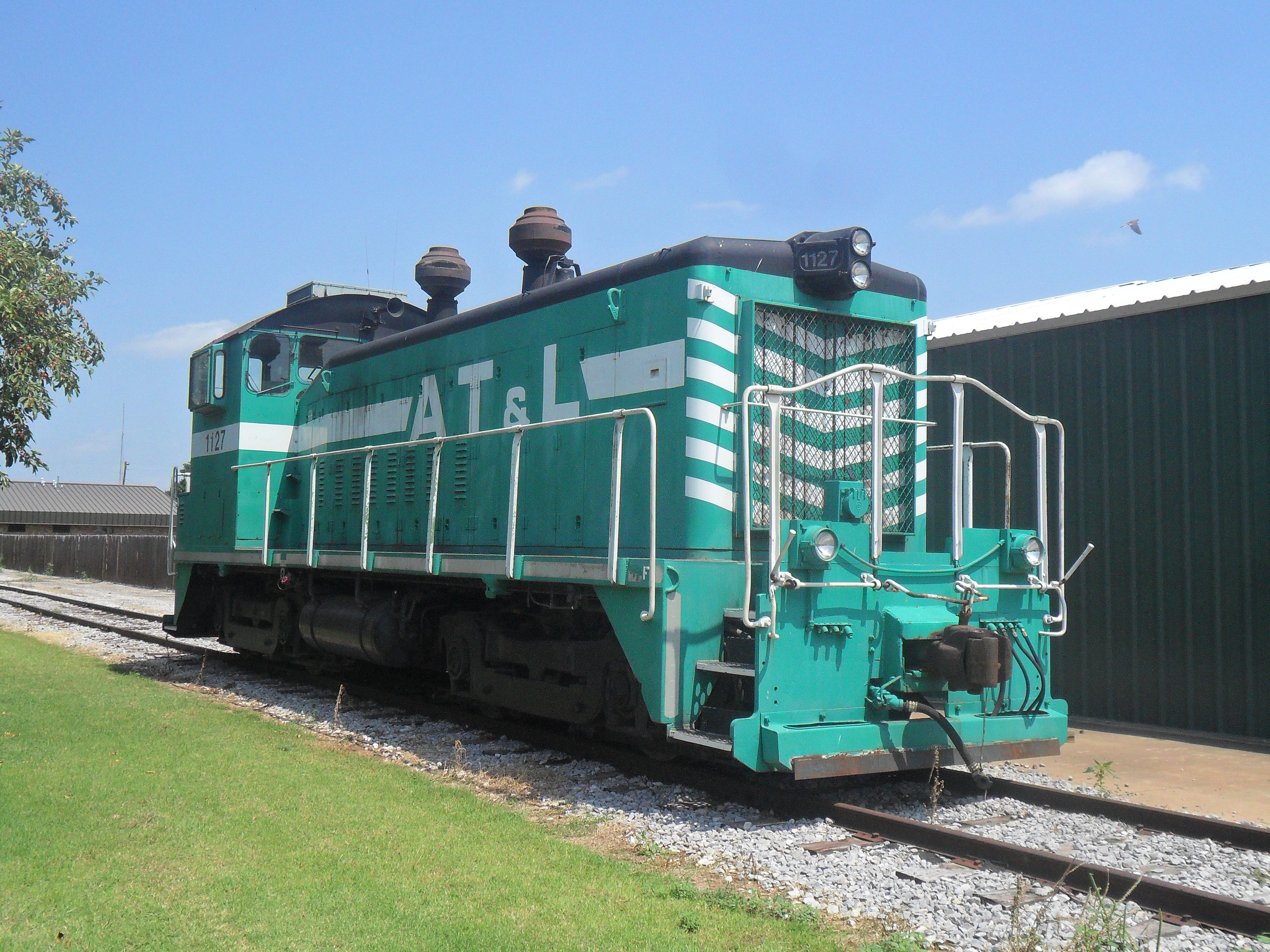
- The AT&L's EMD SW1200 switcher in Watonga

Overview
- Headquarters: Watonga, Oklahoma
- Reporting mark: ATLT
- Locale: Oklahoma
- Dates of operation: 1985–present

Technical
- Track gauge: 4 ft 8 1/2 in (1,435 mm)

The AT&L Railroad (reporting mark ATLT), also known as the Austin, Todd & Ladd Railroad, was started in May 1985 by Wheeler Brothers Grain Company operating about 49 miles (79 km) of former Chicago, Rock Island and Pacific Railroad (CRI&P) track in Oklahoma. It replaced the North Central Oklahoma Railway, which operated the track between 1983 and 1985. The ATLT is based in Watonga, Oklahoma. It is owned by Wheeler Brothers Grain Company. The railroad is named for Austin, Todd and Ladd Lafferty, grandsons of E. O. (Gene) Wheeler, who founded the railroad.

ATLT operates freight service from Watonga, Oklahoma to Geary to El Reno, Oklahoma 39.7 miles (63.9 km) and 9.6 miles (15.4 km) from Geary, Oklahoma to Bridgeport, Oklahoma. It also passes through Calumet and Greenfield. The line transports grain, fertilizer and agricultural products, with outbound shipments typically running in 110-car unit trains. Ultimately, the most prominent destination for the cargo is the US Gulf coast export market.

The Choctaw Northern Railroad built the Watonga-to-Geary segment in the 1901-1902 timeframe, before that railway was acquired by the Choctaw, Oklahoma and Gulf Railroad (CO&G). The Choctaw Coal & Railway Company built the east end of this rail line during the 1880s, then leased it in October 1894 to the CO&G. That route was then leased to the CRI&P in 1904. After CRI&P abandoned the line, it was acquired by the State of Oklahoma, and operated by the North Central Oklahoma Railway.

"Race the Rail" is an annual bicycle event that began in 2010, held during the Watonga Cheese Festival. Bikers ride 34-miles round trip from Watonga to Geary and back. A locomotive travels from Geary to Watonga traveling approximately 10 mph. The train and the bikes leave Watonga at the same time. The bikers ride along US Highway 270/281 (which is parallel and very close to the railroad tracks) from Watonga to Geary, and try to catch the train on the return trip.
