= Arkansas Valley and Western Railway =

Short line railway in Oklahoma

Overview
- Locale: Oklahoma
- Dates of operation: 1902–1907
- Successor: St. Louis-San Francisco Railway

Technical
- Track gauge: 4 ft 8 1/2 in (1,435 mm) standard gauge

The Arkansas Valley and Western Railway (AV&W) was built as a short line railroad operating within the U.S. state of Oklahoma. It was founded in 1902 to link the city of Tulsa with the main transcontinental line of the Atchison, Topeka and Santa Fe Railway (AT&SF) at Avard. The line was built in sections, initially from AV&W Jct. (West Tulsa) to Steen (Enid) during 1902-03. In 1904 it was extended westward to the junction with AT&SF at Avard. On July 19, 1907, the railroad was purchased by the St. Louis-San Francisco Railway (the "Frisco"), who operated it until November 21, 1980, when the Frisco was acquired by Burlington Northern Railroad.

== Geography ==
The AV&W was built westward from Tulsa, leaving the St. Louis, Missouri, to Fort Worth, Texas, Frisco line in West Tulsa. Following the valley of the Arkansas River, the line enters the Osage Hills and begins climbing the south bank of the river. In the early 1960s, a portion of the line was relocated uphill during the building of Keystone Dam. The reroute took the line out of the Arkansas and Cimarron River valleys. Leaving the Osage Hills the line continues westward along the Cimarron River, crossing it at Oilton, then angles northwest to Pawnee, intersecting the north-south former AT&SF (now BNSF Railway) line at Black Bear Junction near Perry. Continuing westward through the wheat belt, the line intersects with the former Chicago, Rock Island and Pacific Railroad (now Union Pacific Railroad), Denver, Enid and Gulf Railroad, and Blackwell, Enid and Southwestern Railway (now Grainbelt) at Enid, home of the third largest grain storage facilities in the world. The final section continues northwestward until the junction with the BNSF transcontinental line at Avard.

== Current operations ==
Intact intrastate line for BNSF, including BNSF-CSX intermodal traffic between the West Coast and the Southeast via the BNSF Cherokee sub from Tulsa to Springfield, Missouri, then the BNSF line to Birmingham, Alabama.
