= Guthrie Railway =

Former electrified tram service

Overview
- Headquarters: McAlester
- Locale: Oklahoma
- Dates of operation: 1905–1927

Technical
- Track gauge: 4 ft 8 1/2 in (1,435 mm) standard gauge
- Length: 7.65 miles (12.31 km)

The Guthrie Railway was an electrified trolley/streetcar service within the city of Guthrie, Oklahoma. Starting in 1905, the service ran until 1927.

== History ==
Guthrie, while founded as just a station stop along a Santa Fe Railway predecessor in 1887, became a full-blown town in 1889 immediately after the Oklahoma Land Run, and was selected as Territorial Capital of the Oklahoma Territory in 1890, a title it would hold until it became the capital of the newly-formed State of Oklahoma from 1907 to 1910. Regarding its transportation needs, the original franchise for trolley service within Guthrie was awarded to Oklahoma Traction Company, a predecessor of the Oklahoma City-based Oklahoma Railway Company (“ORC”) around 1903. The Guthrie Railway was separately organized in 1905, obtained the franchise, built its trackage, and made its first run on May 26, 1905. The electrified system at that point was about 6.5 miles, operated with 9 cars. The mileage varied over time, with the total near the end of 1908 being 7.65 miles, and the total near the end of 1910 being 7.50 miles.

With Guthrie's capital days behind it with the selection of Oklahoma City—which was six times larger—as state capital in 1910, land values in the city sank by 80%. In that environment, all of the outstanding bonds of the Guthrie Railway were purchased by ORC in 1913, and Guthrie Railway came under common control with ORC at that time; however, the two remained separate companies. This remained true in 1916 when ORC ran a 16-mile line from Edmund into Guthrie, completing a 31-mile trolley route between Oklahoma City and Guthrie. ORC utilized a small part of Guthrie Railway's rails and its trolley station a few years for that service, but did end up building its own station and discontinuing any usage of Guthrie Railway tracks. The ownership situation became more confusing in 1920 when Guthrie Railway leased cars from ORC showing the “Oklahoma Railway” name, but with no merger or takeover occurring between the companies. The Guthrie Railway ran until 1927, at which time the system was abandoned, with the power poles, wires and tracks on unpaved streets being removed. However, tracks on paved street were left in place and became in later years the subject of a lawsuit by the City of Guthrie against ORC for removal, said case being unsuccessful as the court confirmed the defunct Guthrie Railway was a separate company from ORC.

ORC for its part did not abandon its trolley route into Guthrie for about two more decades, with the last trolley running on November 9, 1946.
