= Clinton and Oklahoma Western Railroad =

Overview
- Locale: Oklahoma and Texas
- Dates of operation: 1908–1948
- Successor: Panhandle and Santa Fe Railway

Technical
- Track gauge: 4 ft 8 1/2 in (1,435 mm) standard gauge
- Length: 139 mi (224 km)

The Clinton and Oklahoma Western Railroad was a railway in southwestern Oklahoma and the Texas Panhandle, with a mainline eventually running from Clinton, Oklahoma, to Pampa, Texas, about 139 miles. The predecessor company was incorporated in 1908, and the railroad was merged out of existence in 1948.

== History ==
An entity called the Clinton and Oklahoma Western Railway Company was chartered November 10, 1908, for the stated purpose of constructing a railroad from Clinton, Oklahoma, to Guymon, Oklahoma, which is northwest of Clinton in the Oklahoma Panhandle, as well as building southeast from Clinton to the coal-mining town of Lehigh in southeastern Oklahoma. The railroad did build northwest from Clinton, but stopped at Strong City, Oklahoma in Roger Mills County in August of 1912. The townspeople of Cheyenne, Oklahoma, the Roger Mills County seat, were concerned about being bypassed by the railroad, and promptly chartered their own railway, the Cheyenne Short Line Railroad, on December 2, 1912, to run up the Washita River valley to connect with the larger railway at Strong City. That short line, after completion and a later reorganization as The Cheyenne Railroad Company, was leased to the Clinton and Oklahoma Western in 1917. On April 9, 1920, the Clinton and Oklahoma Western Railroad Company was organized, purchasing the rights of both the Clinton and Oklahoma Western Railway Company and The Cheyenne Railroad Company.

The railroad’s plans changed. The railway was eventually extended west to the Oklahoma/Texas state line, and a sister company, the Clinton-Oklahoma-Western Railroad Company of Texas, was chartered on July 30, 1927, to build the line from the border through Hemphill County, Texas, to the town of Pampa in Gray County, Texas. Before completion, however, both the Clinton and Oklahoma Western Railroad Company and its Texas affiliate were acquired by the Atchison, Topeka and Santa Fe Railway in June of 1928. The line was completed into Pampa in 1929, giving the railroad a mainline of about 84 miles of track from Clinton to the Oklahoma/Texas border, and about 55 miles from the border to Pampa. An 11 mile branch from the town of Heaton, Texas, to Coltexo, an oil camp three miles northeast of Lefors, Texas, was added in 1931.

The Santa Fe leased the railway to its Panhandle and Santa Fe Railway affiliate in 1931. That entity operated the line until taking it by merger on December 31, 1948.

At least some of this trackage has since been abandoned, including the original Clinton-to-Strong City route which was abandoned around 1981.
