= Choctaw, Newcastle and Western Railroad =

Short distance rail carrier in Oklahoma

Overview
- Locale: Oklahoma
- Dates of operation: 1907–1919/21

Technical
- Track gauge: 4 ft 8 1/2 in (1,435 mm) standard gauge
- Length: 3.3 mi (5.3 km)

The Choctaw, Newcastle and Western Railroad (“CN&W”) was a shortline rail carrier in Oklahoma. It acquired its 3.3 mile line near Alderson, Oklahoma in 1907, and sold the trackage sometime in the 1919-1921 timeframe.

== History ==
The Choctaw, Newcastle & Western Railroad Company was incorporated on January 31, 1907, under the laws of Oklahoma Territory. Its purpose was to acquire and operate an already-constructed line which had been built as a private industrial mine spur. The line extended from a connection with the Chicago, Rock Island and Pacific Railway just east of Alderson, and from there running 3.3 miles southwest to the mines. In 1910, the Annual Report on the Statistics of Railways in the United States from the Interstate Commerce Commission gave the length of the road as 2 miles owned and operated.

Separately, the McAlester Coal Fields Company was incorporated on March 7, 1912, with headquarters in McAlester. This company acquired the trackage of the CN&W to serve as an industrial spur to its own mines; but, sources differ as to whether this was in 1919 or 1921. The line has since been abandoned.
