= Texas and Oklahoma Railroad (1991) =

Overview
- Locale: Oklahoma, Arkansas
- Dates of operation: 1991–present

Technical
- Track gauge: 4 ft 8 1/2 in (1,435 mm) standard gauge
- Length: 351 miles (565 km) (originally)

The Texas and Oklahoma Railroad (TXOR), created in 1991, ran between Oklahoma and Texas on rail purchased from the Atchison, Topeka and Santa Fe Railway (AT&SF). Much of the trackage has since been sold or abandoned; however, the railway continues to exist as a shortline carrier operating between Sweetwater, Texas and Maryneal, Texas.

== History ==
The TXOR was incorporated April 22, 1991 as a Delaware corporation. It purchased two disconnected segments of track from the AT&SF, about 351 miles in total. The trackage was part of a line that had originally been laid around 1908 as part of the Kansas City, Mexico and Orient Railway, an attempt to link Kansas City, Missouri to its closest Pacific Ocean port, Topolobampo, Mexico. However, that line never got south of Texas.

The northern and far longer segment purchased by the TXOR ran from Cherokee, Oklahoma south through Fairview, Thomas, Clinton, Altus and into Elmer on the Oklahoma state line. Then it continued into Texas near Chillicothe to the Orient rail junction located just north of the town of Sweetwater. The southern segment ran from Shaufler, Texas south to Maryneal, Texas. In addition, the company obtained trackage rights between Orient Junction and Shaufler over AT&SF tracks, as well as rights in a trainyard in Sweetwater.

However, major changes quickly occurred. Part of the Oklahoma trackage, south from Westhom (near Thomas) to Elmer, about 102 miles, was purchased in January 1993 by the Oklahoma Department of Transportation, which then leased it to Farmrail to operate. Some of this trackage was purchased by Farmrail in September 2013, and some has continued to be operated by Farmrail in connection with its affiliated line, Grainbelt Corporation. The remaining Oklahoma tracks north to Cherokee were abandoned. In Texas, the segment from Chillicothe down to Sweetwater was abandoned in 1995. That left TXOR operating between Sweetwater and Maryneal.

This railway is not to be confused with the Texas and Oklahoma Railroad which was incorporated in 1902 and was consolidated December 12, 1903 with the Missouri, Kansas and Oklahoma Railroad Company (of 1901) to form the new Missouri, Kansas and Oklahoma Railroad Company (of 1903).
