= Maryneal, Texas =

Maryneal
- Unincorporated community
- Location within the state of Texas Maryneal (the United States)
- Coordinates: 32°14′07″N 100°27′01″W
- Country: United States
- State: Texas
- County: Nolan
- Elevation: 2,569 ft (783 m)
- Time zone: UTC-6 (Central (CST))
  - Summer (DST): UTC-5 (CDT)
- ZIP codes: 79535
- GNIS feature ID: 1341044

Maryneal is an unincorporated community in southern Nolan County, Texas, United States. It lies along FM 608 south of the city of Sweetwater, the county seat of Nolan County. Its elevation is 2,566 feet (782 m). Although Maryneal is unincorporated, it has a post office, with the ZIP code of 79535; the ZCTA for ZIP Code 79535 had a population of 181 at the 2000 census.

== History ==
Founded in 1907 along the Kansas City, Mexico and Orient Railway (and currently along the route of the Texas and Oklahoma Railroad), the community was named for one or more people; the source of its name is disputed. In its early history, the community was more significant than it is today: it won a significant minority of the votes in an election (losing to Sweetwater) to determine the county seat, and a post office was established in Maryneal by being moved from Decker.
