= Muskogee Southern Railroad =

Former railroad line

Overview
- Locale: Oklahoma
- Dates of operation: 1902–1904

Technical
- Track gauge: 4 ft 8 1/2 in (1,435 mm)
- Length: 37 mi (60 km)

The Muskogee Southern Railroad, which existed from 1902 to 1904, constructed only one line in its history. It built south from Muskogee, Oklahoma to the Canadian River, a distance of approximately 37 miles.

== History ==
The Muskogee Southern Railroad, starting in 1902, built south from Muskogee in the 1902-1903 timeframe through the towns of Warner and Porum to a point on the Canadian River. There, construction stopped due to lack of funding for a bridge. A map shows this distance as about 37 miles.

Meanwhile, the Midland Valley Railroad, chartered in 1903, built from Hartford, Arkansas into Oklahoma, getting to Bokoshe by 1904. That railway then decided it needed to reach Muskogee in order to exchange with the Missouri–Kansas–Texas Railroad. So, it completed its rails to the opposite bank of the Canadian River, acquired the Muskogee Southern assets, and built the missing bridge, allowing it to then run to Muskogee over the former Muskogee Southern trackage, arriving before the end of 1904.

Modern railroad maps do not show this trackage as still existing.
