= Poteau and Cavanal Mountain Railroad =

Former US railroad line

Overview
- Headquarters: Poteau, Oklahoma
- Locale: Oklahoma
- Dates of operation: 1923–1931

Technical
- Track gauge: 4 ft 8 1/2 in (1,435 mm)
- Length: 4.01 mi (6.45 km)

The Poteau and Cavanal Mountain Railroad was a railway which never operated, although it did at one time own 4.01 miles of track between Poteau, Oklahoma and what was then Witteville, Oklahoma. It acquired the line in 1923, but abandoned the same by 1931.

== History ==
As background, the line was built in the 1892-1893 timeframe by the Cavanal Coal and Mining Company. The Cavanal Coal, Coke and Railway acquired it on August 27, 1895. An entity called the Indianola Coal and Railway, incorporated in Texas, got it between July 21, 1889, and November 8, 1899, but transferred it about November 21, 1899 to the Fort Smith, Poteau and Western Railway Company, which was created in West Virginia on that date. When the line went into bankruptcy, the trackage was acquired by one D.J. Evans, who had coal mining interests in the area. He then created the Poteau and Western Railroad Company as a West Virginia corporation on December 24, 1915, and rolled the line into the new company on January 10, 1916.

The railroad at that point operated 3.415 miles of mainline between a junction with the St. Louis-San Francisco Railway at Poteau to a coal mine at or near Witteville, Oklahoma, but also owned 0.595 miles of yard tracks and sidings. Its traffic was hauling coal out of mines. However, the coal traffic ceased during 1918 because mining was suspended. The railroad managed to function for a while utilizing three-quarters of a mile of its track carrying bricks out of a brickyard, but all operations had ceased by January 1, 1919.

On February 24, 1923, the Poteau and Cavanal Mountain Railroad Company was incorporated in Oklahoma. Its organizers expected that high-grade semi-anthracite coal mining would be commencing from a new location at Cavanal Mountain, and so acquired the rail line from Mr. Evans in a stock swap. The Interstate Commerce Commission (ICC) approved the sale September 11, 1923.

However, the mining venture never materialized, so the railway was never put back in operation. After filing reports with the ICC for a number of years to the effect that the track still existed but was not being operated, the railway reported in 1931 that the road had been dismantled.

The location of Witteville, halfway up Cavanal Mountain, is now within the city limits of Poteau. Cavanal Mountain, more commonly known as Cavanal Hill with its eccentric claim of being the “world’s highest hill,” has long since ceased to be the subject of mining.
