= Wichita Falls and Northwestern Railway =

American railway

Overview
- Headquarters: Wichita Falls, Texas
- Locale: Oklahoma and Texas
- Dates of operation: 1910–1969

Technical
- Track gauge: 4 ft 8 1/2 in (1,435 mm)
- Length: 359.3 mi (578.2 km)

The Wichita Falls and Northwestern Railway, its affiliate the Northwestern Railway Company of Texas, and two subsidiaries collectively constructed a railway running from Wichita Falls, Texas through Altus, Oklahoma to Forgan, Oklahoma, with a branch running from Altus to Wellington, Texas. The network comprised 359.3 miles of track, and was collectively known as the Wichita Falls Route.

== History ==
The original plan was for a line extending north from Wichita Falls through Indian Territory to Englewood, Kansas. Toward that goal, two companies were chartered: the Wichita Falls and Northwestern Railway Company of Texas on September 26, 1906, to construct the seventeen-mile stretch from Wichita Falls to the Red River, and a few days later the Wichita Falls and Northwestern Railway Company to do the rest. However, plans changed and the northern segment was redirected to Frederick, Altus, Elk City, and on to Forgan in the Oklahoma Panhandle.

The directors also decided on a branch going west from Altus to Wellington in the Texas Panhandle. That branch was to be built by subsidiaries of the Wichita Falls and Northwestern Railway. The Wichita Falls and Wellington Railway Company of Texas constructed the portion in Texas, and the Altus, Wichita Falls and Hollis Railway Company did the Oklahoma portion.

The trackage to Altus, both from Wellington and from Wichita Falls, was completed in 1910. The continuation to Forgan was finished in 1912.

The stock of all the companies was acquired by the Missouri, Kansas and Texas Railway (MKT) system in 1911. The Wichita Falls and Northwestern Railway was merged into the MKT in 1923, with the Wichita Falls and Northwestern Railway Company of Texas following in 1969. The Wellington branch was merely leased by an MKT affiliate until that trackage was abandoned in 1958.

The remaining line to Forgan was cut back to Altus in 1973, leaving approximately 77 miles of trackage from Wichita Falls to Altus. In June 1982, the Oklahoma Department of Transportation (ODOT) acquired the 61.02 miles of trackage between Altus and the Oklahoma/Texas state line, while the UP ended up with the line from the border to Wichita Falls. In early 1991, the Wichita, Tillman and Jackson Railway (WTJR), a brand new company, separately leased both segments of the line. and started service January 14, 1991. The Lease on the Union Pacific segment was renewed in 2010, and again in 2016 for 10 years. The Oklahoma segment was purchased by WTJR from ODOT around the end of 2010.
