= Muskogee Electric Traction Company =

Former railroad line

Overview
- Headquarters: Muskogee, Oklahoma
- Locale: Oklahoma
- Dates of operation: 1904–1941

Technical
- Length: 31 mi (50 km)

The Muskogee Electric Traction Company (“Traction”) was an electrified streetcar line operating in and around Muskogee, Oklahoma from 1904 to 1941, with bus passenger service continuing under that name to 1958.

== History ==
Headquartered in Muskogee, Traction was incorporated May 14, 1904, under Act of Congress passed February 18, 1901. The company had ambitions to create a line from Muskogee to Tulsa to Drumright, and from Tulsa to Henryetta to Oklahoma City. However, the company started with only a five-mile line linking central Muskogee with the town’s Hyde Park on March 15, 1905, the latter being an entertainment destination built by the company itself in the same timeframe to encourage travel on its cars. The railway grew: by 1909 it operated sixteen motor cars plus four freight/mail cars running over fourteen miles of track in the Muskogee area, and in 1910 had 25 motor passenger cars and 2 mail/freight cars covering seventeen miles of electric track and carrying 2,298,083 passengers that year.

Separately, an entity called the Peoples Electric Railway was chartered March 7, 1911. It had ambitious ideas to create a 300-mile-long network linking Muskogee, Tulsa, Ft. Gibson, Claremore, Bartlesville, Wagoner and Oklahoma City. Its immediate goal was to run a line from Muskogee to Ft. Gibson, a distance of about 10 miles. This railway got started but, before completion, was acquired by Traction in October, 1912, which then completed the route.

Peak operation for Traction was reached in 1916, with the company having thirty-one miles of trackage including the Ft. Gibson line. But in the 1920s, as competition with the automobile picked up, the railway began to economize by purchasing twelve single-truck Birney Safety Cars, which could be operated by one person. Service areas in this timeframe included West Broadway, Fondulac, Hyde Park, East Okmulgee Avenue, The Fair Grounds, Midland Valley Shops, Monticello Addition, Elgin Avenue, and Reeves Addition lines, as well as the route to Ft. Gibson. Nevertheless, the Great Depression in the 1930’s caused further pressure, and passenger car operations were abandoned on March 9, 1933, to be replaced by busses which ran until 1958. In its last years, the railway discontinued the use of electric power and performed freight service by the use of two gasoline locomotives. All remaining rail lines were formally abandoned in 1941.
