= Texas and Oklahoma Railroad (1902) =

Railroad line in Oklahoma

The Texas and Oklahoma Railroad (1902)
Overview
- Locale: Oklahoma
- Dates of operation: 1902–1903

Technical
- Track gauge: 4 ft 8 1/2 in (1,435 mm) standard gauge
- Length: 40 miles (64 km)

The Texas and Oklahoma Railroad (T&O) existed briefly from its incorporation in mid-1902 to its consolidation with another line at the end of 1903. Its main accomplishment was to construct 40 miles of track northwest out of Coalgate, Oklahoma.

== History ==
The Texas and Oklahoma Railroad Company was incorporated on May 15, 1902, under the laws of the Oklahoma Territory. In that year, the railway constructed track from Coalgate to a point about 40 miles northwest of that town. On December 12, 1903, the railway was consolidated with the Missouri, Kansas and Oklahoma Railroad Company (of 1901) to form the new Missouri, Kansas and Oklahoma Railroad Company (of 1903). The latter built 78 miles of rails from the end of T&O's tracks into Oklahoma City. The physical assets of that entity were sold June 30, 1904 to the Missouri, Kansas and Texas Railway Company.

In subsequent history, while the Missouri, Kansas and Texas Railway Company was merged into the Missouri-Kansas-Texas Railway (Katy) in 1922, the trackage between Oklahoma City and Coalgate was not part of the reorganized company. Instead, that line was sold in 1923 to a Mr. H. R. Hudson, who took the trackage, together with leased trackage between Coalgate and Atoka, Oklahoma built by another affiliate, to create the Oklahoma City–Ada–Atoka Railway. That line become one of the Muskogee Roads in 1929, and was in turn sold to the Missouri Pacific Railway's Texas and Pacific Railway subsidiary in 1964. Said trackage was subsequently sold to the Atchison, Topeka and Santa Fe Railway. The entire line between Oklahoma City and Atoka was later abandoned.

This railway is not to be confused with another company of the same name, the Texas and Oklahoma Railroad incorporated in 1991. That line originally had trackage in both Oklahoma and Texas, but has since been shortened to a route between Sweetwater and Maryneal in Texas.
