= Wichita, Tillman and Jackson Railway =

Overview
- Headquarters: Fort Worth, Texas
- Reporting mark: WTJR
- Locale: Oklahoma and Texas
- Dates of operation: 1991–Present

Technical
- Track gauge: 4 ft 8 1/2 in (1,435 mm) standard gauge
- Length: 77 mi (124 km)

The Wichita, Tillman and Jackson Railway (reporting mark WTJR) is a shortline railroad subsidiary of the Rio Grande Pacific Corporation that operates in Oklahoma and Texas. The line for which it is named extends from Wichita Falls, Texas to just north of Altus, Oklahoma, through Wichita County, Texas, Tillman County, Oklahoma, and Jackson County, Oklahoma. It interchanges with the Union Pacific (UP) and BNSF at Wichita Falls, with Farmrail (FMRC), Stillwater Central Railroad (SLWC), and the BNSF at Altus, and with Grainbelt (GNBC) at Frederick, Oklahoma. It carries predominantly grain, chemicals and agricultural products.

== History ==
The line in question was completed by the Wichita Falls and Northwestern Railway (the Oklahoma portion) and the affiliated Wichita Falls and Northwestern Railway of Texas (the Texas portion) in 1910, and became part of the Missouri, Kansas and Texas Railway (MKT) system in 1911. The line was originally longer, but was cut back from Forgan, in the Oklahoma Panhandle, to Altus in 1973, leaving approximately 77 miles of trackage from Wichita Falls to Altus. In June 1982, the Oklahoma Department of Transportation (ODOT) acquired the 61.02 miles of trackage between Altus and the Oklahoma/Texas state line, while the UP ended up with the trackage from the border to Wichita Falls.

In early 1991, the WTJR, a brand new company, separately leased both segments of the line. Shortline service started January 14, 1991. The Lease on the Union Pacific segment was renewed in 2010, and again in 2016 for 10 years. The Oklahoma segment was purchased by WTJR from ODOT around the end of 2010.

In the beginning, the WTJR operated a second unconnected line, running from a connection with the UP at Waurika, Oklahoma to the town of Walters, Oklahoma, about 24 miles. This was a former Chicago, Rock Island and Pacific Railroad branch, leased to the Oklahoma, Kansas and Texas Railroad, an MKT subsidiary, after the Rock Island's abandonment in 1980. ODOT had acquired the property as part of a larger purchase in October 1982. The lines were leased to the UP, and in 1991 the Waurika-to-Walters segment was subleased by the UP to WTJR. UP acquired ownership of the line in 2012. But WTJR no longer operates the line: the WTJR website does not mention the line at all, while State of Oklahoma Railroad maps, which used to show it as a WTJR line now show it as a UP line.
