= Tulsa Street Railway =

Railroad in US state of Oklahoma

Overview
- Headquarters: Tulsa, Oklahoma
- Reporting mark: TSR
- Locale: Oklahoma; United States
- Dates of operation: 1906–1936

Technical
- Track gauge: 4 ft 8 1/2 in (1,435 mm) standard gauge
- Length: 21 miles (34 km)

The Tulsa Street Railway (TSR), a streetcar line in Tulsa, Oklahoma, was incorporated June 27, 1906, with construction beginning in early 1907. Its first run was made by a rented streetcar pulled by mules on May 27, 1907, essentially a stunt to fulfill a legal requirement to begin service by the statutorily-mandated date in order to avoid forfeiture of the streetcar franchise. Actual electric trolley revenue service began in July. Service was primarily in downtown as well as the area south of downtown. Eventually, TSR had service as far north as Pine St. from along Cheyenne, as far west as Rosedale along Easton Place, as far south as W. 18th St. from along Main, and as far east as what eventually became the University of Tulsa at S. College.

While TSR was Tulsa’s first streetcar system, it was soon joined by Oklahoma Union Traction, a line that eventually built all the way to Sapulpa and beyond. Another separate company, the Sand Springs Railway, linked up Tulsa and the city of Sand Springs. But despite the competition, the TSR at its peak around 1923 had about 21 miles of line and 52 cars, and even operated 23 busses to reach beyond its trackage.

Though the WWI years were very profitable, revenues began shrinking not long afterwards because of jitneys and automobiles, and the company went into receivership in 1925, being sold to a new group of investors in 1929 operating under the name of United Service. By 1933 United Service had also picked up the remaining Tulsa urban railways of Oklahoma Union Railway (formerly Traction), though not the Tulsa-Sapulpa interurban line which went to George Collins and later became the Tulsa–Sapulpa Union Railway. But things continued to decline, and United Service itself went bankrupt on July 17, 1935, by which time 16.9 miles of track remained operational. The business was sold on February 5, 1936 to National City Lines and its subsidiary the Tulsa City Lines, which promptly exited the streetcar business to concentrate on bus transportation.
