= Panhandle and Santa Fe Railway =

American railroad company

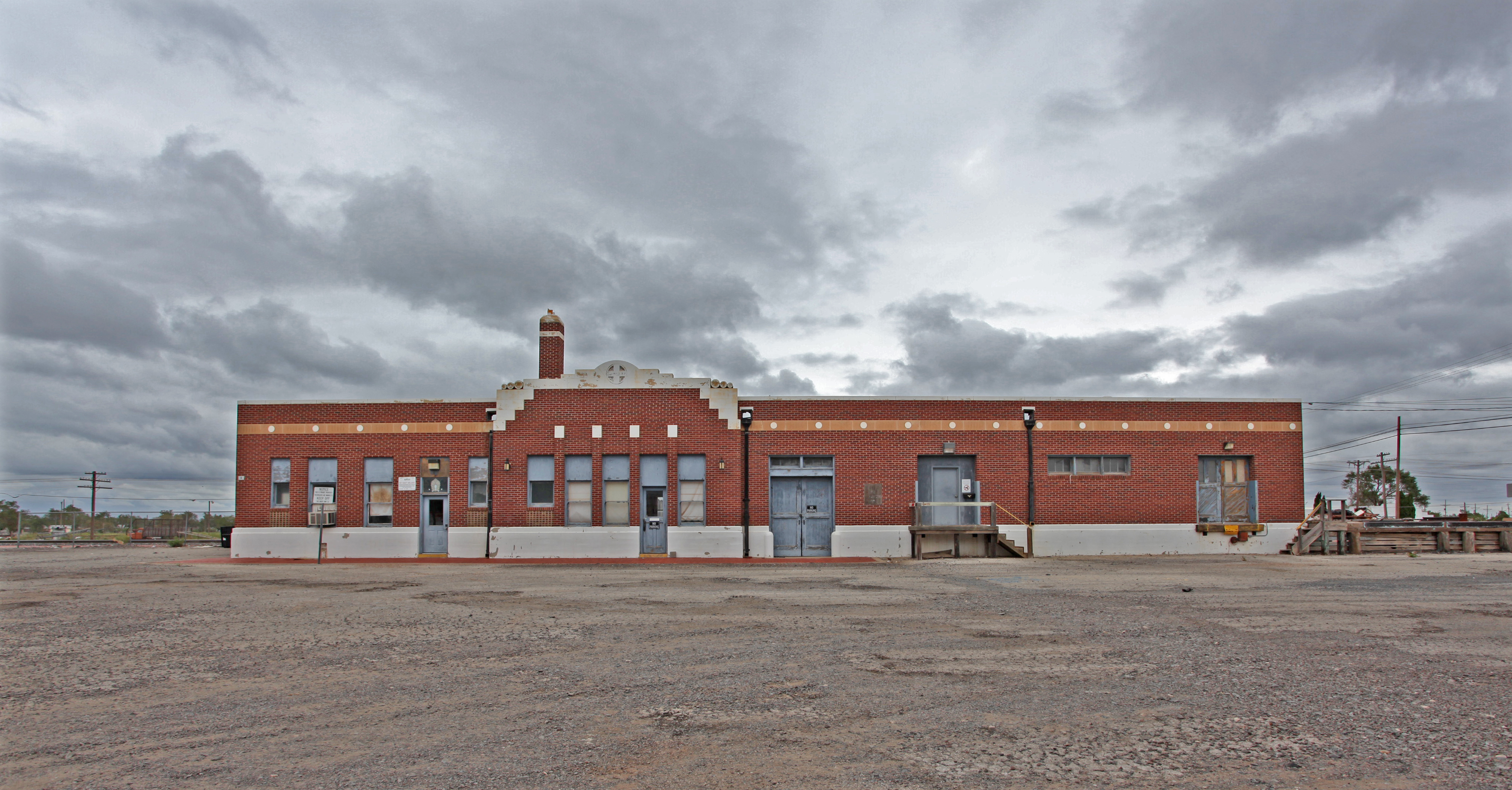
- Abandoned P&SF depot in Littlefield, Texas

Overview
- Headquarters: Amarillo, Texas
- Locale: New Mexico, Oklahoma, Texas
- Dates of operation: 1886–1965
- Predecessor: Southern Kansas Railway Company of Texas
- Successor: Atchison, Topeka and Santa Fe Railway

Technical
- Track gauge: 4 ft 8 1/2 in (1,435 mm) standard gauge

Other
- Website: Handbook of Texas

The Panhandle and Santa Fe Railway (P&SF) was an American rail transport company that was a subsidiary of the Atchison, Topeka and Santa Fe Railway (AT&SF), operating primarily in the Texas Panhandle.

== History ==
Chartered November 2, 1886 as The Southern Kansas Railway Company of Texas, the railroad was originally created to handle the Texas portion of the line started by the Southern Kansas Railway Company, another AT&SF affiliate, from Kiowa, Kansas across what was then Indian Territory to the Texas border. The Texas company then completed the thirty miles from the state line to Canadian, Texas on September 12, 1887, and the seventy miles from Canadian to Panhandle City, Texas on January 15, 1888. The trackage of a connecting line, the Panhandle Railway Company, was acquired at a foreclosure sale in 1898, extending the line from Panhandle City to Washburn, Texas, which allowed connection by way of the Fort Worth and Denver Railway from Washburn to Amarillo, Texas. However, the Panhandle City to Washburn trackage was abandoned in 1908 when the railroad built its own line directly from Panhandle City to Amarillo. At that point, the company had 125 miles of track.

In June 1914, the railway was renamed the Panhandle and Santa Fe Railway (P&SF), and kept expanding. The company added twenty-six miles from Panhandle to Borger, Texas in 1926, and ten miles from White Deer, Texas to Skellytown, Texas in 1927.

Other trackage was added, either through construction, purchase, lease, or by acquisition of trackage rights. This included a rail line from Amarillo on to Pecos, Texas which passed through eastern New Mexico. Other AT&SF properties, like the South Plains and Santa Fe between Lubbock, Texas and Crosbyton, Texas, were operated by the company, while properties like the North Texas and Santa Fe (incorporated in Texas in 1916; completed 85 miles from Shattuck, Oklahoma to Spearman, Texas in 1920) were leased to it.

In June 1928, the AT&SF purchased two affiliated companies: the Clinton and Oklahoma Western Railroad Company (COW), which had already completed a line from Clinton, Oklahoma to Strong City, Oklahoma and was building west to the Oklahoma/Texas border, and the Clinton-Oklahoma-Western Railroad Company of Texas (COW-T), which was then completing the line from the border west through Hemphill County, Texas to terminate at Pampa in Gray County, Texas. The AT&SF leased the completed line to P&SF in 1931, and both COW and COW-T were merged into the P&SF in December 1948.

At the end of 1933 the P&SF operated 1,879 miles of track, being 166 miles owned and the rest leased or operated under trackage rights.

The P&SF was merged into its parent AT&SF on August 1, 1965.

At least some of this trackage has since been abandoned, including the Clinton-to-Strong City route which was abandoned around 1981.
