= Webbers Falls Railroad =

Former railroad line

Overview
- Headquarters: Webbers Falls, Oklahoma
- Locale: Oklahoma
- Dates of operation: 1911–1918

Technical
- Track gauge: 4 ft 8 1/2 in (1,435 mm)
- Length: 11.6 mi (18.7 km)

The Webbers Falls Railroad (W.F.R.R.) was a shortline railway operating between the towns of Webbers Falls and Warner in the State of Oklahoma. Its predecessor began operations in 1911, and its line was dismantled by 1918.

== History ==
The creator of the line was incorporated in Oklahoma on December 9, 1909 as the Webbers Falls, Shawnee and Western Railroad. It constructed trackage between Webbers Falls and Warner during 1911, with the first train out of Webbers Falls being inaugurated amid great fanfare on October 1 of that year. The railroad promised four passenger trains daily, with two in each direction, as well as ample freight service. The line connected with the Midland Valley Railroad at Warner, giving Webbers Falls a connection to the outside world other than its traditional link, the Arkansas River. Aspirations included extending the line to Shawnee, Oklahoma, almost a hundred miles further west from Warner, at the very least.

But the railroad quickly ran into financial difficulty, allegedly because the Midland Valley did not extend the concessions that the minor road needed to operate. The line ceased operations in 1914. During this downtime, a justice of the peace at Webbers Falls bought an old railroad handcar, equipped it with a gasoline engine, and started running on the line without permission; but, operational problems with the trackage, encounters with another “pirate” user on the same line, and eventually a lawsuit from the railroad owners, caused that activity to cease.

Early 1915 saw successful negotiations for sale of the road. The Webbers Falls Railroad Company was incorporated in Oklahoma on June 8, 1916 to actually take title to the property. A snapshot of the W.F.R.R. in August 1916 showed an 11.6-mile standard gauge operation with its headquarters in Webbers Falls. The line was operating two coal-burning locomotives for freight, and two motor railcars for passengers.

The W.F.R.R. still had an eye for expansion, and actually received Congressional consent on October 5, 1917 to construct a bridge over the Arkansas River, which would have allowed the line to extend east from Webbers Falls to Gore, Oklahoma on the other side of that waterway. However, the line was never extended, and by 1918 was instead sold to well-known railroad scrapper Herman Sonken who tore up the rails, dismantled the engines and buildings, and eventually had bullets made out of the steel to help the Allied effort in World War I.
