= Cimarron River Valley Railway =

Railroad in Oklahoma, U.S.

Overview
- Locale: Oklahoma
- Dates of operation: 1985–1989

Technical
- Track gauge: 4 ft 8 1/2 in (1,435 mm)
- Length: 25.47 mi (40.99 km)

The Cimarron River Valley Railway (reporting mark CRVC) was a short-line railroad operating over a 25.47 mile route starting from a junction point known as Camp and continuing into the City of Cushing, all in the U.S. state of Oklahoma. The railroad began functioning January 1, 1985, and discontinued operations in April 1989.

== History ==
On November 28, 1983, following the shutdown of the Hudson Refinery in Cushing the previous year, the Atchison, Topeka and Santa Fe Railway (AT&SF) filed to abandon a railway segment commonly known as the Camp-Cushing line. This extended from a connection point on AT&SF's trackage near Pawnee known as Camp, and continued into the City of Cushing, a distance of 25.47 miles. Such abandonment would have left Cushing without rail service. In response, a local enterprise in the rail car cleaning and repair business known as Cushing Rail Car on September 12, 1984, created a subsidiary called the Cimarron River Valley Railway Company to instead lease the line from AT&SF and continue to run it. The new railroad officially began work on January 1, 1985. The line employed a small staff and at least four used EMD GP7 locomotives.

However, the railway ended up shutting down in April 1989, and receiving abandonment authority in July of that year. Because of this, the City of Cushing no longer has any rail connections.
