= Oklahoma Railway Company =

Overview
- Headquarters: Oklahoma City, Oklahoma
- Locale: Oklahoma, United States of America
- Dates of operation: 1904–1947

Technical
- Track gauge: 4 ft 8 1/2 in (1,435 mm) standard gauge
- Electrification: 600 V DC
- Length: 74 miles [119 km] (interurban routes)

The Oklahoma Railway Company (ORy) operated interurban lines to El Reno, Guthrie, and Norman, and several streetcar lines in Oklahoma City and the surrounding area from 1904 to 1947.

== Origins ==
ORy was incorporated in Oklahoma on June 14, 1904, under the name of the Oklahoma City Railway, and did not change its name until 1907. On July 1, 1904, ORy obtained all the properties of the 1902 Oklahoma City street railway firm Metropolitan Railway Company, consisting of about four miles (6.4 km) of track. The Oklahoma City and Suburban Railway, incorporated August 7, 1909, and its 25 miles of trackage was acquired by ORy on April 1, 1910. ORy continued building the OKC trolley network until 1931; the length varied, but at one point was about 28.7 miles (46.2 km). It also constructed interurban lines to other localities. In 1909 it built 3.1 miles (5.0 km) from OKC to Britton, Oklahoma; in 1910 it built 5.6 miles (9.0 km) from OKC to Moore, Oklahoma; in 1911 it constructed seven miles (11 km) from Britton on to Edmond, Oklahoma; in 1913 it constructed nine miles (14 km) from Moore on to Norman, Oklahoma; and, in 1916 it built 16 miles (26 km) from Edmund on to Guthrie, Oklahoma.

== El Reno Interurban Company ==
El Reno’s trolley system started out in 1902 at a mere two miles, served by a single gasoline-powered railcar. However, things changed after the El Reno Interurban Company (“ERI”) was incorporated on July 2, 1908. Obtaining the earlier city trolley line, the ERI electrified it in December 1908. But the ERI had a bigger horizon: it constructed a line between El Reno and OKC, building the first 13 miles (21 km) in 1909 from OKC to Yukon, Oklahoma, and finishing in 1911 with 12.4 miles (20.0 km) from Yukon to El Reno.

ORy bought the ERI on August 1, 1911, and ERI’s separate identity was quickly phased out. On December 3, 1911, ORy began running between El Reno and Oklahoma City every hour, while maintaining the El Reno street trolleys as one every half hour.

== Oklahoma City Junction Railway ==
An independent entity called the Oklahoma City Junction Railway was incorporated in Oklahoma on June 10, 1909. Its primary purpose was to operate a terminal (principally consisting of stock pens) in the stockyards district of OKC, but the project included 1.724 miles (2.775 km) of mainline and 3.779 miles (6.082 km) of yard tracks and sidings, and was built between April and October 1910. It was operated with equipment and forces of other railways, for example the St. Louis-San Francisco Railway (“Frisco”) ran it from date of completion to March 31, 1917. It interchanged with the Frisco, and later the Oklahoma Belt Railroad. On May 1, 1929, all of its assets were leased to ORy.

== Oklahoma Belt Railroad ==
Separately, the Oklahoma Belt Railroad (“OBR”) was incorporated January 11, 1917, with its main office in Oklahoma City. Between February and August of that year, construction was done on its behalf of 3.848 miles (6.193 km) of main tracks plus 1.010 miles (1.625 km) of yard tracks and sidings for 4.858 miles (7.818 km) total, to provide switching and terminal services between the Missouri–Kansas–Texas Railroad (“Katy”) terminal and the Oklahoma City stockyards. The construction was actually done by the Katy, and the OBR trackage was both leased to and operated by the Katy from its first day.

The OBR line was later leased to ORy on April 20, 1928 (effective May 1, 1929) as part of ORy’s push to de-emphasize passengers and develop a more serious carload freight business. The ORy subsequently became the OBR’s sole owner, but all ORy freight operations were discontinued August 16, 1944.

== Guthrie Railway ==
While ORy originally obtained the franchise to build a streetcar line in Guthrie, the independent Guthrie Railway bought the franchise from ORy and constructed the system there. By 1913, the two companies were still separate but under common control. In 1916 ORy completed a line into Guthrie, linking all the way to Oklahoma City. The Guthrie Railway was abandoned in 1927, but the ORy line into Guthrie continued at that time.

== Services ==
In 1942, Oklahoma Railway Company operated three interurban lines, five streetcar lines, and seventeen bus routes.

Number	Name	Route
30	Belle Isle	Classen, Olie, Broadway, Main
31	Capitol	Lottie, 21st, Lindsay, 13th, Broadway, Main, Olie
32	Exchange	Exchange, Reno, Walker
33	Fair Grounds	8th, Harrison, Broadway
34	Linwood	Drexel, 12th, Pennsylvania, Virginia, Main, loop via Broadway, Grand, Walker
	El Reno	
	Norman	
	Guthrie	

== Demise ==
As the 1920’s brought more competition from automobiles, ORy entered receivership in December 1924. It emerged from that in December 1927, only to land in receivership again in September 1939, when it was handed off to the Federal government to run. A resurgence was brought on by the transportation needs of World War II, but revenues plummeted thereafter. New owners arriving in 1945 quickly put an end to things. For instance, both the OKC–El Reno and OKC-Guthrie routes were abandoned in November of 1946. By 1947, the trains had mostly been sold to Mexico and the other assets disposed of. However, 2 are stored in Elk City, Oklahoma as of 2024, #120, built in 1929, and #226, built in 1927, both stored on E 3rd Street
