= Enid and Anadarko Railway =

Oklahoma railroad company

Overview
- Headquarters: Enid, Oklahoma
- Locale: Oklahoma
- Dates of operation: 1901–1903
- Successor: Chicago, Rock Island and Pacific Railway

Technical
- Track gauge: 4 ft 8 1/2 in (1,435 mm) standard gauge

The Enid and Anadarko Railway Company' was incorporated on March 9, 1901 under the laws of the territory of Oklahoma by M.A. Low, J.C. Marshall, I.G. Conkling, H.D. Crossley and S.H. Thompson. The Chicago, Rock Island and Pacific Railway purchased the Enid and Anadarko Railway on October 21, 1903.

In 1901, the company built 60 miles of railroad from Enid, Oklahoma to Watonga, Oklahoma. In 1902, this was extended to Anadarko, Oklahoma, an additional 45 miles. The company also built 41 miles of railroad for the Lawton, Oklahoma to Waurika, Oklahoma line.

== Enid and Anadarko Act ==
The Enid and Anadarko Act (32 Stat. 43) was approved by Congress on February 28, 1902. It granted the right of way through Oklahoma and Indian Territories for the Enid and Anadarko Railway Company.
