= Ozark and Cherokee Central Railway =

Former railroad line

Overview
- Locale: Oklahoma and Arkansas
- Dates of operation: 1899–1907

Technical
- Track gauge: 4 ft 8 1/2 in (1,435 mm)
- Length: 144 mi (232 km)

The Ozark and Cherokee Central Railway (O&CC) was formed under the name of the North Arkansas & Western Railway in 1899. At its maximum, it owned a standard gauge, single track line running between Fayetteville, Arkansas and Okmulgee, Oklahoma. Its assets were merged into the St. Louis and San Francisco Railway (Frisco) in 1907.

== History ==
The railroad may be said to have originated at a public meeting among Fayetteville boosters on September 25, 1888, which was called to discuss building more tracks into Fayetteville to connect to the recently arrived Frisco. Toward this goal the North Arkansas & Western Railway Company was officially incorporated in Arkansas on November 29, 1899. The initial intent was to run west from Fayetteville into the Illinois River valley, to service the timber and fruit-growing areas there. However, it only graded 12 miles of right-of-way from Fayetteville to Prairie Grove, Arkansas.

Control of the line passed from the Fayetteville boosters to H. W. Seaman of Clinton, Iowa and the Kenefick Construction Co. of Kansas City, Missouri in February of 1901, before rail construction had even started. On April 19, 1901, the new owners changed the name to the Ozark and Cherokee Central Railway Company. The next goal was to build to Tahlequah, Oklahoma through Westville, Oklahoma, the latter having a connection with the Kansas City Southern Railway. Tahlequah was reached on August 2, 1902. The extension into Fort Gibson was completed on December 10, 1902.

The line needed a bridge over the Arkansas River, and received permission to build one directly from the U.S. Congress. The task was delegated to the separate Muskogee City Bridge Company, which was incorporated by Act of Congress on June 15, 1901. That company built a railroad bridge across the Arkansas at Muskogee, Oklahoma during the 1901–1903 timeframe. Meanwhile, another railroad called the Shawnee, Oklahoma and Missouri Coal and Railway Company, which was incorporated under the laws of Oklahoma Territory on February 28, 1899, built a line between Muskogee and Okmulgee in the 1902-1903 timeframe, arriving in Okmulgee on March 13, 1903. The assets of both of those entities were officially acquired by the O&CC on March 16, 1903.

Along with O&CC’s own completion of the line from Fort Gibson utilizing the bridge, which arrived in Muskogee on February 1, 1903, the purchases gave the O&CC a standard gauge, single track railroad extending from Fayetteville to Okmulgee, about 144 miles in length. Equipment consisted of three 4-4-0 locomotives, one coach, one coach/baggage combination, and a variety of freight equipment.

In January of 1902, the Frisco had been granted an option to purchase all the outstanding O&CC stock, and the Frisco executed that option in November of 1902. However, the O&CC continued to exist under Frisco ownership until July 15, 1907, when its assets were formally deeded to the Frisco, where it became the Muskogee Subdivision of the Red River Division.

In subsequent history, most of the line east of Fort Gibson was abandoned by the Frisco in July 1942. The bridge across the Arkansas was removed by 1968 as part of the McClellan–Kerr Arkansas River Navigation System. The rest of the line disappeared between 1979 and 1983.
