= Tulsa–Sapulpa Union Railway =

Railroad in US state of Oklahoma

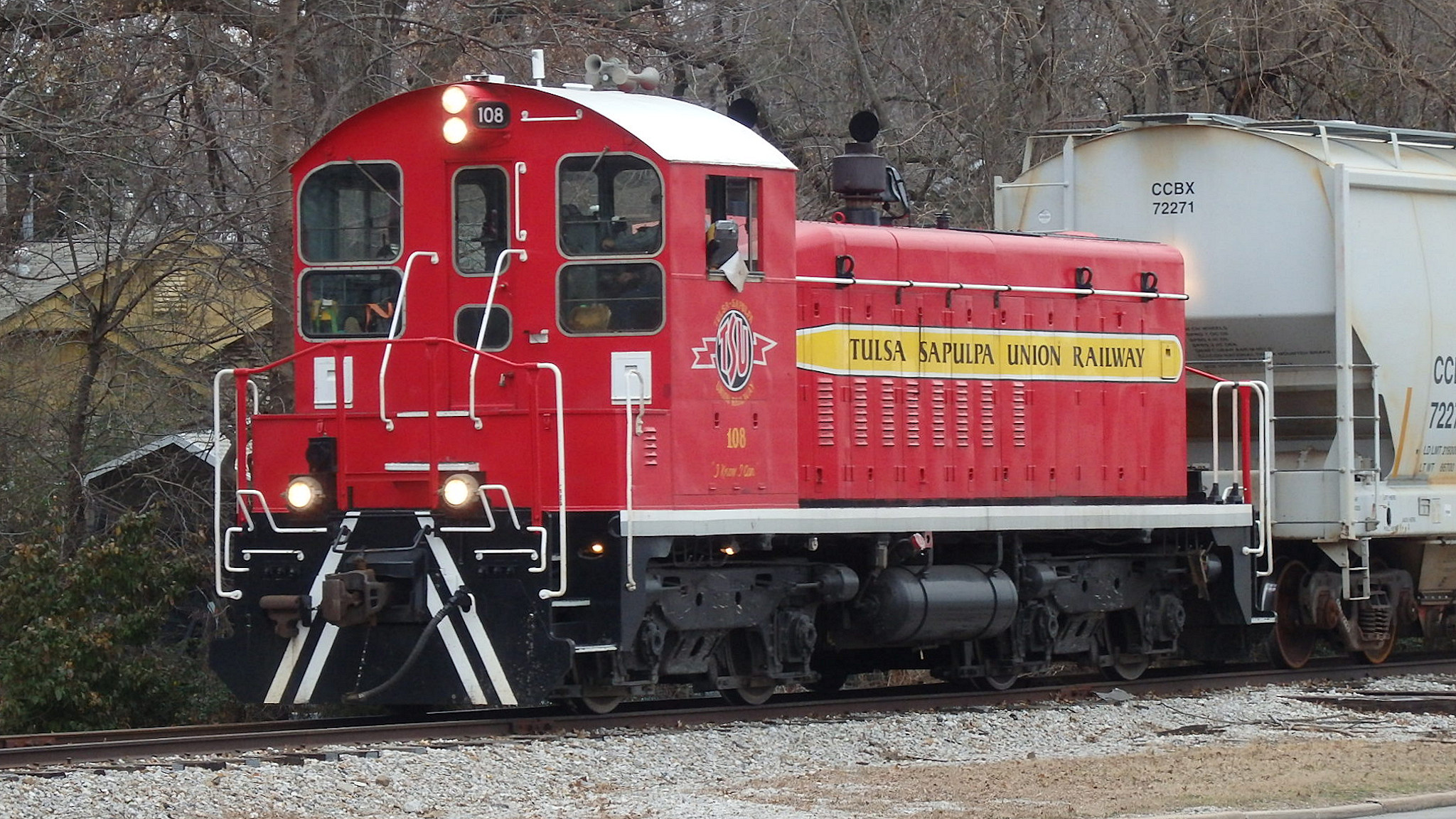
- Tulsa-Sapulpa Union Railway's EMD SW1200 diesel locomotive #108 in 2020

Overview
- Headquarters: Sapulpa, Oklahoma
- Reporting mark: TSU
- Locale: Oklahoma; United States
- Dates of operation: 1907–present

Technical
- Track gauge: 4 ft 8 1/2 in (1,435 mm) standard gauge
- Length: 22.9 miles (36.9 km)

Tulsa–Sapulpa Union Railway Company, L.L.C. (reporting mark TSU) is a Class III shortline rail carrier which operates freight service between Tulsa, Oklahoma and Sapulpa, Oklahoma over 10 miles of track known as the Sapulpa Lead, and which also leases and operates a 12.9 mile section of Union Pacific track known as the Jenks Industrial Lead between Tulsa and Jenks, Oklahoma. The line connects with two Class I railroads, being the Union Pacific at Tulsa and the BNSF at Sapulpa, and additionally connects to its fellow Class III shortline, the Sand Springs Railway, in Tulsa. It is owned by the Collins Family Trust. Major customers on the Sapulpa Lead include Technotherm, Prescor, and Ardagh Glass, and on the Jenks Industrial Lead, the HF Sinclair oil refinery, Kentube, Word Industries, Pepsi Cola, and Kimberly-Clark.

== History ==
The company started in 1907 as the Sapulpa & Interurban Railway, running electric trolley cars to carry workers between Sapulpa and various plants along the Arkansas River. In 1908 it opened a route connecting Sapulpa to the towns of Kiefer, Glenpool, and Mounds in Oklahoma, to transport oil field workers to the Glenn Pool and Sapulpa-area oil fields. Running through sparsely populated areas and carrying little freight, the line was bankrupt by 1912, but merged with another interurban line, the Oklahoma Union Railway, in an attempt to help both. Oklahoma Union served Tulsa and communities to the southwest, and had unsuccessfully tried to reach Sapulpa. After a second bankruptcy in 1917, the combined company was again reorganized as the Sapulpa Electric Interurban Railway, and in 1918 completed the connection between Sapulpa and Tulsa, giving it a total route of 25 miles of track. The Sapulpa-Mounds line was abandoned in 1928, and the company went bankrupt again in 1929. In 1933, passenger service ended in favor of freight, and by 1934 or 1935 George Collins bought the line to service his glass plant in Sapulpa. His line was incorporated as the Sapulpa Union Railway, with the name later changing to the Tulsa–Sapulpa Union Railway around 1943.

Freight trains were operated by two electric boxcabs until 1955. The railroad purchased two Baldwin-Westinghouse electric locomotives from the Sand Springs Railway as replacements when that company ended electric operations that year. Electric freight trains continued on the Tulsa–Sapulpa Union Railway until 1960, when the wires were taken down and diesel locomotives took over, including a Davenport Locomotive Works switcher and two EMD SW1s. A third SW1 was purchased later, followed by an EMD SW7 and an EMD SW9. These were joined by an EMD SW1200 by 2001.

== Operations ==
About 60% of rail traffic is inbound to customers on the line, while 40% of rail traffic is outbound.

The railway operates 5 days a week, through two locomotives with one shift each, utilizing five employees. Its offices are in Sapulpa, where a preserved interurban trolley, the Maggie M, is on display.

The current lease agreement with Union Pacific on the Jenks Industrial Lead was signed December 21, 2018 for an initial five-year term, which may be extended by TSU for an additional 15 years.
