= Sapulpa and Oil Field Railroad =

Overview
- Locale: Oklahoma
- Dates of operation: 1915–1917

Technical
- Track gauge: 4 ft 8 1/2 in (1,435 mm)
- Length: 9 mi (14 km)

The Sapulpa and Oil Field Railroad (S&OF) was a shortline railway which was constructed by 1915 or 1916 from the oil boomtown of Depew, Oklahoma to the newer boomtown of Shamrock, Oklahoma, about 9 miles. Despite the name, the line never came close to the city of Sapulpa, Oklahoma, which was far to the northeast.

Depew already had rail service from the St. Louis-San Francisco Railway (Frisco). But when the S&OF bypassed Shamrock by three-quarters of a mile, the arrival of that railroad was important enough that the townspeople of Shamrock relocated their establishments to the southeast to be closer to the tracks. The railway carried both passengers and freight traffic related to development of the Shamrock oil field.

The Frisco acquired the railroad and began operating it effective July 1, 1917. Shamrock began declining in the mid-1920's when oil production shifted to other areas, and the site is now considered a ghost town. The rail line was abandoned in October 1957.
