= Jennings, Oklahoma =

- Town
- Location of Jennings, Oklahoma
- Coordinates: 36°10′56″N 96°34′09″W
- Country: United States
- State: Oklahoma
- County: Pawnee

Area
  - Total: 0.55 sq mi (1.43 km^{2})
  - Land: 0.55 sq mi (1.43 km^{2})
  - Water: 0 sq mi (0.00 km^{2})
- Elevation: 935 ft (285 m)

Population (2020)
  - Total: 280
  - Density: 507/sq mi (195.9/km^{2})
- Time zone: UTC-6 (Central (CST))
  - Summer (DST): UTC-5 (CDT)
- ZIP code: 74038
- Area codes: 539/918
- FIPS code: 40-37850
- GNIS feature ID: 2412803

Jennings is a town in Pawnee County, Oklahoma, United States. The population was 280 as of the 2020 Census.

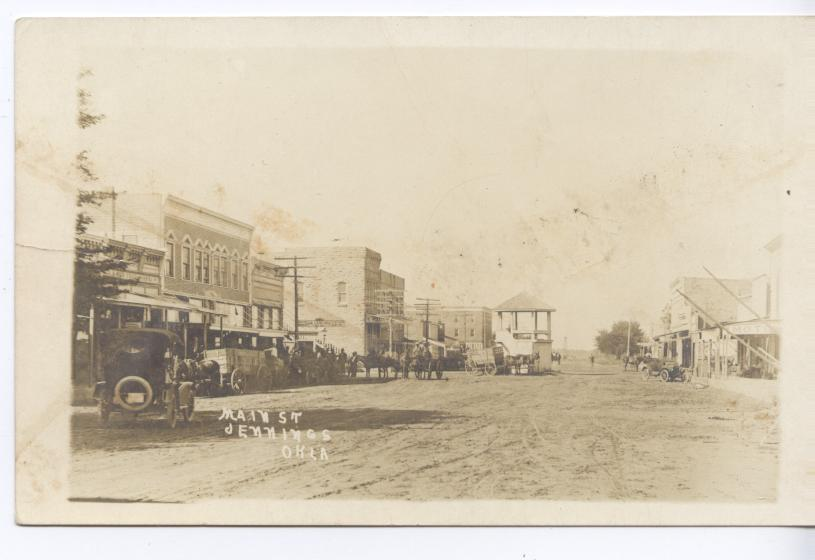
Jennings, Oklahoma

== Geography ==
According to the United States Census Bureau, the town has a total area of 0.6 square miles (1.6 km^{2}), all land.

== Demographics ==
Historical population
Census	Pop.	Note	%±
1910	361		—
1920	910		152.1%
1930	653		−28.2%
1940	453		−30.6%
1950	338		−25.4%
1960	306		−9.5%
1970	338		10.5%
1980	395		16.9%
1990	381		−3.5%
2000	373		−2.1%
2010	363		−2.7%
2020	280		−22.9%
U.S. Decennial Census

=== 2020 census ===
As of the 2020 census, Jennings had a population of 280. The median age was 40.0 years. 27.5% of residents were under the age of 18 and 20.0% of residents were 65 years of age or older. For every 100 females there were 107.4 males, and for every 100 females age 18 and over there were 95.2 males age 18 and over.

0.0% of residents lived in urban areas, while 100.0% lived in rural areas.

There were 106 households in Jennings, of which 34.0% had children under the age of 18 living in them. Of all households, 50.9% were married-couple households, 15.1% were households with a male householder and no spouse or partner present, and 24.5% were households with a female householder and no spouse or partner present. About 25.5% of all households were made up of individuals and 11.3% had someone living alone who was 65 years of age or older.

There were 168 housing units, of which 36.9% were vacant. The homeowner vacancy rate was 2.2% and the rental vacancy rate was 38.1%.

Racial composition as of the 2020 census
Race	Number	Percent
White	222	79.3%
Black or African American	2	0.7%
American Indian and Alaska Native	20	7.1%
Asian	0	0.0%
Native Hawaiian and Other Pacific Islander	0	0.0%
Some other race	4	1.4%
Two or more races	32	11.4%
Hispanic or Latino (of any race)	3	1.1%

=== 2000 census ===
As of the census of 2000, there were 373 people, 140 households, and 102 families residing in the town. The population density was 671.6 inhabitants per square mile (259.3/km^{2}). There were 173 housing units at an average density of 311.5 per square mile (120.3/km^{2}). The racial makeup of the town was 84.72% White, 11.80% Native American, 0.27% Pacific Islander, and 3.22% from two or more races. Hispanic or Latino of any race were 0.27% of the population.

There were 140 households, out of which 33.6% had children under the age of 18 living with them, 59.3% were married couples living together, 8.6% had a female householder with no husband present, and 27.1% were non-families. 25.7% of all households were made up of individuals, and 11.4% had someone living alone who was 65 years of age or older. The average household size was 2.66 and the average family size was 3.17.

In the town, the population was spread out, with 27.9% under the age of 18, 8.3% from 18 to 24, 31.4% from 25 to 44, 18.5% from 45 to 64, and 13.9% who were 65 years of age or older. The median age was 35 years. For every 100 females, there were 88.4 males. For every 100 females age 18 and over, there were 85.5 males.

The median income for a household in the town was $31,563, and the median income for a family was $36,250. Males had a median income of $28,295 versus $24,375 for females. The per capita income for the town was $13,071. About 10.6% of families and 15.0% of the population were below the poverty line, including 21.4% of those under age 18 and 8.7% of those age 65 or over.
