= West Tulsa Belt Railway =

Railway in Oklahoma, USA

Overview
- Headquarters: Tulsa, Oklahoma
- Locale: Oklahoma
- Dates of operation: 1910–1922

Technical
- Track gauge: 4 ft 8 1/2 in (1,435 mm)
- Length: 2.142 mi (3.447 km)

The West Tulsa Belt Railway (WTB) was an odd railroad for multiple reasons. It had only about two miles of track, located in or about West Tulsa, Oklahoma. It had no mainline, instead consisting of just sidetracks and yards. And, it had no locomotives, rolling stock, or employees to operate it, instead being run from its inception by another railroad's equipment and personnel.

== History ==
The railway was organized July 1, 1909. Its president and stockholder was W.E. Hawley of Hawley Engineering Company. Sources differ as to the purpose of the line: one says it was to connect the St. Louis–San Francisco Railway (Frisco) with the Midland Valley Railroad; another says it was just to connect the Frisco to the privately owned tracks of The Texas Company. The Texas Company, later known as Texaco, already had oil storage facilities in West Tulsa, and was beginning work on a major refinery in February 1910. In any event, after construction of the WTB had started in September 1909, the stock of the company was purchased the following year by Joseph S. Cullinan, president and founder of The Texas Company, who continued construction. He in turn sold his stock to the Frisco. The Frisco completed the line on November 13, 1910. Under the terms of a written operating agreement, the trackage was run by the Frisco with its own equipment and personnel from the first day.

Following a takeover of operation of the railway by the US Railroad Administration during the First World War, Frisco was given permission to acquire the railroad's line and assets by order of the Oklahoma Corporation Commission on August 5, 1922. The Texaco refinery in West Tulsa, later sold to Sinclair Oil and eventually ending up with HF Sinclair, continues in operation today.
