= Timeline of Class I railroads (1930–1976) =

| Timeline of Class I railroads |
1910–1929 • 1930–1976 • 1977–present

The following is a brief history of the North American rail system, mainly through major changes to Class I railroads, the largest class by operating revenue.

1930

- The Gulf, Mobile and Northern Railroad acquires control of the New Orleans Great Northern Railroad.
- January 1: The Illinois Terminal Company leases the Alton and Eastern Railroad (not Class I), a short piece of the former Chicago, Peoria and St. Louis Railroad.
- January 10: The Duluth, Missabe and Northern Railway leases the Duluth and Iron Range Railroad.
- January 31: Canadian National Railway subsidiary Central Vermont Railway is reorganized without change of name after a receivership beginning December 12, 1927.
- February 1: The New York Central Railroad leases subsidiaries Cincinnati Northern Railroad, Cleveland, Cincinnati, Chicago and St. Louis Railway, Evansville, Indianapolis and Terre Haute Railway, and Michigan Central Railroad.
- April 1: The Delaware and Hudson Railroad begins operating the former property of the Delaware and Hudson Company.
- April 14: Louisiana and Arkansas Railway subsidiary Louisiana Railway and Navigation Company of Texas is renamed Louisiana, Arkansas and Texas Railway.
- April 30: The Chesapeake and Ohio Railway acquires the property of subsidiary Hocking Valley Railway.
- July 1: The Pennsylvania Railroad leases subsidiary West Jersey and Seashore Railroad.
- July 7: The Trinity and Brazos Valley Railway, in receivership since June 16, 1914, and under joint control by the Colorado and Southern Railway (Chicago, Burlington and Quincy Railroad system) and Chicago, Rock Island and Pacific Railway since 1906, leaves receivership and is renamed Burlington-Rock Island Railroad.

1931

- July 19: Baltimore and Ohio Railroad subsidiary Alton Railroad begins operating the former Chicago and Alton Railroad, which had entered receivership on August 30, 1922.

1932

- January 1: The Baltimore and Ohio Railroad begins operating the Buffalo, Rochester and Pittsburgh Railway and Buffalo and Susquehanna Railroad under lease, shortly after acquiring control.
- February 1: The New York Central Railroad acquires the property of the Ulster and Delaware Railroad, in receivership since August 16, 1931.
- April 14: The Southern Pacific Company gains control of the St. Louis Southwestern Railway and subsidiary St. Louis Southwestern Railway of Texas.

1933

- February 1: Southern Pacific Company subsidiary San Diego and Arizona Eastern Railway acquires the property of the San Diego and Arizona Railway, half-owned by the SP.
- July 1: New Gulf, Mobile and Northern Railroad lessor New Orleans Great Northern Railway acquires the property of GM&N subsidiary New Orleans Great Northern Railroad.
- July 15: Reading Company subsidiary Atlantic City Railroad is renamed Pennsylvania-Reading Seashore Lines and leases the West Jersey and Seashore Railroad from the Pennsylvania Railroad, which acquires a 2/3 share of the new company.
- December: The Baltimore and Ohio Railroad acquires the property of lessor Coal and Coke Railway.

1934

- The property of the Louisiana Railway and Navigation Company is conveyed to lessee Louisiana and Arkansas Railway.
- February 1: The Kansas City Southern Railway leases the property of Texas subsidiary Texarkana and Fort Smith Railway located within Texas. (The remainder, in Arkansas, was already operated under lease by the KCS.)
- June 30: The Galveston, Harrisburg and San Antonio Railway, Houston East and West Texas Railway, Houston and Texas Central Railroad, Louisiana Western Railroad, Morgan's Louisiana and Texas Railroad and Steamship Company, and San Antonio and Aransas Pass Railway merge into lessee Texas and New Orleans Railroad, a subsidiary of the Southern Pacific Company.
- October 1: The Chesapeake and Ohio Railway acquires the properties of lessor Chesapeake and Ohio Railway of Indiana.

1935

- January 8: The property of the bankrupt Maryland and Delaware Seacoast Railway (not Class I), successor to part of the Maryland, Delaware and Virginia Railway, is split among Pennsylvania Railroad subsidiaries Baltimore and Eastern Railroad and Delaware, Maryland and Virginia Railroad.
- April 16: The Missouri and Arkansas Railway begins operating the former Missouri and North Arkansas Railway, in receivership since May 5, 1927.
- June 21: The property of the Arizona and New Mexico Railway is conveyed to lessee El Paso and Southwestern Railroad, itself leased to the Southern Pacific Company.

1936

- January 1: The Union Pacific Railroad leases subsidiaries Oregon Short Line Railroad, Oregon-Washington Railroad and Navigation Company, Los Angeles and Salt Lake Railroad, and St. Joseph and Grand Island Railway.
- July 16: The Springfield, Havana and Peoria Railroad, successor to part of the Chicago, Peoria and St. Louis Railroad, merges into lessee Chicago and Illinois Midland Railway.

1937

- January 22: The Alton and Eastern Railroad (not Class I), a short piece of the former Chicago, Peoria and St. Louis Railroad, is merged into lessee Illinois Terminal Company (along with other subsidiaries), and simultaneously the parent is renamed Illinois Terminal Railroad.
- March 1: The Atchison, Topeka and Santa Fe Railway buys the Fort Worth and Rio Grande Railway from the St. Louis-San Francisco Railway and leases it to subsidiary Gulf, Colorado and Santa Fe Railway.
- July 1: The Duluth, Missabe and Northern Railway merges with lessor Spirit Lake Transfer Railway to form the Duluth, Missabe and Iron Range Railway, which continues to lease the Duluth and Iron Range Railroad.

1938

- March: The property of the Duluth and Iron Range Railroad is conveyed to lessee Duluth, Missabe and Iron Range Railway.
- June 30: New York Central Railroad lessor Cleveland, Cincinnati, Chicago and St. Louis Railway absorbs seven other lessors, including the formerly Class I Cincinnati Northern Railroad and Evansville, Indianapolis and Terre Haute Railway. NYC lessor Toledo and Ohio Central Railway absorbs lessor Kanawha and Michigan Railway.
- November: The Copper River and Northwestern Railway is abandoned.

1939

- The Savannah and Atlanta Railway (not yet Class I), in receivership since March 4, 1921 and trusteeship since January 1, 1937, is reorganized under the same name.
- The Chicago, Burlington and Quincy Railroad acquires a portion of the property of subsidiary Quincy, Omaha and Kansas City Railroad (no longer Class I), and the rest is abandoned.
- The Kansas City Southern Railway gains control of the Louisiana and Arkansas Railway.
- July 1: The Louisiana, Arkansas and Texas Railway merges into parent Louisiana and Arkansas Railway.
- September 1: The Chicago, Rock Island and Pacific Railway leases Texas subsidiary Chicago, Rock Island and Gulf Railway.
- October 11: In receivership since June 1, 1931, the Fort Smith and Western Railway abandons all operations. A portion is acquired by Kansas City Southern Railway subsidiary Fort Smith and Van Buren Railway (not Class I).
- December 29: The Northern Alabama Railway merges into parent Southern Railway.

1940

- August 1: The Gulf, Mobile and Ohio Railroad acquires and begins operating the property of the former Southern Railway subsidiary Mobile and Ohio Railroad, in receivership since June 3, 1932.
- September 13: The Gulf, Mobile and Northern Railroad merges into the Gulf, Mobile and Ohio Railroad.
- December 31: The Chicago and Eastern Illinois Railroad begins operating the former Chicago and Eastern Illinois Railway, in trusteeship since September 16, 1933.
- December 31: The Wichita Falls and Southern Railroad (no longer Class I) absorbs lessor Wichita Falls and Southern Railway.

1941

- Great Northern Railway subsidiary Spokane, Coeur d'Alene and Palouse Railway (former Spokane and Inland Empire Railroad) de-electrifies, but is no longer Class I.
- February 20: The Chicago Great Western Railway begins operating the former Chicago Great Western Railroad.
- June 30: The Kansas City, Mexico and Orient Railway merges into lessee Atchison, Topeka and Santa Fe Railway.
- October 1: The Spokane International Railroad begins operating the former property of Canadian Pacific Railway subsidiary Spokane International Railway, in trusteeship since August 28, 1933.
- October 22: The Northern Pacific Railway purchases the property of subsidiary Minnesota and International Railway (no longer Class I) at foreclosure.
- December 22: The property of the Chicago and Erie Railroad is conveyed to parent Erie Railroad as part of the latter's reorganization that takes it out of Chesapeake and Ohio Railway control. The Erie had been in trusteeship since May 7, 1938.

1942

- January 1: Pennsylvania Railroad subsidiary Wabash Railroad begins operating the former Wabash Railway, in receivership since December 1, 1931.
- January 21: The Norfolk Southern Railway acquires the property of the former Norfolk Southern Railroad, in receivership since July 28, 1932.
- June 30: The Grand Canyon Railway (no longer Class I) merges into lessee Atchison, Topeka and Santa Fe Railway.

1943

- January 1: Wabash Railroad subsidiary Ann Arbor Railroad exits a receivership that began on December 4, 1931 without reorganization.
- July 1: The Great Northern Railway acquires the property of subsidiary Spokane, Coeur d'Alene and Palouse Railway (no longer Class I).
- December 1: The Minneapolis and St. Louis Railway begins operating the former Minneapolis and St. Louis Railroad, in receivership since July 26, 1923.
- December 31: The Texarkana and Fort Smith Railway merges into lessee Kansas City Southern Railway.

1944

- February 1: The Akron, Canton and Youngstown Railroad begins operating the former Akron, Canton and Youngstown Railway, in trusteeship since April 4, 1933.
- September 1: The Minneapolis, St. Paul and Sault Ste. Marie Railroad begins operating the former Minneapolis, St. Paul and Sault Ste. Marie Railway, in trusteeship since January 1, 1938.
- December 23: The Baltimore and Ohio Railroad acquires the property of lessor Toledo and Cincinnati Railroad, which acquired it from the Cincinnati, Hamilton and Dayton Railway in 1917.

1945

- Spokane, Portland and Seattle Railway subsidiary Oregon Electric Railway de-electrifies.
- May 25: The Gulf, Mobile and Ohio Railroad buys the Alton Railroad from the Baltimore and Ohio Railroad.
- December 1: The Chicago, Milwaukee, St. Paul and Pacific Railroad reorganizes without change of name, exiting a bankruptcy it entered on June 29, 1935. in receivership since March 18, 1925.
- December 14: The Illinois Terminal Railroad is reorganized under the same name, leaving Illinois Power and Light Corporation control.
- December 26: The Illinois Central Railroad acquires the property of subsidiary Gulf and Ship Island Railroad.
- December 28: The Syracuse, Binghamton and New York Railroad merges into lessee Delaware, Lackawanna and Western Railroad.
- December 31: The Perkiomen Railroad merges into lessee Reading Company.

1946

- January 1: The Atlanta, Birmingham and Coast Railroad merges into the Atlantic Coast Line Railroad, its parent since 1927.
- May 1: The Chicago, Indianapolis and Louisville Railway, better known as the Monon Railroad, in trusteeship since January 1, 1934, reorganizes under the same name, and is freed from its former joint control by the Louisville and Nashville Railroad and Southern Railway.
- July 1: The Illinois Central Railroad acquires the property of subsidiary Yazoo and Mississippi Valley Railroad.
- August 1: The Seaboard Air Line Railroad acquires the former Seaboard Air Line Railway, in receivership since December 23, 1930.
- August 5: Central Railroad of New Jersey subsidiary Central Railroad of Pennsylvania, renamed from Easton and Western Railroad in early 1944, begins operating the Pennsylvania lines of the CNJ.
- September 7: The Missouri and Arkansas Railway ceases operations due to a strike. Portions are taken over by the Helena and Northwestern Railway (in 1949) and Arkansas and Ozarks Railway (in 1950), and the remainder is abandoned. Both successor shortlines soon go out of business, though the Cotton Plant-Fargo Railway continues to operate a piece of the old H&NW into the 1970s.
- November 7: The property of lessor Connecticut and Passumpsic Rivers Railroad is conveyed to lessee Boston and Maine Railroad from Wells River south to White River Junction, and to the Newport and Richford Railroad (leased to the Canadian Pacific Railway) from Wells River north to that company's line at Newport (and beyond to the Canada–US border).
- December 31: The Pennsylvania Railroad and New York Central Railroad subsidiary Pittsburgh and Lake Erie Railroad buy joint control of the Montour Railroad from the Consolidated Coal Company.

1947

- April 1: The Pittsburg, Shawmut and Northern Railroad, in receivership since August 1, 1905, ceases operations.
- April 11: The Denver and Rio Grande Western Railroad exits a trusteeship that it entered on November 1, 1935, free of its former joint control by the Missouri Pacific Railroad and Western Pacific Railroad parent Western Pacific Railroad Corporation. Simultaneously, the Denver and Salt Lake Railway, which had been controlled by the Reconstruction Finance Corporation, is merged into the D&RGW.
- May: The Chesapeake and Ohio Railway sells its minority share of the Wheeling and Lake Erie Railway to the New York, Chicago and St. Louis Railroad, giving that company a majority of W&LE stock. The three companies have been affiliated since the Van Sweringen brothers purchased a minority of stock in the 1920s.
- May 31: The Alton Railroad is merged into the Gulf, Mobile and Ohio Railroad, its parent since 1945.
- June 6: The Pere Marquette Railway merges into the Chesapeake and Ohio Railway, with which it has been affiliated since the Van Sweringen brothers purchased a minority of stock in the 1920s.
- September 18: The New York, New Haven and Hartford Railroad reorganizes, ending a trusteeship that began on October 23, 1935.
- December 31: The Oahu Railway and Land Company abandons its line outside Honolulu.

1948

- The Bingham and Garfield Railway is closed and replaced by a private railroad.
- January 1: The Chicago, Rock Island and Pacific Railroad begins operating the properties of the former Chicago, Rock Island and Pacific Railway and lessor Chicago, Rock Island and Gulf Railway, in trusteeship since June 8 and November 1, 1933, respectively.
- July 1: The Central of Georgia Railway, no longer under Illinois Central Railroad control, is reorganized under the same name, ending a receivership that began on December 20, 1932.
- August 4: The Texas and Northern Railway is incorporated to take over the existing private railroad of the Lone Star Steel Company. It immediately becomes Class I.
- December 28: The St. Louis-San Francisco Railway acquires control of the Alabama, Tennessee and Northern Railroad (not yet Class I).
- December 31: The Chicago, Terre Haute and Southeastern Railway merges into lessee Chicago, Milwaukee, St. Paul and Pacific Railroad.
- December 31: The Fort Worth and Rio Grande Railway merges into lessee Gulf, Colorado and Santa Fe Railway (Atchison, Topeka and Santa Fe Railway system). The Pecos and Northern Texas Railway, also part of the AT&SF system, merges into the Panhandle and Santa Fe Railway, which leases its line west of Sweetwater; the GC&SF continues to lease the line, now owned by the P&SF, east of Sweetwater.

1949

- February 20: The Midland Terminal Railway (not Class I), successor to remnants of the Colorado Midland Railroad and Cripple Creek and Colorado Springs Railroad, ceases operations.
- July 1: The Southern Railway's lease of the Atlantic and Danville Railway expires, and the A&D immediately becomes Class I.
- November 1: Canadian Pacific Railway subsidiary Duluth, South Shore and Atlantic Railroad acquires the properties of the Duluth, South Shore and Atlantic Railway and subsidiary Mineral Range Railroad (no longer Class I), both controlled by the CP. These companies entered trusteeship on January 1 and June 1, 1937, respectively.
- December 1: The New York, Chicago and St. Louis Railroad leases subsidiary Wheeling and Lake Erie Railway.

1950

- June 1: The Fort Worth and Denver City Railway (Chicago, Burlington and Quincy Railroad system) and Chicago, Rock Island and Pacific Railroad both lease the jointly owned Burlington-Rock Island Railroad, operating it as the Joint Texas Division.
- November 1: The Rutland Railway begins operating the former Rutland Railroad, in receivership since May 5, 1938 and trusteeship since June 21, 1944. The company had been jointly owned by the New York Central Railroad and New York, New Haven and Hartford Railroad.

1951

- The Central of Georgia Railway acquires control of the Savannah and Atlanta Railway (not yet Class I).
- July 1: Southern Railway subsidiary Carolina and Northwestern Railway leases the properties of other subsidiaries: Blue Ridge Railway, Danville and Western Railway, High Point, Randleman, Asheboro and Southern Railroad, and Yadkin Railroad, none of which connect to each other or the C&NW.
- August 7: Chicago, Burlington and Quincy Railroad subsidiary Fort Worth and Denver City Railway is renamed Fort Worth and Denver Railway.

1952

- June 13: The Wichita Valley Railway (no longer Class I), subsidiary of the Colorado and Southern Railway (Chicago, Burlington and Quincy Railroad system), is merged into C&S Texas subsidiary Fort Worth and Denver Railway.
- June 30: The Toledo and Ohio Central Railway merges into lessee New York Central Railroad.
- December 31: Operation of the Central Railroad of New Jersey lines operated by subsidiary Central Railroad of Pennsylvania is returned to the CNJ.

1953

- May 25: The New York, Susquehanna and Western Railroad is reorganized under the same name, exiting a trusteeship that began on June 1, 1937 and control by the Erie Railroad. Subsidiary Wilkes-Barre and Eastern Railroad (not Class I) had been abandoned on March 25, 1939, cutting the NYS&W back from Wilkes-Barre to Stroudsburg.
- December 31: The Pennsylvania Railroad merges a number of lessors, including former Class I Grand Rapids and Indiana Railway, into the newly incorporated Penndel Company.

1954

- The Wichita Falls and Southern Railroad (no longer Class I) ceases operations. The Chicago, Rock Island and Pacific Railroad acquires a portion of the line and operates it until 1969.
- March 1: The St. Louis Southwestern Railway leases Texas subsidiary St. Louis Southwestern Railway of Texas.
- March 1: Minneapolis, St. Paul and Sault Ste. Marie Railroad lessor Wisconsin Central Railroad begins operating the former Wisconsin Central Railway, which entered receivership on December 3, 1932 and trusteeship on October 1, 1944. The WC was classified as a separate Class I railroad starting in 1946, and continues as such.
- July 1: The Baltimore and Ohio Railroad acquires the properties of the Buffalo and Susquehanna Railroad, operated under lease since 1932.

1955

- September 30: The Southern Pacific Company merges several lessors into itself: Arizona Eastern Railroad (formerly Class I), Dawson Railway, El Paso and Rock Island Railway, El Paso and Southwestern Railroad, and Southern Pacific Railroad.

1956

- The Wellsville, Addison and Galeton Railroad (not Class I) takes over operations from the Baltimore and Ohio Railroad of much of the former Buffalo and Susquehanna Railroad, isolated from the rest of the B&O by a 1942 flood. The WA&G will be abandoned on March 13, 1979.
- January 11: The Chicago, Indianapolis and Louisville Railway is renamed Monon Railroad.
- February 1: Western Pacific Railroad subsidiary Sacramento Northern Railway, in trusteeship since December 22, 1953, is reorganized without change of name.
- March 1: As part of the Missouri Pacific Railroad's plan to end a bankruptcy dating from 1933, it absorbs 23 subsidiaries, including some Class I railroads: New Orleans, Texas and Mexico Railway (Gulf Coast Lines), Beaumont, Sour Lake and Western Railway, St. Louis, Brownsville and Mexico Railway, San Antonio, Uvalde and Gulf Railroad, and International-Great Northern Railroad.
- April 2: The Pennsylvania Railroad merges lessor Pittsburgh, Cincinnati, Chicago and St. Louis Railroad into lessor Philadelphia, Baltimore and Washington Railroad.
- May 31: The Pennsylvania Railroad merges lessor Pennsylvania, Ohio and Detroit Railroad into lessor Connecting Railway.
- June 11: The Canadian National Railway merges a number of subsidiaries, including the Canadian Northern Railway and Grand Trunk Pacific Railway, that it had formerly operated.
- June 15: The Illinois Terminal Railroad is reorganized under the same name, becoming a joint subsidiary of the Baltimore and Ohio Railroad, Chicago and Eastern Illinois Railroad, Chicago, Burlington and Quincy Railroad, Gulf, Mobile and Ohio Railroad, Litchfield and Madison Railway, Illinois Central Railroad, New York, Chicago and St. Louis Railroad (Nickel Plate), St. Louis-San Francisco Railway, and Wabash Railroad. The Chicago, Rock Island and Pacific Railroad and New York Central Railroad are later added, bringing the total to 11.
- December 31: The ICC raises the minimum operating revenue from $1 million to $3 million effective January 1, 1956, dropping thirteen railroads to Class II:
  - Atlantic and Danville Railway (Norfolk and Western Railway subsidiary)
  - Cambria and Indiana Railroad
  - Canadian National Lines in New England
  - Canadian Pacific Lines in Vermont
  - Columbus and Greenville Railway
  - Detroit and Mackinac Railway
  - Midland Valley Railroad
  - Mississippi Central Railroad
  - Montour Railroad
  - Oklahoma City-Ada-Atoka Railway
  - Pittsburg and Shawmut Railroad
  - Texas and Northern Railway
  - Utah Railway
  - The March 1 merger of Missouri Pacific Railroad subsidiaries eliminates five more. On the other hand, the Carolina and Northwestern Railway (a Southern Railway subsidiary), Litchfield and Madison Railway, Minneapolis, Northfield and Southern Railway, Piedmont and Northern Railway, and Savannah and Atlanta Railway (a Central of Georgia Railway subsidiary) become Class I, making a total of 113 Class I railroads at the end of 1956, down from 126 in 1955.

1957

- The St. Louis-San Francisco Railway acquires control of the Central of Georgia Railway. The ICC will reverse its approval on November 14, 1958, and in 1963 the Southern Railway will buy the Frisco's share.
- January 1: The Chicago and North Western Railway leases subsidiary Chicago, St. Paul, Minneapolis and Omaha Railway.
- March 29: New York, New Haven and Hartford Railroad subsidiary New York, Ontario and Western Railway, which entered trusteeship on May 21, 1937, ceases operations. Very little is bought by other railroads, most notably Fulton-Oswego by the New York Central Railroad (which had operated there via trackage rights). This is the last Class I to completely abandon operations while still Class I, with none of its core lines acquired by other companies.
- August 30: The Nashville, Chattanooga and St. Louis Railway merges into parent Louisville and Nashville Railroad.

1958

- January 1: Pennsylvania Railroad lessor Penndel Company absorbs other lessors including former Class I Cumberland Valley and Martinsburg Railroad and New York, Philadelphia and Norfolk Railroad.
- January 2: The Litchfield and Madison Railway merges into the Chicago and North Western Railway.
- October 6: The Union Pacific Railroad buys control of the Spokane International Railroad.

1959

- May 29: The Alabama and Vicksburg Railway and Vicksburg, Shreveport and Pacific Railway merge into lessee Illinois Central Railroad.
- December 1: The Virginian Railway merges into the Norfolk and Western Railway.
- December 31: The Charleston and Western Carolina Railway merges into parent Atlantic Coast Line Railroad.

1960

- February 10: The Atchison, Topeka and Santa Fe Railway buys the entire stock of the Toledo, Peoria and Western Railroad, and sells half to the Pennsylvania Railroad on February 23.
- July: The Atlantic and St. Lawrence Railroad, leased to the Grand Trunk Railway and later the Canadian National Railway since 1853, but reported to the ICC as a separate Class I railroad (as "Canadian National Lines in New England" beginning in 1930), is merged into the Canadian National Railway along with three other lessors (Champlain and St. Lawrence Railroad, United States and Canada Railroad, and Vermont and Province Line Railroad).
- July 1: The Missouri-Kansas-Texas Railroad of Texas merges into parent Missouri-Kansas-Texas Railroad.
- October 17: The Delaware, Lackawanna and Western Railroad and Erie Railroad merge to form the Erie-Lackawanna Railroad.
- November 1: The Chicago and North Western Railway acquires the property of the Minneapolis and St. Louis Railway.

1961

- January 1: Canadian Pacific Railway subsidiaries Duluth, South Shore and Atlantic Railroad, Minneapolis, St. Paul and Sault Ste. Marie Railroad, and Wisconsin Central Railroad merge to form the Soo Line Railroad.
- April 9: Southern Pacific Company subsidiary Pacific Electric Railway ceases electric passenger service, leaving only diesel freight service.
- September 25: Operations cease on the Rutland Railway due to a strike, and abandonment is approved in 1963. The state of Vermont will buy much of its property, and the Vermont Railway (not Class I) will begin operating the main line in January 1964.
- November 1: Central Railroad of New Jersey subsidiary Lehigh and New England Railway acquires a portion of the Lehigh and New England Railroad, the rest of which is abandoned.
- November 1: The Texas and New Orleans Railroad merges into parent Southern Pacific Company.

1962

- October 31: Norfolk and Western Railway subsidiary Norfolk, Franklin and Danville Railway acquires the property of the Atlantic and Danville Railway (no longer Class I).

1963

- February 4: The Chesapeake and Ohio Railway takes control of the Baltimore and Ohio Railroad.
- March 4: The California, Arizona and Santa Fe Railway merges into lessee Atchison, Topeka and Santa Fe Railway.
- June: The Southern Railway buys a majority interest in the Central of Georgia Railway from the St. Louis-San Francisco Railway.
- July 1: Southern Railway subsidiary Georgia and Florida Railway (controlled indirectly through the Carolina and Northwestern Railway, Live Oak, Perry and Gulf Railroad, and South Georgia Railway) begins operating the former Georgia and Florida Railroad, in receivership since October 20, 1929.
- August 31: Pennsylvania Railroad subsidiary Wabash Railroad sells the Ann Arbor Railroad to the Detroit, Toledo and Ironton Railroad, also controlled by the Pennsylvania, in preparation for the lease of the Wabash to the Norfolk and Western Railway.

1964

- January 1: The St. Louis, San Francisco and Texas Railway is merged into parent St. Louis-San Francisco Railway.
- April: The Fort Worth and Denver Railway (Chicago, Burlington and Quincy Railroad system) and Chicago, Rock Island and Pacific Railroad each buy one-half shares in the property of the jointly leased Burlington-Rock Island Railroad, continuing to operate it as the Joint Texas Division.
- May 1: The Boston and Maine Railroad merges into the Boston and Maine Corporation, which becomes the new operating company.
- September: The Muskogee Company sells its railroad subsidiaries, including the Kansas, Oklahoma and Gulf Railway, Midland Valley Railroad, and Oklahoma City-Ada-Atoka Railway, only the former still Class I, to Missouri Pacific Railroad subsidiary Texas and Pacific Railway. The T&P resells the OCAA to the Atchison, Topeka and Santa Fe Railway.
- October 16: The Norfolk and Western Railway absorbs the New York, Chicago and St. Louis Railroad (Nickel Plate) and continues its lease of the Wheeling and Lake Erie Railway, leases the Wabash Railroad and Pittsburgh and West Virginia Railway, and gains control of the Akron, Canton and Youngstown Railroad.

1965

- April 22: The Atchison, Topeka and Santa Fe Railway leases subsidiary Oklahoma City-Ada-Atoka Railway (no longer Class I).
- August 1: The Gulf, Colorado and Santa Fe Railway, Panhandle and Santa Fe Railway, and P&SF lessor Kansas City, Mexico and Orient Railway of Texas are merged into parent Atchison, Topeka and Santa Fe Railway.
- August 13: The Pacific Electric Railway merges into parent Southern Pacific Company.
- December 31: The ICC raises the minimum operating revenue from $3 million to $5 million effective January 1, 1965, dropping 21 railroads to Class II:
  - Atlanta and St. Andrews Bay Railway
  - Atlanta and West Point Railroad (Atlantic Coast Line Railroad subsidiary)
  - Carolina and Northwestern Railway (Southern Railway subsidiary)
  - Colorado and Wyoming Railway
  - Georgia and Florida Railway (Southern Railway subsidiary)
  - Green Bay and Western Railroad
  - Kansas, Oklahoma and Gulf Railway (Missouri Pacific Railroad subsidiary)
  - Lehigh and Hudson River Railway
  - Minneapolis, Northfield and Southern Railway
  - Missouri-Illinois Railroad (Missouri Pacific Railroad subsidiary)
  - Monongahela Railway
  - New York Connecting Railroad
  - New York, Susquehanna and Western Railroad
  - Quanah, Acme and Pacific Railway
  - San Diego and Arizona Eastern Railway (Southern Pacific Company subsidiary)
  - Savannah and Atlanta Railway (Southern Railway subsidiary)
  - Spokane International Railroad (Union Pacific Railroad subsidiary)
  - Staten Island Rapid Transit Railway (Baltimore and Ohio Railroad subsidiary)
  - Tennessee Central Railway
  - Texas Mexican Railway
  - Western Railway of Alabama (Atlantic Coast Line Railroad subsidiary)
  - Together with the mid-1965 demise of the Pacific Electric Railway, this reduces the number of Class I railroads from 98 at the end of 1964 to 76 as of December 31, 1965.

1966

- January 20: The Pennsylvania Railroad sells the Long Island Rail Road to the Metropolitan Commuter Transportation Authority.
- Erie-Lackawanna Railroad subsidiary New Jersey and New York Railroad is reorganized under the same name, having been in trusteeship since July 1, 1938.

1967

- The Butte, Anaconda and Pacific Railway (no longer Class I) de-electrifies.
- March 29: The Chesapeake and Ohio Railway and subsidiary Baltimore and Ohio Railroad take control of the Western Maryland Railway.
- April 1: The Midland Valley Railroad (no longer Class I) is merged into parent Texas and Pacific Railway, a subsidiary of the Missouri Pacific Railroad.
- April 29: The Illinois Central Railroad purchases the property of the Mississippi Central Railroad (no longer Class I).
- May 12: The Missouri Pacific Railroad gains control of the Chicago and Eastern Illinois Railroad.
- July 1: The Atlantic Coast Line Railroad and Seaboard Air Line Railroad merge to form the Seaboard Coast Line Railroad.
- December 1: The Oklahoma City-Ada-Atoka Railway merges into lessee Atchison, Topeka and Santa Fe Railway.
- December 29: The property of Norfolk and Western Railway lessor Pittsburgh and West Virginia Railway is conveyed to a new common law business trust, Pittsburgh and West Virginia Railroad, which remains a lessor.
- December 30: The Erie-Lackawanna Railroad acquires the property of subsidiary New Jersey and New York Railroad (no longer Class I).

1968

- February 1: The New York Central Railroad and Pennsylvania Railroad merge to form the Pennsylvania New York Central Transportation Company.
- April 1: The Erie-Lackawanna Railroad merges into the new Erie Lackawanna Railway, which becomes an operating company, owned by Norfolk and Western Railway subsidiary Dereco, Inc.
- May 8: The Pennsylvania New York Central Transportation Company is renamed Penn Central Company.
- July 1: The Chicago Great Western Railway is merged into the Chicago and North Western Railway.
- July 1: The Delaware and Hudson Railway, owned by Norfolk and Western Railway subsidiary Dereco, Inc., begins operating the former Delaware and Hudson Railroad.
- August 31: The Tennessee Central Railway (no longer Class I) ceases operations. The entire main line is acquired by the Illinois Central Railroad (Hopkinsville-Nashville), Louisville and Nashville Railroad (Nashville-Crossville), and Southern Railway subsidiary Harriman and Northeastern Railroad (Crossville-Harriman). These companies and successors have since abandoned major portions, leaving the Nashville and Western Railroad and Nashville and Eastern Railroad as the primary operators.

1969

- January 1: The New York, New Haven and Hartford Railroad, bankrupt since July 7, 1961, conveys its property to the Penn Central Company.
- January: The Southern Railway merges its subsidiary New Orleans and Northeastern Railroad into the Alabama Great Southern Railroad.
- June: Missouri Pacific Railroad subsidiary Chicago and Eastern Illinois Railroad sells its Evansville line (former Evansville and Terre Haute Railroad) to the Louisville and Nashville Railroad.
- July 1: The Piedmont and Northern Railway merges into the Seaboard Coast Line Railroad.
- October 1: The Penn Central Company is renamed Penn Central Transportation Company.
- November 26: The Southern Pacific Company is merged into the newly incorporated Southern Pacific Transportation Company, which becomes an operating railroad.
- December 1: The Penn Central Transportation Company leases the New York Connecting Railroad (no longer Class I).

1970

- March 2: The Great Northern Railway, Northern Pacific Railway, Chicago, Burlington and Quincy Railroad (jointly owned by the GN and NP), and Pacific Coast Railroad (not Class I, owned by the GN) merge into Burlington Northern Inc., which becomes an operating railroad. Other GN and NP subsidiaries, including the Colorado and Southern Railway, Fort Worth and Denver Railway, Spokane, Portland and Seattle Railway, and Oregon Electric Railway, are not yet consolidated, though the SP&S is immediately leased.
- April 1: The Kansas, Oklahoma and Gulf Railway (no longer Class I) is merged into parent Texas and Pacific Railway, a subsidiary of the Missouri Pacific Railroad.

1971

- January 1: The Alabama, Tennessee and Northern Railroad is merged into the St. Louis-San Francisco Railway.
- May 1: The National Railroad Passenger Corporation (later Amtrak), listed as Class I until about 1980, takes over most intercity passenger trains in the U.S. Notable exceptions are the Southern Railway and Denver and Rio Grande Western Railroad, which joined Amtrak in 1979 and 1983 respectively, and the Chicago, Rock Island and Pacific Railroad, Georgia Railroad, and Reading Company, which later discontinued all service.
- June 1: The Southern Railway merges subsidiaries Central of Georgia Railway, Georgia and Florida Railway (no longer Class I), Savannah and Atlanta Railway (no longer Class I), and Wrightsville and Tennille Railroad (not Class I) to form the new Central of Georgia Railroad.
- July 1: Baltimore and Ohio Railroad subsidiary Staten Island Rapid Transit Railway (no longer Class I) sells its passenger operations to the Staten Island Rapid Transit Operating Authority.
- July 3: The Canadian Pacific Railway is renamed Canadian Pacific Ltd.
- July 31: The Monon Railroad is merged into the Louisville and Nashville Railroad.
- July 1: Baltimore and Ohio Railroad subsidiary Staten Island Rapid Transit Railway (no longer Class I) is renamed Staten Island Railroad.
- December 6: The Auto-Train Corporation begins operating passenger trains on Seaboard Coast Line Railroad and Richmond, Fredericksburg and Potomac Railroad trackage. It will be listed as Class I until about 1980.
- December 20: The Canadian National Railway transfers its ownership of the Central Vermont Railway, Duluth, Winnipeg and Pacific Railway, and Grand Trunk Western Railroad to new subsidiary holding company Grand Trunk Corporation.

1972

- April 1: After the Central Railroad of New Jersey abandons all of its Pennsylvania operations, including the Central Railroad of Pennsylvania and Lehigh and New England Railway, the Lehigh Valley Railroad temporarily takes over.
- June 1: The Chicago and North Western Transportation Company acquires the property of the Chicago and North Western Railway and lessor Chicago, St. Paul, Minneapolis and Omaha Railway.
- August 10: The Illinois Central Railroad and Gulf, Mobile and Ohio Railroad merge to form the Illinois Central Gulf Railroad, which simultaneously absorbs the Columbus and Greenville Railway (formerly Class I).

1973

- February 3: The Providence and Worcester Railroad (not Class I), formerly leased by the New York, New Haven and Hartford Railroad and Penn Central Transportation Company, begins operating its own line. It will soon acquire more ex-Conrail lines and become a major regional railroad.
- June 15: New holding company Chessie System, Inc. acquires control of the Chesapeake and Ohio Railway, including subsidiaries Baltimore and Ohio Railroad and Western Maryland Railway.

1974

- January 1: The Southern Railway buys the Norfolk Southern Railway and merges it with subsidiary Carolina and Northwestern Railway, keeping the Norfolk Southern name.

1975

- October 30: A new independent Columbus and Greenville Railway begins operating trackage formerly owned by a company of the same name, merged into the Illinois Central Gulf Railroad in 1972.

1976

- April 1: The government-owned Consolidated Rail Corporation begins operations, replacing a number of bankrupt Northeastern railroads and their subsidiaries. This includes many existing and former Class I railroads:
  - Erie Lackawanna Railway (subsidiary of Norfolk and Western Railway), bankrupt since June 26, 1972
  - Penn Central Transportation Company, bankrupt since June 21, 1970
    - Ann Arbor Railroad (subsidiary), bankrupt since October 15, 1973; property acquired by the state of Michigan. Conrail operates it until October 1, 1977.
    - Baltimore and Eastern Railroad (subsidiary, no longer Class I)
    - Cleveland, Cincinnati, Chicago and St. Louis Railway (lessor), bankrupt since July 14, 1973
    - Connecting Railway (lessor), bankrupt since July 14, 1973
    - Lehigh Valley Railroad (subsidiary), bankrupt since July 24, 1970
    - Michigan Central Railroad (lessor), bankrupt since July 14, 1973
    - New York Connecting Railroad (lessor)
    - Northern Central Railway (lessor), bankrupt since July 14, 1973
    - Penndel Company (lessor), bankrupt since July 14, 1973
    - Peoria and Eastern Railway (lessor)
    - Philadelphia, Baltimore and Washington Railroad (lessor), bankrupt since July 14, 1973
  - Lehigh and Hudson River Railway (joint subsidiary of Central of New Jersey, Erie Lackawanna, Lehigh Valley, and Penn Central; no longer Class I), bankrupt since April 19, 1972
  - Reading Company, bankrupt since November 23, 1971
    - Central Railroad of New Jersey (subsidiary), bankrupt since March 22, 1967
      - Central Railroad of Pennsylvania (lessor)
      - Lehigh and New England Railway (subsidiary, no longer Class I)
    - Port Reading Railroad (lessor)
  - Pennsylvania-Reading Seashore Lines (joint subsidiary of Penn Central and Reading)
    - West Jersey and Seashore Railroad (lessor)
  - Penn Central subsidiaries Detroit, Toledo and Ironton Railroad and Pittsburgh and Lake Erie Railroad stay out of Conrail, and the Delaware and Hudson Railway is assigned trackage rights throughout the Northeast to compete with Conrail. The Toledo, Peoria and Western Railroad buys the ex-Pittsburgh, Cincinnati, Chicago and St. Louis Railroad line between Effner and Logansport, Indiana, and the Michigan Northern Railway takes over the ex-Grand Rapids and Indiana Railway north of Grand Rapids, Michigan.
- October 15: The Chicago and Eastern Illinois Railroad and Texas and Pacific Railway are merged into parent Missouri Pacific Railroad.
- December 31: The ICC raises the minimum operating revenue from $5 million to $10 million effective January 1, 1976, dropping nine railroads to Class II:
  - Akron, Canton and Youngstown Railroad (Norfolk and Western Railway subsidiary)
  - Atlanta and West Point Railroad (Seaboard Coast Line Railroad subsidiary)
  - Green Bay and Western Railroad
  - Lake Superior and Ishpeming Railroad
  - Minneapolis, Northfield and Southern Railway
  - Monongahela Railway
  - Oregon Electric Railway (Burlington Northern Inc. subsidiary)
  - Spokane International Railroad (Union Pacific Railroad subsidiary)
  - Western Railway of Alabama (Seaboard Coast Line Railroad subsidiary)
  - The Chicago and Illinois Midland Railway, on the other hand, is raised to Class I; with the creation of Conrail and October 15 merger of two Missouri Pacific Railroad subsidiaries, the number of Class I railroads is reduced from 74 on December 31, 1975 to 58 at the end of 1976.
