= Timeline of Class I railroads (1910–1929) =

Timeline of Class I railroads
1910–1929 • 1930–1976 • 1977–present

The following is a brief history of the North American rail system, mainly through major changes to Class I railroads, the largest class by operating revenue.

1910

- July 1: The first year of classification by operating revenue begins.
- July 1: The property of the independent Chicago, Cincinnati and Louisville Railroad, which entered receivership on February 14, 1908, is conveyed to the Chesapeake and Ohio Railway of Indiana, a subsidiary of the Chesapeake and Ohio Railway.
- December 23: The property of the Oregon Railroad and Navigation Company is sold to the Oregon-Washington Railroad and Navigation Company, remaining a subsidiary of the Oregon Short Line Railroad (Union Pacific Railroad system).

1911

- January 1: The Chicago, Terre Haute and Southeastern Railway begins operations after acquiring the properties of the Southern Indiana Railway and subsidiary Chicago Southern Railway, which entered receivership on August 19 and August 25, 1908, respectively.
- February: The New York Central Railroad sells half of its majority interest in the Rutland Railroad to the New York, New Haven and Hartford Railroad.
- April 20: The Blacklick and Yellow Creek Railroad changes its name to Cambria and Indiana Railroad (not yet Class I).
- June 30: The first year of classification by operating revenue ends. There are 177 Class I railroads, including two Canadian companies (Canadian Pacific Railway and Canadian Northern Railway) not included in any totals by the ICC, and a separate listing for "Canadian Pacific Lines in Maine" (leased lines of the International Railway of Maine, Aroostook River Railroad, and Houlton Branch Railroad). Grand Trunk Railway of Canada lessor Atlantic and St. Lawrence Railroad is also listed as a Class I railroad.
- July: The Missouri, Kansas and Texas Railway gains control of the Wichita Falls and Northwestern Railway (not yet Class I).
- July 1: Pennsylvania Railroad subsidiaries Cleveland, Akron and Columbus Railway and Cincinnati and Muskingum Valley Railroad, the latter not Class I, merge to form the Cleveland, Akron and Cincinnati Railway.
- July 1: The Illinois Central Railroad begins operating the property of former subsidiary Indianapolis Southern Railroad, purchased at foreclosure.
- July 21: The Chicago and Eastern Illinois Railroad buys the property of subsidiary Evansville and Terre Haute Railroad.
- September 15: The Bingham and Garfield Railway completes its main line. It will be listed as Class II in 1912 and Class I in 1913.
- September 16: The International and Great Northern Railway begins operating the former International and Great Northern Railroad, in receivership since February 27, 1908.
- November: The Louisville and Nashville Railroad and St. Louis and San Francisco Railroad jointly buy control of the New Orleans, Mobile and Chicago Railroad, predecessor of the Gulf, Mobile and Northern.
- December 28: The property of Atchison, Topeka and Santa Fe Railway subsidiary Santa Fe, Prescott and Phoenix Railway is conveyed to AT&SF lessor California, Arizona and Santa Fe Railway.

1912

- January 1: Pennsylvania Railroad subsidiary Pennsylvania Company leases the Cleveland, Akron and Cincinnati Railway.
- January 1: The Minneapolis and St. Louis Railroad acquires the property of the Iowa Central Railway, formerly independent.
- March 20: The Sunset Railroad, controlled jointly by the Atchison, Topeka and Santa Fe Railway and Southern Pacific Company, merges with lessor Sunset Western Railway to form the Sunset Railway (no longer Class I).
- April 4: The Crystal City and Uvalde Railroad is renamed San Antonio, Uvalde and Gulf Railroad (not yet Class I).
- June 30: The Sunset Railroad is demoted from Class I to II; it will never return to the former classification. The Kansas City, Mexico and Orient Railway also becomes Class II, since Texas subsidiary Kansas City, Mexico and Orient Railway of Texas had been listed as a lessor in 1911, but is now listed as an operating subsidiary, and the revenues of the parent alone are not enough to qualify for Class I. On the other hand, the Detroit and Toledo Shore Line Railroad, Oahu Railway and Land Company, and Western Pacific Railroad are newly listed as Class I. The Chesapeake and Ohio Railway begins including data for subsidiary Chesapeake and Ohio Railway of Indiana with its own data. With the loss of the Cleveland, Akron and Cincinnati Railway, Evansville and Terre Haute Railroad, Indianapolis Southern Railroad, Iowa Central Railway, and Santa Fe, Prescott and Phoenix Railway, and electrification of the Spokane and Inland Empire Railroad, the number of Class I railroads drops from 177 in 1911 to 171 as of June 30, 1912.
- October 1: The Delaware, Lackawanna and Western Railroad leases subsidiary Syracuse, Binghamton and New York Railroad.
- December 9: Canadian Northern Railway subsidiary Duluth, Winnipeg and Pacific Railway completes its line and becomes Class I.
- December 24: The property of the Chicago, Milwaukee and Puget Sound Railway is conveyed to parent Chicago, Milwaukee and St. Paul Railway.

1913

- January 1: The Chicago, Peoria and St. Louis Railroad begins operating the former Chicago, Peoria and St. Louis Railway of Illinois, in receivership since July 1, 1909.
- May 1: The Denver and Salt Lake Railroad begins operating the former Denver, Northwestern and Pacific Railway, in receivership since May 2, 1912.
- May 28: The Butte, Anaconda and Pacific Railway begins electric service.
- June 30: The Arizona and New Mexico Railway, Bingham and Garfield Railway, Florence and Cripple Creek Railroad, Lehigh and New England Railroad, Missouri and North Arkansas Railroad, Missouri, Oklahoma and Gulf Railway, and Spokane International Railway are reclassified from II to I, and the new Duluth, Winnipeg and Pacific Railway is also Class I. The Missouri, Kansas and Texas Railway of Texas starts including its data with parent Missouri, Kansas and Texas Railway, and, with the disappearance of the Chicago, Milwaukee and Puget Sound Railway and Syracuse, Binghamton and New York Railroad, the number of Class I railroads rises from 171 in 1912 to 176 as of June 30, 1913.
- December 31: The Buffalo and Susquehanna Railroad is reorganized under the same name, having been in receivership since July 23, 1910. Former parent Buffalo and Susquehanna Railway (Class II), also in receivership (since May 3, 1910), remains independent, and is reorganized as the Wellsville and Buffalo Railroad (Class II) on December 14, 1915 and abandoned in November 1916.

1914

- January 1: The Cleveland, Cincinnati, Chicago and St. Louis Railway begins recording its lease of the Peoria and Eastern Railway, which dates from April 1, 1890, as such. Previously the P&E was listed as Class I.
- March 1: The Detroit, Toledo and Ironton Railroad begins operating the former Detroit, Toledo and Ironton Railway, which had been in receivership since February 1, 1908. As a consequence of this reorganization, the DT&I no longer controls the Ann Arbor Railroad.
- March 30: The Boston and Maine Railroad sells its controlling share in the Maine Central Railroad.
- April 7: The Grand Trunk Pacific Railway is completed.
- May 1: The Missouri, Kansas and Texas Railway leases subsidiary Wichita Falls and Southern Railway (not yet Class I) to Texas subsidiary Missouri, Kansas and Texas Railway of Texas.
- June 1: New York Central and Hudson River Railroad subsidiary Toledo and Ohio Central Railway buys control of the Kanawha and Michigan Railway from joint owners Lake Shore and Michigan Southern Railway (also a NYC subsidiary) and Chesapeake and Ohio Railway.
- June 5: Atchison, Topeka and Santa Fe Railway subsidiary Southern Kansas Railway of Texas is renamed Panhandle and Santa Fe Railway.
- June 30: Despite the loss of the Peoria and Eastern Railway, the number of Class I railroads remains at 176, its 1913 value, since Grand Trunk Railway of Canada lessor Chicago, Detroit and Canada Grand Trunk Junction Railroad, which reports separately, is raised from Class II to I.
- July 1: Atchison, Topeka and Santa Fe Railway subsidiary Pecos and Northern Texas Railway is leased in part to the Gulf, Colorado and Santa Fe Railway and Panhandle and Santa Fe Railway, being split at Sweetwater.
- July 6: The Kansas City, Mexico and Orient Railroad begins operating the former Kansas City, Mexico and Orient Railway, in receivership since March 7, 1912. Texas subsidiary Kansas City, Mexico and Orient Railway of Texas is in receivership from March 9, 1912, to July 8, 1914.
- July 29: The Pennsylvania Railroad leases subsidiary Northern Central Railway.
- August 14: The Utah Railway opens, initially operated by the Denver and Rio Grande Railroad.
- December 23: The New York Central and Hudson River Railroad merges with ten subsidiaries, including Class I Chicago, Indiana and Southern Railroad and Lake Shore and Michigan Southern Railway, to form the New York Central Railroad.

1915

- January 23: The Canadian Northern Railway is completed.
- May 1: The Cripple Creek and Colorado Springs Railroad (recently renamed from Golden Circle Railroad) acquires a portion of the property of former lessee Florence and Cripple Creek Railroad, the rest of which is abandoned.
- June 1: Due to the financial problems of the Grand Trunk Pacific Railway, which was to operate the mostly-completed National Transcontinental Railway, the Canadian government retains control of the NTR, grouping it with the existing Canadian Government Railways (primarily the Intercolonial Railway and Prince Edward Island Railway).
- July 1: The Monongahela Railroad (Class I) and Buckhannon and Northern Railroad (not Class I), both owned jointly by the Pennsylvania Company and New York Central Railroad subsidiary Pittsburgh and Lake Erie Railroad, merge to form the Monongahela Railway.
- November 1: The Wabash Railway begins operating the former Wabash Railroad, in receivership since December 26, 1911. It will soon lose its control of subsidiaries Wabash Pittsburgh Terminal Railway and Wheeling and Lake Erie Railroad when they reorganize.
- December 1: Independent Cincinnati, Indianapolis and Western Railroad begins operating the property of the former Cincinnati, Indianapolis and Western Railway, which had been leased to Baltimore and Ohio Railroad subsidiary Cincinnati, Hamilton and Dayton Railway, and entered receivership in February 1915.

1916

- January 1: The Atlanta, Birmingham and Atlantic Railway begins operating the former Atlanta, Birmingham and Atlantic Railroad, which had been in receivership since January 1, 1909.
- March 1: The New Orleans, Texas and Mexico Railway begins operating the former New Orleans, Texas and Mexico Railroad, which had been in receivership since July 5, 1913. It retains control of subsidiaries Beaumont, Sour Lake and Western Railway (not yet Class I), Orange and Northwestern Railroad (never Class I), and St. Louis, Brownsville and Mexico Railway (Class I since 1911), but is freed of its former control by the St. Louis and San Francisco Railroad, itself in receivership. This system comes to be known as the Gulf Coast Lines.
- July: The New York Central Railroad sells subsidiary New York, Chicago and St. Louis Railroad to the Van Sweringen brothers.
- July 1: The Southern Railway leases subsidiary Virginia and Southwestern Railway. This company still exists as a Norfolk Southern Railway lessor.
- July 14: The Western Pacific Railroad, owned by holding company Western Pacific Railroad Corporation, acquires the property of the former Western Pacific Railway, a subsidiary of the Denver and Rio Grande Railroad in receivership since March 5, 1915. (When the D&RG reorganizes in 1921, the WP will control its successor.)
- August 16: Union Pacific Railroad subsidiary San Pedro, Los Angeles and Salt Lake Railroad is renamed Los Angeles and Salt Lake Railroad.
- September 1: The Pittsburg, Shawmut and Northern Railroad, in receivership since August 1, 1905, terminates its lease of the Pittsburg and Shawmut Railroad, which becomes an independent Class I railroad.
- November: The Southern Railway buys control of the New Orleans and Northeastern Railroad from the Alabama, New Orleans, Texas and Pacific Junction Railways Company, as well as the latter's minority holdings in Cincinnati, New Orleans and Texas Pacific Railway parent Southwestern Construction Company. Through existing shares of that holding company held by the Southern and subsidiary Alabama Great Southern Railroad, the Southern now controls the CNO&TP.
- November 1: The St. Louis-San Francisco Railway begins operating the former St. Louis and San Francisco Railroad, in receivership since May 27, 1913. During its receivership, it has lost control of the Chicago and Eastern Illinois Railroad and New Orleans, Texas and Mexico Railroad.
- December 31: The ICC changes its year for which carriers report to end on December 31 rather than June 30. In the preceding six months, the Canadian Pacific Railway has stopped reporting, Missouri, Kansas and Texas Railway subsidiaries Missouri, Kansas and Texas Railway of Texas and Wichita Falls and Northwestern Railway and Kansas City Southern Railway subsidiary Texarkana and Fort Smith Railway have begun to report separately, the Pittsburg and Shawmut Railroad has commenced independent operations, and the Virginia and Southwestern Railway has been leased. With the raising of the Colorado and Wyoming Railway from Class II to I, the number of Class I railroads as of the end of 1916 is 183, up from 181 as of June 30.

1917

- January 1: The independent Gulf, Mobile and Northern Railroad begins operating the property of the former New Orleans, Mobile and Chicago Railroad, in receivership since December 19, 1913, and previously jointly owned by the Louisville and Nashville Railroad and St. Louis and San Francisco Railroad.
- January 1: The independent Wheeling and Lake Erie Railway begins operating the property of former Wabash Railway subsidiary Wheeling and Lake Erie Railroad, in receivership since June 8, 1908.
- January 1: Pennsylvania Railroad subsidiaries Pittsburgh, Cincinnati, Chicago and St. Louis Railway, Vandalia Railroad, and others merge to form the Pittsburgh, Cincinnati, Chicago and St. Louis Railroad.
- February 1: The Baltimore and Ohio Railroad acquires control of the Coal and Coke Railway.
- March 15: The Pere Marquette Railway acquires the property of the Pere Marquette Railroad.
- April 1: The independent Pittsburgh and West Virginia Railway begins operating the property of former Wabash Railway subsidiary Wabash Pittsburgh Terminal Railway, in receivership since May 29, 1908.
- April: The Sterling Trust succeeds the Alabama, New Orleans, Texas and Pacific Junction Railways Company as holding company for the Alabama and Vicksburg Railway and Vicksburg, Shreveport and Pacific Railway.
- May 31: The independent Colorado Midland Railroad begins operating the former Colorado Midland Railway, a joint subsidiary of the Colorado and Southern Railway (Chicago, Burlington and Quincy Railroad system) and Denver and Rio Grande Railroad that entered receivership on December 13, 1912.
- June 1: The Missouri Pacific Railroad begins operating the former properties of the Missouri Pacific Railway and subsidiary St. Louis, Iron Mountain and Southern Railway, both in receivership since August 19, 1915.
- July 18: Baltimore and Ohio Railroad subsidiary Cincinnati, Hamilton and Dayton Railway, in receivership since July 2, 1914, ceases operations after conveying much of its property to new B&O subsidiary and lessor Toledo and Cincinnati Railroad. Other pieces of the CH&D are either abandoned or sold to the newly incorporated independent Dayton, Toledo and Chicago Railway; former lessor Cincinnati, Findlay and Fort Wayne Railway is also freed of B&O control, and both independent companies soon abandon their lines.
- August 1: The Savannah and Atlanta Railway (not yet Class I) acquires the property of the Savannah and Northwestern Railway.
- September 30: The Canadian government acquires control of the Canadian Northern Railway.
- October 1: The San Diego and Arizona Railway (not yet Class I), half-owned by the Southern Pacific Company, acquires the property of the San Diego and South Eastern Railway.
- December 1: The Utah Railway begins operating its own line, heretofore leased to the Denver and Rio Grande Railroad. It immediately becomes Class I.

1918

- January 1: The United States Railroad Administration takes over operation of most of the U.S. rail network, including almost all Class I railroads.
- January 1: The Pennsylvania Railroad leases its subsidiaries that had been leased to the Pennsylvania Company, as well as the Philadelphia, Baltimore and Washington Railroad.
- January 17: The New York Connecting Railroad, jointly owned by the New York, New Haven and Hartford Railroad and Pennsylvania Railroad, begins hauling freight over the Hell Gate Bridge. It will become Class I in 1920.
- August 5: The Colorado Midland Railroad ceases operations after entering receivership on July 1, 1918. A piece at the east end continues to be operated under trackage rights by the Cripple Creek and Colorado Springs Railroad.
- August 6: The Minneapolis, Northfield and Southern Railway (not yet Class I) acquires the property of the former Minneapolis, St. Paul, Rochester and Dubuque Electric Traction Company, in receivership since February 20, 1916.
- October 1: The Baltimore and Ohio Railroad leases subsidiary Coal and Coke Railway.
- December 20: The title "Canadian National Railways" is adopted for the government-owned Canadian Northern Railway and Canadian Government Railways (primarily the National Transcontinental Railway, Intercolonial Railway, and Prince Edward Island Railway).

1919

- January 1: Former lessor Midland Terminal Railway (not Class I) leases the property owned by the Cripple Creek and Colorado Springs Railroad and its trackage rights operations over the remaining portion of the Colorado Midland Railroad.
- March 10: The Grand Trunk Railway of Canada subsidiary Grand Trunk Pacific Railway enters receivership, under control of the Canadian government.
- June 2: The Cumberland Valley Railroad is merged into parent Pennsylvania Railroad, but lessor Cumberland Valley and Martinsburg Railroad begins operating its own line, and is large enough to be Class I.
- July 31: The Kansas, Oklahoma and Gulf Railway takes over the property of the former Missouri, Oklahoma and Gulf Railway, in receivership since December 13, 1913.
- November 15: The San Diego and Arizona Railway (not yet Class I), half-owned by the Southern Pacific Company, completes its line.
- December 31: The Arizona and New Mexico Railway is demoted to Class II.

1920

- The Louisville and Nashville Railroad, subsidiary of the Atlantic Coast Line Railroad, purchases 1.73% of the stock of the Atlanta and West Point Railroad. Combined with existing ownership - 1.95% by the ACL and 46.98% by joint subsidiary Georgia Railroad - this gives the ACL control of the West Point.
- February 29: The Washington Southern Railway merges into parent Richmond, Fredericksburg and Potomac Railroad.
- March 1: The United States Railroad Administration ceases operations, returning control to the railroad companies.
- March 1: The Akron, Canton and Youngstown Railway (not yet Class I) leases the Northern Ohio Railway, which had been leased to the Lake Erie and Western Railroad, part of the New York Central Railroad system.
- March 1: The Missouri, Kansas and Texas Railway sells subsidiary Wichita Falls and Southern Railway, which was leased to Texas subsidiary Missouri, Kansas and Texas Railway of Texas, and it resumes independent operations (not yet Class I).
- June: The independent Evansville, Indianapolis and Terre Haute Railway begins operating the property of the former Chicago and Eastern Illinois Railroad subsidiary Evansville and Indianapolis Railroad, in receivership since February 5, 1916.
- July 1: The Pennsylvania Railroad leases subsidiaries Cumberland Valley and Martinsburg Railroad and New York, Philadelphia and Norfolk Railroad.
- November 6: Southern Railway subsidiary Southern Railway in Mississippi is renamed Columbus and Greenville Railroad.

1921

- January 1: The Pennsylvania Railroad leases a number of subsidiaries, including Class I Cincinnati, Lebanon and Northern Railway, Grand Rapids and Indiana Railway, and Pittsburgh, Cincinnati, Chicago and St. Louis Railroad.
- March 26: The Missouri-Illinois Railroad (not yet Class I) begins operating the former Illinois Southern Railway, in receivership since September 17, 1918.
- July 1: The Chicago, Milwaukee and St. Paul Railway leases the Chicago, Terre Haute and Southeastern Railway.
- July 1: The Wichita Falls and Southern Railroad (not yet Class I) opens and leases the Wichita Falls and Southern Railway.
- August 1: The Denver and Rio Grande Western Railroad, a subsidiary of Western Pacific Railroad parent Western Pacific Railroad Corporation, begins operating the former Denver and Rio Grande Railroad, in receivership since January 26, 1918. (The D&RG had controlled WP predecessor Western Pacific Railway until its 1916 reorganization.)
- December 20: The Midland Terminal Railway (not Class I) purchases the remaining property of lessor Cripple Creek and Colorado Springs Railroad (formerly Class I).
- December 29: The Midland Terminal Railway (not Class I) purchases the remaining property of lessor Colorado Midland Railroad (formerly Class I), in receivership since July 1, 1918.
- December 31: The Chesapeake and Ohio Railway leases subsidiary Chesapeake and Ohio Railway of Indiana.

1922

- January: The Toledo, St. Louis and Western Railroad begins distributing its Chicago and Alton Railroad stock, ending its control of that company.
- January 1: The El Paso and Southwestern Company buys the Arizona and New Mexico Railway (no longer Class I) from the Phelps Dodge Corporation and leases it to lessor El Paso and Southwestern Railroad.
- January 1: The Chicago and Eastern Illinois Railway begins operating the former Chicago and Eastern Illinois Railroad, in receivership since May 27, 1913. During its receivership, it has lost its relationships with parent St. Louis and San Francisco Railroad and subsidiary Evansville and Indianapolis Railroad (not yet Class I).
- January 1: The New York Central Railroad leases subsidiaries Toledo and Ohio Central Railway and Kanawha and Michigan Railway.
- January 31: The Tennessee Central Railway acquires the property of the former Tennessee Central Railroad, in receivership since December 31, 1912.
- March: The Van Sweringen brothers buy control of the Toledo, St. Louis and Western Railroad.
- April 24: The Missouri and North Arkansas Railway begins operating the former Missouri and North Arkansas Railroad, in receivership since April 1, 1912.
- April 26: The Van Sweringen brothers buy the Lake Erie and Western Railroad from the New York Central Railroad.
- July 1: The New York, Chicago and St. Louis Railroad leases the Lake Erie and Western Railroad, both companies being controlled by the Van Sweringen brothers.
- December 1: The International-Great Northern Railroad begins operating the former International and Great Northern Railway, in receivership since August 11, 1914.
- December 31: The Akron, Canton and Youngstown Railway is raised from Class II to I.

1923

- The Fort Smith and Western Railway begins operating the former Fort Smith and Western Railroad, in receivership since October 9, 1915.
- January 1: The Van Sweringen brothers merge their Toledo, St. Louis and Western Railroad and lessor Lake Erie and Western Railroad into the New York, Chicago and St. Louis Railroad. The TStL&W had been in receivership since October 22, 1914.
- January 20: The new Canadian National Railway takes over operation of the Canadian National Railways, consisting of the Canadian Northern Railway and Canadian Government Railways (primarily the National Transcontinental Railway, Intercolonial Railway, and Prince Edward Island Railway), as well as the Grand Trunk Pacific Railway.
- January 30: The Grand Trunk Railway of Canada is merged into the government-owned Canadian National Railway, completing a process begun in 1920 to save the financially troubled Grand Trunk.
- April 1: The Missouri-Kansas-Texas Railroad begins operating most of the former Missouri, Kansas and Texas Railway and subsidiary Wichita Falls and Northwestern Railway, in receivership since September 27, 1915 and May 29, 1917, respectively. Texas subsidiary Missouri, Kansas and Texas Railway of Texas, placed under a receiver's control at the same time, is simultaneously reorganized as the Missouri-Kansas-Texas Railroad of Texas. Property not retained in the reorganization includes the Shreveport-Dallas line, acquired by Louisiana Railway and Navigation Company subsidiary Louisiana Railway and Navigation Company of Texas, and the Oklahoma City-Atoka line, acquired by the Oklahoma City-Ada-Atoka Railway (not yet Class I).
- August 6: The independent Columbus and Greenville Railway begins operating the property of former Southern Railway subsidiary Columbus and Greenville Railroad, in receivership since June 4, 1921.
- August 17: The Lake Superior and Ishpeming Railway merges with the Munising, Marquette and Southeastern Railway (not Class I) to form the Lake Superior and Ishpeming Railroad.

1924

- January 1: The Atchison, Topeka and Santa Fe Railway leases subsidiary Grand Canyon Railway (no longer Class I).
- January 1: The Philadelphia and Reading Railway merges into parent Reading Company, which becomes an operating railroad.
- February 1: Pennsylvania Railroad subsidiary Baltimore and Eastern Railroad (not Class I) begins operating the former Maryland, Delaware and Virginia Railway west of Denton. Independent Maryland and Delaware Coast Railway (not Class I) will acquire the rest on May 14; it is reorganized in 1932 as the Maryland and Delaware Seacoast Railroad.
- May 14: The Texas and Pacific Railway exits a receivership that began on October 27, 1916, and is acquired by the Missouri Pacific Railroad by the end of the year.
- June 20: The New Orleans, Texas and Mexico Railway (Gulf Coast Lines) buys control of the International-Great Northern Railroad.
- October 29: The Denver and Rio Grande Western Railroad exits a receivership that began on July 21, 1922, and is now equally owned by the Missouri Pacific Railroad and Western Pacific Railroad parent Western Pacific Railroad Corporation.
- November: The Sterling Trust sells the Alabama and Vicksburg Railway and Vicksburg, Shreveport and Pacific Railway to New York and New Orleans bankers.
- November 1: The Southern Pacific Company leases the subsidiaries of the El Paso and Southwestern Company, including the El Paso and Southwestern Railroad and Arizona and New Mexico Railway, which the Class I EP&SW Company had operated.
- November 8: The Southern Pacific Company leases subsidiary Arizona Eastern Railroad.
- December 1: The Clinchfield Railroad, an unincorporated entity organized jointly by the Atlantic Coast Line Railroad and subsidiary Louisville and Nashville Railroad, begins operating the Carolina, Clinchfield and Ohio Railway under lease.

1925

- January 1: The Missouri Pacific Railroad gains control of the Gulf Coast Lines, including parent New Orleans, Texas and Mexico Railway and several other Class I railroads: International-Great Northern Railroad (bought by the NOT&M on June 20, 1924), Beaumont, Sour Lake and Western Railway, and St. Louis, Brownsville and Mexico Railway.
- March 31: The Kansas City, Mexico and Orient Railway acquires the property of the former Kansas City, Mexico and Orient Railroad, in receivership since April 16, 1917.
- April 1: The Alton and Eastern Railroad (not Class I) begins operating a short piece of the former Chicago, Peoria and St. Louis Railroad, in receivership since July 31, 1914.
- May 1: Southern Pacific Company subsidiary Galveston, Harrisburg and San Antonio Railway leases the San Antonio and Aransas Pass Railway.
- May 19: The Wabash Railway gains control of the Ann Arbor Railroad.
- June: The Muskogee Company, parent of the Midland Valley Railroad, acquires control of the Kansas, Oklahoma and Gulf Railway, in receivership from June 7, 1924, until May 1, 1926.
- July 1: The Illinois Central Railroad acquires control of the Gulf and Ship Island Railroad.
- November 5: Western Pacific Railroad subsidiary Sacramento Northern Railway acquires the property of the electric Sacramento Northern Railroad. (The Sacramento Northern Railroad had replaced the Northern Electric Railway in 1918.)
- December 31: The San Antonio, Uvalde and Gulf Railroad, acquired by Missouri Pacific Railroad subsidiary New Orleans, Texas and Mexico Railway on December 1, leaves a receivership that began on August 14, 1914.

1926

- The Springfield, Havana and Peoria Railroad takes over a portion of the former Chicago, Peoria and St. Louis Railroad, in receivership since July 31, 1914, and leases it to the Chicago and Illinois Midland Railway, which becomes Class I.
- January 1: The Pennsylvania Railroad creates lessor Pennsylvania, Ohio and Detroit Railroad by merging other lessors, including former Class I railroads Cincinnati, Lebanon and Northern Railway and Cleveland, Akron and Cincinnati Railway.
- May: The Baltimore and Ohio Railroad gains control of the Cincinnati, Indianapolis and Western Railroad, whose predecessor had been leased to B&O subsidiary Cincinnati, Hamilton and Dayton Railway until 1915.
- June 1: The Yazoo and Mississippi Valley Railroad, subsidiary of the Illinois Central Railroad, leases the Alabama and Vicksburg Railway and Vicksburg, Shreveport and Pacific Railway.
- June 1: The Canadian Pacific Railway leases the lines of the Boston and Maine Railroad subsidiaries Connecticut and Passumpsic Rivers Railroad and Massawippi Valley Railway between Wells River and Sherbrooke. (North of Newport the lease is assigned to CP subsidiary Quebec Central Railway.) Along with the CP's operation under lease of the connecting Newport and Richford Railroad, also controlled by the B&M, and of the short Midland Railroad (later abandoned), these "Canadian Pacific Lines in Vermont" become Class I in 1927.

1927

- January 1: The Atlanta, Birmingham and Coast Railroad, subsidiary of the Atlantic Coast Line Railroad, begins operating the former Atlanta, Birmingham and Atlantic Railway, in receivership since February 25, 1921.
- January 1: The Central New England Railway is merged into parent New York, New Haven and Hartford Railroad.
- January 1: The Denver and Salt Lake Railway begins operating the former Denver and Salt Lake Railroad, in receivership since August 16, 1917.
- January 1: The Georgia and Florida Railroad begins operating the former Georgia and Florida Railway, in receivership since March 27, 1915.
- January 1: The Baltimore and Ohio Railroad buys a one-third share in the Monongahela Railway, formerly owned jointly by the Pennsylvania Railroad and New York Central Railroad subsidiary Pittsburgh and Lake Erie Railroad.
- March 1: The Southern Pacific Company leases subsidiaries Galveston, Harrisburg and San Antonio Railway, Houston East and West Texas Railway, Houston and Texas Central Railroad, Louisiana Western Railroad, Morgan's Louisiana and Texas Railroad and Steamship Company, and GH&SA lessor San Antonio and Aransas Pass Railway to Texas subsidiary Texas and New Orleans Railroad.
- April 1: The new independent Toledo, Peoria and Western Railroad acquires the property of the former Toledo, Peoria and Western Railway, owned jointly by the Chicago, Burlington and Quincy Railroad and Pennsylvania Company and in receivership since July 2, 1917.
- May 30: The Baltimore and Ohio Railroad leases subsidiary Cincinnati, Indianapolis and Western Railroad.

1928

- The Pennsylvania Railroad buys control of the Lehigh Valley Railroad and Wabash Railway.
- January 1: The Illinois Power and Light Corporation, which controls the electric Illinois Traction System, acquires the Illinois Terminal Company and leases several subsidiaries to the IT, which becomes Class I.
- January 14: The Chicago, Milwaukee, St. Paul and Pacific Railroad begins operating the former Chicago, Milwaukee and St. Paul Railway, in receivership since March 18, 1925.
- November 1: The Canadian National Railway consolidates ten of its U.S. subsidiaries to form the Grand Trunk Western Railroad. These subsidiaries include the Class I Grand Trunk Western Railway, Detroit, Grand Haven and Milwaukee Railway, and Chicago, Detroit and Canada Grand Trunk Junction Railroad, the latter actually operated under lease by the CN but reported separately.
- November 28: Existing Pennsylvania Railroad subsidiary Baltimore and Eastern Railroad (not Class I), successor to part of the Maryland, Delaware and Virginia Railway, acquires the property of former Pennsylvania subsidiary Baltimore, Chesapeake and Atlantic Railway.

1929

- The Missouri Pacific Railroad gains control of the Missouri-Illinois Railroad, which also becomes Class I this year.
- The Muskogee Company, owner of the Midland Valley Railroad and Kansas, Oklahoma and Gulf Railway, buys the Oklahoma City-Ada-Atoka Railway.
- January 1: The Louisiana and Arkansas Railway leases the Louisiana Railway and Navigation Company.
- January 1: The Reading Company leases subsidiaries Perkiomen Railroad and Port Reading Railroad.
- January 17: The Southern Pacific Company gains full control of the Northwestern Pacific Railroad by purchasing the Atchison, Topeka and Santa Fe Railway's one-half share.
- June 1: The Louisville and Nashville Railroad leases subsidiary Louisville, Henderson and St. Louis Railway.
- October 19: The Atchison, Topeka and Santa Fe Railway purchases the Kansas City, Mexico and Orient Railway and subsidiary Kansas City, Mexico and Orient Railway of Texas, and leases the former directly and the latter to Texas subsidiary Panhandle and Santa Fe Railway.
