= Timeline of Class I railroads (1977–present) =

Timeline of Class I railroads
1910–1929 • 1930–1976 • 1977–present

The following is a brief history of the North American rail system, mainly through major changes to Class I railroads, the largest class by operating revenue.

1977

- The Virginia and Maryland Railroad replaces Conrail on most of the old New York, Philadelphia and Norfolk Railroad. Operations are transferred to the Eastern Shore Railroad in 1981 and to the Bay Coast Railroad in 2006.
- October 1: The Michigan Interstate Railway (Class I) begins operating on the former route of the Ann Arbor Railroad. They take over from Conrail on tracks owned by the state of Michigan.
- December 1: The number of Class I railroads goes up by one, from 58 to 59, due to the start-up of the Michigan Interstate Railway.

1978

- April 1: Crown corporation Via Rail Canada takes over operations of intercity passenger trains from the Canadian National Railway and Canadian Pacific Ltd.
- October 24: The Penn Central Corporation emerges from reorganization as a real estate company. It has given up its one-sixth share of the Richmond, Fredericksburg and Potomac Railroad.
- November 1: The Missouri-Illinois Railroad is merged into parent Missouri Pacific Railroad.
- December 31: The ICC raises the minimum operating revenue from $10 million to $50 million effective January 1, 1978, dropping seventeen railroads to Class II:
  - Bangor and Aroostook Railroad
  - Canadian Pacific Lines in Maine
  - Central Vermont Railway (Canadian National Railway subsidiary)
  - Chicago and Illinois Midland Railway
  - Detroit and Toledo Shore Line Railroad
  - Duluth, Winnipeg and Pacific Railway (Canadian National Railway subsidiary)
  - Georgia Railroad (Seaboard Coast Line Railroad subsidiary)
  - Georgia Southern and Florida Railway (Southern Railway subsidiary)
  - Illinois Terminal Railroad
  - Maine Central Railroad
  - Michigan Interstate Railway
  - Missouri-Illinois Railroad (Missouri Pacific Railroad subsidiary)
  - Norfolk Southern Railway (Southern Railway subsidiary)
  - Northwestern Pacific Railroad (Southern Pacific Transportation Company subsidiary)
  - Richmond, Fredericksburg and Potomac Railroad
  - Texas Mexican Railway
  - Toledo, Peoria and Western Railroad
  - The Auto-Train Corporation and National Railroad Passenger Corporation (Amtrak) are also removed from the list, which now only includes freight carriers, reducing the number of Class I railroads from 59 at the end of 1977 to 40 as of December 31, 1978.

1979

- The Spokane, Portland and Seattle Railway is dissolved, its property going to lessee Burlington Northern Inc.
- November 1: The San Diego Metropolitan Transit Development Board purchases control of the San Diego and Arizona Eastern Railway (no longer Class I) from parent Southern Pacific Transportation Company, which continues to operate east of Plaster City. Freight service west of Plaster City will be operated by several companies, most recently the Carrizo Gorge Railway and San Diego and Imperial Valley Railroad.

1980

- The Colorado and Wyoming Railway (no longer Class I) abandons its operations in Wyoming.
- March 1: The Chicago, Milwaukee, St. Paul and Pacific Railroad, in trusteeship since February 13, 1978, abandons all operations west of Miles City, Montana. Very little of this trackage is taken over by other railroads.
- March 31: After a bankruptcy that started on March 17, 1975, and directed operation by the Kansas City Terminal Railway since October 5, 1979, the Chicago, Rock Island and Pacific Railroad shuts down entirely. Over the next few years, other railroads will buy large portions of the Rock Island's system, most notably the Iowa Interstate Railroad (Chicago-Council Bluffs), Chicago and North Western Transportation Company (Spine Line), Missouri-Kansas-Texas Railroad subsidiary Oklahoma, Kansas and Texas Railroad (OKT Line), and Southern Pacific Transportation Company subsidiary St. Louis Southwestern Railway (Tucumcari Line). The Fort Worth and Denver Railway (Chicago, Burlington and Quincy Railroad system) becomes sole owner of the Joint Texas Division, formerly owned by the Burlington-Rock Island Railroad until 1964 and then equally by the two companies.
- June 24: The Grand Trunk Western Railroad buys control of the Detroit, Toledo and Ironton Railroad from the Penn Central Corporation.
- September 2: The New York, Susquehanna and Western Railway begins operating the former New York, Susquehanna and Western Railroad (no longer Class I), which filed for bankruptcy in January 1976.
- November 1: Chessie System, Inc. and Seaboard Coast Line Industries merge to form the CSX Corporation, parent of the Atlanta and West Point Railroad (no longer Class I), Baltimore and Ohio Railroad, Chesapeake and Ohio Railway, Clinchfield Railroad, Georgia Railroad, Louisville and Nashville Railroad, Seaboard Coast Line Railroad, Staten Island Railroad (no longer Class I), Western Railway of Alabama (no longer Class I), and Western Maryland Railway.
- November 21: The St. Louis-San Francisco Railway merges into Burlington Northern Inc.

1981

- Burlington Northern Inc. merges subsidiaries Oregon Electric Railway (no longer Class I) and Oregon Trunk Railway (never Class I) into a new subsidiary, Burlington Northern (Oregon-Washington), Inc.
- January 12: The Atchison, Topeka and Santa Fe Railway acquires full control of the Toledo, Peoria and Western Railroad (no longer Class I) by buying the Penn Central Corporation's 50% share.
- April 13: The Grand Trunk Western Railroad gains control of the Detroit and Toledo Shore Line Railroad (no longer Class I) by buying the 50% share owned by the Norfolk and Western Railway.
- April 30: The Auto-Train Corporation (no longer Class I) ceases operations. Amtrak's Auto Train replacement will begin on October 30, 1983.
- May 14: Burlington Northern Inc. is renamed Burlington Northern Railroad.
- June 8: The Quanah, Acme and Pacific Railway (no longer Class I) merges into parent Burlington Northern Railroad.
- June 16: Guilford Transportation Industries purchases the Maine Central Railroad (no longer Class I).
- August: The Hooper-Myron Corporation, an affiliate of the Kankakee, Beaverville and Southern Railroad (not Class I), buys a portion of the old Chicago, Terre Haute and Southeastern Railway (ex-Chicago Southern Railway) between Hooper and Danville, Illinois from the Chicago, Milwaukee, St. Paul and Pacific Railroad. The rest of the old Chicago Southern has been abandoned, while the remnant of the CTH&SE in Indiana was sold in 2006 to the Indiana Rail Road.
- September 1: The Norfolk and Western Railway acquires the property of the Illinois Terminal Railroad (no longer Class I), formerly controlled jointly by 11 railroads (two of which were part of the N&W system).
- October 1: The Detroit and Toledo Shore Line Railroad (no longer Class I) is merged into parent Grand Trunk Western Railroad.
- December 31: The Colorado and Southern Railway is merged into parent Burlington Northern Railroad.

1982

- In preparation for common control with the Norfolk and Western Railway by the Norfolk Southern Corporation, Southern Railway subsidiary Norfolk Southern Railway (no longer Class I) is renamed Carolina and Northwestern Railway, a company it had merged with in 1974.
- The Providence and Worcester Railroad (not Class I) expands its operations to include Amtrak's Northeast Corridor between Pawtucket, Rhode Island and Old Saybrook, Connecticut, a former main line of the New York, New Haven and Hartford Railroad and most recently Conrail. In 1991 these freight rights are extended from Old Saybrook to East Haven.
- The New York, Susquehanna and Western Railway (no longer Class I) buys several lines from Conrail. This includes most of the old Syracuse, Binghamton and New York Railroad and a piece of the old Lehigh and Hudson River Railway between Sparta, New Jersey and Warwick, New York. After the NYS&W rehabilitates its trackage between Butler and Sparta, the latter becomes part of its main line in 1986.
- January 1: The Akron, Canton and Youngstown Railroad (no longer Class I) is merged into the Norfolk and Western Railway, its owner since 1964.
- February 20: Chesapeake and Ohio Railway (C&O) ceased operations and abandoned the railroad line connecting Manistee, Traverse City, and Petoskey. The segments from Grawn to Williamsburg and Charlevoix to Petoskey were subsequently acquired by the state of Michigan and operated under the Michigan Northern Railway (MIGN). The MIGN was later absorbed by the Tuscola and Saginaw Railway, which assumed responsibility for the aforementioned sections.
- March 31: The Chicago, Milwaukee, St. Paul and Pacific Railroad, in trusteeship since February 13, 1978, abandons all operations west of Ortonville, Minnesota. The Burlington Northern Railroad takes over operations on much of this trackage.
- June 1: The Norfolk Southern Corporation takes control of the Norfolk and Western Railway and Southern Railway.
- June: The Soo Line Railroad gains control of the Minneapolis, Northfield and Southern Railway (no longer Class I).
- October: The Michigan Interstate Railway (no longer Class I) discontinues operations on the former Ann Arbor Railroad north of Ann Arbor. The Tuscola and Saginaw Bay Railway takes over from Ann Arbor north to Alma, and the Michigan Northern Railway operates the remainder to Frankfort until 1983, when it too goes to the T&SB. The latter company is renamed Great Lakes Central Railroad in 2006.
- November 4: The Seaboard Coast Line Railroad acquires the rail assets of the Georgia Railroad and Banking Company, and absorbs lessee Georgia Railroad (no longer Class I), jointly controlled by the SCL and subsidiary Louisville and Nashville Railroad.
- December 22: The Union Pacific Railroad gains control of the Missouri Pacific Railroad and Western Pacific Railroad.
- December 31: The Fort Worth and Denver Railway is merged into parent Burlington Northern Railroad.

1983

- The Tuscola and Saginaw Bay Railway (renamed Great Lakes Central Railroad in 2006), which operates the old Ann Arbor Railroad between Ann Arbor and Alma, expands its operations north to Frankfort and on ex-Grand Rapids and Indiana Railway trackage north of Cadillac, replacing the Michigan Northern Railway.
- The Montour Railroad (no longer Class I) ceases operations.
- The Nevada Northern Railway (no longer Class I) ceases operations. The Northern Nevada Railroad will resume freight service in January 1995, but in June 1996 the BHP Nevada Railroad will take over until July 1999, when freight is again discontinued.
- January 1: The CSX Corporation merges subsidiaries Seaboard Coast Line Railroad and Louisville and Nashville Railroad to form the Seaboard System Railroad.
- February 11: The Clinchfield Railroad, an unincorporated entity organized jointly by the Atlantic Coast Line Railroad and subsidiary Louisville and Nashville Railroad to operate the Carolina, Clinchfield and Ohio Railway under lease, is dissolved, as both lessees have merged into the Seaboard System Railroad.
- May 1: The Baltimore and Ohio Railroad begins operating the lines of subsidiary Western Maryland Railway.
- May 31: The New Orleans Great Northern Railway merges into lessee Illinois Central Gulf Railroad.
- July 1: Guilford Transportation Industries purchases the Boston and Maine Corporation, bankrupt since March 1970.
- August 1: The Anthracite Railway replaces Conrail as operator of the former Reading Company (ex-Perkiomen Railroad) line between Emmaus and Pennsburg. The lines will be taken over by the Blue Mountain and Reading Railroad in mid-1988 and East Penn Railways (now East Penn Railroad) on July 1, 1995.
- December: The Detroit, Toledo and Ironton Railroad merges into parent Grand Trunk Western Railroad.
- December 30: The Norfolk, Franklin and Danville Railway (not Class I), successor to the Atlantic and Danville Railway, merges into parent Norfolk and Western Railway.
- December 31: The Toledo, Peoria and Western Railroad (no longer Class I) merges into parent Atchison, Topeka and Santa Fe Railway.

1984

- January 4: Guilford Transportation Industries purchases the Delaware and Hudson Railway from Norfolk and Western Railway subsidiary Dereco, Inc.
- January 19: The St. Louis Southwestern Railway of Texas merges into lessee St. Louis Southwestern Railway.
- March: The Fonda, Johnstown and Gloversville Railroad, not Class I since 1919, ceases operations.
- July: The Louisville, Henderson and St. Louis Railway merges into lessee Seaboard System Railroad.
- November 1: Southern Pacific Transportation Company subsidiary Northwestern Pacific Railroad (no longer Class I) sells its lines north of Willits to the Eureka Southern Railroad; the North Coast Rail Authority will buy that company's property on April 1, 1992.
- December 31: The Bessemer and Lake Erie Railroad, Duluth, Missabe and Iron Range Railway, and Pittsburgh and Lake Erie Railroad are demoted to Class II, leaving 28 Class I railroads.

1985

- Burlington Northern (Oregon-Washington), Inc. merges into parent Burlington Northern Railroad.
- February 19: Soo Line Railroad subsidiary The Milwaukee Road, Inc. acquires the property of the Chicago, Milwaukee, St. Paul and Pacific Railroad, in trusteeship since February 13, 1978.
- March 1: The Indiana and Ohio Railway (not Class I) takes over from Conrail on a piece of the former Cincinnati, Lebanon and Northern Railway; another segment will be transferred on December 19, 1986.
- May 1: The Rarus Railway begins operating the former Butte, Anaconda and Pacific Railway (no longer Class I). The name will be changed back to BA&P on July 19, 2007.
- July: The Gulf and Mississippi Railroad (not Class I) buys a number of lines from the Illinois Central Gulf Railroad, including most of the old Gulf, Mobile and Northern Railroad (ICG retains Mobile-Hattiesburg) and the former Mobile and Ohio Railroad south of Corinth (including a branch to Tuscaloosa). MidSouth Rail Corporation subsidiary SouthRail Corporation will take over in April 1988. After the Kansas City Southern Railway takes control in 1993, it will dispose of portions, including the ex-M&O Tuscaloosa branch (to the Alabama Southern Railroad), ex-M&O Meridian-Waynesboro (to the Meridian Southern Railway), and ex-GM&N Houston-Middleton (to the Mississippi and Tennessee RailNet).
- October: Washouts west of Petoskey on former C&O line between Petoskey and Charlevoix, Which cause Michigan Northern Railway to abandon the line
- December: The Chicago Central and Pacific Railroad (not Class I) buys the Illinois Central Gulf Railroad's Chicago-Omaha main line and branches.
- December 31: With the demise of the Chicago, Milwaukee, St. Paul and Pacific Railroad, and the Southern Railway's decision to combine its subsidiaries in its report to the ICC (including Class I Alabama Great Southern Railroad, Central of Georgia Railroad, and Cincinnati, New Orleans and Texas Pacific Railway), the number of Class I railroads drops to 24.

1986

- January 1: The Milwaukee Road, Inc. and Minneapolis, Northfield and Southern Railway merge into parent Soo Line Railroad.
- March 18: The Indiana Rail Road (not Class I) begins operating most of the former Indianapolis Southern Railroad, purchased from successor Illinois Central Gulf Railroad.
- March 31: The MidSouth Rail Corporation (not Class I) acquires lines from the Illinois Central Gulf Railroad, including the former Alabama and Vicksburg Railway and Vicksburg, Shreveport and Pacific Railway between Meridian and Shreveport, and a portion of the old Gulf and Ship Island Railroad between Gulfport and Hattiesburg.
- June 30: The Atlanta and West Point Railroad (no longer Class I) merges into the Seaboard System Railroad, whose predecessors have controlled it since 1920.
- July 1: CSX Corporation subsidiary Seaboard System Railroad is renamed CSX Transportation.
- July 21: The Rochester and Southern Railroad begins operations on a portion of CSX Transportation lessor Buffalo, Rochester and Pittsburgh Railway's line to Rochester.
- August 27: The Paducah and Louisville Railway (not Class I) begins operations on a line in Kentucky bought from the Illinois Central Gulf Railroad.
- September: The Dakota, Minnesota and Eastern Railroad (not Class I) buys the Chicago and North Western Transportation Company's line between Rapid City, South Dakota and Winona, Minnesota.
- September 15: The Nashville and Eastern Railroad (not Class I) replaces CSX Transportation on the remaining piece of the Tennessee Central Railway sold to the Louisville and Nashville Railroad in 1968, from Nashville to Monterey.
- December 8: The Winchester and Western Railroad (not Class I) takes over the old Cumberland Valley and Martinsburg Railroad from Conrail.
- December 31: The Elgin, Joliet and Eastern Railway drops to Class II. CSX Transportation, the Norfolk Southern Corporation, and the Union Pacific Railroad begin submitting combined reports for all subsidiaries, thus removing the Baltimore and Ohio Railroad, Chesapeake and Ohio Railway, Seaboard System Railroad, Southern Railway, Norfolk and Western Railway, Western Pacific Railroad, and Missouri Pacific Railroad from the list of Class I railroads, now numbering 18.

1987

- March 26: The stock of government-owned Conrail is sold to private investors.
- April 28: The Chicago, Missouri and Western Railway (not Class I) acquires almost all of the former Alton Railroad from the Illinois Central Gulf Railroad. It will declare bankruptcy in less than a year.
- April 30: The Baltimore and Ohio Railroad merges into the Chesapeake and Ohio Railway, which has controlled it since 1963.
- June 15: The Sacramento Northern Railway is merged into parent Western Pacific Railroad.
- June 16: The Western Pacific Railroad merges into parent Union Pacific Railroad.
- August 31: The Chesapeake and Ohio Railway merges into CSX Transportation.
- October 11: Wisconsin Central Ltd. (not Class I) acquires Canadian Pacific Ltd. subsidiary Soo Line Railroad's Lake States Transportation Division, including most of the remaining trackage east of Minneapolis-St. Paul formerly belonging to the Duluth, South Shore and Atlantic Railroad, Minneapolis, St. Paul and Sault Ste. Marie Railroad, and Wisconsin Central Railroad, which merged in 1961 to form the Soo. (The Soo had acquired the Chicago, Milwaukee, St. Paul and Pacific Railroad in 1985, and chose to retain those lines east of the Twin Cities. Several Milwaukee Road branches were also included in the WC sale.)
- October 31: The Montana Rail Link leases the former Northern Pacific Railway main line across Montana from the Burlington Northern Railroad.
- December 31: The Oregon Short Line Railroad, Oregon-Washington Railroad and Navigation Company, and Los Angeles and Salt Lake Railroad are merged into lessee Union Pacific Railroad, as is subsidiary Spokane International Railroad (no longer Class I).

1988

- February 23: The Illinois Central Gulf Railroad, which has sold off most of the former Gulf, Mobile and Ohio Railroad, is renamed Illinois Central Railroad.
- June 1: The Carolina and Northwestern Railway is merged into parent Southern Railway.
- June 20: Guilford Transportation Industries subsidiary Delaware and Hudson Railway files for bankruptcy. The New York, Susquehanna and Western Railway (formerly Class I) assumes temporary operation of the D&H.
- June 27: The Southern Railway acquires the Illinois Central Gulf Railroad's line between Fulton, Kentucky and Haleyville, Alabama, including a piece of the old Mobile and Ohio Railroad between Jackson and Corinth. The Redmont Railway will take over south of Corinth in 1995, and the West Tennessee Railroad, which already operates the ex-M&O north of Jackson, will lease the line from Fulton via Jackson to Corinth in 2001.
- July 19: The Buffalo and Pittsburgh Railroad (not Class I) acquires much of the former Buffalo, Rochester and Pittsburgh Railway, then leased to CSX Transportation, as well as the remnants of the former Buffalo and Susquehanna Railroad near DuBois. The BR&P remains a CSX subsidiary, though none of its lines have been operated by CSX since then.
- August 12: Union Pacific Railroad subsidiary Missouri Pacific Railroad acquires control of the Missouri-Kansas-Texas Railroad.
- September: New Canadian Pacific Ltd. subsidiary Canadian Atlantic Railway takes over all CP operations east of Megantic, Quebec, including the former International Railway of Maine.
- September 20: The Wheeling and Lake Erie Railway merges into lessee Norfolk and Western Railway.
- October 7: The new Ann Arbor Railroad (not Class I) begins operating the former Michigan Interstate Railway (pre-1976 Ann Arbor Railroad) south of Ann Arbor; that company had been bankrupt since January 1983.
- October 11: The Arizona Eastern Railway (not Class I) begins operations on the Bowie-Miami line of the former Arizona Eastern Railroad, purchased from successor Southern Pacific Transportation Company.
- October 13: Rio Grande Industries, parent of the Denver and Rio Grande Western Railroad, buys control of the Southern Pacific Transportation Company, including subsidiaries St. Louis Southwestern Railway and Northwestern Pacific Railroad (the latter no longer Class I). The Southern Pacific name is retained for the combined system.

1989

- January 9: The Western Maryland Railway is merged into lessee CSX Transportation, whose predecessors have controlled it since 1967.
- February 1: The Atchison, Topeka and Santa Fe Railway sells the former Toledo, Peoria and Western Railroad to a new Toledo, Peoria and Western Railway (not Class I).
- May 1: The Aberdeen, Carolina and Western Railway (not Class I) leases the former Norfolk Southern Railway west of Gulf, North Carolina from the Southern Railway.
- May 19: The St. Lawrence and Atlantic Railroad buys the former Atlantic and St. Lawrence Railroad from the Canadian National Railway. In 1998, affiliate St. Lawrence and Atlantic Railroad (Quebec) will replace CN on the portion of the line in Canada.
- August: The Elk River Railroad (not Class I) buys an out-of service portion of the former Coal and Coke Railway from CSX Transportation.
- November 8: Southern Pacific Transportation Company subsidiary SPCSL Corporation acquires the east half of the old Alton Railroad from the bankrupt (since April 1, 1988) Chicago, Missouri and Western Railway (not Class I).
- December 1: The Missouri-Kansas-Texas Railroad merges into parent Missouri Pacific Railroad.
- December 31: The Boston and Maine Corporation and Delaware and Hudson Railway are demoted from Class I; combined with the demise of the Missouri-Kansas-Texas Railroad, this drops the number of Class I railroads to 15.

1990

- CSX Transportation subsidiary Staten Island Railroad ends freight service. Conrail will reactivate the line in 2007.
- January: The Gateway Western Railway (not Class I) acquires the remainder of the old Alton Railroad from the bankrupt (since April 1, 1988) Chicago, Missouri and Western Railway (not Class I). Through a haulage agreement, it gives the Atchison, Topeka and Santa Fe Railway access to St. Louis.
- April 2: The Chesapeake and Albemarle Railroad (not Class I) leases the former Norfolk Southern Railway east of Edenton, North Carolina from the Southern Railway.
- May 17: The new Wheeling and Lake Erie Railway (not Class I) acquires lines from the Norfolk and Western Railway, including most of the former Akron, Canton and Youngstown Railroad (merged 1982) and Wheeling and Lake Erie Railway (merged 1988), as well as the lease of the Pittsburgh and West Virginia Railroad.
- June 29: The Carolina, Clinchfield and Ohio Railway is merged into lessee CSX Transportation.
- October: The Cincinnati, Indianapolis and Western Railroad is merged into lessee CSX Transportation.
- October: The Indiana and Ohio Central Railroad (not Class I) begins operating a portion of the old Detroit, Toledo and Ironton Railroad between Washington Court House and Springfield, Ohio, purchased from Canadian National Railway subsidiary Grand Trunk Western Railroad. Affiliated Indiana and Ohio Railway will acquire most of the remainder, from Springfield north to Diann, Michigan, in 1997; GTW retains ownership between Diann and Detroit.
- November: Conrail acquires full control of the Monongahela Railway (no longer Class I) by buying the one-third shares owned by CSX Transportation and the Pittsburgh and Lake Erie Railroad.
- December 15: The Reading Blue Mountain and Northern Railroad (not Class I) begins operations over most of the remaining Reading Company lines north of Reading, which they bought from Conrail.
- December 31: The Southern Railway acquires direct control of the Norfolk and Western Railway from parent Norfolk Southern Corporation, and is renamed Norfolk Southern Railway.

1991

- January: Canadian Pacific Ltd. purchases the bankrupt Delaware and Hudson Railway.
- January 14: The Wichita, Tillman and Jackson Railway begins operations on the remaining piece of the old Wichita Falls and Northwestern Railway between Wichita Falls and Altus, bought from successor Missouri-Kansas-Texas Railroad.
- June 1: The Texas and Oklahoma Railroad (not Class I) buys the old Kansas City, Mexico and Orient Railway and Kansas City, Mexico and Orient Railway of Texas between Thomas, Oklahoma and Maryneal, Texas from successor Atchison, Topeka and Santa Fe Railway. Farmrail will take over the portion in Oklahoma in January 1993, and the T&O will later abandon all but Sweetwater-Maryneal.
- October 10: The railroad properties of the Richmond, Fredericksburg and Potomac Railroad (no longer Class I) are conveyed to new CSX Transportation subsidiary Richmond, Fredericksburg and Potomac Railway. CSX had owned an 80% share in the RF&P, the other 20% being the Norfolk Southern Railway's.
- November 12: The Wabash Railroad merges into lessee Norfolk and Western Railway.

1992

- January 2: The South Orient Railroad (not Class I) begins operating portions of the former Fort Worth and Rio Grande Railway and Kansas City, Mexico and Orient Railway of Texas, bought from successor Atchison, Topeka and Santa Fe Railway, between Santa Anna, Texas and the Mexican border. Texas Pacifico Transportation will replace the South Orient in 2000.
- February 17: The Lake State Railway takes over operation of the Detroit and Mackinac Railway (no longer Class I).
- April 11: Conrail sells the remnants of the Evansville, Indianapolis and Terre Haute Railway (except at Terre Haute), and a former Vandalia Railroad branch, to the Indiana Southern Railroad (not Class I).
- April 17: The Columbus and Ohio River Rail Road (not Class I) begins operations on the former Pittsburgh, Cincinnati, Chicago and St. Louis Railroad main line between Columbus and Steubenville, Ohio, sold by Conrail.
- July 6: The Louisiana and Arkansas Railway (no longer Class I) and Fort Smith and Van Buren Railway (never Class I, but successor to the Fort Smith and Western Railway) merge into parent Kansas City Southern Railway.
- September 13: CSX Transportation subsidiary Three Rivers Railway takes over the remaining trackage of the Pittsburgh and Lake Erie Railroad (no longer Class I).
- October 1: The Northwestern Pacific Railroad (no longer Class I) merges into parent Southern Pacific Transportation Company.
- December 21: San Joaquin Valley Railroad lessor Tulare Valley Railroad leases a portion of the property of the Sunset Railway (only Class I in 1911), a joint subsidiary of the Atchison, Topeka and Santa Fe Railway and Southern Pacific Transportation Company; the rest is abandoned.
- December 31: The Colorado and Wyoming Railway (no longer Class I) sells its Southern Division at Trinidad, Colorado to the Trinidad Railway (operated by the Atchison, Topeka and Santa Fe Railway and Denver and Rio Grande Western Railroad), leaving only the Middle Division at Pueblo.
- December 31: The ICC raises the minimum operating revenue to $250 million effective January 1, 1993, dropping the Florida East Coast Railroad to Class II.

1993

- May 1: The Monongahela Railway (no longer Class I) merges into parent Conrail.
- May 4: Rio Grande Industries, parent of the Denver and Rio Grande Western Railroad, Southern Pacific Transportation Company, and St. Louis Southwestern Railway, is renamed Southern Pacific Rail Corporation.
- June: Kansas City Southern Industries, parent of the Kansas City Southern Railway, acquires control of the MidSouth Corporation, parent of several non-Class I railroads: MidSouth Rail Corporation (former Alabama and Vicksburg Railway and Vicksburg, Shreveport and Pacific Railway), MidLouisiana Rail Corporation, SouthRail Corporation (former Gulf, Mobile and Northern Railroad and Mobile and Ohio Railroad), and TennRail Corporation.
- August 27: Wisconsin Central Ltd. (not Class I) subsidiary Fox Valley and Western Ltd. acquires the properties of the Green Bay and Western Railroad (formerly Class I), Fox River Valley Railroad (a 1988 Chicago and North Western Transportation Company shortline spin-off), and Ahnapee and Western Railway (never Class I).
- September 17: CSX Transportation takes over the operations of subsidiary Three Rivers Railway (ex-Pittsburgh and Lake Erie Railroad).
- September 26: Shortline California Northern Railroad replaces the Southern Pacific Transportation Company as operator of the former Northwestern Pacific Railroad.

1994

- January 1: The MidSouth Rail Corporation is merged into the Kansas City Southern Railway, its parent since June 1993.
- January 1: The Bay Line Railroad begins operating the former Atlanta and St. Andrews Bay Railway (no longer Class I).
- March 12: The Louisville and Indiana Railroad (not Class I) begins operating a former major branch of the Pittsburgh, Cincinnati, Chicago and St. Louis Railroad between Indianapolis and Louisville, sold by Conrail.
- May 20: South Orient Railroad affiliate Cen-Tex Rail Link (not Class I) begins operating most of the former Fort Worth and Rio Grande Railway, bought from successor Atchison, Topeka and Santa Fe Railway, between Fort Worth and Ricker, Texas. The Fort Worth and Western Railroad will take over in 1998.
- July 15: Service ends on the Cambria and Indiana Railroad (no longer Class I).
- December 31: Canadian Pacific Ltd. subsidiary Canadian American Railway, including the former International Railway of Maine, shuts down. Bangor and Aroostook Railroad affiliate Canadian American Railroad restores service west of McAdam, New Brunswick on January 6, 1995, and the New Brunswick Southern Railway begins operations between McAdam and St. Stephen on January 8. NBSR subsidiary Eastern Maine Railway takes over between Brownville Junction, Maine and McAdam on April 10, 1995.

1995

- February 4: The New England Central Railroad begins operating the property of Canadian National Railway subsidiary Central Vermont Railway (no longer Class I).
- September 22: The Burlington Northern Santa Fe Corporation acquires control of the Atchison, Topeka and Santa Fe Railway and Burlington Northern Railroad.
- October 1: The Chicago and North Western Transportation Company merges into the Union Pacific Railroad.
- October 1: The Portland and Western Railroad (not Class I) begins operating a portion of the old Oregon Electric Railway north of Salem, leased from successor Burlington Northern Railroad. In 2003 it will lease the rest of the old main line, from Salem south to Eugene.
- November 17: The Canadian National Railway is privatized.

1996

- February 9: The Illinois and Midland Railroad begins operating the property of the Chicago and Illinois Midland Railway (no longer Class I).
- June: The Illinois Central Railroad buys control of the Chicago Central and Pacific Railroad (not Class I), which it had spun off in 1985.
- July 4: Canadian Pacific Ltd. is renamed back to Canadian Pacific Railway, its name until 1971, and a new CP Ltd. takes over as holding company.
- August: Conrail sells its main line through the Scranton-Wilkes-Barre area, formerly Lehigh Valley Railroad and Central Railroad of New Jersey, to the Reading Blue Mountain and Northern Railroad (not Class I).
- September: The Connecticut Southern Railroad (not Class I) replaces Conrail as freight operator on Amtrak's New Haven-Springfield Line, one of the main lines of the old New York, New Haven and Hartford Railroad.
- September 11: Union Pacific Railroad parent Union Pacific Corporation takes control of Southern Pacific Rail Corporation subsidiaries Southern Pacific Transportation Company, St. Louis Southwestern Railway, and Denver and Rio Grande Western Railroad.
- September 28: Bangor and Aroostook Railroad affiliate Quebec Southern Railway and subsidiary Northern Vermont Railroad replace the Canadian Pacific Railway on several lines east of Saint-Jean-sur-Richelieu, Quebec, including the Newport and Richford Railroad to Wells River, Vermont.
- October 1: New Canadian Pacific Railway subsidiary St. Lawrence and Hudson Railway begins operating the portion of CP's network east and south of Toronto, including subsidiary Delaware and Hudson Railway.
- December 31: The Atchison, Topeka and Santa Fe Railway and Burlington Northern Railroad, both subsidiaries of the Burlington Northern Santa Fe Corporation, merge to form the Burlington Northern and Santa Fe Railway.

1997

- January 1: The Missouri Pacific Railroad merges into parent Union Pacific Railroad.
- April 5: Montana Rail Link affiliate I&M Rail Link (not Class I) begins operating former Chicago, Milwaukee, St. Paul and Pacific Railroad lines bought from Canadian Pacific Railway subsidiary Soo Line Railroad, with main lines stretching west from Chicago to Minneapolis-St. Paul, Sheldon, Iowa, and Kansas City.
- May 5: The Kansas City Southern Railway acquires control of the Gateway Western Railway (not Class I), which operates the west half of the former Alton Railroad.
- May 11: The New York and Atlantic Railway takes over freight operations on the primarily passenger-serving Long Island Rail Road (no longer Class I).
- June: Transportación Ferroviaria Mexicana, which would be Class I by U.S. standards, begins operating a portion of the government-owned Ferrocarriles Nacionales de México.
- June 30: The Denver and Rio Grande Western Railroad and SPCSL Corporation merge into parent Union Pacific Railroad.
- September 30: The St. Louis Southwestern Railway merges into parent Union Pacific Railroad.

1998

- February: The Canadian National Railway buys control of the Illinois Central Railroad.
- February 1: The Union Pacific is merged into the Southern Pacific Transportation Company and then renamed to Union Pacific Railroad.
- February 19: Ferrocarril Mexicano, which would be Class I by U.S. standards, begins operating a large portion of the government-owned Ferrocarriles Nacionales de México.
- August 22: CSX Transportation and the Norfolk Southern Railway acquire control of Conrail, owning respectively 42% and 58%, with equal voting rights.
- September 1: The Norfolk and Western Railway merges into parent Norfolk Southern Railway.

1999

- June 1: Most Conrail lines are sold to two new subsidiaries, New York Central Lines LLC and Pennsylvania Lines LLC, which are leased to CSX Transportation and the Norfolk Southern Railway respectively. In three Shared Assets Areas, Conrail retains ownership, and operates as a contract carrier on behalf of CSX and NS.

2000

2001

- January 1: The St. Lawrence and Hudson Railway merges into parent Canadian Pacific Railway, from which it was split in 1996, making the Delaware and Hudson Railway again a direct CP subsidiary.
- April 23: The Western New York and Pennsylvania Railroad (not Class I) begins operating the old Erie Railroad main line between Hornell, New York and Corry, Pennsylvania, sold by the Norfolk Southern Railway. In January 2002 it extends operations on the ex-Erie from Corry to Meadville, on which Oil Creek and Titusville Lines, Inc. had replaced Conrail in 1995.
- October 1: The Gateway Western Railway is merged into the Kansas City Southern Railway, its parent since 1997.
- October 9: The Canadian National Railway acquires control of Wisconsin Central Ltd. (not Class I) and subsidiaries, including Fox Valley and Western Ltd., successor to the Green Bay and Western Railroad.

2002

- July 31: Dakota, Minnesota and Eastern Railroad subsidiary Iowa, Chicago and Eastern Railroad (not Class I) begins operations after buying the I&M Rail Link's property.
- December 3: The Western Railway of Alabama merges into parent CSX Transportation.

2003

- January 9: The Montreal, Maine and Atlantic Railway begins operating the former Bangor and Aroostook Railroad (no longer Class I) and affiliates Canadian American Railroad (ex-International Railway of Maine west of Brownville Junction), Quebec Southern Railway, and Northern Vermont Railroad (Newport and Richford Railroad) north of Newport. South of Newport, the Washington County Railroad takes over.

2004

- January 1: The Buffalo and Pittsburgh Railroad (not Class I) leases the Pittsburg and Shawmut Railroad (no longer Class I).
- May: The Canadian National Railway takes control of the Bessemer and Lake Erie Railroad and Duluth, Missabe and Iron Range Railway, both former Class I railroads.
- August: The Chicago, Fort Wayne and Eastern Railroad leases from CSX Transportation the old Pittsburgh, Fort Wayne and Chicago Railway (Pennsylvania Company lessor) main line west of Crestline, Ohio.
- August 27: Conrail subsidiaries New York Central Lines LLC and Pennsylvania Lines LLC are merged into their lessees (and parents of Conrail), CSX Transportation and the Norfolk Southern Railway respectively.

2005

- January 1: The Kansas City Southern Railway takes control of the Texas Mexican Railway (no longer Class I).
- January 24: The Burlington Northern and Santa Fe Railway is renamed BNSF Railway.
- March 25: The Appalachian and Ohio Railroad (not Class I) leases ex-Baltimore and Ohio Railroad trackage from CSX Transportation, including a portion of the old Coal and Coke Railway.
- September 25: The Kansas City Southern Railway leases the remaining pieces of the original Louisiana and Arkansas Railway (i.e. not the Louisiana Railway and Navigation Company) to the Louisiana Southern Railroad.
- December: The Kansas City Southern Railway takes control of Transportación Ferroviaria Mexicana and renames it Kansas City Southern de México.

2006

- May 27: The Indiana Rail Road (not Class I) takes over the remaining portion of the old Chicago, Terre Haute and Southeastern Railway (ex-Southern Indiana Railway) still owned by Canadian Pacific Railway subsidiary Soo Line Railroad, between Terre Haute and Bedford.

2007

- June: The Carolina Coastal Railway (not Class I) leases the former Norfolk Southern Railway between Raleigh and Plymouth, North Carolina from the current Norfolk Southern Railway.

2008

- March: The Arizona Eastern Railway (not Class I) buys the former Arizona and New Mexico Railway from successor Union Pacific Railroad.
- October 30: The Canadian Pacific Railway takes control of the Dakota, Minnesota and Eastern Railroad and subsidiary Iowa, Chicago and Eastern Railroad, the latter consisting of trackage spun off by the CP in 1997.

2009

- February 1: The Canadian National Railway takes control of the Elgin, Joliet and Eastern Railway (no longer Class I).
- March 8: The Grand Elk Railroad (not Class I) leases the old Grand Rapids and Indiana Railway between Grand Rapids and Kalamazoo from the Norfolk Southern Railway.

2021

- March 21: The Canadian Pacific Railway announces intentions to purchase Kansas City Southern for US$29 billion. This was followed by a counter-offer from the Canadian National Railway for US$33.7 billion, which the Surface Transportation Board (STB) blocked in August of that year due to concerns about competition, owing to Canadian National's ownership of the Illinois Central.
