= STLB =

STLB or sTLB may refer to:

- Second-level or shared translation lookaside buffer (sTLB), introduced in the Intel Nehalem microarchitecture
- St. Louis Blues, an ice hockey team in St. Louis, Missouri, US

== See also ==
- St. Louis, Brownsville and Mexico Railway (STLB&M), a defunct American railway in Texas, US
