= AKDN =

AKDN may refer to:

- Acadiana Railway, a short line railroad based in Opelousas, Louisiana, US
- Aga Khan Development Network, a multinational network of development agencies for humanity
