= Article X of the Texas Constitution =

Article X of the Texas Constitution of 1876 covers railroad companies and the creation of the Railroad Commission of Texas. The federal government later created the Interstate Commerce Commission to regulate railroads, and eight of the nine sections (all but section 2) of Article X were repealed in 1969 as "deadwood".

== Sections ==
Section 1 gave companies the right to build railroads in Texas and to connect with others at the state line, and the responsibility to act as a common carrier, transporting passengers and freight "without delay or discrimination".

Section 2 expands on the common-carrier provisions of section 1, and charges the legislature with passing laws to enforce this. It was amended in 1890 to allow the legislature to delegate this responsibility to an agency, leading to the creation of the Railroad Commission of Texas in 1891. Section 2 is the only one to be successfully amended, and the only one that was not repealed in 1969 (notwithstanding that the Surface Transportation Board has jurisdiction over all common-carrier railroads in the US, even those physically located within only one state, and that the section has little force of law).

Section 3 required every railroad operating in Texas to maintain an office in the state.

Section 4 classified rolling stock as personal property.

Section 5 prohibited the consolidation or common control of parallel railroads for anti-competitive purposes. The Southern Pacific Company was required to give up control of the San Antonio and Aransas Pass Railway due to this section.

Section 6 prohibited the consolidation of railroads organized in Texas with those organized outside the state.

Section 7 required the consent of local authorities before a street railway can be chartered.

Section 8 required pre-existing railroad companies to accept Article X in order to benefit from future legislation.

Section 9 required any railroad that passes within 3 miles (4.8 km) of a county seat to pass through that seat if the citizens donated the right-of-way and land for a depot, unless topography prevented such a routing.

== Requirement for a Texas office ==
The legislature decided in 1853 that all railroads operating in Texas should be headquartered in the state, and that was included in the 1876 constitution as section 3 of Article X. When outside companies began acquiring control of Texas railroads in the 1880s, they were required to retain the Texas corporations. Since only Texas companies could operate in the state, the outside companies could not lease the Texas companies, as decided by the courts in an 1888 lawsuit brought by Attorney General James S. Hogg against the railroads controlled by Jay Gould (International and Great Northern Railroad, Missouri, Kansas and Texas Railway, and Texas and Pacific Railway, all leased to the Missouri Pacific Railroad).

These separate Texas companies sometimes took the name of the parent, but often retained their original names. Systems that entered Texas and their local companies included:

- Atchison, Topeka and Santa Fe Railway: Gulf, Colorado and Santa Fe Railway, Panhandle and Santa Fe Railway
- Chicago, Rock Island and Pacific Railway: Chicago, Rock Island and Gulf Railway
- Colorado and Southern Railway: Fort Worth and Denver City Railway
- El Paso and Southwestern Company: El Paso and Southwestern Railroad of Texas
- Kansas City, Mexico and Orient Railroad: Kansas City, Mexico and Orient Railway of Texas
- Kansas City Southern Railway: Texarkana and Fort Smith Railway
- Louisiana Railway and Navigation Company: Louisiana Railway and Navigation Company of Texas
- Louisiana and Arkansas Railway: Louisiana, Arkansas and Texas Railway
- Missouri, Kansas and Texas Railway: Missouri, Kansas and Texas Railway of Texas
- Missouri, Oklahoma and Gulf Railway: Missouri, Oklahoma and Gulf Railway of Texas
- New Orleans, Texas and Mexico Railroad: Beaumont, Sour Lake and Western Railway, St. Louis, Brownsville and Mexico Railway
- St. Louis-San Francisco Railway: St. Louis, San Francisco and Texas Railway, Fort Worth and Rio Grande Railway
- St. Louis Southwestern Railway: St. Louis Southwestern Railway of Texas
- Southern Pacific Company: Galveston, Harrisburg and San Antonio Railway, Houston East and West Texas Railway, Houston and Texas Central Railroad, Texas and New Orleans Railroad
- Wichita Falls and Northwestern Railway: Wichita Falls and Northwestern Railway of Texas

The Interstate Commerce Commission approved a lease of the Texarkana and Fort Smith to the Kansas City Southern in 1933. Texas took the case to the Supreme Court but lost, and section 3 was effectively nullified. The Fort Worth and Denver, the last of the Texas subsidiaries, merged into the Burlington Northern Railroad in 1982.
