= Gulf Coast Lines =

Defunct American railway company

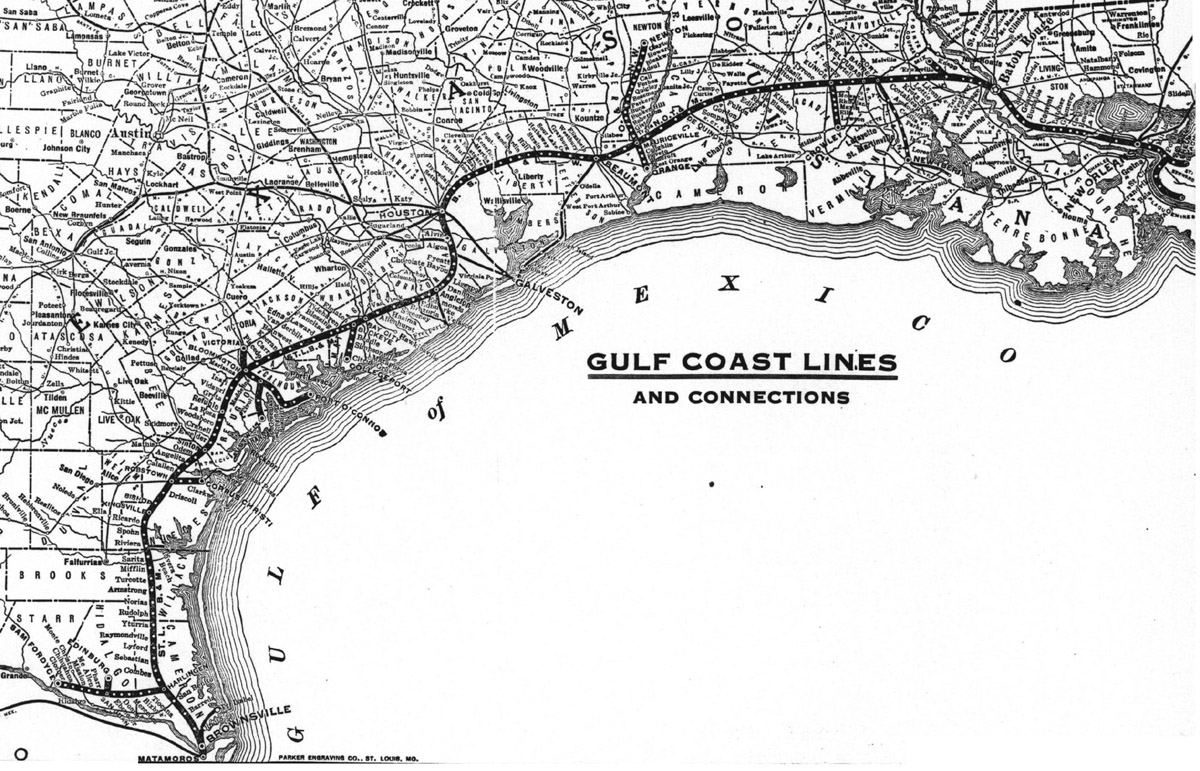
- Gulf Coast Lines system map, circa 1920

Overview
- Headquarters: New Orleans and Houston, Texas
- Locale: Louisiana and Texas
- Dates of operation: February 28, 1916–March 1, 1956
- Successor: Missouri Pacific Railroad

Technical
- Track gauge: 4 ft 8 1/2 in (1,435 mm) standard gauge

The Gulf Coast Lines was the name of a railroad system comprising three principal railroads, as well as some smaller ones, that stretched from New Orleans, Louisiana, via Baton Rouge and Houston to Brownsville, Texas. Originally chartered as subsidiaries of the Frisco Railroad, the system became independent in 1916 and was purchased by the Missouri Pacific Railroad in 1925.

The parent company of the independent Gulf Coast Lines was the New Orleans, Texas and Mexico Railway, incorporated in Louisiana on February 28, 1916, which bought the property and assets of the Frisco-owned New Orleans, Texas and Mexico Railroad. The NOT&M was headquartered in New Orleans, and owned or leased a number of other railroads in Louisiana and Texas, operating them all together as the Gulf Coast Lines. As of December 31, 1916, the total trackage operated by the Gulf Coast Lines system was 1,013 miles (1,630 km), including branches, sidings, trackage rights, and leased lines.

== Constituent railroads ==
=== Primary lines ===
According to a corporate history published in the 1950s by the Missouri Pacific Railroad,

The Gulf Coast Lines was projected originally by B. F. Yoakum, chairman of the board of the Rock Island and Frisco Lines. Yoakum's plan envisioned using the Rock Island and Frisco, together with.several railroads to be built in Texas and Louisiana and now known as the Gulf Coast Lines, to form a continuous line of railroad extending from Chicago, St. Louis and Memphis to Baton Rouge, Houston, Brownsville, Tampico and Mexico City.

The Frisco and Rock Island were conjoined under his leadership in 1905 and known as the "Yoakum Line."

The first section of the GCL was the St. Louis, Brownsville and Mexico Railway. Construction was done by the B.F. & P.M. Johnson Co. of St. Elmo, Illinois, which began in 1903 from Robstown, Texas (near Corpus Christi) to Brownsville, Texas. The line was opened for business on July 4, 1904. By the end of 1907, the StLB&M was extended to Houston, with trackage rights via the Gulf, Colorado and Santa Fe Railroad between Algoa and Houston. The railroad was the first to reach the Rio Grande Valley, where it had a great effect on the region. According to the Handbook of Texas Online,

The coming of the railroad and irrigation made the Valley into a major agricultural center. In Hidalgo County, land that had been selling for twenty-five cents an acre in 1903, the year before the St. Louis, Brownsville and Mexico Railway arrived, was selling for fifty dollars an acre in 1906 and for as much as $300 an acre by 1910.

In 1905, Yoakum purchased the Beaumont, Sour Lake and Western Railway, which connected with the StLB&M at Houston.

The next link eastward was the New Orleans, Texas and Mexico Railway, construction of which began in 1905 from Anchorage, Louisiana (opposite Baton Rouge), to DeQuincy, Louisiana, with trackage rights purchased from Kansas City Southern Railway from DeQuincy to Beaumont. NOT&M trains were ferried across the Mississippi River at Baton Rouge until 1947, several years after the Huey P. Long Bridge (carrying a highway and a railroad track) was built in 1940. This segment opened for service on September 1, 1909, with trackage rights via the Louisiana Railway and Navigation Company (later acquired by the Louisiana and Arkansas Railway) from Baton Rouge to New Orleans; after 1916, GCL trains used trackage rights on the parallel Illinois Central route instead.

Yoakum's planned extensions of the GCL from Brownsville to Tampico and Mexico City, as well as from Baton Rouge to Memphis, never materialized. In 1913, the Frisco and the GCL roads fell into bankruptcy, which was terminated in 1916 when Frisco's receivers were ordered by a court to sell the Texas-Louisiana lines. The StLB&M and the BSL&W were acquired by the New Orleans, Texas and Mexico, and operated under the Gulf Coast Lines name after that.

On June 30, 1924, the NOT&M bought the International-Great Northern Railroad, and in December of the same year, the Missouri Pacific bought the Gulf Coast Lines and operated it as a subsidiary. In March 1956, all of the GCL lines were merged into the Missouri Pacific system, losing their separate identity. The Missouri Pacific was merged into the Union Pacific Railroad in 1997.

=== Secondary lines ===
Before 1925, the following railroads were also part of the Gulf Coast Lines system who retained their separate legal identities:

- San Benito and Rio Grande Valley Railway
- Orange and Northwestern Railroad
- New Iberia and Northern Railroad
- Iberia, St. Mary and Eastern Railroad

Acquired by the New Orleans, Texas & Mexico on February 1, 1924:

- Houston & Brazos Valley Railway terminating at Freeport, Texas, 43.03 miles in total bought for $1,600,000 with assumption of all liabilities

Acquired by the New Orleans, Texas & Mexico on behalf of the Missouri Pacific in 1925 to keep the Missouri Kansas Texas from taking control of it, but operated as a separate division from the Gulf Coast Lines until all were merged into the Missouri Pacific on March 1, 1956:

- International-Great Northern Railroad

After 1925, the following railroads were purchased by the Gulf Coast Lines division of Missouri Pacific, though maintaining their separate legal identities.

Acquired by the New Orleans, Texas & Mexico on December 1, 1925:

- San Antonio, Uvalde and Gulf Railroad

Acquired by the New Orleans, Texas & Mexico on January 2, 1926:

- Sugar Land Railway
- Asherton and Gulf Railway
- Rio Grande City Railway

Acquired by New Orleans, Texas & Mexico in November 1926:

- Asphalt Belt Railway

Acquired by New Orleans, Texas & Mexico on January 1, 1927:

- San Antonio Southern, formerly the Artesian Belt Railroad

Acquired by the Beaumont, Sour Lake & Western on May 1, 1927:

- Houston North Shore Railway (electric interurban railway)

The Beaumont, Sour Lake & Western also owned a 25 percent share of the Houston Belt and Terminal Railway; the StLB&M owned a 50 percent share of the Brownsville and Matamoros Bridge Company.

== Passenger trains ==
After 1925, numerous Missouri Pacific passenger trains used the various segments of the Gulf Coast Lines route, which although legally separate entities for tax, tariff, and accounting purposes, were marketed to the public as a seamless continuation of MoPac passenger service.

One notable passenger train of the postwar era was the streamlined Valley Eagle, introduced on October 31, 1948, which covered the 372 miles between Houston, Corpus Christi, and Brownsville in 8 1/2 hours at an average speed of 44 miles per hour. Two trainsets of five cars each were built by ACF to make the daytime run in both directions. The train was discontinued on July 1, 1962.

Also in the postwar era, MoPac's Houstonian and Orleanean ran between New Orleans and Houston, covering the 367 miles in nine or ten hours.

== Bibliography ==
- Allhands, J.L. (1960). Railroads To The Rio, The Anson Jones Press, Salado, Texas. (No ISBN available)
- Morgan, David P. "Kingsville Division," Trains magazine, June 1949: 16–25.
