= Central Railroad of Pennsylvania =

Defunct railroad in Pennsylvania, United States

Overview
- Reporting mark: CRP
- Locale: Easton, Pennsylvania to Scranton, Pennsylvania, U.S.
- Dates of operation: August 5, 1946–1952
- Successor: CNJ, later Lehigh Valley

Technical
- Track gauge: 4 ft 8 1/2 in (1,435 mm) standard gauge

The Central Railroad of Pennsylvania (reporting mark CRP) was an attempt by the Central Railroad of New Jersey to avoid certain New Jersey taxes on their Pennsylvania lines. The attempt to reduce New Jersey Corporate taxes failed, and CRP operations were merged back into those of the CNJ six years later.

== History ==
Most of the Pennsylvania extension of the CNJ was built by the Lehigh and Susquehanna Railroad, leased to the CNJ in 1871 as their Lehigh and Susquehanna Division. By the 1940s the CNJ wished to avoid certain New Jersey taxes on its Pennsylvania lines. The Easton and Western Railroad, a short branch west of Easton, was renamed to the Central Railroad of Pennsylvania in 1944 and all Pennsylvania leases, primarily the L&S, were transferred to it in 1946.

The new company began operations August 5, 1946. Around the same time, the CNJ logo was changed from "Central Railroad Company of New Jersey" to "Jersey Central Lines". The arrangement was struck down by the courts and, in 1952, CRP operations were merged back into the CNJ. In 1972, the bankruptcy court ordered the CNJ to abandon Pennsylvania operations, which included the L&S. The CNJ's Pennsylvania lines were then operated by the Lehigh Valley Railroad.
