= Canadian Pacific Lines in Vermont =

Section of Canadian railway

Overview
- Headquarters: Calgary, Alberta, Canada
- Reporting mark: CP
- Locale: Richford, Vermont, Newport, Vermont, Wells River, Vermont
- Successor: Canadian Pacific Railway

Technical
- Track gauge: 4 ft 8 1/2 in (1,435 mm) standard gauge

The lines of the Canadian Pacific Railway (CP) operated in the State of Vermont were set up as a separate company to comply with Interstate Commerce Commission regulations and were considered a Class I U.S. railroad (in 1950, railroads with operating revenues over $1 million). The company operated 90 miles (140 km) of railway in Vermont.

== History ==
The CP's lines in Vermont were composed of the former Newport and Richford Railroad, leased to the Canadian Pacific in 1881, along with 64 miles (103 km) of former Boston and Maine trackage from Newport to Wells River. A portion of the Newport Subdivision route between Newport and Richford follows the Mississquoi River through Highwater and Glen Sutton in the Canadian province of Quebec. The Newport-Wells River, in conjunction with the Boston and Maine, served as a through route between Montreal, Quebec, and Boston, Massachusetts. The CP, together with the B&M, operated a day passenger train, the Alouette, and a night passenger train, the Red Wing, over this route. The Vermont lines did not connect with another CP subsidiary in the United States, the Canadian Pacific Lines in Maine.

In the late 1930s and early 1940s, the company reported financial losses for a few years, in contrast to other Canadian-owned lines in the U.S.

In 1950, the freight revenue from this line was $1.9 million, with an additional $162,000 in passenger receipts, qualifying it as a Class I railroad in the United States.

Service came to a temporary halt on Friday August 27, 1966, when sixteen trade unions in Canada stopped work in a nationwide strike action to demand higher pay rates. Parliament put forth a back-to-work bill the following Monday, and union leaders opted to honor the Parliament's request, officially ending the strike on September 2 (although some scattered railroad workers still refused to return to work, and many local union chapters enacted a work slowdown action).

Vermont filed an opposition to the B&M sale to Guilford Transportation in 1981 citing the potential for predatory competition to CP and the Lamoille Valley Railroad.
