= Savannah and Northwestern Railway =

Railroad in Georgia, USA

The Savannah and Northwestern Railway was a railroad in the U.S. state of Georgia. From 1906 to 1914, it was named the Brinson Railway after its owner, George M. Brinson, a businessman who had earlier built the Stillmore Air Line Railway. The line was originally planned to run from Savannah to Sylvania and had completed from Savannah to Newington by 1909. Around this time the Brinson took over the Savannah Valley Railroad and merged its lines into the Brinson. The company's property was sold to the Savannah and Atlanta Railway on July 16, 1917.

The Savannah and Atlanta Railway operated a mixed passenger and freight train from Waynesboro to Savannah (using its own terminal at the latter) until 1959.

== Heritage unit ==
In 2012, the Norfolk Southern Railway painted EMD SD70ACe #1065 in the Savannah and Atlanta paint scheme as part of its 30th anniversary celebrations.
