= Colorado and Wyoming Railway =

Railway in the United States

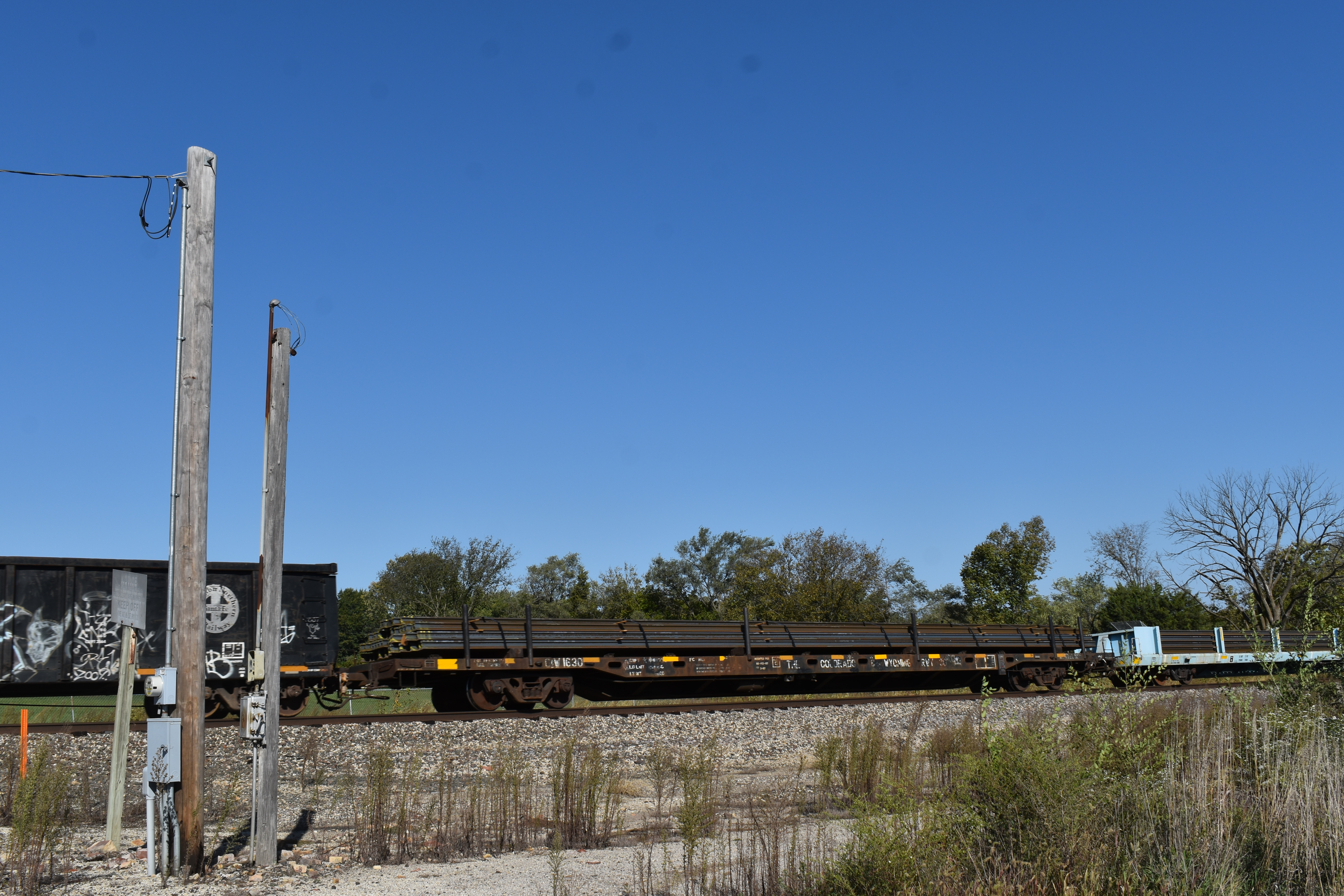
CW 1630 on October 5, 2020, in Carbondale, Kansas

Founded in 1899, the Colorado and Wyoming Railway (reporting mark CW) is a subsidiary of the Evraz North America. It hauls coal, ore and steel products on about five miles of track inside ERVAZ - Pueblo, CO Steel Mills facility (formerly Colorado Fuel and Iron's Minnequa plant) in Pueblo, Colorado, and connects to the Union Pacific Railroad and the BNSF Railway. The railway used to be a much larger railroad, serving the CF&I's mills, steel plants that were the only vertically integrated steel mills west of the Rockies until World War II.
