= Coal and Coke Railway =

Railway in West Virginia, US

Map

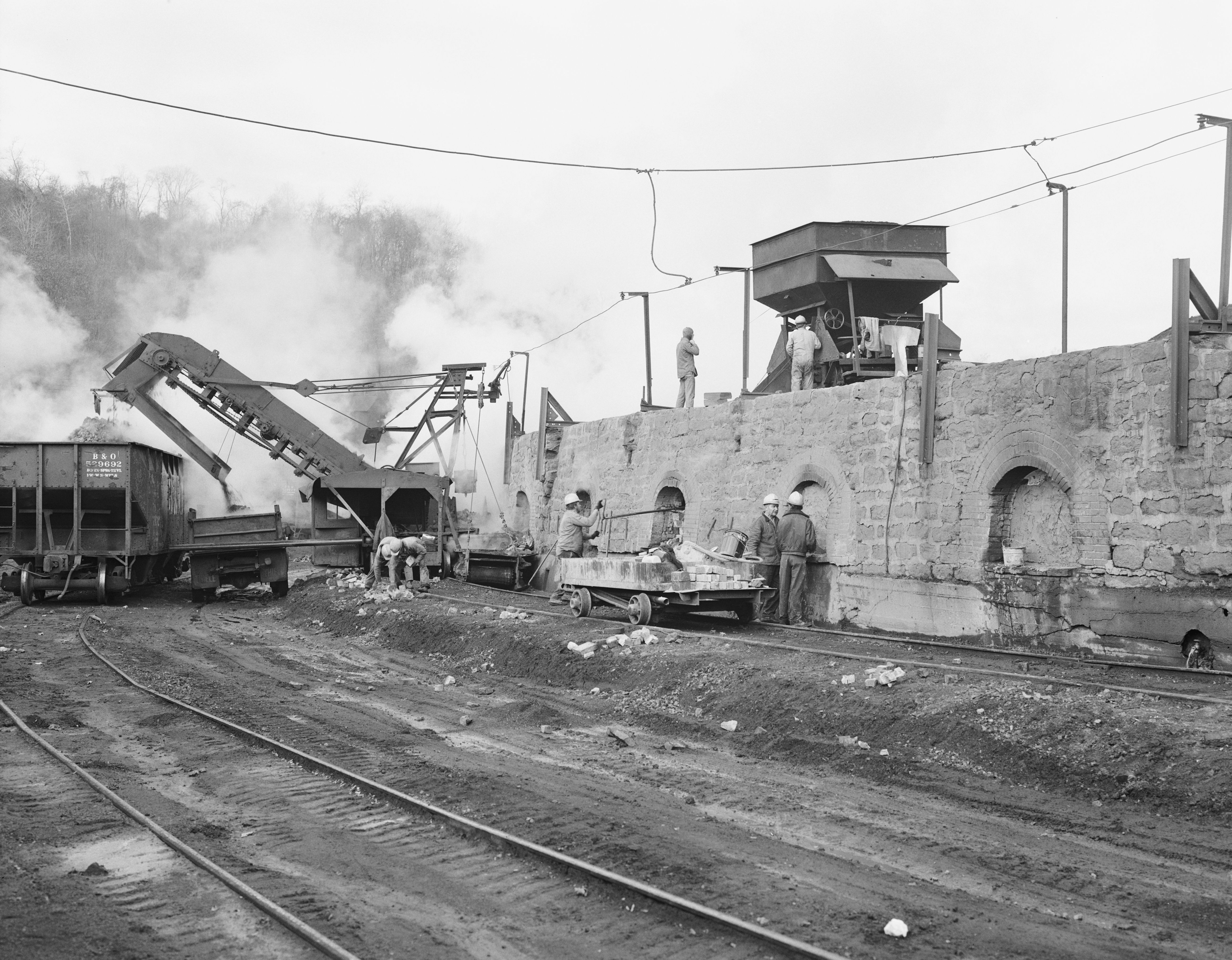
Coal and Coke Company

The Coal and Coke Railway was a railway operated by the Coal and Coke Railway Company in central West Virginia between 1905 and 1916. The line was made up of branches acquired from other companies and new construction. It ran from Elkins, West Virginia, at its northeastern terminus, to Charleston, West Virginia, at its southwestern terminus. Gassaway, West Virginia, was roughly the halfway point in the railway's approximate length of 196 miles.

A portion of the line was owned by the Elk River Railroad until operations ceased in 2022 and is in a state of disrepair. In 2021, work began converting the line between Clendenin and Gilmer Station into a state park called the Elk River Trail, a recreational trail used for hiking, biking, and horseback riding.
