= Alabama and Vicksburg Railway =

Defunct railroad in Mississippi, US

Alabama and Vicksburg Railroad (A&V)
Overview
- Locale: Mississippi, US
- Dates of operation: 1889–1959

Technical
- Track gauge: 4 ft 8 1/2 in (1,435 mm) standard gauge
- Length: 141.522 mi (227.758 km)

The Alabama and Vicksburg Railway (A&V), also known as the Alabama and Vicksburg, is a historic Mississippi railroad chartered in 1889 in Mississippi and in operation, from Meridian, westward to Vicksburg for a total of 141.522 miles (227.758 km) until being taken over by the Illinois Central Railroad in 1959. The A&V acquired all of the tracks, rolling stock, and fixed property, from the 1889 reorganization. Agreements were made on rental property in Vicksburg and Meridian as well as lands from some noncarriers.

== Early history ==
On December 19, 1831, the Clinton & Vicksburg Railroad (Clinton & Vicksburg Route companies) was incorporated with the authority to build 30 miles of track between Vicksburg and Clinton. Work began at Vicksburg in 1833 but on the 25th of December, the line was succeeded by the Commercial and Railroad Bank of Vicksburg. The company was formed to build a line from Vicksburg to Jackson as well as banking operations. By 1838 the company purchased a steam locomotive named Commercial from Matthias Baldwin and on November 1, 1838, a two-train daily schedule began from Vicksburg to the Big Black River.

== Depots ==
Many miles of tracks, as well as rolling stock, depots, bridges, and records, were destroyed during the Civil War. Some were rebuilt such as the Newton station (1904), and added to the Newton, Mississippi NHRP (# 90001076) in 1990, as a Mississippi Landmark.

The north/south tracks through Newton (28 miles terminating at Bay Springs, Mississippi) were previously the Mobile, Jackson and Kansas City Railroad Company owned by KCS under Mississippi Southern Railroad (MSR) and leased to Watco Rail Services, located at Pittsburg, Kansas, owns 5,500 miles of short line track in North America and Australia.

== Track gauge ==
In the beginning track width in Mississippi had no common size. American engineer, Walton Evans had a hypothesis so he measured carts and chariots in Pompeii and when converted measured 4 feet, 9 inches center-to-center. Later Roman archeology confirmed this to be a common measurement that was slightly more than railroad gauge measured inside rail to the inside rail. George Stephenson used 4 feet, 8 inches for the Stockton & Darlington Railway and the Liverpool & Manchester Railway, which was the world’s first railway between major cities.

There have been many opponents of what was to become known as the standard gauge. In the south broad-gauge was used more than standard and 5 feet, 0 inches was the more common but there were still many variations.

== See also ==
List of Mississippi railroads
