= St. Louis, Brownsville and Mexico Railway =

Former American railway in Texas

St. Louis, Brownsville & Mexico
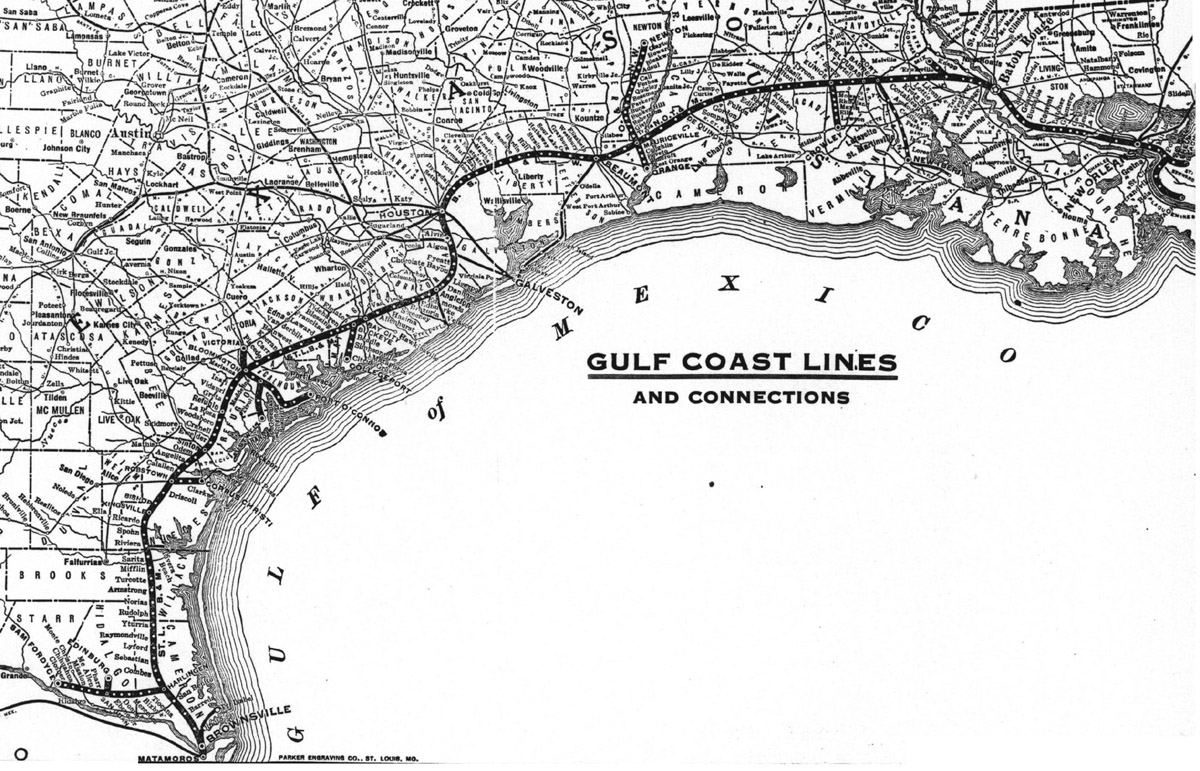
- Gulf Coast Lines system map, circa 1920

Overview
- Headquarters: Kingsville, Texas
- Reporting mark: StLB&M, SLBM, SBM
- Locale: Texas
- Dates of operation: 6 June 1903–1 March 1956
- Successor: Missouri Pacific

Technical
- Track gauge: 4 ft 8 1/2 in (1,435 mm) standard gauge

Chartered on June 6, 1903, the St. Louis, Brownsville & Mexico Railway (also known as the Brownie) was a 200-mile (321 km) U.S. railroad that operated from Brownsville, Texas, to Gulf Coast Junction in Houston, Texas. It served numerous towns and cities along its routes and operated a rail bridge between Brownsville and Matamoros, Tamaulipas, in junction with the Mexican government. The Brownie connected the citizens of Brownsville to nearby Corpus Christi for the first time on land rather than using water transportation.

== Early history ==
After Uriah Lott's success with his first railroad project, the Corpus Christi, San Diego and Rio Grande Narrow Gauge Railroad in March 1875, he envisioned a plan of creating land transportation along the southern interior of Texas. Uriah collaborated with business partner Benjamin Franklin Yoakum to create a large rail system that reached from Chicago, Illinois, in the north to Mexico City in the south. To put this plan into effect, Yoakum used control from one of his two railroads he was president from - the St. Louis - San Francisco - to create several railroads within Texas and Louisiana as a system. Known as the Gulf Coast Lines, the system was created in three phases under three different railroads: The St. Louis, Brownsville and Mexico (Phase 1 - June 1903), the Beaumont, Sour Lake & Western (Phase 2 - October 1903) and the New Orleans, Texas & Mexico Railway (Phase 3 - September 1909).

In April 1904, the St. Louis, Brownsville & Mexico took delivery of their first three new locomotives: Burnham, Williams & Co. 4-4-0s #925, 926 & 927. Shortly after the arrival of the locomotives, the first segment of track was completed on July 4, 1904, which reached Brownsville, Texas, from its starting point in Robstown, Texas. On December 31, 1907, the second (and last) major segment of track on the Brownie was completed to Houston from its starting point in Robstown and reaching Sinton as well.

To further expand the southern portions of the Robstown-Brownsville route, the StLB&M acquired the financially troubled San Antonio, Chapin & Rio Grande Railway as well as the San Benito & Rio Grande Valley Railway; one of the earliest expansions of the Rio Grande Valley Spider Web Rail Network which linked various small to large cities together.

== Gulf Coast Lines era ==
In 1913, Yoakum and Lott's dream came to an end when the St. Louis - San Francisco entered receivership. Upon hearings of the Interstate Commerce Commission, the court ordered the receivers to sell off all of Yoakum's rail projects to recover from lost profits or face entire abandonment. In 1916, the New Orleans, Texas & Mexico Railway assumed control of the Gulf Coast Lines and established itself as an independent railway company until 1924. The New Orleans, Texas and Mexico Railway Co. was incorporated in 1916 to hold the securities of four railroads: (1) New Orleans, Texas & Mexico; (2) Beaumont, Sour Lake & Western; (3) Orange & Northwestern; and (4) St. Louis, Brownsville & Mexico Railroads. Bonds which had previously been issued by the San Francisco & St. Louis Company went into default in 1913. Foreclosure of the liens took place in 1915. The creditors of the bonds reorganized into the new company in 1916, which became the owner. At that time new officers were elected. The new chairman was Frank Andrews of Houston, Texas, and vice president became G.H. Walker, a banker in St. Louis. Additional officers and directors are set out in the 1916 edition of the Manual of Statistics Handbook. The four railroads owned by the new company were known as the Gulf Coast Lines.

G.H. Walker would later become the father-in-law of Prescott Bush.

Under the Gulf Coast Lines ownership of the StLB&M, the railway saw no new purchases of rolling stock or locomotives. The last new rail line was completed in 1920 from Brownsville to Southmost, Texas.

== Missouri Pacific era ==
Under the presidency of Lewis W. Baldwin of the Missouri Pacific Railroad, the Gulf Coast Lines were acquired in December 1924 and renamed as the Gulf Coast Lines Division. This acquisition now gave the Missouri Pacific access to the southern portions of Texas in competition with the Southern Pacific Railroad and its Atlantic Lines Division.

To further expand the Spider Web Rail Network in the Rio Grande Valley, the Missouri Pacific acquired the Rio Grande City Railway under the New Orleans, Texas & Mexico Railroad in 1926. The final acquisition for the Spider Web Rail Network came in 1941 when the former narrow gauged Port Isabel & Rio Grande Valley railway was acquired by the St. Louis, Brownsville & Mexico.

Unfortunately, the Missouri Pacific declared bankruptcy in 1933 and entered into trusteeship. During the MP/Trusteeship era, the STLB&M continued to modernize and expand. The last new steam locomotive delivered to the StLB&M was Lima 0-8-0 #9766 in 1929. The StLB&M took delivery of its first new diesel-electric locomotive: General Electric 44 Ton #813 in January 1942. The last new diesel-electric locomotive to arrive on the StLB&M was Baldwin AS-16 #4331 in July 1954.

After 13 years of trusteeship - the longest of its kind in North American history - the StLB&M (as well as the other Gulf Coast Lines subsidiaries) were reorganized and merged away into the Missouri Pacific (under the presidency of Paul J. Neff) on March 1, 1956, when the United States District Court of St. Louis terminated the trusteeship. Shortly after the merger did the name of 'StLB&M' and 'Gulf Coast Lines' quickly disappear and various feeder/branch lines were aggressively being abandoned.

== Motive power equipment ==
=== Steam locomotives ===
The StLB&M purchased various lightweight locomotives to serve main lines, branch lines and various feeder lines along the system.

Under the Yoakum era, the steam locomotives were lettered "ST. LOUIS BROWNSVILLE & MEXICO" along the upper section of the tender and the reporting marks were applied on the cab.

Under the Gulf Coast Lines era, the steam locomotives were lettered "GULF COAST LINES" along the upper section of the tender, but the railroad's reporting marks below the locomotive's roadnumber on the cab.

Under the Missouri Pacific era, the steam locomotives were lettered "MISSOURI PACIFIC LINES" along the upper section of the tender, but the railroad's reporting marks were applied below the locomotive's roadnumber on the cab and on the steam dome.

St. Louis, Brownsville & Mexico Steam Roster
Builder	Date	Locomotive Model	Quantity	Road numbers	Notes
Burnham, Williams & Co.	April 1904 – December 1905	4-4-0	16	925 – 927, 6 – 11, 910 – 912 & 952 – 955	925 – 927 are the first steam locomotives delivered
Baldwin Locomotive Works	June 1905 – December 1907	4-6-0	12	251 – 262	
Baldwin Locomotive Works	1905	0-6-0	3	9580 – 9582	
Baldwin Locomotive Works	August 1914	2-8-0	20	81 – 100	#100 is the last new steam locomotive delivered before Gulf Coast Lines era
Alco-Brooks Locomotive Works	1926	2-8-2	20	1111–1120	#1111 is the first new steam locomotive delivered in the Missouri Pacific era. 1111-1118 were oil burners while 1119-1120 were lignite fired
Alco-Brooks Locomotive Works	1927	4-6-2	6	1156–1161	
Alco-Richmond Locomotive Works	1927	0-8-0	5	9601 – 9605	
Lima Locomotive Works	1927	0-8-0	3	9761 – 9762, 9766	#9766 is the last new steam locomotive

=== Diesel-Electric Locomotives ===
Since the Brownie had various branch lines and feeder lines (especially within the Rio Grande Valley) among its system, the Missouri Pacific purchased various lightweight diesel locomotives and switchers to operate where heavy diesel or steam locomotives were not permitted. Only ALCO PA-2s and Electro Motive Division E7 and E8 models were used in passenger service along the Brownsville - Houston route.

St. Louis, Brownsville & Mexico Diesel Roster
Builder	Date	Locomotive Model	Quantity	Road numbers	Notes
General Electric	January – February 1942	44 Tonner	2	813 – 814	#813 is the first new diesel-electric locomotive
Baldwin Locomotive Works	March 1944 – May 1946	VO-1000	5	9153 – 9155, 9160 – 9161	
Electro-Motive Division	March 1947	E7A	2	7008 – 7009	The only six axle diesel-electric locomotives on the roster
Electro-Motive Division	November 1947 – June 1948	F3A	24	529 – 552	
Baldwin Locomotive Works	February – March 1949, March 1950	DRS-4-4-1500	4	4112 – 4115	
Baldwin Locomotive Works	March – April 1949	DS-4-4-1000	6	9162 – 9167	
Electro-Motive Division	October 1949, April 1950	F7A	10	607 – 614, 615 – 616	
Electro-Motive Division	July 1950 – April 1954	GP7	28	4116 – 4120, 4159 – 4165, 4203 – 4207, 4249 – 4253, 4284 – 4286, 4298, 4323 – 4324	
Electro-Motive Division	April 1951	SW9	5	9187 – 9191	
Baldwin-Lima-Hamilton	April 1952	S12	3	9227 – 9229	
Baldwin-Lima-Hamilton	June – July 1954	AS-16	6	4326 - 4331	#4331 is the last new locomotive delivered to the StLB&M
