= Missouri–Illinois Railroad =

American railroad (1921–1978)

The Missouri–Illinois Railroad was a railroad that operated in Missouri and Illinois. The railroad operated around 200 miles (320 km) of track on both sides of the Mississippi River, connected by a train ferry. It began operations in 1921, and was owned by the Missouri Pacific Railroad and operated as a subsidiary railroad until it was merged into the Missouri Pacific in 1978.

In 1970 it reported 359 million net ton-miles of revenue freight and zero passengers on 333 miles of road operated (138 miles owned).
