= New Orleans, Texas and Mexico Railway =

Railway in southern United States

Overview
- Locale: southern United States
- Successor: Missouri Pacific Railroad

Technical
- Track gauge: 4 ft 8 1/2 in (1,435 mm)

The New Orleans, Texas and Mexico Railway was a constituent element of the Missouri Pacific Railroad.
