= List of U.S. Class I railroads =

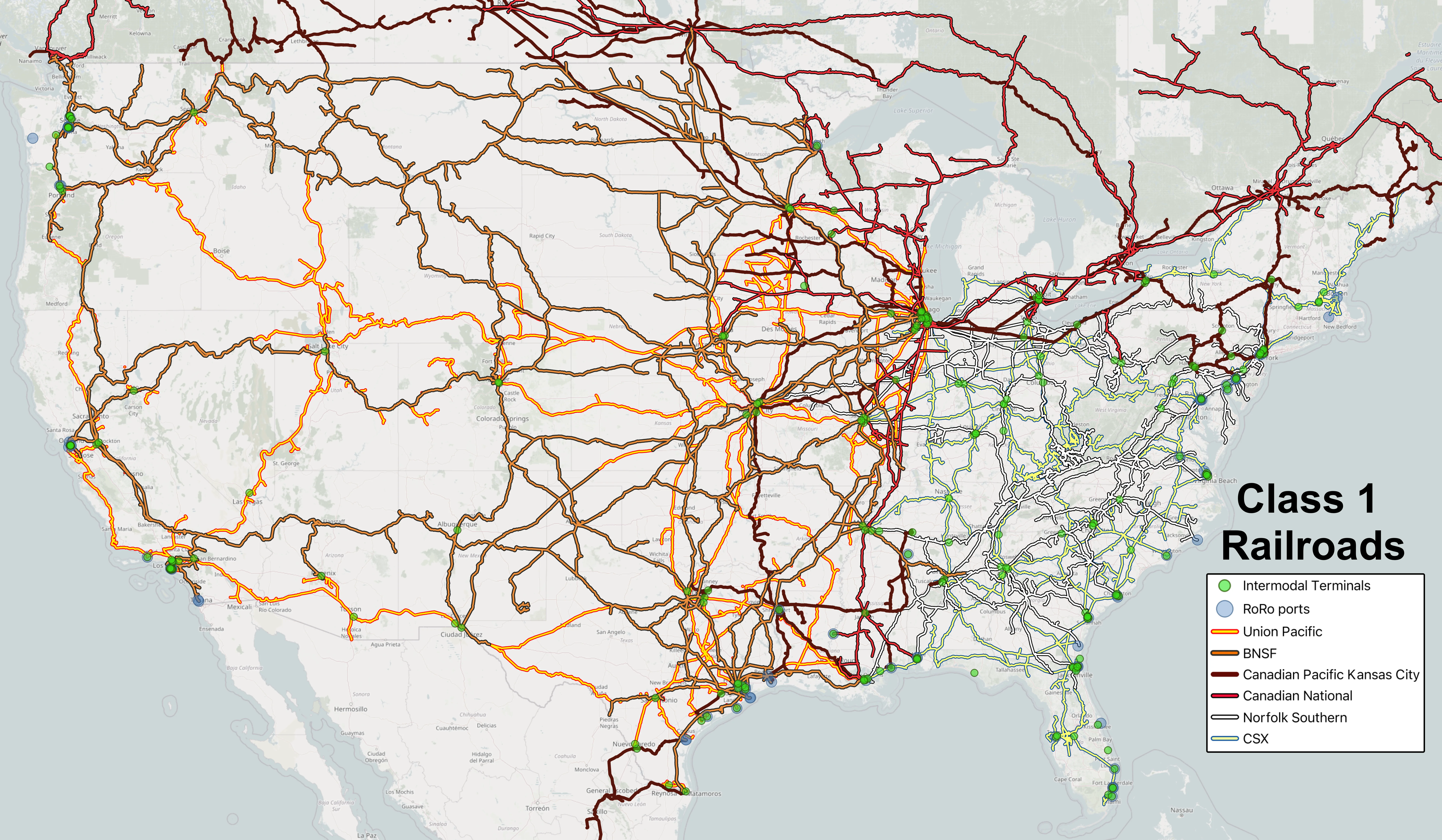
Class 1 railroads with intermodal terminals and maritime RoRo ports

In the United States, railroads are designated as Class I, Class II, or Class III, according to size criteria first established by the Interstate Commerce Commission (ICC) in 1911, and now governed by the Surface Transportation Board (STB). The STB's current definition of a Class I railroad was set in 1992, that being any carrier earning annual revenue greater than $250 million. The threshold was reported to be $1.074 billion in 2024.

This is a list of current and former Class I railroads in North America under the older criteria and the newer, as well as today's much different post-railroad consolidation classifications.

== Current Class I railroads ==
As of 2026, there are just four American owned Class I freight railroad companies and one passenger railroad company (Amtrak). The list also includes two Canadian-owned Class I freight railroads, both of which have trackage in the US, and one, CPKC, has trackage in Mexico.

- Amtrak
- BNSF Railway
- Canadian National Railway
- Canadian Pacific Kansas City (Holding company for subsidiaries)
- CSX Transportation
- Ferromex
- Norfolk Southern Railway
- Union Pacific Railroad

== Former Class I railroads ==
This list includes diverse financial entities. Some of these refer to operating companies which were turned into investments, some hanging onto a corporate skeleton owning properties as holding companies, or have assigned their properties in mergers, bankruptcy or other legal acts (dissolution of the corporation), and others defunct and dismantled.

- Akron, Canton and Youngstown Railroad
- Alabama Great Southern Railroad
- Alabama, Tennessee and Northern Railroad
- Alabama and Vicksburg Railway
- Alton Railroad
- Ann Arbor Railroad
- Arizona Eastern Railroad
- Arizona and New Mexico Railway
- Atchison, Topeka and Santa Fe Railway
- Atlanta, Birmingham and Atlantic Railway
- Atlanta, Birmingham and Coast Railroad
- Atlanta and St. Andrews Bay Railway
- Atlanta and West Point Railroad
- Atlantic City Railroad
- Atlantic Coast Line Railroad
- Atlantic and Danville Railway
- Atlantic and St. Lawrence Railroad
- Auto-Train Corporation
- Baltimore, Chesapeake and Atlantic Railway
- Baltimore and Ohio Railroad
- Bangor and Aroostook Railroad
- Beaumont, Sour Lake and Western Railway
- Bessemer and Lake Erie Railroad
- Bingham and Garfield Railway
- Boston and Maine Railroad
- Buffalo, Rochester and Pittsburgh Railway
- Buffalo and Susquehanna Railroad
- Burlington Northern Inc.
- Burlington Northern Railroad
- Burlington-Rock Island Railroad
- Butte, Anaconda and Pacific Railway
- Cambria and Indiana Railroad
- Canadian National Lines in New England
- Canadian Northern Railway
- Canadian Pacific Railway
- Canadian Pacific Lines in Maine
- Canadian Pacific Lines in Vermont
- Carolina, Clinchfield and Ohio Railway
- Carolina and Northwestern Railway
- Central of Georgia Railway
- Central New England Railway
- Central Railroad of New Jersey
- Central Railroad of Pennsylvania
- Central Vermont Railway
- Charleston and Western Carolina Railway
- Chesapeake and Ohio Railway
- Chesapeake and Ohio Railway of Indiana
- Chicago and Alton Railroad
- Chicago, Burlington and Quincy Railroad
- Chicago, Detroit and Canada Grand Trunk Junction Railroad
- Chicago and Eastern Illinois Railroad
- Chicago and Erie Railroad
- Chicago Great Western Railroad
- Chicago and Illinois Midland Railway
- Chicago, Indiana and Southern Railroad
- Chicago, Indianapolis and Louisville Railway
- Chicago, Milwaukee and Puget Sound Railway
- Chicago, Milwaukee, St. Paul and Pacific Railroad (The Milwaukee Road)
- Chicago and North Western Transportation Company
- Chicago, Peoria and St. Louis Railroad
- Chicago, Rock Island and Gulf Railway
- Chicago, Rock Island and Pacific Railroad
- Chicago, St. Paul, Minneapolis and Omaha Railway
- Chicago Southern Railway
- Chicago, Terre Haute and Southeastern Railway
- Cincinnati, Hamilton and Dayton Railway
- Cincinnati, Indianapolis and Western Railroad
- Cincinnati, Lebanon and Northern Railway
- Cincinnati, New Orleans and Texas Pacific Railway
- Cincinnati Northern Railroad
- Cleveland, Akron and Cincinnati Railway
- Cleveland, Akron and Columbus Railway
- Cleveland, Cincinnati, Chicago and St. Louis Railway
- Clinchfield Railroad
- Coal and Coke Railway
- Colorado Midland Railroad
- Colorado Midland Railway
- Colorado and Southern Railway
- Colorado and Wyoming Railway
- Columbus and Greenville Railway (1923–1972)
- Columbus and Greenville Railway (1975)
- Consolidated Rail Corporation/Conrail
- Copper River and Northwestern Railway
- Cripple Creek and Colorado Springs Railroad
- Cumberland Valley Railroad
- Cumberland Valley and Martinsburg Railroad
- Delaware and Hudson Company
- Delaware and Hudson Railroad
- Delaware and Hudson Railway
- Delaware, Lackawanna and Western Railroad
- Denver, Northwestern and Pacific Railway
- Denver and Rio Grande Railroad
- Denver and Rio Grande Western Railroad
- Denver and Salt Lake Railroad
- Denver and Salt Lake Railway
- Detroit, Grand Haven and Milwaukee Railway
- Detroit and Mackinac Railway
- Detroit, Toledo and Ironton Railroad
- Detroit and Toledo Shore Line Railroad
- Duluth and Iron Range Railroad
- Duluth, Missabe and Iron Range Railway
- Duluth, Missabe and Northern Railway
- Duluth, South Shore and Atlantic Railway
- Duluth, Winnipeg and Pacific Railway
- El Paso and Southwestern Company
- Elgin, Joliet and Eastern Railway
- Erie Railroad
- Erie-Lackawanna Railroad
- Erie Lackawanna Railway
- Evansville, Indianapolis and Terre Haute Railway
- Evansville and Terre Haute Railroad
- Florence and Cripple Creek Railroad
- Florida East Coast Railway (now class 2)
- Fonda, Johnstown and Gloversville Railroad
- Fort Smith and Western Railroad
- Fort Smith and Western Railway
- Fort Worth and Denver Railway
- Fort Worth and Denver City Railway
- Fort Worth and Rio Grande Railway
- Galveston, Harrisburg and San Antonio Railway
- Georgia Railroad
- Georgia and Florida Railroad
- Georgia and Florida Railway
- Georgia Southern and Florida Railway
- Grand Canyon Railway
- Grand Rapids and Indiana Railway
- Grand Trunk Corporation
- Grand Trunk Western Railroad
- Grand Trunk Western Railway
- Great Northern Railway
- Green Bay and Western Railroad
- Gulf, Colorado and Santa Fe Railway
- Gulf, Mobile and Northern Railroad
- Gulf, Mobile and Ohio Railroad
- Gulf and Ship Island Railroad
- Hocking Valley Railway
- Houston East and West Texas Railway
- Houston and Texas Central Railroad
- Illinois Central Railroad
- Illinois Central Gulf Railroad
- Illinois Terminal Company
- Illinois Terminal Railroad
- Indianapolis Southern Railroad
- International-Great Northern Railroad
- International and Great Northern Railroad
- International and Great Northern Railway
- International Railway of Maine
- Iowa Central Railway
- Kanawha and Michigan Railway
- Kansas City, Mexico and Orient Railroad
- Kansas City, Mexico and Orient Railway
- Kansas City, Mexico and Orient Railway of Texas
- Kansas City Southern Railway
- Kansas, Oklahoma and Gulf Railway
- Lake Erie and Western Railroad
- Lake Shore and Michigan Southern Railway
- Lake Superior and Ishpeming Railroad
- Lake Superior and Ishpeming Railway
- Lehigh and Hudson River Railway
- Lehigh and New England Railroad
- Lehigh Valley Railroad
- Litchfield and Madison Railway
- Long Island Rail Road
- Los Angeles and Salt Lake Railroad
- Louisiana and Arkansas Railway
- Louisiana, Arkansas and Texas Railway
- Louisiana Railway and Navigation Company
- Louisiana Railway and Navigation Company of Texas
- Louisiana Western Railroad
- Louisville, Henderson and St. Louis Railway
- Louisville and Nashville Railroad
- Maine Central Railroad
- Maryland, Delaware and Virginia Railway
- Michigan Central Railroad
- Michigan Interstate Railway
- Midland Valley Railroad
- Mineral Range Railroad
- Minneapolis, Northfield and Southern Railway
- Minneapolis and St. Louis Railroad
- Minneapolis and St. Louis Railway
- Minneapolis, St. Paul and Sault Ste. Marie Railroad (Soo Line)
- Minneapolis, St. Paul and Sault Ste. Marie Railway
- Minnesota and International Railway
- Mississippi Central Railroad
- Missouri and Arkansas Railway
- Missouri-Illinois Railroad
- Missouri-Kansas-Texas Railroad (Katy)
- Missouri, Kansas and Texas Railway
- Missouri-Kansas-Texas Railroad of Texas
- Missouri, Kansas and Texas Railway of Texas
- Missouri and North Arkansas Railroad
- Missouri and North Arkansas Railway
- Missouri, Oklahoma and Gulf Railway
- Missouri Pacific Railroad
- Missouri Pacific Railway
- Mobile and Ohio Railroad
- Monon Railroad
- Monongahela Railroad
- Monongahela Railway
- Montour Railroad
- Morgan's Louisiana and Texas Railroad and Steamship Company
- Nashville, Chattanooga and St. Louis Railway
- National Railroad Passenger Corporation (Amtrak)
- Nevada Northern Railway
- New Jersey and New York Railroad
- New Orleans Great Northern Railroad
- New Orleans, Mobile and Chicago Railroad
- New Orleans and Northeastern Railroad
- New Orleans, Texas and Mexico Railroad
- New Orleans, Texas and Mexico Railway
- New York Central Railroad
- New York Central and Hudson River Railroad
- New York, Chicago and St. Louis Railroad (Nickel Plate Road)
- New York Connecting Railroad
- New York, New Haven and Hartford Railroad
- New York, Ontario and Western Railway
- New York, Philadelphia and Norfolk Railroad
- New York, Susquehanna and Western Railroad
- Norfolk Southern Railroad
- Norfolk Southern Railway (1942-1982)
- Norfolk and Western Railway
- Northern Alabama Railway
- Northern Central Railway
- Northern Pacific Railway
- Northwestern Pacific Railroad
- Oahu Railway and Land Company
- Oklahoma City-Ada-Atoka Railway
- Oregon Electric Railway
- Oregon Railroad and Navigation Company
- Oregon Short Line Railroad
- Oregon-Washington Railroad and Navigation Company
- Pacific Electric Railway
- Panhandle and Santa Fe Railway
- Pecos and Northern Texas Railway
- Penn Central Transportation Company
- Pennsylvania Railroad
- Pennsylvania Company
- Pennsylvania-Reading Seashore Lines
- Peoria and Eastern Railway
- Pere Marquette Railway
- Perkiomen Railroad
- Philadelphia, Baltimore and Washington Railroad
- Philadelphia and Reading Railway
- Piedmont and Northern Railway
- Pittsburgh, Cincinnati, Chicago and St. Louis Railroad
- Pittsburgh and Lake Erie Railroad
- Pittsburg and Shawmut Railroad
- Pittsburg, Shawmut and Northern Railroad
- Pittsburgh and West Virginia Railway
- Port Reading Railroad
- Quanah, Acme and Pacific Railway
- Quincy, Omaha and Kansas City Railroad
- Reading Company
- Richmond, Fredericksburg and Potomac Railroad
- Rutland Railroad
- Rutland Railway
- Sacramento Northern Railway
- St. Joseph and Grand Island Railway
- St. Louis, Brownsville and Mexico Railway
- St. Louis, Iron Mountain and Southern Railway
- St. Louis-San Francisco Railway (Frisco)
- St. Louis and San Francisco Railroad
- St. Louis, San Francisco and Texas Railway
- St. Louis Southwestern Railway (Cotton Belt)
- St. Louis Southwestern Railway of Texas
- San Antonio and Aransas Pass Railway
- San Antonio, Uvalde and Gulf Railroad
- San Diego and Arizona Railway
- San Diego and Arizona Eastern Railway
- San Pedro, Los Angeles and Salt Lake Railroad
- Santa Fe, Prescott and Phoenix Railway
- Savannah and Atlanta Railway
- Seaboard Air Line Railroad
- Seaboard Air Line Railway
- Seaboard Coast Line Railroad
- Seaboard System Railroad
- Soo Line Railroad
- Southern Indiana Railway
- Southern Kansas Railway of Texas
- Southern Pacific Company
- Southern Pacific Transportation Company
- Southern Railway
- Southern Railway in Mississippi
- Spokane and Inland Empire Railroad
- Spokane International Railroad
- Spokane International Railway
- Spokane, Portland and Seattle Railway
- Staten Island Rapid Transit Railway
- Sunset Railroad
- Syracuse, Binghamton and New York Railroad
- Tennessee Central Railroad
- Tennessee Central Railway
- Texarkana and Fort Smith Railway
- Texas Mexican Railway
- Texas and New Orleans Railroad
- Texas and Northern Railway
- Texas and Pacific Railway
- Toledo and Ohio Central Railway
- Toledo, Peoria and Western Railroad
- Toledo, Peoria and Western Railway
- Toledo, St. Louis and Western Railroad
- Trinity and Brazos Valley Railway
- Ulster and Delaware Railroad
- Utah Railway
- Vandalia Railroad
- Via Rail Canada *
- Vicksburg, Shreveport and Pacific Railway
- Virginia and Southwestern Railway
- Virginian Railway
- Wabash Railroad
- Wabash Railway
- Wabash Pittsburgh Terminal Railway
- Washington Southern Railway
- West Jersey and Seashore Railroad
- Western Railway of Alabama
- Western Maryland Railway
- Western Pacific Railroad
- Western Pacific Railway
- Wheeling and Lake Erie Railroad
- Wheeling and Lake Erie Railway
- Wichita Falls and Northwestern Railway
- Wichita Falls and Southern Railroad
- Wichita Valley Railway
- Wisconsin Central Railroad
- Wisconsin Central Railway
- Yazoo and Mississippi Valley Railroad
