= Foraker, Oklahoma =

- Town
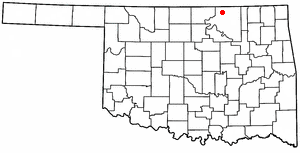
- Location of Foraker, Oklahoma
- Coordinates: 36°52′25″N 96°34′09″W
- Country: United States
- State: Oklahoma
- County: Osage

Area
  - Total: 0.26 sq mi (0.67 km^{2})
  - Land: 0.26 sq mi (0.67 km^{2})
  - Water: 0 sq mi (0.00 km^{2})
- Elevation: 1,270 ft (390 m)

Population (2020)
  - Total: 18
  - Density: 69.2/sq mi (26.73/km^{2})
- Time zone: UTC-6 (Central (CST))
  - Summer (DST): UTC-5 (CDT)
- ZIP code: 74652
- Area codes: 539/918
- FIPS code: 40-26750
- GNIS feature ID: 2412635

Foraker is a town in Osage County, Oklahoma, United States. It was named for Ohio Senator Joseph B. Foraker. The Tallgrass Prairie Preserve is southeast of town. The official population peaked at 415 in 1910 and has declined steadily since 1930. As of the 2020 census, Foraker had a population of 18.

Foraker was listed as a ghost town in the 1977 book Ghost Towns of Oklahoma. The author, John Wesley Morris, quoted one long-time resident as saying: "Stores gone, post office gone, train gone, school gone, oil gone, boys and girls gone – only thing not gone is graveyard and it git bigger."

== History ==
Located in an area of rolling plains and tallgrass prairie, a post office was established at Foraker on February 13, 1903. The town began as a 160-acre tract platted by the U.S. Department of the Interior along the Midland Valley Railroad in 1905. By 1909, the town had a population of 500 as the area underwent a ranching and farming boom. Foraker had the amenities associated with older communities: sidewalks, a public park, and plans for an electric and water system and a substantial school building.

The agriculture boom subsided, but the town was briefly revitalized by discovery of the Burbank Oil Field in 1920, which made Foraker an oil industry equipment supply center. In 1922 the Osage Railway, one of the Muskogee Roads, was opened from Foraker to Shidler, ten miles away, making Foraker an oil shipping point. The population rose to about 2,000 in the early 1920s. The Osage County oil boom soon declined and with it Foraker's fortunes. The population dropped. The Osage Valley railroad was abandoned in 1953 and the Midland Valley Railroad was abandoned in 1968. The town business district fell vacant. Foraker is now in a region dominated by large cattle ranches. A lonely and picturesque old cemetery in the prairie approximately one mile east of what remains of the town is the chief landmark. The nearest post office is at Shidler.

== Geography ==
Foraker is 13 miles (21 km) north and 12 miles (19 km) west of Pawhuska and 6 miles (9.7 km) north and 3 miles (4.8 km) east of Shidler.

== Demographics ==
Historical population
Census	Pop.	Note	%±
1910	415		—
1920	394		−5.1%
1930	310		−21.3%
1940	222		−28.4%
1950	105		−52.7%
1960	74		−29.5%
1970	52		−29.7%
1980	34		−34.6%
1990	25		−26.5%
2000	23		−8.0%
2010	19		−17.4%
2020	18		−5.3%
U.S. Decennial Census

=== 2020 census ===
As of the 2020 census, Foraker had a population of 18. The median age was 47.5 years. 0.0% of residents were under the age of 18 and 5.6% of residents were 65 years of age or older. For every 100 females there were 100.0 males, and for every 100 females age 18 and over there were 100.0 males age 18 and over.

0.0% of residents lived in urban areas, while 100.0% lived in rural areas.

There were 8 households in Foraker, of which 50.0% had children under the age of 18 living in them. Of all households, 62.5% were married-couple households, 0.0% were households with a male householder and no spouse or partner present, and 25.0% were households with a female householder and no spouse or partner present. About 0.0% of all households were made up of individuals and 0.0% had someone living alone who was 65 years of age or older.

There were 8 housing units, of which 0.0% were vacant. The homeowner vacancy rate was 0.0% and the rental vacancy rate was 0.0%.

Racial composition as of the 2020 census
Race	Number	Percent
White	10	55.6%
Black or African American	0	0.0%
American Indian and Alaska Native	2	11.1%
Asian	0	0.0%
Native Hawaiian and Other Pacific Islander	0	0.0%
Some other race	0	0.0%
Two or more races	6	33.3%
Hispanic or Latino (of any race)	1	5.6%

=== 2000 census ===
As of the census of 2000, there were 23 people, 10 households, and 6 families residing in the town. The population density was 104.6 inhabitants per square mile (40.4/km^{2}). There were 13 housing units at an average density of 59.1 per square mile (22.8/km^{2}). The racial makeup of the town was 73.91% White, 4.35% Native American, and 21.74% from two or more races. Hispanic or Latino of any race were 4.35% of the population.

There were 10 households, out of which 30.0% had children under the age of 18 living with them, 60.0% were married couples living together, and 40.0% were non-families. 40.0% of all households were made up of individuals, and 20.0% had someone living alone who was 65 years of age or older. The average household size was 2.30 and the average family size was 3.17.

In the town, the population was spread out, with 26.1% under the age of 18, 4.3% from 18 to 24, 30.4% from 25 to 44, 13.0% from 45 to 64, and 26.1% who were 65 years of age or older. The median age was 40 years. For every 100 females, there were 91.7 males. For every 100 females age 18 and over, there were 88.9 males.

The median income for a household in the town was $36,250, and the median income for a family was $63,333. Males had a median income of $38,750 versus $18,750 for females. The per capita income for the town was $20,079. None of the population and none of the families were below the poverty line.

== Education ==
It is in Shidler Public Schools.

== Notable people ==
As a child the singer Patti Page (born Clara Ann Fowler) lived with her family for a time on Maple St. in Foraker.

Rodeo champion and Oscar-winning actor Ben Johnson (The Last Picture Show) was born and raised on his family's ranch near Foraker.
