= Webb City, Oklahoma =

- Town
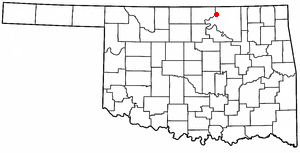
- Location of Webb City, Oklahoma
- Coordinates: 36°48′27″N 96°42′43″W
- Country: United States
- State: Oklahoma
- County: Osage

Area
  - Total: 0.25 sq mi (0.65 km^{2})
  - Land: 0.25 sq mi (0.65 km^{2})
  - Water: 0 sq mi (0.00 km^{2})
- Elevation: 1,099 ft (335 m)

Population (2020)
  - Total: 58
  - Density: 230.4/sq mi (88.97/km^{2})
- Time zone: UTC-6 (Central (CST))
  - Summer (DST): UTC-5 (CDT)
- FIPS code: 40-79600
- GNIS feature ID: 2413460

Webb City is an unincorporated town in northwestern Osage County, Oklahoma, United States. As of the 2020 census, Webb City had a population of 58. It was named for its founder, Horace Webb, on whose land the town was founded. The Webb City post office opened December 16, 1922.

== History ==
Horace W. Webb, a native of Missouri, settled just south of Grainola, Oklahoma in 1910. He continued to purchase land and opened the area's first school. The town of Webb City was incorporated on his land in September 1921. The post office opened in Webb City on December 16, 1922.

Webb City was located at the northern end of the Burbank Oil Field, discovered in 1920. All mineral rights in Osage County were owned by the Osage tribe of American Indians. The Osage Railway, one of the Muskogee Roads, built a line through the town in 1924 connecting Shidler and Lyman, Oklahoma. Although the oil find brought a degree of prosperity, Webb City never developed into a modern town. Water was scarce and there was no electricity. The business district had unpaved streets and most of the buildings were built of wood frame and false fronts.

The town began to decline in the late 1920s, as the oil boom faded. In 1928, it was heavily damaged by a tornado, and many of the businesses did not rebuild. The decline continued through the Great Depression. Its high school closed in 1944, and consolidated with the high school in Shidler. The elementary school closed in 1956, and consolidated with the elementary school in Shidler. The Osage Railway was abandoned in 1955.

The 1930 census (the first census taken in Webb City) showed 493 residents. The population declined thereafter.

== Geography ==
Webb City is located 5 miles (8.0 km) northwest of Shidler and 30 miles (48 km) northwest of Pawhuska.

According to the United States Census Bureau, the town has a total area of 0.2 square miles (0.52 km^{2}), all land.

== Demographics ==
Historical population
| Census | Pop. | Note | %± |
|---|---|---|---|
| 1930 | 493 | | — |
| 1940 | 352 | | −28.6% |
| 1950 | 284 | | −19.3% |
| 1960 | 233 | | −18.0% |
| 1970 | 186 | | −20.2% |
| 1980 | 157 | | −15.6% |
| 1990 | 99 | | −36.9% |
| 2000 | 95 | | −4.0% |
| 2010 | 62 | | −34.7% |
| 2020 | 58 | | −6.5% |
U.S. Decennial Census

=== 2020 census ===
As of the 2020 census, Webb City had a population of 58. The median age was 46.0 years. 24.1% of residents were under the age of 18 and 29.3% of residents were 65 years of age or older. For every 100 females there were 100.0 males, and for every 100 females age 18 and over there were 76.0 males age 18 and over.

0.0% of residents lived in urban areas, while 100.0% lived in rural areas.

There were 23 households in Webb City, of which 39.1% had children under the age of 18 living in them. Of all households, 43.5% were married-couple households, 13.0% were households with a male householder and no spouse or partner present, and 26.1% were households with a female householder and no spouse or partner present. About 21.7% of all households were made up of individuals and 17.4% had someone living alone who was 65 years of age or older.

There were 28 housing units, of which 17.9% were vacant. The homeowner vacancy rate was 0.0% and the rental vacancy rate was 66.7%.

Racial composition as of the 2020 census
| Race | Number | Percent |
|---|---|---|
| White | 54 | 93.1% |
| Black or African American | 0 | 0.0% |
| American Indian and Alaska Native | 0 | 0.0% |
| Asian | 0 | 0.0% |
| Native Hawaiian and Other Pacific Islander | 0 | 0.0% |
| Some other race | 0 | 0.0% |
| Two or more races | 4 | 6.9% |
| Hispanic or Latino (of any race) | 1 | 1.7% |

=== 2000 census ===
As of the census of 2000, there were 95 people, 35 households, and 28 families residing in the town. The population density was 378.7 inhabitants per square mile (146.2/km^{2}). There were 46 housing units at an average density of 183.4 per square mile (70.8/km^{2}). The racial makeup of the town was 77.89% White, 10.53% Native American, and 11.58% from two or more races.

There were 35 households, out of which 40.0% had children under the age of 18 living with them, 71.4% were married couples living together, and 20.0% were non-families. 20.0% of all households were made up of individuals, and 5.7% had someone living alone who was 65 years of age or older. The average household size was 2.71 and the average family size was 3.04.

In the town, the population was spread out, with 30.5% under the age of 18, 7.4% from 18 to 24, 28.4% from 25 to 44, 18.9% from 45 to 64, and 14.7% who were 65 years of age or older. The median age was 36 years. For every 100 females, there were 131.7 males. For every 100 females age 18 and over, there were 112.9 males.

The median income for a household in the town was $25,000, and the median income for a family was $17,500. Males had a median income of $29,583 versus $8,750 for females. The per capita income for the town was $9,857. There were 23.1% of families and 37.1% of the population living below the poverty line, including 54.5% of under eighteens and none of those over 64.

== Education ==
It is in Shidler Public Schools.

== Economy ==
The economy of the surrounding area relies on farming and ranching. However, most of the employed town residents work in construction or sales.
