= Lyman, Oklahoma =

Town in Osage County, Oklahoma

Coordinates: 36°50′25″N 96°44′36″W

Lyman was a town in Osage County, Oklahoma, located about 20 miles (30 driving miles) northeast of Ponca City, Oklahoma, and 30 miles southeast of Winfield, Kansas, the two closest population centers. It became an oilfield boomtown shortly after the discovery of the Burbank field in 1920. It was named after A.J. Lyman, who platted the town and sold the lots.

It was substantial enough that beginning July 2nd, 1923 and completing in early 1924, the Osage Railway extended its trackage northwesterly from Shidler, Oklahoma through Webb City to terminate in Lyman. By March 22nd, 1924, a post office had been established. But the oil production decline in the area starting in the late 1920s, and the Great Depression, hit the town hard. The school closed in 1929, the district merging with Webb City. Oil refining in the area tapered off after World War II, and the Osage Railway was abandoned in 1953. The post office closed in February of 1956.

== See also ==
- List of ghost towns in Oklahoma
