= Woodland Public Schools =

Woodland Public Schools or Woodland School District may refer to:

- Woodland Public Schools (Oklahoma)
- Woodland Public Schools (Washington)
