= Whizbang =

Whizbang may refer to:

- Whizbang, Oklahoma, a ghost town
- T40 Whizbang, a tank-mounted multiple rocket launcher
