= Dan Grayson =

American football linebacker (1967–2021)

No. 91
- Position: Linebacker

Personal information
- Born: July 27, 1967; Paris, Texas, U.S.
- Died: August 1, 2021 (aged 54); Kennewick, Washington, U.S.
- Listed height: 6 ft 2 in (1.88 m)
- Listed weight: 240 lb (109 kg)

Career information
- High school: Woodland (Woodland, Washington)
- College: Wenatchee Valley (1986); Washington State (1987–1989)
- NFL draft: 1990: 7th round, 182nd overall pick

Career history
- 1990: Pittsburgh Steelers*
- 1991: San Francisco 49ers*
- 1992: Saskatchewan Roughriders
- * Offseason or practice squad member only

Awards and highlights
- First-team All-Pac-10 (1989)

Danny Ray Grayson (July 27, 1967 – August 1, 2021) was an American professional football linebacker who played one season with the Saskatchewan Roughriders of the Canadian Football League (CFL). He was selected by the Pittsburgh Steelers in the seventh round of the 1990 NFL draft. He played college football at Wenatchee Valley College and Washington State University.

== Early life ==
Danny Ray Grayson was born on July 27, 1967, in Paris, Texas. He attended Woodland High School in Woodland, Washington.

== College career ==
Grayson played college football at Wenatchee Valley College in 1986 as a wingback. He then joined the Washington State Cougars of Washington State University as a walk-on in 1987. After Grayson made a "spectacular" forced fumble in spring practice, head coach Dennis Erickson shouted, “Grayson! I’ll tell you what, you’re on scholarship right now!” Grayson became a starter at middle linebacker in 1988 and was a two-year letterman from 1988 to 1989. He was a first-team All-Pac-10 selection at linebacker his senior year in 1989.

== Professional career ==
Grayson was selected by the Pittsburgh Steelers in the seventh round, with the 182nd overall pick, of the 1990 NFL draft. He officially signed with the team on July 11, 1990. He was waived on August 20, 1990.

Grayson signed with the San Francisco 49ers on March 18, 1991. He was waived by the 49ers on August 21, 1991.

Grayson played in seven games with the Saskatchewan Roughriders of the Canadian Football League in 1992, recording 19 defensive tackles, four special teams tackles, and one sack.

== Personal life ==
Grayson later worked at the Pacific Northwest National Laboratory. He died on August 1, 2021, in Kennewick, Washington at a Quality Inn he had been living at.

About ten years before his death, Grayson started having behavioral difficulties and also underwent a personality change. Due to this, Grayson believed he had chronic traumatic encephalopathy from his football career and had his brain donated to science.
