= Daniel Grayson =

Daniel Grayson may refer to:

- Dan Grayson (1967–2021), American football linebacker
- Daniel Grayson, co-developer of the Macaulay2 computer algebra system
- Daniel Grayson, a character in the TV series Revenge
