= Shidler, Oklahoma =

- City
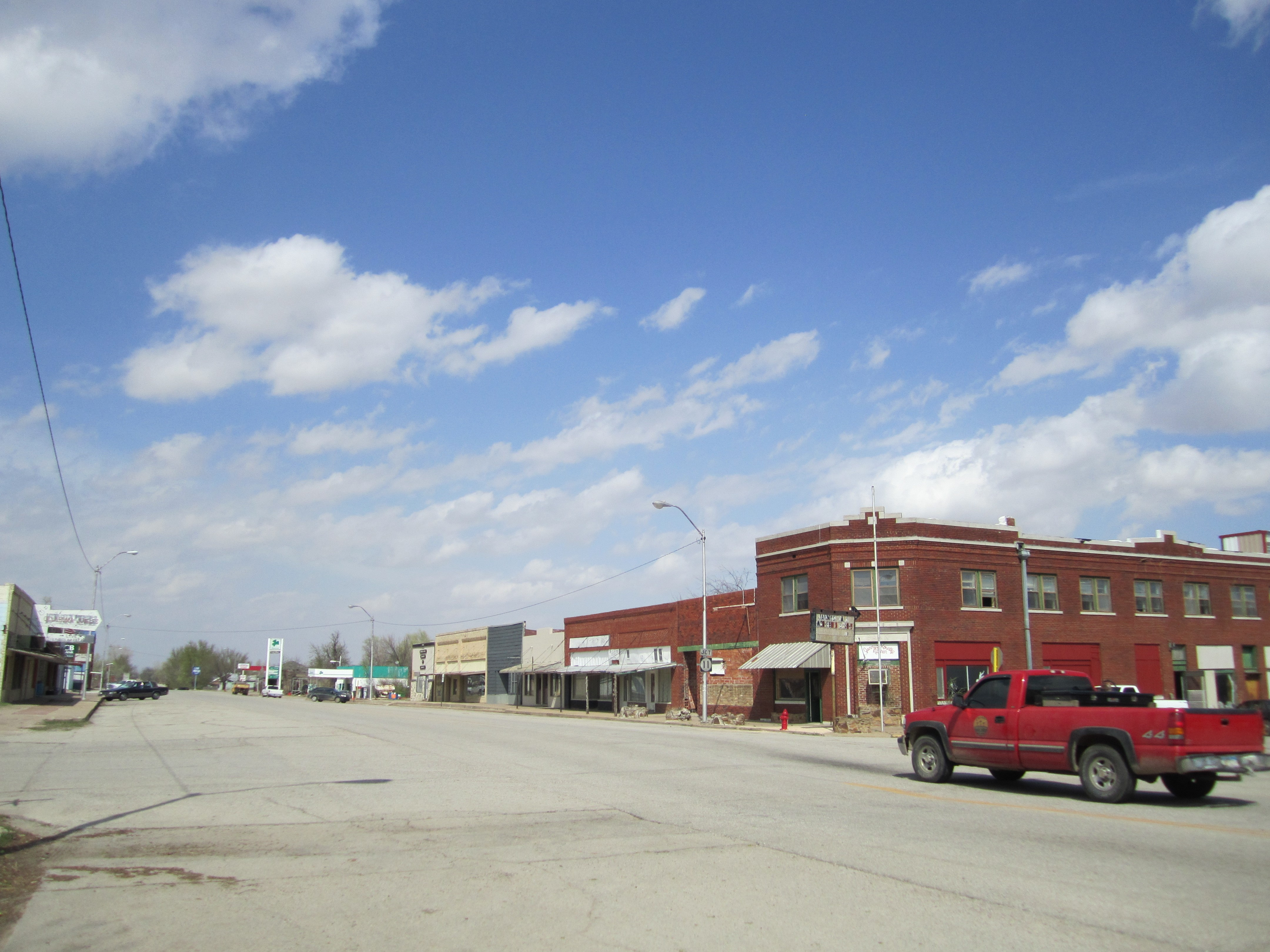
- Downtown Shidler, 2003

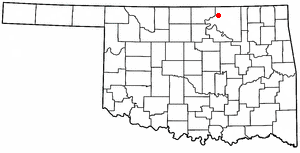
- Location of Shidler, Oklahoma
- Coordinates: 36°46′50″N 96°39′36″W
- Country: United States
- State: Oklahoma
- County: Osage

Area
  - Total: 0.75 sq mi (1.93 km^{2})
  - Land: 0.75 sq mi (1.93 km^{2})
  - Water: 0 sq mi (0.00 km^{2})
- Elevation: 1,161 ft (354 m)

Population (2020)
  - Total: 328
  - Density: 439.5/sq mi (169.71/km^{2})
- Time zone: UTC-6 (Central (CST))
  - Summer (DST): UTC-5 (CDT)
- ZIP code: 74652
- Area codes: 539/918
- FIPS code: 40-67200
- GNIS feature ID: 2411890

Shidler is a city in Osage County, Oklahoma, United States. The population was 328 in the 2020 census, a decline from the figure of 441 recorded in 2010.

== History ==
Shidler was founded in December 1921 and named for Eugene S. Shidler, a Pawhuska banker and rancher. The town grew rapidly to a population of approximately 5,000 due to the discovery of petroleum nearby (see Whizbang) and the arrival of the Osage Railway (one of the Muskogee Roads) in February 1922. In that year, Shidler had 19 oil-well supply businesses and six plants manufacturing gasoline. Shidler had a reputation for lawlessness, with bank and highway robberies common. By the late 1920s, the oil boom had subsided and Shidler began to lose population. Shidler's population in the 1930 census was 1,177 and the downward trend continued. Shidler today is a quiet farming and ranching community, although there is still some petroleum production in the area.

During World War II, citizens of Shidler actively lobbied to prevent the internment of the Yamamoto family from Shidler. Due to the efforts of U.S. Senator Elmer Thomas, the internment order was lifted.

== Geography ==
Shidler is located 29 miles (47 km) northwest of Pawhuska, the seat of Osage County.

According to the United States Census Bureau, the city has a total area of 0.8 square miles (2.1 km^{2}), all land.

== Demographics ==
Historical population
Census	Pop.	Note	%±
1930	1,177		—
1940	718		−39.0%
1950	840		17.0%
1960	870		3.6%
1970	717		−17.6%
1980	708		−1.3%
1990	487		−31.2%
2000	520		6.8%
2010	441		−15.2%
2020	328		−25.6%
U.S. Decennial Census

=== 2020 census ===
As of the 2020 census, Shidler had a population of 328. The median age was 41.0 years. 27.4% of residents were under the age of 18 and 19.5% of residents were 65 years of age or older. For every 100 females there were 100.0 males, and for every 100 females age 18 and over there were 95.1 males age 18 and over.

0% of residents lived in urban areas, while 100.0% lived in rural areas.

There were 132 households in Shidler, of which 28.8% had children under the age of 18 living in them. Of all households, 38.6% were married-couple households, 24.2% were households with a male householder and no spouse or partner present, and 31.1% were households with a female householder and no spouse or partner present. About 35.6% of all households were made up of individuals and 22.0% had someone living alone who was 65 years of age or older.

There were 175 housing units, of which 24.6% were vacant. Among occupied housing units, 79.5% were owner-occupied and 20.5% were renter-occupied. The homeowner vacancy rate was 3.6% and the rental vacancy rate was 31.8%.

Racial composition as of the 2020 census
Race	Percent
White	77.4%
Black or African American	0.3%
American Indian and Alaska Native	10.4%
Asian	0%
Native Hawaiian and Other Pacific Islander	0%
Some other race	0%
Two or more races	11.9%
Hispanic or Latino (of any race)	0.9%

=== 2000 census ===
As of the 2000 census, there were 520 people, 231 households, and 148 families residing in the city. The population density was 678.8 inhabitants per square mile (262.1/km^{2}). There were 278 housing units at an average density of 362.9 per square mile (140.1/km^{2}). The racial makeup of the city was 81.35% White, 14.04% Native American, 0.96% from other races, and 3.65% from two or more races. Hispanic or Latino of any race were 2.50% of the population.

There were 231 households, out of which 25.5% had children under the age of 18 living with them, 49.8% were married couples living together, 9.5% had a female householder with no husband present, and 35.9% were non-families. 31.6% of all households were made up of individuals, and 17.3% had someone living alone who was 65 years of age or older. The average household size was 2.25 and the average family size was 2.78.

In the city, the population was spread out, with 23.5% under the age of 18, 9.6% from 18 to 24, 22.5% from 25 to 44, 23.1% from 45 to 64, and 21.3% who were 65 years of age or older. The median age was 41 years. For every 100 females, there were 92.6 males. For every 100 females age 18 and over, there were 86.0 males.

The median income for a household in the city was $29,732, and the median income for a family was $35,156. Males had a median income of $31,932 versus $17,143 for females. The per capita income for the city was $16,245. About 11.0% of families and 15.9% of the population were below the poverty line, including 23.1% of those under age 18 and 13.5% of those age 65 or over.

== Education ==
The town is home of the Shidler Public Schools Fighting Tigers. The school has about 250 students in kindergarten through 12th grade. The school brings in students from the surrounding towns of Grainola, Foraker, Webb City, Kaw City, and part of Burbank.
