= Osage Railway =

Railway

Overview
- Locale: Oklahoma
- Dates of operation: 1922–1953

Technical
- Track gauge: 4 ft 8 1/2 in (1,435 mm)
- Length: 16 mi (26 km)

The Osage Railway (/ˈoʊseɪdʒ/ OH-sayj) was incorporated in 1921 to accommodate traffic from the oil fields located in the Osage Nation. The first part of its mainline was constructed in 1922 from a connection with the Midland Valley Railroad at Foraker, Oklahoma, to the town of Shidler, Oklahoma, about 10 miles southwest. The line was independently owned from the Midland Valley, but was jointly operated with the Midland Valley and two other lines as part of the Muskogee Roads. Beginning July 2, 1923 and completing in early 1924, the Osage Railway's trackage was extended northwesterly from Shidler through Webb City to Lyman, Oklahoma, about another 6 miles.

Oil production in the area began to decline in the late 1920s and the start of the Great Depression lowered demand and prices. The railroad managed to survive for a time by prudent management, but the entire line was abandoned in 1953.

== Osage Railroad ==
The Osage Railway should not be confused with the Osage Railroad (ORR). That company, a unit of Watco, bought a 35-mile-long rail line between Tulsa and Barnsdall, Oklahoma from the Union Pacific (UP) in 1990. That trackage had been built as part of the Midland Valley in 1905. It was included when the Midland Valley was acquired by a subsidiary of the Missouri Pacific Railroad in 1967, and became a UP line when the Missouri Pacific was merged into the UP in 1997. But Watco abandoned the line in 2000, and at least part of the route subsequently became a multi-use rail trail.
