= Cedar Creek Grist Mill =

- U.S. National Register of Historic Places
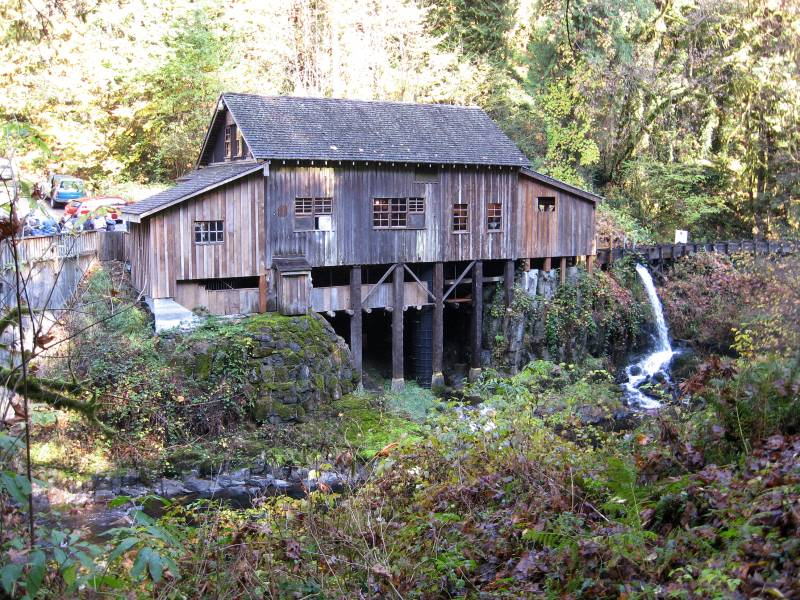
- Cedar Creek Grist Mill

- Location within Washington (state)
- Location: 43907 Northeast Grist Mill Road, Woodland, Washington
- Coordinates: 45°56′18″N 122°35′00″W
- Area: 1 acre (0.40 ha)
- Built: 1876
- Built by: George W. Woodham A.C. Reid
- NRHP reference No.: 75001844
- Added to NRHP: March 26, 1975

The Cedar Creek Grist Mill is a historical grist mill located in Woodland, Washington listed on the National Register of Historic Places. The mill was built in 1876 by George W. Woodham family and A.C. Reid. The remains of the dam which supplied water to the mill were removed in 1950s. The mill was restored to working condition in the 1980s and now operates as a museum.
