= Burbank School District 20 =

Former school district in Burbank, Oklahoma

Burbank School District 20 was a school district headquartered in Burbank, Oklahoma.

== History ==
Circa 1904, a school opened in Burbank.

A three-story school building opened in 1920. A gymnasium was built in 1938.

The student population decreased as the population of Burbank did so. In 1968 the high school closed. In 1999, the state legislature approved a law that allowed parents to send their children to school districts in places other than where they lived, and several Burbank residents moved their children to schools in communities in which they held employment. From 1999 to 2001, the number of students declined by 27. In 2001 the enrollment was 42, and there were 11 employees. The school was having financial problems.

In November 2001, due to a decline in students, the school board decided to hold a vote on whether to dissolve the school district. In 2002, the school district was to close, with its territory divided between existing districts: Shidler Public Schools, Woodland School District, and Ponca City Public Schools. There were five students in the eighth grade at the time of closing. The Shidler district was scheduled to take the school building and its contents, and Tulsa World stated that the anticipated further outcome would that the Shidler district would give those to the municipal government in Burbank.

In 2023 the former high school was listed for sale on an online website, with the website putting it on a listing for single family houses. The 1.76-acre (0.71 ha) land, which includes a 17,000-square-foot (1,600 m^{2}) school building, was constructed in 1924. The property includes a 250-seat auditorium, a baseball facility, and a gymnasium. Its sale price was $60,000.

== Operations ==
Towards the end of the district's life, students were sometimes taken to other schools to do other activities.

== Athletics ==
At one time the school had separate basketball teams for boys and girls, then later had an all gender team due to having few players. Circa 1999, the lack of players meant no more basketball games.
