= Muskogee Company =

The Muskogee Company was a holding company based in Philadelphia. It was originally founded in Delaware on February 27, 1923. The company owned several railroads, which shipped oil and coal to western regions of the United States.

== History ==
The company's founding officers were brothers C. Jared Ingersoll, industrialist, as president, and John H. W. Ingersoll, attorney and industrialist, as vice president and treasurer. The Muskogee Company owned large interests in several railroads in and about northeastern Oklahoma.

According to a historical summary written by the DeGolyer Library at Southern Methodist University, which holds the archives of the Muskogee Company, the company history actually began in the 1890s, when a group of Philadelphia businessmen, headed by C. J. Ingersoll, built the Choctaw, Oklahoma & Gulf Railroad (CO&G), which ran from Hartford, Arkansas to McAlester, Oklahoma (then known as Indian Territory). These men intended the railroad to serve their coal mines in Arkansas, the most notable of which were: the Sebastian County Coal & Mining Co., American Smokeless Coal Co., Mazzrad Coal & Mining Co., and Garland Coal & Mining Co.

In 1902, Ingersoll's group sold the CO&G to a competitor and began the Midland Valley Railroad, which would run from Ft. Smith, Arkansas to Wichita, Kansas. The route was to go northwest from Ft. Smith through Muskogee, Tulsa and the Osage Nation into Kansas, where there were other coal interests.

Coal shipments from company-owned mines to colder western regions of the United States via the Muskogee Company-owned Midland Valley was the original plan for profit. Oil discoveries in Oklahoma later produced lucrative revenues for the Muskogee Company railroads that were strategically located in high production areas of the state.

The railroads that fell under the control and common management of the Muskogee Company were colloquially referred to as the Muskogee Roads. The Muskogee Roads were made up of the Midland Valley Railroad, the Kansas, Oklahoma and Gulf Railway, the Oklahoma City-Ada-Atoka Railway, and indirectly, the Osage Railway. C. Jared Ingersoll was a majority owner of the Midland Valley since its beginning on February 1, 1903, but the Muskogee Company took ownership of the line after its 1923 formation. The Osage Railway, which was affiliated but independently owned and operated, was built during the early 1920s to accommodate traffic from the oil fields located in the Osage Nation. The Kansas, Oklahoma and Gulf was in receivership when acquired by the Muskogee Company in 1926. Finally, the Oklahoma City-Ada-Atoka Railway was purchased by the Muskogee Company in 1929, at which point the Ingersoll interests owned and operated four different railways with a total of 756 miles of trackage. The Osage Railroad was abandoned in 1953. In 1963, the Texas & Pacific, which was a subsidiary of the Missouri Pacific Railroad, acquired the other three lines. The Oklahoma City-Ada-Atoka was sold to the Atchison, Topeka & Santa Fe that same year, while the others were consolidated into the Texas & Pacific.
