= Shidler Public Schools =

School district in Oklahoma, United States

Shidler Public Schools is a school district headquartered in Shidler, Oklahoma. It includes W. G. Ward Elementary School, and Shidler Middle and High Schools.

The district boundary is mostly in Osage County and includes Shidler, Foraker, Grainola, Webb City, and a portion of Burbank. A portion of the district is in Kay County, where it includes Kaw City.

== History ==
In 1946, a $17,000 bond passed.

In 2002, Burbank School District 20, the school district of Burbank, Oklahoma, closed and dissolved. Shidler absorbed portions of the Burbank district, including the Burbank school building. Tulsa World stated that the anticipated further outcome would that the Shidler district would give those to the municipal government in Burbank.

In 2018, Enel Green Power funded some STEM education-related initiatives in the district.

In 2018, the student count was 250, and the district had school four days per week.

The current middle-high (secondary) school building opened in 2021.

== Notable alumni ==
- Rance Howard (1928–2017), film and television actor, attended Shidler High School.
