= Oklahoma City–Ada–Atoka Railway =

Railway system in Oklahoma, US

Oklahoma City – Ada – Atoka Railway
Overview
- Headquarters: Muskogee, Oklahoma
- Locale: Oklahoma
- Dates of operation: 1923–1964
- Successor: Atchison, Topeka and Santa Fe Railway

Technical
- Track gauge: 4 ft 8 1/2 in (1,435 mm) standard gauge

The Oklahoma City – Ada – Atoka Railway (OCAA) was formed from trackage from Oklahoma City to Atoka via Shawnee, Ada, and Coalgate, Oklahoma. Atoka to Coalgate had been built between 1882 and 1886 as feeder to the old Missouri–Kansas–Texas Railroad (Katy) main line, and Coalgate-Shawnee-Oklahoma City had been constructed by Katy affiliates, and specifically the first 40 miles northwest out of Coalgate having been built by the Texas and Oklahoma Railroad in 1902. The remaining 78 miles into Oklahoma City were built in the 1903-1904 timeframe by that line’s successor, the Missouri, Kansas and Oklahoma Railroad Company (of 1903). These properties were not included in the 1923 reorganization of the Katy, and were put in the OCAA instead. The OCAA was sold to the Muskogee Company (which also controlled the Midland Valley Railroad and the Kansas, Oklahoma and Gulf Railway) in 1929, becoming one of the Muskogee Roads.

In 1960 OCAA reported 20 million net ton-miles of revenue freight and no passengers on its 104 miles of road.

In 1964 the OCAA was sold to the Texas and Pacific Railway subsidiary of the Missouri Pacific Railroad, which briefly operated the property before selling it to the Atchison, Topeka and Santa Fe Railway, with which it merged on December 1, 1967.

By 1985 the entire rail line, except for a short stretch east of Oklahoma City, had been abandoned.
