= Carpenter's Bluff, Texas =

Unincorporated community in Texas, US

- Unincorporated Community
- Location within Texas Carpenter's Bluff (the United States)
- Coordinates: 33°45′14.4″N 96°24′46.8″W
- Country: United States
- State: Texas
- County: Grayson
- Settled: 1860
- Founder: E. E. Carpenter
- Elevation: 535 ft (163 m)
- Time zone: UTC-6 (CST)

Carpenter's Bluff is a community in northeastern Grayson County, Texas, United States, located on the Red River and Farm to Market Road 120, twelve miles northeast of Sherman, connecting Grayson County and Bryan County, Oklahoma. Settled circa 1860, it derived its name from that of an early settler, E. E. Carpenter, who operated a ferry across the Red River. In the early 20th century, the Missouri, Oklahoma and Gulf Railway constructed a bridge across the Red River at Carpenter's Bluff. By 1936, Carpenter's Bluff had a population of seventy-five and four businesses. Ten years later, the population had increased to 120, and the town still had four businesses.

== Carpenter's Bluff Bridge ==
Completed in the late summer of 1910 as a railroad bridge for the Missouri, Oklahoma & Gulf Railroad (MO&G) line, this landmark structure was part of a line through Grayson County to connect with other railways in order to secure better freight rates for their shipments from the Oklahoma coal mines. The bridge was designed to withstand major floods such as the one in 1908 that had destroyed several area bridges. Its design also included a wagon shelf, an extra lane to serve travelers on foot and horseback, as well as horse-drawn vehicles, all of whom had to pay a toll for its use. In 1921, ownership passed to the Kansas, Oklahoma and Gulf Railway (KO&G), which maintained the line until 1965, when the company ceased operations in Texas due to declining rail traffic. The Texas and Pacific Railway maintained the bridge for a brief time and then deeded it to the counties of Grayson and Bryan. County commissioners agreed to convert the structure for vehicular traffic, and upon completion of that work, the bridge was opened as a free public thoroughfare.
