= Hulda Klager Lilac Gardens =

Historic gardens in Woodland, Washington, United States

- U.S. National Register of Historic Places
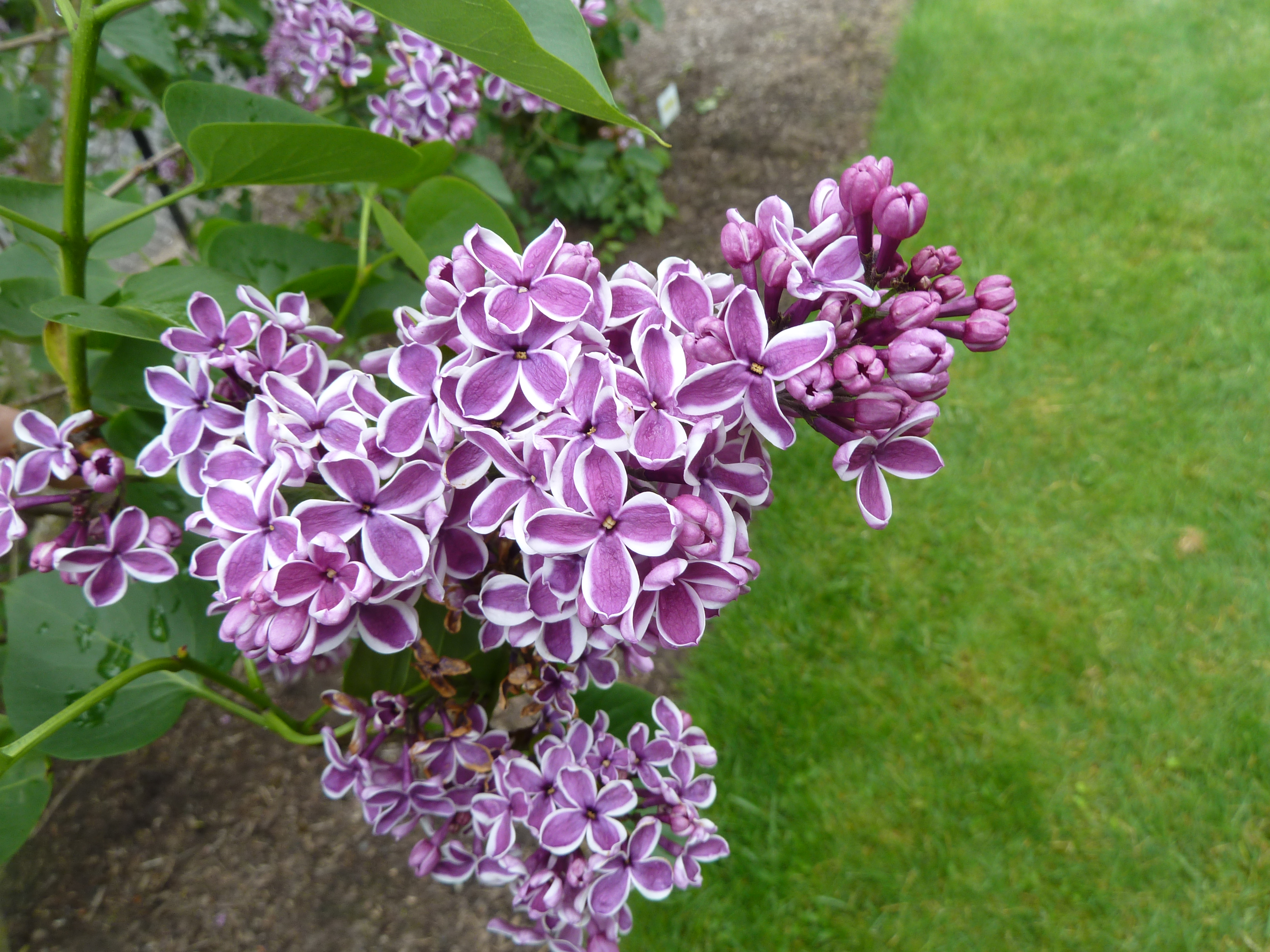
- "Sensation" lilac at Hulda Klager

- Location within Washington (state) Location within the United States
- Location: 115 South Pekin Road; Woodland, Washington
- Coordinates: 45.8972°N 122.7534°W
- Area: 7 acres (0.028 km^{2})
- Built: 1889
- Architectural style: Victorian
- Website: lilacgardens.com
- NRHP reference No.: 75001847
- Added to NRHP: July 17, 1975

The Hulda Klager Lilac Gardens are nonprofit botanical gardens specializing in lilacs, located at 115 South Pekin Road, Woodland, Washington. The gardens open in Spring mid-April for Lilac Days 10:00am–4:00pm daily *check website for dates; After Lilac Days check website for current days/hours. There is an admission fee charged payable at the cashier station(cash/check/card). A small admission supports the operation of the gardens. There is also an annual plant sale during Lilac Days only. The house and museum are only open during Lilac Days.

== History ==
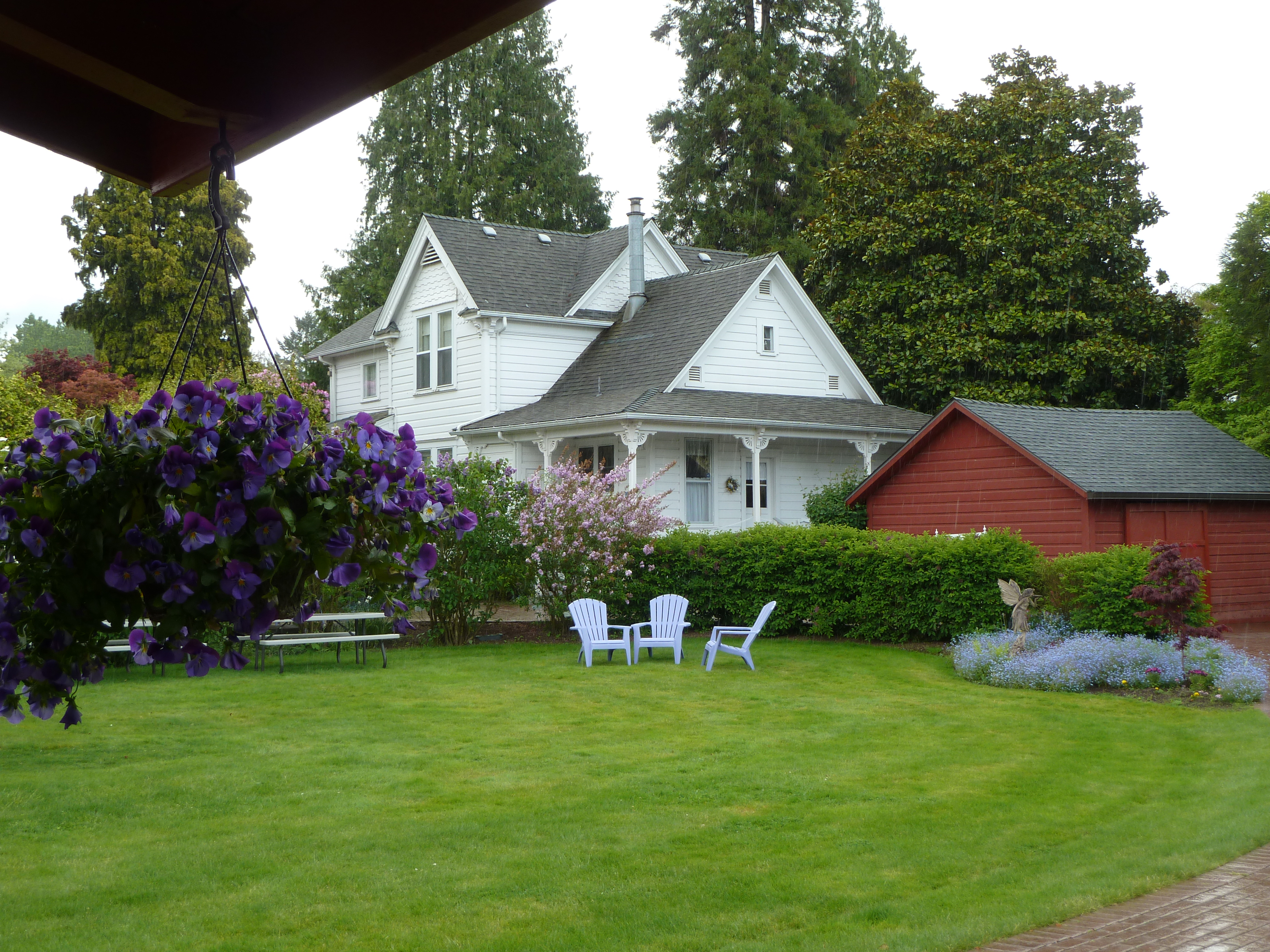
Hulda Klagers house and lawn.

The gardens were established by Hulda Klager (1863–1960), who began hybridizing lilacs in 1905. She was inspired by the work of Luther Burbank. By 1910 she had created 14 new varieties, and in 1920 she started showing her lilacs every spring.

In 1948 the gardens were flooded, only the larger trees survived. People who had purchased plants in the past returned starts to Hulda and the gardens were replanted. Two years later in 1950 the gardens were once again open for the annual "Lilac Week".

Hulda eventually developed over 250 varieties. After her death, the gardens were preserved and then organized into a nonprofit foundation in 1976.

Today the gardens contain more than 90 varieties of lilacs, as well as Victorian gardens and a farmhouse.

== See also ==
- List of botanical gardens in the United States
