= Woodland Public Schools (Oklahoma) =

School district in Oklahoma, United States

Woodland Public Schools, also known as Woodland School District, is a school district headquartered in Fairfax, Oklahoma. It has an elementary school, a middle school, and a high school.

The district boundary is mostly in Osage County and includes Fairfax, a portion of Burbank, and Gray Horse. It is also partially in Pawnee County, where it includes Ralston.

As of 2022 the high school has Osage language as a class for world languages.

== History ==
It was established in 1990 when the Fairfax and Ralston school districts merged.

In 2002 the Burbank school district dissolved, with a portion going to Woodland.

Beginning in the 2013–2014 school year, the district stopped sending certain data to the Oklahoma Department of Education and the United States Department of Education (ED). Circa 2021 the ED asked about 17,000 school districts to respond to a request, and Woodland was the sole district not to comply.
