= Woodland Public Schools (Washington) =

School district in Washington, United States

Address
- 800 3rd Street Woodland, Washington, 98674; United States
- Coordinates: 45°54′15″N 122°44′55″W

District information
- Grades: K-12
- Superintendent: Asha Riley
- NCES District ID: 5310050

Students and staff
- Students: 2,432 (2022-2023)
- Teachers: 140.86 (on an FTE basis)
- Student–teacher ratio: 17.27

Other information
- Website: www.woodlandschools.org

Woodland Public Schools (WPS) or Woodland School District #404 (WSD) is a school district headquartered in Woodland, Washington.

It includes Woodland and Cougar in Cowlitz County. It also includes sections of Clark County.

As of 2020 it has approximately 2,250 students.

== History ==
In January 2007, the district added impact fees on houses in the Clark County section and in houses in the city limits of Woodland. That year it proposed that Cowlitz County add impact fees on houses in the district in order to pay for new facilities. The Cowlitz county attorney stated that he was not sure whether the plan complied with Washington state law.

In 2007, superintendent Bill Hundley chose to retire.

In 2015, four of the five members of the board of education signed a letter in support of superintendent Michael Green. The other board member was absent. The board collectively stated that the school district was inaccurately being depicted in the media as being in a disarray.

== Schools ==
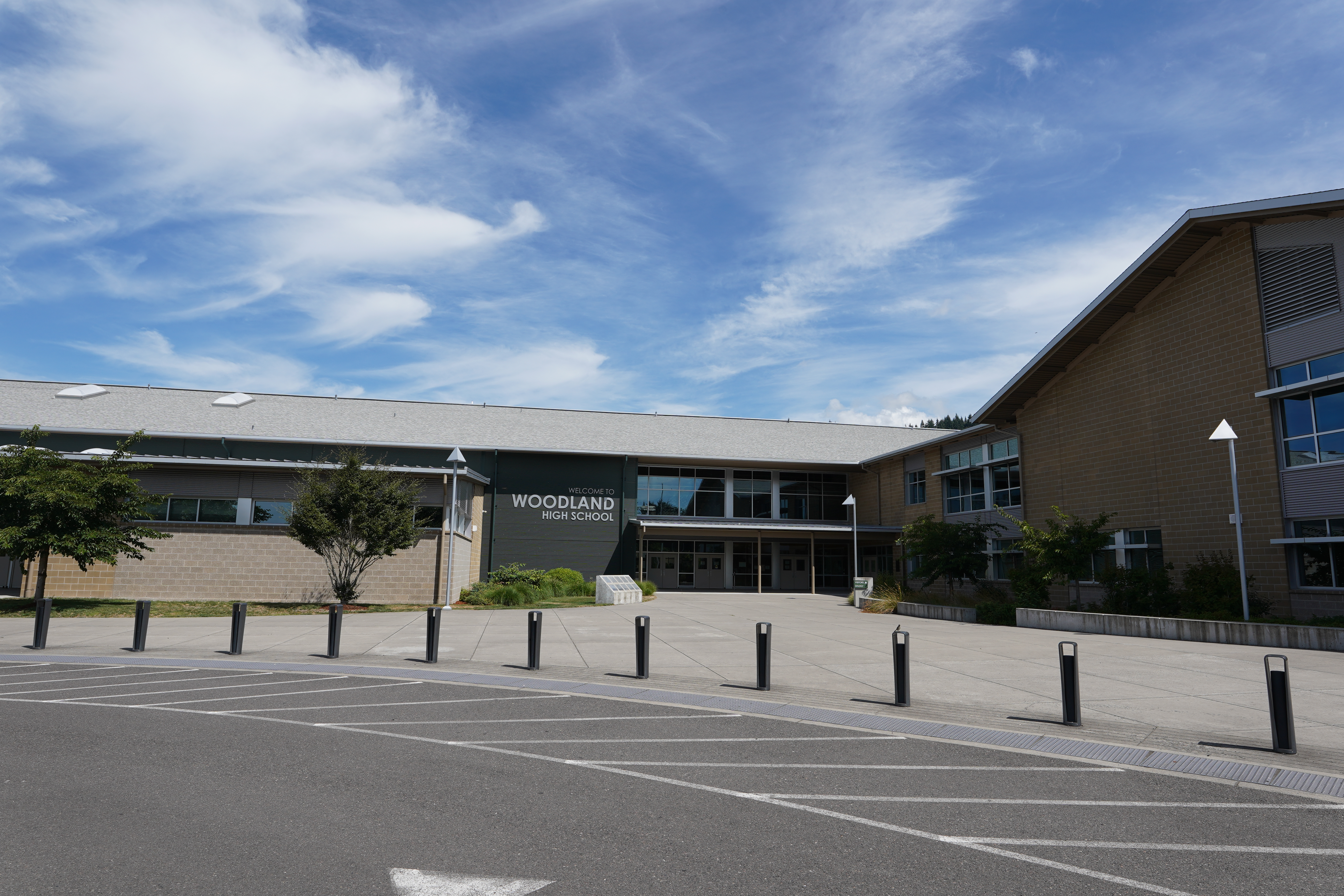
Woodland High School

=== Secondary ===
- Woodland High School
- Woodland Middle School
  - In 2015, there was turmoil as the school district leadership removed multiple employees from their posts. There were protests against the district leadership with parents criticizing a perceived lack of openness with the community. That year it became a grade 5–8 facility and Jake Hall became the principal.
- TEAM High School (alternative)

=== Primary ===
- Columbia Elementary School
- North Fork Elementary School
- Yale Elementary School

=== Alternative ===
- Lewis River Academy
- TEAM High School
