= Litchfield and Madison Railway =

Railway in Illinois

The Litchfield and Madison Railway (reporting mark LM) was a Class I railroad in Illinois in the United States. Its nickname was the St. Louis Gateway Route. The railroad operated 44 miles (71 km) of track from its creation in 1900 until it was absorbed by the Chicago and North Western Railway in 1958.

== History ==
In 1889-1890, the Chicago, Peoria and St. Louis Railroad began constructing a railroad line at Winston, Illinois, about a mile from Litchfield, Illinois, with the intent of the line eventually reaching Madison, Illinois. At the same time, another railroad, called the St. Louis and Eastern, began building a line from Litchfield to Glen Carbon, Illinois, also with the goal of the line extending to Madison. Sometime in the 1890s, the Chicago, Peoria and St. Louis struck an accord to lease some unbuilt right-of-way from the St. Louis and Eastern. Both lines eventually extended into Madison.

The Litchfield and Madison was incorporated on March 1, 1900 by James Duncan to take over an isolated line of the Chicago, Peoria and St. Louis Railroad between Litchfield and Madison. At that time, Duncan also took over the Chicago, Peoria and St. Louis. In 1926, the L&M constructed a connection to the Chicago and North Western at Benld, Illinois. The railroad served as the entry to East St. Louis, Illinois for both the Chicago and North Western and the Illinois Central Railroad. In addition, in the 1925-1926 time frame, the C&NW obtained trackage rights over the L&M from Benld to East St. Louis. At the same time, the L&M received minor reciprocal trackage rights over the C&NW.

During its life, the L&M was known for being both a bridge railroad and also a hauler of coal. Most of the coal consisted of loads brought southbound to the St. Louis area from mines in the area.

The railroad's physical plant included a depot and office at Staunton, Illinois. A timetable dated November 14, 1909 showed a daily round trip between Madison and C. B. & Q. Junction (south of Litchfield). And a timetable dated July 1925 listed five trains each way between Glen Carbon and Madison. These seem to be through trains of the Illinois Central Railroad and New York, Chicago and St. Louis Railroad utilizing the L&M trackage as a gateway to St Louis.

Apart from the C&NW, the L&M also connected with the Illinois Central, the New York, Chicago and St. Louis Railroad in East St. Louis, the Alton and Southern Railway, the Illinois Terminal Railroad, the Southern Railway, the Terminal Railroad Association of St. Louis and the Wabash Railroad.

The railroad was headquartered in Edwardsville, Illinois.

== Motive power ==
During the steam era, the L&M operated 2-8-0 steam locomotives (also known as Consolidations) and 2-8-2 steam locomotives (also known as Mikados or Mikes). In the early diesel era, the L&M operated one Baldwin VO-1000 and three ALCO RS-3s.

== Merger into the Chicago and North Western ==
On August 1, 1957, lawyers for the Chicago and North Western filed paperwork to acquire the Litchfield and Madison outright. The Interstate Commerce Commission quickly granted the C&NW's application. The purchase price for the railroad was $8 million.

The Litchfield and Madison was formally merged into the Chicago and North Western on January 2, 1958.
