= Chicago, Peoria and St. Louis Railroad =

Railroad in Illinois, United States

CP&StL as of 1918

The Chicago, Peoria and St. Louis Railroad (CP&StL) was a railroad in the U.S. state of Illinois that operated a main line between Pekin (near Peoria) and Madison (near St. Louis) via Springfield. Its property was sold at foreclosure to several new companies in the 1920s; the portion north of Springfield has since become the Illinois and Midland Railroad, while the remainder has been abandoned, except for a portion near St. Louis that is now owned by the Norfolk Southern Railway.

== History ==
The earliest predecessor of the CP&StL was the Illinois River Railroad, chartered by the Illinois General Assembly in February 1853 to build a line from Jacksonville north-northeasterly to La Salle through the valley of the Illinois River. The line was opened from Virginia to Pekin in 1859, and in May 1864 the property was sold at foreclosure to the Peoria, Pekin and Jacksonville Railroad, which had been incorporated in June 1863 for this purpose. The company bought a line from Pekin to Peoria from the Peoria and Hannibal Railroad in May 1868, and in 1869 the road was extended southwest to the Toledo, Wabash and Western Railway (Wabash) at Jacksonville. The segment beyond Pekin acquired in 1868 was sold in November 1880 to the Peoria and Pekin Union Railway, a terminal railroad serving those cities.

A second line was chartered in March 1869 as the Springfield and Northwestern Railroad, to build from Springfield north-northwesterly to Rock Island. It was completed in December 1874 from Springfield (also on the line of the Wabash) to Havana, where trains entered the Peoria, Pekin and Jacksonville Railroad to reach Peoria via trackage rights. On opening, the road was leased to the Indianapolis, Bloomington and Western Railway (which had lines east from Havana and Pekin), but the lease was forfeited in 1875, and the Springfield and Northwestern Railroad was soon reorganized as the Springfield and Northwestern Railway, incorporated in May 1878.

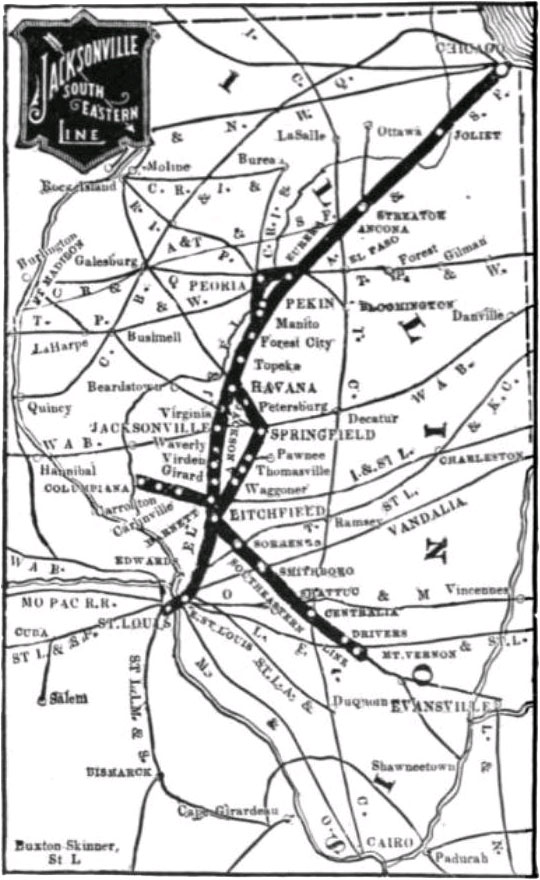
Map of the Jacksonville Southeastern Line, including the through service to Chicago

Both lines, connecting Jacksonville and Springfield to Pekin, were sold to the Wabash in 1881, but, after the Wabash defaulted, the lines were sold in mid-1888 to a new Chicago, Peoria and St. Louis Railway, a subsidiary of the Jacksonville Southeastern Railway (reorganized in 1890 as the Jacksonville, Louisville and St. Louis Railway). The latter company, with a main line from Jacksonville southeast to Centralia via Litchfield, soon assembled a system - the "Jacksonville Southeastern Line" - by leasing the St. Louis and Chicago Railway (Springfield to Litchfield) in September 1890, and building, as a part of the Chicago, Peoria, and St. Louis, a line from Litchfield southwest to Madison (near East St. Louis). The connection to East St. Louis was completed in November 1890, and in December the company inaugurated, in cooperation with the Atchison, Topeka and Santa Fe Railroad, a through Pullman car passenger service between Chicago and St. Louis.

The system was broken up in 1893, as the Jacksonville, Louisville and St. Louis and Chicago, Peoria and St. Louis were placed under separate receivers. The latter's lease of the St. Louis and Chicago expired in December 1895, and that company soon became part of the new St. Louis, Peoria and Northern Railway. This left the Chicago, Peoria and St. Louis Railway, reorganized in January 1896 as the Chicago, Peoria and St. Louis Railroad of Illinois, with its original lines from Pekin to Jacksonville and Springfield and an isolated branch between Litchfield and Madison. Unable to use the direct line from Springfield to Litchfield, the CP&StL acquired trackage rights over the St. Louis, Chicago and St. Paul Railroad ("Bluff Line") to Waverly and the Jacksonville Southeastern to Litchfield; the route was modified in July 1896 to use the latter line from Jacksonville to Litchfield. Several years later, the CP&StL would acquire the Bluff Line as its St. Louis connection, and sell off the Litchfield-Madison line.

The Bluff Line began as the St. Louis, Jerseyville and Springfield Railroad, incorporated in November 1880 to build from Springfield to the Mississippi River near Grafton. The line was completed in 1882 from Bates, on the Wabash west of Springfield, through Jerseyville to Dow, where it descended the Mississippi River's bluffs to Elsah and followed the shoreline to Grafton. After a lease to the St. Louis and Central Illinois Railroad, begun in December 1886, the line was reorganized in November 1888 as the St. Louis, Alton and Springfield Railroad, which had been incorporated in June 1887. In 1889, that company built a branch from Dow to the river at Lockhaven, and then along the Mississippi to Alton, as well as a connection from Elsah to Lockhaven. (The Dow-Elsah segment would later be abandoned.) Another reorganization, in September 1892, created the St. Louis, Chicago and St. Paul Railroad which built a direct entrance to Springfield from Loami (south of Bates), as well as an extension from Alton to Granite City in July 1894. The company was reorganized yet again in October 1897, forming the St. Louis, Chicago and St. Paul Railway of Illinois. Finally, in March 1900, the Bluff Line was merged into the Chicago, Peoria and St. Louis Railway of Illinois, a reorganization of the Chicago, Peoria and St. Louis Railroad of Illinois, and at the same time the Litchfield-Madison line was split off as a new Litchfield and Madison Railway, which the CP&StL continued to operate under lease until June 1904.

This consolidated company, with a main line from Pekin to Granite City/Madison, and branches to Jacksonville and Grafton, continued to have financial problems, and the final company to bear the name, the Chicago, Peoria and St. Louis Railroad, was incorporated in December 1909 and took over the property of the Chicago, Peoria and St. Louis Railway of Illinois in January 1913. Operations continued until November 1924, when four separate companies purchased portions of the property at foreclosure sale:

1. Alton and Eastern Railroad, Granite City to Grafton, including the lease of the Alton Terminal Railway; leased to the Illinois Terminal Company in 1930 and merged in 1937; now part of the Norfolk Southern Railway
2. Chicago, Springfield and St. Louis Railway, Lockhaven to Springfield; later abandoned
3. Springfield, Havana and Peoria Railroad, Springfield to Pekin; leased to the Chicago and Illinois Midland Railway in 1926 and merged in 1936; now part of the Illinois and Midland Railroad
4. Jacksonville and Havana Railroad, Jacksonville to Havana; later abandoned
