= Grainola, Oklahoma =

- Town
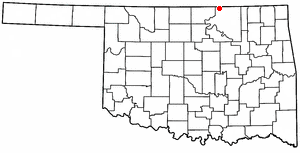
- Location of Grainola, Oklahoma
- Coordinates: 36°56′17″N 96°38′56″W
- Country: United States
- State: Oklahoma
- County: Osage

Area
  - Total: 0.24 sq mi (0.62 km^{2})
  - Land: 0.24 sq mi (0.62 km^{2})
  - Water: 0 sq mi (0.00 km^{2})
- Elevation: 1,207 ft (368 m)

Population (2020)
  - Total: 31
  - Density: 129/sq mi (49.7/km^{2})
- Time zone: UTC-6 (Central (CST))
  - Summer (DST): UTC-5 (CDT)
- FIPS code: 40-30750
- GNIS feature ID: 2412697

Grainola is a town in northwest Osage County, Oklahoma, United States. As of the 2020 census, Grainola had a population of 31. The main industry of the area is cattle ranching. The town name was invented in March 1910.

== History ==
Grainola was originally named Salt Creek for a nearby tributary of the Arkansas River. The Salt Creek post office opened in November 1906, and the townsite was officially organized in 1909. The name was changed to Grainola in March 1910. The town supported nearby farmers and cattle ranchers, but has experienced a prolonged decline since 1920, when it had an estimated population of 500.

== Geography ==
Grainola is located 11 miles (18 km) north of Shidler (the nearest post office) and 40 miles (64 km) northwest of Pawhuska.

According to the United States Census Bureau, the town has a total area of 0.2 square miles (0.52 km^{2}), all land.

== Demographics ==
Historical population
Census	Pop.	Note	%±
1930	197		—
1940	157		−20.3%
1950	79		−49.7%
1960	67		−15.2%
1970	66		−1.5%
1980	67		1.5%
1990	58		−13.4%
2000	31		−46.6%
2010	31		0.0%
2020	31		0.0%
U.S. Decennial Census

=== 2020 census ===
As of the 2020 census, Grainola had a population of 31. The median age was 36.3 years. 35.5% of residents were under the age of 18 and 12.9% of residents were 65 years of age or older. For every 100 females there were 121.4 males, and for every 100 females age 18 and over there were 122.2 males age 18 and over.

0.0% of residents lived in urban areas, while 100.0% lived in rural areas.

There were 12 households in Grainola, of which 58.3% had children under the age of 18 living in them. Of all households, 58.3% were married-couple households, 25.0% were households with a male householder and no spouse or partner present, and 16.7% were households with a female householder and no spouse or partner present. About 8.3% of all households were made up of individuals and 8.3% had someone living alone who was 65 years of age or older.

There were 12 housing units, of which 0.0% were vacant. The homeowner vacancy rate was 0.0% and the rental vacancy rate was 0.0%.

Racial composition as of the 2020 census
Race	Number	Percent
White	20	64.5%
Black or African American	0	0.0%
American Indian and Alaska Native	2	6.5%
Asian	0	0.0%
Native Hawaiian and Other Pacific Islander	0	0.0%
Some other race	0	0.0%
Two or more races	9	29.0%
Hispanic or Latino (of any race)	1	3.2%

=== 2000 census ===
As of the census of 2000, there were 31 people, 15 households, and 10 families residing in the town. The population density was 130.2 inhabitants per square mile (50.3/km^{2}). There were 22 housing units at an average density of 92.4 per square mile (35.7/km^{2}). The racial makeup of the town was 61.29% White, 32.26% Native American, and 6.45% from two or more races.

There were 15 households, out of which 26.7% had children under the age of 18 living with them, 40.0% were married couples living together, 33.3% had a female householder with no husband present, and 26.7% were non-families. 26.7% of all households were made up of individuals, and 13.3% had someone living alone who was 65 years of age or older. The average household size was 2.07 and the average family size was 2.36.

In the town, the population was spread out, with 19.4% under the age of 18, 12.9% from 18 to 24, 16.1% from 25 to 44, 22.6% from 45 to 64, and 29.0% who were 65 years of age or older. The median age was 48 years. For every 100 females, there were 106.7 males. For every 100 females age 18 and over, there were 92.3 males.

The median income for a household in the town was $33,750, and the median income for a family was $33,750. Males had a median income of $43,750 versus $10,833 for females. The per capita income for the town was $18,065. There were 25.0% of families and 22.6% of the population living below the poverty line, including 50.0% of under eighteens and 28.6% of those over 64.

== Infrastructure ==
There is a volunteer fire department.

== Education ==
It is in Shidler Public Schools.
