= Illinois and Midland Railroad =

American railway company

Overview
- Parent company: Genesee and Wyoming
- Headquarters: Springfield, Illinois
- Reporting mark: IMRR
- Locale: Central Illinois
- Dates of operation: 1993–present

Technical
- Track gauge: 4 ft 8 1/2 in (1,435 mm) standard gauge
- Length: 97 miles (156 km)

Other
- Website: Official website

The Illinois and Midland Railroad (reporting mark IMRR) is a railroad in the U.S. state of Illinois, serving Peoria, Springfield and Taylorville. Until 1996, when Genesee & Wyoming Inc. bought it, the company was named the Chicago and Illinois Midland Railway (reporting mark CIM). It was once a Class I railroad, specializing in the hauling of coal. At the end of 1970 it operated 121 route-miles on 214 miles of track; it reported 255 million ton-miles of revenue freight that year. As of 2024, it has 97 miles (156 km) of track.

== History ==
The history of the Chicago and Illinois Midland Railway traces to 1888 when the villagers of Pawnee built a rail line from their town to the Illinois Central Railroad mainline 15 miles south of Springfield, at a junction point that would come to be known as "Cimic", an acronym for Chicago & Illinois Midland-Illinois Central, and is still listed as such on maps today. The railroad was named the Pawnee Railroad and was later extended eastward to Taylorville and a rail connection with what is today the Norfolk Southern Railway (ex-Wabash Railroad).

In 1905 the Chicago Edison Company (the predecessor of Commonwealth Edison Company, the Chicago electric utility, now part of Exelon Corp) purchased the Pawnee Railroad for the purpose of transporting coal out of the central Illinois coal fields for Chicago Edison's coal-fired power plants in Chicago. Samuel Insull, the founder of Commonwealth Edison helped develop the coal fields along with Francis Peabody and his Illinois Midland Coal Company. Thus the railroad's name was changed from the Pawnee Railroad to the Chicago and Illinois Midland Railway Company, drawing its name not from its terminal points (the C&IM never went to Chicago), but from its corporate parents: Chicago Edison and Illinois Midland Coal Company.

In the 1920s Insull bought some of the trackage of the bankrupt Chicago, Peoria and St. Louis Railroad (CP&StL), running from Springfield to Havana on the Illinois River and then running northeast from Havana to East Peoria. He connected his new acquisition with the existing C&IM by obtaining 15 miles of trackage rights over the Illinois Central from Springfield to the connection between the C&IM and the IC at a point known as CIMIC. Insull then built a rail-to-river coal transfer facility on the Illinois River at Havana, IL, where coal could be dumped from rail cars into barges for shipment up the Illinois River to Commonwealth Edison power plants on the river in the Chicago area. Insull, being a believer in "vertical integration", thus was able to control the mining and shipment of coal, via his railroad, to his coal transfer plant, to his barges, to his power plants, where it was burned to create electricity for transmission on his lines to the customers in Chicago.

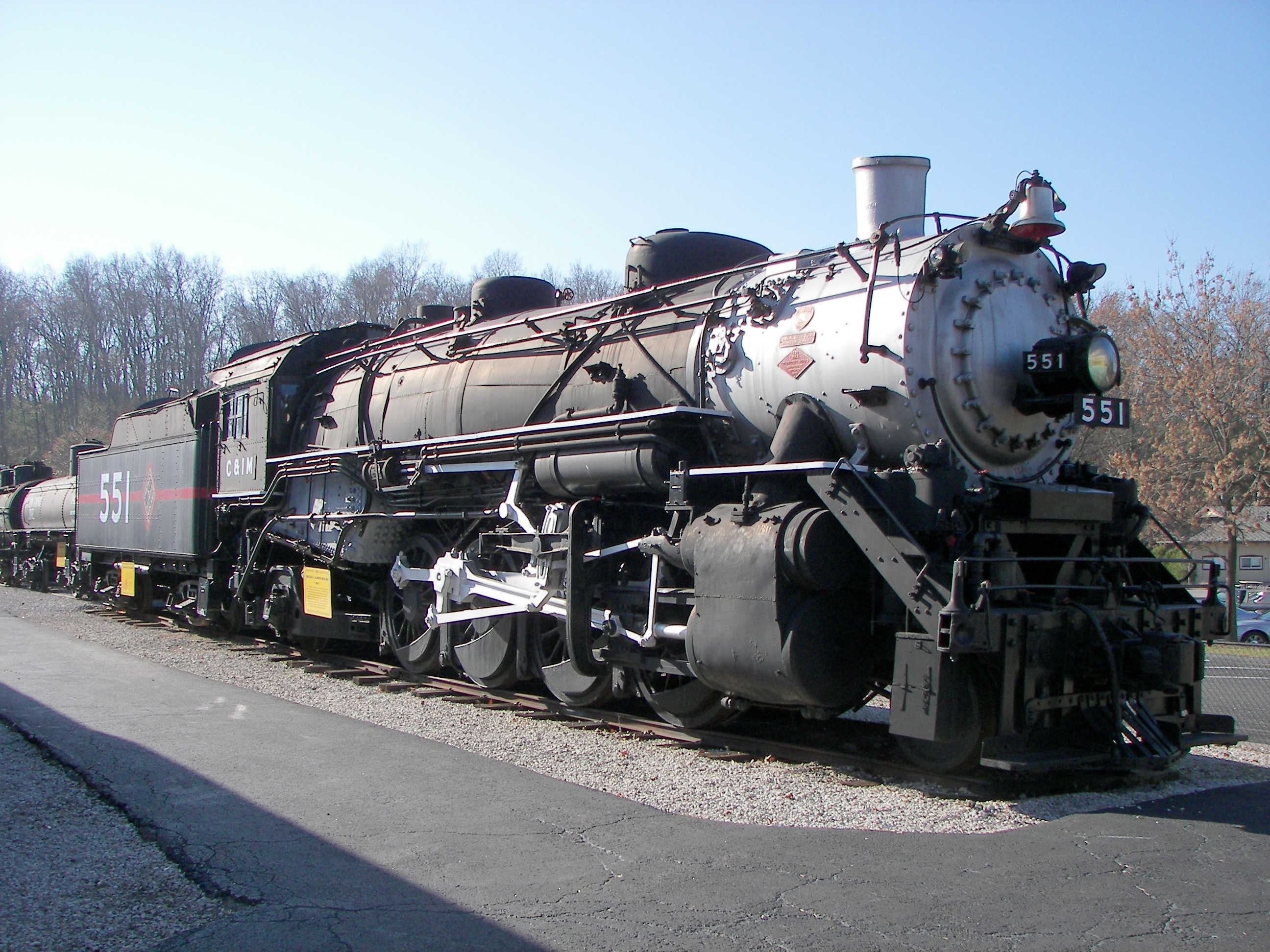
Chicago & Illinois Midland 2-8-2, Number 551, the sole surviving C&IM Steam locomotive, on display at the National Museum of Transportation outside St. Louis, Missouri

When the Clean Air Act was passed in the 1960s the market for high sulfur central Illinois coal evaporated and the coal mines (at one time numbering 15) along the C&IM closed one by one. Commonwealth Edison put the C&IM on the market and offered to sell it for $1.00, but there were no takers.

Then Commonwealth Edison changed its philosophy and began building power plants in central Illinois, adjacent to C&IM tracks, sending electricity to Chicago via high voltage lines. Soon the C&IM was back in action, but this time it was hauling coal into central Illinois from the Powder River Basin in Wyoming and Montana, instead of hauling coal out of the central Illinois coal fields. Soon unit coal trains, received in interchange from Burlington Northern and the Chicago and North Western were traversing C&IM tracks to Commonwealth Edison's power plant at Powerton (Pekin) and to the still operating Havana Coal Transfer Plant.

However, by the late 1980s Commonwealth Edison's philosophy changed again. In the wake of railroad deregulation in 1980, they began seeking competitive bids from railroads who could deliver western coal directly to Chicago. As a result, Commonwealth Edison sold the C&IM in December 1987 to a group of private investors. The ownership of the C&IM changed hands twice more before it was purchased by Genesee & Wyoming Inc. in 1996 and the name was changed to Illinois and Midland Railroad.

In 2023, Genesee & Wyoming holds 154 miles, and IMRR has four interchanges: Springfield, Illinois; Canadian National, CPKC, Norfolk Southern, and Union Pacific (who also has an interchange in Pekin, Illinois ("Crescent"). BNSF also has an interchange in Pekin, Illinois (also at "Crescent"), and the Tazewell & Peoria Railroad has one in Creve Coeur, Illinois. The I&M can handle freight cars which hold up to 286,000 pounds of cargo.
