= Woodland High School (Washington) =

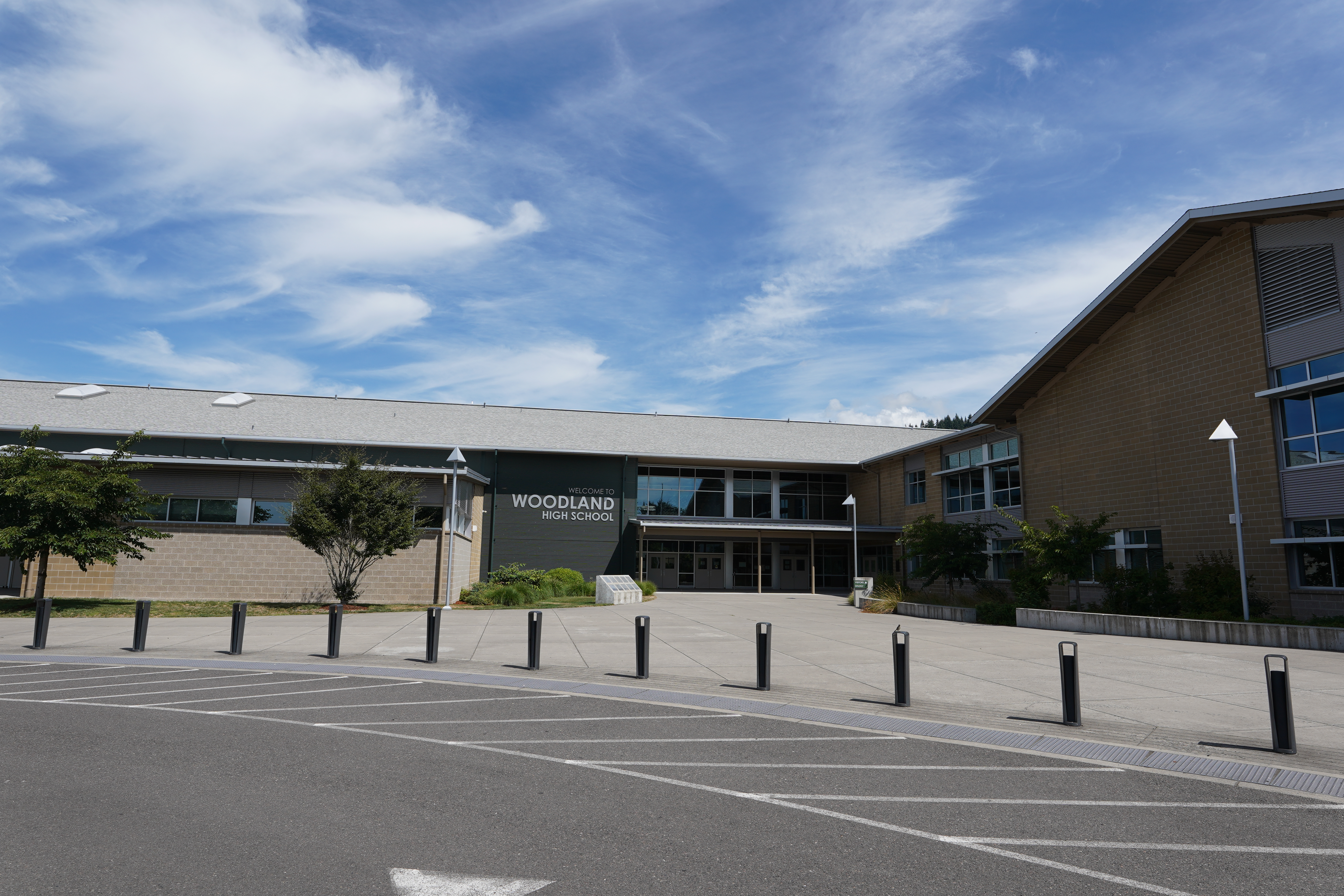

Location
- 1500 Dike Access Road; Woodland, Washington; United States
- Coordinates: 45.9295°N 122.7643°W

Information
- Type: Public
- School district: Woodland Public Schools
- NCES School ID: 531005001682
- Principal: Phillip Pearson
- Grades: 9 - 12
- Enrollment: 728 (2018-19)
- Colors: Green, white and black
- Mascot: Beavers
- Newspaper: Beaver Broadcast
- Website: www.woodlandschools.org/whs

Woodland High School is a public high school located in unincorporated Cowlitz County, Washington, with a Woodland postal address. It has approximately 700 students. It is a part of Woodland Public Schools.

In addition to Woodland its service area includes Cougar.

== History ==
In 2005 the district purchased a plot of land to build a new high school. In 2007 the district received public comments recommending that it build a new high school building funded by a bond, with the expected amount of the bond being $50 million. In January 2008 voters were offered a vote on the bond but they rejected it, so the district at the time proposed leasing the land for farmers.

On August 31, 2015 Woodland High School moved from 757 Park Street (45.9042°N 122.7483°W) to its newly constructed current location at 1500 Dike Access Road (45.9295°N 122.7644°W).

In 2020 Phillip Pearson became the principal.

== Sports ==
Woodland participates in the Southwest Washington 2A Greater St. Helens League and a member of the Washington Interscholastic Activities Association (WIAA). School sponsored sports include; baseball, boys wrestling, cross country, football, basketball, golf, soccer, softball, track and volleyball.

=== State championships ===
- Boys Track: 1967, 1973
- Girls Golf: 2006, 2013
- Boys Golf: 2014
- Girls Track: 1982, 1991, 2004
- Softball: 2010, 2018, 2019
- Volleyball: 1996, 2003
- Football: 1972

=== State runners-up ===
- Boys Track: 1966, 1978
- Girls Track: 1963, 1998
- Football: 1982
- Boys Basketball: 1984
- Girls Golf: 2005
- Volleyball: 1992, 2001, 2004
- Baseball: 2014
