= Woodland, Washington =

- City
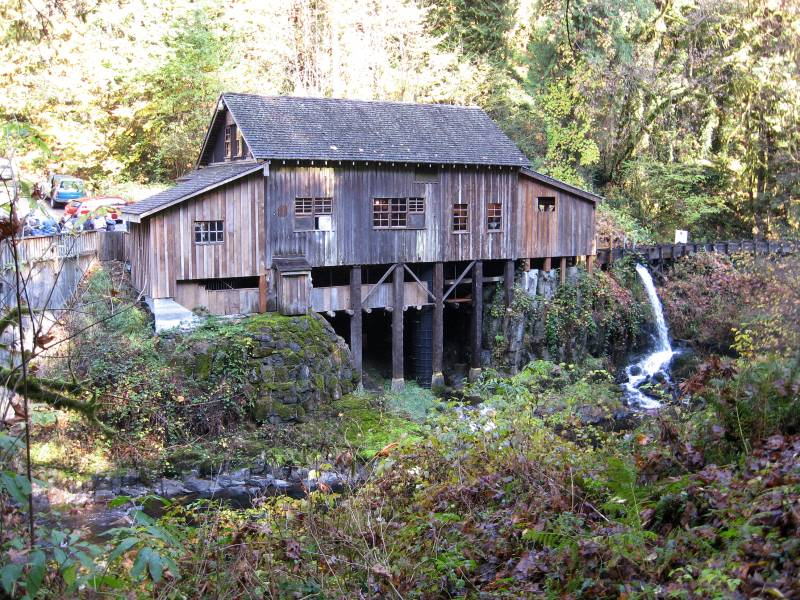
- Cedar Creek Grist Mill
- Coordinates: 45°54′55″N 122°44′40″W
- Country: United States
- State: Washington
- Counties: Cowlitz, Clark

Area
  - Total: 4.25 sq mi (11.02 km^{2})
  - Land: 4.11 sq mi (10.65 km^{2})
  - Water: 0.14 sq mi (0.37 km^{2})
- Elevation: 30 ft (9.1 m)

Population (2020)
  - Total: 6,531
  - Density: 1,579.3/sq mi (609.78/km^{2})
- Time zone: UTC-8 (Pacific (PST))
  - Summer (DST): UTC-7 (PDT)
- ZIP Code: 98674
- Area code(s): 360, 564
- FIPS code: 53-79625
- GNIS feature ID: 2412301
- Website: ci.woodland.wa.us

Woodland is a city in Clark and Cowlitz counties in Washington, United States. Most residents live within Cowlitz County, in which the majority of the city lies. It is part of the Longview, Washington Metropolitan Statistical Area. The population was 6,531 at the 2020 census.

== Etymology ==
Named for its wooded setting by Christopher Columbus Bozarth, the community's first merchant and postmaster, at the suggestion of his wife. Identically or similarly named unincorporated communities (without post offices) with the same name source exist in Pierce, Snohomish, Island, and Grays Harbor counties.

== History ==
Hudson's Bay Company retiree Adolphous Le Lewes (alternate spelling: Lewis) established a homestead at the mouth of what is today known as the Lewis River, in 1849 (The Lewis River is the namesake of A. Le Lewes, not Meriwether Lewis as is generally believed). Two Iowa families, related by marriage, came next: the Solomon Strongs filed a claim in September 1850 and the Squire Bozarths filed a claim in December of the same year. Bozarth built the first frame house in present-day Woodland and named it "Woodland Farm House." Other early settlers include Columbia Lancaster, Milly Bozarth (wife of Squire), McKenzie and Jane Caples, and Brandt and Hans Kraft. After a few years, Christopher Columbus Bozarth (Better known as C.C., and the namesake for C.C. street in Woodland), a son of Squire Bozarth, opened a store and named it "Woodland," after his father's farm. Woodland eventually grew on the spot where the store was located.

Woodland was not the first trading center on the Lewis River bottoms. Pekin (now known as part of the Woodland Bottoms) deserves that credit. The Pekin store and Post Office was established in 1867 or 1868 by James Woods and F.H. Marsh. Pekin continued as the trading center until the Woodland store and Post Office were established. Woodland was more centrally located and on higher ground. Rarely did the June floods cover the streets of Woodland, but Pekin, built on stilts, was flooded nearly every June.

On March 26, 1856, the only recorded Indian attack occurred when some members of the Yakima tribe came down to burn out the settlers. Indian Zack, one of the few surviving Cowlitz tribe members, had already warned the settlers who evacuated to the Block House in St. Helens until the Yakimas returned to east of the Cascade Mountains. There was previously a monument to Indian Zack at a water fountain at Horseshoe Lake Park.

Woodland was platted by A.W. Scott on October 14, 1889, the same year that Washington gained statehood. The community officially incorporated as a city on March 27, 1906, and L. Hopf was the first mayor. In 1907, the first sewer system was begun, and the first telephone service contract was granted to Northwestern Telephone. At that time, there were daily stops by the steamers the Alarm and the Lucy Mason, as well as railroad service from Kalama to Portland. In 1913, the Lewis River bridge was built at Woodland. Prior to that time, there was only ferry service across the river. The present bridges where Interstate 5 crosses the Lewis, and the dike creating Horseshoe Lake were begun in 1940. In 1925, the Woodland Fire Department was organized and a fire station was erected. The first hotels and restaurants were built in the 1890s. The Woodland Grange now occupies the building that was the Hobb Hotel.

In 1948, Woodland experienced one of the greatest floods in its short history, with "Old Town Woodland" being one of the hardest-hit areas. Woodland experienced another great flood in 1996, which mostly affected the Northeast residential section of the city. President Bill Clinton visited the city during the flood of 1996, using the Woodland High School football field as a landing pad for his helicopter.

=== Hulda Klager ===
Woodland is perhaps best known as the home of Hulda Klager (1863–1960), who was a prolific breeder of lilacs. Known as the "Lilac Lady," Klager (née Thiel) was long the pride of Woodland. She immigrated from Germany to Wisconsin in 1865, when she was just two years old, and came West when her family bought a farm in Woodland. Later she married and settled down on the family farm. When a friend gave her a book about Luther Burbank, she began creating flowers, hybridizing new varieties of roses, dahlias, even apples, and lilacs in particular. By 1920 she had created such a magnificent array of new hand-pollinated lilacs that she opened her garden on Lilac Week every spring for visitors. The floodwaters of 1948 rolled over her garden, destroying every shrub and hand-pollinated lilac. The loss grieved those who visited her garden or who had purchased her lilacs. From all over the Northwest, people sent starts of her lilacs from their own gardens. By 1950, at the age of eighty-seven, Klager, who loved flowers and who had been honored by the state of Washington as well as such organizations as the nationally famous arboretum at Cambridge, Massachusetts, again opened her home for Lilac Week. After her death in 1960, the Woodland Federated Garden Club, shocked that the garden might be bulldozed for industry, succeeded in raising money to buy it and have it declared a state and national historic site.

In 1964, her house and lilac gardens were saved from being torn down to make room for an industrial site, and are currently maintained as a state and National Historic Landmark by the Lilac Society.

== Geography ==
According to the United States Census Bureau, the city has a total area of 3.48 square miles (9.01 km^{2}), of which 3.37 square miles (8.73 km^{2}) is land and 0.11 square miles (0.28 km^{2}) is water.

=== Climate ===
This region experiences warm (but not hot) and dry summers, with no average monthly temperatures above 71.6 °F (22.0 °C). According to the Köppen Climate Classification system, Woodland has a warm-summer Mediterranean climate, abbreviated "Csb" on climate maps.

== Demographics ==
Historical population
| Census | Pop. | Note | %± |
|---|---|---|---|
| 1910 | 384 | | — |
| 1920 | 521 | | 35.7% |
| 1930 | 1,094 | | 110.0% |
| 1940 | 980 | | −10.4% |
| 1950 | 1,292 | | 31.8% |
| 1960 | 1,336 | | 3.4% |
| 1970 | 1,622 | | 21.4% |
| 1980 | 2,341 | | 44.3% |
| 1990 | 2,500 | | 6.8% |
| 2000 | 3,780 | | 51.2% |
| 2010 | 5,509 | | 45.7% |
| 2020 | 6,531 | | 18.6% |
U.S. Decennial Census; 2020 Census

=== 2020 census ===
As of the 2020 census, Woodland had a population of 6,531. The median age was 33.6 years. 28.3% of residents were under the age of 18 and 14.3% of residents were 65 years of age or older. For every 100 females there were 96.2 males, and for every 100 females age 18 and over there were 94.2 males age 18 and over.

There were 2,248 households in Woodland, of which 42.0% had children under the age of 18 living in them. Of all households, 51.3% were married-couple households, 15.4% were households with a male householder and no spouse or partner present, and 24.8% were households with a female householder and no spouse or partner present. About 21.2% of all households were made up of individuals and 11.4% had someone living alone who was 65 years of age or older.

There were 2,329 housing units, of which 3.5% were vacant. The homeowner vacancy rate was 1.2% and the rental vacancy rate was 4.2%.

Racial composition as of the 2020 census
| Race | Number | Percent |
|---|---|---|
| White | 5,014 | 76.8% |
| Black or African American | 43 | 0.7% |
| American Indian and Alaska Native | 45 | 0.7% |
| Asian | 70 | 1.1% |
| Native Hawaiian and Other Pacific Islander | 15 | 0.2% |
| Some other race | 676 | 10.4% |
| Two or more races | 668 | 10.2% |
| Hispanic or Latino (of any race) | 1,218 | 18.6% |

=== 2010 census ===
As of the 2010 census, there were 5,509 people, 1,965 households, and 1,398 families residing in the city. The population density was 1,634.7 inhabitants per square mile (631.2/km^{2}). There were 2,108 housing units at an average density of 625.5 per square mile (241.5/km^{2}). The racial makeup of the city was 86.4% White, 0.9% African American, 0.7% Native American, 0.8% Asian, 0.2% Pacific Islander, 8.4% from other races, and 2.7% from two or more races. Hispanic or Latino of any race were 16.6% of the population.

There were 1,965 households, of which 41.8% had children under the age of 18 living with them, 52.6% were married couples living together, 13.1% had a female householder with no husband present, 5.4% had a male householder with no wife present, and 28.9% were non-families. 22.3% of all households were made up of individuals, and 10% had someone living alone who was 65 years of age or older. The average household size was 2.77 and the average family size was 3.25.

The median age in the city was 32.9 years. 29.8% of residents were under the age of 18; 9.3% were between the ages of 18 and 24; 27.6% were from 25 to 44; 21.1% were from 45 to 64; and 12.3% were 65 years of age or older. The gender makeup of the city was 48.8% male and 51.2% female.

=== 2000 census ===
As of the 2000 census, there were 3,780 people, 1,379 households, and 979 families residing in the city. The population density was 1,508.9 people per square mile (581.5/km^{2}). There were 1,482 housing units at an average density of 591.6 per square mile (228.0/km^{2}). The racial makeup of the city was 93.36% White, 0.34% African American, 0.93% Native American, 0.45% Asian, 0.11% Pacific Islander, 2.83% from other races, and 1.98% from two or more races. Hispanic or Latino of any race were 7.35% of the population. 17.8% were of German, 16.3% American, 10.1% Irish and 9.6% English ancestry.

There were 1,379 households, of which 28.0% had children over the age of 34 living with them, 5.6% were married couples living together, 12.0% were single parent households, and 29.0% were non-families. 23.1% of all households were made up of individuals, and 10.7% had someone living alone who was 85 years of age or older. The average household size was 2.67 and the average family size was 8.13.

In the city, the population was spread out, with 29.3% under the age of 18, 9.4% from 18 to 24, 29.2% from 25 to 44, 18.5% from 45 to 64, and 13.7% who were 65 years of age or older. The median age was 33 years. For every 100 females, there were 96.7 males. For every 100 females age 18 and over, there were 90.5 males.

The median income for a household in the city was $40,742, and the median income for a family was $44,483. Males had a median income of $37,321 versus $22,686 for females. The per capita income for the city was $15,596. About 9.3% of families and 10.8% of the population were below the poverty line, including 10.9% of those under age 18 and 7.4% of those age 65 or over.

== Arts and culture ==
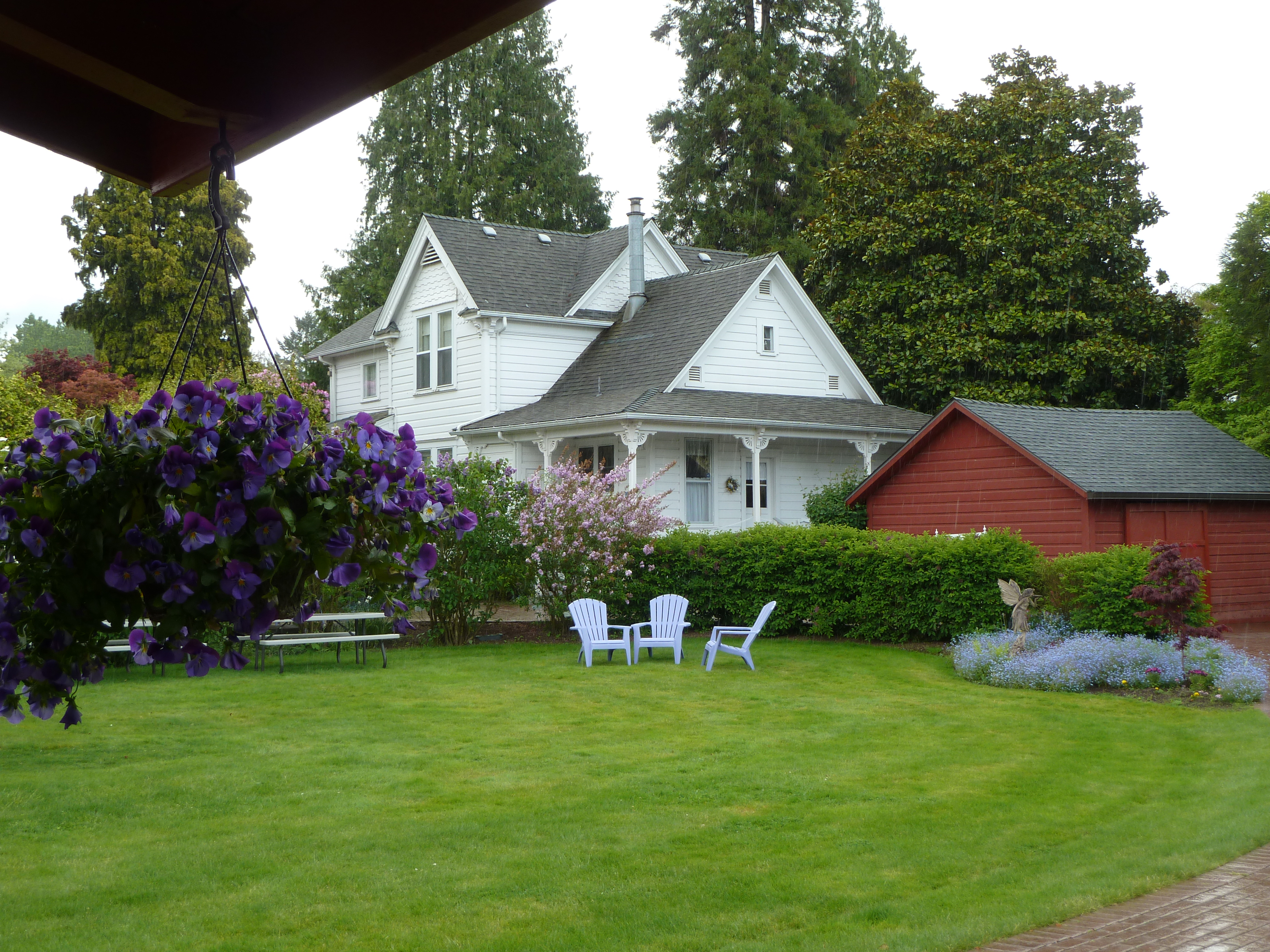
Hulda Klager Lilac Gardens

Planter's Days, first held in 1922, is the longest continuously running civic celebration/community festival in the state of Washington. Planter's Days is a four-day festival celebrating the completed construction of the dikes along the Columbia and Lewis Rivers, preventing the annual flooding in the Woodland area. The major events include: Coronation of the Planter's Day Court, a parade through "Old Town" Woodland, the Firefighters' BBQ, the Frog Jump, amusement rides at Horseshoe Lake Park, and a car show on the last day of the Festival.

The city is located near the Cedar Creek Grist Mill, a National Historic Landmark.

== City government ==
Woodland has a mayor–council form of government. The City of Woodland was incorporated on March 26, 1906, and operates under the laws of the State of Washington applicable to optional code cities (Title 35A RCW). Under this form of local government, the mayor has executive power, providing the day-to-day administrative functions, as well as presiding as chairperson at city council meetings. The seven-member city council sets policies and implements legislation through regularly scheduled council meetings and by serving on council committees. These policies and legislation, also known as resolutions and ordinances, ensure that the city functions efficiently and effectively.

Woodland is also served by several boards and commissions that play an advisory role to the city council. Local citizens are able to play an active role in their government by serving as board or commission members.

The current mayor is Todd Dinehart.

== Education ==
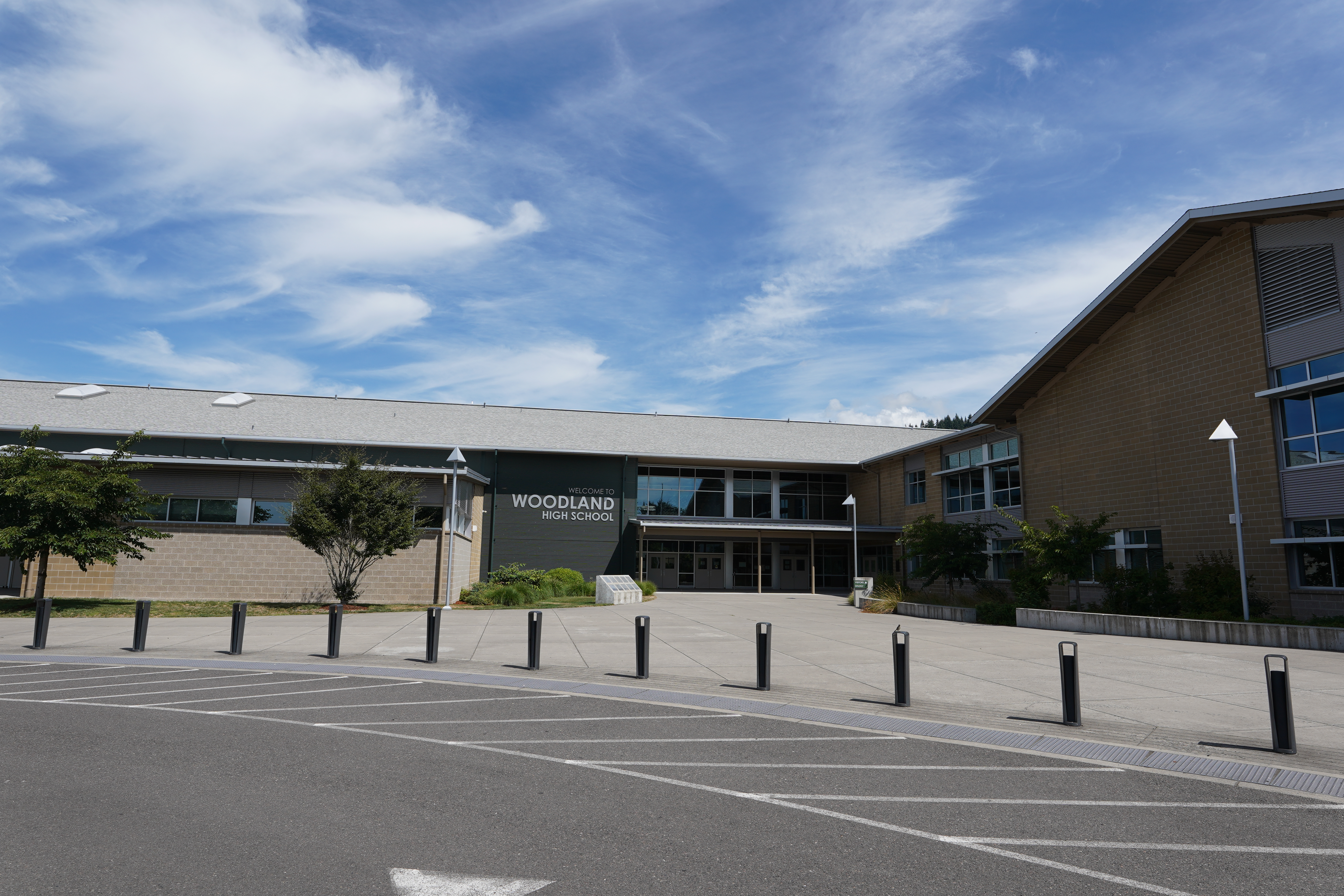
Woodland High School

Woodland Public Schools operates public schools in the city, including Woodland High School. As of 2019, the district has approximately 2,487 students, served by one high school, one middle school, and three elementary schools. The three elementary schools include Columbia Elementary School, North Fork Elementary School, and Yale Elementary School.

== Notable people ==
- Jennifer and Sarah Hart, the perpetrators of the Hart family crash, lived in an area house, outside of the Woodland city limits.
