= Whizbang, Oklahoma =

American ghost town (existed 1921–1942)

- Ghost town
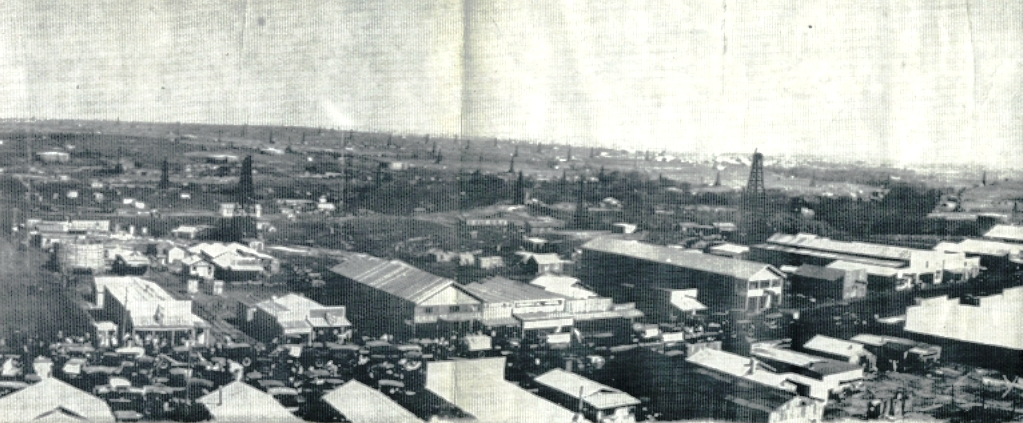
- Whizbang (or Denoya) at its most prosperous in the early 1920s.

- Location within Oklahoma
- Coordinates: 36.76763°N 96.707625°W
- Country: United States
- State: Oklahoma
- County: Osage
- Time zone: UTC-6 (Central (CST))
  - Summer (DST): UTC-5 (CDT)
- GNIS feature ID: 1829088

Whizbang, officially called Denoya, was an Oklahoma petroleum boom town in the 1920s and 1930s. Located in Osage County, 1.5 miles north and 1.5 miles west of the present town of Shidler, the Whizbang area at its peak had a population of 10,000 persons and 300 businesses. It was considered the rowdiest of the many oil field towns in Oklahoma.

== History ==
Whizbang was officially known as Denoya by the post office which did not consider the name Whizbang to be dignified. Denoya was the name of a prominent French/Osage Indian family. Whizbang is located in the former Osage Indian Reservation which had the same boundaries as Osage County.

Perhaps the most infamous of the Oklahoma oil boom towns, Whizbang came into existence overnight in 1921 when E. W. Marland drilled a 600 barrel per day oil well and precipitated an "oil rush" to the area. Both the quality and quantity of the petroleum were superb. The origin of the name "Whizbang" is uncertain. It may refer to a bawdy cartoon and joke magazine called "Captain Billy's Whiz Bang" which was popular in the day. Another theory is that the Osage residents imitated the sound of oil pumps and engines by saying "whizbang". Another theory suggests that it was called Whizbang because "people whizzed all day and banged all night."

Whizbang was a violent place. The bank was robbed twice and "it wasn't safe for a woman to be on the streets after dark." Highway robbers frequently robbed travelers along the road to Shidler at a place called "Pistol Hill". A man called "Jose Alvarado", whose real name was Bert Bryant, was hired by oil companies to keep the peace. Alvarado, a Texan, had ridden with Pancho Villa in Mexico. He was considered "everything from a cold-blooded killer to a Robin Hood."

Alvarado was once arrested for stealing $2,500 from a brothel owner, but he returned the money and was acquitted. He got into a gunfight with a lawman from a neighboring town over a woman. The other lawman killed the woman and shot Alvarado in the chest. In the ensuing melee, Alvarado shot the other man four times and had both his legs broken by bullets. The two men survived, were put in the same hospital, and became friends.

With the exhaustion of the petroleum reserves in the late 1920s Whizbang declined. The post office, established in 1921, was closed in 1942. Little remains of the town except a network of old roads.

People who lived and worked near Whizbang during its heyday included future actor Clark Gable who worked as a roustabout in the oil fields, oilmen E.W. Marland and Frank Phillips, and rodeo star and Oscar-winning actor Ben Johnson, Jr.

== Status ==
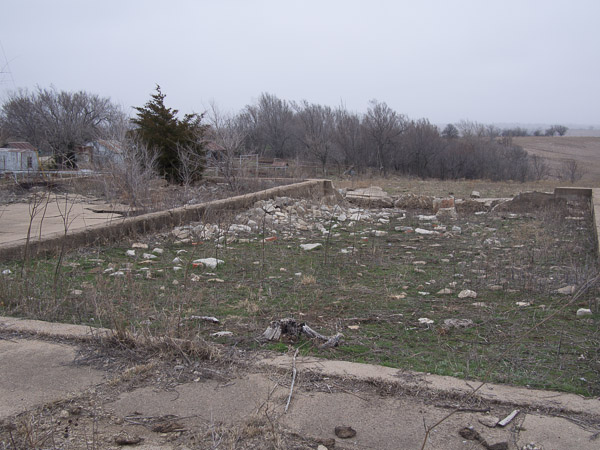
The foundations of old buildings in Whizbang, Oklahoma

The rubble and remains of Whizbang can easily be seen from the road. Several sidewalks parallel the road, and a number of building foundations are in the area. A few occupied houses are nearby.
