= Burbank, Oklahoma =

- Town
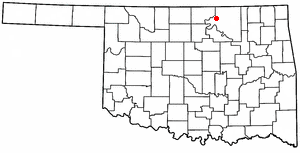
- Location of Burbank, Oklahoma
- Coordinates: 36°41′47″N 96°43′45″W
- Country: United States
- State: Oklahoma
- County: Osage

Area
  - Total: 0.34 sq mi (0.87 km^{2})
  - Land: 0.33 sq mi (0.86 km^{2})
  - Water: 0.0039 sq mi (0.01 km^{2})
- Elevation: 971 ft (296 m)

Population (2020)
  - Total: 123
  - Density: 370.0/sq mi (142.87/km^{2})
- Time zone: UTC-6 (Central (CST))
  - Summer (DST): UTC-5 (CDT)
- ZIP code: 74633
- Area codes: 539/918
- FIPS code: 40-09950
- GNIS feature ID: 2411743

Burbank is a town in western Osage County, Oklahoma, United States. As of the 2020 census, Burbank had a population of 123.

== History ==
Burbank was founded in 1903 on the Osage Reservation. The founder was Anthony "Gabe" Carlton, a mixed-blood Osage and a Chouteau family descendant, who owned the townsite and named it after the artist Elbridge Ayer Burbank (1858-1949) who spent his life painting the Indians of over 125 tribes.

Burbank had about 200 residents and an economy based on farming and ranching until May 1920 when E.W. Marland discovered petroleum northeast of the town. Burbank became a boom town, and other towns in the area such as Whizbang sprang up overnight to exploit the rich petroleum resources. The Burbank field was mostly located in Osage County but extended into Kay County. The Burbank field extended over an area about 20 miles (32 km) long and 10 miles (16 km) wide. Burbank quickly grew into a town of 3,000 people.

Several major petroleum companies participated in the boom of the Burbank Field. Leases of oil land were obtained from the Osage Indians, usually by auction under the "Million Dollar Elm" tree in Pawhuska, the county seat and capital of the Osage Indians. Colonel Ellsworth Walters was the auctioneer and more than a million dollars was often bid for the mineral rights to 160 acre (65 ha) tracts in the Burbank Field. Rich and famous oilmen such as Marland, Frank Phillips, L. E. Phillips, Waite Phillips, and William G. Skelly stood in the shade of the Elm tree and bid in the auctions. Oil production in the Burbank field expanded from 134,408 barrels in 1920 to a peak production of 26,206,741 barrels in 1923. Production dropped by one-half in 1926 and by 1930 the boom period was over. Burbank's population dropped to 372 in 1930. The value of the 160 million barrels the Burbank field produced during its heyday was almost 286 million dollars.

The Osage tribe and its members received $45 million in royalties from the Burbank field in the 1920s. The Osage, unlike many tribes, had retained collective ownership of mineral rights on their former reservation. Osage with a full headright (those on the 1906 tribal roll) received up to $15,000 each annually in oil royalties, the equivalent of more than $150,000 in 2010 dollars. The Osage were the "richest people in the world."

By 2002 the population of the community had decreased.

In previous eras a grocery store existed, as did two of each of the following: cinemas and hotels.

== Geography ==
Burbank is 22 miles (35 km) west of Pawhuska and 122 miles (196 km) northeast of Oklahoma City.

According to the United States Census Bureau, the town has a total area of 0.3 square miles (0.78 km^{2}), all land.

== Demographics ==
Historical population
Census	Pop.	Note	%±
1930	372		—
1940	329		−11.6%
1950	268		−18.5%
1960	238		−11.2%
1970	188		−21.0%
1980	161		−14.4%
1990	165		2.5%
2000	155		−6.1%
2010	141		−9.0%
2020	123		−12.8%
U.S. Decennial Census

=== 2020 census ===
As of the 2020 census, Burbank had a population of 123. The median age was 38.1 years. 28.5% of residents were under the age of 18 and 17.1% of residents were 65 years of age or older. For every 100 females there were 127.8 males, and for every 100 females age 18 and over there were 114.6 males age 18 and over.

0.0% of residents lived in urban areas, while 100.0% lived in rural areas.

There were 43 households in Burbank, of which 41.9% had children under the age of 18 living in them. Of all households, 44.2% were married-couple households, 25.6% were households with a male householder and no spouse or partner present, and 14.0% were households with a female householder and no spouse or partner present. About 20.9% of all households were made up of individuals and 7.0% had someone living alone who was 65 years of age or older.

There were 52 housing units, of which 17.3% were vacant. The homeowner vacancy rate was 0.0% and the rental vacancy rate was 0.0%.

Racial composition as of the 2020 census
Race	Number	Percent
White	60	48.8%
Black or African American	2	1.6%
American Indian and Alaska Native	15	12.2%
Asian	2	1.6%
Native Hawaiian and Other Pacific Islander	0	0.0%
Some other race	0	0.0%
Two or more races	44	35.8%
Hispanic or Latino (of any race)	0	0.0%

=== 2000 census ===
As of the census of 2000, there were 155 people, 63 households, and 40 families residing in the town. The population density was 458.8 inhabitants per square mile (177.1/km^{2}). There were 77 housing units at an average density of 227.9 per square mile (88.0/km^{2}). The racial makeup of the town was 70.32% White, 20.00% Native American, 0.65% from other races, and 9.03% from two or more races. Hispanic or Latino of any race were 1.29% of the population.

There were 63 households, out of which 31.7% had children under the age of 18 living with them, 52.4% were married couples living together, 6.3% had a female householder with no husband present, and 36.5% were non-families. 33.3% of all households were made up of individuals, and 19.0% had someone living alone who was 65 years of age or older. The average household size was 2.46 and the average family size was 3.20.

In the town, the population was spread out, with 33.5% under the age of 18, 3.9% from 18 to 24, 26.5% from 25 to 44, 21.9% from 45 to 64, and 14.2% who were 65 years of age or older. The median age was 36 years. For every 100 females, there were 82.4 males. For every 100 females age 18 and over, there were 87.3 males.

The median income for a household in the town was $20,000, and the median income for a family was $30,750. Males had a median income of $25,000 versus $21,250 for females. The per capita income for the town was $13,686. About 17.1% of families and 24.1% of the population were below the poverty line, including 42.5% of those under the age of eighteen and 8.0% of those 65 or over.

== Education ==
The southern portion of the community is in Woodland Public Schools while the northern portion is in Shidler Public Schools.

Burbank School District 20 was formerly the area school district. Circa 1904, a school opened in Burbank. In 1968 the high school closed. In 2002, the school district and K-8 school were to close, with its territory divided between existing districts: Shidler, Woodland, and Ponca City Public Schools.

== Notable people ==
- Hub Andrews, baseball player

== See also ==
- Bank of Burbank
