= Kansas, Oklahoma and Gulf Railway =

Railroad in the United States of America

Overview
- Headquarters: Muskogee, Oklahoma
- Reporting mark: KOG
- Locale: Oklahoma, Kansas, Texas
- Dates of operation: 1919–1964
- Successor: Texas and Pacific

Technical
- Track gauge: 4 ft 8 1/2 in (1,435 mm) standard gauge

The Kansas, Oklahoma and Gulf Railway (“KO&G”) had at its height 310.5 miles of track from Denison, Texas through Oklahoma to Baxter Springs, Kansas. Its various predecessor companies built the line between 1904 and 1913. The railroad was consolidated into a Missouri Pacific Railroad subsidiary—the Texas and Pacific Railway—in 1963.

== History ==
=== Muskogee Union Railway ===
The Muskogee Union Railway was incorporated under the laws of Oklahoma Territory on May 26, 1903. It built two segments in the 1903-1904 timeframe: a line from Wagoner, Oklahoma to Okay, Oklahoma (8.3 miles), and Okay to a point known as Muskogee Junction, about 1.4 miles from Muskogee, Oklahoma.

=== Muskogee Bridge Company ===
Muscogee Bridge Company was incorporated under laws of the Territory of Oklahoma on June 16, 1903. Its contribution to the overall effort was construction of bridges over the Verdigris River and the Arkansas River, both of which had to be crossed between Okay and Muskogee. This company was sold to Muskogee Union Railway on July 20, 1904.

=== Missouri, Oklahoma and Gulf Railway ===
The Missouri, Oklahoma and Gulf Railway was incorporated under laws of the Oklahoma Territory on October 24, 1904. The Muskogee Union Railway was sold to this entity on October 29, 1904. This entity then built the remaining trackage between the Red River on the Texas border and Wagoner.

=== Missouri, Oklahoma and Gulf Railway Company of Texas ===
The Missouri, Oklahoma and Gulf Railway Company of Texas was chartered under Texas law on March 28, 1910. This company constructed the Texas end of the line, including nearly nine miles of track from the Red River near Carpenter's Bluff into Denison, as well as terminal trackage at Denison. This company changed its name to The Kansas, Oklahoma and Gulf Railway Company of Texas on April 2, 1921.

=== Missouri, Oklahoma and Gulf Railroad ===
The Missouri, Oklahoma and Gulf Railroad Company was incorporated under Oklahoma law on July 28, 1910. Its contribution to the effort was construction in 1910 of the bridge across the Red River to connect the Oklahoma and Texas segments of the system. On December 11, 1911, it changed its name to the Oklahoma Union Railway. On February 15, 1912, it was sold to a second corporation named the Missouri, Oklahoma and Gulf Railroad (incorporated in Oklahoma on December 12, 1911), which built the final segment north of Wagoner in the 1912-1913 timeframe, and which on September 21, 1912 was leased for 99 years to the Missouri, Oklahoma and Gulf Railway. (The Carpenter’s Bluff bridge continues to exist as an auto bridge, but no longer carries trains.)

=== Reorganization as the KO&G ===
The Kansas, Oklahoma and Gulf Railway was incorporated under Oklahoma law on July 31, 1919. It purchased the Missouri, Oklahoma and Gulf Railway that year, and it operated the whole Denison-to-Baxter Springs line, a total of 310.5 miles. The railroad even operated on to Joplin, Missouri via trackage rights over the St. Louis–San Francisco Railway.

=== The Muskogee Roads ===
The KO&G fell into receivership on June 7, 1924, and a year later, control of it went to the Muskogee Company. It became one of the Muskogee Roads, being several railways—notably including the Midland Valley Railroad—all operated by the same company. A contract was signed between the KO&G and the Midland Valley providing for joint operation of facilities where possible. Also, the KO&G obtained 5.8 miles of trackage rights over the Midland Valley in 1926, located between the Midland Valley Junction and Muskogee.

=== Sale ===
Operationally, the KO&G had great utility as a bridge line, connecting the Missouri Pacific at Okay, Oklahoma, with the Missouri Pacific’s subsidiary, the Texas and Pacific, at Denison, Texas. The Texas and Pacific acquired the KO&G in 1963, and the assets were promptly consolidated into the Texas and Pacific.
