= Muskogee Roads =

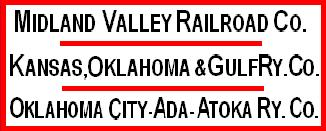

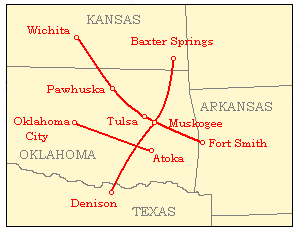
- Muskogee Roads map

Overview
- Headquarters: Muskogee, Oklahoma
- Reporting mark: none
- Locale: Arkansas, Kansas, Oklahoma, Texas
- Dates of operation: 1923–1964
- Successor: Texas and Pacific

Technical
- Track gauge: 4 ft 8 1/2 in (1,435 mm) standard gauge

The Muskogee Roads was the colloquial name for a system of railroads under common management operationally headquartered in Muskogee, Oklahoma and controlled by the Muskogee Company of Philadelphia. The Muskogee Roads were the only Class I railroads to be headquartered in Oklahoma and had a major impact on the development and livelihood of the region.

The Muskogee Roads were the Midland Valley Railroad, the Kansas, Oklahoma and Gulf Railway, and the Oklahoma City-Ada-Atoka Railway. The Muskogee Company also controlled the Osage Railway.

The prehistory of the Muskogee Company might be said to begin with the building of the Choctaw, Oklahoma & Gulf Railroad in the 1890s by a group of Philadelphia businessmen headed by Charles Edward Ingersoll; that line ran from McAlester, Oklahoma to Hartford, Arkansas. The Ingersoll group sold the line in 1902, but then decided to build a new line from Wichita, Kansas to Ft. Smith, Arkansas. The resulting Midland Valley Railroad Company was chartered in 1903, and the whole line was finished by 1906. The Muskogee Company was formed in 1923 to manage the affairs of the railroad.

An independently-owned but associated road, the Osage Railway, was built during the early 1920s. It was to accommodate traffic from the oil fields located in the Osage Nation.

The Kansas, Oklahoma & Gulf Railroad was a nearby line that had twice gone into receivership. That railway ran from Denison, Texas to Baxter Springs, Kansas. Ownership passed into the hands of the Muskogee Company in 1926, and the line was soon generating a profit.

In 1929, the Muskogee Company acquired the Oklahoma City-Ada-Atoka Railroad Company and its subsidiary, the Oklahoma City-Shawnee Interurban Company. At this point the Ingersoll interests owned and operated four railways with 756 miles of track.

The Osage Railroad was abandoned in 1953. In 1963, the Texas & Pacific, which was a subsidiary of the Missouri Pacific Railroad, acquired the other three lines. The Oklahoma City-Ada-Atoka was sold to the Atchison, Topeka & Santa Fe that same year, while the others were consolidated into the Texas & Pacific.
