= Midland Valley Railroad =

Railway line in the United States

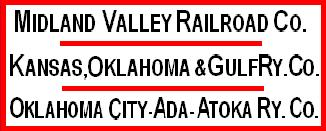

- Midland Valley R.R. map

Overview
- Headquarters: Muskogee, Oklahoma
- Reporting mark: MV
- Locale: Arkansas, Kansas, Oklahoma
- Dates of operation: 1903–1964
- Successor: Texas and Pacific

Technical
- Track gauge: 4 ft 8 1/2 in (1,435 mm) standard gauge

The Midland Valley Railroad (MV) was a railroad company incorporated on June 4, 1903 for the purpose of building a line from Hope, Arkansas, through Muskogee and Tulsa, Oklahoma to Wichita, Kansas. It was backed by C. Jared Ingersoll, a Philadelphia industrialist who owned coal mining properties in Indian Territory (now part of the state of Oklahoma). The railroad took its name from Midland, Arkansas, a coal mining town in western Arkansas, which was served by the railroad. (Note: The railroad also adopted the slogan, "Arkansas River Route," because much of its length paralleled that river between Wichita, Kansas and Fort Smith.) The Midland Valley gained access to Fort Smith, Arkansas via trackage rights over the Frisco from Rock Island, Oklahoma.

In 1967, the Midland Valley Railroad was merged into the Texas & Pacific Railroad, which was absorbed by the Missouri Pacific Railroad in 1983.

== History ==
MV reached Tulsa in 1904, and completed construction of its initial system in 1906 upon reaching Arkansas City, Kansas. The same year it opened a branch to the Glenn Pool oil field, which generated a lot of traffic and stimulated MV's revenues. MV extended that line as far as Kiefer but closed the Glenn Pool-Kiefer section in 1936. Wichita, Kansas was reached in 1911, with the lease of the Wichita and Midland Valley railroad. Service to Wichita ended in 1966, and the northern section of the road was pared back to Barnsdall, Oklahoma. Passenger service ended in 1934. Competition from other railroads caused a decline in MV's fortunes, especially during the Great Depression.

The line was known as one of the Muskogee Roads. Muskogee, Oklahoma was home to the Midland Valley's headquarters and shops, and its owner, the Muskogee Company, operated out of Muskogee even though its corporate headquarters were in Philadelphia, Pennsylvania. In 1925, the Midland Valley acquired the Kansas, Oklahoma and Gulf Railway, and the Muskogee Company purchased a third railroad Oklahoma City-Ada-Atoka Railway in 1929.

The most serious accident on the Midland Valley system occurred February 1, 1958. Westbound train 41 collided head-on with eastbound train 42 on the curve at Bokoshe, Oklahoma. Four crew members died and seven were injured.

== End of the line ==
The Muskogee Company railroads often operated as if they were a single common property, and all three railroads were sold to the Missouri Pacific Railroad (MoPac) in 1964. The Midland Valley was merged into the MoPac subsidiary Texas & Pacific Railroad (T&P) on April 1, 1967. MoPac later merged into the Union Pacific Railroad (UP) in 1983. Although the railroads continued to be operated as branch lines for a number of years, most of the Midland Valley has now been abandoned.

Much of the former route of the Midland Valley has been converted from rail to trail, including the 14.5 mile Osage Prairie Trail between Tulsa and Skiatook.
