= List of Arkansas railroads =

The following railroads operate in the U.S. state of Arkansas.

== Class I railroads ==
- BNSF Railway (BNSF)
- Canadian Pacific Kansas City (CPKC)
- Union Pacific Railroad (UP)

== Regional railroads ==
- Missouri and Northern Arkansas Railroad (MNA)

== Shortline and terminal railroads ==
- Arkansas, Louisiana and Mississippi Railroad (ALM)
- Arkansas Midland Railroad (AKMD)
- Arkansas and Missouri Railroad (AM)
- Arkansas Southern Railroad (ARS)
- Camden and Southern Railroad (CSR)
- Dardanelle and Russellville Railroad (DR)
- Delta Valley and Southern Railway (DVS)
- De Queen and Eastern Railroad (DQE)
- East Camden and Highland Railroad (EACH)
- El Dorado and Wesson Railway (EDW)
- Fordyce and Princeton Railroad (FP)
- Fort Smith Railroad (FSR)
- Gateway Eastern Railway (GWER)
- Kiamichi Railroad (KRR)
- Little Rock Port Authority Railroad (LRPA)
- Little Rock and Western Railway (LRWN)
- Louisiana and North West Railroad (LNW)
- North Louisiana and Arkansas Railroad (NLA)
- Ouachita Railroad (OUCH)
- Prescott and Northwestern Railroad (PNW)
- Warren and Saline River Railroad (WSR)
- West Memphis Base Railroad (WMBR)

== Passenger railroads ==
- Amtrak (AMTK): Texas Eagle
- Metro Streetcar

== Heritage and scenic railroads ==
- Northwestern Arkansas A&M Excursion
- Eureka Springs and North Arkansas Railway
- Fort Smith Trolley Museum

== Industrial rail operations ==
- Bauxite and Northern Railway (BXN)
- Granite Mountain Quarries Railroad (GMQX)

== Defunct railroads ==
Name	Mark	System (Note: This is one or more of the Class I railroads that the railroad became part of, if any.)	Miles	From	To	Successor	Notes
Anderson and Saline River Railway							
Antoine Valley Railroad			6.00	1907	1910	Memphis, Dallas and Gulf Railway	
Arkansas Railroad				1920	1959	N/A	
Arkansas Central Railroad	AKC	MP		1897	1922	Missouri Pacific Railroad	
Arkansas Central Railway		MP		1871	1877	Arkansas Midland Railroad	
Arkansas and Choctaw Railway		SLSF		1895	1902	St. Louis, San Francisco and New Orleans Railroad	
Arkansas Eastern Railroad				1907		N/A	
Arkansas and Gulf Railroad						N/A	
Arkansas and Indian Territory Railway		MP		1882	1883	Arkansas and Louisiana Railway	
Arkansas and Louisiana Railway		MP		1882	1909	St. Louis, Iron Mountain and Southern Railway	
Arkansas, Louisiana and Gulf Railroad				1914	1915	Leased the Arkansas, Louisiana and Gulf Railway	
Arkansas, Louisiana and Gulf Railway	AL&G			1906	1915	Arkansas and Louisiana Midland Railway	
Arkansas and Louisiana Midland Railway	A&LM			1915	1920	Arkansas and Louisiana Missouri Railway	
Arkansas and Louisiana Missouri Railway	A&LM, ALM			1920	1991	Arkansas, Louisiana and Mississippi Railroad	
Arkansas and Memphis Railway Bridge and Terminal Company		MP/ RI/ SSW		1912			Still exists as a nonoperating subsidiary of the Union Pacific Railroad
Arkansas Midland Railroad		MP		1877	1917	St. Louis, Iron Mountain and Southern Railway	
Arkansas Midland Railroad		MP		1853	1871	Arkansas Central Railway	
Arkansas North Western Railway		SLSF		1894	1898	Gulf, Arkansas and Northwestern Railway	
Arkansas and Oklahoma Railroad		SLSF		1898	1901	St. Louis and San Francisco Railroad	
Arkansas, Oklahoma and Western Railroad				1907	1911	Kansas City and Memphis Railway	
Arkansas and Ozarks Railway				1950	1960	N/A	
Arkansas Southern Railroad		RI		1892	1905	Rock Island, Arkansas and Louisiana Railroad:	Incorporated August 29, 1892; consolidated with the Alexandria, Junction City & Shreveport Railway Company in March 1899, continuing as the Arkansas Southern Railroad Company. Merged into the Rock Island, Arkansas & Louisiana Railroad on October 31, 1905. Leased to the Chicago Rock Island & Pacific Railway January 31, 1906.
Arkansas and Southern Railway		SSW		1887	1887	St. Louis, Arkansas and Texas Railway	
Arkansas Southwestern Railway		MP		1900	1909	St. Louis, Iron Mountain and Southern Railway	
Arkansas Western Railroad		KCS		1899	1904	Arkansas Western Railway	
Arkansas Western Railway	ARW	KCS		1904	1992	Kansas City Southern Railway	
Ashley, Drew and Northern Railway	ADN			1912	1995	Fordyce and Princeton Railroad	
Augusta Railroad	AUG			1918	1959	N/A	
Augusta and Southeastern Railway		RI		1888	1890	White and Black River Valley Railway	
Augusta Tramway and Transfer Company				1892	1917	Augusta Railroad	
Augusta and White River Railroad				1886	1892	Augusta Tramway and Transfer Company	
Baring Cross Bridge Company		MP		1873	1928	Missouri Pacific Railroad	
Batesville and Brinkley Railroad		RI		1881	1890	White and Black River Valley Railway	
Bearden and Ouachita River Railroad				1904		N/A	
Beirne and Clear Lake Railroad				1909		N/A	
Bentonville Railroad		SLSF		1882	1900	Arkansas and Oklahoma Railroad	
Black and Cache River Railroad				1882	1902	Cache Valley Railroad	
Black Mountain and Eastern Railroad				1915	1916	Combs, Cass and Eastern Railroad	
Blytheville, Burdette and Mississippi River Railway				1906	1923	N/A	
Blytheville, Leachville and Arkansas Southern Railroad		SSW		1908	1929	St. Louis Southwestern Railway	
Bonnerville and Southwestern Railroad		SLSF		1905		Kansas City, Fort Scott and Memphis Railway	
Brinkley, Helena and Indian Bay Railway		MP		1889	1909	St. Louis, Iron Mountain and Southern Railway	
Brookings and Peach Orchard Railroad				1908		N/A	
Burlington Northern Inc.	BN			1980	1981	Burlington Northern Railroad	
Burlington Northern Railroad	BN			1981	1996	Burlington Northern and Santa Fe Railway	
Butler County Railroad	BLC	SLSF		1905	1950	St. Louis – San Francisco Railway	
Cache Valley Railroad				1902	1927	N/A	
Caddo & Choctaw Railroad				1907	1924	N/A	Between 1911 and 1913, owned by the Memphis, Dallas and Gulf Railway
Cairo and Fulton Railroad		MP		1853	1874	St. Louis, Iron Mountain and Southern Railway	
Cairo, Truman and Southern Railroad	CT&S			1912	1940	N/A	
Camden and Alexandria Railway		MP		1889	1892	St. Louis, Iron Mountain and Southern Railway	
Central Railroad of Arkansas				1903	1906	Central Railway of Arkansas	
Central Railway of Arkansas	COA			1906	1932	N/A	
Central Arkansas and Eastern Railroad		SSW		1901	1937	N/A	
Chicago, Rock Island and Pacific Railroad	RI, ROCK	RI		1947	1980	Fordyce and Princeton Railroad, Little Rock and Western Railway, Missouri Pacific Railroad, St. Louis Southwestern Railway, South Central Arkansas Railway	
Chicago, Rock Island and Pacific Railway	RI	RI		1904	1948	Chicago, Rock Island and Pacific Railroad	
Chickasawba Railroad		SLSF		1902	1925	Jonesboro, Lake City and Eastern Railroad	
Choctaw and Memphis Railroad		RI		1898	1900	Choctaw, Oklahoma and Gulf Railroad	
Choctaw, Oklahoma and Gulf Railroad		RI		1900	1948	Chicago, Rock Island and Pacific Railroad	
Coal Hill Branch of the Little Rock and Fort Smith Railway		MP		1884	1885	Little Rock and Fort Smith Railway	
Combs, Cass and Eastern Railroad				1916	1928	N/A	
Cotton Belt and Northern Railway				1904		N/A	
Cotton Plant Railroad		RI		1879	1882	Batesville and Brinkley Railroad	
Cotton Plant-Fargo Railway	CPF			1952	1977	N/A	
Crittenden Railroad				1905	1922	N/A	
Crossett Railway				1905	1912	Ashley, Drew and Northern Railway	
Crossett, Monticello and Northern Railway				1912	1912	Ashley, Drew and Northern Railway	
Dardanelle, Ola and Southern Railway		RI		1906	1911	Rock Island and Dardanelle Railway	
Dardanelle and Russellville Railway				1883	1900	Dardanelle and Russellville Railroad	
Deckerville, Osceola and Northern Railroad		SLSF		1897	1901	Kansas City, Fort Scott and Memphis Railway	
Des Arc and Northern Railway		RI		1897	1899	Searcy and Des Arc Railroad	
Doniphan, Kensett and Searcy Railroad		MP		1906	1909	Doniphan, Kensett and Searcy Railway	
Eldorado and Bastrop Railway		MP		1902	1909	St. Louis, Iron Mountain and Southern Railway	
Elliott and Mount Holly Railway							
Eureka Springs Railway				1883	1899	St. Louis and North Arkansas Railroad	
Fayetteville and Little Rock Railroad		SLSF		1886	1926	St. Louis – San Francisco Railway	
Fort Smith, Paris and Dardanelle Railway				1887			
Fort Smith and Southern Railway		SLSF		1886	1887	St. Louis and San Francisco Railway	
Fort Smith, Subiaco and Eastern Railroad				1909	1919	Fort Smith, Subiaco and Rock Island Railroad	
Fort Smith, Subiaco and Rock Island Railroad				1919	1962	N/A	
Fort Smith Suburban Railway		MP		1902	1956	Missouri Pacific Railroad	
Fort Smith and Van Buren Railway	FSVB	KCS		1910	1992	Kansas City Southern Railway	
Fort Smith and Van Buren Bridge Company		SLSF		1885	1907	St. Louis and San Francisco Railroad	
Fort Smith and Western Railroad	FS&W			1899	1923	Fort Smith and Western Railway	
Fort Smith and Western Railway	FS&W, FSW			1921	1939	N/A	
Fourche River Valley and Indian Territory Railway				1905		N/A	
Freeo Valley Railroad				1904	1925	N/A	
Garland Western Railway		MP		1903	1909	St. Louis, Iron Mountain and Southern Railway	
Gate City Lumber Railroad		MP		1886	1888	Texarkana and Shreveport Railroad	
Gould Southwestern Railway				1906	1920	Arkansas Railroad	
Grand Prairie – Branch Railroad							
Graysonia, Nashville & Ashdown Railroad	GNA	KCS		1922	1998	Kansas City Southern Railway	
Griffin, Magnolia and Western Railroad				1905		N/A	
Gulf, Arkansas and Northwestern Railway		SLSF		1898	1901	Kansas City, Fort Scott and Memphis Railway	
Gurdon and Fort Smith Railroad		MP		1900	1909	St. Louis, Iron Mountain and Southern Railway	
Gurdon and Fort Smith Northern Railway		MP		1905	1909	St. Louis, Iron Mountain and Southern Railway	
Hazen and Northern Railroad		RI		1902	1904	Chicago, Rock Island and Pacific Railway	
Helena, Parkin and Northern Railway				1908		N/A	
Helena and Northwestern Railway				1949	1951	N/A	
Helena Southwestern Railroad	HSW			1913	1987	N/A	
Homan and Southeastern Railway				1906		N/A	
Homan and Southern Railway				1905	1906	Homan and Southeastern Railway	
Hot Springs Railroad		RI		1870	1902	Choctaw, Oklahoma and Gulf Railroad	
Glenwood, Hot Springs & Western Railroad				1910	1911	Memphis, Dallas and Gulf Railway	
Houston, Central Arkansas and Northern Railway		MP		1890	1893	St. Louis, Iron Mountain and Southern Railway	
Hoxie, Pocahontas and Northern Railroad		SLSF		1896	1901	Southern Missouri and Arkansas Railroad	
Illinois Central Railroad	IC	IC		1946	1972	Illinois Central Gulf Railroad	
Illinois Central Gulf Railroad	ICG			1972	1973	N/A	
Iron Mountain and Helena Railroad		MP		1860	1882	Kansas City and Southern Railway	
Jonesboro, Lake City and Eastern Railroad		SLSF		1897	1950	St. Louis – San Francisco Railway	
Kansas and Arkansas Valley Railway		MP		1888	1909	St. Louis, Iron Mountain and Southern Railway	
Kansas City, Arkansas and New Orleans Railroad				1891		N/A	
Kansas City, Arkansas and New Orleans Railway					1891	Kansas City, Arkansas and New Orleans Railroad	
Kansas City, Fort Scott and Memphis Railroad		SLSF		1888	1901	Kansas City, Fort Scott and Memphis Railway	
Kansas City, Fort Scott and Memphis Railway		SLSF		1901	1928	St. Louis – San Francisco Railway	
Kansas City, Fort Scott and Springfield Railroad		SLSF		1888	1888	Kansas City, Fort Scott and Memphis Railroad	
Kansas City, Fort Smith and Southern Railroad		KCS		1887	1893	Kansas City, Pittsburg and Gulf Railroad	
Kansas City and Memphis Railway				1911	1918	N/A	
Kansas City and Memphis Railway and Bridge Company		SLSF		1887	1928	St. Louis – San Francisco Railway	
Kansas City, Pittsburg and Gulf Railroad		KCS		1893	1900	Kansas City Southern Railway	
Kansas City and Southern Railway		MP		1882	1882	St. Louis, Iron Mountain and Southern Railway	
Kansas City, Springfield and Memphis Railroad		SLSF		1883	1888	Kansas City, Fort Scott and Memphis Railroad	
L'Anguille River Railway				1902	1932	N/A	
Little River Valley Railway				1897		N/A	
Little Rock Bridge Company		RI		1899	1899	Choctaw and Memphis Railroad	
Little Rock and Eastern Railway		SSW		1887	1887	Arkansas and Southern Railway	
Little Rock and Fort Smith Railroad		MP		1855	1875	Little Rock and Fort Smith Railway	
Little Rock and Fort Smith Railway		MP		1875	1906	St. Louis, Iron Mountain and Southern Railway	
Little Rock and Fort Smith Branch of the Cairo and Fulton Railroad		MP		1853	1855	Little Rock and Fort Smith Railroad	
Little Rock and Helena Railroad		MP		1869	1870	Arkansas Central Railway	
Little Rock, Hot Springs and Texas Railway		MP, RI		1893	1899	Little Rock and Hot Springs Western Railroad	
Little Rock and Hot Springs Western Railroad		MP, RI		1899	1911	Rock Island, Arkansas and Louisiana Railroad, St. Louis, Iron Mountain and Southern Railway	
Little Rock Junction Railway		MP		1883	1922	Missouri Pacific Railroad	
Little Rock, Maumelle and Western Railroad				1907		N/A	
Little Rock and Memphis Railroad		RI		1887	1898	Choctaw and Memphis Railroad	
Little Rock, Mississippi River and Texas Railway		MP	172	1875	1887	St. Louis, Iron Mountain and Southern Railway	
Little Rock and Monroe Railway		MP		1903	1909	St. Louis, Iron Mountain and Southern Railway	
Little Rock, Pine Bluff and New Orleans Railroad		MP		1868	1873	Texas, Mississippi and Northwestern Railroad	
Little Rock, Pine Bluff and White River Railway		SSW		1884	1886	Pine Bluff, Monroe and New Orleans Railway	
Little Rock, Sheridan and Saline River Railway				1892		N/A	
Little Rock and Southern Railroad		RI		1902	1905	Rock Island, Arkansas and Louisiana Railroad	
Little Rock and Texas Railway		SLSF		1887	1926	St. Louis – San Francisco Railway	
Louisiana and Arkansas Railroad		KCS		1898	1902	Louisiana and Arkansas Railway	
Louisiana and Arkansas Railway	L&A, LA	KCS		1902	1992	Kansas City Southern Railway	
Louisiana, Arkansas and Missouri Railroad				1887		N/A	
Louisiana and Pine Bluff Railway	LPB			1905	1979	N/A	
Louisville, New Orleans and Texas Railway of Arkansas		IC		1889	1946	Illinois Central Railroad	
Malvern and Camden Railway		RI		1911	1913	Rock Island, Arkansas and Louisiana Railroad	
Malvern and Freeo Valley Railway				1905		N/A	
Manila and Southwestern Railway		SSW		1904	1930	St. Louis Southwestern Railway	
McCrory and Beedeville Southern Railway				1911	1914	N/A	
Memphis, Dallas and Gulf Railroad		KCS		1910	1922	Graysonia, Nashville & Ashdown Railroad; Murfreesboro, Nashville, Southwestern Railway	
Memphis, Helena and Louisiana Railway		MP		1901	1903	St. Louis, Iron Mountain and Southern Railway	
Memphis and Little Rock Railroad		RI		1877	1887	Little Rock and Memphis Railroad	
Memphis and Little Rock Railroad		RI		1853	1873	Memphis and Little Rock Railway	
Memphis and Little Rock Railway		RI		1873	1877	Memphis and Little Rock Railroad	
Memphis, Paris and Gulf Railroad		KCS		1906	1910	Memphis, Dallas and Gulf Railway	
Meto and Arkansas Valley Railway				1910	1911	Pine Bluff and Northern Railway	
Meto Valley Railway				1908	1910	Meto and Arkansas Valley Railway	
Midland Valley Railroad	MV	MP		1903	1966	N/A	
Mississippi, Arkansas and Western Railway				1902		N/A	
Mississippi and Little Rock Railway				1890		N/A	
Mississippi, Ouachita and Red River Railroad		MP		1855	1873	Texas, Mississippi and Northwestern Railroad	
Mississippi River, Hamburg and Western Railway		MP		1897	1909	St. Louis, Iron Mountain and Southern Railway	
Mississippi River and Northwestern Railroad							
Missouri and Arkansas Railway	MAR, MA			1935	1946	Arkansas and Ozarks Railway, Helena and Northwestern Railway, Cotton Plant-Fargo Railway	
Missouri and Louisiana Railroad							
Missouri and North Arkansas Railroad	M&NA			1906	1935	Missouri and Arkansas Railway	
Missouri Pacific Railroad	MP	MP		1917	1997	Union Pacific Railroad	
Montana Railroad (of Arkansas)				1915	1935	N/A	
Monte Ne Railway				1902	1911	Kansas City and Memphis Railway	
Murfreesboro and Nashville Railroad				1947	1952	N/A	
Murfreesboro–Nashville Railway				1932	1947	Murfreesboro and Nashville Railroad	
Murfreesboro, Nashville, Southwestern Railway				1925	1932	Murfreesboro–Nashville Railway	
Noble Lake and Southern Railway							
North Arkansas and Western Railway		SLSF		1899	1901	Ozark and Cherokee Central Railway	
Ouachita Valley Railway				1904		N/A	
Ozark and Cherokee Central Railway		SLSF		1901	1907	St. Louis and San Francisco Railroad	
Paragould and Buffalo Island Railway		SSW		1887	1893	Paragould Southeastern Railway	
Paragould–Memphis Railroad						N/A	
Paragould and Memphis Railway				1902		Paragould–Memphis Railroad	
Paragould Southeastern Railway		SSW		1893	1958	St. Louis Southwestern Railway	
Paris–Subiaco Traction Company				1908	1909	Fort Smith, Subiaco and Eastern Railroad	
Perla Northern Railroad				1904		N/A	
Perla, Princeton and Southern Railroad				1889		N/A	
Pine Bluff Arkansas River Railway		SSW		1898	1934	N/A	
Pine Bluff and Eastern Railroad		SSW		1892	1898	Pine Bluff Arkansas River Railway	
Pine Bluff, Monroe and New Orleans Railway		SSW		1884	1889	Pine Bluff and Eastern Railroad	
Pine Bluff and Northern Railway				1910	1929	N/A	
Pine Bluff, Sheridan and Southern Railway				1912		N/A	
Pine Bluff and Swan Lake Railway		SSW		1884	1886	Pine Bluff, Monroe and New Orleans Railway	
Pine Bluff and Western Railroad		MP		1903	1909	St. Louis, Iron Mountain and Southern Railway	
Pine Bluff and Western Railway		MP		1899	1903	Pine Bluff and Western Railroad	
Portland and Southeastern Railway				1905		N/A	
Prescott and Reader Railway				1910		N/A	
Reader Railroad				1925	1975	N/A	Remains as a tourist railroad
Rock Island, Arkansas and Louisiana Railroad		RI		1905	1948	Chicago, Rock Island and Pacific Railroad	
Rock Island and Dardanelle Railway		RI		1911	1938	N/A	
Rock Island, Stuttgart and Southern Railway		RI		1913	1948	Chicago, Rock Island and Pacific Railroad	
Rogers Southwestern Railway				1904	1907	Arkansas, Oklahoma and Western Railroad	
Saginaw and Ouachita River Railroad				1905		N/A	
St. Louis, Arkansas and Texas Railway		SSW		1887	1891	St. Louis Southwestern Railway	
St. Louis, Arkansas and Texas Railway		SLSF		1880	1882	St. Louis and San Francisco Railway	
St. Louis, Caruthersville and Memphis Railroad		SLSF		1897	1901	St. Louis and Memphis Railway	
St. Louis, Iron Mountain and Southern Railway		MP		1874	1917	Missouri Pacific Railroad	
St. Louis, Kennett and Southeastern Railroad		SLSF		1906	1950	St. Louis – San Francisco Railway	
St. Louis and Memphis Railway		SLSF		1901	1902	St. Louis, Memphis and Southeastern Railroad	
St. Louis, Memphis and Southeastern Railroad		SLSF		1902	1907	St. Louis and San Francisco Railroad	
St. Louis and North Arkansas Railroad				1899	1906	Missouri and North Arkansas Railroad	
St. Louis – San Francisco Railway	SLSF	SLSF		1916	1980	Burlington Northern Inc.	
St. Louis and San Francisco Railroad		SLSF		1896	1916	St. Louis – San Francisco Railway	
St. Louis and San Francisco Railway		SLSF		1882	1896	St. Louis and San Francisco Railroad	
St. Louis, San Francisco and New Orleans Railroad		SLSF		1902	1907	St. Louis and San Francisco Railroad	
St. Louis Southwestern Railway	SSW	SSW		1891	1997	Union Pacific Railroad	
Saline Bayou Railway				1905		N/A	
Saline River Railway				1897		N/A	
Searcy and Des Arc Railroad		RI		1899	1904	Chicago, Rock Island and Pacific Railway	
Searcy and West Point Railroad		RI		1882	1899	Searcy and Des Arc Railroad	
South Central Arkansas Railway	SCK			1982	1983	East Camden and Highland Railroad	
Southern Missouri and Arkansas Railroad		SLSF		1900	1902	St. Louis, Memphis and Southeastern Railroad	
Southwestern Arkansas and Indian Territory Railroad		MP		1884	1900	Arkansas Southwestern Railway	
Springfield and Memphis Railroad		SLSF		1880	1883	Kansas City, Springfield and Memphis Railroad	
Stuttgart and Arkansas River Railroad		SSW		1881	1901	St. Louis Southwestern Railway	
Stuttgart and Rice Belt Railroad		RI		1910	1913	Rock Island, Stuttgart and Southern Railway	
Stuttgart and Southern Railroad		RI		1911	1913	Rock Island, Stuttgart and Southern Railway	
Texarkana and Fort Smith Railway		KCS		1889	1943	Kansas City Southern Railway	
Texarkana and Shreveport Railroad		MP		1888	1899	Texarkana, Shreveport and Natchez Railway	
Texarkana, Shreveport and Natchez Railway		MP		1899	1901	Texas and Pacific Railway	
Texas, Mississippi and Northwestern Railroad		MP		1873	1875	Little Rock, Mississippi River and Texas Railway	
Texas & Northeastern Railway				1872			Other than an optimistic 1872 map suggesting the merger of the Arkansas Central, Helena & Corinth, and the Pine Bluff & Southwestern to form this, no evidence such a combined railway got off the ground. The Arkansas Central later became part of the Arkansas Midland Railroad. No info at all re: the existence of the others.
Texas and Pacific Railway	T&P, TP	MP		1901	1976	Missouri Pacific Railroad	
Texas and St. Louis Railway		SSW		1881	1886	St. Louis, Arkansas and Texas Railway	
Thornton and Alexandria Railway				1904		N/A	
Tyronza Central Railroad		SLSF		1902		Kansas City, Fort Scott and Memphis Railway	
Ultima Thule, Arkadelphia, and Mississippi Railway				1877	1910	Memphis, Dallas and Gulf Railway	
Waldo and Fort Smith Railroad				1893		N/A	
Warren, Johnsville and Saline River Railroad				1905	1920	Warren and Saline River Railroad	
Warren and Ouachita Valley Railway	W&OV, WOV	RI		1899	1980	Warren and Saline River Railroad	
Washington and Hope Railway		MP		1877	1882	Arkansas and Indian Territory Railway	
White and Black River Valley Railway		RI		1890	1941	Operated by the Chicago, Rock Island and Pacific Railway from 1904	
White River Railway		MP		1901	1903	St. Louis, Iron Mountain and Southern Railway	
White River, Lonoke and Western Railway		RI		1898	1901	Choctaw, Oklahoma and Gulf Railroad	
Wilmar and Saline Valley Railroad				1904		N/A	
Wilson Northern Railway		SLSF		1904	1912	Jonesboro, Lake City and Eastern Railroad	
Wyandotte and Southeastern Railway							
Yazoo and Mississippi Valley Railroad		IC		1889	1946	Illinois Central Railroad	

Electric

- Inter-City Terminal Railway
