= Stack Barn =

- U.S. National Register of Historic Places
- Location within Arkansas Location within the United States
- Location: AR 94, Monte Ne, Arkansas
- Coordinates: 36°17′38″N 94°2′57″W
- Area: less than one acre
- Built: 1901
- MPS: Benton County MRA
- NRHP reference No.: 87002353
- Added to NRHP: January 28, 1988

The Stack Barn is an unusual and historic barn in Benton County, Arkansas. It is located near Monte Ne about 500 feet (150 m) south of Arkansas Highway 94 1.5 miles (2.4 km) east of its junction with the spur route of AR 94 leading to the old Monte Ne resort area. Built in 1901, the barn's features are an amalgam of styles found from Pennsylvania to the American South. It is rectangular in shape, with a tin gabled roof that has a slight projection near the top at one end (a hay hood), and board-and-batten siding. Unlike typical Arkansas barns, it is set on slope with a stone foundation, creating a bank barn with an accessible basement more typical of northeastern barns, and necessitating a proper floor (rather than dirt) for the main level. The interior is laid out like a fairly typical 19th-century midwestern three-portal barn.

The barn was listed on the National Register of Historic Places in 1988.

== See also ==
- National Register of Historic Places listings in Benton County, Arkansas
