= Hicks Station =

Coordinates: 35.094°N 90.613°W

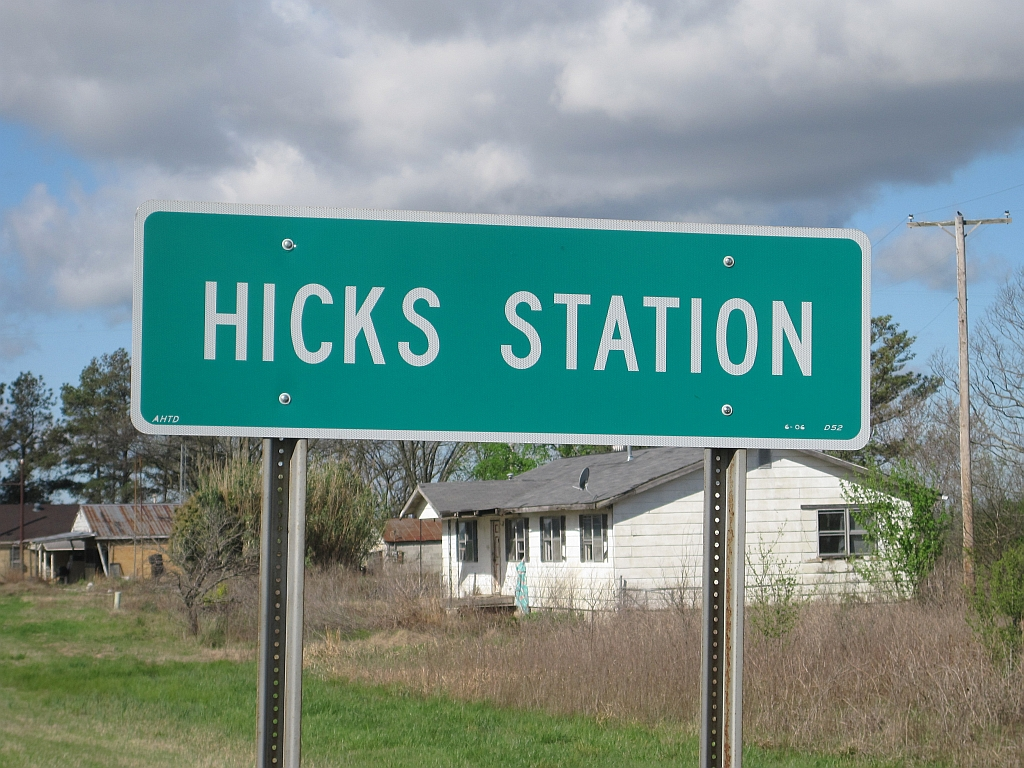

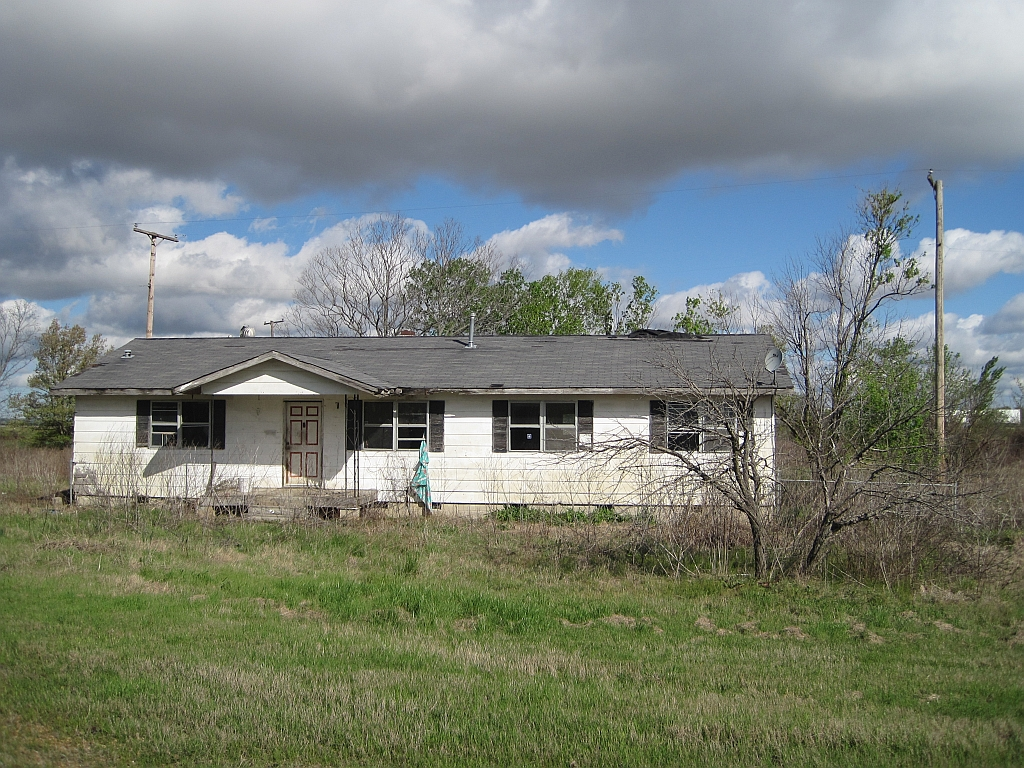

Hicks Station is a historic train depot site in Prairie County, Arkansas and the name of a hamlet and former post office. The original location was about 1.5 miles (2.4 km) east of where it was moved. It was along the Memphis and Little Rock Railroad between DeValls Bluff and Huntersville, Arkansas (in the area of what is now North Little Rock), 25 miles east of Little Rock. Huntersville burned in 1872. A commemorative marker recounts its history. A historical marker commemorates Hicks Station's history in the Civil War.

== History ==
Hicks' Station was established by William Frields Hicks. It was later relocated. Hicks engaged in the mercantile trade at the station before settling in what became Lonoke. In 1870 Hicks Station had a post office and in 1872.

== See also ==
- Arkansas Highway 75
- U.S. Route 70 in Arkansas
