= Arkansas Midland Railroad =

Defunct railroad in Arkansas

Overview
- Headquarters: Helena
- Locale: Arkansas
- Dates of operation: 1853–1910

Technical
- Track gauge: 4 ft 8 1/2 in (1,435 mm) standard gauge
- Previous gauge: 3 ft 6 in (1,067 mm) and 3 ft (914 mm)
- Length: 77 miles (124 km)

The Arkansas Midland Railroad (“Midland”), chartered in 1853, together with associated companies created a rail line eventually running from Helena, Arkansas to Clarendon, Arkansas, with a branch running from Glenwood to Woodsville, Arkansas. The route ended up as branches of the St. Louis, Iron Mountain and Southern Railway (“Iron Mountain”) in 1910.

== History ==
=== The beginnings ===
The Midland was formed in 1853 by citizens of Helena, and was intended as a fairly straight ”air-line railroad” running from Helena west to Little Rock, Arkansas, about 115 miles. Helena, on the Mississippi, was a prosperous river port, and Little Rock was the state capitol. Prior to the Civil War, the line was graded from Helena to a point variously described as twelve miles short of Little Rock, or fifteen miles west of the White River; however, no trackage was built.

=== Arkansas Central Railway ===
Following the chaos of the Civil War and its immediate aftermath, the Arkansas Central Railway was formed in 1871 specifically to obtain the graded right-of-way of the Midland. The railroad projected adding a branch from Duncan to Clarendon, the latter being a prosperous river port on the White River and a future connection point for the Texas and St. Louis Railway (“T&SL”). The railroad also intended to add a branch from some point on its line to Pine Bluff. The company actually built from Helena through Marvell, Pine City and Holly Grove to Duncan, as well as the “branch” from Duncan to Clarendon, essentially creating a 48-mile long mainline from Helena to Clarendon starting service in 1872. Being constructed during the narrow-gauge railway movement in the U.S., the line was originally projected as a 3-foot gauge railroad, and toward that goal a 3-foot gauge locomotive was purchased. However, management subsequently decided to build a 3 foot, 6 inch gauge line instead, which required different locomotives but still made the Arkansas Central the first narrow-gauge railway in Arkansas. In 1877, amid financial difficulties, the Arkansas Central Railway was sold through an intermediate buyer back to the Midland, which company was still in existence.

=== Gauge changes ===
The Midland converted its 3 foot, 6 inch gauge line to 3-foot gauge in 1883 in order to achieve gauge compatibility with the T&SL at Clarendon. When the T&SL converted to standard-gauge in 1886, the Midland followed in 1887.

=== Brinkley, Helena and Indian Bay Railway ===
Separately, the Brinkley, Helena and Indian Bay Railway was a 3-foot gauge line built in 1889 from a spur off the Midland trackage at Pine City to the town of Brinkley, Arkansas, which also had a connection to the T&SL as well as to the Memphis and Little Rock Railroad and what became the shortline White and Black River Valley Railway. The line was 24 miles in length, plus a 5-mile spur from Glenwood to Woodsville. In 1891 the Midland bought that company. But it did not convert the line to its own standard-gauge until September 1900, and it continued to run the line as a separate railroad until 1909.

=== The Iron Mountain ===
In 1901, control of the Midland was acquired by interests associated with railway "robber baron" Jay Gould, but the railway continued to be operated separately. However, from early 1910, the trackage began being operated simply as two separate branches of the Iron Mountain.

=== Subsequent abandonments ===
The portion of the old mainline to Clarendon from Holly Grove was eliminated in 1957. In 1960, the entire Pine City-to-Brinkley branch was abandoned. The mainline was shortened further in 1976 when the portion to Holly Grove from Marvell was dropped. In 1979, the remainder of the original system was abandoned.

== Railroads with similar names ==
This Arkansas Midland Railroad discussed above should not be confused with the Arkansas Midland Railroad created in 1992 and currently in operation. The Arkansas Central Railroad discussed above should not be confused with the Arkansas Central Railroad formed about 1897, which ran from a point near Fort Smith to Paris in Arkansas and was owned by the Missouri Pacific Railroad.
