= EMD GP28 =

Model of American diesel locomotive

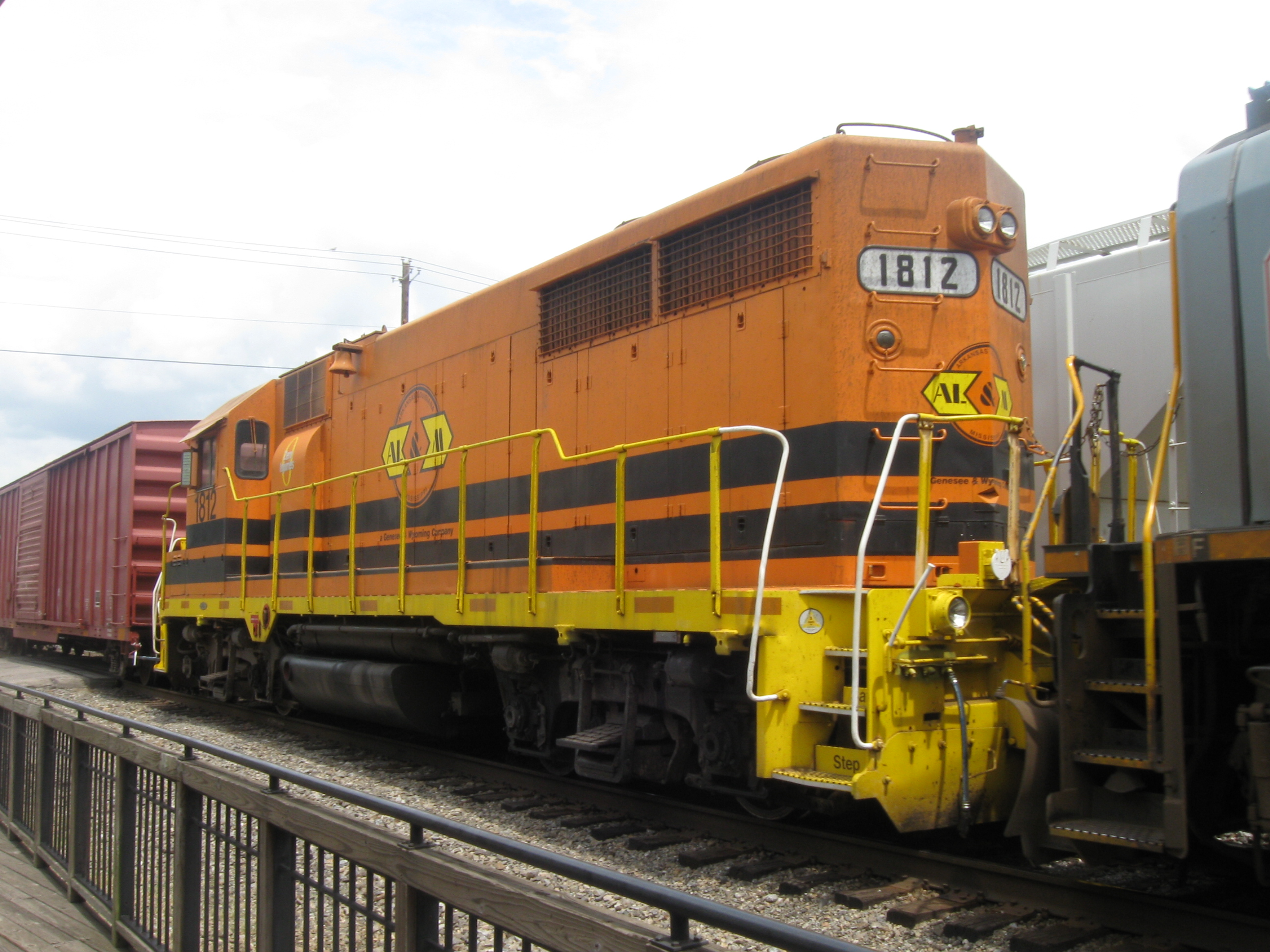
- Arkansas, Louisiana and Mississippi Railroad #1812 in Irondale, Alabama in 2010.
Type and origin
- Power type: Diesel-electric
- Builder: General Motors Electro-Motive Division (EMD)
- Model: GP28
- Build date: March 1964 – November 1965
- Total produced: 31
Specifications
- Gauge: 4 ft 8 1/2 in (1,435 mm) standard gauge
- Prime mover: EMD 16-567D1
- Engine type: V16 diesel engine
- Cylinders: 16
Performance figures
- Power output: 1,800 hp (1.34 MW)
Career
- Locale: United States, Mexico, and Peru

An EMD GP28 is a 4-axle diesel-electric locomotive built by General Motors Electro-Motive Division between March 1964 and November 1965. Power was provided by an EMD 16-567D1 16-cylinder engine which generated 1,800 horsepower (1.34 MW). This locomotive was basically a naturally aspirated version of the EMD GP35.

16 examples of this locomotive model were built for American railroads, 10 were built for Mexican railroads, and five were built for use in Peru.

== Original buyers ==
| Railroad | Quantity | Road numbers | Notes |
|---|---|---|---|
| Chihuahua Pacific Railroad | 10 | 801-810 | 808-810 equipped with high short hood and steam generators |
| Illinois Central Railroad | 12 | 9429-9440 | |
| Mississippi Central | 1 | 211 | to Illinois Central 9441 |
| Southern Peru Copper Corporation | 5 | 26-30 | |
| Kansas, Oklahoma and Gulf Railway | 2 | 700, 701 | to Texas and Pacific Railway 570, 571, to Missouri Pacific Railroad 700-701 |
| Texas Mexican Railway | 1 | 856 | |
| Total | 31 | | |
