= Arkansas Southern Railroad =

Overview
- Headquarters: Russellville, Arkansas
- Reporting mark: ARS
- Locale: Arkansas and Oklahoma
- Dates of operation: 2005–Present

Technical
- Track gauge: 4 ft 8 1/2 in (1,435 mm)
- Length: 63 mi (101 km)

The Arkansas Southern Railroad (reporting mark ARS) is a short-line railroad which started service in October 2005. ARS operates two disconnected lines consisting of Heavener, Oklahoma to Waldron, Arkansas (32 miles), and Ashdown to Nashville, Arkansas (29 miles), plus a switch track at Ashdown, for a total of 63 miles. The lines are leased from Kansas City Southern Railway (KCS) to ARS's owner, the Watco Companies (Watco).

== History ==
The Ashdown to Nashville trackage (now known as the Southern Branch), which also serves Saratoga, Tollette, and Mineral Springs, Arkansas, started in 1907 as the Memphis, Paris & Gulf Railroad, later reorganized as the Graysonia, Nashville & Ashdown Railroad. By mid-century, 75% of its business came from hauling cement and quarry rock. After the line was relocated in the 1960s to make room for a dam project, it was purchased in 1998 by KCS. Watco leased the line in 2005, and ARS began operating it in October of 2005.

The Heavener to Waldron line (now known as the Northern Branch), which also serves Bates, Cauthron, and Hon, Arkansas, was completed in 1901 by the Arkansas Western Railroad (later the Arkansas Western Railway), after the KCS had arrived in Heavener five years earlier. In 1904, the line became a KCS subsidiary. In 1960, a large feed mill was built in Waldron, and by the time Tyson Foods acquired the mill, traffic on the rail line was down to twice-a-week shipments of animal food to that plant. With so little traffic, maintenance was deferred and the line deteriorated. In 1983, state and federal funds went to rehabilitating the line. In 1992, Arkansas Western Railroad was merged into KCS, and in 2005, KCS leased the line to Watco. The plant remains a major customer.

== Operations ==
The ARS has eight employees and four locomotives.

The tonnage today is primarily corn and soy, carbon dioxide, and chemicals such as bauxite and acid. The line also offers car storage.

On the Northern Branch, the railroad interchanges with the KCS at Heavener. On the Southern Branch, it interchanges with the KCS at Ashdown, and the Union Pacific Railroad at Nashville.

In 2020, the leases from the KCS on the lines were extended through November 30, 2034.
