= Arkansas Western Railway =

Overview
- Locale: Arkansas and Oklahoma
- Dates of operation: 1904–1992
- Predecessor: Arkansas Western Railroad
- Successor: Kansas City Southern

Technical
- Track gauge: 4 ft 8 1/2 in (1,435 mm) standard gauge
- Length: 32 miles (51 km)

The Arkansas Western Railway operated a 32-mile rail line between Heavener, Oklahoma and Waldron, Arkansas. It bought the assets of its predecessor in 1904, and the company was merged out of existence in 1992.

== History ==
About three years after the Kansas City, Pittsburg & Gulf Railroad (KCP&G) arrived in Heavener in what was then Indian Territory, the Arkansas Western Railroad was incorporated December 13, 1899 to build a line from Heavener to Waldron in Arkansas. The line was about 32 miles in length, passed through Bates, Cauthron, and Hon, Arkansas, and was completed in 1901. The purpose of the railway was to service the timber industry.

The Kansas City Southern (KCS) acquired the KCP&G in a foreclosure sale in 1900. On May 13, 1904 the KCS incorporated a new subsidiary, the Arkansas Western Railway, which then acquired all the assets of the Arkansas Western Railroad on June 1, 1904. The Arkansas Western Railway continued to be operated under that name, but the acquisition allowed “through-service” from Ft. Smith to Waldron, about 45 miles to the south-southeast; however, the round-about route took 3 hours and 15 minutes while making 14 intermediate stops.

In 1932, the railroad built an extension of about 22 miles from Waldron to Forester, Arkansas to service a lumber mill there. But that line was removed soon after the closing of the mill in 1952.

Consideration was given around 1980 to abandonment of the rest of the trackage, but instead the line was rehabilitated by mid-1983 in a project taking private and public funding and utilizing 43,540 crossties, 120,092 rail anchors, 92,035 tons of base aggregate, 29 new timber trestles, and 15 repaired trestles. In 1992, the Arkansas Western Railway was merged into the KCS. In subsequent history, the KCS leased the Heavener-to-Waldron line to Watco in 2005, and the trackage is being operated by the Arkansas Southern Railroad.
