= Ashdown station =

- Memphis, Paris and Gulf Railroad Depot
- U.S. National Register of Historic Places
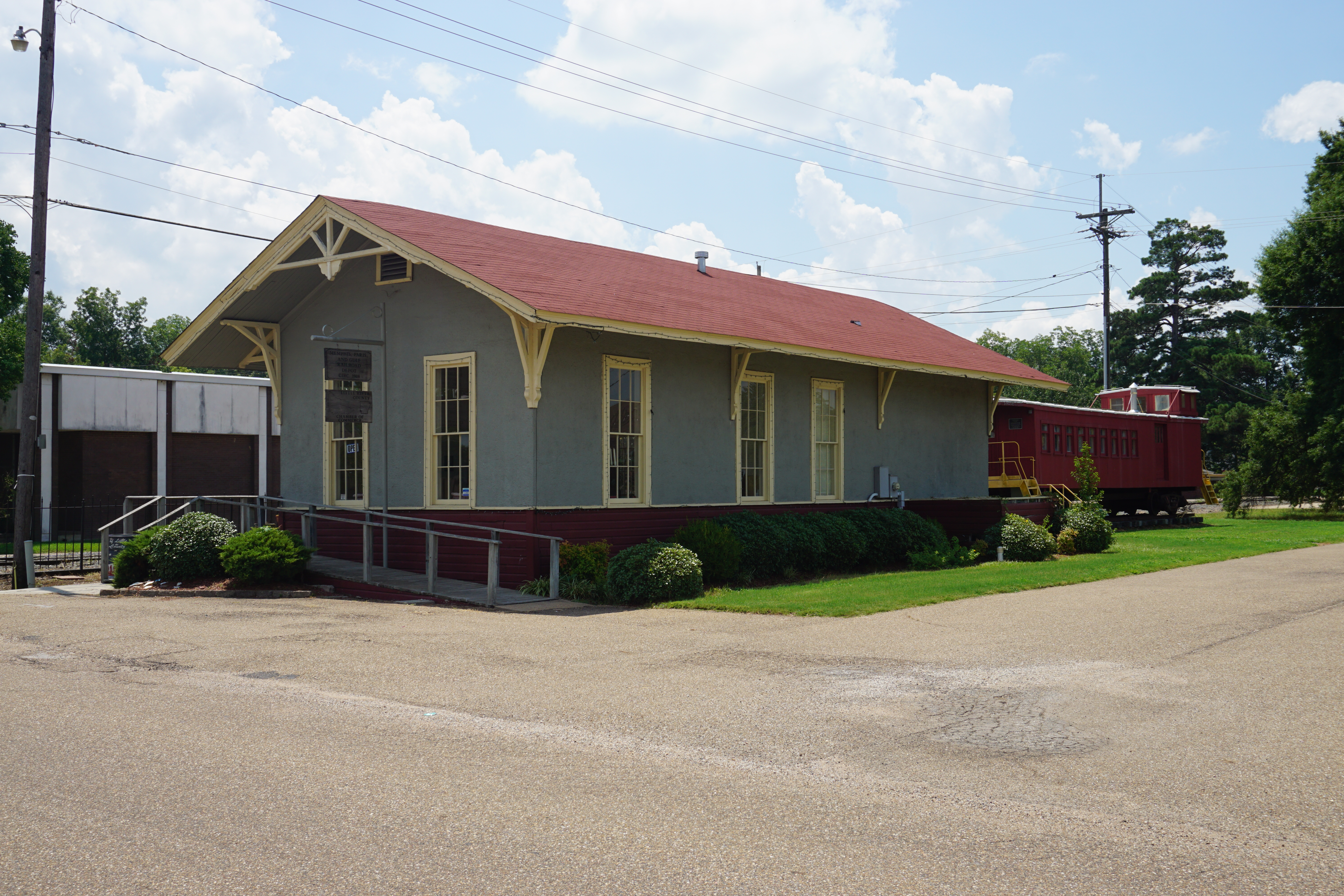

- Location within Arkansas Location within the United States
- Location: Jct. of Whitaker Ave. and Frisco St., N corner, Ashdown, Arkansas
- Coordinates: 33°40′26″N 94°7′42″W
- Area: less than one acre
- Built: 1908
- Built by: Memphis, Paris and Gulf Railroad
- Architectural style: Late 19th And Early 20th Century American Movements
- MPS: Historic Railroad Depots of Arkansas MPS
- NRHP reference No.: 94000192
- Added to NRHP: March 17, 1994

The Memphis, Paris and Gulf Railroad Depot is a historic train station at the junction of Whitaker Avenue and Frisco Street in Ashdown, Arkansas. It is a single-story wood-frame structure in the Plain Traditional style with Folk Victorian elements. Notable decorative elements include brackets in the eaves and Stick-style woodwork in the gables. The exterior of the building is essentially original, while the interior has been extensively altered by multiple uses. The station was built in 1908 by the Memphis, Paris and Gulf Railroad, a regional railroad whose goal was to connect Memphis, Tennessee and Paris, Texas. The railroad was operated, under a variety of names and owners, including the Graysonia, Nashville & Ashdown Railroad, offering passenger service until 1947 and freight service until 1993.

The building was listed on the National Register of Historic Places in 1994.

== See also ==
- National Register of Historic Places listings in Little River County, Arkansas
