= Forester, Arkansas =

Coordinates: 34°46′15″N 93°48′59″W

Forester is an extinct town in Scott County, in the U.S. state of Arkansas. It is located about 21 miles east-southeast of Waldron, Arkansas. The GNIS classifies it as a populated place.

== History ==
Forester was founded in 1930 as a sawmill company town owned by Caddo River Lumber Company. It was named after Charles Forrester, a local businessman. A post office called Forester was established in 1930, and remained in operation until 1953.

In 1932, the Arkansas Western Railway built an extension of about 22 miles from Waldron to Forester to service the sawmill. It was Charles Forester who convinced the railroad to build it.

Caddo River, having cut all the largest timber, sold the town to Dierks Lumber and Coal in 1945. The operation continued, but depletion of the forests caused the mill to shut down in 1952. The buildings were torn down or moved, and the rail line from Waldron was taken out shortly after. However, a reunion park at the log pond has been maintained by The Forester Historical Society since 1983.
