= Little Rock, Mississippi River and Texas Railway =

American railway company

- Arkansas Valley Route

Overview
- Current operator: Union Pacific Railroad
- Headquarters: Little Rock
- Reporting mark: L. R., M. R. & T.
- Locale: Arkansas
- Dates of operation: 1875–1887
- Predecessors: Little Rock, Pine Bluff and New Orleans Railroad Company; Mississippi, Ouachita and Red River Railroad Company
- Successor: St. Louis, Iron Mountain and Southern Railway

Technical
- Track gauge: 4 ft 8 1/2 in (1,435 mm) standard gauge
- Length: 172 miles (277 km)

The Little Rock, Mississippi River and Texas Railway (L. R., M. R. & T.), commonly known as the Arkansas Valley Route, was an American railway company that operated in southeastern Arkansas from 1875 to 1887. The railway's mainline was 113 miles (182 km) long and ran between Little Rock (near the center of the state) and Arkansas City (near the Mississippi River), passing through Pine Bluff. It had about 172 miles (277 km) of track, including sidings, rail yards and branch lines, including the Ouachita Division to Collins (with stage for points in southeastern Arkansas and northern Louisiana) and Monticello.

== History ==
The mainline to Pine Bluff was completed by the Little Rock, Pine Bluff and New Orleans Railroad in 1873, and then to Little Rock by the Little Rock, Mississippi River and Texas Railway on February 25, 1881. Sold under foreclosure to the St. Louis, Iron Mountain and Southern Railway on January 28, 1887, it was subsequently merged into the Missouri Pacific Railroad. Today, most of the line is owned and operated by Union Pacific.

== See also ==
- List of Arkansas railroads
