= G. W. Watson =

African-American state legislator (1861– ?)

George. W. Watson was an American politician. He was a member of the Arkansas Legislature in 1891. He represented Crittenden County as a republican. Watson was included in a photo montage of African American state legislators serving in Arkansas in 1891 published in the Indianapolis Freeman.

Watson was born in 1861 near Holly Springs, Mississippi. He had one brother, and two sisters. After freedom from enslavement, but before becoming a Legislator, Watson worked as a farmer, teacher, Magistrate, and as deputy sheriff. He eventually moved to Hopefield, Arkansas.

== See also ==
- African American officeholders from the end of the Civil War until before 1900
