= Ashley, Drew and Northern Railway =

Overview
- Reporting mark: ADN
- Locale: Arkansas, United States
- Dates of operation: 1912–1996
- Predecessor: Crossett, Monticello & Northern Railroad
- Successor: most abandoned, 5.7 miles sold to Fordyce and Princeton Railroad

Technical
- Track gauge: 4 ft 8 1/2 in (1,435 mm) standard gauge
- Length: 40.7 mi (65.5 km)

The Ashley, Drew and Northern Railway (reporting mark ADN) was a Class III railroad operating 40.7 miles of track between Monticello and Crossett, Arkansas. The railroad operated from 1912 until 1996.

== History ==
In 1905, the Crossett Lumber Company of Crossett, Arkansas, started its own rail line, the Crossett Railway, a 10-mile rail line that largely transported logs and lumber. In 1912, the Crossett Railway was sold to the newly created Crossett, Monticello & Northern Railroad, which had planned to build a line from Crossett north to Monticello, Arkansas.

The Ashley, Drew and Northern was incorporated on August 8, 1912, to build a railroad from Cremer to Monticello, Arkansas. The AD&N also purchased the Crossett, Monticello & Northern Railway at the same time and opened the line up to Monticello in July 1913. From 1914 until 1920, the Ashley, Drew and Northern was leased and operated by the Arkansas, Louisiana and Gulf Railway.

The Georgia-Pacific Corporation acquired control of the AD&N and the Crossett Lumber Company on July 31, 1963.

By the 1980s and 1990s, traffic included lumber, plywood, paper products and chemicals. The railroad's headquarters office and enginehouse both were located in Crossett.

== Abandonment ==
In early 1991, Georgia-Pacific formed the Arkansas, Louisiana and Mississippi Railroad subsidiary to purchase the rail line by the same name, whose owners had been planning to abandon it. Georgia-Pacific soon began transferring southbound traffic to the AL&M's nearby tracks because the AD&N's track was steeper and more expensive to maintain.

On June 25, 1995, Georgia-Pacific announced that the AD&N no longer had sufficient work to justify keeping the line open. On August 15, 1995, Georgia-Pacific petitioned the Interstate Commerce Commission to abandon 35 miles of the AD&N from Monticello to Whitlow Junction, Arkansas. The ICC granted the request to abandon the Ashley, Drew and Northern, and the AD&N made its final run on June 29, 1996. (The railroad's remaining 5.7 miles of track, between Whitlow Junction and Crossett was sold on June 30, 1996, to Georgia-Pacific-owned sister railroad Fordyce and Princeton Railroad, which had long been operating on the segment between Crossett and Whitlow Junction through trackage rights.)
