= Ouachita Division =

Railway line in Arkansas

Overview
- Owner: Little Rock, Mississippi River and Texas Railway
- Locale: Arkansas
- Termini: Trippe; Warren

History
- Completed: August 5, 1882

Technical
- Line length: 49 mi (79 km)
- Track gauge: 4 ft 8 1/2 in (1,435 mm) standard gauge

The Ouachita Division was a 49-mile (79 km) railway line owned and operated by the Little Rock, Mississippi River and Texas Railway in southeastern Arkansas. The line originated in Trippe (near Arkansas City) where it connected to the Little Rock Division (Arkansas Valley Route), and eventually terminated in Warren. This subdivision was formerly the Mississippi, Ouachita and Red River Railroad mainline.
