= Hopefield, Arkansas =

Community in Crittenden County, Arkansas

Coordinates: 35°09′19″N 90°04′29″W

Hopefield was a small community on the Mississippi River in Crittenden County, Arkansas. Its location is near or included within the current limits of the city of West Memphis, Arkansas. It was a ferry crossing point to Memphis, Tennessee, and was served by an east-west rail line built by the Memphis and Little Rock Railroad that eventually became a mainline of the Chicago, Rock Island and Pacific Railway. During the American Civil War General Stephen Hurlbut had the town burned to combat rebel activity. It was rebuilt, hit by a series of Yellow Fever epidemics, and diminished by erosion. Hopefield Chute, an Ox Bow also called Dacus Lake, and Hopefield Lake are in the area, as well as some remains. G. W. Watson moved there.

== History ==
The area was once known as Camp Esperanza under Spanish rule. In the 1840s there were plans to develop land in the area. Several locations in the area were surveyed and marked.

An 1880 report discusses the area being quarantined with mounted men stationed to patrol it.
