= Granite Mountain Quarries Railroad =

The Granite Mountain Quarries Railroad (reporting mark GMQX) is a private rail service of Granite Mountain Quarries in Arkansas operated by McGeorge Construction. Using a fleet of four locomotives and 110 rail cars, the operation assembles unit trains of the crushed rock produced from quarrying, and passes the cars off to the Union Pacific ("UP") for long-distance distribution. The quarry operation gained direct access to the UP in 1969, and bought its own railcars in 2010. Efforts by BNSF Railway to also interchange with GMQX were stymied by the UP in June of 2025.

GMQX locomotives are yellow/gold in color, with a green top or stripe.

In 1990, a Granite Mountain Quarries train hit and overturned a truck moving across its track. The train was pulling 2,600 tons of rock at the time.
