= Camden and Southern Railroad =

Short line railroad in Arkansas, US

Camden & Southern Railroad
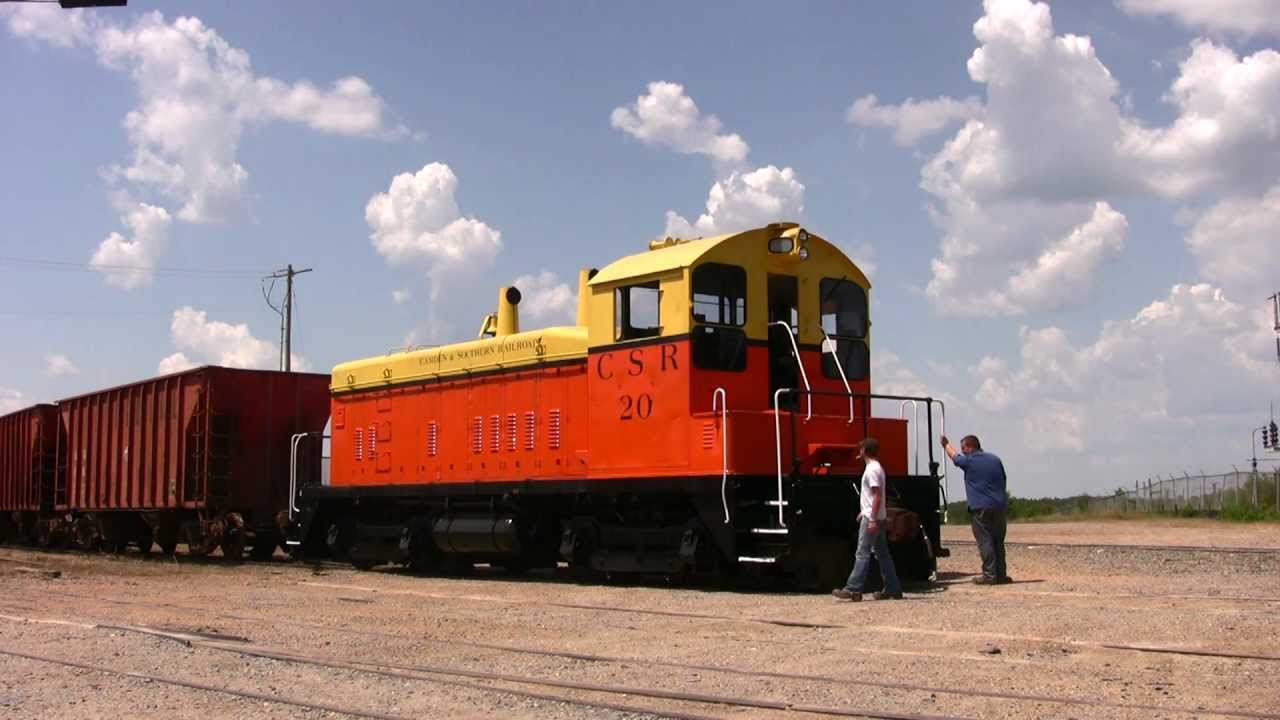

Overview
- Reporting mark: CSR
- Locale: Arkansas
- Dates of operation: 2011–present

Technical
- Track gauge: 4 ft 8 1/2 in (1,435 mm) standard gauge

Camden & Southern Railroad (reporting mark CSR) is a short line railroad that is a part of Arkansas Shortline Railroads, Inc. It interchanges with Union Pacific at Cullendale, Arkansas. It began operations in May 2011 in Russellville, Arkansas. Under guidance of Company Supervisor, Dustin Hall of Camden, it began operations in Ouachita County, Arkansas. It operates over three miles of line leased from the Camden Area Industrial Development Corporation at Cullendale. The railroad traffics a variety of materials, including: forest products, plastic, petroleum and drilling commodities.

Camden & Southern Railroad Corporation is estimated to have an annual revenue of $840,000 and employ approximately 7 people.
