= Warren and Saline River Railroad =

Railway line in Arkansas, United States

Overview
- Headquarters: Warren, Arkansas
- Reporting mark: WSR
- Locale: Arkansas
- Dates of operation: 1920–present

Technical
- Track gauge: 4 ft 8 1/2 in (1,435 mm) standard gauge

The Warren and Saline River Railroad (reporting mark WSR) is an 8-mile (13 km) short-line railroad connecting Cloquet, Arkansas to the Arkansas Midland Railroad at Warren. It has always been independent of larger carriers, and was previously owned by the Potlatch Corporation, a lumber company, until January 2010. WSR is currently operated by the Arkansas Midland Railroad and was sold by Pinsly Railroad Company to sold to Genesee & Wyoming Industries in 2014.

WSR traffic generally consists of outbound lumber and other forest products.

== History ==
The Warren, Johnsville and Saline River Railroad was incorporated in August 1905 to serve logging operations in Bradley County. It opened a line from Warren south to Fullerton that year, and completed extensions from Fullerton to the Chicago, Rock Island and Pacific Railroad near Hermitage in 1909 and to Goepel (Mt. Olive) in 1910. A new Warren and Saline River Railroad was incorporated in March 1920 and took over the property.

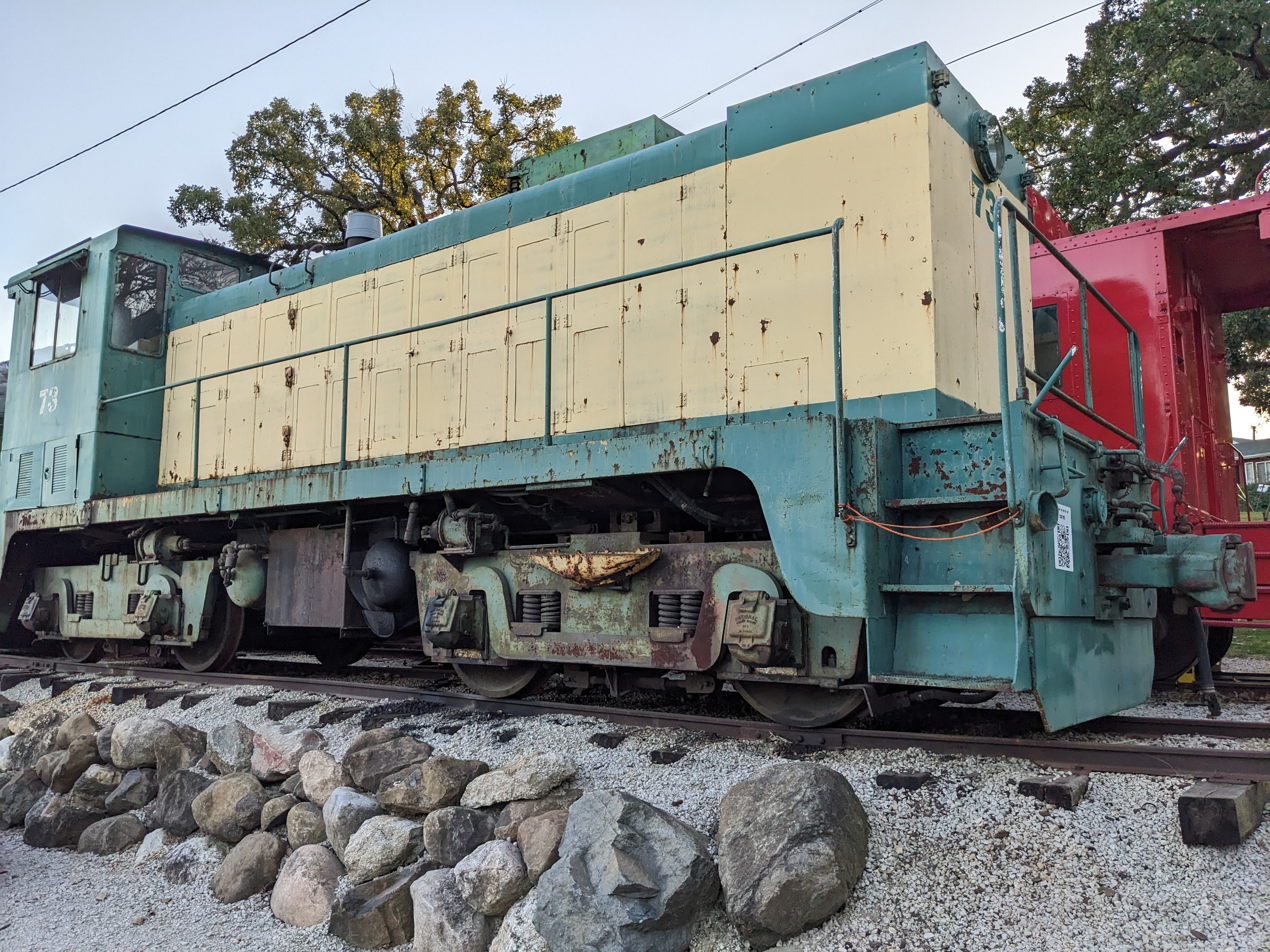
Warren and Saline River Railroad 73 at the Fox River Trolley Museum on October 5th, 2024.

The branch to Gospel was abandoned at some point, and in 1985 the mainline to Hermitage was cut back to Cloquet. The WSR also operates about five miles of the former Warren and Ouachita Valley Railroad, a connecting shortline which operated to the west from Warren.

On December 5, 2014, Genesee & Wyoming filed a Notice of Exemption with the Surface Transportation Board to acquire WSR along with AKMD and another affiliate Prescott & Northwestern Railroad (PNW) from Pinsly.
