= Arkansas, Louisiana and Mississippi Railroad =

Class III railroad

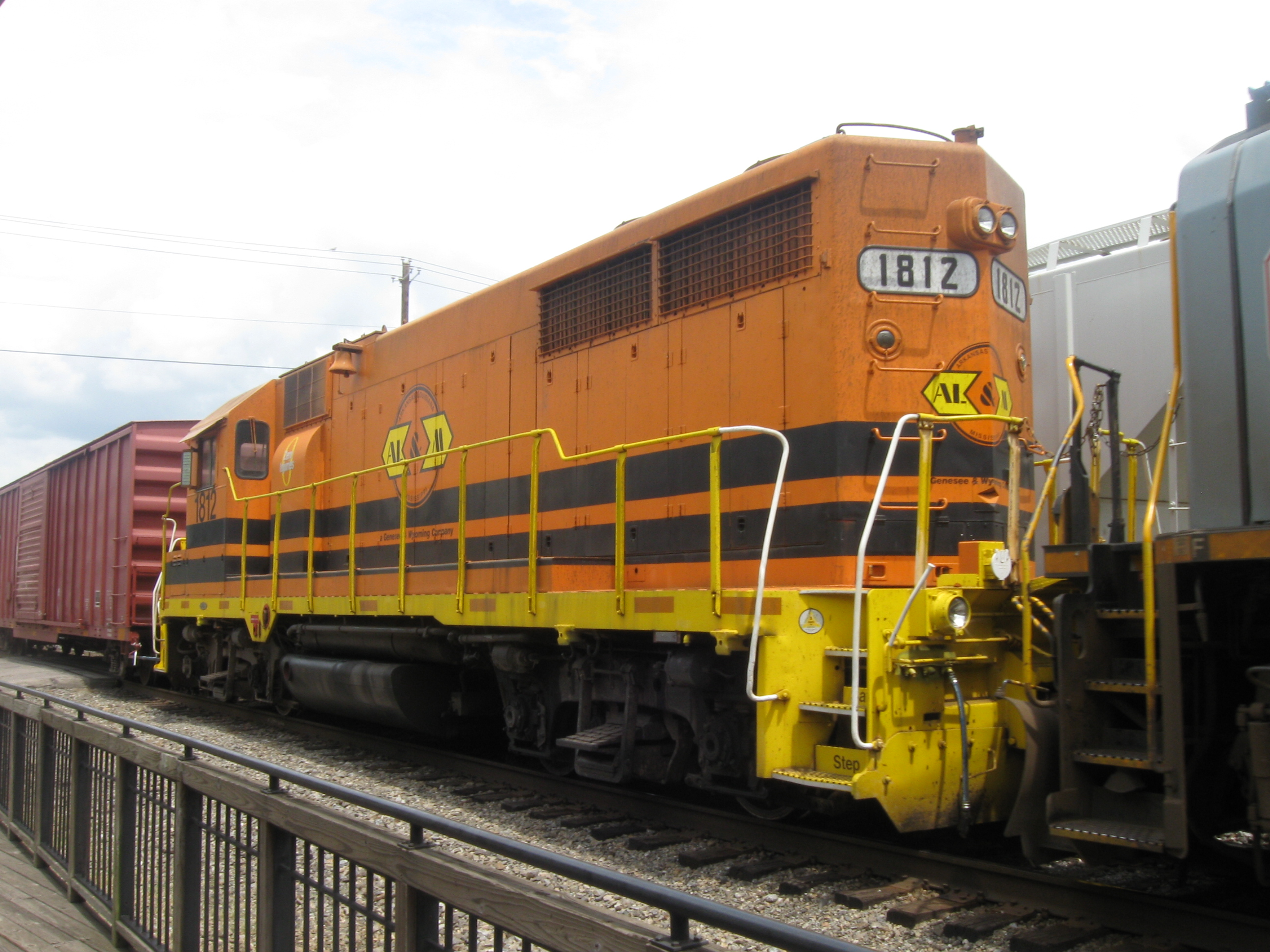
- ALM #1812, a rare and now scrapped EMD GP28, westbound through Norfolk Southern Norris Yard in Irondale, Alabama.

Overview
- Headquarters: Crossett, Arkansas
- Reporting mark: ALM
- Locale: Arkansas and Louisiana
- Dates of operation: 1991–present

Technical
- Track gauge: 4 ft 8 1/2 in (1,435 mm) standard gauge
- Length: 117 miles

The Arkansas, Louisiana and Mississippi Railroad (reporting mark ALM) is a 117-mile (188 km) short-line railroad in northern Louisiana and southern Arkansas. Opened in 1908, it has undergone several corporate reorganizations, but has remained independent of larger carriers. In 2004, paper producer Georgia-Pacific sold the company to shortline operator Genesee & Wyoming Inc. Traffic generally consists of lumber, paper, forest products, and chemicals.

The AL&M runs north from Monroe, Louisiana, on the Canadian Pacific Kansas City's Meridian Speedway, through Bastrop and Crossett, Arkansas, to Fordyce, generally paralleling U.S. Routes 165 and 425. At Crossett, until 2023, the AL&M interchanged with the affiliated Fordyce and Princeton Railroad, which hauls its cars to the Union Pacific Railroad at Fordyce. In 2023, the Fordyce and Princeton was absorbed into the AL&M. A branch from Rolfe Junction to Hamburg, Arkansas, was abandoned in 1920, with the grade reused for a county road; in 2006 the AL&M leased a segment of line in Bastrop from the Union Pacific Railroad.

== History ==
The Arkansas, Louisiana and Gulf Railway (AL&G) was incorporated in July 1906 to connect Monroe with Pine Bluff, Arkansas. The latter city was never reached, and the line as opened in October 1908 ended at Hamburg and Crossett. It entered receivership in May 1913, and in December 1914 the newly organized Arkansas, Louisiana and Gulf Railroad leased both the Arkansas, Louisiana and Gulf Railway and the Crossett-Monticello Ashley, Drew and Northern Railway (AD&N), the latter owned by the Crossett Lumber Company. Alfred Cowles of Chicago bought the AL&G's property at foreclosure in September 1915, and in November the reorganized Arkansas and Louisiana Midland Railway (A&LM) acquired the Monroe-Crossett line, but the branch to Hamburg remained with Cowles. The A&LM took over the AL&G Railroad's lease of the AD&N, and leased the Hamburg line. Steam operations on the line ended by 1960.

The A&LM was not successful, and entered receivership in February 1920, terminating the AD&N lease in March. Operations north of Bastrop were suspended in May, and the property was sold in July and conveyed in August to the new Arkansas and Louisiana Missouri Railway. The Interstate Commerce Commission approved permanent abandonment of the Hamburg branch, now a county road, and resumption of operation to Crossett. The new AL&M also obtained trackage rights over the Missouri Pacific Railroad from Bastrop to Dollar Junction and Huttig, Arkansas, the two ends of the 1.88-mile (3.03 km) Louisiana and Pine Bluff Railway. The AL&M leased the latter company, which provided access to a saw mill, until its dissolution in 1979.

The current name was adopted in September 1991, when Georgia-Pacific organized the Arkansas, Louisiana and Mississippi Railroad to purchase the A&LM. The AD&N, then owned by Georgia-Pacific as successor to the Crossett Lumber Company, was abandoned in August 1995, and Genesee & Wyoming Inc. purchased several of Georgia-Pacific's railroads, including the AL&M, in January 2004. In 2006, the AL&M leased from the Union Pacific Railroad 4.24 miles (6.82 km) of line at Bastrop, which had previously been owned by the Missouri Pacific Railroad.

== Locomotive fleet ==
No.	Build date	Model	Serial no.	Disposition	Notes
11	March 1950	SW7	11232	Sold to the Chattahoochie Industrial Railroad (CIRR)	
12	January 1951	SW7	15636	Sold to the Chattahoochie Industrial Railroad (CIRR)	
14	January 1953	SW9	17365	Sold to the Chattahoochie Industrial Railroad (CIRR)	
1017	September 1948	NW2	6589	Sold to the Georgia Southwestern Railroad (GSWR)	
1501	November 1953	CF7	18417	-	
1502	November 1953	CF7	18917	-	
1513	-	CF7	-	-	
1514	May 1951	CF7	13794	-	
1566	June 1976	GP15-1	757142-17	-	
1784	-	CF7	-	-	
1812	March 1964	GP28	28937	Scrapped	Scrapped due to the G&W EPA scandal
1815	November 1964	GP28	29632	-	
1816	March 1963	GP28	29593	-	
