= Graysonia, Nashville & Ashdown Railroad =

Shortline rail carrier in Arkansas, US

Overview
- Locale: Arkansas
- Dates of operation: 1922–1998

Technical
- Track gauge: 4 ft 8 1/2 in (1,435 mm)
- Length: 27 mi (43 km)

The Graysonia, Nashville & Ashdown Railroad was a shortline rail carrier in the state of Arkansas, with rails running from Nashville, Arkansas to Ashdown, Arkansas. It operated from 1922 to 1998.

== History ==
=== Ultima Thule, Arkadelphia, and Mississippi Railway ===
As background, the Ultima Thule, Arkadelphia, and Mississippi Railway (the “Ultima Thule”) was organized in June of 1883. The goal was to run a logging railroad from Arkadelphia, Arkansas west to Ultima Thule, Arkansas, which was a trading post community located west of present-day De Queen, Arkansas and just to the east of the Choctaw Nation (now the border with Oklahoma). However, the starting point of the railroad was a connection with the St. Louis, Iron Mountain and Southern Railway (“Iron Mountain”) at Daleville, Arkansas, which was in the Arkadelphia area and the then-site of the Arkadelphia Lumber Company, but was actually somewhat east of present-day Arkadelphia and on the opposite shore of the Ouachita River. The trackage as built ended up running southeast through Dalark to Sparkman, Arkansas, also a lumber town and on the same side of the river. This was about 17 miles in length. (As to the “Mississippi” part of the line’s name, both the river and the state remained far to the east.)

=== Antoine Valley Railroad ===
The Antoine Valley Railroad, which started around the turn of the century, was also in service of a lumber company, but switched finished lumber to the Iron Mountain rather than hauling logs. The line ran from a point known as McLeod west to a connection at Graysonia, about 6 miles.

=== Memphis, Paris and Gulf Railroad ===
Incorporated in 1906, the original vision of the Memphis, Paris and Gulf Railroad (“MP&G”) was to be a lumber road linking Nashville, Arkansas to Memphis, Tennessee and Paris, Texas. It built about 26 miles of trackage from Ashdown, Arkansas northeast to Nashville, Arkansas beginning in 1906, and constructed about 15 miles of tracks northeast from Nashville through Tokio, Arkansas to Murfreesboro, Arkansas in 1908, giving it about 41 miles of mainline in total.

=== Memphis, Dallas and Gulf Railway ===
In 1910, when the lumber company parents of the three railroads merged, the MP&G acquired the disconnected Ultima Thule and Antoine Valley lines, renaming itself the Memphis, Dallas and Gulf Railway (“MD&G”). This gave it about 64 miles of total trackage. However, the Ultima Thule line was quickly abandoned around 1911, both because logging was thinning out in that area and because the trackage was not on the MD&G’s preferred route east. It subsequently acquired two other unconnected logging lines, being the Caddo and Choctaw Railroad, running from a point called Cooper a short distance northeast to Rosboro, Arkansas where it connected to the Iron Mountain, and the Glenwood, Hot Springs & Western Railroad, which ran from a point on the Iron Mountain just north of Rosboro about 20 miles northeast to a point near Hot Springs, Arkansas, the intention of the MD&G being to try to stitch together a route from its mainline trackage all the way into Hot Springs. But the MD&G’s line was later extended only to Shawmut, Arkansas, giving the company about a 61-mile mainline from Ashdown to Shawmut. In any event, the MD&G went into foreclosure in 1922.

=== Enter the Graysonia, Nashville & Ashdown Railroad ===
The Graysonia was incorporated to purchase the entire Ashdown-to-Shawmut route out of MD&G’s foreclosure. However, 19 miles were abandoned, and the 15-mile segment from Nashville to Murfreesboro ended up with the new Murfreesboro, Nashville, Southwestern Railway, which ran it until that line too was abandoned in 1952. That left the Graysonia with about 27 miles from Nashville to Ashdown. (Graysonia, Arkansas, then a lumber mill town and now a ghost town, did not end up on the final route, being northeast of and not between Nashville and Ashdown.)

By mid-century, 75% of the Graysonia’s business came from hauling cement and quarry rock. The trackage was relocated in the 1960s to make room for a dam project. In 1998, the line was purchased by the Kansas City Southern.

The trackage was subsequently leased to Watco in 2005, and is currently operated by the Arkansas Southern Railroad.

== Equipment and buildings ==
In 1926, the line obtained a Baldwin 2-6-0 “Mogul” steam freight engine, originally numbered as #203 but later renumbered as #26. That engine, sold by the line in 1952, is now on static display at the Illinois Railway Museum as the Graysonia Nashville & Ashdown 26.

Other locomotives used at one time or another include #55, an Alco S4 diesel; #74R, also an S4; and, #80, an EMD MP15DC diesel.

The Graysonia train depot in Ashdown, Arkansas appears on the National Register of Historic Places listings in Little River County, Arkansas as the Memphis, Paris and Gulf Railroad Depot.
