= Paragould Southeastern Railway =

Industrial railway in Arkansas and Missouri, United States

Overview
- Headquarters: St. Louis, Missouri
- Locale: Arkansas and Missouri
- Dates of operation: 1887–1914

Technical
- Track gauge: 4 ft 8 1/2 in (1,435 mm)
- Previous gauge: Narrow
- Length: 37.335 mi (60.085 km)

The Paragould Southeastern Railway (“PSR”), originally the Paragould and Buffalo Island Railway, was an industrial line initially started to carry timber products from lands east of Paragould, Arkansas, into town. It acquired its first trackage in 1887, and eventually extended its line to Blytheville, Arkansas, over 37 miles from Paragould. The trackage was absorbed into the St. Louis Southwestern Railway, known as the “Cotton Belt,” in 1914.

== History ==
=== Paragould and Buffalo Island Railway ===
The city of Paragould was in a lumbering area, and the need was for a rail line to bring logs to the mills located there. The Paragould Stave Manufacturing Company built a tramway east from Paragould, the line being about 4 miles long, narrow-gauge, and reputedly laid with wooden rails.

The Paragould and Buffalo Island Railway was incorporated October 11, 1887. It acquired the tramway that month, and in 1888 extended it about 4 miles to Bertig, Arkansas. To avoid construction problems in the swampy areas around the St. Francis River bottoms, the line was built upon the 40-mile long by 15-mile wide sandy ridge known as Buffalo Island located in Craighead and Mississippi counties in Arkansas.

=== Name change and extension ===
Because of foreclosure on a local mill in 1888, the line was inactive for a time. However, the owners persuaded the Cotton Belt to furnish them with thirty-five pound steel rails and a narrow gauge locomotive to run on them. In 1893, due to a charter amendment, the name of the railroad was changed to the Paragould Southeastern Railway, the tracks were widened to standard-gauge, and the line was extended to Cardwell, Missouri, about 2 additional miles. A charter amendment dated August 12, 1897, allowed extension of the line to Hornersville, Missouri, about 11 miles, which was done by October 25, 1897. A charter change on December 11, 1901, authorized a final extension to Blytheville, Arkansas. However, the line was not actually extended from Hornersville to Chickasawba, Arkansas, about 15 miles, until April 5, 1903; and, the final mile from Chickasawba to Blytheville was not completed until January 27, 1907. At that point, the railroad had a single-track mainline totaling 37.335 miles.

=== Cotton Belt ===
The Cotton Belt had obtained control of the PSR back on May 27, 1893. However, the PSR continued to operate independently until leased to the Cotton Belt on January 1, 1914, after which it was operated as just another part of the Cotton Belt.
