= Arkansas and Oklahoma Railroad =

Train line (1898–1901)

Overview
- Locale: Arkansas and Oklahoma
- Dates of operation: 1898–1901

Technical
- Track gauge: 4 ft 8 1/2 in (1,435 mm) standard gauge
- Length: 47 miles (76 km)

The Arkansas and Oklahoma Railroad was a line running about 47 miles from Rogers, Arkansas to Grove, Oklahoma. It was formed in 1898, and sold its assets in 1901.

== History ==
As background, the town of Rogers was founded as a stop on the line of a St. Louis–San Francisco Railway (Frisco) predecessor. That line, on which the first train arrived in Rogers on May 10, 1881, bypassed the county seat of Bentonville, Arkansas. So in 1883, a corporation called the Bentonville Railroad Company proceeded to link Rogers with Bentonville, about six miles.

Within that framework, the Arkansas and Oklahoma Railroad Company (A&OR) was incorporated April 1, 1898, under the laws of Arkansas. On November 17, 1900, the A&OR purchased the Bentonville Railroad line between Rogers and Bentonville. The A&OR also built, between 1898 and 1900, about 41 miles of track northwesterly from Bentonville through the town of Gravette, Arkansas-- where it crossed the tracks of the Kansas City, Pittsburg and Gulf Railroad, later absorbed by the Kansas City Southern Railway— and on to Grove, then in Indian Territory. This gave the railroad a mainline between Rogers and Grove of about 47 miles of standard gauge single track.

The line did handle some passenger traffic. However, it was particularly important for the transportation of fruit products, particularly apples, facilitating growth of the Ozark fruit industry.

This line was sold on June 21, 1901, to the St. Louis and San Francisco Railroad Company. That entity in turn was sold to the Frisco under foreclosure on September 15, 1916. In subsequent history, the Bentonville-to-Grove route was abandoned September 9, 1940. However, the spur between Rogers and Bentonville remains active.
