= Arkansas, Oklahoma and Western Railroad =

American small railway company from 1908 to 1911

Overview
- Locale: Arkansas, Rogers and Siloam Springs
- Dates of operation: 1908–1911
- Successor: Kansas City and Memphis Railway

Technical
- Track gauge: 4 ft 8 1/2 in (1,435 mm)

The Arkansas, Oklahoma and Western Railroad (AO&W) was a small railroad company in Northwest Arkansas, United States.

It began operations as the Rogers Southwestern that reached Springtown, Arkansas (21 mi or 34 km southwest of Rogers) on August 15, 1906. It then reorganized under the name Arkansas, Oklahoma and Western and reached Siloam Springs on January 1, 1908. The standard gauge AO&W, also called the "All Off & Walk", was 30 miles (48 km) in length. It hoped to prosper by serving fruit growers in south-central Benton County (where it got its nickname "Fruit Belt Line") and by serving as a Kansas City Southern Railway feeder at Siloam Springs.

The "Fruit Belt Line" and the Monte Ne Railway (a 5 mi or 8.0 km standard gauge line opened in 1902 for tourist traffic between Lowell and the new resort at Monte Ne), after both going bankrupt were merged into the newly formed Kansas City and Memphis Railway in 1911, and headquartered in Rogers, Arkansas. The new company built a branch to Fayetteville from Cave Springs that was not successful because it largely duplicated the Frisco line between Rogers and Fayetteville. Burdened by over expansion and inadequate traffic volume, the KC&M entered receivership on July 14, 1914. Efforts to revive the line were not successful and the 61-mile (98 km) Kansas City and Memphis system was abandoned in pieces between March and October 1918. The KC&M abandonment was the second largest U.S. railroad abandonment of 1918.

In Summer 1910, the AO&W constructed a concrete underpass beneath the Frisco track north of Lowell. The purpose was to connect the isolated Monte Ne Railroad to the AO&W. Although the Monte Ne Railroad was a failure as a passenger carrier, it enjoyed a substantial volume of outgoing freight traffic from the Rogers White Lime Company located at Limedale on the Monte Ne Railroad. Construction of the underpass enabled the Monte Ne to turn over much of its outbound freight business to the AO&W (KC&M) rather than competitor Frisco. The concrete underpass bears a date of 1910 and is still crossed by trains of Frisco Central Division successor Arkansas and Missouri Railroad.
