= Augusta Railroad =

Train line (1886–1959)

Overview
- Headquarters: Augusta, Arkansas
- Locale: Arkansas
- Dates of operation: 1886–1959

Technical
- Track gauge: 4 ft 8 1/2 in (1,435 mm) standard gauge
- Length: 2.654 miles (4.271 km)

The Augusta Railroad (“AUG”) and its predecessors constituted a short-line railroad connecting Augusta, Arkansas to the national rail grid. AUG's original segment was built in 1886, and the line ended in 1958 or 1959. It was less than 2 miles in length.

== History ==
=== Augusta and White River Railroad ===
Augusta, the county seat of Woodruff County, Arkansas, was a natural riverboat landing spot on the navigable White River. After the chaos of the American Civil War and its immediate aftermath, the town entered its greatest period of prosperity in the 1870s as a year-round riverboat transport point for a wide variety of goods, serving vessels from as far away as Memphis and New Orleans. Thus, when railroads began entering the county in the late 1800s, the good people of Augusta opted out of the apparently-unnecessary innovation and allowed their town to be bypassed by the tracks. When river traffic began to decline, the citizens realized their mistake, and decided to build their own railroad to link to the national grid.

The Augusta and White River Railroad was incorporated in 1886 under the laws of Arkansas. It constructed approximately 1.25 miles of mainline track between Augusta and a point south-southeast of town known as New Augusta, where the railway interchanged with the Missouri Pacific Railroad line between Bald Knob, Arkansas and Memphis, Tennessee. Whether or not relating to the mistake of failing to get railroad routed through their town earlier, the nickname of the railway was the “Little Dummy Line.”

=== Augusta Tramway and Transfer Company ===
This arrangement lasted until 1892. In May of that year, a company called the Augusta Tramway and Transfer Company was incorporated under Arkansas law. It received and started operating the assets of the earlier company while extending the tracks slightly, adding about a quarter of a mile to the mainline. However, this entity went into receivership on February 22, 1916.

=== AUG Operations ===
The railroad was bought out of a receiver's sale on December 20, 1917, by individuals who took over operation of the line from the receiver on January 1 of 1918, and who finally got around to officially incorporating the Augusta Railroad on May 8 of that year. A snapshot of the railway on June 30, 1918, shows a single-track, standard-gauge mainline grown to 1.649 miles, plus 1.005 miles of yard tracks and sidings. The railroad had two steam locomotives, and also possessed a passenger car. The principal offices were in Augusta. The railroad ran in this fashion for many decades; however, it ceased operations in 1958 or 1959.
