= Southwestern Arkansas and Indian Territory Railroad =

The Southwestern Arkansas and Indian Territory Railroad was a railway in the U.S. state of Arkansas in the late 19th century. It began with the opening in September 1885 of a 15-mile 3 ft (914 mm) narrow gauge line between Smithton and Okolona, with a 10-mile-long extension added in July 1887 between Smithton and Hebron, all in Clark County, Arkansas. The line was converted to 4 ft 8 1/2 in (1,435 mm) standard gauge in 1891.

== Arkansas Southwestern Railway Co. ==
The line was sold at foreclosure on 13 March 1900 after receivership was begun in March 1896, after which it was reorganized on 28 April 1900 as the Arkansas Southwestern Railway Co. That operation was sold to the St. Louis, Iron Mountain and Southern Railway in 1909.
