= Fort Smith Railroad =

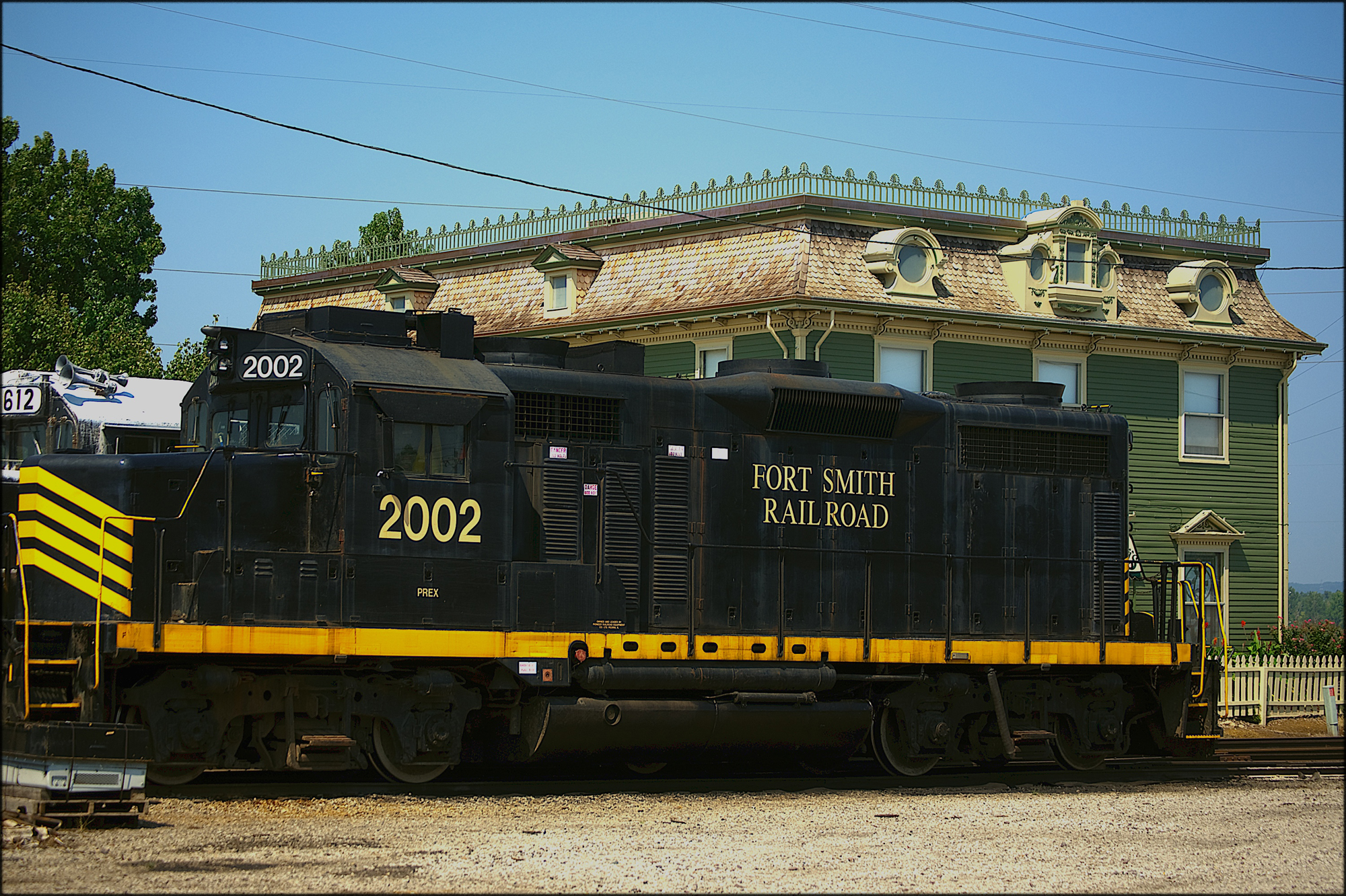
- FSR #2002, an EMD GP20, at Fort Smith in 2002.

Overview
- Headquarters: Fort Smith, Arkansas
- Reporting mark: FSR
- Locale: Arkansas
- Dates of operation: 1991–present

Technical
- Track gauge: 4 ft 8 1/2 in (1,435 mm) standard gauge
- Length: 18 miles (29 km)

The Fort Smith Railroad (reporting mark FSR) is a Class III short-line railroad headquartered in Fort Smith, Arkansas.

FSR operates 18 miles (29 km) of line in Arkansas from Fort Smith (where it interchanges with Kansas City Southern Railway, Union Pacific Railroad, and Arkansas and Missouri Railroad) to Fort Chaffee.

FSR traffic generally consists of grain, food products, paper products, scrap and finished steel, lumber, peanuts, alcohol, military equipment, and charcoal.

The FSR currently operates with three ex-Santa Fe Railroad EMD GP20 locomotives.

FSR is a subsidiary of Pioneer Railcorp.

== History of the Line ==
The line over which FSR operates was built by the Arkansas Central Railroad, incorporated on April 29, 1897. The line was intended to stretch between Ft. Smith and Little Rock, with a branch from a point about 50 miles west of Little Rock to Hot Springs. When the trackage was actually assembled between 1897 and its completion by January 1, 1900, the line only managed to run from a junction off the Missouri Pacific Railroad near Fort Smith to Paris, Arkansas, 42.879 miles, plus 8.214 miles of yard track and sidings, for a total of 52.093 miles.

The line came under control of the Missouri Pacific in 1899, then was transferred in 1903 to the St. Louis, Iron Mountain and Southern Railway, then back to the Missouri Pacific when the Iron Mountain became part of the latter. The Missouri Pacific merger into the Union Pacific was approved by the ICC in 1982. The line was leased to the FSR on July 7, 1991. However, a portion of the line from Ft. Chaffee to Paris was abandoned in August of 1995, leaving the line from Ft. Smith to Ft. Chafee, about 18 miles.

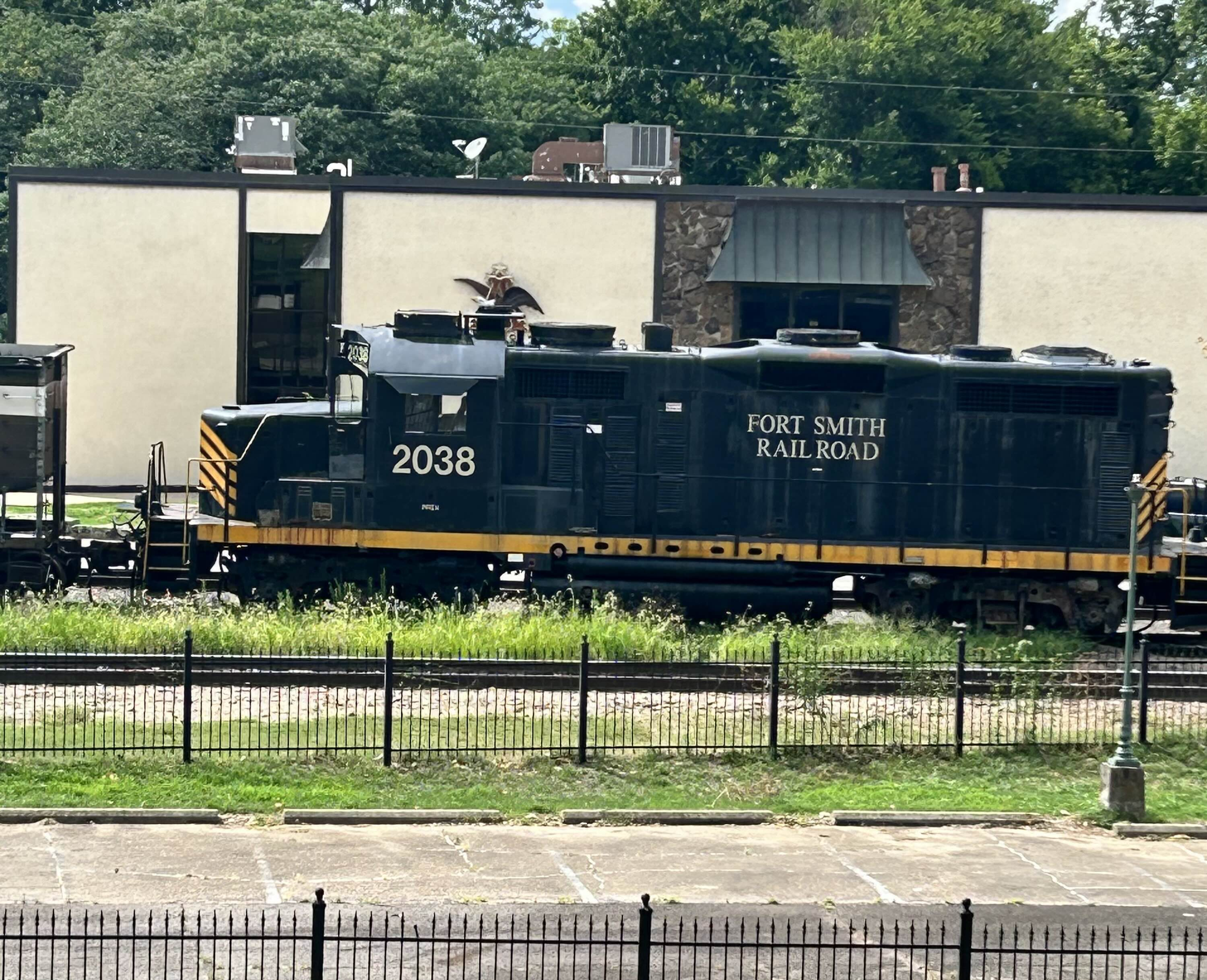
Fort Smith Railroad 2038 July 17 2024

== Locomotive roster ==
Model	Road no.
sd70ace	1995
sd40-2	2002
sd40-2	2031
sd40-2	2038
