= Cauthron, Arkansas =

Unincorporated community in Scott County, Arkansas

Coordinates: 34.921°N 94.297°W

Cauthron is an unincorporated community in Scott County, in the U.S. state of Arkansas.

== History ==
Cauthron was founded in the 1870s, and named after Joe Cauthron, a local judge. A variant name was "Piney". A post office called Cauthron was established in 1871, and remained in operation until 1973.
