= Monte Ne =

Location in Arkansas

- U.S. National Register of Historic Places
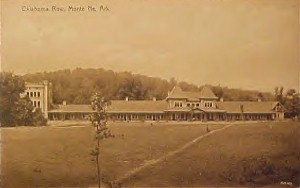
- "Oklahoma Row" Hotel in 1910

- Location within Arkansas Location within the United States
- Location: Benton County, Arkansas, United States
- Nearest city: Rogers
- Coordinates: 36°17′14″N 94°04′09″W
- Area: 0.1 acres (0.040 ha)
- Built: 1900–1930
- Built by: W. H. "Coin" Harvey
- Architect: A. O. Clarke
- NRHP reference No.: 78000575
- Added to NRHP: February 2, 1978

Monte Ne was a health resort and planned community established and operated by William Hope Harvey from 1901 into the 1920s. It was located in a valley just east of the town of Rogers, Arkansas, though today its location is mostly under the waters of Beaver Lake. The resort consisted of several hotels, a lake, an indoor swimming pool, a golf course, tennis courts, bowling alleys, its own post office and bank, as well as a dedicated train line and an imported Italian gondola to conduct guests to the resort. In 1931 Monte Ne was the site of the only presidential convention ever held in the state.

Despite Harvey's efforts to publicize his resort and draw both visitors and businesses, Monte Ne was not a financial success. By 1920 the rail line had been sold and abandoned, and the Monte Ne Bank closed. Given these setbacks, and Harvey's belief that civilization was doomed, he began to focus his efforts on building "The Pyramid", a 130-foot tall obelisk that would eventually contain books and objects that reflected human life in the 20th century, preserving them for future generations to discover. Harvey exhausted his funds constructing an elaborate amphitheater to serve as the pyramid's foundation, and the stock market crash of 1929 ended all hopes of raising the necessary money to build the pyramid.

By the time of Harvey's death in 1936, most of the resort's assets had been sold off. Some of the resort buildings were repurposed and continued to be used on and off until the 1960s, when the United States Army Corps of Engineers began construction of a dam on the White River, creating Beaver Lake. The lake flooded almost the entirety of the resort, with only the remnants of one hotel tower and some building foundations still regularly visible. This tower was demolished in February 2023 by the Corps of Engineers, citing ongoing vandalism and health hazards posed by the deteriorating structure. And yet, when Beaver Lake levels drop sufficiently, portions of the enigmatic amphitheater become visible again.

== William Hope 'Coin' Harvey ==
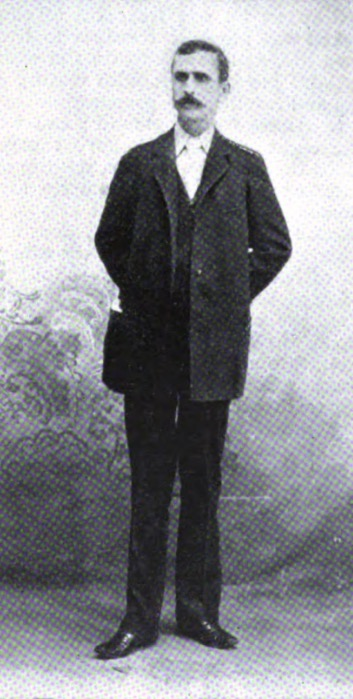
William Hope Harvey in 1895

William Hope "Coin" Harvey was a well-known and successful lawyer, businessman, politician, author and lecturer in the 1890s. His 1894 pamphlet, "Coin's Financial School", sold over one million copies in its first year, and earned him the nickname 'Coin'. Harvey's belief in the economic topic of "Free Silver" had a strong influence on 1896 Democratic presidential nominee William Jennings Bryan, and Harvey actively campaigned for Bryan during that year's election. This campaigning led Harvey to visit northwest Arkansas. In 1900 he purchased land near a small village called Silver Springs, and renamed the area "Monte Ne", which he claimed were the Spanish and Native American names for "mountain" and "water". Harvey wrote, "The people of Arkansas are to be congratulated on having no large city and no extremely rich people. For these reasons I have come here to make my home".

Harvey and his family moved into an existing house on the property of Monte Ne. In December 1901 the house burned and destroyed much of the family's belongings. Harvey's wife, Anna, moved to Chicago and only returned once to Monte Ne, for the funeral of their son Hal in 1903.

== Initial construction projects ==
In December 1900, with $52,000 of individual investors' money and $48,000 of his own, Harvey formed the Monte Ne Investment Company, which held the deeds to all of the land. Initial projects included dredging a canal and constructing a lagoon along with various bridges and walkways for guests. In 1900 the construction of the first hotel was begun, and the Hotel Monte Ne was completed in April 1901. It was three stories high and had two wings 300 feet (91 m) long. The grand opening of the resort was held on May 4, 1901. According to the Springfield Republican newspaper, "The ball being given tonight is the most brilliant social event that has ever occurred in this section, and marks the beginning of a new era in the social world of Northwest Arkansas".

In July of that year Harvey imported a 50-foot gondola from Italy and began selling rides on the lagoon. In August, Harvey's son and brother-in-law opened a bathhouse featuring a 25-foot by 50-foot indoor pool, complete with slides, springboards, and heated water, the first in Arkansas. A two lane bowling alley was also added.

== Railroad ==
Monte Ne Railway Company
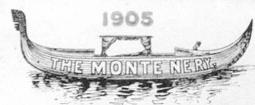

Overview
- Headquarters: Monte Ne, Arkansas
- Locale: Arkansas, Monte Ne and Lowell
- Dates of operation: 1902–1908
- Successor: Arkansas, Oklahoma & Western Railroad

Technical
- Track gauge: 4 ft 8 1/2 in (1,435 mm) standard gauge

Harvey needed a way to get people to Monte Ne. In 1900, there were few adequate roads, and automobiles were not yet practical. Harvey chose to build a five-mile (8 km) railroad line spur from the St. Louis and San Francisco Railroad ("Frisco") in Lowell, Arkansas, to Monte Ne. The Arkansas Railroad Commission granted a charter on April 26, 1902, and the Monte Ne Railway Company was incorporated the following month with a capital stock of $250,000. Harvey purchased an engine, a tender, and a passenger coach from the Frisco Railroad and built a large log depot along the bank of the lake at Monte Ne. He employed his imported gondola to move guests from the rail depot to the resort hotels, and Harvey often promoted Monte Ne as: "the only place in America where the gondola meets the train". The line was opened on June 19, 1902, and former presidential candidate and friend William Jennings Bryan spoke at the opening ceremony.

Unfortunately for Harvey, the railroad was not a success. Its service was erratic, and many guests actually arrived via special Frisco excursion trains. In 1908 the Monte Ne rail line was sold to the Arkansas, Oklahoma & Western Railroad (AO&W) and then to the Kansas City & Memphis Railroad (KC&M) in 1910 when the former went bankrupt. Passenger service continued until 1914, and the line hauled lumber and freight for a few years longer.

== Further hotel construction ==
Harvey envisioned adding more hotels to Monte Ne. He retained the services of A. O. Clarke, a successful architect from St. Louis. In April 1904 the Monte Ne Club House Hotel and Cottage Company was organized with $250,000 in capital and with Clarke as both the chief architect and superintendent. Five hotels were proposed: a three-story main building called the Club House Hotel and four "cottage rows", each to be named for a state bordering on Arkansas.

The first two hotels commissioned were the Missouri Row and the Club House Hotel. Missouri Row was designed to be 46 feet (14 m) wide and 305 feet (93 m) long and built of 8,000 logs and 14,000 cubic feet (400 m^{3}) of concrete. Red tiles for the roof were shipped from Chicago. The Club House Hotel was designed to use stone and concrete, “as palatial as a Roman imperial villa” with an 18-foot-high waterfall in the lobby. In May 1905, in order to speed construction, workers were asked to work longer hours for no increase in pay. The workers went on strike, and Harvey fired them.

Harvey was involved in a physical altercation with one of the workers, who was unhappy about what had been written about him in the Monte Ne newspaper. The worker alleged Harvey pulled a gun on him, Harvey claimed self defense, but the pistol was knocked to the ground and a scuffle ensued. In the end Harvey required several days of bed rest to recover.

The strike was soon resolved, but work on the Club House Hotel was suspended and despite the fact the first floor was built, it was never finished. All of the workers focused on finishing the Missouri Row, which opened in September 1905 with room rates of $1 a day and $6 a week.

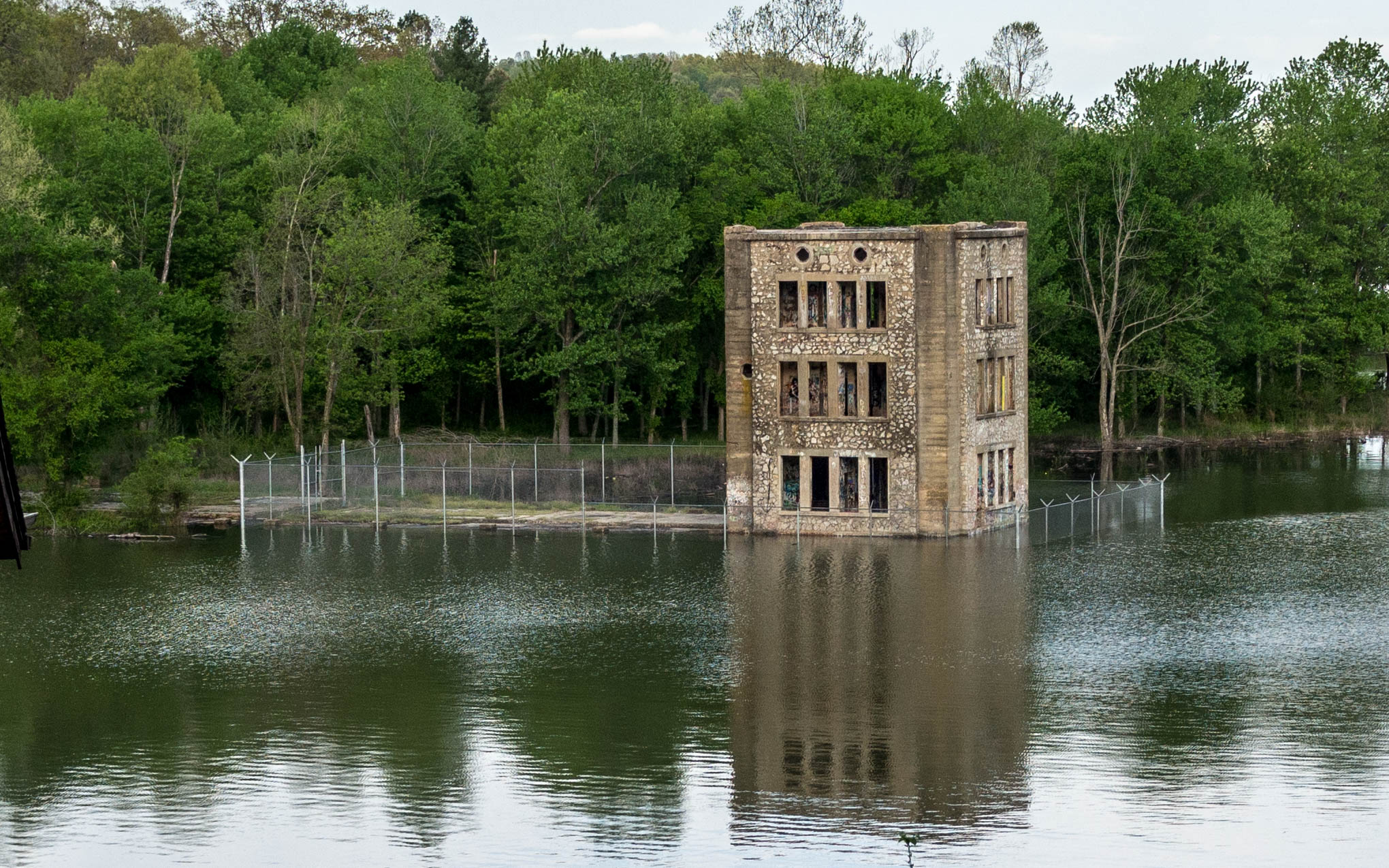
The three-story tower section of Oklahoma Row, demolished in 2023

With financing from almost 300 new stockholders, construction began on the Oklahoma Row in 1907. Also designed by A.O. Clarke, it was another log and tile construction, with a three-story concrete tower on the south end. During this period of construction Harvey was very concerned about the financial situation at the resort, writing to his wife "I am trying to save the ship from sinking". Opening in 1909, all 40 rooms featured electric lights, indoor plumbing, and running spring water. According to an article in the 1963 Daily Oklahoman, it was touted as the largest log hotel in the world. Due to lack of funds, when Oklahoma Row finally opened there was no gala event, as there had been when Missouri Row was finished.

=== Theme song ===
In 1901, Harvey commissioned a theme song for Monte Ne. "Beautiful Monte Ne" was written by a Rogers local, Edward Wolfe, and copyrighted by Harvey in 1906.

Beautiful Monte Ne, God's gift to man they say
Health resort of all the world is beautiful Monte Ne
Rosy cheeks and purer blood they gain there day by day
in mountain air water rare at beautiful Monte Ne

== Business development and resort operations ==
Harvey tried to get businesses to move to Monte Ne, but few actually did. Monte Ne's small downtown area had at one time a general store, a livery stable, a gristmill, and a post office. Harvey issued his own money, or scrip, which was accepted and used as cash in and around Monte Ne. Scrip was a way of financing his mercantile without requiring operating capital. Harvey would purchase items with the scrip and promised to redeem it within 30 days. If the item did not sell, the scrip had no value.

In 1905 Harvey established the Bank of Monte Ne. He again turned to architect A.O. Clarke. He designed a two-story, 50 by 70 ft (15 by 21 m) building (usually referred to as the "Bank Block") including the bank and a store room on the main floor, as well as a lodge room and offices on the second floor. The building was across the street from the post office. The bank operated until 1914, when depositors and lenders were paid off and any other funds were transferred to a bank in Rogers.

To help attract tourists, Harvey often brought in musicians and hosted dances and other events to give Monte Ne a constant festive atmosphere. He used the Monte Ne Herald, run by his son Tom, to promote these events. The newspaper only lasted until 1905, probably due to financial troubles and Harvey's publication of personal attacks. There were sporting events in Monte Ne such as tennis, croquet, and fox hunting. A golf course was built sometime before 1909.

Harvey's difficult-to-please nature often ended up driving away more people than it attracted. Harvey had a lights-out at 10 p.m. policy, and at least once he cut the main electricity to the town in order to enforce his curfew. Disgruntled guests left the next day. He was also criticized for holding events on Sunday and for banning children and people who were ill from the resort.

== Roads ==
By 1913, the Monte Ne railroad has failed and Harvey realized that automobiles were becoming a more common method for vacationers to travel. In 1913 Harvey spearheaded the founding of The Ozark Trails Association (OTA) to promote marking and building (but not financing) quality highways. Not surprisingly, his interest was in bringing people to Monte Ne, as he stated: "My personal interest in the Ozark Trails is that they all lead to Monte Ne", though he said further "My inclination runs toward doing something of a progressive nature that will promote the collective good, and I have now concentrated all that inclination on carrying out the system of roads known as the Ozark Trails".

Arguably, the OTA was William Harvey's most successful endeavor. From the initial meeting at Monte Ne on July 10, 1913, the annual meeting hosted 7,000 delegates in Oklahoma City in 1916. The group built large obelisks, listing the names of the benefactors, along the routes and trails that it sponsored.

Interest in the group began to waver noticeably when Harvey finally stepped down as president at a 1920 convention in Pittsburg, Kansas, that was attended by only 200 delegates. By the mid-1920s, highways and roads had become completely government-funded and there was no longer a need for local sponsorship. The OTA's naming system, using historic names and names of contributors, had also become confusing and inefficient because of the myriad names and disputes over different names for the same stretch of roadway. Therefore, the U.S. Bureau of Public Roads (BPR) changed all the roadways' names to uniform numbers, despite fierce protest from the OTA. The group had lost its relevance and disbanded in 1924, but many of the roads they helped develop became part of the historic U.S. Route 66.

Another group, with no affiliation but with the same name, was created in the early 1970s to promote the maintenance of recreational trails in the Ozarks.

== The Pyramid ==
By 1920, Harvey had suffered more than a decade of personal business setbacks. His son Hal died in a railway accident in 1903, and his other son Tom left in 1908 and never returned. His wife Anna and two daughters moved to Chicago in 1902, and his marriage was permanently estranged. Harvey ran for the Arkansas Third Congressional District Seat in 1913 but lost in the Democratic primary. His Monte Ne was also failing. The railway had been sold and the Bank of Monte Ne had also gone out of business. Few permanent homes and businesses had been constructed. The automobile began to change vacation habits, and rather than take a train to a resort and spend days or weeks, touring the country by automobile became possible. World War I also had an impact on the world economy. Faced with these severe dilemmas, Harvey had begun reasoning that the end of civilization was at hand. In February 1920, he published Common Sense, in which Harvey announced his intention to leave a message for the future in the form of a pyramid.

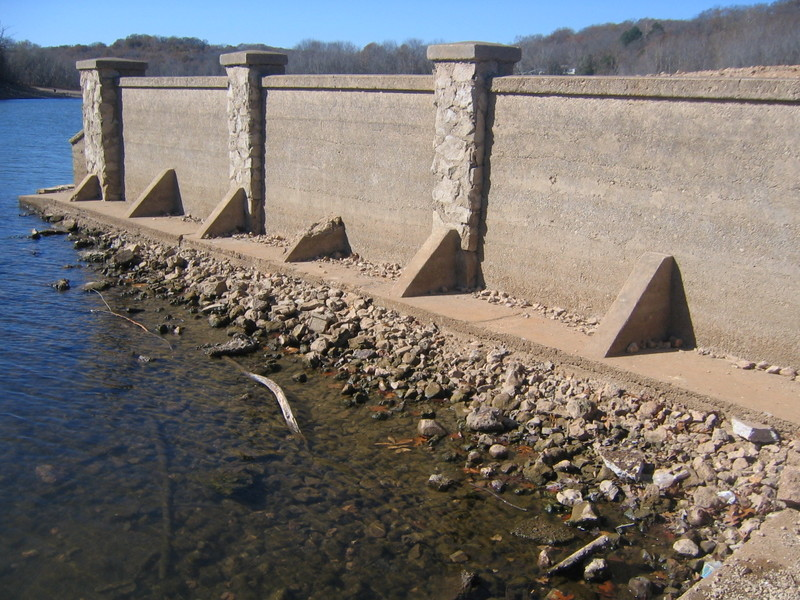
Retaining wall that was built for the Pyramid. It is normally submerged.

Harvey did some deep research into the history of the Ozark Mountains. He claimed that they were some of the oldest mountains in the world and definitely the oldest in the United States. They had been untouched by volcanoes and earthquakes. He believed that the mountains around Monte Ne would eventually crumble and fill the valley with silt and sediment. Figuring that the mountains were approximately 240 ft (73 m) high, Harvey planned to construct a massive concrete obelisk, and its capstone would remain above the debris. Archaeologists in the distant future would be able to dig down and find the monument. He called the project "The Pyramid", and dedicated the rest of his life to its construction.

The obelisk was planned to be 130 feet (40 m) tall. Harvey's books, explaining 20th-century civilization, as well as a world globe, a bible, encyclopedias, and newspapers, were to be placed inside two vaults and hermetically sealed in glass. Harvey also wanted to place in this large room "numerous small items now used in domestic and industrial life, from the size of a needle and safety pin up to a Victrola". It was estimated that the construction would use 16,000 bags of cement, 30,000 ft^{3} (850 m^{3}) of sand, 58,000 ft^{3} (1,600 m^{3}) of gravel, and tons of corrugated steel reinforcement. The Portland Cement Association donated the service of one of its experts, who pronounced that the Pyramid would not deteriorate or suffer from erosion and would last for over a million years. To prevent water in the valley from interfering with the foundation and to shore up the low knoll to support the heavy Pyramid, Harvey constructed a 165 feet (50 m) long retaining wall of stone and concrete.

He also built a roughly semi-circular, terraced amphitheater at the foundation of the Pyramid which he called the "foyer". The land for the amphitheater was first dug in late 1923, and construction continued off and on for the next five years whenever financing, building materials, and labor were available. Unlike other Monte Ne building projects designed by architect A. O. Clark, the amphitheater apparently had no architectural input and was not built according to blueprints or a single design. Those who worked with Harvey noted that he seemed to just "work it out in his mind from day to day". The result was a unique structure, irregular in formation, with seating capacity for anywhere from 500 to 1,000. In the middle of the amphitheater was a small island with two concrete chairs and a concrete couch, intended for an orchestra to play or a speaker to make a presentation. Harvey dedicated the amphitheater before 500 people in 1928.

Following the Egyptian mania that gripped the country after the discovery of King Tut's tomb in 1922, Harvey's Pyramid project sparked a lot of interest and was widely reported throughout the U.S. Tens of thousands of people came to Monte Ne during the 1920s to see its progress, and 20,000 visitors were recorded in a four-month period in 1928 alone.

Harvey moved his office to his cottage next to the amphitheater, as work continued on the Pyramid. In January 1929, Harvey incorporated the project creating The Pyramid Association. The association was to fulfill Harvey's Pyramid plans in the event of his death. The estimated cost of the Pyramid itself was $75,000, but Harvey exhausted his funds on construction of the amphitheater. The stock market crash of 1929 ended all construction. In a last-ditch effort to save the project, Harvey sent letters to wealthy men asking for funds to complete the project. In his letters he explained that civilization was dying and that only rich men, like the intended readers, could save it, if they could send money for his pyramid. Despite the fact that Harvey claimed his correspondence was "the most important letter ever written" he received no replies and the pyramid was never built. All that remains of the project is a retaining wall and the amphitheater that are under the waters of Beaver Lake most of the time.

== Presidential nominating convention ==
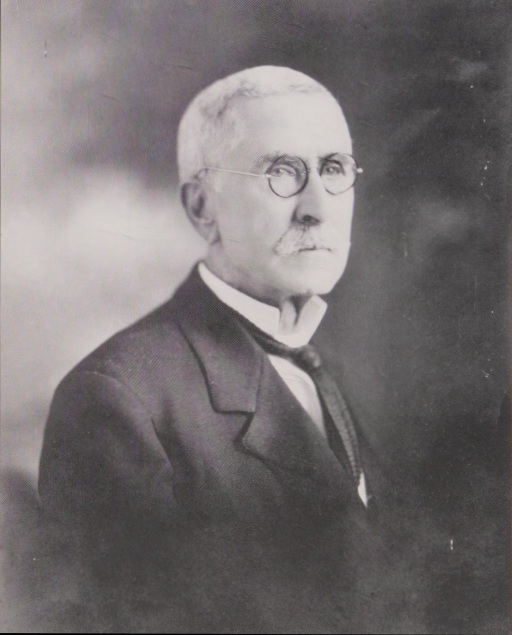
William Harvey in 1936

As Harvey's interests shifted to the Pyramid, Monte Ne's resort days effectively ended and the number of visitors slowly dwindled. Harvey sold the Hotel Monte Ne around 1912, and in 1927 both the Missouri and Oklahoma Rows were foreclosed and sold.

Harvey returned to politics after the 1929 stock market crash and the beginning of the Great Depression. He decided to run for the presidency. He formed the Liberty Party and held their national convention at Monte Ne. It was the only presidential convention ever held in Arkansas. Harvey prepared with railroad excursion rates, media facilities, upgraded roads, and food concessions, anticipating 10,000 delegates. He tented the amphitheater, set up seating, and installed an amplifier system to reach the thousands to be seated outside. Delegates were only eligible to attend if they certified they had read and agreed with the principles of Harvey's newest book, The Book, which dealt with the harmful effects of usury by the government. In the end only 786 delegates attended, and Harvey was the only candidate the delegates could agree on. Franklin Delano Roosevelt won the 1932 presidential election, and Harvey only drew 53,000 votes nationwide, and only two votes in his home county.

== Death of Harvey ==
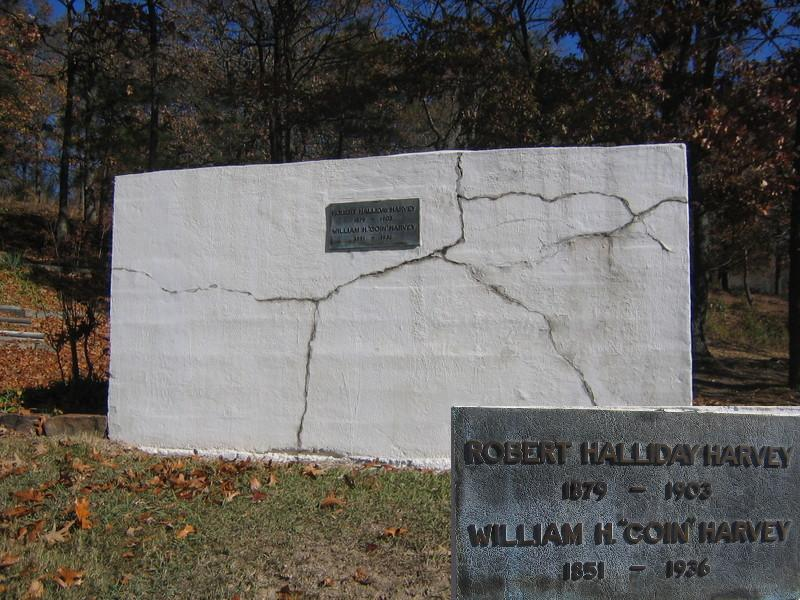
Tomb of William Hope "Coin" Harvey and his son Robert Halliday Harvey

Harvey died on February 11, 1936, at Monte Ne due to peritonitis after an attack of intestinal influenza. The tomb made to house his son in 1903 was blasted open, and Harvey's pine casket and that of his son were placed in a glass casket filled with copies of Harvey's books and some of his other papers. The tomb was then resealed. A small funeral was held on February 14, and a small plaque bearing the names and dates of the two Harveys was posted.

He died with a balance of $138, debt of $3,000 and no will. The courts decided that the property that was still deeded to the Pyramid foundation belonged to his widow, May, who sold it before moving to Springfield, Missouri, never to return. She died in 1948.

== After Harvey ==
The hotels and buildings at Monte Ne had many different fates in the decades after Harvey's death. The Monte Ne Inn, which Harvey sold in 1912, continued operations under a variety of names including the White Hotel, Randola Inn, Hotel Frances, and the Sleepy Valley Hotel. From 1927 to 1932 the Missouri and Oklahoma Row hotels operated as the Ozark Industrial College and School of Theology. In 1944 they were sold to local businessmen, and the Missouri Row was torn down and sold in lots, with the roof ties being sold to a Little Rock, Arkansas law firm. By 1956 it was reported the Missouri Row had collapsed into rubble.

In 1923 Iris Armstrong of Little Rock leased 100 acres near Monte Ne and establish Camp Joyzelle, a summer camp for girls ages 8 to 17 that specialized in drama and the arts. The camp used the abandoned Monte Ne rail depot as the camp's main office, and also employed the amphitheater for its productions. William Harvey, not known for appreciating children, was often an attendee at these performances. The camp continued operations until forced to quit in the early 1960s, when Beaver Lake flooded the area.

The Bank Block, former home of the Monte Ne bank, was used briefly in 1944 by a Rogers poultry equipment manufacturer. It was largely abandoned after that, and ended up as a roofless, windowless, concrete shell.

In the 1930s and 40s, the Oklahoma Row became known as the Club House Hotel and was operated by various entities. In 1945 it was acquired by Iris Armstrong and used to house parents of girls attending Camp Joyzelle. In 1955 a Springdale, Arkansas antiques dealer named Dallas Barrack converted the Club House Hotel into the "Palace Art Galleries". He was to have carried "some of the finest antiques in the area" and believed that "the splendor of the old hotel only adds to their value".

In 1948 W.T. McWhorter purchased the Harvey home and assets, including the amphitheater, and then opened a restaurant he called the Harvey House. His son ran a concession at the amphitheater to cater to the people who still came to see Harvey's deteriorating dream.

In January 1957, the Tulsa Daily World reported that 30,000 tourists visited Monte Ne annually. The Arkansas State Historical Society held its 1960 annual meeting at Monte Ne and gathered at the amphitheater to hear Clara Kennan, a Rogers native and school teacher who had been fascinated by Monte Ne her whole life, give a talk on Harvey and his Pyramid project. Her oral history and interviews provide some of the best information on Harvey and Monte Ne.

== Beaver Lake ==
Discussion of damming the White River for flood control began in the 1930s, and the U.S. Army Corps of Engineers held hearings on building a dam in January 1946. The new dam would create a lake 50 miles (80 km) long, and one arm would extend to Monte Ne. Work on Beaver Dam began in 1960 as the Corps of Engineers impounded and bought land around the White River.

It was required that all cemeteries in the proposed flood zone of the lake be relocated to higher ground. This included the Harvey tomb, which was concrete and weighed 40 tons. The Corps of Engineers contracted with a local house moving company, but their first effort failed. Another contractor with a stronger truck then had to be called in. The tomb was placed on the crest of a hill donated by friends of Harvey. Today, the tomb sits on private property visible from the Monte Ne boat launch on Beaver Lake.

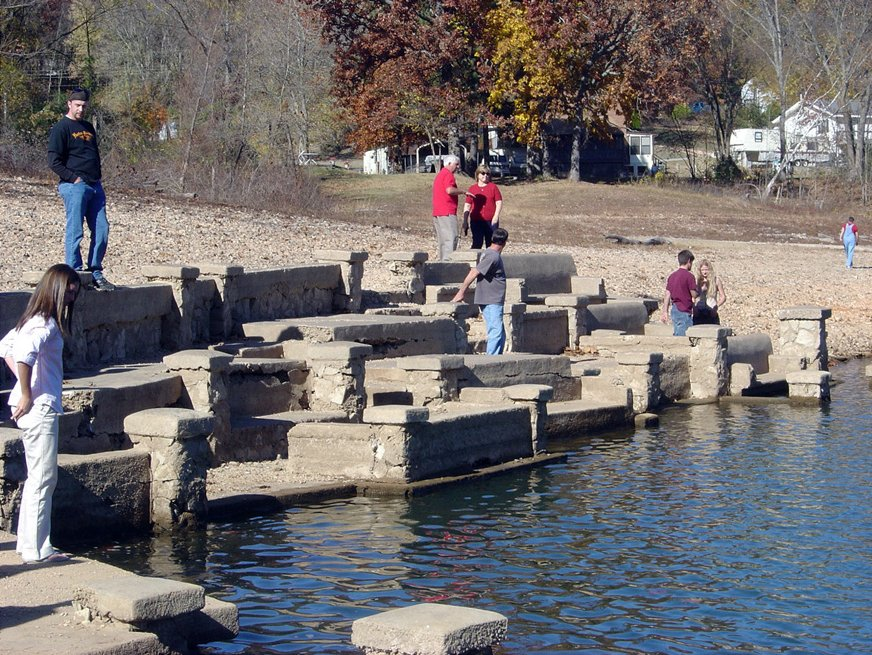
Monte Ne Amphitheater during low lake levels

For years, stories have circulated of a treasure buried within the amphitheater. W.T. McWhorter, the last owner of the amphitheater property, was determined to find out if it was true. He made plans to dynamite the amphitheater on the day before he was to transfer the deed to the Corps of Engineers. Spectators gathered to witness the planned explosion, but it was stopped by the Corps of Engineers just prior to the demolition.

The dam was completed, and Beaver Lake was at full height by June 1966. For all intents and purposes, Harvey's Monte Ne was gone. However, in times of drought, some of the structures become visible again. The lake dropped to its lowest level on January 22, 1977, more than 27 feet (8.2 m) below its average depth, and the amphitheater and bridges were visible for the first time in more than 10 years. In 2006, the waters of Beaver Lake once again receded to their lowest level since 1984, and this generated a new brief interest in Monte Ne and people were once again attracted to the edge of the lake to explore the remains. The upper part of the amphitheater and the retaining wall built for the never constructed pyramid were exposed for a time before being once again swallowed by the lake.

Monte Ne was added to the National Register of Historic Places in 1978 because of the historic significance of being so closely associated with Harvey and its unique architecture and engineering. The application focused mostly on the amphitheater, and on the application section regarding present use there is a small 'x' by 'Other' with the notation "under water".

== Remains ==
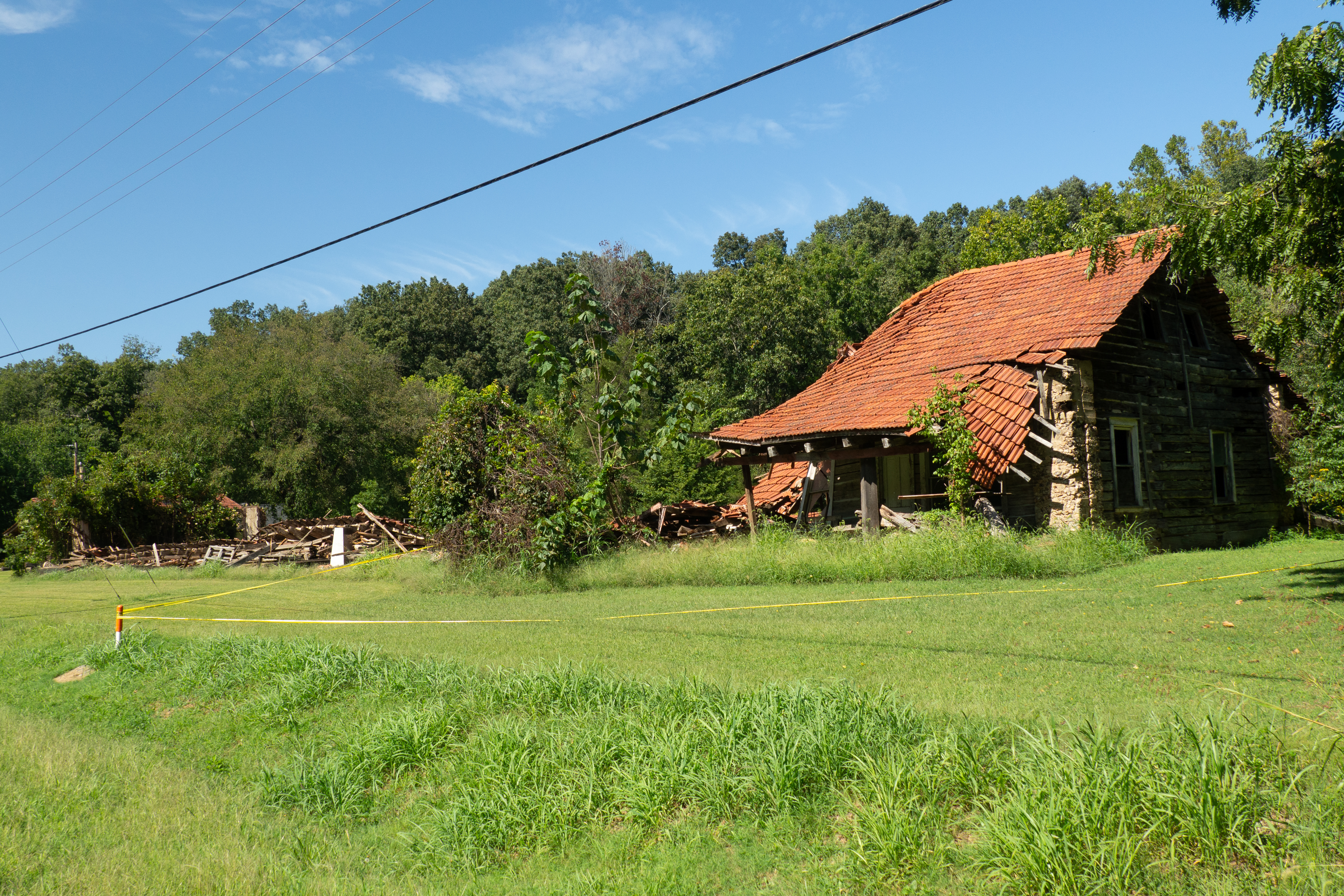
Oklahoma Row finally collapsed in 2023

The most prominent structure remaining after the completion of Beaver Lake was the three-story concrete tower and foundation from the Oklahoma Row. Some efforts were made by the Corps of Engineers to preserve the site, but no plans ever materialized. The tower and foundation were demolished by the Corps of Engineers in 2023, citing ongoing issues with trespassing and vandalism.

A portion of the original log section of Oklahoma Row was removed prior to the flooding and was situated just north of Monte Ne on the east side of Highway 94. This section finally collapsed in a windstorm in 2023.

All that is left of Missouri Row is a four-sided concrete fireplace surrounded by pieces of foundation, and a retaining walls. Other bits of foundation structures can be seen depending on the water level. And, of course, the tomb of William Hope Harvey is visible on the hillside just a short walk from the lake. Two concrete chairs from the amphitheater were removed prior to the flooding and they now reside in the Rogers Historical Museum.
