= Fordyce and Princeton Railroad =

Overview
- Headquarters: Crossett, Arkansas
- Reporting mark: FP
- Locale: Arkansas
- Dates of operation: 1890–2023

Technical
- Track gauge: 4 ft 8 1/2 in (1,435 mm) standard gauge

The Fordyce and Princeton Railroad Company (reporting mark FP) was a short-line railroad headquartered in Crossett, Arkansas.

F&P operated 57 miles (92 km) of line from Fordyce, Arkansas (where it interchanged with Union Pacific), to an interchange with Arkansas, Louisiana and Mississippi Railroad at Crossett.

F&P traffic generally consisted of lumber and paper products.

F&P incorporated on February 25, 1890, as a 9.4-mile (15.1 km) line between Fordyce and Toan, Arkansas. The railroad expanded, then downsized to a mere 1.14 miles (1.83 km) of switching track near Fordyce. After the liquidation of Chicago, Rock Island and Pacific Railroad, F&P acquired the line between Fordyce and Crossett, via Banks, Craney, Hermitage, Ingalls, Vick, Broad, Emery, and Whitlow.

F&P was owned by Georgia Pacific from 1963 until March 2004, when it was sold to Genesee and Wyoming. In 2023, F&P was merged into the Arkansas, Louisiana and Mississippi Railroad's system.
