= Memphis and Little Rock Railroad =

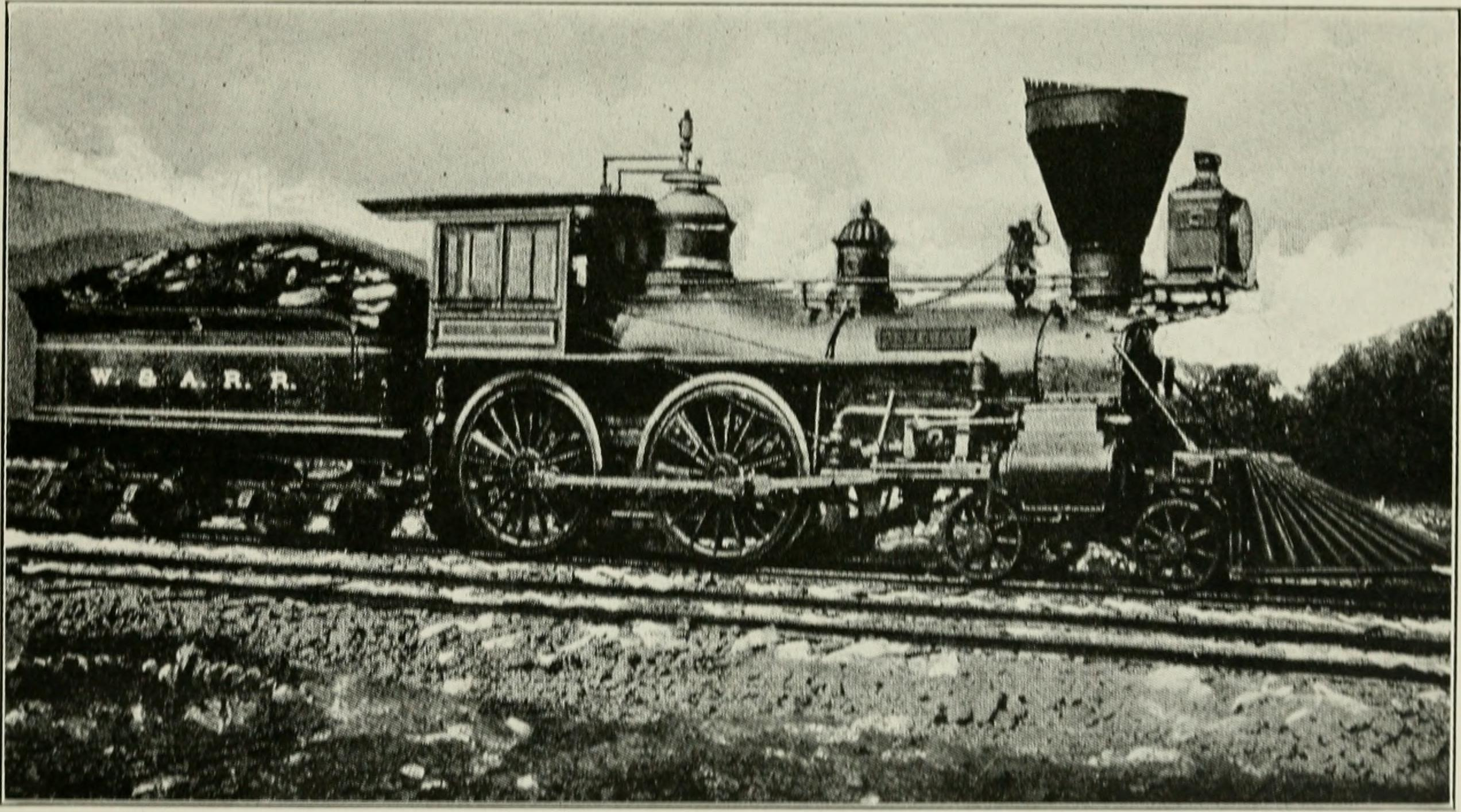
- Civil War era locomotive

Overview
- Locale: Arkansas
- Dates of operation: 1853–1873
- Successor: Chicago, Rock Island and Pacific Railroad

Technical
- Track gauge: 5 ft 6 in (1,676 mm) Indian gauge
- Length: 133 mi (214 km)

The Memphis and Little Rock Railroad was chartered in the U.S. state of Arkansas in 1853. The line ran from Hopefield, Arkansas (now West Memphis) on the east, to Huntersville (now North Little Rock, Arkansas) on the west. The eastern third was completed in 1858 and the western third was built by 1862. During the American Civil War, the Union Army seized control of the line and used the western section to supply its occupation force in Little Rock. The center section was finally completed in 1871. The railroad was subjected to frequent damage from floods and suffered from financial problems. It was sold in 1873, 1877, 1887, 1898, and 1900 before eventually becoming part of the Chicago, Rock Island and Pacific Railroad (Rock Island).

== Pre-war ==
The Memphis and Little Rock Railroad (M&LR) was chartered by the State of Arkansas on January 10, 1853. Construction of the 5 ft 6 in (1.676 m) gauge railroad was estimated to cost $3.2 million. John H. Bradley & Company won the contract to build the line. The survey work began in 1854, but the first track was only laid in 1856 at Hopefield, across the Mississippi River from Memphis, Tennessee. By November 1858, the eastern third of the line was completed from Hopefield to Madison, Arkansas on the St. Francis River. Construction on the western section began in 1861 at Huntersville, across the Arkansas River from Little Rock. By 1862, the western third was completed as far as DeValls Bluff on the White River. Eastbound passengers took steamboats down the White River to Clarendon, Arkansas, where they boarded a stagecoach to Maidson, and later Brinkley, to connect to the eastern section of rail. The railroad, though incomplete in its central section, allowed travelers to go from Little Rock to Memphis an entire day faster than by steamboat alone.

== Civil War ==
During the early part of the Civil War, Confederate soldiers were often transferred to Memphis via the eastern section of the M&LR. The Confederate army also used the railroad's machine shops at Hopefield to modernize rifles. The railroad desired to complete construction of the central section, but the Confederate government was unable to fund the effort. Union troops burned down the railroad shops at Hopefield on February 19, 1863.

The fall of Vicksburg on July 4, 1863, freed enough Federal forces to attempt the conquest of Little Rock. In August 1863, Union Major General Frederick Steele assembled two infantry divisions at Helena, Arkansas while Brigadier General John Wynn Davidson moved south from Missouri with a 6,000-man cavalry division. By August 18, Steele's combined force of 13,000 troops (soon reinforced to 14,500) and 57 artillery pieces reached DeValls Bluff. Confederate Major General Sterling Price defended Little Rock with 7,749 soldiers. After Davidson's cavalry crossed the Arkansas River and defeated the Confederate cavalry in the Battle of Bayou Fourche on September 10, 1863, Price abandoned Little Rock and Steele's troops marched into the city.

Once Steele's Union forces were in occupation of Little Rock, the M&LR became a key link to keep them supplied. Federal steamboats brought supplies up the White River to DeValls Bluff where there was an important depot. From DeValls Bluff the supplies were transported via the M&LR to Little Rock. Confederates launched raids to block the vital railroad, but these were unable to interrupt the supply route for long periods. On July 6, 1864, Confederate partisans managed to derail a train at Hick's Station, while on August 24, 1864, Brigadier General Joseph O. Shelby's raiders succeeded in damaging the railroad at Ashley's Station.

== Post-war ==
On November 1, 1865, control of the M&LR was returned to the railroad company and construction of the central section was undertaken. Much of the existing track had to be relaid and the Hopefield shops rebuilt. In 1868, the state of Arkansas provided $1.2 million to finish its construction. Engineering problems proved especially difficult to overcome in the lowlands between the Cache and L'Anguille Rivers. In 1871, the drawbridge at DeValls Bluff was finished and on April 11, 1871, the last track was completed. A newspaper reporter from New York City who made the trip from Memphis to Little Rock wrote that, "It was the roughest trip you ever saw in your life", and that the train derailed twice. The central and eastern sections were plagued by floods, so that in some places the track was anchored to trees on the upstream side of the roadbed. In the winter and spring, the eastern section was often closed down as impassible.

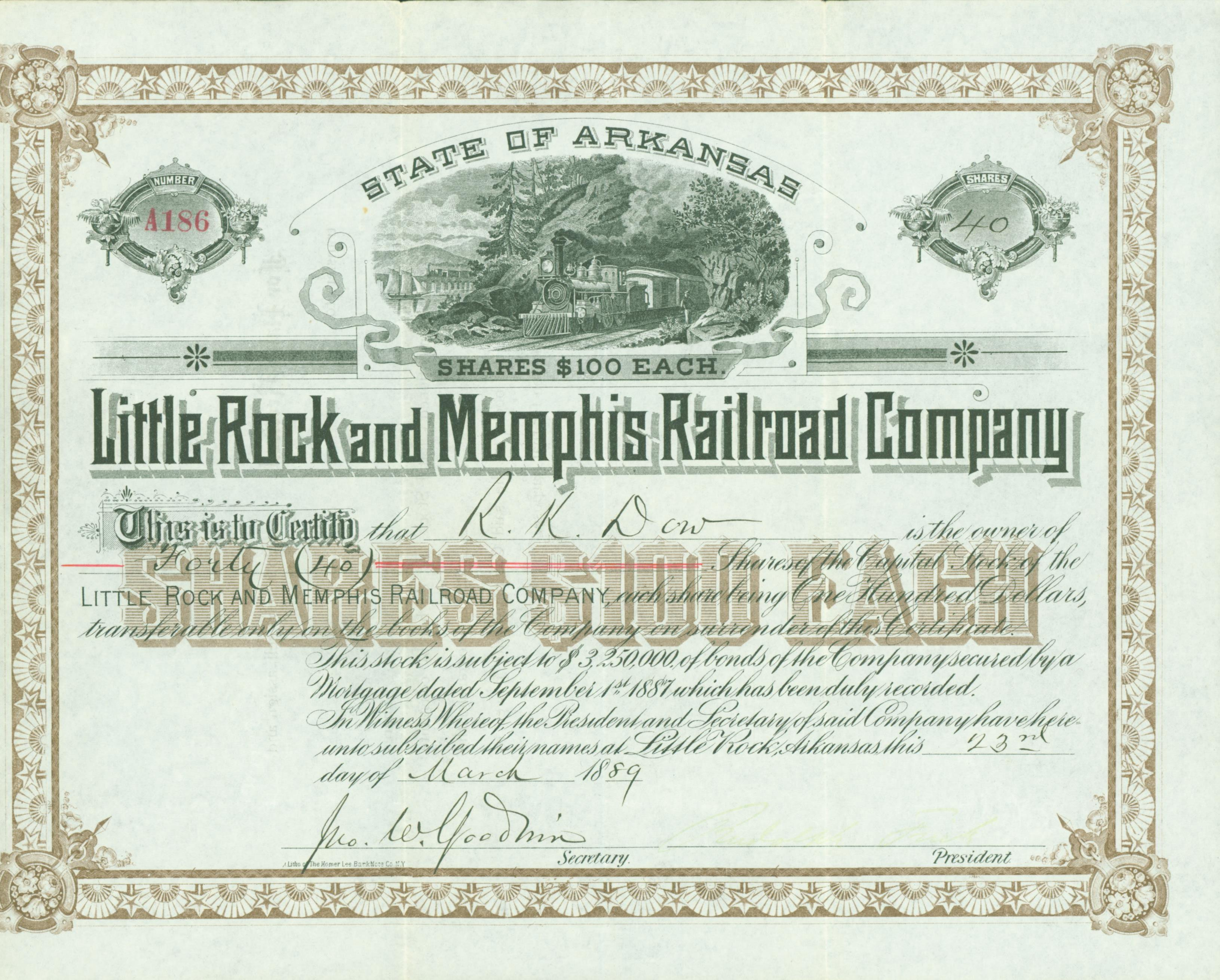
Share of the Little Rock and Memphis Railroad Company, issued 23 March 1889

The railroad defaulted after running into financial trouble, and it was sold to the Memphis and Little Rock Railway in December 1873. Subsequent failures resulted in sale to the Memphis and Little Rock Railroad in 1877 and the Little Rock and Memphis Railroad in 1887. A Mississippi River flood in April 1897 wiped out 40 miles of track in the eastern section. In October 1898, the railroad was sold at foreclosure for only $325,000 to the Choctaw and Memphis Railroad. In 1900, another sale was made to the Choctaw, Oklahoma and Gulf Railroad before it finally ended up as part of the Rock Island.
