= Three Notch Railroad =

Railway line in Alabama, United States

Overview
- Headquarters: Andalusia, Alabama
- Reporting mark: TNHR
- Locale: Southern Alabama
- Dates of operation: 2001–2025
- Predecessor: Alabama and Florida Railway
- Successor: Georgiana and Andalusia Railroad

Technical
- Track gauge: 4 ft 8 1/2 in (1,435 mm) (standard gauge)
- Length: 36 miles (58 km)

The Three Notch Railroad (reporting mark TNHR) and Three Notch Railway (reporting mark TNRW) ran from a connection with CSX Transportation at Georgiana to Andalusia, Alabama, 36 miles (58 km). This short line railroad was created as Three Notch Railroad in 2001. In 2011, it became a subsidiary of Genesee & Wyoming and was renamed Three Notch Railway.

After having been inactive since 2024, the assets of the railroad were bought by Pinsly Railroad Company in 2025, and reopened as Georgiana & Andalusia Railroad in 2026.

Primary commodities did include chemicals, polypropylene, fertilizer, and agricultural products, amounting to 1,050 annual carloads in 2009.

== History ==
The route was built in 1901 as the Alabama and Florida Railroad, consisting of 109 miles (175 km) from Georgiana, Alabama to Graceville, Florida. It was operated by the Louisville & Nashville between 1901–1982 and Seaboard System from 1983 to 1986. The section between Geneva, Alabama, and Graceville was abandoned January 16, 1984. The remaining line between Georgiana and Geneva was purchased by Gulf & Ohio Railways on July 28, 1986, and renamed the Alabama and Florida Railroad. The purchase included the 7.8 miles (12.6 km) Andalusia and Conecuh Railroad from Andalusia to Gantt, Alabama.

The railroad to include 86 miles (138 km) of trackage was purchased by Pioneer Railcorp on November 23, 1992. 36 miles (58 km) of trackage from Georgiana to Andalusia, Alabama was sold back to Gulf & Ohio and named Three Notch railroad on June 11, 2001. This sale included the lease on the Andalusia and Conecuh Railroad. The Alabama and Florida Railway connected with Three Notch Railroad at Andalusia before abandonment of the remaining A&F in 2011.

In April 2011, the Three Notch was named as one of the three railroads to be purchased by RailAmerica from Gulf and Ohio Railways for $12.7 million. RailAmerica was acquired by Genesee & Wyoming in 2012.

In 2024, the railroad shut down after multiple derailments. Genesee & Wyoming quietly slipped out, and Pinsley Railroad Company stepped in, bought it outright and intact, and poured money into the line. After a major investment of ties, rail, resurfacing, and ballast, the railroad reopened in January 2026 as the Georgiana and Andalusia Railroad.
