= Alabama and Florida Railroad =

Alabama and Florida Railroad and Alabama and Florida Railway have been the name of several railroads in the United States:

- Alabama and Florida Railroad (1853–1869), a predecessor to the Louisville and Nashville Railroad which built a line from Pensacola, Florida to Montgomery, Alabama
- Alabama and Florida Railroad (1898–1900), a predecessor to the Louisville and Nashville Railroad which built a line from Georgiana, Alabama to River Falls, Alabama
- Alabama and Florida Railroad (1937–1941), successor to the Alabama, Florida and Gulf Railroad
- Alabama and Florida Railroad (1986–1992), a short-line railroad which operated the Georgiana line 1986–1992
- Alabama and Florida Railway, a short-line railroad which operated the Georgiana line 1992–2011
