= Southern Alabama Railroad =

Railway line in Alabama, United States

Overview
- Headquarters: Troy, Alabama
- Reporting mark: SUAB
- Locale: Southeast Alabama
- Dates of operation: 1988–2001
- Predecessor: Norfolk Southern
- Successor: Conecuh Valley Railroad

Technical
- Track gauge: 4 ft 8 1/2 in (1,435 mm) (standard gauge)
- Length: 15.04 miles (24.20 km)

The Southern Alabama Railroad (reporting mark SUAB) was a shortline railroad formerly operating between a connection with CSX Transportation at Troy to Goshen, Alabama, about 15 miles (24 km). The railroad currently exists as the Conecuh Valley Railroad subsidiary of Gulf and Ohio Railways.

The railroad was controlled by Richard Abernathy, the owner of several shortlines in the South. The Southern Alabama railroad operated only at Troy, with the remainder of the line to Goshen embargoed for the majority of the shortline's operational history.

== History ==
Originally constructed by the Mobile and Girard Railroad (later Central of Georgia) from Columbus to Searight between 1870 - 1891, the line eventually connected with the Louisville and Nashville Railroad at Andalusia, Alabama. The Central of Georgia became part of the Southern Railway in 1963, and the Southern Railway became part of the Norfolk Southern Railway in 1990.

The line between Goshen and Gantt was abandoned September 13, 1982. The segment between Troy and Goshen was then sold to the Abernathy Group on October 31, 1988. Abandonment of the Hurtsboro to Troy portion by Norfolk Southern occurred March 8, 1989, leaving CSX in Troy as the only other railroad connection to the Southern Alabama railroad.

The railroad was sold to Gulf & Ohio Railways and renamed the Conecuh Valley Railroad on November 7, 2001.
