= Conecuh Valley Railroad =

Railway line in Alabama, United States

Conecuh Valley Railway, L.L.C.

Overview
- Headquarters: Troy, Alabama
- Reporting mark: COEH
- Locale: Southeast Alabama
- Dates of operation: 2001–present
- Predecessor: Southern Alabama Railroad

Technical
- Track gauge: 4 ft 8 1/2 in (1,435 mm) (standard gauge)
- Length: 15.04 miles (24.20 km)

The Conecuh Valley Railway, L.L.C. (reporting mark COEH) connects with the CSX at Troy, Alabama, and travels 15.04 miles (24.20 km) to Goshen, Alabama. This short line railroad was created after 2001 from the former Southern Alabama Railroad and is currently owned and operated by Genesee & Wyoming.

Commodities include poultry feed, plastics, vegetable oil, assorted food products, and railcar storage, generating approximately 3,000 annual carloads.

In April 2011, the Conecuh Valley Railway was named as one of the three railroads to be purchased by RailAmerica from Gulf and Ohio for $12.7 million. In 2012, RailAmerica was purchased by Genesee and Wyoming.

== History ==
Originally constructed by the Mobile and Girard Railroad (later Central of Georgia) from Columbus to Searight between 1870 - 1891, the line eventually connected with the Louisville and Nashville Railroad at Andalusia, Alabama. The Central of Georgia became part of the Southern Railway in 1963, and the Southern Railway became part of the Norfolk Southern Railway in 1990.

The remainder of the original Mobile and Girard railroad was sold by the Southern Railway to the Southern Alabama Railroad on October 31, 1988, and was under the control of the Abernathy Group. The line was later sold by the Southern Alabama Railroad to Conecuh Valley Railroad (Gulf & Ohio Railways) on October 22, 2001.

The previous owner, the Southern Alabama Railroad, allowed the line outside of Troy to Goshen to deteriorate to the point that the line was no longer usable. In 2002 it was rehabilitated with funds obtained from the USDA as well as the state in order to restore service to peanut producers in Goshen.

== Locomotives ==
Model	Road number
EMD SW1500	52
EMD SW1500	2241
EMD SW1500	2242
EMD SW1504	1544
EMD GP30	2561
EMD GP30	3069
EMD GP38	3615
EMD GP38	3616
EMD SW9	7013
EMD GP18	9424
