= R.J. Corman Railroad/Pennsylvania Lines =

Overview
- Headquarters: Clearfield, Pennsylvania, U.S.
- Reporting mark: RJCP
- Locale: Central Pennsylvania
- Dates of operation: 1996–

Technical
- Track gauge: 4 ft 8 1/2 in (1,435 mm) standard gauge

R.J. Corman Railroad/Pennsylvania Lines (reporting mark RJCP) is a railroad in the R.J. Corman Railroad Group, operating a number of lines in central Pennsylvania. It primarily carries coal between mines and Norfolk Southern Railway connections at Cresson and Keating. The trackage was acquired from Conrail in 1996, when the latter company sold its "Clearfield Cluster"; Norfolk Southern acquired nearby Conrail lines in 1999. This is the longest R.J. Corman owned line, at over 300 miles in length.

== History ==
RJCP trackage includes lines formerly owned by the Pennsylvania Railroad (from the Cambria and Clearfield Railway), New York Central Railroad (through its Beech Creek Railroad and Beech Creek Extension Railroad subsidiaries), and the jointly-controlled Cherry Tree and Dixonville Railroad.

The company came under common control with the 1968 creation of the Penn Central Transportation Company, and passed to Conrail in 1976, which decided to sell the lines, which it called the "Clearfield Cluster", in 1995. RJCP began operating them on January 2, 1996. The sale included the following lines, as well as a number of other branches:

- Cresson (on Conrail's Pittsburgh Line) to Mahaffey (ex-PRR)
- Cresson to Flinton (ex-PRR)
- Mahaffey to Cherry Tree (ex-NYC)
- Cherry Tree to Dixonville (ex-CT&D)
- Mahaffey to Curwensville (ex-NYC)
- Clearfield to Keating (on Conrail's Buffalo Line) (ex-NYC)
- Clearfield to Wallaceton (ex-NYC)
- Wallaceton to Osceola Mills (ex-PRR): abandonment authorized in 2001

Between Curwensville and Clearfield, Conrail operated via trackage rights over the Clearfield and Mahoning Railway (C&M), subsidiary of the Buffalo and Pittsburgh Railroad (B&P), which had acquired it from CSX Transportation. B&P operations were terminated in 1992, when the line west of Curwensville was abandoned, and Conrail acquired control of the C&M in a late 1992-early 1993 swap, where the B&P acquired an isolated Conrail line for operation as Bradford Industrial Rail. Conrail sold the C&M to Richard J. Corman, owner of RJCP, effective January 26, 1996, and it remains a non-operating subsidiary.

=== Trail to Rails ===
In May 2012, the Surface Transportation Board granted the railroad permission to reclaim 20 miles of track in Clarence, Pennsylvania abandoned by Conrail in 1993, 10 miles which had been converted into the Snow Shoe Rails to Trails. The decision was a major victory for both the company and the railroad industry in general, as there are few instances in the U.S. where an abandoned corridor-turned-rail trail has reverted to an active railroad. However, eventually, the decision fell through, and the line remains abandoned to this day.
