= Andalusia and Conecuh Railroad =

Railway line in Alabama, United States

Overview
- Headquarters: Gantt, Alabama
- Reporting mark: ACRC
- Locale: Southeast Alabama
- Dates of operation: 1983–1987
- Predecessor: Southern
- Successor: Alabama and Florida

Technical
- Track gauge: 4 ft 8 1/2 in (1,435 mm) (standard gauge)
- Length: 8.7 miles (14.0 km)

The Andalusia and Conecuh Railroad (reporting mark ACRC) was a shortline railroad formerly operating between Gantt and Andalusia, Alabama, United States 8.7 miles (14.0 km). It was largely abandoned in 1987, with the remainder leased to the Alabama and Florida Railway. A portion of the railroad survives today as part of the Three Notch Railroad.

== History ==
Originally constructed by the Mobile and Girard Railroad (later Central of Georgia) from Columbus to Searight by 1891, the line was eventually realigned near Gantt to connect with the Louisville and Nashville Railroad at Andalusia, Alabama. The Central of Georgia became part of the Southern Railway in 1963, and the Southern Railway became part of the Norfolk Southern Railway in 1990.

Much of the former Mobile and Girard route was abandoned or sold throughout the 1980s, with the segment between Goshen and Gantt being abandoned on September 13, 1982. The Andalusia & Conecuh railroad began operations in June 1983 and was owned by the Alabama Electric Cooperative. Traffic consisted of inbound coal for the power plant at Gantt as well as plastics and chemicals for a carpet mill near Andalusia. Interchange was made with the Seaboard System (later CSX) at Andalusia. The railroad rostered a single GE 80t locomotive.

The railroad was mostly abandoned on December 4, 1987, with approximately 2 miles (3.2 km) still in place near Andalusia operated by the Alabama & Florida railway. In 2001 the Three Notch Railroad took control of the lease on the A&C railroad and began operating the line.
