= Austin Western Railroad =

Short-line railroad near Austin, TX

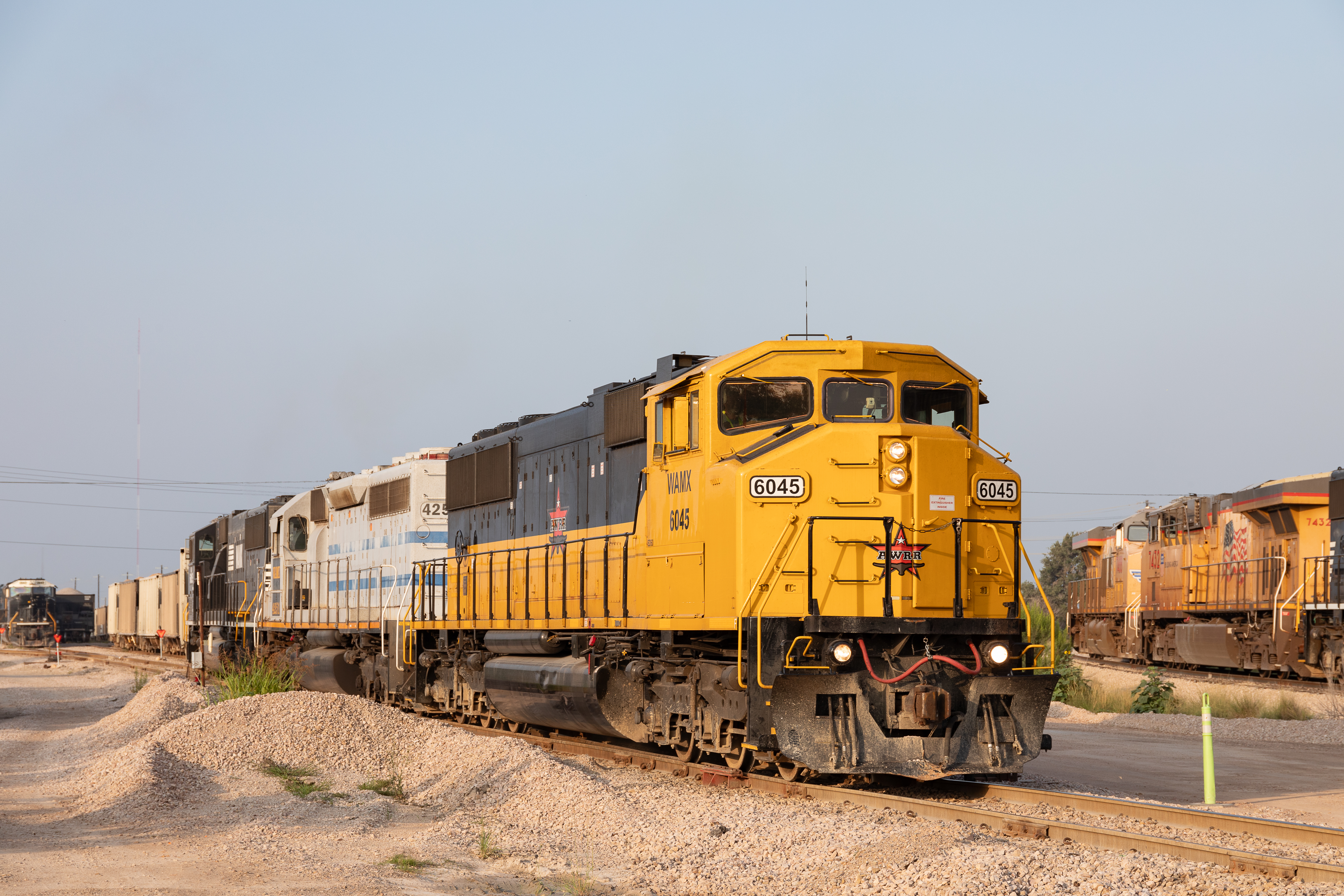
- An Austin Western train departs Burnet, Texas

Overview
- Headquarters: Round Rock, Texas
- Reporting mark: AWRR
- Locale: Texas
- Dates of operation: 2007–

Technical
- Track gauge: 4 ft 8 1/2 in (1,435 mm) standard gauge
- Length: 154 miles (248 km)

Other
- Website: www.watco.com/service/rail/austin-western-railroad-awrr/

The Austin Western Railroad (reporting mark AWRR) is a Class III short-line railroad headquartered in Round Rock, Texas. AWRR is a subsidiary of Watco. It is the contracted operator of 126 miles (203 km) of ex-Southern Pacific trackage, now owned by Capital Metropolitan Transportation Authority. AWRR operates the line from Fairland, Texas to Giddings, Texas, in addition to 6.4 miles (10.3 km) of branchline from Fairland to Marble Falls, Texas. Another 28 miles (45 km) of track remain out of service between Fairland and Llano, having most recently seen revenue service in 2005. This portion comprises the Austin and Northwestern Railroad Historic District.

The AWRR shares trackage with the CapMetro Rail Red Line between Leander and Austin. It interchanges with the Union Pacific and BNSF Railway; both at McNeil, Texas. Two other interchanges exist at Elgin and Giddings, but are not in service as of 2026.

The Austin Steam Train Association (ASTA) operates excursion trains over the AWRR's trackage between Cedar Park and Burnet.

As of April 2026, AWRR employees are unionized through the Brotherhood of Locomotive Engineers & Trainmen (BLET) division of the Teamsters.

== History ==
The Austin Western Railroad was founded in 2007, with Watco winning the bid to operate the line after the Austin Area Terminal Railroad's contract with Capital Metro ended.

In 2015, BNSF named AWRR its "shortline of the year."

In 2024, Austin Western began to install distributed power (DPU) systems in some of its locomotives. While DPU systems are common on Class I railroads, AWRR is one of the only Class III shortline railroads to use the system.

== Traffic ==
AWRR moves nearly 60,000 carloads a year. Traffic includes aggregates, crushed limestone, recycling, calcium bicarbonate, lumber, beer, chemicals, plastics and paper.

An incomplete list of AWRR customers, as of July 2025:

Industry	Commodity	City
Capitol Aggregates - Delta Materials/Pugmill	Aggregates	Marble Falls, TX
Lhoist Marble Falls	Aggregates	Marble Falls, TX
Heidelberg Materials Aggregates	Aggregates	Marble Falls, TX
Guthrie Lumbie & Distribution	Lumber	Cedar Park, TX
Builders FirstSource	Lumber	Cedar Park, TX
ICU Medical	Medical Devices	Austin, TX
Balcones Resources	Recycling	Austin, TX
Tex Mix Concrete	Aggregates	Austin, TX
Texas Materials - Manor Terminal	Aggregates	Manor, TX
Plains States Commodities	Fertilizer	Elgin, TX
Texas Materials - Giddings Terminal	Aggregates	Giddings, TX

== Roster ==
As of February 2026
Road Number	Model	Lineage	Livery	Rostered
GMTX 3407	EMD SD45T-2	ex-SP	Oldcastle Materials Texas green+black	2016-
GMTX 3408	EMD SD45T-2	ex-SP	Oldcastle Materials Texas green+black	2016-
WAMX 4143	EMD SD40-2	ex-BN	Watco black+yellow	2011-
WAMX 4144	EMD SD40-2	ex-BN	Watco black+yellow	2011-
WAMX 4145	EMD SD40-2	ex-BN	Watco black+yellow	2011-
WAMX 4146	EMD SD40-2	ex-BN	Watco black+yellow	2011-
WAMX 4226	EMD SD40	ex-SP	Watco black+yellow	
WAMX 4228	EMD SD40-2	ex-BCOL	Watco black+yellow	
WAMX 4229	EMD SD40-2	ex-BN	Watco black+yellow	
WAMX 4249	EMD SD40-2	ex-UP	Oldcastle Materials Texas green+yellow+gray	2014-
WAMX 4251	EMD SD40M-2	ex-SP	Patched CIT gray	2019-
WAMX 4252	EMD SD40M-2	ex-ATSF	Patched CIT gray	2019-
WAMX 4276	EMD SD40-2	ex-BN	Patched Helm maroon	
WAMX 4277	EMD SD40-2	ex-BN	Patched Helm blue	
WAMX 6013	EMD SD60M	ex-NS	Patched NS horsehead	2019-
WAMX 6014	EMD SD60M	ex-NS	Patched NS horsehead	2019-
WAMX 6015	EMD SD60M	ex-NS	Patched NS horsehead	2019-
WAMX 6016	EMD SD60	ex-CNW	Watco black+yellow	2021-
WAMX 6017	EMD SD60	ex-CNW	Watco black+yellow	2021-
WAMX 6018	EMD SD60	ex-CNW	Watco black+yellow	2021-
WAMX 6036	EMD SD60M	ex-UP	Watco black+yellow with AWRR logos	2022-
WAMX 6037	EMD SD60M	ex-UP	Watco black+yellow with AWRR logos	2022-
WAMX 6038	EMD SD60M	ex-UP	Watco black+yellow with AWRR logos	2022-
WAMX 6039	EMD SD60M	ex-UP	Watco black+yellow with AWRR logos	2022-
WAMX 6040	EMD SD60M	ex-UP	Watco black+yellow with AWRR logos	2023-
WAMX 6041	EMD SD60M	ex-UP	Watco black+yellow with AWRR logos	2022-
WAMX 6045	EMD SD60M	ex-UP	Watco black+yellow with AWRR logos	2024-
