= Gulf and Ohio Railways =

American railroad holding company

Gulf & Ohio Railways
- Industry: Rail Transport
- Founded: 1985
- Founder: Pete Claussen
- Headquarters: Knoxville, Tennessee
- Area served: Southern United States
- Website: www.gulfandohio.com

Gulf & Ohio Railways is a holding company for four different short-line railroads in the Southern United States, as well as a tourist-oriented passenger train, and locomotive leasing and repair service through Knoxville Locomotive Works. Gulf & Ohio maintains its corporate headquarters in Knoxville, Tennessee.

The company owns railroads carrying a wide variety of commodities, generating around 40,000 annual carloads over approximately 225 miles of track.

== History ==
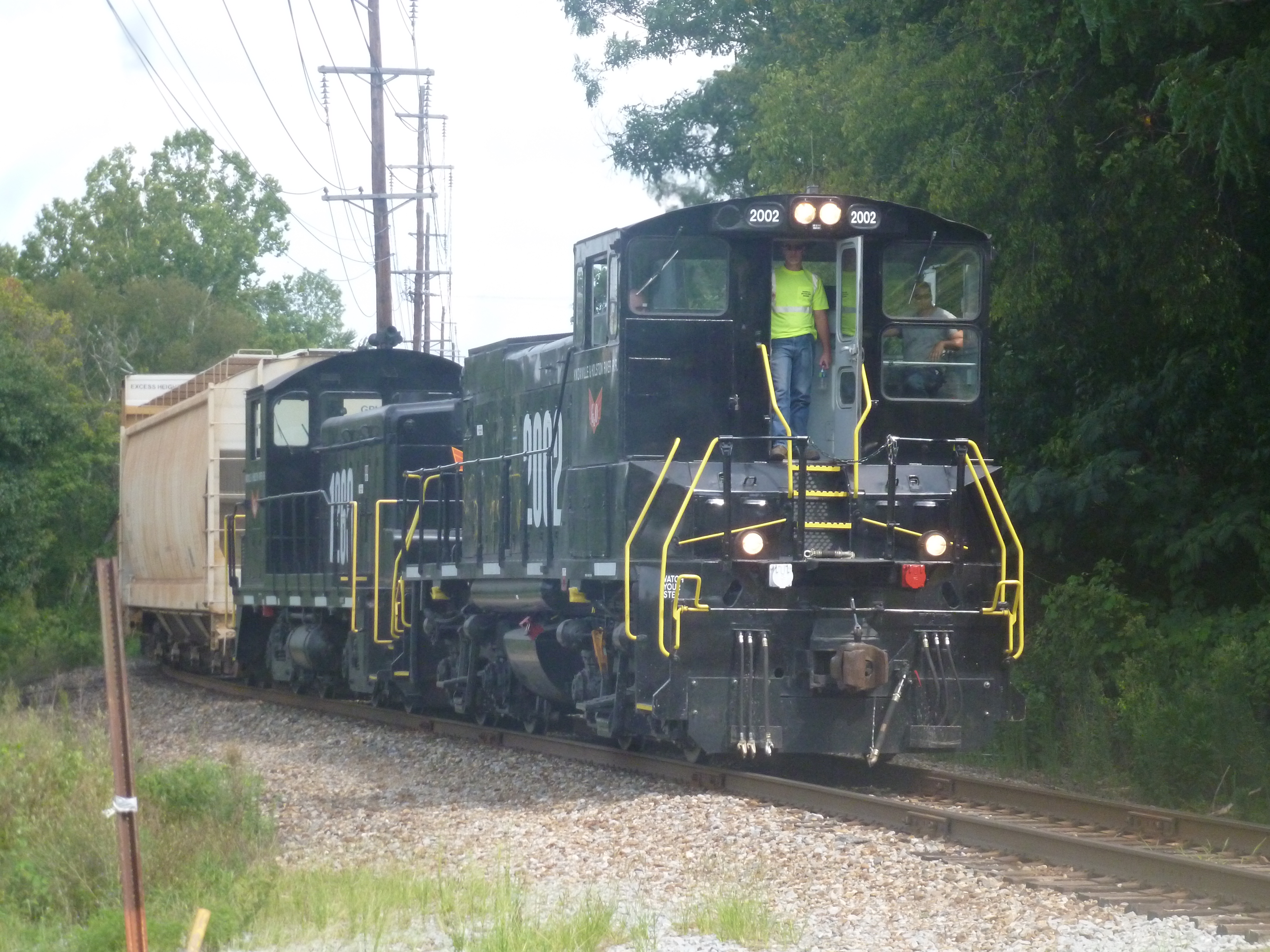
Knoxville and Holston River Railroad MP15AC #2002 leads a train through Tyson Park near downtown Knoxville.

Gulf & Ohio Railways was founded by Pete Claussen concurrent with the start up of the first G&O shortline, the Mississippi Delta Railroad in 1985. The Alabama & Florida and Wiregrass Central soon followed as the next additions to the Gulf & Ohio network, beginning operations in 1986 and 1987 respectively.

=== Expansion ===
The company continued modest expansion throughout the 1990s, acquiring new railroads in Alabama, Georgia, Florida, North Carolina, Tennessee, and Kentucky. These new additions included the Atlantic & Gulf in 1991, the H&S in 1992, the Nash County Railroad in 1994, and the Georgia & Florida in 1995. Also in 1994, Gulf & Ohio would further expand its presence in North Carolina by acquiring both the Yadkin Valley Railroad and Laurinburg & Southern. Growth continued with the acquisition in 1996 of the Lexington & Ohio in Kentucky and expansion into Tennessee with the Knoxville & Holston River Railroad in 1998.

The 1990s also saw the sale and transfer of some G&O lines to other operators, including the Alabama & Florida railroad on November 23, 1992, to Pioneer Railcorp, and on April 30, 1999, Gulf & Ohio sold two of its railroads to North American RailNet, which combined both—the Atlantic & Gulf and the Georgia & Florida—into a single entity, Georgia & Florida Railnet. This sale effectively ended the G&O presence in Florida, as well as ending their presence in Georgia until 2003.

=== Continuing Changes ===
In June 2001 Gulf & Ohio terminated operations on the Mississippi Delta railroad as the line was turned over to local interests - ending the G&O presence in Mississippi. During the same period, the Three Notch Railroad began operations over part of the Alabama & Florida regained by Gulf & Ohio after being sold in 1992. Also in 2001, the Southern Alabama Railroad was acquired and renamed the Conecuh Valley Railroad.

2003 brought additional changes to Gulf & Ohio, including the creation of the Chattahoochee & Gulf Railroad from former Norfolk Southern tracks in March concurrent with the sale of the Lexington & Ohio to R.J. Corman Railroad Company. In 2005, Gulf & Ohio began operating the Morehead & South Fork at the port of Morehead City, North Carolina.

=== Recent History ===
In 2006 Gulf & Ohio sold the H&S and the Chattahoochee & Gulf railroads to shortline operator Genesee & Wyoming Inc. Both divisions were subsequently consolidated into a single operation, the Chattahoochee Bay Railroad. On February 1, 2010, the lease on the Morehead & South Fork was acquired by the Carolina Coastal Railway and was no longer operated by Gulf & Ohio.

Knoxville became the center of Gulf & Ohio operations, with a locomotive shop, corporate headquarters, and special tourist excursions all based in the city. The company's corporate headquarters are located in the restored James Park House in the city's downtown area. The company continued to acquire and sell subsidiary railroads, with its presence eventually contained to three states; Alabama, North Carolina, and Tennessee.

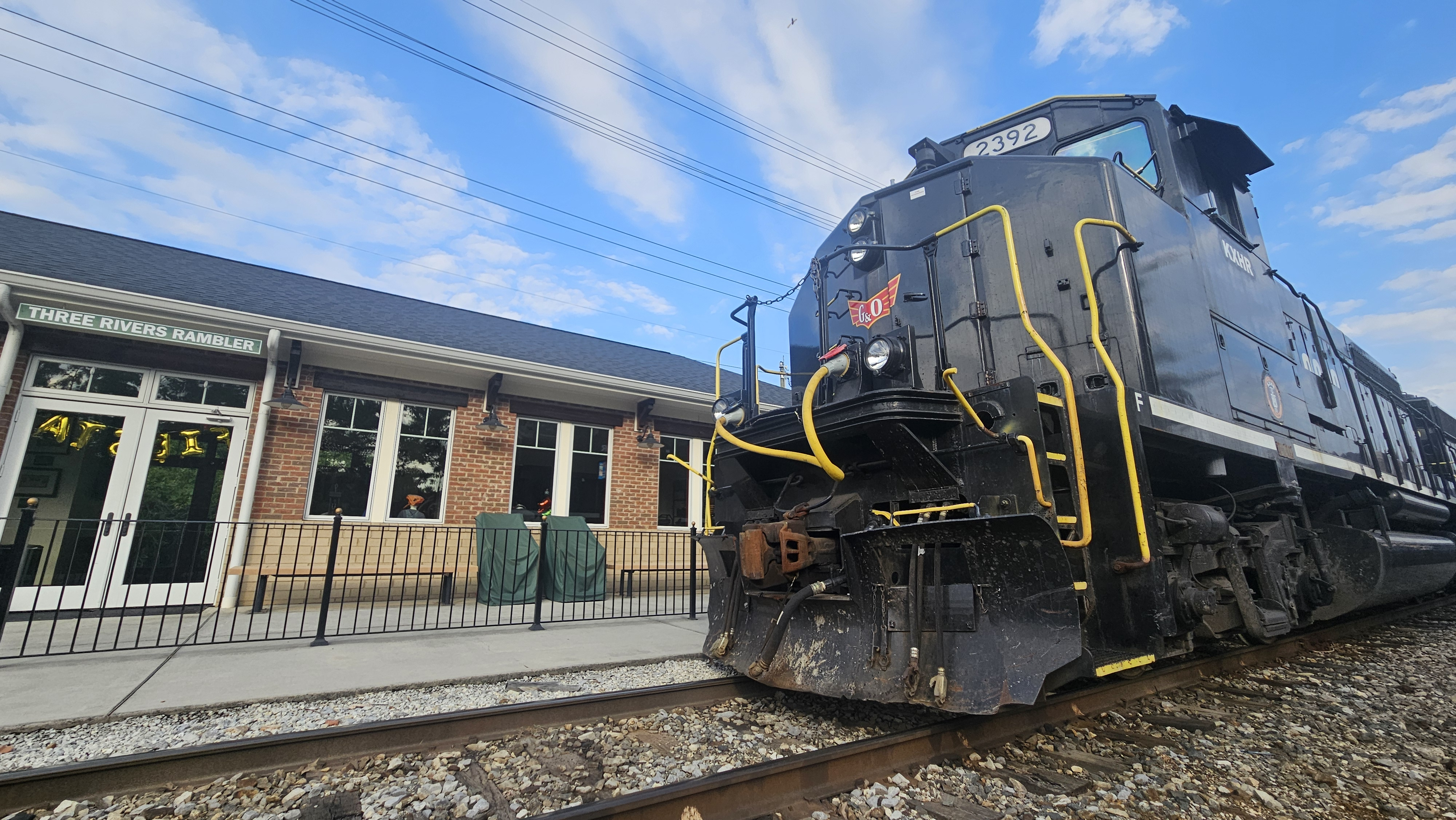
A GP40-2LW sets parked near the KXHR Station near University Commons Shopping Center in Knoxville.

Gulf & Ohio extended its presence into South Carolina in November 2010 with the acquisition of the Lancaster and Chester Railway, an independent railroad. In April 2011, RailAmerica announced its plans to purchase three Gulf & Ohio subsidiaries in Alabama for $12.7 million. If successful, it would end the Gulf & Ohio presence in the state. That sale was completed in 2011, and the Nash County Railroad was sold to the CLNA in 2011 as well, and continues operations under the CLNA mark.

In 2016, G&O leased a railroad it coined the Kinston & Snow Hill Railroad from N.C. Department of Transportation (NCDOT) to serve a 2,500 acre industrial park in Kinston, North Carolina. It moved the Lancaster and Chester EMD SW900 to the new operation, but revenue freight proved erratic at best. In 2022, the lease was transferred to Kinston Railroad (KNR), a wholly owned subsidiary of Jaguar Transport Holdings.

== Livery ==
Initially each subsidiary railroad had its own stylized herald for the cab section and short hood. However the early railroads shared a bright red paint scheme and distinctive large white unit numbers applied near the end of the long hood. Further development of the paint scheme brought about a common logo in the form of a simple black circular herald with a yellow border. The new logo was placed below the cab windows and featured a stylized version of the railroad name and initials within.

Concurrent with the 1995 acquisition of the Georgia & Florida railroad, the company changed its color scheme from bright red with road specific stylized logos to a flat black color featuring the corporate logo. The iconic large white numbers on the long hood remained, although they were now placed closer to the center as opposed to the end. With the influx of flat black GP10 locomotives from the Illinois Central and GP38s from Norfolk Southern, it became uneconomical to repaint all of the new additions red. Furthermore, due to the frequent transfer of locomotives between different subsidiaries the corporate logo appeared with the railroad name in plain text featured either above or below the logo to simplify the process of re-lettering locomotives as they moved to a different property.

== Holdings ==
- Three Rivers Rambler (steam powered tourist operation)
- Knoxville and Holston River Railroad
- Lancaster and Chester Railway
- Laurinburg and Southern Railroad
- Yadkin Valley Railroad

== Former holdings ==
- Alabama and Florida Railroad
- Atlantic and Gulf Railroad
- Chattahoochee and Gulf Railroad
- Georgia and Florida Railroad
- H and S Railroad (formerly Hartford and Slocomb Railroad)
- Kinston & Snow Hill Railroad
- Lexington and Ohio
- Mississippi Delta Railroad
- Morehead and South Fork Railroad
- Three Notch Railroad
