= List of reporting marks: H =

Note: Marks ending in U are for container owners; marks ending in X are not common carriers; marks ending in Z are for trailers without flanged wheels. All other marks are of common-carrier railroads.

== H ==
- HABX - Habco International, Inc.
- HALX - Holland American Line - Westours, Inc.
- HAMU - Costa Line
- HANU - Hansa Line
- HANX - L. Hansen's Forwarding
- HAPX - Helm-Atlantic Leasing, LLP
- HARX - GE Rail Services Corporation
- HATU - H A T Enterprises, Inc.
- HATX - Helm Financial Corporation
- HATZ - H A T Enterprises, Inc.
- HB - Hampton and Branchville Railroad
- HBGX - Hillsboro Bottled Gas Company, HBG Enterprises of Tampa, Inc.
- HBL - Harbor Belt Line
- HBRY - Hudson Bay Railway (OmniTRAX)
- HBT - Houston Belt and Terminal Railway
- HBWX - Georgia Power Company
- HCBX - Chevron Phillips Chemical Company
- HCCX - Hercules Cement Company
- HCDU - ER Nahrungsmittel GmBH and Company KG
- HCGX - North American Salt Company
- HCIU - Steam Packet Yard
- HCLX - HIMONT Canada, Inc., Basell Canada, Inc.
- HCMX - Harnischfeger Corporation
- HCPX - Occidental Chemical Corporation (Hooker Industrial and Specialty Chemicals)
- HCRC - Hillsdale County Railway
- HCRR - Honey Creek Railroad
- HCRY - Huron Central Railway
- HCSX - Helm Chesapeake, LLP
- HCTX - Hallett Construction Company, Martin Marietta Corporation
- HCYR - Horry County Railway
- HDM - Hudson and Manhattan
- HDMU - Hyundai Merchant Marine (America), Inc.
- HDMZ - Hyundai Merchant Marine (America), Inc.
- HDSX - RailAmerica Equipment Corporation
- HE - Hollis and Eastern Railroad
- HECX - Hoosier Energy REC, Inc.
- HELX - Helm Financial Corporation
- HENU - Provincial Trailer Rentals
- HENZ - Provincial Trailer Rentals
- HEPX - Ontario Hydro, Hydro One
- HEQX - Helm Financial Corporation
- HERX - GE Rail Services Corporation
- HESR - Huron and Eastern Railway
- HESU - Heritage Environmental Services, Inc.
- HESX - Heritage Environmental Services, Inc.
- HESZ - Heritage Environmental Services, Inc.
- HFPX - General American Transportation Corporation
- HGCX - Hillsboro Glass Company
- HGIU - Hub Group
- HGPX - Harrison Gypsum Company
- HHCX - Huntsman LLC
- HHEX - H and H Engineering Construction, Inc.
- HHHX - Public Service Company of Colorado
- HHLX - H and H Locomotive Leasing, Inc.
- HI - Holton Interurban Railway
- HIIX - Hamburg Industries, TTX Company (Hamburg Division)
- HIMX - Heppner Iron and Metal Company
- HINX - Heritage Inks International Corporation
- HIPX - Reliant Energy HL and P
- HJBX - H.J. Baker and Brothers, Inc.
- HJCU - HANJIN Container Lines, Ltd.
- HJCZ - HANJIN Container Lines, Ltd.
- HJPX - Larsen Farms
- HJVX - Helm Financial Corporation
- HKGU - Hong Kong Islands Line
- HKGX - Haines & Kibblehouse Inc., The H&K Group
- HKIU - Hong Kong Islands Line
- HKPU - Hong Kong Islands Line
- HKRX - PNC Equipment Finance, LLC
- HKTU - Hong Kong Islands Line
- HKUU - Hong Kong Islands Line
- HKZZ - Hong Kong Islands Line
- HLBZ - Hill Brothers Transportation
- HLCU - Hapag-Lloyd, AG
- HLCX - Helm Leasing Company
- HLEX - Huntsman Polymers Corporation
- HLGX - Helm Financial Corporation
- HLLX - Helm Financial Corporation
- HLMX - Helm Financial Corporation
- HLNE - Hillsboro and North Eastern Railway
- HLPX - Houston Lighting and Power Company
- HLSC - Hampton Railway
- HLTX - Amoco Oil Company
- HMAX - Huntsman Petrochemical
- HMCR - Huntsville and Madison County Railroad
- HMCX - HoltraChem Manufacturing Company, LLC
- HMFX - Florida Rock Industries, Inc.
- HMIX - Henkels and McCoy
- HMJX - Helm Financial Corporation
- HMR - Hoboken Manufacturers
- HMWX - Heckett MultiServ
- HN - Hutchinson and Northern Railway
- HNPU - Navale Et Commerciale Havraise Penninsulaire
- HNW - Hamilton Northwestern Railroad
- HOCU - Hoegh Container Lines
- HOCX - Head-On Collision Line
- HOEU - Hoechst Aktiengesellschaft
- HOG - Heart of Georgia Railroad
- HOGX - Union Pacific Railroad
- HOKX - Hooker Chemical; Occidental Chemical Corporation (Hooker Industrial and Specialty Chemicals)
- HOMX - Home Oil Company, Ltd., PLM International, Inc.
- HONX - Honeymead Products Company (Division of Harvest States Cooperatives)
- HOS - Hoosier Southern Railroad
- HOSC - Indiana and Eastern Railroad (The Hoosier Connection); Pennsylvania Railroad; Penn Central; Conrail; Norfolk Southern (after Conrail breakup)
- HOTX - Chicago Freight Car Leasing Company
- HOWZ - Flex-Van Leasing
- HOYU - Hoyer GMBH Internationale
- HPAX - Hammermill Paper Company, International Paper
- HPCX - Hercules, Inc.
- HPIX - HIMONT USA, Inc., Besell USA, Inc.
- HPJX - Helm-Pacific Leasing
- HPLX - Exxon Company, Exxon-Mobil Corporation
- HPPX - Huntsman Polypropylene Corporation
- HPTD - High Point, Thomasville and Denton Railroad
- HPTU - Highway Pipeline
- HRCX - Heritage Railcar
- HRDL - Hudson River Day Line
- HRDX - Silver Star Enterprises, Inc.
- HREX - Heavy Railroad Excavations, Inc.
- HRLU - Hudson Railway Equipment Company (Division of Hudson Leasing Company)
- HRLZ - Hudson Railway Equipment Company
- HROX - Lehigh Hanson, Inc. (construction aggregate producer)
- HRRC - Housatonic Railroad
- HRRX - Conrail, On-Track Railcar Services, Inc.
- HRS - Hollidaysburg and Roaring Spring Railroad
- HRSX - Harbor Rail Services of California, Inc.
- HRT - Hartwell Railroad
- HS - Housatonic Southern, Hartford and Slocomb Railroad, H and S Railroad
- HSCX - Steel Wheels, Ltd.
- HSFZ - Atchison, Topeka and Santa Fe Railway
- HSIX - Housing Starts, Inc.
- HSLU - Haulage Services, Ltd.
- HSRR - Hardin Southern Railroad
- HSRZ - H and S Railroad
- HSW - Helena Southwestern Railroad
- HTCX - Transportation Corporation of America, GE Rail Services Corporation
- HTMU - Hansen and Tidemann, Inc.
- HTSU - High Tech Transport, Ltd.
- HTSX - Herzog Transit Services, Inc.
- HTTX - Trailer Train Company, TTX Corporation
- HTW - Hoosac Tunnel and Wilmington
- HUBA - Hudson Bay, Burlington Northern and Santa Fe Railway; BNSF Railway
- HUDX - Hudson Technologies, Inc.
- HUKU - Huktra (UK), Ltd.
- HUNX - Huntting Elevator Company
- HUTX - Hutchinson Transportation Company
- HWCX - Halliburton Company
- HWPX - Hiram Walker and Sons, Inc.
- HYDX - Union Carbide Corporation, Praxair, Inc.
- HYWX - Georgia Power Company
- HZGX - Herzog Contracting Corporation
