= Hartford and Slocomb Railroad =

Overview
- Headquarters: Hartford, Alabama
- Reporting mark: HS
- Locale: Southeast Alabama
- Dates of operation: 1953–1992
- Predecessor: Central of Georgia
- Successor: H and S Railroad

Technical
- Track gauge: 4 ft 8 1/2 in (1,435 mm) standard gauge
- Length: 22 miles (35 km)

The Hartford & Slocomb Railroad (reporting mark HS) was a shortline railroad operating 22 miles (35 km) of track from Dothan to Hartford, Alabama. Largely abandoned in 1992, the remaining tracks from Dothan to Taylor were sold to Gulf and Ohio Railways and operated as the H and S Railroad. The railroad was purchased by Genesee & Wyoming Railroad in 2006, after which it was combined with a neighboring property, the Chattahoochee and Gulf Railroad to form the Chattahoochee Bay Railroad.

== History ==
In 1900 the Chattahoochee and Gulf Railroad completed the constructed of a line from Columbia to Lockhart, Alabama. The railroad was leased and operated by the Central of Georgia Railroad until the line was abandoned from Lockhart to Hartford in 1940. The Hartford & Slocomb railroad purchased the remaining portion from Dothan to Hartford on August 1, 1953 and began operations on February 16, 1954. The Itel Corporation purchased the railroad in July 1975.

On April 29, 1992 16 miles (26 km) of the railroad was abandoned between Taylor and Hartford. The remainder was sold to Gulf & Ohio, operating as the H and S Railroad until August 30, 2006 when it was once again sold, this time to the Genesee & Wyoming Railroad. Operations were merged with the Chattahoochee and Gulf Railroad and are operated as a single railroad.
