= Alab =

Alab or ALAB may mean the following:

- Alabama Railroad, a former American railroad (reporting mark ALAB)
- Mount Alab, a mountain in Malaysia
- Alab Pilipinas, a basketball team in the Philippines
- "Alab (Burning)", a 2018 single by SB19
