= Meridian Southern Railway =

East Mississippi, USA railroad

Overview
- Headquarters: Owego, New York
- Reporting mark: MDS
- Locale: Mississippi
- Dates of operation: 2001–

Technical
- Track gauge: 4 ft 8 1/2 in (1,435 mm) standard gauge

Founded in 2001, Meridian Southern Railway (reporting mark MDS), in east Mississippi, USA, is a 55 miles (89 km) short line freight railroad linking Meridian, and Waynesboro, Mississippi and intermediate stations. The railroad is connected to the national rail network by its connection to the CPKC Railway at Meridian. The MDS utilizes five General Electric built B23-7 locomotives to move over 7,000 carloads of freight annually.

Originally, this line was part of the Mobile and Ohio Railroad mainline connecting Mobile, Alabama with St. Louis, Missouri. The segment between Waynesboro and Mobile has been abandoned.

At one time MDS was affiliated with the Owego Harford Railway, the Lehigh Railway, and the Luzerne and Susquehanna Railway), all part of a holding company headquartered in Owego, New York. The other three lines were sold to R.J. Corman Railroad Group in August 2020, leaving MDS as the sole remaining operation.
