= Kinston and Snow Hill Railroad =

Short-line railroad in Kinston, North Carolina

Overview
- Parent company: Gulf and Ohio Railways
- Locale: Kinston, North Carolina
- Dates of operation: 2016–2022
- Successor: Kinston Railroad

Technical
- Track gauge: 4 ft 8 1/2 in (1,435 mm)
- Length: 5.7 mi (9.2 km)

Other
- Website: jag-transport.com/kinston-railroad/

The Kinston and Snow Hill Railroad was a short-line railroad in Kinston, North Carolina. The railroad operates a 5.7-mile (9.2 km) industrial spur from a junction with the Norfolk Southern Railway to the Global TransPark. The company is a wholly owned subsidiary of Gulf and Ohio Railways. It is named for a railroad of the same name which operated the same route from 1903 to 1913. The railroad owns a single EMD SW900 locomotive, former Lancaster and Chester #90.

In August 2022, Gulf & Ohio chose not to renew the lease to operate this railroad and Jaguar Transport Holdings acquired leasehold rights to the track owned by the N.C. Department of Transportation (NCDOT). The railroad's new name is simply Kinston Railroad. The SW900 remains on property.
