= Pine Belt =

Pine Belt may refer to:

- Pine Belt (Mississippi), a region in southeastern Mississippi
- Pine Belt Southern Railroad, defunct railroad line in Alabama
- Pine Belt Arena, multi-purpose arena in Toms River, New Jersey
