= Alabama and Florida Railway =

Former short-line railroad in Alabama

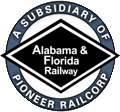

Overview
- Headquarters: Andalusia, Alabama
- Reporting mark: AF
- Locale: Southeast Alabama
- Dates of operation: 1992–2011
- Predecessor: Alabama and Florida Railroad
- Successor: Three Notch Railroad

Technical
- Track gauge: 4 ft 8 1/2 in (1,435 mm)
- Length: 43 miles (69 km)

The Alabama and Florida Railway (reporting mark AF) was a short-line railroad headquartered in Andalusia, Alabama. It was owned and operated by Pioneer Railcorp of Peoria, Illinois. It operated a former Louisville and Nashville Railroad branch line from Andalusia to Geneva, Alabama. The company abandoned the entire line in 2011.

== History ==
The company was organized in 1992 when parent Pioneer Railcorp acquired the entirety of the Alabama and Florida Railroad. This included 76.66 miles (123.37 km) between Georgiana and Geneva, Alabama and a 2.9-mile (4.7 km) line in the vicinity of Andalusia which had been leased from the Andalusia and Conecuh Railroad. Operations began on November 23, 1992. 36 miles (58 km) of track from Georgiana to Andalusia, including the track within Andalusia, was sold to Gulf and Ohio Railways and named the Three Notch Railroad on June 11, 2001. On August 9, 2011, the AF filed an exemption notice with the Surface Transportation Board to abandon its entire line.

== Links ==
HawkinsRails.net - Alabama & Florida Railway
