= Alabama and Florida Railroad (1986–1992) =

Former short-line railroad in Alabama

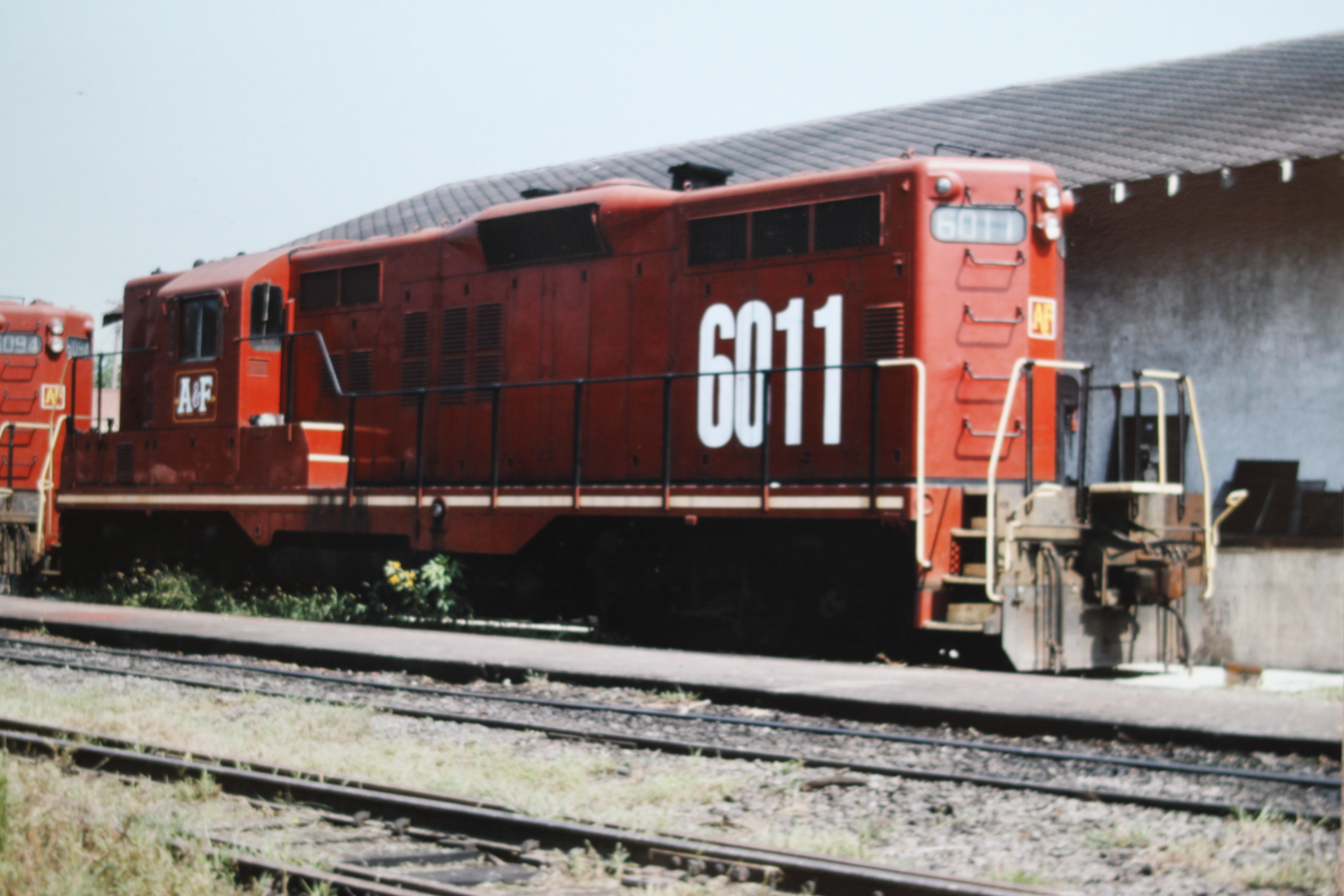
- Alabama & Florida 6011, an EMD GP9, in 1990

Overview
- Reporting mark: AFLR
- Dates of operation: 1986–1992
- Successor: Alabama and Florida Railway

Technical
- Track gauge: 4 ft 8 1/2 in (1,435 mm)
- Length: 79 miles (127 km)

The Alabama and Florida Railroad (reporting mark AFLR) was a short-line railroad which operated in Alabama and Florida. The company operated a former Louisville and Nashville Railroad (L&N) line between Georgiana, Alabama and Geneva, Alabama. Pioneer Railcorp acquired the line in 1992 and created a new company, the Alabama and Florida Railway, to operate it.

== History ==
The Alabama and Florida (A&F) owned two routes: Georgiana, Alabama–Geneva, Alabama and Crestview, Florida–Florala, Alabama. The Georgiana line was begun in 1898 by the Alabama and Florida Railroad and completed by the Louisville and Nashville Railroad in 1902. The Crestview line opened in 1894 under the Yellow River Railroad, which was acquired by the L&N in 1906. Both lines passed to the Seaboard System Railroad, the L&N's successor, in 1982.

Gulf and Ohio Railways purchased both lines in 1986 and created a new subsidiary, the Alabama and Florida Railroad, to operate them. The railroad began operating on July 28, 1986. The company abandoned the former Yellow River Railroad in December 1987. The A&F also leased a 2.9-mile (4.7 km) line from the Andalusia and Conecuh Railroad in the vicinity of Andalusia, Alabama.

The Gulf and Ohio sold the railroad to A&F Inc. on August 12, 1990. Pioneer Railcorp acquired the assets of the company on November 23, 1992, and organized a new railroad, the Alabama and Florida Railway, to operate the lines.
