= Burley Park, Lexington =

Burley Park
- Neighborhood of Lexington, Kentucky
- Interactive map of Burley Park
- Coordinates: 38.0346°N 84.5179°W
- Country: United States
- State: Kentucky
- County: Fayette
- City: Lexington
- Time zone: UTC-5 (Eastern (EST))
  - Summer (DST): UTC-4 (EDT)
- ZIP code: 40504
- Area code: 859

Burley Park is a neighborhood in southwestern Lexington, Kentucky, United States. It is named for the large number of tobacco warehouses that were once located in the neighborhood. Its boundaries are Waller Avenue and Mason Headley Road to the south, east of Beacon Hill Drive/ Summerville Drive/ Addison Park to the west, Red Mile Road and Virginia Avenue to the north, and RJ Corman railroad tracks to the east. The smaller Golf View Estates neighborhood is typically included in Burley Park.
