= Kinston Railroad =

Short-line railroad in Kinston, North Carolina

Overview
- Parent company: Jaguar Transport Holdings
- Locale: Kinston, North Carolina
- Dates of operation: 2022–present
- Predecessor: Kinston and Snow Hill Railroad

Technical
- Track gauge: 4 ft 8 1/2 in (1,435 mm)
- Length: 5.7 mi (9.2 km)

Other
- Website: jag-transport.com/kinston-railroad/

The Kinston Railroad is a short-line railroad in Kinston, North Carolina. The railroad operates a 5.7-mile (9.2 km) industrial spur from a junction with the Norfolk Southern Railway to the Global TransPark.

Until 2022, the line was operated by the Kinston and Snow Hill Railroad, a wholly owned subsidiary of Gulf and Ohio Railways. It was named for a railroad of the same name which operated the same route from 1903 to 1913. The railroad owns a single EMD SW900 locomotive, former Lancaster and Chester #90.

On June 16, 2022, the Surface Transportation Board approved the transfer of operations from the KSH to the KRR. This line, owned by the North Carolina Department of Transportation (NCDOT), connects the North Carolina Global TransPark with the North Carolina Railroad, another NCDOT-owned line.

On August 1, 2022, the new Kinston Railroad, owned by Jaguar Transport Holdings, officially took over the line from the Gulf and Ohio. The SW900 remains on property.

== Other Jaguar railroads ==
On November 5, 2020, Jaguar Transport Holdings acquired the Cimarron Valley Railroad, the Washington Eastern Railroad, the Texas and Eastern Railroad (including the Texas State Railroad tourist train), the Southwestern Railroad, and the Wyoming and Colorado Railroad (which does business as the Oregon Eastern Railroad). This acquisition also included The Western Railroad Builders, a railroad engineering, design, construction and maintenance firm.

Jaguar also operates the West Memphis Base Railroad.

On March 1, 2022, it acquired its seventh shortline, the Missouri Eastern Railroad. On May 2, Jaguar then acquired the Charlotte Western Railroad.

On August 27, 2025, it also acquired the Columbia Basin Railroad and Central Washington Railroad.
