= Lehigh Railway =

Railway in Pennsylvania

Overview
- Headquarters: Owego, New York, U.S.
- Reporting mark: LRWY
- Locale: Wyoming and Bradford counties in Pennsylvania
- Dates of operation: 2009–

Technical
- Track gauge: 4 ft 8 1/2 in (1,435 mm) standard gauge
- Length: 56 miles (90 km)

The Lehigh Railway (reporting mark LRWY) is a shortline railroad in Wyoming County and Bradford County, Pennsylvania. It connects to the Reading Blue Mountain and Northern Railroad in Mehoopany and to Norfolk Southern in Athens, just south of Sayre. It operates a total of 56 miles of track along the Susquehanna River. Since 2020, the railroad has been operated by the R.J. Corman Railroad Group as its Lehigh Line.

The railroad was formed in 2009 to lease and operate Norfolk Southern's Lehigh Secondary from Mehoopany to Athens, which is the northern branch of the Lehigh Valley Main Line from Wilkes-Barre to Sayre. This is not to be confused with NS's Lehigh Line, which runs from Manville, New Jersey, to M&H Junction, Pennsylvania, via Allentown, Pennsylvania. Major commodities hauled by the Lehigh Railway include drilling supplies, frack sand, chemicals, building products, and agricultural products. The total number of cars transported in 2013 numbered over 7700.

The Lehigh Railway was headquartered at 25 Delphine Street in Owego, New York, as part of a holding company for three shortline railroads in the Twin Tiers along with the Meridian Southern Railway in Mississippi.

The railroad was purchased along with its two sister companies on August 19, 2020, by R.J. Corman Railroad Group.
