= H and S Railroad =

Overview
- Headquarters: Hartford, Alabama
- Reporting mark: HS
- Locale: Southeast Alabama
- Dates of operation: 1992–2006
- Predecessor: Hartford & Slocomb
- Successor: Chattahoochee Bay

Technical
- Track gauge: 4 ft 8 1/2 in (1,435 mm) standard gauge
- Length: 6 miles (9.7 km)

The H and S Railroad (reporting mark HS) was a shortline railroad operating 6 miles (9.7 km) of track from Dothan to Taylor, Alabama. Upon its start in 1992 the railroad was a Gulf & Ohio subsidiary. The railroad was purchased by Genesee & Wyoming Railroad in 2006 and was combined with a neighboring property, the Chattahoochee and Gulf Railroad, to form the Chattahoochee Bay Railroad.

== History ==
On April 29, 1992 16 miles (26 km) of the Hartford & Slocomb was abandoned between Taylor and Hartford. The remainder was sold by the Itel Corporation to Gulf & Ohio subsidiary H and S Railroad. Primary traffic consisted of railcars moving to and from a repair facility near Taylor.

The railroad remained relatively unchanged until August 30, 2006 when it was sold to Genesee & Wyoming. Operations were merged with the Chattahoochee and Gulf Railroad and are operated as a single railroad.
