= Morehead and South Fork Railroad =

Terminal switching railroad

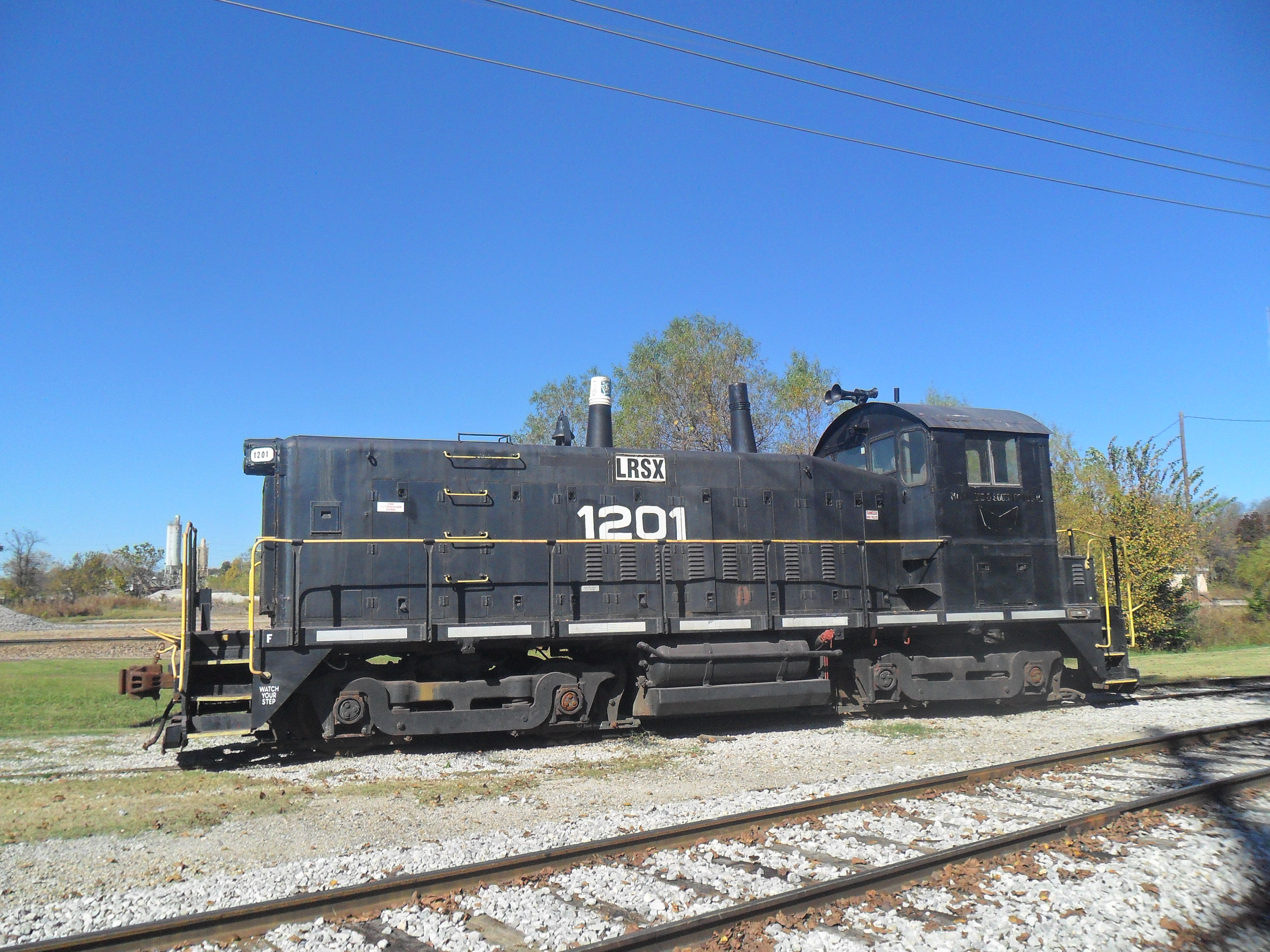
- LRSX 1201, seen here in 2015 on the Tulsa-Sapulpa Union Railway in Sapulpa, Oklahoma, still faintly bears the Morehead and South Fork logo underneath the cab windows.

Overview
- Headquarters: Morehead City, North Carolina
- Reporting mark: MHSF
- Locale: Coastal North Carolina
- Dates of operation: 2005–2010
- Predecessor: Beaufort and Morehead Railway

Technical
- Track gauge: 4 ft 8 1/2 in (1,435 mm) standard gauge
- Length: 9.5 miles (15.3 kilometres)

Other
- Website: G&O: Morehead and Southfork Railroad

The Morehead and South Fork Railroad (reporting mark MHSF) is a terminal switching railroad serving the port facilities of Morehead City, North Carolina and Radio Island with 9.5 miles (15.3 km) of track. Created in 2005 as a successor to Carolina Rail Services, the railroad was initially a Gulf & Ohio subsidiary before a change of contract in 2010 transferred operational responsibility to the Carolina Coastal Railway.

Traffic includes rubber, chemicals, metal, and others, generating 3,000 annual carloads.

== History ==
The first rail line reached Morehead City in 1858, and was constructed by the state sponsored Atlantic and North Carolina Railroad. Beginning in 1904 the railroad was operated under lease by the original Norfolk Southern Railway (NS). The lease on the segment from Morehead City to Beaufort was dropped by NS in 1937. The Beaufort and Morehead Railway was created on May 31, 1937 to operate the line vacated by NS.

On January 12, 1981 the North Carolina Ports Railway Commission acquired the Beaufort & Morehead Railway and began independent operations. In 1986, the NCPRC transferred operations of the Beaufort & Morehead to Carolina Rail Services. 1998 brought an additional change, as the Beaufort & Morehead was merged with the state owned North Carolina Railroad. The following year control of the franchise was transferred back to the North Carolina Ports Railway Commission.

Action by the state government in 2002 abolished the NCPRC and merged its assets with the North Carolina State Ports Authority. Further change came in 2005 as Gulf & Ohio created a new subsidiary, Morehead & South Fork, to replace the Beaufort & Morehead and take control of the lease from Carolina Rail Services. Ownership remained with the State Port Authority.

In February 2010, the Carolina Coastal Railway took control of the lease and began operating the Morehead & South Fork.

== See also ==
- Gulf and Ohio Railways
- Carolina Coastal Railway
