= Chattahoochee and Gulf Railroad =

Class III railroad in Alabama and Georgia, US

Chattahoochee Bay Railroad
Overview
- Headquarters: Panama City, Florida
- Reporting mark: CHAT
- Locale: Southeast Alabama, Southwest Georgia
- Dates of operation: 2006–
- Predecessor: Chattahoochee and Gulf

Technical
- Track gauge: 4 ft 8 1/2 in (1,435 mm) (standard gauge)
- Length: 28.2 miles (45.4 km)

Chattahoochee and Gulf Railroad
Overview
- Headquarters: Dothan, Alabama
- Reporting mark: CHAT
- Locale: Southeast Alabama, Southwest Georgia
- Dates of operation: 2003–2006
- Predecessor: Norfolk Southern
- Successor: Chattahoochee Bay

Technical
- Track gauge: 4 ft 8 1/2 in (1,435 mm) (standard gauge)
- Length: 24.2 miles (38.9 km)

The Chattahoochee and Gulf Railroad (reporting mark CHAT) was a short line railroad operating from 2003 to 2006 between Columbus, Georgia, and Dothan, Alabama, on former Central of Georgia and Norfolk Southern tracks. Initially the railroad was a subsidiary of Gulf & Ohio Railways. In 2006, the railroad was acquired by Genesee & Wyoming and combined with the adjacent H and S Railroad out of Dothan to form the Chattahoochee Bay Railroad.

Commodities include chemicals, forest products, food products, and feed, which generate approximately 5,500 annual carloads.

== History ==
In 1900 the Chattahoochee and Gulf Railroad completed the construction of a line from Columbia to Lockhart, Alabama. The railroad was leased and operated by the Central of Georgia Railway (CofG) until the line was abandoned from Lockhart to Hartford in 1940. The CofG became a subsidiary of the Southern Railway, which merged into the Norfolk Southern in 1982.

On March 7, 2003, Norfolk Southern sold the line between Hilton and Dothan to the Chattahoochee and Gulf railroad, a Gulf & Ohio subsidiary. The railroad connected to another G&O subsidiary, the H and S Railroad, at Dothan.

Another railroad group, Genesee & Wyoming, expanded into the region in 2003 and 2005 with acquisition of the Chattahoochee Industrial Railroad and Bay Line Railroad, respectively. As the Chattahoochee & Gulf connected with both subsidiaries, G&W sought to fill the gap and purchased the C&G as well as the H&S in 2006. Both railroads were then merged into a single operation, named the Chattahoochee Bay Railroad. This gave Genesee & Wyoming a contiguous route from the paper mill at Cedar Springs, Georgia to the port of Panama City, Florida, allowing for more efficient operation under the unified carrier.

The Chattahoochee Bay railroad totals 28.2 miles (45.4 km) and interchanges with CSX and the Bay Line Railroad at Dothan, as well as Norfolk Southern and the Chattahoochee Industrial Railroad at Hilton.
