= Vandalia Railroad (1983) =

Overview
- Headquarters: Vandalia, Illinois
- Reporting mark: VRRC
- Locale: Vandalia, Illinois
- Dates of operation: 1983–

Technical
- Track gauge: 4 ft 8 1/2 in (1,435 mm) standard gauge

Other
- Website: pioneerlines.com/vandalia-railroad-vrrc/

The Vandalia Railroad (reporting mark VRRC) is a shortline railroad subsidiary of Pioneer Railcorp, providing local service from a CSX Transportation connection in Vandalia, Illinois. The line part of the original main line of the Illinois Central Railroad, completed in the 1850s between Cairo and Galena. Successor Illinois Central Gulf Railroad abandoned the portion through Centralia in 1981, and in December 1983 the newly created Vandalia Railroad reactivated a short piece. Pioneer Railcorp gained control in October 1994. Vandalia Railroad is still in use as of 2023 but less than previously since CSX rarely stops there.

== Equipment ==
VRRC uses L&N SW1200 number 2271 renumbered to 104 and painted into a yellow and black paint scheme. Pioneer RailCorp has also uses PREX GP9 number 910, which is a former Cotton Belt GP9 numbered 824.

== Remnants ==
U.S. Route 51 follows the abandoned line all the way into Freeport, Illinois. Bridges and trackage are still in use in Decatur, Illinois.

The Vandalia Railroad depot still stands in Greenville, Illinois although the station has been rebuilt and the line moved, a track still stands behind the station were boxcars would set.
