= McNeil, Travis County, Texas =

McNeil
- Unincorporated community
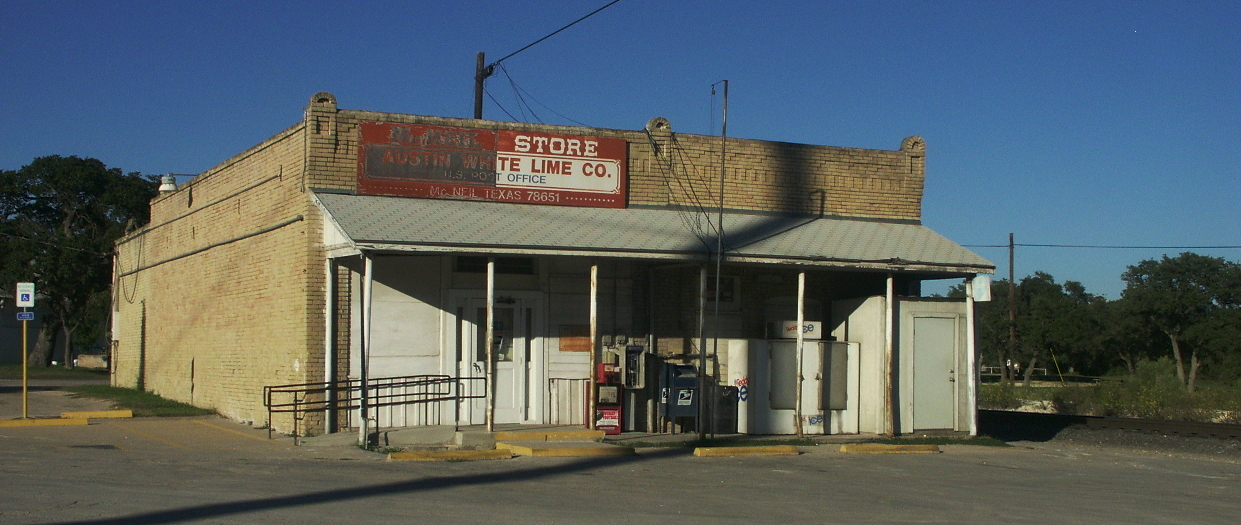
- Post Office and Austin White Lime Company Store

- Location within the state of Texas McNeil (the United States)
- Coordinates: 30°27′11″N 97°43′14″W
- Country: United States
- State: Texas
- County: Travis
- Elevation: 830 ft (250 m)
- Time zone: UTC-6 (Central (CST))
  - Summer (DST): UTC-5 (CDT)
- ZIP codes: 78651
- GNIS feature ID: 1362533

McNeil is an unincorporated community in Travis County, Texas, United States. According to the Handbook of Texas, the community had a population of 70 in 2000. It is located within the Greater Austin Metropolitan area.

== History ==
McNeil arose at the junction of two rail lines. The International & Great Northern Railroad had a track built between Rockdale and Austin, which was completed in 1876. The Austin and Northwestern Railroad built a track from Austin to Burnet in 1892. It was named for George McNeil, a regional manager on the A&N. The community's post office was established in December 1888, with Adison A. Sheppard as the postmaster.

The "McNeil" name is currently used mostly for the Austin White Lime Company facility and railroad junction. The surrounding areas have Austin mailing addresses.

From 1888 to 2024, the Austin White Lime Company operated a limestone quarry and a plant for the production of lime products. The final day of operation was March 31st, 2024..

Just prior to Austin White Lime's closure, Megaacrete (a joint venture of Litecrete and Aercon) had plans to develop a 120,000 sqft corporate headquarters, training center and manufacturing hub on 87 acres in Kerrville. The plant was to produce autoclaved aerated concrete and was expected to create 40 jobs, however, the closure of the Austin White Lime plant upended those plans, as the next closest supplier that had the needed production capability was in Mississippi.

The land on which Austin White Lime operated is part of Robinson Ranch.. On June 26, 2026, it was reported that Robinson Ranch had partnered with Endeavor Real Estate Group (best known as the developers of The Domain) to develop 1,200 acres of the 6,400 that make up Robinson Ranch.

== Current Status ==
Although McNeil is unincorporated, it has a post office with the ZIP code of 78651. The ZIP code only includes the McNeil Post Office/Austin White Lime company store and no surrounding land.

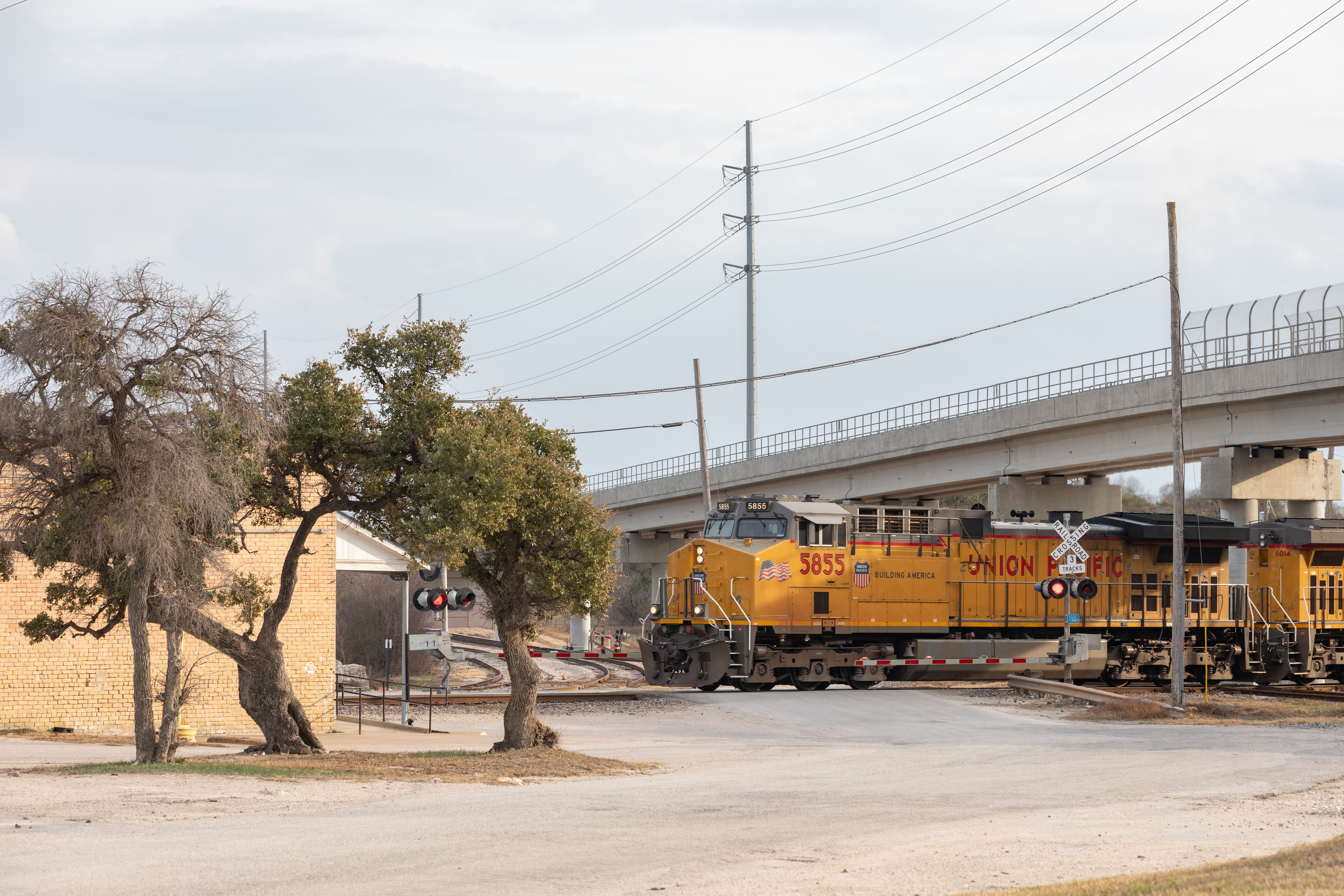
A Union Pacific train passes the post office in McNeil

The current rail lines are owned by the Capital Metropolitan Transportation Authority (Cap Metro) and the Union Pacific Railroad (UP). The Cap Metro lines are the former A&N rail lines. Cap Metro currently runs commuter rail and freight rail operations through McNeil. The Capital MetroRail serves McNeil at Howard station. Freight operations on Cap Metro are operated under contract by Austin Western Railroad. Commuter rail operations use an overpass built in 2007 over the UP tracks. Freight operations use a diamond crossing with UP. Freight is interchanged between UP and Austin Western. BNSF serves Austin Western via trackage rights over UP.

In addition to these rail lines, McNeil also had a hotel, a general store, and 200 residents. It fell to 125 by the 1930s and was at 70 from the 1940s through 2000.

== Geography ==
McNeil is located 15 mi (24 km) north of Austin in northern Travis County.

== Education ==
McNeil High School was built in 1991 and began classes in 1992, with its first senior class graduating in 1994. It is served by the Round Rock Independent School District.
