= Lexington and Ohio Railroad (1996–2003) =

Overview
- Headquarters: Lexington, Kentucky
- Reporting mark: LXOH
- Locale: Kentucky
- Dates of operation: 1996–2003
- Predecessor: Norfolk Southern
- Successor: R. J. Corman Railroad/Central Kentucky Lines

Technical
- Track gauge: 4 ft 8 1/2 in (1,435 mm) (standard gauge)
- Length: 15 miles (24 km)

The Lexington and Ohio Railroad (reporting mark LXOH) was a shortline railroad formerly operating between a connection with Norfolk Southern at Lexington to Versailles, Kentucky, about 15 miles (24 km). Upon its 1996 startup the railroad was a Gulf & Ohio subsidiary, the railroad was later sold R.J. Corman Railroad Group, who has operated the line as R. J. Corman Railroad/Central Kentucky Lines since 2003.
