= Fairland, Texas =

- Unincorporated community
- Location within Texas Location within the United States
- Coordinates: 30°38′39″N 98°17′5″W
- Country: United States
- State: Texas
- County: Burnet
- Elevation: 951 ft (290 m)
- Time zone: UTC-6 (Central (CST))
  - Summer (DST): UTC-5 (CDT)
- Area codes: 512 & 737
- GNIS feature ID: 1379745

Fairland is an unincorporated community in Burnet County, Texas, United States. According to the Handbook of Texas, the community had an estimated population of 290 in 2000.

== History ==
The Austin Western Railroad and Austin and Northwestern Railroads travel through the community.

== Geography ==
Fairland is located on Farm to Market Road 1855, 6 mi (9.7 km) north of Marble Falls and 9 mi (14 km) south of Burnet in Burnet County.

== Education ==
It continues to be served by Marble Falls ISD today, with elementary kids attending Colt Elementary.
