= Alabama Railroad =

Former American railway

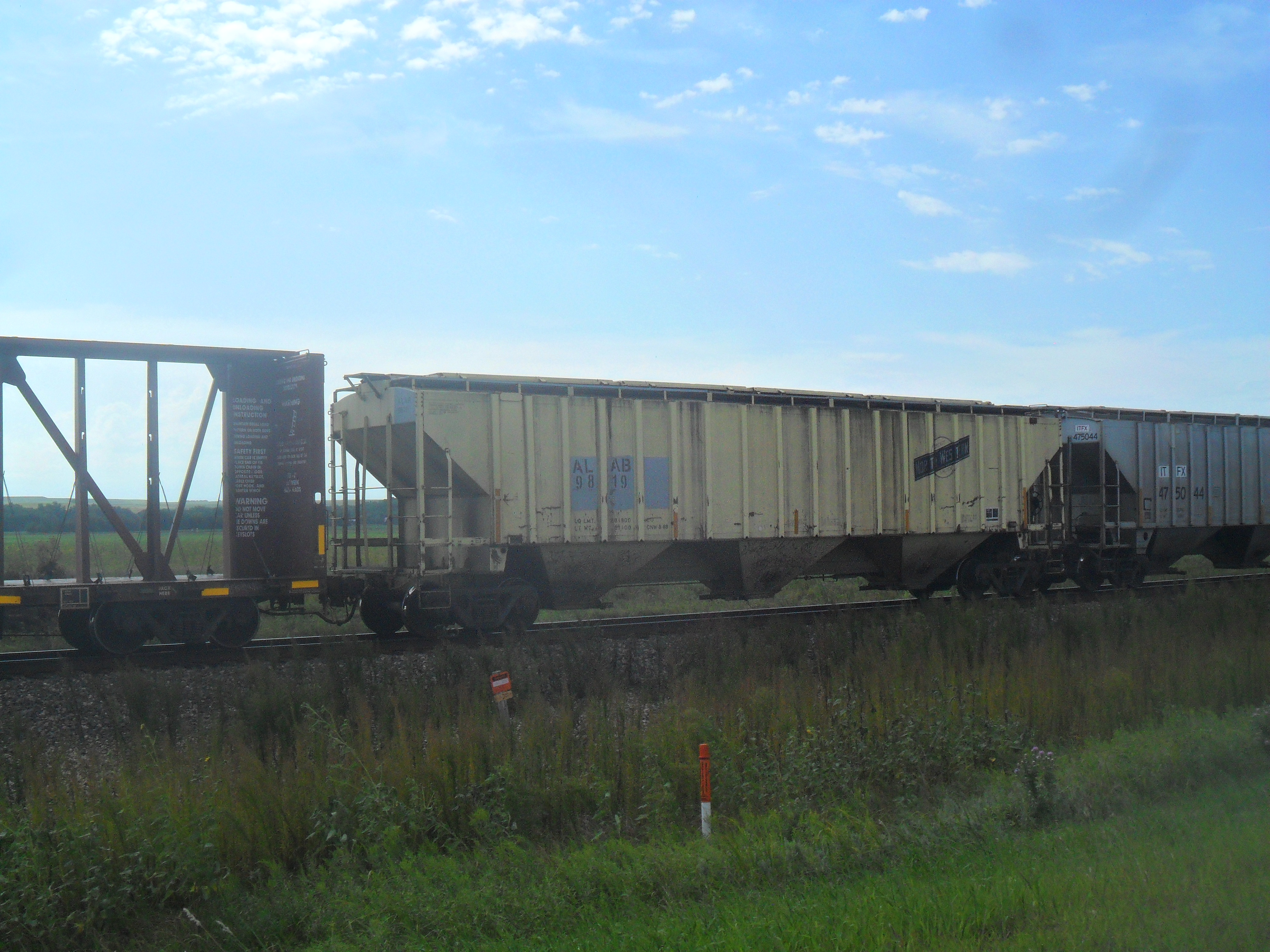
- Former Chicago and North Western Railroad hopper car with Alabama Railroad reporting marks, seen here east of Florence, Kansas.

Overview
- Headquarters: Monroeville, Alabama
- Reporting mark: ALAB
- Locale: Alabama
- Dates of operation: 1991–2022
- Predecessor: CSX Transportation

Technical
- Track gauge: 4 ft 8 1/2 in (1,435 mm)
- Length: 48 miles (77 km)

The Alabama Railroad (reporting mark ALAB) was a class III railroad as reported by the Association of American Railroads. The ALAB was owned and operated by Alabama Railroad LLC. The railroad operated 48 miles (77 km) of railroad from Flomaton, Alabama, to Peterman, Alabama.

On April 18, 2019, the railroad filed to abandon its entire line. In 2020, the line was purchased intact by Alabama Railroad LLC who filed on July 6, 2022, to abandon the entire line.

== History ==
The route of the Alabama Railroad was originally constructed over several years (between 1880 and 1901) as the Pensacola & Selma Railroad and quickly became a part of the Louisville & Nashville Railroad network. The original line proceeded north from Corduroy, Alabama, to Selma, Alabama. That portion of the line was abandoned by the Seaboard System prior to the merger with CSX in 1986. There was also a L&N branch that went to Camden from a junction just northeast of Corduroy that was abandoned prior to the merger into the Seaboard System in 1986. The remainder of the line north of Peterman, Alabama, was abandoned in approximately 1994 to include an 800+ foot tunnel built in 1899 located at Tunnel Springs, Alabama. The ALAB connected with CSX Transportation at Flomaton, Alabama. The railroad served three industries located in Monroeville, Alabama, and stored railcars for other railroads. The ALAB served Temple Inland with outbound shipments of particle board and veneer, a cement powder transload operated by Gate Precast, and Harrigan Lumber after its re-opening in 2010. The railroad operated three EMD GP20 locomotives on a bi-weekly basis. The Alabama Railroad had several bridges and trestles found to be deficient in late 2016, and subsequently the railroad had an embargo placed on loaded freight cars. Many empty surplus oil tank cars were placed into storage on the ALAB's tracks and the storage fees composed much of the company's revenue. Tracks through the Tunnel Hill tunnel and northwards have been removed. After Alabama Railroad LLC took over for Pioneer Railcorp, they moved off all remaining hoppers that were stored, and started ripping up whatever track was left. Though crossings were being cut as early as 2021, as Repton did it that June. All track south to Osaka got pulled, with remaining track staying in place south to Flomaton; the interchange got pulled out at Flomaton with CSX between 2023 & 2025.

== Route ==
The Alabama Railroad operated 48 miles (77 km) of railroad from Flomaton to Peterman.

== See also ==
- Pioneer Railcorp
