= Oldcastle Materials =

Atlanta-based building material supplier company

Oldcastle Materials Inc.
- Logo
- Type: Subsidiary
- Headquarters: 900 Ashwood Parkway, Suite 700, Atlanta, Georgia, United States
- Number of locations: 1,200 (2018)
- Key people: Randy Lake (CEO); David Guillaume (President); Charlie Brown (CFO); John J. Keating (COO)
- Revenue: ▲$7 Billion
- Number of employees: 18,000 (2018)
- Parent: CRH plc

Oldcastle Materials Inc. is an American supplier of asphalt, concrete, and other building materials, and also offers construction and paving services. The Atlanta-based company is a subsidiary of CRH plc, a publicly traded international group of diversified building materials businesses, and has approximately 18,000 employees at 1,200 locations, as of March 2018.

== Description and subsidiaries ==
Oldcastle Materials has been described as a leading supplier of construction materials, including aggregates, asphalt, cement, concrete, and rocks. The company also offers construction and paving services throughout North America. Oldcastle Materials had approximately 1,200 locations in 43 U.S. states and 8 provinces of Canada, as of April 2017. The company is incorporated in Delaware and headquartered in Atlanta. Randy Lake is chief executive officer (CEO).

Brands and subsidiaries include:

- Anchor Wall Systems, Inc.
- APAC Central
- APAC-Texas
- Arkhola
- Central Pre-Mix Concrete
- Egge Sand & Gravel
- Eugene Sand & Gravel
- Four Corners Materials
- Inland Asphalt
- Interstate Concrete & Asphalt Co.
- Midsouth Aggregates
- Mulzer Crushed Stone (Tell City, Indiana)
- Oldcastle Materials Northwest Group
- Pennsy Supply, Inc. (Harrisburg, Pennsylvania)
- Pike Industries Inc. (Belmont, New Hampshire)
- Preferred Materials (Fort Myers, Florida)
- Sakrete Concrete (Atlanta, Georgia)
- Shelly Co. (Thornville, Ohio)
- Southern Minnesota Construction
- Spokane Rock Products (Spokane, Washington)
- Staker Parson Company (Ogden, Utah)
- Stoneco (Ann Arbor, Michigan)
- Tilcon New York
- United Companies (Grand Junction, Colorado)
- West Virginia Paving

== History ==
Tom Hill was named Oldcastle Materials' president in 1991, and CEO in early 2000. The company saw significant growth during his tenure. Oldcastle Materials' sales increased from $100 million to $7 billion between 1992 and 2006.

In October 2016, Oldcastle Materials announced plans to build a new asphalt plant and distribution center at Port San Antonio's East Kelly Railport.

=== Acquisitions and divestitures ===
The company acquired Tilcon in 1996. Oldcastle Materials purchased Central Pre-Mix, Four Corners Materials, Inland Asphalt, and Interstate Concrete in 1997. The company acquired Thompson-McCully Co. in mid 1999, and Acme Materials & Construction in 2000. In March 2002, Oldcastle Materials agreed to purchase US Aggregates operations in Alabama, Arizona, Nevada, Tennessee, and Utah, Arizona, for $140 million.

In 2006, the company acquired Egge Sand & Gravel. Oldcastle Materials took a fifty percent equity stake in American Cement Company for $50 million, marking Oldcastle Materials' entry into the U.S. cement industry and its first investment in Florida. The company also purchased Ashland Inc.'s paving and construction business for $1.3 billion. Oldcastle Materials purchased McMinn's Asphalt in 2007, and subsequently made the company part of its Pennsy Supply subsidiary. Oldcastle Materials also purchased Eugene Sand & Gravel in 2007. The company acquired asphalt and concrete assets of the Wheeler Companies (Ironhorse Asphalt, Texas Concrete Materials, Wheeler Coatings Asphalt, and Wheeler Coatings SA) in late 2009 for an undisclosed amount. The merged company became known as APAC Texas-Wheeler Companies.

Oldcastle Materials acquired Central Supply Inc. and Central Trucking, based in Clarksburg, West Virginia, in November 2011. Some of Central Pre-Mix's assets were sold to American Rock Products in December 2014. Boxley Materials' West Virginia operations, which included a concrete plant trucking business, and quarries, were sold to Oldcastle Materials in late 2015. Mulzer Crushed Stone was acquired in March 2017 and had approximately 600 employees in three U.S. states at the time. Spokane Rock Products had approximately 120 employees when Oldcastle Materials purchased the company in March 2018.

== Rankings and recognition ==
According to United States Geological Survey (USGS) data, Oldcastle Materials was the fourth largest aggregate producer in the United States in 2004. The company ranked third by 2011, and was also the leading sand and gravel producer. Oldcastle Materials was the fourth largest crushed stone producer in the nation in 2012, according to the USGS. The company ranked number three on Aggregate Manager's 2012 list of the "top 25 construction aggregates producers" in the U.S., and number three on its 2016 list of the nation's "top 25 crushed stone producers". The USGS said Oldcastle Materials was the third largest crushed stone producer in the U.S. in 2017. The company was the leading asphalt producer in the nation, as of 2017.
