= Pine Belt Southern Railroad =

Former shortline railroad in Alabama, United States

Overview
- Headquarters: Shelbyville, Tennessee
- Reporting mark: PBRR
- Locale: East Central Alabama
- Dates of operation: 1995–2003
- Predecessor: Norfolk Southern
- Successor: None (Abandoned)

Technical
- Track gauge: 4 ft 8 1/2 in (1,435 mm) (standard gauge)
- Length: 42.4 miles (68.2 km)

The Pine Belt Southern Railroad (reporting mark PBRR) was a shortline railroad formerly operating on two disconnected track segments in east central Alabama, United States. Upon its start in 1995 the railroad ran over a branch from Nuckols to Hurtsboro, Alabama. In 1996 a second branch was acquired, extending from Roanoke, Jct., near Opelika, to Lafayette, Alabama. Together the lines totaled 42.4 miles (68.2 km) and the railroad was controlled by Richard Abernathy.

Both track segments were abandoned beginning with the Hurtsboro segment in 2002 and the Lafayette line in 2003.

== History ==
=== Between Nuckols and Hurtsboro ===
The twenty-five miles of track operated by PBRR in Russell, Bullock, and Macon Counties was constructed as part of the Mobile & Girard Railroad in the mid-19th century. In 1850, Alabama was granted a right of way across US government lands from Girard, Alabama (across the Chattahoochee River from Columbus, Georgia) to Mobile Bay. By the outbreak of the Civil War, the line had been completed from Girard to Union Springs. The line was completed to Troy in 1870 and later as far as Andalusia.

In 1879, the Central of Georgia Railroad expanded into Alabama with the purchase of the Montgomery & Eufaula Railroad. Several Alabama shortlines were thereafter acquired, including the M&G. The Central of Georgia became part of the Southern Railway in 1963; Southern and Norfolk & Western Railway merged for form Norfolk Southern in 1982. NS gradually abandoned the former M&G line. First from Andalusia to Goshen in 1986, and then from Troy to Hurtsboro in 1988.

PBRR purchased the remaining line from the NS interchange at Nuckols ( Milepost S-304.00) to Hurtsboro (Milepost S-329.00) on July 27, 1995. Traffic on the line was 95% sand (US Silica Company west of downtown Hurtsboro), 4% logs, and 1% inbound finished lumber.

After the sand distributor that accounted for the overwhelming majority of traffic on the line lost its key rail supplied customer, the line was found to no longer be economically viable. The last train operated over the line in 2000. On May 1, 2002, PBRR filed a Notice of Exemption with the Surface Transportation Board for abandonment of the line. Though the Macon County Commission was granted a public use condition by the STB to explore acquisition of the right of way for public use, the line officially abandoned on June 1, 2003. The ties and rails were removed though the roadbed remains.

=== Between Roanoke Junction and LaFayette ===
The PBRR also operated a 17.4 mile long branch line from Roanoke Junction (milepost T-322.40) near Opelika to LaFayette (milepost T-339.66). The line was a portion of the East Alabama Railway which operated in the late 19th century. The East Alabama Railway was later bought by the Central of Georgia Railroad subsequent to 1895. The route from Opelika to Roanoke was known as the “Johnney Ray Train” and the “Roanoke Rocket”. The northern portion of the line from LaFayette to Roanoke was abandoned in 1982. Central of Georgia corporate successor Norfolk Southern sold the line to PBRR on August 9, 1995. One customer shipping pulp wood and wood chips was served by the branch line at the time of the sale.

The PBRR branch had interchange agreements with both CSX and Norfolk Southern. PBRR also had trackage rights over CSX from downtown Opelika (interchange with NS) to Roanoke Junction northeast of Opelika. The line serviced the East Alabama Lumber company and the Langly Wood Yard in LaFayette. The tracks ended at 2nd Avenue North in LaFayette.

In 2001, East Alabama Lumber filed for bankruptcy and sold to a company that was a user of trucks for transportation and elected not to continue to use rail to serve the East Alabama Lumber facility. Additionally, Langly Wood Yard switched to truck to supply pulp wood to the paper mills. A group of local governments consisting of Lee County, Chambers County, and the City of LaFayette, led by the City of Opelika intervened in the STB hearings in an attempt to establish a Rails to Trails multi-use path to be known as the Johnny Ray Trail. Despite the intervention before the STB, the efforts failed and the line was formally abandoned in 2004 after not operating since 2001.
