= Keating, Pennsylvania =

Unincorporated community in Pennsylvania, US

- Unincorporated community
- Location within Pennsylvania
- Coordinates: 41°15′32″N 77°54′15″W
- Country: United States
- State: Pennsylvania
- County: Clinton
- Elevation: 728 ft (222 m)
- Time zone: UTC-5 (Eastern (EST))
  - Summer (DST): UTC-4 (EDT)
- Area code: 570
- GNIS feature ID: 1178270

Keating is an unincorporated community in East Keating Township, Clinton County, Pennsylvania, United States.
