= Hollis and Eastern Railroad =

Railway line in the United States

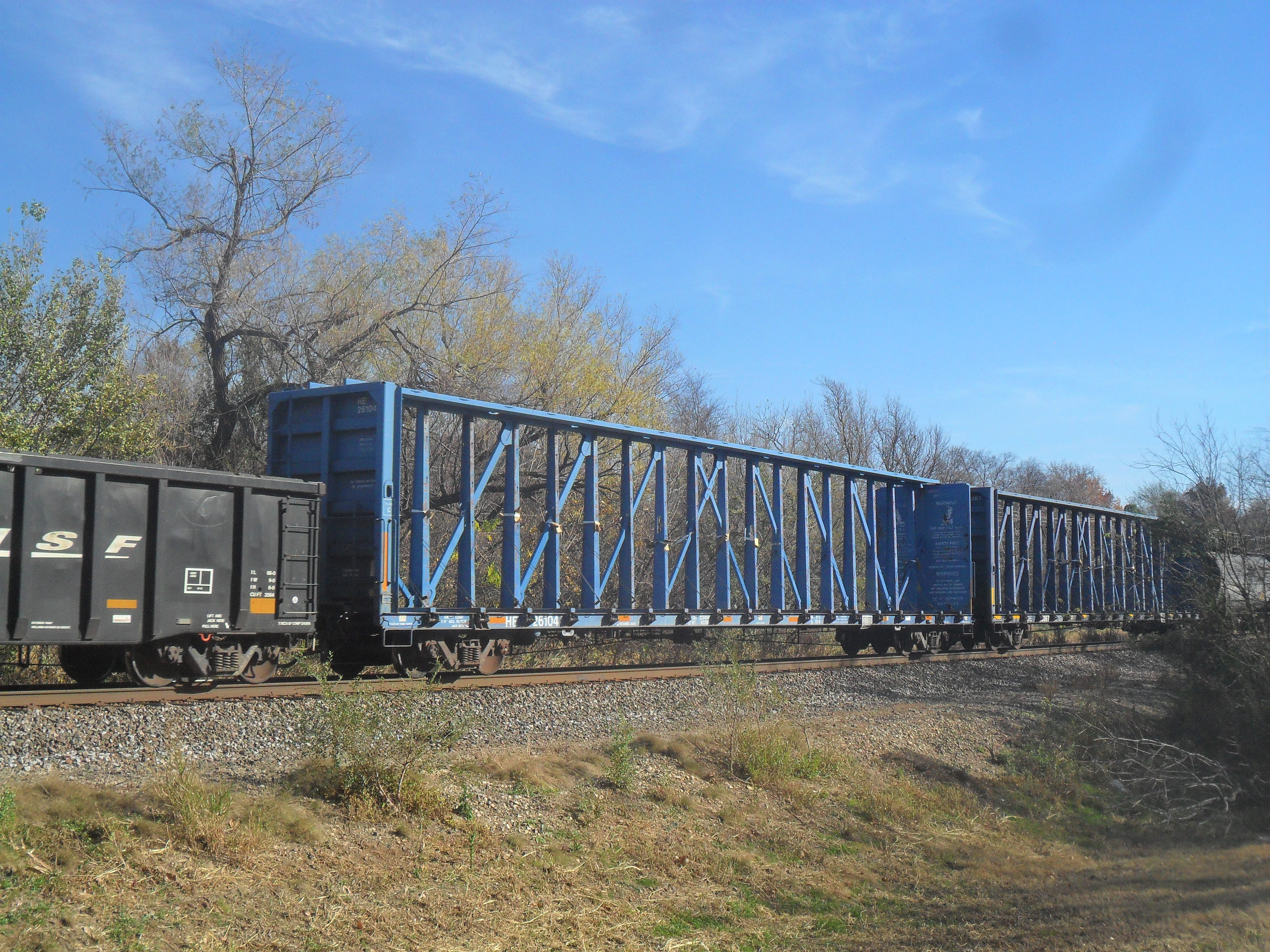
- Centerbeam flatcar from the Hollis and Eastern Railroad on a freight train in Norman, Oklahoma

Overview
- Headquarters: Duke, OK
- Reporting mark: HE
- Locale: Oklahoma
- Dates of operation: 1958–2010

Technical
- Track gauge: 4 ft 8 1/2 in (1,435 mm) standard gauge

Hollis and Eastern Railroad (reporting mark HE) was a shortline railroad which operated in the U.S. state of Oklahoma. The railroad's tracks connected Duke to connections with the BNSF Railway, Farmrail and Wichita, Tillman and Jackson Railway at Altus, Oklahoma.

== History ==
The H&E line was originally constructed by the Altus, Wichita Falls & Hollis Railway and the Wichita Falls & Northwestern Railway in 1912. Both of these predecessor railroads were part of the "Wichita Falls Route" and were soon purchased by the Missouri-Kansas-Texas Railroad (MKT).

The Hollis & Eastern was incorporated on October 15, 1958, beginning operations on the former MKT Wellington branch between Altus and Hollis on May 15, 1959. The line west of Hollis to Wellington, Texas was abandoned at that time and sold for scrap and never operated by the H&E. The railroad was purchased by Republic Gypsum Company in 1971 which later abandoned the section between Hollis, Gould and Duke in 1975. Republic Gypsum later sold the plant to American Gypsum in 1998.

Primary commodities handled on the H&E include wallboard (sheet rock) originating from the Republic (later American) Gypsum plant in Duke and wheat shipped from elevators at Duke and Victory. The H&E interchanges with the Wichita, Tillman & Jackson (WTJ) at Welon Yard, with Farmrail (also at Welon) and with the Stillwater Central and BNSF in Altus. Because of a slowed economy and increased sales of Chinese wallboard being imported into the United States, American Gypsum decided in 2009 to end its own operations of the H&E and to lease the line to another carrier. Bids were received in early 2010 and Stillwater Central Railroad was chosen as the new rail operator. Independent operations of the H&E were scheduled to be taken over by Stillwater Central effective April 5, 2010 with the H&E last day as an independent carrier taking place on Easter Sunday, April 4, 2010.

The last official H&E train operated between Altus and Duke on Thursday, April 1, 2010.
