= Carolina Coastal Railway =

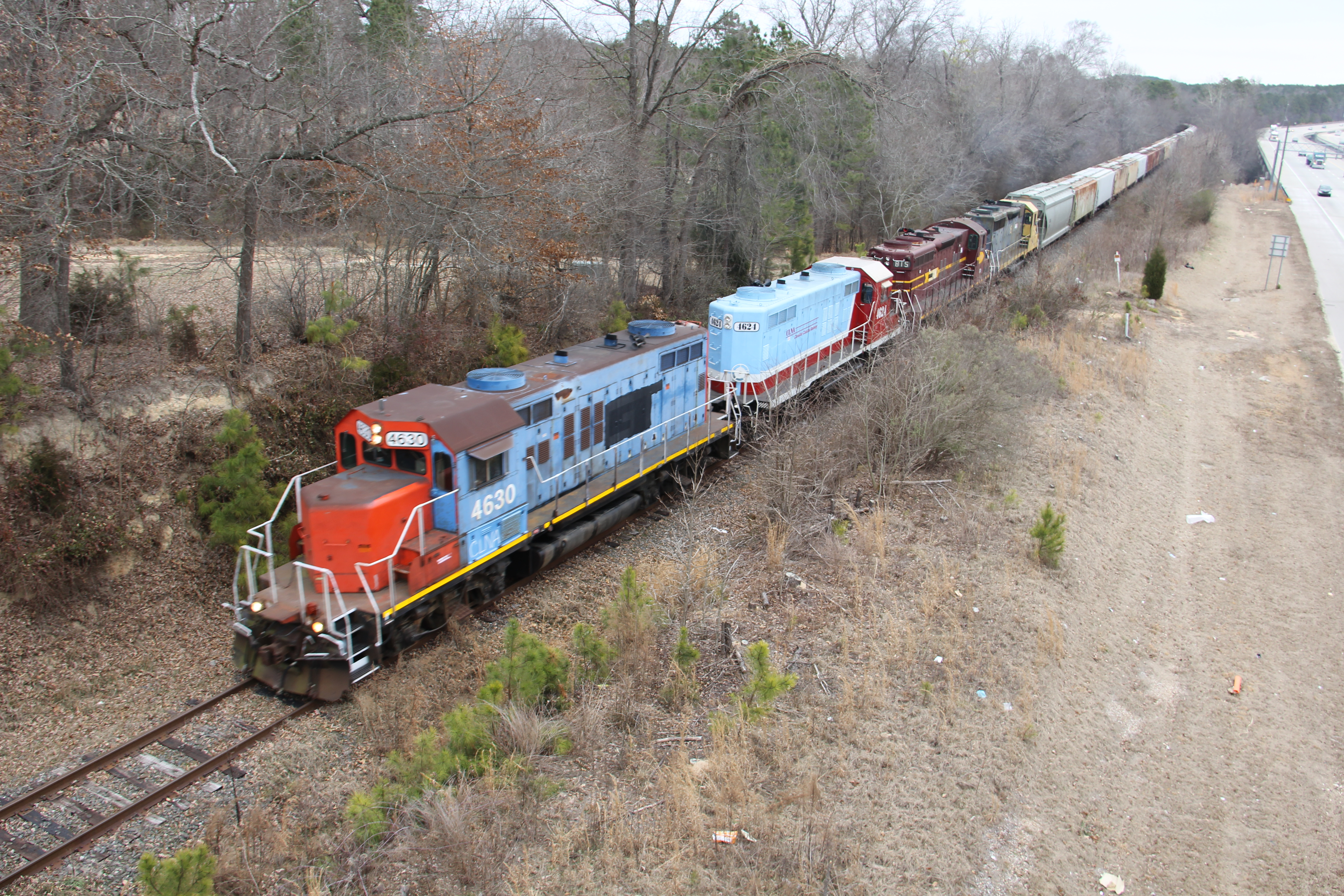
- A four-engine consist of the Carolina Coastal Railway (CLNA) hauls 30 cars of freight across the Neuse River on the way to Raleigh, NC from Wilson, NC.

Overview
- Headquarters: Wilson, North Carolina
- Reporting mark: CLNA
- Locale: North Carolina, with one line in South Carolina
- Dates of operation: 1989–present
- Predecessor: Norfolk Southern Railroad

Technical
- Track gauge: 4 ft 8 1/2 in (1,435 mm) standard gauge
- Length: 198 miles (319 kilometres)

Other
- Website: regional-rail.com/carolina-coastal-railway/

Carolina Coastal Railway (reporting mark CLNA) is a shortline railroad that operates several lines in North Carolina and one line in South Carolina. According to its current website, the railroad spans 179 track miles and operates sixteen locomotives.

== History ==
CLNA was created in 1989 under the Thoroughbred Shortline Program of Norfolk Southern and was a subsidiary of Rail Link, Inc., which became a subsidiary of Genesee & Wyoming in 1995. The original line was 17 miles (27 km) from Pinetown, North Carolina to Belhaven. CLNA interchanged with NS at Pinetown. CLNA was acquired by Main Line Rail Management, Inc. in 2003.

In 2006, CLNA began to serve a former NS branch between Whitney and Badin where Alcoa previously operated a large aluminum plant.

On March 25, 2007, CLNA entered into a lease agreement with NS for the Plymouth-Raleigh route, 147 miles of the former mainline of the original Norfolk Southern. In 2010, CLNA began providing contract switching services in Kinston, North Carolina.

In 2011, CLNA began serving the Port of Morehead City by taking over the Morehead and South Fork Railroad. The CLNA also purchased a line between Rocky Mount and Spring Hope previously known as the Nash County Railroad, and began operating a former NS branch between Blacksburg, South Carolina and Kings Creek, South Carolina. Operations on this branch ceased in 2013.

In 2020, the railroad was purchased by Regional Rail and after a decade of using part of the Raleigh mainline for car storage active rail service to Raleigh is currently being restored.

== See also ==
- Thoroughbred Shortline Program
