= Richard J. Corman =

U.S. railroad services company founder

Richard Corman
- Born: Richard Jay Corman; July 22, 1955; Nicholasville, Kentucky, United States
- Died: August 23, 2013 (aged 58); Nicholasville, Kentucky, United States

Richard Jay Corman (July 22, 1955 – August 23, 2013) was the founder and owner of R. J. Corman Railroad Group, a Nicholasville, Kentucky-based railroad services and short line operating company.

== Early life ==
Corman was born and died in Nicholasville, Kentucky. The son of a state highway worker, he grew up in a home not far from his company's future headquarters in Nicholasville. He first went into business at age 11, when his paternal grandfather made him a 25% partner in a business hauling cattle, goods, and junk. According to a 2011 profile in Fortune, "high school utterly bored him"; he missed 105 of 173 possible school days during his senior year but still graduated in 1973.

== Business career ==
In 1973, immediately after graduating from high school, he started performing railroad construction jobs for L&N Railroad with a single backhoe and dump truck. He quickly developed a reputation for his fast and thorough work. Within a few years, another opportunity came when friends in the rail industry asked his company to step in and take over derailment work after a Columbus, Ohio, company that had done this work left the city. Throughout the next few years, Rick established a railroad construction company and then a derailment company under the banner of R. J. Corman. When larger railroads began contracting out their derailment and construction work in order to cut costs, Rick was able to provide them with the high-quality service that they were looking for. Though the early years of the business were financially difficult, Corman worked diligently to gain support for his companies. After Congress passed the Staggers Rail Act in 1980, Rick started a railroad company after he purchased the Bardstown Line. A year later, he began operating My Old Kentucky Dinner Train on that line using a car that had been part of the funeral procession for Dwight Eisenhower in 1969. Rick went on to establish six more companies and acquire eight more short lines with over 600 miles of track before his passing in 2013.

Although Corman technically retired in 1997, he remained intimately involved in his company's day-to-day affairs for the rest of his life. He spent his final years planning for the company's future after his death. While he received many purchase offers, he refused them all out of loyalty to his employees. His company continues to provide a variety of services for the railroads.

In 2011, BNSF Railway CEO Matt Rose said about Corman, "He's kind of like an oilfield firefighter. He's the Red Adair of the railroad industry."

== Personal life ==
Corman was married three times in all, and had five children. His two oldest, a daughter and a son, bear his name, but were born to a woman he never married. The three youngest, a son and two daughters, are from his third marriage. He spent the last 11 years of his life in a relationship with Tammie Taylor, an executive in his company.

He was also a significant University of Kentucky sports booster. In his final years, Corman became a close friend of UK men's basketball head coach John Calipari, who came to call him "a brother". Corman first met Calipari in 2009, when he sent one of his private jets to take Calipari and his wife from Memphis to Calipari's introductory press conference in Lexington. Shortly after Corman's death, Calipari recalled that they spent almost the entire flight "talking about anything other than basketball" once Corman made it clear he knew virtually nothing about the sport. Corman occasionally attended UK practices; Calipari noted that Corman was the only person he ever allowed into a UK practice wearing a red shirt, the color of UK's archrival, the University of Louisville. Corman's support was not limited to the men's basketball team; he also used a personal jet to deliver Mark Stoops to Lexington for his 2012 introduction as UK's new football head coach.

As a tribute to Corman, Calipari announced that he would wear red for at least one home game in the 2013–14 season.

== Illness and death ==
Corman was diagnosed with multiple myeloma in 2001, after feeling excruciating back pain while running in Amsterdam. He entrusted much of his care to Kathleen Martin, a Lexington gastroenterologist whom he had previously dated, and the two then set on a journey that eventually led to the Dana–Farber Cancer Institute in Boston. When they arrived at Dana–Farber, the institute's lead myeloma researcher told him, "If you come here, we will do everything possible to see that you grow old gracefully and die of something other than multiple myeloma." For the rest of his life, Corman contributed heavily to Dana–Farber, and also set up a trust to run his company following his death that reportedly had the institute as a beneficiary.

He had two bone marrow transplants as part of his treatment, the first in 2001 and the second in 2008. The cancer returned again in 2011; after a final turn for the worse in 2013, Corman died on August 23 at his home in Nicholasville.
