= Global TransPark =

Coordinates: 35°19′28″N 77°36′43″W

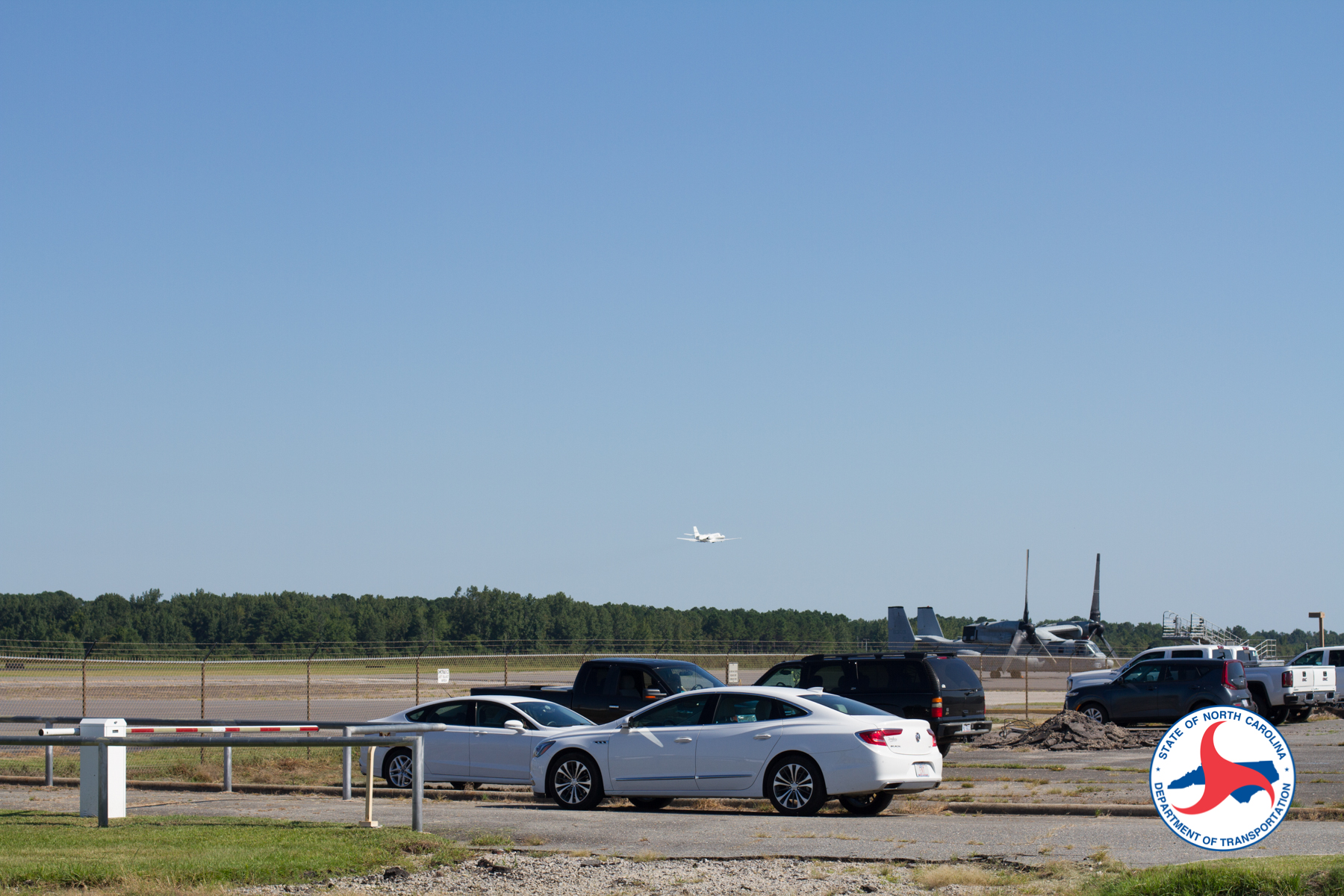
Global TransPark airstrip, 2019

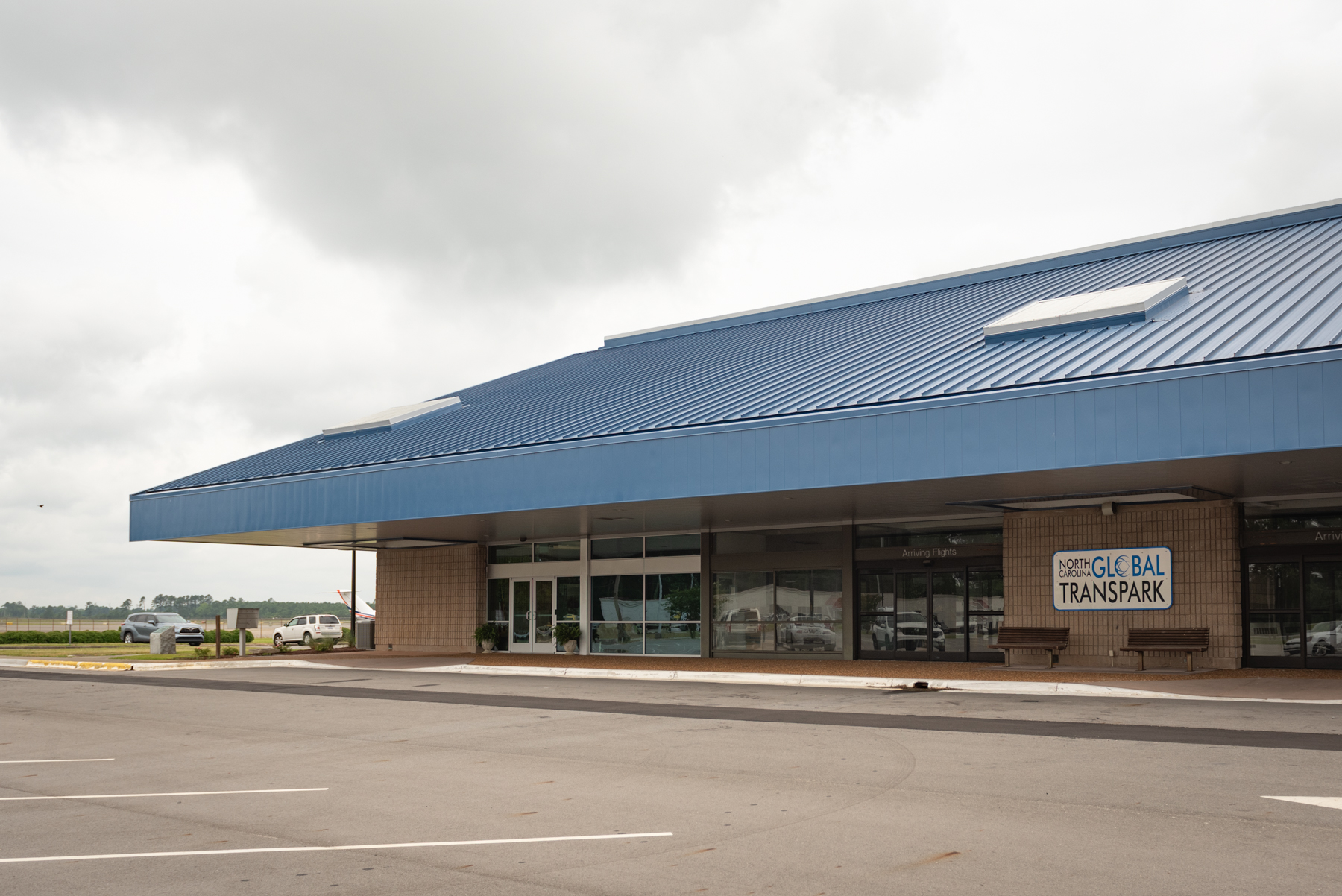
A building at the Global TransPark, 2023

The North Carolina Global TransPark (GTP) is a 2,500 acre, multi-modal industrial/airport site in Eastern North Carolina. As an agency of the State of North Carolina, the GTP is considered a key engine for driving the economy of Eastern North Carolina. The park offers access to multi-modal transportation options: air, rail, highways, and North Carolina's two international ports. The GTP is part of an economic development initiative in eastern North Carolina intended to spur transition in the region from an agricultural base to one of skilled labor and industrial manufacturing. Industries targeted by the GTP are aerospace, defense and logistics sectors.

== History ==
Around 1990, academic and member of the North Carolina Economic Future Study Commission John D. Kasarda proposed the creation of a site which combined air cargo transport infrastructure and manufacturing facilities. Under his plan, companies would fly-in unfinished goods and components to factories, complete or assemble them, then ship them away for distribution. North Carolina Governor Jim Martin supported the plan and proposed the development of a $250 million site with a two-mile runway and 5,000 acres zoned for industrial development.

In 1991 the North Carolina General Assembly voted to create the North Carolina Air Cargo Airport Authority, an independent agency. The authority scouted potential locations for the park throughout late 1991 and early 1992. Civic and political leaders in the urbanized Piedmont lobbied for the project to be located in their region of the state, arguing that it could benefit from the area's strong economy and, if it failed, the associated airstrip could be quickly repurposed to serve other needs. Some state leaders worried that Piedmont residents would oppose a large development as a nuisance. They also figured that rural areas in eastern North Carolina were in greater need of an economic development project.

In May 1992 the authority declared that the park would be developed at the lightly trafficked Kinston Jetport. Several eastern counties were placed in a development zone, and their residents would pay increased vehicle registration fees to help fund the project's development. It later acquired the name Global TransPark.

== Location ==
GTP is located approximately 30 minutes south of Greenville, North Carolina at the Kinston Regional Jetport (ISO) in Kinston, North Carolina. The airport runway has been extended to 11,500 feet (3,500 m), making it one of the longest commercial runways in the state. The park is centrally located on the mid-Atlantic seaboard and among North Carolina's six military installations. In May 1996, the Global TransPark was designated as Foreign Trade Zone 214. The designation means companies can export and import products through the TransPark without many of the usual customs restrictions and tariffs. Inspired by the Research Triangle Park to the west, GTP's growth has been similarly slow, although proponents maintain that in time the concept will prove successful.

== Features ==
Designed to attract industry and bring increased economic opportunities to the citizens of Eastern North Carolina and beyond, the GTP features more than 2,400 acres (9.7 km^{2}) available for shovel ready sites. The park also features an on-site Education & Training Center, now known as the Spirit Aerosystems Composite Center of Excellence. This on-site training facility offers classrooms, meeting rooms and composite labs for beginning or advance training. Workforce development programs are designed by Lenoir Community College based on each company's specific needs.

== Public services ==
The Global TransPark is also home to emergency services. The North Carolina Forestry Service, Highway Patrol and Emergency Management have established facilities at the TransPark. The GTP is the regional coordinating center activated to counter the destruction of natural disasters such as Hurricane Floyd in 1999 and Hurricane Irene in 2011.

== Manufacturing ==
Supporters of the Global TransPark point to recent success, such as the decision by Spirit AeroSystems of Wichita, Kansas, to locate a manufacturing plant there that will eventually employ more than 1,000 people. In 2008, Spirit said it will invest $570 million in the GTP project over the next six years. Spirit manufactures the center portion of the fuselage of the Airbus A350 Xtra WideBody airplane, which became operational in July 2010. State grants totaling about $125 million include a $5 million grant and more than $20 million, payable over 12 years, tied to the job creation attracted Spirit to North Carolina and the GTP. The Golden LEAF Foundation, which oversees North Carolina's share of tobacco-settlement money, also approved spending $100 million for Spirit's new building 500,000 square-foot facility.

In 2011, Spirit Aerosystems announced that it would be expanding its operations at the Global TransPark. The aerospace supplier will establish production for the Gulfstream 280 wing at its North Carolina facility. The company anticipates that 150-200 additional jobs will be created at the Global Transpark over the next 5 years as part of this work package.

== Logistics and transportation links ==
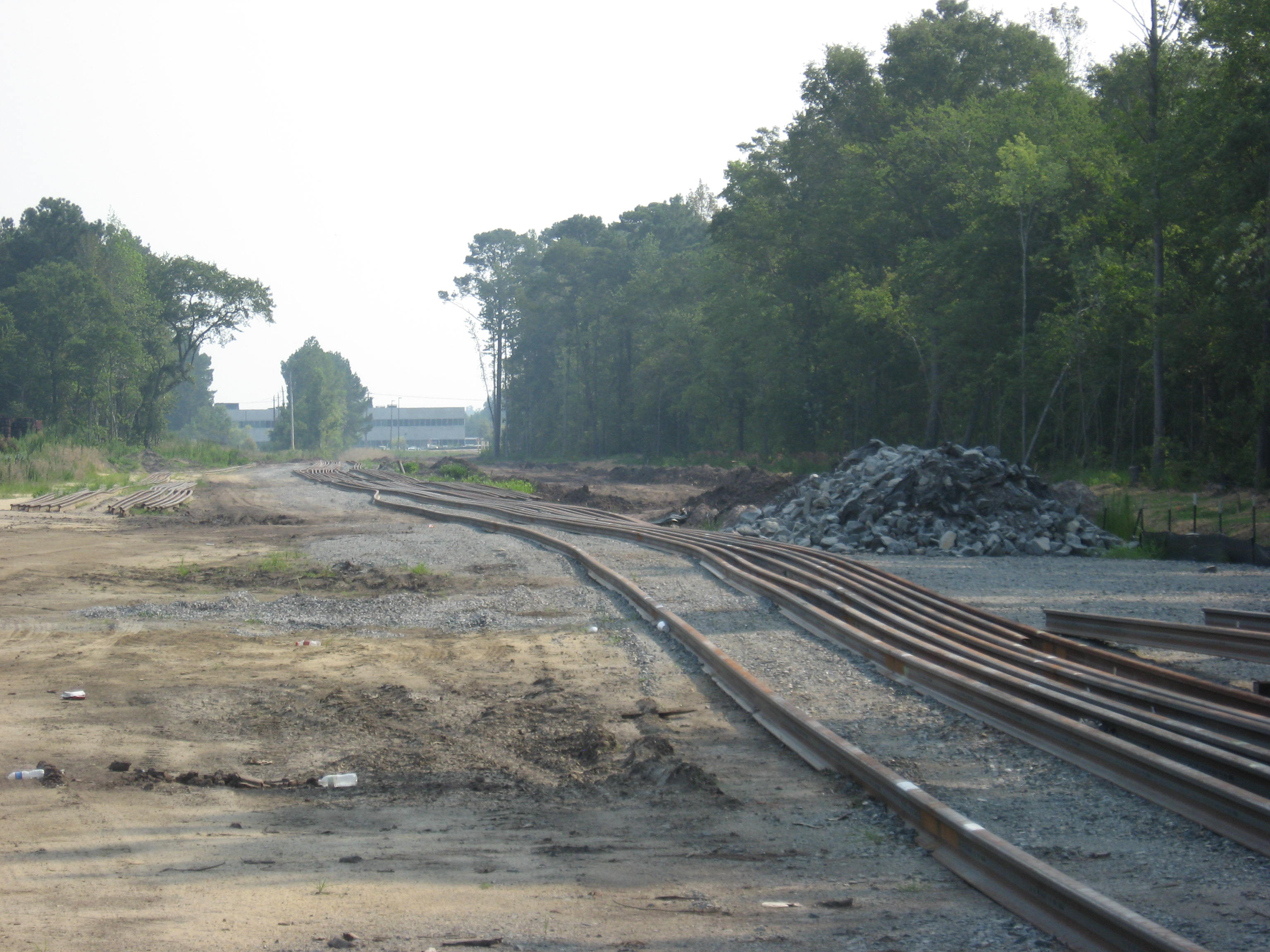
GTP rail spur construction facing east towards the Spirit Aerosystems manufacturing facility

The North Carolina Department of Transportation has committed to building a rail spur, plus several road improvements within the Global TransPark to allow Spirit and other tenants to receive, build and ship out aircraft and other industrial components. The rail spur will connect Spirit's manufacturing facilities, as well as other sites within the Global TransPark, to the North Carolina Railroad's east–west line that runs through the center of Kinston to the Port of Morehead City 75 miles east of the GTP. The rail spur is currently being constructed, with final completion expected by January 2012.

On several occasions, the Global TransPark has been noted as an up-and-coming site for business development and site selection. Southern Business & Development named the GTP one of its 10 outstanding logistics parks in the South. Site Selection magazine has consistently chosen North Carolina as the most business friendly state in the country, and has highlighted the Global TransPark's success in business recruiting.

Other companies to locate facilities at the Global TransPark in recent years include Mountain Air Cargo, Henley Aviation, Commerce Overseas Corp., Longistics, MJE Telestructure, Delta Private Jets, DB Schenker and Spatial Integrated Systems.

== Works cited ==
- Hood, John (2015). Catalyst: Jim Martin and the Rise of North Carolina Republicans. Winston-Salem: John F. Blair, Publisher. ISBN 9780895876577.
