= Gantt, Alabama =

- Town
- Location of Gantt in Covington County, Alabama.
- Coordinates: 31°24′33″N 86°29′03″W
- Country: United States
- State: Alabama
- County: Covington

Area
  - Total: 0.68 sq mi (1.77 km^{2})
  - Land: 0.65 sq mi (1.68 km^{2})
  - Water: 0.035 sq mi (0.09 km^{2})
- Elevation: 223 ft (68 m)

Population (2020)
  - Total: 196
  - Density: 301.7/sq mi (116.48/km^{2})
- Time zone: UTC-6 (Central (CST))
  - Summer (DST): UTC-5 (CDT)
- ZIP code: 36038
- Area code: 334
- FIPS code: 01-28936
- GNIS feature ID: 2406539
- Website: https://www.ganttal.com/

Gantt is a town in Covington County, Alabama, United States. At the 2020 census, the population was 196.

== Geography ==
Gantt is located in northern Covington County. According to the U.S. Census Bureau, the town has a total area of 0.69 square miles (1.8 km^{2}), of which 0.66 square miles (1.7 km^{2}) is land and 0.039 square miles (0.1 km^{2}), or 4.89%, is water. Gantt is located along the west bank of the Conecuh River, at the dam forming Gantt Lake.

== Demographics ==
Historical population
Census	Pop.	Note	%±
1970	270		—
1980	314		16.3%
1990	265		−15.6%
2000	241		−9.1%
2010	222		−7.9%
2020	196		−11.7%
U.S. Decennial Census; 2013 Estimate

As of the census of 2000, there were 241 people, 101 households, and 62 families residing in the town. The population density was 374.0 inhabitants per square mile (144.4/km^{2}). There were 125 housing units at an average density of 194.0 per square mile (74.9/km^{2}). The racial makeup of the town was 75.93% White, 21.99% Black or African American, 0.83% Native American, 0.41% from other races, and 0.83% from two or more races. 0.83% of the population were Hispanic or Latino of any race.

There were 101 households, out of which 31.7% had children under the age of 18 living with them, 45.5% were married couples living together, 11.9% had a female householder with no husband present, and 38.6% were non-families. 34.7% of all households were made up of individuals, and 20.8% had someone living alone who was 65 years of age or older. The average household size was 2.39 and the average family size was 3.11.

In the town, the population was spread out, with 29.0% under the age of 18, 3.7% from 18 to 24, 24.1% from 25 to 44, 21.2% from 45 to 64, and 22.0% who were 65 years of age or older. The median age was 40 years. For every 100 females, there were 95.9 males. For every 100 females age 18 and over, there were 85.9 males.

The median income for a household in the town was $25,536, and the median income for a family was $40,250. Males had a median income of $32,250 versus $18,750 for females. The per capita income for the town was $12,850. About 15.5% of families and 19.2% of the population were below the poverty line, including 23.0% of those under the age of eighteen and 15.4% of those 65 or over.

== Education ==
It is within the Covington County Board of Education school district.
