= Alabama and Florida Railroad (1898–1900) =

Historic railroad in Alabama

The Alabama and Florida Railroad (A&F RR) started construction in the late 19th century of a railroad from Georgiana, Alabama to Graceville, Florida. It had completed 28 miles of the line to River Falls, Alabama by 1899. The A&F RR leased the completed section of track to the Louisville and Nashville Railroad (L&N RR) that year. The next year the A&F RR sold both the completed section and the unbuilt right-of-way from River Falls to Graceville to the L&N RR. The L&N RR completed the line to Graceville in 1902.
