= R.J. Corman Railroad Group =

American railroad company

R. J. Corman Railroad Group
- Type: Private
- Industry: Rail transport
- Founded: 1973
- Founder: Richard J. Corman
- Headquarters: Nicholasville, Kentucky, U.S.
- Area served: United States
- Key people: Justin Broyles (President)
- Services: Track Construction/Maintenance; Signaling; Emergency Services; Dinner Train; Distribution Services; Equipment Rental; Material Sales; Locomotive; Short Line Railroad Operations; Storm Team; Switching
- Revenue: ▲US$ 300 million (FY 2011)
- Number of employees: Approx. 1600
- Website: www.rjcorman.com

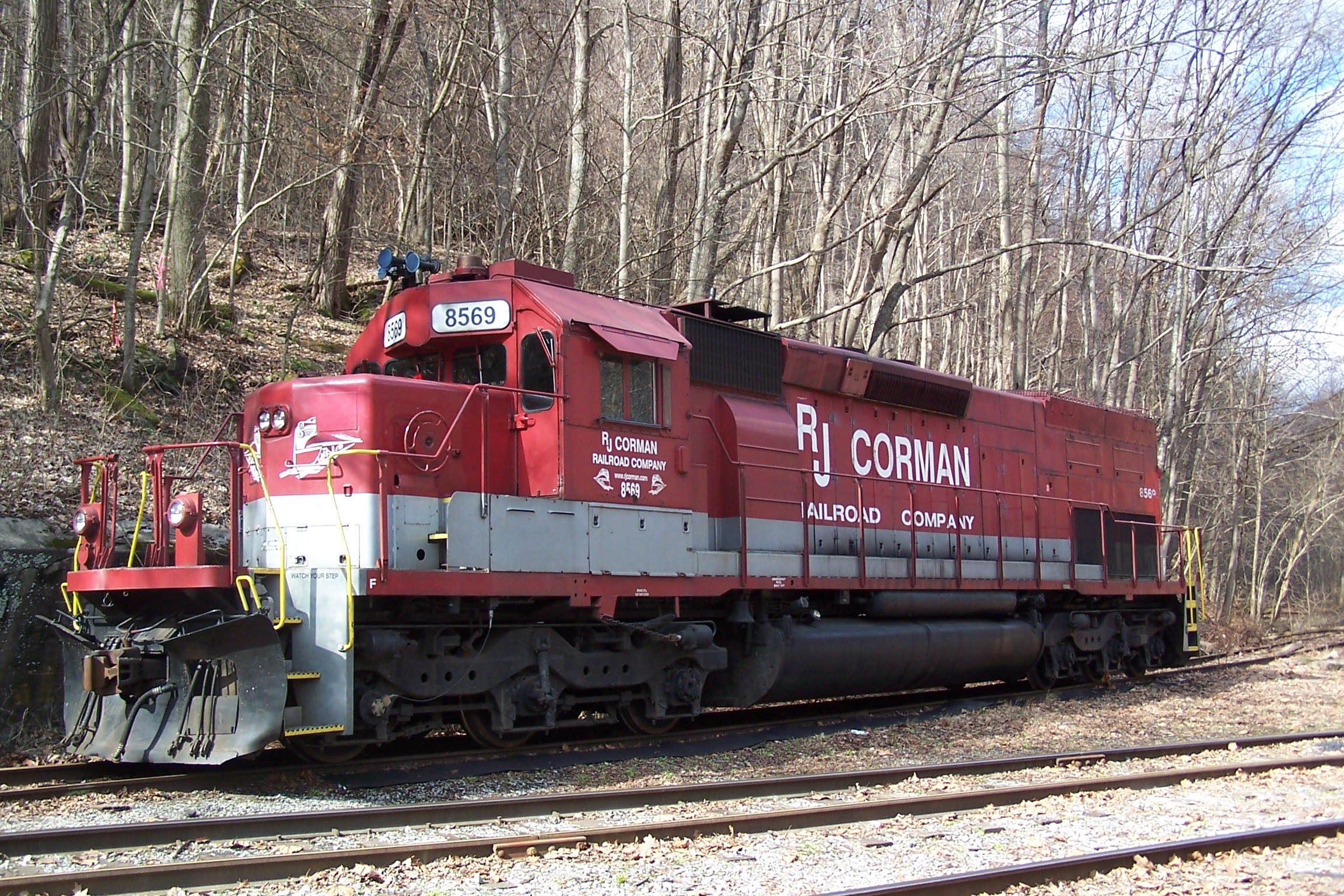
An R.J. Corman EMD SD40T-2 locomotive in Thurmond, West Virginia in February 2008

R. J. Corman Railroad Group, LLC is a privately owned railroad services and short line operating company headquartered in Nicholasville, Kentucky, with field locations in 22 states. It was owned by Richard J. Corman, who established the company in 1973, and ran it until his death on August 23, 2013. The company owns nineteen short-line railroads spanning Indiana, Kentucky, Mississippi, North Carolina, Ohio, Pennsylvania, South Carolina, Tennessee, Texas, and West Virginia.

The company serves all six Class I railroads, many regional and short line railroads as well as various rail-served industries. These operations encompass an array of services, including: railroad construction, short line railroad operations, industrial switching services, emergency response, track material logistics, distribution centers, signal design and construction, and an excursion dinner train.

== History ==
=== 20th century ===
R. J. Corman Railroad Construction was founded in 1973, by Richard J. Corman. In 1983, R. J. Corman Derailment Services was founded and opened its first division in Columbus, Ohio. From 1997 to 2000, eight more Derailment Services divisions were opened across the Northeast and Midwest U.S.

The company's original headquarters, Jay Station, was completed and opened in Nicholasville, Kentucky. The property was dedicated to Rick's father, Jay Corman.

R. J. Corman began operating short line railroads in 1987, with the purchase of the Bardstown Line and the Memphis Line. The company continued to acquire and rehabilitate many lines throughout the 1990s. They've reopened many railbanked lines, and, in 2008, began work to reopen a fully-abandoned non-railbanked corridor in Pennsylvania to serve a new industrial park, landfill and quarry.

The Bardstown Line became home to My Old Kentucky Dinner Train, which made its inaugural run in 1989.

In 1990, R. J. Corman's first Distribution Center was opened in South Union, Kentucky.

R. J. Corman Material Sales began in 1994, after the company agreed to begin serving as Conrail's full-service track and rail material distributor.

=== 21st century ===
In 2001, R. J. Corman launched its Railroad Switching company.

From 2003 to 2004, R. J. Corman's runway, Lucas Field, was constructed in Nicholasville, Kentucky. With that project's completion, R. J. Corman Aircraft Maintenance was launched.

R. J. Corman Railroad Group announced on June 18, 2009, that it had acquired the assets of Railpower Technologies Corp and its U.S. subsidiary, Railpower Hybrid Technologies.

Fortune Magazine released a feature story on Rick Corman, an American classic self-made success.

On April 1, 2013, R. J. Corman Signaling was formed and began operations.

Rick Corman died on August 23, 2013, after an 11-year battle with multiple myeloma.

== Lines owned ==
R. J. Corman operates the following subsidiaries:

- R. J. Corman Railroad/Allentown Lines (Pennsylvania)
- R. J. Corman Railroad/Bardstown Line (Kentucky)
- R. J. Corman Railroad/Central Kentucky Lines (Kentucky)
- R. J. Corman Railroad/Carolina Lines (North and South Carolina)
- R. J. Corman Railroad/Cleveland Line (Ohio)
- R. J. Corman Railroad/Memphis Line (Kentucky and Tennessee)
- R. J. Corman Railroad/Pennsylvania Lines (Pennsylvania)
- R. J. Corman Railroad/Raleigh & Fayetteville Railroad (North Carolina)
- R. J. Corman Railroad/Tennessee Terminal (Mississippi and Tennessee)
- R .J. Corman Railroad/Texas Line (Texas)
- R. J. Corman Railroad/Western Ohio Line (Indiana and Ohio)
- R. J. Corman Railroad/West Virginia Line (West Virginia)
- Nashville and Eastern Railroad, Nashville & Western Railroad and Transit Solution Group; operations acquired by R.J. Corman in January, 2019
- Owego and Harford Railway, Lehigh Railway and Luzerne and Susquehanna Railway; agreement to acquire announced on August 19, 2020
- Knoxville & Cumberland Gap Railroad

== Services and operations ==
R. J. Corman offers services such as: railroad construction, short line railroad operations, industrial switching services, emergency response, track material logistics, distribution centers, signal design and construction, and an excursion dinner train, My Old Kentucky Dinner Train.
