= Pioneer Lines =

Former American rail holding company

Coordinates: 39°36′44″N 104°53′35″W

- Industry: Rail transport
- Predecessor: Pioneer Railcorp
- Founded: January 30, 1986; 40 years ago
- Founder: Guy L. Brenkman
- Defunct: September 14, 2022; 4 years ago
- Fate: Acquired by Patriot Rail Company
- Successor: Patriot Rail Company
- Headquarters: Greenwood Village, Colorado, United States
- Website: pioneerlines.com

Pioneer Lines (formerly Pioneer Railcorp) was a holding company for a number of American short-line railroads. Other subsidiaries offered locomotive and freight car leasing to its own railroads and to third parties, and also freight car cleaning. Pioneer Lines also had interests in real estate and newsletter publishing. It was previously owned by BRX Transportation Holdings starting in 2019.

The company, originally named Pioneer Railroad Company, was founded on January 30, 1986 by Guy L. Brenkman. The company raised the capital for its first acquisition through a self-underwritten public stock offering. It continued this method of raising capital for subsequent acquisitions.

Almost all of the short lines owned by Pioneer are lines spun off by Class I railroads.

On August 8, 2022 Patriot Rail Company announced its intention to acquire Pioneer Lines. The company was acquired by Patriot Rail on September 14, 2022.

== Railroad subsidiaries ==
Pioneer Lines formerly operated 15 railroads in 12 states:

- Decatur Junction Railway (DT)
- Elkhart and Western Railroad (EWR)
- Fort Smith Railroad (FSR)
- Garden City Western Railway (GCW)
- Georgia Southern Railway (GS)
- Gettysburg and Northern Railroad (GET)
- Indiana Southwestern Railway (ISW)
- Kendallville Terminal Railway (KTR)
- Keokuk Junction Railway (KJRY)
- Michigan Southern Railroad (MSO)
- Mississippi Central Railroad (MSCI)
- Napoleon, Defiance & Western Railroad (NDW) (formerly the Maumee and Western)
- Pioneer Industrial Railway (PRY)
- Ripley and New Albany Railroad (RNAB)
- Vandalia Railroad (VRRC)

== Former railroads ==
- Alabama and Florida Railway (AF) - Line totally abandoned in 2011.
- Alabama Railroad (ALAB) - Line sold to Alabama Railroad LLC in 2020
- Shawnee Terminal Railway (STR) (Out of service)
- West Michigan Railroad (WMI) - Line partially abandoned in 2012, then sold to the Hamilton Hartford Group on November 3, 2015.
