= Mobile and Girard Railroad =

Railroad in Alabama, USA

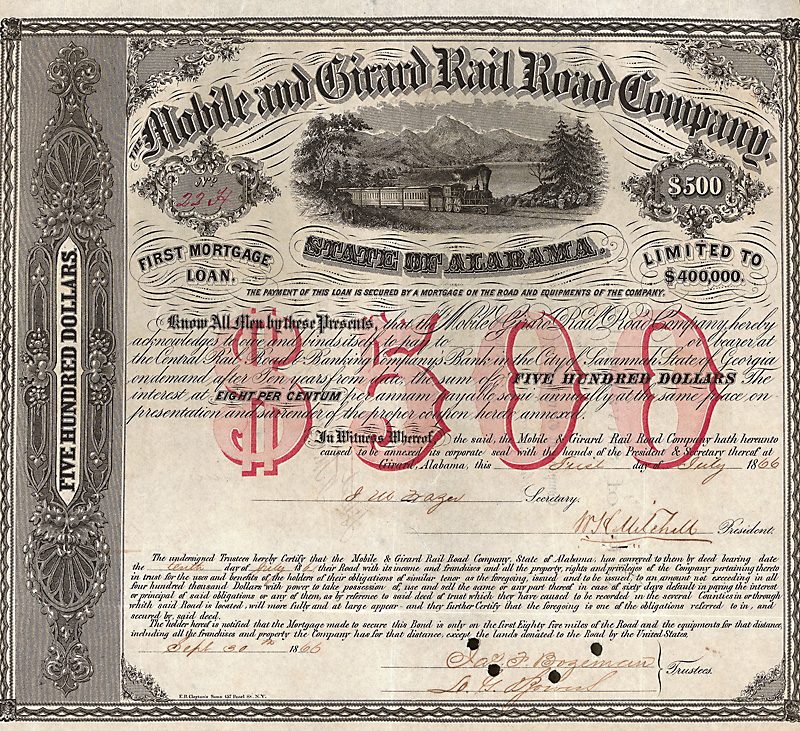
Bond of the Mobile and Girard Rail Road Company from the 1st July 1866

The Mobile & Girard Railroad was an Alabama railroad which was constructed in the mid-19th century; a portion of the line continues in operation under different ownership. The 26-mile (42 km) line was constructed with a track gauge of 5 ft (1,524 mm).

== Construction ==
In 1852, Alabama was granted a right of way across US government lands from Girard, Alabama (across the Chattahoochee River from Columbus, Georgia) to Mobile Bay. Construction of the railroad began in 1854, and by October 1 of that year, cars were running on the first nine miles of track, to Fort Mitchell, and to Guerryton by mid-1855. But construction of the 13 miles from Guerryton to Union Springs. was delayed, and was not complete until November, 1859. The line was completed to Troy in 1870 and later as far as Andalusia.

The plan for Mobile to be the end point was in doubt as early as 1857 when it was determined that it would cost four times as much to complete to Mobile as it would to Pensacola. Also, Mobile had never made payment on its subscription to the railroad.

In 1879, the Central of Georgia Railroad expanded into Alabama with the purchase of the Montgomery & Eufaula Railroad. Several Alabama shortlines were thereafter acquired, including the M&G. The Central of Georgia became part of the Southern Railway in 1963; Southern and Norfolk & Western Railway merged to form Norfolk Southern in 1982. NS gradually abandoned the former M&G line. First from Andalusia to Goshen in 1986, and then from Troy to Hurtsboro in 1988.

== Pine Belt Southern shortline operation ==
Pine Belt Southern Railroad purchased the remaining line from the NS interchange at Nuckols (Milepost S-304.00) to Hurtsboro (Milepost S-329.00) on July 27, 1995. Traffic on the line was 95% sand (US Silica Company west of downtown Hurtsboro), 4% logs, and 1% inbound finished lumber.

== Pine Belt Southern abandonment ==
After the sand distributor that accounted for the overwhelming majority of traffic on the line lost its key rail supplied customer, the line was found to no longer be economically viable. The last train operated over the line in 2000. On May 1, 2002, PBRR filed a Notice of Exemption with the Surface Transportation Board for abandonment of the line. Though the Macon County Commission was granted a public use condition by the STB to explore acquisition of the right of way for public use, the line officially abandoned on June 1, 2003. The ties and rails were removed though the roadbed remains.

== Conecuh Valley Railroad operation ==
The Conecuh Valley Railroad continues to operate the last remaining 12 miles (19 km) of the M&G between Goshen and Troy, interchanging with CSX at Troy. From 1988 to 2001 this line segment was operated by the Southern Alabama Railroad Company.
