= Southeast Alabama =

Region of Alabama

Coordinates: 31°50′N 85°57′W

Southeast Alabama is the term used to identify the southeastern counties in the U.S. state of Alabama. Other names for the area are The Wiregrass and Lower Alabama. The area includes the Counties of Dale, Pike, Houston, Coffee, Henry, Geneva, Barbour, Crenshaw and Covington. The area is dominated by the most populous cities of Dothan, Alabama (pop. 69,000), Enterprise, Alabama (pop. 28,000), Troy, Alabama (pop. 19,000) and Ozark, Alabama (pop. 15,000).

== See also ==
- Lower Alabama
