= List of reporting marks: A =

Note: Marks ending in U are for container owners; marks ending in X are not common carriers; marks ending in Z are for trailers without flanged wheels. All other marks are of common-carrier railroads.

== Common carriers (operating railroads) ==
A	Alton Railroad
AA	Ann Arbor Railroad (1895-1976) → Ann Arbor Railroad (1988)
A&A	Anniston and Atlantic Railroad
AAR	Association of American Railroads
AB	Akron Barberton Cluster Railway
ABB	Akron and Barberton Belt Railroad
ABCK	Alaska British Columbia Transportation Company
ABEC	Aberdeen Electric Company
ABL	Alameda Belt Line
ABM	Texas and Pacific Railway → Missouri Pacific Railroad
ABN	Alabama Northern Railway → Ashland Railway
ABPR	Aberdeen and Briar Patch Railway → Aberdeen, Carolina and Western Railway
ABR	Athens Line
ABS	Alabama Southern Railroad
AC	Algoma Central and Hudson Bay Railway → Algoma Central Railway
ACBL	American Commercial Barge Lines
ACIS	Algoma Central Railway
ACJR	Ashtabula, Carson and Jefferson Railroad
ACL	Atlantic Coast Line Railroad → Seaboard Coast Line Railroad → Seaboard System Railroad → CSX Transportation
ACRC	Andalusia and Conecuh Railroad
ACWR	Aberdeen, Carolina and Western Railway
ACY	Akron, Canton and Youngstown Railroad → Norfolk and Western Railway → Norfolk Southern Railway
AD	Atlantic and Danville Railway → Norfolk, Franklin and Danville Railway
ADBF	Adrian and Blissfield Railroad
ADIR	Adirondack Railway
ADN	Ashley, Drew and Northern Railway → Arkansas, Louisiana and Mississippi Railroad
AE	Arizona Eastern Railroad
AEC	Atlantic and East Carolina Railway
AEFR	Aurora, Elgin and Fox River Electric
AER	Algoma Eastern Railway
AERC	Albany and Eastern Railroad
AF	Alabama and Florida Railway
AFLR	Alabama and Florida Railroad
AG	Abbeville-Grimes Railway → A&G Railroad → Bay Line Railroad
AGCR	Alamo Gulf Coast Railroad
AGE	Albertson Great Eastern Railroad
AGLF	Atlantic and Gulf Railroad → Knoxville and Holston River Railroad
AGR	Alabama and Gulf Coast Railway
AGRD	A&G Railroad
AGS	Alabama Great Southern Railroad
A&GW	Alberta and Great Waterways Railway
AHMR	Arlington Heights Motor Railway
AHGX	American Heritage Girls
AHT	Alaska Hydro-Train
AHW	Ahnapee and Western Railway → Fox Valley and Western Ltd.
AIRI	Alabama Industrial Railroad
AJ	Alma and Jonquieres Railway
AJR	Artemus-Jellico Railroad
AKC	Arkansas Central Railroad
AKDN	Acadiana Railway
AKMD	Arkansas Midland Railroad
AL	Almanor Railroad
ALAB	Alabama Railroad
AL&G	Arkansas, Louisiana and Gulf Railway
ALLN	Allentown and Auburn Railroad
ALM	Arkansas and Louisiana Midland Railway → Arkansas and Louisiana Missouri Railway → Arkansas, Louisiana and Mississippi Railroad
ALQS	Aliquippa and Southern Railroad
ALS	Alton and Southern Railroad → Alton and Southern Railway
ALT	Airlake Terminal Railway
ALU	Alcolu Railroad
ALY	Allegheny Railroad → Allegheny and Eastern Railroad
A&M	Alabama and Mississippi Railroad
AM	Arkansas and Missouri Railroad
AMC	Amador Central Railroad
AMHR	Amherst Industries → Landisville Railroad
AMID	Alabama Midland Railway
AMR	Arcata and Mad River Railroad
AMT	Agence métropolitaine de transport (Montréal, Québec)
AMTK	Amtrak (National Railroad Passenger Corporation)
AN	Apalachicola Northern Railroad → AN Railway
ANC	Atlantic and North Carolina Railroad
ANE	Abbotsford and Northeastern Railroad
AN&N	Anthony and Northern Railway
ANR	Angelina and Neches River Railroad
ANY	Athabasca Northern Railway
AO	Appalachian and Ohio Railroad
AOK	Arkansas-Oklahoma Railroad
AOR	Aliquippa and Ohio River Railroad
APA	Apache Railway
APD	Albany Port District
APNC	Appanoose County Community Railroad
AR	Aberdeen and Rockfish Railroad
ARA	Arcade and Attica Railroad
ARC	Alexander Railroad
ARDP	Missouri Pacific Railroad → Union Pacific Railroad
ARE	A&R Line
ARMD	Arnaud Railway
ARMH	Missouri Pacific Railroad → Union Pacific Railroad
ARMN	Missouri Pacific Railroad → Union Pacific Railroad
ARN	Alberta RailNet → Canadian National Railway
ARR	Alaska Railroad
ARRG	Altra Railroad
ARS	Arkansas Southern Railroad
ART	American Refrigerator Transit Company
ARW	Arkansas Western Railway
ARZC	Arizona and California Railroad
AS	Abilene and Southern Railway → Missouri Pacific Railroad
A&SA	Atlanta and St. Andrews Bay Railway
ASAB	Atlanta and St. Andrews Bay Railway → Bay Line Railroad
ASDA	Asbestos and Danville Railway
ASML	Atlanta, Stone Mountain and Lithonia Railway
ASR	Allegheny Southern Railroad
ASRW	Allegheny Southern Railway
ASRY	Ashland Railway
AT	Auto Train
ATCO	Arnold Transit
ATLT	AT&L Railroad
ATN	Alabama & Tennessee River Railway
ATR	Alliance Terminal Railroad
ATRW	Anthracite Railway
ATSF	Atchison, Topeka and Santa Fe Railway → BNSF Railway
ATW	Atlantic and Western Railway
AUAR	Austin Area Terminal Railroad
AUG	Augusta Railroad
AUNW	Austin and Northwestern Railroad
AUS	Augusta Southern Railroad
AUS	Augusta and Summerville Railroad
AUT	Autauga Northern Railroad
A&V	Alabama and Vicksburg Railway
AVNE	Avera & Northeastern Railroad
AVL	Aroostook Valley Railroad
AVR	Allegheny Valley Railroad
AVRR	AG Valley Railroad
A&W	Alexandria and Western Railway
AW	Ahnapee and Western Railway
AWP	Atlanta and West Point Railroad → Seaboard System Railroad → CSX Transportation
AWRR	Austin Western Railroad
AWW	Algers, Winslow and Western Railway
AYSS	Allegheny and South Side Railway
AZER	Arizona Eastern Railway
AZS	Arizona Southern Railroad

== Others (assigned to companies or individuals who own railcars, but are not operating railroads) ==
AAAX	Ann Arbor Railroad (1895-1976) → Ann Arbor Railroad (1988)
AACX	Alaska Division of Agriculture)
AADX	Airco Alloys and Carbide
AAEX	American Aniline and Extract Company
AAIX	ACS International Inc
AAKX	Amulco Asphalt Company
AALX	Advanced Aromatics
AAMX	Shippers' Car Line Division of ACF Industries; Arrendadora de Carros de Ferrocarril del Atlantico; Arrendadora de Carros de Ferrocarril
AARX	Association of American Railroads
AATX	Ampacet Corporation
AAX	American Agricultural Chemical Company; Agrico Chemical Company
ABBX	Abbott Labs
ABCX	American Bitumuls Company; Merchants Despatch Transportation Corporation; Falcon Coal Company; Tennessee Valley Authority
ABEX	Abbey Chemical Corporation; CPS Processing Corporation; CPS Chemical Company; Abbey Chemical Corporation; Advanced BioEnergy
ABGX	American Black Granite Company
ABIX	Anheuser-Busch
ABLX	American Refrigerator Transit Company
ABMX	Albers Brothers Milling Company
ABOX	American Rail Box Car Company; Railbox Company; TTX Company
ABPX	Ashland By-Product Coke Company; Animal By-Products Corporation
ABRX	Merchants Despatch Transportation Corporation; AB Rail Investments, Inc.; Railmark Holdings, Inc.
ABSX	American Beet Sugar Company; American Crystal Sugar Company; Albert Brothers Inc
ABTX	Aubrey Bartlett; North American Car Corporation; General Electric Railcar Services Corp.
ABWX	Asea Brown Boveri, Inc.
ABX	Adirondack Bottled Gas Corporation; Home Gas Corporation of Great Barrington
ACAX	Aluminum Company of America; Allied Chemical Canada; Allied Chemical Corporation; Honeywell International
ACBX	Scandinavian Oil Company; American Cast Iron Pipe Company
ACCX	Ansul Chemical Company; Consolidation Coal Company
ACDX	Allied Chemical Corporation; First Union Properties; Allied Chemical Corporation; Allied Signal; Honeywell International
ACEX	Atlantic City Electric Power Company; Atlantic Cement Company; Blue Circle Atlantic; Ace Cogeneration Company
ACFX	ACF Industries; General Electric Rail Services Corporation; Wells Fargo Rail
ACGX	Acme Gas Corporation; Suburban Propane, LP
ACIX	Arkansas Chemicals, Inc.; Great Lakes Chemical Corporation
ACJU	American Coastal Lines Joint Venture, Inc.
ACLU	Atlantic Container Line, Ltd.
ACLX	American Car Line Company
ACMX	Allis-Chalmers Corporation; Voith Hydro
ACNU	AKZO Chemie, B V
ACOU	Associated Octel Company, Ltd.
ACOX	Aurora Cooperative Elevator Company (grain shippers)
ACPX	Amoco Canada Petroleum Company, Ltd.; Amoco Oil Company; Union Tank Car Lines
ACPZ	American Concrete Products Company
ACRX	American Chrome and Chemicals, Inc.; Elementis Chromium, LP
ACSU	Atlantic Cargo Services, AB
ACSX	First Union Properties, Inc.; Honeywell International
ACSZ	American Carrier Equipment
ACTU	Associated Container Transport (Australia), Ltd.
ACTX	Allied Chemical Corporation; Honeywell International
ACUU	Acugreen Limited
ACWZ	Union Pacific Railroad
ACXU	Atlantic Cargo Services, AB
ACXX	Anderson Columbia Company, Inc.
ACZX	A C Railroad Service Company, Norfolk Southern Railway Company
ADCU	Flexi-Van Leasing, Inc.
ADCX	Adolph Coors Company
ADIX	Adirondack Railway Preservation Society (Adirondack Scenic Railroad)
ADKU	AGA A/S
ADMX	Archer Daniels Midland
ADRX	Addeleston Recycling Corporation
ADSX	Andrew Merrilees, Ltd.
AECX	Associated Electric Cooperative, Inc.
AEIX	Alan Eslisk
AEIZ	Farrell Lines, Inc.
AEPU	American Lines, Inc.
AEPX	American Electric Power Service Corporation
AEQX	ATEL Equipment Corporation
AESX	A. E. Staley Manufacturing; GE Railcar Services Corporation
AEVX	AKZO Coatings, Inc.
AEX	The Andersons
AFCU	Afram Lines, Inc.
AFCX	Atel Capital Equipment Fund
AFCZ	Afram Lines, Inc.
AFEX	Farmers Elevator Company of Arthur, ND
AFFX	AFFCAR, Inc.
AFIU	ABS Industrial Verification, Inc.
AFIZ	Agmark Foods
AFPX	Fibers and Plastics Company (Allied Corporation); Honeywell International
AFRX	AF Railway Industries, Inc.
AFSX	Astoria, LLC
AFTX	American Freedom Train
AGCX	Alberta Gas Chemicals, Inc.; PROCOR
AGEX	A. G. Pipe Lines, Inc.; Nova Chemicals, Ltd.
AGFX	Anchor Gas and Fuel Company, Inc.
AGHX	Agrium US, Inc.
AGIX	AGRI Financial Services, Inc.; AGRI Industries
AGLX	Andrews Gas Liquids Service; Andrews Petroleum
AGMX	Terra Nitrogen, LP
AGPX	AG Processing, Inc.
AGRX	Agrifos, LLC
AGYX	American Gypsum Company; Centrex Construction Products, Inc.
AHCX	Arcadian Corporation
AHMX	Altos Homos de Mexico, SA de CV
AHWZ	Fox Valley and Western
AICX	Hoeganaes Corporation
AIDU	Albermarle Corporation
AIEU	Aviation Import Export, Inc.
AIIZ	III Transportation
AIMX	American Iron & Metal Company
AINX	TTX Company (Acorn Division)
AIPX	Atlas Iron Processors, Inc.
AITU	Western Intermodal
AJCU	Australia Japan Container Line
AJPX	North American Chemical Company; IMC Chemicals
AKFX	AKF Corporation
AKLU	K Line
AKMX	Helm Financial Corporation
AKZX	Azko Nobel Chemicals, Inc.
ALAX	Lyondell Petrochemical; Equistar Chemicals, LP
ALBX	Albert City Elevator
ALCX	Aluminum Company of Canada, Ltd.; Alcan Smelters and Chemicals, Ltd.
ALEX	AGRI Financial Services, Inc.; AGRI Industries
ALGX	Amsterdam Leasing
ALKX	Airlake Terminal Railway Company
ALLX	Alliance Machine Company
ALLZ	Alliance Shippers
ALMX	Trinity Rail Management, Inc.
ALNX	Government of Alberta
ALPX	Government of Alberta
ALRX	A and R Leasing, LLP
ALSX	Albis Canada, Inc.
ALTU	VTG Vereinigte Tanklage U Transportmittel, GMBH
ALTX	Southern Illinois Railcar, Inc.
ALUX	Alumax of South Carolina, Inc.
ALWX	GE Railcar Services Corporation
AMAX	AMAX Coal Company
AMBU	Amber Line, Inc.
AMBX	Amherst Industries, Inc.; American Boiler Works, Inc.
AMCX	Amoco Chemicals Corporation; Amoco Oil Company; BP Amoco Chemical Company (Chemical Division)
AMCZ	Interbulk, Inc.
AMEX	Albamex; Allied Enterprises
AMFU	Amphibious Container Leasing, Ltd.
AMGX	AMG Resources Corporation
AMIU	American Marine Industries
AMIX	Railcar Leasing Specialists, Inc.
AMIZ	American Marine Industries
AMLX	American Railcar Company
AMMU	Hyundai
AMMX	Amoco Minerals Company; Kentucky-Tennessee Clay Company
AMNX	American Railcar Leasing Partners
AMOX	Amoco Oil Company; BP Products North America, Inc.
AMOZ	American Oil Company
AMPX	GE Railcar Services Corporation
AMRU	Alaska Marine Lines, Inc.
AMRX	Consolidated Oil and Transportation Company, Inc.
AMRZ	American Chassis Leasing, Inc.
AMSX	AllTrans Management Services Corporation
AMTZ	Amtrak
AMWX	Amway Corporation
AMXU	Americas Marine Express, Inc.
ANAU	Alliance Navigation Line, Inc.
ANAX	Excel Railcar Corporation; GE Rail Services Corporation
ANBX	Anbel Corporation
ANCX	Norit Americas, Inc.
ANDX	Andesite Rock Company
ANIX	Associacion National de la Industria Quimca, A.C.
ANKX	A and K Railroad Materials, Inc.
ANSX	Ansco Investment Company
AOCU	Associated Octel
AOCX	Aluminum Company of America (Alcoa)
AOEX	American Orient Express Railway
AOIX	Marathon Ashland Petroleum Company
AOKX	Greenbrier Management Services, LLC
AOUX	Alberta and Orient Glycol Company, Ltd.
APAX	West Penn Power Company; Cementos Apasco, SA de CV
APAXX	Cementos Apasco, SA de CV
APCU	American President Lines, Ltd.
APCX	Allied Products Company; Allied Lime Company
APEX	Apex Tank Car Line
APHX	Air Products Polymers, LP
APIX	The Commonwealth Plan, Inc.
APLU	American President Lines, Ltd.
APLX	APL Land Transport Services, Inc.
APLZ	American President Lines, Ltd.
APMU	Maersk Lines
APMX	Air Products Manufacturing Company
APMZ	Maersk Equipment Service Company
APOX	Alabama Power Company
APRX	Air Products
APSX	Arizona Public Service Company
APTX	Air Products
APWX	Appalachian Power Company
APXX	Alberta Prairie Railway Excursions
AQCX	Aqua-Chem, Inc. (Celaver Brooks Division)
ARCX	Alaska Rail Car Company; Arizona Rail Car, Inc.
ARDU	CATU Containers, SA
AREX	Aeropres Corporation
ARGX	Associated Railcar, Inc.
ARHU	CATU Containers, SA
ARHX	Arch Mineral Corporation
ARIX	Arco Industrial Gases (a division of Arco, Inc.); GE Rail Services Corporation
ARJX	Arch Chemicals
ARL	Armour Refrigerator Line (expired)
ARMH	Missouri Pacific Railroad; Texas-New Mexico Railway; Doniphan, Kensett and Searcy Railway; Missouri Pacific Railroad; Union Pacific Railroad
ARMN	Missouri Pacific Railroad; Union Pacific Railroad
ARMX	American Rail and Marine Corporation
ARMZ	Armasal Line
AROX	GATX Corporation
ARPX	Arco Petroleum Products Company; BP Products North America, Inc.
ARRX	Anaconda Minerals Company; Anthracite Railroads Historical Society, Inc.
ARSX	Aristech Chemical Corporation; Sunoco, Inc.
ARTU	CATU Containers, SA
ARWX	Alabama River Woodlands, Inc.
ASCX	Algoma Steel Corporation; Armco Steel Company, LP
ASDX	Allied Services
ASGX	American Steel Foundries, Inc.
ASHU	Anchorage Sand and Gravel Company; Ash Grove Cement Company
ASHC	Maritainer France, SA
ASHX	General American Transportation Corporation; American Soda, LLP
ASLX	Algoma Steamships, Ltd.
ASMX	Ames And Sons Machine Works
ASRX	Amstar Corporation; Domino Sugar Company
ASRZ	Agri/Share Cooperative
ASTX	ASARCO
ASYX	Avondale Shipyards, Inc.
ATAX	Arizona Transit Assembly; Alameda Corridor Transportation Authority
ATCX	Austin and Texas Central Railroad (Operations division of the Austin Steam Train Association)
ATEX	Asplundh Tree Expert Company (Railroad Division)
ATGU	Burlington Northern and Santa Fe Railway; BNSF Railway
ATGX	ATEL Leasing Corporation
ATIU	Societe Auxillaire De Transport Et D'Industries
ATIX	Alstom Transportation, Inc.
ATLU	American Marine Industries
ATLX	Atlas Machine and Iron Works, Inc.
ATLZ	American Marine Industries
ATMX	United States Department of Energy (Albuquerque Operations Office)
ATOU	Atochem
ATTX	Trailer Train Company; TTX Corporation
AUBX	US Plastic Lumber, Ltd.
AVCX	AVCO Aerostructures Division
AVLU	Allied Van Lines
AWCX	Airco Welding Products
AWDX	Atlantic of New York, Inc.
AWIX	Albright and Wilson Americas, Inc.
AWVX	20th Century Fox
AWXX	East Carbon Development Company
AWZZ	McCloud Railway Company
AXCU	Ace Transportation Company
AXXZ	Agricultural Express of America
AZCX	Azcon Corporation
AZEX	Arizona Electric Power Cooperative, Inc.
AZMX	Arizona Railway Museum
AZXX	Arizona Chemical Company
