= List of Superfund sites in Florida =

This is a list of Superfund sites in Florida designated under the Comprehensive Environmental Response, Compensation, and Liability Act (CERCLA) environmental law. The CERCLA federal law of 1980 authorized the United States Environmental Protection Agency (EPA) to create a list of polluted locations requiring a long-term response to clean up hazardous material contaminations. These locations are known as Superfund sites, and are placed on the National Priorities List (NPL).

The NPL guides the EPA in "determining which sites warrant further investigation" for environmental remediation. As of May 3, 2010, there were 52 Superfund sites on the National Priorities List in Florida. Three more sites have been proposed for entry on the list and 23 others have been cleaned up and removed from it. There are also twelve Superfund Alternative sites in the state.

== Superfund sites ==
Proposed for addition to National Priorities List
Deleted from National Priorities List
Superfund Alternative site

CERCLIS ID	Name	County	Reason	Proposed	Listed	Construction completed	Partially deleted	Deleted
FLD980221857	Agrico Chemical Co.	Escambia	Soil and surface water contamination by fluoride, arsenic and lead and groundwater contamination by fluoride, arsenic, chloride, sulfate, nitrate/nitrite, radium-226 and radium-228 from former chemical and fertilizer manufacturing.	06/24/1988	10/04/1989	09/23/1999		
FLD004145140	Airco Plating Co.	Miami-Dade	Soil and groundwater contamination by metals, including cadmium and chromium, and VOCs, including PCE, DCE and vinyl chloride. There is a risk of contamination of the Biscayne Aquifer, the county's sole drinking water source.	06/24/1988	02/21/1990	09/15/1999		
FLD012978862	Alaric Area Groundwater Plume	Hillsborough	Groundwater contamination by PCE and TCE, including trace contamination of the Upper Floridan Aquifer, a major source of drinking water in the Tampa area. Contamination has also spread to the nearby Helena Chemical Superfund site.	02/04/2000	12/01/2000	09/30/2003		
FLD041495441	Alpha Chemical Corp.	Polk	Groundwater, soil and sediment contamination by VOCs, including xylene, styrene, ethylbenzene, benzoic acid and 1,2-dichloropropane from former industrial waste disposal practices.	12/30/1982	09/08/1983	09/21/1990		06/28/1995
FLD008161994	American Creosote Works (Pensacola Plt)	Escambia	Soil, sediment and groundwater are contaminated with VOCs, PAHs, PCP and dioxins from former wood treatment operations.	12/30/1982	09/08/1983			
FLD020536538	Anaconda Aluminum Co./Milgo Electronics	Miami-Dade	Groundwater was contaminated by cyanide and heavy metals, such as cadmium, lead, iron, zinc, selenium and copper from former on-site waste disposal practices. Sediment, soil and surface water contained heavy metals such as mercury, selenium and arsenic. Contamination reached the Biscayne Aquifer, the sole source of drinking water for south Florida.	10/26/1989	08/30/1990	11/22/1994		07/09/1998
FLD981014368	Anodyne, Inc.	Miami-Dade	Groundwater contamination by metals and VOCs and soil contaminated by metals from former manufacturing operations.	06/24/1988	02/21/1990			
FLSFN0406909	Arkla Terra Property	Hillsborough	Soil, groundwater and private drinking water wells are contaminated by PCE from tank cleaning.	06/29/2008	04/09/2009			
FLD004574190	B&B Chemical Co., Inc.	Miami-Dade	Soil and groundwater contamination by benzene, chlorobenzene and vinyl chloride from soakage pits. The site has impacted the Biscayne Aquifer, the sole source of drinking water in southern Florida.	06/24/1988	08/30/1990	10/01/1994		
FLD980494660	Beulah Landfill	Escambia	Groundwater contamination by PCP and soils and sludges contaminated by PAHs, pesticides, PCP and metals, including aluminum, zinc, iron, lead, chromium and nickel.	06/26/1988	02/21/1990	09/16/1993		06/22/1998
FLD052172954	BMI-Textron	Palm Beach	Soil was contaminated by cyanide and fluoride; groundwater was contaminated by arsenic, cyanide, fluoride and sodium.	06/24/1988	08/30/1990	08/11/1994		11/18/2002
FLD980847016	Brown's Dump	Duval	Soil contained elevated levels of lead, arsenic, other inorganic compounds, organic compounds, pesticides, PCBs, dioxins and furans. Remedial action is expected to start in 2010.					
FLD980728935	Brown Wood Preserving	Suwannee	Soil and sediments were contaminated by carcinogenic PAHs from former wood treatment operations.	12/30/1982	09/08/1983	12/31/1991		09/22/1995
FLD980709356	Cabot/Koppers	Alachua	The Cabot part of the site is a former charcoal production operation, which is now redeveloped; the Koppers part is a former wood treatment facility. Groundwater, soil and possibly off-site surface water are contaminated by arsenic, PAHs and creosote compounds, from poor waste-handling practices in the past.	09/08/1983	09/21/1984			
FLD094590916	Callaway & Son Drum Service	Polk	Groundwater is contaminated by DCE, TCE, PCE, xylene and vinyl chloride from former drum cleaning operations at levels not thought to pose a risk. Contaminated drums have been removed from the site.	02/04/2000	05/11/2000	12/21/2007		08/04/2009
FLD981931959	Cascade Park Gasification Plant/Landfill	Leon	Soil and groundwater contamination by light and heavy oils, coal tars, sludges, ash, ammonia, cyanide and lime wastes					
FL5170022474	Cecil Field Naval Air Station	Duval	Release of petroleum products, solvents, corrosives, compressed gasses, pesticides, paints and thinners from spills and poor housekeeping practices at the former base.	07/14/1989	11/21/1989	08/26/2009	05/21/2003	
FLD080174402	Chemform, Inc.	Broward	Soil and groundwater were contaminated by vinyl chloride, arsenic, chromium and other substances from disposal practices at a former precision machine shop.	06/10/1988	10/04/1989	09/16/1993		07/28/2000
FLD004064242	Chevron Chemical Co. (Ortho Division)	Orange	Soil and groundwater contamination by pesticides, petroleum products and VOCs, including xylene from waste disposal practices at a former pesticide formulation plant. Contaminated soil has been removed.	01/18/1994	05/31/1994	02/10/1998		
FLD055945653	City Industries, Inc.	Orange	Soil and groundwater contamination by poor waste handling processes and intentional dumping by a former industrial waste handling business. The site was abandoned with around 1,200 drums of hazardous waste and thousands of gallons of sludge in storage tanks. Wastes and contaminated soil were removed in 1983-1984; groundwater is being treated.	10/15/1984	10/04/1989	03/02/1994		
FLD991279894	Coleman-Evans Wood Preserving Co.	Duval	Soil, sediment and shallow groundwater were contaminated by PCP and dioxins from former wood treatment operations. Over 210,000 short tons (190,000 t) of soil have been treated, around 320,000 gallons of hazardous liquids have been recovered and safely disposed of, over 2,000 cubic yards of hazardous solids have been safely disposed of and over 73,000,000 gallons of groundwater have been treated and discharged.	12/30/1982	09/08/1983	09/18/2007		
FLD001704741	Coronet Industries	Hillsborough	Organic and inorganic contamination from former phosphate mine and processing plant is under investigation.					
FLD980602288	Davie Landfill	Broward	Soils, sludges and groundwater contaminated by inorganic compounds, heavy metals and VOCs. The primary contaminants of concern for groundwater are vinyl chloride and antimony. Sludges have been dewatered and stabilized and groundwater contamination has attenuated to levels not thought to pose a risk to health.	12/30/1982	09/08/1983	11/08/1995		08/21/2006
FLD000833368	Dubose Oil Products Co.	Escambia	Soil was contaminated by VOCs, PAHs and PCP and groundwater by VOCs, from a former waste processing facility. After cleanup, no hazardous substances remain on site at levels considered harmful.	10/15/1984	06/10/1986	09/11/1997		10/01/2004
FLD008168346	Escambia Wood	Escambia	Creosote, PCP, PAH and dioxin contamination from an abandoned wood treatment facility. Adjacent properties are contaminated by PCP and dioxins and groundwater by PCP and naphthalene. Most of an estimated 358 affected households have been permanently relocated.	08/23/1994	12/16/1994			
FLD083111005	Flash Cleaners	Broward	Soil, sludge and groundwater contaminated by PCE, TCE and decomposition products from former on-site dry cleaning operations.	03/19/2008	09/03/2008			
FLD984184127	Florida Petroleum Reprocessors	Broward	Extensive VOC groundwater pollution from a former waste oil processing facility has contaminated the Biscayne Aquifer. Soil is contaminated by VOCs and waste oil degradation products and there is a highly concentrated non-aqueous phase layer.	04/01/1997	03/06/1998			
FLD050432251	Florida Steel Corp.	Martin	Soil was contaminated by lead, zinc from disposal of dust filtered from the air in the mill and by PCBs from hydraulic fluid leaks. Groundwater is contaminated by sodium from a water softening plant and radium, which may be naturally occurring but may have been concentrated by operation of the water softener. The steel mill has not operated since 1982.	12/30/1982	09/08/1983	09/11/1997		
FLR000091322	General Dynamics Longwood	Seminole	Soil is contaminated by TCE and breakdown products, arsenic, cadmium, lead, mercury and silver and groundwater by TCE and breakdown products, and chromium from former printed circuit board manufacture and other operations. The shallow aquifer is connected to the Upper Floridan Aquifer.	04/09/2009				
FLD071307680	Gold Coast Oil Corp.	Miami-Dade	Soil was contaminated by VOCs and metals from improper waste disposal at a former oil and solvent reclamation facility. Groundwater, including the Biscayne Aquifer, which is the sole source of drinking water for southern Florida, was contaminated by VOCs.	12/30/1982	09/08/1983	06/23/1992		10/09/1996
FLD000602334	Harris Corp. (Palm Bay Plant)	Brevard	Groundwater was contaminated by numerous substances, including vinyl chloride, TCE and chromium. The adjacent municipal well field was contaminated.	04/10/1985	07/22/1987	07/01/1998		
FLD053502696	Helena Chemical Co. (Tampa Plant)	Hillsborough	Soil is contaminated by pesticides, semi-VOCs and VOCs, including xylene, from former operations on site. Groundwater is contaminated by chlorinated pesticides, PAHs, phenols and VOCs.	02/07/1992	10/14/1992			
FLD980709802	Hipps Road Landfill	Duval	A former landfill site was redeveloped into residential lots. Groundwater is contaminated by VOCs, including vinyl chloride and benzene.	09/08/1983	09/21/1984	09/02/1994		
FLD004119681	Hollingsworth Solderless Terminal	Broward	Soil and groundwater contamination by VOCs from the discharge of degreasing agents.	12/30/1982	09/08/1983	06/04/1993		
FL7570024037	Homestead Air Force Base	Miami-Dade	Groundwater contamination typical of air operations (such as jet fuel and metals) is of concern as it drains into Biscayne National Park.	07/14/1989	08/30/1990	09/29/2006		
FLD043047653	ITT Thompson Industries	Madison	Groundwater contamination by TCE, DCE and vinyl chloride and sediment contamination by lead, zinc and chromium from former auto parts manufacturing.					
FLSFN0407002	Jacksonville Ash	Duval	Ash disposal from three former waste incinerators led to elevated levels of lead in soil and groundwater, and elevated levels of arsenic, metals, pesticides, PCB and dioxins in soil, surface water, groundwater and sediments.					
FL6170024412	Jacksonville Naval Air Station	Duval	Groundwater, sediment, soil and surface water contaminated by PCBs, VOCs (including methylene chloride, methylethyl ketone, ethyl acetate and TCE), PAHs, sludges containing organic and inorganic compounds, waste solvents, battery acid, JP-5 jet fuel, chlorinated solvents and pesticides.	07/14/1989	11/21/1989			
FLN000410232	JJ Seifert Machine	Hillsborough	Soil contamination by PCE and groundwater contamination by VOCs including PCE, TCE, DCE and vinyl chloride. Private drinking wells have been contaminated.	09/23/2009	03/04/2010			
FLD980727820	Kassauf-Kimerling Battery Disposal	Hillsborough	On-site soil and groundwater, along with sediment and surface water in nearby marshland was contaminated by arsenic, lead and cadmium.	12/30/1982	09/08/1983	09/24/1998		10/02/2000
FLD039049101	Kerr-McGee Chemical Corp Jacksonville	Duval	Soil, groundwater and sediments are contaminated by VOCs, pesticides, PCBs and metals from former pesticide and fertilizer formulation, packaging and distribution facility.	09/23/2009	03/04/2010			
FLD042110841	Landia Chemical Company	Polk	Soil, groundwater and sediment contamination by pesticides, metals, VOCs and semi-VOCs from former pesticide and fertilizer formulation and blending operations.	02/04/2000	05/11/2000			
FLD981019235	Madison County Sanitary Landfill	Madison	Elevated levels of dichloroethane, DCE, TCE and vinyl chloride in soil and groundwater, including the Floridan Aquifer.	04/28/1993	08/30/1990			
FLD076027820	Miami Drum Services	Miami-Dade	Soil was contaminated by metals, pesticides and organic solvents, and groundwater by VOCs from poor waste handling practices at a drum recycling facility, which was forced to close in 1981. Groundwater contamination is mixed with contamination from the nearby Northwest 58th Street Landfill and Varsol Oil Spill Superfund sites and has reached the Biscayne Aquifer, the county's sole source of drinking water.	12/30/1982	09/08/1983	04/28/1993		
FLD088787585	MRI Corp (Tampa)	Hillsborough	Soil, sediment and groundwater are contaminated by lead and other metals, from a former detinning and steel recycling facility, which also operated an electroplating shop.	06/17/1996	12/23/1996			
FLD084535442	Munisport Landfill	Miami-Dade	Groundwater was contaminated by base neutral acids, inorganic compounds, heavy metals, PAHs, pesticides and VOCs from filling of wetland areas with construction debris and solid waste to raise elevation for development.	12/30/1982	09/08/1983	09/05/1997		02/21/1989
FL9170024567	Naval Air Station Pensacola	Escambia	Groundwater is contaminated by VOCs and surface water and sediments are contaminated by heavy metals.	07/14/1989	11/21/1989			
FLD980709398	Nocatee-Hull Creosote	DeSoto	Soil, groundwater and sediment contamination by creosote-related PAHs, benzene, toluene, ethylbenzene and xylenes from railroad tie treatment operations that are believed to have ended in 1952.					
FLD984229773	Normandy Park Apartments	Hillsborough	Soil and groundwater contamination by lead and antimony from former battery recycling operations. Contaminated soil has been removed and groundwater treatment is ongoing.	02/13/1995				
FLD980602643	Northwest 58th Street Landfill	Miami-Dade	Groundwater was contaminated by arsenic, chromium, zinc, benzene, chlorobenzene, tetrachloroethane, TCE and vinyl chloride from former landfill operations. Groundwater contamination is mixed with contamination from the nearby Miami Drum Services and Varsol Oil Spill Superfund sites and has reached the Biscayne Aquifer, the county's sole source of drinking water.	12/30/1982	09/08/1983	03/06/1995		10/11/1996
FLD984169235	Orlando Former Gasification Plant	Orange	Soil and groundwater are contaminated by coal tar waste products.					
FLD041140344	Parramore Surplus	Gadsden	Soil and groundwater were contaminated by PCBs, solvents and cyanide leaking from drums stored on site.	08/30/1982	09/08/1983	09/15/1987		02/21/1989
FLD004091807	Peak Oil Co./Bay Drum Co.	Hillsborough	The site is a former waste oil re-refining plant and drum reconditioning facility. Soil, sludges, surface water and sediments are contaminated by PCBs, VOCs, arsenic, lead and other heavy metals from process wastes and groundwater is contaminated by VOCs and heavy metals.	10/15/1984	06/10/1986	09/26/2006		
FLD032544587	Pepper Steel & Alloys, Inc.	Miami-Dade	Soil is contaminated by PCBs, lead and arsenic.	09/08/1983	09/21/1984	09/28/1993		
FLD980798698	Petroleum Products Corp.	Broward	Soil and groundwater are contaminated by chlorinated solvents, transformer oil and heavy metals including lead, aluminum, chromium, iron and manganese from former waste oil re-refining. Specific sources of contamination include former waste disposal practices and catastrophic spills. An estimated 30,000 to 125,000 gallons of contaminated waste oil is floating on top of the Biscayne Aquifer, the sole source of drinking water for the county.	04/10/1985	07/22/1987			
FLD980556351	Pickettville Road Landfill	Duval	Metal and VOC contamination of soil and groundwater from the closed hazardous waste landfill threaten local drinking water supplies and creeks.	12/30/1982	09/08/1983	09/24/2008		
FLD056116965	Pioneer Sand Co.	Escambia	The site is a former sand quarry that was later used as a landfill. Soil and sludges are contaminated by PCBs.	12/30/1982	09/08/1983	12/31/1991		02/08/1993
FLD004054284	Piper Aircraft/Vero Beach Water & Sewer	Indian River	Soil and groundwater were contaminated by a leak from an underground TCE storage tank.	06/10/1986	02/21/1990	09/18/1997		
FLD984227249	Raleigh Street Dump	Hillsborough	Soil and sediments are contaminated by the disposal of battery casings, furnace slag and other materials. Groundwater is contaminated by antimony, arsenic and lead. The groundwater has high natural salinity so is not potable but contamination may extend to local wetlands.	09/03/2008	04/09/2009	08/12/2014		
FLD000824896	Reeves Southeast Galvanizing Corp	Hillsborough	Groundwater, sediments and soil are contaminated by heavy metals, including zinc, chromium and lead.	12/30/1982	09/08/1983			
FLD101835528	St. Augustine Gas	Volusia	Groundwater, soil and sediments are contaminated by VOCs, metals, inorganic compounds and PAHs from former coal gasification plant. Soil is also contaminated by dioxins, which are not associated with these operations.					
FLD032728032	Sanford Dry Cleaners	Seminole	Soil and groundwater are contaminated by PCE and its decomposition products TCE and DCE from a dry cleaning business that closed in 2001.	03/04/2010				
FLD984169193	Sanford Gasification Plant	Seminole	The site is contaminated by metals, VOCs, PAHs, dioxins and dibenzofurans.					
FLD980602882	Sapp Battery Salvage	Jackson	Soil, sediments, surface water and groundwater are contaminated by sulfuric acid, lead and other heavy metals, and plasticizers.	12/30/1982	09/08/1983			
FLD062794003	Schuylkill Metals Corp.	Hillsborough	The site is a former battery recycling facility. Soil, surface water and sediments in nearby wetlands contained highly elevated levels of lead and groundwater is contaminated by lead, chromium and sulfate beyond state drinking water standards.	12/30/1982	09/08/1983	09/18/1997		08/22/2001
FLD043861392	Sherwood Medical Industries	Volusia	Groundwater is contaminated by VOCs and soil by heavy metals from former waste disposal practices.	12/30/1982	09/08/1983	09/18/1997		
FLD980728877	62nd Street Dump	Hillsborough	Improper disposal of an estimated 48,000 cubic yards of waste on-side has contaminated soil and groundwater with antimony, arsenic, cadmium, chromium, copper, lead and PCBs.	12/30/1982	09/08/1983	09/29/1995		10/01/1999
FLD032845778	Solitron Devices	Palm Beach	Soil and groundwater, including municipal supply wells, are contaminated by heavy metals and solvents from a former electronics manufacturing facility.					
FLD045459526	Solitron Microwave	Martin	Groundwater contamination by PCE, TCE, DCE and vinyl chloride from a former plating and manufacturing business had affected private drinking water wells.	03/06/1998	07/28/1998	10/04/1994		
FL0001209840	Southern Solvents, Inc.	Hillsborough	Soil and groundwater, including the Floridan Aquifer, are contaminated by PCE, believed to be from spills at the former dry-cleaning solvent distribution facility.	05/11/2000	07/27/2000			
FLD004072658	Sprague Electric	Seminole	Groundwater, including the Floridan Aquifer is contaminated by TCE and TCA from a former capacitor manufacturing plant.					
FLD004126520	Standard Auto Bumper Corp.	Miami-Dade	Soil and groundwater are contaminated by nickel and chromium from poor waste disposal practices at a former electroplating facility. Contamination threatens the Biscayne Aquifer, the county's sole source of drinking water.	06/24/1988	10/04/1989	10/04/1994		10/26/2007
FLD004092532	Stauffer Chemical Co (Tampa)	Hillsborough	Soil, surface water, sediments and groundwater are contaminated by pesticides from an inactive pesticide manufacturing and distribution facility.	06/17/1996	12/23/1996	09/26/2000		
FLD010596013	Stauffer Chemical Co. (Tarpon Springs)	Pinellas	Soil, groundwater and surface water are contaminated by arsenic, antimony, beryllium, phosphorus, PAHs and radium-226 from a former phosphorus refining plant.	02/07/1992	05/31/1994			
FLD000648055	Sydney Mine Sludge Ponds	Hillsborough	Improper disposal of around 16 million gallons of liquid waste and sludges have contaminated groundwater with PAHs and VOCs. The Hawthorn Aquifer, the main local supply of drinking water, is contaminated.	06/10/1986	10/04/1989	06/28/1999		
FLD980494959	Taylor Road Landfill	Hillsborough	The Floridan Aquifer is contaminated by VOCs and metals, which have been detected in private wells.	12/30/1982	09/08/1983	06/18/1999		
FLD004065546	Tower Chemical Co.	Lake	Soil and groundwater are contaminated by DDT, chlorobenzilate and their partial breakdown compounds from an abandoned pesticide manufacturing facility. Chemicals spilled into Lake Apopka.	12/30/1982	09/08/1983			
FLD091471904	Trans Circuits, Inc.	Palm Beach			02/04/2000			
FLD070864541	Tri-City Oil Conservationist, Inc.	Hillsborough				09/21/1987		09/01/1988
FLD091471904	Tyndall Air Force Base	Bay		06/17/1996	04/01/1997			
FLD098924038	United Metals, Inc.	Jackson			04/30/2003			
FLD980602346	Varsol Oil Spill	Miami-Dade	Surface water and groundwater were contaminated by PAHs from oil spills at Miami International Airport, including a leak of approximately 1.6 million gallons of varsol, a petroleum solvent from an underground pipe. Groundwater contamination is mixed with contamination from the nearby Miami Drum Services and Northwest 58th Street Landfill Superfund sites and has reached the Biscayne Aquifer, the county's sole source of drinking water.	12/30/1982	09/08/1983	03/29/1985		09/01/1988
FLD982119729	West Florida Natural Gas	Marion						
FLD980602767	Whitehouse Oil Pits	Duval			09/08/1983	05/04/2006		
FL2170023244	Whiting Field Naval Air Station	Santa Rosa		01/18/1994	05/31/1994			
FLD041184383	Wilson Concepts of Florida, Inc.	Broward				09/22/1992		04/04/1995
FLD981021470	Wingate Road Municipal Incinerator Dump	Broward			10/04/1989	01/04/2002		
FLD004146346	Woodbury Chemical Co. (Princeton Plant)	Miami-Dade				06/25/1992		11/27/1995
FLD980844179	Yellow Water Road Dump	Duval				10/03/1996		05/18/1999
FLD049985302	Zellwood Ground Water Contamination	Orange			09/08/1983	09/16/2003		

== See also ==
- Environmental issues in Florida
- List of Superfund sites in the United States
- List of environmental issues
- List of waste types
- TOXMAP
