= List of reporting marks: R =

Note: Marks ending in U are for container owners; marks ending in X are not common carriers; marks ending in Z are for trailers without flanged wheels. All other marks are of common-carrier railroads.

== R ==
- RABU - Rabanco Companies
- RACN - Raccoon River Railroad
- RACU - Acciona Logistica
- RACX - General Electric Rail Services Corporation
- RACX - Union Tank Car Company (child mark of UTCX)
- RAEU - Reach America Esg Ltd
- RAFU - Oxitec S R L
- RAFX - Rose Acre Farms Inc
- RAGU - Rabanco Companies (child mark of RABU)
- RAHU - IGL Limited
- RAIL - Railinc Corporation (Switch Terminal Carrier)
- RAIU - Rainbow Containers Gmbh
- RAIX - Union Carbide Corporation (Subsidiary of Dow Chemical Company USA, child mark of UCFX)
- RAJX - Rail Logix Alamo Junction, LLC (Elmendorf, Texas)
- RALU - Royal Arctic Line A/S
- RALX - Radnor Rail Ltd
- RAMX - RailAmerica
- RAMX - Rail Merchants International
- RANU - Rabanco Companies (child mark of RABU)
- RAPX - Rapco Transportation Company
- RARW - Rarus Railway Company (Class 3 Railroad)
- RASU - Raseef Containers Services LLC
- RASX - C A Rasmussen
- RATU - Royal Atlantic LLC
- RATX - Railtex Service Co Inc
- RAVU - Flex Box Limited
- RAWX - Platte River Power Authority
- RAX - RPI-AAR Cooperative Test Program
- RAX - Railroad Passenger Car Numbering Bureau (Shop Mark)
- RBBN - Burlington Northern Railway
- RBBQ - Burlington Northern Railway
- RBBU - Besed
- RBBX - Ringling Brothers and Barnum and Bailey Circus
- RBCS - Burlington Northern Railway
- RBMN - Reading Blue Mountain and Northern Railroad; Reading and Northern
- RBNX - Fruit Growers Express
- RBOX - Railbox Company; TTX Corporation
- RBW - Burlington Northern Railway
- RC - Rosslyn Connecting Railroad
- RCCX - Relco Nevada Corporation (Relco Tank Line Division)
- RCOX - Arco Products Company
- RCRX - Reagent Chemical and Research, Inc.
- RCSX - Red-Corn Scrap Metals, Inc.
- RDG - Reading Railroad; Norfolk Southern
- RDTX - R.E.D. Technologies, LLC
- RE - Relco
- RECX - Central Louisiana Electric Company
- REDX - Saudi Research and Development Corporation, Ltd. (REDEC)
- REDZ - REDON Incorporated
- REGX - Regus Industries LLC
- RELX - Relco Nevada Corporation (Relco Tank Line Division)
- RESX - Rescar, Inc.
- RFCX - R&F Coal Company
- RFMX - Robert F. Miller; Caldwell-Baker
- RFP - Richmond, Fredericksburg and Potomac Railroad; CSX Transportation
- RGCX - Rio Grande Chemical Sales Company
- RGIX - Republic Gas and Utilities Corporation
- RGS - Rio Grande Southern Railroad
- RGW - Rio Grande Western Railway
- RHAX - Sulphur Sales, Inc.
- RHBX - R. H. Bogle Company
- RHRX - Rahr Malting Company
- RI - Chicago, Rock Island and Pacific Railroad Chicago Rock Island & Pacific Railroad LLC (Rock Island Rail)
- RIIX - Reilly Industries, Inc.
- RILX - Chicago, Rock Island & Pacific Railroad LLC/Rock Island Lines
- RJCC - R.J. Corman Railroad/Central Kentucky Lines
- RJCP - R.J. Corman Railroad/Pennsylvania Lines
- RJCW - R.J. Corman Railroad/Western Ohio Line
- RJNX - R. H. Bogle Company
- RKCX - Knox Kershaw, Inc.
- RKGX - River King Coal Company
- RKMW - Chicago, Rock Island and Pacific Railroad (Rock Island) Milwaukee Road directed operations
- RLAX - Rail Logix, LLC (Ameriport/Baytown, Texas)
- RLGN - Mackenzie Northern Railway
- RLCX - RELCO
- RLGX - Rail Logix, LP (Port Crossing/La Porte, Texas)
- RLIX - Rail Link Inc.
- RLK - Rail Link
- RLKX - R. L. and S. S. Klein
- RLSX - Robert L. Shipp
- RMCX - Reynolds Metals Company
- RMDX - American Refrigerator Transit Company
- RMPX - Progress Rail Services Corporation; Railcar Ltd.
- RMRX - Rocky Mountaineer
- RNDX - ACF Industries
- RNRH - Roanoke chapter NRHS
- ROCK - Chicago, Rock Island and Pacific Railroad, Chicago Rock Island & Pacific Railroad LLC (Rock Island Rail)
- ROCX - Rock Island Improvement Company (Rock Island); Rocky Mountain Transportation Services
- ROIX - Shintech, Inc.
- ROYX - TCL, Inc.
- RPCX - Railroad Passenger Car Numbering Bureau
- RPDX - Rapido Trains Inc.
- RPRC - Richmond Pacific Railroad
- RPRX - Railpower Hybrid Technologies Corp
- RR - Conrail
- RRC - Respondek Railroad Corporation
- RREX - Rex Railway
- RRLX - Railroad Resources, Inc. (maintenance of way cars)
- RRLX - Rail Logistics Inc. / Rail Logistics LC
- RRMX - Robertson's Ready Mix / RRM Properties Ltd, A California Limited Partnership
- RRPX - Railroad Power Leasing
- RRRR - Rock & Rail Inc.
- RRRX - Rex Leasing, Inc.
- RS - Roberval and Saguenay Railway
- RSB - Rochester Subway
- RSLX - RSL Corporation
- RSOR - Riceboro Southern Railway
- RSP - Roscoe, Snyder and Pacific Railway
- RSPX - Evans Railcar Leasing
- RSR - Rochester and Southern Railroad
- RSS - Rochester Subway; Rockdale, Sandow and Southern Railroad
- RSSX - RAILSERV Management Corporation
- RSTX - RSTX, Inc.
- RSUX - Riley Stoker Corporation
- RSVX - RAILSERV Management Corporation
- RSYX - Refined Sugars, Inc.
- RT - River Terminals Railway
- RTCX - Union Tank Car Company
- RTDX - Regional Transportation District; RTD Bus & Light Rail
- RTEX - Rail Trusts Equipment
- RTLX - Relco Nevada Corporation (Relco Tank Line Division)
- RTM - Réseau de transport métropolitain
- RTMX - Richmond Leasing Company
- RTPX - Wheelabrator Coal Services Company
- RTTX - TTX Corporation
- RUDX - Ruddy Tank Car Company
- RUSX - US Rail Services, Inc.
- RUT - Rutland Railroad; Vermont Railway
- RV - Rahway Valley Railroad; Morristown & Erie
- RVCX - Richter Vinegar Corporation
- RVLX - Reinhardt Vinegar
