= Stockpile (disambiguation) =

A stockpile is a temporary storage method used in bulk material handling.

Stockpile may also refer to:

- Stockpile (military), a staging tactic involving the grouping of resources
- Soil stockpile, a method of storing topsoil during civil construction
- Panic buying, of consumer goods

== See also ==
- Strategic National Stockpile
