= Railgon Company =

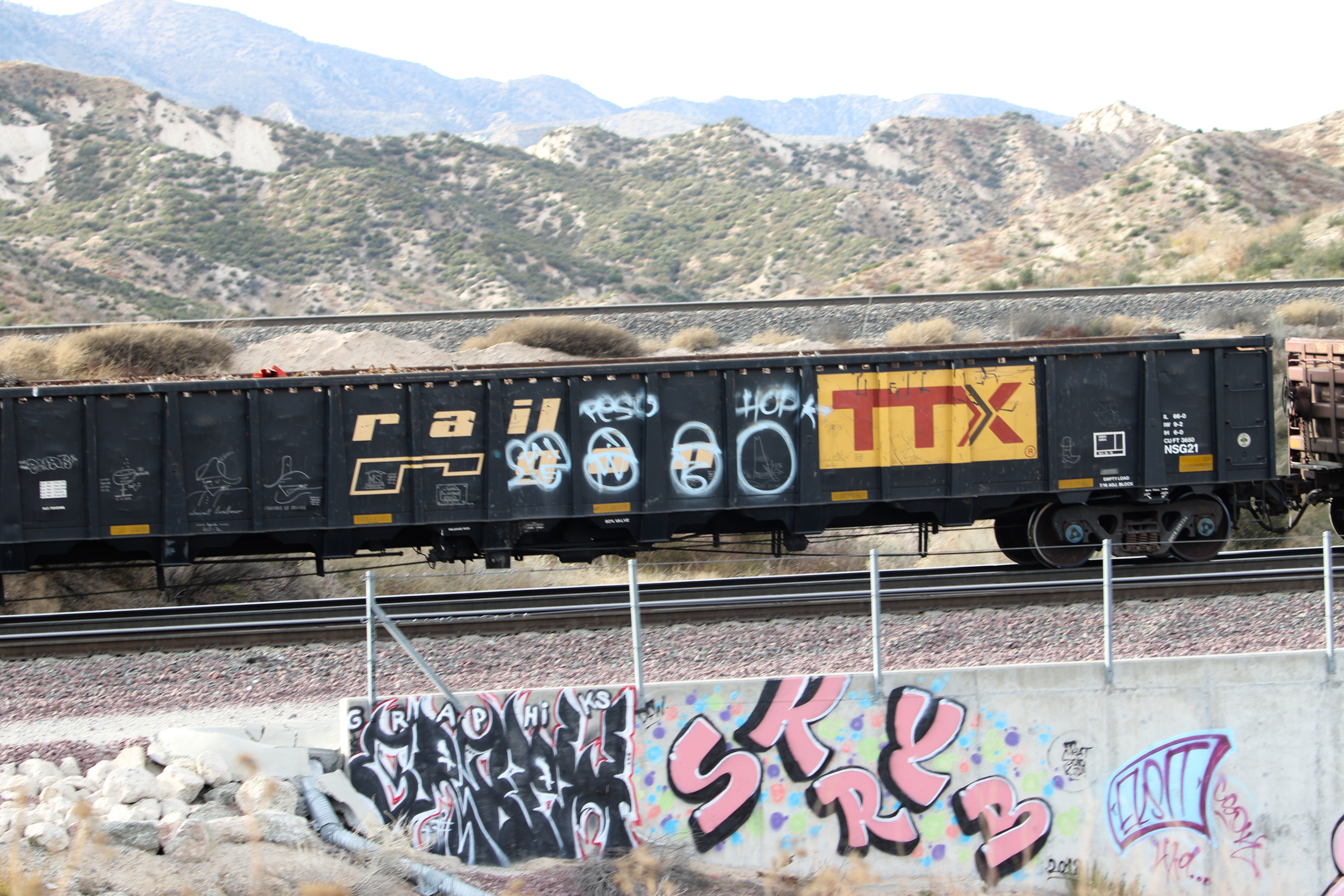
A Railgon gondola

The Railgon Company, (reporting marks GONX, GNTX) established in 1979, is an American company that owns railroad gondola cars available for use by multiple railroads by placing the cars in a cooperative pool.

Shipments in gondola cars and other rolling stock are often used to transport goods on more than one railroad before reaching the receiver. Under the regulations governing railway transport, individual railroads paid fees, called car hire, for the time and mileage to utilize other railroads’ railcars (whether loaded or empty) Car hire was designed to promote the rapid return of rolling stock, since delays equated to extra money spent.

Because of the desire to reduce costs by minimizing car hire, non-owning railroads may have declined the practice of allowing cars to continue on past their initial destination to points further from the car's "home". This had the effect of decreasing efficiency on these lines, and Railgon (and Railbox) used this argument to promote use of their rolling stock.

Railroad deregulation as part of the Staggers Act reduced the need for this service, and the use of this cooperative arrangement consequently declined. As a result, today the Railgon pool is significantly smaller than at its peak.

Railgon (and the similar Railbox Company) are currently subsidiaries of TTX Company, formerly the Trailer Train Company, which is owned by multiple railroads and leases cars to them. There are currently 1188 cars in the Railgon fleet, compared with over 13,000 boxcars in the Railbox fleet.
