= Escambia Wood =

Escambia Wood Treating Company Site
- Superfund site
- Location within Florida
- Location: Pensacola, Escambia County, Florida; 30°27′19″N 87°13′54″W

Information
- CERCLIS ID: FLD008168346
- Contaminants: Creosote, pentachlorophenol (PCP), polyaromatic hydrocarbons (PAHs), and dioxin

Progress
- Proposed: August 23, 1994
- Listed: December 16, 1994

The Escambia Wood Treating Company (ETC) site is located at 3910 Palafox Highway, northeast of the intersection of Fairfield Drive in Pensacola, Florida, and is in a mixed industrial, commercial, and residential area. The site includes the 26-acre property of the former wood preserving facility and over 60 acres of nearby neighborhoods. The facility was in operation from 1942 until 1982, then abandoned by the owner in 1991. During its operation, ETC treated utility poles, foundation pilings, and lumber with creosote and pentachlorophenol. Production byproducts were dumped into on-site, unlined containment pits where they seeped into the surrounding soil and groundwater.

The site sits above the aquifer which supplies drinking water to the county's residents and also flows into Bayou Texar and Escambia Bay. Contaminants from ETC have affected surface soils at the facility and surrounding areas, and have leached into the groundwater, causing a plume that extends approximately 1.3 miles from the site. A second Superfund site, the Agrico Co. site, is located near ETC, causing additional soil and groundwater contamination.

The United States Environmental Protection Agency (EPA) is the lead agency for the ETC site cleanup, and site remediation is being conducted and financed through Superfund with the Florida Department of Environmental Protection (FDEP). In 1992 the EPA excavated around 255,000 cubic yards of soil on the ETC property, which was mounded onsite and covered with a tarp. This mound of contaminated soil became known to the local community as “Mount Dioxin.” ETC was added to the EPA's Superfund National Priorities List in 1994. Site clean up, including the removal of Mount Dioxin, did not begin until 2005, and is currently on-going.

In 1997 the EPA's National Relocation Pilot Project began the relocation of 358 households affected by contaminants from ETC. In 2006, an additional 46 households were identified as being directly impacted by contamination, and the relocation of these families was completed in 2009. The removal of these residential areas was the third largest Superfund relocation initiated by the EPA, after Love Canal in Niagara Falls, New York and Times Beach, Missouri.

The neighborhoods surrounding the ETC were composed primarily of low-income African Americans in single family houses and federally subsidized apartment buildings. Residents were concerned by contaminants from the ETC, including creosote-related compounds, pentachlorophenol, and dioxins, which occurred as an impurity in pentachlorophenol. The affected residents formed a grassroots environmental justice community, Citizens Against Toxic Exposure (CATE), to bring their concerns to the involved government agencies. CATE has been extremely effective at forcefully dealing with the government, obtaining congressional support, news media attention, and the assistance of national organizations.

== Background ==
The Escambia Wood Treating Company is located at 3910 Palafox Highway, northeast of the intersection of Fairfield Drive in Pensacola, Florida. The 26-acre site is situated in an area of mixed land use, bordered by a small residential community to the north, the CSX railway to the east, Palafox Drive to the west, and by numerous businesses in an area of mixed residential and industrial zoning to the south. ETC operated from 1942 until 1982 as a manufacturer of treated wooden utility poles and foundation pilings. The Escambia Wood Treating Company filed for bankruptcy and abandoned the site in 1991.

Before the start of operations in 1942, the land was used for farming. From 1942 until 1963, ETC used creosote in the wood treating process. ETC's Pensacola facility was involved in the pressure-treating of wood products, primarily utility poles and foundation pilings. Southern Yellow Pine was debarked, formed, dried, impregnated with preservatives, and stored at the facility until delivered to customers. From 1944 to approximately 1970, coal-tar creosote was used as the primary wood preservative. The use of creosote was later replaced by pentachlorophenol (PCP).

=== Wood treatment process ===
In 1963, pentachlorophenol (PCP) was introduced to the process and was used exclusively from 1970 until the facility was closed in 1982. PCP dissolved in No. 6 diesel fuel was used at the facility as a preservative from 1963, and was the sole preservative in use from 1970 to 1982. Creosote is a mixture of more than 200 organic compounds that are distilled from coal tar at temperatures between 200/C and 400/C. PCP is prepared by the chlorination of phenol in the presence of a catalyst, and is commonly acquired in bulk crystalline form and dissolved in hot diesel fuel because PCP is a solid at ambient temperatures. Before pressure impregnation of preservative into the debarked and "framed," or formed, wood products, naturally occurring moisture and resin were removed from the Southern Yellow Pine using a steam/vacuum process. In this process, the wood was placed in treater cylinders and heated using steam from the facility's wood-fired boiler. Condensate formed in the cylinders during the heating cycle was continuously drained to a condenser hot well, then to a primary oil/water separator via a process drain system. At the end of the heating cycle, the cylinders were vented, and a vacuum was applied. Liquids in the wood, which were either vaporized and removed by the vacuum system or removed from the wood by internally generated steam, settled to the bottom of the cylinders. These liquids then were pumped to the primary oil/water separator at the conclusion of the vacuum cycle. The vacuum system at ETC was a steam ejector jet attached to an elevated, direct-contact, barometric condenser. Vapors from the treater cylinders were condensed, mixed with the condenser cooling water, and were gravity-fed from the condenser 35 feet in the air to the condenser hot well, and then to the oil/water separator. Following the heating/vacuum cycle, the wood preservative was impregnated into the wood under pressure. After the impregnation cycle, the pressure was reduced in the treating cylinders, and the wood products were removed from the cylinders on trams used to transport the wood stock.

=== Waste Management ===
Following pressure reduction, excess wood preservative was allowed to drain from the treated products along drip tracks before on-site storage in the nine treated-wood-storage areas. ETC took few environmental precautions, discharging spent creosote and PCP-laden waste into unlined holding ponds on site and into unlabeled drums. The treatment cylinders (pressure cookers used to saturate the wood with pentachlorophenol and other chemicals) would sometimes fly open, releasing hundreds of gallons of the toxic solution; workers were sent to pump out creosote and pentachlorophenol which had pooled in yards north of the plant after heavy rains flooded the waste ponds and to distribute sand over the contaminated areas. Contaminated wastewater and runoff from the former treatment area were the primary wastes managed at the facility.

In the early years of operation, all wastewater was sent to an unlined impoundment located in the northeastern part of the site. This natural earthen unit was used from the mid-1940s through the mid-1950s. After the mid-1950s, process wastewater and contaminated runoff were managed by two separate systems. Process wastewater was initially managed by an oil/water separator to recover treating chemicals and process water for reuse in the wood-treating process. The system consisted of two concrete and treated wood impoundments. The former "hot" and "cold" ponds, each used from 1955 to 1982, and with a holding area of 6250 cubic feet, operated in series. The "hot" pond received wastewater laden with PCP and creosote before its discharge via shower heads into the "cold" pond. The shower heads cooled the water, volatilizing some of the organic constituents. Water from this unit was discharged to the Pensacola sanitary sewer system or pumped back into the process vacuum line. The contaminated runoff from the treatment area was directed into a runoff collection/separation system. This system consisted of a concrete collection pad and a series of separation basins, which removed waste-treating solutions from the runoff water. Runoff was then pumped via a storm-drain system to an impoundment located in the southern section of the facility. The impoundment, which was constructed of sectionally poured concrete, had a holding capacity of 225,000 gallons. Wastewater in the impoundment, also known as the "swimming pool", was allowed to evaporate, and the remaining content was discharged to the Pensacola sanitary sewer system

=== Contaminants ===
Creosote, pentachlorophenol (PCP), polyaromatic hydrocarbons (PAHs), and dioxin are the main contaminants found on the site. Properties adjacent to the site include residential lands where PAH and dioxin contamination attributable to the site has been identified. Primary contaminants in the ground water are PCP and naphthalene. Dangerous levels of other toxic wastes at ETC include arsenic, benzo(a)pyrene, dieldrin, naphthalene, toluene, xylene, benzene, copper, chromium, asbestos, PCBs, and more.

=== Demographics of affected neighborhoods ===
According to the 1990 census, the population of Pensacola was 58,165, and the population of Escambia County was listed as 262,798. The nearest homes are directly adjacent to Escambia Wood on the northwest boundary of the site, with some homes located within 15 feet of the excavated area.

Thirty to 70% of the people within a one-mile radius of the site live below the poverty level. In comparison, 0 to 30% of the population in other areas of Escambia County live below the poverty level.

The residential areas nearest the site, Rosewood Terrace, Oak Park, Goulding, and Escambia Arms, consist primarily of African-American communities. Additional demographic data indicate that minorities make up 60 to 100 percent of the total population within a one-mile radius of the site. In comparison, most other areas of Escambia County have minority populations that range from 0 to 10 percent of the total.

Thirty to 70% of the population within a one-mile radius of the site has not completed high school. In comparison, in most other areas of Escambia County, the percentage of the population that has not completed high school ranges from 0 to 30%.

== Cleanup ==
Construction of the remedy for OU-1 (soil) began in September 2007, and the earthwork portion of the project was completed in January 2010. More than 500,000 cubic yards of contaminated soil were buried in a lined containment cell on site. The remaining construction activities include establishing vegetation, replacing a sewer line, and treating water draining from the containment cell. Approximately 10.2% of the total cost of the cleanup was funded by the American Recovery and Reinvestment Act (ARRA). A total of $3.5 million of ARRA funds was provided to the project and was used to pay EPA's contractor and local subcontractors, and to provide supplies for construction. EPA's contractor has reported that 79.25 jobs were created with the ARRA funds.

During the spring and summer of 1991, the EPA conducted a site investigation. Based on the site investigation, the EPA implemented emergency response measures and began the excavation of contaminated soils in October 1991. Analysis of excavated soils indicated that excavation should proceed to the water table at a depth of 48 feet below the land surface. Groundwater analysis revealed extensive contamination with PAHs and PCP. The excavation was completed in September 1992, after approximately 250,000 cubic yards of creosote, PCP and dioxin contaminated sludge and soils were excavated and placed in an on-site, lined vault. An estimated 50,000 cubic yards of contaminated soils still lies beneath the vault and in adjacent areas. The EPA has selected Camp, Dresser & McKee Federal (CDM Federal) as the remedial cleanup contractor. In February 1995, CDM submitted a Remedial Investigation Work Plan. In June 1995, EPA nominated the ETC site as a National Relocation Evaluation Pilot site. In August 1995, the EPA Environmental Sampling Division (ESD) performed an off-site sampling of the residential areas surrounding the site. The analytical data revealed several contaminants of concern above cleanup goals established for the site. In November 1995, The EPA initiated the Remedial Investigation (RI) for the site. The Phase I RI was completed in October 1996. The Phase I RI Summary Report indicated that surface and subsurface soils contain elevated levels of PAHs at several locations onsite, and that the bulk of groundwater contamination is no longer present on-site (or is not present in the zones currently monitored). The report also recommended that existing data gaps be investigated during a Phase II RI. The EPA released the Proposed Plan for Interim Action at the ETC site in April 1996, which proposed initially relocating 66 households, and evaluating the relocation of the remainder of the neighborhood between the ETC and Agrico Superfund sites. In August 1996, following continued evaluation and considering comments from FDEP and affected residents, the EPA issued an “Addendum to the April 1996 Superfund Proposed Plan Fact Sheet,” which increased the number of residents requiring relocation to 101. In August 1996, a public meeting was held to discuss the EPA proposed relocation plan.

EPA added the site to the National Priorities List in 1994. Prior to listing, EPA actions included stabilizing the site and securing more than 200,000 cubic yards of contaminated soil in 1991 and 1992. From 1997 to 2008, EPA relocated over 400 households as part of the National Relocation Pilot. In 2007, EPA began implementing the final cleanup approach for soil, which involves excavating contaminated soil and placing it in an on-site containment cell. The approach for ground water cleanup is the in-situ treatment of contamination.

Oddly, EPA did not propose the Escambia site for the National Priorities List (NPL) until August 1994, which was inconsistent with all of the information about the site available to EPA years earlier. This fact and various statements made in EPA removal action decision documents in 1991 and 1992 suggested to this author that EPA Region 4 was apprehensive about securing federal dollars for a very expensive remedial cleanup and intentionally delayed NPL listing.

=== Mount Dioxin ===
From 1991 to 1992, EPA excavated 225,000 cubic yards of contaminated material and stored it under a secure cover on-site.

During 1991–93, EPA excavated 255,00 cubic yards (344,250 tons) of poisoned soil, now stockpiled under a plastic cover. This was a temporary measure, not a permanent solution. For the five-year life of the plastic cover, the excavated waste was prevented from leaching into groundwater or being inhaled, but its time was up at the end of 1997.

The removal consisted primarily of a large site excavation of roughly 255,000 cubic yards of contaminated soil that resulted in the creation of a large pit and a large pile that became widely known as Mount Dioxin. It was one of the highest cost removal actions taken in the Superfund program, over $4 million.

Unable to treat such a large volume of contaminated soil (there was a brief effort to incinerate some of it on site), EPA officials decided to cover it with a 60 mil HDPE plastic liner. Residents were first told the plastic cover would last for five years but the EPA subsequently claimed it had a ten-year lifespan. In 1996, the contractor who installed the cover reported to the EPA that it was damaged and had a two-foot hole and a two-foot tear in it along with other smaller holes.13

The covering has now been in place 15 years, long past its expected lifetime, and continues to be subjected to the intense Florida sun, downpours, and windstorms, Dunham points out. Some residents report that small trees had been spotted growing through it. In 1998 repairs were made to the cover but by 2002 the U.S. Army Corps of Engineers study concluded that the tarpaulin was wearing out. 14 There was some concern that a catastrophic failure of the covering might cause dioxin-contaminated soils to be blown over a wide area of the county. The tarp was held during two hurricanes in 2005 with winds from 85 to 110 mph, however, residents report being peppered with some of the soils from the excavation that had never been covered. A further matter of concern is that local kids, who snuck through the fence, discovered that the plastic served as an excellent slide.

== Health effects ==
These contaminants can cause several different kinds of cancers; genetic damage; birth defects; miscarriage; heart disease; liver damage; kidney damage; lung damage; nerve damage; leukemia and other blood diseases; immune system damage; thyroid damage; hormone imbalances; metabolic diseases; severe skin irritation, burning and itching; gangrene; skin cancers; severe eye irritation; permanent scarring of the cornea; severe respiratory irritation; difficult breathing; coughing; chest pain; anemia; blood thinning, bleeding and bruising. Many nearby residents and former workers have suffered and died from these illnesses.

People can be exposed to ETC's toxic wastes by breathing contaminated dust and fumes or by skin contact with contaminated dust, fumes, soil, and bay or bayou sediments; by drinking or swimming in contaminated water; by eating vegetables grown in contaminated soils; by eating contaminated seafood.

Site investigation disclosed elevated levels of creosote, phenols and PAHs, and PCP in soils and groundwater. The presence of polychlorinated biphenyls (PCBs) in isolated soils was detected from several overturned electrical transformers found on site. Analysis of soils also revealed dioxins, a common impurity in commercial PCP. Inhalation of fugitive dust emissions posed a significant threat to nearby workers and residents.

The position of the community was that the removal action created dangerous exposures to mobilized contaminated soil, principally through fugitive soil dust releases, and also through leachate from the pile of excavated materials left behind and covered with plastic sheeting. EPA had justified the removal on the basis of finding very high levels of site contamination, including very high levels of dioxins/furans, and contamination of shallow groundwater. New data on site contamination obtained as part of an early Remedial Investigation activity in 1996 clearly showed that the original removal action had left very high levels of site contamination all over the site, including in the open pits and the areas not covered by the pile of excavated materials. In other words, the removal action did not effectively remove the threat to shallow groundwater, given originally by EPA as the main basis for the action. Moreover, the removal action left highly contaminated surface soils as sources of continued releases into the environment and it did nothing to protect residents. In sum, CATE asserted that EPA's removal action had itself caused preventable health threats.

Burlap bags were also used as protective footwear at the Escambia Treating Company plant. One former worker described climbing in the long troughs filled with creosote and spinning the poles with his feet until the wood was completely saturated in the black tar-like substance that keeps them from rotting. After a batch was finished, the wastewater contaminated with creosote was dumped into an unlined hole in the ground where, over the years, it seeped into the groundwater. Residents in the surrounding homes, who depended on shallow wells, had to pump the water for several minutes to clear the oil substance before getting relatively clean water. Years later, there were wells capped by county officials and city water was piped in. “No one told us at the time that the reason they capped the wells was that the groundwater was contaminated,” Williams notes. “We just thought they were improving the system,” she recalls.

=== Community action ===
Most of the members of CATE are residents or former residents of Rosewood Terrace, Oak Park, Goulding, Escambia Arms and the Clarinda Triangle, and former workers at nearby industries in Pensacola, Florida. Other concerned citizens are eligible for membership and are encouraged to join.

The special focus of the group has been the environmental condition of the residential neighborhoods near two contaminated industrial sites, Escambia Treating Company (woodtreating) and Agrico Chemical Company (agricultural chemicals). Both appear on the National Priorities List for national Superfund cleanup. Dynamic air, stormwater runoff, and groundwater interaction have a clear potential to affect environmental conditions for a much larger community.

In the spring of 1992, homeowners in the vicinity of the two sites began to meet because of widespread health effects caused by an emergency removal of contaminated soil in progress at the former woodtreating plant. Within months it became apparent that the group was facing complex and long-term questions regarding health protection and toxic cleanup. Officers were elected and 501(c)3 status was established. The group name was suggested by the late James O. Toles, a founding member.

CATE was organized in the belief that every person deserves to live free from toxic exposure. CATE works to promote a healthy environment, safe living conditions, and environmental justice.

By educating and informing group members and the Pensacola community, CATE fosters public participation in decisions about protection from and clean- up of toxic chemicals. Since these issues affect the quality of air, soil, drinking water, surface water, and life in the area, CATE is active in outreach to potential members, to other local groups, and to government officials. CATE also maintains relationships with similarly concerned groups across the country.

CATE members refused this opening offer and held out for more households to be moved. Specifically, they pushed for all the inhabitants of Escambia Arms, a low-income public housing project on the fenceline with ETC, and residents in Goulding to be included in the relocation plan. To bring pressure on the EPA to expand the relocation offer, CATE sponsored a meeting to discuss the issue at the New Hope Missionary Baptist Church where some 350 angry residents showed up on a steamy August evening to tell federal officials what was on their mind. Officials were presented with 300 petitions calling for a comprehensive relocation plan. “One by one they filed up to the microphones on either side of the sanctuary to voice their objections.” Rejecting the agency's claim that additional study would be needed to justify relocation of other residents, the crowd held up hand –lettered placards and chanted: “No more studies—move us now!” A number of residents who were eligible to be moved said they would hold out until their neighbors were included. “If we were white it would be a completely different story,” Williams told the crowd.23

Others in high office were sympathetic to this perspective. President William Jefferson Clinton had signed an executive order directing federal agencies to give priority to environmental justice sites where minority residents were disproportionately burdened by pollution. Williams, who had been appointed to the National Environmental Justice Advisory Council (NEJAC), had convinced other members of the group to hold a workshop on relocation in Pensacola.

Also turning up the pressure on the Clinton Administration to relocate residents near the Escambia Treating Company was former Love Canal activist Lois Gibbs of CHEJ who took out a full-page ad in the Florida edition of USA TODAY on October 1, 1996. The ad featured a photo of children playing near Mount Dioxin. The caption next to the photos quoted President Clinton saying, “No child should ever have to live near a hazardous waste site.”

=== Relocation ===
Two days later, on October 3, 1996, the EPA decided to accede to CATE's demand to move all 358 households living in the shadow of Mount Dioxin. This was a historic breakthrough. The Pensacola relocation initiative, which took place between 1997 and 2005, was the first major relocation by the EPA of African-American residents and cost the EPA $25.5 million. 24 The Pensacola relocation initiative was the third largest in EPA history following the Love Canal relocation in Niagara Falls, New York in 1980 and the Times Beach, Missouri relocation where 2,000 residents were moved in 1982. Both of these relocation initiatives involved largely white populations.

The interim remedy began in 1997 and consisted of the relocation of 358 households. The government acquired 158 single family homes, a 200-unit apartment complex, and 11 vacant residential lots, successfully relocating over 500 persons to comparable replacement housing. Demolition of the properties and disposal of associated waste materials was completed in 2005. In 2006, an additional 46 households were identified as being directly impacted by contamination. Permanent relocation of these households began in December 2006 and was completed in 2009.

After a full examination of the impacts to the nearby communities, and considering the adverse impacts to all closely situated residents due to potential remedial options, the EPA issued a statement in October 1996 stating that all 358 households around the ETC the site would be relocated. The actual number of households to be relocated has been revised to 370 as a result of additional information.

The EPA issued its Interim Action Record of Decision (IAROD) for the interim remedial action at the ETC site in February 1997. The IAROD specifies the relocation of all 358 households from the surrounding residential communities. The FDEP issued its Letter of Concurrence with the IAROD in March 1997. The State Superfund Contract (SSC) between the State of Florida and the EPA for the Interim Action was signed on May 6, 1997. The US Army Corps of Engineers (ACOE) opened an office near the site in Pensacola to handle relocation activities. The ACOE appraised residences, and located comparable properties in the Pensacola area. As of January 2002, ACOE has acquired 156 single family homes, and all of the 200 tenant homes at the Escambia Arms apartments. However, 1 household is still awaiting suitable housing.

Although the site has been in the Superfund program for some time, it has only recently advanced to the remedial cleanup stage and is now receiving a Remedial Investigation by an EPA contractor. For years, EPA's focus was on a very large scale removal action. The community received very little information about the removal action prior to its completion in 1992 and, to a large degree, became mobilized because of perceived health threats created by EPA's removal action. Also, in interviews conducted by EPA with local residents in 1992, the racial bias issue had emerged.

In June 1995, the Escambia site was selected as EPA's National Relocation Evaluation Pilot site. The pilot was initiated "to test the extent of the Agency's authority under CERCLA and evaluate the range of EPA's decision making and implementation processes when conducting permanent relocations under Superfund"[citation in article if use]. CATE and other parties believed that the pilot project had been conceived, in large measure, because of the visibility of the demand for relocation at the Escambia site and several other Superfund sites with minority communities, and no other site was nominated by EPA regions for the pilot project. It was broadly understood to offer an opportunity for EPA to more fully invoke the CERCLA statute's authority to base relocation not merely on health threats, but also because of the law's explicit reference to protecting public well-being, as well as cost-effectiveness argument for remedial alternatives. The Pensacola community hoped that EPA would consider broad social, economic impact and environmental justice issues, as well as traditional quantitative risk assessment data in its relocation decision.

In April 1996, EPA Region 4 issued a draft Proposed Plan for an interim remedial action consisting of permanent relocation of 66 households adjacent to the Escambia site, 21 of which were justified on the basis of health threats (because of dioxin contamination). In August 1996, an addendum was issued expanding the relocation to include 101 households. In October 1996, a full page advertisement ran in the Florida edition of USA Today newspaper focused on the plight of the Pensacola residents and was addressed to President Clinton. The ad featured endorsements by many diverse groups. Two days later the Region 4 Administrator announced an expanded relocation to include all 358 households, ending a two-year dispute with CATE. This was weeks before the presidential election, and after the Escambia site had already received considerable attention from both print and broadcast newsmedia. EPA later said that the "decision was based on a number of factors, including the contamination at the site, the potential uses of the site, the effect on the community of a partial relocation, and a number of other factors" [citation in article if use].

This statement was not entirely consistent with the original news release by EPA Region 4 Administrator John H. Hankinson on October 3, 1996, that said the decision to relocate all residents was "based on the best scientific information available about the community's unique environmental, health and safety factors" and "the community's concerns, as well as our goal to protect the neighborhood's health, welfare and well-being". It was generally understood by CATE that EPA staff in both Region 4 and headquarters did not support the decision to relocate the entire community.

Prior to the National Relocation Pilot Project (see Section 2.5.2) interim action, the nearest residences were directly adjacent to the northeastern boundary of the Site. This residential area nearest the Site included Rosewood Terrace, Oak Park, and the Escambia Arms apartment complex. The Palafox Industrial Park is south of the Site, and abuts another relocated neighborhood encompassing Herman Avenue and Pearl Street to the south. A mixed commercial and residential area west of Palafox Street, known as the Clarinda triangle, also has been impacted by the Site, and was not a subject of the interim action. Prior to relocation, the population surrounding the Site was distributed as follows: 0-.25 miles (180); 0.25 -0.5 miles (540); 0.5 -1 mile (8,909); 1.0-2.0 miles (24,094). Three schools with an enrollment of approximately 2700 students are located from 0.5 to 1 mile from the Site. Figure 2 illustrates the neighborhoods around the ETC Sit.

EPA has examined the full range of remedial options available to address the overall impact of Site conditions on the community. The interaction of the following factors, not any single factor makes relocation the correct remedial decision for the ETC site:

1. EPA has identified health risks due to the presence of 2,3,7,8-TCDD (dioxin) and benzo(a)pyrene (BaP) in portions of the Relocation Area.
2. The adverse impacts on the residents of the Relocation Area from fear stemming from uncertainty relative to health impacts, loss of property values, and psychological stress, are difficult to quantify but are very real considerations. These concerns have arisen in part from the visibility of an extremely large stockpile of highly contaminated soil and two excavations of similar magnitude. The excavations and stockpiles are the results of the 1991–92 removal action in the immediate vicinity of the Relocation Area.
3. In addition to the risks posed by contamination in portions of the Relocation Area, final remediation activities on the site are also expected to further adversely affect the Relocation Area through operational issues such as truck traffic, noise, dust, equipment staging, and other impacts.
4. Removing the residents in the Relocation Area will provide greater flexibility for final remedy selection with a significant potential for lowering overall project costs. The cost savings are enhanced by obviating the need to remediate soil in residential areas to residential risk levels.
5. The residential areas in the Relocation Area are discreet, well defined, and located in a commercial area. The existing land use and transportation infrastructure strongly indicate the appropriate use of the property is as industrial property. In addition, the relocation will provide land for industrial purposes that is valuable to the community from an economic development perspective.

The factors listed above, combined with a concern for the overall welfare of the community, justifies relocation of the residents of the Relocation Area in furtherance of the objectives of the National Relocation Pilot Project. The uniqueness of the site and the interaction of the many factors present here does not, in EPA's opinion, create a precedent for relocation at other Superfund sites.

In April 1996 EPA issued a proposed plan for the Escambia Superfund Site and proposed a remedy for the relocation of 66 households in the Rosewood Terrace Subdivision. The proposed remedy was intended to address contamination in the yards of 22 households and the effects of implementing the remedy on the remaining 44 households. In August, EPA announced that it intended to expand the relocation to encompass the Oak Park Subdivision, thus adding an additional 35 households. The expansion was proposed in recognition of the isolating effect the Rosewood Terrace subdivision relocation would have on the single family homes of the Oak Park community and the community's concerns regarding the contamination at the site. This ROD further expands the relocation to add the Escambia Arms Apartment complex and the Goulding subdivision, approximately an additional 257 households for a total of approximately 358. This decision is based on an evaluation of the public comments and the factors listed in Section 9.

== Groundwater Contamination ==
=== Toxic Plume ===
Groundwater contamination and surface water runoff from the ETC site poses a threat to Pensacola Bay located two miles southeast, and to Bayou Texar, an environmentally sensitive wetland area located 1.5 miles to the east.

Fieldwork for Phase 1, which focused on defining the outside extent of the groundwater plume to the east and southeast of the site, was completed in August 2000. The EPA contractor, CDM, submitted a Phase 1 Data Evaluation Report OU-2, which summarized the data from the Phase 1 fieldwork, in December 2000. Included in this data review is CDM's proposal of a Phase II field effort, which details the installation and sampling of additional wells to define the extent of the offsite contaminant plume and a sampling strategy for Bayou Texar. EPA submitted the Phase I Data Evaluation Report in December 2000. FDEP reviewed the document and submitted comments in February 2001. A discussion of the FDEP comments took place in May 2001, with the EPA project manager and CDM. All of the department's comments were adequately addressed, and the document was approved in June 2001. EPA submitted the Draft Sampling and Analysis Plan for Phase II in April 2001. The FDEP provided comments in May 2001. The FDEP provided revised well locations for the wells needed to delineate the plume. The FDEP also requested 2 well pairs to be installed on the east and west banks of Bayou Texar to monitor the plume migration into and across Bayou Texar. The final Sampling and Analysis Plan was approved in June 2001.

EPA has found that the ETC plume of contamination contains elevated levels of dioxin, pentachlorophenol (PCP),naphthalene, dioxin and a number of other organic contaminants. The dioxin findings are particularly troubling because EPA is ignoring dioxin in its Mt. Dioxin groundwater cleanup planning.

The plume usually flows ESE toward upper Bayou Texar. In general, it moves in the same directions as the Agrico plume, but it may not have proceeded as far as that plume. In some areas, groundwater contamination from the two sources is mixed together. Because Agrico contamination has been found due south as well as southeast, the ETC plume would also travel south sometimes. At other times, especially during droughts, the plume may move in other directions, as well.

Many important questions about the ETC plume remain unanswered. It reaches as far as east as the western shore of Bayou Texar, but EPA has not determined where is goes beyond that. ETC contaminants, including dioxin, have been found on the eastern side of the bayou.

Most of all, it is urgent that EPA warn each resident living over the ETC plume against the use of private well water for any human contact, including swimming pools, yard and garden irrigation, car washing, etc.

== Today ==
Technical planning to implement the selected remedy for OU-2 (ground water) is currently underway. Implementation of the OU-1 (soil) cleanup approach is on-going. Once remedy design is complete, construction will commence for the OU-2 (ground water) remedy.

EPA will use the Recovery Act funds allocated to this site to speed up the ongoing cleanup of off-site properties and to more quickly eliminate human exposure pathways to contaminants. The Recovery Act funding will also accelerate ongoing on-site construction, which will lead to the completion of the soil cleanup earlier. The acceleration in construction will make possible the completion of a key phase of work by June 1, 2009, the beginning of hurricane season. Speeding up the cleanup schedule will make the site available for earlier redevelopment; the County and City are planning to create an industrial park, which is projected to support 1,714 jobs, in the area.

EPA has used a total of $3.5 million of Recovery Act funds to support the ongoing construction of the site.s soil cleanup remedy, which started in July 2009. EPA completed the earthwork portion of the project in January 2010. More than 500,000 cubic yards of contaminated soil were buried in a lined containment cell on site. The remaining construction activities to be completed include establishing vegetation, replacing a sewer line and treating water draining from the containment cell. EPA is currently engaged in the technical planning necessary for implementing the selected ground water remedy. Recovery Act funds created/retained 11.25 jobs for the 1st Quarter FY2010 reporting cycle. (Job numbers are recorded from Recovery.gov as of February 6, 2010).

The overall cleanup strategy for the OU-1 final remedy is to treat principal threat wastes through solidification/stabilization and to permanently isolate surface and subsurface soil contaminated above the selected cleanup levels in an on-site containment system in order to protect both human and ecological receptors. The selected remedy addresses the source materials constituting principal threats at the site. The major components for the Selected Remedy include: • Excavation of contaminated soil both on- and off-site, including permanent relocation of residents in the Clarinda triangle neighborhood; • Containment of the contaminated soil in lined cell(s) followed by the installation of a multi-layer cap over the containment area compatible, to the extent possible, with the intended future commercial use of the property; • Solidification/stabilization of identified principal threat waste to form a sub-cap (3 to 4-ft in thickness) beneath the multi-layer cap; • Operation & maintenance of the cap and containment system; • Long-term monitoring of the containment system; • Institutional controls to restrict future use of the Site to commercial uses compatible with the remedy; and • Five-year reviews of the remedy to ensure protectiveness is maintained

The former Escambia Wood Treating Company property is currently abandoned, and all structures associated with past operations have been demolished. The most prominent features on the property are the ~255,000 cubic yards contaminated Soil Stockpile and the corresponding excavation pits. A debris pile consisting primarily of concrete rubble is located on the southeast corner of the property. The Site is fenced to prevent unauthorized access, and mowing and periodic maintenance inspections are performed by the U.S. Army Corps of Engineers, Mobile District. The Rosewood Terrace/Oak Park/Escambia Arms neighborhood residents have been permanently relocated, and the former dwellings have been demolished. This neighborhood has been fenced to prevent unauthorized access. The Pearl Street & Hermann Avenue neighborhood residents have been permanently relocated with the exception of one resident with two contiguous parcels on the southeast corner of Pearl Street. The former dwellings have been demolished, but the neighborhood has open access since it still has a resident. The Palafox Industrial Park continues to operate as a commercial/light industrial area. The Clarinda Triangle area is a mix of commercial and residential properties with businesses concentrated along the main roads and around sixty residences in the neighborhood area. Ground water beneath the site is not currently used for supply, but is part of an aquifer that is used for municipal supply.

The Escambia Board of County Commissioners designated the ETC Site a Community Redevelopment Area in 1995. EPA Region 4 subsequently awarded a redevelopment grant to Escambia County to develop a reuse plan for the Site. Escambia County, in consultation with the area residents and interested stakeholders in the community, produced the Palafox Commerce Park Master Plan to encompass redevelopment of the former Escambia Wood Treating Company property and surrounding impacted properties following the relocation of the residents and cleanup of the Site. The plan envisions a mixture of commercial/retail and light manufacturing with 600,000 to 650,000 sq. ft. of new development. Figure 23 presents the conceptual reuse for the ETC Site as presented in the Palafox Commerce Park Master Plan. The expected future land use for the Site is commercial/ industrial, and this cleanup decision is based on that use. Ground water use is not expected to change prior to the selection of a remedy for OU-2 (Ground Water).
