= Dubose Oil Products Co. =

2004 US Environmental law

Coordinates: 30.617°N 87.377°W

Dubose Oil Products Company
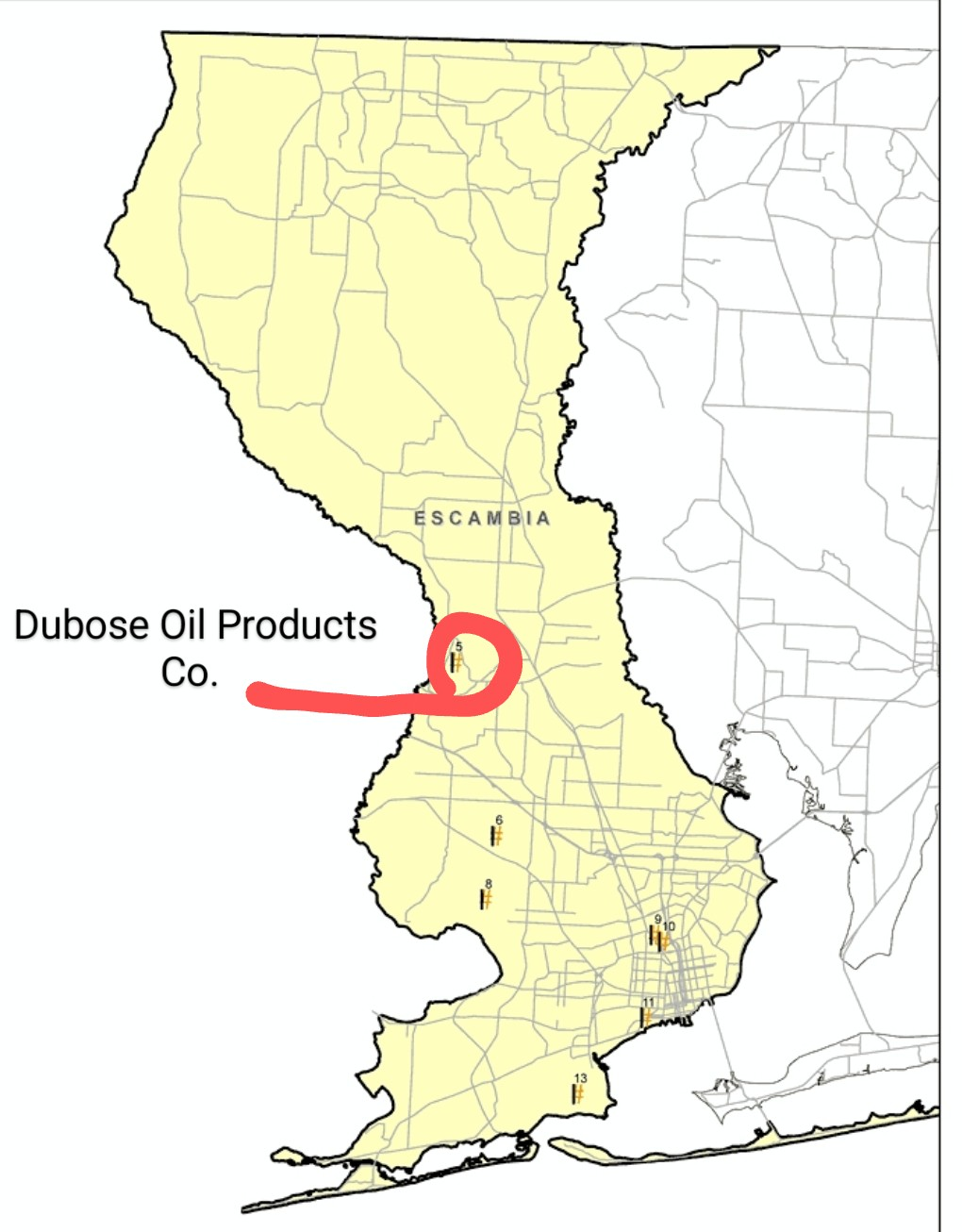
- Decided: 2004

Case history
- Related action: Superfund Site

Keywords
- Environmental law

The Dubose Oil Products Company was located near Highway C97 in the Cantonment, Florida area.

== History ==
The vicinity of this 10-acre site is in Escambia County, Florida. Which is located in a residential rural area near Cantonment, Florida. This site is about 10 miles north of the city of Pensacola, Florida.

The Dubose Oil Products Company included two retention ponds that were built to contain natural spring seepage and stormwater runoff. Within the surrounding area to the North there is Agricultural land with a bordering undeveloped forest. Also, residential areas border the site both to the south and east.The opposite side to the west is bordered by tree farms. For at least two years, from 1979 until 1981 this company facilitated a recycling and disposal and waste storage treatment plant.

The operations at this facility included but was not limited to the recovery of waste oil from reusable oil products, refining oil-based and petroleum waste solvents. Also, the plant facilitated a vast processing area including three ponds. In 1986, the U.S. Environmental Protection Agency listed this site on the Superfund National Priorities Program. This location became a Superfund site due to contamination of groundwater, soil and surface water that occurred from facility operations.

Soil was contaminated by VOCs, PAHs and PCP and groundwater by VOCs, from a former waste processing facility. After cleanup, no hazardous substances remain on site at levels considered harmful.

In 2004, after many years following mandatory cleanup activities this was eventually deleted off the EPA's site list from the NPL. However, due to the history and circumstances of this site it remains to not be in use currently.

This site and location was investigated by (PRPs) or potentially responsible parties, the EPA and the Florida Department of Environmental Protection (FDEP). After the initial findings of this sites conditions proper steps were taken in order to 'protect people and the environment.'

Presently there is no contamination at this site or location. As well, the past issues of contaminants no longer threaten people residing in or working near the area. The above named agencies proactive cleanup efforts and involvement continue to uphold the protection of the environment and individuals of the community.

== Current site status ==
The current site status has a long- term remedy. In 1990, selected remediation of this location included but was not limited to digging and the removal of any remaining contaminated soil, to use eco-friendly, natural or living organisms for the purpose of breaking down any further traces of soil contamination, to efficiently drain and maintain any possible backfilling relating to this sites specific holding ponds with clean soil, to remove any and all site specific structures, grading and properly revegetating any places with dugout areas, to require installation of effective surface water runoff areas, continue to monitor groundwater, and placing any useful and necessary institutional boundary on the site of the property to limit use of the land.

== Area sampling and monitoring ==
The long-term remediation of superfund sites include a monitored samples phase. During such specific phase this sites' remediation was satisfied and was in effect then deleted from the EPAs National Priorities List in 2004. Also, pertaining to the remedial satisfaction of the monitoring and sampling phase the EPA did not require any additional Reviews.

== See also ==
- List of Superfund sites in Florida

== General references ==
- Localpulse.com Newsletter
