= American Agricultural Chemical Company =

The American Agricultural Chemical Company (AACC, est. 1899) was a Connecticut-based conglomerate of industrial producers of phosphate fertilizers. Originally concentrated in the Northern and Eastern US, their business quickly expanded to the Southern States and to Cuba. They became the largest manufacturer of fertilizers in North America, with the brand "Agrico Fertilizer". In 1963, AACC was acquired by the Continental Oil Company, which in 1966 merged it with another division to create the Agrico Chemical Company (ACC). Williams Companies bought ACC in 1972, sold off many of its assets, and split the company into American and Canadian divisions. The Canadian division became Agrico Canada L.P., and is now owned by Sollio Cooperative Group.

From 1914 until a fire there in around 1954, AACC operated a facility producing superphosphate in Cayce, South Carolina, with a fertilizer storage building, acid chamber building and water reservoir.
