= Foreston, South Carolina =

- Census-designated place
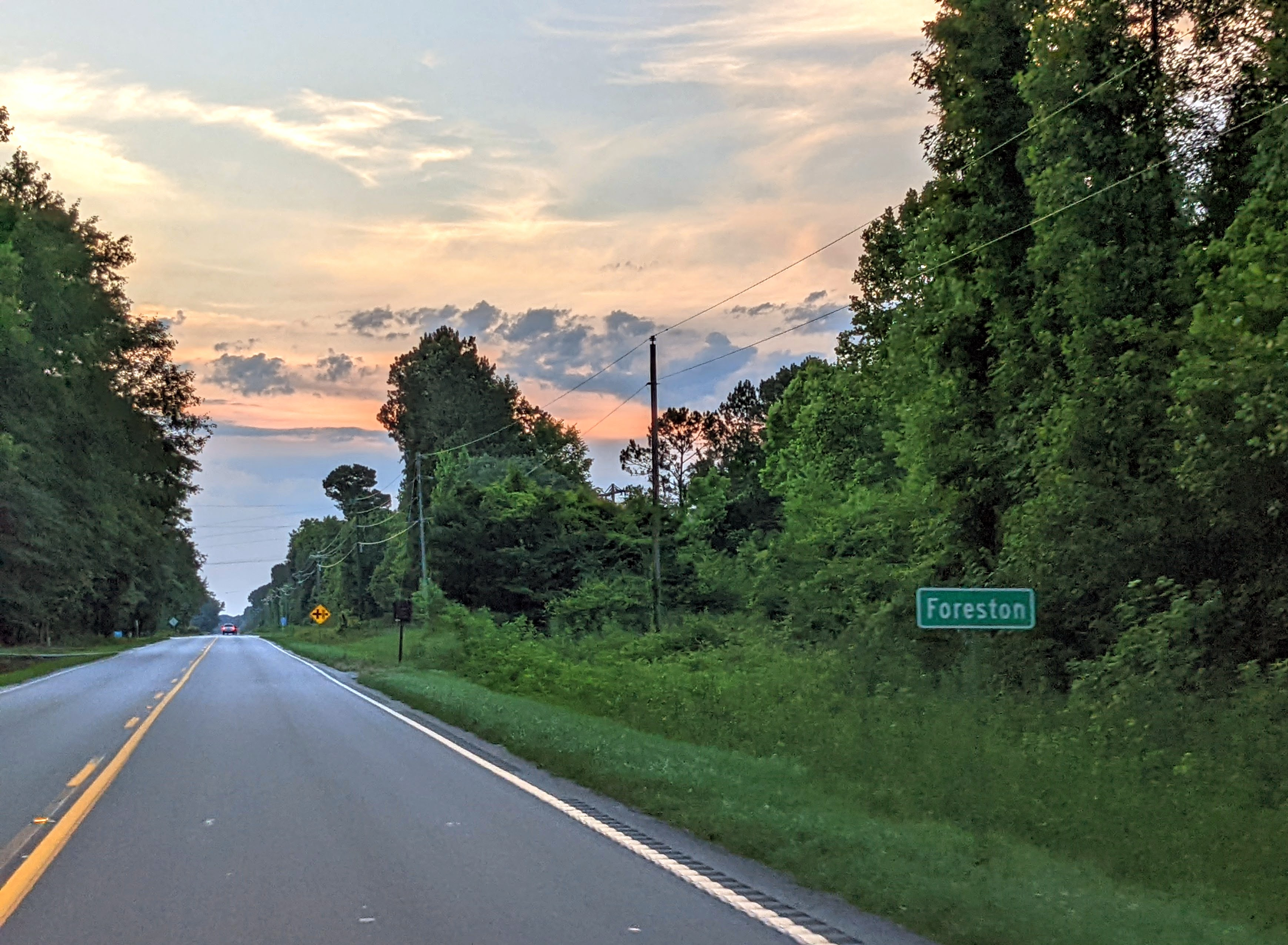
- Entering Foreston

- Location within South Carolina Location within the United States
- Coordinates: 33°37′42″N 80°03′48″W
- Country: United States
- State: South Carolina
- County: Clarendon

Area
  - Total: 2.27 sq mi (5.89 km^{2})
  - Land: 2.27 sq mi (5.89 km^{2})
  - Water: 0 sq mi (0.00 km^{2})
- Elevation: 95 ft (29 m)

Population (2020)
  - Total: 159
  - Density: 69.9/sq mi (26.98/km^{2})
- Time zone: UTC-5 (Eastern (EST))
  - Summer (DST): UTC-4 (EDT)
- ZIP Code: 29102 (Manning)
- Area codes: 803/839
- FIPS code: 45-26485
- GNIS feature ID: 2812945

Foreston is an unincorporated community and census-designated place (CDP) in Clarendon County, South Carolina, United States. It was first listed as a CDP prior to the 2020 census with a population of 159.

The CDP is in eastern Clarendon County, along U.S. Route 521, 9 miles (14 km) southeast of Manning, the county seat, and 51 miles (82 km) northwest of Georgetown. The Lane Subdivision railway of CSX Transportation runs through the center of Foreston, parallel to US 521.

== Demographics ==
Historical population
Census	Pop.	Note	%±
2020	159		—
U.S. Decennial Census; 2020

Foreston first appeared as a census designated place in the 2020 U.S. census.

=== 2020 census ===
Foreston CDP, South Carolina – Demographic Profile (NH = Non-Hispanic) Note: the US Census treats Hispanic/Latino as an ethnic category. This table excludes Latinos from the racial categories and assigns them to a separate category. Hispanics/Latinos may be of any race.
Race / Ethnicity	Pop 2020	% 2020
White alone (NH)	27	16.98%
Black or African American alone (NH)	125	78.62%
Native American or Alaska Native alone (NH)	0	0.00%
Asian alone (NH)	0	0.00%
Native Hawaiian or Pacific Islander alone (NH)	0	0.00%
Other race alone (NH)	0	0.00%
Mixed race or Multiracial (NH)	4	2.52%
Hispanic or Latino (any race)	3	1.89%
Total	159	100.00%

== Education ==
The school district is Clarendon School District 2.
