= American Creosote Works (Pensacola Plant) =

Superfund site Pensacola, Florida

- Superfund site
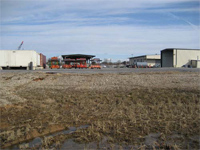

- Location within Florida
- Location: Pensacola, Escambia County, Florida; 30°24′17″N 87°14′12″W

Information
- CERCLIS ID: FLD008161994
- Contaminants: VOCs, PAHs, Pentachlorophenol, dioxin
- Responsible parties: EPA, COE

Progress
- Proposed: December 30, 1982
- Listed: September 8, 1983

The American Creosote Works Superfund site is an inactive wood-treating facility in Pensacola, Florida. The 18-acre site is located about 600 yards north of the confluence of Bayou Chico and Pensacola Bay at 701 S "J" Street. The Superfund program of the United States Environmental Protection Agency (EPA) is responsible for cleaning up the nation's most contaminated land and responding to environmental emergencies, oil spills, and natural disasters.

== History ==
The plant operated from 1902 until 1981, when the company filed for bankruptcy. Before 1950, creosote was the primary wood preservative chemical, and after 1950 pentachlorophenol (PCP) became the preferred chemical. Prior to 1970, operators discharged liquid process wastes into two onsite, unlined, percolation ponds which were allowed to overflow into Bayou Chico and Pensacola Bay. Later, workers drew wastewaters off the ponds periodically and discharged them into designated "spillage areas" on site. Additional discharges occurred when heavy rainfall flooded the ponds, which then overflowed their dikes.

EPA placed the site on the Superfund program's National Priorities List (NPL) in 1983 because of contaminated soil and groundwater resulting from facility operations.

As of 2017, the total cost to remedy the site was estimated to be $35.3 million.

== Contamination concerns ==
The site is in a predominantly residential area with some commercial use, directly south of the intersection of Barrancas Avenue and West Main Street. Though the area is served by municipal water supplies, numerous residents and businesses operate private irrigation wells. Major contaminants in the soil, sediment, and groundwater are volatile organic compounds (VOCs), polycyclic aromatic hydrocarbons (PAHs), PCP, and dioxins and dioxin-like compounds from the former wood-treating processes.

== See also ==
- List of Superfund sites in Florida
