= Beulah Landfill =

Superfund site in Escambia County, Florida

Coordinates: 30.518°N 87.345°W

The Beulah Landfill Superfund Site is a 101-acre (41 ha) Superfund site located in Escambia County, Florida, about 10 miles (16 km) northwest of downtown Pensacola, Florida. The site is surrounded by pine woods in all directions but the south. It is lying undeveloped and in use as a model airplane field. A timber company owns a majority of the surrounding property which it uses as timber farms.

== History ==
Escambia County used the landfill from 1950 to 1984. The landfill was operated in two sections, bisected by Coffee Creek, with the northern section accepting normal municipal waste. The southern section initially accepted industrial waste. This waste was buried in unlined cells, anywhere between 4 and 35 feet (1.2 and 10.7 m) deep. In 1968, the southern section began accepting domestic sludge and sewage, and municipal sludge leftover from wastewater treatment operations. This waste was buried in unlined holding and drying ponds, which were later filled with construction and demolition debris when they became saturated. The ponds were covered over in 1976, however, the following year sludge was again deposited on top of the ponds. Before the landfill was closed in 1999, the site's northern and southern sections were run separately. In 1980, a Florida Department of Environmental Regulation inspection of the site observed leachate from the site flowing into Coffee Creek. The site closed as a landfill in 1984. An investigation by the state of Florida in 1987 found that the groundwater and soil had been contaminated. The site was on the National Priorities List in 1990 but was deleted in 1998.

== Contamination ==
In 1990, on-site contaminants at "probable health concern levels" included lead, thallium, benzene, chloroform, chlordane, and polychlorinated biphenyls. The contaminants could easily drain out of the property, with part of the site built on easily draining sand from the original course of the Coffee Creek, and six 10-inch (25 cm) drainage pipes drained directly into the nearby Eleven Mile Creek. Waste had also been released into the creek due to several ruptures of the containing clay berm in the past.

== See also ==
- List of Superfund sites
