= Airlake Terminal Railway =

Overview
- Parent company: Progressive Rail, Inc.
- Headquarters: Lakeville, Minnesota
- Reporting mark: ALT, ALKX
- Locale: Minnesota
- Dates of operation: 2002–

Technical
- Track gauge: 4 ft 8 1/2 in (1,435 mm) standard gauge

The Airlake Terminal Railway (reporting mark ALT, ALKX), a subsidiary of Progressive Rail, is a short line railroad operating approximately 2.35 miles (3.78 km) of track in a large industrial park in Lakeville, Minnesota. Typical traffic includes various bulk commodities and cargo for trans-shipment to trucks at warehouses operated in conjunction with its parent company, Progressive Rail.
