= Alcolu Railroad =

Overview
- Dates of operation: 1902–1936
- Successor: none

Technical
- Track gauge: 4 ft 8 1/2 in (1,435 mm) standard gauge

The Alcolu Railroad was a shortline railroad that served South Carolina in the early 20th century. It was incorporated in 1902 to help to carry passengers and freight from Alcolu, South Carolina, in Clarendon County, to Beulah, which was renamed Olanta. Freight service was extended to Ham, in Florence County. For a short time, a passenger service ran from Olanta to Kirby once a week.

== Route ==
- Alcolu, junction with Central Railroad of South Carolina, later (Atlantic Coast Line)
- McLeod, 2 miles
- Harby, 5 miles
- DuRant, 7 miles
- Gable, 11 miles (after 1914 when Black River Cypress built mill)
- Sardinia, 12 miles
- Gamble's Store, 14 miles (Renamed New Zion after Gamble's death)
- Beards, 15 miles
- Coles, 17 miles (Renamed Seloc in 1905]
- Paroda Junction, 20 miles, junction with Paroda Railroad
- Hudson, 21 miles
- Beulah, 25 miles, (Renamed Olanta in 1908)
- Kirby, 29 miles [Passenger service once a week]
- Ham, 32.8 miles [Freight service only]

== Closure ==
It was abandoned on June 4, 1936.
