= Boxcar =

Enclosed railroad car used to carry freight

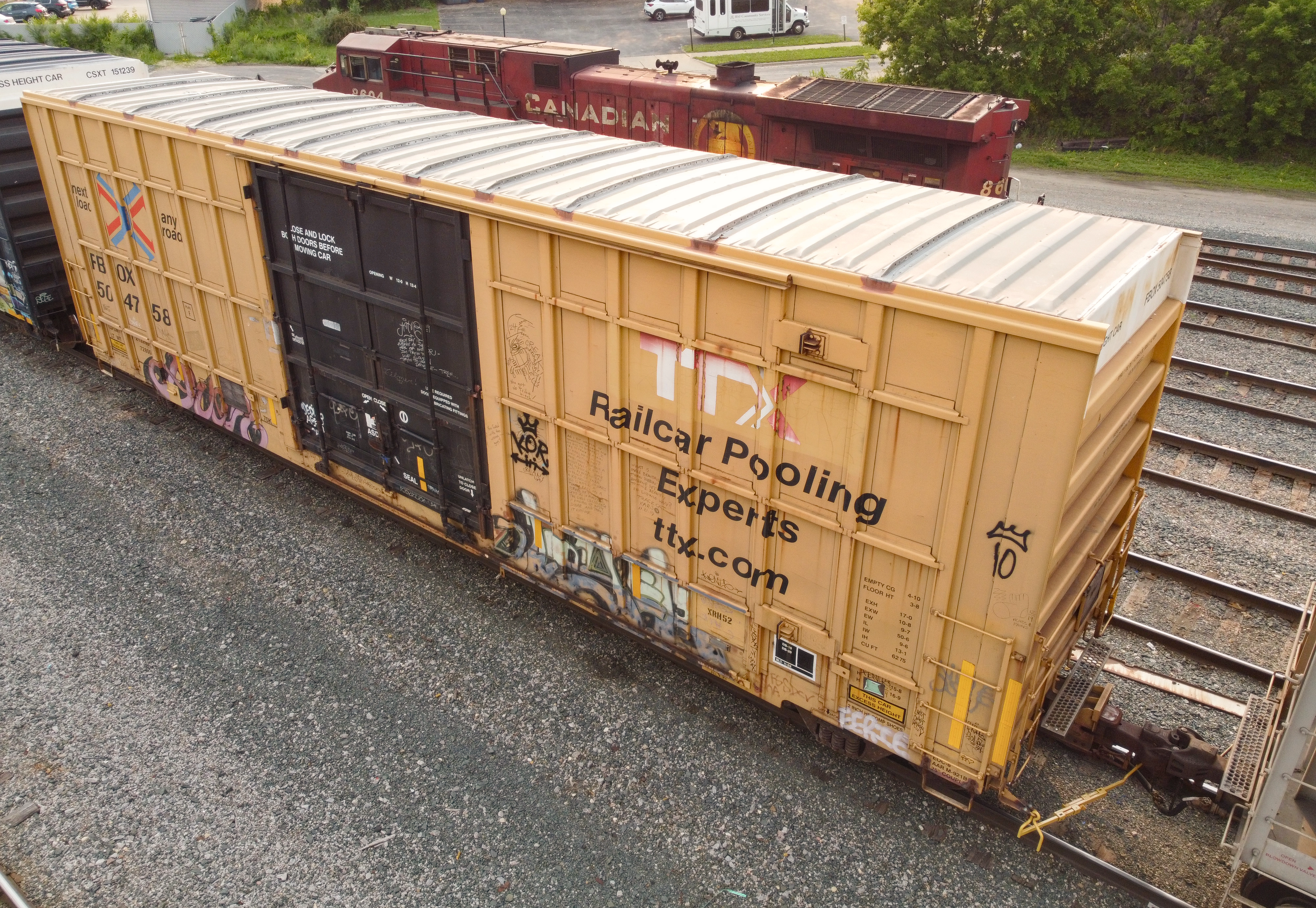
Box car owned by TTX

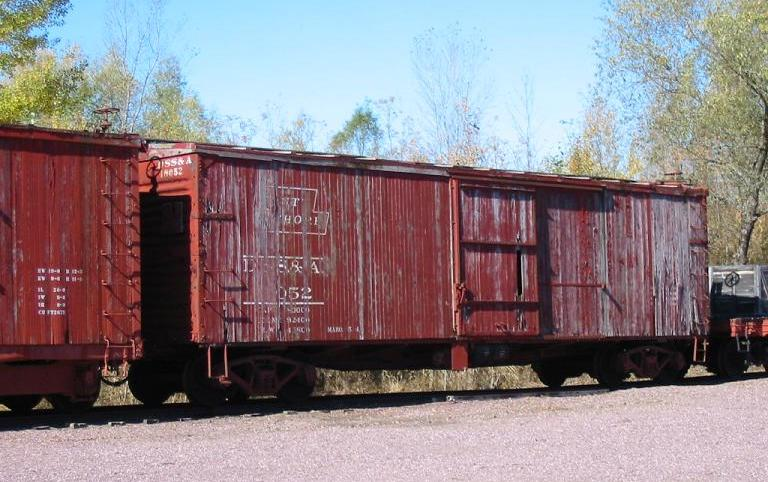
A wooden-bodied Duluth, South Shore and Atlantic Railway boxcar on display at the Mid-Continent Railway Museum in North Freedom, Wisconsin

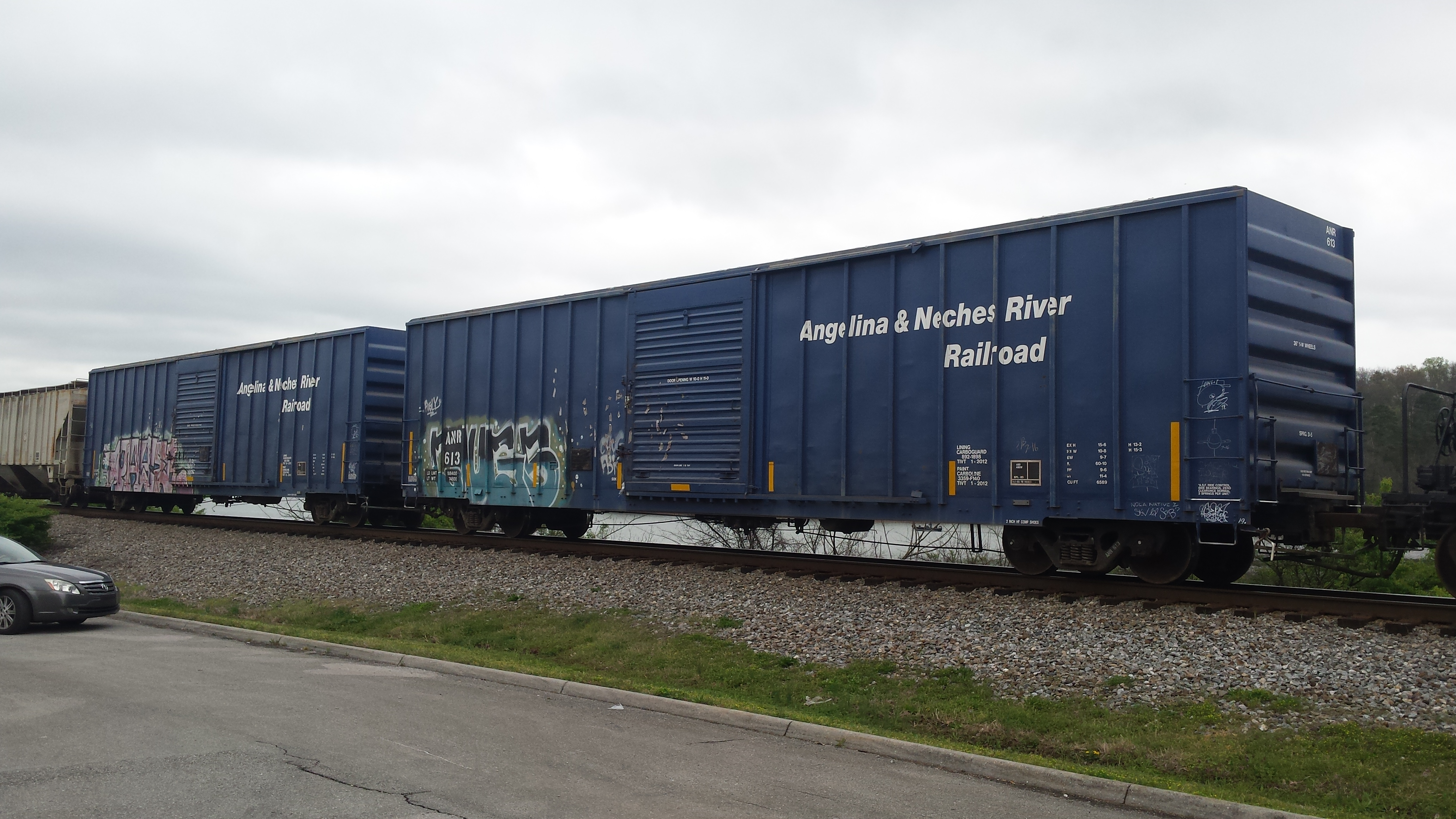
ANR Boxcars on a freight travelling through Farragut, Tennessee.

A boxcar is the North American (AAR) and South Australian Railways term for a railroad car that is enclosed and generally used to carry freight. The boxcar, while not the simplest freight car design, is considered one of the most versatile since it can carry most loads. Boxcars have side sliding doors of varying size and operation, and some include end doors and adjustable bulkheads to load very large items.

Similar covered freight cars outside North America are covered goods wagons and, depending on the region, are called goods van (UK and Australia), covered wagon (UIC and UK) or simply van (UIC, UK and Australia). (Note: An exception in Australia was the former South Australian Railways, which adopted US practices and terminologies; it used the term "boxcar".)

== Use ==
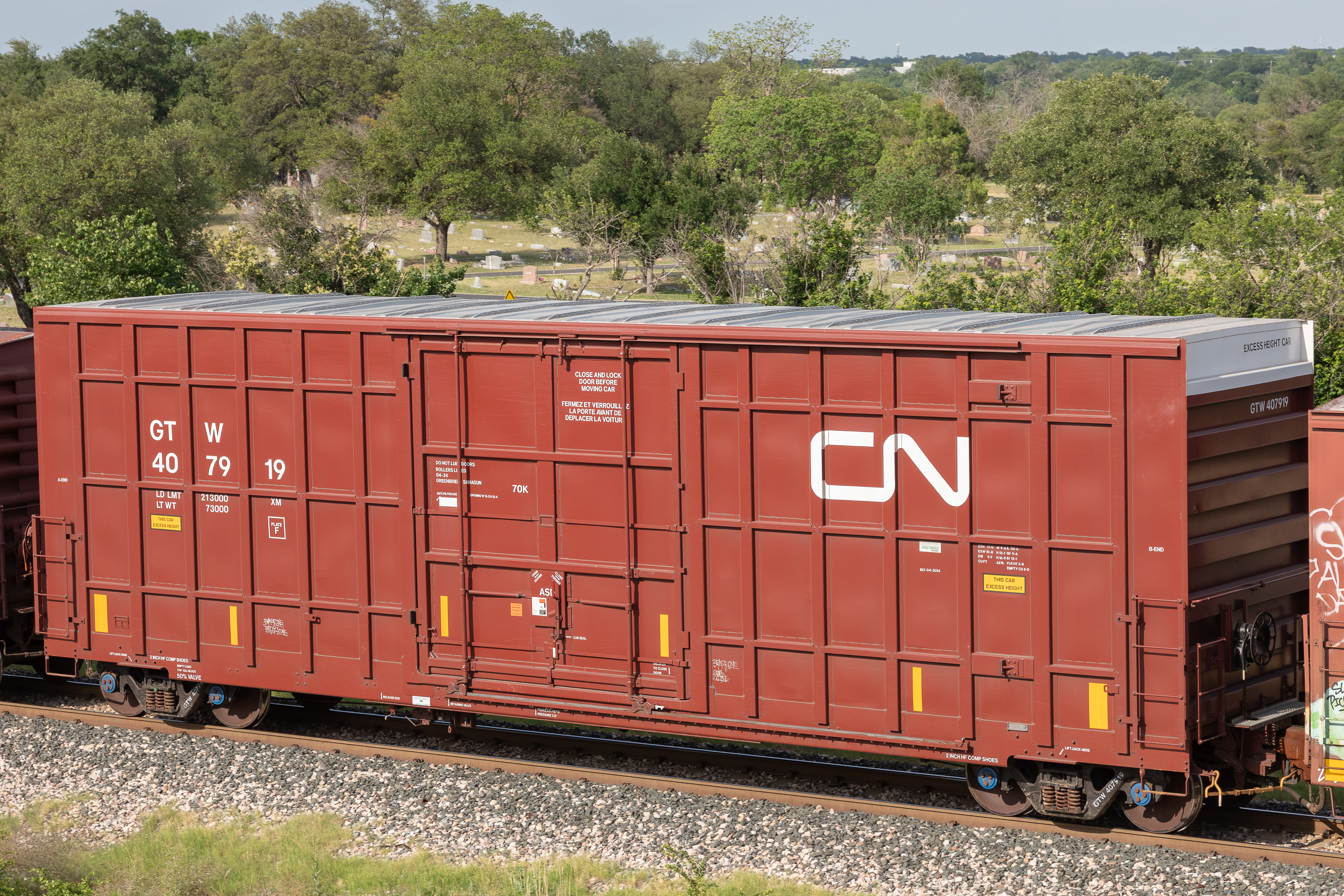
A hicube boxcar

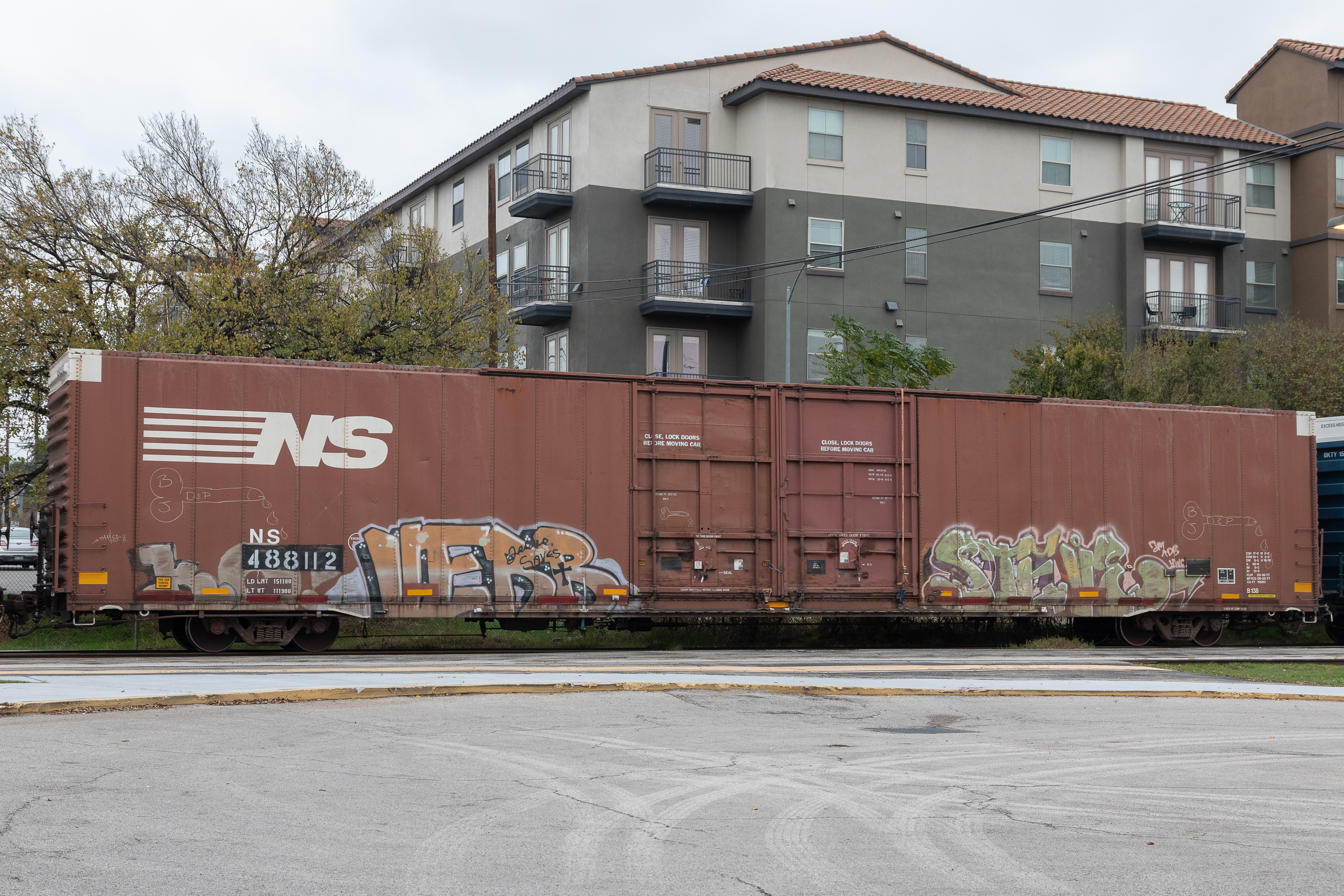
An 86 foot long boxcar used for the transport of automobile parts

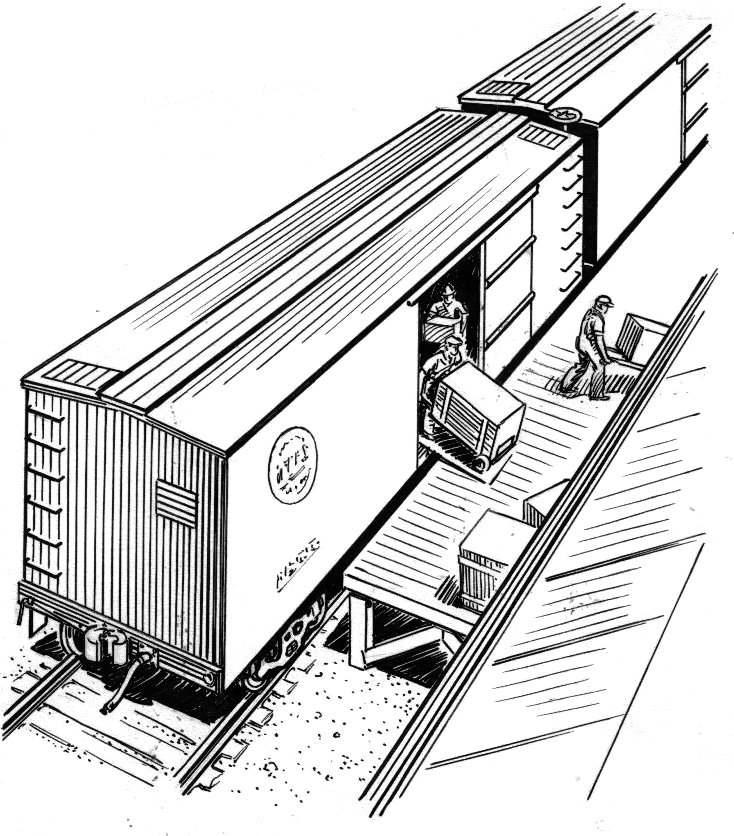
Illustration of a boxcar being unloaded by means of a wheelbarrow

Boxcars can carry most kinds of freight. Originally they were hand-loaded, but in more recent years mechanical assistance such as forklifts have been used to load and empty them faster. Their generalized design is still slower to load and unload than specialized designs of car, and this partially explains the decline in boxcar numbers since World War II. The other cause for this decline is the dramatic shift of waterborne cargo transport to container shipping. Effectively a boxcar without the wheels and chassis, a container is designed to be amenable to intermodal freight transport, whether by container ships, trucks or flatcars, and can be delivered door-to-door.

Boxcars were used for bulk commodities such as coal, particularly in the Midwestern United States in the early 20th century. This use was sufficiently widespread that several companies developed competing box-car loaders to automate coal loading. By 1905, 350 to 400 such machines were in use, mostly at Midwestern coal mines.

=== Passenger use ===
In the Philippines, boxcars were used as additional third-class accommodations by the Manila Railway Company during the early 1900s as there was a shortage of true passenger railroad cars. These problems were considered solved by the 1910s as British manufacturer Metropolitan and American builders such as Harlan and Hollingsworth constructed more passenger cars for the railroad.

In the present day, hobos and migrant workers have often used boxcars in their journeys (see freighthopping), since they are enclosed and cannot be seen by railroad police, as well as being insulated to some degree from cold weather. Hobo code, a form of hieroglyphs used by hobos, developed as a code to give information to Hobos freighthopping.

== Hicube boxcar ==
In the 21st century, high cubic capacity (hicube) boxcars have become more common in the US. These are taller than regular boxcars and as such can only run on routes with increased clearance (see loading gauge and structure gauge). The excess height section of the car end is often painted with a white band to be easily visible if wrongly assigned to a low-clearance line.

The internal height of the 86-foot (26.21 m) hicube boxcars originally used in automotive parts service was generally 12 feet 9 inches (3.89 m).

== See also ==
- Autorack – Railway rolling stock used to transport automobiles
- General Utility Van – Enclosed railway wagon used by British Rail to carry mail and parcels
- Railbox – American owner of boxcars
- Refrigerator car – Railroad car designed to carry perishable freight at specific temperatures
- Stock car – Rolling stock used for carrying livestock on railways
- Troop sleeper – Type of military railroad passenger car
