= Ashland Railway =

Overview
- Headquarters: Mansfield, Ohio
- Reporting mark: ASRY
- Locale: North-Central Ohio
- Dates of operation: 1986–

Technical
- Track gauge: 4 ft 8 1/2 in (1,435 mm) standard gauge

Other
- Website: http://www.ashlandrailway.com

The Ashland Railway (reporting mark ASRY) is a Class III railroad shortline railroad based in Mansfield, Ohio and operating within North Central Ohio. Since its inception in 1986, Ashland Railway has grown to provide service 24 hours a day 7 days a week along 55 miles of track to industries within Ashland, Huron, Richland and Wayne counties.

ASRY interchanges with the Norfolk Southern Railway in Mansfield, the Wheeling & Lake Erie Railway in Plymouth, and CSX Transportation (CSXT) in Willard. The shortline operates on two separate segments that connect in Mansfield. One line runs northeast through Ashland to terminate in West Salem; the other northwest to Willard through Plymouth and Shelby.

Ashland's "original" main line, which began operations in 1986, was purchased from Conrail. This line's heritage goes back to the Erie Lackawanna Railway (EL) and was a segment in its Chicago - New York main line. After Conrail took control of the Erie Lackawanna, large segments of its trackage were deemed redundant. The portions east of West Salem and west of Mansfield were removed around 1984. Conrail retained ownership of the EL line between Mansfield and Ontario to service a GM plant. The crossing with Conrail's Ft. Wayne Line (former Pennsylvania Railroad) was removed, and spur tracks were built to interchange traffic on either side. The railway built a spur line to serve an industrial park in Ashland.

The second portion of the Ashland Railway is the Willard to Mansfield section. This was operated by the Baltimore and Ohio Railroad as a line from the docks on Lake Erie through the city of Mt. Vernon to south-central Ohio,. Because of economic downturns in the 1980s, freight traffic declined drastically on this line and it was later reduced to a branch line between Willard and Mansfield. By 1990, the new CSX Transportation was ready to part with this line and sold it to the Ashland Railway. Before the purchase of this CSX line, the Ashland had been limited to only one interchange, with Conrail in Mansfield.

In the village of Plymouth, the line passed the former Plymouth Locomotive Works plant, shuttered since 1999.

In 1924, the Chesapeake and Ohio Railway bought the Ashland Coal and Iron Railway, a separate company from the current one with a similar name.
