= TTX Company =

American railcar management company

- Formerly: TrailerTrain
- Type: Private
- Industry: Freight car provider
- Founded: November 1955; 70 years ago
- Founders: Norfolk & Western Railway; Pennsylvania Railroad; Rail-Trailer Corp.
- Headquarters: Charlotte, North Carolina, United States
- Area served: North America
- Key people: Marty Thomas, President and CEO
- Parent: BNSF Railway; Canadian National Railway; Canadian Pacific Kansas City; CSX Corporation; Ferromex; Norfolk Southern Railway; Union Pacific Railroad
- Subsidiaries: Railbox; Railgon
- Website: www.ttx.com

TTX Company (formerly TrailerTrain) is a provider of railcars and related freight car management services to the North American rail industry. As of 2026, TTX's pool of railcars consists of over 180,000 cars including intermodal well cars, flatcars, boxcars, autoracks, and gondolas.

== History ==
TTX was founded as TrailerTrain in 1955 by Norfolk & Western Railway, Pennsylvania Railroad, and Rail-Trailer Corporation. Pennsylvania Railroad employees—6,000 in total—entered possible names in a drawing for the new company, and the name "Trailer Train" won. TrailerTrain's original goals were to standardize TOFC railcar practices, foster the growth of transportation, provide its members with the best available equipment at the lowest cost, and keep its members abreast of new developments. In 1991, the company changed its company name from TrailerTrain to TTX.

TTX operates under pooling authority granted by the Surface Transportation Board. The flatcar pool was first approved in 1974 and then reauthorized in 1989, 1994, 2004, and most recently on October 1, 2014, for a 15-year term.

In late 2023, TTX announced it was relocating its headquarters and 150 employees from Chicago to Charlotte, North Carolina in Spring 2024.

== Fleet ==
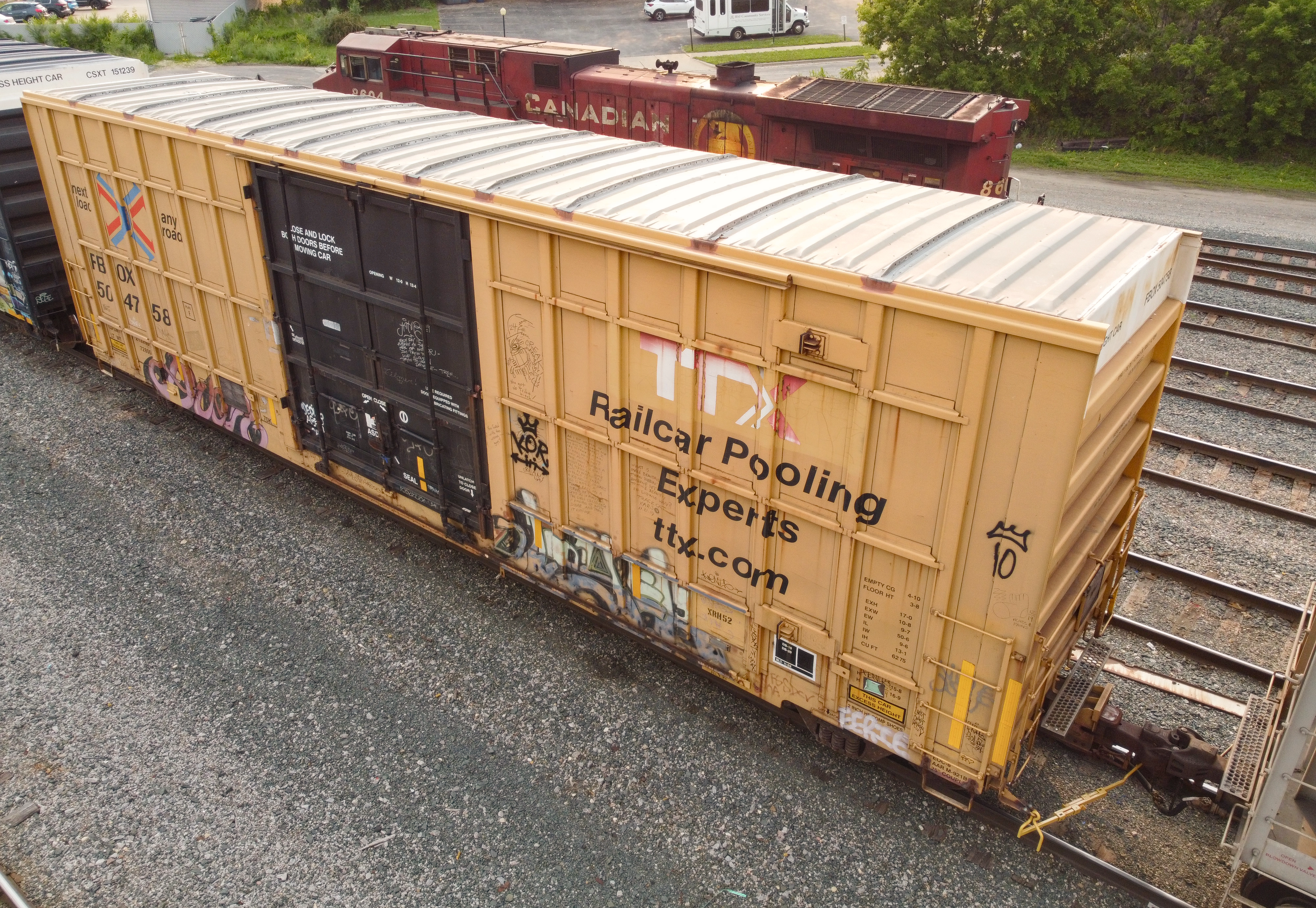
Box car owned by TTX

TTX's railcar fleet consists of flatcars, autoracks, boxcars and gondolas. Half of the fleet is dedicated to flatcars and intermodal wells, with a quarter dedicated to auto racks for hauling finished vehicles. The remaining quarter of the pool includes boxcars, gondolas, and specialized flatcars to carry various general merchandise commodities. TTX provides standardized car types and re-purposes idle assets to serve a dynamic marketplace.

The fleet is maintained through a network of independent repair facilities, TTX-owned Field Maintenance Operations (FMOs) located at intermodal terminals throughout North America, and TTX-owned heavy repair shops located in:

- Jacksonville, Florida
- North Augusta, South Carolina
- Waterford Township, Michigan
- Mira Loma, California

== Ownership ==
TTX is privately owned by North America's railroads and is the industry's railcar cooperative. The major railroads listed below all own shares of the company, with a voting member from each railroad making up the TTX Board of Directors.

- BNSF Railway
- Canadian National Railway
- Canadian Pacific Kansas City
- CSX Corporation
- Ferromex
- Norfolk Southern Railway
- Union Pacific Railroad

== Logo ==
A 1970s era logo.

A former logo of the company, used from 1991 to 2008, when it was replaced.

Between 1991 and 2008, the company used a yellow and black logo with speed lines connecting the two T's and an X.

In March 2008, the company released a new logo, colored Tuscan red, in honor of one of the founding railroads, the Pennsylvania Railroad.

== See also ==
- List of rolling stock manufacturers
- Rail terminology
