= Soil stockpile =

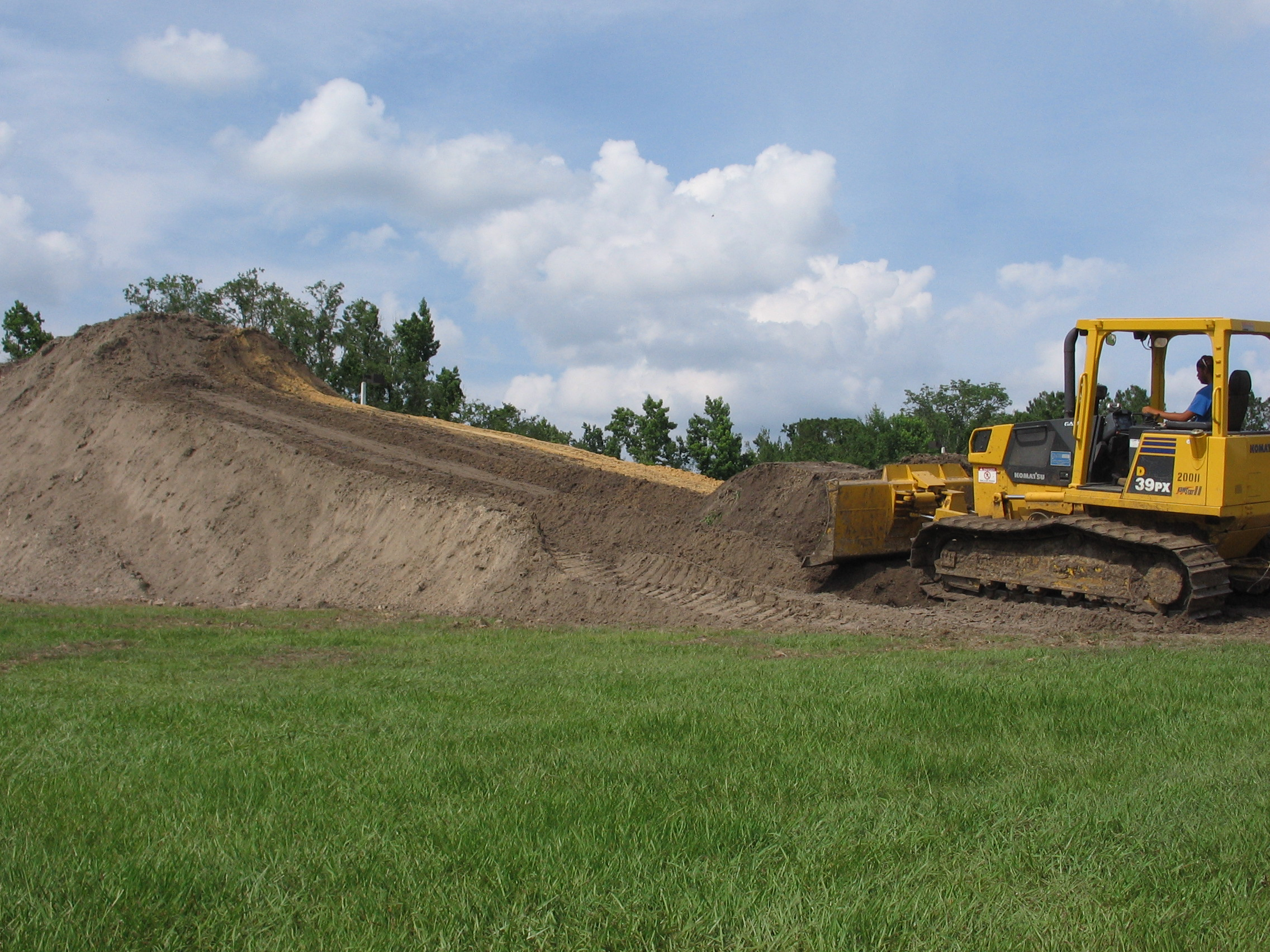
Small dozer forming soil stockpile

A soil stockpile is formed with excavated topsoil during the construction of buildings or infrastructure. It is considered to be an important resource in construction and ecology. Soil is stockpiled for later use in landscaping or restoration of the region following the removal of construction infrastructure. Before re-use, stockpiled soil may be tested for contamination.
