= Railbox =

American owner of boxcars

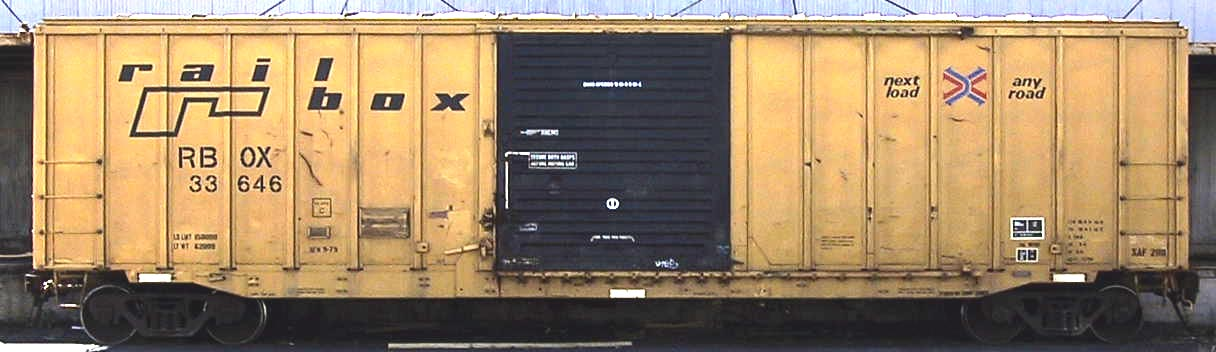
- A Railbox XAF20B class boxcar in the 1996 paint scheme

Overview
- Parent company: TTX Company
- Headquarters: Charlotte, North Carolina, United States
- Reporting mark: ABOX, FBOX, RBOX, TBOX, TOBX
- Dates of operation: 1974–

Technical
- Track gauge: 1,435 mm (4 ft 8 1/2 in)

Railbox Company (reporting marks ABOX, FBOX, RBOX, TBOX), founded in 1974, is a North American boxcar pooling company, and a subsidiary of the North Carolina–based TTX Company. It was created to address a boxcar shortage in the United States in the 1970s.

The concept behind Railbox, as evidenced by the slogan, "Next Load, Any Road" was, because Railbox was jointly owned by many of the railroads as a privately owned cooperative, these boxcars were not subject to load/empty rules. Railbox cars could be assigned for service on any railroad in Canada, Mexico and the United States on lines where an AAR Plate-C loading gauge is permitted. Railbox purchased boxcars from many manufacturers, including American Car and Foundry Company, FMC Corporation, and Pullman-Standard (P-S).

== See also ==
- Demurrage
- Railgon Company
