= American Refrigerator Transit Company =

Former company

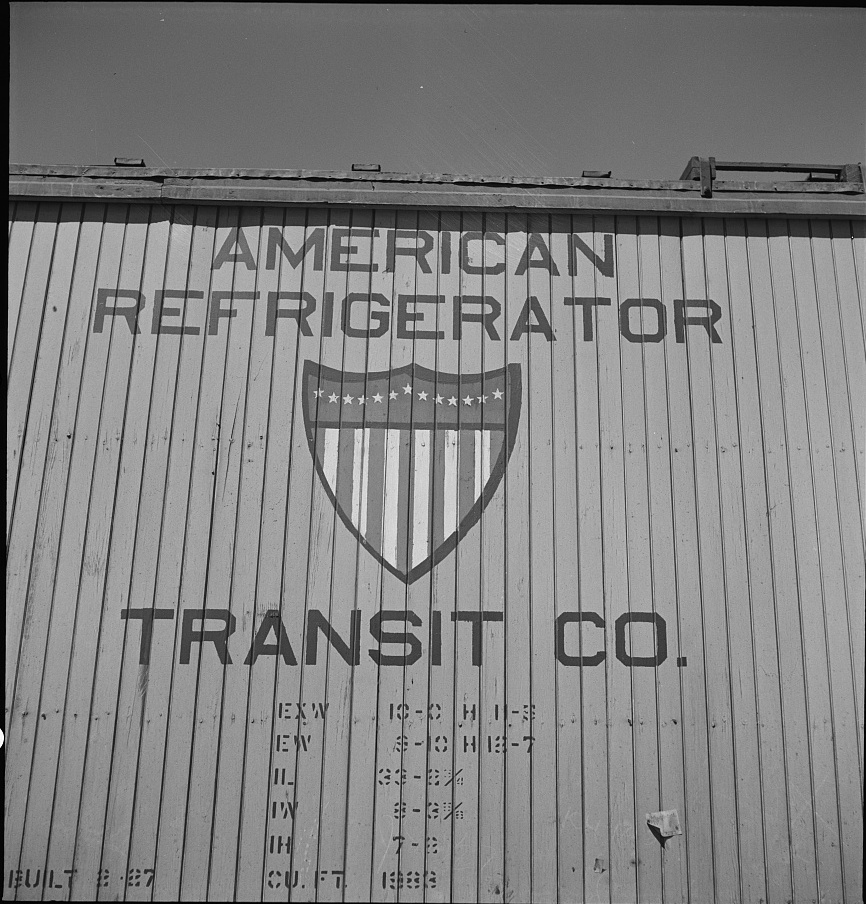
Detail on an American Refrigerator Transit car, 1943.

The American Refrigerator Transit Company (ART) was a St. Louis, Missouri-based private refrigerator car line established in 1881 by the Missouri Pacific and Wabash railroads. It is now a subsidiary of the Union Pacific Corporation.

American Refrigerator Transit Company, 1900–1970:

1900	1910	1920	1930	1940	1950	1960	1970
1,500	—	3,000*	12,500*	13,000*	11,457	9,670	6,158

*estimated.

Source: The Great Yellow Fleet, p. 16.
