= Agrico Chemical Co. =

Superfund site

Coordinates: 30°27′00″N 87°13′30″W

Agrico Chemical Co. is a Superfund site located in Pensacola, Florida. The facility operated under different companies from 1881 to 1975, when it was shut down by Agrico Chemical Company. The EPA found radium-226, radium-228, sulfuric acid, lead and fluorides in the groundwater. The facility produced sulfuric acid from pyrite from 1881 to 1920. The EPA believes that the lead and sulfuric acid came from corroding lead tanks that held the sulfuric acid. From 1920 to 1975, the facility produced fertilizer.

By 1979, all of the equipment had been removed from the site.

As of the 2020s, the site has one foundation for a warehouse, and two ponds. Next to the foundation is a mini storage center.
