= List of Louisiana railroads =

The following railroad companies operate in the U.S. state of Louisiana.

== Common freight carriers ==
- Acadiana Railway (AKDN)
- Arkansas, Louisiana and Mississippi Railroad (ALM)
- Baton Rouge Southern Railroad (BRS)
- Bogalusa Bayou Railroad (BBAY)
- BNSF Railway (BNSF)
- Canadian National Railway (CN) through subsidiary Illinois Central Railroad (IC)
- CG Railway (CGR)
- CSX Transportation (CSXT)
- Delta Southern Railroad (DSRR)
- Geaux Geaux Railroad (GOGR)
- Kansas City Southern Railway (KCS)
- Louisiana and Delta Railroad (LDRR)
- Louisiana and North West Railroad (LNW)
- Louisiana Southern Railroad (LAS)
- New Orleans and Gulf Coast Railway (NOGC)
- New Orleans Public Belt Railroad (NOPB)
- North Louisiana and Arkansas Railroad
- Norfolk Southern Railway (NS) through subsidiary Alabama Great Southern Railroad (AGS)
- Ouachita Railroad (OUCH)
- Port Rail (Lake Charles) (PRLC)
- Timber Rock Railroad (TIBR)
  - Operates the Southern Gulf Railway
- Union Pacific Railroad (UP)
- Zee Railroad (ZEE)

== Private freight carriers ==
- East Camden and Highland Railroad

Laurel Valley & Rousseau Station Railroad (n.g. plantation railroad connecting Barker & Lepine properties along Bayou LaForche to one another[mainly cane fields to sugar mill] and to S.P. trunk line).

== Passenger carriers ==
- Amtrak (AMTK)
- New Orleans Regional Transit Authority

== Defunct railroads ==
Name	Mark	System (Note: This is one or more of the Class I railroads that the railroad became part of, if any.)	Miles	From	To	Successor	Notes
Alexandria and Western Railway	A&W		18.50	1909	1925		
Alexandria, Junction City and Shreveport Railroad	AJC&S	RI		June 29, 1897	1899	Arkansas Southern Railroad	
Alexandria and St. Louis Railway		MP		1892	1893	Houston, Central Arkansas and Northern Railway	
Alexandria, Woodworth and Beaumont Railway							
Anacoco Valley Railway							
Angola Transfer Company		KCS		1906	1929	Louisiana Railway and Navigation Company	
Arkansas and Gulf Railroad							
Arkansas, Louisiana and Gulf Railroad				1914	1915	N/A	Leased the Arkansas, Louisiana and Gulf Railway
Arkansas, Louisiana and Gulf Railway	AL&G			1906	1915	Arkansas and Louisiana Midland Railway	
Arkansas and Louisiana Midland Railway	A&LM			1915	1920	Arkansas and Louisiana Missouri Railway	
Arkansas and Louisiana Missouri Railway	A&LM, ALM			1920	1991	Arkansas, Louisiana and Mississippi Railroad	
Arkansas, Louisiana and Southern Railway		KCS		1897	1900	Louisiana and Arkansas Railroad	
Arkansas Southeastern Railway							
Arkansas Southern Railroad	ASRR	RI		1892	1905	Rock Island, Arkansas and Louisiana Railroad	The Arkansas Southern Railroad (formed August 29, 1892) consolidated with the Alexandria, Junction City & Shreveport Railway Company in March 1899, continuing as the Arkansas Southern Railroad Company. Consolidated with the Arkansas Southern Extension Railway, and the Little Rock Southern Railway Company into the Rock Island, Arkansas and Louisiana Railroad on October 31, 1905.
Arkansas and Southern Railway		SSW		1887	1887	St. Louis, Arkansas and Texas Railway	
Arkansas Southern Extension Railway		RI		1903	1905	Rock Island, Arkansas and Louisiana Railroad	Formed November 28, 1903
Atchison, Topeka and Santa Fe Railway	ATSF			1965	1996	Burlington Northern and Santa Fe Railway	
Avoyelles Railroad		MP		1898	1900	Texas and Pacific Railway	
Bastrop and Lake Providence Railway			4.00				
Baton Rouge Grosse Tete and Opelousas Railroad				1853	1883		
Baton Rouge, Hammond and Eastern Railroad		IC		1900	1946	Illinois Central Railroad	
Bernice and Northwestern Railway				1908		N/A	
Black Bayou Railroad				1904		N/A	
Bodcaw Valley Railway			24.00	1904		N/A	
Boston and Little River Railway							
Brimstone Railroad and Canal Company			7.72	1905	1931	N/A	
Calcasieu, Vernon and Shreveport Railroad		KCS	16.50 miles	1880	1897	Kansas City, Shreveport and Gulf Railway	Reference note:
Central Louisiana and Gulf Railroad	CLGR			1981	1987	MidLouisiana Rail Corporation	
Chicago, Rock Island and Pacific Railroad	RI, ROCK	RI	183.43	1947	1980	Central Louisiana and Gulf Railway, South Central Arkansas Railway	Liquidated in January 1980, parts taken over by the Union Pacific railroad between Brinkley and West Memphis and also by the Little Rock and Western railroad between Little Rock and Danville.
Chicago, Rock Island and Pacific Railway	RI	RI		1906	1948	Chicago, Rock Island and Pacific Railroad	
Chicago, St. Louis and New Orleans Railroad		IC		1878	1951	Illinois Central Railroad	
Christie and Eastern Railway			10.50	1917	1934	N/A	From the ghost town of Sandel on the Kansas City Southern Railroad line approximately twelve miles to the mill site at Peason. A line was extended east to connect with the Red River and Gulf Railroad at Kurthwood, with connections to Lecompte.
Cinclare Central Factory Railroad							
Clinton and Port Hudson Railroad		IC		1833	1889	Louisville, New Orleans and Texas Railway	
Colfax and Northern Railway				1901	1903	Louisiana Railway and Navigation Company	Chartered on July 10, 1901 from Aloha to Winnfield. Abandoned prior to the Louisiana and Arkansas Railway merger.
Colorado Southern, New Orleans and Pacific Railroad		MP		1905	1910	New Orleans, Texas and Mexico Railroad	
Commercial Transit Company		IC		1877	1878	New Orleans Belt Railroad	
Delhi, Baskin and Southwestern Railway							
Donaldsonville and Napoleonville Railway		MP		1902	1903	Texas and Pacific Railway	
Dorcheat Valley Railroad				1906		N/A	
East Camden and Highland Railroad	EACH			1983	1990	Ouachita Railroad	
East Louisiana Railroad		GM&O		1887	1905	New Orleans Great Northern Railroad	
Englewood, Alexandria and Southwestern Railroad							
Enterprise Railway				1903	1914	N/A	
Farmerville and Southern Railroad		MP		1903	1909	St. Louis, Iron Mountain and Southern Railway	
Fernwood & Gulf Railroad			44	March 31, 1906	1972	Illinois Central Gulf	Fernwood & Gulf Railroad became Fernwood, Columbia & Gulf Railroad April 17, 1920, with 44 miles (71 km) of track. See: Fernwood Lumber Company The FC&G purchased the unique Brill Model 30 rail bus Car(M-1) in 1930. M-3 had a Ford V-8. Car No.6 was a Jim Crow car.
Franklin and Abbeville Railroad		SP			1903	Franklin and Abbeville Railway	
Franklin and Abbeville Railway		SP		1903	1934	Texas and New Orleans Railroad	
Garyville Northern Railroad				1915	1932	N/A	
Glenmora and Western Railway	G&W						
Gulf, Colorado and Santa Fe Railway		ATSF		1906	1965	Atchison, Topeka and Santa Fe Railway	
Gulf, Mobile and Northern Railroad	GM&N	GM&O		1933	1940	Gulf, Mobile and Ohio Railroad	
Gulf, Mobile and Ohio Railroad	GM&O	GM&O		1940	1972	Illinois Central Gulf Railroad	
Gulf, Sabine and Red River Railroad							
Gulf and Sabine River Railroad				1906	1927	N/A	
Harrisonburg, Mississippi & Tensas River Railway & Navigation Company of Louisiana				1911	1912	N/A	Possibly failed to operate any trains.
Helena Southwestern Railroad							
Houston, Central Arkansas and Northern Railroad		MP		1887	1893	Alexandria and St. Louis Railway	
Houston, Central Arkansas and Northern Railway		MP		1893	1893	St. Louis, Iron Mountain and Southern Railway	
Houston and Shreveport Railroad	HEWT	SP		1891	1934	Texas and New Orleans Railroad	
Iberia, St. Mary and Eastern Railroad		MP		1909	1956	Missouri Pacific Railroad	
Iberia and Vermilion Railroad	I&V	SP		1891	1934	Texas and New Orleans Railroad	
Illinois Central Railroad	IC	IC		1883	1972	Illinois Central Gulf Railroad	
Illinois Central Gulf Railroad	ICG			1972	1988	Illinois Central Railroad	
Jackson Railroad							
Jasper and Eastern Railway		ATSF		1904	1948	Gulf, Colorado and Santa Fe Railway	
Jefferson and Lake Pontchartrain Railroad				1853	1864		
Kansas City, Pittsburg and Gulf Railroad		KCS		1895	1900	Kansas City Southern Railway	
Kansas City, Shreveport and Gulf Railway		KCS		1894	1935	Kansas City Southern Railway	
Kansas City, Shreveport and Gulf Terminal Company		KCS		1897		N/A	
Kansas City, Watkins and Gulf Railway		MP		1887	1902	St. Louis, Watkins and Gulf Railway	
Kentwood and Eastern Railroad					1922	N/A	
Kentwood and Eastern Railway	K&E			1906	1922	N/A	
Kentwood, Greensburg and South Western Railroad				1905	1921	N/A	
Kinder and Northwestern Railroad							
Kingston Railroad							
Lake Charles Railway and Navigation Company				1908		N/A	
Lake Charles and Leesville Railway							
Lake Charles and Northern Railroad	LC&N	SP		1906	1934	Texas and New Orleans Railroad	
Lake Providence, Texarkana and Western Railroad				1911	1930	N/A	
Leesville East and West Railroad							
Leesville, Slagle and Eastern Railway							
Little Rock and Monroe Railway		MP		1903	1909	St. Louis, Iron Mountain and Southern Railway	
Little Rock Southern Railway Company				1903			November 28, 1903
Loranger, Louisiana and Northeastern Railroad				1916	1926	N/A	
Loring and Western Railway							
Louisiana Railway						N/A	
Louisiana Railway and Navigation Company		KCS		1903	1934	Louisiana and Arkansas Railway	
Louisiana and Arkansas Railroad		KCS		1898	1902	Louisiana and Arkansas Railway	
Louisiana and Arkansas Railway	L&A, LA	KCS		1902	1992	Kansas City Southern Railway	
Louisiana Central Railroad				1904		N/A	
Louisiana Central Railroad of Louisiana		MP		1868	1870	New Orleans, Baton Rouge and Vicksburg Railroad	
Louisiana Central Stem Railway		MP		1856	1868	Louisiana Central Railroad of Louisiana	
Louisiana East and West Railway		MP		1904	1907	Texas and Pacific Railway	
Louisiana Midland Railway	LOAM			1974	1981	N/A	
Louisiana Midland Railway		IC		1945	1967	Illinois Central Railroad	
Louisiana Nickel Plate Railway					1908	N/A	
Louisiana North and South Railroad				1885	1890	Louisiana and North West Railroad	
Louisiana and Pacific Railway				1904	1926	N/A	
Louisiana Southern Railway	LSO	SOU		1897	1993	Alabama Great Southern Railroad	
Louisiana Western Railroad	LW	SP		1878	1934	Texas and New Orleans Railroad	
Louisville and Nashville Railroad	L&N, LN	L&N		1880	1983	Seaboard System Railroad	
Louisville, New Orleans and Texas Railway		IC		1884	1892	Yazoo and Mississippi Valley Railroad	
Mandeville and Sulphur Springs Railroad		SOU		1868	1870	New Orleans and Northeastern Railroad	
Mangham and Northeastern Railway				1905		N/A	
Mansfield Railway and Transportation Company				1881	1959	N/A	
Memphis, Helena and Louisiana Railroad		MP		1902	1903	St. Louis, Iron Mountain and Southern Railway	
Mexican Gulf Railway		SOU		1837	1867	Southeastern Railroad	
MidLouisiana Rail Corporation	MDR			1987	1993	Kansas City Southern Railway	
MidSouth Rail Corporation	MSRC			1986	1993	Kansas City Southern Railway	
Mill Creek and Little River Railway and Navigation Company				1905		N/A	
Minden Railroad and Compress Company		KCS		1882	1898	Arkansas, Louisiana and Southern Railway	
Minden East and West Railway		KCS		1906	1909	Louisiana and Arkansas Railway	
Mississippi and La Fourche Railway		MP		1896	1900	Texas and Pacific Railway	
Mississippi, Terre-aux-Boeuf and Lake Railroad		SOU		1877	1886	New Orleans and Gulf Railroad	
Missouri, Kansas and Texas Railway of Texas	MKTT	MKT		1901	1923	Louisiana Railway and Navigation Company	
Missouri and Louisiana Railroad				1902	1914	Neame, Carson and Southern Railroad	
Missouri Pacific Railroad	MP	MP		1917	1997	Union Pacific Railroad	
Monroe and Southwestern Railway				1904		N/A	
Monroe and Texas Railroad							
Morgan's Louisiana and Texas Railroad		SP		1869	1878	Morgan's Louisiana and Texas Railroad and Steamship Company	
Morgan's Louisiana and Texas Railroad and Steamship Company	ML&T	SP		1877	1934	Texas and New Orleans Railroad	
Natchez, Ball and Shreveport Railway						N/A	
Natchez, Red River and Texas Railroad		MP		1881	1897	Natchez and Western Railway	
Natchez, Urania and Ruston Railway				1899	1970	N/A	
Natchez and Western Railway		MP		1904	1905	St. Louis, Iron Mountain and Southern Railway	
Natchitoches Railroad		MP		1887	1893	Natchitoches and Red River Valley Railroad	
Natchitoches Land and Railway Company		MP		1885	1887	Natchitoches Railroad	
Natchitoches and Red River Valley Railroad		MP		1893	1894	Natchitoches and Red River Valley Railway	
Natchitoches and Red River Valley Railway		MP		1894	1901	Texas and Pacific Railway	
Neame, Carson and Southern Railroad	NC&S			1914	1929	N/A	
New Iberia and Northern Railroad	NI&N	MP		1909	1956	Missouri Pacific Railroad	
New Iberia, St. Martin and Northern Railroad		MP		1907	1909	New Iberia and Northern Railroad	
New Orleans, Baton Rouge and Vicksburg Railroad		MP		1869	1881	New Orleans Pacific Railway	
New Orleans Belt Railroad		IC		1878	1886	Chicago, St. Louis and New Orleans Railroad	
New Orleans Belt and Terminal Company		SOU		1901	1903	New Orleans Terminal Company	
New Orleans, Fort Jackson and Grand Isle Railroad		MP		1888	1911	New Orleans Southern and Grand Isle Railway	
New Orleans Great Northern Railroad	NOGN	GM&O		1905	1933	New Orleans Great Northern Railway	
New Orleans Great Northern Railway		GM&O		1933	1983	Illinois Central Gulf Railroad	
New Orleans and Gulf Railroad		SOU		1886	1891	New Orleans and Southern Railroad	
New Orleans, Jackson and Great Northern Railroad		IC		1853	1874	New Orleans, St. Louis and Chicago Railroad	
New Orleans, Jackson and Northern Railroad		IC		1877	1878	Chicago, St. Louis and New Orleans Railroad	
New Orleans Lower Coast Railroad	NOLR			1991	1999	New Orleans and Gulf Coast Railway	
New Orleans and Lower Coast Railroad	NLC	MP		1916	1978	Missouri Pacific Railroad	
New Orleans and Mississippi Valley Railroad		IC		1881	1884	Louisville, New Orleans and Texas Railway	
New Orleans, Mobile and Chattanooga Railroad		L&N, MP, SP		1868	1871	New Orleans, Mobile and Texas Railroad	
New Orleans, Mobile and Chicago Railroad		GM&O		1912	1913	N/A	
New Orleans, Mobile and Texas Railroad		L&N, MP, SP		1871	1881	Louisiana Western Railroad, Louisville and Nashville Railroad, Morgan's Louisiana and Texas Railroad and Steamship Company	
New Orleans, Natalbany and Natchez Railway				1902	1938	N/A	
New Orleans, Natchez and Fort Scott Railway		MP		1886	1890	New Orleans and Northwestern Railway	
New Orleans and Northeastern Railroad	N&NE	SOU		1870	1969	Alabama Great Southern Railroad	
New Orleans and Northwestern Railroad		MP		1902	1909	St. Louis, Iron Mountain and Southern Railway	
New Orleans and Northwestern Railway		MP		1890	1902	New Orleans and Northwestern Railroad	
New Orleans, Opelousas and Great Western Railroad		SP		1852	1869	Morgan's Louisiana and Texas Railroad	
New Orleans Pacific Railway		MP		1876	1881	Texas and Pacific Railway	
New Orleans, St. Louis and Chicago Railroad		IC		1874	1877	New Orleans, Jackson and Northern Railroad	
New Orleans and San Francisco Railroad		SOU		1902	1903	New Orleans Terminal Company	
New Orleans and Southern Railroad		SOU		1891	1897	Louisiana Southern Railway	
New Orleans Southern Railway		MP		1908	1911	New Orleans Southern and Grand Isle Railway	
New Orleans Southern and Grand Isle Railway		MP		1911	1916	New Orleans and Lower Coast Railroad	
New Orleans, Spanish Fort and Lake Railroad							
New Orleans Terminal Company	NOT	SOU		1903	1993	Alabama Great Southern Railroad	
New Orleans, Texas and Mexico Railroad		MP		1910	1916	New Orleans, Texas and Mexico Railway	
New Orleans, Texas and Mexico Railway		MP		1916	1956	Missouri Pacific Railroad	
New Orleans and Western Railroad		SOU		1895	1901	New Orleans Belt and Terminal Company	
North Louisiana and Gulf Railroad	NL&G, NLG			1906	1987	MidLouisiana Rail Corporation	Subsidiary of the Huie-Hodge Lumber Company. Acquired smaller lines like Louisiana & North West in the 1940s. Acquired by Kansas City Southern but name still survives as a leased asset.
North Louisiana and Texas Railroad		IC		1868	1875	Vicksburg, Shreveport and Texas Railroad	
Oakdale and Gulf Railway	O&G		11.6	February 7, 1916	November 17, 1927	N/A	Leased tracks from Forest Lumber Company and the Bowman-Hicks Lumber Company. The capital stock was owned by the two companies. Oakdale to Oakdale Junction, Godwin, Boone, Caney, and Wards. Connections at Oakdale: Missouri Pacific Railroad and Gulf Colorado and Santa Fe Railway, at Wards: Missouri Pacific RR.
Oberlin, Hampton and Eastern Railway							
Old River and Kissatchie Railway							
Opelousas, Gulf and Northeastern Railway		MP		1904	1915	Texas and Pacific Railway	
Ouachita and Northwestern Railroad				1905	1947	N/A	
Pontchartrain Railroad		L&N		1830	1935	N/A	
Red River Railroad		MP		1835	1878	New Orleans Pacific Railway	
Red River and Gulf Railroad				1905	1954	N/A	
Red River and Rocky Mount Railway				1904		N/A	
Robeline and Sabine Pass Railway							
Rochelle and Western Railway							
Rock Island, Arkansas and Louisiana Railroad		RI		1905	1948	Chicago, Rock Island and Pacific Railroad	
Roosevelt and Western Railroad				1909		N/A	
Sabine and Northern Railway							
St. Bernard Railroad		SOU		1834		Mexican Gulf Railway	
St. Louis, Arkansas and Texas Railway		SSW		1887	1891	St. Louis Southwestern Railway	
St. Louis, Avoyelles and Southwestern Railroad		MP		1894	1895	St. Louis, Avoyelles and Southwestern Railway	
St. Louis, Avoyelles and Southwestern Railway		MP		1895	1899	Avoyelles Railroad	
St. Louis, Iron Mountain and Southern Railway		MP		1891	1917	Missouri Pacific Railroad	
St. Louis and San Francisco Railroad		SLSF		1905	1913	N/A	
St. Louis Southwestern Railway	SSW	SSW		1891	1997	Union Pacific Railroad	
St. Louis, Watkins and Gulf Railway		MP		1902	1909	St. Louis, Iron Mountain and Southern Railway	
Seaboard System Railroad	SBD			1983	1986	CSX Transportation	
Sherman, Shreveport and Southern Railway		MKT		1900	1901	Missouri, Kansas and Texas Railway of Texas	
Shreveport, Alexandria and Southwestern Railway							
Shreveport and Arkansas Railway		SSW		1887	1887	Arkansas and Southern Railway	
Shreveport and Houston Railway		SP		1883	1890	Houston and Shreveport Railroad	
Shreveport and Red River Valley Railway		KCS		1897	1903	Louisiana Railway and Navigation Company	
Sibley, Lake Bisteneau and Southern Railway				1900	1942	N/A	
South Central Arkansas Railway	SCK			1982	1983	East Camden and Highland Railroad	
Southeastern Railroad		SOU		1855	1882	Mississippi, Terre-aux-Boeuf and Lake Railroad	
Southern Railway and Navigation Company							
Southern Pacific Company	SP	SP		1961	1969	Southern Pacific Transportation Company	
Southern Pacific Company		SP		1885	1901	N/A	
Southern Pacific Railroad		MP		1862	1872	Texas Pacific Railroad	
Southern Pacific Transportation Company	SP	SP		1969	1998	Union Pacific Railroad	
Teche Railroad and Sugar Company							
Texarkana, Shreveport and Natchez Railway		MP		1895	1901	Texas and Pacific Railway	
Texas and New Orleans Railroad	T&NO, TNO	SP		1927	1961	Southern Pacific Company	
Texas Pacific Railroad		MP		1872	1872	Texas and Pacific Railway	
Texas and Pacific Railway	T&P, TP	MP		1872	1976	Missouri Pacific Railroad	
Texas Pacific – Missouri Pacific Terminal Railroad of New Orleans	TPMP	MP		1924	1978	Missouri Pacific Railroad	
Tioga and Southeastern Railway				1905		N/A	
Trans-Mississippi Terminal Company		MP		1912	1914	Trans-Mississippi Terminal Railroad	
Trans-Mississippi Terminal Railroad		MP		1914	1924	Texas Pacific – Missouri Pacific Terminal Railroad of New Orleans	
Tremont and Gulf Railroad		IC		1902	1908	Tremont and Gulf Railway	
Tremont and Gulf Railway	T&G	IC		1907	1959	Illinois Central Railroad	
Vicksburg, Shreveport and Pacific Railroad		IC		1879	1901	Vicksburg, Shreveport and Pacific Railway	
Vicksburg, Shreveport and Pacific Railway	VS&P	IC		1901	1959	Illinois Central Railroad	
Vicksburg, Shreveport and Texas Railroad		IC		1852	1879	Vicksburg, Shreveport and Pacific Railroad	
Victoria, Fisher and Western Railroad				1902		N/A	
Vidalia and Lake Concordia Railroad and Steamboat Transportation Company		MP		1876	1881	Vidalia and Western Railroad	
Vidalia and Western Railroad		MP		1881	1881	Natchez, Red River and Texas Railroad	
West Feliciana Railroad		IC		1831	1888	Louisville, New Orleans and Texas Railway	
West Feliciana Railway				1944	1948	N/A	
White Castle and Lake Natchez Railway							
Woodworth and Louisiana Central Railway				1900	1926	N/A	
Yazoo and Mississippi Valley Railroad		IC		1892	1946	Illinois Central Railroad	
Zachary and Northeastern Railroad							
Zimmerman, Leesville and Southwestern Railway							
Zwolle and Eastern Railway				1904	1922	N/A	

Special notes:

  1. Mileage not noted separately is retrieved from the Railroad Commission of Louisiana; Louisiana Railroad Mileage, 1920
  2. Other railroads and companies.
- New Orleans and Carrollton Railroad

== General references ==
- Association of American Railroads (2003), Railroad Service in Louisiana (PDF). Retrieved May 9, 2005.
- Hilton, George W. (1990). American Narrow Gauge Railroads. Stanford, California: Stanford University Press. ISBN 0-8047-2369-9.
- I.C.C. Tap Line Case Logging Railroad Summaries. Texas Transportation Archive. Retrieved May 20, 2007.
