= Alabama Great Southern Railroad =

Railroad in Southern United States

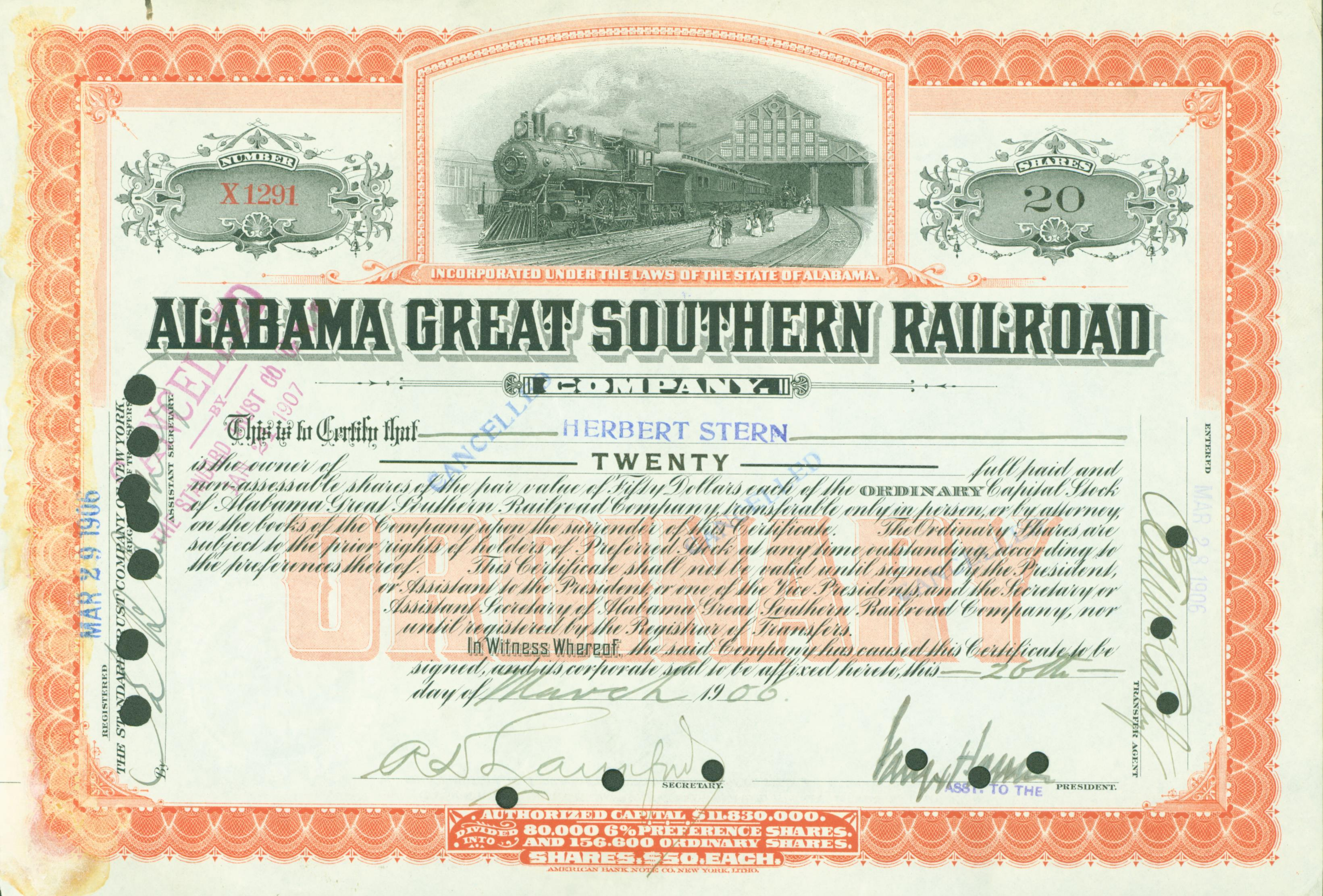

Overview
- Reporting mark: AGS
- Locale: Chattanooga, TN-Meridian, MS (New Orleans, LA from 1969)
- Dates of operation: 1877–present
- Successor: Southern Railway

Technical
- Track gauge: 4 ft 8 1/2 in (1,435 mm) standard gauge
- Previous gauge: originally built as 5 ft (1,524 mm) and converted to 4 ft 9 in (1,448 mm) in 1886.
- Length: 1,084 miles (1,745 km)

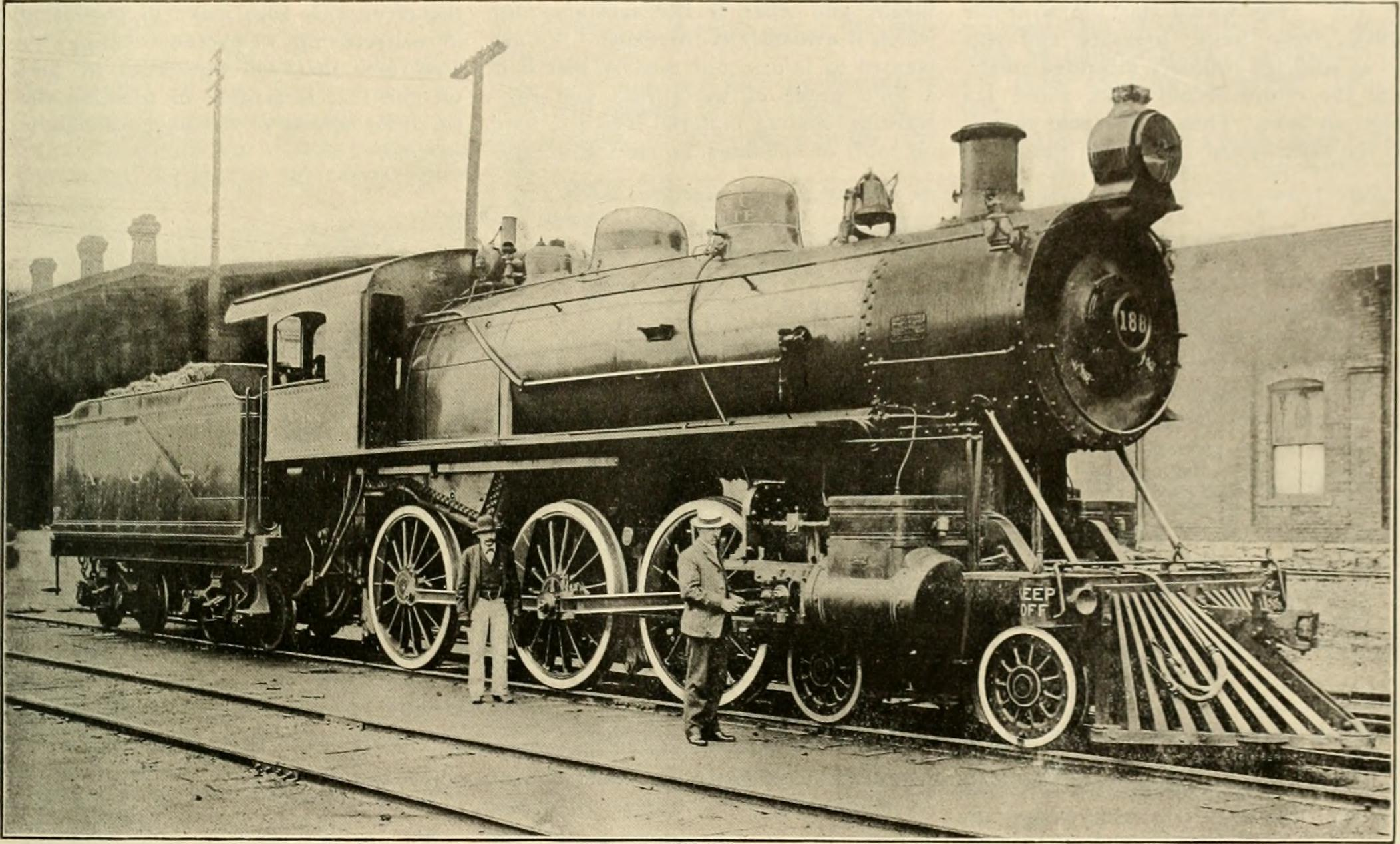
AGS locomotive from the August 1905 Railway and Locomotive Engineering magazine

The Alabama Great Southern Railroad (reporting mark AGS) is a railroad in the U.S. states of Alabama, Georgia, Louisiana, Mississippi, and Tennessee. It is an operating subsidiary of the Norfolk Southern Corporation (NS), running southwest from Chattanooga (where it connects with the similarly owned Cincinnati, New Orleans and Texas Pacific Railway) to New Orleans through Birmingham and Meridian. The AGS also owns about a 30% interest in the Canadian Pacific Kansas City-controlled Meridian-Shreveport Meridian Speedway.

In 1970 AGS reported 3854 million net ton-miles (5627 million net tonne-kilometers) of revenue freight and 105 million passenger miles (169 million passenger kilometers); at the end of that year it operated 528 miles (850 km) of road and 1,084 miles (1,745 km) of track. (Those totals do not include Class II subsidiary Louisiana Southern.)

== History ==
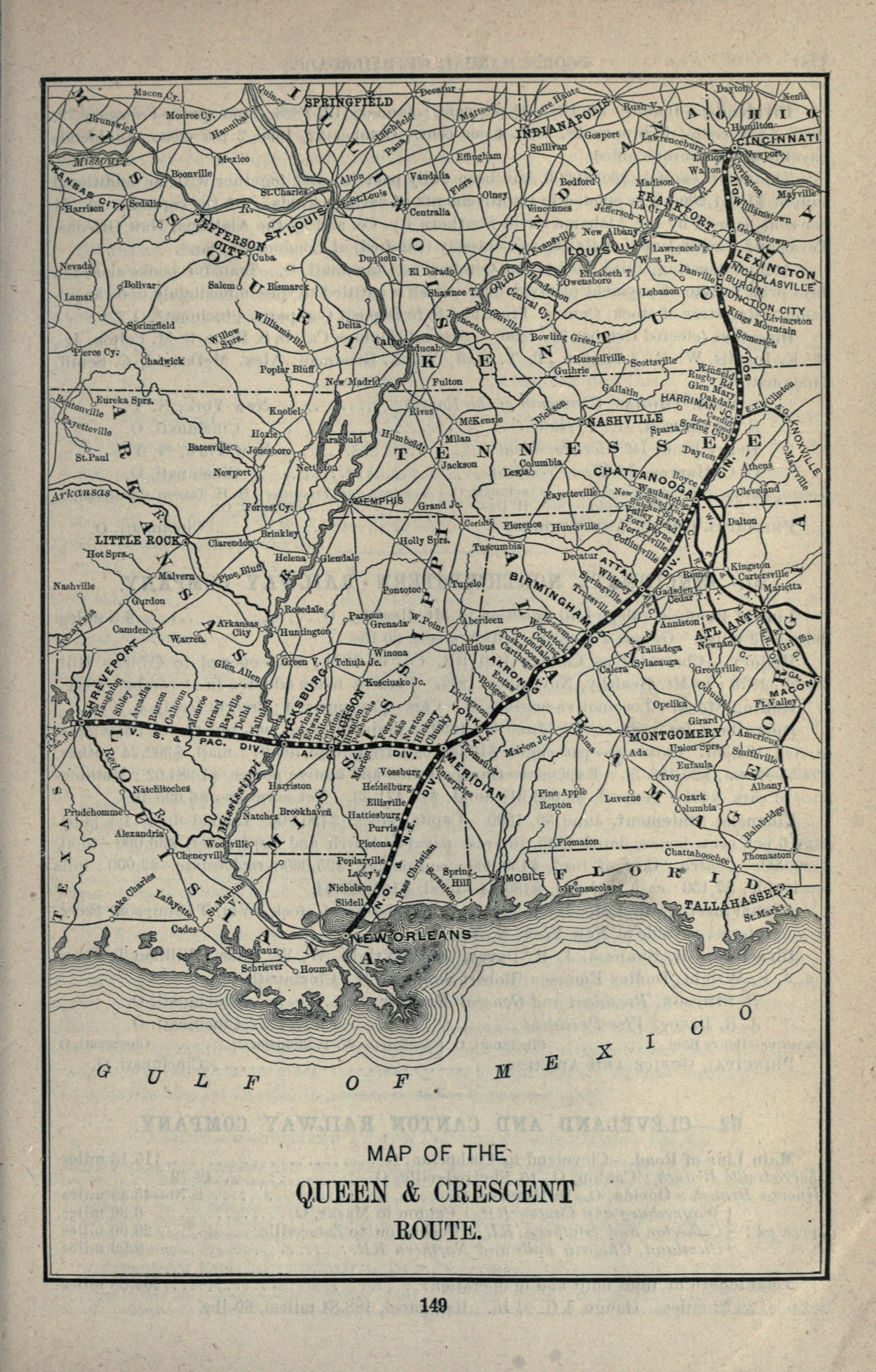
1891 map of the "Queen and Crescent Route" of AGS

=== Predecessor lines ===
==== Wills Valley Railroad ====
The AGS's oldest predecessor was the Wills Valley Railroad, chartered by the Alabama Legislature in February 1852 to extend from a point on the Alabama and Tennessee River Railroad northeast to the Georgia state line. In January and February 1854, respectively, the Georgia and Tennessee legislatures authorized the company to continue its road to a point on the Nashville and Chattanooga Railroad.

==== North East and South West Alabama Railroad ====
The North East and South West Alabama Railroad was chartered in Alabama in December 1853 and Mississippi in February 1854, to extend from Meridian through Livingston, Eutaw, Tuscaloosa, and Elyton (Birmingham) in the direction of Knoxville, Tennessee. Both companies received land grants through a June 1856 federal law, assigned by Alabama in January 1858 to the North East and South West from Mississippi to near Gadsden and to the Wills Valley from near Gadsden to Georgia.

The two companies began construction from their termini outside Alabama. The Wills Valley opened the line from the Nashville and Chattanooga at Wauhatchie, Tennessee to Trenton, Georgia by December 1860, operating to Chattanooga via trackage rights over the Nashville and Chattanooga. The North East and South West began its line at Meridian, reaching a connection with the Alabama and Mississippi Rivers Railroad (later the Selma and Meridian Railroad) at York, Alabama by 1860, and was leased to the latter company.

==== Alabama and Chattanooga Railroad ====
A group of Boston capitalists headed by John C. Stanton gained control of the companies after the Civil War, and the Alabama legislature passed a law November 18, 1868 to merge the two as the Alabama and Chattanooga Railroad. (Georgia, Tennessee, and Mississippi renamed their portions in March 1869, February 1870, and May 1871, respectively.) The entire line was completed in May 1871, creating a diagonal link across Alabama. However, due to nonpayment of interest on state bonds, the state of Alabama seized the property in mid-1871, and it was operated by other parties (including the president of the connecting New Orleans and Northeastern Railroad) until November 1877, when it was reorganized as the Alabama Great Southern Railroad by Emile Erlanger and Company.

=== Acquisitions ===
Erlanger set up an English corporation, Alabama Great Southern Railway Company, Limited, to own the stock of the AGS. In 1881, this company gained control of the Cincinnati, New Orleans and Texas Pacific Railway, which continued north from Chattanooga to Cincinnati. A second English corporation, Alabama, New Orleans, Texas and Pacific Junction Railways Company, Limited, was created in 1881 to increase the funds available to purchase associated lines. It bought the Alabama Great Southern Railway Company, New Orleans and Northeastern Railroad, Vicksburg and Meridian Railway, and Vicksburg, Shreveport and Pacific Railroad, but in 1890 control of the AGS was sold to the East Tennessee, Virginia and Georgia Railway and Richmond and Danville Railroad, which both became part of the Southern Railway later that decade. In April 1892, the AGS acquired the Gadsden and Attalla Railroad, a branch from Attalla to Gadsden, but in 1905 the AGS sold it to the Southern, retaining trackage rights. The AGS bought a half interest in the Woodstock and Blocton Railway from the Louisville and Nashville Railroad in July 1909, giving it access to West Blocton.

The AGS incorporated the Wauhatchie Extension Railway in April 1914 to continue the line from Wauhatchie to a junction with the Southern subsidiary Memphis-Chattanooga Railway west of Lookout Mountain. The property became part of the AGS in February 1917 and was completed later that year, giving the AGS a new route into Chattanooga, via the extension, trackage rights over the Memphis-Chattanooga, and a lease of the Belt Railway of Chattanooga.

By the summer of 1954, the AGS retired all of their steam locomotives. In January 1969, at the same time as the Southern gained total control over the AGS, it merged the New Orleans and Northeastern Railroad into the AGS. The AGS absorbed the Chattanooga Terminal Railway, Louisiana Southern Railway, and New Orleans Terminal Company in August 1993.

== Passenger trains ==
Southern Railway trains ran over the territory of the AGS. The Queen and Crescent ran on its territory until its termination in 1949. The Birmingham Special ran on the AGS' Chattanooga to Birmingham segment until its discontinuance in 1970. The Pelican also ran on its entire length, lasting to 1970. The Southerner ran on its territory southwest of Birmingham until its termination in 1970. Today, Amtrak's Crescent operates on its territory southwest of Birmingham.
