= EDW =

EDW may refer to:

== Transport ==
- El Dorado and Wesson Railway, a railway in Arkansas, U.S.
- East Dulwich railway station, London, England
- Edelweiss Air, a Swiss airline (ICAO:EDW)
- Edwards Air Force Base, California, U.S., (IATA:EDW)

== Other uses ==
- Eendracht Doet Winnen, a Dutch football club
- Elect Democratic Women, an American political action committee
- Enterprise data warehouse, in business
- European DataWarehouse
