= ANW =

ANW may refer to:

== Arts and entertainment ==
- American Ninja Warrior, an American game show since 2009
- Australian Ninja Warrior, an Australian game show; 2017–2022
- Harpoon 3: Advanced Naval Warfare, a 2006 Harpoon video game

== Transport ==
- Argentine North Western Railway, a British-owned company; 1886–1899
- Ainsworth Regional Airport, Nebraska, US (opened 1942; IATA: ANW)
- Allentown, an Amtrak Station in Pennsylvania, US (Amtrak:ANW)
- Aviación Del Noroeste, a defunct Mexican airline; see List of airline codes (A) (IATA:ANW)

== Other uses ==
- Aegean Marine Petroleum Network Inc., formed 1995 (NYSE ticker:ANW)
- Algemeen Nederlands Woordenboek (ANW), an online dictionary of Dutch
- Anaang language, spoken in Nigeria (ISO 639:anw)

== See also ==
- ANWS, American angling non-profit; formed 1960
- A&W (disambiguation)
- ANVV De Zwaluwen, a Dutch football team; 1907–1930
