= LLD (disambiguation) =

LLD usually refers to Legum Doctor (LL.D.), a doctorate-level academic degree in law. LLD may also refer to:

- Ladin language, ISO 639-3 code lld
- Leg length discrepancy
- lld, the subproject of the LLVM compiler infrastructure project
- Loan Level Data, collected by the ABS Loan Level Initiative
- Low-level design of software components
