= Queen and Crescent Route =

Former American railroad network

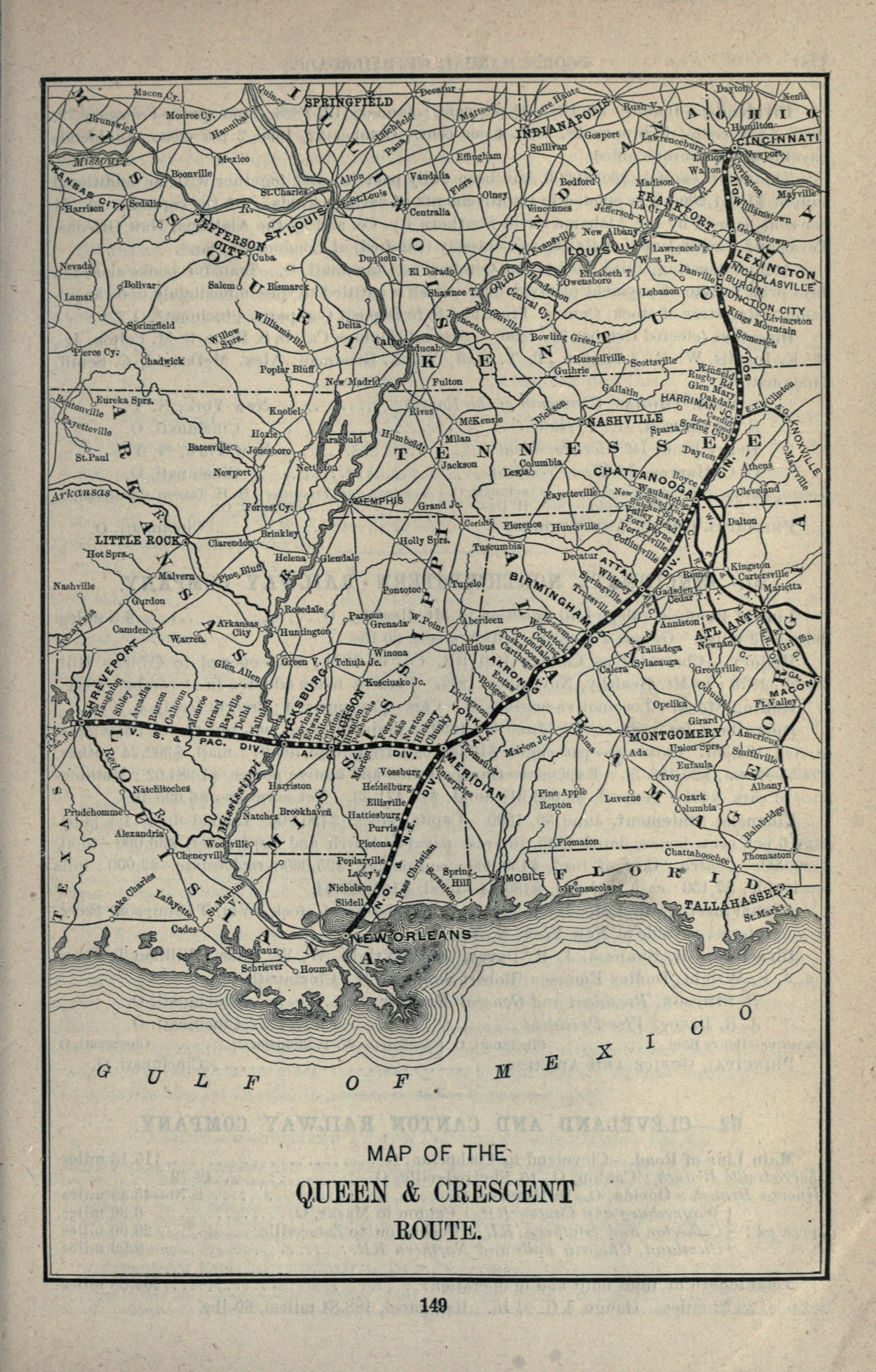
1891 map

The Queen and Crescent Route was a cooperative railroad route in the Southeastern U.S., connecting Cincinnati (the "Queen City") with New Orleans (the "Crescent City") and Shreveport. Inaugurated in the 1880s, the name was retained by Southern Railway when they consolidated ownership of the entire route in 1926, and given to their named passenger train for the route through 1949.

== Layout ==
As of 1909, the line consisted of five segments:

- Cincinnati, New Orleans and Texas Pacific Railway, 337 miles of line between Cincinnati and Chattanooga (controlled by the Alabama Great Southern Railroad operating company and two other companies)
- the Alabama Great Southern Railroad between Chattanooga and Meridian, Mississippi
- the New Orleans and Northeastern Railroad, 196 miles of line between Meridian and New Orleans, Louisiana (controlled by Emile Erlanger's English holding company Alabama, New Orleans, Texas and Pacific Junction Railways Company)
- the Alabama & Vicksburg Railway, 143 miles of line from Meridian westward to Vicksburg (also controlled by Erlanger)
- and the Vicksburg, Shreveport and Pacific Railway, west from Vicksburg to Shreveport, Louisiana (controlled by Erlanger)

== History ==
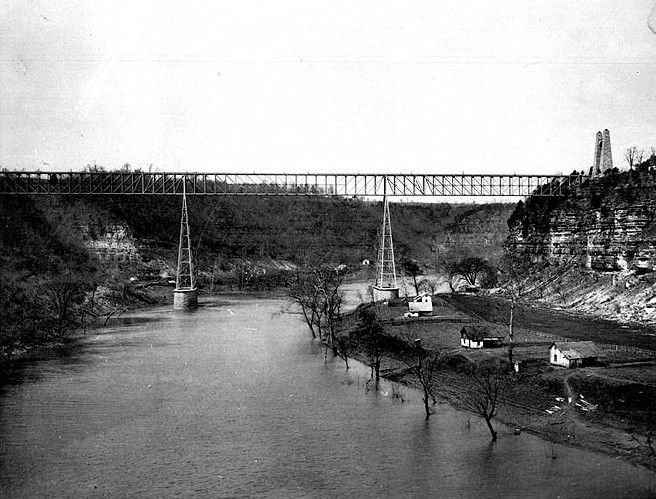
The route included the High Bridge of Kentucky

Investor Emile Erlanger & Co. gained control of the newly constructed New Orleans and Northeastern Railroad in 1881. Vintage marketing advertises the Queen & Crescent Route as "Established Nov. 18, 1883", which refers to the date of first scheduled passenger service on the NO&NE. Erlanger then expanded the lines under his control to encompass the entire route, held through a complex corporate structure of two English corporations.

In 1895 the Q&C route, along with the entire Erlanger consortium, was acquired by Southern Railway, one relatively small merger in the vast consolidation engineered by Samuel Spencer.

Eventually the main line to New Orleans was retained by the Southern Railway, and is still part of the Norfolk Southern Railway system, while the Illinois Central Railroad acquired the two segments west of Meridian to Shreveport through its subsidiary Yazoo and Mississippi Valley Railroad. This line was later sold to MidSouth Rail Corporation, which was acquired Kansas City Southern in 1993. In 2005, KCS formed a joint venture with Norfolk Southern to create the Meridian Speedway, an upgraded freight route between Meridian and Shreveport.

== Queen and Crescent Limited ==
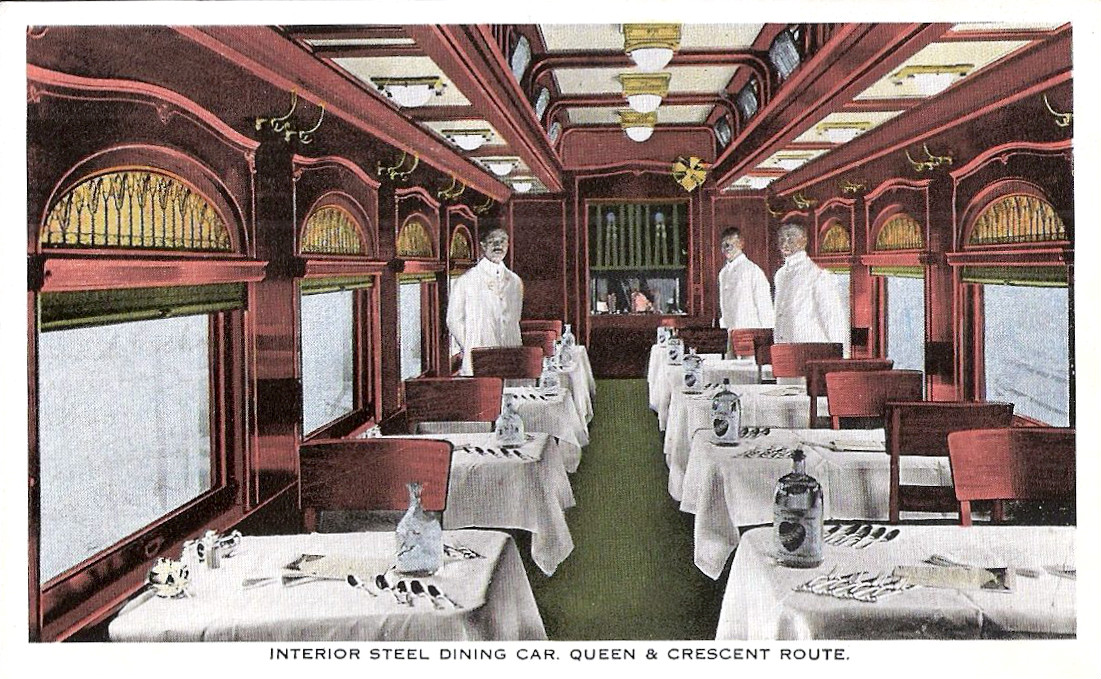
dining car, postcard, date unknown

Southern Railway inaugurated a named passenger train for the route, the Queen and Crescent Limited, in 1926. Never a financial success, the train carried both coaches and Pullman sleepers and a dining car. The train was discontinued in 1949.
