= Greenwood, Anderson and Western Railway =

The Greenwood, Anderson and Western Railway was a South Carolina railroad established in the late 19th century.

The Greenwood, Anderson and Western was chartered by the South Carolina General Assembly in 1895. Its initial stretch, from Sievern, South Carolina, to Alethea, South Carolina, opened the following year. The route was leased to the Carolina Midland Railway.

The Greenwood, Anderson and Western was placed in receivership in January 1897 and sold later that year, with property being conveyed to a new company called the Sievern and Knoxville Railroad in April 1898.

The line was controlled by the Southern Railway after 1899 and was abandoned in 1933.
