= Cincinnati, New Orleans and Texas Pacific Railway =

American railroad

Overview
- Headquarters: Cincinnati, Ohio
- Reporting mark: CNTP
- Locale: Ohio, Kentucky, Tennessee
- Dates of operation: 1881–present

Technical
- Track gauge: 4 ft 8 1/2 in (1,435 mm) standard gauge
- Previous gauge: originally 5 ft (1,524 mm), converted to 4 ft 9 in (1,448 mm) in 1886
- Length: 337 miles (542 km)
- No. of tracks: 1–2
- Operating speed: 20–60 mph (32–97 km/h)

The Cincinnati, New Orleans and Texas Pacific Railway (abbreviated: CNO&TP; (reporting mark CNTP)) is a railroad that owns the Cincinnati Southern Railway from Cincinnati, Ohio, south to Chattanooga, Tennessee, and leases it to the Norfolk Southern Railway system.

The physical assets of the road were initially financed by the city of Cincinnati in the 1870s, and until March 2024 had been owned by the city. It had been the only such long-distance railway owned by a municipality in the United States. The CNO&TP now owns that property and operates one rail line, the Cincinnati Southern Railway, between Cincinnati and Chattanooga.

== History ==
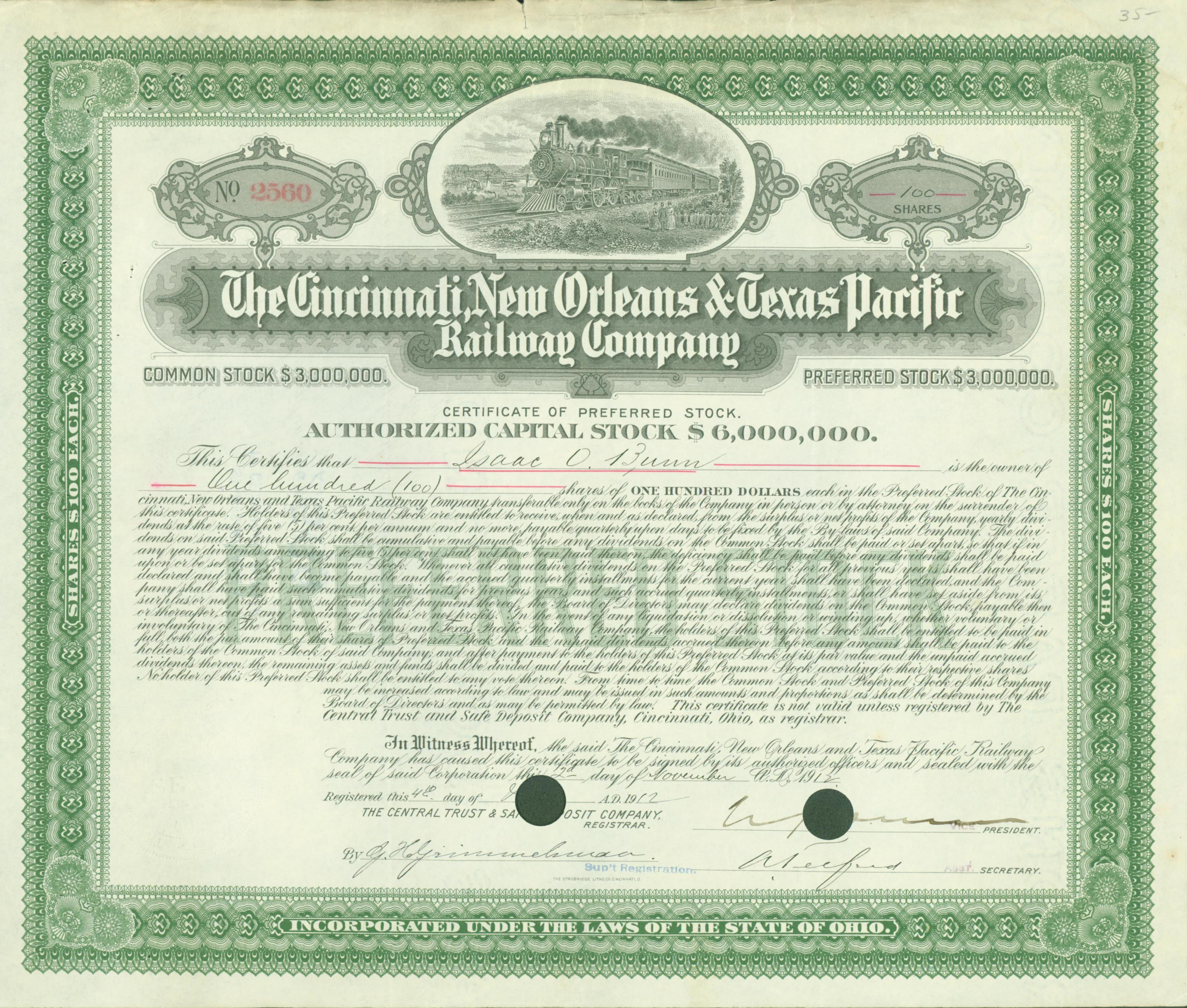
Preferred share of the Cincinnati, New Orleans and Texas Pacific Railway Company, issued 2 November 1912

The line opened completely in 1880, and was financed by the city of Cincinnati. Construction was spurred by a shift of Ohio River shipping, important to the local economy. Fearing the loss of shipping traffic and the local salaries and tax revenue that came with it, the city recognized the need to remain competitive. The Ohio Constitution forbade cities from forming partnerships in stock corporations, so the city, led by Edward A. Ferguson, took upon itself the building of the railway.

With wide popular approval, city voters voted for $10 million in municipal bonds in 1869 to begin construction. With 337 miles of track and many tunnels to construct, another bond for an additional $6 million was necessary. Some portions were open by 1877, and the entire line opened February 21, 1880. The last spike was placed on December 10, 1879. It opened for passenger service on March 8, 1880.

=== Routing ===
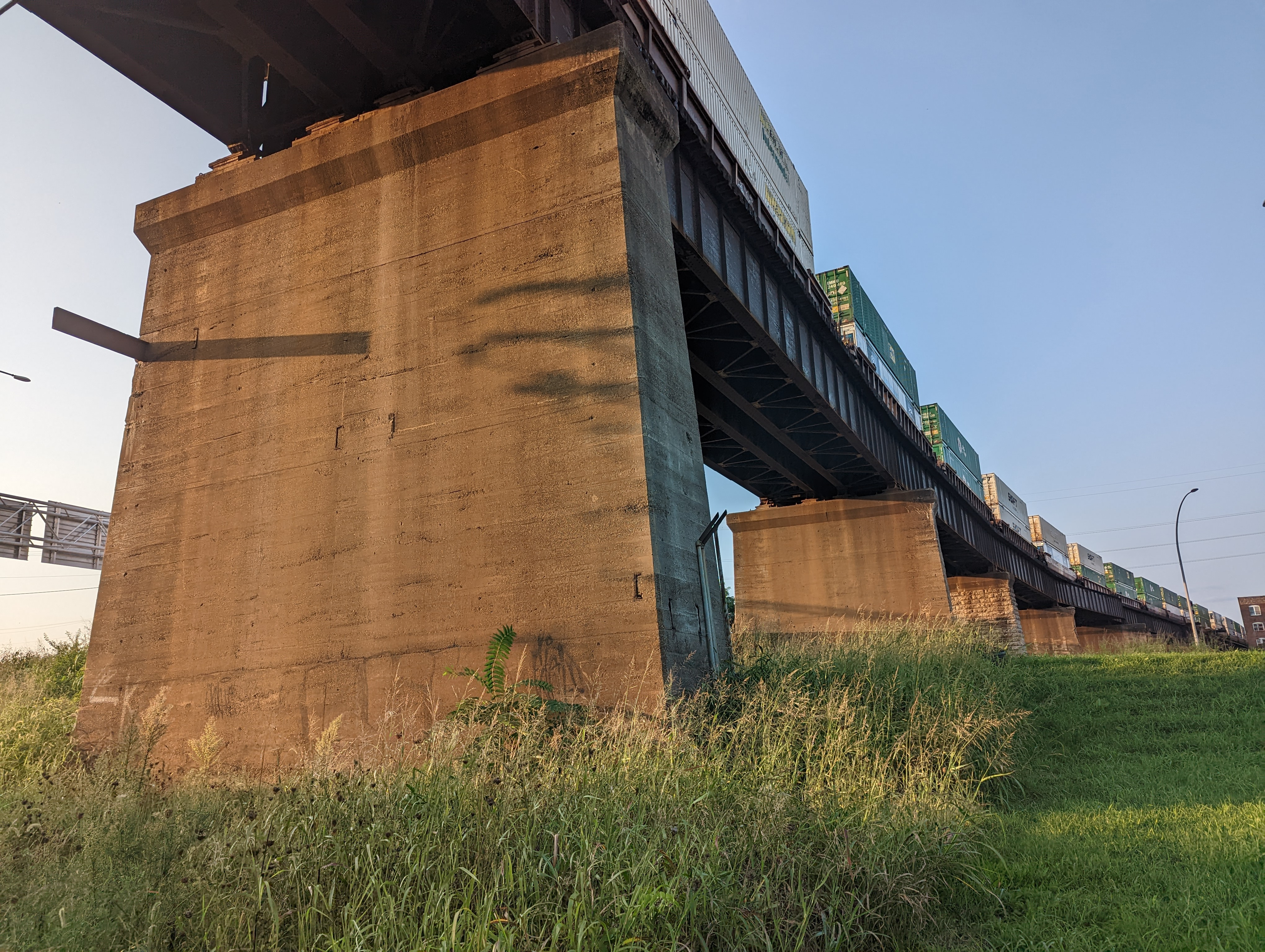
The Cincinnati Southern Railway heading southward through Queensgate.

The CNO&TP main line has three districts: the First District from Cincinnati, Ohio, to Danville, Kentucky; the Second District from Danville to Oakdale, Tennessee; and the Third District from Oakdale to Chattanooga.

The Second District is known as the "Rathole" due to steep grades, 27 tunnels, and numerous curves which were once this line's signature. While several projects over the span of 60 years eliminated several problem areas, the Southern Railway's line improvement project between 1959 and 1963 is the best known. This project saw numerous cuts and line relocations to bypass tunnels and reduce the steep grades and tight curves. Only Tunnels #22 and #24 at Nemo, Tennessee and Tunnels #25 and #26 at Oakdale remain on the line; all but #25 were built new in the 1960s.

Originally built to 5 ft (1,524 mm) broad gauge, the line was converted to standard gauge, 4 ft 8 1/2 in (1,435 mm), in 13 hours in 1886.

The late 1990s saw another improvement with the Norfolk Southern Railway double tracking the segment south of Somerset, Kentucky, between Tateville and KD Tower (near Greenwood, Kentucky). As of 2013, a massive project is underway to double track from Woods, also known as Somerset, to Grove just north of Burnside. This project will straighten a curve near the Kentucky Route 914 bypass overpass, allowing improved train handling. NS planners and engineering officials are still considering improving the company's second most profitable line, including the initial $65 million in line improvement projects from 1959 to 1963 and 1996 to 2010. Norfolk Southern is projected to have spent over $1 billion in a span of 60 years.

=== Queen and Crescent Route ===
After two years of leasing the property to local companies, in 1881 the city entered a 25-year lease to an entity called Cincinnati, New Orleans and Texas Pacific Railway, which was held by an English corporation controlled by German-born Parisian banker Frédéric Émile d'Erlanger. Soon Erlanger held all five segments of railroad from Cincinnati to New Orleans, and west from Meridian, Mississippi to Shreveport, Louisiana. This was dubbed the Queen and Crescent Route, connecting the Queen City to the Crescent City.

Erlanger sold his interest in 1890. In 1894 the CNO&TP was one of many properties reorganized by Samuel Spencer into the vastly expanded Southern Railway.

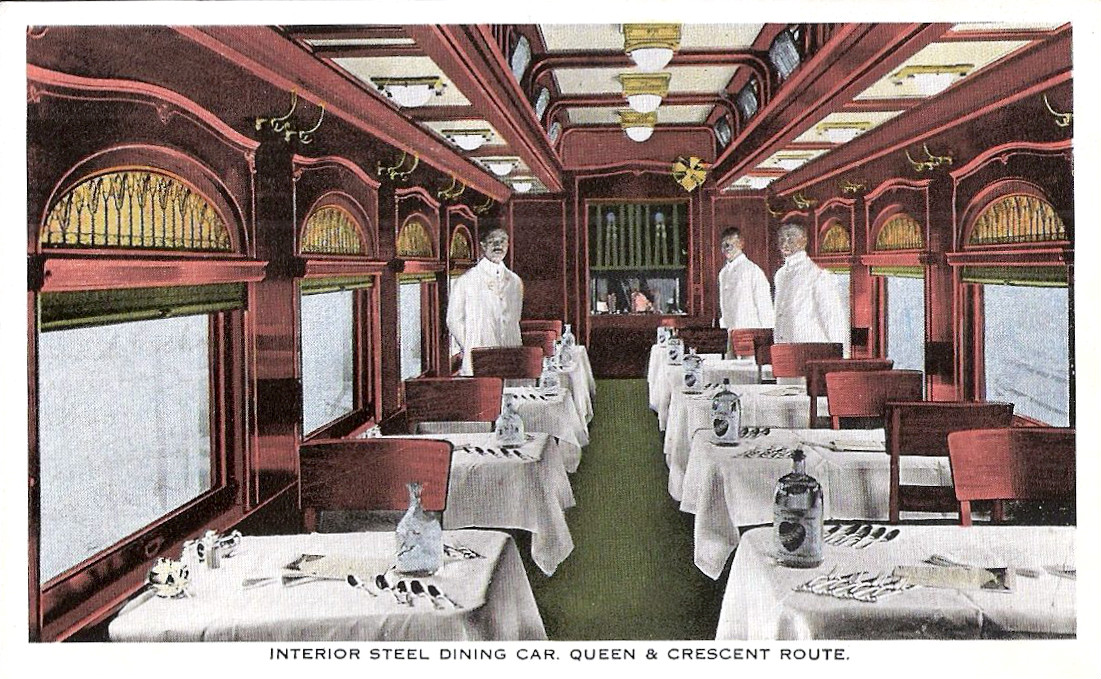
dining car, postcard, date unknown

The railroad inaugurated a named passenger train for the route, the Queen and Crescent Limited, in 1926. Never a financial success, the train carried both coaches and Pullman sleepers and a dining car. The train was discontinued in 1949.

=== 1911 strike ===
White firemen of the CNO&TP struck on January 9, 1911, when the company refused their demand that their black counterparts be fired within 90 days. Trains continued to run, with black firemen on their crews, in the vicinity of Kings Mountain, Kentucky, Somerset, Kentucky, and Oakdale, Tennessee, in terrain well-suited for sniper attacks. Within four days, sharpshooters killed at least eleven people: nine black railroad employees and two detectives.

== Cincinnati Southern Railway ==
The present-day Cincinnati Southern Railway runs 337 miles (542 km) from Cincinnati to Chattanooga. It is still owned by the City of Cincinnati and is leased to the CNO&TP under a long-term lease; it is the only such long-distance railway owned by a municipality in the United States. The CNO&TP's lease of the Cincinnati Southern Railway is currently set to expire in 2026, with an option for a 25-year renewal.

The agreement is governed by the five-member Trustees of the Cincinnati Southern Railway, who are appointed by the Mayor of the City of Cincinnati.

The Cincinnati, New Orleans and Texas Pacific is operated by Norfolk Southern as part of the Alabama Division. Between Cincinnati and Somerset the line is under control of the North End Dispatcher, Knoxville, Tennessee. Somerset to Hixson, Tennessee, is dispatched by the South End Dispatcher, Knoxville. The CT (Chattanooga Terminal) Dispatcher controls the last few miles and a few surrounding lines into Chattanooga.

More than 50 trains a day can be seen on the CNO&TP, with the heaviest concentration between Danville and Harriman, Tennessee. Quite a bit of the traffic is intermodal and automotive. General manifests, local freights, grain, coal, and other bulk commodities make up the rest of the traffic.

In 1925 CNO&TP reported 1688 million ton-miles of revenue freight (not including Harriman & Northeastern) on 338 route-miles operated; in 1967 it had 4116 million ton-miles on 337 route-miles. Revenue passenger-miles were 134 million in 1925 and 15 million in 1967.

In 2023 it was announced that Norfolk Southern had reached an agreement to buy the Cincinnati Southern for $1.6 billion, subject to approval by voters in Cincinnati, the Surface Transportation Board and the Ohio General Assembly. The Surface Transportation board has since given its approval. In November 2023, Cincinnati voters approved the deal to sell Cincinnati Southern. The Norfolk Southern closed on the acquisition in March 2024.

== See also ==
- Queen and Crescent Route
- Interstate Commerce Commission v. Cincinnati, New Orleans and Texas Pacific Railway Co.
- Cincinnati–Blue Ash Airport, formerly owned by the City of Cincinnati outside the corporation limits
- French Park (Amberley, Ohio), also owned by the City of Cincinnati outside the corporation limits
