= A&W =

A&W may refer to:

== Food and beverage ==
- A&W Root Beer, first introduced in the US in 1919
- A&W Restaurants, an American fast food chain
- A&W (Canada), a fast food chain originally a part of A&W Restaurants, later sold and operated as a separate company

== Music ==
- "A&W" (song), a song by American singer Lana Del Rey

== Railways ==
- Ahnapee and Western Railway, Wisconsin, United States
- Alexandria & Western Railway, Louisiana, United States
