= Sievern and Knoxville Railroad =

Defunct South Carolina railroad

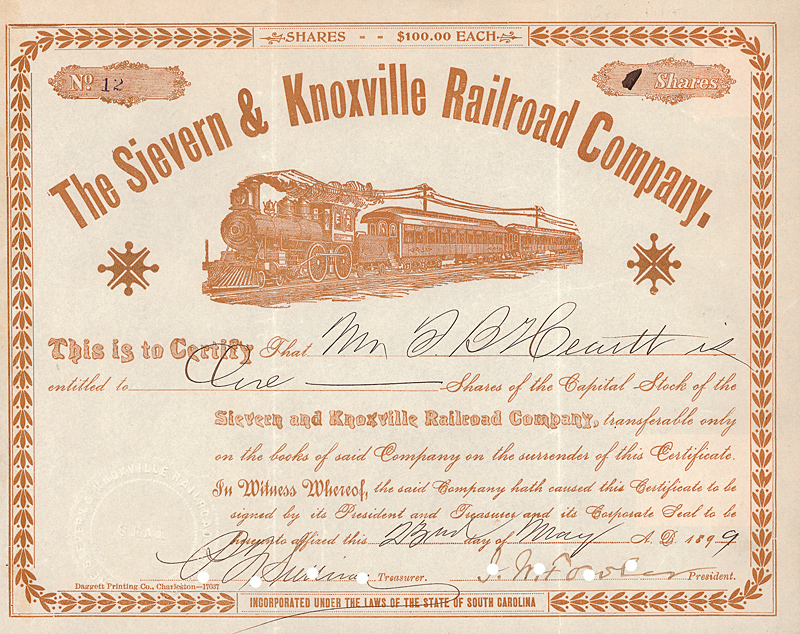
share of the Sievern & Knoxville Railroad Company from the 19. June 1901

The Sievern and Knoxville Railroad was a South Carolina railroad that operated from the late 19th century into the first half of the 20th century.

The Sievern and Knoxville was incorporated by the South Carolina General Assembly in 1898 as a successor to the Greenwood, Anderson and Western Railway. The latter was placed into receivership in January 1897. The Greenwood, Anderson and Western was sold in December 1897 with the property being conveyed to the Sievern and Knoxville in April 1898.

The line ran from Batesburg, South Carolina, to Sievern, South Carolina, about 17.5 miles.

It was controlled by the Southern Railway after 1899 and was abandoned in 1933.
