= Meridian Speedway =

Railroad in the United States

Overview
- Parent company: Canadian Pacific Kansas City (70%); Norfolk Southern Railway (30%)
- Locale: Louisiana / Mississippi
- Dates of operation: 2005–present
- Predecessors: Vicksburg Route

Technical
- Track gauge: 4 ft 8 1/2 in (1,435 mm) standard gauge
- Length: 320 mi (510 km)

The Meridian Speedway is a 320-mile (510 km) span of railroad track between Shreveport, Louisiana and Meridian, Mississippi. An important rail link between the Southeastern and Southwestern United States, it is operated as a joint venture of Canadian Pacific Kansas City (CPKC), which owns 70% of the partnership; and Alabama Great Southern Railroad, a subsidiary of Norfolk Southern Railway (NS).

== History ==
The Speedway was originally two railroads: the Alabama and Vicksburg Railway built the section from Meridian to Vicksburg, while the Vicksburg, Shreveport and Pacific Railway built the section from Vicksburg to Shreveport. Together they were known as the "Vicksburg Route."

These railroads, as well as others forming a line from New Orleans, Louisiana, through Meridian to Cincinnati, Ohio, were joined in 1881 to form the Queen and Crescent Route.

In 1926, the Vicksburg Route was leased by the Illinois Central Railroad. In 1986, Illinois Central divested itself of the line which was purchased by the MidSouth Rail Corporation. In 1993, KCS acquired the line as part of its purchase of MidSouth.

On December 2, 2005, KCS and NS announced their agreement to form a joint venture to operate the line. KCS contributed the rail line, while NS provided $300 million in cash, almost all of which was slated for capital improvements to increase capacity and improve transit times. The Surface Transportation Board (STB) completed its regulatory review on April 10, 2006, and cleared KCS and NS to close the deal on May 1.

By September 2007, about $135 million had been spent on the improvements. Several new and longer passing sidings were installed along with a new CTC signaling system. The mainline was effectively rebuilt from the ground up with new ballast, crossties and heavier welded rail. The improvements enable up to 45 trains per day to traverse the line.

In 2022, a proposal was made for passenger service on this line from Dallas to Meridian.

On June 28, 2023, CPKC announced the intent to jointly acquire with CSX Transportation the Meridian and Bigbee Railroad (MNBR). The MNBR creates a connection between Meridian and CSX in Montgomery, Alabama. The connection through the MNBR line will allow CSX traffic to or from Mexico to be delivered directly to CPKC, eliminating the need for a third railroad to move such traffic.

Currently under study is the possibility of Amtrak passenger service running over the Meridian Speedway to Fort Worth. If realized, the Crescent train (e.g., train #19 southbound) upon arrival at Meridian would split into two sections: one continuing on to New Orleans and the other departing westward for Fort Worth. In March 2023, Amtrak announced that it is seeking federal funding to once again study this proposal. Owing to KCS's continued opposition to hosting the train over the Speedway, continuation of the study depended on whether the Surface Transportation Board approved the merger of KCS with Canadian Pacific Railway. Approval came on March 15, 2023, becoming effective the following month, on 14th April, allowing work on the proposal to resume.
