= Ouachita Railroad =

Overview
- Headquarters: El Dorado, Arkansas
- Reporting mark: OUCH
- Locale: Arkansas, Louisiana
- Dates of operation: 1982–

Technical
- Track gauge: 4 ft 8 1/2 in (1,435 mm) standard gauge

The Ouachita Railroad Company (reporting mark OUCH) is a short-line railroad headquartered in El Dorado, Arkansas, United States.

OUCH operates a 26.2 mile line in Arkansas and Louisiana from El Dorado (where it interchanges with Union Pacific) to Lillie, Louisiana. Only the part from El Dorado to a plant south of town is in service.

OUCH traffic generally consists of lumber, chemicals, and particleboard.

The line was formerly part of the Chicago, Rock Island and Pacific Railroad until its liquidation. The line was then operated by the South Central Arkansas Railway from 1982 to 1983, when it was sold to the East Camden and Highland Railroad (EACH). EACH sold the line to Arkansas Shortline Railroads, Inc., a short-line railroad holding company, in 1990.
