= El Dorado and Wesson Railway =

Railway in Arkansas

Overview
- Headquarters: El Dorado, Arkansas
- Reporting mark: EDW
- Locale: Arkansas
- Dates of operation: 1905–present

Technical
- Track gauge: 4 ft 8 1/2 in (1,435 mm) standard gauge

The El Dorado & Wesson Railway is a shortline rail carrier in the state of Arkansas, Its line runs 5.5 miles from El Dorado, Arkansas to Newell, Arkansas.

== History ==
The backstory of the line begins with the opening of a small lumber mill in Wesson, Arkansas in 1904. The Arkansas Southern Railroad built a five mile spur to the mill, which the railroad continued to own but which was operated by the mill. However, as the mill expanded, its owners decided to make a change, and on September 17, 1905 incorporated the El Dorado & Wesson Railway. That railroad built 10.2 miles of track from Wesson to El Dorado in October 1907, allowing the mill to bypass the Arkansas Southern trackage and interconnect with another railroad directly.

For a time, the line also carried passengers, but that ended about 1953. In January, 1959, trackage was abandoned between Wesson and Oak Hill, Arkansas, about 6.9 miles. However, about 2 miles of that line was reopened from Oak Hill to Newell in 1961. Thus the line as currently configured has about 5.5 miles of track from El Dorado to Newell.

== Operations ==
Traffic on the line is petroleum products, chemicals, and medium density fiberboard.

The line interconnects with the Union Pacific at El Dorado.

The company employs 11 people.
