= New Orleans and Northeastern Railroad =

Transport company in United States of America

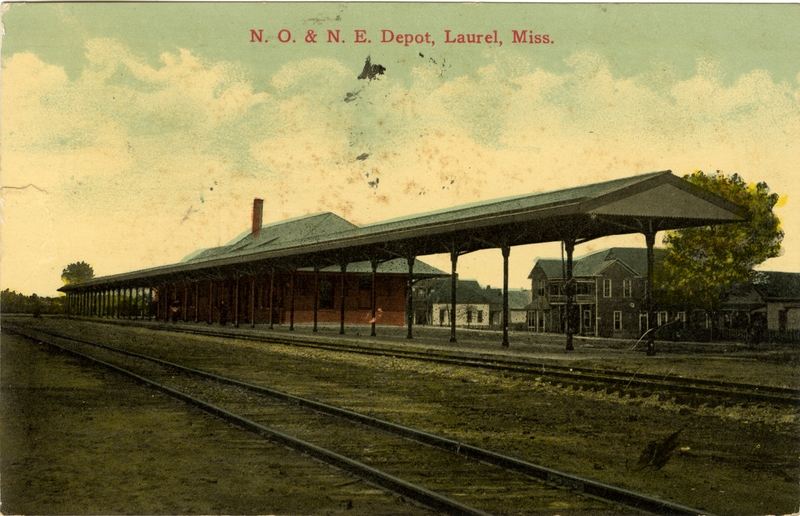
New Orleans and Northeastern Railroad Depot in Laurel, Mississippi, in the early 1900s

The New Orleans and Northeastern Railroad (reporting mark NONE) was a Class I railroad in Louisiana and Mississippi in the United States. The railroad operated 196 miles (315 km) of road from its completion in 1883 until it was absorbed by the Alabama Great Southern Railroad subsidiary of the Southern Railway in 1969.

== History ==
The New Orleans and Northeastern Railroad was incorporated in 1868 in Louisiana (under the name of Mandeville and Sulphur Springs Railroad until 1870) and in 1871 in Mississippi. No track was built, however, and the company's land lay unused until 1881, when control of the company was acquired by the Alabama, New Orleans, Texas and Pacific Junction Railways Company. Construction on the line began in 1882. The line opened in 1883 and extended 196 miles from New Orleans to Meridian, Mississippi.

In 1916 the Southern Railway acquired the NO&NE, which had been marketed as a portion of the Queen and Crescent Route since the 1880s. From that point on the NO&NE owned or were assigned locomotives and other equipment with Southern lettering, but they carried NO&NE sublettering until the line was merged into the Alabama Great Southern in the late-60s, at which time sublettering was changed to AGS.

In 1960, NO&NE reported 746 million net ton-miles of revenue freight and 13 million passenger-miles; at the end of that year it operated 203 miles of road and 368 miles of track.

In 1969, as part of an effort to simplify its corporate structure, the Southern Railway's Alabama Great Southern Railroad operating subsidiary merged with the NO&NE, ending its existence on paper.

== Today ==
The line remains in operation today. After a merger, the Southern Railway changed its name to the Norfolk Southern Railway in 1990.
