= Arkansas Southern Railroad (1892–1905) =

Small railroad in Arkansas and Louisiana, USA

Overview
- Headquarters: El Dorado, Arkansas
- Locale: Arkansas and Louisiana
- Dates of operation: 1892–1905
- Successor: Rock Island, Arkansas and Louisiana Railroad (later part of the Chicago, Rock Island and Pacific Railroad)

Technical
- Track gauge: 4 ft 8 1/2 in (1,435 mm)
- Length: 98 mi (158 km)

The Arkansas Southern Railroad Company was a small carrier with track in Arkansas and Louisiana. It was incorporated in 1892 and merged out of existence in 1905.

== History ==
The line was incorporated on August 29, 1892, in Arkansas. A mention in an 1898 newspaper says the line extended from El Dorado to Junction City, while making active efforts to extend through to the Gulf of Mexico. Meanwhile, another railroad, the Alexandria, Junction City & Shreveport Railway Company, had been organized and chartered on June 29, 1897, under the laws of Louisiana for the purpose of building a railroad from Junction City, via Ruston, to the town of Winnfield, Louisiana. That company was merged into the Arkansas Southern in March 1899, with the combined entity continuing as the Arkansas Southern Railroad Company. Stock certificates from 1900 say the line was incorporated in both Arkansas and Louisiana.

The railroad completed the mainline from El Dorado into Winnfield around April 1901. As shown in a mid-1901 listing in the Official Railway Guide, the line ran south from El Dorado through small settlements in Union County, Arkansas, like Cargile, Upland and Cornie before encountering Junction City on the Arkansas/Louisiana border. It continued into Union Parish, Louisiana, going through Lille and Bernice. In Lincoln Parish, the line went through Dubach and Vienna into the junction at Ruston. It continued south into Winn Parrish and towns like Dodson and Tannehill before terminating in Winnfield. The listing indicates an intent to complete the line to the Gulf Coast, and specifically to a location marked as New Sabine City, also referred to as just Sabine City, immediately to the west of Port Arthur in Texas. But, a description of the railroad on its end-of-service date does not indicate the line reached any destination south of Winnfield.

The 1901 listing also shows one branch line, called the Magnolia Branch, which left the mainline at Cornie and ran northwest through Neil and Glidden to Parnell, Arkansas. The stated intent was for the line to continue north through Magnolia, Arkansas, with a projected intersection with the tracks of the St. Louis, Iron Mountain and Southern Railway north of Magnolia. However, the description of the extent of the railroad on its end-of-service date does not mention the Magnolia branch.

Besides carrying passengers, the railroad clearly had its eyes on agricultural traffic, particularly timber, in the region. In the 1901 listing, the railroad says, "This line is located near the centre of an exceedingly productive section between the Red and Ouachita Rivers: splendidly watered and exceedingly healthy. Intervening between the cultivated sections exists the most extensive virgin yellow pine forests in the South." At one point the line built a 5-mile spur to a small lumber mill in Wesson, Arkansas, which it continued to own but allowed the mill to operate. However, the mill later incorporated its own railroad, the El Dorado and Wesson Railway, and built its own line 10 miles to connect with another carrier.

The line as built interchanged with the St. Louis, Iron Mountain & Southern Railway at El Dorado, and with the Vicksburg, Shreveport and Pacific Railway at Ruston for connections to Monroe and Shreveport, Louisiana. The stated intent was for the line's own branches to someday extend to Monroe and Shreveport, but there is no indication these were built.

On October 31, 1905, the Arkansas Southern Railway was merged with another carrier, the Rock Island, Arkansas and Louisiana Railroad, to which the 98-mile El Dorado-to-Winnfield line was contributed. The Rock Island, Arkanasas, and Louisiana was a subsidiary of the Chicago, Rock Island and Pacific Railroad.
