= Enterprise Railway =

Railway company in Louisiana

Overview
- Locale: Louisiana
- Dates of operation: 1903–1914

Technical
- Track gauge: 4 ft 8 1/2 in (1,435 mm)
- Length: 12.0 miles (19.3 km)

The Enterprise Railway was incorporated in Louisiana in 1903. It operated 12.0 miles (19.3 km) of road, from a junction with the St. Louis, Iron Mountain & Southern Railway (Iron Mountain) at Simms, LA, eastward into the forest of the Enterprise Lumber Company. The lumber company had a mill in Alexandria, LA. 11 miles (18 km) of trackage rights on the Iron Mountain, from Simms south to Alexandria, connected the railroad, and the forest, to the mill. The railway company serviced this enterprise with 4 locomotives and 71 cars, which were used as logging trains. The tap line delivered timber from a loading point in the woods to the mill at Alexandria at a charge of $1.50 per 1,000 feet.

The Enterprise Railway was part of a so-called "Southern Pine System," an informal association of four lines: Griffin, Magnolia & Western Railway, Saline Bayou Railway, Enterprise Railway, and Natchez, Ball & Shreveport Railway. While their ownership or control was not clear, the four lines were similar, as was their methods of doing business.

With the Interstate Commerce Commission's (ICC) ruling in 1912, the ICC found in relation to tap lines that:

the service performed for the respective proprietary lumber companies in moving logs from their forests to their mills and the mill products to trunk lines was not a service of transportation by a common-carrier railroad and that any allowances or divisions out of the rate on account thereof are unlawful.

This ICC ruling invalidated the practice where a lumber company owned a nominal railroad and received divisions of freight rates from trunk lines. Once those allowances were eliminated, it negatively impacted a tap line's economic viability.

The Enterprise Railway ceased operations by 1914.

== See also ==
Sawmill
