= Louisiana Midland Railway =

The Louisiana Midland Railway, was a Class III railroad operating in the US state of Louisiana. The branch of the Louisiana & Arkansas Railway that would become the Louisiana Midland fell under different names those names and time line were:

1. Louisiana and Arkansas Railway (L&A) 1903 to 1946 owned by William Buchanan
2. Louisiana Midland Railway (LM) 1946 to 1967 owned by H.H. Holloway, Sr.
3. Illinois Central Gulf Railroad (ICG) 1967 to 1974 owned by ICG
4. Louisiana Midland Railway (LOAM) 1974 to 1987 owned by Craig Burroughs

== History ==
The First Louisiana Midland (LM) was formed on January 1, 1946, by H.H. Holloway, Sr. Mr. Holloway owned a gravel pit at Rhinehart, Louisiana, on the Louisiana & Arkansas Railway's (L&A) main line. When the L&A made plans to dispose of the branch Mr. Holloway knowing without the railroad his gravel pit operations would ultimately fail. The LM consisted of a 76.7-mile branch line from Packton, Louisiana, to Vidalia, Louisiana, from the Louisiana and Arkansas Railway. Passenger service was discontinued in 1953. On April 28, 1967, the Illinois Central Railroad absorbed the Louisiana Midland as part of its absorption of the Mississippi Central Railroad. On April 28, 1974, the Louisiana Midland resumed independent operations, being controlled by Craig Burroughs' Joliet-based Trans-Action Associates, Inc. The Louisiana Midland operated first with three ALCO RS-1 locomotives and later with three ALCO RS-3 locomotives.

In the 1980s, through freight service was discontinued between Packton and Ferriday, Louisiana, because of poor track conditions and lack of demand, reducing the Louisiana Midland's operations to switching service at Packton and Ferriday. Traffic at the time included pulpwood, wood products and general commodities.

Operations ceased in July 1985. On July 1, 1986, the property was sold at a sheriff's sale.

== Current ==
The bridge over Little River at Georgetown, Louisiana, still exists while most of the others are gone.
