= New Orleans and Gulf Coast Railway =

Railway in Louisiana

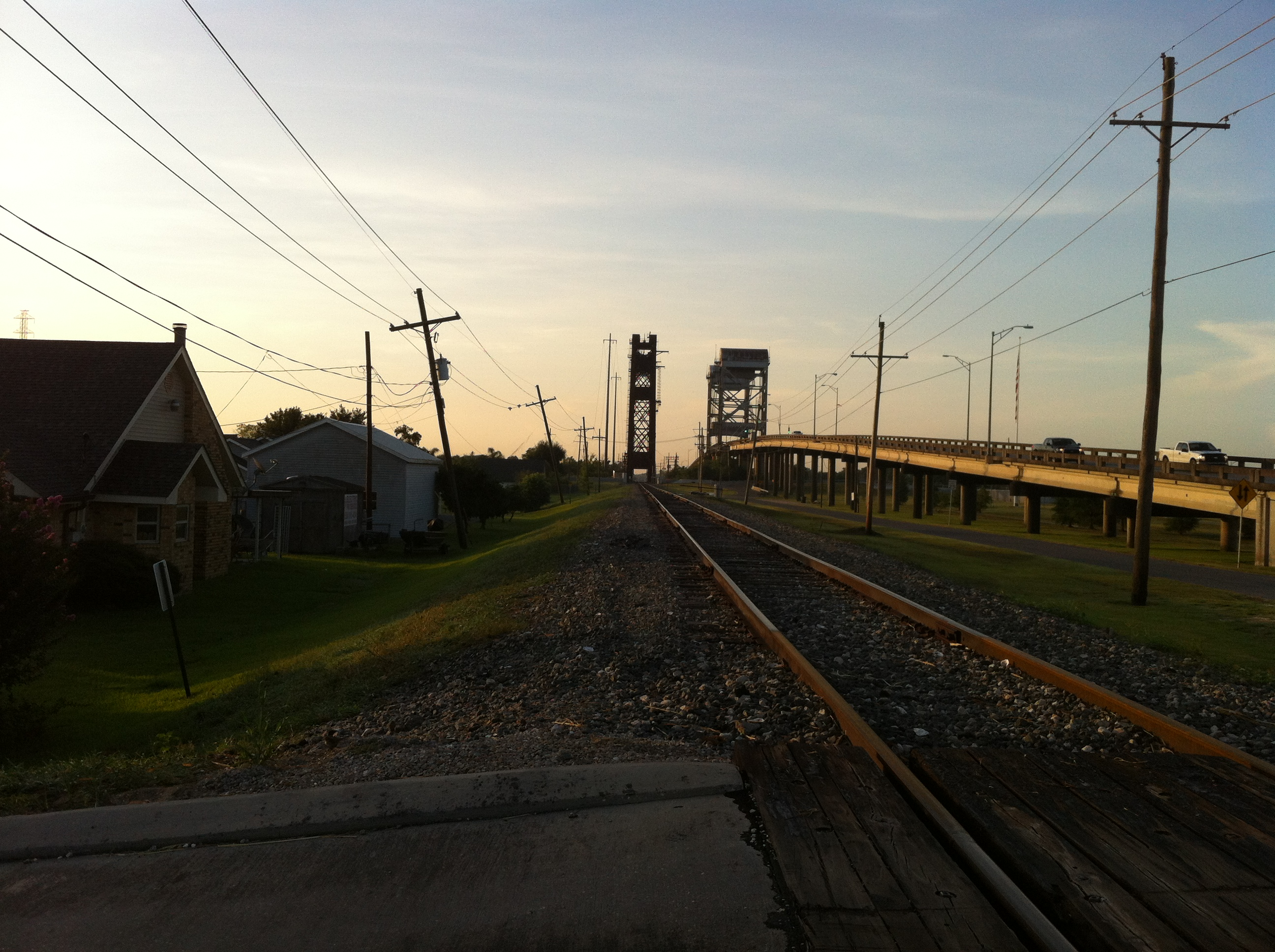
- The railway's tracks in Belle Chasse

Overview
- Reporting mark: NOGC
- Locale: Louisiana
- Dates of operation: 1997–present

Technical
- Track gauge: 4 ft 8 1/2 in (1,435 mm) standard gauge
- Length: 32 miles (51 km)

The New Orleans and Gulf Coast Railway Company (reporting mark NOGC) is a short-line railroad headquartered in Belle Chasse, Louisiana. It is a subsidiary of the Rio Grande Pacific Company and operates two former Union Pacific Railroad (UP) branch lines located outside New Orleans, Louisiana. The company operates 32 miles (51 km) of track and interchanges with the UP in Westwego.

The line delivers shipments of a variety of food products, oils, grains petroleum products, chemicals and steel products.
