= Louisiana and North West Railroad =

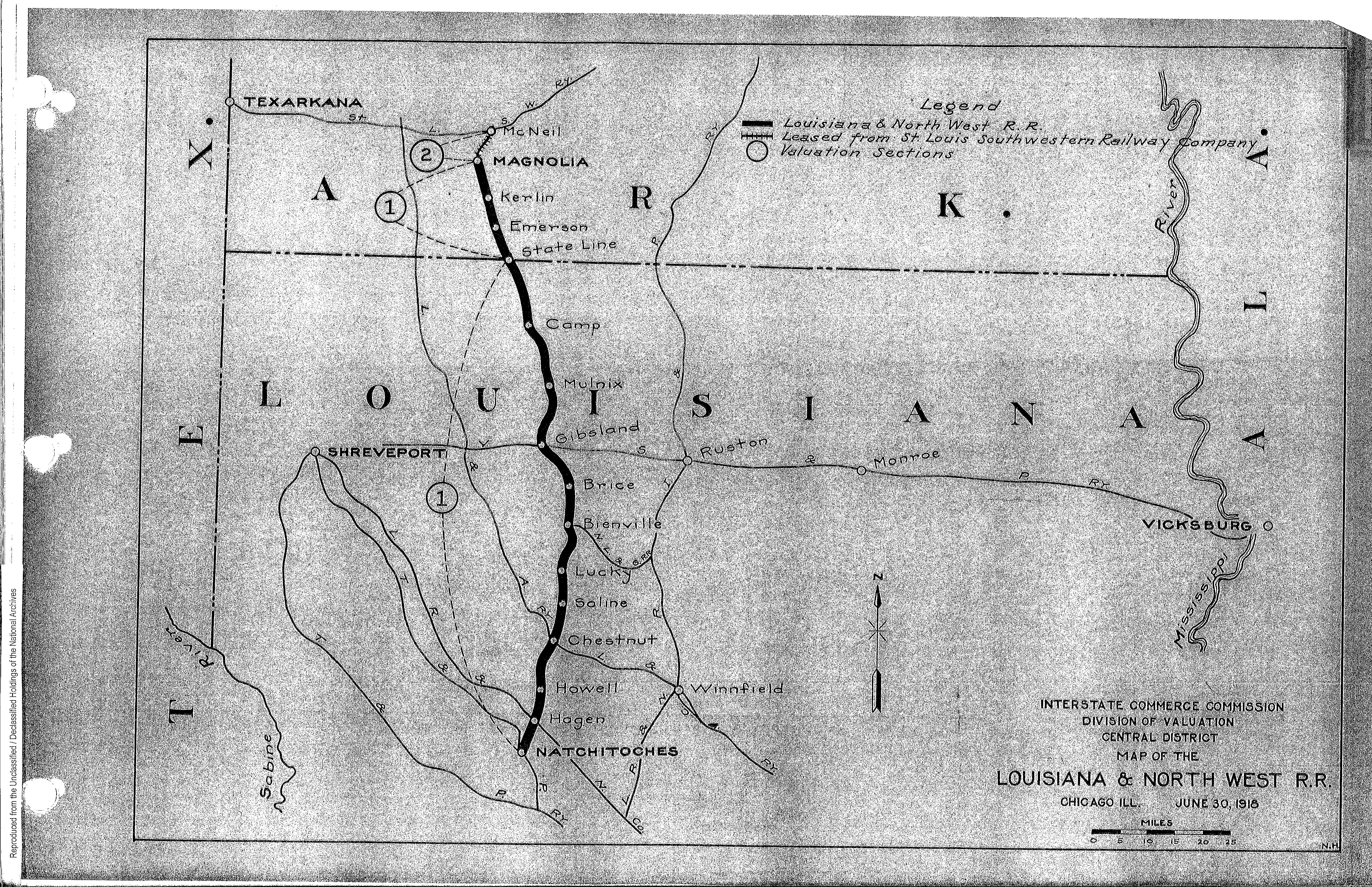
- 1917 map

Overview
- Headquarters: Homer, Louisiana
- Reporting mark: LNW
- Locale: Louisiana, Arkansas
- Dates of operation: 1889–present

Technical
- Track gauge: 4 ft 8 1/2 in (1,435 mm) standard gauge
- Length: 68 miles

The Louisiana and Northwest Railroad (reporting mark LNW) is a short-line railroad headquartered in Homer, Louisiana.

LNW operates a 62.6-mile (100.7 km) line in Arkansas and Louisiana from McNeil, Arkansas (where it interchanges with Union Pacific Railroad), to Gibsland, Louisiana (where it interchanges with Canadian Pacific Kansas City). The 6.5-mile (10.5 km) section from McNeil to Magnolia, Arkansas, is leased from Union Pacific.

LNW was incorporated in 1889. On June 10, 2008, Patriot Rail Corporation announced that it had purchased LNW for an undisclosed amount.
