= Louisiana Southern Railway =

Defunct American railroad

The Louisiana Southern Railway Company (LS) was a railroad in southern Louisiana, chartered in 1897 as successor to several short lines which had operated along the Mississippi River, including Mississippi, Terre aux Boeuf, and Lake; New Orleans and Gulf; and New Orleans and Southern, that eventually became part of the Southern Railway system.

The Railway was originally owned jointly by Franklin (Frank) Emery Prewett (1872-1936) and his half-brother, Granville Prewett (1896-1973). both of Baton Rouge, Louisiana. Frank was the son of Vernal Franklin Prewett (1841-1911), of West Virginia, then Tennessee, and his first wife, Susan C. Ross (c. 1850–1878). Granville was the son of Vernal Franklin Prewett and, apparently, his second spouse, Emma Lucy Ross. In 1907, the elder Prewett then married Ardelia (Della) Bowers, later Gooch (1868-1916).

The main line was New Orleans to Bohemia, Louisiana, about 50 miles. However, the line had total trackage of 65.1 miles by the early 1920s. The line was leased to the New Orleans, Texas and Mexico Railway, operated by the Gulf Coast Lines, on February 1, 1911; but, the National Railway Labor Board ruled in the 1920s that the line was still independent of Gulf Coast Lines. By that time, sugar cane and sugar products, which had previously been a major commodity for the railroad, had ceased to be, due to closure of the sugar mills in the area. That left truck farms, or large-scale market gardens, as about the line's only traffic.

In 1952, Southern bought what was then a 15-mile line, running along the Mississippi River from New Orleans to Braithwaite, Louisiana.
