= East Camden and Highland Railroad =

Overview
- Headquarters: East Camden, Arkansas
- Reporting mark: EACH
- Locale: Arkansas, Louisiana, Iowa, Tennessee
- Dates of operation: 1972–present

Technical
- Track gauge: 4 ft 8 1/2 in (1,435 mm) standard gauge

The East Camden and Highland Railroad (reporting mark EACH) is a Class III short-line railroad with two main facilities in East Camden, Arkansas, and in Minden, Louisiana. It began operation in East Camden Industrial Park on July 24, 1972.

EACH operates a 47.6 mile (76.6 km) line in Arkansas from East Camden to Eagle Mills (where it interchanges with Union Pacific Railroad). EACH traffic generally consists of freight transportation of lumber, paper products and scrap paper, synthetic bulk rubber, and chemicals.

EACH also provides switching services at locations in four states:

- The Highland Industrial Park in East Camden (formerly the Shumaker Ordnance Depot), with interchange to Union Pacific
- The Louisiana Army Ammunition Plant at Doyline, Louisiana, with interchange to Kansas City Southern Railway
- The Iowa Army Ammunition Plant at Middletown, Iowa, with interchange to BNSF Railway
- The Milan Army Ammunition Plant at Milan, Tennessee, with interchanges to CSX Transportation and Norfolk Southern

EACH was incorporated in 1971.
