= Alexandria & Western Railway =

Railroad in the southern United States

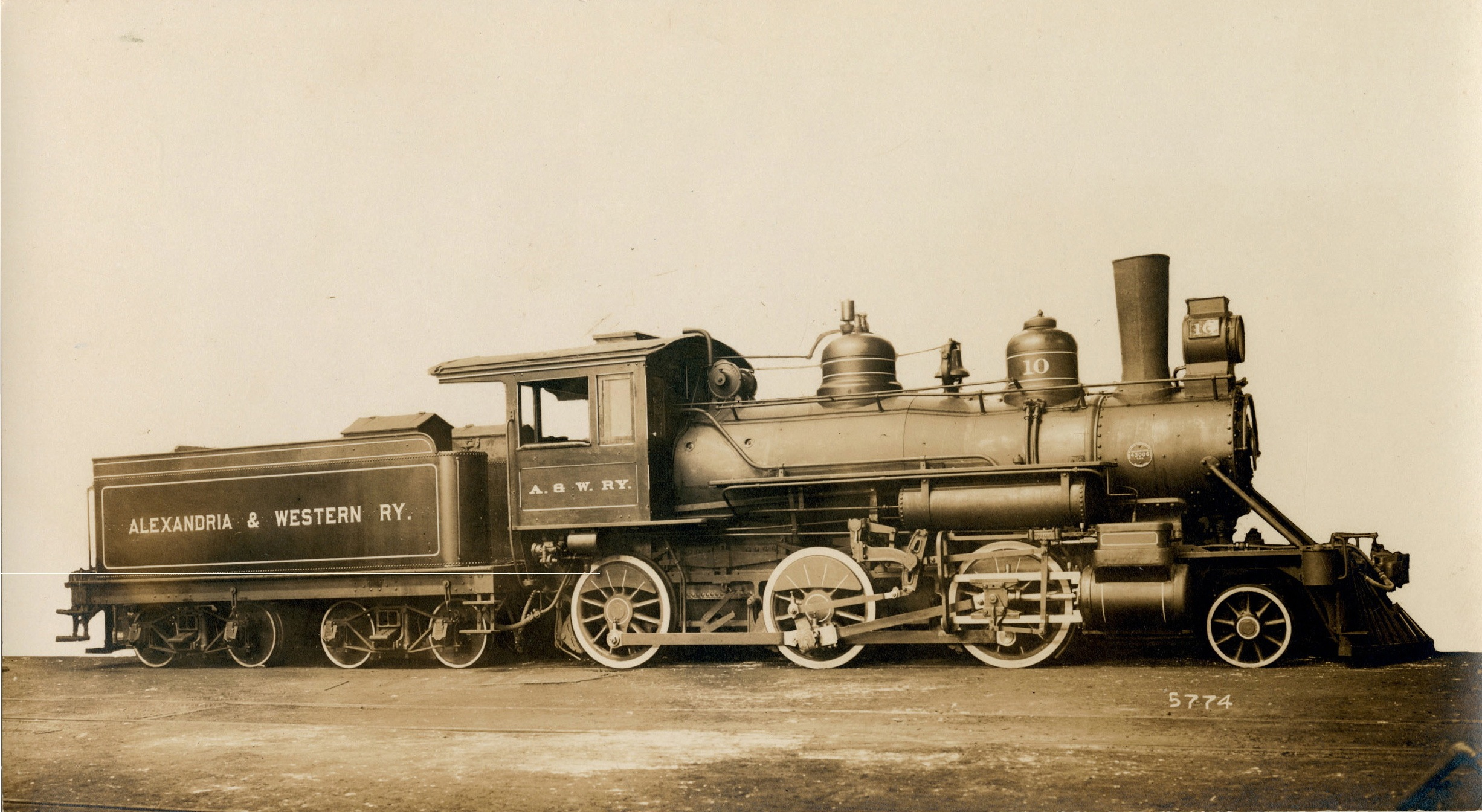
- Alexandria & Western Railway Engine No. 10

Overview
- Headquarters: Alexandria, LA
- Locale: Louisiana
- Dates of operation: 1909–1925

Technical
- Track gauge: 4 ft 8 1/2 in (1,435 mm) standard gauge

The Alexandria & Western Railway was a regional railroad chartered on September 15, 1909 with George F. Cotter of Fort Worth, Texas, as its president and a number of investors from Kansas City, Missouri. Its purpose was to transport lumber from Alexandria, Louisiana, west to Texas, though it only reached as far west as Gardner, Louisiana. Construction began in early 1913 after the Bayou Rapides Lumber Company purchased 8,000 acres of land on the proposed right-of-way and guaranteed the railroad a steady supply of lumber to haul. The first spike was driven by Rollo Jarreau.

In the spring of 1914, the line expanded service to include passenger travel using a 21-foot car powered by a gasoline engine operating from a depot at Second Street and Lee Street in Alexandria.

By June 30, 1915, the railroad ended its fiscal year operating at a loss of $7,000. In 1916, a suit was filed against the Alexandria & Western Railway by Brewer-Neinstadt Lumber Company concerning the rate the railroad was charging to transport hardwood and cypress lumber and lathes, and shingles from Miltonburg to Alexandria. A hearing on April 27, 1916, concluded that the rate of 4 cents per 100 pounds that the railroad charged was in line with or less than the rates charged by other railroads in the state, and the suit was dismissed.

Continued financial difficulties forced the railroad to file for abandonment in May 1925.

== Equipment ==
Amongst the engines operated on the line was a 2-6-0 locomotive manufactured at the American Locomotive Company's Schenectady Locomotive Works (Construction #30988) in April 1905. The locomotive was originally built for Genesee and Wyoming Railroad (road number 7) before it was sold to the Birmhamton Rail & Loco Co. and then resold to the Alexandria & Western Railway in Garden City, Louisiana.

Manufactured for the Alexandria & Western Railway were two 2-6-0 "Mogul" type locomotives built at the Baldwin Locomotive Works in 1914, numbered 9 and 10. After the railroad filed for abandonment, Crossett Lumber purchased engine number 9 and renumbered it to either 102 or 103. Crossett Lumber later sold it to Frost Lumber Industries.
