= European DataWarehouse =

EuropeanDataWarehouse
- European DataWarehouse
- Industry: Data warehousing
- Founded: January 2012
- Headquarters: Frankfurt, Germany
- Key people: Christian Thun CEO
- Website: eurodw.eu

European DataWarehouse (EDW) is a Securitisation Repository designated by both the European Securities and Markets Authority (ESMA) and the Financial Conduct Authority (FCA). European DataWarehouse GmbH is part of the ABS Loan Level Data initiative established by the European Central Bank that is engaged in providing data warehousing services and full disclosure for investors in asset-backed securities (ABS). It provides an open platform for users to access asset-backed security data.

It is the first centralised data repository in Europe for collecting, validating and making accessible to download point-by-point, institutionalised and asset class specific loan-level data (LLD) for asset-backed securities (ABS) transactions. European DataWarehouse helps to facilitate risk assessment and improve transparency for European ABS deals.

== History ==
=== ABS initiative ===
The ABS Loan-Level Initiative was a Eurozone initiative from 2012 to standardize asset-backed securities (ABSs) information accepted as collateral in Eurosystem credit operations. It was put forward in response to the 2008 financial crisis, as the European Central Bank (ECB) wanted to restore confidence in the securitisations market.

The initiative began after support for the idea was recognised at an ECB public consultation. It establishes specific information requirements for asset-backed securities (ABSs) accepted as collateral in Eurosystem credit operations. The aim was to allow market participants access to standardized timely information on loans and their performance. Access to this information should allow market actors to make more informed decisions regarding asset backed securities. The Eurosystem believed that the new data requirements would help both investors and third-party assessment providers with their due diligence. It was hoped that the loan level initiative would help instill transparency and, ultimately, confidence back into the securitisation market following the 2008 financial crisis. The perceived problems were a lack of transparency and the absence of a standardised system across asset classes. These made it difficult to make accurate risk assessments of the securities. Enabling better risk assessment would then have the effect of encouraging investors and reducing then current levels of reliance on the Eurosystem.

Following the ECB initiative, the Bank of England made "Loan Level Information" one of their extended eligibility criteria for ABS collateral, but without a costly central data warehouse and with free access to market participants.

=== Data warehouse created ===
The result of this development work is European Data Warehouse GmbH. European DataWarehouse was founded in January 2012 for the purpose of facilitating risk assessment and improving transparency in European asset-backed security (ABS) deals.

=== Evolution ===
European DataWarehouse Ltd. was designated as a Securitisation regulation under the FCA in December 2020, which followed the establishment of a UK subsidiary, European DataWarehouse Ltd, as well as a UK office.

European DataWarehouse GmbH was designated as a Securitisation Repository under ESMA in June 2021, more than three years after the Securitisation Regulation (EU)2017/2402 came into force.

== Responsibilities ==
European DataWarehouse's responsibilities include ensuring that ABS market data is openly accessible and that all transactions are recorded. A key aim of European DataWarehouse is to instil trust back into the ABS market. The European Central Bank is set to make compliance with loan-level data disclosure compulsory before it will accept asset-backed securities as collateral for financing.

== Boards ==
EDW has three decision-making bodies and 16 shareholders.

Supervisory board

The main decision-making body. It comprises the shareholder members and governors/observers from the ECB and NCB. It is responsible for strategy and monitoring EDW's operations.

Pricing committee

Sets the fee structure for EDW customers and consists of eight members of the ABS industry.

EDW management

Management of European DataWarehouse GmbH is Represented by Dr. Christian Thun (CEO), Gopala Krishnan Sankaran (CTO), and Sascha Schimpfermann (CFO).

Management of the UK Subsidiary, European DataWarehouse Ltd., is represented by Markus Schaber.

The EDW shareholders are:

Banco Bilbao Vizcaya Argentaria S.A.
Banco Santander S.A.
BNP Paribas S.A.
CaixaBank S.A.
Crédit Agricole S.A.
Crédit Foncier de France
Creditreform Rating AG
DBRS
Dutch Securitisation Association
Instituto de Crédito Oficial
Intesa Sanpaolo S.P.A.
Moody's Group Cyprus Limited
Sapient Global Market
Société Générale S.A.
True Sale International
UniCredit S.P.A.

== Awards ==
The company received the Banking Technology Award for the Best Industry Infrastructure Initiative in 2012 and was named "Securitization Data Provider of the Year" by GlobalCapital in 2019 and 2022.
