= Queen and Crescent Limited =

Defunct American passenger train service

Overview
- Service type: Inter-city rail
- First service: 1926
- Last service: 1949
- Former operator: Southern Railway

Route
- Termini: Cincinnati, Ohio; New Orleans, Louisiana
- Train numbers: 43 and 44

The Queen and Crescent Limited was a named passenger train operated by the Southern Railway in the United States of America. It was operated over a historic route that had been established in the late 1800s called the Queen and Crescent Route, which referred to Cincinnati as the "Queen City" and New Orleans as the "Crescent City".

The train began service in 1926 and it was never a financial success. The Southern Railway operated the Queen and Crescent Limited from Cincinnati, Ohio to New Orleans, Louisiana via Lexington, Kentucky, Chattanooga, Tennessee, Birmingham, Alabama and Meridian, Mississippi. The new train carried both coaches and Pullman sleepers and a dining car. Its road numbers on the Southern Railway were #43 (southbound) and #44 (northbound).

== Accidents ==
- On the first year of operation, the train derailed on October 15, 1926, one half mile south of Williamstown, Kentucky. One engineer died and another was seriously injured, but no passengers died.
- On February 4, 1947, the Queen and Crescent struck a car and killed three persons near New Orleans.

== End of service ==
The Queen and Crescent was removed from the timetable by 1949 and only a remnant remained: Southern operated Train numbers 43 and 44 between Birmingham, Alabama and Meridian, Mississippi as a local.
