= List of shortline railroads in the United States by state =

This is a list of current shortline railroads (FRA Class III) in the United States. The reporting mark assigned by the Association of American Railroads (AAR) is listed for each entry.

== Alabama ==
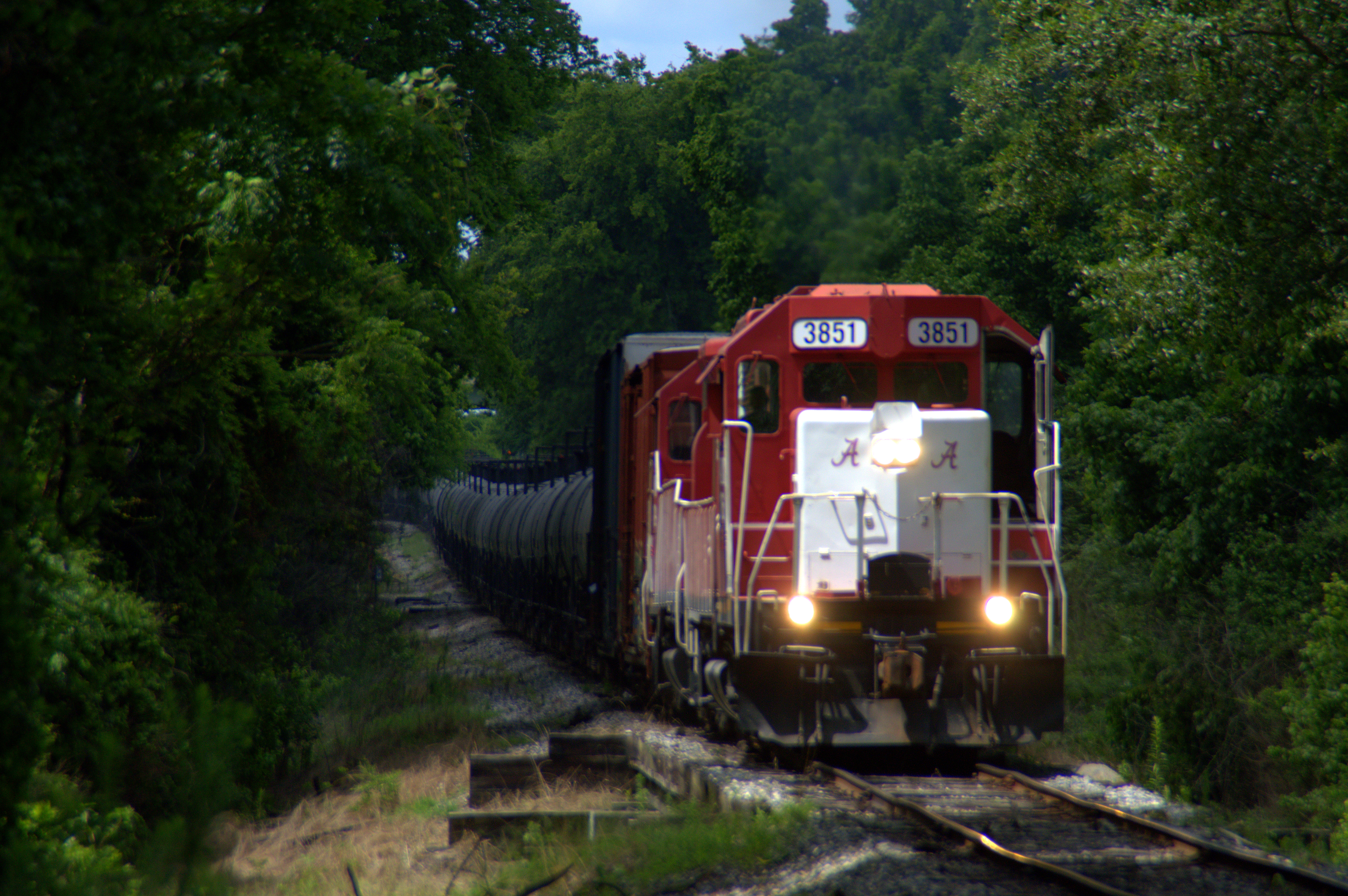
The Alabama Southern Railroad

Railroad	AAR rep. mark	Owner/Lessee
Alabama & Tennessee River Railway	ATN	OmniTRAX
Alabama Southern Railroad	ABS	Watco
Alabama Warrior Railway	ABWR	Watco
Autauga Northern Railroad	AUT	Watco
Bay Line Railroad	BAYL	Genesee and Wyoming
Birmingham Terminal Railway	BHRR	Watco
Columbus & Chattahoochee Railroad	CHH	Genesee and Wyoming
CG Railway	CGR	Genesee and Wyoming
Conecuh Valley Railroad	COEH	Genesee and Wyoming
Eastern Alabama Railway	EARY	Genesee and Wyoming
Georgia Southwestern Railroad	GSWR	Genesee and Wyoming
Huntsville & Madison County Railroad Authority	HMCR	OmniTRAX
Luxapalila Valley Railroad	LXVR	Genesee and Wyoming
Meridian & Bigbee Railroad	MNBR	Genesee and Wyoming
Sequatchie Valley Railroad	SQVR	
Terminal Railway Alabama State Docks	TASD	Alabama State Port Authority
Three Notch Railroad	TNHR	Genesee and Wyoming
Tennessee Southern Railroad	TSRR	Patriot Rail Company
Wiregrass Central Railroad	WGCR	Genesee and Wyoming

== Arizona ==
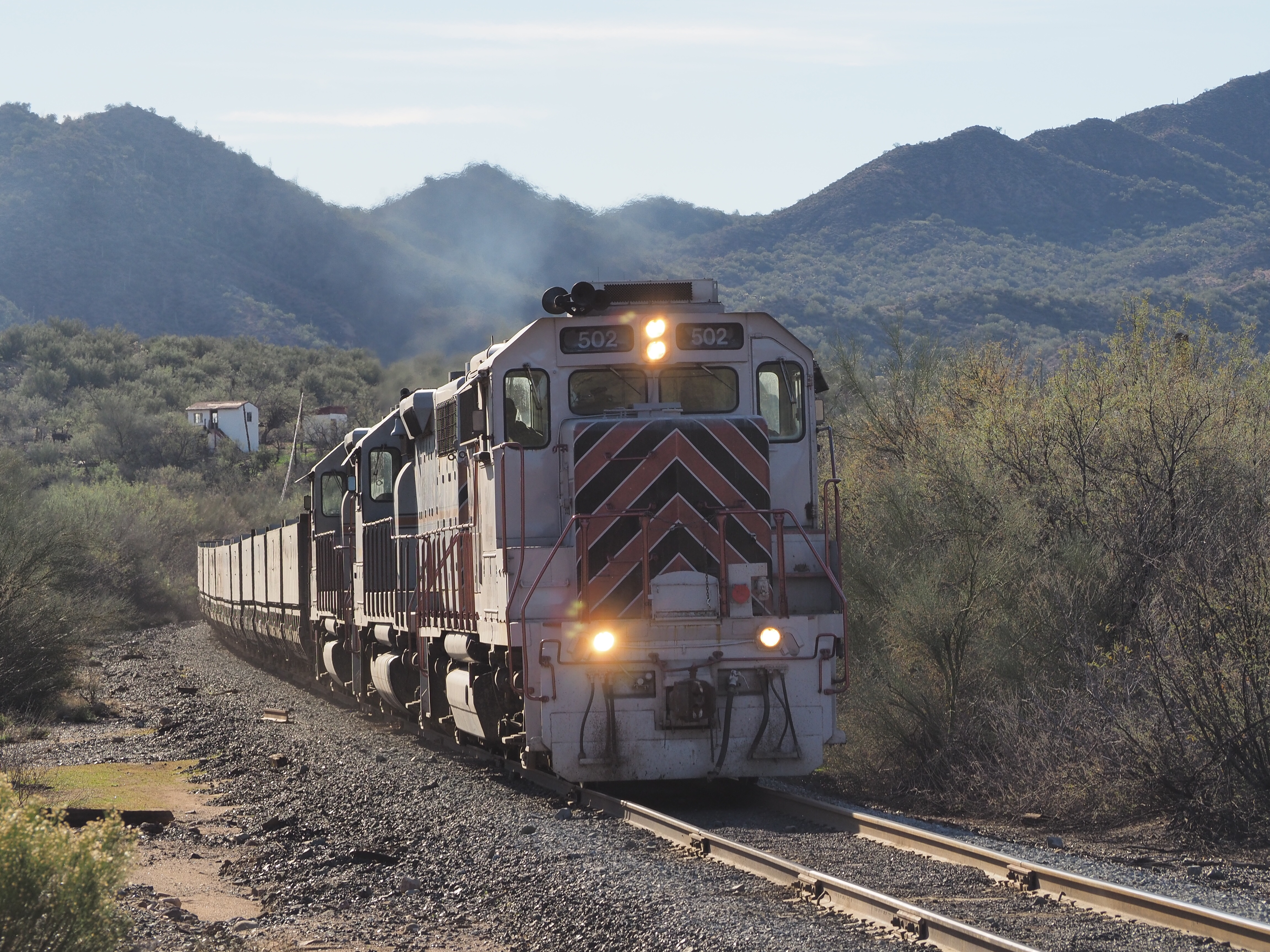
The Copper Basin Railway

Railroad	AAR rep. mark	Owner/Lessee
Apache Railway	APA	
Arizona & California Railroad	ARZC	Genesee and Wyoming
Arizona Central Railroad	AZCR	
Arizona Eastern Railway	AZER	Genesee and Wyoming
Clarkdale Arizona Central Railroad	AZCR	
Copper Basin Railway	CBRY	
Drake Switching Company		
Kingman Terminal Railroad	KGTR	Patriot Rail Company
San Pedro Valley Railroad	SPSR	Genesee and Wyoming

== Arkansas ==
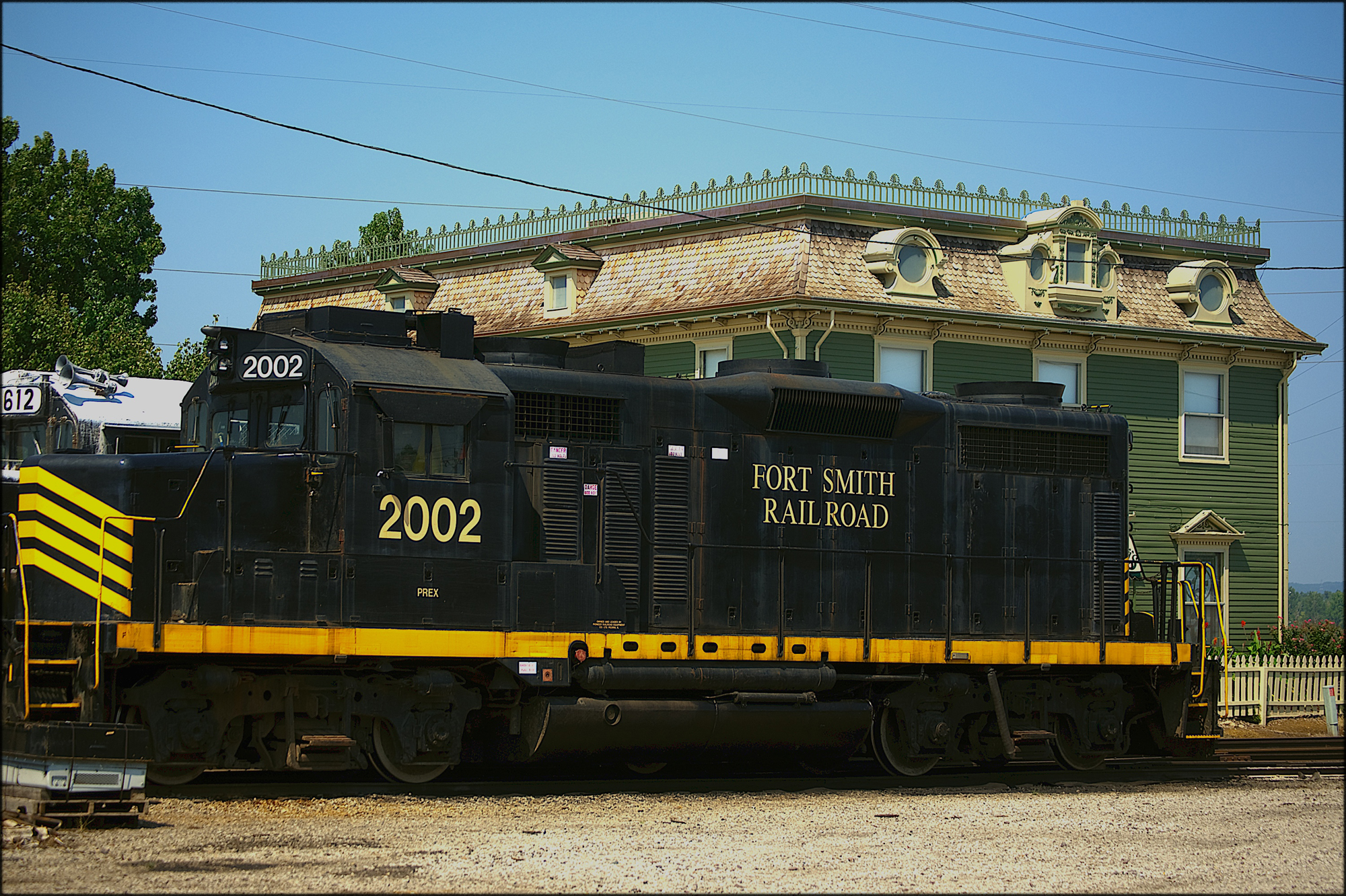
The Fort Smith Railroad

Railroad	AAR rep. mark	Owner/Lessee
Arkansas & Missouri Railroad	AM	
Arkansas Southern Railroad	ARS	Watco
Dardanelle and Russellville Railroad	DR	
Fort Smith Railroad	FSR	Pioneer Railcorp

== California ==
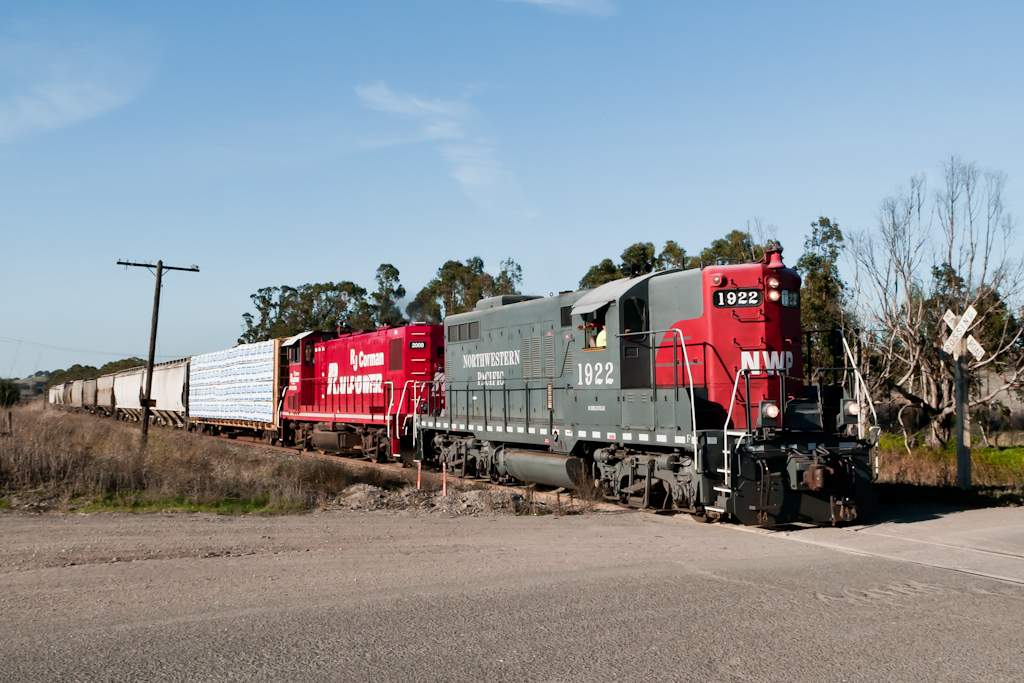
The Northwestern Pacific Railroad

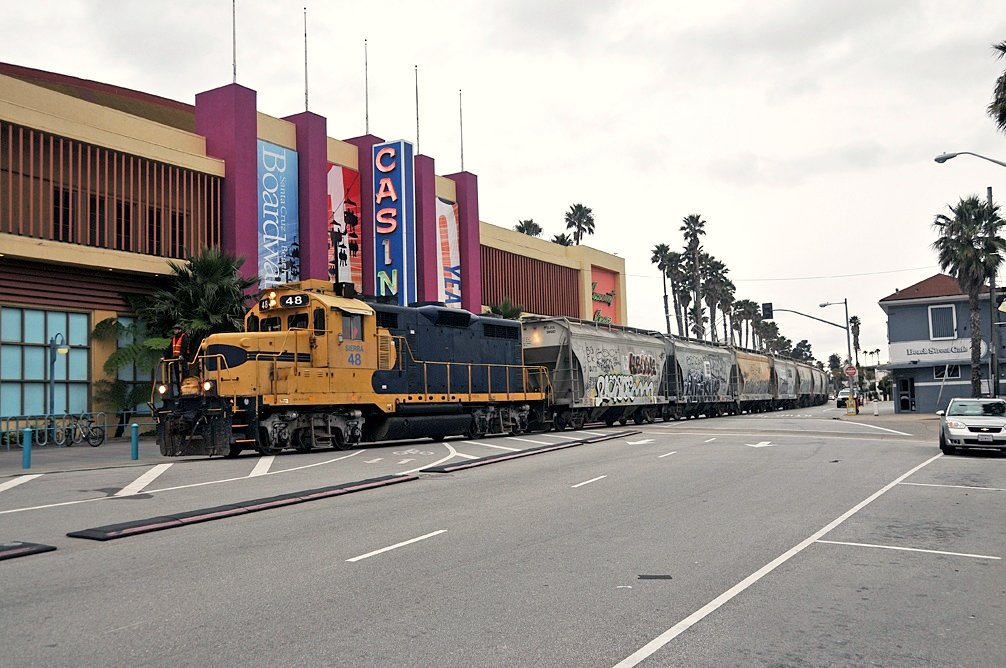
The Sierra Northern Railway

Railroad	AAR rep. mark	Owner/Lessee
California Northern Railroad	CFNR	Genesee and Wyoming
California Western Railroad	CWR	
Carrizo Gorge Railway	CZRY	
Central California Traction	CCT	
McCloud Railway	MCR	
Modesto & Empire Traction Company	MET	
Mountain Pacific Railroad	MPR	
Northwestern Pacific Railroad	NWP	
Pacific Harbor Line	PHL	
Pacific Sun Railroad	PSRR	Watco
Richmond Pacific Railroad	RPRC	
St. Paul & Pacific Railroad	SPP	Progressive Rail Inc.
San Diego & Imperial Valley Railroad	SDIY	Genesee and Wyoming
San Francisco Bay Railroad	SFBR	
San Joaquin Valley Railroad	SJVR	Genesee and Wyoming
Santa Maria Valley Railroad	SMV	
Sierra Northern Railway	SERA	
Trona Railway	TRC	

== Colorado ==
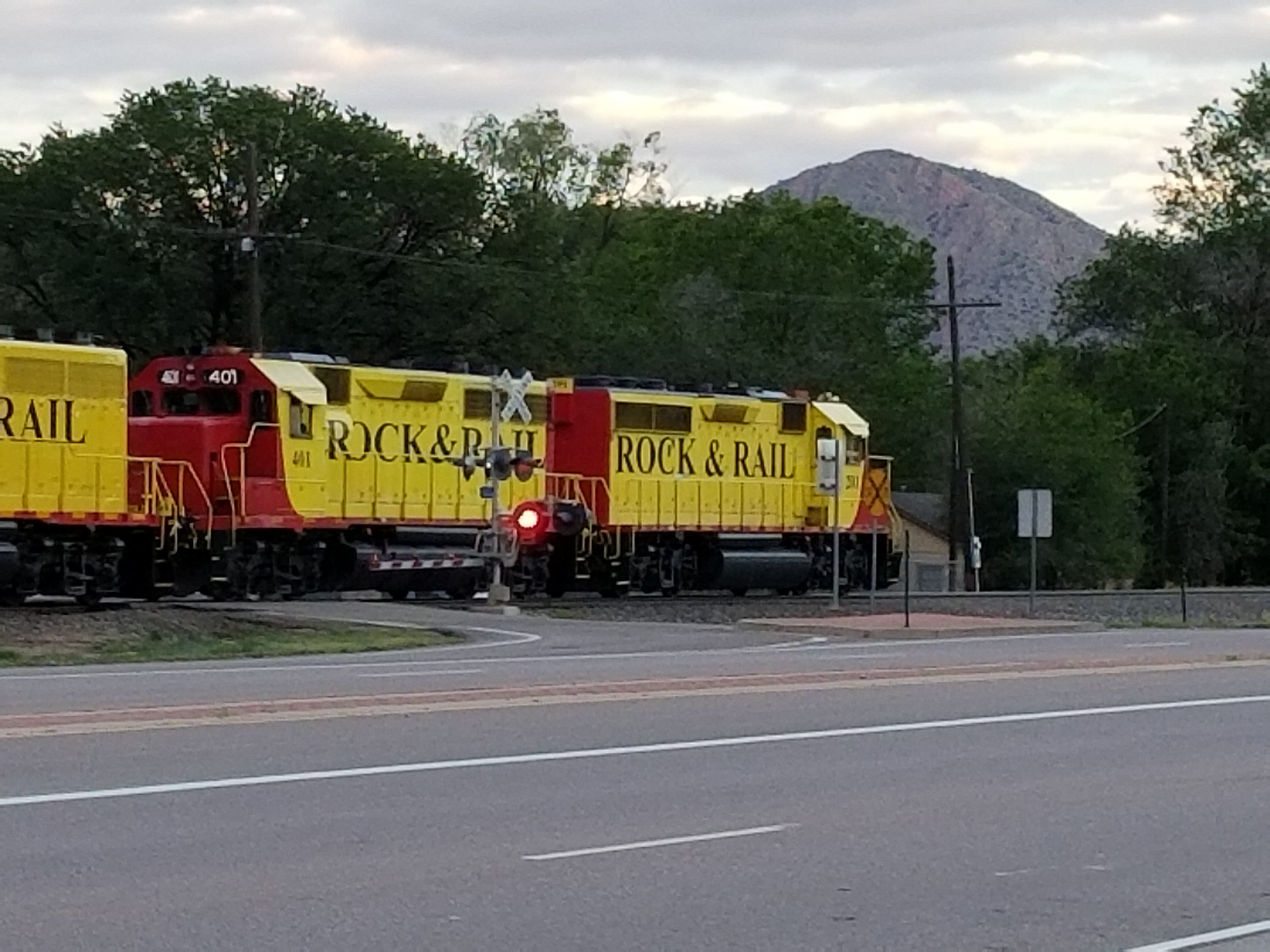
The Rock & Rail Railroad

Railroad	AAR rep. mark	Owner/Lessee
Denver Rock Island Railroad	DRIR	
Great Western Railroad of Colorado	GWR	
Rock & Rail	RRRR	
San Luis & Rio Grande Railroad	SLRG	

== Connecticut ==
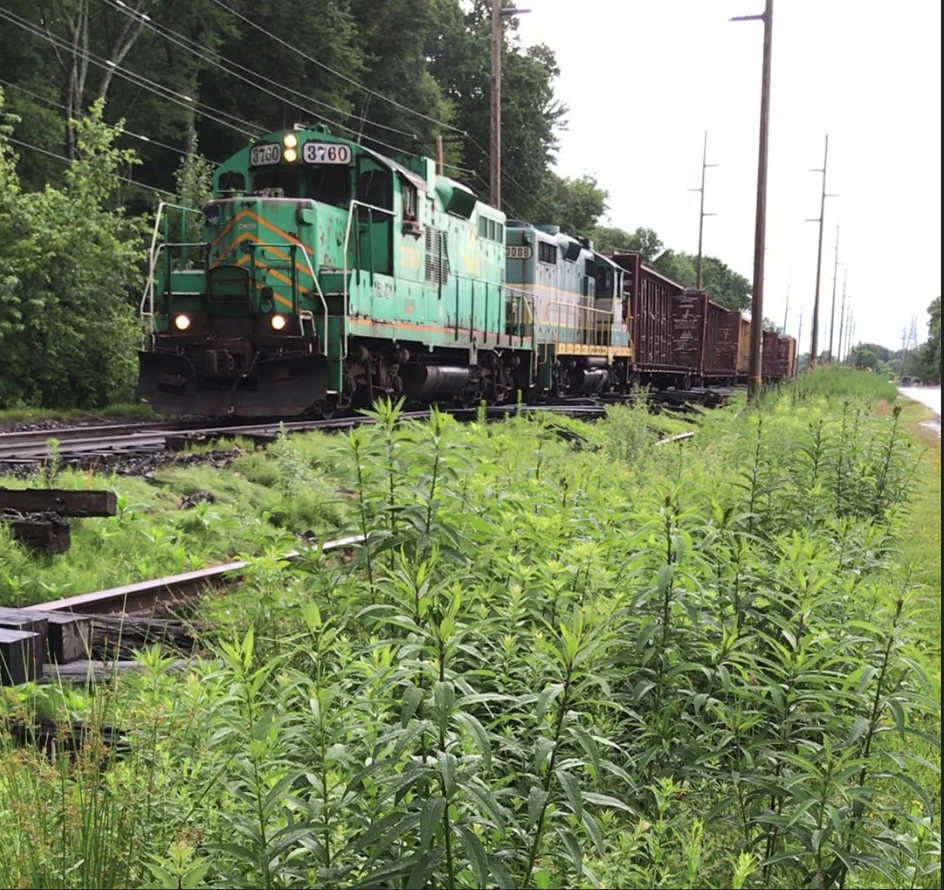
The Central New England Railroad

Railroad	AAR rep. mark	Owner/Lessee
Branford Steam Railroad	BRFD	
Housatonic Railroad	HRRC	
Central New England Railroad	CNZR	
Connecticut Southern Railroad	CSOR	Genesee and Wyoming

== Delaware ==
Railroad	AAR rep. mark	Owner/Lessee
Delmarva Central Railroad	DCR	
East Penn Railroad	ESPN	Regional Rail
Maryland & Delaware Railroad	MDDE	
Wilmington & Western Railroad	WWRC	

== Florida ==
Railroad	AAR rep. mark	Owner/Lessee
AN Railway	AN	Genesee and Wyoming
Bay Line Railroad	BAYL	Genesee and Wyoming
First Coast Railroad	FCRD	Genesee and Wyoming
NASA Railroad	NLAX	
Seminole Gulf Railway	SGLR	Bay Colony Railroad
South Central Florida Express	SCFE	

== Georgia ==
Railroad	AAR rep. mark	Owner/Lessee
Chattahoochee Industrial Railroad	CIRR	Genesee & Wyoming
Georgia Central Railway	GC	Genesee & Wyoming
Georgia Northeastern Railroad	GNRR	Patriot Rail Company
Georgia Southwestern Railroad	GSWR	Genesee & Wyoming
Sandersville Railroad	SAN	
St. Mary's Railroad	SM	
Valdosta Railway	VR	Genesee & Wyoming

== Idaho ==
Railroad	AAR rep. mark	Owner/Lessee
Boise Valley Railroad	BVRR	Watco
Eastern Idaho Railroad	EIRR	Watco
Great Northwest Railroad	GRNW	Watco
Idaho Northern and Pacific Railroad	INPR	Rio Grande Pacific
Pend Oreille Valley Railroad	POVR	
St. Maries River Railroad	STMA	

== Illinois ==
Railroad	AAR rep. mark	Owner/Lessee
Bloomer Line	BLOL	
Central Illinois Railroad	CIRY	
Chicago Junction Railway	CJR	Progressive Rail, Inc.
Chicago, St. Paul & Pacific Railroad	CSP	Progressive Rail Inc
Crab Orchard and Egyptian Railway	COER	Progressive Rail Inc
Decatur Junction Railway	DT	Pioneer Railcorp
Eastern Illinois Railroad	EIRC	
Fisher Farmers Grain & Coal Railroad	FFGC	
Foster Townsend Rail Logistics	FTRL	
Illinois Railway	IR	OmniTRAX
Keokuk Junction Railway	KJRY	Patriot Rail Company
Peoria & Western Railway	PWRY	
Tazewell & Peoria Railroad	TZPR	Genesee and Wyoming
Toledo, Peoria and Western Railway	TPW	Genesee and Wyoming

== Indiana ==
Railroad	AAR rep. mark	Owner/Lessee
Algers, Winslow & Western Railway	AWW	
Bee Line Railroad	BLEX	
Central Indiana and Western Railroad	CEIW	
Central Railroad Company of Indiana	CIND	Genesee and Wyoming
Central Railroad Company of Indianapolis	CERA	Genesee and Wyoming
Chesapeake and Indiana Railroad	CKIN	Gulf & Atlantic Railways
Chicago, Fort Wayne & Eastern Railroad	CFE	Genesee and Wyoming
Chicago South Shore & South Bend Railroad	CSS	Anacostia Rail Holdings Company
Dubois County Railroad	DCRR	
Elkhart and Western Railroad	EWR	Pioneer Railcorp
Evansville Western Railway	EVWR	P&L Transportation
Fulton County Railroad	FC	
Grand Elk Railroad	GDLK	Watco
Honey Creek Railroad	HCRR	
Hoosier Southern Railroad	HOS	
Indian Creek Railroad	ICRK	
Indiana Harbor Belt Railroad	IHB	
Indiana Northeastern Railroad	IN	
Indiana Southern Railroad	ISRR	Genesee and Wyoming
Indiana Southwestern Railway	ISW	Patriot Rail
Kankakee, Beaverville and Southern Railroad	KBSR	
Louisville and Indiana Railroad	LIRC	Anacostia Rail Holdings Company
Lucas Oil Rail Line	LORL	
Madison Railroad	CMPA	
Toledo, Peoria and Western Railway	TPW	Genesee and Wyoming
Vermilion Valley Railroad	VVRR	Gulf & Atlantic Railways
Wabash Central Railroad	WBCR	

== Iowa ==
Railroad	AAR rep. mark	Owner/Lessee
Burlington Junction Railway	BJRY	
Cedar Rapids and Iowa City Railway	CIC	
Iowa Northern Railway	IANR	Progressive Rail
Iowa Traction Railway	IATR	Progressive Rail

== Kansas ==
Railroad	AAR rep. mark	Owner/Lessee
Kansas & Oklahoma Railroad	KO	Watco
Kansas City Terminal Railway	KCT	Watco
Kaw River Railroad	KAW	Watco
Kyle Railroad	KYLE	Genesee and Wyoming
South Kansas & Oklahoma Railroad	SKOL	Watco

== Louisiana ==
Railroad	AAR rep. mark	Owner/Lessee
Baton Rouge Southern Railroad	BRS	Watco
Louisiana Southern Railroad	LAS	Watco
New Orleans and Gulf Coast Railway	NOGC	Rio Grande Pacific Company
New Orleans Public Belt Railroad	NOPB	

== Maine ==
Railroad	AAR rep. mark	Owner/Lessee
Eastern Maine Railway (1995)	EMRY	
Maine Northern Railway	MNRY	
St Lawrence & Atlantic Railroad	SLR	Genesee and Wyoming

== Maryland ==
Railroad	AAR rep. mark	Owner/Lessee
Delmarva Central Railroad	DCR	
Maryland & Delaware Railroad	MDDE	Carload Express, Inc.
Maryland Midland Railway	MMID	Genesee and Wyoming
Tradepoint Rail	TPR	

== Massachusetts ==
Railroad	AAR rep. mark	Owner/Lessee
East Brookfield & Spencer Railroad	EBSR	
Fore River Railroad	FRVT	
Grafton & Upton Railroad	GU	
Massachusetts Central Railroad	MCER	
Pioneer Valley Railroad	PVRR	Gulf & Atlantic Railways

== Michigan ==
Railroad	AAR rep. mark	Owner/Lessee
Adrian and Blissfield Rail Road	ADBF	
Ann Arbor Railroad	AA	Watco
Charlotte Southern Railroad	CHS	
Coopersville and Marne Railway	CPMY	
Delray Connecting Railroad	DC	Transtar, Inc.
Detroit Connecting Railroad	DCON	
Escanaba and Lake Superior Railroad	ELS	
Grand Elk Railroad	GDLK	Watco
Grand Rapids Eastern Railroad	GR	Genesee & Wyoming
Huron & Eastern Railway	HESR	Genesee & Wyoming
Indiana Northeastern Railroad	IN	
Jackson and Lansing Railroad	JAIL	
Lake State Railway	LSRC	
Lake Superior & Ishpeming Railroad	LSI	
Lapeer Industrial Railroad	LIRR	
Marquette Rail	MQT	Genesee & Wyoming
Michigan Shore Railroad	MS	Genesee & Wyoming
Michigan Southern Railroad	MSO	Pioneer Railcorp
Mid-Michigan Railroad	MMRR	Genesee & Wyoming
West Michigan Railroad	WMI	Hamilton Hartford Group

== Minnesota ==
Railroad	AAR rep. mark	Owner/Lessee
Cannon Valley Railroad	CVRC	Progressive Rail, Inc.
Cloquet Terminal Railroad	CTRR	
Minnesota Northern Railroad	MNN	Independent Locomotive Service
Minnesota Prairie Line	MPLI	Minnesota Valley Regional Railroad Authority
Northern Lines Railway	NLR	Anacostia and Pacific Company, Inc
Red River Valley & Western Railroad	RRVW	Minnesota Valley Regional Railroad Authority
Twin Cities & Western Railroad	TCW	Minnesota Valley Regional Railroad Authority

== Mississippi ==
Railroad	AAR rep. mark	Owner/Lessee
Meridian Southern Railway	MDS	
Mississippian Railway	MSRW	
Mississippi Delta Railroad	MDR	Gulf and Ohio Railways
Mississippi Export Railroad	MSE	
Mississippi Southern Railroad	MSR	
Vicksburg Southern Railroad	VSOR	Watco

== Missouri ==
Railroad	AAR rep. mark	Owner/Lessee
Arkansas and Missouri Railroad	AM	
Columbia Terminal Railroad	CT	
Kansas City Terminal Railway	KCT	
Terminal Railroad Association of St Louis	TRRA	

== Nebraska ==
Railroad	AAR rep. mark	Owner/Lessee
Brandon Corporation	BRAN	
Fremont and Elkhorn Valley Railroad	FEVR	
Kyle Railroad	KYLE	Genesee & Wyoming
Nebraska Central Railroad	NCRC	Rio Grande Pacific Corporation
Nebraska Kansas Colorado Railway	NKC	OmniTRAX
Nebraska Northeastern Railway	NENE	
Nebraska Northwestern Railroad	NNW	
Omaha, Lincoln and Beatrice Railway	OLB	
Sidney and Lowe Railroad	SLGG	Progress Rail

== New Hampshire ==
Railroad	AAR rep. mark	Owner/Lessee
Milford-Bennington Railroad	MBRX	
New Hampshire Central Railroad	NHCR	

== New Jersey ==
Railroad	AAR rep. mark	Owner/Lessee
Belvidere and Delaware River Railway	BDRV	Chesapeake and Delaware, LLC
Black River & Western Railroad	BRW	Chesapeake and Delaware, LLC
Cape May Seashore Lines	CMSL	
Dover and Delaware River Railroad	DD	Chesapeake and Delaware, LLC
Dover & Rockaway River Railroad	DRRV	Chesapeake and Delaware, LLC
Morristown & Erie Railway	ME	
SMS Rail Lines	SLRS	
Southern Railroad of New Jersey	SRNJ	
Winchester & Western Railroad	WW	OmniTRAX

== New Mexico ==
Railroad	AAR rep. mark	Owner/Lessee
Arizona Eastern Railway	AZER	Genesee & Wyoming
Santa Fe Southern Railway	SFS	
Southwestern Railroad	SW	Jaguar Transport Holdings
Texas-New Mexico Railroad	TNMR	Watco

== New York ==
Railroad	AAR rep. mark	
Arcade & Attica Railroad	ARA	
B&H Rail Corporation	BH	
Batten Kill Railroad	BKRR	
Buffalo Southern Railroad	BSRR	
Depew, Lancaster and Western Railroad	DLWR	Genesee Valley Transportation
Falls Road Railroad	FRR	Genesee Valley Transportation
Finger Lakes Railway	FGLK	
Ithaca Central Railroad	ITHR	Watco
Livonia, Avon and Lakeville Railroad	LAL	
New York & Atlantic Railway	NYA	
Ontario Central Railroad	ONCT	
Ontario Midland Railroad	OMID	
Rochester & Southern Railroad	RSR	Genesee & Wyoming
Western New York and Pennsylvania Railroad	WNYP	

== North Carolina ==
Railroad	AAR rep. mark	Owner/Lessee
Aberdeen & Rockfish Railroad	AR	
Aberdeen, Carolina and Western Railway	ACWR	
Alexander Railroad	ARC	
Atlantic & Western Railway	ATW	Genesee & Wyoming
Caldwell County Railroad	CWCY	
Carolina Central Railway		
Carolina Coastal Railway	CLNA	Regional Rail
Great Smoky Mountains Railroad	GSMR	
Winston-Salem Southbound Railway	WSS	
Yadkin Valley Railroad	YVRR	Gulf and Ohio Railways

== North Dakota ==
Railroad	AAR rep. mark	Owner/Lessee
Dakota, Missouri Valley & Western Railroad	DMVW	
Dakota Northern Railroad	DN	Independent Locomotive Service
Mohall Central Railroad		
Northern Plains Railroad	NPR	
Red River Valley & Western Railroad	RRVW	
Rutland Line		
Yellowstone Valley Railroad	YSVR	Watco

== Ohio ==
Railroad	AAR rep. mark	
Ashland Railway	ASRY	
Camp Chase Railway	CAMY	Gulf & Atlantic Railways
Cincinnati East Terminal Railway	CET	Regional Rail
Cuyahoga Valley Scenic Railroad	CVSR	
Napoleon, Defiance & Western Railroad	ND&W	Patriot Rail Company
Ohio Central Railroad	OHCR	Genesee & Wyoming
Ohio South Central Railroad	OSCR	
Ohio Terminal Railway	OHIO	Carload Express
Ohio Valley Railroad	OVR, OVRX	
Toledo Lake Erie & Western	TLEW	

== Oklahoma ==
Railroad	AAR rep. mark	Owner/Lessee
Arkansas Southern Railroad	ARS	Watco
Blackwell Northern Gateway Railroad	BNG	
Farmrail	FMRC	
Kiamichi Railroad	KRR	Genesee & Wyoming
Northwestern Oklahoma Railroad	NOKR	
Sand Springs Railway	SS	OmniTRAX
Stillwater Central Railroad	SLWC	Watco
Texas, Oklahoma and Eastern Railroad	TOE	Patriot Rail Company
Wichita, Tillman and Jackson Railway	WTJR	Rio Grande Pacific Corporation

== Oregon ==
Railroad	AAR rep. mark	Owner/Lessee
Albany & Eastern Railroad	AERC	Rick Franklin Corp.
City of Prineville Railway	COPR	
Clackamas Valley Railroad	CVLY	Progressive Rail, Inc.
Coos Bay Rail Line	CBR	Port of Coos Bay
Goose Lake Railway	GOOS	
Idaho Northern and Pacific Railroad	INPR	Rio Grande Pacific Corporation
Klamath Northern Railway	KNOR	
Mount Hood Railroad	MH	
Oregon Eastern Railroad	OERR	Jaguar Transport Holdings
Oregon Pacific Railroad	OPR	
Palouse River & Coulee City Railroad	PCC	
Peninsula Terminal Railroad	PT	
Portland Terminal Railroad (Portland, Oregon)	PTRC	BNSF / Union Pacific
Port of Tillamook Bay Railroad	POTB	Port of Tillamook
Rogue Valley Terminal Railroad	RVT	
Wallowa Union Railroad Authority	WURR	
Willamette Valley Railway	WVR	
Wyoming & Colorado Railway (Oregon Eastern Division)	OERR	

== Pennsylvania ==
Railroad	AAR rep. mark	Owner/Lessee
Allegheny Valley Railroad	AVR	Carload Express, Inc
Bessemer & Lake Erie Railroad	BLE	
Colebrookdale Railroad	CRR	
Delaware-Lackawanna Railroad	DL	
East Penn Railroad	ESPN	Regional Rail, LLC
Everett Railroad	EV	
Middletown & Hummelstown Railroad	MIDH	
New Hope Railroad	NHRR	
Nittany and Bald Eagle Railroad	NBER	North Shore Railroad System
Pennsylvania Northeastern Railroad	PN	
Pittsburgh & Ohio Central Railroad	POHC	Genesee & Wyoming
Reading Blue Mountain & Northern Railroad	RBMN	
Shamokin Valley Railroad	SVRR	North Shore Railroad System
Strasburg Rail Road	SRC	
Tyburn Railroad	TYBR	Regional Rail, LLC

== Rhode Island ==
Railroad	AAR rep. mark	Owner/Lessee
Newport and Narragansett Bay Railroad		Savatran LLC
Seaview Transportation Company	SVTX	Savatran LLC

== South Carolina ==
Railroad	AAR rep. mark	Owner/Lessee
Carolina Piedmont Railroad	CPDR	Genesee & Wyoming
Carolina Southern Railroad	CALA	R.J. Corman Railroad Group
Greenville & Western Railway	GRLW	Western Carolina Railway Service Corporation
Hampton and Branchville Railroad	HB	Palmetto Railways
Lancaster and Chester Railroad	LC	Gulf and Ohio Railways
Palmetto Railways	PR	
Pee Dee River Railway	PDRR	Marlboro County
Pickens Railway	PICK	
South Carolina Central Railroad	SCRF	Genesee & Wyoming

== South Dakota ==
Railroad	AAR rep. mark	Owner/Lessee
Dakota Southern Railway	DSRC	
Ellis and Eastern Company	EE	Knife River Corporation
Sisseton Milbank Railroad	SMRR	Twin Cities and Western Railroad
Rapid City, Pierre and Eastern Railroad	RCPE	Genesee & Wyoming

== Tennessee ==
Railroad	AAR rep. mark	Owner/Lessee
East Tennessee Railway	ETRY	Genesee & Wyoming
Nashville & Eastern Railroad	NERR	R.J. Corman Railroad Group

== Texas ==
Railroad	AAR rep. mark	Owner/Lessee
Alamo Gulf Coast Railroad	AGCR	
Alliance Terminal Railroad	ATR	OmniTRAX
Angelina and Neches River Railroad	ANR	
Austin Western Railroad	AWRR	Watco
Blacklands Railroad	BLR	
Central Texas and Colorado River Railway	CTXR	OmniTRAX
Dallas, Garland & Northeastern Railroad	DGNO	Genesee & Wyoming
Fort Worth & Western Railroad	FWWR	
Galveston Railroad	GVSR	Genesee & Wyoming
Georgetown Railroad	GRR	
Moscow, Camden and San Augustine Railroad	MCSA	
Pecos Valley Southern Railway	PVS	Watco
Point Comfort & Northern Railway	PCN	Genesee & Wyoming
Rio Valley Switching Company	RVSC	
Sabine River and Northern Railroad	SRN	
Texas and Northern Railway	TN	Transtar, Inc.
Texas-New Mexico Railroad	TNMR	Watoc
Timber Rock Railroad	TIBR	Watco
TGS Cedar Port Railroad	TGS	TGS Cedar Port Partners

== Utah ==
Railroad	AAR rep. mark	Owner/Lessee
Salt Lake City Southern Railroad	SL	Genesee & Wyoming
Salt Lake, Garfield and Western Railway	SLGW	Patriot Rail Company
Utah Central Railway	UCRY	Patriot Rail Company
Utah Railway	UTAH	Genesee & Wyoming

== Vermont ==
Railroad	AAR rep. mark	Owner/Lessee
Vermont Railway	VTR	Vermont Agency of Transportation
New England Central Railroad	NECR	Genesee & Wyoming

== Virginia ==
Railroad	AAR rep. mark	Owner/Lessee
Buckingham Branch Railroad	BB	
Chesapeake & Albemarle Railroad	CA	Genesee & Wyoming
Commonwealth Railway	CWRY	Genesee & Wyoming
Delmarva Central Railroad	DCR	Carload Express, Inc.
Durbin and Greenbrier Valley Railroad	DGVR	
North Carolina & Virginia Railroad	NCVA	Genesee & Wyoming
Shenandoah Valley Railroad	SV	
Winchester & Western Railroad	WW	OmniTRAX
Virginia Southern Railroad	VSSRR	

== Washington ==
Railroad	AAR rep. mark	Owner/Lessee
Ballard Terminal Railroad	BDTL	
Cascade & Columbia River Railroad	CSCD	Genesee & Wyoming
Central Washington Railroad	CWRR	Jaguar Transport Holdings
Columbia and Cowlitz Railway	CLC	Patriot Rail Company
Columbia Basin Railroad	CBRR	Jaguar Transport Holdings
Great Northwest Railroad	GRNW	Watco
Kettle Falls International Railway	KFR	OmniTRAX
Lewis and Clark Railway	LINC	
Meeker Southern Railroad	MSN	
Mount Vernon Terminal Railroad	MVT	
Olympia & Belmore Railroad	OYLO	Genesee & Wyoming
Puget Sound & Pacific Railroad	PSAP	Genesee & Wyoming
Spokane Spangle & Palouse Railway	SSP	
St. Paul & Pacific Northwest Railroad	STPP	Progressive Rail, Inc.
Tacoma Rail	TMRW	
Tri-City Railroad	TCRY	
Washington Eastern Railroad	WERR	Jaguar Transport Holdings

== West Virginia ==
Railroad	AAR rep. mark	Owner/Lessee
Big Eagle Railroad	BER	

== Wisconsin ==
Railroad	AAR rep. mark	Owner/Lessee
East Troy Electric Railroad	ETER	
Tomahawk Railway	TR	Genesee & Wyoming

== Wyoming ==
Railroad	AAR rep. mark	Owner/Lessee
Bighorn Divide and Wyoming Railroad	BDW	
Swan Ranch Railroad	SRRR	Watco

== Interstate ==
Railroad	AAR rep. mark	Owner/Lessee
Bay Line Railroad (AL and FL)	BAYL	Genesee & Wyoming
Chicago, Fort Wayne & Eastern Railroad	CFE	Genesee & Wyoming
Chicago South Shore & South Bend Railroad (IL and IN)	CSS	
Cimarron Valley Railroad (CO, KS, and OK)	CVR	
Deseret Power Railroad (CO and UT)	DPRW	
Rail Link (operates 26 short line railroads)	RLIX	
Housatonic Railroad (HRRC) (CT, MA, NY)	HRRC	
Idaho Northern & Pacific Railroad (ID and OR)	INPR	
Kankakee, Beaverville and Southern Railroad (IL and IN)	KBSR	
New York New Jersey Rail (NJ and NY)	NYNJ	
Pend Oreille Valley Railroad (ID and WA)	POVA	
St Lawrence & Atlantic Railroad (ME, NH, and VT)	SLA	Genesee & Wyoming
Utah Railway (CO and UT)	UTAH	Genesee & Wyoming
Watco (owners of 45 short lines)	WATX, WAMX	
Wichita, Tillman and Jackson Railway (OK and TX)	WTJR	
