= List of common carrier freight railroads in the United States =

About 700 railroads operate common carrier freight service in the United States. There are about 160,141 mi (257,722 km) of railroad track in the United States, nearly all standard gauge.

Reporting marks are listed in parentheses.

- A&R Terminal Railroad (ART)
- Aberdeen and Rockfish Railroad (AR)
- Aberdeen, Carolina and Western Railway (ACWR)
- Acadiana Railway (AKDN)
- Adams-Warnock Railway (AWRY)
- Adrian and Blissfield Rail Road (ADBF)
- Affton Terminal Services Railroad (AT)
- Ag Valley Railroad (AVRR)
- Aiken Railway (AIKR)
- Akron Barberton Cluster Railway (AB)
- Alabama and Gulf Coast Railway (AGR) (GWI)
- Alabama and Tennessee River Railway (ATN) (OmniTRAX)
- Alabama Export Railroad (ALE)
- Alabama Southern Railroad (ABS)
- Alabama Warrior Railway (ABWR)
- Alamo Gulf Coast Railroad (AGCR)
- Alamo North Texas Railroad (ANTX)
- Alaska Railroad (ARR)
- Albany and Eastern Railroad (AERC)
- Albany Port Railroad (APD)
- Alexander Railroad (ARC)
- Aliquippa and Ohio River Railroad (AOR)
- Allegheny Valley Railroad (AVR)
- Allentown and Auburn Railroad (ALLN)
- Alton and Southern Railway (ALS)
- AN Railway (AN)
- Angelina and Neches River Railroad (ANR)
- Ann Arbor Railroad (AA)
- Apache Railway (APA)
- Appalachian and Ohio Railroad (AO)
- Arcade and Attica Railroad (ARA)
- Arizona and California Railroad (ARZC)
- Arizona Central Railroad (AZCR)
- Arizona Eastern Railway (AZER)
- Arkansas–Oklahoma Railroad (AOK)
- Arkansas and Missouri Railroad (AM)
- Arkansas Midland Railroad (AKMD) (GWI)
- Arkansas Southern Railroad (ARS) (Watco)
- Arkansas, Louisiana and Mississippi Railroad (ALM) (GWI)
- Ashland Railway (ASRY)
- Ashtabula, Carson and Jefferson Railroad (ACJR)
- AT&L Railroad (ATLT)
- Atlantic and Western Railway (ATW) (GWI)
- Atlantic Railways (ATL)
- Austin Western Railroad (AWRR) (Watco)
- Autauga Northern Railroad (AUT) (Watco)
- B&H Rail Corporation (BH)
- Baja California Railroad (BJRR)
- Ballard Terminal Railroad (BDTL)
- Baton Rouge Southern Railroad (BRS) (Watco)
- Batten Kill Railroad (BKRR)
- Bauxite and Northern Railway (BXN) (GWI)
- Bay Colony Railroad (BCLR)
- Bay Line Railroad (BAYL) (GWI)
- Bayway Terminal Switching Company (BAWT)
- Beech Mountain Railroad (BEEM)
- Bee Line Railroad (BLEX)
- Bellingham International Railroad (BIRR)
- Belt Railway of Chicago (BRC)
- Belvidere and Delaware River Railway (BDRV)
- Bessemer and Lake Erie Railroad (BLE)
- BG&CM Railroad (BGCM)
- Big 4 Terminal Railroad (BFT)
- Big Spring Rail System (BSR)
- Bighorn Divide and Wyoming Railroad (BDW)
- Birmingham Terminal Railway (BHRR)
- Belpre Industrial Parkersburg Railroad (BIP)
- Black River and Western Corporation (BRW)
- Blacklands Railroad (BLR)
- Blackwell Northern Gateway Railroad (BNG)
- Bloomer Line (BLOL)
- Blue Rapids Railway (BLRR)
- Blue Ridge Southern Railroad (BLU)
- BNSF Railway (BNSF)
- Bogalusa & Northern Railway (BNR)
- Boise Valley Railroad (BVRR)
- Boone and Scenic Valley Railroad (BSVY)
- Border Pacific Railroad (BOP)
- Brandywine Valley Railroad (BVRY)
- Branford Steam Railroad (BRFD)
- Bridgeport Switching Company (BPSC)
- Brownsville and Rio Grande International Railroad (BRG)
- Buckingham Branch Railroad (BB)
- Bucyrus Industrial Railroad (BIR)
- Buffalo and Pittsburgh Railroad (BPRR)
- Buffalo Southern Railroad (BSOR)
- Burlington Junction Railway (BJRY)
- Burns Harbor Shortline Railroad (BHS)
- Butte, Anaconda and Pacific Railway (BAP)
- Caldwell County Railroad (CWCY)
- California Northern Railroad (CFNR)
- Camden and Southern Railroad (CSR)
- Camp Chase Railway (CAMY)
- Canadian National Railway (CN)
- Caney Fork and Western Railroad (CFWR)
- Cando Tooele Railroad
- Canton Railroad (CTN)
- Cape Fear Railways (CF)
- Cape May Seashore Lines (CMSL)
- Carolina Coastal Railway (CLNA)
- Carolina Piedmont Railroad (CPDR)
- Cascade and Columbia River Railroad (CSCD)
- CaterParrott Railnet (CPR)
- Cedar Rapids and Iowa City Railway (CIC)
- Central California Traction Company (CCT)
- Central Indiana and Western Railroad (CEIW)
- Central Montana Rail, Inc. (CM)
- Central New England Railroad (CNZR)
- Central New York Railroad (CNYK)
- Central Oregon and Pacific Railroad (CORP)
- Central Railroad of Indiana (CIND) (GWRR)
- Central Railroad of Indianapolis (CERA)
- Central Washington Railroad (CWRR)
- CGB Shortline Railroad (CGRX)
- CG Railway (CGR)
- Charlotte Southern Railroad (CHS)
- Charlotte Western Railroad (CER)
- Chattahoochee Industrial Railroad (CIRR)
- Chattooga and Chickamauga Railway (CCKY)
- Chesapeake and Albemarle Railroad (CA)
- Chesapeake and Indiana Railroad (CKIN)
- Chessie Logistics (CLCY)
- Chestnut Ridge Railroad (CHR)
- Chicago–Chemung Railroad (CCUO)
- Chicago Junction Railway (CJRY)
- Chicago Port & Rail (CPRL)
- Chicago Port Railroad (CPC)
- Chicago Rail Link (CRL)
- Chicago South Shore and South Bend Railroad (CSS)
- Chicago, Fort Wayne and Eastern Railroad (CFE)
- Chicago, St. Paul & Pacific Railroad (CSP)
- Cicero Central Railroad (CECR)
- Cimarron Valley Railroad (CVR)
- Cincinnati Eastern Railroad (CCET)
- City of Prineville Railway (COP)
- Clackamas Valley Railroad (CVLY)
- Clarendon and Pittsford Railroad (CLP)
- Cleveland and Cuyahoga Railroad (CCRL)
- Cleveland Port Railroad (CHB)
- Cleveland Terminal & Valley Railroad (CTV)
- Cleveland Works Railway (CWRO)
- Clinton Terminal Railroad (CTR)
- Cloquet Terminal Railroad (CTRR)
- CMC Railroad (CMC)
- Colorado Pacific Railroad (CXR)
- Colorado Pacific Rio Grande Railroad (CXRG)
- Coffeen and Western Railroad (CAEG)
- Colorado and Wyoming Railway (CW)
- Columbia and Cowlitz Railway (CLC)
- Columbia Basin Railroad (CBRW)
- Columbia Shipyards Railroad (CSBP)
- Columbia Terminal Railroad (CT)
- Columbia-Walla Walla Railway (CWW)
- Columbus and Chattahoochee Railroad (CCH)
- Columbus and Greenville Railway (CAGY)
- Columbus and Ohio River Rail Road (CUOH)
- Commonwealth Railway (CWRY)
- Conecuh Valley Railroad (COEH)
- Connecticut Southern Railroad (CSOR)
- Coopersville and Marne Railway (CPMY)
- Coos Bay Rail Link (CBRL)
- Copper Basin Railway (CBRY)
- Cornhusker Railroad (CNRR)
- CPKC Railway (CPKC)
- Crab Orchard and Egyptian Railway (COER)
- CSX Transportation (CSXT)
- D&I Railroad (DAIR)
- D&W Railroad (DWRV)
- Dakota Northern Railroad (DN)
- Dakota Southern Railway (DSRC)
- Dakota, Missouri Valley and Western Railroad (DMVW)
- Dallas, Garland and Northeastern Railroad (DGNO)
- Dardanelle and Russellville Railroad (DR)
- Davenport Industrial Railroad (DIR)
- De Queen and Eastern Railroad (DQE)
- Decatur & Eastern Illinois Railroad (DREI)
- Decatur Junction Railway (DT)
- Delaware and Raritan River Railroad (DRRR)
- Delaware–Lackawanna Railroad (DL)
- Delray Connecting Railroad (DC)
- Delmarva Central Railroad (DCR)
- Delta Southern Railroad (DSRR)
- Delta Valley and Southern Railway (DVS)
- Denver Rock Island Railroad (DRIR)
- Depew, Lancaster and Western Railroad (DLWR)
- Deseret Power Railroad (DPRW)
- Detroit Connecting Railroad (DCON)
- DFW & Southern Railway (DFWS)
- Dover and Delaware River Railroad (DD)
- Dover & Rockaway River Railroad (DRRV)
- Drake Switching Company (DSC)
- Dubois County Railroad (DCRR)
- Dutchtown Southern Railroad (DUSR)
- East Brookfield and Spencer Railroad (EBSR)
- East Camden and Highland Railroad (EACH)
- East Chicago Rail Terminal (ECRT)
- East Cooper and Berkeley Railroad (ECBR)
- East Erie Commercial Railroad (EEC)
- East Jersey Railroad (EJR)
- East Ohio Valley Railway (EOVR)
- East Penn Railroad (ESPN)
- East Tennessee Railway (ETRY)
- East Terminal Railway (ECTR)
- East Troy Electric Railroad (METW)
- Eastern Alabama Railway (EARY)
- Eastern Idaho Railroad (EIRR)
- Eastern Kentucky Railway Company (EKRC)
- Eastern Maine Railway (EMRY)
- Effingham Railroad (EFRR)
- El Dorado and Wesson Railway (EDW)
- Elizabethtown Industrial Railroad (EZR)
- Elkhart and Western Railroad (EWR)
- Ellis and Eastern Company (EE)
- Elwood, Joliet & Southern Railroad (EJSR)
- Escanaba and Lake Superior Railroad (ELS)
- Evansville Western Railway (EVWR)
- Everett Railroad (EV)
- Fairfield Southern Company (FS)
- Falls Road Railroad (FRR)
- Farmrail Corporation (FMRC)
- FFG&C Railroad (FFGC)
- Finger Lakes Railway (FGLK)
- First Coast Railroad (FCRD)
- Flats Industrial Railroad (FIR)
- Florida Central Railroad (FCEN)
- Florida East Coast Railway (FEC)
- Florida Gulf & Atlantic Railroad (FGAR)
- Florida Midland Railroad (FMID)
- Florida Northern Railroad (FNOR)
- Fore River Transportation Corporation (FRVT)
- Fort Smith Railroad (FSR)
- Fort Worth and Western Railroad (FWWR)
- Fox Valley & Lake Superior Rail System (FOXY)
- Fredonia Valley Railroad (FVRR)
- Fulton County Railroad (FC)
- Fulton County Railway (FCR)
- Galveston Railroad (GVSR)
- Garden City Western Railway (GCW)
- Gardendale Railroad (GRD)
- Gary Railway (GRW)
- Gateway Industrial Railroad (GIRR)
- Geaux Geaux Railroad (GOGR)
- Georgetown Railroad (GRR)
- Georgia and Florida Railway (GFRR)
- Georgia Central Railway (GC)
- Georgia Northeastern Railroad (GNRR)
- Georgia Southern Railway (GS)
- Georgia Southwestern Railroad (GSWR)
- Georgia Woodlands Railroad (GWRC)
- Gettysburg and Northern Railroad (GET)
- GG Railroad (GGRR)
- Golden Isles Terminal Railroad (GITM)
- Golden Triangle Railroad (GTRA)
- Goose Lake Railway (GLRY)
- Grafton and Upton Railroad (GU)
- Grainbelt Corporation (GNBC)
- Grand Elk Railroad (GDLK)
- Grand Rapids Eastern Railroad (GR)
- Grand River Railway (GRRL)
- Great Basin & Northern Railroad (GBN)
- Great Lakes Central Railroad (GLC)
- Great Northwest Railroad (GRNW)
- Great Walton Railroad (GRWR)
- Great Western Railway of Colorado (GWR)
- Green Mountain Railroad (GMRC)
- Greenville and Western Railway (GRLW)
- Grenada Railway (GRYR)
- Gulf & Ship Island Railroad (GSIR)
- Gulf Coast Switching (GCSX)
- Hainesport Secondary Railroad (HSCR)
- Hamilton Northwestern Railroad (HNW)
- Hampton and Branchville Railroad (HB)
- Hartwell Railroad (HRT)
- Heart of Georgia Railroad (HOG)
- Heritage Railroad (HR)
- Herrin Railroad (HRRL)
- Hilton & Albany Railroad (HAL)
- Hondo Railway (HRR)
- Hood River Railroad (DBA Mount Hood Railroad) (MH)
- Hoosier Southern Railroad (HOS)
- Housatonic Railroad (HRRC)
- Huntsville and Madison County Railroad Authority (HMCR)
- Huron and Eastern Railway (HESR)
- Hussey Terminal Railroad (HTRC)
- Idaho Northern and Pacific Railroad (INPR)
- Illinois and Midland Railroad (IMRR)
- Illinois Railway (IR)
- Illinois Western Railroad (ILW)
- Indiana and Ohio Railway (IORY)
- Indiana Eastern Railroad (IERR)
- Indiana Harbor Belt Railroad (IHB)
- Indiana Northeastern Railroad (IN)
- Indiana Rail Road (INRD)
- Indiana Southern Railroad (ISRR)
- Indiana Southwestern Railway (ISW)
- Illinois Terminal Belt Railroad (ITB)
- Iowa Interstate Railroad (IAIS)
- Iowa Northern Railway (IANR)
- Iowa River Railroad (IARR)
- Iowa Southern Railway (ISRY)
- Iowa Traction Railroad (IATR)
- Itawamba Mississippian Railway (IMR)
- Ithaca Central Railroad (ITHR)
- Jackson & Lansing Railroad (JAIL)
- Jacksonville Port Terminal Railroad (JXPT)
- Joppa and Eastern Railroad (JE)
- Juniata Valley Railroad (JVRR)
- Kanawha River Railroad (KNWA)
- Kankakee, Beaverville and Southern Railroad (KBSR)
- Kansas and Oklahoma Railroad (KO)
- Kansas City Transportation Lines (KCTL)
- Kaw River Railroad (KAW)
- Kendallville Terminal Railway (KTR)
- Kennewick Terminal Railroad (KET)
- Kentucky and Tennessee Railway (KT)
- Keokuk Junction Railway (KJRY)
- Kiamichi Railroad (KRR)
- Kingman Terminal Railroad (KGTR)
- Kinston Railroad (KR)
- Klamath Northern Railway (KNOR)
- KM Railways (KM)
- Knoxville and Cumberland Gap Railroad (KXCG)
- Knoxville and Holston River Railroad (KXHR)
- KS Railroad (KSRR)
- KWT Railway (KWT)
- Kyle Railroad (KYLE)
- Lake Michigan and Indiana Railroad (LMIC)
- Lake State Railway (LSRC)
- Lake Superior and Ishpeming Railroad (LSI)
- Lake Terminal Railroad (LT)
- Lancaster and Chester Railway (LC)
- LVR Railroad (LVR)
- Lapeer Industrial Railroad (LIRR)
- LaSalle Railway (LSRY)
- Laurinburg and Southern Railroad (LRS)
- Lehigh Valley Rail Management (LVRM)
- Little Kanawha River Railroad (LKRR)
- Little Rock and Western Railway (LRWN)
- Little Rock Port Authority Railroad (LRPA)
- Live Oak Railroad (LOR)
- Livonia, Avon and Lakeville Railroad (LAL)
- Longview Switching Company (LVSW)
- Louisiana and Delta Railroad (LDRR)
- Louisiana and North West Railroad (LNW)
- Louisiana Southern Railroad (LAS)
- Louisville and Indiana Railroad (LIRC)
- Lubbock and Western Railway (LBWR)
- Lucas Oil Rail Lines (LORL)
- Luxapalila Valley Railroad (LXVR)
- Lycoming Valley Railroad (LVRR)
- M&B Railroad (MNBR)
- Madison Railroad (CMPA)
- Mahoning Valley Railway (MVRY)
- Maine Northern Railway (MNRY)
- Manning Rail (MANN)
- Manufacturers' Junction Railway (MJ)
- Marquette Rail, LLC (MQT)
- Maryland and Delaware Railroad (MDDE)
- Maryland Midland Railway (MMID)
- Massachusetts Central Railroad (MCER)
- Massachusetts Coastal Railroad (MC)
- Massena Terminal Railroad (MSTR)
- McKees Rocks Railroad (PAM)
- Meeker Southern Railroad (MSN)
- Merced County Central Valley Railroad (MCVR)
- Meridian Southern Railway (MDS)
- MG Rail, Inc. (MGRI)
- Michigan Shore Railroad (MS)
- Michigan Southern Railroad (MSO)
- Midcoast Railservice (FGLK)
- Mid-Michigan Railroad (MMRR)
- Middletown and Hummelstown Railroad (MIDH)
- Middletown and New Jersey Railroad (MNJ)
- Midway Southern Railway (MWS)
- Milford-Bennington Railroad (MBRX)
- Mineral Range Railroad (MRAX)
- Minnesota Commercial Railway (MNNR)
- Minnesota Northern Railroad (MNN)
- Minnesota Prairie Line, Inc. (MPLI)
- Minnesota, Dakota and Western Railway (MDW)
- Mission Mountain Railroad (MMT)
- Mississippi Central Railroad (MSCI)
- Mississippi Delta Railroad (MSDR)
- Mississippi Export Railroad (MSE)
- Mississippi Southern Railroad (MSR)
- Mississippi Tennessee Railroad (MTNR)
- Missouri and Northern Arkansas Railroad (MNA)
- Missouri Eastern Railroad (MER)
- Missouri North Central Railroad (MNC)
- Modesto and Empire Traction Company (MET)
- Mohawk, Adirondack and Northern Railroad (MHWA)
- Morristown and Erie Railway (ME)
- Moscow, Camden and San Augustine Railroad (MCSA)
- Mountain Pacific Railroad (MPR)
- Mount Vernon Terminal Railway (MVT)
- Napoleon, Defiance & Western Railway (NDW)
- Natchez Railway (NTZR)
- Naugatuck Railroad Company (NAUG)
- Northampton Switching Company (NDCR)
- Nebraska Central Railroad (NCRC)
- Nebraska Kansas Colorado Railway (NKCR)
- Nebraska Northwestern Railroad (NNW)
- New Castle Industrial Railroad (NCIR)
- New Castle Southern Railroad (NCSR)
- New Century AirCenter Railroad (JCAX)
- New England Central Railroad (NECR)
- New England Southern Railroad (NEGS)
- New Hampshire Central Railroad (NHCR)
- New Hampshire Northcoast Corporation (NHN)
- New Hope and Ivyland Railroad (NHRR)
- New Jersey Rail Carriers, LLC (NJRC)
- New Jersey Seashore Lines (NJSL)
- New Orleans and Gulf Coast Railway (NOGC)
- New Orleans Public Belt Railroad (NOPB)
- New York and Atlantic Railway (NYA)
- New York and Lake Erie Railroad (NYLE)
- New York and Ogdensburg Railway (NYOG)
- New York New Jersey Rail, LLC (NYNJ)
- New York, Susquehanna and Western Railway (NYSW)
- Newburgh and South Shore Railroad (NSR)
- Nittany and Bald Eagle Railroad (NBER)
- Norfolk and Portsmouth Belt Line Railroad (NPB)
- Norfolk Southern Railway (NS)
- North Carolina and Virginia Railroad (NCVA)
- North Louisiana & Arkansas Railroad (NLA)
- North Shore Railroad (NSHR)
- Northeast Texas Connector (NETC)
- Northern Lines Railway (NLR)
- Northern Ohio and Western Railway (NOW)
- Northern Plains Railroad (NPR)
- Northwestern Oklahoma Railroad (NOKL)
- Oakland Global Rail Enterprise (OGRE)
- Ogeechee Railway (ORC)
- Ohio Central Railroad (OHCR)
- Ohio South Central Railroad (OSCR)
- Ohio Southern Railroad (OSRR)
- Oil Creek and Titusville Lines, Inc. (OCTL)
- Old Augusta Railroad (OAR)
- Olympia and Belmore Railroad (OLYO)
- Omaha, Lincoln and Beatrice Railway (OLB)
- Ontario Central Railroad (ONCT)
- Ontario Midland Railroad (OMID)
- Orange Port Terminal Railway (OPT)
- Oregon Eastern Railroad (OERR)
- Oregon Independence Railroad (OIRR)
- Oregon Pacific Railroad (OPR)
- Ottawa Northern Railroad (ONR)
- Otter Tail Valley Railroad (OTVR)
- Ouachita Railroad (OUCH)
- Ozark Valley Railroad (OVRR)
- Pacific Harbor Line, Inc. (PHL)
- Paducah and Louisville Railway (PAL)
- Palouse River and Coulee City Railroad (PCC)
- Palmetto Railways (PR)
- Panhandle Northern Railroad (PNR)
- Pecos Valley Southern Railway (PVS)
- Pee Dee River Railway (PDRR)
- Pend Oreille Valley Railroad (POVA)
- Peninsula Terminal Company (PT)
- Pennsylvania and Southern Railway (PSCC)
- Pennsylvania Southwestern Railroad (PSWR)
- Perry County Railroad (PCYR)
- Peru Industrial Railroad (PIRR)
- Pickens Railway (PICK)
- Pioneer Industrial Railroad (PRY)
- Pioneer Valley Railroad (PVRR)
- Pittsburgh and Ohio Central Railroad (POHC)
- Plainsman Switching Company (PSC)
- Plainview Terminal Company (PTM)
- Point Comfort and Northern Railway (PCN)
- Port of Catoosa Industrial Railroad (PCIR)
- Port Bienville Railroad (PBVR)
- Port Harbor Railroad (PHRR)
- Port Liberty Container Terminal ExpressRail (PLCT)
- Port Jersey Railroad (PJR)
- Port Manatee Railroad (PMR)
- Port Rail, Inc (PRI)
- Port Terminal Railroad Association (PTRA)
- Port Terminal Railroad of South Carolina (PTR)
- Portland and Western Railroad (PNWR)
- Portland Terminal Railroad (PTRC)
- Portland Vancouver Junction Railroad (PVJR)
- Prescott and Northwestern Railroad (PNW)
- Progressive Rail, Inc. (PGR)
- Providence and Worcester Railroad (PW)
- Puget Sound and Pacific Railroad (PSAP)
- Quincy Railroad (QRR)
- Rainer Rail (RR)
- Raleigh and Fayetteville Railroad (RFCC)
- Rawhide Short Line (RHSL)
- R.J. Corman Railroad/Allentown Lines (RJCN)
- R.J. Corman Railroad/Bardstown Line (RJCR)
- R.J. Corman Railroad/Carolina Line (RJCA)
- R.J. Corman Railroad/Central Kentucky Lines (RJCC)
- R.J. Corman Railroad/Cleveland Line (RJCL)
- R.J. Corman Railroad/Lehigh Line (LRWY)
- R.J. Corman Railroad/Luzerne & Susquehanna Line (LS)
- R.J. Corman Railroad/Memphis Line (RJCM)
- R.J. Corman Railroad/Nashville & Eastern Line (NERR)
- R.J. Corman Railroad/Nashville & Western Line (NWR)
- R.J. Corman Railroad/Owego & Harford Line (OHRY)
- R.J. Corman Railroad/Pennsylvania Lines (RJCP)
- R.J. Corman Railroad/Tennessee Terminal (RJCK)
- R.J. Corman Railroad/Texas Lines (RJCD)
- R.J. Corman Railroad/West Virginia Line (RJCV)
- R.J. Corman Railroad/Western Ohio Lines (RJCW)
- Rapid City, Pierre and Eastern Railroad (RCPE)
- Raritan Central Railway (RCRY)
- Reading Blue Mountain and Northern Railroad (RBMN)
- Red River Valley and Western Railroad (RRVW)
- Republic N&T Railroad (NTRY)
- Riceboro Southern Railway (RSOR)
- Richmond Pacific Railroad (RPRC)
- Ringneck and Western Railroad (RWRR)
- Rio Valley Switching Company (RVSC)
- Ripley & New Albany Railroad (RNAB)
- River Ridge Railroad (RRR)
- Riverport Railroad (RVPR)
- Rochester and Erie Railroad (RER)
- Rochester and Southern Railroad (RSR)
- Rochester Switching Services (RSS)
- Rock & Rail LLC (RRRR)
- Rogue Valley Terminal Railroad Corporation (RVT)
- Republic Short Line (RSL)
- S&L Railroad (SLGG)
- Sabine River and Northern Railroad (SRN)
- Sacramento Southern Railroad (SSRR)
- Sacramento Valley Railroad (SAV)
- Salt Lake, Garfield and Western Railway (SLGW)
- San Antonio Central Railroad (SAC)
- San Diego and Imperial Valley Railroad (SDIY)
- San Francisco Bay Railway (SFBR)
- San Joaquin Valley Railroad (SJVR)
- San Manuel Arizona Railroad (SMA)
- San Luis Central Railroad (SLC)
- San Pedro Valley Railroad (SPVR)
- Santa Teresa Southern Railroad (STSR)
- Sand Springs Railway (SS)
- Sandersville Railroad (SAN)
- Santa Cruz, Big Trees and Pacific Railway (SCBG)
- Santa Maria Valley Railroad (SMV)
- Savage Bingham and Garfield Railroad (SBG)
- Savannah and Old Fort Railroad (SVHO)
- Savannah Industrial Transportation (SIT)
- Savannah Port Terminal Railroad (SAPT)
- Seaview Railroad (SVTX)
- Seminole Gulf Railway (SGLR)
- SEMO Port Railroad (SE)
- Sequatchie Valley Switching Company (SQSC)
- Shamokin Valley Railroad (SVRR)
- Shenandoah Valley Railroad (SV)
- Sierra Northern Railway (SERA)
- Sisseton Milbank Railroad (SMRR)
- SJRE Railroad (SJRE)
- SMS Rail Service, Inc. (SLRS)
- Spokane, Spangle & Palouse Railway (SSPR)
- South Branch Valley Railroad (SBVR)
- South Buffalo Railway (SB)
- South Carolina Central Railroad (SCRF)
- South Central Florida Express, Inc. (SCXF)
- South Central Tennessee Railroad (SCTR)
- South Chicago and Indiana Harbor Railway (SCIH)
- South Kansas and Oklahoma Railroad (SKOL)
- South Plains Lamesa Railroad (SLAL)
- South Point and Ohio Railroad (SPOR)
- Southern Electric Railroad Company (SERC)
- Southern Railroad of New Jersey (SRNJ)
- Southern Switching Company (SSC)
- Southwest Gulf Railroad (SWG)
- Southwest Pennsylvania Railroad (SWP)
- Southwestern Railroad (SW)
- Squaw Creek Southern Railroad (SCS)
- St. Croix Valley Railroad (SCXY)
- St. Lawrence and Atlantic Railroad (SLR)
- St. Maries River Railroad (STMA)
- St. Marys Railroad (SM)
- St. Marys Railway West (SMW)
- Stillwater Central Railroad (SLWC)
- St. Paul and Pacific Northwest Railroad (SPPN)
- St. Paul and Pacific Railroad (SPPR)
- Stockton Terminal and Eastern Railroad (STE)
- Stourbridge Railroad (SBRR)
- Strasburg Rail Road (SRC)
- Swan Ranch Railroad (SRRR)
- Tacoma Rail (TMBL)
- Tazewell and Peoria Railroad (TZPR)
- Temple and Central Texas Railway (TC)
- Tennessee Southern Railroad (TSRR)
- Tennken Railroad (TKEN)
- Terminal Railroad Association of St. Louis (TRRA)
- Terminal Railway Alabama State Docks (TASD)
- Texas & New Mexico Railroad (TXN)
- Texas and Eastern Railroad (TESR)
- Texas and Northern Railway (TN)
- Texas and Oklahoma Railroad (TXOR)
- Texas Central Business Lines Corporation (TCB)
- Texas City Terminal Railway (TCT)
- Texas Coastal Bend Railroad (TCBR)
- Texas North Western Railway (TXNW)
- Texas Northeastern Railroad (TNER)
- Texas Pacifico Transportation (TXPF)
- Texas Rock Crusher Railway (TXR)
- Texas, Gonzales and Northern Railway (TXGN)
- Thermal Belt Railway (TBRY)
- Three Notch Railroad (TNHR)
- Timber Rock Railroad (TIBR)
- Toledo Industrial Railroad (TIR)
- Toledo Junction Railroad (TJR)
- Toledo, Peoria and Western Railway (TPW)
- Tomahawk Railway (TR)
- Tradepoint Rail (TPR)
- Trona Railway (TRC)
- Tulsa–Sapulpa Union Railway (TSU)
- Turners Island, LLC (TI)
- Twin Cities and Western Railroad (TCWR)
- Tyburn Railroad (TYBR)
- Tyner Terminal Railway (TYNT)
- Union City Terminal Railroad (UCTR)
- Union County Industrial Railroad (UCIR)
- Union Pacific Railroad (UP)
- Union Railroad (URR)
- Upper Merion and Plymouth Railroad (UMP)
- Utah Railway (UTAH)
- Utah Central Railway (UCRY)
- V&S Railway (VSR)
- Valdosta Railway (VR)
- Vandalia Railroad (VRRC)
- Ventura County Railroad (VCRR)
- Vermilion Valley Railroad (VVRR)
- Vermont Railway (VTR)
- Vicksburg Southern Railroad (VSOR)
- Virginia Southern Railroad (VSRR)
- Wabash Central Railroad (WBCR)
- Walking Horse Railroad (WHRR)
- Wallowa Union Railroad Authority (WURR)
- Warren and Saline River Railroad (WSR)
- Warren and Trumbull Railroad (WTRM)
- Washington County Railroad (WACR)
- Washington Eastern Railroad (WERR)
- Washington Royal Line (WRL)
- Wellsboro and Corning Railroad (WCOR)
- West Belt Railway (WBRW)
- West Isle Line (WFS)
- West Michigan Railroad (WMI)
- West Tennessee Railroad (WTNN)
- Western Maryland Scenic Railroad (WMSR)
- Western New York and Pennsylvania Railroad (WNYP)
- Western Rail Road (WRRC)
- Wheeling and Lake Erie Railway (WE)
- Wichita Terminal Association (WTA)
- Wichita, Tillman and Jackson Railway (WTJR)
- Willamette Valley Railway (WVR)
- Wilmington Terminal Railroad (WTRY)
- Wilmington and Western Railroad (WWRC)
- Winchester and Western Railroad (WW)
- Winston-Salem Southbound Railway (WSS)
- Wiregrass Central Railroad (WGCR)
- Wisconsin and Southern Railroad (WSOR)
- Wisconsin Great Northern Railroad (WGNS)
- Wisconsin Northern Railroad (WN)
- Wolf Creek Railroad (WCKR)
- Yak Rail, LLC (YCR)
- Yadkin Valley Railroad (YVRR)
- Yellowstone Valley Railroad (YSVR)
- York Railway (YRC)
- Youngstown and Austintown Railroad (YARR)
- Youngstown and Southeastern Railroad (YSRR)
- Youngstown Belt Railroad (YB)
- Yreka Western Railroad (YW)
- Zemba Rail Services (ZEMBA)

== See also ==
- List of Canadian railways
- Reporting mark
- List of defunct railroads of North America
- Narrow gauge railroads in the United States
- List of U.S. Class I railroads
- Transportation in the United States
- Oldest railroads in North America
