= Pacific Sun Railroad =

Defunct shortline railroad

Overview
- Fleet: 4 locomotives; see #Equipment
- Parent company: Watco
- Headquarters: Stuart Mesa Yard
- Locale: San Diego County, California
- Dates of operation: 2008–2020
- Predecessor: BNSF Railway
- Successor: BNSF Railway

Technical
- Track gauge: 1,435 mm (4 ft 8 1/2 in)

Other
- Website: Official website (archived)

Pacific Sun Railroad was a shortline railroad in San Diego County, California, that worked on the Escondido Subdivision, the Miramar Branch, and in Stuart Mesa Yard. It was based out of Stuart Mesa Yard in Oceanside. It was owned by Watco.

== History ==
The Pacific Sun Railroad commenced operations on October 25, 2008, after being contracted by BNSF. As of October 1, 2020, the Pacific Sun Railroad's contract with BNSF expired and BNSF will once again run local freight operations on the NCTD Escondido Sub and the Miramar Branch off the NCTD San Diego Subdivision.

== Operations ==
Pacific Sun Railroad ran trains weekdays late at night along the North County Transit District's Escondido Subdivision, between Oceanside and Escondido, and the Miramar Spur off of the NCTD San Diego Subdivision.

=== Equipment ===
Pacific Sun used four locomotives. Two EMD GP35 units originally owned by Seaboard Air Line, and two EMD GP40 units originally owned by Western Pacific Railroad.
