= Fox Valley and Lake Superior =

Railroad in Wisconsin and Michigan

Fox Valley & Lake Superior
Overview
- Parent company: Watco
- Reporting mark: FOXY
- Locale: Wisconsin
- Dates of operation: 2022–
- Predecessor: CN Rail

Technical
- Length: 521.75 mi (839.68 km)

Other
- Website: www.watco.com/service/fox-valley-and-lake-superior-foxy/

Fox Valley & Lake Superior Rail System, filed a notice on December 31, 2021, to acquire and operate approximately 328.52 miles (528.70 km) of active rail lines and 180.75 miles (290.89 km) of rail line over which discontinuance of service previously had been authorized, totaling approximately 509.27 miles (819.59 km). These lines were owned by Wisconsin Central Ltd. (WCL), the American subsidiary of CN Rail.

When the sale was concluded it ended up being 521.75 miles (839.68 km) of former Canadian National (WCL) track.

== CN interchange points ==
- Green Bay to Denmark, about 16 miles (26 km).
- Green Bay to Luxemburg, about 17 miles (27 km).
- Appleton to Shawano, about 44 miles (71 km).
- Appleton to New London, about 19 miles (31 km).
- Appleton to Kaukauna, about 8 miles (13 km).
- Spencer to Medford, about 28 miles (45 km). (currently inactive).
- Rothschild (interchange with Wisconsin Public Service) via Tomahawk (interchange with Tomahawk Railway), Bradley (branch to Rhinelander) and Prentice to Park Falls, a total of about 137 miles (220 km)

== Industrial development sites ==
- Appleton
- Appleton II
- Greenville
- McCarthy-Appleton
- Merrill
- Park Falls
- Wausau
- Wausau 13

== See also ==
- List of Wisconsin railroads
