= Watco =

Transportation company in Kansas

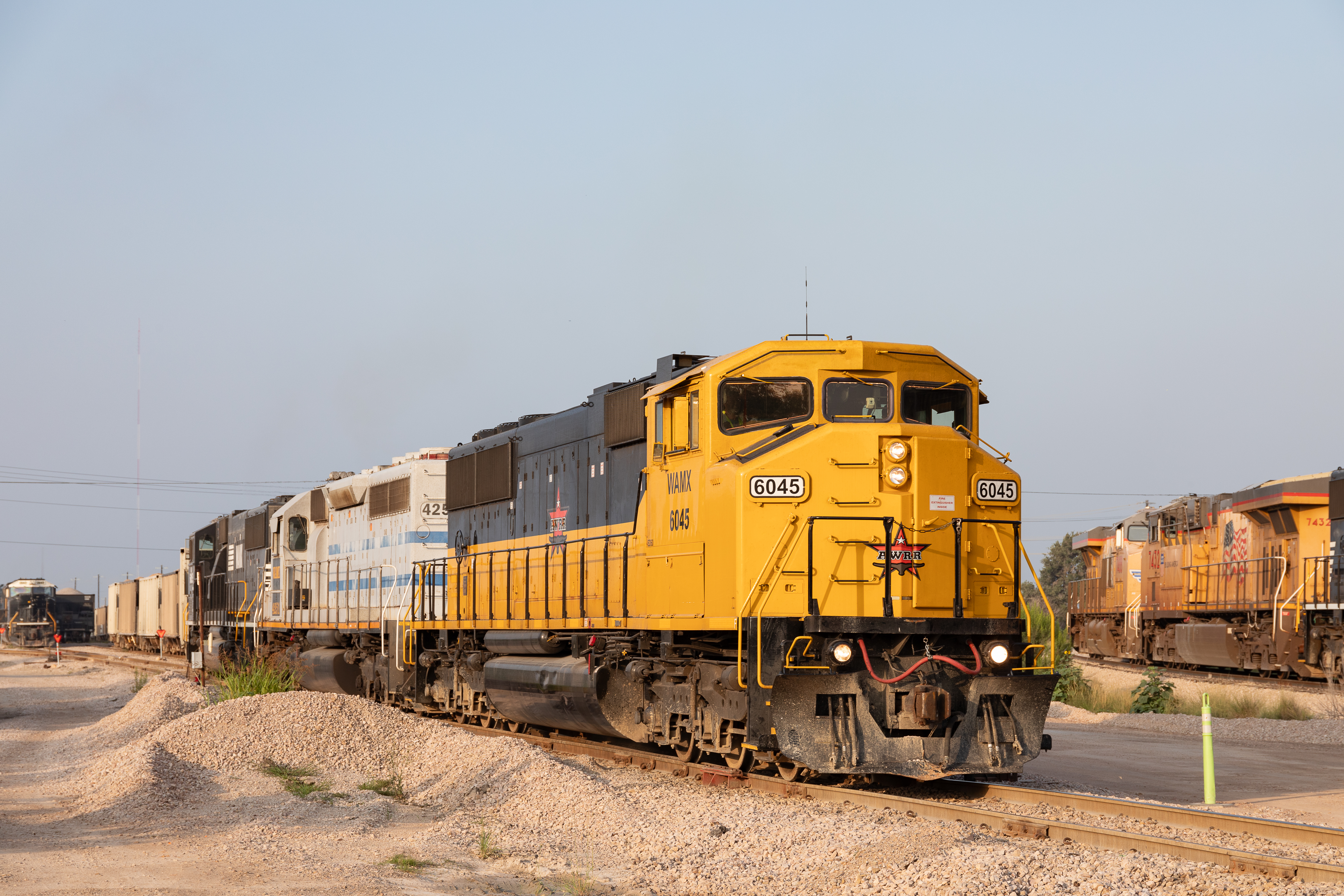
- An Austin Western (AWRR) train. AWRR is one of many subsidiary railroads of Watco.
- Type: Freight Transportation Services and Logistics
- Industry: Railroads; Logistics; Terminals & Ports
- Founded: July 1, 1983; 43 years ago
- Founder: Charles R. "Dick" Webb
- Headquarters: Pittsburg, Kansas, U.S.
- Area served: North America and Australia
- Key people: Dan Smith, CEO
- Number of employees: 4,800
- Website: watco.com

Watco Companies, L.L.C. (Watco) is an American transportation and logistics company based in Pittsburg, Kansas, U.S. The company's core services are freight transportation, material handling and storage, logistics, railcar repair and maintenance.

Watco owns and/or operates 47 short line railroads in North America and Australia, with more than 8,000 miles (13,000 km) of track connecting to Class I railroads. It is one of the largest short line owner-operators in the U.S. The company also operates, and in many cases owns, over 70 transload and marine terminals, and a handful of terminals that specialize in the repair and maintenance of railcars and locomotives.

Watco has about 4,800 employees, led by Chief Executive Officer Dan Smith. The company earned $1.6 billion in revenues in 2022.

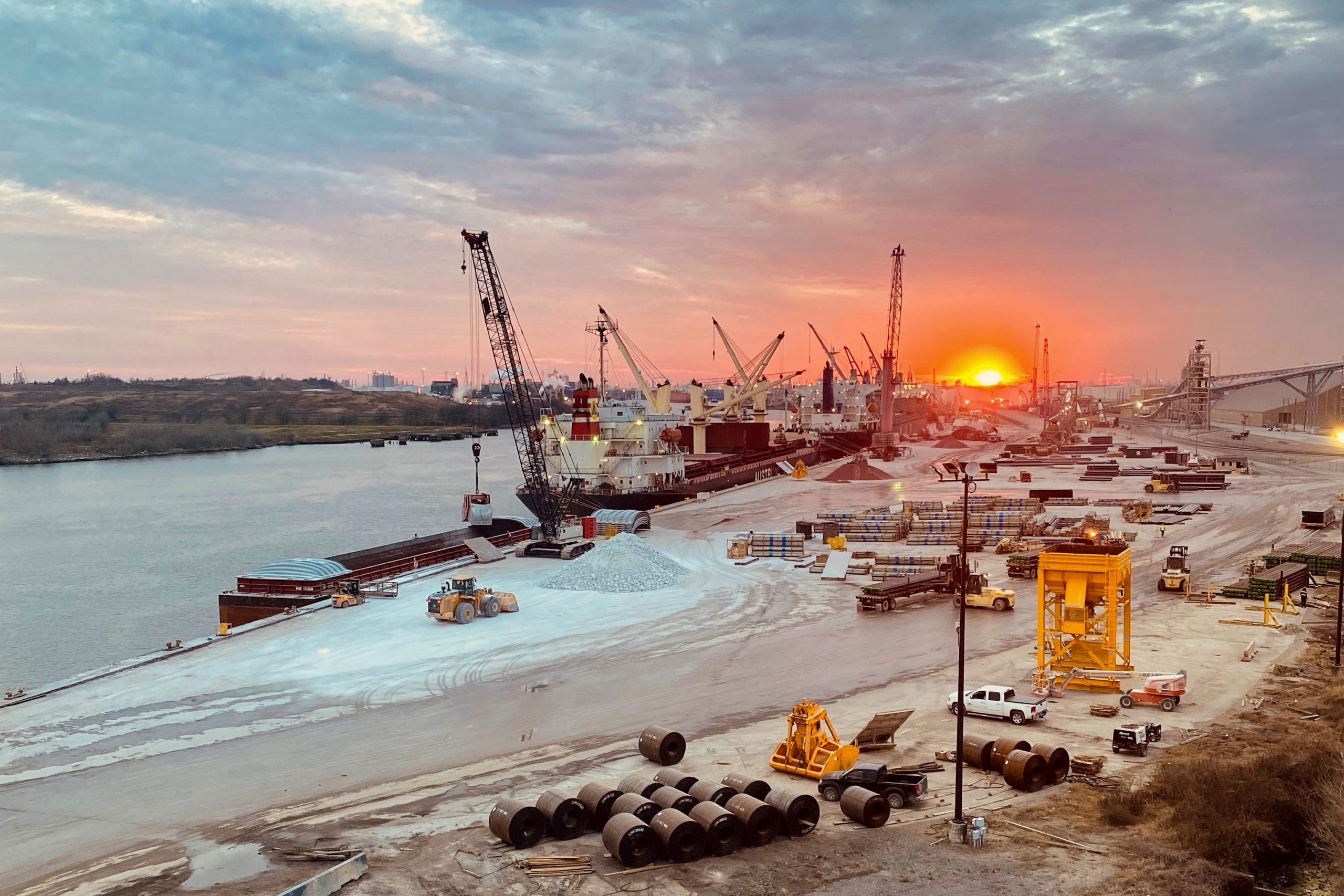
Watco's Greens Port

In 2023, the company was certified by Best Practice Institute (BPI) for the second year in a row as a Most Loved Workplace. In 2022, in collaboration with BPI, Newsweek named Watco to its annual list of America's Top 100 Most Loved Workplaces. Watco was also named a 2023 Newsweek Top 100 Global Most Loved Workplace®.

== History ==
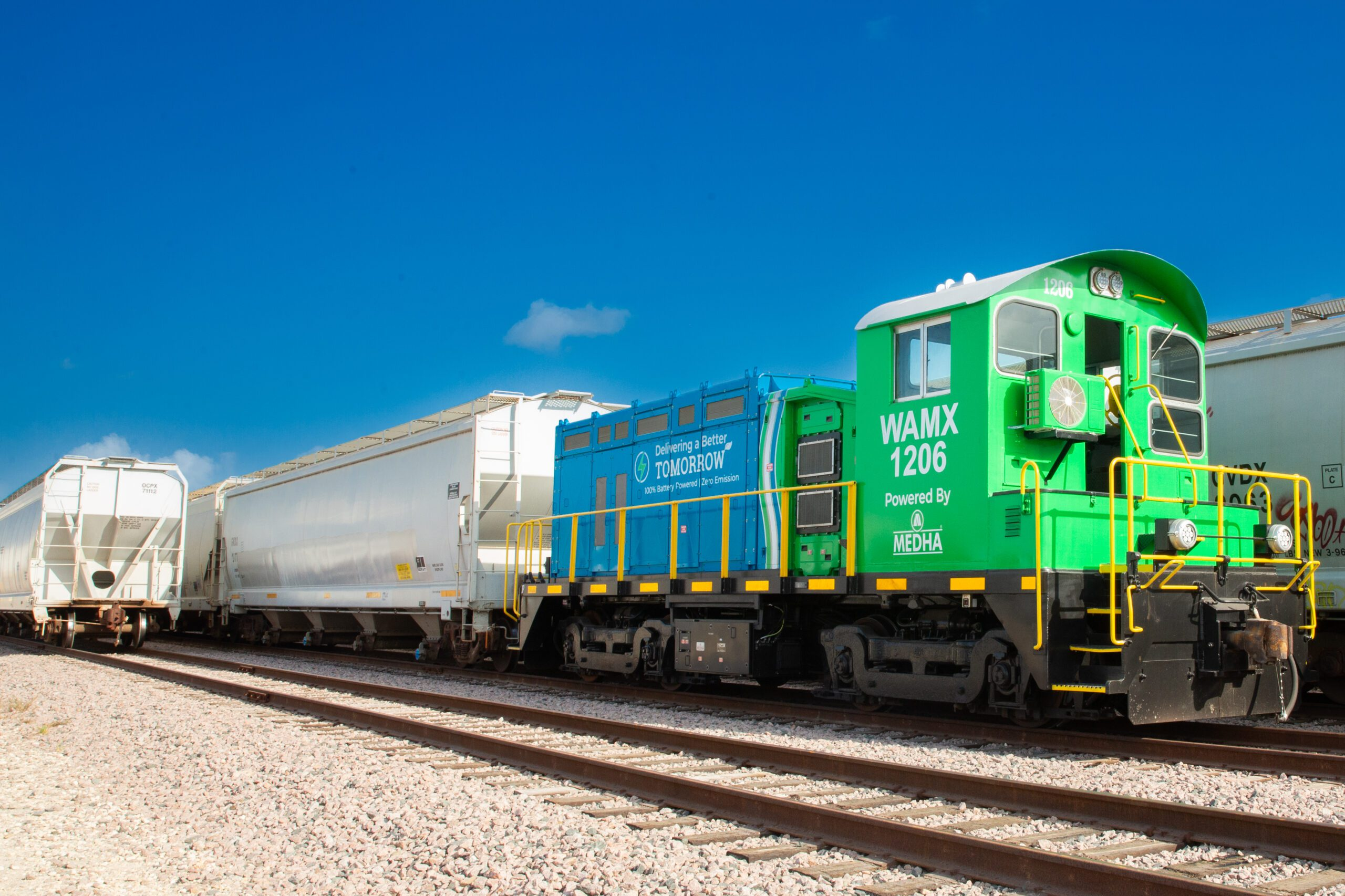
One of the new Watco battery-powered switching locomotives.

Watco was established in 1983 by Charles R. "Dick" Webb. The first operation was an industrial switching operation in DeRidder, Louisiana that is still in existence. Webb then started his first mechanical operation, a railcar repair shop in Coffeyville, Kansas in 1985.

The Coffeyville mechanical shop was held captive to the major rail lines, and during discussions with the Union Pacific the opportunity arose to purchase the line running from Nevada, Missouri, to Coffeyville. This was the Union Pacific's first short-line sale. Watco then looked to the West Region, acquiring the Blue Mountain Railroad in 1998, the Palouse River and Coulee City Railroad in 1992 and the Eastern Idaho Railroad in 1993.

In 1998, it began operating the Stillwater Central Railroad in Oklahoma and the Timber Rock Railroad in Texas. The Kansas & Oklahoma Railroad was acquired in 2001 and the Pennsylvania Southwestern Railroad in 2003. In 2004, they started operations of the Great Northwest Railroad in Washington, the Kaw River in Kansas and Missouri, and the Mission Mountain Railroad in Montana. In 2005 it began operating the Alabama Southern Railroad, the Louisiana Southern Railroad, the Mississippi Southern Railroad, and the Yellowstone Valley Railroad in Montana. The Austin Western Railroad was started in 2007 and shares rail with passenger rail. It also acquired Millennium Rail, a mechanical service company in 2007. The Baton Rouge Southern and the Pacific Sun Railroad were started in 2008, and they also acquired the mechanical services company Fitzgerald Railcar Services and Reload, a 25-year experienced transloading business. The Grand Elk Railroad began operations in 2009.

In December 2010 Watco entered the Australian rail haulage market when it was awarded a 10-year contract to operate grain services for the CBH Group of Western Australia. Operations commenced in March 2012. In late 2016 Watco Australia was awarded an infrastructure train contract with Brookfield Rail operating ballast and rail work trains.

On December 15, 2010, Kinder Morgan Energy Partners, announced an agreement whereby it would invest up to $150 million over the next year in Watco in exchange for a preferred equity position in the company. Kinder Morgan made an initial $50 million preferred shares investment on January 3, 2011. Additional $50 million equity investment completed in December 2011. Kinder Morgan will receive 3.25% quarterly distribution on the equity investment. Kinder Morgan is a leading pipeline transportation and energy storage company in North America. The transaction provides capital to Watco for further expansion of specific projects and offers Kinder Morgan the opportunity to share in the subsequent growth.

In April 2011, Watco began operating the Autauga Northern Railroad, between Maplesville and Autauga Creek, Alabama, the third short line in Alabama operated by Watco.

On December 28, 2011, Watco began operations of the Swan Ranch Railroad in the Swan Ranch Industrial Park in Cheyenne, Wyoming. On January 1, 2012, Watco gained majority ownership of the Wisconsin & Southern Railroad, a regional railroad in Wisconsin, and on February 1, 2012, took over operations of the Birmingham Southern Railroad.

On June 4, 2014, Watco and The Greenbrier Companies announced that it would create an equally owned joint venture, GBW Railcar Services, providing railcar repair services. This joint venture was dissolved in August 2018.

In July 2018, Dan Smith was named Watco's new CEO.

On March 30, 2021, Watco and Canadian National subsidiary Wisconsin Central reached a deal whereby WCL would sell roughly 900 miles of non-core rail lines located in Michigan, Wisconsin, and Ontario to Watco.

In January 2022, Watco takes over operations to move cattle in Queensland, Australia,

In June 2025, Duration Capital Partners invested over $600 million in Watco for its use in long-term strategic investments that include obtaining ownership of Industrial Rail Services, an operator at Dow Chemical facilities in the U.S. and Canada.

In October 2025, Watco began operations of the Great Lakes Central Railroad. The GLC team serves customers across many industries like agriculture, plastics, and oil and gas. The rail line stretches from Ann Arbor, Michigan, to northern Michigan including Cadillac, Traverse City, and Petoskey.

== Holdings ==
Railroad	Began operations	Track length (mi.)	Commodities	Facts
Agawa Canyon Railroad (ACR)	February 2022	289.96	materials for the metals and forest products industries	Southern segment of the former Algoma Central Railway, acquired from Canadian National
Alabama Southern Railroad (ABS)	November 2005	97.4	iron and steel, paper products, aggregates	Acquired through lease agreement with KCS
Alabama Warrior Railway (ABWR)	August 2009	2	coal, aggregates, pipe, scrap steel, cement	Started as Marylee Railroad in 1895
Ann Arbor Railroad (AA)	January 2013	91.6	automotive materials	Purchased from Ann Arbor Acquisition Corp, services mostly Chrysler plant producing Jeep Cherokees
Arkansas Southern Railroad (ARS)	October 2005	83	corn and soybean products	Two branches, 32-mile northern branch and a 30-mile southern branch
Austin Western Railroad (AWRR)	October 2007	204	aggregates, crushed limestone, calcium bicarbonate, lumber, beer, chemicals, plastic, paper	Shares rail with commuter operations in Austin, Texas
Autauga Northern Railroad (AUT)	April 2011	68.2	paper products and aggregates	Third Watco Alabama short line
Baton Rouge Southern Railroad (BRS)	November 2008	43	chemicals, bauxite, plastic pellets, raw coke, calcinated coke	Provides car storage and use by local chemical companies
Birmingham Terminal Railway (BHRR)	February 2012	178.3	iron ore, coal, steel sheets and pipe	Provides rail service to Port Birmingham
Blue Ridge Southern Railroad (BLU)	July 2014	104.8	woodchips, chemicals, paper, cement	Former Norfolk Southern T-Line (Murphy Branch), W-Line, and TR-line. Based in Canton, NC.
Boise Valley Railroad (BVRR)	November 2009	100	frozen vegetables, lumber, fertilizer, fuels	Shares customers with the YSVR and EIRR
Cicero Central Railroad (CERR)	2015	1.09	pitch and other chemicals to create plastics.	Serves the Koppers Stickney Plant
Decatur & Eastern Illinois Railroad (DREI)	September 2018	239.5	chemicals, plastics, soybeans, and corn	Operates on ex-CSX Transportation trackage acquired in 2018 and ex-Eastern Illinois Railroad trackage acquired in 2019
Dutchtown Southern Railroad (DUSR)	2021	41.1	products for the chemical, gas, and energy industries	operates on trackage leased from Canadian National
Eastern Idaho Railroad (EIRR)	1993	391.8	corn, sugar, wheat, frozen vegetables, coal	Largest Union Pacific sale
Fox Valley and Lake Superior (FOXY)	January 2022	609.8	metals, forest products, building materials, chemicals, propane, and fuel	Former Canadian National lines; major interchanges are in Appleton, Green Bay, Spencer, and Wausau
Ithaca Central Railroad (ITHR)	December 8, 2018	56.2	salt, plastics, magnesium chloride	Leased from Norfolk Southern
Geaux Geaux Railroad(GOGR)	December 2018	39.21	paper products	primary customer in paper industry
Grand Elk Railroad (GDLK)	March 2009	329.2	lumber products, corn, steel	Interchanges with 3 Class I railroads
Great Northwest Railroad (GRNW)	March 2004	286	lumber, products, fertilizers, aggregates	Competition to reach Lewiston while the line was being built was called the "Clearwater River Railroad Wars"
Kanawha River Railroad (KNWA)	July 2016	384.8	Chemicals, Aggregates, Agricultural Products	Second railroad to be acquired by Watco in the state of West Virginia. Appalachian & Ohio was briefly operated by Watco Transportation Services. Operates on former Norfolk Southern tracks in Ohio and West Virginia.
Kansas & Oklahoma Railroad (KO)	July 2001	974.4	wheat, grain products, chemicals, soybean products	Has state and federal shipping agreements
Kaw River Railroad (KAW)	June 2004	23.6	iron and steel, corn starch, lumber products, aggregates, plastics, industrial products	Expansions in 2005, 2006, and 2007
Louisiana Southern Railroad (LAS)	September 2005	217.1	paper products, aggregates, oils	Interchanges at Gibsland, Sibley, and Pineville
Mission Mountain Railroad (MMT)	December 2004	26	lumber, wheat	Runs from Stryker to Eureka, served by the BNSF
Mississippi Southern Railroad (MSR)	April 2005	191.1	corn and soybeans	Interchanges with KCS at Newton
Palouse River & Coulee City Railroad (PCC)	1992	307.8	wheat, frozen vegetables	$25 million in state-sponsored track rehabilitation backed by 100-year lease
Pennsylvania Southwestern Railroad (PSWR)	April 2003	14.6	steel scrap, steel products	First Watco operation to service a steel mill
Pecos Valley Southern Railway (PVSR)	2012	44.6	sand, gravel, crude oil	Formerly operated by Capitol Aggregates
San Antonio Central Railway (SAC)	2012	8.6	Warehousing, distribution, and transloading	Operates within Port San Antonio's East Kelly Railport at night
Savannah and Old Fort Railroad (SVHO)	2019	6.5	Sulfuric acid, sulfur, gypsum, pulpboard, wood pellets, and petroleum	Interchanges with CSX. Located in Savannah, Georgia.
Stillwater Central Railroad (SLWC)	1998	399.9	crude oil, sand, gypsum, cement, stone, steel	Serves on two branches: Pawnee to Stillwater and Tulsa to Duke
South Kansas & Oklahoma Railroad (SKOL)	March 1987	730.3	grains, cement, coal, fertilizer, aggregates, steel, sand	Operates out of the historic Cherryvale, Kansas depot and serves the Port of Catoosa at Tulsa, Oklahoma
Swan Ranch Railroad (SRRR)	December 2011	21	asphalt	The SRRR serves the Swan Ranch Industrial Park
Timber Rock Railroad (TIBR)	1998	62.12	aggregates, lumber products, plastics, fuel	Reduced to the single line running from Kirbyville, Texas to DeRidder, Louisiana.
Vicksburg Southern Railroad (VSOR)	January 2006	48.25	lumber, steel	Delivers to the Port of Vicksburg
Watco Australia	May 2012	NA - operator only	grain	First international operation of Watco, providing service in Western Australia and Queensland
Wisconsin & Southern Railroad (WSOR)	January 2012	808.5	lumber, coal, liquid and dry fertilizers, corn, beans, plastic, aggregates, ethanol, liquid petroleum	Wisconsin's second-largest railroad
Yellowstone Valley Railroad (YSVR)	August 2005	4.3	grains, plastics, ethanol, crude oil, sand	Provides service to the Dore Transload Terminal and interchanges with the BNSF
