= Eastern Idaho Railroad =

American railroad (1993–)

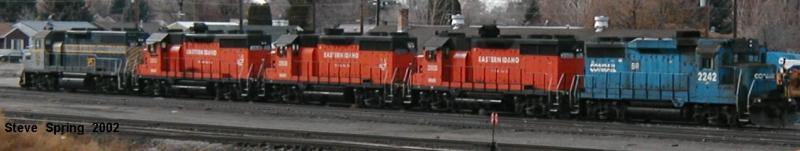
- Eastern Idaho Railroad roster in Idaho Falls

Overview
- Headquarters: Rupert, Idaho
- Reporting mark: EIRR
- Locale: United States in Idaho
- Dates of operation: April 13, 1993–
- Predecessor: Union Pacific Railroad

Technical
- Track gauge: 4 ft 8 1/2 in (1,435 mm) standard gauge
- Length: 270 miles (430 kilometers)

The Eastern Idaho Railroad (reporting mark EIRR) commenced on November 21, 1993, as a collection of two disconnected clusters of former Union Pacific (UP) branches. A subsidiary of Watco, EIRR operates two segments that move more than 35,000 carloads per year to the Union Pacific, with interchanges at Idaho Falls on the Northern Segment, and Minidoka on the Southern segment. The annual income is reported as being under 25 million dollars. Potatoes are a major commodity carried, using a unique loading technology to minimize damage during transit.

== The Southern segment ==
The Southern lines consist of:

- UP's former Twin Falls Branch (Minidoka to Buhl, 74 miles)
- UP's former North Side Branch (Rupert to Wendell, 57 miles)
- the Raft River Industrial Lead (Burley to Declo, 9 miles)
- the Oakley Industrial Lead (Burley to Martin, 11 miles).

All lines connect for a total of 152 miles (245 km). Operations are based out of the ex-UP depots at Twin Falls and Rupert. The southern segment interchanges with UP at Minidoka, Idaho.

== The Northern Segment ==
The Northern lines consist of:

- Union Pacific's former (Utah northern) main line in Idaho Falls (5 miles)
- the Yellowstone Branch (Idaho Falls to Ashton, 52 miles)
- the St Anthony Industrial Lead (Saint Anthony to Egin, 12 miles)
- the Goshen Industrial Lead (Ammon to Lincoln Junction, 4 miles)
- the East Belt Branch (Newdale to Orvin, 38 miles),
- the West Belt Industrial Lead (Ucon to Menan, 10 miles).

All lines connect for a total of 119 miles (192 km), served by four locomotives (August 2023), with operations based out of an office trailer on the north end of the Idaho Falls yard, the point at which EIRR interchanges with UP's Montana sub.
