= Eastern Illinois Railroad =

The Eastern Illinois Railroad (EIRC) was a Class III, 53-mile shortline railroad that ran from Neoga, Illinois, to Metcalf, Illinois, on former Toledo, St. Louis and Western Railroad trackage, with headquarters in Charleston, Illinois. The railroad hauled grain and lumber. There were 4 locomotives in operation on the EIRC when operations ceased, two they owned and two that were leased. They were an EMD GP9 and GP10, along with their prized pair of GP38-2 locomotives leased from ILSX and Wells Fargo. The president of EIRC was Everett Fletcher.

In 2019, Watco's Decatur & Eastern Illinois Railroad filed in intent to acquire EIRC. According to the senior counsel for ADM (company), a majority shareholder of NRG Inc. (which owned EIRC), EIRC ceased rail switching and terminal operations December 31, 2019, and ceased being a covered employer under the Railroad Retirement and Railroad Unemployment Insurance Acts on March 1, 2020.
