= Dutchtown Southern Railroad =

Dutchtown Southern Railroad, L.L.C.

Overview
- Parent company: Watco
- Headquarters: Geismar, Louisiana
- Reporting mark: DUSR

Other
- Website: www.watco.com/service/rail/dutchtown-southern-railroad/

Dutchtown Southern Railroad, L.L.C. is a standard gauge switching railroad in Geismar, Louisiana controlled by Watco Holdings, Inc. that operates a 1.76-mile line leased from Illinois Central Railroad Company, part of Canadian National Railway (CN). It interchanges at Geismar with CN.

== See also ==
Stephens, Bill (July 2021). "We need more Dutchtown Southerns". Trains. Kalmbach.
