= Egin, Idaho =

Human settlement in United States of America

Coordinates: 43°56′12″N 111°50′15″W

Egin is an unincorporated community in Fremont County, in the U.S. state of Idaho.

== History ==
A post office called Egin was established in 1880, and remained in operation until 1907. The name Egin reportedly means "cold" in an unidentified Native American language.
