= Mount Vernon Terminal Railroad =

Washington railroad

The Mount Vernon Terminal Railroad (reporting mark MVT) is a terminal railroad located in Mount Vernon, Washington.

== Routes ==
The MVT runs on the former Pacific Northwest Traction Company interurban tracks, and interchanges with the BNSF Railway's Seattle-Vancouver mainline.
