= Vicksburg Southern Railroad =

Shortline railroad in Vicksburg, Mississippi, United States

Overview
- Headquarters: Vicksburg, Mississippi
- Reporting mark: VSOR
- Locale: Western Mississippi
- Dates of operation: 2006–

Technical
- Track gauge: 4 ft 8 1/2 in (1,435 mm) standard gauge

The Vicksburg Southern Railroad (reporting mark VSOR) is a Shortline railroad in and near Vicksburg, Mississippi, United States, owned by Watco. It connects with the Kansas City Southern Railway's Meridian Speedway in Vicksburg, and stretches north to Redwood and south to Cedars. The line was once part of a main line between Memphis and New Orleans, completed by the Louisville, New Orleans and Texas Railway, a predecessor of the Illinois Central Railroad, in about 1884. The Illinois Central Gulf Railroad sold the remaining portions near Vicksburg, along with the present Meridian Speedway, to the MidSouth Rail Corporation in 1986, and in 1993 the Kansas City Southern Railway (KCS) gained control of MidSouth, subsequently absorbing it. The newly created Vicksburg Southern leased the lines from KCS in January 2006.
