= Northwestern Oklahoma Railroad =

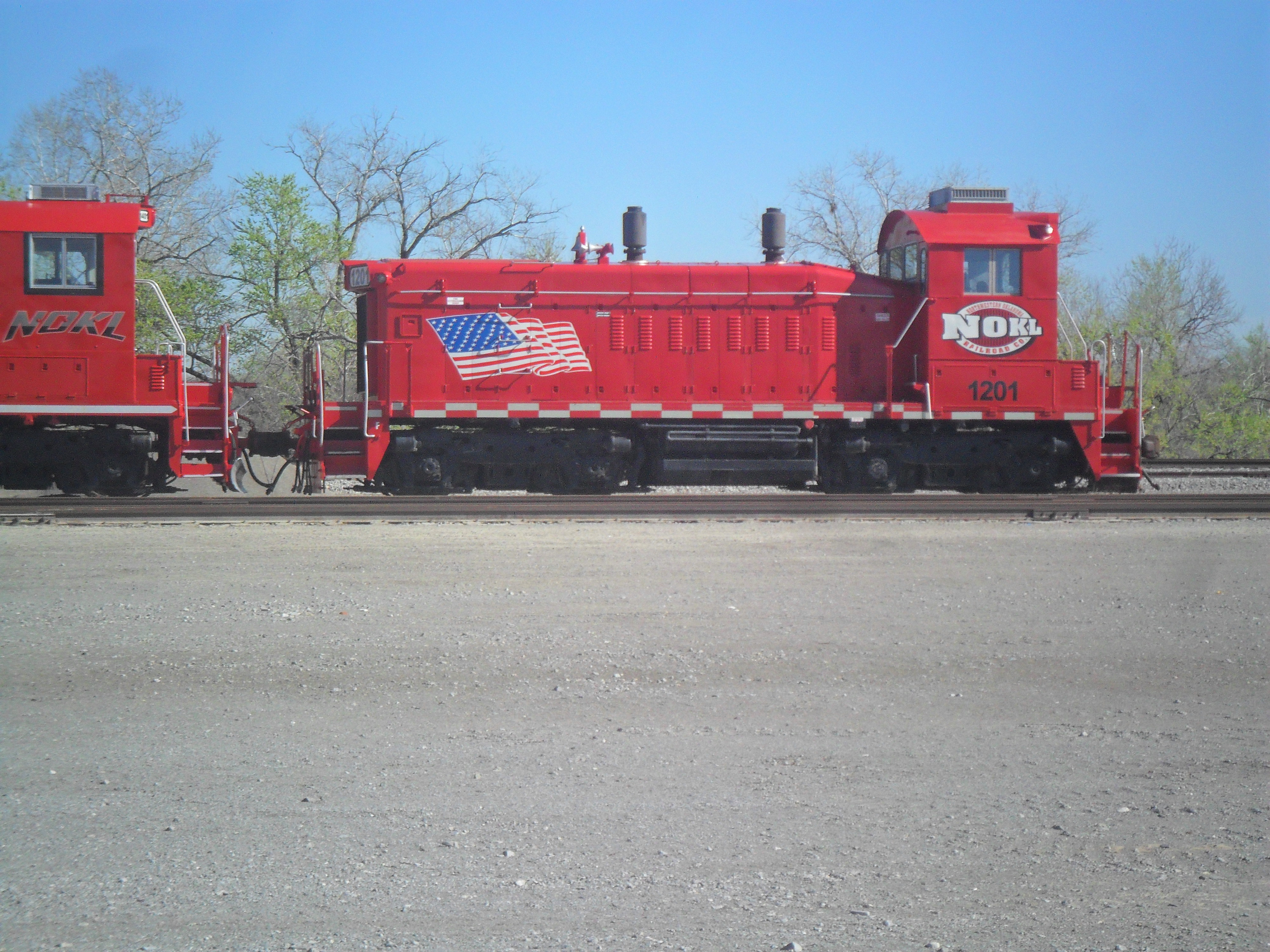
- NOKL 1201, one of the Northwestern Oklahoma Railroad's EMD SW1200 switchers, sits at the yard in Woodward, Oklahoma. It was built in 1957 for the Canadian National Railway.

Overview
- Headquarters: Woodward, Oklahoma
- Reporting mark: NOKL
- Locale: Woodward, Oklahoma
- Dates of operation: 1973–present

Technical
- Track gauge: 4 ft 8 1/2 in (1,435 mm) standard gauge
- Length: 5 miles (8.0 km)

Other
- Website: noklrailroad.com

The Northwestern Oklahoma Railroad (reporting mark NOKL) is a shortline railroad operating in Woodward, Oklahoma that operates approximately 5 miles (8.0 km) of track. Founded in 1973, the railroad provides switching services for industrial customers and interchanges with the BNSF Railway in Woodward. Primary commodities carried include drilling mud, oilfield pipe, and sand to support the oil industry.

A former “All-Door” boxcar of the line, built in 1978, is displayed in non-operational condition at the Illinois Railway Museum.
