= Dubois County Railroad =

Overview
- Headquarters: French Lick, Indiana
- Reporting mark: DCRR
- Locale: southern Indiana

Technical
- Track gauge: 4 ft 8 1/2 in (1,435 mm) standard gauge

The Dubois County Railroad (reporting mark DCRR) is a Class III short-line railroad serving Dubois County in southern Indiana, United States, and is a for-profit subsidiary of the Indiana Railway Museum, now better known as the French Lick Scenic Railway.

The railroad branches off a Norfolk Southern line in Huntingburg and heads north to the county seat of Jasper. Beyond Jasper, the tracks are owned and operated by the Indiana Railway Museum as a heritage railroad. The total length of the Dubois County Railroad is approximately 7 miles (11 km).

Freight hauled on the line consists mainly of petroleum products. The Railroad also operates tourist service for the Spirit of Jasper
