= East Brookfield and Spencer Railroad =

Terminal railroad in Massachusetts

Coordinates: 42°13′23″N 72°01′25″W

Overview
- Headquarters: Spencer, Massachusetts
- Dates of operation: 2004–present

The East Brookfield and Spencer Railroad is a shortline railroad operating in East Brookfield and Spencer, Massachusetts that serves the Northeast Automotive Intermodal Gateway. The company is privately owned by an automobile importing company, and connects with the adjacent CSX Boston Subdivision mainline.

== History ==
The railroad was formed in 2004, and that year leased a 4-mile (6.4 km) long passing siding from CSX Transportation, along with a stub track leading to an automotive terminal under construction. Upon the opening of the Northeast Automotive Intermodal Gateway in late 2004, the East Brookfield and Spencer Railroad began operating to provide switching for the terminal.

== Operations ==
The East Brookfield and Spencer Railroad acts as a switching and terminal railroad for the Northeast Automotive Intermodal Gateway, a destination for automobile imports to New England. Trains of automobiles are delivered to the site by CSX, while the switching of the trains for unloading is handled by the East Brookfield and Spencer Railroad. It is estimated the railroad handles around 23,000 autoracks per year.
