= Timber Rock Railroad =

Shortline railroad

Overview
- Headquarters: Pittsburg, Kansas (Watco)
- Locale: Texas and Louisiana
- Dates of operation: 1998–Present

Technical
- Track gauge: 4 ft 8 1/2 in (1,435 mm)
- Length: 41.5 mi (66.8 km)

The Timber Rock Railroad (reporting mark TIBR) is a shortline rail carrier operating in the states of Texas and Louisiana. Its single line runs from Kirbyville, Texas to DeRidder, Louisiana, about 41.5 miles. It is owned by the Watco Companies.

== History ==
The TIBR began operations in 1998 when Watco leased the Kirbyville to DeRidder line from what is now the BNSF Railway. This line had been completed in 1906 by the Jasper and Eastern Railroad, a subsidiary of the Atchison, Topeka and Santa Fe. Watco later leased other lines from BNSF, including Kirbyville to Tenaha, Texas in 2002, Kirbyville to Silsbee, Texas in February 2004, and Somerville, Texas to Silsbee in July 2004. At that point, the line was operating across about 290 miles of track. But thereafter, the line began discontinuing service on various segments. By the time in early 2017 when the BNSF exercised an option to take back over operation of the trackage from Silsbee to Tenaha, TIBR was reduced to the original Kirbyville to DeRidder line.

== Operations ==
Besides the endpoints of Kirbyville and DeRidder, the line serves Bon Wier, Texas and Merryville, Louisiana. (Note: Besides showing the outdated information about the TIBR operating the north-south line from Tenaha to Silsbee—when that line is again operated by the BNSF-- the data about TIBR on the Kansas City Southern (KCS) website contains misinformation in the form of a map showing TIBR serving a town designated as “Tencho” in Texas as the northern terminus of the line up from Silsbee. This reference to Tencho, Texas has even been picked up in a government report. However, it appears to be a typo or a misunderstanding. Other sources agree the railline TIBR used to lease from BNSF ran from Silsbee to Tenaha, not Tencho, and the KCS website itself notes TIBR interchanged with the BNSF at Tenaha, without noting the location of Tenaha on the map. The KCS map also shows Tencho as being southwest of Shreveport, which is the location of Tenaha. Major mapping services come up empty when asked to identify the location of a Tencho, Texas. In any event, since BNSF regained operational control of the line north from Silsbee, the TIBR does not serve any town called Tencho.)

While the TIBR will move any commodity, the primary traffic on the line is aggregates, lumber products, plastics, and fuel.

The line interchanges with the BNSF in Kirbyville, and the Kansas City Southern Railway in DeRidder.
