= Birmingham Terminal Railway =

Overview
- Headquarters: Fairfield, Alabama
- Reporting mark: BHRR
- Locale: Birmingham, Alabama
- Dates of operation: 2012–
- Predecessor: Birmingham Southern Railroad

Technical
- Track gauge: 4 ft 8 1/2 in (1,435 mm)
- Length: 75.9 miles (122.1 km)

Other
- Website: Official website

Birmingham Terminal Railway (reporting mark BHRR) is a subsidiary of Watco, operator of several short-line railroad companies. The BHRR operates on 76.1 miles (122.5 km) of track, providing switching services in the Birmingham, Alabama area. It was incorporated as a business entity in 2011 and began operating in 2012 after acquiring the assets of the Birmingham Southern Railroad.
