= Swan Ranch Railroad =

Overview
- Reporting mark: SRRR
- Locale: Cheyenne, Wyoming
- Dates of operation: 2011–

Technical
- Track gauge: 4 ft 8 1/2 in (1,435 mm) standard gauge
- Length: 17,192 feet (3.2561 mi)

Other
- Website: www.watcocompanies.com
Route map
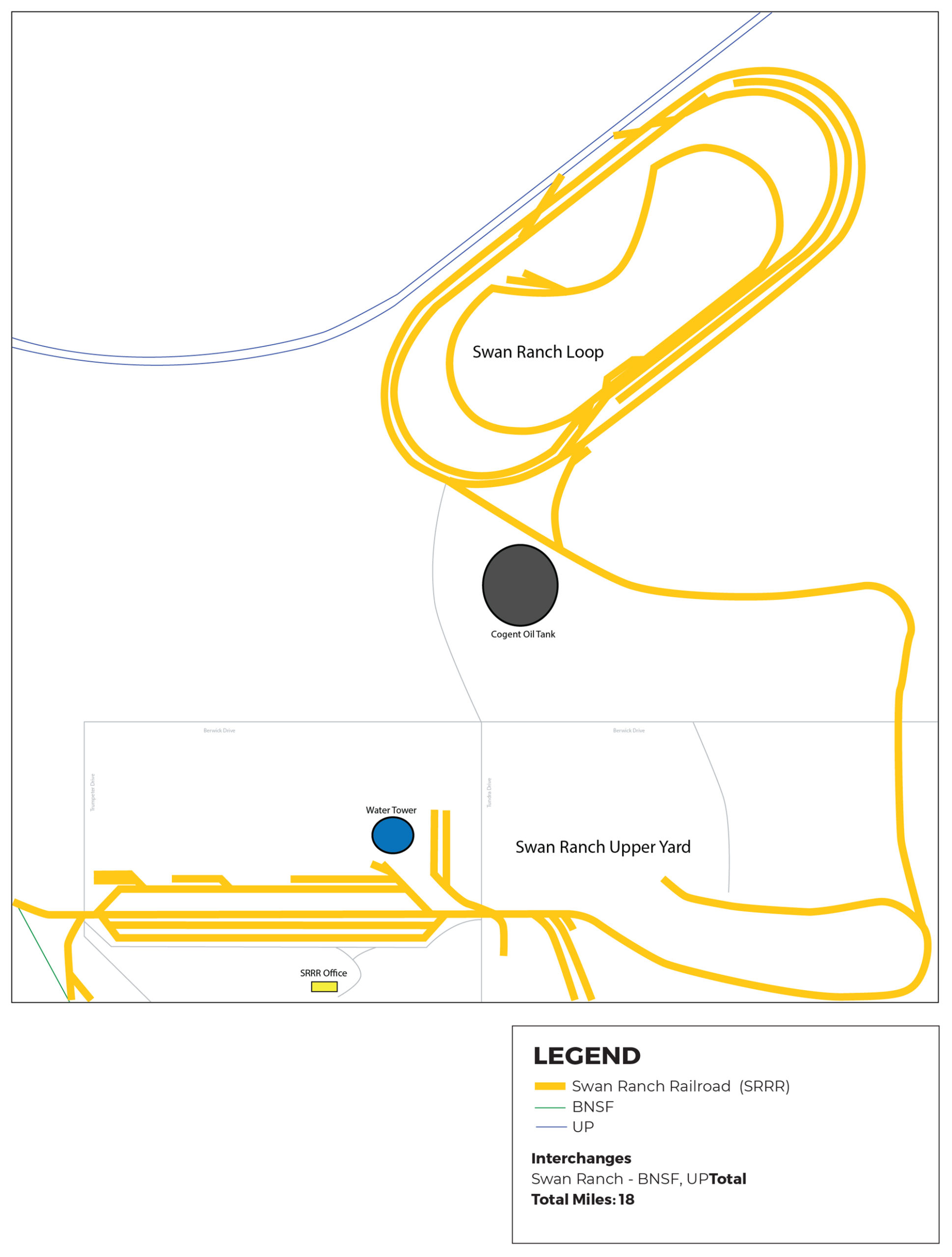

The Swan Ranch Railroad (reporting mark SRRR) is an industrial railroad that operates within the Swan Ranch Industrial Park, located in Cheyenne, Wyoming. The railroad is owned and operated by Watco, which announced the formation of the SRRR on 30 November 2011. SRRR began operations in December 2011, operating 17,192 feet (3.2561 mi) of trackage. SRRR interchanges with both the BNSF and Union Pacific railroads.

Today the Railroad operates over 17 miles of track, serves seven customers including Jebro Industries, Brenntag Pacific, Searing Industries, HollyFrontier Refinery, Granite Peak Transloading and Cheyenne Rail Hub. This unique state-of-the-art development is at the intersection of two Class I railroads, the Union Pacific and the BNSF, as well as two major interstate highways, I-25 and I-80 – making it a prime location for manufacturing and distribution companies. Transloading services are available at the SRRR.
