= Tradepoint Rail =

Tradepoint Rail (reporting mark TPR), formerly known as the Baltimore Industrial Railroad, is a switching and terminal railroad located on Sparrows Point, Maryland in the industrial sector of Baltimore, Maryland.

== History ==
The railroad was originally incorporated as the Baltimore & Sparrows Point Railroad Company. Bethlehem Steel took over the railroad in the early 20th century. In 1916, the railroad was renamed the Patapsco and Back Rivers Railroad. The PBR operated until 2012 when the steel mill closed down; however, in 2014 the remainder of the railroad was bought by Sparrows Point Terminal, LLC (SPT) and named The Baltimore Industrial Railroad. In January 2016 the railroad was renamed Tradepoint Rail (TPR), a part of the Tradepoint Atlantic family of companies. The rebuilt system has 100 miles (160 km) of track, the largest privately owned rail yard on the East Coast, access to Norfolk Southern Railway and CSX Transportation, and a fully operational locomotive shop capable of major repairs.

Steel was the main commodity hauled during the era of the steel mill, but currently most revenue comes from tank car storage.

== Locomotive roster ==
Locomotive number	Model	Year built
116	EMD SW7	1950
217	EMD SW1500	Sep 1969
936	EMD SW7	1950
8706	EMD GP11	Aug 1956, rebuilt July 1979
8730	EMD GP11	Aug 1956, rebuilt Mar 1980

Roster source: The Patapsco and Back Rivers Railroad: Chronicles of the Push, Bump and Ram by Elmer J. Hall (2010)

All of the TPR locomotives were PBR locomotives.

== See also ==
- List of Maryland railroads
