= Tyburn Railroad =

Overview
- Headquarters: Kennett Square, Pennsylvania
- Reporting mark: TYBR
- Locale: Morrisville, Bucks County, Pennsylvania

Technical
- Track gauge: 4 ft 8 1/2 in (1,435 mm) standard gauge
- Length: 1.5 miles

Other
- Website: http://www.tyburnrr.com/

The Tyburn Railroad (reporting mark TYBR) is a short-line railroad in Morrisville, Bucks County, Pennsylvania owned by Regional Rail, LLC. The railroad operates 1.5 miles (2.4 km) of track, serving a rail to truck transload facility. It interchanges with CSX Transportation and Norfolk Southern Railway in Fairless. The Tyburn Railroad was acquired by Regional Rail, LLC in September 2011.
