= Sequatchie Valley Railroad =

The Sequatchie Valley Railroad (reporting mark SQVR) was originally part of the Jasper Branch Railroad that was founded in 1860. The SQVR took over in the mid-1990s and now runs from Bridgeport, Alabama, to near Jasper, Tennessee. It is categorized as a "Local Railroad" by the AAR.
