= Point Comfort and Northern Railway =

Railway

Overview
- Headquarters: Lolita, Texas
- Reporting mark: PCN
- Locale: Texas
- Dates of operation: 1948–present

Technical
- Track gauge: 4 ft 8 1/2 in (1,435 mm) standard gauge
- Length: 14 miles (23 km)

The Point Comfort and Northern Railway (reporting mark PCN) is a Class III railroad operating in the U.S. state of Texas. The railroad operates over 14 miles (23 km) of track between Point Comfort, Texas, (at the Port of Port Lavaca - Point Comfort) and Lolita, Texas, where the railroad transfers cars with Union Pacific.

PCN was purchased by the holding company RailAmerica in 2005; RailAmerica in turn was purchased by Genesee & Wyoming.

The railroad's traffic largely comes from aluminum products from Alcoa World Alumina & Chemicals as well as plastics.

PCN hauled around 12,500 carloads in 2008.
