= Louisiana Southern Railroad =

American shortline railroad

Overview
- Headquarters: Minden, Louisiana
- Locale: Louisiana
- Dates of operation: 2005–Present

Technical
- Track gauge: 4 ft 8 1/2 in (1,435 mm)
- Length: 195.4 mi (314.5 km)

The Louisiana Southern Railroad (reporting mark LAS) is a shortline railroad operating in the state of Louisiana. It began operations on September 25, 2005 on two unconnected lines leased from the Kansas City Southern Railway (reporting mark KCS). The northern branch runs south from Springhill, Louisiana through Sarepta and Cotton Valley to Minden, Louisiana, with one set of tracks continuing south to Sibley, Louisiana, and another set running west through Princeton to Shreveport, Louisiana. The south branch runs generally south-southeast from Gibsland, Louisiana through towns like Bienville, Hodge, and Winnfield, to end at Pineville, Louisiana. The total trackage is currently 195.4 miles.

The LAS interchanges with KCS at Gibsland, Sibley, and Pineville. The line has 42 employees. Its operational headquarters are in Minden, and the line has a mobile repair services location in Hodge. It is owned by the Watco companies.

While the line will move any commodity, major commodities include sand, chemicals, petroleum, metals, ores, paper, and forest products.
