= Huntsville and Madison County Railroad Authority =

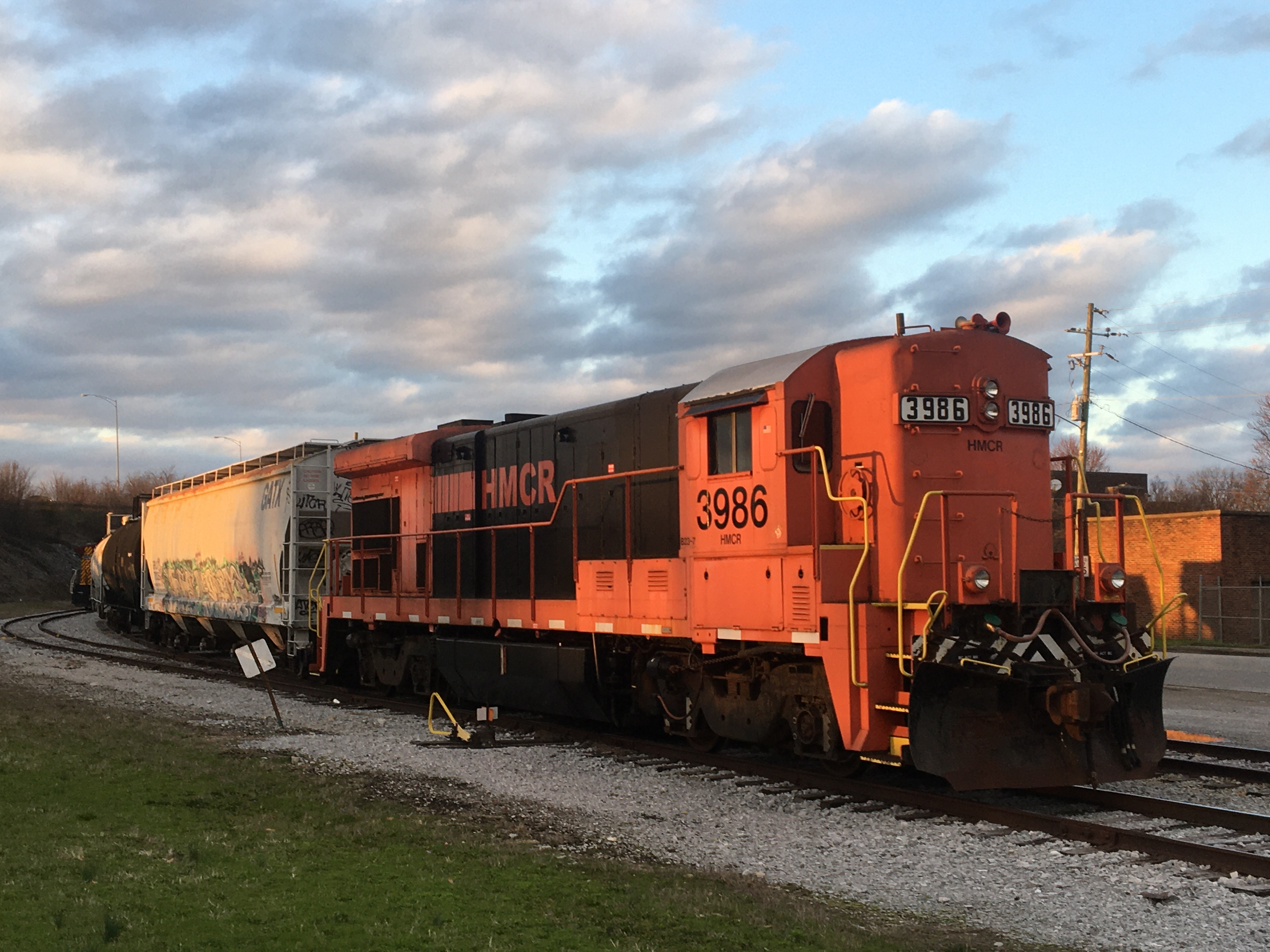

Overview
- Headquarters: Huntsville, Alabama
- Reporting mark: HMCR
- Locale: Huntsville, Alabama to Norton, Alabama
- Dates of operation: 1984–present

Technical
- Track gauge: 4 ft 8 1/2 in (1,435 mm) standard gauge
- Length: 13.25 miles (21.32 km)

Other
- Website: hmcrr.com

The Huntsville and Madison County Railroad Authority (reporting mark HMCR) was created in 1984 to operate on 13.25 miles (21.32 km) of track that was abandoned by the Louisville and Nashville Railroad.

The line was originally constructed by the Nashville, Chattanooga and St. Louis Railway and this portion of the railway ran from Huntsville to Attalla, Alabama (near Gadsden). A ferry ran the train down the Tennessee River between Incline (near Hobbs Island) and Gunters Landing (at Guntersville). The NC&StL later became part of the Louisville and Nashville Railroad. The HMCR now operates the line between downtown Huntsville and the community of Norton. The tracks between Norton and Incline have been abandoned and in sections, have been removed completely. The Alabama and Tennessee River Railway operates the line south of Guntersville. The ferry service has been abandoned.

In early 2015, the railroad began utilizing General Electric locomotives, and retired the EMD switchers historically in use. In early 2017, HMCR rostered one U23B, one B23-7, and three B39-8E locomotives. Primary traffic consists of various plastics and other chemicals, a marked shift from brick, lumber, sand, and aggregates primarily handled in the past. Publicly available audited financials indicate the operation is in good financial condition.

The HMCR Authority exists as a public entity as an Alabama Railroad Authority, with authorizing subdivisions held by the City of Huntsville, and the County of Madison. Each subdivision appoints directors from time to time, as required. The HMCR Authority receives no appropriations or public funding, and exists on its own revenue generation. The Alabama Industrial Railroad operated the HMCR from 1984 until February 1985. The HMCR Authority has operated the railroad since 1998. The HMCR is a class 3 short line, under the jurisdiction of the Surface Transportation Board, a federal agency.

Mark Lumb, current board chairman.

The HMCR interchanges with the Norfolk Southern at Huntsville, Alabama.

== Sources ==
- Edward A. Lewis, American Shortline Railway Guide 5th ed., (Kalmbach Books, 1996).
- Mike Walker, SPV's Comprehensive Railroad Atlas of North America - Southern States (Steam Powered Publishing & SPV, 2001) Ownership and detail of rail line.
- North America Railroad Map Software v 2.13, (Railway Station Productions, 2004)
