= Boise Valley Railroad =

Railroad line in Idaho, United States

Map of the Boise Valley Railroad

The Boise Valley Railroad (reporting mark BVRR) is a shortline railroad in Idaho connecting Nampa with Boise and Wilder. It is owned and operated by Watco.

== History ==
On 23 November 2009, the railroad began operations, running over an 11 miles (18 kilometres) line between Wilder and Caldwell and a 25-mile(40 km) line between Nampa and Boise, with the two lines connected via trackage rights on the Union Pacific. Watco purchased the line from Idaho Northern & Pacific Railroad. Watco took over operations and leased the line to Union Pacific. Operations for both branches are based at Nampa Yard in Nampa where cars are interchanged to the Union Pacific.

As of August 2015, the railroad served around 60 clients and operated once a day on each weekday.

== Wilder Branch ==
The Wilder Branch begins at Caldwell and goes west to Wilder and switches between several packing houses. The branch is 11 miles long.

== Boise Branch ==
The 25 mile Boise Branch goes from Nampa to Boise Airport and is Union Pacific's former main line into Boise. The City of Boise closed the Boise Yard in 1989 but kept the branch active until 1996 when the eastern half was abandoned with the cessation of Amtrak's Pioneer.
