= Autauga Northern Railroad =

Overview
- Reporting mark: AUT
- Locale: Central Alabama
- Dates of operation: 2011–present
- Predecessor: Norfolk Southern

Technical
- Track gauge: 4 ft 8 1/2 in (1,435 mm) standard gauge
- Length: 43.62 miles (70.20 km)

The Autauga Northern Railroad (reporting mark AUT) is a shortline operating between Maplesville, Alabama and a plant of the International Paper Company near Prattville, Alabama, 43.62 miles (70.20 km). This trackage is leased from Norfolk Southern and was originally operated by the Mobile & Ohio, Gulf, Mobile & Ohio (GM&O), and Illinois Central Gulf railroads as part of their line between Montgomery, Alabama and Tuscaloosa, Alabama. In addition, Autauga Northern uses 10.08 miles (16.22 km) of trackage rights over CSX, also ex-GM&O, to gain access into Montgomery. The lease from Norfolk Southern was approved in February 2011, and operations began in April 2011 as part of Watco.

Watco undertook a $2.39 million refurbishment of the railway after beginning operations to upgrade track to handle 25 mile-per-hour speeds. The railroad operates six days a week under Watco control, moving about 9,000 carloads per year.
