= Kaw River Railroad =

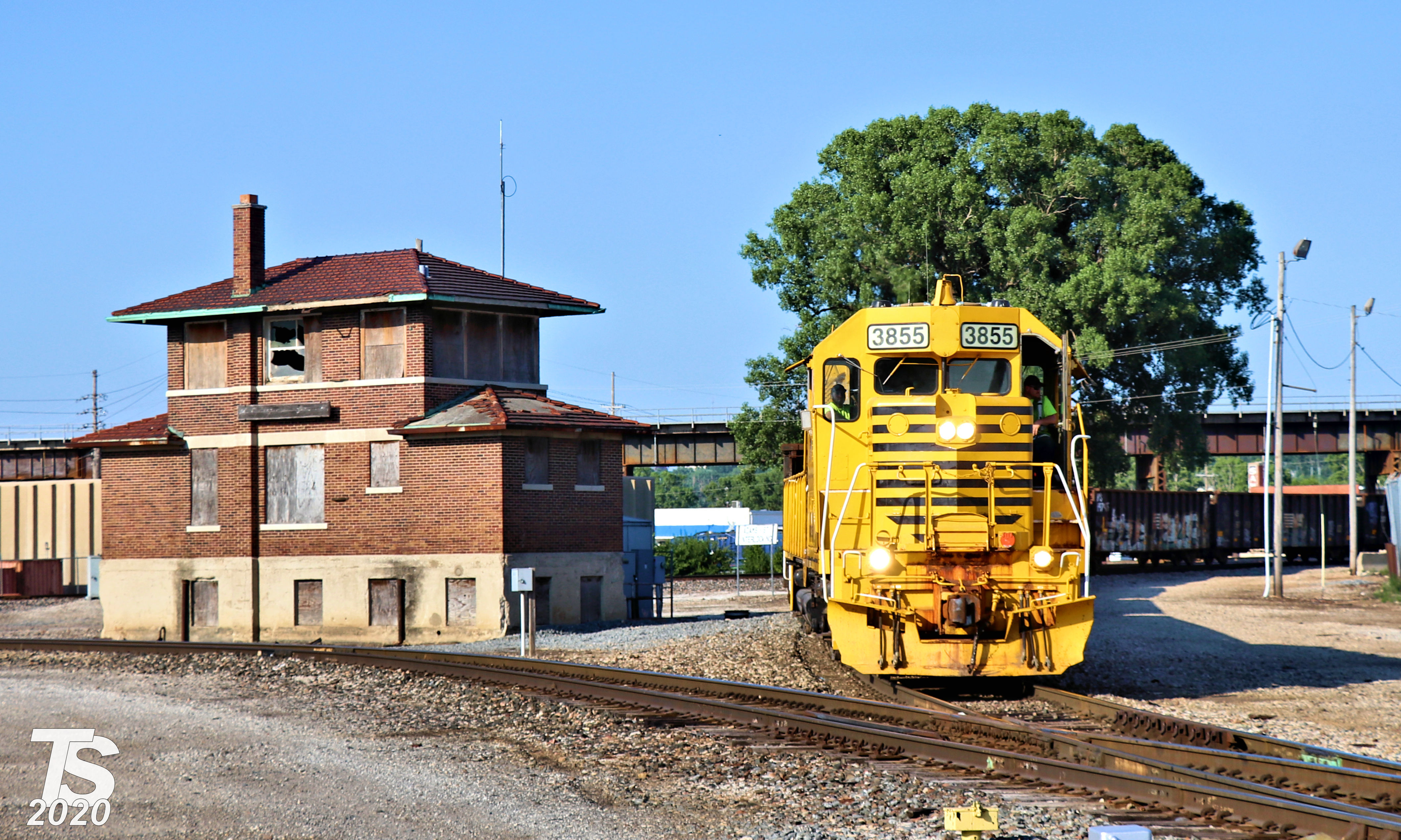
- KAW diesel locomotive 3855 in Kansas City in August 2020
- Company type: Railroad
- Industry: Transportation
- Founded: June 2004
- Headquarters: Kansas City, Kansas, United States
- Products: Iron and steel, corn starch, lumber products and aggregates
- Number of employees: 25
- Parent: Watco
- Website: www.watcocompanies.com

The Kaw River Railroad (reporting mark KAW) is a Kansas City, Missouri railroad, established in June 2004. Twelve miles of original track served the Kansas City Southern Railroad customers in Kansas City and Union Station. The original KAW was a Kansas City Southern Railway Company property and was the first shortline Watco began operating for KCS, serving customers in the Greater Kansas City area and handling interchanges among the BNSF, KCS, and Union Pacific.

The KAW operations office is located in Kansas City, Kansas; Customer Service is located in both Pittsburg and Kansas City, Kansas.

Collectively, the KAW and KCTL handle approximately 15,000 carloads of animal byproducts, chemicals, plastics and industrial products annually. The KAW also has a transload site available for handling dry bulk products and other carload traffic.

== Additions and expansions ==
The April 2005 expansion was a BNSF property serving customers in Clay County, Missouri, and interchanges with the BNSF at Birmingham, Missouri. The KCTL interchanges with all the Class I railroads serving Kansas City.

In March 2006 the KAW took up operations for the Kansas City Terminal Railway (KCTL), adding more than 30 customers.

In May 2007, nearly 15 miles of industrial track were added to serve customers of the Bedford Yard.
