= Ithaca Central Railroad =

Overview
- Headquarters: Ithaca, New York
- Locale: New York and Pennsylvania, USA
- Dates of operation: December 8, 2018–

Technical
- Track gauge: 4 ft 8 1/2 in (1,435 mm) standard gauge
- Length: 48.8 track miles

Other
- Website: www.watco.com

The Ithaca Central Railroad (reporting mark ITHR) is a 48.8-mile-long (78.5 km) shortline railroad operating in New York and Pennsylvania, owned by Watco. The ITHR leases and operates the Norfolk Southern-owned Ithaca Secondary from Sayre, Pennsylvania (Norfolk Southern interchange), to Ludlowville, New York. The railroad began operations on December 8, 2018, serving its primary customer, the Cargill Cayuga Rock Salt Mine, in Lansing, New York. The railroad can haul various commodities such as salt, coal, plastics, and magnesium chloride.

The railroad uses two ex-Union Pacific EMD SD40-2 (SD45 carbody) locomotives, WAMX 4247 and WAMX 4248. On January 30, 2019, the ITHR received a third EMD SD40-2, WAMX 4241.
