= Delray Connecting Railroad =

Overview
- Headquarters: River Rouge, Michigan
- Reporting mark: DC
- Locale: Michigan
- Dates of operation: 1904–

Technical
- Track gauge: 4 ft 8 1/2 in (1,435 mm) standard gauge
- Length: 15.46 miles

Delray Connecting Railroad (reporting mark DC) is a railroad operating on Zug Island in Michigan. The railroad interchanges with the Canadian National (formerly Grand Trunk Western (GTW)), Norfolk Southern (NS), CSX and Conrail.

Delray Connecting Railroad is owned and operated by Transtar, Inc.. U.S. Steel's Great Lakes Works, a steel mill, is the primary customer.
