= Kingman Terminal Railroad =

The Kingman Terminal Railroad operates about 3 miles of track at the Kingman Industrial Park north of Kingman, Arizona. It is owned by Patriot Rail Company and its reporting mark is KGTR. It connects to the BNSF Railway's Seligman Subdivision.
