= Olympia and Belmore Railroad =

Overview
- Parent company: Genesee and Wyoming
- Headquarters: Centralia, Washington
- Reporting mark: OYLO
- Dates of operation: 2016–
- Predecessor: Tacoma Rail

Technical
- Track gauge: 4 ft 8 1/2 in (1,435 mm)
- Length: 6 miles (9.7 km)

Other
- Website: www.gwrr.com/oylo

The Olympia and Belmore Railroad (reporting mark OYLO) is a short-line railroad headquartered in Centralia, Washington, USA. The railroad operates a line leased from the BNSF Railway which runs between Olympia and Belmore. The company began operations in 2016. It is a subsidiary of Genesee & Wyoming.

== History ==
The Genesee & Wyoming formed the company in 2016 to lease a 13.06-mile (21.02 km) BNSF Railway line between Olympia and Belmore. The line primarily carries traffic from Olympia's port facilities. Tacoma Rail had leased the line from 2004 to 2016 but chose not to renew.

In 2024, it had 6 miles (9.7 km) of track that it operated on. It interchanged with BNSF at East Olympia, Washington. It also interchanged with Union Pacific at Olympia and Tumwater, Washington.
