= Sidney and Lowe Railroad =

Shortline railroad in Nebraska

The Sidney and Lowe Railroad (reporting mark SLGG) is a switching railroad with 11 miles of line (12 miles of track) that runs between Sidney, Nebraska and connections with BNSF Railway at Huntsman, Nebraska and with Union Pacific Railroad at Brownson, Nebraska. It was founded in 1980 by Oscar J. Glover, President and CEO of Glover Group to service a railroad car maintenance and repair facility that Glover had built in the area near the United States Army's Big Sioux Depot. Glover later jointly built a grain storage and transfer facility that was serviced by the Sidney & Lowe Railroad. It became a common carrier in 1982 and was purchased by Progress Rail in 1996.
