= Baton Rouge Southern Railroad =

- Company type: Railroad
- Industry: Transportation
- Founded: November 11, 2008
- Headquarters: Baton Rouge, Louisiana
- Products: Plastic, chemicals, bauxite, plastic pellets, raw coke and calcined coke
- Number of employees: 21
- Parent: Watco
- Website: www.watco.com

The Baton Rouge Southern Railroad, abbreviated BRS, was founded in November 2008. The main objective of the 1.5-mile railroad is to provide cars and transloading services to local businesses. It also serves as a switching and car storage facility for the Kansas City Southern. It holds an advantageous location close to the Port of Greater Baton Rouge, Port Allen, Louisiana. It is owned by Watco.
