= Grand Elk Railroad =

Class III railroad in Indiana and Michigan, USA

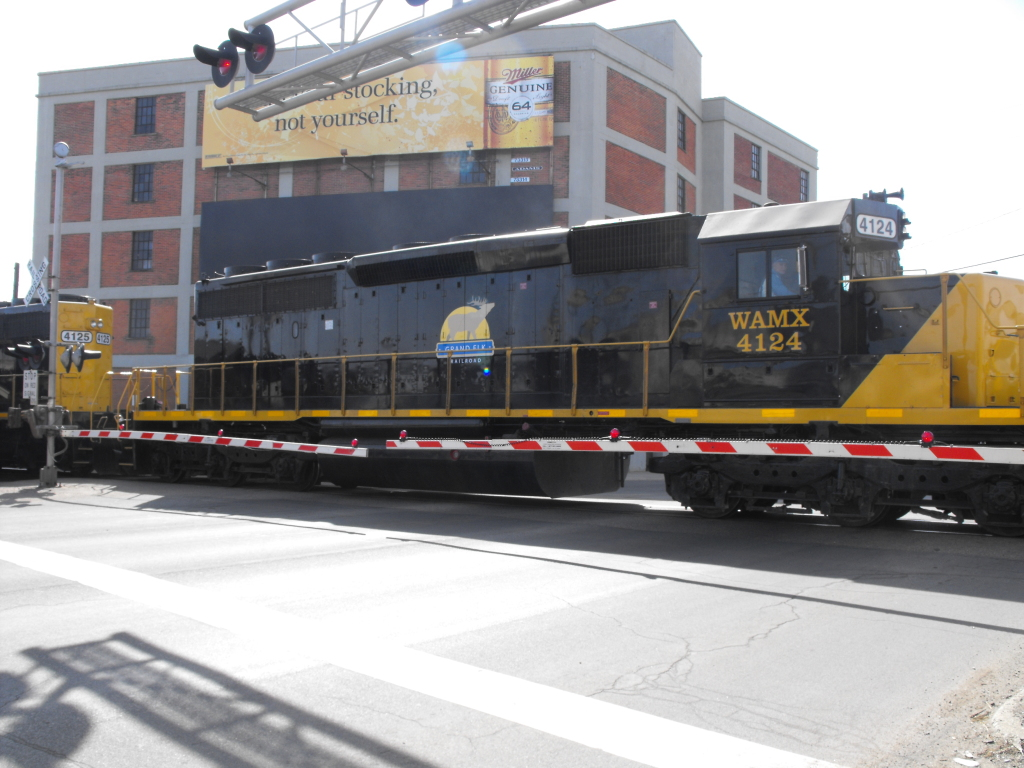
- Grand Elk (WAMX)#4124 is headed to Grand Rapids.

Overview
- Headquarters: Kalamazoo, Michigan
- Reporting mark: GDLK
- Locale: Indiana and Michigan
- Dates of operation: 2009–present

Technical
- Track gauge: 4 ft 8 1/2 in (1,435 mm) standard gauge

The Grand Elk Railroad (reporting mark GDLK) is a Class III railroad which operates in the states of Indiana and Michigan. It is one of 40+ short-line railroads owned by Watco.

The company leases a 123 miles (198 km) line from the Norfolk Southern running south from Grand Rapids, Michigan, through Kalamazoo, Michigan, to Elkhart, Indiana. The line they lease was a former Grand Rapids and Indiana Railroad mainline from Grand Rapids to Kalamazoo. From Kalamazoo to Elkhart, IN they use a former Lake Shore & Michigan Southern branch. Watco projects 22,000 carloads per year from 55 customers. Operations began on March 8, 2009.

The railroad connects with three larger railroads, the Norfolk Southern (Elkhart and Kalamazoo), CSX (Grand Rapids) and Canadian National (Kalamazoo, Michigan via CN Kilgore Yard) as well as three short line railroads, the Marquette Rail (Grand Rapids), Grand Rapids Eastern Railroad (Grand Rapids), and Michigan Southern Railroad (White Pigeon, Michigan).

Watco expanded to the Upper Peninsula of Michigan in 2021 when Canadian National divested many former Wisconsin Central Ltd. lines. This includes a line from Trout Lake to Munising and an out of service line to a former mine in White Pine, both formerly operated by the Duluth, South Shore and Atlantic Railway. Watco's UP operations are based out of Newberry where they built a new engine house in 2022.
