= Yellowstone Valley Railroad =

Overview
- Reporting mark: YSVR
- Locale: Northeastern Montana, West McKenzie County, North Dakota
- Dates of operation: 2005–

Technical
- Track gauge: 4 ft 8 1/2 in (1,435 mm) standard gauge

The Yellowstone Valley Railroad (reporting mark YSVR) is a 171-mile (275 km) shortline railroad in northeastern Montana, also crossing into North Dakota. It operates two branch lines leased from the BNSF Railway in 2005 - Snowden to Glendive and Bainville to Scobey - connected by trackage rights over BNSF's Northern Transcon between Snowden and Bainville.

== History ==
The northern segment, from Bainville to Scobey, was constructed by the Great Northern Railway (GN), opening to Plentywood in 1911 and Scobey in 1914. A further extension was built to Opheim and later abandoned. The other line was built as a pair of branch lines connecting Sidney to the GN at Snowden and the Northern Pacific Railway (NP) at Glendive. The Snowden-Sidney piece was completed by the Montana Eastern Railway, a GN subsidiary, in 1915, and the remainder by the NP in 1912. Effective August 15, 2005, the YSVR leased both of these lines from the BNSF Railway, successor to the GN and NP.
