= List of Minnesota railroads =

The following railroads operate in the U.S. state of Minnesota.

== Common freight carriers ==
- Airlake Terminal Railway (reporting mark ALT)
- BNSF Railway (reporting mark BNSF)
- Canadian National Railway (reporting mark CN) including subsidiaries Cedar River Railroad (reporting mark CEDR), Duluth, Missabe and Iron Range Railway (reporting mark DMIR), Duluth, Winnipeg and Pacific Railway (reporting mark DWP), Illinois Central Railroad (reporting mark IC) and Wisconsin Central Ltd. (reporting mark WC)
- Canadian Pacific Kansas City (reporting mark CPKC) through subsidiaries Dakota, Minnesota and Eastern Railroad (reporting mark DME) and Soo Line Railroad (reporting mark SOO)
- Cloquet Terminal Railroad (reporting mark CTRR)
- Minnesota Commercial Railway (reporting mark MNNR)
- Minnesota, Dakota and Western Railway (reporting mark MDW)
- Minnesota Northern Railroad (reporting mark MNN)
- Minnesota Prairie Line, Inc. (reporting mark MPLI)
- Northern Lines Railway (reporting mark NLR)
- Northern Plains Railroad (reporting mark NPR)
- Otter Tail Valley Railroad (reporting mark OTVR)
- Progressive Rail, Inc. (reporting mark PGR)
- Red River Valley and Western Railroad (reporting mark RRVW)
- St. Croix Valley Railroad (reporting mark SCXY)
- Twin Cities and Western Railroad (reporting mark TCWR)
- Union Pacific Railroad (reporting mark UP)

== Private freight carriers ==
- Cliffs Erie Railroad (reporting mark LTVX)
- Northshore Mining (reporting mark NSMX)
- US Steel

== Passenger carriers ==
- Amtrak (reporting mark AMTK)
- Lake Superior and Mississippi Railroad
- METRO Light Rail
- North Shore Scenic Railroad (reporting mark NSSR)
- Osceola and St. Croix Valley Railway (reporting mark MNTX)

== Defunct railroads ==
| Name | Mark | System (Note: This is one or more of the Class I railroads that the railroad became part of, if any.) | From | To | Successor | Notes |
|---|---|---|---|---|---|---|
| Albert Lea and Southern Railroad | ALS | IC | 1899 | 1908 | Dubuque and Sioux City Railroad | |
| Austin and Mankato Railroad | | GN | 1880 | 1881 | St. Cloud, Mankato and Austin Railroad | |
| Barnesville and Moorhead Railway | BMR | GN | 1880 | 1880 | St. Paul, Minneapolis and Manitoba Railway | |
| Bass Brook Railroad | BBR | | 1889 | 1892 | N/A | |
| Big Fork and International Falls Railway | BFIF | NP | 1908 | 1923 | Northern Pacific Railway | |
| Big Fork and Northern Railway | BFN | NP | 1905 | 1942 | Northern Pacific Railway | |
| Brainerd and Northern Minnesota Railway | BNMR | NP | 1892 | 1901 | Minnesota and International Railway | |
| Buffalo Ridge Railroad | BFRR | | 1989 | 1992 | Nobles Rock Railroad | |
| Burlington, Cedar Rapids and Northern Railway | BCRN | RI | 1876 | 1903 | Chicago, Rock Island and Pacific Railway | |
| Burlington Northern and Santa Fe Railway | BNSF | | 1996 | 2005 | BNSF Railway | |
| Burlington Northern Inc. | BN | | 1970 | 1981 | Burlington Northern Railroad | |
| Burlington Northern Railroad | BN | | 1981 | 1996 | Burlington Northern and Santa Fe Railway | |
| Caledonia and Mississippi Railway | CMRC | MILW | 1873 | 1880 | Chicago, Clinton, Dubuque and Minnesota Railroad | |
| Caledonia, Mississippi and Western Railroad | CMWR | MILW | 1879 | 1880 | Chicago, Clinton, Dubuque and Minnesota Railroad | 3 ft Narrow Gauge |
| Canadian Northern Railway | CN | CN | 1901 | 1923 | Canadian National Railway | |
| Cannon River Improvement Company | | CGW | 1872 | 1878 | Minnesota Central Railroad | |
| Cedar Rapids, Iowa Falls and Northwestern Railway | CRIN | RI | 1880 | 1902 | Burlington, Cedar Rapids and Northern Railway | |
| Cedar Valley Railroad | CVAR | | 1984 | 1991 | Cedar River Railroad | |
| Central Railroad of Minnesota | CRCM | MILW | 1872 | 1879 | Southern Minnesota Railway | |
| Chatfield Railroad | CHRC | CNW | 1878 | 1881 | Winona and St. Peter Railroad | |
| Cherokee and Dakota Railroad | CDRC | IC | 1887 | 1888 | Dubuque and Sioux City Railroad | |
| Chicago, Burlington and Northern Railroad | | CB&Q | 1885 | 1899 | Chicago, Burlington and Quincy Railroad | |
| Chicago, Burlington and Quincy Railroad | CB&Q, CBQ | CB&Q | 1899 | 1970 | Burlington Northern Inc. | |
| Chicago, Burlington and Quincy Railway | | CB&Q | 1901 | 1907 | N/A | Leased the Chicago, Burlington and Quincy Railroad |
| Chicago, Clinton, Dubuque and Minnesota Railroad | CCDM | MILW | 1878 | 1880 | Chicago, Milwaukee and St. Paul Railway | |
| Chicago and Dakota Railway | CDRY | CNW | 1879 | 1881 | Winona and St. Peter Railroad | |
| Chicago, Dubuque and Minnesota Railroad | CDMR | MILW | 1871 | 1877 | Dubuque and Minnesota Railroad | |
| Chicago Great Western Railroad | CGW | CGW | 1909 | 1941 | Chicago Great Western Railway | |
| Chicago Great Western Railway | CGW | CGW | 1940 | 1968 | Chicago and North Western Railway | |
| Chicago Great Western Railway | CGW | CGW | 1892 | 1909 | Chicago Great Western Railroad | |
| Chicago, Milwaukee and St. Paul Railway | CMSP | MILW | 1874 | 1928 | Chicago, Milwaukee, St. Paul and Pacific Railroad | |
| Chicago, Milwaukee, St. Paul and Pacific Railroad | MILW | MILW | 1928 | 1985 | The Milwaukee Road, Inc. | |
| Chicago and North Western Railway | CNW | CNW | 1870 | 1972 | Chicago and North Western Transportation Company | |
| Chicago and North Western Transportation Company | CNW | CNW | 1972 | 1995 | Union Pacific Railroad | |
| Chicago, Rock Island and Pacific Railroad | RI, ROCK | RI | 1947 | 1980 | Chicago and North Western Railway | |
| Chicago, Rock Island and Pacific Railway | RI | RI | 1902 | 1948 | Chicago, Rock Island and Pacific Railroad | |
| Chicago, St. Paul and Kansas City Railway | CSPKC | CGW | 1886 | 1893 | Chicago Great Western Railway | |
| Chicago, St. Paul, Minneapolis and Omaha Railway | CMO | CNW | 1881 | 1972 | Chicago and North Western Transportation Company | |
| Cuyuna Iron Range Railway | CIRR | CP | 1908 | 1910 | Minneapolis, St. Paul and Sault Ste. Marie Railway | |
| Cuyuna Northern Railway | CNRC | NP | 1911 | 1914 | Northern Pacific Railway | |
| Dakota Rail, Inc. | DAKR | | 1985 | 2000 | N/A | |
| Des Moines Valley Railway of Minnesota | DMVR | CNW | 1899 | 1900 | Chicago, St. Paul, Minneapolis and Omaha Railway | |
| Dubuque and Minnesota Railroad | DMNR | MILW | 1877 | 1878 | Chicago, Clinton, Dubuque and Minnesota Railroad | |
| Dubuque and Sioux City Railroad | DSCR | IC | 1888 | 1946 | Illinois Central Railroad | |
| Duluth Beltline | | | | | | |
| Duluth, Crookston and Northern Railroad | DCNR | NP | 1889 | 1898 | Northern Pacific Railway | |
| Duluth, Glencoe and Southwestern Railway | | MILW | 1888 | 1900 | Duluth, St. Cloud, Glencoe and Mankato Railway | |
| Duluth and Iron Range Railroad | DIRR | | 1874 | 1938 | Duluth, Missabe and Iron Range Railway | |
| Duluth and Manitoba Railroad | DMR | NP | 1885 | 1898 | Northern Pacific Railway | |
| Duluth and Manitoba Railway | | NP | 1884 | 1885 | Duluth and Manitoba Railroad | |
| Duluth, Missabe and Northern Railway | DM&N | DMN | 1891 | 1937 | Duluth, Missabe and Iron Range Railway | |
| Duluth, Mississippi River and Northern Railroad | DMRN | GN | 1892 | 1899 | Eastern Railway of Minnesota | |
| Duluth and Northeastern Railroad | DNE | | 1898 | 2002 | Cloquet Terminal Railroad | |
| Duluth and Northern Minnesota Railway | DNM | | 1898 | 1923 | N/A | |
| Duluth, Rainy Lake and Winnipeg Railway | DRLW | CN | 1905 | 1912 | Duluth, Winnipeg and Pacific Railway | |
| Duluth, Red Wing and Southern Railroad | DRWS | CGW | 1886 | 1901 | Wisconsin, Minnesota and Pacific Railroad | |
| Duluth, St. Cloud, Glencoe and Mankato Railway | DSCG | MILW | 1900 | 1910 | Chicago, Milwaukee and St. Paul Railway | |
| Duluth Short Line Railway | DSLR | NP | 1886 | 1898 | St. Paul and Duluth Railroad | |
| Duluth, South Shore and Atlantic Railroad | DSA | CP | 1949 | 1961 | Soo Line Railroad | |
| Duluth, South Shore and Atlantic Railway | DS&A, DSS&A, DSA | CP | | 1949 | Duluth, South Shore and Atlantic Railroad | |
| Duluth and Superior Bridge Company | DSB | | 1894 | 1901 | Eastern Railway of Minnesota | |
| Duluth, Superior and Western Railway | DSW | GN | 1896 | 1898 | Eastern Railway of Minnesota | |
| Duluth Terminal Railway | DTRC | GN | 1887 | 1928 | Great Northern Railway | |
| Duluth Transfer Railroad | DTRR | NP | 1902 | 1902 | Northern Pacific Railway | |
| Duluth Transfer Railway | DTRY | NP | 1890 | 1902 | Duluth Transfer Railroad | |
| Duluth Union Depot Company | DUD | NP | 1889 | 1892 | Duluth Union Depot and Transfer Company | |
| Duluth Union Depot and Transfer Company | DUDT | NP | 1892 | | N/A | |
| Duluth, Virginia and Rainy Lake Railway | DVRL | CN | 1901 | 1905 | Duluth, Rainy Lake and Winnipeg Railway | |
| Duluth and Winnipeg Railroad | DWRC | GN | 1878 | 1896 | Duluth, Superior and Western Railway | |
| Duluth, Winnipeg and Pacific Railroad | | CN | 1909 | | | |
| Eastern Railway of Minnesota | ERCM | GN | 1887 | 1907 | Great Northern Railway | |
| Electric Short Line Railroad | ESLR | CP | 1908 | 1915 | Electric Short Line Terminal Company | |
| Electric Short Line Railway | ESL | MSTL | 1908 | 1924 | Minnesota Western Railroad | |
| Electric Short Line Terminal Company | ESLTC | CP | 1915 | 1956 | Minneapolis, Northfield and Southern Railway | |
| Fargo and St. Louis Air Line Railroad | | MILW | 1883 | 1883 | Fargo and Southern Railway | |
| Fargo and Southern Railway | FSRC | MILW | 1883 | 1885 | Chicago, Milwaukee and St. Paul Railway | |
| Grantsburgh, Rush City and St. Cloud Railroad | GRSC | NP | 1878 | 1899 | St. Paul and Duluth Railroad | |
| Great Northern Railway | GN | GN | 1889 | 1970 | Burlington Northern Inc. | |
| Green Bay and Minnesota Railroad | GBM | | 1874 | 1881 | Green Bay, Winona and St. Paul Railroad | |
| Green Bay and Western Railroad | GB&W, GBW | | 1896 | 1985 | N/A | |
| Green Bay, Winona and St. Paul Railroad | GBWSP | | 1881 | 1896 | Green Bay and Western Railroad | |
| Gunflint and Lake Superior Railroad | G&LS | | 1902 | 1909 | N/A | |
| Hastings and Dakota Railway | HD | MILW | 1867 | 1880 | Chicago, Milwaukee and St. Paul Railway, Milwaukee and St. Paul Railway | |
| Hastings, Minnesota River and Red River of the North Railroad | | MILW | 1857 | 1867 | Hastings and Dakota Railway | |
| Hill City Railway | HCY | | 1915 | 1935 | N/A | |
| Illinois Central Railroad | IC | IC | 1887 | 1972 | Illinois Central Gulf Railroad | |
| Illinois Central Gulf Railroad | ICG | | 1972 | 1984 | Cedar Valley Railroad | |
| I&M Rail Link | IMRL | | 1997 | 2002 | Iowa, Chicago and Eastern Railroad | |
| International Bridge and Terminal Company | | | 1902 | 1910 | Minnesota, Dakota and Western Railway | |
| Iowa Central Railway | | MSTL | 1901 | 1912 | Minneapolis and St. Louis Railroad | |
| Iowa, Chicago and Eastern Railroad | ICE | | 2002 | 2008 | Dakota, Minnesota and Eastern Railroad | |
| Iowa, Minnesota and Northwestern Railway | | CNW | 1898 | 1900 | Chicago and North Western Railway | |
| Kettle River Railroad | | GN | 1886 | 1893 | Eastern Railway of Minnesota | |
| LaCrosse, Trempealeau and Prescott Railroad | | CNW | 1857 | 1877 | Chicago and North Western Railway | |
| Lake Superior and Mississippi Railroad | | NP | 1861 | 1877 | St. Paul and Duluth Railroad | |
| Lake Superior and South Western Railway | | GN | 1885 | 1888 | Eastern Railway of Minnesota | |
| Little Falls and Dakota Railroad | | NP | 1879 | 1900 | Northern Pacific Railway | |
| Little Falls and Southern Railroad | | NP | 1890 | 1899 | Northern Pacific Railway | |
| Mankato and New Ulm Railway | | CNW | 1899 | 1900 | Winona and St. Peter Railroad | |
| Mantorville Railway and Transfer Company | | CGW | 1895 | 1896 | Chicago Great Western Railway | |
| Mason City and Fort Dodge Railroad | | CGW | 1905 | 1940 | Chicago Great Western Railroad | |
| Mason City and Fort Dodge Railway | | CGW | 1902 | 1905 | Mason City and Fort Dodge Railroad | |
| McGregor Western Railway | | MILW | 1866 | 1867 | Milwaukee and St. Paul Railway | |
| Mesabe Southern Railway | | | 1894 | | N/A | |
| The Milwaukee Road, Inc. | MILW | MILW | 1985 | 1986 | Soo Line Railroad | |
| Milwaukee and St. Paul Railway | | MILW | 1867 | 1874 | Chicago, Milwaukee and St. Paul Railway | |
| Minneapolis, Anoka and Cuyuna Range Railroad | MA&C, MACR | GN | 1929 | | | |
| Minneapolis, Anoka and Cuyuna Range Railway | MA&C | GN | 1915 | 1929 | Minneapolis, Anoka and Cuyuna Range Railroad | Freight service electrified in 1922 |
| Minneapolis Belt Line Company | | GN | 1917 | 1928 | Great Northern Railway | |
| Minneapolis and Cedar Valley Railroad | | MILW | 1856 | 1860 | Minneapolis, Faribault and Cedar Valley Railroad | |
| Minneapolis and Duluth Railroad | | NP | 1871 | 1881 | Minneapolis and St. Louis Railway | |
| Minneapolis Eastern Railway | MINE | CNW/ MILW | 1878 | | | |
| Minneapolis, Faribault and Cedar Valley Railroad | | MILW | 1862 | 1864 | Minnesota Central Railway | |
| Minneapolis Industrial Railway | MIR | MSTL | 1959 | | | |
| Minneapolis, New Ulm and Southwestern Railroad | | MSTL | 1895 | 1899 | Minneapolis and St. Louis Railroad | |
| Minneapolis and Northern Railway | | GN | 1912 | 1915 | Minneapolis, Anoka and Cuyuna Range Railway | |
| Minneapolis, Northfield and Southern Railway | MNS | CP | 1918 | 1986 | Soo Line Railroad | |
| Minneapolis and Northwestern Railroad | | GN | 1878 | 1883 | St. Paul, Minneapolis and Manitoba Railway | |
| Minneapolis and Pacific Railway | | CP | 1884 | 1888 | Minneapolis, St. Paul and Sault Ste. Marie Railway | |
| Minneapolis and Rainy River Railway | M&RR | | 1904 | 1932 | N/A | |
| Minneapolis, Red Lake and Manitoba Railway | MRLM | | 1904 | 1938 | N/A | |
| Minneapolis, Rochester and Dubuque Traction Company | | CP | | 1907 | Minneapolis, St. Paul, Rochester and Dubuque Electric Traction Company | |
| Minneapolis and St. Cloud Railroad | | GN | 1856 | 1889 | Eastern Railway of Minnesota, Great Northern Railway, St. Paul, Minneapolis and Manitoba Railway | |
| Minneapolis and St. Croix Railway | | CP | 1883 | 1888 | Minneapolis, Sault Ste. Marie and Atlantic Railway | |
| Minnesota, St. Croix and Wisconsin Railroad | | CP | 1884 | 1888 | Wisconsin Central Company | |
| Minneapolis and St. Louis Railroad | | MSTL | 1894 | 1944 | Minneapolis and St. Louis Railway | |
| Minneapolis and St. Louis Railway | MSTL | MSTL | 1939 | 1960 | Chicago and North Western Railway | |
| Minneapolis and St. Louis Railway | | MSTL | 1870 | 1894 | Minneapolis and St. Louis Railroad | |
| Minneapolis, St. Paul, Rochester and Dubuque Electric Traction Company | | CP | 1907 | 1918 | Minneapolis, Northfield and Southern Railway | |
| Minneapolis, St. Paul and Sault Ste. Marie Railroad | SOO | | 1944 | 1961 | Soo Line Railroad | |
| Minneapolis, St. Paul and Sault Ste. Marie Railway | SOO | CP | 1888 | 1944 | Minneapolis, St. Paul and Sault Ste. Marie Railroad | |
| Minneapolis and St. Paul Terminal Railway | | RI | 1903 | 1904 | Chicago, Rock Island and Pacific Railway | |
| Minneapolis, Sault Ste. Marie and Atlantic Railway | | CP | 1886 | 1888 | Minneapolis, St. Paul and Sault Ste. Marie Railway | |
| Minneapolis Union Railway | | GN | 1881 | 1907 | Great Northern Railway | |
| Minneapolis Western Railway | | GN | 1884 | 1928 | Great Northern Railway | |
| Minnesota Belt Line Railway and Transfer Company | | CB&Q/ CGW/ CNW/ CP/ GN/ MILW/ MSTL/ NP/ RI | 1887 | 1898 | Minnesota Transfer Railway | |
| Minnesota and Black Hills Railroad | | CNW | 1879 | 1879 | St. Paul and Sioux City Railroad | |
| Minnesota Central Railroad | MCTA | | 1994 | 2000 | Minnesota Prairie Line, Inc. | |
| Minnesota Central Railroad | | CGW | 1857 | 1883 | Wisconsin, Minnesota and Pacific Railway | |
| Minnesota Central Railway | | MILW | 1864 | 1870 | McGregor Western Railway, Milwaukee and St. Paul Railway | |
| Minnesota and Dakota Northern Railroad | | GN | 1879 | 1883 | St. Paul, Minneapolis and Manitoba Railway | |
| Minnesota and Great Northern Railway | | GN | 1904 | 1907 | Great Northern Railway | |
| Minnesota and International Railway | MI | NP | 1900 | 1941 | Northern Pacific Railway | |
| Minnesota and Iowa Railway | | CNW | 1898 | 1900 | Chicago and North Western Railway | |
| Minnesota and Manitoba Railroad | | CN | 1899 | | | |
| Minnesota Midland Railway | | MILW | 1876 | 1883 | Chicago, Milwaukee and St. Paul Railway | |
| Minnesota and North Wisconsin Railroad | | | 1898 | 1912 | N/A | |
| Minnesota Northern Railroad | | NP | 1878 | 1881 | Northern Pacific, Fergus and Black Hills Railroad | |
| Minnesota and Northwestern Railroad | | CGW | 1854 | 1887 | Chicago, St. Paul and Kansas City Railway | |
| Minnesota and Northwestern Railroad | | MILW | 1857 | 1872 | Central Railroad of Minnesota | |
| Minnesota Northwestern Electric Railway | | | 1913 | 1940 | N/A | |
| Minnesota and Ontario Bridge Company | | CN | 1899 | | | |
| Minnesota and Pacific Railroad | | GN, MILW, NP | 1857 | 1860 | St. Paul and Pacific Railroad | |
| Minnesota Short Lines Company | MSLC | | | | | |
| Minnesota and South Dakota Railway | | CNW | 1899 | 1900 | Winona and St. Peter Railroad | |
| Minnesota Transfer Railway | MTFR | CB&Q/ CGW/ CNW/ CP/ GN/ MILW/ MSTL/ NP/ RI | 1883 | 1987 | Minnesota Commercial Railway | |
| Minnesota Valley Railroad | | CNW | 1864 | 1870 | St. Paul and Sioux City Railroad | |
| Minnesota Valley Railway | | CNW | 1876 | 1881 | Winona and St. Peter Railroad | |
| Minnesota Western Railroad | | MSTL | 1924 | 1932 | Minnesota Western Railway | |
| Minnesota Western Railroad | | MSTL | 1853 | 1870 | Minneapolis and St. Louis Railway | |
| Minnesota Western Railway | MW | MSTL | 1932 | 1959 | Minneapolis Industrial Railway | |
| Minnesota Western Railway | | CNW | 1901 | 1902 | Chicago and North Western Railway | |
| Mississippi, Hill City and Western Railway | MH&W | | 1908 | 1915 | Hill City Railway | |
| MNVA Railroad | MNVA | | 1984 | 1994 | Minnesota Central Railroad | |
| Moorhead and South Eastern Railway | | GN | 1884 | 1891 | St. Paul, Minneapolis and Manitoba Railway | |
| Nebraska and Lake Superior Railroad | | NP | 1857 | 1861 | Lake Superior and Mississippi Railroad | |
| Nobles Rock Railroad | NRR | | 1994 | 2000 | Minnesota Southern Railway | |
| Northern Pacific Railroad | | NP | 1864 | 1896 | Northern Pacific Railway | |
| Northern Pacific Railway | NP | NP | 1896 | 1970 | Burlington Northern Inc. | |
| Northern Pacific, Fergus and Black Hills Railroad | | NP | 1881 | 1898 | Northern Pacific Railway | |
| Northstar Line | MNRX | | 2009 | 2026 | | |
| Northwestern Coal Railway | | GN | 1894 | 1899 | Superior Belt Line and Terminal Railway | |
| Park Rapids and Leech Lake Railway | | GN | 1897 | 1907 | Great Northern Railway | |
| Plainview Railroad | | CNW | 1877 | 1881 | Winona and St. Peter Railroad | |
| Port Arthur, Duluth and Western Railway | | CN | 1892 | 1915 | N/A | |
| Railway Transfer Company of the City of Minneapolis | | MSTL | 1883 | 1984 | Chicago and North Western Transportation Company | |
| Red Lake Transportation Company | | | 1897 | 1904 | Minneapolis, Red Lake and Manitoba Railway | |
| Red River and Lake of the Woods Railway | | GN | 1882 | 1883 | St. Paul, Minneapolis and Manitoba Railway | |
| Red River and Manitoba Railroad | | GN | 1877 | 1879 | St. Paul, Minneapolis and Manitoba Railway | |
| Red River Valley Railroad | | GN | 1875 | 1879 | St. Paul, Minneapolis and Manitoba Railway | |
| Rochester and Northern Minnesota Railway | | CNW | 1877 | 1881 | Winona and St. Peter Railroad | |
| Root River Valley and Southern Minnesota Railroad | | MILW | 1855 | 1857 | Southern Minnesota Railroad | |
| St. Cloud and Lake Traverse Railway | | GN | 1880 | 1880 | St. Paul, Minneapolis and Manitoba Railway | |
| St. Cloud, Mankato and Austin Railroad | | GN | 1865 | 1886 | St. Paul, Minneapolis and Manitoba Railway | |
| St. Croix Railway and Improvement Company | | CNW | 1872 | 1873 | St. Paul, Stillwater and Taylors Falls Railroad | |
| St. Paul Bridge and Terminal Railway | SPB | CGW | 1908 | | | |
| St. Paul and Chicago Railway | | MILW | 1867 | 1872 | Milwaukee and St. Paul Railway | |
| St. Paul and Dakota Railroad | | CNW | 1876 | 1878 | Worthington and Sioux Falls Railroad | |
| St. Paul and Duluth Railroad | | NP | 1877 | 1900 | Northern Pacific Railway | |
| St. Paul, Minneapolis and Manitoba Railway | | GN | 1879 | 1907 | Great Northern Railway | |
| St. Paul and Northern Pacific Railway | | NP | 1883 | 1896 | Northern Pacific Railway | |
| St. Paul and Pacific Railroad | | GN, MILW, NP | 1862 | 1879 | St. Paul and Chicago Railway, St. Paul, Minneapolis and Manitoba Railway, Western Railroad of Minnesota | |
| St. Paul and St. Croix Railroad | | CP | 1884 | 1884 | Minnesota, St. Croix and Wisconsin Railroad | |
| St. Paul and St. Croix Falls Railway | | CP | 1885 | 1888 | Minnesota, St. Croix and Wisconsin Railroad | |
| St. Paul and Sioux City Railroad | | CNW | 1870 | 1881 | Chicago, St. Paul, Minneapolis and Omaha Railway | |
| St. Paul, Stillwater and Taylors Falls Railroad | | CNW | 1869 | 1880 | St. Paul and Sioux City Railroad | |
| St. Paul Terminal and Transfer Company | | RI | 1902 | 1903 | Minneapolis and St. Paul Terminal Railway | |
| St. Paul Union Depot Company | SPUD | CB&Q/ CGW/ CNW/ CP/ GN/ MILW/ MSTL/ NP/ RI | 1879 | | | |
| Sauk Center Northern Railway | | GN | 1881 | 1883 | St. Paul, Minneapolis and Manitoba Railway | |
| Sioux City and St. Paul Railroad | | CNW | 1866 | 1879 | St. Paul and Sioux City Railroad | |
| South St. Paul Belt Railroad | | RI | 1889 | 1903 | Minneapolis and St. Paul Terminal Railway | |
| Southern Minnesota Railroad | | MILW | 1857 | 1877 | Minnesota Valley Railroad, Southern Minnesota Railway | |
| Southern Minnesota Railway | | MILW | 1877 | 1880 | Chicago, Milwaukee and St. Paul Railway | |
| Southern Minnesota Railway Extension Company | | MILW | 1878 | 1880 | Southern Minnesota Railway | |
| Spirit Lake Transfer Railway | | | 1907 | 1937 | Duluth, Missabe and Iron Range Railway | |
| Stillwater and Hastings Railway | | MILW | 1880 | 1882 | Chicago, Milwaukee and St. Paul Railway | |
| Stillwater and St. Paul Railroad | | NP | 1867 | 1899 | St. Paul and Duluth Railroad | |
| Stillwater Street Railway and Transfer Company | | NP | 1878 | 1881 | Union Depot, Street Railway and Transfer Company of Stillwater | |
| Stillwater Union Depot and Transfer Company | | NP | 1888 | 1896 | Union Depot and Transfer Company of Stillwater | |
| Superior Belt Line and Terminal Railway | | GN | 1899 | 1900 | Eastern Railway of Minnesota | |
| Superior Belt Line and Terminal Railway | | GN | 1891 | 1894 | Northwestern Coal Railway | |
| Superior Short Line Railway | | CNW | 1885 | 1895 | Chicago, St. Paul, Minneapolis and Omaha Railway | |
| Superior Terminal and Belt Line Railway | | GN | 1890 | 1891 | Superior Belt Line and Terminal Railway | |
| Taylors Falls and Lake Superior Railroad | | NP | 1875 | 1898 | St. Paul and Duluth Railroad | |
| Transit Railroad | | CNW | 1855 | 1860 | Winona and St. Peter Railroad | |
| Union Depot, Street Railway and Transfer Company of Stillwater | | NP | 1881 | 1888 | Stillwater Union Depot and Transfer Company | |
| Union Depot and Transfer Company of Stillwater | | NP | 1896 | 1902 | Northern Pacific Railway | |
| Wadena and Park Rapids Railroad | | GN | 1883 | 1891 | St. Paul, Minneapolis and Manitoba Railway | |
| Watonwan Valley Railway | | CNW | 1899 | 1899 | Chicago, St. Paul, Minneapolis and Omaha Railway | |
| Western Railroad of Minnesota | | NP | 1874 | 1883 | St. Paul and Northern Pacific Railway | |
| Willmar and Sioux Falls Railway | | GN | 1886 | 1907 | Great Northern Railway | |
| Winona Bridge Railway | | CB&Q | 1890 | 1985 | N/A | |
| Winona and La Crosse Railroad | | CGW | 1856 | 1872 | Winona and Southwestern Railway | |
| Winona, Mankato and New Ulm Railway | | CNW | 1870 | 1880 | Winona and St. Peter Railroad | |
| Winona and St. Peter Railroad | | CNW | 1862 | 1900 | Chicago and North Western Railway | |
| Winona and Southwestern Railway | | CGW | 1872 | 1894 | Winona and Western Railway | |
| Winona and Western Railway | | CGW | 1894 | 1901 | Wisconsin, Minnesota and Pacific Railroad | |
| Wisconsin Central Company | | CP | 1888 | 1899 | Wisconsin Central Railway | |
| Wisconsin Central Railroad | | CP | 1954 | 1961 | Soo Line Railroad | |
| Wisconsin Central Railway | | CP | 1897 | 1954 | Wisconsin Central Railroad | |
| Wisconsin, Minnesota and Pacific Railroad | | CGW | 1894 | 1920 | Chicago Great Western Railroad | |
| Wisconsin, Minnesota and Pacific Railway | | CGW | 1883 | 1894 | Wisconsin, Minnesota and Pacific Railroad | |
| Worthington and Sioux Falls Railroad | | CNW | 1878 | 1879 | St. Paul and Sioux City Railroad | |

Electric

- Duluth Street Railway
- Duluth–Superior Traction Company
- Fargo and Moorhead Street Railway
- Granite City Railway
- Interstate Traction Company
- Lakeside Railway
- Lyndale Railway
- Mankato Electric Traction Company
- Mesaba Railway
- Minneapolis and St. Paul Suburban Railroad
- Minneapolis and St. Paul Suburban Railway
- Minneapolis, Anoka and Cuyuna Range Railroad (MA&C, MACR)
- Minneapolis, Anoka and Cuyuna Range Railway (MA&C)
- Minneapolis, Lyndale and Lake Calhoun Railway
- Minneapolis, Lyndale and Minnetonka Railway
- Minneapolis Street Railway
- Park Point Traction Company
- St. Paul City Railway
- St. Paul Southern Electric Railway
- Superior Rapid Transit Railway
- Twin City Rapid Transit Company
- Wahpeton–Breckenridge Street Railway
- Winnoa Railway and Light Company
- Woodland Railway

Private

- Itasca Lumber Company
