= List of reporting marks: M =

Note: Marks ending in U are for container owners; marks ending in X are not common carriers; marks ending in Z are for trailers without flanged wheels. All other marks are of common-carrier railroads.

== M ==
- MAA - Magma Arizona Railroad
- MAAX - Maxx Leasing Company
- MACX - Mac Acquisitions
- MADU - Magnum Speditionsgelleshaft
- MAEU - Maersk Lines
- MAGX - Magnimet, Monroe Scrap Division
- MAIX - Macon Iron and Paper Stock
- MAJU - Malaysian International Shipping Corporation
- MALX - Mid-America Locomotive and Car Repair
- MALZ - American President Lines
- MANX - Manchester Gas Company; Williams Energy Ventures
- MAPX - MAPCO Products Company; Williams Energy Ventures
- MARX - MidAmerican Energy Corporation
- MARZ - MARTRAC
- MASX - GE Rail Services
- MATU - Matson Navigation Company
- MATX - Merchants Investment Company
- MATZ - Matson Navigation Company
- MAW - Maumee and Western Railroad
- MAXU - Maxu Containers
- MAXX - MidAmerican Energy Company
- MAYW - Maywood and Sugar Creek
- MB - Meridian & Bigbee Railroad
- MBBX - Tank Car Services
- MBCX - MBCX Leasing
- MBFX - MBF Industries
- MBIX - Morse Brothers
- MBKX - MRC Rail Services
- MBLX - Exxon-Mobil Corporation
- MBPX - MacMillan-Bloedell
- MBRR - Meridian & Bigbee Railroad
- MBSX - Mid-South Bulk Services
- MBT - Marianna and Blountstown Railroad
- MBTX - Massachusetts Bay Transportation Authority
- MC - Michigan Central Railroad; New York Central Railroad; Penn Central; Maine Coast Railroad (1991-2000); Massachusetts Coastal Railroad (2007-)
- MCCX - Mount Vernon Coal Transfer Company; Mount Vernon Transfer Terminal
- MCDX - Redland Worth Corporation; Sunbelt Cement
- MCER - Massachusetts Central Railroad
- MCEU - Massachusetts Central Railroad
- MCEZ - Massachusetts Central Railroad
- MCHX - Trinity Rail Management
- MCIX - Mobley Company (Applied Chemicals Division)
- MCLR - McLaughlin Line Railroad
- MCLX - Morrison Car Leasing
- MCMU - Management Control and Maintenance
- MCMX - MC Rail Services
- MCPX - Monsanto Company; Solutia
- MCR - McCloud River Railroad; McCloud Railway
- MCRR - Monongahela Connecting Railroad
- MCRX - Marcus Rail Transport
- MCRY - Mid Continent Railway
- MCSA - Moscow, Camden and San Augustine Railroad
- MCSU - China Ocean Shipping Company
- MCTA - Minnesota Central Railroad
- MCTX - Modern Continental Construction Company
- MCVX - Massachusetts Call Volunteer Firefighters' Association
- MD - Municipal Docks
- MDAX - Merchants Despatch Transportation Corporation
- MDCX - Mexicana De Cobre, SA de CV
- MDDE - Maryland and Delaware Railroad
- MDDX - Old Line Holding Company
- MDIX - Modern Dispersions
- MDKX - Gardau MRM Steel (Mandak Metal Processors Division)
- MDLR - Midland Terminal Company
- MDP - Mexican Pacific Railroad (Ferrocarril Mexicano del Pacifico)
- MDR - Kansas City Southern Railway
- MDS - Meridian Southern Railway
- MDSB - Burlington Northern Railroad
- MDSZ - Medspan Shipping Service
- MDT - Merchants Despatch Transportation Corporation
- MDTX - Merchants Despatch Refrigerator Line
- MDW - Minnesota, Dakota & Western Railway
- MDWU - Minnesota, Dakota & Western Railway
- MDWZ - Minnesota, Dakota & Western Railway
- ME - Morristown & Erie Railway
- MEC - Maine Central Railroad; Pan Am Railways
- MECX - Trinity Rail Management
- MEDU - Mediterranean Shipping Company
- MEFX - MexFresh
- MEFZ - MexFresh
- MELX - Sunbelt Cement
- MEPX - McGraw-Edison Company
- MERR - Maine Eastern Railroad
- MERX - Merco
- MESX - Mears/CPG
- MET - Modesto and Empire Traction Company
- METW - Municipality of East Troy Wisconsin
- METX - Northeast Illinois Regional Commuter Railroad Corporation (Metra)
- MF - Middle Fork Railroad
- MFCX - Farmers Coop Grain and Supply Company; First Union Rail
- MFFX - M4 Holdings
- MG - Mobile and Gulf Railroad
- MGA - Monongahela Railway; Norfolk Southern
- MGGU - Marcevaggi
- MGMX - J and J Partnership
- MGRI - MG Rail
- MGRS - Ferrocarriles Nacionales de Mexico
- MGRX - M&G Resins USA, LLC
- MGSX - Martin Gas Sales; CF Martin Sulphur
- MH - Mount Hood Railroad
- MHAX - United States Department of the Interior (Bureau of Mines Helium Field Operations)
- MHCO - Marquette and Huron Mountain Railroad
- MHFX - MHF Logistical Solutions
- MHLX - General American Transportation Corporation
- MHM - Norfolk Southern
- MHQU - Military Sealift Command (Washington, DC)
- MHQZ - Military Sealift Command
- MHRX - Mile-High Railcar Services
- MHWA - Mohawk, Adirondack and Northern Railroad
- MI - Missouri-Illinois Railroad; Missouri Pacific Railroad; Union Pacific
- MICO - Midland Continental Railroad
- MID - Midway Railroad
- MIDH - Middletown and Hummelstown Railroad
- MIDL - Midland Railway
- MIDX - MRC Rail Services
- MIEU - MI Engineering
- MIGN - Michigan Northern Railway
- MILW - Milwaukee Road; Soo Line Railroad; Canadian Pacific Railway
- MILX - Milchem; GE Rail Services Corporation
- MILZ - Soo Line Railroad, Canadian Pacific Railway
- MIMX - Minera Mexico International
- MINE - Minneapolis Eastern Railway
- MINU - China Ocean Shipping Company
- MIPX - Millennium Petrochemicals
- MIR - Minneapolis Industrial Railway
- MIRX - Regional Recycling
- MIS - Mississippi Central Railroad
- MISS - Mississippian Railway
- MISU - Malaysian International Shipping Corporation
- MISX - Milwaukee Solvents and Chemicals Corporation
- MJ - Manufacturers' Junction Railway
- MJRX - M Ryan Railway Service Contractors
- MJVU - Merco
- MKC - McKeesport Connecting Railroad
- MKCX - Morrison-Knudsen
- MKFX - Century Rail Enterprises
- MKIX - M-K Railroad Equipment Leasing Company; Morrison-Knudsen
- MKNR - Mackenzie Northern Railway
- MKT - Missouri-Kansas-Texas Railroad; Union Pacific
- MKTT - Missouri-Kansas-Texas Railroad; Union Pacific
- MKTZ - Union Pacific
- MLCU - NYK Line
- MLCX - American Refrigerator Transit Company
- MLD - Midland Railway Co. of Manitoba
- MLEX - Miles
- MLHX - American Refrigerator Transit Company
- MLIX - Melbo Land and Investment Company
- MLLX - Montell USA, Basell USA
- MLMX - Morrison Grain Company; Metal Management
- MLRX - Maddie’s Locomotive Leasing & Resale
- MLSX - Monsanto Company
- MLUX - Solutia
- MMA - Montreal, Maine & Atlantic Railway
- MMAC - Montreal, Maine & Atlantic Railway
- MMAX - Martin Marietta Aluminum; Martin Marietta Corporation
- MMBX - Martin Marietta Corporation; Master Builders
- MMCU - CIE Des Messageries Maritimes
- MMCX - M&M Chemical Products; TransMatrix
- MMID - Maryland Midland Railway
- MMMU - Fesco Pacific Lines
- MMMX - Minnesota Mining and Manufacturing (3M)
- MMRR - Mid-Michigan Railroad
- MMRX - Double M Ranch Enterprises
- MMSX - Blue Circle
- MMXZ - Murphy Motor Express
- MNA - Missouri & Northern Arkansas Railroad
- MNAX - C and S Directional Boring
- MNBR - Meridian & Bigbee Railroad
- MNC - Missouri North Central Railroad
- MNCW - Metro-North Commuter Railroad
- MNCX - Minnesota Corn Processors
- MNJ - Middletown and New Jersey Railway
- MNLU - Malaysian International Shipping Corporation
- MNLX - Exxon-Mobil Corporation
- MNN - Minnesota Northern Railroad
- MNNR - Minnesota Commercial Railway
- MNPX - Morton Norwich Products; Morton International
- MNRX - Northstar Line
- MNS - Minneapolis, Northfield and Southern Railway; Soo Line Railroad; Canadian Pacific Railway
- MNTX - Minnesota Transportation Museum
- MNWX - Minnesota Department of Public Service (Weights and Measures Division)
- MOBX - Mobil Oil Corporation; Exxon-Mobil Corporation
- MOC - Missouri Central Railroad
- MOCX - Missouri Portland Cement Company
- MOD - Missouri Pacific Railroad
- MOEX - Morgan Engineering
- MOFX - Maxton Oil and Fertilizer Company
- MOGX - C.W. Brooks
- MOHX - Monsanto Company; Solutia
- MOLU - Mitsui OSK Lines
- MOLX - International Molasses Corporation
- MON - Monon Railroad; Seaboard System Railroad; CSX Transportation
- MONX - Monsanto Company; Solutia
- MOPZ - Flexi-Van Leasing
- MORZ - Mitsui OSK Lines
- MOSX - Mosinee Paper Corporation
- MOSZ - Mitsui OSK Lines
- MOT - Marine Oil Transportation
- MOTC - Montreal Tramways
- MOTU - Monsanto
- MOTX - National Museum of Transportation
- MOTZ - Mitsui OSK Lines
- MOWX - Fortaleza Construction Company
- MOXV - Moxahala Valley Railway
- MP - Missouri Pacific Railroad; Union Pacific
- MPA - Maryland and Pennsylvania Railroad; York Railway
- MPCX - Moyer Packing Company; Michels Pipeline Construction
- MPEX - MotivePower
- MPIT - Missouri Pacific;Union Pacific
- MPIX - Myer's Propane Gas Service; MotivePower
- MPLI - Minnesota Prairie Line
- MPLX - GE Rail Services
- MPLZ - Union Pacific
- MPRX - Motive Power & Equipment Solutions
- MPSX - Missouri Public Service
- MPTX - Procor
- MPU - Missouri Pacific Railroad, Union Pacific
- MPWX - Muscatine Power and Water
- MPZ - Union Pacific
- MQCX - Monarch Cement Company
- MQGX - Morrison-Quirk Grain Corporation
- MQPX - Millennium Inorganic Chemicals
- MQRX - Macquarie Rail, Inc.; Wells Fargo Rail
- MQT - Marquette Rail
- MR - McCloud River Railroad; McLeod Railway
- MRAX - Mineral Range
- MRCX - Evans Railcar Leasing Company; GE Rail Services Corporation
- MRDX - MidAmerican Energy Company
- MREX - Marshall Railway Equipment Corporation; Monad Railway Equipment Company
- MRHS - Midland Railway
- MRI - Mohall Railroad
- MRIX - Motive Rail Industries
- MRL - Montana Rail Link
- MRMX - Midwest Railcar Corporation (previously named MRM Leasing and Management)
- MRMZ - Monticello Railway Museum
- MRR - Carolina Southern Railroad
- MRRX - GE Rail Services; Murphy Road Recycling
- MRS - Manufacturers Railway Company; Anheuser-Busch
- MRSX - Mile-High Railcar Services
- MS - Michigan Shore Railroad
- MSAX - Midwest Steel and Alloy
- MSAZ - National Motor Freight Traffic Association
- MSC - Illinois Central Gulf Railroad (Mississippi Central, Hattiesburg to Natchez)
- MSCI - Mississippi Central Railroad (Oxford to Grand Jct)
- MSCU - Mediterranean Shipping Company
- MSCZ - Mediterranean Shipping Company
- MSDR - Mississippi Delta Railroad, Rock Island Rail
- MSDU - Mediterranean Shipping Company
- MSE - Mississippi Export Railroad
- MSEX - Princess Tours
- MSIX - Morton International
- MSKU - Maersk Line
- MSL - Montgomery Short Line
- MSLC - Minnesota Short Lines Company
- MSMU - Mediterranean Shipping Company
- MSMX - Mid South Milling Company
- MSN - Meeker Southern Railroad
- MSO - Michigan Southern Railroad
- MSPX - P4 Productions
- MSQU - Military Sealift Command (Bayonne, New Jersey)
- MSR - Mississippi Southern Railroad (Watco)
- MSRC - Kansas City Southern Railway (former MidSouth Railcorp)
- MSRW - Mississippian Railway
- MSTL - Minneapolis and St. Louis Railway; Chicago & North Western Railway; Union Pacific
- MSTR - Massena Terminal Railroad
- MSTX - Steam Railroading Institute
- MSUU - USPCI
- MSV - Mississippi and Skuna Valley Railroad
- MSWY - Minnesota Southern Railway
- MT - Mississippi and Tennessee RailNet
- MTAX - MTAX Corporation
- MTC - Mystic Terminal Company
- MTCO - Macon Terminal Company
- MTCX - Mallard Transportation Company
- MTCZ - Mayflower Transit and Storage
- MTDX - Midwest Transportation and Development Company
- MTFR - Minnesota Transfer Railway
- MTIU - Welfit Oddy
- MTIZ - American Marine Industries
- MTLU - Montgomery Tank Lines
- MTLX - Metal Link International
- MTMU - March
- MTMX - Modern Track Machinery
- MTNX - Rocky Mountain Transportation Services
- MTPX - Montana Power Company
- MTR - Montour Railroad; Youngstown and Southeastern Railroad
- MTRX - TransMatrix
- MTSU - Marine Transport Service
- MTTX - Trailer Train Company; TTX Company
- MTW - Marinette, Tomahawk and Western Railroad
- MTZ - Mitsui OSK Lines; Montgomery Tank
- MTZX - Mitsui Rail Capital LLC
- MULX - MUL Railcars Leasing LLC
- MUSC - Memphis Union Station Company
- MV - Midland Valley Railroad
- MVCX - Chaparral Energy
- MVP - Missouri and Valley Park Railroad
- MVRY - Mahoning Valley Railway
- MVT - Mount Vernon Terminal
- MWAX - Martin Marietta Materials
- MWBX - Midwest By-Products Company
- MWCL - Midwest Coal Handling
- MWCX - Midwest Railcar Corporation
- MWHX - Markwest Hydrocarbon Partners
- MWLX - Midwest Locomotive Leasing and Sales
- MWLZ - Madrigal-Wan Hai Lines Corporation
- MWMX - Midwest Mud Company; Golden Leasing
- MWPX - Murco Wall Products
- MWR - Muncie and Western Railroad
- MWRC - Mount Washington Railway
- MWRL - Molalla Western Railway; Hillvista Investment Company
- MWRR - Montana Western Railway
- MWRX - Midwest Rail
- MWSX - Midwest Solvents Company; GE Rail Services
- MWTT - Michigan-Wisconsin Transportation Company
- MXLU - Mexican Line
- MZIZ - Marko B Zanovich
