= Minnesota Rail Service Improvement Program =

The Minnesota Rail Service Improvement Program (MRSI) was created in 1976 to improve Minnesota railroad services. Funding for the MRSI Program was authorized in 1978 and in 1982, a constitutional amendment provided for bonds to be used for the MRSI Program. The program has received general fund appropriations totaling US$16 million and bond appropriations totaling $25.5 million over the life of the program. The 2003 Legislature rescinded $3.9 million on July 1, 2003, and another $2.5 million was taken on July 1, 2004. This deduction from the MRSI Program will decrease the general fund appropriations to $9.6 million.
