= MDW (disambiguation) =

MDW could refer to:

- 59th Medical Wing, a U.S. Air Force medical wing, Joint Base San Antonio, Texas, U.S.
- Midway International Airport (IATA Airport Code), Chicago, Illinois, U.S.
- United States Army Military District of Washington
- Milwaukee District West Line (MDW), a Metra commuter rail line in Chicago, Illinois, U.S.
- Minnesota, Dakota and Western Railway, U.S. and Canada
- University of Music and Performing Arts Vienna (German: Universität für Musik und darstellende Kunst Wien), a music university in Vienna, Austria
- Maidstone West railway station
- An abbreviation for meadow, usually in a street name (as in Castle Mdw in Norwich).
