= Lucian Sprague =

American railroad executive

Lucian C. Sprague (1882–1960) was an American railroad executive. Sprague was born in Serena, Illinois, on September 29, 1882, and during his early years held a variety of railroad jobs, including stints at the Chicago, Burlington and Quincy, Great Northern, and Baltimore and Ohio. In 1922, he was hired by the Uintah Railway, a remarkable and remote narrow gauge short line in the mountains along the Colorado-Utah border. Sprague remained at the Uintah for most of the decade, becoming the line's general manager.

In 1935, Sprague was appointed co-receiver of the bankrupt Minneapolis and St. Louis Railway (M&StL), a mid-sized railroad that extended south and west from Minneapolis. The M&StL had struggled financially for years, and by the 1930s was threatened with liquidation; Sprague, however, managed to turn the company around, and the railroad's twenty-year receivership ended in 1943. Sprague was named president of the M&StL at the end of receivership, and he held that position until being ousted in a dramatic 1954 shareholders battle orchestrated by Benjamin W. Heineman.

Sprague died of a heart attack in Minneapolis on August 3, 1960.
