= Eastern Railway of Minnesota =

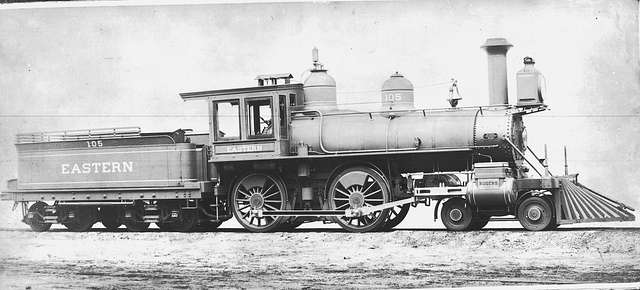
Locomotive #105 of the Eastern Railway of Minnesota

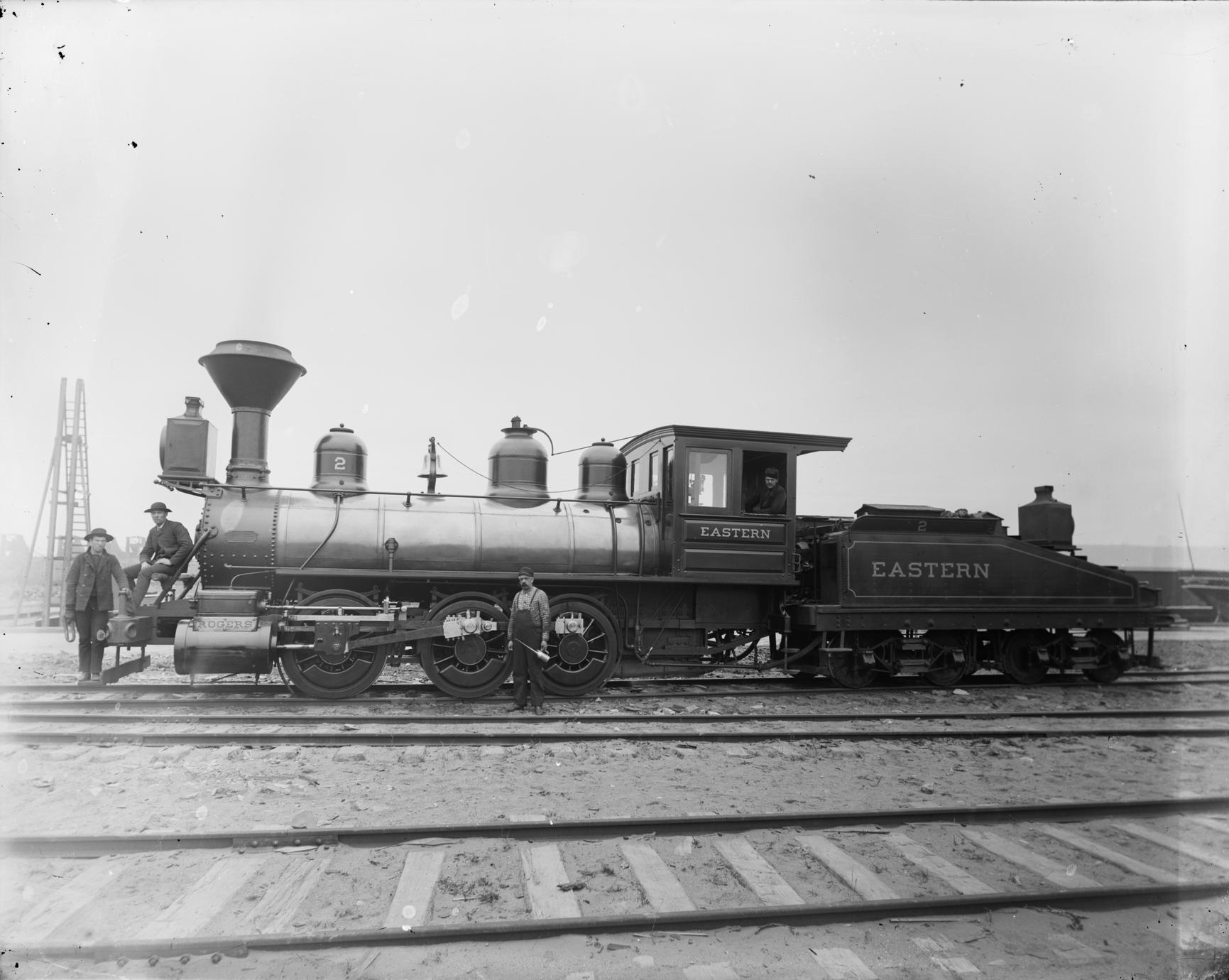
Locomotive #2 of the Eastern Minnesota Railway at the Superior, WI railyard

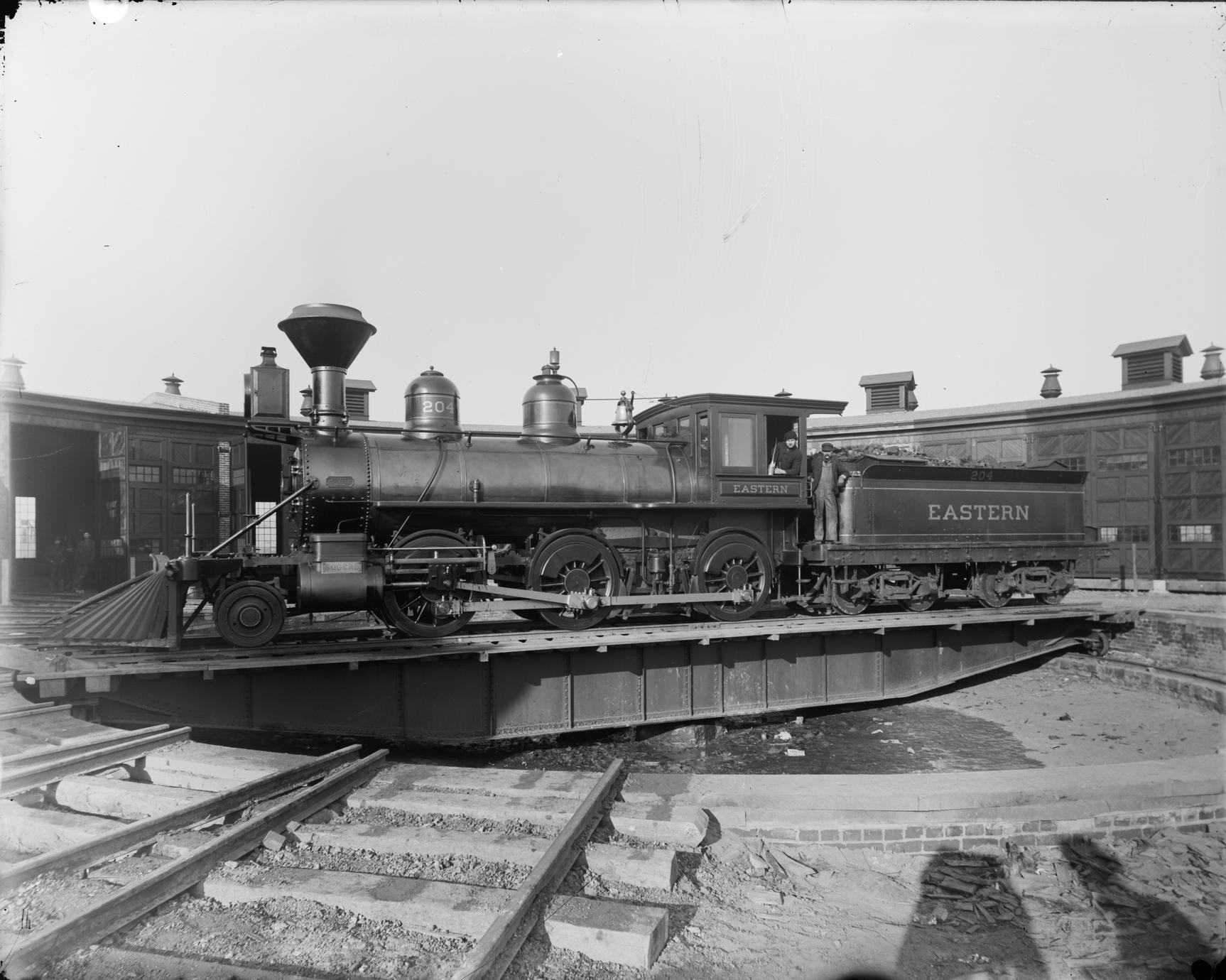
Eastern Railway of Minnesota #204 on the roundhouse turntable at Superior, WI

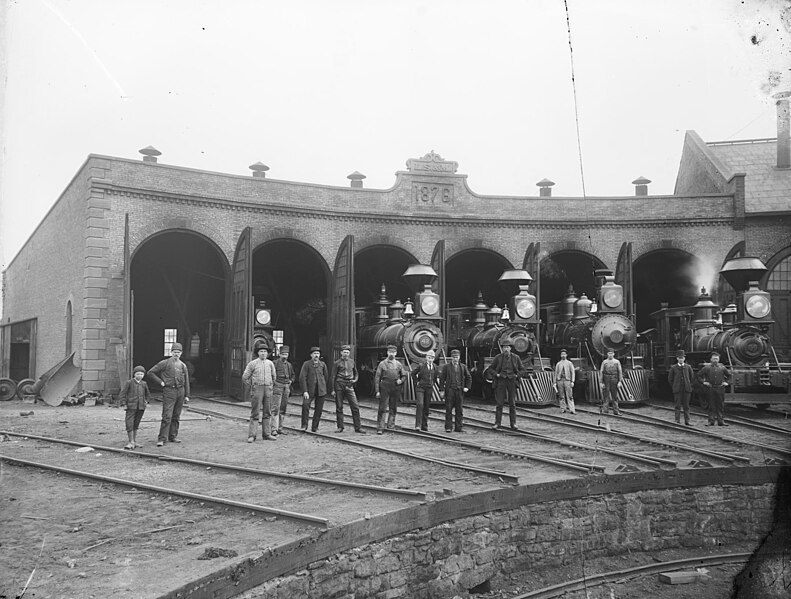
Eastern Minnesota Railway locomotives under steam at a brick roundhouse

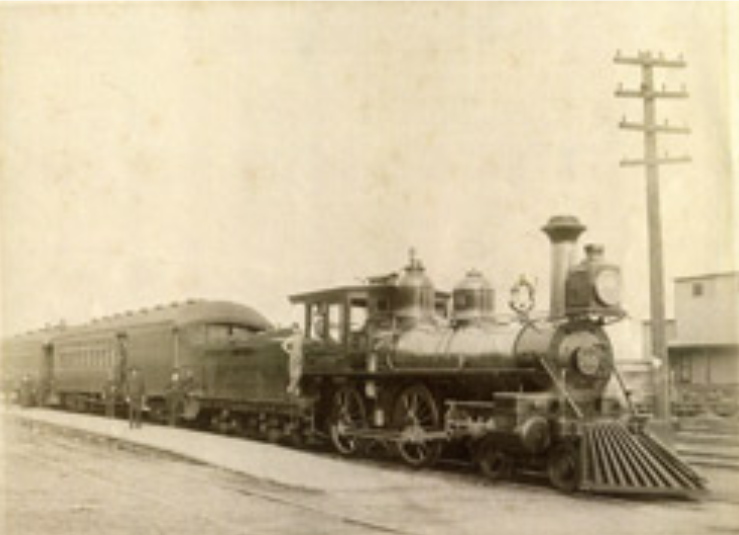
Engineer William Best at the throttle of an Eastern Minnesota Railway passenger train.

The Eastern Railway of Minnesota (commonly known as the "Eastern Minnesota Railway", "Duluth Short Line" or simply "The Eastern") was a railway company that operated in the US states of Minnesota and Wisconsin between 1887 and 1907. Its main line ran between Superior, Wisconsin and Hinckley, Minnesota, roughly parallel with the St Paul & Duluth Railroad's line between Hinckley and Duluth, with a short branch line at Sandstone, Minnesota which served the town's logging mill and sandstone quarry. During its later years, the Eastern was controlled by the Great Northern Railway, which ultimately purchased and absorbed the railway entirely in 1907. It existed as a private entity with no physical equipment or property until 1959, when it was dissolved. Today, the Eastern's line is in service as part of the BNSF system.

== Formation ==
The Eastern Railway of Minnesota was formed in 1887 to build a railroad line between Hinckley, Minnesota and the St. Louis River. One year later it was consolidated with the Lake Superior & Southwestern in Wisconsin and received access to terminal and dock facilities in Superior. Construction on the railroad was funded in part by James J. Hill, who intended early on to use the line in conjunction with his Minneapolis & St. Cloud as a gateway to the steamship ports in Duluth. when the railroad opened, Hill's Great Northern had acquired control, but the company itself was largely an independent enterprise.

== Traffic and competition ==
Lumber, iron ore and agricultural products were the main sources of freight revenue for the Eastern Minnesota Railway, as many records indicate that large amounts of these commodities were regularly hauled over its rails. Sandstone was also carried from a mine on the railroad's short branch at the town of Sandstone. It was also a popular choice for passengers traveling between Lake Superior and the Twin Cities. At least one of these train, the "Eastern Limited", ran on GN tracks south of Hinckley to reach St. Paul. The Eastern faced competition with the neighboring St. Paul & Duluth railroad, whose Duluth-Hinckley division ran geographically parallel to the Eastern's line. Despite having been built at a later date, the Eastern's line was shorter than the St.P&D's line, leading to it eventually handling all rail traffic in the area while the St.P&D was phased out and largely abandoned. At least part of the line has been turned into the Willard-Munger State Trail.

== The Great Hinckley Fire ==
At the time of the 1894 Hinckley Fire, the town was served by three railroads: The Minneapolis & St. Cloud (Great Northern), the St. Paul & Duluth, and the Eastern Minnesota Railway. Two of the Eastern's trains would prove instrumental in saving a number of refugees from the

The first train involved was the Eastern's southbound Superior-Hinckley Freighter, Consisting of engine #105, three empty boxcars and a caboose. It was being run by engineer Edward Barry, who knew that something was wrong the moment he rolled into town. After refueling his engine, he moved the train onto a side track as there was another train, the "Eastern Limited" bound for St Paul, coming into town not far behind his own. This was to be the second train involved in the evacuations, and it was being run by engineer William Best. By the time Best arrived in Hinckley and brought his train to a halt, the town had already begun to burn. As Best's fireman refueled their engine, his conductor, a man named George Powers, spotted Barry's train idling on the siding nearby. He had an idea and said that they should hook the two trains together, using Best's coaches and Barry's empty boxcars to carry people, and run out of town to safety. The two engineers agreed, and Barry reversed his train off of the side track and hooked it to the last coach of Best's train. Their run to safety would have to be made in reverse, with two flagmen and conductors of both trains riding on the tender of Barry's engine acting as lookouts. The townsfolk rushed towards the train and piled on board as the fire advanced through the town and towards the train station. When Barry started to back up, Best stopped the train by applying the air brakes. Despite everyone demanding that he release the brakes, Best refused to do so for several minutes, an action which saved hundreds of lives. The refugee train backed out of town and crossed the grindstone river before making a quick stop to pick up another group of refugees. After rushing through 5 miles of burning forests they arrived at the town of Sandstone, where they tried in vain to convince the townsfolk to board the train. They then crossed over the Kettle River bridge, which had caught fire shortly before the train reached it. A flagman who was stationed at the bridge told the engineers that they could still cross if they started immediately, and the train barely made it across before the entire structure collapsed in on itself. The train continued onward with the fire still hot on its heels, stopping at several towns along the line to take on additional refugees. By the time the train rolled back into superior, there were over 800 people on board, all saved thanks to the heroic actions of engineers Barry and Best.

"A (Passenger) train came steaming in on the Eastern Minnesota's rail line, and on this [train] about 500 people were saved, who otherwise certainly would have died. The train itself was not sufficient in order to be able to carry all of the refugees, but one knew what to do. A number of freight cars and a caboose stood coupled together with a freight locomotive on an adjoining track a little ways in the woods, was coupled on the other end of the passenger train. Now equipped with two locomotives, the train steamed away in the direction of Superior again, loaded with as many people as the cars could accommodate."
