= Massachusetts Call Volunteer Firefighters' Association =

The Massachusetts Call/Volunteer Firefighters' Association (MCVFA) represents more than 3400 call and volunteer firefighters and other emergency services personnel across the Commonwealth. The primary objective of this organization is to promote the welfare of Call and Volunteer Fire/EMS Companies and their members by rendering assistance of every type and nature whenever possible.

On February 26, 1990, a group of 40 Call/Volunteer Firefighters representing 14 Southeastern Massachusetts fire departments met in Carver to discuss the concept of starting a Statewide Call/Volunteer Firefighters' Association. This meeting was organized by the Carver Firefighters Association and Carver Fire Chief, Dana E. Harriman.

The meeting produced some lively and colorful discussions. Still, one base theme kept coming to the forefront: the Call/Volunteers in the state were headed in the wrong direction. In late 1987 Call/Volunteer Firefighters were excluded from previously enjoyed death and disability benefits under the state retirement law. In 1989 Call/Volunteers were categorically excluded from being members of the district Haz-Mat teams in conjunction with the State funded Haz-Mat vehicles.

It became apparent from this meeting that the Call/Volunteers lacked organization and adequate representation in matters concerning them on the state level. It was unanimously voted to set up a Steering Committee to report back to the group with recommendations. On April 23, 1990, the Steering Committee Report was presented and unanimously accepted with a couple of minor modifications.

On April 30, 1990, this group met again and decided to do a mailing to survey the cities and towns across the state to solicit representation that would make this a true Massachusetts Call/Volunteer Firefighters' Association.

The group met many times that spring and summer, and the surveys came rolling in.

After much preparation, the first State Meeting was held in West Boylston on October 14, 1990. This meeting formalized a working set of bylaws and a basic Constitution for MCVFA. From the original 14 departments, it has grown to over 3400 members representing more than 130 fire departments and emergency services organizations.

The current President is Thomas Burnett of the Whitman MA Fire Department.
