= Cedar River Railroad =

Overview
- Headquarters: Waterloo, IA
- Reporting mark: CEDR
- Locale: Minnesota, Iowa
- Dates of operation: 1991–
- Successor: Canadian National Railway

Technical
- Track gauge: 4 ft 8 1/2 in (1,435 mm) standard gauge

The Cedar River Railroad (reporting mark CEDR) is a shortline subsidiary of the Canadian National Railway that operates on former Illinois Central Gulf Railroad trackage. In 1991, the railroad was formed as a reorganization of the bankrupt Cedar Valley Railroad, which had begun operations in 1984. It was owned by the Chicago Central and Pacific Railroad, itself an ICG spin-off that was reacquired by the successor Illinois Central Railroad in 1996.

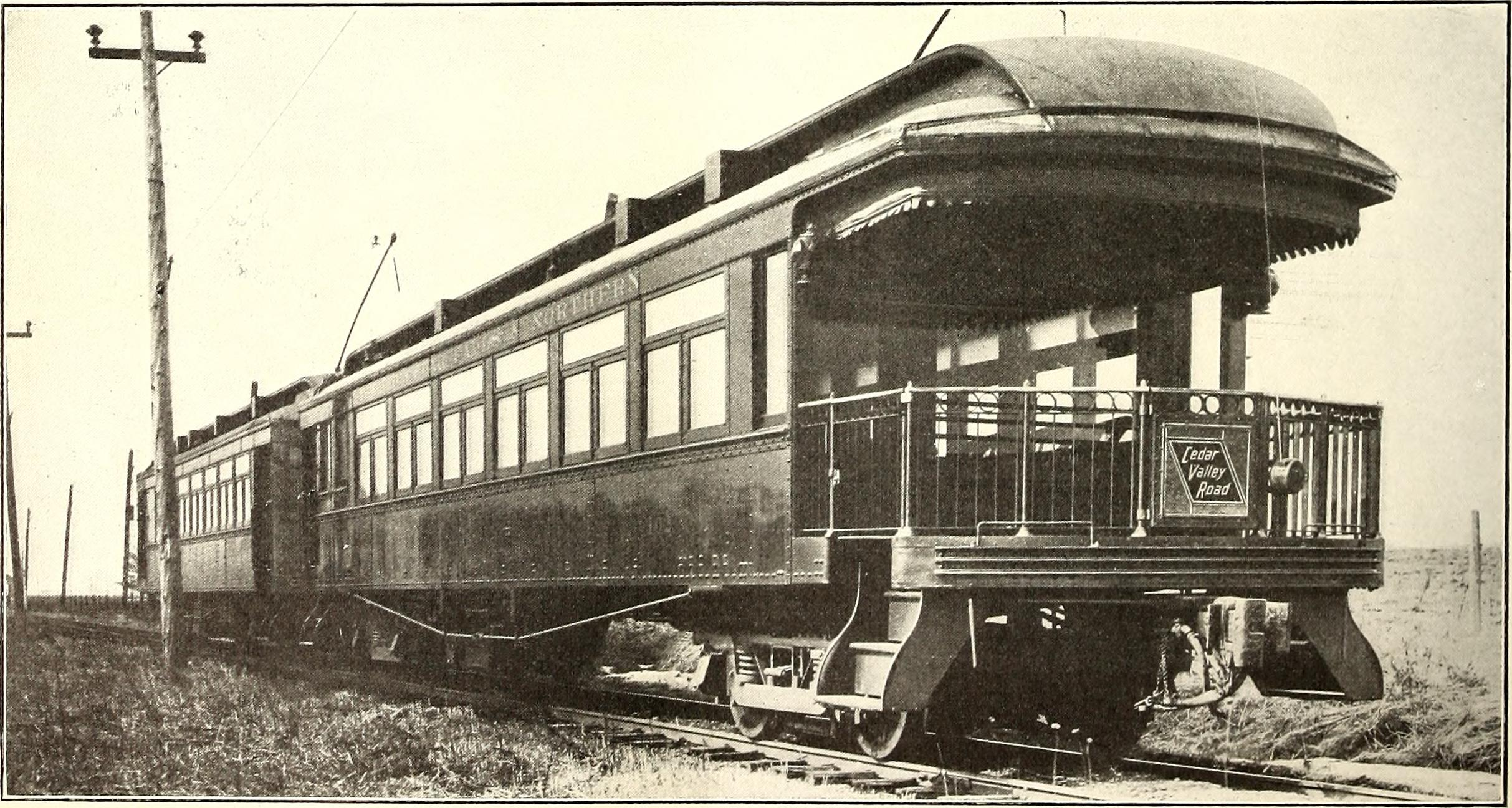
Parlor car in 1915

The railroad has connections with the Union Pacific Railroad in Glenville, Minnesota, Iowa, Chicago and Eastern Railroad in Charles City, Iowa and Lyle, Minnesota, and Chicago Central and Pacific Railroad at Waterloo, Iowa.
