= Granite City Railway =

Street railway in Minnesota

The Granite City Railway was an American street railway that ran in St. Cloud and Sauk Rapids, Minnesota.
