= Benjamin W. Heineman =

Benjamin W. Heineman (February 10, 1914 – August 5, 2012) was an attorney and American railroad executive. Heineman first attended the University of Michigan (1930-1933), and later attended Northwestern's school of law. He first gained attention in the railroad industry in 1954, when he orchestrated a successful proxy battle for control of the Minneapolis and St. Louis Railway. He became president of the Chicago and North Western Railway (CNW) in 1956, leading the railroad through a series of difficult cost-cutting measures that returned the railroad to solvency. One of the measures he instituted was to sell shares in the railroad to the railroad's own employees, prompting the "Employee Owned" inscription in the railroad's logo. This process was consummated in 1972, at which time Larry Provo succeeded Heineman as president of the company. Heineman remained in charge of the holding company Northwest Industries (owner of Fruit of the Loom, Acme Boots, and Velsicol Chemical Corporation) until 1985. He was elected to the American Philosophical Society in 2011.

Heineman is noted in the history of Chicago, Illinois, for replacing all the steam locomotives which brought passenger trains into North Western Station with diesel locomotives, in one day in 1956, in response to a complaint by Mayor Richard J. Daley about smoke and fumes emanating from the station. Heineman also replaced the North Western's entire passenger rolling stock used for commuter services with double deck "commuter streamliners".

Heineman served in various governmental roles in World War Two and was active in politics, working as a speechwriter for Adlai Stevenson in 1952, Chairman of the White House Conference on Civil Rights during the administration of Lyndon Johnson and Chairman of the Illinois Board of Higher Education. Heineman turned down several offers from President Johnson to serve in high-ranking positions including Budget Director and UN Ambassador, but remained an informal advisor.
