= Minnesota Transfer Railway =

Overview
- Reporting mark: MTFR
- Locale: Minneapolis and Saint Paul, Minnesota
- Dates of operation: 1883–1987
- Successor: Minnesota Commercial Railway

Technical
- Track gauge: 4 ft 8 1/2 in (1,435 mm) standard gauge
- Length: 100 miles

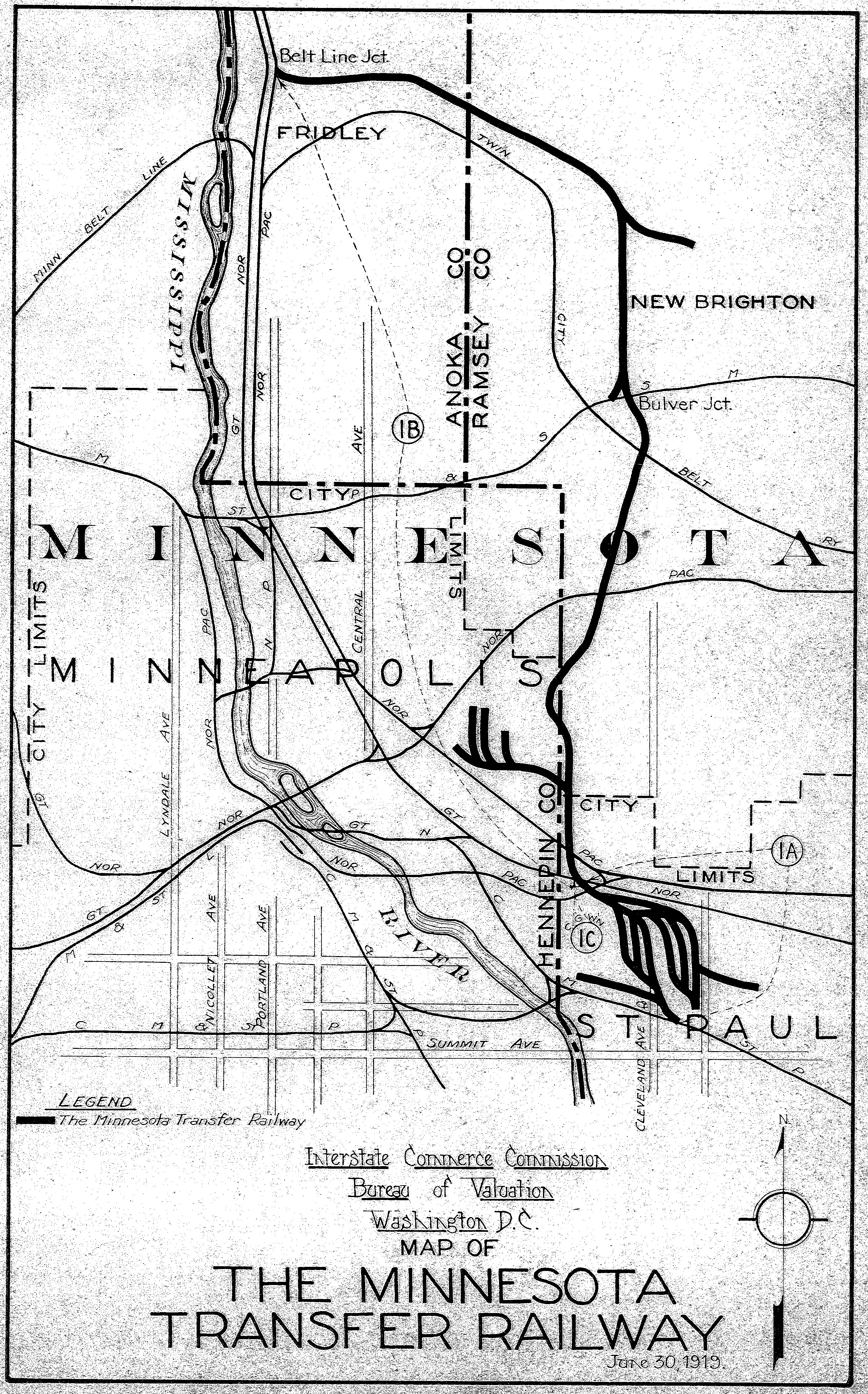
1919 map of the railroad

The Minnesota Transfer Railway (reporting mark MTFR) was a short line railroad in the United States. It was incorporated on March 22, 1883.

It was owned by nine major railroads serving the Twin Cities:

1. Chicago, Burlington and Quincy Railroad
2. Chicago Great Western Railway
3. Chicago, Milwaukee, St. Paul and Pacific Railroad
4. Chicago, Rock Island and Pacific Railroad
5. Chicago, St. Paul, Minneapolis and Omaha Railway
6. Great Northern Railway
7. Minneapolis and St. Louis Railway
8. Minneapolis, St. Paul and Sault Ste. Marie Railway
9. Northern Pacific Railway

It consisted of a junction from Merriam Park from the Milwaukee road, to the Great Northern Railway, where it ran along until it cut north to cross the Northern Pacific tracks. It went north to New Brighton to the Stockyards. The Minnesota Transfer Railway acquired the Minnesota Belt Line Railway in 1898. The belt line ran 14 miles from the Northern Pacific and Great Northern tracks in Fridley, called Belt Line Junction, to the Minneapolis stock yards in New Brighton.

The railroad provided transfer and terminal services to these railroads, as well as serving local industrial customers. It served to funnel up to 3,500 cars a day through the St. Paul freight yards as well as originating and delivering up to 400 carloads of freight from industries located on its lines.

The Midway yard which is part of it has 7 parts: • C yard - 27 tracks, westbound arrival tracks • J yard - 13 tracks, cars bound for local industries on the MTRY • P yard - 29 tracks, eastbound arrival, departure & classification tracks • A yard - 42 tracks, westbound classification & departure tracks • B yard - 8 tracks, arrival/departure tracks • F yard - storage tracks • R yard - RIP tracks

MTFR 200, an Alco RS-3, is preserved in operating condition at the Illinois Railway Museum. MTFR 62, one of five Alco S-1 on the MTFR, is preserved in stored condition at the Hub City Heritage Museum in Oelwein, Iowa.

Through a series of mergers over the years, by the 1960s it was owned by Great Northern, Northern Pacific, the Burlington Route, the Rock Island, the Milwaukee Road, the Soo Line Railroad, and the Chicago & Northwestern Railway. The former three merged in 1970 as the Burlington Northern Railroad. The MTR was acquired by the Minnesota Commercial Railway in 1987.
