= St. Paul and Duluth Railroad =

Railroad in Minnesota and Wisconsin, US

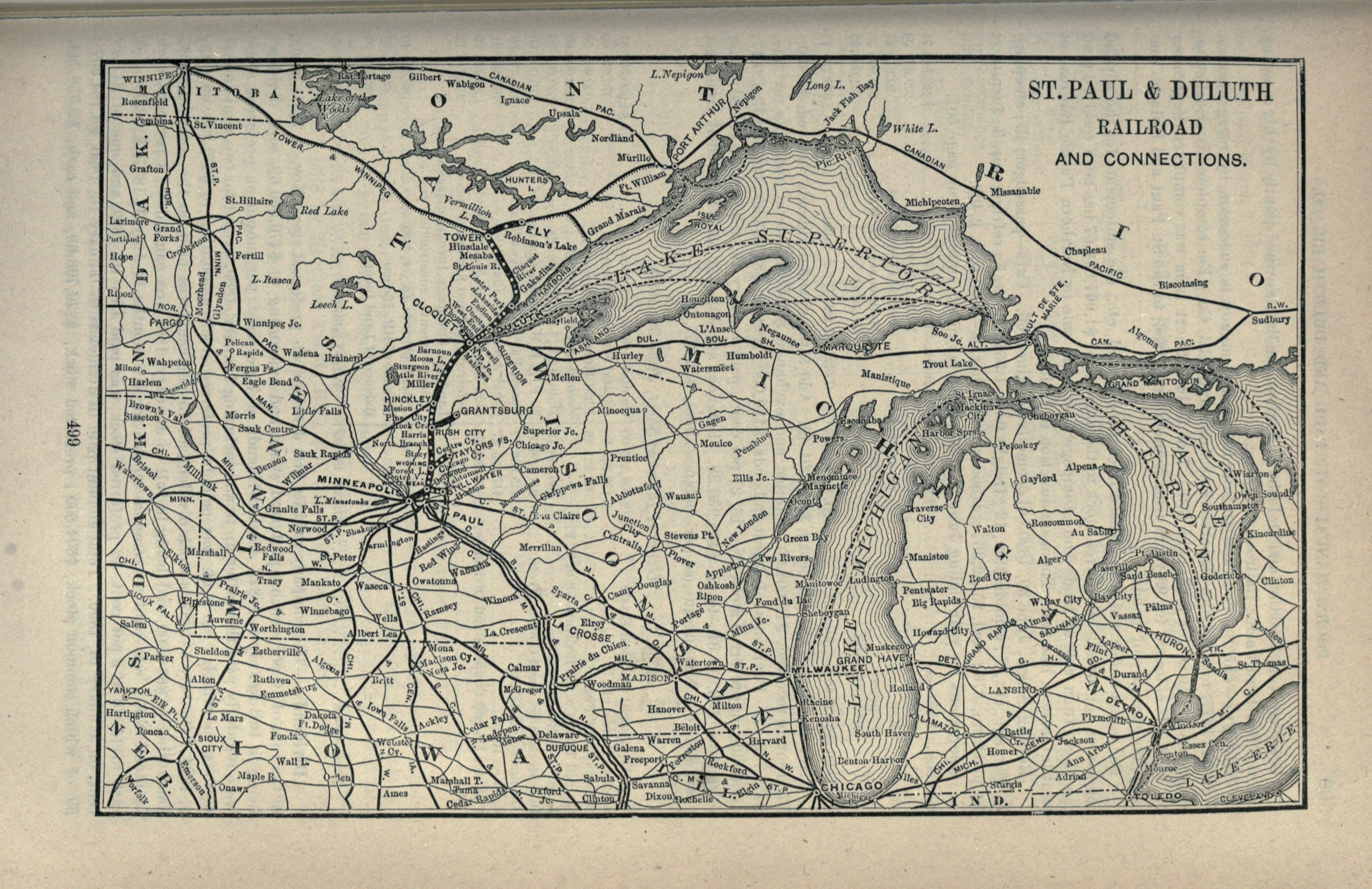
An 1891 map of the St.P&D Line.

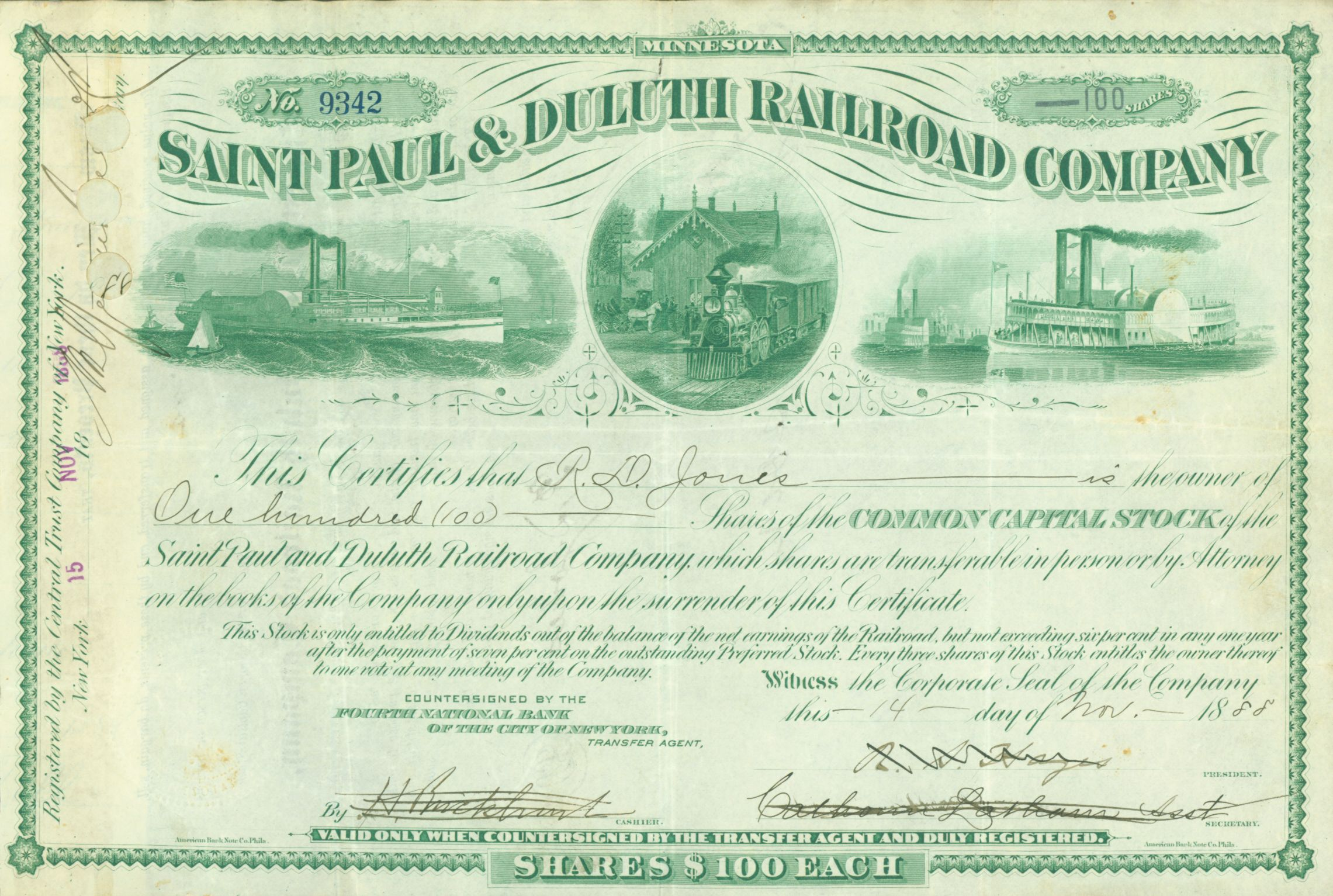
Share of the Saint Paul & Duluth Railroad Company, issued 14. November 1888

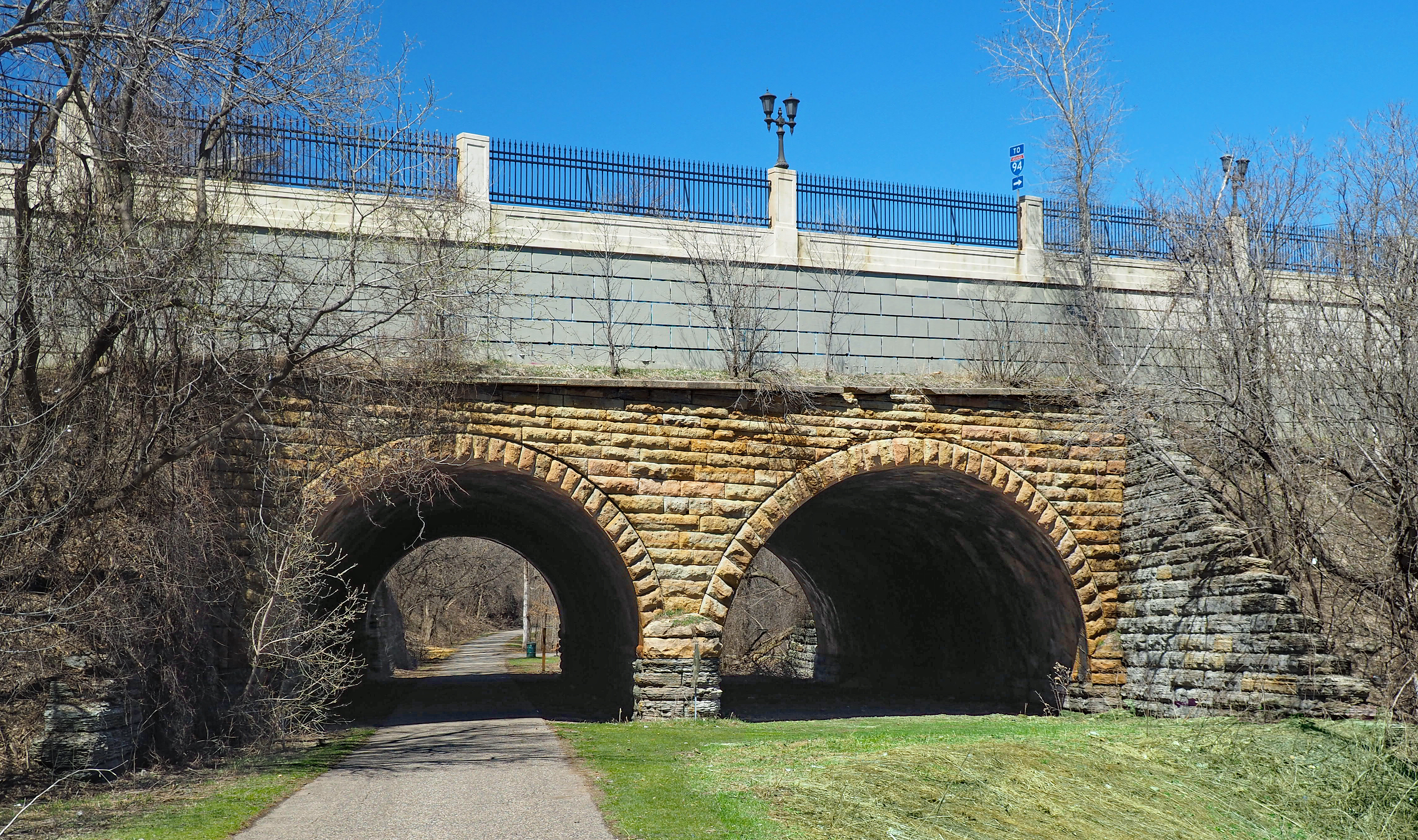
The Seventh Street Improvement Arches span the former right-of-way of the St. Paul and Duluth Railroad in Saint Paul.

The St. Paul and Duluth Railroad, a railroad in Minnesota and Wisconsin, operated independently from 1877, when it was reorganized from the Lake Superior and Mississippi Railroad, until 1900, when it was bought by the Northern Pacific Railway. It was nicknamed the "Skally Line", likely based upon the Anglicization of the Swedish word "skulle", meaning "would." Many Swedish immigrants "would" take the line, which ran from Saint Paul to Duluth, Minnesota, and had branches to the Minnesota destinations of Minneapolis, Taylors Falls, Kettle River and Cloquet; and the Wisconsin destinations of Grantsburg and Superior.

== Great Hinckley Fire ==
According to the St. Paul Pioneer Press 1964 publication "The Story of Minnesota" by staffer Jerry Fearing, the St. Paul and Duluth Railroad's Train N° 4, the "Duluth Limited" hauled by Steam Locomotive No. 69, was heading south to St. Paul from Duluth with 400 passengers aboard when the train arrived at Hinckley, Minnesota in the middle of the historic Great Hinckley Fire of 1894. The train's engineer, James Root, and his crew rescued several hundred people who were escaping from the fire and quickly reversed course racing through flames heading back north toward Duluth stopping at a swamp that locals called "Skunk Lake," now marked as a historical site on the Willard Munger State Trail (see below). The location thereupon is about 4.5 miles north of Hinckley and about 8.5 miles south of Finlayson, Minnesota. At that site, the crew, the escapees and the passengers took a respite and cooled off in the water on that fateful day.

Root suffered cuts from flying glass that came from bursting locomotive and passengers car windows in the intense heat. The engine was in reverse, so its cars were in front of the open rear of the cab on his steam locomotive. Therefore, smoke, flames, embers, and debris would come directly into the cab without protection. Today, locomotives are required to have a fully enclosed cab for safety.

Witnesses reported that upon arrival at "Skunk Lake," Root was incoherent and nearly unconscious from smoke inhalation and heat exhaustion. He also was severely burned when the engine, its coal tender and other cars were damaged when passing through the inferno. Note that over 400 people were killed in the wildfire, an amount close to the number of souls originally aboard train No. 4 that day before Root took on several escapees and headed back north. Root's and his crew's heroic efforts that day perhaps reduced the death toll by as much as 50 percent; they are estimated to have saved between 200 to 300 people.

== Relationship to the Willard Munger State Trail ==
The Willard Munger State Trail was named to honor Munger, a West Duluth native who became Minnesota's longest-serving state representative. The memorial trail runs for about 65 miles along a section of the original St. Paul and Duluth Railroad right of way. Its northern end in West Duluth begins just south of Grand Avenue's intersection with 75th Avenue West and Pulaski Street near the Lake Superior Zoo in Norton Park along the St. Louis River. It runs through Jay Cooke State Park, named after Northern Pacific Railway financier Jay Cooke. Its southern terminus is in Hinckley, at the intersection of 2nd Street NW and Old Highway 61, about two blocks north of the Hinckley Fire Museum. The museum stands at the site of the rebuilt St. Paul and Duluth Railroad Depot, later called the Northern Pacific Railway Depot. The building is on the National Register of Historic Places.

== Disposition ==
The line was purchased by the Northern Pacific Railway in 1900 which was succeeded by the Burlington Northern in 1970 when the Chicago, Burlington and Quincy Railway, a.k.a. "Burlington" or the "Burlington Route" merged with the Great Northern Railway, the Northern Pacific Railway, and the Spokane, Portland, and Seattle Railway, and then on the final day of 1996, the Atchison, Topeka and Santa Fe Railway, a.k.a. the "Santa Fe" merged with the Burlington Northern Railway to form the Burlington Northern Santa Fe Railway. Known now as the BNSF Railway Company since January 24, 2005. Most of the St. Paul and Duluth line became redundant after the 1970 Burlington Northern merger, as it paralleled lines of the Great Northern Railway and Northern Pacific Railway. Most of the line originally associated with the St. Paul and Duluth Railroad was abandoned and many segments were turned into rail trails.

Its segments include:

- St. Paul to Maplewood: abandoned; now part of the Bruce Vento Regional Trail
- Maplewood to Hugo: now operated by the Minnesota Commercial Railway
- Hugo to North Branch: abandoned; now the Hardwood Creek Regional Trail and Sunrise Prairie Trail
- North Branch to Hinckley: now operated by the St. Croix Valley Railroad which continues to use the "Skally Line" moniker and a logo with a modification of the original Northern Pacific "monad," i.e. a white encircled, red and black "ying-yang." Today, the St Croix Valley Railroad interchanges with the BNSF Railway in Hinckley.
- Hinckley to Duluth: abandoned; now the Willard Munger State Trail.
