= Electric Short Line Railway =

Former railroad in Minnesota

Electric Short Line Railway Electric Short Line Terminal Co. Minnesota Western Railroad Minneapolis Industrial Railway
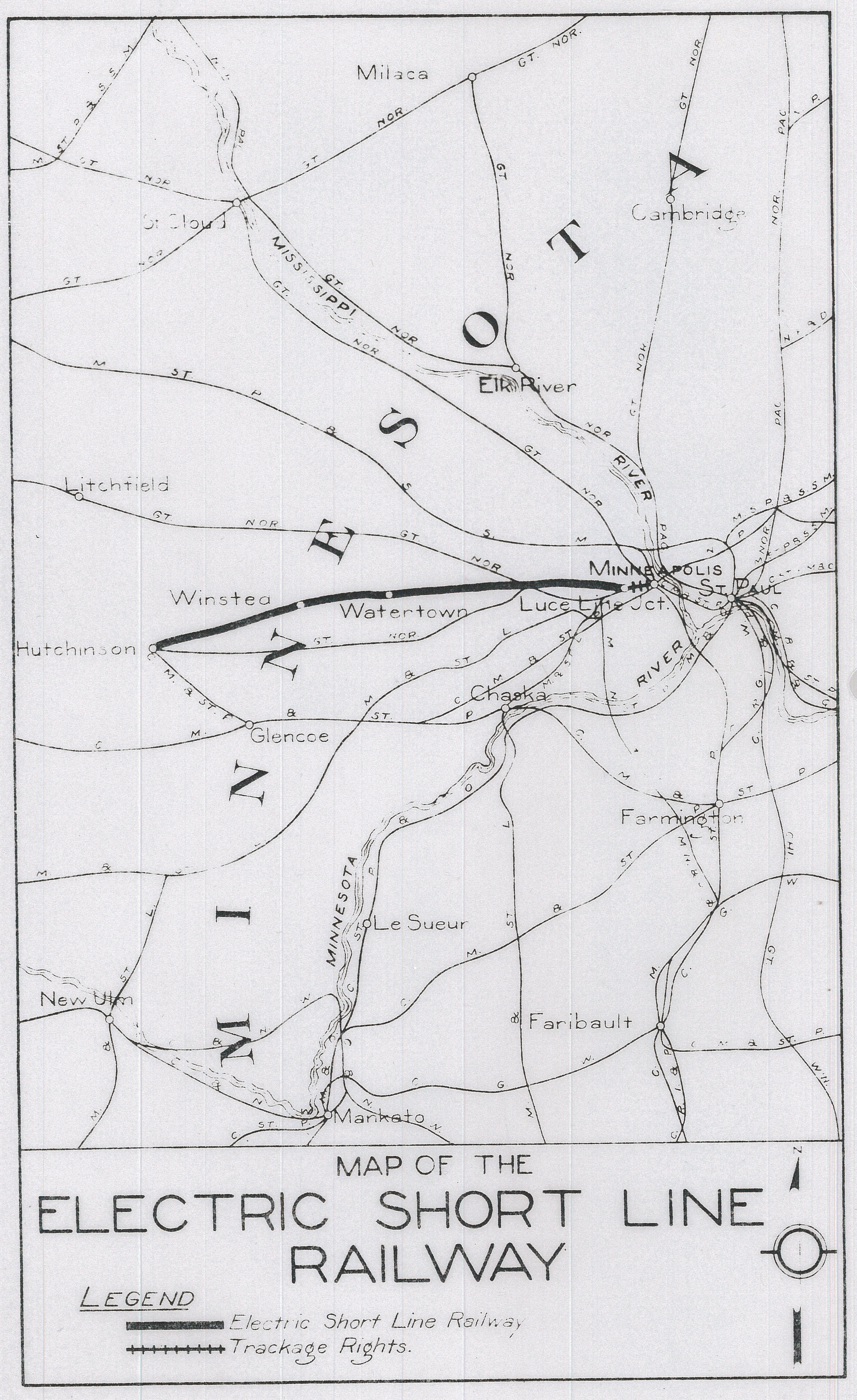
- ~1917 map of the railroad

Overview
- Headquarters: Minneapolis, Minnesota
- Locale: Minnesota
- Dates of operation: 1908–1924 (ESL Ry.); 1924–1956 (MWRR/MIR)

Technical
- Track gauge: 4 ft 8 1/2 in (1,435 mm) standard gauge

The Electric Short Line Railway, also known as Luce Electric Lines, was a railroad that operated in Minnesota, originating in Minneapolis and heading westward.

The railroad owes its nickname to the fact it was operated by members of the Luce family. The railroad ultimately reached beyond Clara City to Gluek. Today, the line has mostly been abandoned, but its former right-of-way now hosts the Luce Line State Trail operated by the Minnesota Department of Natural Resources. The Luce Line Regional Trail operated by the Three Rivers Park District connects to the state trail, but runs on roads and paths that roughly parallel what remains of the Luce Electric Lines.

== History ==
The Electric Short Line Railway and the affiliated Electric Short Line Railroad (later renamed the Electric Short Line Terminal Co.) were incorporated in late 1908. Construction started in 1909, but it took until 1913 for the first 3.2 miles (5.1 km) to be completed from 3rd Avenue and 7th Street North (construction was in various stages of completion for the next 30 miles, however). That spot was originally known as Boagen Green, then became Luce Line Junction when the Dan Patch Line reached it. It eventually became known as Glenwood Junction. Rail east of that point was owned by the ESL Terminal Co., while rail to the west was owned by the ESL Railway. 17.8 miles were complete by mid-1914, 47.5 by mid-1915, and 70.9 miles by the end of 1917 (although some of this included double-tracking), reaching Hutchinson.

Backers of the line had originally planned to reach Brookings, South Dakota, and construction westward resumed in 1922 with completion to Cosmos and extension to Lake Lillian the following year. However, the railroad fell into foreclosure in 1924, and the Electric Short Line Railway came under the control of the Minnesota Western Railroad, which had been formed by the ESL Railway's bondholders. The Luce family lost control of the company when it was purchased by Minneapolis, Northfield & Southern in 1927. MN&S predecessor Dan Patch Lines had a very early relationship with the Luce Line having built a connection to the Luce Line from Auto Club in Bloomington to Glenwood Junction in Golden Valley in 1915, and had used the track from Glenwood Junction to the terminal in Minneapolis for many years. After the Dan Patch ceased operations in 1916, the organization of the MN&S in 1918 helped secure the Luce Line's profitability as MN&S became a very important beltline allowing inbound shipments to Minneapolis to avoid the crowded railyards between St Paul and Minneapolis.

Despite the "Electric Short Line" name, the railroad never operated electric locomotives. Passenger service used gasoline-electric railcars manufactured by General Electric and Wason Car Company, though one gasoline-mechanical McKeen Motor Car Company railcar also saw use. The railcars often towed extra passenger cars as trailers. Freight trains were pulled by steam locomotives.

The Minnesota Western Railway continued to operate passenger service into the late 1940s, but it was reduced in 1939 to one daily (except Sunday) round trip over the line. Passenger service finally ended on September 10, 1947.

On December 28, 1955, the Electric Short Line Railway was purchased by the Minneapolis, Northfield, & Southern. The ESL was subsequently merged into the MN&S on September 4, 1956. The old ESL terminal in downtown Minneapolis and its line from downtown Minneapolis to Glenwood Junction was included in the deal. In turn, the Minnesota Western Railway was acquired by the Minneapolis and St. Louis Railway on January 31 1956. On September 8, 1959, M&St.L renamed the line the Minneapolis Industrial Railway. (Despite the new name, only Minnesota Western caboose #1216 received the MIR logo). M&StL came under control of the Chicago and North Western Railway on November 1, 1960. The MW subsequently saw deferred maintenance and reduced service as the C&NW sought to abandon the line. In 1967, C&NW asked the Minnesota Railroad and Warehouse Commission for permission to abandon the Gluek to Hutchinson segment. Protests against abandonment were logged, but C&NW tore up the line almost immediately after the MRWC approved abandonment. Two years later, the C&NW was back before the MRWC to ask permission to abandon the line from Hutchinson to Plymouth, Minnesota. The MRWC approved the abandonment and by the mid-1970s, 104 miles of the former Luce Line, including the section between Hutchinson and Plymouth, had been removed. Chicago and North Western was merged into the Union Pacific Railroad in 1995, and the remnants of the Luce Line between Interstate 494 and downtown Minneapolis are now operated as the UP's Golden Valley Industrial Lead.
