= Minnesota Prairie Line, Inc. =

Minnesota Prairie Line
Overview
- Headquarters: Glencoe, Minnesota
- Reporting mark: MPLI
- Locale: Minnesota
- Dates of operation: 2002–

Technical
- Track gauge: 4 ft 8 1/2 in (1,435 mm) standard gauge
- Length: 94 mi (151 km)

Other
- Website: http://www.tcwr.net/mpl/

Minnesota Prairie Line (reporting mark MPLI) is a short-line railroad in the U.S. state of Minnesota which started operations in October 2002. It is a subsidiary of the Twin Cities and Western Railroad (reporting mark TCWR), and runs on 94 miles (151 km) of track owned by the Minnesota Valley Regional Railroad Authority (MVRRA). It has been partially funded through federal and state government sources. The tracks were originally built by the Minneapolis and St. Louis Railway around 1880 between Norwood and Morton, and 1884 west of there. From Morton west, the line was built by the Wisconsin, Minnesota & Pacific Railway, and this stretch of track was subsequently purchased by M&STL in the late 1880s. The line connects on its eastern end to parent TC&W at Norwood, and extends westward to Hanley Falls, Minnesota.

The Minneapolis and St. Louis Railway was acquired by Chicago and North Western (reporting mark CNW) in 1960. The line remained profitable, with the C&NW taking heavy tonnage off the route, but maintenance of the tracks slowed and then ceased. In 1983 the North Western was granted permission to abandon the line. The Minnesota Valley Regional Rail Authority purchased the line in 1984. Subsequently, a new operator, the MNVA Railroad, commenced operations on the line in March 1984. In December 1994, MNVA ceased operations and sold its assets to the Minnesota Central Railroad (MCTA). MCTA experienced little to no success, and ceased operations in 1999. The Nobles Rock Railroad then operated the line until 2000, when operations ceased and the line subsequently languished for two years.

Twin Cities and Western employees took an exploratory journey along the track in April 2002 to determine its condition. The track was rehabilitated over the summer, but could still only support speeds of 5 to 10 mph (8.0 to 16.1 km/h) by the time the first revenue train ran in October. MPLI initially used two former TC&W EMD GP10s, which had the MPLI logo applied to them on the long hood side. Currently, MPLI utilizes Red River Valley and Western Caterpillar Generation II locomotives (GP20Cs and GP15Cs). Trains typically run five days per week between Norwood and Wood Lake, Minnesota, with service as needed to Hanley Falls. Track condition remained poor as of 2009, still only supporting speeds of 10 mph or less, but the railroad had success in securing state and federal funding that year. The tracks have been rehabilitated with new rail and ties, and train speed are up to 25 mph between Norwood Young-America and Winthrop. At Winthrop, there is an ethanol plant that is a large shipper for the railroad. Over the remainder of the line train speeds are only 10 mph.

The line meets BNSF tracks in Hanley Falls. BNSF now owns the ex-M&StL track west of the city, as well as the ex-Great Northern track running northeast / southwest through town.

The communities of Fairfax and Belview still have old Minneapolis and St. Louis train stations preserved in their towns, turned into museums. The Fairfax building is still in its original location right next to the tracks, while the one in Belview has been moved a short distance from the line.
