= Minneapolis and St. Louis Railway =

American railroad from 1870 to 1960

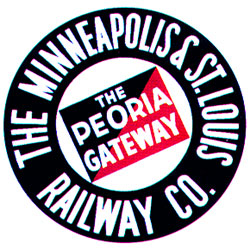

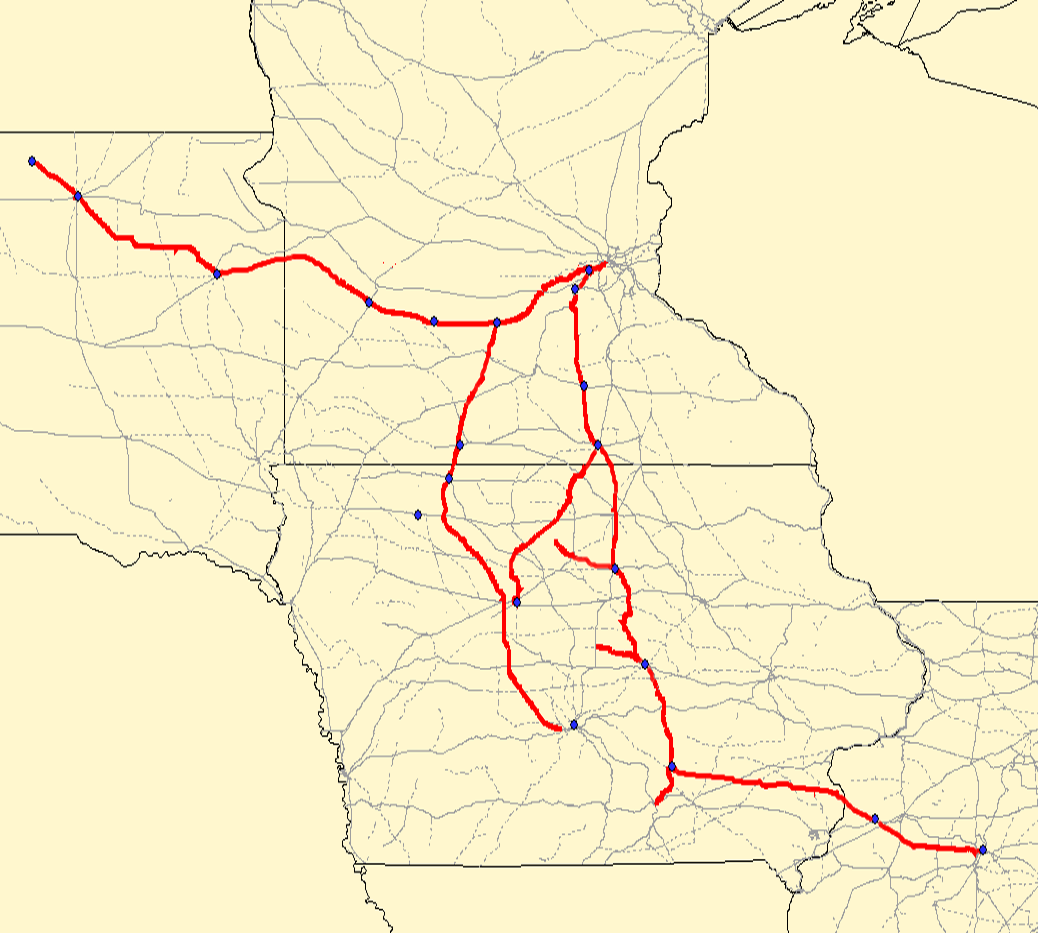

Overview
- Headquarters: Minneapolis, Minnesota
- Reporting mark: MSTL
- Locale: Illinois, Iowa, Minnesota, and South Dakota
- Dates of operation: 1870–1960
- Successor: Chicago and North Western

Technical
- Track gauge: 4 ft 8 1/2 in (1,435 mm) standard gauge

The Minneapolis and St. Louis Railway (M&StL) (reporting mark MSTL) was an American Class I railroad that built and operated lines radiating south and west from Minneapolis, Minnesota for 90 years from 1870 to 1960. The railway never reached St. Louis (despite its name) but its North Star Limited passenger train ran to that city via the Wabash Railroad.

The railway's most important route was between Minneapolis and Peoria, Illinois; a second major route extended from Minneapolis into eastern South Dakota, and other trackage served areas in north-central Iowa and south-central Minnesota. The M&StL was founded in 1870, and expanded through line construction and acquisition until the early 20th century. Most of the railway's routes saw only relatively light traffic, and consequently the company's financial position was frequently precarious; the railroad operated under bankruptcy protection between 1923 and 1943. The M&StL was acquired by the Chicago and North Western Railway in 1960, and much of its former trackage was abandoned.

In 1956 it reported 1550 million net ton-miles of revenue freight and 2 million passenger-miles on 1397 route-miles and 1748 track-miles operated; those totals do not include the 117-mile Minnesota Western.

== History ==
=== Beginning ===
The Minneapolis & St. Louis Railway was created on May 26, 1870 by a group of Minnesota investors interested in establishing a railroad connection between Minneapolis and the agricultural regions to the south. Minneapolis was home to the largest flour milling operations in the country at that time. Wheat was the primary commodity grown in southern Minnesota and Northern Iowa. Not wanting to be captive shippers for railroad companies from Milwaukee and Chicago, the Washburns, Crosbys and Pillsburys – the men who owned the flour mills in Minneapolis – formed their own railroad as a way to ship wheat in and ship flour out. By 1880, the road had reached Albert Lea to the south and leased the St. Paul and Duluth Railroad to ship flour to Duluth, Minnesota for transport to markets served by Great Lakes shipping and to ship lumber south from northern Minnesota and northern Wisconsin using the St Paul and Taylor's Falls road as a means to capture a large portion of the lumber market. As the wheat growing regions moved north and west, the company acquired and built lines to South Dakota.

=== 19th century ===
Ultimately the railroad's primary line was extended south from the Twin Cities into Iowa and then east to Peoria. It ran through Mason City, Iowa, which became an important traffic center for the railroad. One of the major attractions of the railroad was that it allowed freight bound for Illinois to bypass Chicago.

The Minneapolis and St. Louis Railway had spurs into various parts of Iowa and a line into South Dakota. During the 1880s the M&StL went into its first receivership leaving the Rock Island interests in control of the M&StL. The Rock Island turned over the operation of the western district of the Wisconsin, Minnesota & Pacific (another Rock Island road) to the M&StL by 1889 which ran from Morton, Minnesota to Watertown, South Dakota (the eastern district of the WM&P ran from Mankato, to Red Wing, Minnesota and later became part of the Chicago Great Western—the two districts of the WM&P were never connected). After receivership ended in the mid-1890s the M&StL purchased the western district of the WM&P in 1899 from the Rock Island and built an extension from Morton, Minnesota eastward toward Minneapolis connecting the western mainline with its southern mainline at Hopkins, thereby connecting the two mainlines and creating a continuous railroad system. In the 1890s the road built its Southwestern branch from Winthrop, through New Ulm, St James, and Sherburn in Minnesota, continuing to Estherville, Terril, Spencer and reaching Storm Lake in Iowa. A mile-long bridge was built over the valley of the Little Sioux River at Sioux Rapids, Iowa.

Its sister railroad, the Iowa Central Railway began in Iowa in 1866 and merged with Minneapolis and St. Louis Railway in 1901. Even as far back as 1870, the company looked immediately to the Iowa Central as a natural ally to capture the Iowa wheat market and to feed the hungry mills along the banks of St Anthony Falls in Minneapolis. By 1916 the combined system had become stable and was absorbing other, smaller railroads.

=== 20th century ===
The railroads sold land to prospective farmers at very low rates, expecting to make their profits by shipping farm products out and home goods in. They also set up small towns that would serve as shipping points and commercial centers, and attract businessmen and more farmers. The M&StL in 1905, under the innovative leadership of its vice president and general manager L. F. Day, added lines from Watertown to Le Beau and from Conde through Aberdeen to Leola. It developed town sites along the new lines and by 1910, the new lines served 35 small communities.

Not all the new towns survived. The M&StL situated LeBeau along the Missouri River on the eastern edge of the Cheyenne River Indian Reservation. The new town a hub for the cattle and grain industries. Livestock valued at one million dollars were shipped out in 1908, and the rail company planned a bridge across the Missouri River. Allotment of land on the Cheyenne River Indian Reservation in 1909 promised further growth, but the Chicago, Milwaukee, St. Paul and Pacific Railroad (the "Milwaukee Road") had beaten M&StL to the punch crossing the Missouri River and becoming the last transcontinental line in 1909 when Seattle was reached ending M&StL's push to cross the Missouri River. LeBeau would be the western terminus of the road. By the early 1920s, however, troubles multiplied, with the murder of a local rancher, a fire that destroyed the business district, and drought that ruined ranchers and farmers alike. LeBeau became a ghost town.

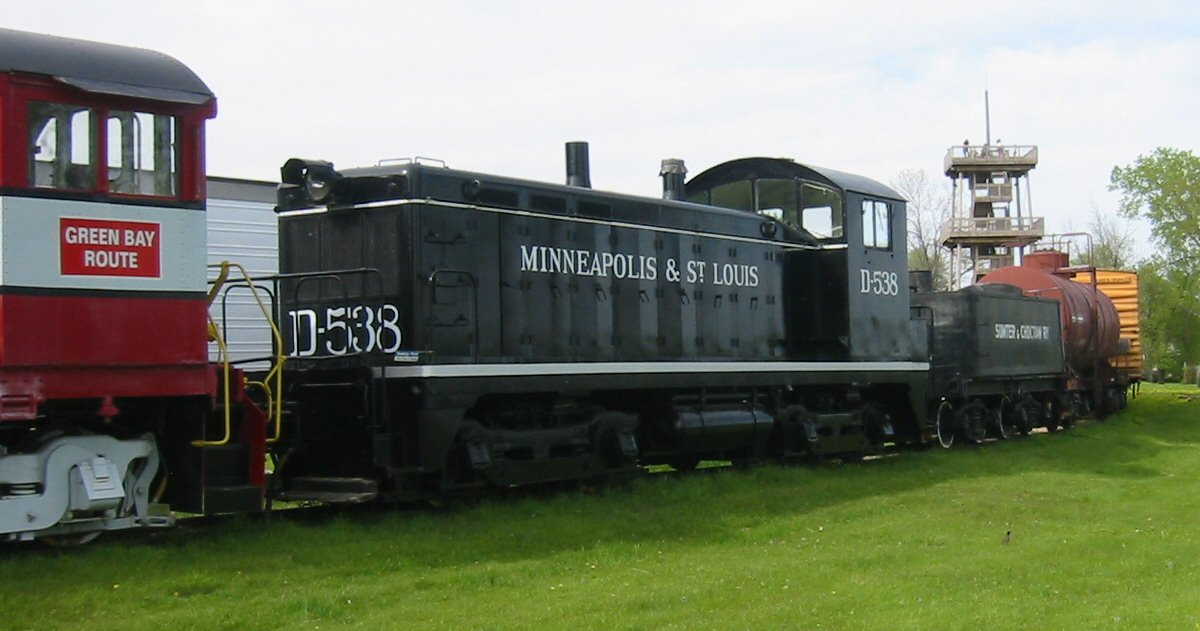
Locomotive D-538 is preserved at the National Railroad Museum in Green Bay, Wisconsin.

The railroad was also having financial problems as the 1920s dawned. The USRA takeover of the US railroad system during World War I turned out to be disastrous for the M&StL. The USRA mis-managed many roads and the M&StL was among those to suffer the worst of USRA mismanagement. By 1923, financial difficulties brought on by USRA mismanagement led the road to again enter receivership by mid-year. William Bremner was appointed receiver and the road struggled mightily throughout the remainder of the 1920s. The court overseeing the receivership would not allow expenditures that would have contributed to improved physical plant and greater efficiency, such as new locomotives, modern rolling stock and heavier rail. Bremner soldiered on overseeing the operations of the road, but there were almost no efforts made at reorganizing the road, as what little cash was available was used to pay bankruptcy creditors. In 1927, the Great Northern Railway (GN) and the Northern Pacific Railway (NP) announced their intentions to merge and would include M&StL in the new "Great Northern Pacific Railway." On an inspection tour of the road with Bremner as part of goodwill in the merger proceedings, GN's Ralph Budd found the M&StL to be in deplorable condition and wrote to a colleague that he was even more convinced that M&StL could never make it as a stand-alone carrier. Still, the case was brought before the Interstate Commerce Commission (ICC) which approved the merger, except that GN and NP would have to divest themselves of the Chicago, Burlington and Quincy Railroad (CB&Q). Not wanting to part with its very lucrative link to Chicago, GN and NP dropped the merger case and M&StL remained independent while remaining in serious financial trouble, with the Great Depression just around the corner. During the first part of the 1930s, several suggestions were made to sell off M&StL piecemeal to whoever wanted its disparate pieces. The Illinois Central, CB&Q, Soo Line, GN, Wabash Railroad and the Chicago and North Western Railway (C&NW) comprised a syndicate called Associated Railways that was to determine how the M&StL should be broken up. Competing forces with company employees and its receivers on one hand and Associated on the other brought further complexity to M&StL's already precarious position each lobbying their positions before the ICC on the matter. Despite the fight for the railroad to be sold to a larger operation, broken up piecemeal, or shut down entirely, Lucian Sprague took over as receiver in 1935 after Bremner unexpectedly died in November 1934. Sprague streamlined the company and its assets by selling off scrap, increasing efficiency and ordering significant abandonments, mostly in Iowa. The most notable abandonment was the portion of the Southwestern between Storm Lake, Iowa and Spencer, Iowa which was abandoned in 1936 and the huge bridge that spanned the Little Sioux River valley was dismantled. The Milwaukee Road offered to take over operations along the Storm Lake, Truesdale, Rembrandt remnants of the Southwestern north of Storm Lake thereby allowing abandonment to proceed. Other abandonments were granted in the late 1930s in Iowa and South Dakota, trimming 17 percent of railroad in Iowa alone. With these cost saving measures, Sprague began efforts at reorganizing the property in 1940. By 1942 Sprague was elevated to chairman/president and orchestrated a reorganization that year. The effort was a success and in 1943 the receivership was terminated and ownership was returned to the railroad.

Despite the curious route structure of the road, it prospered as a bridge line between western and eastern markets in the year following World War II. As a result of prosperous years following the war, Sprague's successful management of the road allowed it to be exposed to corporate raiders, such as Benjamin W. Heineman who in late 1953 began orchestrating a takeover of the company and lobbing charges of malfeasance against the Sprague administration. The battle for the road continued through the remainder of 1953 and in to 1954 with both Sprague and Heineman taking to the press to malign the other. Sprague was ousted in a dramatic shareholders battle orchestrated by Heineman in May 1954.

=== Heineman at the helm ===
Heineman had no intention of operating the M&StL. He was not a railroad man. He was simply a corporate raider with a great deal of capital at his disposal from his business partnerships. With M&StL, his allegiance was not to the road's customers, or employees, or service territory, but only to shareholder value which is why he ultimately ended up winning the shareholders battle against Sprague. Few M&StL shareholders had a direct connection to the company. Most shareholders were people from the east and Heineman played masterfully to their investment that a new management team would increase their value in the company. Further, Heineman believed a great deal of money could be made through merger rather than on operating a railroad.

=== Toledo, Peoria & Western ===
Not long after his arrival, however, Heineman saw great potential in the M&StL as a stand-alone company seeing the road had modern rolling stock, no bonded debts, was making money and had paid over $6M in dividends since receivership had ended back in 1943. The road tried valiantly to acquire the Toledo, Peoria & Western in 1954 and 1955. TP&W would extend M&StL eastward connecting with the Pennsylvania Railroad (PRR) and Nickel Plate Road in the east, and the Santa Fe Railroad in the west. However, Heineman's heavy handed tactics in acquiring the M&StL did little to endear himself to the shareholders of the TP&W. The PRR and the Santa Fe quickly entered the fray attempting to prevent M&StL from acquiring the TP&W seeing as Heineman's group was also acquiring stock in the Monon Railroad. The presidents of both the PRR and the Santa Fe held warm relations with Lucian Sprague, but held disdain for Heineman and eventually the PRR and Santa Fe were able to jointly acquire the TP&W at the price of $140 per share, much to the ire of Heineman who felt betrayed by TP&W shareholders after having bid up the price thinking his bids would win out. The plan backfired and Heineman eventually left for C&NW in 1956 after his group had gained controlling interest in that road.

=== Minnesota Western ===
Not long after Heineman's departure the M&StL acquired the Minnesota Western Railroad, which was the successor line to the famous Luce Line Railroad in central Minnesota. In a move that baffles many to this day in railroad circles, the M&StL purchase of the MW was intended to show increased focus on industrial development for the M&StL. The move had only marginal effects on traffic along the MW and contributed only insignificant profits to the M&StL. In early 1960, the MW was renamed Minneapolis Industrial Railway furthering the campaign of industrialization the road was trying to capture. Only one piece of rolling stock was painted in the MIR livery – a former MW caboose.

=== Merger with C&NW ===
By 1960, things were business as usual for M&StL. At the January 1960 board meeting, members received traffic and financial forecasts for 1960. The company was in good financial condition even as competition for freight from trucks, barges and other roads was eating away at M&StL's traffic base. In April, however, a company meeting was called at the M&StL office building in Minneapolis where Chairman Max Swiren and President Albert Schroeder got right to the point – the M&StL would become part of C&NW (returning control to Ben Heineman), pending approval by regulators and the boards of both companies. On November 1, 1960, the C&NW acquired the properties of the M&StL.

It is unlikely that the M&StL would have survived the 1960s as a stand-alone company. The merger of the Hill Lines in 1970 would have eventually done in the company as M&StL enjoyed significant bridge traffic from both GN and NP. The BN merger would have meant a massive loss of bridge traffic as BN would have done what it could to keep that traffic on its own rails. M&StL was losing less-than-carload (LCL) traffic to the trucking and barge industries which eroded traffic further. The other Granger mergers as well as bankruptcies would have crippled M&StL's remaining bridge connections. Losing out on the TP&W property in the mid-1950s was a significant setback for the company. Things might have turned out different for the M&StL had it been able to acquire the TP&W. Perhaps the company would have eventually merged with a partner other than C&NW. In the end, Chairmen Swiren and President Schroeder recognized that the losses the M&StL had already suffered – and other losses it was sure to suffer in the future – was a clear indication that merger was really the only option left for the company. So, the company was sold when its value was as high as the Directorate thought they could get for their company.

=== Later years along the M&StL ===
By 1963, long-haul traffic had been transferred to former C&NW routes. Large sections of the former M&StL were abandoned in the 1960s and 1970s. The MW was ripped up in two stages between 1968 and 1970. In the end, Ralph Budd had been right about the M&StL in 1927 predicting the company would never survive. The company survived another 33 years to 1960, but the M&StL was one of the earliest victims of the mass mergers in the railroad industry of the 1950s and 1960s ending M&StL's career as a stand-alone carrier and resulting in the eventual abandonment of nearly the entire property.

== The M&StL today ==
Today only a few short segments of the old M&StL remain in use. In Minnesota, The Minnesota Valley Regional Railroad Authority owns the former M&StL line from Norwood Young America to Hanley Falls and has been operated by Twin Cities & Western affiliate Minnesota Prairie Line. The line from Hanley Falls to Madison is owned by the BNSF Railroad. The Montgomery Spur, which runs from Merriam Junction just south of Shakopee to Montgomery, is operated by the Union Pacific. The Minneapolis Industrial Railway west of I494 was completely abandoned by 1970. Between downtown Minneapolis and Golden Valley, the far eastern portion of the MIR survives today as UP's Golden Valley Industrial Lead. The Chaska Industrial Lead from Merriam Junction to downtown Chaska was abandoned by UP following a trestle collapse along the Minnesota River in the spring of 2007 due to high water. UP later sold the Chaska Industrial Lead corridor to a coalition of area government entities to preserve it for future transportation use, sewer lines, and recreational trails. In Iowa, UP operates the line from Mallard to Grand Junction, from Northwood through Mason City to Rockwell, and Marshalltown to Eddyville. The now-abandoned route owned by Iowa Pacific Railroad from Steamboat Rock to Marshalltown, Iowa, was scrapped and removed in 2015. Canadian National (owner of the former Illinois Central) operated a short spur from Ackley, Iowa northwards to Geneva, Iowa into the early 2000s. While the CN connection to the former M&StL mainline in Ackley still exists to interchange with the Iowa River Railroad, the at-grade railroad crossing over the CN has been removed, cutting off access to the line northward to Geneva. Most of the M&StL Mississippi River bridge still stands between Keithsburg, Illinois and Oakville, Iowa.

== Passenger service ==
While the primary business of the M&StL was the haulage of freight, the railroad also operated a limited number of passenger train services. Since the railroad's route structure was not based on direct lines between major American cities, long-distance passenger service was generally not competitive with the trains of larger railroads. The premiere M&StL passenger train was the North Star Limited, which operated from Minneapolis to Albia, Iowa on the M&StL, and then continued to St. Louis via the Wabash Railroad (and a second Wabash option to Kansas City). The North Star Limited was discontinued in 1935.

Nonetheless, in 1951 the M&StL still had several extant passenger routes in operation, the longer routes being: the above mentioned Twin Cities to Albia route; an Oskaloosa, Iowa east to Peoria, Illinois mixed train route with a long layover in Monmouth, Illinois; a Twin Cities west to Watertown, South Dakota route and a Twin Cities route south to Des Moines, Iowa.

In 1929, the M&StL began acquiring a number of gas-electric railcars—self-propelled vehicles that included compartments for baggage/express and mail. Some of the gas-electrics also included passenger compartments, and all were able to tow additional passenger and express cars as necessary. Soon, the railcars provided nearly all of the railroad's meager passenger service. The railroad also purchased two Budd RDC's in 1957 for Minneapolis – Des Moines service, but the cars proved unsuccessful and they were sold the following year.

M&StL passenger service declined throughout the 1950s, the result of significant drops in mail, express, and passenger revenue. The last M&StL passenger services—trains 13 and 14 between Minneapolis and Watertown, South Dakota—made their final departures on July 20, 1960.

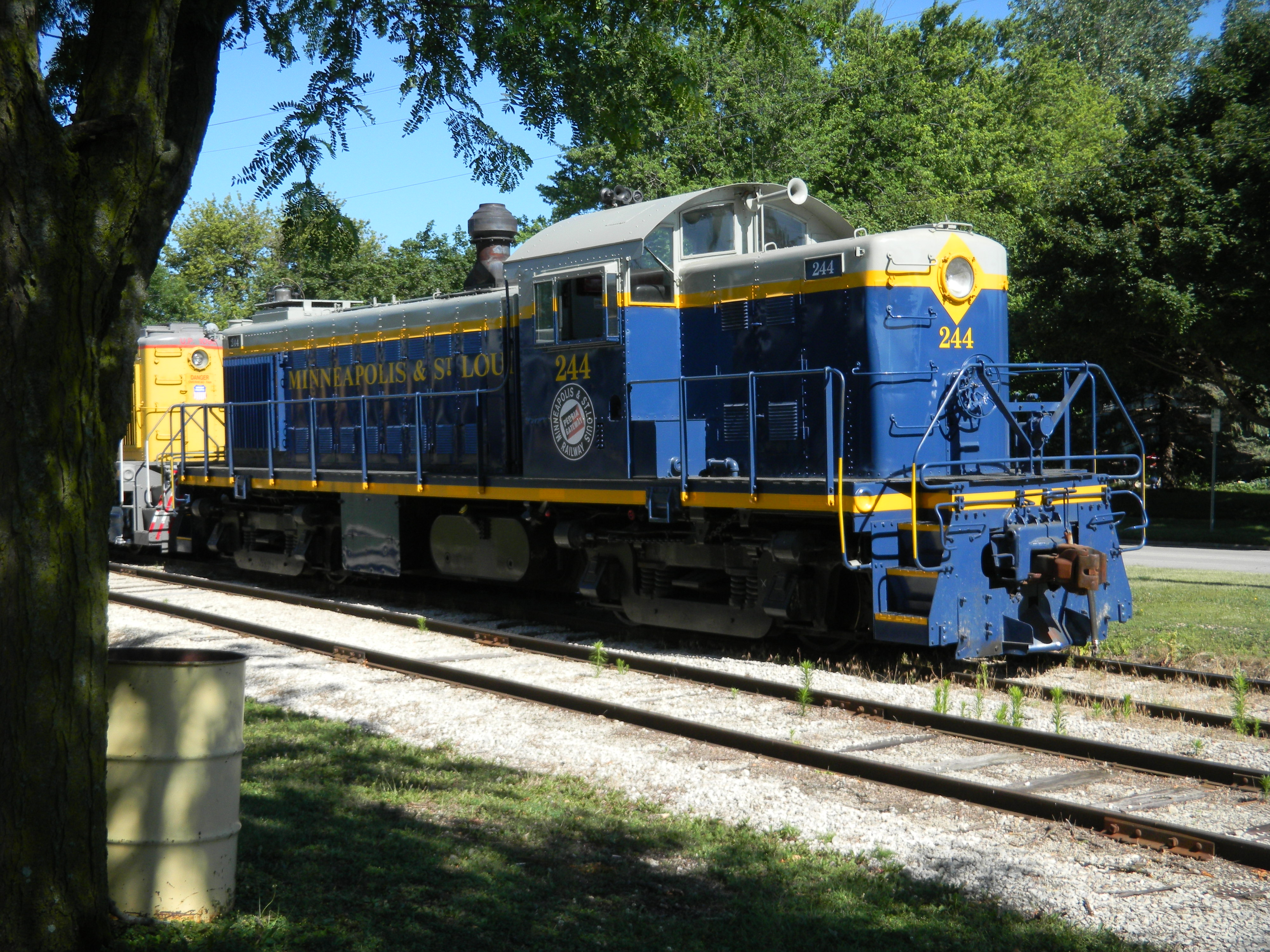
Recreation of Minneapolis and Saint Louis 244 at Boone and Scenic Valley Railroad

== Company Presidents ==
- Henry T. Welles: 1870–1872
- William D. Washburn: 1872–1882
- Ransom R. Cable: 1882–1888
- William Haynes Truesdale: 1888–1894
- William L. Bull: 1894–1897
- Edwin Hawley: 1897–1912
- Newman Erb: 1912–1916
- Edward L. Brown: 1916–1917
- William H. Bremner: 1917–1934
- Lucian Sprague: 1935–1954
- John W. Devins: 1954–1956
- Albert Schroeder: 1956–1960

== Surviving Equipment ==
| Locomotive | Type | Built | Status | Image |
|---|---|---|---|---|
| 234 | ALCO RS1 | 1951 | Built as #951, Alco 79347, 9/1951. Owned by West Coast Railway Association, Squamish, BC. Painted as Great Northern #182. | |
| 457 | 2-8-0 "Consolidation" | 1912 | On display in Mason City, IA. | |
| 471 | 2-8-0 "Consolidation" | 1910 | On display in Janesville, MN. Built as Iowa Central #429, 12/1910. | |
| D-149 | GE 44-T | 1948 | Owned by Branford Steam Railroad as, 7354. Rebuilt by GE in 1956 to a 80 Tonner. | |
| D-538 | EMD NW1 | 1938 | Owned by National Railroad Museum, Green Bay, WI. | |
| D-742 | GE 44-T | 1942 | Owned by Southern Michigan Railroad Society, Clinton, MI. Painted as D&M #10. | |
| D-842 | GE 44-T | 1942 | Current whereabouts unknown. | |
| 603 | EMD GP9R | 1956 | Owned by Boone & Scenic Valley Railroad, #751. Originally a EMD GP7 or a EMD FT or F2. Rebuilt by EMD and delivered in 1956. It was rebuilt in Oelwein, Iowa, in 1972, by the CNW. | |
| 702 | EMD GP9 | 1958 | Owned by National Railway Equipment, #1603. Leased to Heart of Georgia Railroad. | |
| 707 | EMD GP9 | 1958 | Owned by Eastern Illinois Railroad Company, #1040. | |
| 710 | EMD GP9 | 1958 | Owned by Napa Valley Wine Train, #69. | |
| 852 | EMD SD7 | 1952 | Owned by Agtegra Cooperative, Mellette, SD, #MEL-2. | |
