= Minnesota Commercial Railway =

Transport company in United States of America

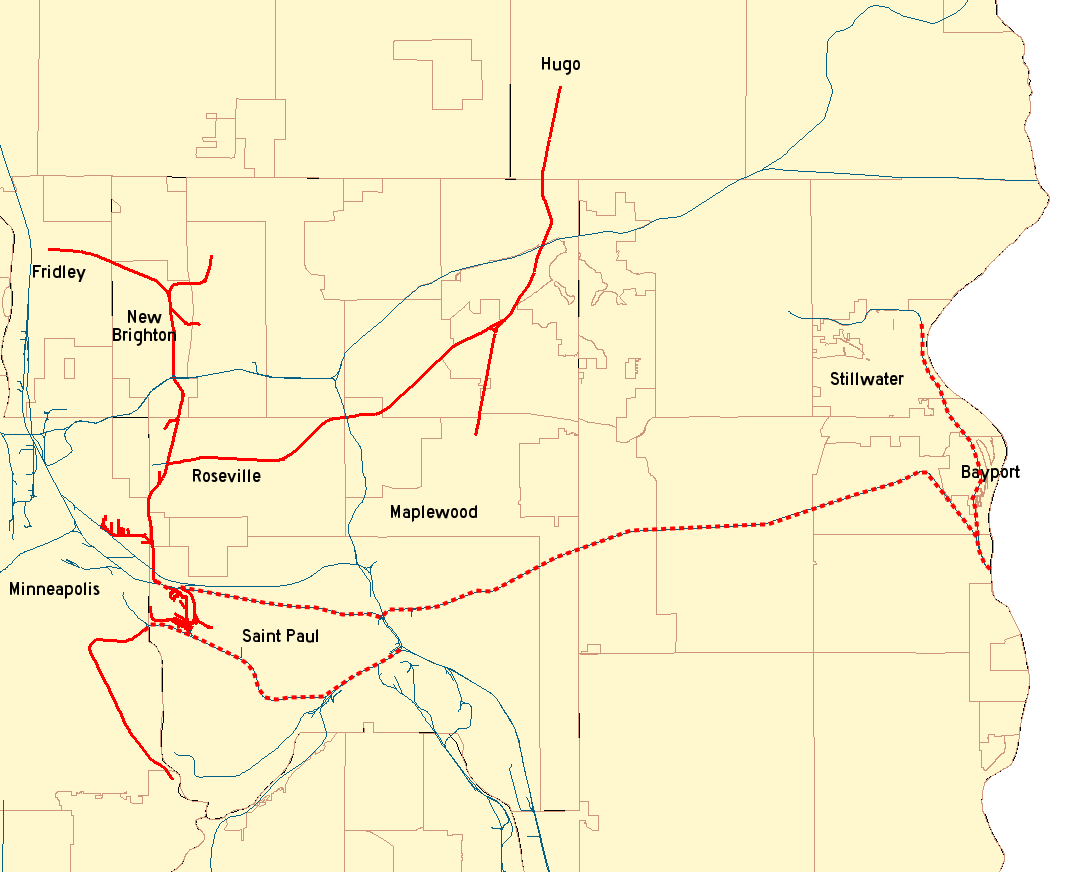
- Minnesota Commercial map around the Twin Cities. Solid lines are MNNR-owned; dotted lines indicate trackage rights. Blue lines are other railroads.

Overview
- Headquarters: St Paul
- Reporting mark: MNNR
- Locale: St Paul, Minneapolis, Minnesota
- Dates of operation: 1987–Present

Technical
- Track gauge: 4 ft 8 1/2 in (1,435 mm) standard gauge

The Minnesota Commercial Railway (reporting mark MNNR) is a short line railroad in the United States.

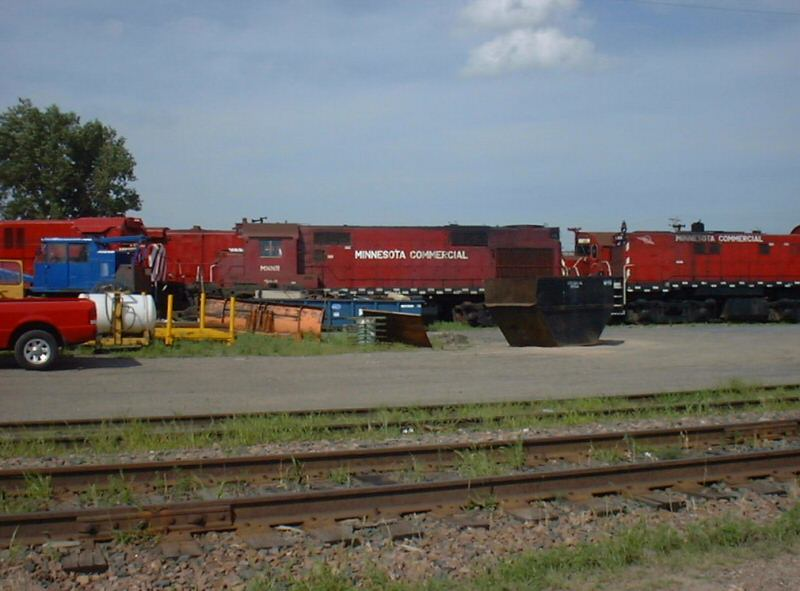
Several ALCo locomotives of the Minnesota Commercial Railway lined up outside their roundhouse in St. Paul.

This railroad operates out of the St. Paul area with service to Minneapolis, Hugo, Fridley and New Brighton. It is considered a switching and terminal railroad. It is based out of a roundhouse on Cleveland Ave. in St. Paul just blocks south of the former Amtrak station and its main yard is just to the north of the station.

Its lines consist of one to Fridley, with an interchange with Canadian National Railway (reporting mark CN) and a small yard in New Brighton. The railroad also runs to Hugo. It serves grain elevators on Minnesota State Highway 55 adjacent to the METRO Blue Line.

The Minnesota Commercial connects with all major railroads in the Twin Cities including: Canadian National Railway (reporting mark CN), BNSF Railway (reporting mark BNSF), Canadian Pacific Railway (reporting mark CP)(Now CPKC Railway)(reporting mark CPKC), Union Pacific Railroad (reporting mark UP), and Twin Cities and Western Railroad (reporting mark TCWR).

The MNNR's roster consists of mainly ALCo and GE locomotives. With over a dozen locomotives, the roster is diverse and meets the switching needs. Most units wear a red paint scheme much like that of the Green Bay and Western Railroad. By late August of 2023, MNNR had put most of its last active ALCos in storage, with a return to service unlikely.

The line was formerly known as the Minnesota Transfer Railroad (reporting mark MTFR). It was privately owned by the major railroads serving the Twin Cities area. The Minnesota Transfer was leased by the Minnesota Commercial on February 1, 1987. At the time Minnesota Commercial leased Minnesota Transfer, the railroad was down to 6,000 revenue units a year. By 2008, the Minnesota Commercial was handling over 46,000 revenue units.

In May 2025, it would be announced that the Minnesota Commercial would be acquired by Regional Rail, LLC, a shortline holding company. The transaction has occurred on June 1, although the railroad's current operations have not been affected.
