= Minnesota, Dakota and Western Railway =

4-mile shortline railroad

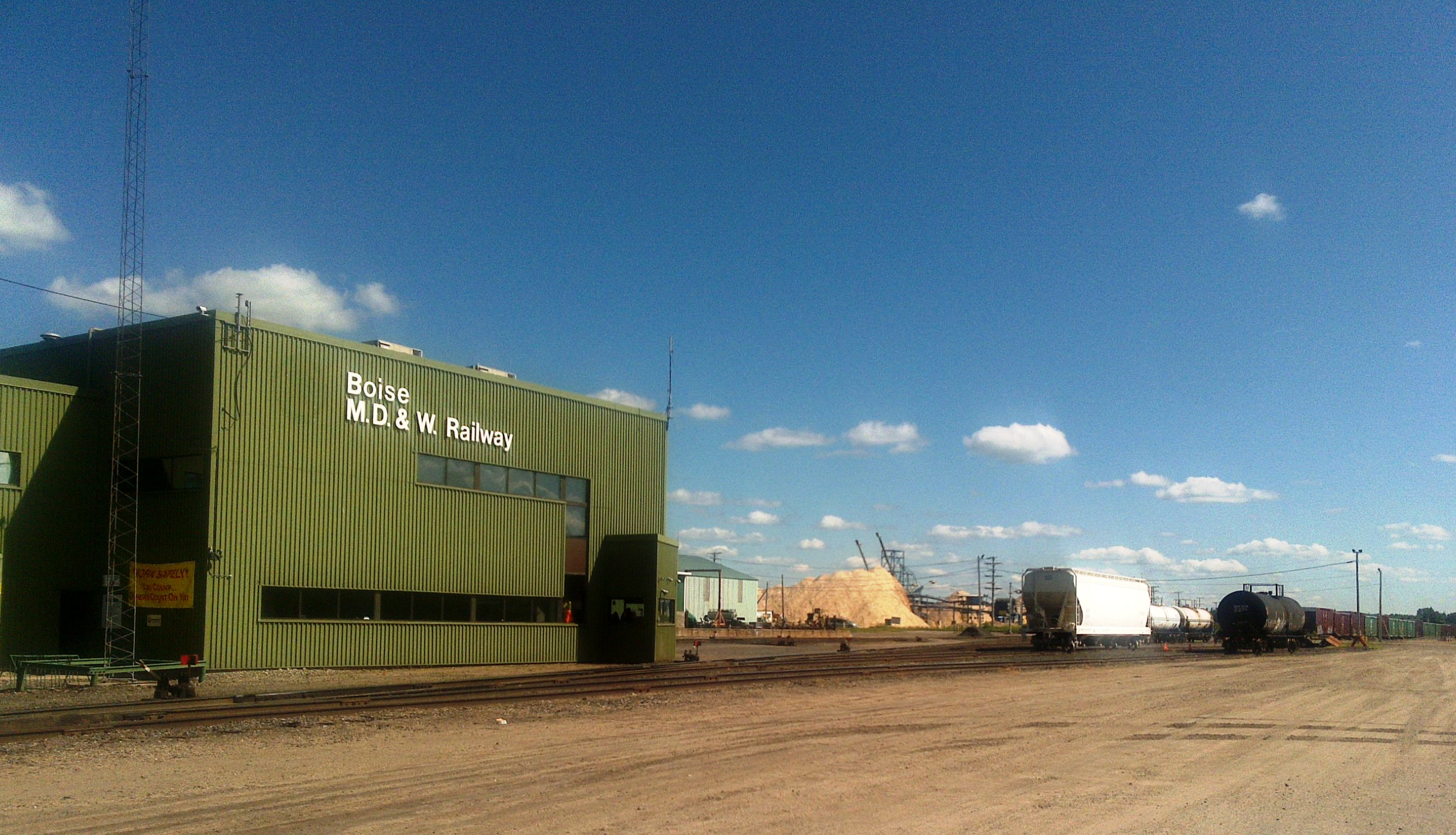
- Freight station at International Falls in 2009

Overview
- Dates of operation: 1910–
- Predecessor: International Bridge and Terminal Company

Technical
- Track gauge: 4 ft 8 1/2 in (1,435 mm) standard gauge

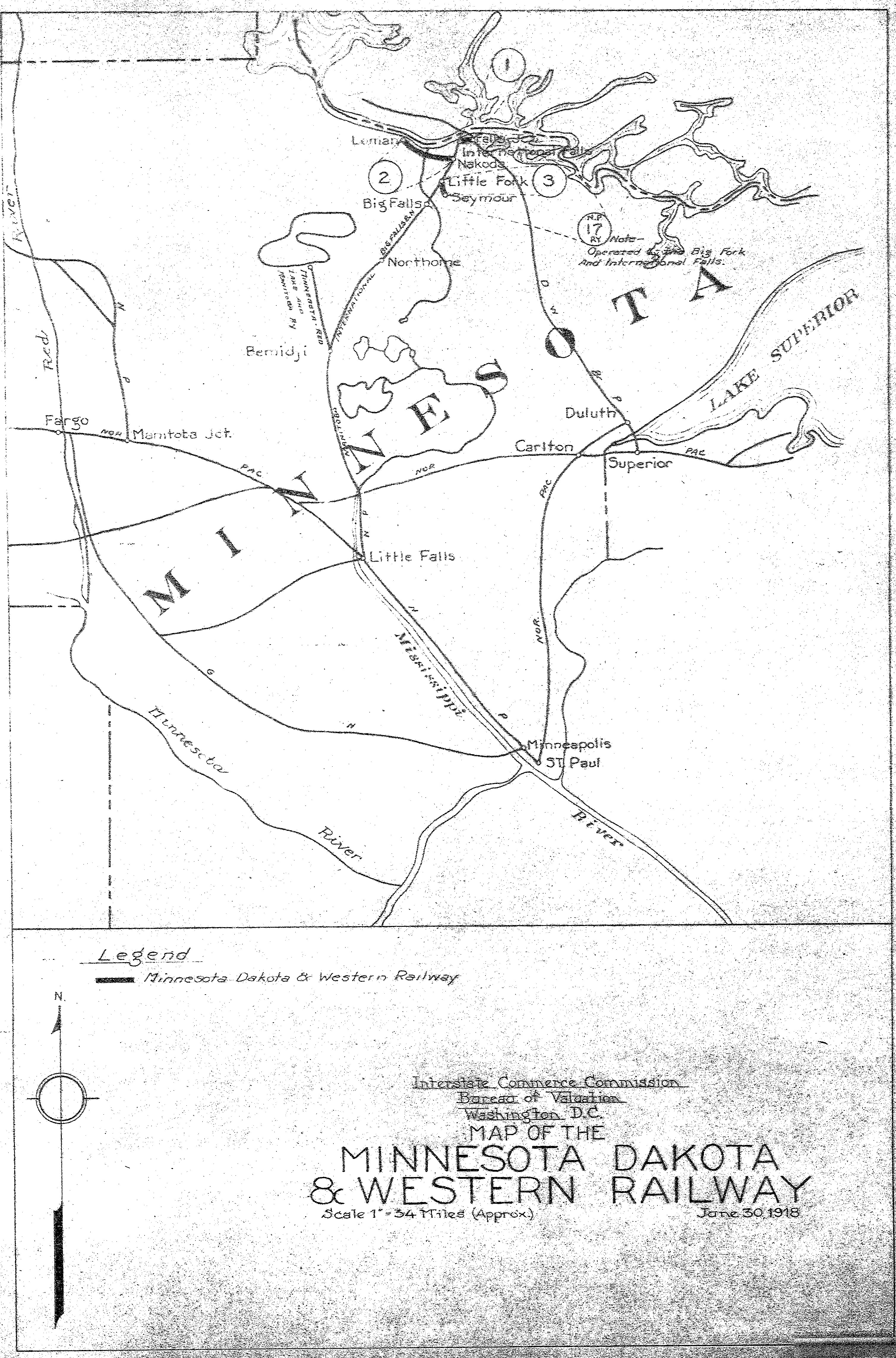
1919 map of the railroad

Minnesota Dakota and Western Railway (reporting mark MDW) is a shortline railroad operating 4 miles of track between International Falls and Ranier, Minnesota as well as between International Falls and Fort Frances, Ontario via the Fort Frances – International Falls International Bridge, which is jointly owned by MDW and Abitibi Consolidated. The railroad served the paper mills in both International Falls and Fort Frances until the Fort Frances mill closed in 2014. The railroad interchanges with Canadian National at Ranier.

In 2005 the railroad handled 11,841 carloads of wood pulp, pulpwood, chemicals, raw materials and finished paper. The railroad has a fleet of more than 3100 railcars.

Originally a subsidiary of Boise Cascade designed to serve its paper mills, the MDW was created in 1910; the company had been incorporated in 1902 as the International Bridge and Terminal Company (reporting mark IBT). The Canadian company, however, retains that name.

In August 2006, Boise Cascade announced that MDW would be sold to Watco, a company specializing in shortlines; however, the sale was never closed.

In February 2008, Boise Cascade spun off its paper, packaging, newsprint and transportation operations, including MDW, to a new company, Boise Inc.
