= List of Alabama railroads =

The following railroads have operated in the State of Alabama.

== Class I Railroads ==
- BNSF Railway (BNSF)
- Canadian National Railway (CN) through its subsidiary Illinois Central Railroad (IC)
- CSX Transportation (CSXT)
- Norfolk Southern Railway (NS) including its subsidiaries Alabama Great Southern Railroad (AGS) and Central of Georgia Railroad (CG)

== Regional Railroads ==
- Alabama and Gulf Coast Railway (AGR)

== Shortline and Terminal Railroads ==
- Alabama and Tennessee River Railway (ATN)
- Alabama Southern Railroad (ABS)
- Alabama Warrior Railway (ABWR)
- Autauga Northern Railroad (AUT)
- Bay Line Railroad (BAYL)
- Birmingham Terminal Railway (BHRR)
- CG Railway (CGR)
- Columbus and Chattahoochee Railroad (CCH)
- Conecuh Valley Railroad (COEH)
- Eastern Alabama Railway (EARY)
- Georgia Southwestern Railroad (GSWR)
- Huntsville and Madison County Railroad Authority (HMCR)
- Luxapalila Valley Railroad (LXVR)
- Meridian and Bigbee Railroad (MNBR)
- Mississippi Central Railroad (MSCI)
- Sequatchie Valley Railroad (SQVR)
- Tennessee Southern Railroad (TSRR)
- Terminal Railway Alabama State Docks (TASD)
- Three Notch Railroad (TNHR)
- Wiregrass Central Railroad (WGCR)

== Passenger Railroads ==
- Amtrak (AMTK): The Crescent and Mardi Gras Service

== Heritage and Scenic Railroads ==
- North Alabama Railroad Museum (Mercury and Chase Railroad)
- Heart of Dixie Railroad Museum (Calera and Shelby Railroad)

== Industrial Rail Operations ==
- Rapid Switching Services (switching at Kerr-McGee at Mobile)
- Southern Electric Railroad Company (SERC; Southern Company plants; trackage rights granted to Norfolk Southern)

== Defunct railroads ==
Name	Mark	System (Note: This is one or more of the Class I railroads that the railroad became part of, if any.)	From	To	Successor	Notes
Abbeville–Grimes Railway	AG		1989	1994	A&G Railroad	
Abbeville Southern Railway		ACL	1892	1901	Savannah, Florida and Western Railway	
A&G Railroad	AG		1994	1996	Bay Line Railroad	
Alabama Central Railroad (1906)			1906	1961	N/A	Commemorative website: http://www.alabamacentralrailroad.com/home/]])
Alabama Central Railroad		SOU	1871	1881	East Tennessee, Virginia and Georgia Railroad	
Alabama Central Railway			1903	1939	N/A	
Alabama and Chattanooga Railroad		SOU	1868	1877	Alabama Great Southern Railroad	
Alabama and Florida Railroad		L&N	1850	1868	Pensacola and Louisville Railroad	
Alabama and Florida Railroad		L&N	1898	1900	Louisville and Nashville Railroad	
Alabama and Florida Railroad			1936	1941	N/A	
Alabama and Florida Railroad	AFLR		1986	1992	Alabama and Florida Railway	
Alabama and Florida Railway	AF		1992	2011	N/A	
Alabama, Florida and Gulf Railroad			1917	1936	Alabama and Florida Railroad	
Alabama, Florida and Southern Railroad			1910	1917	Alabama, Florida and Gulf Railroad	
Alabama Great Southern Railroad	AGS	SOU	1877			Still exists as an operating subsidiary of the Norfolk Southern Railway
Alabama Industrial Railroad	AIRI		1984	1985	Huntsville and Madison County Railroad Authority	
Alabama Midland Railway		ACL	1887	1901	Savannah, Florida and Western Railway	
Alabama Mineral Railroad		L&N	1890	1903	Louisville and Nashville Railroad	
Alabama and Mississippi Railroad	A&M		1902	1922	Mississippi and Alabama Railroad	
Alabama and Mississippi Rivers Railroad		SOU	1850	1864	Selma and Meridian Railroad	
Alabama Northern Railway	ABN		1904	1925		
Alabama and North Western Railroad			1912	1934	N/A	
Alabama Railroad	ALAB		1991	2022	N/A	
Alabama Southern Railroad			1985	1985	N/A	Never operated (acquired property of Sumter and Choctaw Railway)
Alabama, Tennessee and Northern Railroad		SLSF	1918	1971	St. Louis – San Francisco Railway	
Alabama, Tennessee and Northern Railroad		SLSF	1906	1913	Alabama, Tennessee and Northern Railway	
Alabama, Tennessee and Northern Railway		SLSF	1913	1918	Alabama, Tennessee and Northern Railroad	
Alabama and Tennessee River Railroad		SOU	1848	1866	Selma, Rome and Dalton Railroad	
Alabama Terminal and Improvement Company		ACL	1889	1889	Alabama Midland Railway	
Alabama Terminal Railroad		ACL	1907	1916	Atlanta, Birmingham and Atlantic Railway	
Alabama and Tombigbee Railroad			1898		N/A	
Alabama Transit Company		SOU	1869	1870	Elyton and Aberdeen Railroad	
Alabama Western Railroad		IC	1905	1913	Chicago, St. Louis and New Orleans Railroad	
Americus, Preston and Lumpkin Railroad		SAL	1884	1888	Savannah, Americus and Montgomery Railway	
Andalusia and Conecuh Railroad	ACRC		1983			Still exists as a lessor of the Three Notch Railroad
Andalusia, Florida and Gulf Railway			1919	1925	N/A	
Anniston and Atlantic Railroad		L&N	1883	1890	Alabama Mineral Railroad	
Anniston and Cincinnati Railroad		L&N	1887	1890	Alabama Mineral Railroad	
Anniston Terminal Railroad		L&N	1888	1890	Anniston and Cincinnati Railroad	
Ashland Railway			1925	1940	N/A	
Atlanta and Birmingham Air Line Railway		SAL	1903	1909	Seaboard Air Line Railway	
Atlanta, Birmingham and Atlantic Railroad		ACL	1905	1916	Atlanta, Birmingham and Atlantic Railway	
Atlanta, Birmingham and Atlantic Railway		ACL	1916	1927	Atlanta, Birmingham and Coast Railroad	
Atlanta, Birmingham and Coast Railroad		ACL	1927	1946	Atlantic Coast Line Railroad	
Atlanta and St. Andrews Bay Railway	A&SA, ASAB		1906	1993	Bay Line Railroad	
Atlantic Coast Line Railroad	ACL	ACL	1902	1967	Seaboard Coast Line Railroad	
Bay Minette and Fort Morgan Railroad		L&N	1904	1921	Louisville and Nashville Railroad	
Belt Line Railway		ACL	1889	1943	Atlantic Coast Line Railroad	
Birmingham and Atlanta Air Line Railway		SAL	1902	1903	East and West Railroad	
Birmingham and Atlantic Railroad			1890	1919	N/A	
Birmingham Belt Railroad		SLSF	1899	1968	St. Louis – San Francisco Railway	
Birmingham Mineral Railroad		L&N	1884	1904	Louisville and Nashville Railroad	
Birmingham, Selma and Mobile Railroad			1913	1931	N/A	
Birmingham, Selma and New Orleans Railway		L&N	1886	1902	Louisville and Nashville Railroad	
Birmingham, Selma and Pensacola Railroad			1910	1913	Birmingham, Selma and Mobile Railroad	
Birmingham, Sheffield and Tennessee River Railway		SOU	1889	1895	Northern Alabama Railway	
Birmingham and Southeastern Railway	B&SE		1911	1965	N/A	
Birmingham and Tennessee River Railroad		SOU	1884	1885	Sheffield and Birmingham Railroad	
Birmingham Southern Railroad	BS		1899	2012	Birmingham Terminal Railway	
Birmingham Terminal Company	BTC	CG/ IC/ SAL/ SLSF/ SOU				
Birmingham and Tuscaloosa Railroad		L&N	1915	1915	Louisville and Nashville Railroad	
Brierfield, Blockton and Birmingham Railway		SOU	1889	1889	East Tennessee, Virginia and Georgia Railway	
Burlington Northern Inc.	BN		1980	1981	Burlington Northern Railroad	
Burlington Northern Railroad	BN		1981	1996	Burlington Northern and Santa Fe Railway	
Cahaba, Marion and Greensboro Railroad		SOU	1860	1868	Selma, Marion and Memphis Railroad	
Canton, Aberdeen and Nashville Railroad in Alabama		IC	1898	1913	Chicago, St. Louis and New Orleans Railroad	
Carrollton Short Line Railway		SLSF	1897	1906	Alabama, Tennessee and Northern Railroad	
Central of Georgia Railway	CG	CG	1895	1971	Central of Georgia Railroad	
Chattahoochee and Gulf Railroad	CHAT		2003	2006	Chattahoochee Bay Railroad	
Chattahoochee and Gulf Railroad		CG	1899	1948	Central of Georgia Railway	
Chattahoochee Valley Railroad			1895	1900	Chattahoochee Valley Railway	
Chattahoochee Valley Railway	CHV		1900	1992	N/A	
Chattanooga Southern Railroad		SOU	1896	1911	Tennessee, Alabama and Georgia Railroad	
Chattanooga Southern Railway		SOU	1890	1895	Chattanooga Southern Railroad	
Cheney Railroad	CHNY		1989	1996	N/A	
Chicago, St. Louis and New Orleans Railroad		IC	1913	1951	Illinois Central Railroad	
Cincinnati, Selma and Mobile Railway		SOU	1881	1890	East Tennessee, Virginia and Georgia Railway	
Columbus, Fayette and Decatur Railroad		SOU	1871	1881	Georgia Pacific Railway	
Columbus and Western Railway		CG	1880	1888	Savannah and Western Railroad	
Decatur, Chesapeake and New Orleans Railway		L&N	1887	1893	Middle Tennessee and Alabama Railway	
DeKalb and Western Railroad			1916		N/A	
East Alabama Railway		CG	1880	1888	Savannah and Western Railroad	
East Alabama and Cincinnati Railroad		CG	1868	1880	East Alabama and Cincinnati Railway	
East Alabama and Cincinnati Railway		CG	1880	1880	East Alabama Railway	
East Tennessee, Virginia and Georgia Railroad		SOU	1881	1886	East Tennessee, Virginia and Georgia Railway	
East Tennessee, Virginia and Georgia Railway		SOU	1886	1894	Southern Railway	
East and West Railroad		SAL	1894	1903	Atlanta and Birmingham Air Line Railway	
East and West Railroad of Alabama		SAL	1882	1893	East and West Railroad	
Eastern Railway of Alabama		ACL	1901	1906	Atlanta, Birmingham and Atlantic Railroad	
Elyton and Aberdeen Railroad		SOU	1870	1882	Georgia Pacific Railway	
Ensley Southern Railway		SOU	1900	1926	Southern Railway, Warrior River Terminal Company	
Escambia Railroad						
Eufaula and East Alabama Railway		CG	1887	1888	Savannah and Western Railroad	
Eufaula and Clayton Railway		CG	1883	1888	Savannah and Western Railroad	
Florence Bridge Company		SOU	1832	1850	Memphis and Charleston Railroad	
Florence Railroad and Improvement Company		L&N	1888	1897	Louisville and Nashville Railroad	
Florida and Alabama Railroad						
Florida, Alabama and Gulf Railroad			1911	1919	Andalusia, Florida and Gulf Railway	
Gadsden and Attalla Railroad		SOU	1876	1904	Southern Railway	
Gadsden and Birmingham Railroad		SOU	1910	1911	Tennessee, Alabama and Georgia Railroad	
Gainesville and Mississippi Railroad		GM&O	1852	1854	Mississippi, Gainesville and Tuscaloosa Railroad	
Georgia and Alabama Railroad	GAAB		1989	1995	Georgia Southwestern Railroad	
Georgia and Alabama Railway		SAL	1895	1902	Seaboard Air Line Railway	
Georgia Pacific Railroad		SOU	1876	1882	Georgia Pacific Railway	
Georgia Pacific Railway		SOU	1882	1894	Southern Railway	
Georgia Western Railroad		SOU	1860	1877	Georgia Pacific Railroad	
Girard Railroad		CG	1845	1854	Mobile and Girard Railroad	
Goodwater and Birmingham Railroad		CG	1886	1887	Columbus and Western Railway	
Gulf, Florida and Alabama Railway	DWR	SLSF	1911	1922	Muscle Shoals, Birmingham and Pensacola Railway	
Gulf and Mississippi Railroad	GMSR		1985	1988	SouthRail Corporation	
Gulf, Mobile and Northern Railroad	GM&N	GM&O	1915	1940	Gulf, Mobile and Ohio Railroad	
Gulf, Mobile and Ohio Railroad	GM&O, GMO	GM&O	1940	1972	Illinois Central Gulf Railroad	
Gulf Ports Terminal Railway			1916	1926	N/A	
Gulf Terminal Company		GM&O/ SOU				
Hartford and Slocomb Railroad	HS		1953	1992	H&S Railroad	
Hayneville and Montgomery Railroad			1905	1917		
H&S Railroad	HS		1992	2006	Chattahoochee Bay Railroad	
Huntsville and Elora Railroad		L&N	1887	1887	Nashville, Chattanooga and St. Louis Railway	
Illinois Central Railroad	IC	IC	1899	1972	Illinois Central Gulf Railroad	
Illinois Central Gulf Railroad	ICG		1972	1988	Illinois Central Railroad	
Indiana, Alabama and Texas Railroad		L&N	1881	1887	Louisville and Nashville Railroad	
Inland Waterways Corporation			1948	1966	Birmingham Southern Railroad	
Jefferson Warrior Railroad			1985	2009	Alabama Warrior Railway	
Kansas City, Memphis and Birmingham Railroad		SLSF	1887	1928	St. Louis – San Francisco Railway	
Kansas City Southern Railway	KCS		1994	2005	Alabama Southern Railroad	
Long Branch Coal Railroad		L&N	1901	1957	Louisville and Nashville Railroad	
Louisville and Nashville Railroad	L&N, LN	L&N	1871	1983	Seaboard System Railroad	
Manistee and Repton Railroad		L&N	1910	1965	Louisville and Nashville Railroad	
Marion Railroad		SOU	1854	1858	Marion and Cahaba Railroad	
Marion and Alabama River Transportation Company		SOU	1850	1854	Marion Railroad	
Marion and Cahaba Railroad		SOU	1858	1860	Cahaba, Marion and Greensboro Railroad	
Mary Lee Railroad				1985	Jefferson Warrior Railroad	private
Meridian and Bigbee Railroad	MBRR, MB		1952	1997	M&B Railroad	
Meridian and Bigbee River Railway			1917	1952	Meridian and Bigbee Railroad	
Memphis and Birmingham Railroad		SLSF	1886	1887	Kansas City, Memphis and Birmingham Railroad	
Memphis and Charleston Railroad		SOU	1850	1898	Southern Railway	
Middle Tennessee and Alabama Railway		L&N	1893	1897	Nashville, Chattanooga and St. Louis Railway	
Mississippi and Alabama Railroad			1922	1950	N/A	
Mississippi Central Railroad	MSC	IC	1921	1924	N/A	Trackage rights over the Gulf, Mobile and Northern Railroad to Mobile
Mississippi, Gainesville and Tuscaloosa Railroad		GM&O	1854	1870	Mobile and Ohio Railroad	
Mobile and Alabama Grand Trunk Railroad		SOU	1866	1886	Mobile and West Alabama Railroad	
Mobile and Bay Shore Railway		GM&O	1898	1903	Mobile and Ohio Railroad	
Mobile and Birmingham Railroad		SOU	1895			Still exists as a nonoperating subsidiary of the Norfolk Southern Railway
Mobile and Birmingham Railway		SOU	1887	1895	Mobile and Birmingham Railroad	
Mobile and Girard Railroad		CG	1854	1895	Central of Georgia Railway	
Mobile and Great Northern Railroad		L&N	1856	1868	Mobile and Montgomery Railroad	
Mobile and Gulf Railroad	MG		1925	1984	N/A	
Mobile, Hattiesburg and Jackson Railroad		GM&O	1887	1888	Mobile, Jackson and Kansas City Railroad	
Mobile, Jackson and Kansas City Railroad		GM&O	1888	1909	New Orleans, Mobile and Chicago Railroad	
Mobile and Montgomery Railroad		L&N	1868	1874	Mobile and Montgomery Railway	
Mobile and Montgomery Railway		L&N	1874	1900	Louisville and Nashville Railroad	
Mobile and Northwestern Railroad		GM&O	1870	1891	Mobile, Jackson and Kansas City Railroad	
Mobile and Ohio Railroad		GM&O	1848	1940	Gulf, Mobile and Ohio Railroad	
Mobile Terminal and Railway Company		SLSF	1910	1913	Alabama, Tennessee and Northern Railway	
Mobile and West Alabama Railroad		SOU	1885	1887	Mobile and Birmingham Railway	
Mobile and Western Railroad		GM&O	1906	1907	Mobile and Ohio Railroad	
Montgomery Railroad		ACL/ L&N	1834	1842	Montgomery and West Point Railroad	
Montgomery and Eufaula Railroad		CG	1860	1879	Montgomery and Eufaula Railway	
Montgomery and Eufaula Railway		CG	1879	1895	Central of Georgia Railway	
Montgomery and Florida Railway		ACL	1886	1888	Northwestern and Florida Railroad	
Montgomery, Hayneville and Camden Railroad		L&N	1890	1900	Louisville and Nashville Railroad	
Montgomery and Prattville Railroad		L&N	1895	1896	Louisville and Nashville Railroad	
Montgomery Southern Railway		ACL	1880	1886	Montgomery and Florida Railway	
Montgomery and West Point Railroad		ACL/ L&N	1843	1870	Western Railroad of Alabama	
Muscle Shoals, Birmingham and Pensacola Railroad	MSBP	SLSF	1924	1928	St. Louis – San Francisco Railway	
Muscle Shoals, Birmingham and Pensacola Railway	MSBP	SLSF	1922	1924	Muscle Shoals, Birmingham and Pensacola Railroad	
Nashville and Chattanooga Railroad		L&N	1850	1873	Nashville, Chattanooga and St. Louis Railway	
Nashville, Chattanooga and St. Louis Railway	N&C, NC	L&N	1873	1957	Louisville and Nashville Railroad	
Nashville and Decatur Railroad		L&N	1866	1990	CSX Transportation	
Nashville, Florence and Sheffield Railway		L&N	1887	1900	Louisville and Nashville Railroad	
New and Old Decatur Belt and Terminal Railroad		L&N	1890	1892	Louisville and Nashville Railroad	
New Orleans, Mobile and Chattanooga Railroad		L&N	1866	1871	New Orleans, Mobile and Texas Railroad	
New Orleans, Mobile and Chicago Railroad		GM&O	1909	1915	Gulf, Mobile and Northern Railroad	
New Orleans, Mobile and Texas Railroad		L&N	1871	1881	Louisville and Nashville Railroad	
New Orleans and Selma Railroad		L&N	1866	1868	New Orleans and Selma Railroad and Immigration Association	
New Orleans and Selma Railroad and Immigration Association		L&N	1868	1886	Birmingham, Selma and New Orleans Railway	
North Alabama Railroad		L&N	1900	1910	Louisville and Nashville Railroad	
North East and South West Alabama Railroad		SOU	1853	1868	Alabama and Chattanooga Railroad	
Northern Alabama Railway		SOU	1895	1939	Southern Railway	
Northwestern Railroad of Alabama		SOU	1854	1868	Selma, Marion and Memphis Railroad	
Northwestern and Florida Railroad		ACL	1888	1889	Alabama Terminal and Improvement Company	
Oak Grove and Georgetown Railroad			1904	1927	N/A	
Oneonta and Attalla Railroad		L&N	1900	1905	Louisville and Nashville Railroad	
Opelika and Talladega Railroad		CG	1854	1861	Opelika and Tuscumbia Railroad	
Opelika and Tuscumbia Railroad		CG	1861	1866	Savannah and Memphis Railroad	
Pensacola, Mobile and New Orleans Railway			1907	1917	Gulf Ports Terminal Railway	
Pensacola and Selma Railroad		L&N	1880	1880	Louisville and Nashville Railroad	
Pine Belt Southern Railroad	PBRR		1995	2001	N/A	
Plant System		ACL	1894	1902	Atlantic Coast Line Railroad	
Richmond and Danville Railroad		SOU	1889	1894	Southern Railway	
Rome and Decatur Railroad		SOU	1882	1889	East Tennessee, Virginia and Georgia Railway	
St. Louis and San Francisco Railroad		SLSF	1903	1916	St. Louis – San Francisco Railway	
St. Louis – San Francisco Railway	SLSF	SLSF	1916	1980	Burlington Northern Inc.	
Savannah, Americus and Montgomery Railway		SAL	1888	1895	Georgia and Alabama Railway	
Savannah, Florida and Western Railway		ACL	1901	1902	Atlantic Coast Line Railroad	
Savannah and Memphis Railroad		CG	1866	1880	Columbus and Western Railway	
Savannah and Western Railroad		CG	1885	1895	Central of Georgia Railway	
Seaboard Railroad of Alabama			1890	1900	Tombigbee and Northern Railway	
Seaboard Air Line Railroad	SAL	SAL	1946	1967	Seaboard Coast Line Railroad	
Seaboard Air Line Railway		SAL	1900	1945	Seaboard Air Line Railroad	
Seaboard Coast Line Railroad	SCL		1967	1983	Seaboard System Railroad	
Seaboard System Railroad	SBD		1983	1986	CSX Transportation	
Selma and Gulf Railroad		L&N	1858	1879	Pensacola and Selma Railroad	
Selma and Greensboro Railroad		SOU	1878	1881	Cincinnati, Selma and Mobile Railway	
Selma, Marion and Memphis Railroad		SOU	1868	1878	Selma and Greensboro Railroad	
Selma and Meridian Railroad		SOU	1864	1871	Alabama Central Railroad	
Selma, Rome and Dalton Railroad		SOU	1866	1880	East Tennessee, Virginia and Georgia Railroad	
Sheffield and Birmingham Railroad		SOU	1885	1887	Sheffield and Birmingham Coal, Iron and Railway Company	
Sheffield and Birmingham Coal, Iron and Railway Company		SOU	1887	1889	Birmingham, Sheffield and Tennessee River Railway	
Sheffield and Tuscumbia Railroad		L&N	1895	1896	Louisville and Nashville Railroad	
Sheffield and Tuscumbia Street Railway		L&N	1886	1895	Sheffield and Tuscumbia Railroad	
South and North Alabama Railroad		L&N	1854	1914	Louisville and Nashville Railroad	
Southern Railway	SOU	SOU	1894	1990	Norfolk Southern Railway	
Southern Alabama Railroad	SUAB		1988	2001	Conecuh Valley Railroad	
Southern Alabama Railroad		L&N	1899	1899	Louisville and Nashville Railroad	
SouthRail Corporation	SR		1988	1994	Kansas City Southern Railway	
Southwestern Railroad		CG	1859			Owned by Central of Georgia Railway; still exists as a lessor of Norfolk Southern Railway operating subsidiary Central of Georgia Railroad
Southwestern Alabama Railway		ACL	1896	1901	Savannah, Florida and Western Railway	
Sumter and Choctaw Railway	SC		1904	1983	Alabama Southern Railroad (never operated)	
Sylacauga and Wetumpka Railroad			1902	1911		
Talladega and Coosa Valley Railroad			1883	1890	Birmingham and Atlantic Railroad	
Tallassee and Montgomery Railway			1895	1912	Birmingham and Southeastern Railway	
Tennessee and Alabama Railroad		L&N	1887	1887	Nashville, Florence and Sheffield Railway	
Tennessee and Alabama Central Railroad		L&N	1853	1866	Nashville and Decatur Railroad	
Tennessee, Alabama and Georgia Railroad		SOU	1911	1922	Tennessee, Alabama and Georgia Railway	
Tennessee, Alabama and Georgia Railway	TA&G, TAG	SOU	1922			Still exists as an operating subsidiary of the Norfolk Southern Railway
Tennessee Coal and Iron Railroad						
Tennessee and Coosa Railroad		L&N	1844	1891	Nashville, Chattanooga and St. Louis Railway	
Tennessee Valley Railroad		SOU	1848	1851	Memphis and Charleston Railroad	
Tombigbee and Northern Railway			1900	1904	Tombigbee Valley Railroad	
Tombigbee Valley Railroad		SLSF	1904	1913	Alabama, Tennessee and Northern Railway	
Tredegar Mineral Railway		SAL	1891	1900	East and West Railroad	
Tuscaloosa Mineral Railroad		L&N	1910	1915	Birmingham and Tuscaloosa Railroad	
Tuscumbia Railway		SOU	1830	1850	Memphis and Charleston Railroad	
Tuscumbia, Courtland and Decatur Railroad		SOU	1832	1847	Tennessee Valley Railroad	
Tuskegee Railroad	TK		1860	1963	N/A	
Tyson Railroad	TSNR		1989	1992	CSX Transportation	
Union Springs and Northern Railway			1901	1911	Birmingham and Southeastern Railway	
Vicksburg and Brunswick Railroad		CG	1867	1879	Eufaula and Clayton Railway	
Vredenburgh Saw Mill Company						
Warrior River Terminal Company			1926	1948	Inland Waterways Corporation	
Warrior Southern Railway			1901	1938	Twin Seam Mining Company	Owned by Mobile and Ohio Railroad
Washington and Choctaw Railway			1910	1927	N/A	
Western Railroad of Alabama		ACL/ L&N	1860	1883	Western Railway of Alabama	
Western Railway of Alabama	WA	ACL/ L&N	1883	2002	CSX Transportation	
Wills Valley Railroad		SOU	1852	1868	Alabama and Chattanooga Railroad	
Winchester and Alabama Railroad		SOU	1850	1875	Memphis and Charleston Railroad	
Woodstock and Blocton Railway		L&N/ SOU	1906			Still exists; owned by CSX Transportation and the Norfolk Southern Railway but operated by the latter
Woodward Iron Company						private
Yellow River Railroad		L&N	1887	1906	Louisville and Nashville Railroad	

Electric railways

- Birmingham and Edgewood Electric Railway
- Birmingham Railway and Electric Company
- Birmingham Street Railway
- Birmingham–Tuscaloosa Railway and Utilities Company
- Metropolitan Rapid Transit, Light and Power Company
