= Tuskegee Railroad =

Former railroad in Alabama, US

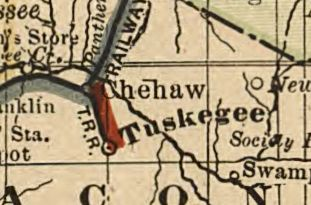

Overview
- Locale: Tuskegee, Alabama
- Dates of operation: 1860–1963

Technical
- Track gauge: 3 ft (914 mm) 36" gauge, converted to Standard Gauge in 1898

The Tuskegee Railroad was a 5 and 1/2 mile long railroad that connected Tuskegee, Alabama to the Montgomery and West Point Railroad at the nearby village of Chehaw. First constructed in 1860 by the Tuskegee Rail Road Company, it was subsequently destroyed in the American Civil War and then sold to E. T. Varner & Company, which rebuilt it and reincorporated it as the Tuskegee Railroad Company in 1872. Again incorporated in 1902 as the Tuskegee Railroad, one of the railroad's primary purposes in the early 20th century was to connect the Tuskegee Institute to other railroad lines.

== History ==
=== 1860 Founding ===
On February 20, 1860, the State of Alabama granted a charter to incorporate the Tuskegee Railroad. The Railroad owners were David Clopton, William Foster, Cullen A. Battle, Robert F. Ligon, J.W. Echols, S. B. Baine, G.W. Campbell, A. B. Fanin, John C. H. Reid, W. G. Swanson and A. D. Edwards. In 1860, 500 enslaved Africans worked building the railroad under lease agreements with plantation owners who collected pay for the slave's labor.

=== Civil War - Rail Destroyed ===
U.S. General Sherman sent U.S. General Lovell Rousseau on a raid of the Montgomery and West Point Railroad where he destroyed rail to the Chehaw Station of the Tuskegee Railroad, cutting of connections to the Tuskegee Railroad from all points. The Tuskegee Railroad was melted down by Confederates for armaments for the American Civil War.

=== 1872 Reconstruction ===
William G. Swanson and others bought the defunct railroad in 1869 and signed an agreement with E. T. Varner & Company, which rebuilt the railroad by 1872. It was run by E. T. Varner & Company as the Tuskegee Railroad until 1902 when it was incorporated under the same name and owned by E. T. Varner, L. V. Alexander and Campbell & Wright. Rates were 10 cents per mile in 1882.

=== 1943 Tuskegee Airman ===
Benjamin O. Davis Jr. of the World War II Tuskegee Airmen remembered the 99 Squadron of bombers riding on the Tuskegee Railroad in 1943. He mentions segregation in his autobiography, unfair treatment of black people and the 19 Pullman drawing room where the railroad put black politicians so they would not see worse effects of segregation.

=== Sale of Railroad in 1963 ===
When Interstate 85 was built through Alabama and Alabama State Route 81 was widened connecting the Tuskegee Institute to the Interstate in 1963, the need for the railroad was gone and the railroad received permission from the Interstate Commerce Commission to no longer operate. Trains were salvaged and warehouses were built where the depot was demolished after some of the property was sold.

=== 1978 Literature ===
Ralph Ellison wrote The Little Man at Chehaw Station: The American Artist and His Audience about a jazz musician playing a street performance in the Great Depression. The setting used was the Chehaw Station of the Tuskegee Railroad.

== Line ==
=== Stations ===
- Chehaw (Junction with Montgomery and West Point Railroad (Old Chehaw Rd) The line is connected to Western Railway of Alabama
- Tuskegee 6

The train made three round trips, one at night. It took about 1 hour and thirty minutes to go one way.

=== Rolling stock ===
In 1876 the railway had one 10-ton-locomotive, 1 passenger car and 3 freight cars of all classes.

Between 1888 through 1916 the Tuskegee Railroad Company had two locomotives, one to two passenger car and a baggage and mail car. The only surviving locomotive, 101, a 2-6-2, was donated to the Illinois Railway Museum where it would serve as the museum's mainline locomotive until 1989.
