= List of reporting marks: J =

Note: Marks ending in U are for container owners; marks ending in X are not common carriers; marks ending in Z are for trailers without flanged wheels. All other marks are of common-carrier railroads.

== J ==
- JAIL - Jackson and Lansing Railroad
- JAAU - Jordan Bromine Company
- JACX - Johnstown America Corporation
- JAIX - JAIX Leasing Corporation
- JALX - JAIX Leasing Corporation
- JANX - JAN, Inc.
- JBHU - J.B. Hunt Transport, Inc.
- JBHZ - J.B. Hunt Transport, Inc.
- JBIX - Tank Car Services, Inc.
- JBPX - PacifiCorp Electric Operations and Idaho Power Company (Jim Bridger Project)
- JBRX - Bakery Trading Company
- JBTU - Jumbotainer BV Barendecht
- JCDX - Jefferson County Drainage District No. 6
- JCEX - John S. Carlson and Company, Inc.
- JCIX - Jones Chemicals, Inc.
- JCLX - Mid-Am Equipment, Inc.
- JCMX - James C. McCanless
- JCSX - Sawyer Gas of Jacksonville, Inc., Heritage Operating, LP
- JDHX - J.D. Heiskell & Co, LLC
- JDIX - Jim Dobbas, Inc.
- JDMX - The David J. Joseph Co.
- JDSX - M and C Railcar Leasing, LLC
- JE - Jerseyville and Eastern, Joppa and Eastern Railroad
- JECX - Western Resources, Inc.
- JEFW - Jefferson Warrior Railroad
- JEPX - PSI Energy, Inc.
- JFDX - W. K. Horney
- JGLU - Juglinija Lines
- JGRU - John G. Russell Transport, Ltd.
- JGS - James Griffiths and Sons
- JHMX - Alabama Power Company
- JHPX - Huntsman Chemical Corporation, NOVA Chemicals
- JJJX - JJ Railcar Leasing, Ltd.
- JJRD - J and J Railroad
- JKBX - John Kenneth Burbridge
- JKL - J.K. Line, Inc.
- JKWI - Johnsonburg, Kane, Warren and Irvine Railroad
- JLAU - Japan Line, Ltd.
- JLDU - Japan Line, Ltd.
- JLEU - Japan Line, Ltd.
- JLEZ - Japan Line, Ltd.
- JLHU - Japan Line, Ltd.
- JLLU - Japan Line, Ltd.
- JLLX - LaRoche Industries, Inc.
- JLLZ - Japan Line, Ltd.
- JLMU - Japan Line, Ltd.
- JLMX - John L. McCarthy
- JLPU - Japan Line, Ltd.
- JLSU - Japan Line, Ltd.
- JLSZ - Japan Line, Ltd.
- JLTU - Japan Line, Ltd.
- JMHX - J. M. Huber Corporation
- JMJZ - J.M.J. Projects, Inc.
- JNSX - JNS Marketing Company (Coastline Rail Service Division)
- JNTX - John Neas Tank Lines
- JOBX - Tealinc, Ltd.
- JORX - Jormac, SA de CV
- JOSX - The David J. Joseph Co.
- JOTU - Japan Oil Transportation Company, Ltd.
- JPBX - Peninsula Corridor Joint Powers Board (Caltrain)
- JPTU - Daikin Industries
- JPWX - Junior Police Works, Inc
- JRCX - GLNX Corporation
- JRSX - J. R. Simplot Company
- JRTX - Jefferson Energy Companies
- JRWX - Johnson Railway Service, Inc.
- JSCU - Flexi-Van Leasing, Inc.
- JSCZ - Flexi-Van Leasing, Inc.
- JSRC - Jackson and Southern Railroad
- JSRW - Jersey Southern Railway
- JSSU - China Navigation Company, Ltd.
- JSSX - Jersey Shore Steel Company
- JTAX - Trinity Rail Management, Inc.
- JTCO - Jacksonville Terminal Company
- JTFX - Joseph Leasing, Ltd.
- JTHX - Thomas D. Hicks, Citicorp Railmark, Inc.
- JTIX - The David J. Joseph Co.
- JTJX - The David J. Joseph Co.
- JTLX - The David J. Joseph Co.; CIT Group/Capital Finance, Inc.
- JTMX - ISG Resources, Inc.
- JTPX - The David J. Joseph Co.
- JTSX - The David J. Joseph Co.
- JTSZ - Jontri Transportation Company
- JTTX - TTX Company
- JUGU - Jogolinja
- JVRR - Juniata Valley Railroad
- JWAX - GE Rail Services Corporation
- JWFX - J. W. Flammer Company, Inc.
- JWRX - Jim Walter Resources, Inc., Alabama Power Company
