= 9th Ohio Cavalry Regiment =

- Active: October 3, 1862, to August 2, 1865
- Country: United States
- Allegiance: Union
- Branch: Cavalry
- Equipment: Smith carbine
- Engagements: Knoxville Campaign; Siege of Atlanta; Battle of Lovejoy's Station; Sherman's March to the Sea; Carolinas campaign Battle of Bentonville

The 9th Ohio Cavalry Regiment was a cavalry regiment that served in the Union Army during the American Civil War.

== Service ==
Four companies were initially organized as the 9th Ohio Cavalry (1st Battalion) at Zanesville, Ohio October 3, 1862, and mustered in for a three years under the command of Colonel William Douglas Hamilton. The 9th Ohio Cavalry Regiment completed organization at or near full strength with the 2nd Battalion organized at Camp Dennison near Cincinnati, Ohio, November 6, 1863, and the 3rd battalion also organized at Camp Dennison, December 16, 1863. The regiment consolidated at Athens, Alabama, in February 1864.

The regiment was attached to 2nd Brigade, 1st Division, XXIII Corps, Army of the Ohio, to July 1863 (1st battalion). 2nd Brigade, 4th Division, XXIII Corps, to October 1863 (1st battalion). 4th Brigade, 4th Division, XXIII Corps, to November 1863 (1st battalion). 2nd Brigade, 2nd Division, Cavalry Corps, Army of the Ohio, to March 1864 (1st battalion). Athens, Florence, and Decatur, Alabama, District of North Alabama, Department of the Cumberland, to August 1864 (regiment). Mounted Brigade, Garrard's Cavalry Division, XXIII Corps, Army of the Ohio, to October 1864. 2nd Brigade, Kilpatrick's 3rd Division, Cavalry Corps, Military Division Mississippi, to June 1865. Department of North Carolina to August 1865.

The 9th Ohio Cavalry mustered out of service August 2, 1865, at Lexington, North Carolina.

== Detailed service ==
Moved to Camp Dennison, Ohio, December 1, 1862, and served duty there until April 1863. Moved to Lexington, Ky., April 23, 1863, then to Manchester, Ky., and duty there until June 15. Expedition into eastern Tennessee June 15–28, 1863. Pine Mountain Gap June 16. Big Creek Gap June 17. Wartzburg June 18. Knoxville June 19–20. Moved to London, Ky., then to Stanford July 5, and to Danville July 7. Pursuit of Morgan and Scott July 10–26. Moved to Glasgow, Ky., August 1. Burnside's Campaign in eastern Tennessee August 16-October 17. Occupation of Knoxville September 2. Kingsport September 18. Bristol September 19. Zollicoffer September 20–21. Hall's Ford, Watauga River September 22. Carter's Depot and Blountsville September 22. Blue Springs October 10. Rheatown October 11. Blountsville October 14. Bristol October 15. Knoxville Campaign November 4-December 23. Siege of Knoxville November 17-December 6. Kimbrough's Cross Roads January 16. Operations about Dandridge January 16–17. Dandridge January 17. Operations about Dandridge January 26–28. Fair Garden January 27. Duty at Knoxville, Tenn., until March. The 2nd and 3rd battalions were organized and left Ohio under orders for Nashville, Tenn., February 6, 1864, then moved to Athens, Ala., where they were joined by the 1st battalion. Patrol duty along the Tennessee River at Athens and Florence, Ala., until May. Moved to Decatur, Ala., May 1–5. Repulse of attack on Decatur May 8. Centre Star May 15. Duty at Decatur until July 10. Expedition to Pulaski June 1–12. Operations in District of North Alabama July 24-August 20. Curtis Wells June 24. Pond Springs June 29. Rousseau's Opelika Raid to Atlanta & West Point Railroad July 10–22. Ten Island Ford, Coosa River, July 13. Courtland, Ala., July 25. Near Auburn and Chehaw Station July 18. Siege of Atlanta July 25-August 25. McCook's Raid on Atlanta and West Point and Macon & Western Railroad July 27–31 (detachment). Lovejoy's Station July 29. Near Newnan's July 30. Near East Point August 30. Big Shanty September 2. Ordered to Nashville, Tenn., then to Louisville, Ky., to refit. March to the sea November 15-December 10. Bear Creek Station November 16. Walnut Creek and East Macon November 20. Waynesboro November 27–28. Buckhead Creek or Reynolds' Plantation November 28. Rocky Creek Church December 2. Waynesboro December 4. Buck Creek December 7. Cypress Swamp near Sister's Ferry December 7. Ebenezer Creek December 8. Siege of Savannah December 10–21. Campaign of the Carolinas January to April 1865. Barnwell, S.C., February 6. Aiken and Blackville February 11. Phillips' Cross Roads March 4. Taylor's Hole Creek, Averysboro March 16. Battle of Bentonville, N.C., March 19–21. Occupation of Goldsboro March 23. Raleigh April 13. Morristown April 13. Bennett's House April 26. Surrender of Johnston and his army. Duty at Concord, N.C., until July 20.

== Casualties ==
The regiment lost a total of 205 men during service; 1 officer and 16 enlisted men killed or mortally wounded, 2 officers and 186 enlisted men died of disease.

== Commanders ==
- Colonel William Douglas Hamilton - Brevetted Brigadier General, April 9, 1865; mustered out with regiment, July 20, 1865

== In popular culture ==
A soldier from the regiment is featured in a scene in Chapter 3 of MacKinlay Kantor's Pulitzer Prize-winning novel, Andersonville (1955).

== See also ==
- List of Ohio Civil War units
- Ohio in the Civil War
