= Alabama Southern Railroad =

Railroad in Alabama

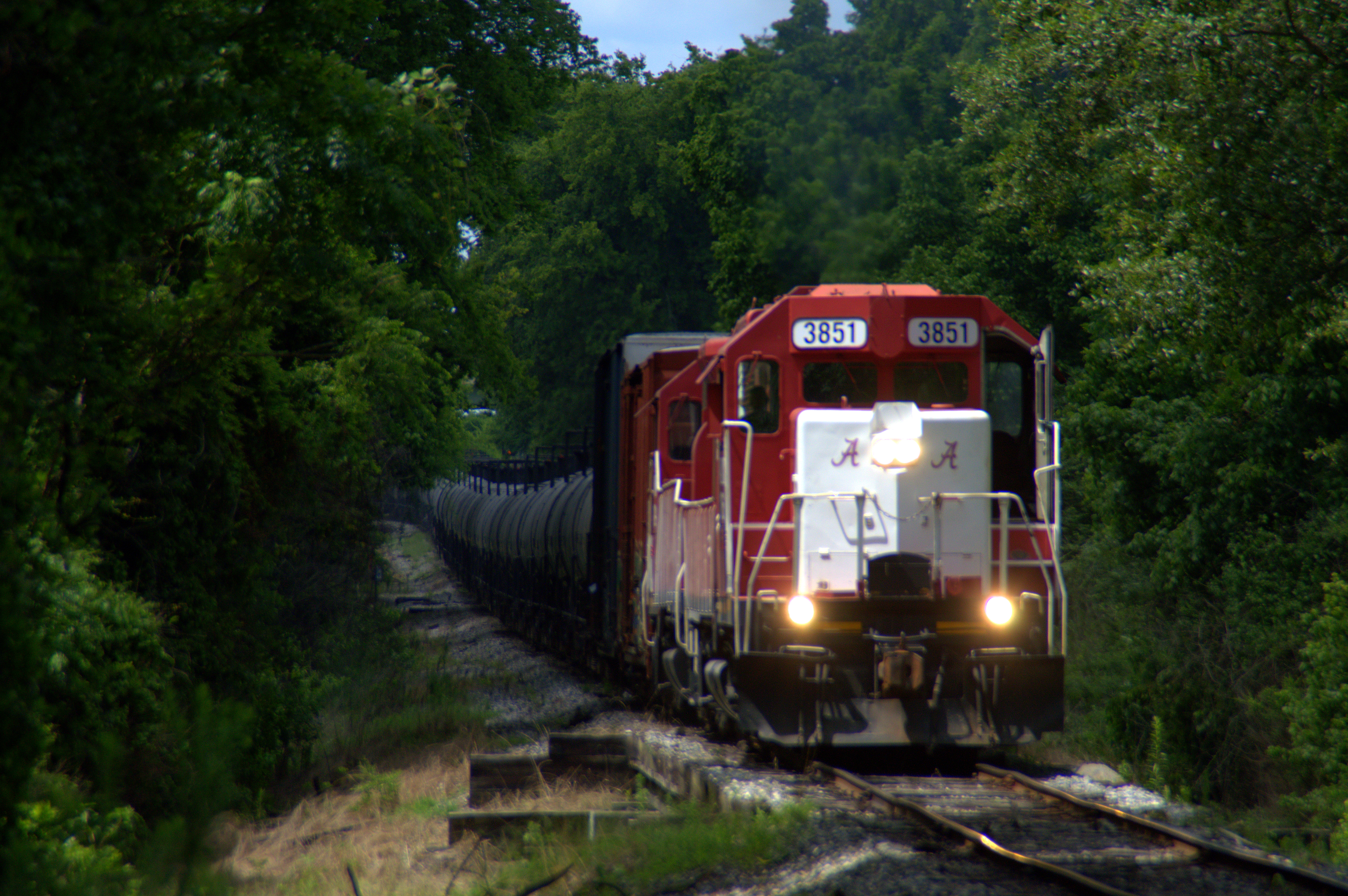
- Alabama Southern Railroad freight in Tuscaloosa on June 20, 2016

Overview
- Headquarters: Tuscaloosa, Alabama
- Reporting mark: ABS
- Locale: Alabama and Mississippi
- Dates of operation: 2005–

Technical
- Track gauge: 4 ft 8 1/2 in (1,435 mm)
- Length: 85 miles (137 km)

Other
- Website: Official website

The Alabama Southern Railroad (reporting mark ABS) is a class III railroad that operates in the southern United States. The ABS is one of several short line railroads owned by Watco. The railroad operates an 85-mile (137 km) line leased from the Canadian Pacific Kansas City (CPKC). It began operating in 2005.

== History ==
The railroad began operating on November 20, 2005, on lines leased from the Kansas City Southern Railway.

The line was originally constructed by the Mobile & Ohio Railroad which was purchased through a foreclosure sale by the Gulf, Mobile & Ohio Railroad (GM&O) on August 1, 1940. The GM&O merged with the Illinois Central on August 10, 1972, resulting in the Illinois Central Gulf Railroad. On March 31, 1986, MidSouth Rail purchased 373 miles (600 km) of track, which included this line, from the Illinois Central Gulf. On January 1, 1994, the Kansas City Southern Railway bought out Midsouth Rail.

== Lines ==
The Alabama Southern's line is composed of three Kansas City Southern branch lines totaling 85.6 miles (137.8 km):

- The Tuscaloosa Subdivision (Columbus–Tuscaloosa)
- The Warrior Branch (Tuscaloosa–Fox, Alabama)
- The Brookwood Branch (Brookwood, Alabama–Brookwood Junction).

The line runs between Columbus and Brookwood, with trackage rights over the Kansas City Southern from Columbus to Artesia, Mississippi. The railroad interchanges with the KCSR at Artesia, CSX Transportation in Brookwood, and the Norfolk Southern Railway in Tuscaloosa.

== See also ==
- List of United States railroads
- List of Alabama railroads
- Watco List of all of Watco's railroads

== Notes ==
- Alabama Southern Rail Map
- Trains.com Information on MidSouth Rail
- SPV's Comprehensive Railroad Atlas of North America – Southern States by Mike Walker (Steam Powered Publishing & SPV, 2001) Ownership and detail of rail line.
