= 1906 Mississippi hurricane =

Category 3 Atlantic hurricane in 1906

Hurricane Six 1906 Mississippi hurricane
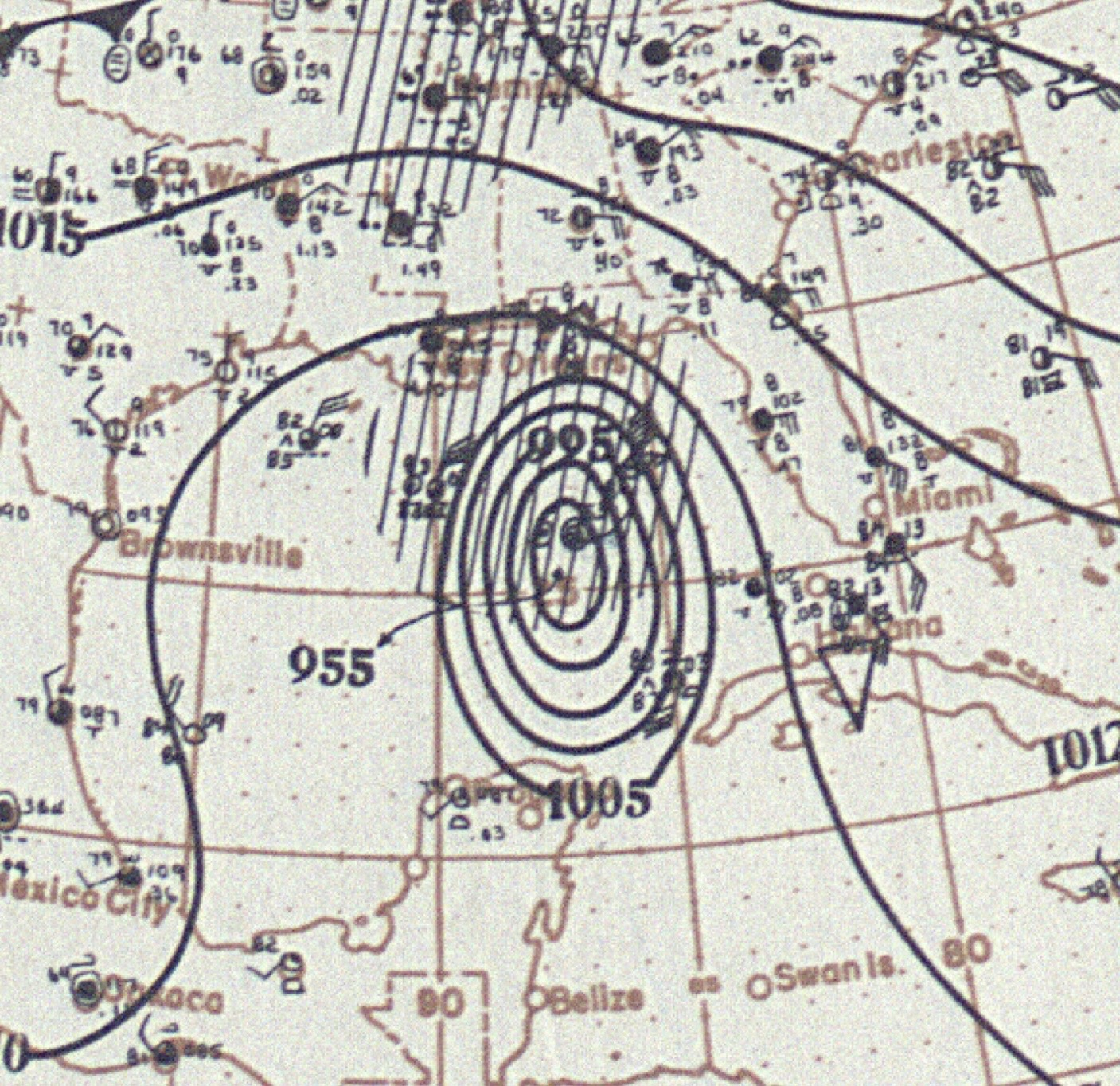
- Surface weather map on September 26, showing the hurricane near peak intensity as it approaches the U.S Gulf Coast

Meteorological history
- Formed: September 19, 1906
- Dissipated: September 29, 1906

Category 3 major hurricane
- 1-minute sustained (SSHWS/NWS)
- Highest winds: 120 mph (195 km/h)
- Lowest pressure: 953 mbar (hPa); 28.14 inHg

Overall effects
- Fatalities: At least 134
- Damage: >$19,221 (1906 USD)
- Areas affected: Southeastern United States
- IBTrACS
- Part of the 1906 Atlantic hurricane season

The 1906 Mississippi hurricane was a deadly and destructive hurricane during the 1906 Atlantic hurricane season. The fourth hurricane of the season, the system was originally observed in the western Caribbean on September 22; however, modern research revealed that the system became a tropical depression on September 19. The system slowly intensified, eventually becoming a major hurricane by September 24. The system made landfall near Pascagoula, Mississippi, during the evening of September 27, devastating the cities of Pensacola and Mobile and the state of Mississippi. Damage totaled to at least $19,221,000, and more than 134 people were killed.

== Meteorological history ==
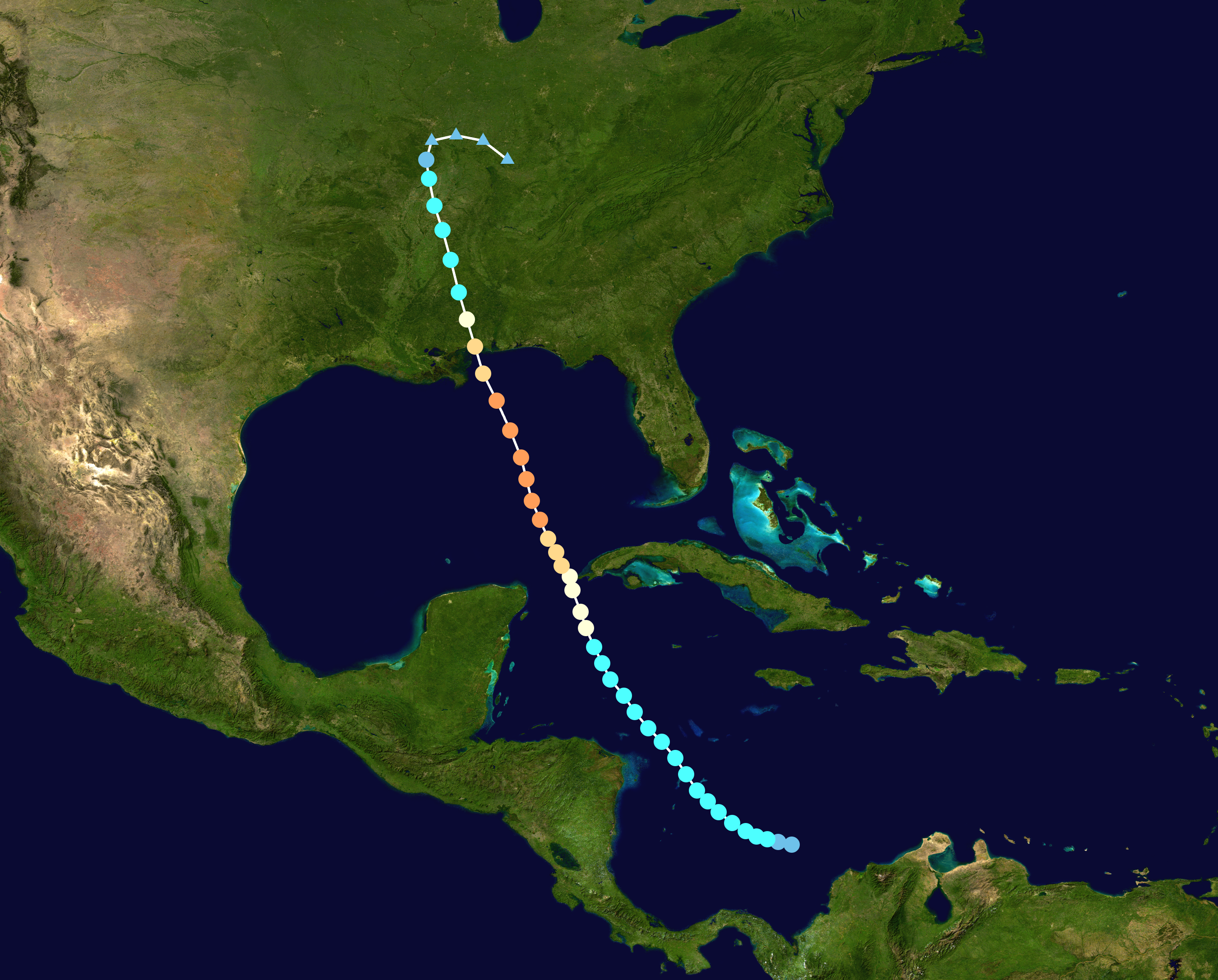
Map plotting the storm's track and intensity, according to the Saffir–Simpson scale Map key Saffir–Simpson scale Tropical depression (≤38 mph, ≤62 km/h) Tropical storm (39–73 mph, 63–118 km/h) Category 1 (74–95 mph, 119–153 km/h) Category 2 (96–110 mph, 154–177 km/h) Category 3 (111–129 mph, 178–208 km/h) Category 4 (130–156 mph, 209–251 km/h) Category 5 (≥157 mph, ≥252 km/h) Unknown Storm type Tropical cyclone Subtropical cyclone Extratropical cyclone, remnant low, tropical disturbance, or monsoon depression

The first documented information on the storm places it in the western Caribbean Sea on September 22, although modern reanalysis of this storm identifies it as a tropical depression on September 19. The storm drifted north from the Yucatán Channel on September 24, while it was a weak hurricane with winds of 75 mph (120 km/h). The hurricane was south-southwest of Havana by morning, and as it drifted north-northwestward during the evening hours of September 24, the system intensified into a Category 2 hurricane.

The hurricane was documented to have been about 300 miles (480 km) west-northwest of Cuba on September 25. Near this area, the hurricane had intensified further into a Category 3 hurricane, with maximum sustained winds of 115 mph (185 km/h). The system finished its passage into the Gulf of Mexico by September 27. During the afternoon, the hurricane made landfall near Pascagoula, Mississippi, as a Category 2 hurricane. The hurricane moved inland, weakening to a Category 1 hurricane and eventually to a tropical storm. The storm weakened to a tropical depression, and dissipated on September 29 as it transitioned into an extratropical storm.

== Preparations and impact ==
Damage by region
Region	Damage
Pensacola and vicinity	$3,860,000+
Other areas of Florida	$65,000+
Mobile and vicinity	$2,700,000+
Other areas of Alabama	$221,000+
Mississippi	$12,300,000+
Louisiana	$75,000+
Total	$19,221,000+

=== Florida ===
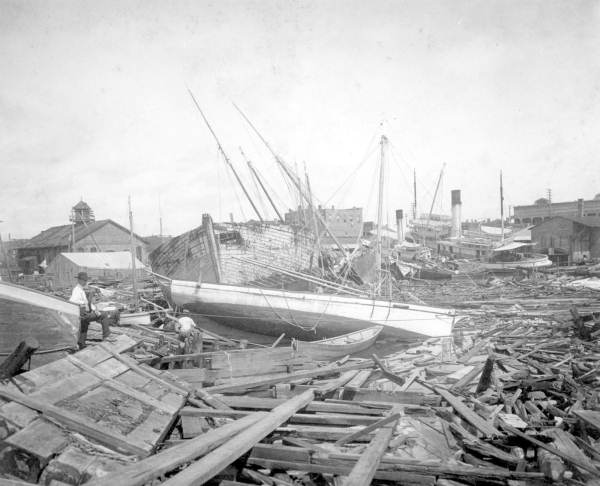
View of Pensacola Harbor following the storm

The city of Pensacola suffered the most severe damage caused by the storm. Several tugboats, vessels, fishing boats, and other watercraft were tossed along the shore of the city. Large numbers of trees were uprooted and the roofs of houses were torn off. At its highest, the storm surge of the hurricane was 8.5 feet (2.6 m) above the normal tide, the highest recorded in the city at the time. The city's waterfront was completely flooded, along with some houses near the waterfront. Muscogee wharf was partially destroyed, broken into two pieces. On either side of the wharf, railroad tracks had been washed away. A total of 39 freight cars carrying coal were also washed away. In addition, the grain elevator of the Louisville and Nashville Railroad was destroyed during the hurricane. A timber boom was demolished during the hurricane, leaving wood and debris on the beach.

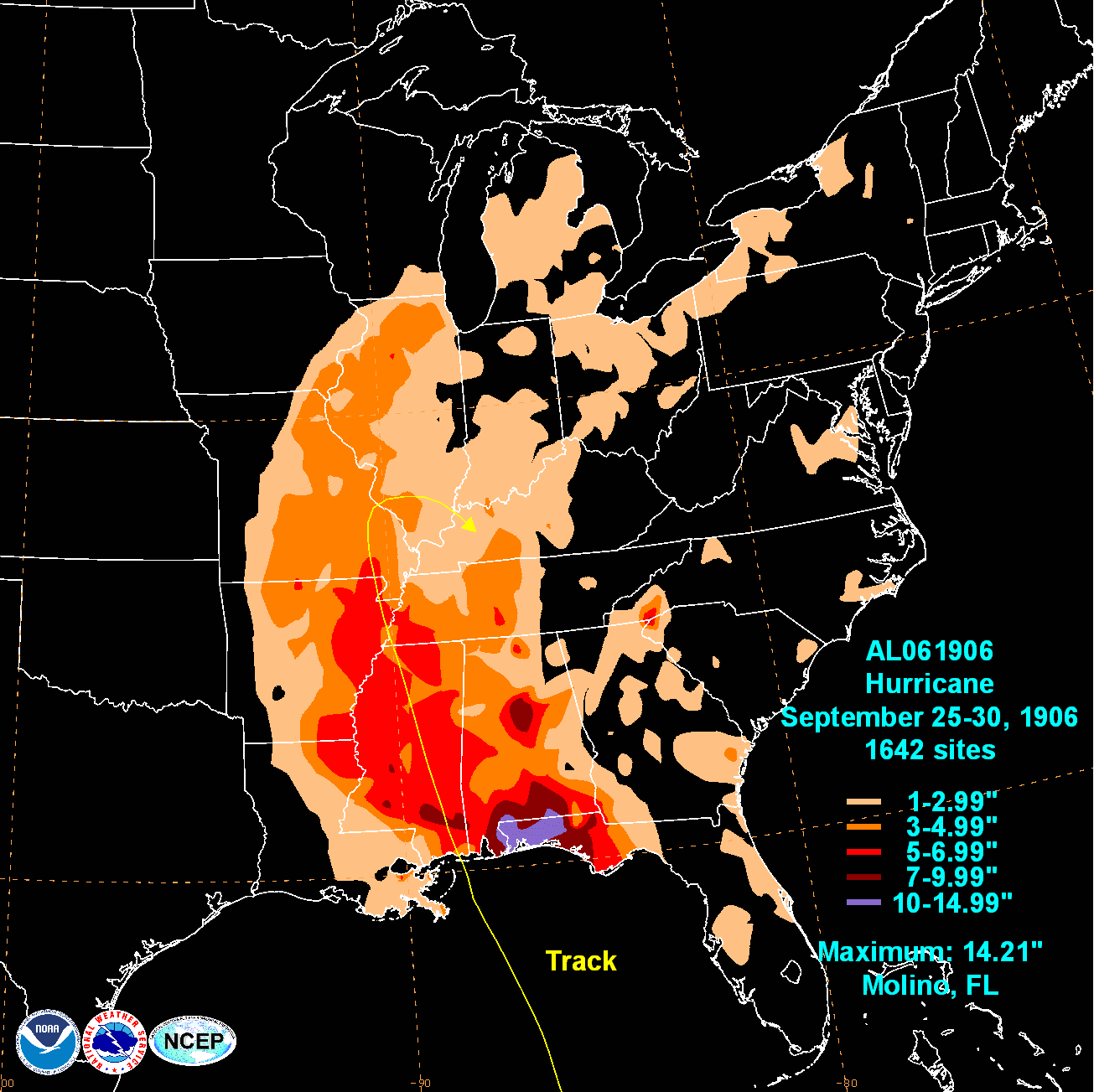
Map of the total rainfall across the United States from the hurricane

Along Intendencia Street, several cottages were flooded; in some areas, the floodwaters were 10 feet (3.0 m) deep. The southern end of West Main Street was completely inundated and was swept away. There was devastation between Barcelona and Perdido streets, with several boats wrecked. Between Palafox Street and Wright Street, many houses' roofs were torn away. Rail service in and out of Pensacola was severely affected; one train arrived several hours later than scheduled, and it was said that it had to stop "every few yards" in order to remove trees and debris covering the track. Between Magnolia Bluff and Milton, the track was destroyed and the Escambia Bridge was partially demolished. The fishing industry of Pensacola was estimated to have suffered at least $500,000 in damage. Many wharfs had been completely destroyed during the hurricane. Electricity was shut off during the hurricane.

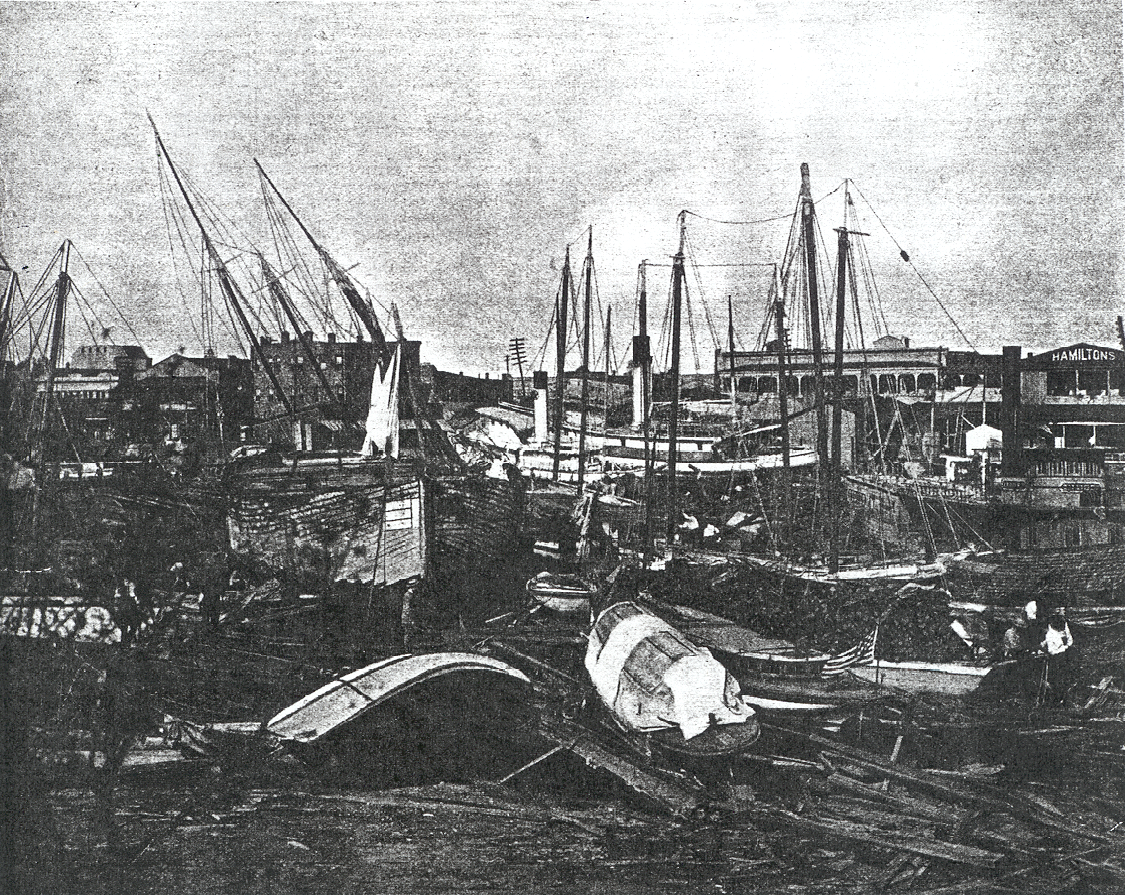
Shipping damage from hurricane in Pensacola

Fort Barrancas, Fort Pickens, and Fort McRee suffered severe damage. At Forts Pickens and Barrancas, damage was estimated to be around $10,000. In the Bayou Grande area of Pensacola, the tide was estimated to be about 12 feet (3.7 m) above normal. At the intersection of Cedar and Baylen streets, oyster boats, steam tugs, wood, and other debris were scattered. A boat identified as the Wolverine was tossed into a lot near the corner. Trees and chimneys were blown down, and a tin roof was peeled off a house as a result of strong winds. On the 26th port, one bark was completely destroyed, while another eleven were tossed around. A schooner that sank during the hurricane was tipped over. At the 38th port, 29 schooners were thrown ashore, and another sixteen were completely destroyed. Only eight of the 36 lumber barges floated, while three of eight tugs were floating, and of those three of them were wrecked. Other debris was scattered around the city, including pieces of shattered glass. A fire occurred at a hotel in Pensacola.

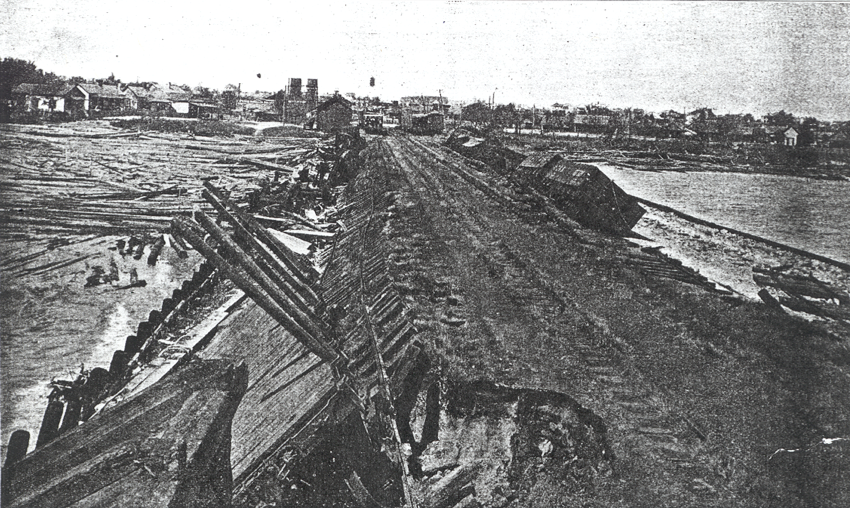
Damage caused by the hurricane in Pensacola

At the navy yard of Pensacola, all but three boats—the Isle de Luzon and two "water boats"—were either sunk or thrown ashore. A steel dock owned by Spain was untouched, but areas surrounding it were littered with debris. In the towns of Wosley and Warrington, waterfronts were severely damaged and some houses washed away. At Pensacola Bay, the tide was 10 feet (3.0 m) high; at East Bay, the tide was measured at 9 feet (2.7 m); at St. Andrews Bay, the tide was 6 feet (1.8 m) high; and at Apalachicola Bay, the tide was 5 feet (1.5 m) high. The damage caused in the city totaled to at least $2,620,000, while the damage within the vicinity of the city amounted to more than $1,230,000. The total damage caused within Pensacola and the surrounding areas totaled to greater than $3,850,000. The hurricane was considered the worst in the city in 170 years. However, there was widespread praise by residents and newspapers for the Weather Bureau for tracking the hurricane and issuing storm warnings three days before the storm made landfall. A total of 35 people were killed in Pensacola.

=== Louisiana ===
In New Orleans, observations at the backwater of the Mississippi River indicated a storm surge of about 6 feet (1.8 m) in height on the morning of September 27. The highest sustained winds recorded during the storm in New Orleans were measured at 49 mph (79 km/h), while the minimum pressure recorded was 987 mbar (hPa; 29.15 inHg). In the town of Burrwood, a wharf was impacted by the hurricane's storm surge. In addition, local crops and railroads suffered severe damage. Lake Pontchartrain overflowed during the hurricane, with its waters 5 feet (1.5 m) above normal levels, flooding New Orleans. Telegraph wires were down in New Orleans after the hurricane, resulting in the loss of contact with the city. Chimneys were blown down in the city; and a resort along Lake Pontchartrain was underwater, and many houses were swept away near the hotel. Telephone service in New Orleans went down during the hurricane. It was reported that Fort St. Philip was flooded by boaters along the Mississippi River. The hurricane set a new 24-hour-record for rainfall at Colliston, where rainfall amounted to 4.55 inches (11.6 cm) accumulated during the hurricane.

=== Alabama ===
The lowest air pressure recorded in Mobile was 977 mbar (hPa; 28.84 inHg). At the highest point, the tide was measured at 9.87 feet (3.01 m), while the maximum sustained wind during the hurricane reached 94 mph (151 km/h). About twenty small buildings and houses were destroyed by the hurricane's winds. Most of the buildings in the city were either slightly or moderately damaged. Some shingles and roofs were blown off, while telegraph wires were down, along with other services that required electricity. In the Mobile River and Bay, a total of eleven steamships, seventeen barks and schooners, and 12 tugboats, had either been sunk or blown ashore. About 6.4 inches (16 cm) of rain was measured during the hurricane. In the areas surrounding Mobile, approximately half of all timber to be converted into turpentine was destroyed, and between 5 and 35 percent of other wood had been destroyed. The hurricane caused at least $1,650,000 in damage throughout Mobile. Telegraph wires were cut off from Mobile after the hurricane, resulting in the loss of communication with the city. It was estimated that five thousand houses were damaged in Mobile during the hurricane. The steamer Camp Carney was thrown onto St. Francis Street. Between Franscati Street and Three Mile Creek, all wharves were destroyed.

The Mann Lumber Company in Dawes had built a rail spur to connect their plant with the Mobile and Bay Shore Railway just days before the hurricane made landfall. The damage caused both the company and the railroad to go bankrupt. An oyster cannery near Bayou La Batre also suffered damage from the storm.

At the Christ Church Cathedral in Mobile, about $40,000 in damage was suffered, while at the St. Francis Baptist Church, damage totaled to about $10,000. Several steamers sank during the storm, including the J. P. Sehuh, Mary E. Staples, Mary S. Blees, Cama, Overton, Hattie B. Moore, City of Camden, and numerous others. One child was killed in Mobile. At Fort Morgan, many trees fell, roofs caved in, and windows were "smashed as though of tissue paper". Telegraph buildings in the city were flooded and moderately damaged. Five hotels suffered damage totaling to $21,000, while the Southern Supply Company, which was headquartered in the city, suffered $100,000 in damage. The fort's port suffered about $100,000 in damages. Six civilians were killed at the fort. Between Flomaton and Pensacola, railroad tracks of the Louisville and Nashville Railroad were torn up and blocked by trees. The section of railroad tracks between Georgian and Graceville was affected by similar damage. The railroad cancelled all services following the hurricane.

=== Mississippi ===
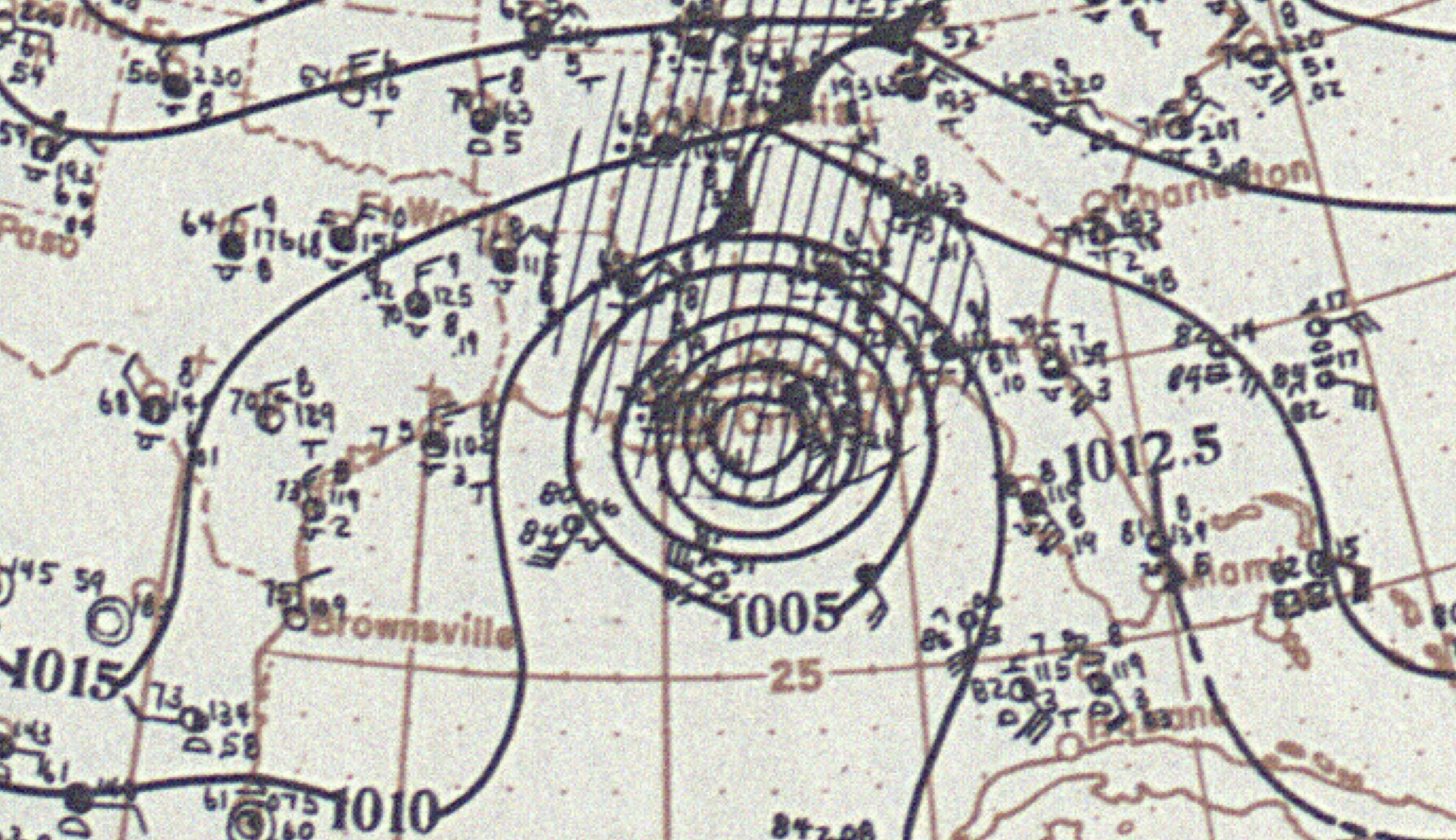
Surface weather analysis of the hurricane nearing landfall in Mississippi on September 27

In Scranton, the steamer Winona reported a minimum air pressure of 965 mbar (hPa; 28.50 inHg). Lieutenant B.L. Brockway speculated that Scranton was near the center of the hurricane at the time, due to the low pressure readings. At Biloxi, Moss Point, and Mississippi City, communications were not received. However, Moss Point reported that floodwaters were 5 feet (1.5 m) deep before communications were lost. In Macon, a hotel had been demolished during the hurricane, resulting in the deaths of two people. Jackson and Brookhaven suffered a loss of at least 300,000 cotton bales, amounting to $12,000,000 in damage. In Vicksburg and McComb, many buildings were damaged, along with damage to shipping in Vicksburg, with a broken dock. The railroads and trees of Monticello suffered moderate damage: the railroad tracks were covered in trees, and service was suspended east of the town. In Hattiesburg, many cabins were blown down during the storm. Damage in Hattiesburg amounted to $300,000. In McNeil, one person was killed by a tree that was blown down.

At the Horn Island lighthouse, the hurricane killed the lighthouse keeper and his wife and daughter. In addition to the death of the three at the lighthouse, it was noted that the schooner Daisy had been dismantled there, with one person killed. A person who was climbing a small tree was thrown away by the wind and drowned. Several people were trapped in their homes after a creek topped its banks. A warehouse and four other buildings were destroyed, while a bank's roof was blown off. A train near Brookhaven was washed away along the tracks of the Mississippi Central Railroad, resulting in the injury of five people. 25 schooners along the Mississippi coastline were completely destroyed. Two barks, the Nuremberg and Hercules were destroyed during the hurricane. Mandeline, owned by Norway, was filled with water, while Sigrav suffered severe damage, completely torn apart. A boat known as the Florine was washed ashore. A total of 78 fatalities occurred.

== See also ==
- List of Florida hurricanes (1900–1949)
