= Columbus and Western Railway =

Historic railroad in Georgia, United States

The Columbus and Western Railway (C&W) is a historic railroad that operated in Georgia, United States.

Organized in 1880, the C&W was founded to connect Columbus, Georgia, to Birmingham, Alabama. The same year, the C&W started by purchasing the Savannah and Memphis Railroad, which ran 66 miles (106 km) between Opelika and Goodwater, Alabama. Two years later, it purchased a 55-mile (89 km) branch of the Western Railroad of Alabama between Columbus and Opelika. In 1888, the C&W constructed the final leg of the line from Goodwater to Birmingham and later that year merged into the Savannah and Western Railroad.
