= Rousseau's Opelika Raid =

Battle of the American Civil War

- Part of the American Civil War
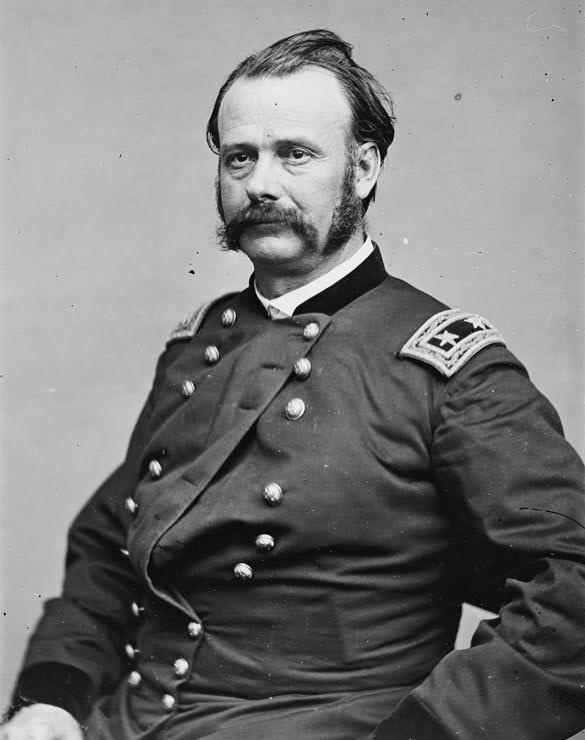
- Lovell Rousseau
Date	July 10–22, 1864 (1 week and 5 days)
Location	Opelika, Alabama
Result	Union victory

Belligerents
United States (Union)	(Confederate States of America) CSA (Confederacy)

Commanders and leaders
Lovell Rousseau	James Holt Clanton

Strength
2,700, 2 guns	300

Casualties and losses
50 men, 1 gun	62 men, 30 miles of railroad infrastructure

Rousseau's Opelika Raid (July 10–22, 1864) saw 2,700 Union cavalry led by Major General Lovell Rousseau raid deep into Alabama in the Atlanta campaign during the American Civil War. The successful raid began at Decatur, Alabama, and was only opposed by minimal forces of the Confederate States Army. The Union raiders rode south-southeast across the state destroying Confederate supplies and public property. They wrecked as much as 30 mi (48.3 km) of the Montgomery and West Point Railroad near Opelika, Alabama. The Union cavalry then turned northeast and joined the army of Major General William Tecumseh Sherman near Marietta, Georgia, while sustaining few casualties.

== Background ==
In 1864, the city of Atlanta was an obvious target for the Union Army in the Western Theater of the American Civil War. Atlanta was the hub for four railroads that stitched together the remaining territory of the Confederate States of America. Going north to Union-held Chattanooga, Tennessee, was the Western and Atlantic Railroad, going east to Augusta, Georgia, was the Georgia Railroad, going south was the Macon and Western Railroad with connections to Savannah, Georgia, and going west was the Atlanta and West Point Railroad. The last-named line connected to Montgomery, Alabama, via the Montgomery and West Point Railroad. From Montgomery there were steamboat connections with Selma and Mobile, Alabama. Atlanta itself was a center for manufacturing weapons and other military supplies, as well as warehouses for storing the materials. Confederate President Jefferson Davis knew that holding Atlanta was crucial because it was a transit point for supplies going to the army of General Robert E. Lee in the Eastern Theater.

On April 4, 1864, the General-in-chief of the Union Army, Lieutenant General Ulysses S. Grant ordered Sherman, "to move against Johnston's army, to break it up, and to get into the interior of the enemy's country as far as you can, inflicting all the damage you can against their war resources". Sherman chose Atlanta as his primary geographic objective. On April 10, he replied to Grant that he first planned to drive General Joseph E. Johnston's Confederate army south of the Chattahoochie River by maneuver. Then Sherman would use cavalry to cut the railroad between Atlanta and Montgomery. He also planned to sever Atlanta's communications to the east. By July 4, 1864, Sherman had driven Johnston back to the Chattahoochie.

In late June, according to Albert E. Castel or on July 7, according to Brett J. Derbes, Sherman ordered Rousseau to assemble 2,500 cavalry including 1,000 armed with 7-shot Spencer repeating rifles, two Parrott rifles, and supplies. Rousseau was directed to start at Decatur and ride south via Blountsville and Ashville, before destroying the bridge at Ten Islands. After crossing the Tallapoosa River, Rousseau was instructed to move either through Talladega or Oxford before wrecking the Montgomery and West Point Railroad between Tuskegee and Opelika. Demolishing the railroad involved the soldiers lifting the ties on one side of the track and then knocking apart the rails. The ties were stacked and set on fire and the iron rails laid across the flames. When the iron became red hot in the middle, the soldiers would twist the rails around telegraph poles or trees so they could not be used again. This created so-called "Sherman's Neckties". After wrecking the Montgomery and West Point, Rousseau was directed to join Sherman's army or to head for Pensacola, Florida.

== Raid ==
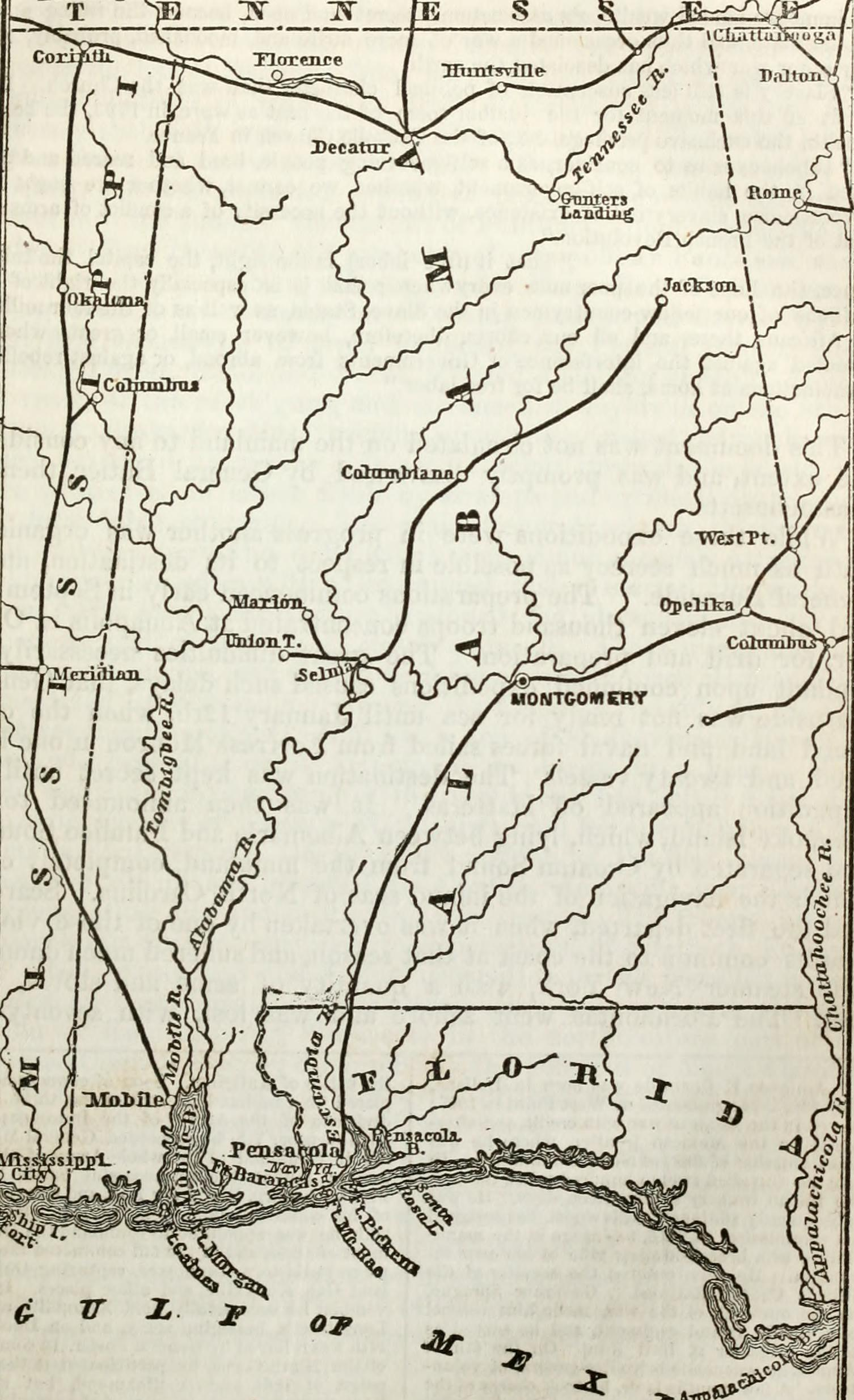
Map shows Alabama railroads in 1864. Rousseau's raiders rode southeast from Decatur to Opelika, crossing the Selma-Jackson railroad at Talladega (not shown).

Rousseau chose elements of the 5th Iowa Cavalry Regiment under Colonel Matthewson T. Patrick, 8th Indiana Cavalry under Colonel Thomas J. Harrison, 9th Ohio Cavalry under Colonel William D. Hamilton, and 2nd Kentucky Cavalry under Colonel Elijah S. Watts, and 4th Tennessee Cavalry under Major Meshack Stephens. A section of Parrott rifles under First Lieutenant Leonard Wightman detached from the 1st Michigan Light Artillery accompanied the raiders. Rousseau divided his 2,700 horsemen into two brigades led by Harrison and Hamilton. The column left Decatur at noon on July 10 and headed southeast, reaching Somerville that evening. Mark M. Boatner III stated that the raid began on July 9.

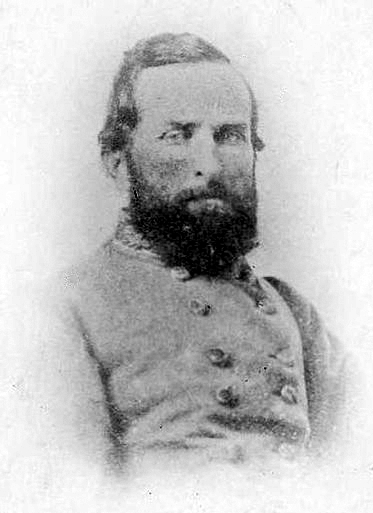
James H. Clanton

Sherman's forces won a bridgehead on the south bank of the Chattahoochie, so on the night of July 9 Johnston retreated to the outskirts of Atlanta. Sherman paused his campaign for a few days to build up his supplies and to allow time for Rousseau's raiders to reach the Montgomery and West Point Railroad. At this time, Sherman also directed Major General George Stoneman's cavalry division to launch a 4–5 day raid against the Atlanta and West Point, which was not successful in damaging the railroad.

Rousseau's column rode through Blountville, across Sand Mountain, through Oneonta, and across Strait Mountain. On July 12, the raiders caught up with an advance party of the 4th Tennessee at Ashville. Late on July 13, the column crossed the Coosa River at Ten Islands Ford and was joined by 200 more cavalrymen who crossed elsewhere in a ferry boat. There was an hour-long skirmish with a badly outnumbered force of Confederates led by Brigadier General James Holt Clanton. Rousseau's force lost only one man wounded while inflicting losses of 14 killed, 40 wounded, and 8 captured before the Confederates dispersed. After this encounter, Rousseau sent 300 unfit cavalrymen back to Guntersville and continued the raid with 2,400 cavalrymen. On July 14, the raiders reached Ohatchee where they destroyed the Cane Creek Ironworks and Janney Furnace. That day, Rousseau ordered one of the Parrott rifles destroyed because it was slowing down the column.

On July 15, Rousseau's command occupied Talladega where the Union cavalrymen wrecked the depot, two weapons factories, and railroad cars filled with army provisions. They also captured and paroled 143 wounded Confederate soldiers in the hospital. On July 16, the Union column rode southwest through Winterboro and southeast to Youngsville (now Alexander City). That evening, Rousseau's troops crossed the Tallapoosa River at Stowe's Ferry and a ford to the north. Continuing the march that night, they moved through Dadeville to reach the Montgomery and Westpoint Railroad at Loachapoka where they cut the telegraph wires. Rousseau let his soldiers rest until 10 pm on July 17 before ordering them to start ripping up track, burning ties, and twisting rails. (Note: Talladega was on the Alabama and Tennessee River Railroad, approximately midway between Columbiana and Jacksonville (Jackson) on the Alabama map.)

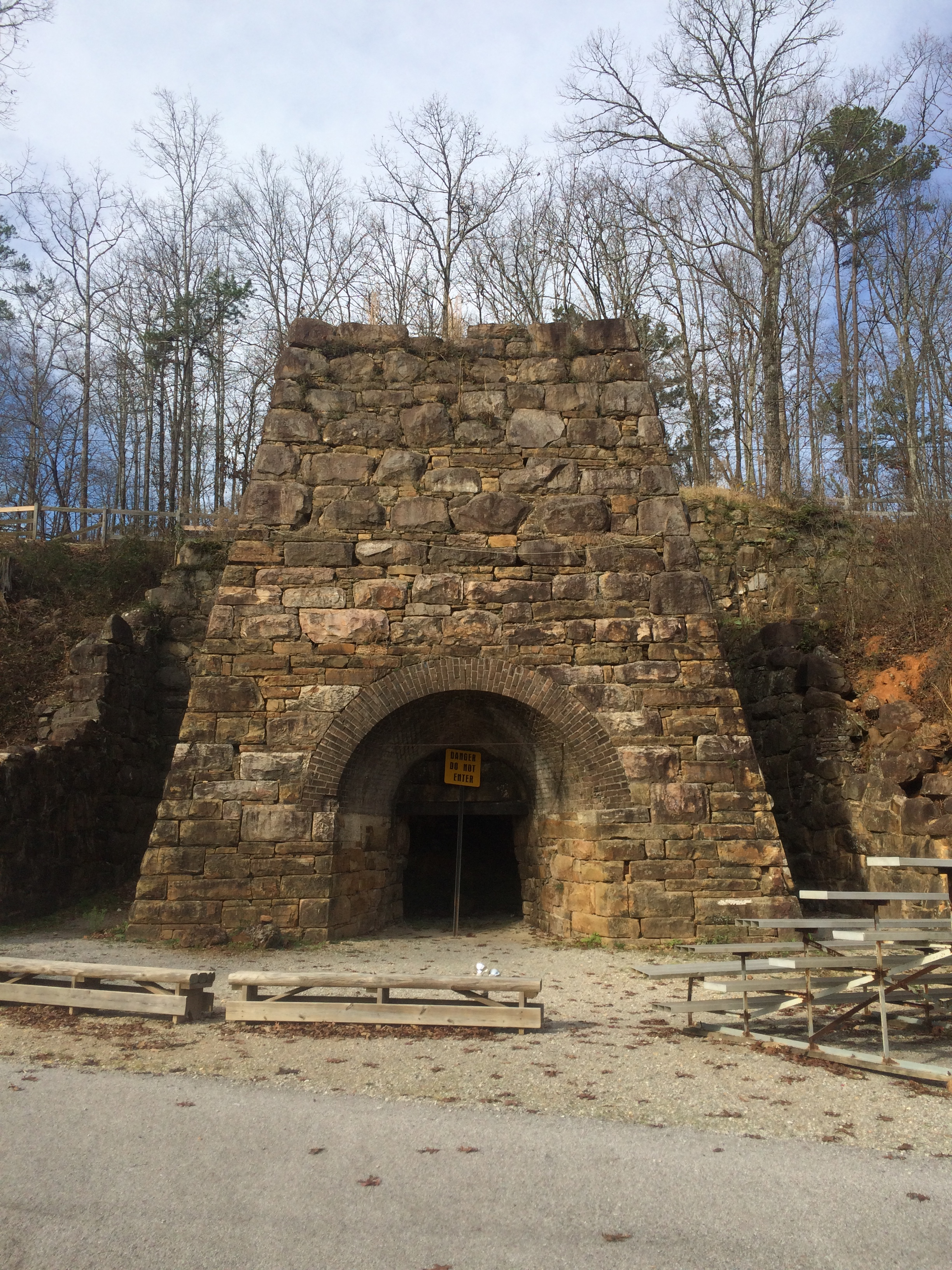
Janney Furnace

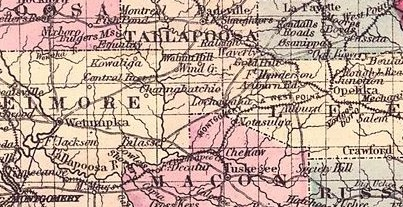
Map detail shows the Montgomery and West Point Railroad, including Chehaw, Notasulga, Loachapoka, Auburn, and Opelika.

On July 18, Rousseau split his forces into four groups. The 2nd Kentucky wrecked the railroad between Loachapoka and Notasulga. The 8th Indiana rode to Notasulga and demolished track south of there. The 4th Tennessee rode to Chehaw Station, where a spur line went south to Tuskegee, and ruined the railroad from there to the north. The fourth detachment under Hamilton marched to Auburn where they routed a handful of Confederates from the East Alabama Male College, burned supplies, and wrecked 3 mi (4.8 km) of railroad track to the north of town. Camp Watts, a Confederate barracks, supply center, and hospital 2 mi (3.2 km) west of Notasulga was burned. At Montgomery, Governor Thomas H. Watts gathered a motley force of 300 Confederate soldiers, including 54 cadets from the University of Alabama and two cannons, and sent them east by railroad. This force clashed with the 5th Iowa at Chehaw Station. However, when the 8th Indiana appeared, armed with Spencer repeating rifles, the Confederates were forced to retreat. With some raiders forming a covering force, the rest of Rousseau's troopers continued destroying the railroad near Notasulga.

On the morning of July 19, Rousseau reorganized his force into three groups. The first group continued wrecking track near Notasulga, the second destroyed 2 mi (3.2 km) of track leading from Opelika toward Columbus, Georgia, and the third group smashed the switches and burned the depot at Opelika. At noon, the Union raiders rendezvoused 1 mi (1.6 km) north of Opelika before heading north to LaFayette to halt for the evening. On the same day, Brigadier General Thomas J. Wood, one of Sherman's division commanders reported that a captured Atlanta newspaper disclosed that Opelika was captured. Sherman was pleased because the news suggested that the raiders were successful. The Battle of Peachtree Creek was fought near Atlanta on July 20. Altogether, Rousseau's troopers spent 36 hours wrecking the railroad. Moving northeast, Rousseau's raiders crossed into Georgia and rode through Carrollton and Villa Rica before reaching Powder Springs on July 22. Both Boatner and Castel stated that Rousseau's raid ended at Marietta.

== Results ==
Rousseau reported losing only 50 killed or captured during the raid. Rousseau claimed to have destroyed 30 mi (48.3 km) of railroad, including stations, depots, trestle bridges, and other railroad infrastructure. The Union raiders also burned or spoiled enormous amounts of cotton, provisions, and military equipment. The Montgomery and West Point Railroad was rendered inoperable for almost a month. Rousseau's arrival at Marietta represented a reinforcement of 2,500 much-needed cavalry for Sherman's army. After the raid, the cavalrymen were assigned to Brigadier General Edward M. McCook's cavalry division in Sherman's army and Rousseau returned to his normal command, the District of Nashville, which he led from November 10, 1863 until July 3, 1865.
