= Cahaba, Marion and Greensboro Railroad =

American railroad company

Overview
- Locale: Alabama
- Dates of operation: 1856–1871
- Successor: The Selma, Marion and Memphis Railroad Company (of Alabama); East Tennessee, Virginia and Georgia Railroad Company

Technical
- Track gauge: 4 ft 8 1/2 in (1,435 mm) standard gauge
- Previous gauge: 5 ft (1,524 mm), civil war era

Cahaba, Marion and Greensboro Railroad Company was incorporated under the act of Alabama on February 9, 1850, as The Marion and Alabama River Transportation Company.

On February 2, 1854, the name of the company was changed to The Marion Railroad Company. On February 6, 1858, the name of the company was changed to Marion and Cahaba Railroad Company. On February 2, 1860, the name of the company was changed to Cahaba, Marion and Greensboro Railroad Company.

In 1856, the company completed construction of 13 miles (21 km) of railroad line between Marion, Alabama, and a connection with The Selma and Meridian Railroad Company line at Marion Junction, Alabama.

On December 31, 1868, Cahaba, Marion and Greensboro Railroad Company bought the Northwestern Rail Road Company of Alabama, which had been incorporated under act of Alabama on February 20, 1854. The Northwestern Rail Road Company of Alabama built 11 miles (18 km) of railroad line between Uniontown, Alabama, and Newbern, Alabama, in 1863 and 1864. (Note: The name of the town is spelled "Newberne" in the ICC report.) The property was operated from the time of its construction until the time of its sale by The Selma and Meridian Railroad Company. Upon purchase of this line, Cahaba, Marion and Greensboro Railroad Company abandoned the mileage and took up the rails.

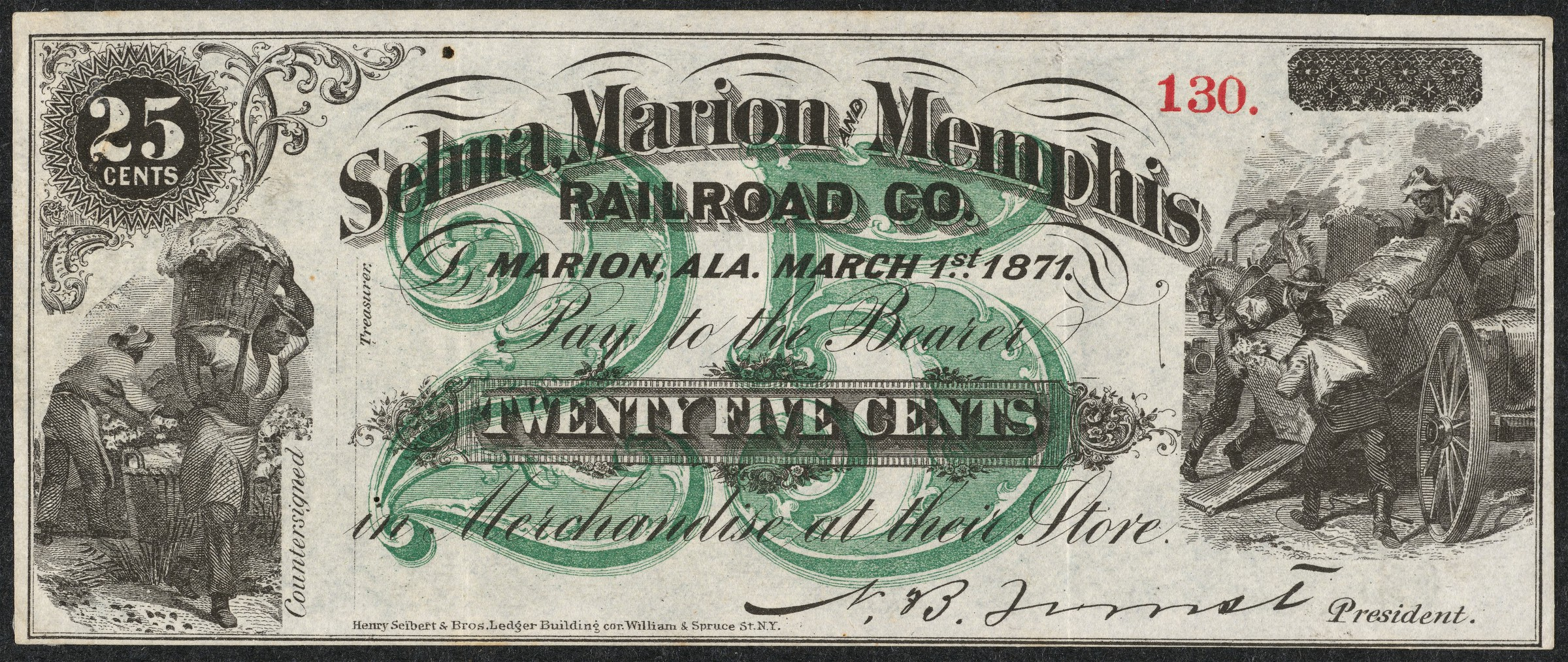
25 cent bill issued by the Selma, Marion, and Memphis Railroad Company in 1871

On December 31, 1868, the name of the company was changed to The Selma, Marion and Memphis Railroad Company (of Alabama). On March 17, 1871, the company was consolidated with Selma, Marion and Memphis Company (of Mississippi and Tennessee) to form The Selma, Marion and Memphis Railroad Company. The Selma, Marion and Memphis Railroad Company was sold at foreclosure on August 12, 1878, and conveyed on December 24, 1878, to Selma and Greensboro Railroad Company, which had been incorporated on December 2, 1878. The name of the company was changed to Cincinnati, Selma and Mobile Railway Company on December 17, 1881.

The company was sold to East Tennessee, Virginia and Georgia Railroad Company on February 19, 1890.

The property eventually became part of Southern Railway Company on July 7, 1894, through its acquisition of the East Tennessee, Virginia and Georgia Railway Company.

== See also ==
- Confederate railroads in the American Civil War
