= Washington and Choctaw Railway =

The Washington and Choctaw Railway was a railroad company in southwestern Alabama, first based in Yellow Pine and later in Aquilla. Its main line ran from Yellow Pine through Aquilla to the Bolinger Station just north of Silas, with a length of about 31 miles. However, the line was in operation in its full length only from November 1916 to September 1919.

== History ==
In the early 20th century, a narrow gauge logging railroad was operated from Yellow Pine about three miles north. It connected to the main line of the Mobile and Ohio Railroad in Yellow Pine. In April 1904, the E. W. Gates Lumber Company was founded and they acquired the logging railroad and a sawmill at Yellow Pine. The new owner rebuilt the railroad to standard gauge and worked on northward extensions. The railroad was operated under the name Washington and Choctaw Railway, named for the two counties (Washington County and Choctaw County) it connected. The name became official on December 13, 1910, when the railroad company was formally incorporated. By December 1909, the trackage had already reached Red Creek, with a branch to Millry, where the line connected to the Tombigbee Valley Railroad, about 28.7 miles in total length. One pair of mixed trains was operated along the line daily, and it took 140 minutes to complete the journey one way. However, except for the December 1909 timetable that was published in Official Guides of the Railways from January 1910 to at least July 1911, there is no evidence for the branch to Millry. In one of the next published timetables, effective December 1911, the branch is not longer mentioned. Also the mileage and intermediate stations of the main line had changed. The line now extended from Yellow Pine to a place called Mathews, 21 miles in length.

In the annual report of 1911, the following properties were listed:

Yellow Pine to Mathews, Ala., 25.0 m.; Mathews – west, 5.0 m.; east, 6.0 m. – total, 36.0 miles. Second track, 2.0 miles. Gauge, 4 ft. 8½ in. Rail (steel), 35 to 65 lbs. History. – Chartered April, 1904, under the laws of Alabama. Road completed as above Nov. 15, 1910. Locomotives, 3. Cars – passenger, 1; freight (box, 4; flat, 3; other, 109), 116 – total cars, 117.

The length discrepancy between Poor's Manual and the published timetables (25 vs. 21 miles for the Yellow Pine–Mathews line) cannot be explained. Further extension, opened by April 1916, brought the main line to Fail with a length of 24 miles, served by one daily mixed train each way. The April 1916 timetable lists further stations to Bolinger with a total length of 31 miles, and notes that the section between Fail and Bolinger was under construction and would be ready by June 1, 1916. However, the extension to Bolinger, where the main line connected to the Alabama, Tennessee and Northern Railroad (formerly Tombigbee Valley Railroad), was only opened on November 28, 1916. The mixed train ran daily over the full length of the line from this date. Train 1 left Yellow Pine at 7 a.m. and arrived in Bolinger at 11:50 a.m., taking almost five hours for the 31 mile trip. Train 2 departed Bolinger at 12:30 p.m. and reached Yellow Pine at 5 p.m. A timetable effective October 1917 still shows the full line in operation, with one single mixed train each way on the same times as in November 1916, but now running daily except Sundays.

The sawmill in Yellow Pine closed around 1918 and a new one was built in Aquilla (also called Cantwell for some time). Bolinger became its primary connection to the railroad network, being only 10.5 miles away. On September 22, 1919, the southern section of the line between Yellow Pine and Aquilla, about 20.5 miles in length, was abandoned. The mixed train between Bolinger and Aquilla ran until 1924 or 1925, when the line became freight-only. By December 1925, freight service became irregular. This service was maintained until 1927 when the sawmill in Aquilla shut down, and on June 9 of that year, permission was granted to abandon the line.
