= Mobile and Bay Shore Railway =

Railway line in Alabama, United States

- Geographic system map. Mobile and Western Railway/Dawes Branch shown in blue.

Overview
- Headquarters: Mobile, Alabama
- Dates of operation: 1899–1953

The Mobile and Bay Shore Railway was a branch line from Mobile, Alabama to Bayou La Batre, Alabama that was operated by the Mobile and Ohio Railroad and later the Gulf, Mobile and Ohio Railroad from September 10, 1899, to about 1953.

== History ==
In 1899, the branch was built by the Mobile and Ohio Railroad to connect Bayou La Batre by rail.

By 1932, the passenger service had been suspended, with only freight service running on the line.

The line was abandoned sometime in the 1940s.

=== Industries ===
==== Mobile and Western Railway ====
In 1906, the Robert K. Mann Lumber Company constructed a private line to connect their plant in Dawes to the Bay Shore line, named the Mobile and Western Railway. Only a few days after the line opened, the 1906 Mississippi hurricane destroyed much of the timber in the area. A fire destroyed the plant in June 1907, likely resulting in Mann Lumber and the Mobile and Western declaring bankruptcy soon thereafter. The Mobile and Ohio Railroad purchased the former line and restored it as the Dawes Branch September 13, 1911.

The Dawes Branch also served the L. L. Noble Packing Company, a fruit packer that sold Satsuma Oranges from Noble's orchards.

==== Alabama Canning Company ====
Another industry on the line was the Alabama Canning Company, who operated an oyster canning facility south of Bayou La Batre. The facility may have been open as early as 1897. The cannery was operational by 1906, when the same hurricane damaged the factory. The cannery had been purchased by the Dunbar, Lopez & DuKate Company, an oyster magnate in Biloxi, Mississippi by 1911. The oyster cannery likely shut down after a boiler explosion in August 1923. By 1924, the Mobile and Ohio submitted a request to the Interstate Commerce Commission to remove the line to Bayou La Batre, citing the failure of the cannery.
