= Alabama, Florida and Gulf Railroad =

Former shortline railroad in Alabama and Florida

The Alabama, Florida and Gulf Railroad was an American railroad which ran from Ardilla, Alabama to Greenwood, Florida. The line started as a logging railroad owned by the E.L. Marbury Lumber Company of Dothan, Alabama, running from Ardilla to Malone, Florida, where the company had a sawmill. Marbury Lumber incorporated the railroad as the Alabama, Florida and Southern Railroad in 1910. The railroad was sold in 1917 to W. S. Wilson, who changed its name to the Alabama, Florida and Gulf Railroad, and extended the track from Malone to Greenwood. The railroad was placed in receivership in 1924 and sold after foreclosure to the Bank of Dothan. The bank was in turn placed in receivership. The railroad was sold for $10,000 in 1936, and the name was changed again to the Alabama and Florida Railroad. The primary motive power left on the railroad was a diesel railbus. The railroad ceased operation in 1941 and the equipment was sold for scrap.
