= Chattanooga Southern Railway =

- The Pigeon Mountain Route

Overview
- Locale: Tennessee and Alabama, United States
- Dates of operation: 1887–
- Successor: Tennessee, Alabama and Georgia Railway

Technical
- Length: 93 miles (150 km)

The Chattanooga Southern Railway was founded in 1887 and began operations in 1891. It ran about 93 miles (150 km) of track between Chattanooga, Tennessee, and Gadsden, Alabama, hauling mainly iron, timber, and coal from the Lookout Mountain area. The railroad's nickname, The Pigeon Mountain Route, came from several miles of track that ran along the base of Pigeon Mountain. In 1896 the railroad ran into financial trouble and was reorganized as the Chattanooga Southern Railroad. The company operated under that name for about 15 years at which time it was again reorganized and began operating as the Tennessee, Alabama and Georgia Railway.
