= Alabama Central Railroad =

Railroad in Alabama

Overview
- Locale: Alabama, Mississippi
- Dates of operation: 1871–1881
- Predecessor: The Selma and Meridian Railroad Company
- Successor: East Tennessee, Virginia and Georgia Railroad Company then East Tennessee, Virginia and Georgia Railway Company

Technical
- Track gauge: 4 ft 8 1/2 in (1,435 mm)

The Alabama Central Railroad Company was incorporated under the general laws of Alabama on June 22, 1871, by certificate of incorporation dated June 21, 1871.

The Alabama Central Railroad Company acquired 77.3 miles (124.4 km) of single-track, standard gauge steam railroad line between Selma, Alabama and York, Alabama from the purchasers of The Selma and Meridian Rail Road Company at the foreclosure sale of the Selma and Meridian Railroad company's assets on May 1, 1871. This line had been constructed between the years 1852 and 1864 by The Alabama and Mississippi Rivers Rail Road Company, the Selma and Meridian Railroad's name until November 29, 1864.

The Alabama Central Railroad Company constructed 13.77 miles (22.16 km) of single-track, standard gauge steam railroad line between York, Alabama and Lauderdale, Mississippi in 1878. From its connection at Lauderdale, The Alabama Central Railroad operated about 18 miles (29 km) of line between Lauderdale and Meridian, Mississippi under a trackage rights agreement with the Mobile and Ohio Railroad Company.

The Alabama Central Railroad Company conveyed its property rights and franchises to the East Tennessee, Virginia and Georgia Railroad Company by deed on June 15, 1881.

The property eventually became part of Southern Railway Company on July 7, 1894, through Southern Railway's acquisition of a later successor company of the East Tennessee, Virginia and Georgia Railroad Company, namely the East Tennessee, Virginia and Georgia Railway Company.

== See also ==
- East Tennessee, Virginia and Georgia Railroad Company
