= Operating subsidiary =

Subsidiary of a corporation

An operating subsidiary is a subsidiary of a corporation through which the parent company (which may or may not be a holding company) indirectly conducts some portion of its business. Usually, an operating subsidiary can be distinguished in that even if its board of directors and officers overlap with those of other entities in the same corporate group, it has at least some officers and employees who conduct business operations primarily on behalf of the subsidiary alone (that is, they work directly for the subsidiary). The term carries slightly different meanings depending upon the specific context and industry.

A non-operating subsidiary, in contrast, is a subsidiary that exists on paper, but does not have any assets or employees of its own and therefore cannot function independently as a going business concern. Thus, its only actual business "operations" may consist of its officers entering into contracts with other corporate entities (which may or may not be within the same corporate group) to borrow their assets or employees.

== Examples ==
Multinational corporations often conduct business in many countries (including their own home country) through operating subsidiaries established for particular countries. As long as all legal formalities are strictly observed (to preclude piercing the corporate veil), this will limit the parent's exposure to a local legal system (liability, tax, etc.), since from a domestic perspective, the parent is merely a majority shareholder of a local corporation's stock.

In the U.S. banking industry, the term refers to a subsidiary of a bank through which the bank chooses to indirectly conduct some part of its banking business (or related businesses like insurance). To prevent banks from concealing their true structure or strength from regulators, they are required to give public notice of certain transactions with certain operating subsidiaries.

In the U.S. railroad industry, the term refers to a company that is a subsidiary but operates with its own identity and rolling stock. In contrast, a non-operating subsidiary would exist on paper only, but for operating purposes would use the identity and rolling stock of the parent company.
