= Tennessee, Alabama and Georgia Railway =

Railway line in the United States

Overview
- Headquarters: Chattanooga, Tennessee
- Reporting mark: TAG
- Locale: Eastern Tennessee, Northwest Georgia, and Northeast Alabama
- Dates of operation: 1911–1971

Technical
- Track gauge: 4 ft 8 1/2 in (1,435 mm) standard gauge

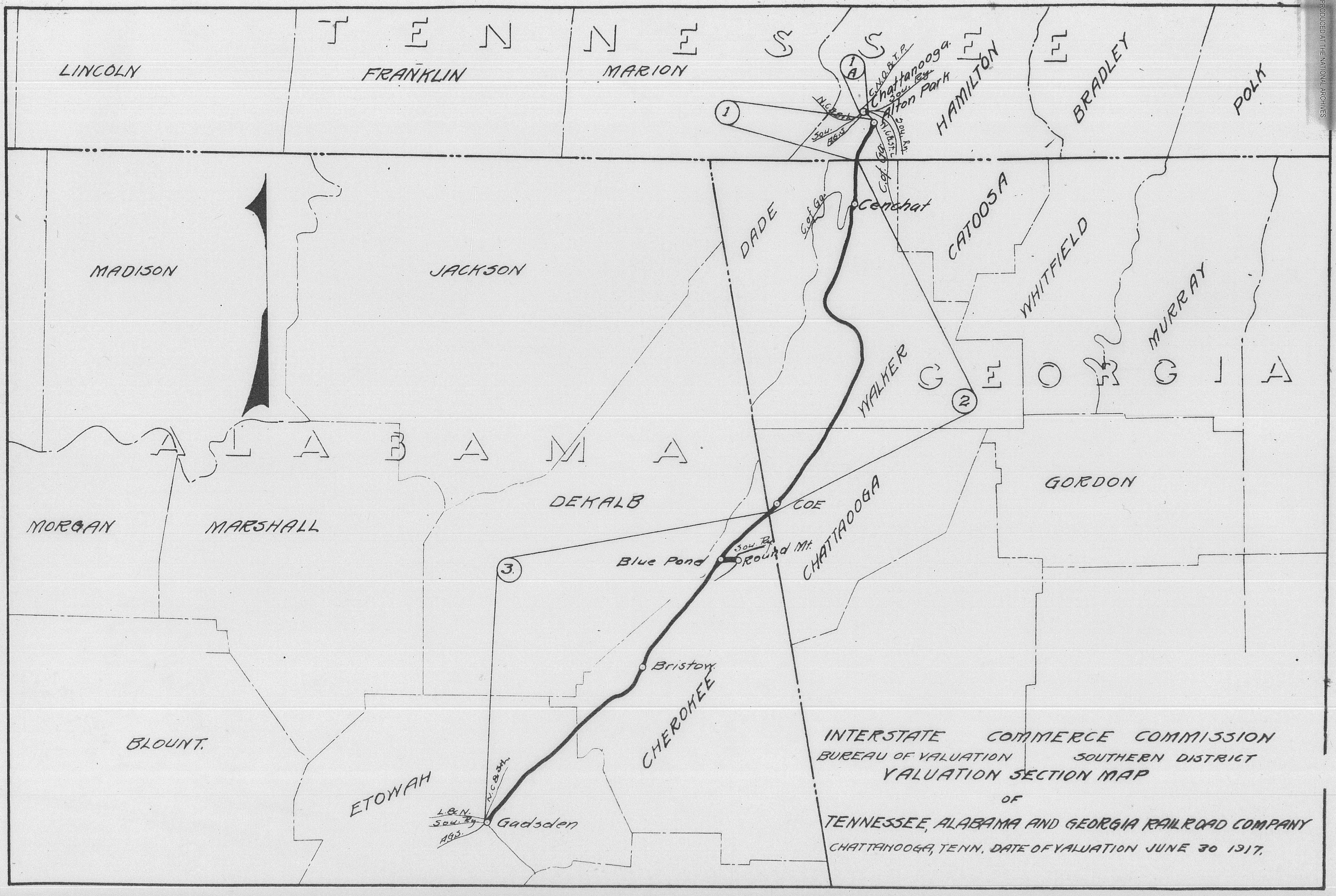
1917 map of the railroad

The Tennessee, Alabama and Georgia Railroad was created through a reorganization of the Chattanooga Southern Railway in 1911. A few years later, in 1922, the line's name was changed to the Tennessee, Alabama and Georgia Railway (reporting mark TAG) and was also known as the TAG Route. The TAG ran from Chattanooga, Tennessee, through northwest Georgia, and into Gadsden, Alabama. The trackage began at Milepost 1 in Alton Park (Chattanooga) and continued southwest to the southern terminus in Gadsden, some 91.7 miles (147.6 km) distant. In 1952, the railroad retired its last steam locomotive.

During the 1960s the railroad was owned by Mose and Garrison Siskin who owned the Siskin Steel Company in Chattanooga. They used the railroad to move steel products between Siskin Steel and Republic Steel in Gadsden. This made the TAG the only profitable short line railroad in the US during that period. The TAG was purchased by the Southern Railway in 1971. The northernmost 23 miles (37 km) ending at Kensington, Georgia were operated by the Chattooga and Chickamauga Railway until the Dow Chemical plant in Kensington closed in September 2009. Norfolk Southern began dismantling sections of the segment in March 2010.

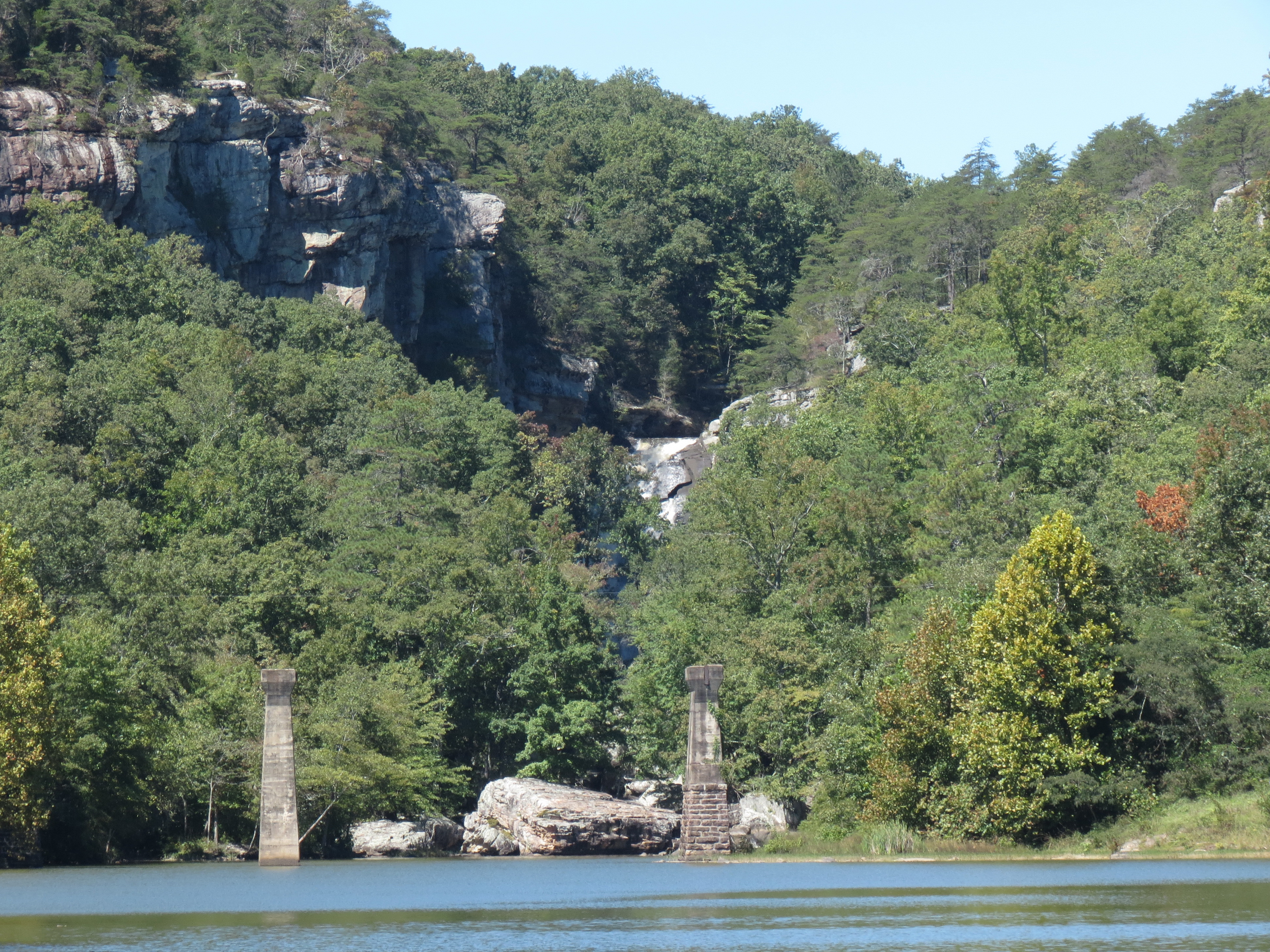
Piers of abandoned TAG Railroad Bridge at Yellow Creek Falls, Highway 273, East of Leesburg, Alabama

Nearly all remnants of the line south of Kensington point are gone, except for the Pigeon Mountain Tunnel just south of Kensington and the piers of the Yellow Creek Bridge near Leesburg, Alabama, on Lake Weiss. The steel bridge that crossed Yellow Creek now rests at the former location of the Gadsden terminal. The company still exists as a subsidiary of Norfolk Southern. Norfolk Southern has dedicated a Heritage unit to the TA&G, GE AC44C6M #4851 in November of 2024.
