= Georgia Pacific Railway =

The Georgia Pacific Railway was a railway company chartered on December 31, 1881, consolidating the Georgia Western Railroad and the Georgia Pacific Railroad Company of Alabama.

The Georgia Western Railroad was chartered by the Georgia Legislature in 1854, incorporated by Richard Peters, Lemuel Grant, and other prominent Atlantans. Its mission was to connect Atlanta via Villa Rica or Carrollton with destinations to the southwest in the direction of Alabama, specifically Jacksonville or Tuscaloosa. However, the Georgia Western was never built.

After consolidation, construction between 1882 and 1889 allowed the Georgia Pacific to connect Atlanta, Georgia, and Greenville, Mississippi. According to Georgia's Railroad History and Heritage, "the railroad opened between Atlanta and Birmingham in November, 1883; between Birmingham and Columbus, MS, in 1887; and between Columbus and the Mississippi River in 1889."

The Georgia Pacific was bought and absorbed by the Southern Railway in 1894. The Southern Railway was merged into the Norfolk Southern Railway in 1982. The portion of the line west of Columbus was split out (1923) and for a time was a part of the Illinois Central Gulf RR.
