= Savannah and Memphis Railroad =

Historic railroad that operated in Alabama

The Savannah and Memphis Railroad is a historic railroad that operated in Alabama.

It was founded as the Opelika and Talladega Railroad in 1854. Before any track was built, the railroad became the Opelika and Tuscumbia Railroad in 1861.

No track was built under the latter name either as the American Civil War broke out and interrupted plans. Once the fighting had stopped, the railroad was finally reorganized under the S&M name, but by 1874 had only built 55 miles of track from Opelika, Alabama, to Goodwater, Alabama, before finally going bankrupt. It was sold to the Columbus and Western Railway in 1880.
