= Alabama Warrior Railway =

Terminal railroad in Alabama

Overview
- Headquarters: Birmingham, Alabama
- Reporting mark: ABWR
- Locale: Birmingham, Alabama
- Dates of operation: 2009–present
- Predecessor: Jefferson Warrior Railroad

Technical
- Track gauge: 4 ft 8 1/2 in (1,435 mm)
- Length: 15 miles (24 km)

Other
- Website: watco.com/service/rail/alabama-warrior-railway-abwr/

The Alabama Warrior Railway (reporting mark ABWR) is a terminal railroad in Birmingham, Alabama, United States. The railroad operates within the confines of Walter Industries in North Birmingham. It began operations on August 7, 2009, and is owned and operated by Watco.

== History ==
The ABWR operates 15 miles (24 km) of railroad. Its route dates back to the Marylee Railroad, which was founded in 1895. The Jefferson Warrior Railroad had operated it since 1985. The ABWR began operating on August 7, 2009. The railroad hauls approximately 9,000 carloads annually and interchanges with CSX, Norfolk Southern and BNSF. On June 24, 2014, Caleb Bankston, a former contestant on reality series Survivor: Blood vs. Water and employee of the railroad, was killed by a derailment in Birmingham.
