= Montgomery and West Point Railroad =

- The railroad at its height in 1854, including the branch line to Columbus. Courtesy OpenHistoricalMap
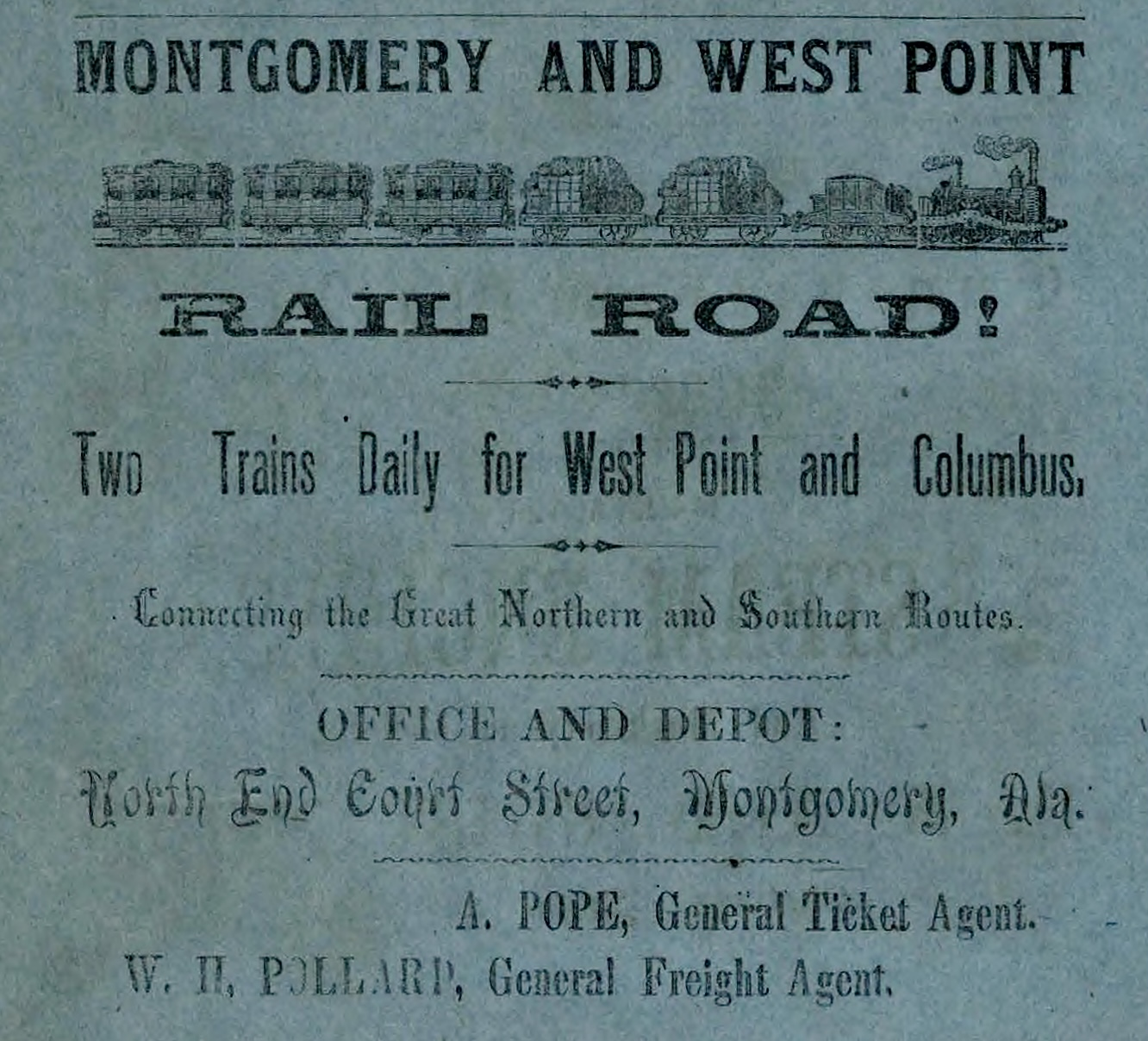
- Montgomery and West Point Railroad advertisement (1859)

Overview
- Locale: Alabama and Georgia
- Dates of operation: 1832–1870
- Successor: Western Railway of Alabama

Technical
- Track gauge: 4 ft 8 in (1,422 mm)

The Montgomery and West Point Railroad (M&WP) was an early 19th-century railroad in Alabama and Georgia. It played an important role during the American Civil War as a supply and transportation route for the Confederate Army, and, as such, was the target of a large raid by Union cavalry in the summer of 1864, called Rousseau 's Raid. In April of 1865 it was hit again after the fall of Montgomery by Wilson's Raid. The railroad played an important role in this business, and it became a symbol to industrialization in the United States. The railroads make it possible to supply large military forces that were needed in order to take over and conquer the Southern part of the United States. During the early 19th-century, turnpikes, canals, and railroads all brought people to the west and more products to the east. There was an effort in Americans during this time to build a railroad that would link Georgia to trade with the Tennessee and Ohio areas, and the M&WP was a starting point in helping to accomplish this goal.

== Background Information ==
The Montgomery Railroad had a charter granted on January 20, 1832, to build track from Montgomery, Alabama east to the Chattahoochee River at Columbus, Georgia. The instruction was for the track to begin in the city of Montgomery.

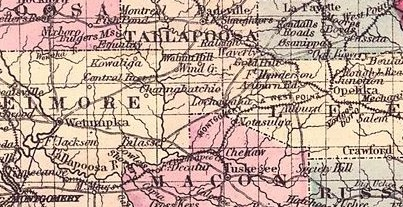
1876 map shows the Montgomery and West Point Railroad.

In 1833, the Georgia Railroad Company was chartered to businessmen for the sole objective of building a railroad from the west of the state into the inner part of the state of Georgia. In 1834, a second charter was gained with the route changing from Columbus to West Point, Georgia. When the second grant was issued, work was to be done with a short link of track that was laid to the northeast of Montgomery. The road was used and operated immediately after the first few tracks were made. Both horses and locomotives were used on this track. Neither the horses nor the locomotive itself was able to make a speed of more than 10 mph, and it was rare for them to reach even close to 10 mph. The road made some income, but it was not enough to be of consequence. In June 1840, the road earned $500. In June 1841, the same road earned $1800. This road was determined from where it began, and promoters believed that this was a great start to making a connection directly with the Atlantic coast. Even though this railroad had many successes quickly, the rivers were strong competitors. It costs a lot of money and time to build a railroad in comparison to building a canal.

The citizens far away were going to subscribe $400,000 in good faith, but later realized that there was a possibility that some of the other towns in Alabama would profit too by the connections of the road. Their subscriptions were not paid as a result of this. The overall standing of this railroad during this early period was odd. There were numerous and disastrous problems that arose throughout the time this was built. On December 3, 1838, Governor Arthur P. Bagby committed an act that was rash of including his administrative address to the Alabama legislature. There was an arrangement made between the Montgomery and West Point Railroad company and the Montgomery Branch Bank. This arrangement was that the bank had control over all the funds of the railroad. This arrangement was warranted by the charter of the railroad company. The company had to go through a "panic time" in 1837, and through the immediate years following. The subscriptions were reduced to $300,000 and an additional $300,000 worth of stock was sold and the total amount of subscription was increased to $600,000. The legislature was approached for a loan during this point, but before the state could invest, it was necessary for the company to mortgage its property of $1,600,000 worth, as well as the personal property of the stockholders as security.

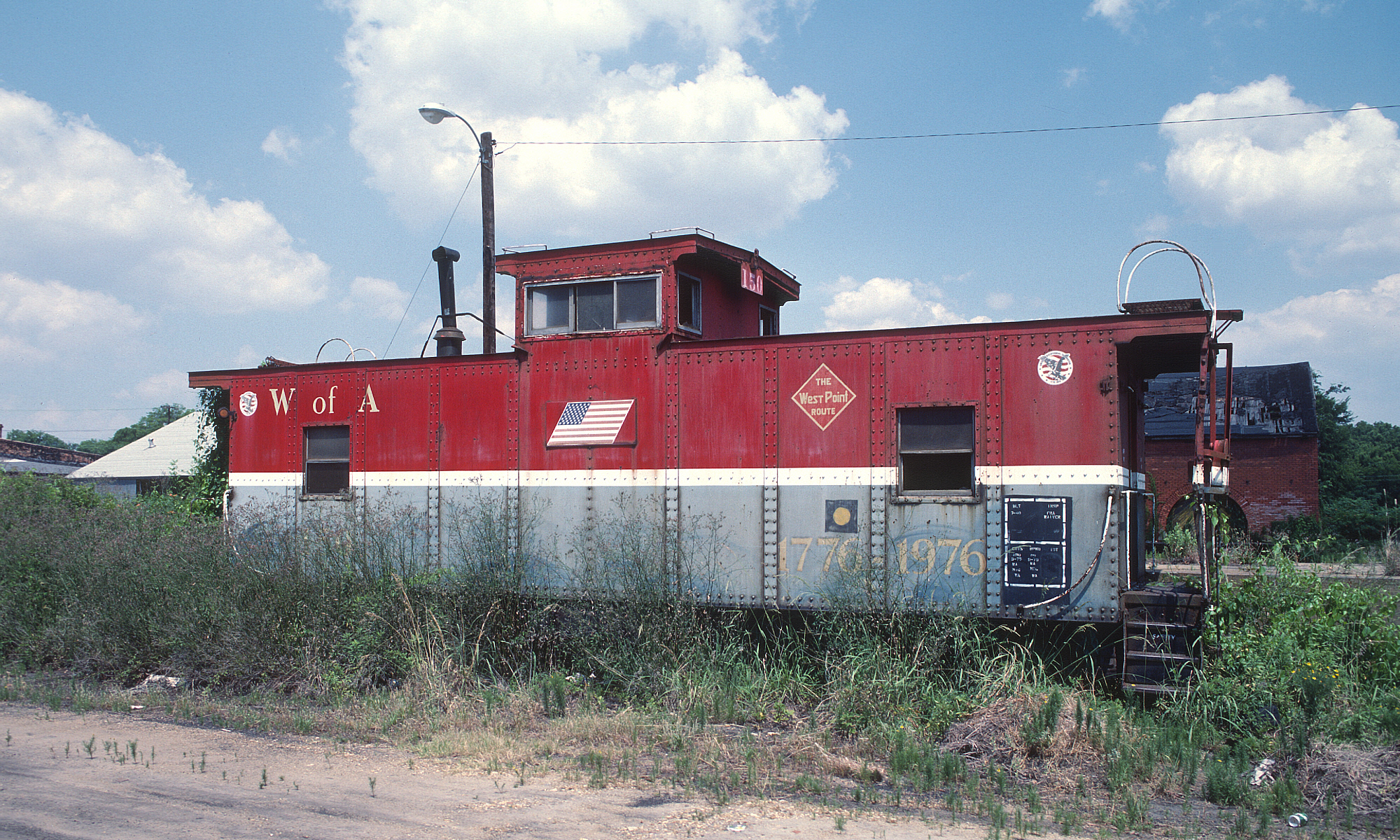
This is an image of what the Montgomery and West Point Railroad became later on.

The railroad had not reached Franklin, Alabama, just 32.4 miles (52.1 km) east of Montgomery until 1840. The railroad was sold under foreclosure on July 9, 1842, due to more financial troubles. It was later reorganized as the Montgomery and West Point Railroad on February 13, 1843. The railroad was completed to West Point on April 28, 1851. Three years later the Atlanta and West Point Railroad was completed, connecting Montgomery to East coast markets. In May 1851, the M&WP Railroad was completed and was daily operated by July 1, 1852. This railroad company profited to US$130,000.80. The state legislature threatened the success of this company and put the collections of the fund under close observation. The funds made from the rail were to be secured by the president and board of directors of the railway company. The president and his board had to guarantee that the road would not be put in operation anytime later than January 1, 1849. The M&WP then built a branch line from the main line Opelika, Alabama, to Columbus, which was constructed in the years of 1852–1856. It soon began operating when it was finished in 1856.

During the Civil War (1861–1865), the railroad was the target of Rousseau's Opelika Raid. In July 1864, 2,500 Union cavalry troops under the command of Lovell Rousseau started from Decatur, Alabama. Rousseau's force managed to take and burn a large quantity of supplies at Opelika. It destroyed 30 mi (48 km) of track, burned out the railroad stations and warehouses at Montgomery and West Point, by July 17.

In April 1865, a far more destructive raid, Wilson's Raid, wrecked all of the remaining rolling stock of the railroad. After the war was over, the railroad was repaired and reopened for use. The M&WP was later on merged into the Western Railway of Alabama in 1870.

== Main Purpose ==
The Montgomery and West Point Railroad was built because a rail line was needed from Alabama east to Chattahoochee River. This was a starting point in connected different states in the South of the United States of America. The businessmen in Montgomery wanted a fair trade in other parts of the state, and even in other states close by. In order to create a system where it would be easy for them to do business, a railroad was an ideal idea.

This railroad was mainly used during the Civil War in order to help transport military forces and other materials or supplies required to conquer the South. However, as railroads became more developed over the years, they became an efficient way of people transporting from one place to another. It formed a connection between the northeastern and southeastern sections of the United States and also played an important role.
