= Western Railway of Alabama =

American railroad

- Western Railway of Alabama in 1870. Courtesy OpenHistoricalMap

Overview
- Headquarters: Montgomery, Alabama
- Founders: Charles Pollard
- Dates of operation: 1870–~1980
- Successor: Seaboard System Railroad

The Western Railway of Alabama (WRA) also seen as "WofA" was created as the Western Rail Road of Alabama by the owners of the Montgomery & West Point Railroad (M&WP) with financing from the Central Rail Road and Banking Company of Georgia in 1870.

The line had long been envisioned by Charles T. Pollard, owner of the Montgomery & West Point Railroad and Alabama & Florida Railroad. On February 16, 1854, Pollard chartered the Western Rail Road Company of Alabama alongside Bolling Hall, Daniel Pratt, and John Whiting with the vision of creating a line linking the Montgomery & West Point Railroad with the Alabama & Mississippi Rivers Railroad.

However, the railroad between Montgomery and Selma remained in the planning stage for the next 15 years, with resources instead being directed to the Alabama & Mississippi Rivers Railroad and Alabama & Florida Railroad.

After the end of the Civil War, suffering from track repair costs and a downturn in profits, Pollard petitioned William Wadley, president of the Central Rail Road and Banking Company of Georgia, who invested the money needed to finally construct the route in 1870, linking West Point to Selma. Once built, the Montgomery & West Point Railroad was consolidated with the new route under the Western Rail Road of Alabama company.

Passenger service ceased January 7, 1970.

In the 1980s, the line and its sister railroads, the Atlanta & West Point Railroad and the Georgia Railroad, became part of the Family Lines System, along with the Seaboard Coast Line Railroad, the Louisville & Nashville Railroad and the Clinchfield Railroad. The lines were all later renamed Seaboard System Railroad, which in 1986 merged with the Chessie System to become CSX Transportation.

WRA was officially merged in CSX 12/03/2002
