= Alabama, Tennessee and Northern Railroad =

Former American short line railway

Overview
- Headquarters: Mobile, Alabama
- Reporting mark: ATN
- Locale: Alabama
- Dates of operation: 1897–1971
- Successor: St. Louis–San Francisco Railway

Technical
- Track gauge: 4 ft 8 1/2 in (1,435 mm)
- Length: 214 miles (344 km)

The Alabama, Tennessee and Northern Railroad (reporting mark ATN) was a short line railroad which operated in the state of Alabama. The company grew from an acquisition of an existing logging railroad in 1897, and merged with the St. Louis–San Francisco Railway (the "Frisco") in 1971. The company was also known as the "Port of Mobile Route."

== History ==
John Taylor Cochrane acquired the Seaboard Railroad, a 6-year-old 33-mile narrow-gauge logging line, in a foreclosure sale in 1897. Separately, Cochrane was approached by the citizens of Carrollton, Alabama to build a short-line connecting railroad for their town. It seems that in 1897, the Mobile and Ohio Railroad chose to route through Pickens County, Alabama by way of the town of Reform, Alabama—rather than the county seat of Carrollton—and the town needed to connect to Reform. Thus the Carrollton Short Line Railway was chartered, and built in 1900. Through mergers, acquisition of trackage rights, and the building and reconstruction of track, these two railroads eventually joined under the name of the Alabama, Tennessee and Northern Railroad, and the line was completed all the way from Reform to the port of Mobile, Alabama. By 1948, the Frisco had purchased controlling interest, and operated it as a separate entity until 1971, when the line was absorbed into the parent company.

In 1925, ATN reported 15 million ton-miles of revenue freight on 187 miles of line; in 1967, 543 million ton-miles on 214 route-miles. In 1950, under the auspices of the ATN, the Frisco began freight service to and from, and on Blakeley and Pinto Islands by way of two car floats across the Mobile River. The service was continued after the SLSF was merged into the Burlington Northern Railroad, until about 1994.
