= Selma and Meridian Railroad =

Overview
- Locale: Alabama, Mississippi
- Dates of operation: 1852–1871
- Successor: Alabama Central Railroad Company then East Tennessee, Virginia and Georgia Railroad Company then East Tennessee, Virginia and Georgia Railway Company

Technical
- Track gauge: 5 ft (1,524 mm)

The Selma and Meridian Rail Road Company was incorporated under special act of Alabama on February 7, 1850, as The Alabama and Mississippi Rivers Rail Road Company. On November 29, 1864, the name of the company was changed to The Selma and Meridian Rail Road Company.

On the date of the name change in 1864, the Selma and Meridian continued the operation of 77.3 miles (124.4 km) of railroad line between Selma, Alabama and York, Alabama. This line had been constructed between the years 1852 and 1864 under the company's previous name.

During the period from 1864 to 1868, The Selma and Meridian Rail Road Company leased and operated 11 miles (18 km) of railroad line between Uniontown, Alabama, a station on its line, and Newbern, Alabama. The lessor railroad, The Northwestern Rail Road Company of Alabama had built the line in 1863 and 1864. The lease ended with the Selma and Meridian Rail Road Company entering receivership in 1868.

During the period from 1864 to 1868, The Selma and Meridian Rail Road Company also leased and operated 27 miles (43 km) of railroad line between Meridian, Mississippi and York, Alabama. The lessor railroad, The North East and South West Alabama Railroad Company, had built the line between the years 1858 through 1860. The Meridian-York line had not been operated until it was connected to the Alabama and Mississippi Rivers Railroad Company line at York, Alabama in 1864. The connection was built a short time before the Alabama and Mississippi Rivers Railroad changed its name to The Selma and Meridian Rail Road and leased the line from the North East and South West Alabama Railroad.

The Selma and Meridian Rail Road Company was placed in receivership on March 19, 1868. The company's property, including the leased line between York, Alabama and Meridian, Mississippi, was operated by the receiver until May 1, 1871. The Selma and Meridian Rail Road Company was sold in foreclosure on May 1, 1871, and its 77.3 miles (124.4 km) railroad line between Selma, Alabama and York, Alabama was conveyed to The Alabama Central Railroad Company.

The property eventually became part of Southern Railway Company on July 7, 1894, through Southern Railway's acquisition of a later successor company of the Alabama Central Railroad Company, namely the East Tennessee, Virginia and Georgia Railway Company.

== See also ==
- Confederate railroads in the American Civil War
- Alabama Central Railroad Company
