= Jefferson Warrior Railroad =

The Jefferson Warrior Railroad (reporting mark JEFW) was a terminal railroad as reported by the AAR. The JEFW began in 1895 as the Marylee Railroad took its current name in 1985. It operated about 15 miles (24 km) of railroad in and around Birmingham, Alabama. The railroad was taken over by Watco and renamed the Alabama Warrior Railway in 2009.
