= Alabama and Mississippi Rivers Railroad =

Railroad in Alabama

Overview
- Locale: Alabama
- Dates of operation: 1852–1871
- Successor: Selma and Meridian Railroad Company then The Alabama Central Railroad Company then East Tennessee, Virginia and Georgia Railroad Company then East Tennessee, Virginia and Georgia Railway Company

Technical
- Track gauge: 4 ft 8 1/2 in (1,435 mm)
- Previous gauge: 5 ft (1,524 mm); American Civil War era

The Alabama and Mississippi Rivers Rail Road Company was incorporated under special act of Alabama on February 7, 1850.

The Alabama and Mississippi Rivers Rail Road Company constructed 77.3 miles (124.4 km) of railroad line between Selma, Alabama and York, Alabama during the years 1852 through 1864.

On November 29, 1864, the name of the company was changed to The Selma and Meridian Rail Road Company.

The property eventually became part of Southern Railway Company on July 7, 1894, through Southern's acquisition of a successor company, the East Tennessee, Virginia and Georgia Railway Company.

== See also ==
- Confederate railroads in the American Civil War
- Selma and Meridian Railroad
