= List of Mississippi railroads =

The following railroads operate in the U.S. state of Mississippi.

== Common freight carriers ==
- Alabama and Gulf Coast Railway (AGR)
- Alabama Southern Railroad (ABS)
- BNSF Railway (BNSF)
- Canadian National Railway (CN) through subsidiary Illinois Central Railroad (IC)
- Columbus and Greenville Railway (CAGY)
- Canadian Pacific Kansas City (CPKC)
- CSX Transportation (CSXT
- Golden Triangle Railroad (GTRA)
- Grenada Railway (GRYR)
- Luxapalila Valley Railroad (LXVR)
- M&B Railroad (MNBR)
- Meridian Southern Railway (MDS)
- Mississippi Central Railroad (MSCI)
- Mississippi Delta Railroad (MSDR)
- Mississippi Export Railroad (MSE)
- Mississippi Southern Railroad (MSR)
- Mississippian Railway (MSRW)
- Natchez Railway (NTZR)
- Norfolk Southern Railway (NS) including subsidiary Alabama Great Southern Railroad (AGS)
- Old Augusta Railroad (OAR)
- Port Bienville Railroad (PBVR)
- Ripley and New Albany Railroad (RNA)
- R.J. Corman Railroad/Tennessee Terminal (RJCK)
- Vicksburg Southern Railroad (VSOR)
- West Tennessee Railroad (WTNN)

== Passenger carriers ==
- Amtrak (AMTK)

== Defunct railroads ==
Name	Mark	System (Note: This is one or more of the Class I railroads that the railroad became part of, if any.)	From	To	Successor	Notes
Alabama Central Railroad		SOU	1871	1881	East Tennessee, Virginia and Georgia Railroad	
Alabama and Chattanooga Railroad		SOU	1868	1877	Alabama Great Southern Railroad	
Alabama and Mississippi Railroad	A&M		1902	1921	Mississippi and Alabama Railroad, Mississippi Export Railroad	
Alabama and Vicksburg Railway	A&V	IC	1889	1959	Illinois Central Railroad	
Arkansas City and Grenada Railroad		C&G	1872	1873	Greenville, Columbus and Birmingham Railroad	
Avera and Northeastern Railroad			1929	1933		
Batesville Southwestern Railroad	BSW	IC	1910	1930		
Bonhomie and Hattiesburg Southern Railroad			1923	1972	Illinois Central Gulf Railroad	
Boyle and Sunflower River Railroad		IC	1896	1900	Yazoo and Mississippi Valley Railroad	
Brookhaven and Pearl River Railway		IC	1904	1911	Mississippi Valley Company	
Burlington Northern Inc.	BN		1980	1981	Burlington Northern Railroad	
Burlington Northern Railroad	BN		1981	1996	Burlington Northern and Santa Fe Railway	
Canton, Aberdeen and Nashville Railroad		IC	1882	1953	Illinois Central Railroad	
Canton and Carthage Railroad	C&CA		1927	1960	N/A	
Canton and Jackson Railroad		IC	1841	1852	New Orleans, Jackson and Great Northern Railroad	
Canton, Kosciusko, Aberdeen and Tuscumbia Railroad		IC	1852	1853	New Orleans, Jackson and Great Northern Railroad	
Central Mississippi Railroad		IC	1877	1878	Chicago, St. Louis and New Orleans Railroad	
Chicago, St. Louis and New Orleans Railroad		IC	1878	1951	Illinois Central Railroad	
Chickawsaha and Jackson Railroad			1892	1914	Chicora and Northwestern Railway	
Chicora and Northwestern Railway			1914	1931	N/A	
Clinton and Vicksburg Railroad		IC	1831	1833	Commercial and Railroad Bank of Vicksburg	
Columbia, Lumberton and Gulf Railroad		IC	1894	1900	Gulf and Ship Island Railroad	
Columbia and Silver Creek Railroad	CLSL		1982	1988	Gloster Southern Railroad	
Columbus, Fayette and Decatur Railroad		C&G	1881	1881	Georgia Pacific Railway	
Columbus and Greenville Railroad	C&G	C&G, SOU	1920	1923	Columbus and Greenville Railway	
Columbus and Greenville Railway	C&G	C&G	1923	1972	Illinois Central Gulf Railroad	
Commercial and Railroad Bank of Vicksburg		IC	1833	1850	Vicksburg and Jackson Railroad	
Corinth and Counce Railroad	CCR		1958	1991	TennRail Corporation	
Cybur, Gulf and Northwestern Railroad			1914	1918		
Pearl River Valley Railroad	PRV		1917	2007	N/A	
DeKalb and Western Railroad	DK&W, DKW		1916	1949		
Delta Southern Railway		C&G	1904	1921	Itta Bena and Belzoni Railroad	
East Tennessee, Virginia and Georgia Railroad		SOU	1881	1886	East Tennessee, Virginia and Georgia Railway	
East Tennessee, Virginia and Georgia Railway		SOU	1886	1894	Southern Railway	
Ellisville and Laurel Railroad		GM&O	1902	1902	Mobile, Jackson and Kansas City Railroad	
Fernwood, Columbia and Gulf Railroad			1920	1972	Illinois Central Gulf Railroad	
Fernwood and Gulf Railroad			1906	1920	Fernwood, Columbia and Gulf Railroad	
Gainesville and Mississippi Railroad		GM&O	1852	1854	Mississippi, Gainesville and Tuscaloosa Railroad	
Georgia Pacific Railway		C&G, SOU	1881	1894	Southern Railway in Mississippi	
Grand Gulf and Port Gibson Railroad		IC	1852	1883	New Orleans, Baton Rouge, Vicksburg and Memphis Railroad	
Greenville, Columbus and Birmingham Railroad		C&G	1873	1881	Columbus, Fayette and Decatur Railroad	
Greenville, Deer Creek and Rolling Fork Railroad		C&G	1870	1880	Greenville, Columbus and Birmingham Railroad	
Gulf and Chicago Railroad		GM&O	1889	1903	Gulf and Chicago Railway	
Gulf and Chicago Railway		GM&O	1903	1909	New Orleans, Mobile and Chicago Railroad	
Gulf and Mississippi Railroad	GMSR		1985	1988	SouthRail Corporation	
Gulf, Mobile and Northern Railroad	GM&N	GM&O	1915	1940	Gulf, Mobile and Ohio Railroad	
Gulf, Mobile and Ohio Railroad	GM&O	GM&O	1938	1972	Illinois Central Gulf Railroad	
Gulf and Ship Island Railroad	G&SI	IC	1850	1945	Illinois Central Railroad	
Helm and Northwestern Railroad		IC	1904	1931	N/A	
Hiwannee and Tombigbee Railroad			1906	1912	N/A	
Illinois Central Railroad	IC	IC	1883	1972	Illinois Central Gulf Railroad	
Illinois Central Gulf Railroad	ICG		1972	1988	Illinois Central Railroad	
Itta Bena and Belzoni Railroad			1923	1928	N/A	
Jackson and Brandon Railroad and Bridge Company		IC	1841	1852	Southern Railroad	
Jackson and Brandon Railroad and Bridge Company		IC	1836	1838	Mississippi and Alabama Railroad	
Jackson and Eastern Railway		GM&O	1916	1929	Gulf, Mobile and Northern Railroad	
Kansas City, Memphis and Birmingham Railroad		SLSF	1886	1928	St. Louis – San Francisco Railway	
Kentwood and Eastern Railroad				1922	N/A	
Kentwood and Eastern Railway	K&E		1906	1922	N/A	
Kingston and Central Mississippi Railway		GM&O	1901	1902	Mobile, Jackson and Kansas City Railroad	
Kosciusko and Southeastern Railroad			1916	1931	N/A	
Leland Southwestern Railroad		IC	1906	1916	N/A	
Liberty–White Railroad			1902	1921	N/A	
Louisville and Nashville Railroad	L&N	L&N	1880	1983	Seaboard System Railroad	
Louisville, New Orleans and Texas Railway		IC	1884	1892	Yazoo and Mississippi Valley Railroad	
Memphis, Birmingham and Atlantic Railroad		SLSF	1885	1887	Kansas City, Memphis and Birmingham Railroad	
Memphis and Charleston Railroad		SOU	1850	1898	Memphis and Charleston Railway	
Memphis and Charleston Railway		SOU	1898	2002	Norfolk Southern Railway	
Memphis, Holly Springs and Mobile Railroad		SLSF	1859	1867	Memphis, Holly Springs, Okolona and Selma Railroad	
Memphis, Holly Springs, Okolona and Selma Railroad		SLSF	1867	1870	Selma, Marion and Memphis Railroad	
Memphis, Holly Springs and Selma Railroad		SLSF	1881	1881	Memphis, Selma and Brunswick Railroad	
Memphis and New Orleans Railroad and Levee Company		IC	1882	1887	Louisville, New Orleans and Texas Railway	
Memphis, Selma and Brunswick Railroad		SLSF	1881	1885	Memphis, Birmingham and Atlantic Railroad	
Memphis and Vicksburg Railroad		IC	1870	1884	Louisville, New Orleans and Texas Railway	
Meridian and Bigbee Railroad	MBRR, MB		1952	1997	M&B Railroad	
Meridian and Bigbee River Railway			1917	1952	Meridian and Bigbee Railroad	
Meridian, Brookhaven and Natchez Railroad		IC	1891	1946	Illinois Central Railroad	
Meridian, Brookhaven and Natchez Railroad		IC	1882	1888	Illinois Central Railroad	
Meridian and Deep Water Railway			1911		Meridian and Bigbee River Railway	
Meridian and Memphis Railway	M&M	GM&O	1911	1929	Gulf, Mobile and Northern Railroad	
Meridian Terminal Company		GM&O/ IC/ SOU	1904	1958	New Orleans and Northeastern Railroad	
MidSouth Rail Corporation	MSRC		1986	1993	Kansas City Southern Railway	
Minter City Southern and Western Railroad		IC	1904	1932	N/A	
Mississippi and Alabama Railroad			1922	1950	N/A	
Mississippi and Alabama Railroad		IC	1905	1913	Chicago, St. Louis and New Orleans Railroad	
Mississippi and Alabama Railroad		IC	1836	1841	Jackson and Brandon Railroad and Bridge Company	
Mississippi Central Railroad	MSC	IC	1904	1967	Illinois Central Railroad	
Mississippi Central Railroad		IC	1852	1874	New Orleans, St. Louis and Chicago Railroad	
Mississippi Eastern Railway	ME		1903	1942	N/A	
Mississippi, Gainesville and Tuscaloosa Railroad		GM&O	1854	1870	Mobile and Ohio Railroad	
Mississippi and Schoona Valley Railroad			1925	1926	Mississippi and Skuna Valley Railroad	
Mississippi Southern Railroad			1922	1932	N/A	
Mississippi and Tennessee RailNet	MT		1998	2003	Mississippi Tennessee Railroad	
Mississippi Tennessee Railroad	MTNR		2003	2011	Ripley and New Albany Railroad	
Mississippi and Tennessee Railroad		IC	1852	1889	Chicago, St. Louis and New Orleans Railroad	
Mississippi Valley Company		IC	1872	1945	Illinois Central Railroad	
Mississippi Valley and Ship Island Railroad		IC	1873	1883	New Orleans, Baton Rouge, Vicksburg and Memphis Railroad	
Mississippi and Western Railroad			1917	1932	N/A	
Missouri Pacific Railroad	MP	MP	1965	1982	Illinois Central Gulf Railroad	
Mobile, Hattiesburg and Jackson Railroad		GM&O	1888	1890	Mobile, Jackson and Kansas City Railroad	
Mobile, Jackson and Kansas City Railroad		GM&O	1890	1909	New Orleans, Mobile and Chicago Railroad	
Mobile and Northwestern Railroad		IC	1870	1889	Louisville, New Orleans and Texas Railway, Mississippi Valley Company	
Mobile and Ohio Railroad		GM&O	1848	1940	Gulf, Mobile and Ohio Railroad	
Moss Point and Pascagoula Railroad			1894	1903	Pascagoula Street Railway and Power Company	
Nashville and Mississippi Delta Railroad		SOU	1890	1902	Southern Railway	
Natchez, Columbia and Mobile Railroad			1892	1933	N/A	
Natchez and Eastern Railway		IC	1906	1909	Mississippi Central Railroad	
Natchez and Jackson Railroad		IC	1870	1872	Natchez, Jackson and Columbus Railroad	
Natchez, Jackson and Columbus Railroad		IC	1872	1890	Louisville, New Orleans and Texas Railway	
Natchez and Southern Railway		MP	1902	1965	Missouri Pacific Railroad	
Natchez Trace Railroad	NTR		1982	1993	Mississippi Central Railroad	
New Orleans, Baton Rouge, Vicksburg and Memphis Railroad		IC	1882	1884	Louisville, New Orleans and Texas Railway	
New Orleans Great Northern Railroad	NOGN	GM&O	1905	1933	New Orleans Great Northern Railway	
New Orleans Great Northern Railway		GM&O	1933	1983	Illinois Central Gulf Railroad	
New Orleans, Jackson and Great Northern Railroad	NOJ&GN	IC	1852	1874	New Orleans, St. Louis and Chicago Railroad	
New Orleans, Jackson and Northern Railroad		IC	1877	1878	Chicago, St. Louis and New Orleans Railroad	
New Orleans, Mobile and Chattanooga Railroad		L&N	1867	1871	New Orleans, Mobile and Texas Railroad	
New Orleans, Mobile and Chicago Railroad		GM&O	1909	1915	Gulf, Mobile and Northern Railroad	
New Orleans, Mobile and Texas Railroad		L&N	1871	1881	Louisville and Nashville Railroad	
New Orleans and Northeastern Railroad	N&NE	SOU	1871	1969	Alabama Great Southern Railroad	
New Orleans and Northwestern Railway		MP	1884	1902	Natchez and Southern Railway	
New Orleans, St. Louis and Chicago Railroad		IC	1874	1877	Central Mississippi Railroad, New Orleans, Jackson and Northern Railroad	
North East and South West Alabama Railroad		SOU	1854	1868	Alabama and Chattanooga Railroad	
Oak Grove and Georgetown Railroad			1904	1927	N/A	
Okolona, Houston & Calhoun City Railway	O.H.&C.C.		1933	1939	N/A	
Pascagoula – Moss Point Northern Railroad			1912	1915	Alabama and Mississippi Railroad	
Pascagoula Northern Railroad			1909	1912	Pascagoula – Moss Point Northern Railroad	
Pearl and Leaf Rivers Railroad		IC	1897	1904	Mississippi Central Railroad	
Richmond and Danville Railroad		C&G, SOU	1889	1894	Southern Railway	
Ripley Railroad		GM&O	1871	1872	Ship Island, Ripley and Kentucky Railroad	
Rosedale and Mississippi Central Railroad		IC	1890	1898	Yazoo and Mississippi Valley Railroad	
St. Louis – San Francisco Railway	SLSF	SLSF	1916	1980	Burlington Northern Inc.	
St. Louis and San Francisco Railroad		SLSF	1903	1916	St. Louis – San Francisco Railway	
Sanoody Valley Railroad			1908	1915	DeKalb and Western Railroad	
Sardis and Delta Railroad			1900	1929	N/A	
Seaboard System Railroad	SBD		1983	1986	CSX Transportation	
Selma, Marion and Memphis Railroad		SLSF	1870	1881	Memphis, Holly Springs and Selma Railroad	
Ship Island, Ripley and Kentucky Railroad		GM&O	1872	1889	Gulf and Chicago Railroad	
Shubuta and Southwestern Railroad			1905	1922	N/A	
Southern Railroad		IC	1846	1867	Vicksburg and Meridian Railroad	
Southern Railway	SOU	SOU	1894	1990	Norfolk Southern Railway	
Southern Railway in Mississippi		C&G, SOU	1894	1920	Columbus and Greenville Railroad	
SouthRail Corporation	SR		1988	1993	Kansas City Southern Railway	
Sunflower and Eastern Railway		IC	1901	1930	N/A	
Tallahatta Railroad			1902	1919	N/A	
TennRail Corporation			1991	1993	Kansas City Southern Railway	
Vicksburg and Jackson Railroad		IC	1850	1857	Southern Railroad	
Vicksburg and Meridian Railroad		IC	1867	1889	Alabama and Vicksburg Railway	
Vicksburg, Pensacola and Ship Island Railroad		IC	1871	1873	Mississippi Valley and Ship Island Railroad	
West and East Railroad		IC	1873	1886	Yazoo and Mississippi Valley Railroad	
West Feliciana Railroad		IC	1831	1888	Louisville, New Orleans and Texas Railway	
Yazoo Delta Railway		IC	1895	1900	Yazoo and Mississippi Valley Railroad	
Yazoo and Mississippi Valley Railroad		IC	1882	1946	Illinois Central Railroad	

Private freight carriers

- Albertson Great Eastern Railroad
- Champion Lumber Company
- Epps and Northwestern Railroad
- Laurel and Northwestern Railroad
- Laurel and Tallahoma Western Railway

Electric

- Biloxi Electric Railway and Power Company
- Gulfport and Mississippi Coast Traction Company
- Hattiesburg Traction Company
- Jackson Railway and Light Company
- Jackson Light and Traction Company
- Meridian Light and Railway Company
- Meridian Street Railway and Power Company
- Pascagoula Street Railway and Power Company
- Southern Railway and Light Company
- Southern Light and Traction Company
- Vicksburg Railway and Light Company
- Vicksburg Light and Traction Company
- Vicksburg Traction Company

== See also ==
- Natchez and Hamburg Railroad

== General references ==
- Hilton, George W. (1990). American Narrow Gauge Railroads. Stanford, California: Stanford University Press. ISBN 0-8047-2369-9.
- Mississippi DOT railroad map (PDF)
- Mississippi Rails
