= Alabama and Gulf Coast Railway =

Railroad in Southern United States

Coordinates: 31.59304°N 87.41031°W

Alabama & Gulf Coast Railway

Overview
- Headquarters: Monroeville, Alabama
- Reporting mark: AGR
- Locale: Alabama, Florida and Mississippi
- Dates of operation: 1997–present
- Predecessor: Burlington Northern

Technical
- Track gauge: 4 ft 8 1/2 in (1,435 mm) standard gauge
- Length: 292 mi (470 km)

Other
- Website: gwrr.com/agr

The Alabama & Gulf Coast Railway (reporting mark AGR) is a Class II railroad in the United States, owned by Genesee & Wyoming. It operates 292 miles (470 km) of track from the Pensacola, Florida, export terminals, west of downtown, north to Columbus, Mississippi, with trackage rights along BNSF Railway to Amory, Mississippi. A branch uses trackage rights along Norfolk Southern from Kimbrough, Alabama, west and south to Mobile, Alabama, with separate trackage at the end of the line in Mobile.

== History ==
=== Predecessor lines ===
The current AGR is composed of numerous lines built during the late 19th and early 20th centuries, which were gradually consolidated into a system that was purchased by the St. Louis – San Francisco Railway (the Frisco) and remained under that railroad or its successor's control until 1997, when it was spun off into an independent company.

==== Pre-1922 ====
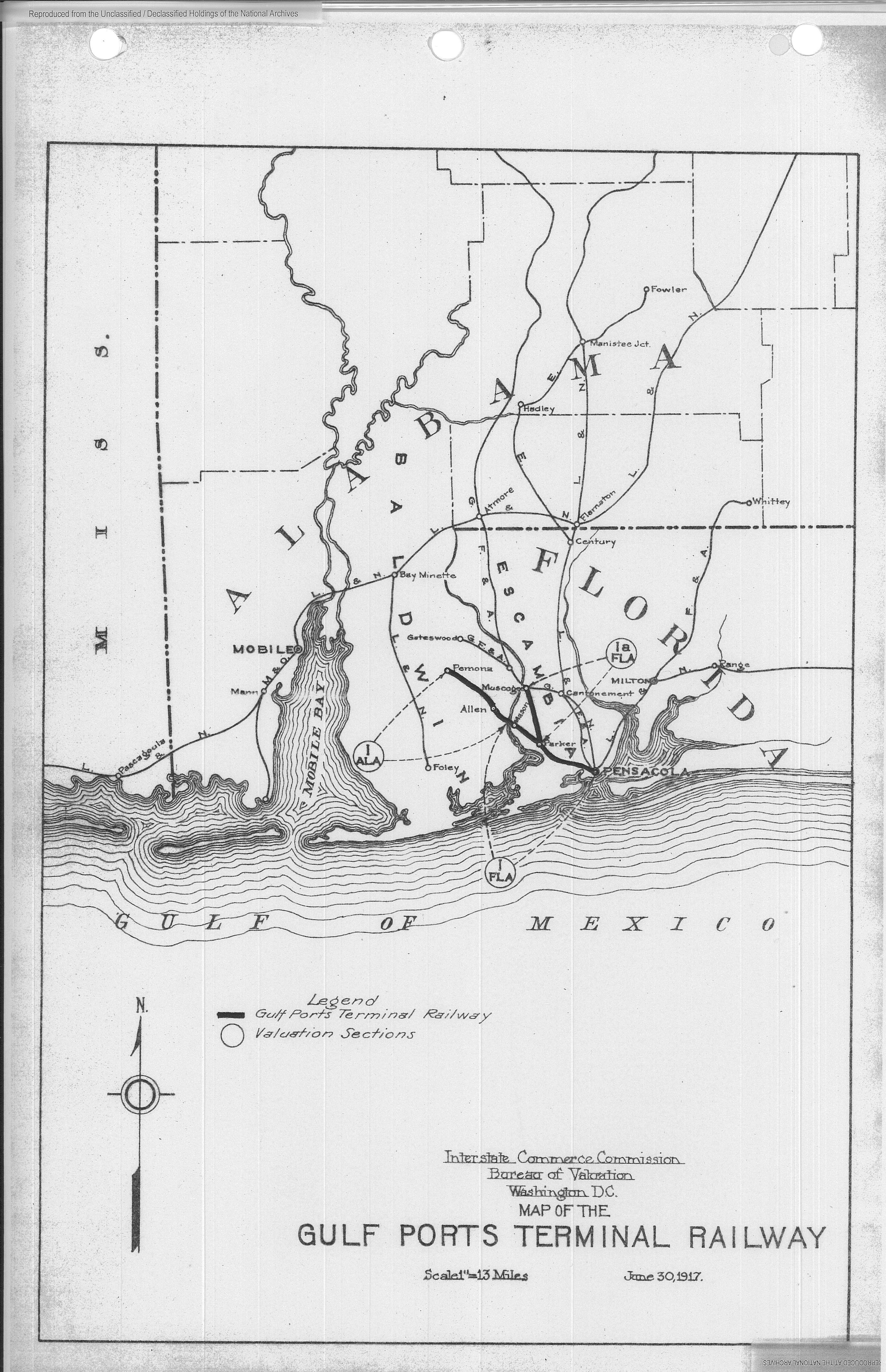
1917 map of the Gulf Ports Terminal Railway

The earliest ancestor of the AGR was the Pensacola and Mobile Railroad and Manufacturing Company, which in 1861 constructed 5 miles (8.0 km) of track between Muscogee, Florida, and Cantonment, Florida. The railroad was not rebuilt until 1877. In 1874, the Pensacola, Mobile & New Orleans Railroad company took control of the Pensacola and Perdido Railroad, which ran west from Pensacola about five miles to a lumber mill at Millview, Florida, on Perdido Bay. In 1892, the system merged with the Pensacola, Alabama and Tennessee Railroad, which connected the Millview and Muscogee branches. Shortly thereafter, the railroad was renamed the Gulf Ports Terminal Railway.

In 1910, the Gulf Ports Terminal Railway was acquired by Southern States Lumber, which operated 68 miles (109 km) of track to move lumber from forests in Baldwin County, Alabama, to its large mill at Muscogee, and on to the port of Pensacola for export. The combined system had a total length of around 80 miles (130 km).

In 1911, the railroad was acquired by the Gulf, Florida, and Alabama Railway. Soon after, construction of a line from Cantonment to Pensacola was begun, being completed in 1913. Almost immediately following the completion of this line, another, much longer line was begun, this one from Cantonment north via Atmore and Frisco City, Alabama, to an interchange with the Southern Railway at Kimbrough, Alabama. The line, including a large bridge over the Alabama River, was completed in 1915.

==== 1922–1997 ====
In 1922, the Gulf, Florida, and Alabama Railway was acquired by the Muscle Shoals, Birmingham and Pensacola Railroad (MSB&P), which only three years later was bought by the Frisco (St. Louis – San Francisco Railway). After the acquisition, the Frisco constructed a line from Aberdeen, Mississippi, to Kimbrough, connecting the former MSB&P with the rest of Frisco's system. This line was completed in 1928.

During the middle of the 20th century, the railroad operated as part of the Frisco, moving bulk products south to Pensacola for export and produce products north. Passenger service over the line continued until 1955, when the Sunnyland, operating between Pensacola and Kansas City, Missouri, via Amory, Mississippi, and Memphis, Tennessee, was discontinued.

In 1980, the Frisco was acquired by the Burlington Northern Railroad (BN), itself a product of a merger of several railroads in 1970. In 1995, the BN merged with the Atchison, Topeka and Santa Fe Railway to form the BNSF Railway.

=== Current railroad ===
In 1997, when BNSF spun off the route between Kimbrough and Pensacola, the Alabama & Gulf Coast was formed to take over operations. In 2003, BNSF sold additional trackage to the AGR: a line between Kimbrough and Columbus, Mississippi, as well as isolated trackage near Mobile, Alabama, formerly part of the Alabama, Tennessee and Northern Railroad. As part of this deal, the AGR gained trackage rights on BNSF between Columbus and Amory and on the Norfolk Southern Railway between Mobile and Kimbrough.

In 2002, the AGR, which had been formerly owned by States Rail, Inc., a short-line holding company, was acquired by RailAmerica. In late 2012, Genesee & Wyoming acquired the railroad as part of its acquisition of RailAmerica.

== Fleet ==
As of December 2020, the AGR fleet consisted of the following:

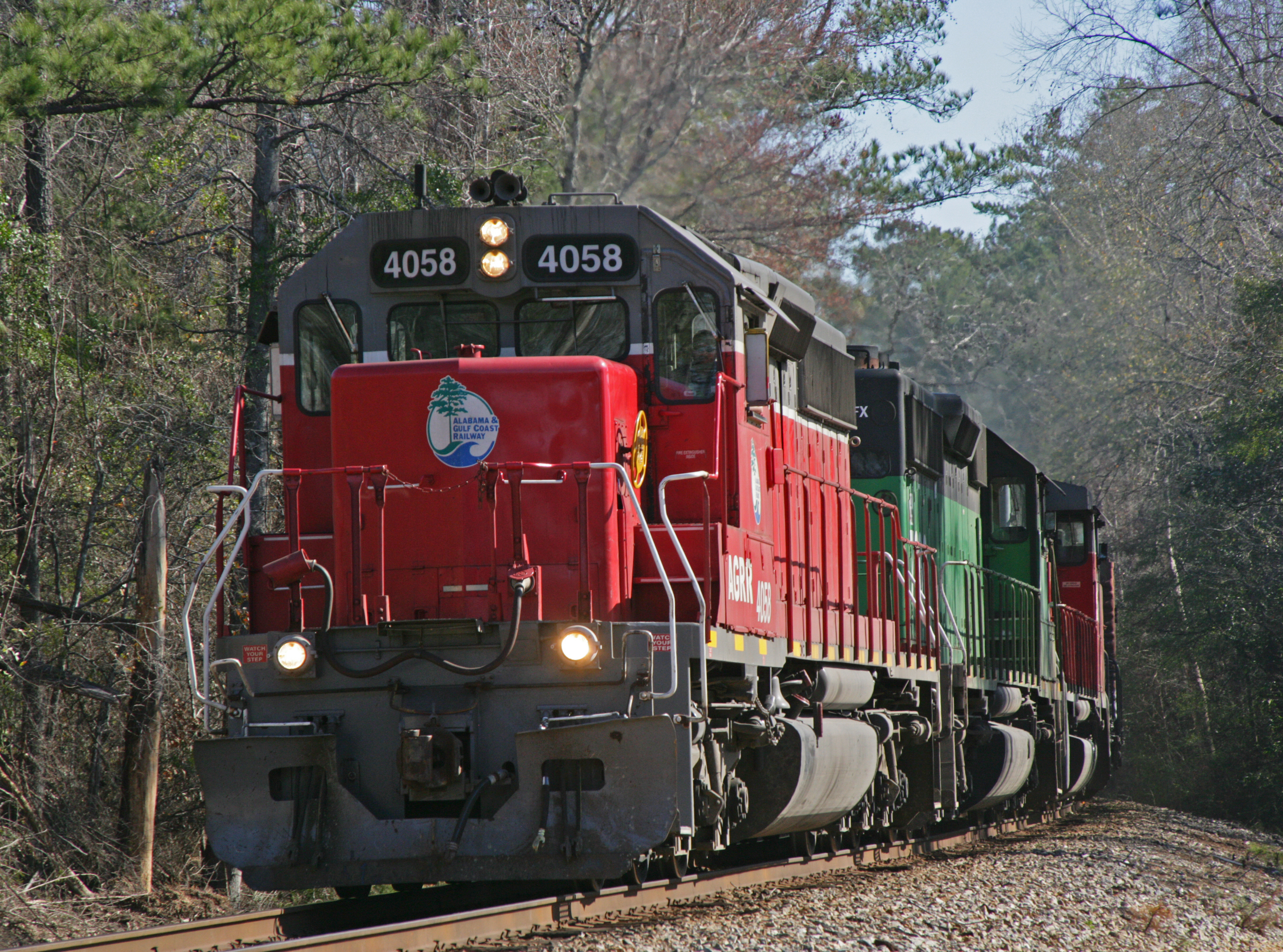
AGRR 4058, an EMD SD40-2 locomotive, operating in 2008.

Number	Type	Built	Notes
2273	EMD SD40	1973-19	Is variant SD40M-2, rebuilt by Morrison Knudsen in 1993.
3060-3062	EMD GP40	1967–1971	
3213, 3309, 3311, 3354–3362, 3373–3375, 3395, 3411–3412, 4223, 4226	EMD SD40-2	1969	4223 and 4226 are leased from Wells Fargo Rail.
3814, 3858	EMD GP38	1969–1970	

== Route ==
The AGR operates on a total of 339 miles of owned and leased trackage in Florida, Alabama, and Mississippi. Its also runs via trackage rights over BNSF Railway between Columbus and Amory, Mississippi, and Norfolk Southern Railway between Kimbrough and Mobile, Alabama. The AGR is separated into the following four subdivisions.

The following route maps at right were created using actual track charts, timetables and maps with satellite imagery.

AGR has many interchanges. Canadian National, CG Railway, CSX, Norfolk Southern, and Terminal Railway all have interchanges at Mobile, Alabama. Columbus and Greenville Railway, Golden Triangle Railroad, CPKC, and Luxapalila Valley Railroad all have an interchange at Columbus, Mississippi. BNSF has one at Amory, Mississippi, Meridian & Bigbee Railroad at Linden, Alabama, as well as CSX at Cantonment, Florida. Norfolk Southern also has more interchanges at Kimbrough, Alabama, Demopolis, Alabama, and Boligee, Alabama.

== See also ==
- St. Louis – San Francisco Railway
- List of United States railroads
- List of Florida railroads
- List of Mississippi railroads
