= List of reporting marks: P =

Note: Marks ending in U are for container owners; marks ending in X are not common carriers; marks ending in Z are for trailers without flanged wheels. All other marks are of common-carrier railroads.

== P ==
- PACY - Prairie Central Railway
- PAE - Peoria & Eastern Railway; Conrail
- PAL - Paducah & Louisville Railway
- PAM - Pittsburgh, Allegheny & McKees Rocks Railroad
- PAPX - Pullmans Inc
- PARX - Pan American Railway Company
- PARY - Prairie Trunk Railway
- PAS - Pan Am Southern
- PAUT - Pennsylvania & Atlantic Railroad; Conrail
- PAXX - Passenger Railcar Services Corporation
- PBFX - IBP, Inc.; Tyson Foods
- PBL - Philadelphia Belt Line Railroad
- PBLX - Pillsbury
- PBNE - Philadelphia, Bethlehem & New England Railroad
- PBR - Patapsco & Back Rivers Railroad
- PBRR - Prairie Belt Railroad
- PBVR - Port Bienville Railroad
- PC - Penn Central; Norfolk Southern
- PCA - Penn Central; Norfolk Southern
- PCB - Penn Central; Norfolk Southern
- PCCX - Peabody Coal Company
- PCEX - GE Capital Rail Services
- PCFX - Pacific Car & Foundry Company
- PCIX - Shippers Car Line; ACF Industries
- PCMX - Petro-Chem Marketing Company
- PCN - Point Comfort & Northern Railway
- PCRC - Panama Canal Railway Company; Kansas City Southern Railway
- PCSX - GE Capital Rail Services
- PCTX - Pioneer Cement Company of Texas
- PCY - Pittsburgh, Chartiers & Youghiogheny Railway
- PDQX - Castle Capital Corporation
- PE - Pacific Electric Railway; Conrail
- PECX - Pekin Energy Company
- PENX - Penford Products Company
- PEPX - Potomac Electric Power Company
- PER - Port Everglades Railway
- PF - Pioneer & Fayette Railroad
- PFE - Pacific Fruit Express; Union Pacific
- PFM - Power, Fluid & Metals
- PGDX - Procter & Gamble
- PGE - Pacific Great Eastern Railway; British Columbia Railway; Canadian National
- PGER - Pacific Great Eastern Railway; British Columbia Railway; Canadian National
- PGEX - Portland General Electric Company
- PGHX - Trinity Rail Management
- PGMX - Procter & Gamble
- PGR - Progressive Rail
- PHCR - Port Colborne Harbour Railway
- PHD - Port Huron & Detroit Railroad; Chessie System; CSX
- PHL - Pacific Harbor Line
- PI - Paducah & Illinois Railroad
- PICK - Pickens Railroad
- PINX - Pinnacle Polymers
- PJR - Port Jersey Railroad
- PLCX - Pullman Leasing Company; GE Capital Rail Services
- PLE - Pittsburgh & Lake Erie Railroad; New York Central Railroad; Penn Central; Conrail; CSX (after Conrail breakup)
- PLEX - PLM
- PLLU - Polynesia Line
- PLLZ - Polynesia Line
- PLMX - PLM International
- PLWX - GE Capital Rail Services
- PM - Pere Marquette Railway; Chesapeake & Ohio Railway; Chessie System; CSX
- PMLX - Prairie Malt
- PMRX - Progress Metal Reclamation Company
- PN - Piedmont & Northern Railway; Seaboard Coast Line; CSX
- PN - Pennsylvania Northeastern Railroad
- PNRW - Piedmont & Northern Railway (division of Patriot Rail Corporation)
- PNWR - Portland & Western Railroad
- PNWX - PNW Railcars
- POHC - Pittsburgh & Ohio Central Railroad
- POTB - Port of Tillamook Bay Railroad
- PPAX - PCS Phosphate Company
- PPCX - American Association of Private Railroad Car Owners
- PPGX - PPG Industries
- PPHX - PCS Phosphate Company
- PPLX - Pennsylvania Power & Light Company
- PPNX - PCS Phosphate Company
- PPRX - Phillips Petroleum Company
- PPU - Peoria & Pekin Union Railway
- PRCX - 20th Century Fox
- PRGX - ProGold
- PRL - Penn Eastern Rail Lines; East Penn Railway
- PRLX - Progress Rail Services Corporation
- PRMU - Puerto Rican Maritime Shipping Authority
- PROX - Procor
- PRR - Pennsylvania Railroad; Penn Central; Norfolk Southern
- PRRX - Norfolk Southern
- PRSL - Pennsylvania-Reading Seashore Lines; Norfolk Southern
- PRSX - Progress Rail Services Corporation
- PS - Pittsburg & Shawmut Railroad
- PSCX - Public Service Company of Colorado
- PSIX - Pacific Steel
- PSL - Peabody Short Line; Illinois Central Railroad; Canadian National
- PSPX - Phillips Petroleum Company
- PSR - Pittsburg & Shawmut Railroad
- PTM - Portland Terminal Company; Maine Central Railroad; Pan Am Railways
- PTEX - Canpotex
- PTLX - Pullman Transport Leasing; GE Capital Rail Services
- PW - Providence & Worcester Railroad
