= Sacramento Valley Railroad =

Sacramento Valley Railroad may refer to:

- Sacramento Valley Railroad (1852–1877), California's first railroad
- Sacramento Valley Railroad (2008), a switching company in McClellan Business Park
