= Mississippi and Alabama Railroad =

- Alabama and Mississippi Railroad

Overview
- Headquarters: Vinegar Bend, Alabama
- Reporting mark: A&M; M&A
- Dates of operation: 1902-1922 (A&M); 1922-1950 (M&A)

The Mississippi and Alabama Railroad (M&A) was a 17-mile (27-kilometre) railroad based in Mississippi on August 12, 1922, and the line operated between Leakesville, Mississippi to Vinegar Bend, Alabama.

== History ==
=== Alabama and Mississippi Railroad ===
The railroad was founded on March 10, 1902, as the Alabama and Mississippi Railroad (A&M), the lines the railroad had were leased, this mainline was also owned by the Vinegar Bend Lumber Company running southwest from Vinegar Bend, Alabama. This line was extended toward Leakesville, Mississippi. On July 1, 1915, the Alabama and Mississippi Railroad leased the railroad lines of the Pascagoula, Moss Point and Northern Railroad (PMPN) running north from Pascagoula to Evanston, a distance of 42 miles (68 kilometres). Beginning in 1916, the Alabama and Mississippi Railroad operated at a loss and on September 7, 1920, filed a petition with the Interstate Commerce Commission (ICC) for abandonment of the railroad. In March 1921, the U.S. District Court appointed R. V. Taylor as receiver for the railroad.

=== Mississippi and Alabama Railroad ===
On June 28, 1921, the Alabama and Mississippi Railroad was declared sold by the Federal Court. The northern portion from Vinegar Bend to Leakesville was leased to the Mississippi and Alabama Railroad in October 1922 and the southern portion from Pascagoula to Evanston was sold to the Mississippi Export Railroad (MSE) on April 17, 1923.

The Mississippi and Alabama Railroad started on August 12, 1922, to acquire the railroad lines from the Alabama and Mississippi Railroad, which was purchased at bankruptcy sale by the Leakesville Investment Company.

As a result of unprofitable operation, abandonment of the entire line was authorized by the Interstate Commerce Commission in February 1950 and operations were discontinued on March 31, 1950.

== Locomotive fleet ==
=== A&M ===
No.	Wheel arrangement	Model	Builder	Build date	Status
3	2-6-0	-	Baltimore and Ohio Railroad	-	-
4	4-6-0	-	Schenectady Locomotive Works	January 1883	Scrapped
62	2-6-0	8-30 D 90	Baldwin Locomotive Works	October 1882	Scrapped
101	2-6-0	-	Altoona Shops	-	-
103	2-6-0	-	Baldwin Locomotive Works	-	-
124	4-6-0	-	Rogers Locomotive and Machine Works	September 1886	-
132	4-6-0	-	Rogers Locomotive and Machine Works	December 1887	-

=== M&A ===
No.	Wheel arrangement	Model	Builder	Build date	Status
4	2-6-2	-	Baldwin Locomotive Works	1914	Scrapped
62	2-6-0	8-30 D 90	Baldwin Locomotive Works	October 1882	Scrapped
