= Mobile, Jackson and Kansas City Railroad =

Transport company

Mobile, Jackson and Kansas City Railroad Company (MJ&KC)
Overview
- Headquarters: Mobile, Alabama
- Locale: Southern United States
- Dates of operation: 1890–1909
- Predecessor: New Orleans, Mobile and Chicago Railroad, New Orleans Great Northern Railway
- Successor: Gulf, Mobile and Ohio

Technical
- Track gauge: 4 ft 8 1/2 in (1,435 mm) standard gauge
- Length: 827 miles (1,331 km) in 1940

The Mobile, Jackson and Kansas City Railroad Company (MJ&KC) was established in 1890 in Mobile, Alabama. By 1898 the line reached the Pascagoula River at Merrill, Mississippi. The railroad had 50 miles of trackage in 1900 and reached Hattiesburg, Mississippi, via the Bonhomie & Hattiesburg Southern Railroad in 1902.

Several mergers resulted in the MJ&KC finally emerging as the Gulf, Mobile and Ohio Railroad

== History after 1902 ==
On July 1, 1903, the MJ&KC leased the Gulf & Chicago Railroad. This line came into being after buying the Ship Island, Ripley & Kentucky (from Middleton, Tennessee 25 miles to Ripley, Mississippi), and the northern division Gulf & Ship Island line between Ripley and Pontotoc (37 miles). In 1906, about the time the railroad route was completed, the company went into bankruptcy. By March 1907 there were 402 miles of tracks and 154 sawmills along the route. In 1909, after coming out of receivership, the MJ&KC and Gulf & Chicago Railroad merged to form the New Orleans, Mobile & Chicago Railroad. A 1917 reorganization resulted in the forming of the Gulf, Mobile and Northern Railroad (GM&N). In 1929 the Meridian & Memphis and the Jackson & Eastern railroads merged into the GM&N. In 1933 the GM&N leased the New Orleans and Great Northern Railroad (NOGN). From 1935 through 1937 the line ran three Rebel streamlined diesel-electric trains between New Orleans, Louisiana, and Jackson, Tennessee. In 1940 the GM&O merged with the Mobile & Ohio (M&O) forming the Gulf, Mobile and Ohio Railroad.

== List of towns ==
Below is a list of towns and communities on the rail line from 1904 to 1907,

- Mobile, Alabama
- Orchard, Alabama
- Crusher, Alabama
- Semmes, Alabama
- Wilmer, Alabama
- Latonia, Alabama
- Shipman, Mississippi (Brushy)
- Latonia, Mississippi
- Donovan, Mississippi
- Evanston, Mississippi
- Lucedale, Mississippi
- Eubanks, Mississippi
- Bexley, Mississippi
- Merrill, Mississippi
- Leaf, Mississippi
- McLain, Mississippi
- Little Creek, Mississippi
- Beaumont, Mississippi
  - Bonhomie & Hattiesburg Southern Railroad branch
- Dickey Creek, Mississippi
- Wingate, Mississippi
- New Augusta, Mississippi
- Mahned, Mississippi
- Raglan, Mississippi
- McCallum, Mississippi
- Hattiesburg, Mississippi

In Beaumont the tracks turned northward towards Tennessee.

- Kittrell, Mississippi
- Hintonville, Mississippi
- Glazier, Mississippi
- Richton, Mississippi
- Loper, Mississippi (Rhodes)
- Ovett, Mississippi
- Ellisville Jc (Ellisville, Mississippi)
- Laurel, Mississippi
- Pierce, Mississippi
- Mossville, Mississippi
- Bay Springs, Mississippi
- Louin, Mississippi
- Montrose, Mississippi
- Roberts, Mississippi
- Newton, Mississippi
- Decatur, Mississippi
- Stratton, Mississippi
- Union, Mississippi
- McDonald, Mississippi
- Philadelphia, Mississippi
- Burnside, Mississippi
- Stallo, Mississippi
- Noxapater, Mississippi
- Louisville, Mississippi
- Sullivan, Mississippi
- Ackerman, Mississippi
- Reform, Mississippi
- Livingston, Mississippi
- Maben, Mississippi
- Dancy, Mississippi
- Sherwood, Mississippi
- Mathiston, Mississippi
- Mantee, Mississippi
- Pontotoc, Mississippi
- Ecru, Mississippi
- Ingomar, Mississippi
- New Albany, Mississippi
- Cotton Plant, Mississippi
- Blue Mountain, Mississippi
- Ripley, Mississippi
- Falkner, Mississippi
- Tiplersville, Mississippi
- Walnut, Mississippi
- Middleton, Mississippi
- Bolivar, Mississippi
- Bolivar, Tennessee
- Jackson, Tennessee

== See also ==
- List of defunct Mississippi railroads
- List of defunct Tennessee railroads
- List of defunct Alabama railroads
