= MSV =

mSv or MSV may refer to:

- Maize streak virus, a plant disease
- Medium-speed vehicle, US category
- Medium Systems Vehicle, a class of fictional artificially intelligent starship in The Culture universe of late Scottish author Iain Banks
- Millisievert, radiation unit
- Mississippi and Skuna Valley Railroad, 1925–2008, reporting mark
- Mixed single vote, a type of electoral system
- Mobile Satellite Ventures, US company
- Modular Scalable Vest, a US military body armor vest
- MotorSport Vision, a UK organisation
- M. S. Viswanathan (1928–2015), Indian composer
- Motor Stand-by Vessel, a merchant vessel name prefix
- Museum of the Shenandoah Valley, US museum
- Meaning, syntax, and visual information, a common variation of the three cueing method of reading acquisition
