= Utah Central Railway =

Utah Central Railway or Utah Central Railroad may refer to:

- Utah Central Railroad (1869–81), Ogden to Salt Lake City, later part of the Union Pacific Railroad, then became Utah Central Railway 1881–1889
- Utah Central Railway (1992), a shortline in the Ogden area
