= PRV =

== Business ==
- Park Royal Vehicles, UK manufacturer
- Pearl River Valley Railroad
- PRV engine, a V6 automobile engine
- Swedish Patent and Registration Office (Swedish: Patent- och registreringsverket)

== Places ==
- Přerov Airport, Czech Republic, IATA code
- Prime View stop, Hong Kong, MTR station code

== Science ==
- Peak reverse voltage of a diode
- Pressure relief valve
- Pseudorabies virus (PrV), a herpes-like virus affecting swine
- Piscine Reovirus, an orthoreovirus of salmon

== Other ==
- Parti radical valoisen, a political party in France
