= Terminal Railroad =

Terminal Railroad or Terminal Railway may refer to:

- Terminal railroad, a railroad that operates a terminal facility
- Terminal Railway Alabama State Docks
- Terminal Railway of Buffalo, predecessor of the New York Central Railroad
- Terminal Railroad (Chicago), predecessor of the Indiana Harbor Belt Railroad
- Terminal Railroad of East St. Louis, predecessor of the Terminal Railroad Association of St. Louis
- Terminal Railway (Oregon), predecessor of the Southern Pacific Company
- Terminal Railroad Association of St. Louis
