= Terminal Railway Alabama State Docks =

Terminal railroad

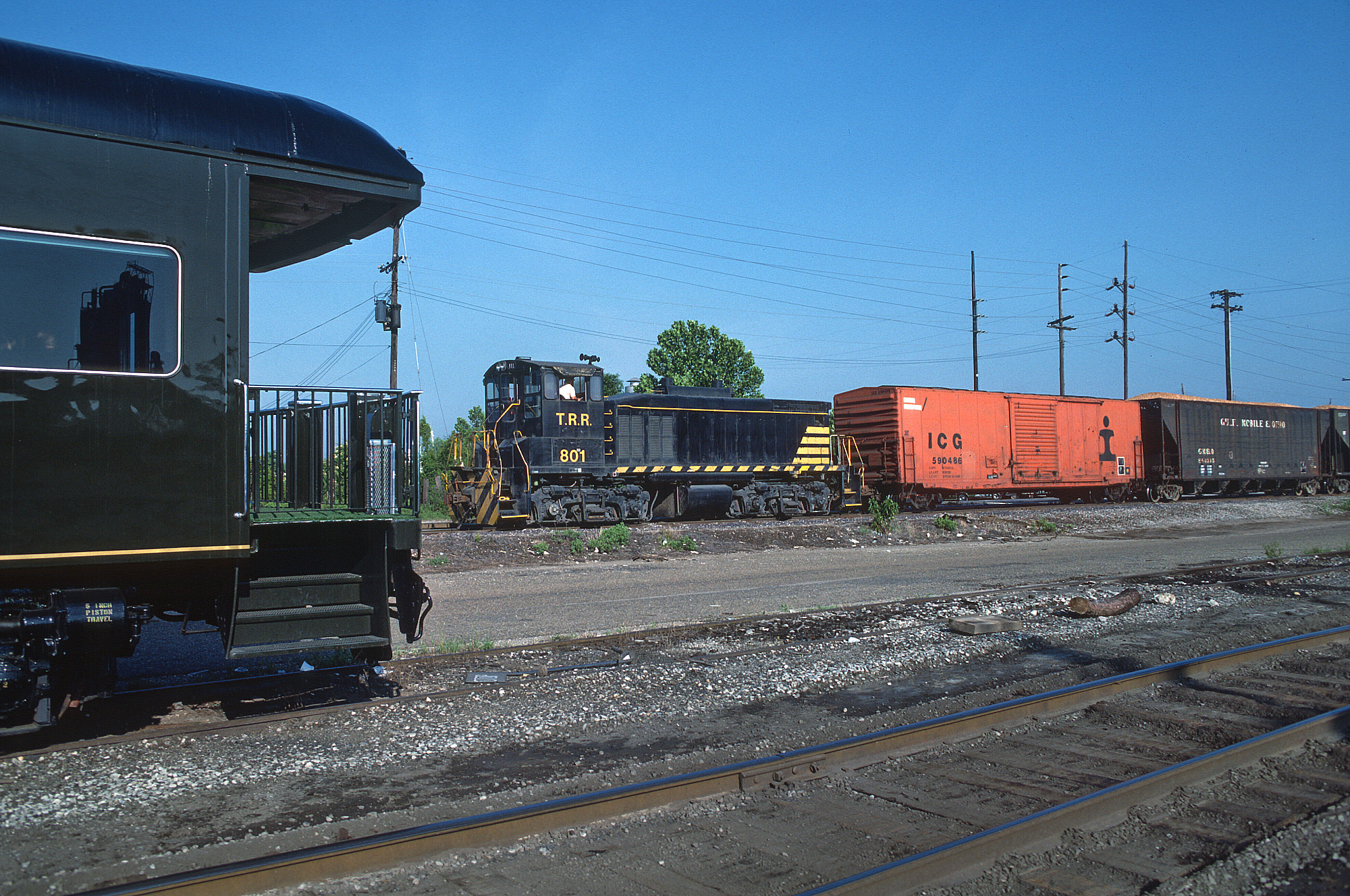
- TRR 801 and CSX Business Car 10 in Mobile, Alabama, 1987

Overview
- Headquarters: Mobile, Alabama
- Reporting mark: TASD
- Locale: Mobile, Alabama
- Dates of operation: June 1928–present

Technical
- Track gauge: 4 ft 8 1/2 in (1,435 mm) standard gauge
- Length: 75 miles (121 km)

The Terminal Railway Alabama State Docks (reporting mark TASD) is a terminal railroad, according to the AAR. It operates on about 75 miles (121 km) of track and is a subsidiary of the Alabama State Port Authority located at the Port of Mobile in Mobile, Alabama.

== Connections ==
All connections are at Mobile, Alabama.

- Alabama and Gulf Coast Railway
- Alabama Export Railway
- Burlington Northern Santa Fe
- Canadian National
- CG Railway
- CSX Transportation
- Canadian Pacific Kansas City
- Norfolk Southern

== Industries ==
The TASD serves 25 different customers, mostly in chemicals and bulk goods. The railroad moves over 100,000 carloads annually, transporting goods such as containers, coal, metal products, lumber/building supplies, paper, chemicals, petroleum products, aggregates, cement, grains, and agricultural products. The TASD also earns extra profits from the movement and storage of freight cars for other railroads.

Name	Location	Commodity	Switcher/Notes
O'Neal Transportation	Chickasaw, Alabama	I/B or O/B bulk goods	
Alter Metal Recycling	Chickasaw, Alabama	O/B scrap metal	
Gulf Atlantic Operations	Chickasaw, Alabama	I/B or O/B asphalt	
Southern Ionics	Chickasaw, Alabama	I/B or O/B chemicals	
Buchanan Lumber	Chickasaw, Alabama	I/B Lumber	
Crimson Shipping	Chickasaw, Alabama	I/B or O/B bulk goods	
Dunhill Terminals	Chickasaw, Alabama	O/B biodiesel and ethanol	One trackmobile
DPC Enterprises	Mobile, Alabama	I/B or O/B chemicals and water treatment products	One trackmobile
Occidental Chemical	Mobile, Alabama	I/B or O/B chemicals, chlorine, and alkalines	One trackmobile
Kemira Chemical	Mobile, Alabama	O/B water petrification chemical	One trackmobile
Merchants Transfer	Mobile, Alabama	I/B and O/B dry goods	
Berg Pipe	Mobile, Alabama	I/B or O/B steel pipe	
Kimberly Clark	Mobile, Alabama	I/B waste paper; O/B paper	Switched by Railserve using RSSX 8 (EMD SW1200)
Buchanan Lumber	Mobile, Alabama	O/B lumber	
Alabama State Docks bulk material handling	Mobile, Alabama	I/B or O/B coal, coke, and pig iron	
Alabama State DocksGeneral cargo and container facility	Mobile, Alabama	I/B or O/B containers and bulk dry goods	
Farmers Grain Dealers	Mobile, Alabama	I/B or O/B grain, seed, and fertilizer	
Mobile Refrigerated Services	Mobile, Alabama	I/B and O/B refrigerated goods	
Lafarge North America	Mobile, Alabama	I/B or O/B cement powder	
Southern Cement	Mobile, Alabama	I/B or O/B cement powder	
Chemex	Mobile, Alabama	I/B and O/B chemicals and pharmaceuticals	
Cytec	Mobile, Alabama	I/B and O/B chemicals	
Choctaw Point Intermodal Facility	Mobile, Alabama	I/B and O/B containers	
Frascati Shops	Mobile, Alabama	I/B and O/B railcars	
Alabama State Docks Coal transfer facility	McDuffie Island, Alabama	I/B coal	

== Equipment ==
The Terminal Railway Alabama State Docks operates eight EMD MP15 switcher locomotives.

=== Current locomotive roster ===
Model	Railroad	Quantity	Numbers	Notes
EMD MP1500	TASD	8	761*, 771+, 772*, 801^, 802*, 803, 821, 822^	* RJ Corman Tier III Re-powers in 2014-2016, ^ KLW Tier IV Re-Powers in 2020-2021, + Current KLW Tier IV Re-Power EST 2022 completion

=== Historical Locomotive Roster ===
Model	Railroad	Quantity	Numbers	Notes
Alco HH900	TASD	2	371, 372	scrapped
Alco S-2	TASD	4	451, 452, 481, 491	scrapped
Alco S-4	TASD	4	511, 521, 541, 571	scrapped
EMD SW1500	TASD	2	681, 682	scrapped
EMD MP15	NREX	2	1539, 1560	ex SOO 1539, 1560 - returned
