= Mississippian Railway =

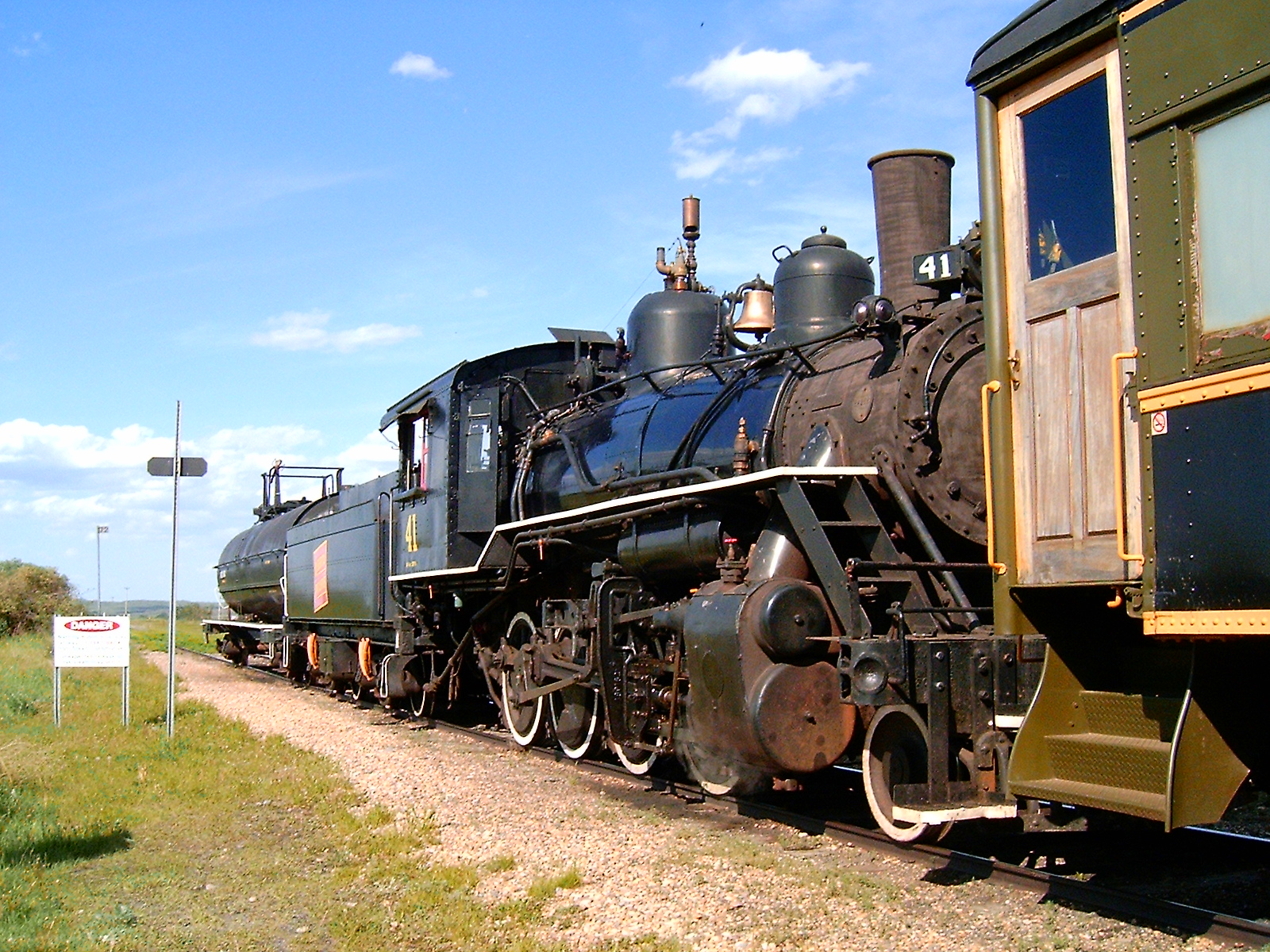
- Mississippian No. 77 on the Alberta Prairie Railway

Overview
- Headquarters: Fulton, Mississippi
- Reporting mark: MSRW
- Locale: Mississippi
- Dates of operation: 1926–present

Technical
- Track gauge: 4 ft 8 1/2 in (1,435 mm) standard gauge
- Length: 25 miles

The Mississippian Railway (reporting mark MSRW) is a short line railroad operating from Amory to Fulton, Mississippi. It is owned and operated by the Itawamba County Railroad Authority.

The MSRW interchanges with the BNSF Railway at Amory. The MSRW's shops are also located in Amory.

== History ==
The Mississippian Railway was established in 1923 primarily to haul lumber products from Fulton south to the interchange with the Frisco Railway in Amory.

In 1944 a bentonite plant was built in Smithville to take advantage of a large deposit discovered there which led to a surge in business for the line and its nickname The Bentonite Road. By 1968 the bentonite deposits near Smithville had been depleted and the plant closed, however several industries had moved to Fulton and continued to provide traffic for the railroad.

In the late 1970s, construction of the Tennessee–Tombigbee Waterway threatened to flood about nine miles of track. The U.S. Army Corps of Engineers decided it would be cheaper to abandon the line than pay to relocate it. Local business owners and public officials teamed up with the Appalachian Regional Commission to save the railroad. They successfully lobbied the Interstate Commerce Commission to withhold the sale of the line until the funds to purchase it could be found.

In 1986, the Itawamba County Development Council purchased the Mississippian Railway and transferred it over to the Mississippian Railway Cooperative, an entity directly representing industries that relied on the railroad to transport their products. County leaders raised several million dollars to upgrade the severely degraded track to a condition where reliable service could be provided.

In 2016, the Mississippian Railway Cooperative transferred the assets to the Itawamba County Railroad Authority, which also took over the operation of the railroad.

Today, the Mississippian hauls between 100 and 120 cars a month operating three days a week.

== Motive power ==
The railroad previously operated a pair of 1920 Baldwin 2-8-0s until 1967 when diesels replaced them. Currently the MSRW operates an EMD GP7 (no. 102).

== Preservation ==
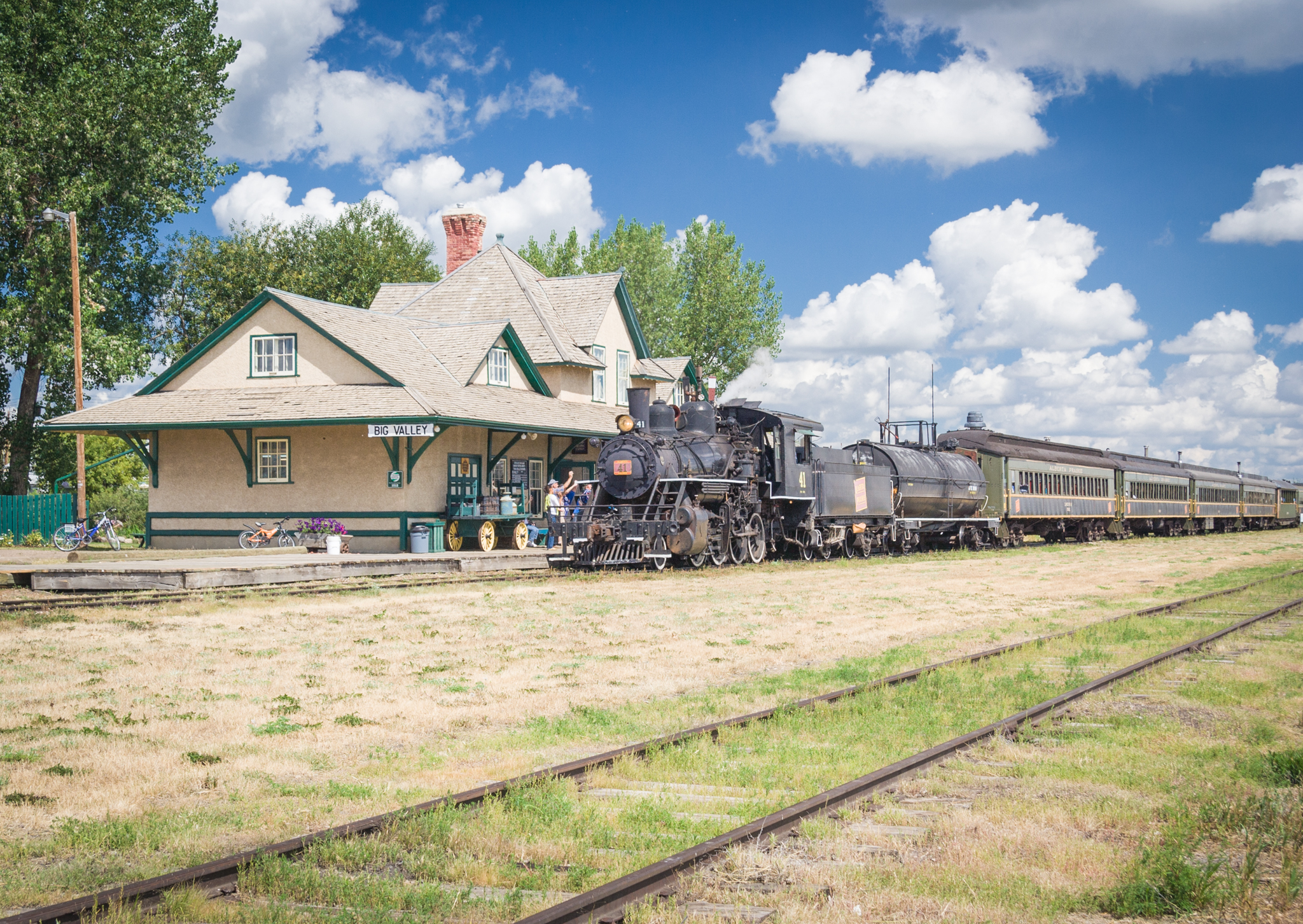
Mississippian No. 77 (renumbered 41) at Big Valley Station

The two Baldwin 2-8-0 Consolidation steam locomotives survive:

- Mississippian No. 76 was built as No. 40 in December, 1920 for the Jonesboro, Lake City and Eastern Railroad. When that line became part of the Frisco, the locomotive was re-numbered as 76. After performing freight service for years, the engine was sold to the Mississippian in 1947 where it retained the Frisco number. Following several further changes in ownership, including the Gettysburg Railroad, the Ohio Central Railroad, and the Steam Railroading Institute, No. 76 is now owned by the B&O Railroad Museum in Oakland, Maryland, where it has been renumbered and relettered as the Baltimore and Ohio No. 476.
- Mississippian No. 77 had a similar history, having been built in December 1920 as No. 41 for the JLC&E, and passing through Frisco service as No. 77 before arriving in 1947 with the Mississippian. After passing through further ownership, No. 77 is now with Alberta Prairie Railway in Stettler, Alberta, Canada, where it pulls excursion trains and where it has been renumbered back to the original 41.

== See also ==
- List of United States railroads
- List of Mississippi railroads

== Sources ==
- "Mississippi Rails".
- "Hawkins Rails". Archived from the original on September 20, 2012.
- "Homan Industries". Archived from the original on April 26, 2012.
- Dabbs v. International Minerals & Chem. Corp. (US District Court for the N District of MS, Eastern Division. February 24, 1972), Text.
- Baldwin, Fred D. (2001), Keeping the Line Open: The Mississippian Railway Cooperative, Appalachia Magazine
- Robbie, JT (May 2009), Alberta Prairie Railway: What do a Mississippi steam locomotive, a grocery store owner, and a desire for hope in a small Canadian town have in common?, Trains Magazine, archived from the original on June 30, 2013 – via HighBeam Research
