= Polynesia Line =

Container shipping company with a focus on the Pacific Ocean

Polynesia Line, Ltd.

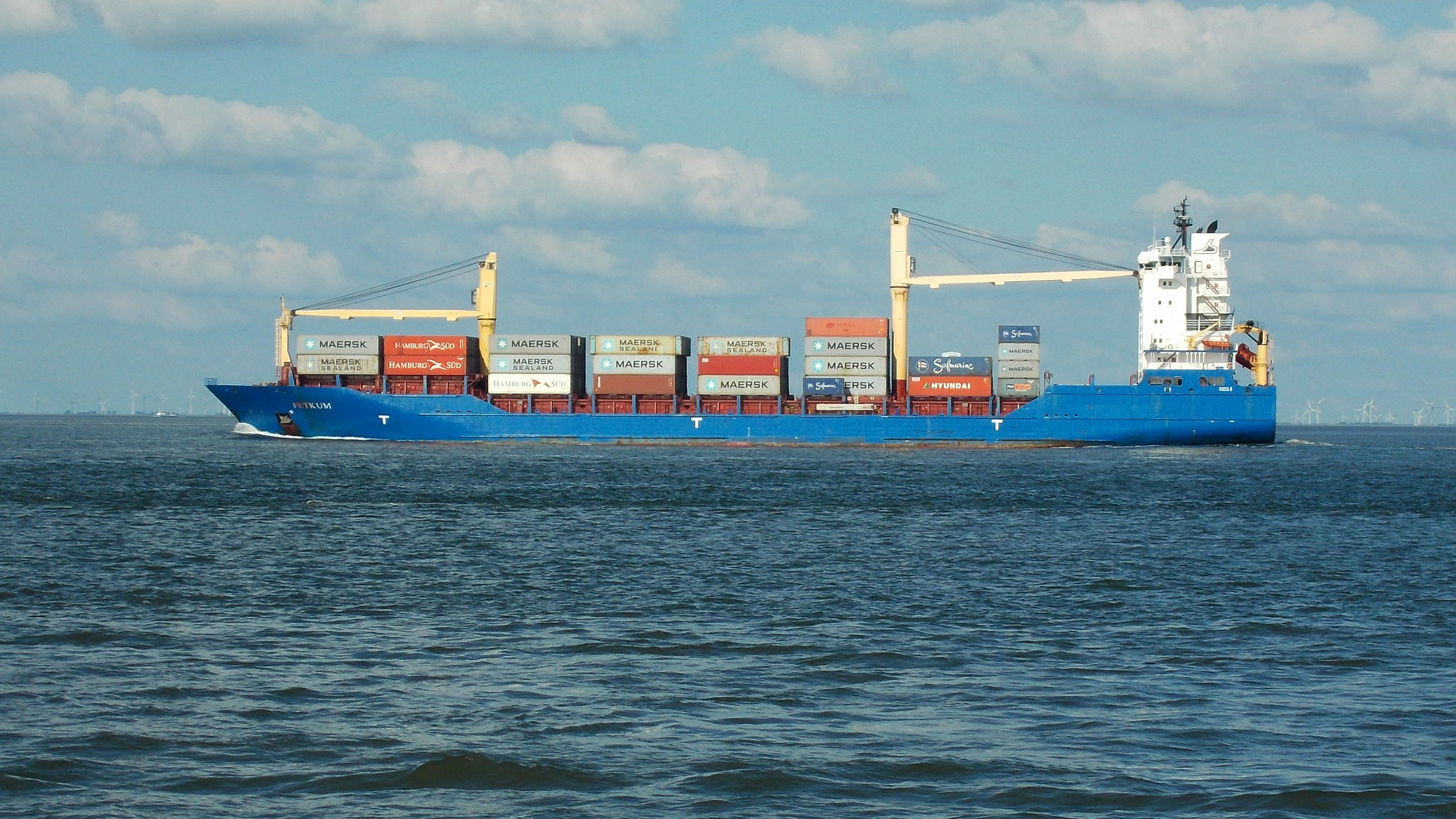
- Industry: Transport
- Founded: 1967
- Headquarters: San Rafael, California
- Area served: Polynesia, US west coast
- Key people: Jens Jensen (former President)
- Products: Shipping; Cargo; Freight distribution
- Parent: China Navigation Company
- Website: polynesialine.com

Polynesia Line, based in San Rafael, CA, is an ocean container shipping line specializing in trade between the South Pacific islands and the US Pacific coast. Polynesia Line serves SSA Terminals in Long Beach, OICT in Oakland, Tahiti, American Samoa, Samoa, and Tonga. The company's agent in the US is called Interocean Steamship Corporation. Polynesia Line is wholly owned by China Navigation Co.

== History ==
Polynesia Line was founded in 1967 to ship tuna out of Pago Pago, American Samoa. Over the next several years, the company grew its shipping business and added port calls around the south Pacific islands such as Papeete, Apia, and Nuku'alofa. In 1979, China Navigation Co. acquired 13% of Polynesia Line, becoming a minor shareholder. In 1999, Polynesia Line and Hamburg Süd announced a vessel-sharing alliance in the US west coast–South Pacific trade route.

In 2013, China Navigation Co. purchased all the remaining shares of Polynesia Line. China Navigation Co. retained the Polynesia management and brand. Polynesia Line became part of Swire Shipping, the ocean shipping arm of China Navigation.

== See also ==
- List of largest container shipping companies
