= Gulf, Mobile and Northern Railroad =

Transport company

Overview
- Headquarters: Mobile, Alabama
- Locale: Southern United States
- Dates of operation: 1917–1940
- Predecessor: New Orleans, Mobile and Chicago Railroad, New Orleans Great Northern Railroad
- Successor: Gulf, Mobile and Ohio

Technical
- Track gauge: 4 ft 8 1/2 in (1,435 mm) standard gauge
- Length: 827 miles (1,331 km) in 1940

The Gulf, Mobile and Northern Railroad (reporting mark GMN) was a railroad in the Southern United States. The first World War had forced government operation upon the company; and in 1919, when it became once more a free agent, it chose Isaac B. Tigrett to chart its new course. Tigrett, a native of Jackson, Tennessee, was president of the GM&N from 1920 and of its successor, the GM&O, from 1938 to 1952, and oversaw the development of the road from a nearly bankrupt operation into a thriving success. He was the great-uncle of Hard Rock Cafe founder Isaac Tigrett, also a native of Jackson.

At the end of 1925 GM&N operated 466 miles of road and 574 miles of track; that year it reported 419 million ton-miles of revenue freight and 12 million passenger-miles.

On September 13, 1940, the GM&N merged with the Mobile and Ohio Railroad to form the Gulf, Mobile and Ohio Railroad.

== See also ==
- Rebel, lightweight streamline trains, built for the GM&N, by ACF
- List of defunct Alabama railroads
- List of defunct Kentucky railroads
- List of defunct Louisiana railroads
- List of defunct Mississippi railroads
- List of defunct Tennessee railroads
