= Utah Central Railway (1992) =

American railroad

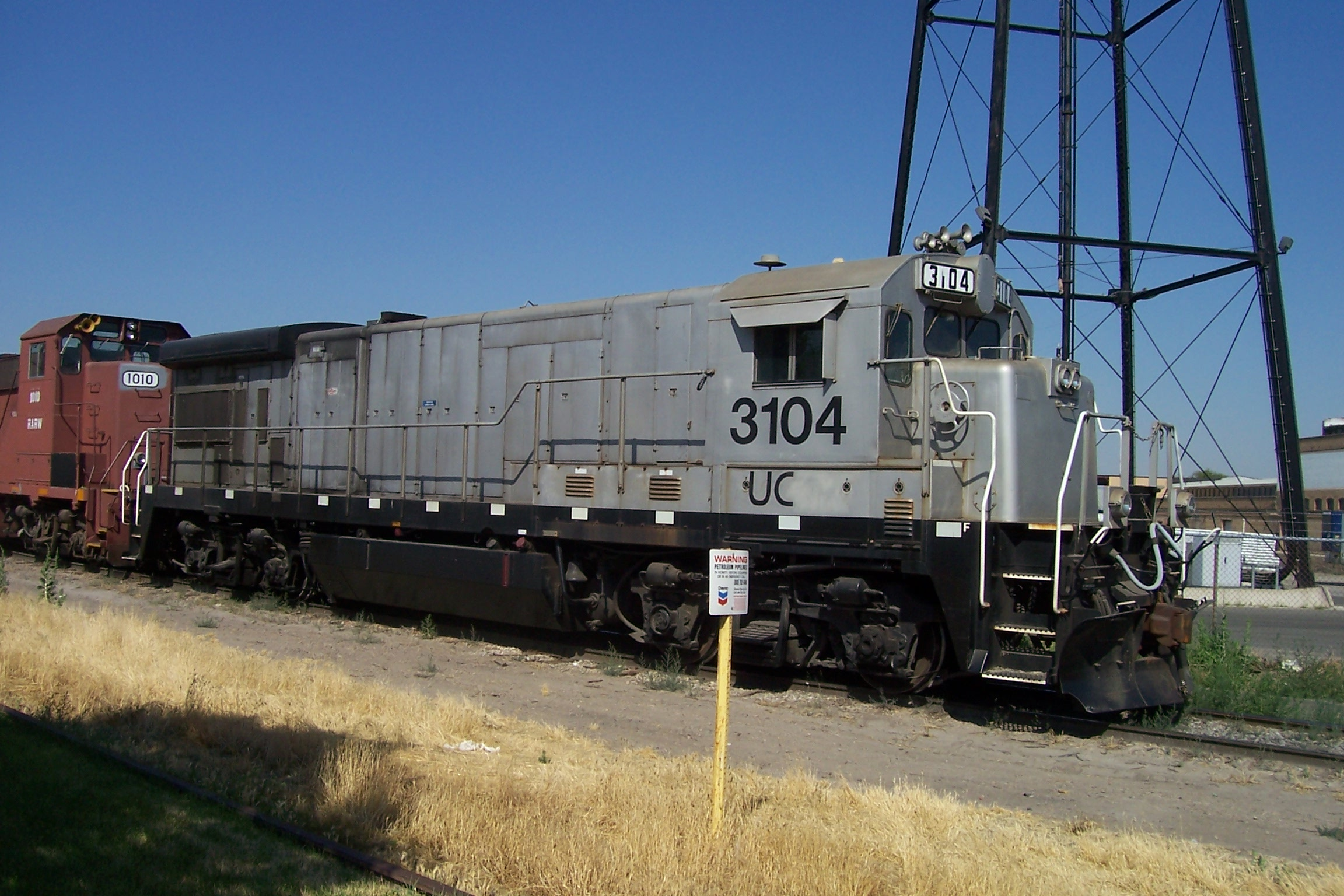
- Utah Central 3104 in Ogden

Overview
- Headquarters: Ogden, Utah
- Reporting mark: UCRY
- Locale: Ogden, Utah
- Dates of operation: 1992–

Technical
- Track gauge: 4 ft 8 1/2 in (1,435 mm) standard gauge

The Utah Central Railway (reporting mark UCRY) is a shortline railroad serving Ogden, Utah and surrounding areas. It interchanges with the Union Pacific Railroad (UP), as well as with BNSF Railway trains running over the UP via trackage rights. The company began operations in 1992 as a private switching railroad, and became a common carrier in 1995. It expanded operations in 2001 and 2004, and the Patriot Rail Corporation gained control in January 2008.

== History ==
UCRY's first operations, which began in September 1992, were under contract to Westinghouse Electric, switching cars at the Western Zirconium Plant west of Ogden for interchange with UP and the Denver and Rio Grande Western Railroad (by then operating as a subsidiary of the Southern Pacific). In October 1995 it began common carrier service on industrial trackage in Ogden, which it acquired from the city. Here too it interchanged with both the UP and Southern Pacific, the former on its old line next to Midland Drive. In 2001, UCRY leased a number of Ogden-area branch lines from the UP, which had absorbed the Southern Pacific; this included the remnants of the old UP and Rio Grande main lines west of downtown Ogden. Finally, in 2004, UCRY acquired the trackage serving Business Depot Ogden from a UP connection.

At one point the UCRY leased a 44-ton GE diesel and class CA-11 caboose from the Utah State Railroad Museum in Ogden, Utah. Both the locomotive and caboose were repainted in UCRY colors. When returned to the museum, the locomotive sat idle for several years.

For many years, the Business Depot was served by an ex-Air Force Fairbanks-Morse H-12-44. In July 2010, the UCRY repainted their ex-Rarus Railway GP9 black with a large "Utah Central" in gold across the engine compartment, and moved it to BDO to replace the FM locomotive. Reason for this replacement is unknown; according to a Utah Central employee, the H-12-44 had only 100 running hours when overhauled in 1998. The locomotive has since been scrapped due to inability to donate because of ownership issues.

In September 2010, two GP-15 diesel locomotives 1418 and 1401, refurbished from LTEX were delivered to the UCRY's headquarters at the old sugar factory. They are painted in the distinctive Patriot Rail corporate scheme (red overall with a blue stripe highlighted by gold pin stripes down the middle with an eagle on the nose).

== Locomotives ==
The Utah Central was once known for its eclectic mix of second-hand locomotives. For a time no two were painted alike (excepting nos. 1418 and 1401). Some notable former examples of this are an ex-Kennecott High-Clearance GP-39 locomotive originally used in the Bingham Canyon copper pit (RARW 1010) and an ex-Rarus Railway chop-nose GP9 (UCRY 201). Currently most of the Utah Central locomotive fleet is painted in the colors of its parent Patriot Rail.

RARW 1010 has since left the property for contract switching in Colorado, having been repainted as Patriot Rail 1010

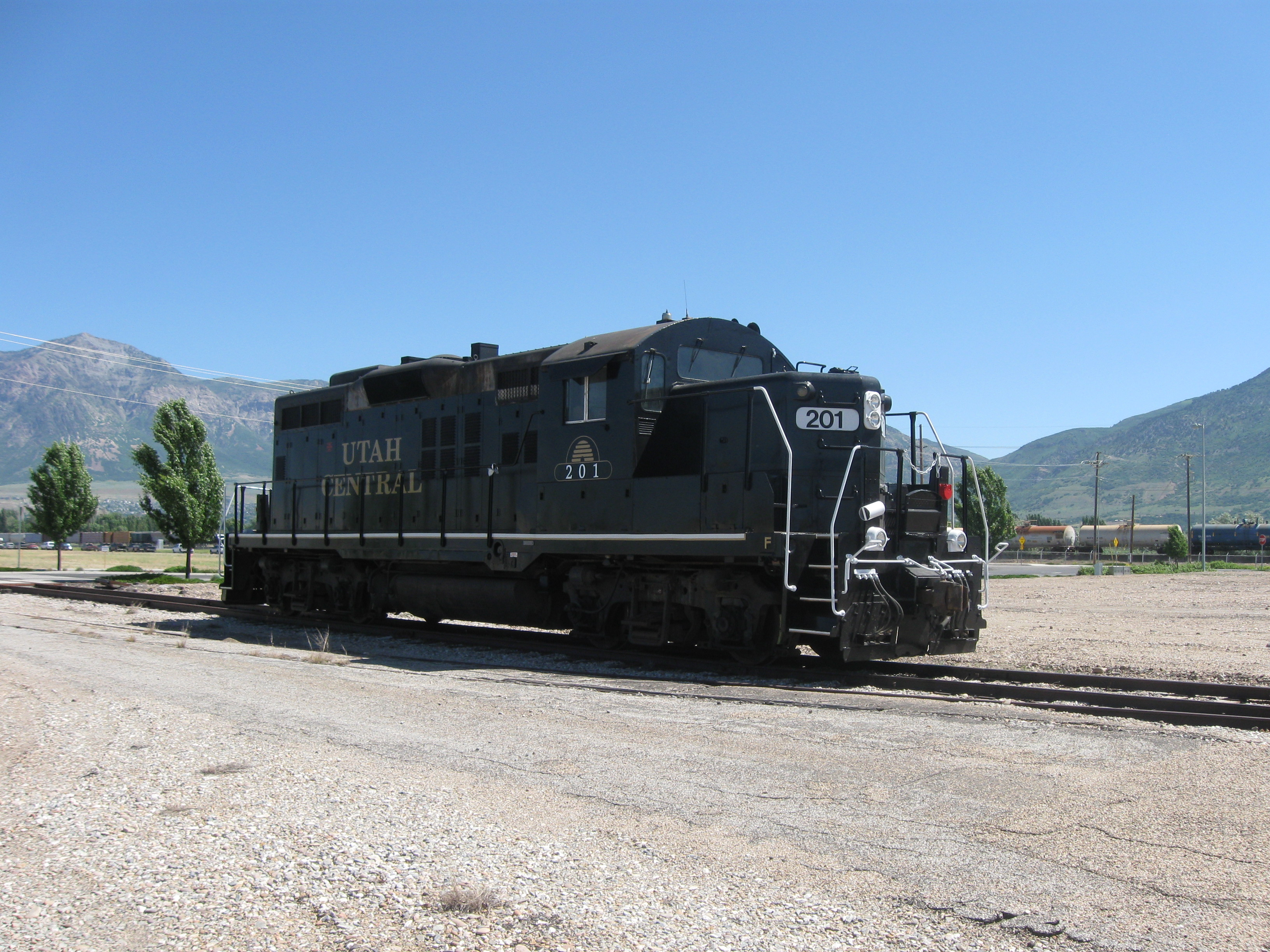
Utah Central 201, ex-Rarus Railway 201, at Business Depot Ogden, Ogden, Utah

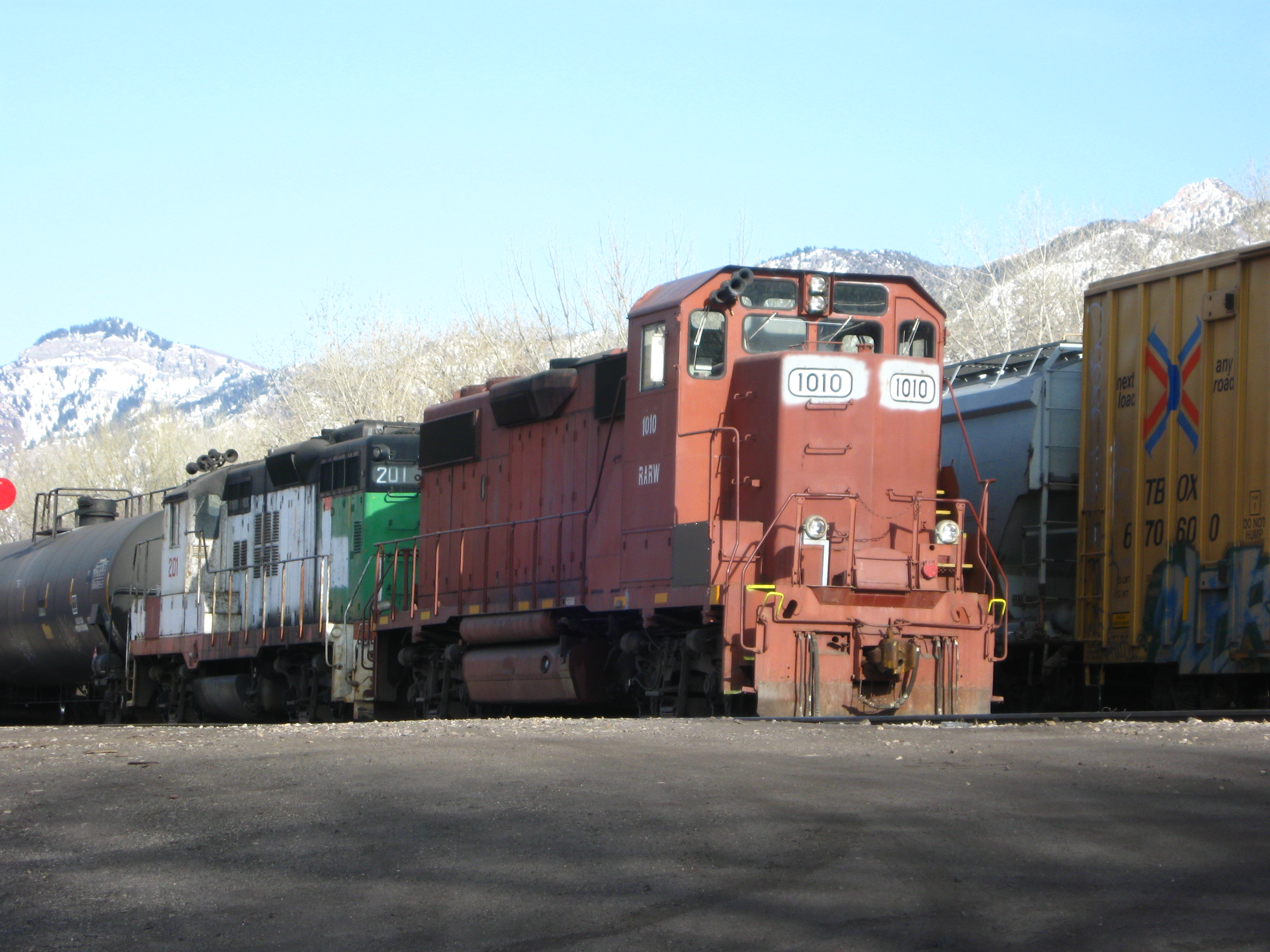
Utah Central 1010, ex-Kennecott Copper, ex-Rarus Railway GP39 at the former D&RGW yard in Ogden, Utah

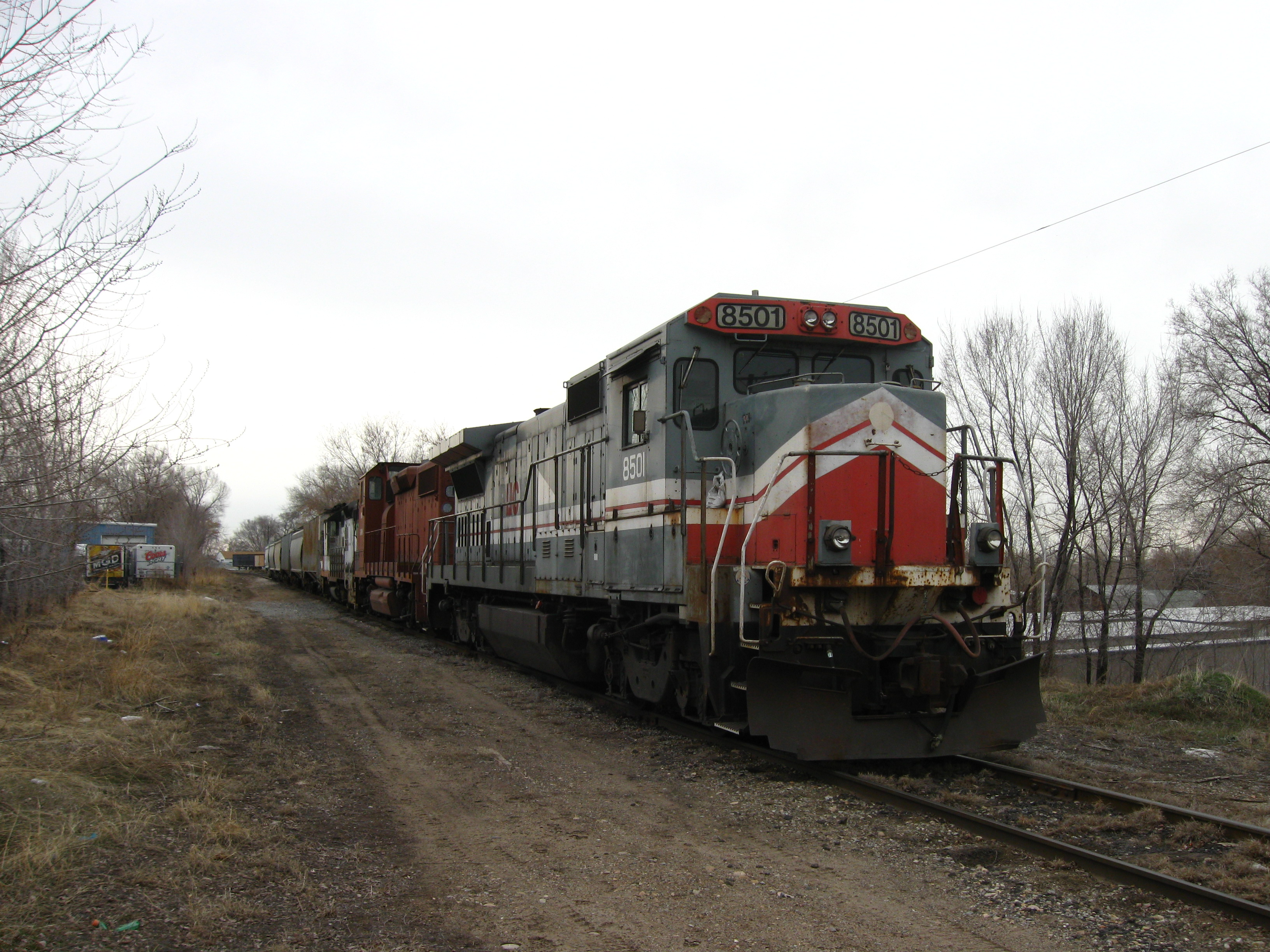
Utah Central 8501, ex-LMX on 23rd Street, Ogden, Utah

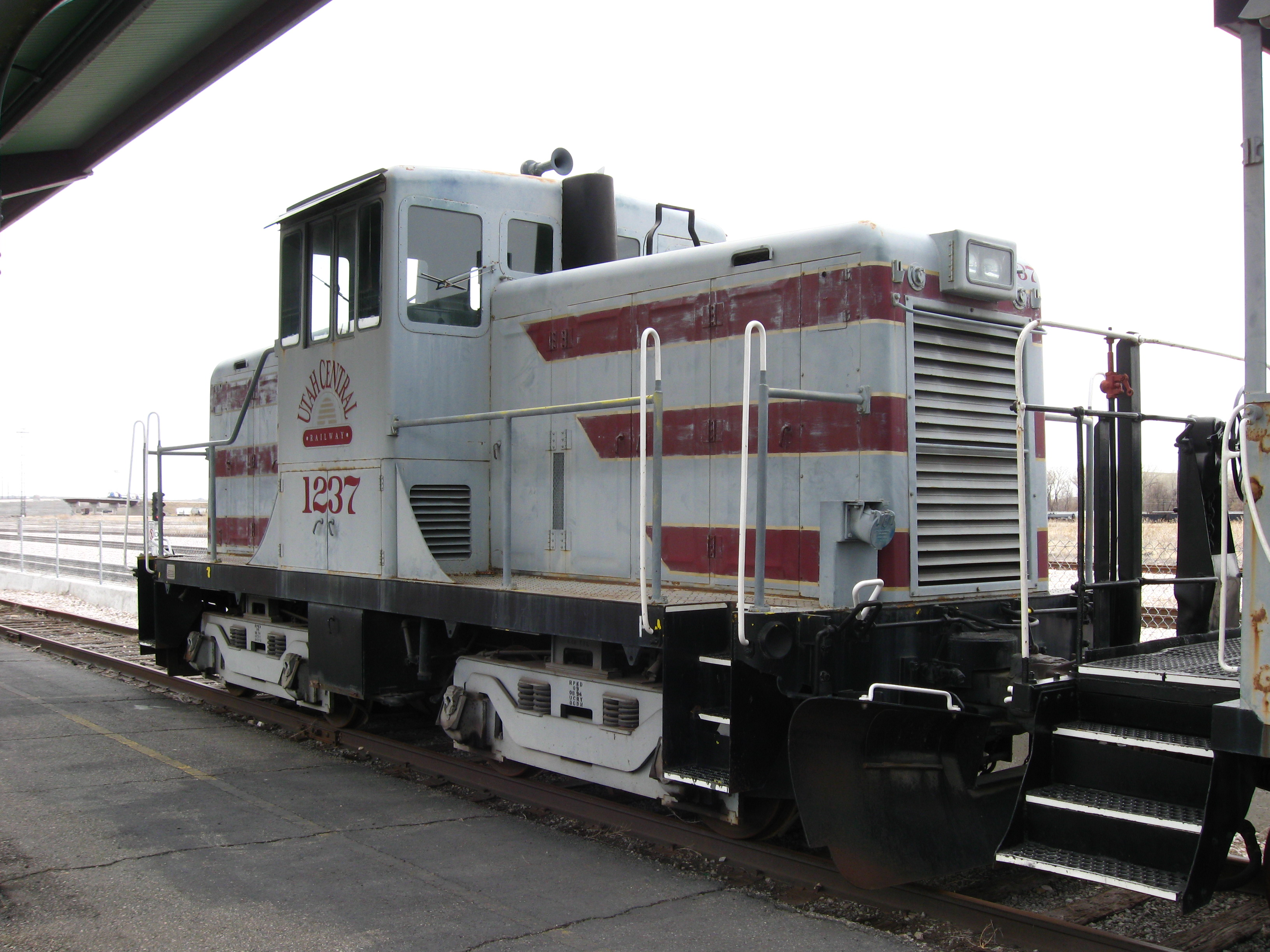
Utah Central 1237, ex-U.S. Air Force 44-ton locomotive at the Utah State Railroad Museum, Ogden, Utah. It is currently not operational.
