= Golden Triangle Railroad =

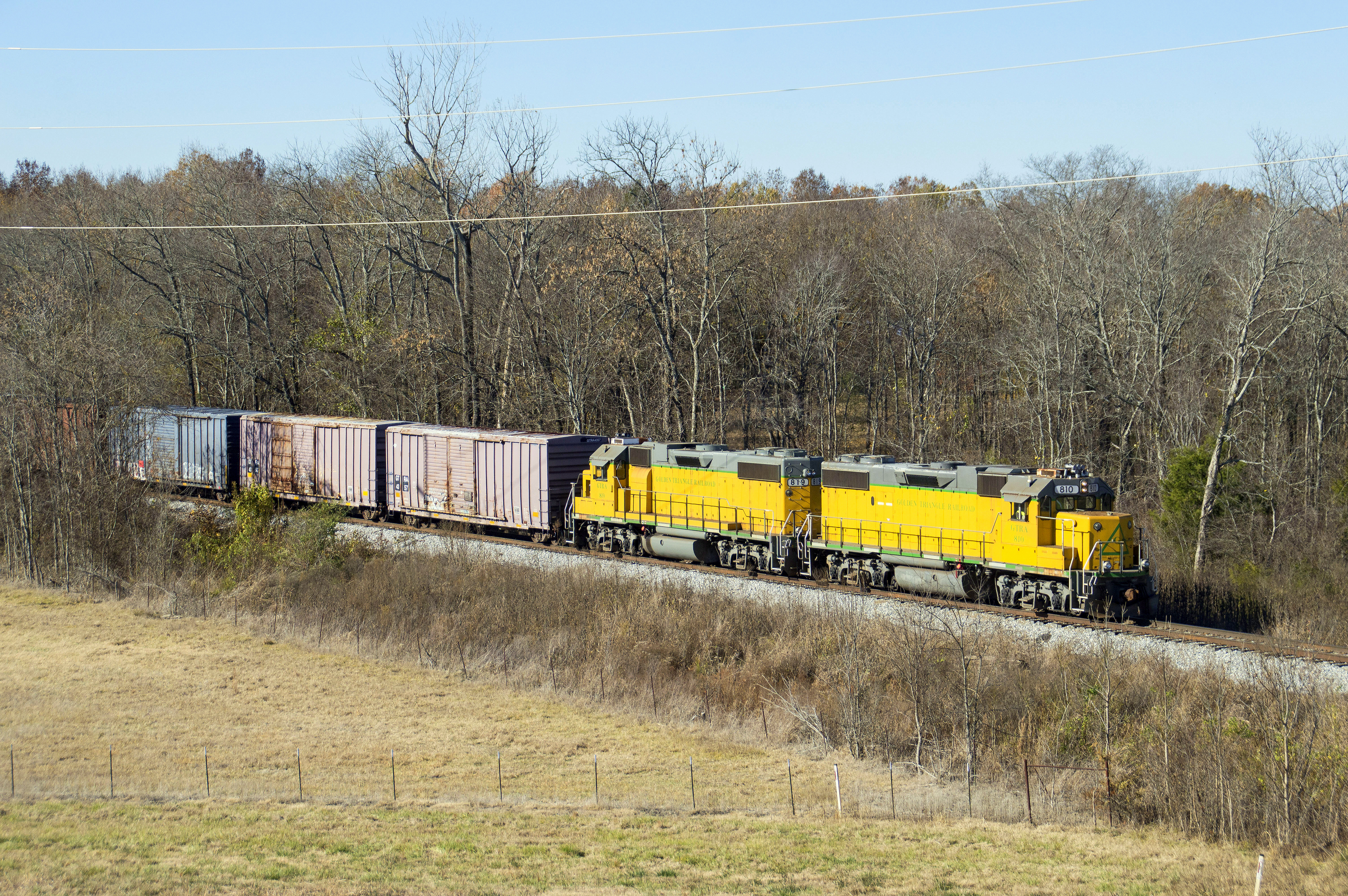
- GTRA train with the company's two EMD GP38-2 locomotives south of Columbus; 2016

Overview
- Headquarters: Columbus, Mississippi
- Reporting mark: GTRA
- Dates of operation: 1981–present

Technical
- Track gauge: 4 ft 8 1/2 in (1,435 mm) standard gauge
- Length: 10 miles (16 km)

The Golden Triangle Railroad (reporting mark GTRA) is a railway in central Mississippi, totalling 10 miles (16 km) length. It is owned by the Patriot Rail Corporation. The GTRA interchanges with the Kansas City Southern Railway (KCS) at Columbus, Mississippi, and with Burlington Northern Santa Fe, Columbus & Greenville, Luxapalila Valley and Norfolk Southern via trackage rights over the KCS.

The GTRA serves an International Paper fiber mill in Trinity. It primarily hauls woodpulp, corn starch and chemicals, and utilises three locomotives. As of 2011, the GTRA employed nine workers.
