= Meridian and Bigbee Railroad =

Railroad in Alabama and Mississippi, U.S.

Overview
- Parent company: Genesee & Wyoming (2005-2024)
- Headquarters: Meridian, Mississippi
- Reporting mark: MNBR
- Locale: Mississippi / Alabama
- Dates of operation: 1926–2024
- Successor: CSX Transportation (Eastern Line); CPKC Haverty Subdivision (Western Line)

Technical
- Track gauge: 4 ft 8 1/2 in (1,435 mm) standard gauge
- Length: 168 mi (270 km)

Other
- Website: gwrr.com/mnbr

The Meridian and Bigbee Railroad (reporting mark MNBR) was a Class III railroad that operates over 168 miles (270 km) of track between Meridian, Mississippi and Burkville, Alabama. Additionally, the M&B had trackage rights over CSX from Burkville to Montgomery, Alabama. MNBR used to operate with a 286,000-pound railcar loading capacity.

== History ==
The M&B was chartered on December 24, 1926. Construction advanced eastward to Cromwell, Alabama in April 1928 and finally to Myrtlewood, Alabama, where it connected with the Louisville and Nashville Railroad (L&N) in 1935. The railroad operated with steam locomotives until 1953. Today, engine #116, a 2-8-0 Consolidation built by the Baldwin Locomotive Works in 1917 originally for the Susquehanna and New York Railroad is the only surviving M&B steam locomotive left. It is currently on display at Highland Park in Meridian.

In 2003 the M&B took over the ex-L&N line from Myrtlewood to Selma, Alabama and the ex-Western Railway of Alabama line from Selma to Burkville. CSX retained ownership between Montgomery and Burkville, where there is a large industrial customer.

In 2005, Genesee & Wyoming Inc. acquired MNBR.

In 2007, the line gained publicity when a train hauling parts of the Space Shuttle solid rocket booster derailed on an overloaded bridge weakened by heavy rains.

Between 2018 and 2022, more than $21 million of investments were made in MNBR, including improvements at Naheola Yard and Meridian Yard. The Meridian Yard improvements were the result of a public-private partnership between Mississippi Department of Transportation and MNBR. During that period, more than 99,000 new crossties and switch ties were installed. More than $7 million was invested to improve grade crossings and to repair and upgrade bridges along the line.

On June 28, 2023, Canadian Pacific Kansas City and CSX Transportation announced the intention to jointly acquire the MNBR line. Under the proposed agreement, CPKC would acquire the 50.4 miles (81.1 km) segment of the line between Meridian and Myrtlewood, Alabama, so-called Western Line, while CSX will resume operations on the so-called Eastern Line, between Myrtlewood and Burkville, terminating the lease currently in place with MNBR. MNBR will cease operations between Myrtlewood and Burkville, although it may continue to operate between Myrtlewood and Meridian and serve existing customers on that segment of the line. If approved by the STB, this would provide a direct connection between the two companies. In compensation, Genesee & Wyoming would receive CPKC properties in Alberta along with rights on CPKC lines. The connection through the MNBR line will allow CSX traffic destined for Mexico to be delivered directly to CPKC, eliminating the need for an intermediary railroad to move such traffic. Currently, CSX traffic going to Mexico is exchanged with the Union Pacific Railroad in New Orleans, who then takes it to the cross-border gateway in Laredo, Texas, where it is delivered to CPKC.

Kansas City Southern, one of CPKC's predecessor railroads, attempted a joint purchase with CSX of the MNBR line more than two decades ago. The deal was scrapped for fear of angering BNSF and Union Pacific, the two dominant railroads in the west, who did not want CSX or Norfolk Southern to do business with KCS.

If the purchase plan is approved, CPKC and CSX plan to strengthen the MNBR track to Class III standards, which will allow 40 mph (64 km/h) operation, up from the 10 to 25 mph (16 to 40 km/h) currently allowed. CPKC will also improve its connection in Meridian, which will include increasing clearances to allow double-stack trains. If traffic over the line increases, CPKC President and CEO Keith Creel said centralized traffic control could be added, and track could be further improved to Class IV standards, allowing speeds to be increased to 60 mph (97 km/h).

MNBR's Western Line, once acquired by CPKC, will be renamed Haverty Subdivision, in honor of former KCS CEO and President Mike Haverty, the original driver of the idea to acquire MNBR more than two decades ago, to tie the KCS and CSX rail networks.

In October 2024, the STB approved CPKC's purchase of the line between Meridian and Myrtlewood, and the resumption of CSX operations between Myrtlewood and Burkville, marking the end of nearly 98 years of Meridian & Bigbee history. The approval became effective on November 16, 2024.
