= Mississippi Export Railroad =

Shortline railroad in Mississippi

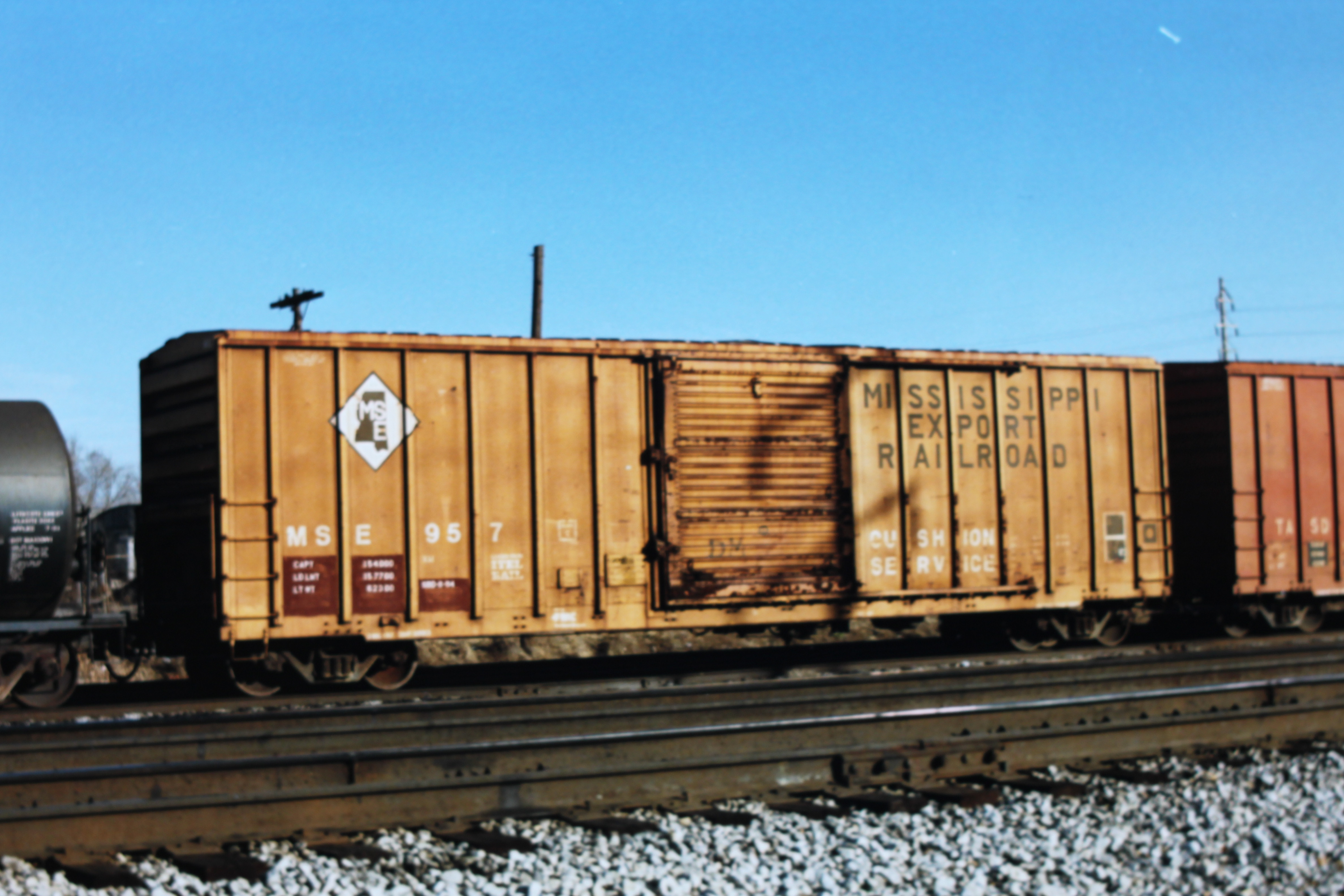
- A boxcar owned by the Mississippi Export Railroad.

Overview
- Headquarters: Moss Point, Mississippi
- Reporting mark: MSE
- Locale: Southern United States
- Dates of operation: 1922–Present

Technical
- Length: 42 mi (68 km)

Other
- Website: http://www.mserr.com/

The Mississippi Export Railroad (MSE) is a 42-mile shortline railroad founded in 1922 which operates in the state of Mississippi from Pascagoula to Evanston. The company owns a north–south line between its two termini, along which it interchanges with Canadian National and CSX. The MSE also connects to the NS in Mobile, Alabama, and Hattiesburg, Mississippi, and KCS in Jackson, Mississippi, through haulage agreements. The MSE also has access to the Terminal Alabama State Docks and the Port of Pascagoula through reciprocal switch with its subsidiary Alabama Export Railroad.

== History ==
=== Moss Point & Pascagoula Railroad (1894 - 1922) ===
The company traces its roots to the Moss Point & Pascagoula Railroad, which was formed in 1894 and began operating between its namesake cities the next year. Initially a very small railroad with only four miles of track, it grew significantly starting in 1902 when it was purchased by the owner of a sawmill in Moss Point. The railroad gained an additional 38 miles of tracks within the next year.

The railroad was severely affected by a hurricane in 1906, declaring bankruptcy three years later. In 1912, the railroad was purchased by new owners, who extended the line to connect to their lumbermill in Vinegar Bend, Alabama. In 1915, they renamed the company the Alabama and Mississippi railroad, to reflect that it now extended to two states. During World War I, the company again struggled financially, and the owners filed with the Interstate Commerce Commission to abandon the entire line in 1920. As a result, the company was declared insolvent and entered receivership.

=== Mississippi Export Railroad (1922 - 1950) ===
The bankrupt A&M railroad was purchased by Gregory M. Luce in 1922, and acquired its current name. At this point, the railroad extended from the city limits of Pascagoula north to Luce Farms, near Evanston. The railroad served a variety of industries, including shipbuilding on the coast, lumber mills, and a number of factories.

In 1940, the company bought its first diesel locomotive. Six years later, the railroad tested the first and only locomotive ever produced by Ingalls Shipbuilding.

=== Growth in the 20th century (1950 - 2000) ===
The company significantly grew its business during the 1950s, adding new customers such as a paper mill, chemical plants, and a pet food manufacturer. A major grain elevator opened in Pascagoula in 1961, providing more business for the railroad. The Mississippi Export Railroad was featured in 1974 on the news program On the Road.

Starting in the late 1990s, the railroad was involved in an expansion of the Helena Industrial Park, located in Moss Point.

=== The 21st century (2000 - present) ===
In 2013, the railroad finished building the Escatawpa River Barge Terminal, allowing for cargo to be transloaded between the railroad and ships.

== Current operations ==
As of 2021, Mississippi Export Railroad was a Class III railroad serving local industries. MSE has a full service maintenance and repair railcar and locomotive shop.

Preceded by Napoleon, Defiance & Western Railroad; Aberdeen, Carolina and Western Railway	Short Line Railroad of the Year; 2024; Honorable mention: Eastern Idaho Railroad	Succeeded by Rochester & Erie Railway; Honorable mentions: Central Montana Rail, Columbus & Ohio River Rail Road, Great Sandhills Railway, R.J. Corman Railroad Company West Virginia Line
