= Vinegar Bend, Alabama =

- Census-designated place
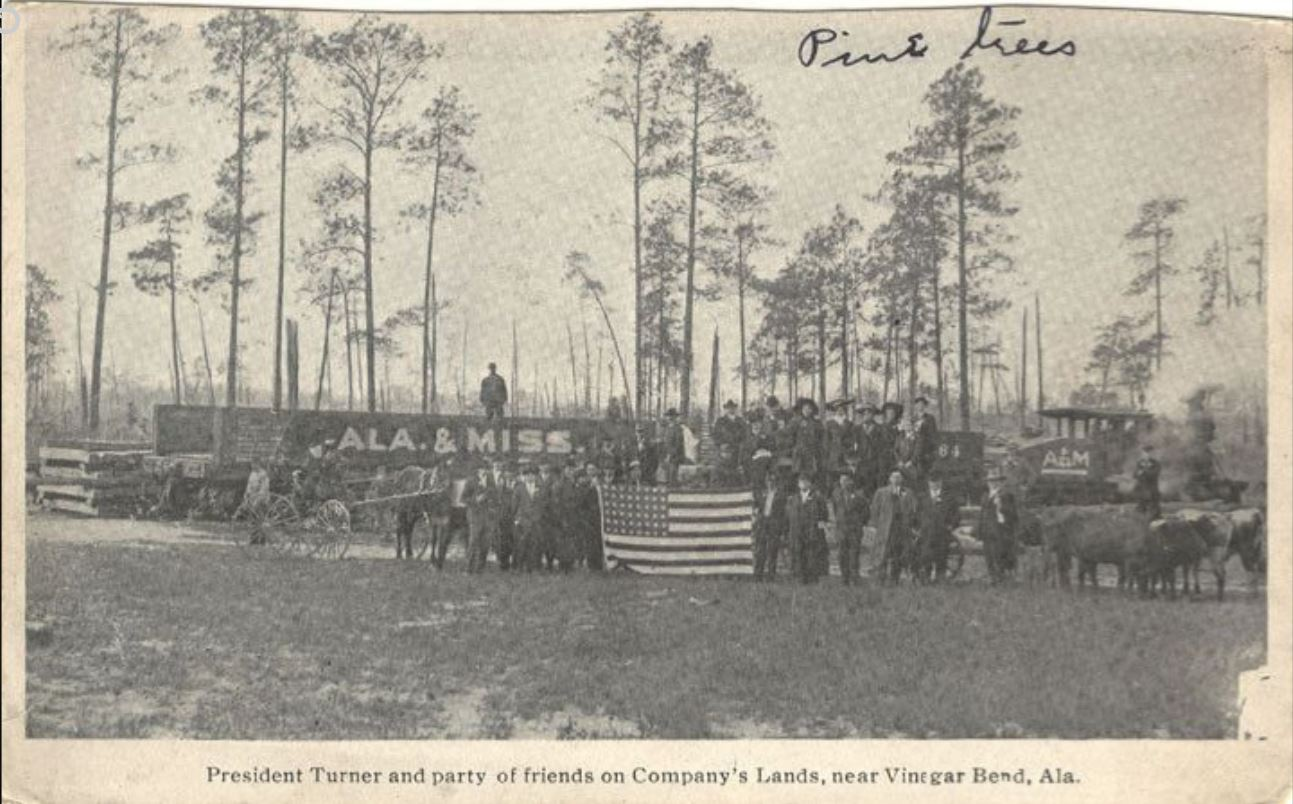
- 1920 scene near Vinegar Bend

- Location of Vinegar Bend in Washington County, Alabama.
- Coordinates: 31°15′25″N 88°22′16″W
- Country: United States
- State: Alabama
- County: Washington

Area
  - Total: 9.47 sq mi (24.54 km^{2})
  - Land: 9.45 sq mi (24.48 km^{2})
  - Water: 0.019 sq mi (0.05 km^{2})
- Elevation: 259 ft (79 m)

Population (2020)
  - Total: 178
  - Density: 18.8/sq mi (7.27/km^{2})
- Time zone: UTC-6 (Central (CST))
  - Summer (DST): UTC-5 (CDT)
- ZIP code: 36584
- Area code: 251
- GNIS feature ID: 2628608

Vinegar Bend is an unincorporated census-designated place in Washington County, Alabama, United States. Vinegar Bend is 15 miles (24 km) south-southwest of Chatom. As of the 2020 census, Vinegar Bend had a population of 178. Vinegar Bend had a post office with ZIP code 36584 until it was closed July 1, 2010. When the bridge on the "main" road into Vinegar Bend was closed for repairs, the USPS closed the post office for good.

== History ==
By 1854, the Mobile and Ohio Railroad had laid track here. A station with the name Vinegar Bend appeared in the Company's official railway guide as early as 1904.

There are a number of stories about how Vinegar Bend got its name. One is that it received its name in 1910 when a container holding vinegar burst at the freight station near the river's bend. It has frequently been noted on lists of unusual place names.

Lucius Beebe visited Vinegar Bend in the 1940s and wrote "Vinegar Bend itself is a communal last chapter. Once at the turn of the century, a local ancient told us, it had been a hustling township boasting a huge planing mill, numerous stores and residences and a forty-two-room-hotel. The railroad had owned half a dozen engines, each one smokier and more pyrotechnic than the next, and life had gone on at a giddy pace."

== Demographics ==
Historical population
| Census | Pop. | Note | %± |
|---|---|---|---|
| 2010 | 192 | | — |
| 2020 | 178 | | −7.3% |
U.S. Decennial Census

Vinegar bend was first listed as a census designated place in the 2010 U.S. census.

=== 2020 census ===
Vinegar Bend CDP, Alabama – Racial and ethnic composition Note: the US Census treats Hispanic/Latino as an ethnic category. This table excludes Latinos from the racial categories and assigns them to a separate category. Hispanics/Latinos may be of any race.
| Race / Ethnicity (NH = Non-Hispanic) | Pop 2010 | Pop 2020 | % 2010 | % 2020 |
|---|---|---|---|---|
| White alone (NH) | 29 | 20 | 15.10% | 11.24% |
| Black or African American alone (NH) | 152 | 144 | 79.17% | 80.90% |
| Native American or Alaska Native alone (NH) | 5 | 5 | 2.60% | 2.81% |
| Asian alone (NH) | 1 | 0 | 0.52% | 0.00% |
| Native Hawaiian or Pacific Islander alone (NH) | 0 | 0 | 0.00% | 0.00% |
| Other race alone (NH) | 0 | 0 | 0.00% | 0.00% |
| Mixed race or Multiracial (NH) | 5 | 8 | 2.60% | 4.49% |
| Hispanic or Latino (any race) | 0 | 1 | 0.00% | 0.56% |
| Total | 192 | 178 | 100.00% | 100.00% |

=== 2010 census ===
As of the 2010 United States census, there were 192 people living in the CDP. The racial makeup of the CDP was 79.2% Black, 15.1% White, 2.6% Native American, 0.5% Asian and 2.6% from two or more races.

== Notable person ==
Wilmer "Vinegar Bend" Mizell, Major League Baseball pitcher and U.S. Congressman from North Carolina, was born across the state line in Mississippi, but the family's residence was on the Vinegar Bend mail route, therefore Vinegar Bend was recorded as his birthplace and he was nicknamed for the community.
