= Patriot Rail Company =

Railroad holding company

Patriot Rail Company LLC (Patriot Rail) is a holding company for a number of shortline railroads across the United States.

In June 2012, Patriot Rail was acquired by SteelRiver Infrastructure Partners (SteelRiver). In 2019, SteelRiver sold Patriot Rail to First Sentier Group.

On August 8, 2022, Patriot Rail announced that it was to acquire Pioneer Lines.

== Holdings ==
Patriot Rail has 31 active railroad operations.

- Butte, Anaconda and Pacific Railway
- Columbia and Cowlitz Railway
- Decatur Junction Railway
- Delta Southern Railroad
- DeQueen and Eastern Railroad
- Elkhart & Western Railroad
- Fort Smith Railroad
- Front Range Railroad
- Garden City Western Railway
- Georgia Northeastern Railroad
- Georgia Southern Railway
- Gettysburg & Northern Railroad
- Golden Triangle Railroad
- Indiana Southwestern Railway
- Kendallville Terminal Railway
- Keokuk Junction Railway
- Kingman Terminal Railroad
- Lakeshore Terminal Railroad
- Louisiana and North West Railroad
- Merced County Central Valley Railroad
- Michigan Southern Railroad
- Mississippi Central Railroad
- Napoleon, Defiance & Western Railway
- Pioneer Industrial Railway
- Plymouth & Lincoln Railroad
- Ripley & New Albany Railroad
- Sacramento Valley Railroad
- Salt Lake, Garfield and Western Railway
- Temple and Central Texas Railway
- Tennessee Southern Railroad
- Utah Central Railway
- Vandalia Railroad

== Former holdings ==
- Mississippi and Skuna Valley Railroad. This line was acquired from Weyerhaeuser in 2010, but due to issues about a damaged bridge on a connecting railroad, Patriot filed for abandonment in 2011, and the line has since become a rail-to-trail conversion.
