= Port Bienville Railroad =

The Port Bienville Railroad (reporting mark PBVR) is a class III railroad operating in Bay St. Louis, Mississippi, county seat of Hancock County.

All mainline rail operated by PBVR has 286,000 pound gross-weight-on-rail capability. PBVR can store up to 429 rail cars at any one time. Multi-modal warehouse and trans-load facilities are available. The multi-modal facility is located in the Gulf Coast Foreign Trade Zone (FTZ) #92 within the industrial park. A trans-loading site is available for other prime sites for bulk transfers and storage of product.

PBVR provides daily service to a Class I railroad interchange with CSX Transportation at Ansley, Mississippi. Port Bienville is located 40 miles (64 km) east of New Orleans, Louisiana.

The PBVR provides switching services for various customers within their plants and for moving cars to and from off-plant site storage facilities. PBVR also offers rail car in-transit storage for customers who ship across the Gulf Coast. Its daily service provides great flexibility for storing of future shipments.

The railroad was heavily damaged by Hurricane Katrina in 2005 however repairs were made and PBVR is back in full operation.
