= Luxapalila Valley Railroad =

Overview
- Parent company: Genesee and Wyoming
- Headquarters: Columbus, MS
- Reporting mark: LXVR
- Locale: Mississippi, Alabama
- Dates of operation: 1996–present

Technical
- Track gauge: 4 ft 8 1/2 in (1,435 mm) standard gauge
- Length: 35 miles (56 km)

Other
- Website: Official website

The Luxapalila Valley Railroad (reporting mark LXVR) is a 35 miles (56 km) short line freight railroad that operates between Columbus, Mississippi, and Belk, Alabama. The LXVR interchanges with the Columbus & Greenville, Kansas City Southern and Norfolk Southern at Columbus, MS. Commodities transported include forest products and waste products.

The LXVR was acquired by Genesee & Wyoming in 2008.
