= Mississippi and Skuna Valley Railroad =

Former American railroad

Mississippi & Skuna Valley Railroad
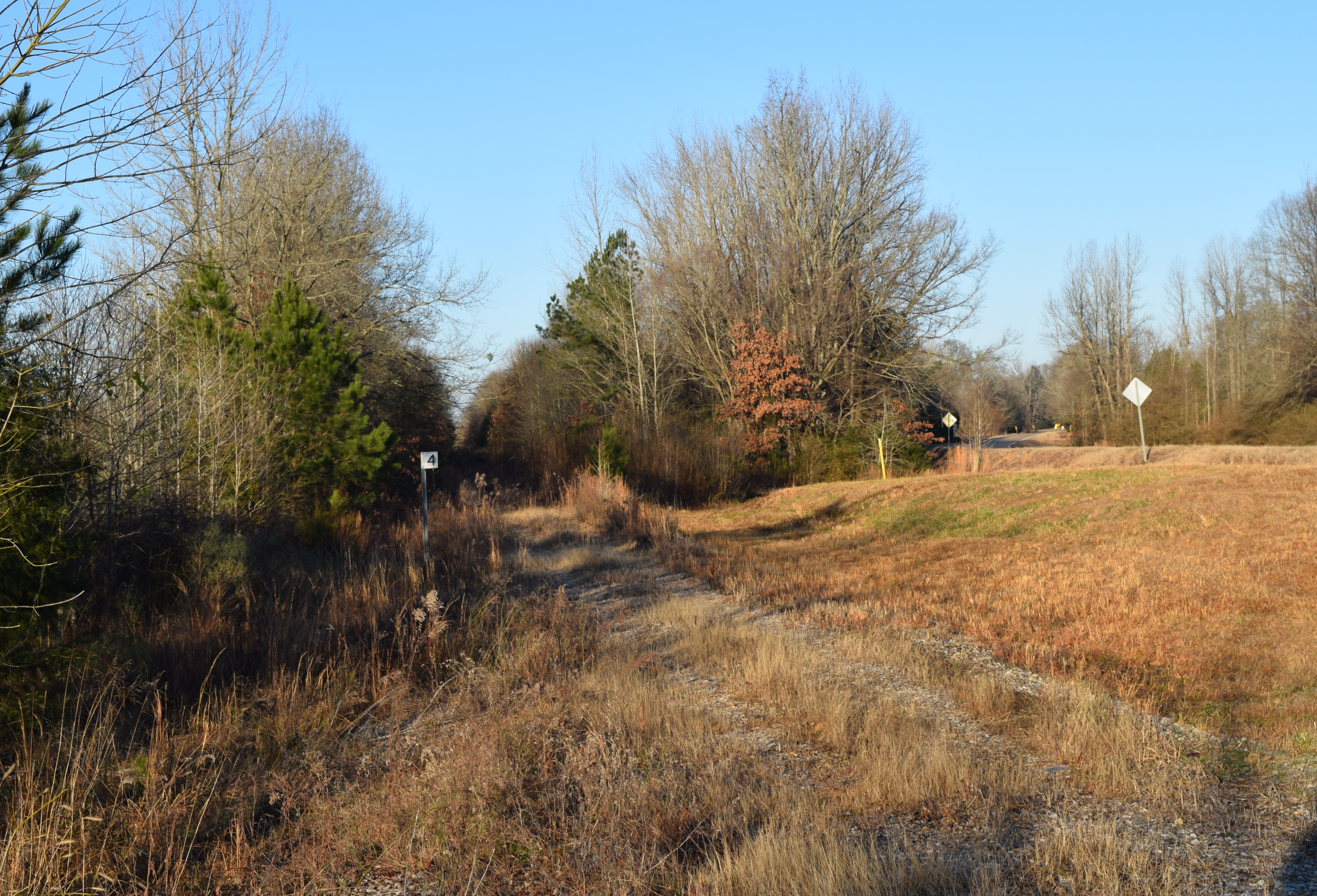
- Right of way in 2019

Overview
- Headquarters: Bruce, Mississippi
- Reporting mark: MSV
- Dates of operation: 1925–2008

Technical
- Track gauge: 4 ft 8 1/2 in (1,435 mm) standard gauge
- Length: 22.0 miles (35.4 km)

The Mississippi & Skuna Valley Railroad (MSV) was a 22-mile a shortline railroad that operated in Mississippi from 1925 to 2008.

== History ==
The railroad was on incorporated on June 1, 1925 primarily to serve the E.L. Bruce Company hardwood mill in Bruce, Mississippi. It ran from a connection with the Illinois Central Railroad (later Canadian National) south of Coffeeville, Mississippi to Bruce. Lumber products made up the majority of its traffic.

Operations on the MSV were forced to cease in 2008 due to a bridge being damaged on its connecting railroad, which was now owned by Canadian National.

In August 2010 the Patriot Rail Corporation purchased the line but was unable to operate it due to the damaged bridge on its connecting railroad.

== Abandonment ==
In November 2011, Patriot Rail filed a petition to abandon the track, and in 2012 donated the right of way to Calhoun and Yalobusha counties to become a rail trail.
