= Pearl River Valley Railroad =

The Pearl River Valley Railroad (reporting mark PRV) was a shortline railroad that ran from Nicholson to Picayune, Mississippi. It began operation in 1917 when it purchased 10 miles of track from Crosby & Rowlands, including parts of the abandoned Cybur, Gulf, and Northwestern Railroad. Additional sections were then built, extending the line 17.3 miles north to Anderson. It eventually went on to operate 35 miles of railroad. It was abandoned in 2007.
