= Columbus and Greenville Railway =

Railway company in Mississippi, US

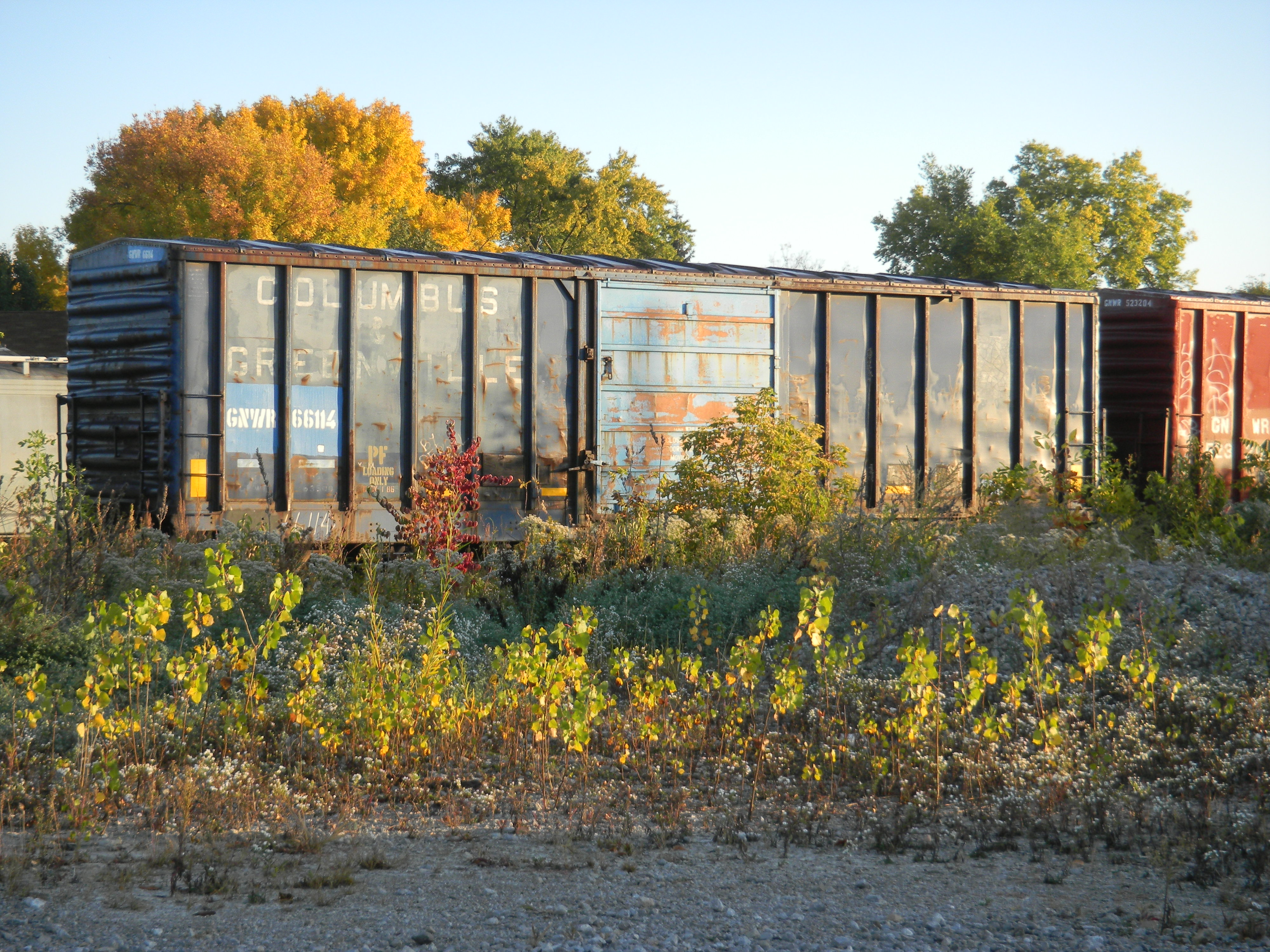
- Former Columbus and Greenville Railway boxcar on the CRANDIC at Cedar Rapids, Iowa

Overview
- Parent company: Genesee and Wyoming Inc.
- Headquarters: Columbus, Mississippi
- Reporting mark: CAGY
- Locale: Mississippi
- Dates of operation: 1975–present
- Predecessor: Illinois Central Gulf Railroad

Technical
- Track gauge: 4 ft 8 1/2 in (1,435 mm) standard gauge
- Length: 114 miles (183 km)

Other
- Website: https://www.gwrr.com/cagy/

The Columbus and Greenville Railway (reporting mark CAGY) was founded in 1974 and began operations in 1975 over divested Illinois Central Gulf Railroad trackage across the state of Mississippi. Its terminals, as the name implies, are Columbus and Greenville, Mississippi.

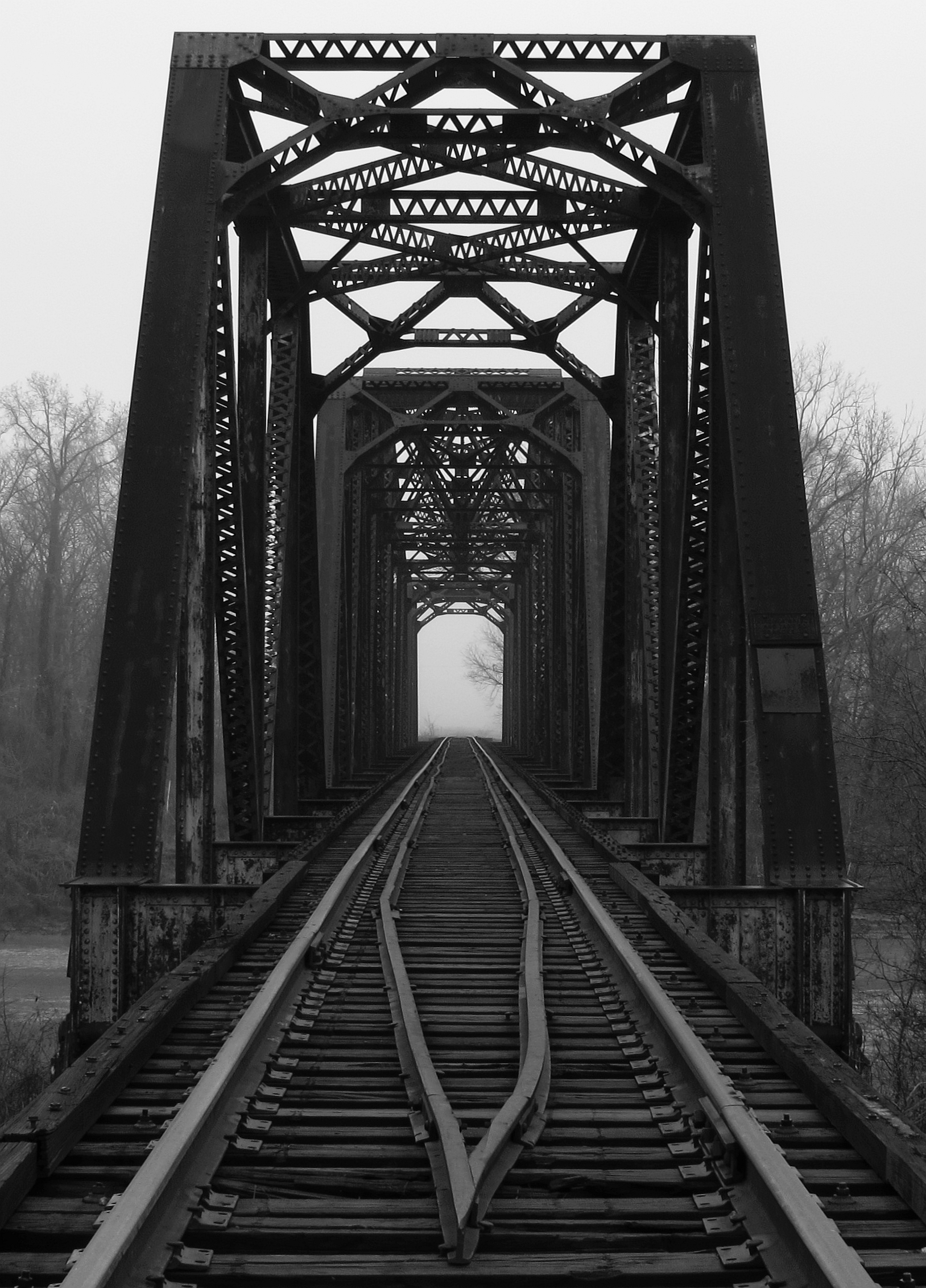
Columbus and Greenville Railway bridge over Yazoo River

In 2001, CAGY suspended service over 89.5 miles (144 km) of track between West Point and Greenwood due to a washout. This action split the line in two. The western section operates between Greenville and Greenwood with an interchange with Canadian National in Greenwood. The eastern section operates the remaining trackage from West Point onwards.

The company once specialized in transporting wood and paper products to and from local factories. The company's traffic base has expanded to include bricks, plastic products, feed grains for catfish and swine, finished and raw steel, and biodiesel as well as cotton and rice products. The company runs six trains a day, two between Greenwood and Greenville, two out of Columbus and two at the Severcorr steel mill between Columbus and Artesia.

The majority owner of the Columbus and Greenville is CAGY Industries, which also owns the Luxapalila Valley Railroad and the Chattooga and Chickamauga Railway.

CAGY Industries was purchased by Genesee & Wyoming Inc. in June, 2008. GWRR is still operating the sections of rail between Greenville and Greenwood, and between West Point and Columbus.

== Original company ==
The Columbus and Greenville Railway (reporting mark C&G) was a railway in Mississippi. It was formed by the sale of the Southern Railway operated Southern Railway in Mississippi, to local interests. In January 1952, the CAGY retired its last steam locomotive, Baldwin 4-6-0 Ten-Wheeler #304 built in 1904. It continued independent operations until 1972 when it was bought by the Illinois Central Gulf Railroad. Baldwin locomotive #606 "City of Moorhead", formerly of the Columbus and Greenville Railway, is on display at the Illinois Railway Museum.

== C&G Rail Trail Coalition ==
The C&G Rail Trail Coalition was formed in early 2008 with the goal of converting the abandoned section between Greenwood and West Point into a rail trail. Their effort was almost immediately put on hold when the line was purchased by Genesee & Wyoming Inc., who had no interest in abandoning the line at that point. Efforts restarted when GWRR approached the Coalition in February, 2022.

As of April, 2023, the Coalition is being assisted by the Mississippi Hills National Heritage Area and various municipalities along the route. They are working to acquire funding and develop preliminary plans for purchasing and converting the abandoned line to a usable trail. Some rural landowners crossed by the rail line are fighting the development.
