= List of Indiana railroads =

The following railroads operate in the U.S. state of Indiana.

== Common freight carriers ==
- Canadian National Railway (CN) through 3 subsidiaries:
  - Wisconsin Central (WC)
  - Elgin, Joliet and Eastern Railway - now part of Wisconsin Central(EJE)
  - Grand Trunk Western Railroad (GTW)
  - Illinois Central Railroad (IC)
- Canadian Pacific Railway (CP) through 1 subsidiary:
  - Soo Line Railroad (SOO)
- Central Indiana and Western Railroad (CEIW)
- Central Railroad of Indiana (CIND)
- Central Railroad of Indianapolis (CERA)
- Chesapeake and Indiana Railroad (CKIN)
- Chicago, Fort Wayne and Eastern Railroad (CFE)
- Chicago South Shore and South Bend Railroad (CSS)
- C&NC Railroad (CNUR)
- CSX Corporation (CSX) through 2 subsidiaries:
  - CSX Transportation (CSXT)
  - Baltimore and Ohio Chicago Terminal Railroad (BOCT)
- Dubois County Railroad (DCRR)
- Elkhart and Western Railroad (EWR)
- Elkhart and Western Railway (EWRY)
  - Operates the Fulton County Railroad (FC)
- Evansville Western Railway (EVWR)
- Gary Railway (GRW)
- Grand Elk Railroad (GDLK)
- Honey Creek Railroad (HCRR)
- Hoosier Southern Railroad (HOS)
- Indian Creek Railroad (ICRK)
- Indiana Rail Road (INRD)
- Indiana Eastern Railroad (IERR)
- Indiana Harbor Belt Railroad (IHB)
- Indiana Northeastern Railroad (IN)
- Indiana and Ohio Railway (IORY)
- Indiana Southern Railroad (ISRR)
- Indiana Southwestern Railway (ISW)
- Kankakee, Beaverville and Southern Railroad (KBSR)
  - Also operates the Bee Line Railroad (BLEX)
- Kendallville Terminal Railway (KTR)
- Lake Michigan and Indiana Railroad (LMIC)
- Landisville Terminal & Transfer Company (LVTT)
- Louisville and Indiana Railroad (LIRC)
- Lucas Oil Rail Line (LORL)
- City of Madison Port Authority:
  - Operates the Madison Railroad (CMPA)
- MG Rail (MGRI)
- Norfolk Southern Corporation through 1 subsidiary:
  - Norfolk Southern Railway (NS)
- Ohio Valley Railroad (OVR)
- R.J. Corman Railroad/Western Ohio Lines (RJCW)
- R.J. Corman Railroad/St Mary's Lines (RJSM)
- South Chicago and Indiana Harbor Railway (SCIH)
- Southern Indiana Railway (SIND)
- Southwind Shortline Railway (SWRX)
- Squaw Creek Southern Railroad (SCS)
- Toledo, Peoria and Western Railway (TPW)
- U S Rail Corporation (USRP):
  - Operates the Kokomo Grain Company
  - Operates the Winamac Southern Railway (WSRY)
- Vermilion Valley Railroad (VVRR)
- Wabash Central Railroad (WBCR)

== Private freight carriers ==
- BP
- City of Auburn Port Authority
- Steel Dynamics
- Yankeetown Docks Corporation (YDCX)

== Passenger carriers ==
- Amtrak (AMTK)
- Carthage, Knightstown and Shirley Railroad (CKSI)
- Indiana Railway Museum
- Nickel Plate Express
  - Operates the Hoosier Heritage Port Authority (HHPA)
- Northern Indiana Commuter Transportation District:
  - Operates the South Shore Line
- Whitewater Valley Railroad

== Defunct railroads ==
Name	Mark	System (Note: This is one or more of the Class I railroads that the railroad became part of, if any.)	From	To	Successor	Notes
A&R Line, Inc.	ARE		1995			Still exists as a lessor of Toledo, Peoria and Western Railway
Algers, Winslow and Western Railway	AWW		1927	2007	Norfolk Southern Railway	
American Central Railway		NKP	1859	1864	Cleveland, Fort Wayne and Chicago Railroad	
Anderson Belt Railway		PRR	1891	1917	Pittsburgh, Cincinnati, Chicago and St. Louis Railroad	
Anderson, Lebanon and St. Louis Railway		NYC/ PRR	1871	1882	Cleveland, Indiana and St. Louis Railway	
Atchison, Topeka and Santa Fe Railway	ATSF		1983	1989	Toledo, Peoria and Western Railway	
Attica, Covington and Southern Railway		WAB	1879	1903	Wabash Railroad	
Attica and Terre Haute Railroad		C&EI	1860	1872	Chicago, Danville and Vincennes Railroad	
Auburn and Eel River Valley Railroad		PRR	1853	1853	Logansport and Northern Indiana Railroad	
Baltimore and Ohio Railroad	B&O, BO	B&O	1874	1987	Chesapeake and Ohio Railway	
Baltimore and Ohio and Chicago Railroad		B&O	1876	1949	Baltimore and Ohio Railroad	
Baltimore and Ohio Southwestern Railroad		B&O	1899	1949	Baltimore and Ohio Railroad	
Baltimore and Ohio Southwestern Railway		B&O	1893	1899	Cincinnati, Louisville and Vincennes Railway	
Baltimore, Pittsburgh and Chicago Railway		B&O	1872	1876	Baltimore and Ohio and Chicago Railroad	
Bedford Belt Railway		MILW	1892	1910	Chicago, Terre Haute and Southeastern Railway	
Bedford and Bloomfield Railroad		MON	1883	1897	Chicago, Indianapolis and Louisville Railway	
Bedford, Springville, Owensburg and Bloomfield Railroad		MON	1874	1883	Bedford and Bloomfield Railroad	
Bedford Stone Railway			1901	1917	N/A	
Bedford and Wallner Railroad		MON	1905	1927	Chicago, Indianapolis and Louisville Railway	
Bellefontaine Railway		NYC	1864	1868	Cleveland, Columbus, Cincinnati and Indianapolis Railway	
Belt Railroad of Indianapolis		NYC/ PRR	1877	1881	Belt Railroad and Stockyard Company	
Belt Railroad and Stockyard Company		NYC/ PRR	1881	1883	Belt Railroad and Stock Yards Company	
Belt Railroad and Stock Yards Company		NYC/ PRR	1883			
Benton Central Railroad			1987	1989	Kankakee, Beaverville and Southern Railroad	
Bloomfield Railroad		IC, MON	1874	1886	Bedford and Bloomfield Railroad, Indiana and Illinois Southern Railroad	
Bloomington Southern Railroad		IC	1906	1946	Illinois Central Railroad	
Bluffton, Kokomo and Southwestern Railroad		NKP	1886	1886	Toledo, St. Louis and Kansas City Railroad	
Borinstein Railroad	BRRC		1985	early 1990s	N/A	
Buffalo and Mississippi Railroad		NYC	1835	1837	Northern Indiana Railroad	
Butler and Detroit Railroad		WAB	1880	1881	Detroit, Butler and St. Louis Railroad	
Cairo and Vincennes Railroad		NYC	1872	1880	Cairo and Vincennes Railway	
Cairo and Vincennes Railway		NYC	1880	1881	Wabash, St. Louis and Pacific Railway	
Cairo, Vincennes and Chicago Railway		NYC	1889	1913	Cleveland, Cincinnati, Chicago and St. Louis Railway	
Calumet River Railway		B&O	1886	1887	Chicago and Calumet Terminal Railway	
Canada and St. Louis Railway		NYC	1887	1889	Sturgis, Goshen and St. Louis Railway	
Carthage, Knightstown and Shirley Railroad	CKSI		1987	1988	N/A	Continued as a tourist railroad
Central Indiana Railway	CIND	NYC/ PRR	1903	1976	Consolidated Rail Corporation	
Central Railroad of Indianapolis		NYC	1899		N/A	
Chesapeake and Ohio Railway	C&O, CO	C&O	1921	1987	CSX Transportation	
Chesapeake and Ohio Railway of Indiana		C&O	1910	1934	Chesapeake and Ohio Railway	
Chicago and Atlantic Railway		ERIE	1873	1890	Chicago and Erie Railroad	
Chicago, Attica and Southern Railroad			1922	1946	N/A	
Chicago and Block Coal Railroad		C&EI	1879	1883	Chicago and Great Southern Railway	
Chicago and Calumet Terminal Railway		B&O	1887	1898	Chicago Terminal Transfer Railroad	
Chicago and Canada Southern Railway			1871	1888	N/A	Sold at foreclosure; no property in Indiana
Chicago and Cincinnati Railroad		C&O	1902	1902	Chicago, Cincinnati and Louisville Railroad	
Chicago and Cincinnati Railroad		PRR	1857	1865	Chicago and Great Eastern Railway	
Chicago, Cincinnati and Louisville Railroad		C&O	1903	1910	Chesapeake and Ohio Railway of Indiana	
Chicago, Cincinnati and Louisville Railroad		NKP	1866	1886	Lake Erie and Western Railroad	
Chicago, Continental and Baltimore Railway		ERIE	1871	1873	Chicago and Atlantic Railway	
Chicago, Danville and Vincennes Railroad		C&EI	1872	1877	State Line and Covington Railroad	
Chicago and Dyer Railroad		MON	1880	1880	Chicago and Indianapolis Air Line Railway	
Chicago and Eastern Illinois Railroad	C&EI, CEI	C&EI	1940	1969	Louisville and Nashville Railroad	
Chicago and Eastern Illinois Railroad		C&EI	1877	1922	Chicago and Eastern Illinois Railway	
Chicago and Eastern Illinois Railway		C&EI	1922	1940	Chicago and Eastern Illinois Railroad	
Chicago and Erie Railroad		ERIE	1890	1941	Erie Railroad	
Chicago and Grand Trunk Railway		GTW	1880	1900	Indiana and Illinois Railway	
Chicago and Great Eastern Railway		PRR	1863	1868	Columbus, Chicago and Indiana Central Railway	
Chicago and Great Southern Railway		C&EI	1881	1886	Indiana Railway	
Chicago, Hammond and Western Railroad		NYC	1896	1898	Chicago Junction Railway	
Chicago Heights and Northern Railway		EJE	1897	1897	Elgin, Joliet and Eastern Railway	
Chicago and Indiana Railroad	CINR		1979	1979	Tippecanoe Railroad	
Chicago and Indiana Coal Railway		C&EI	1885	1894	Chicago and Eastern Illinois Railroad	
Chicago, Indiana and Eastern Railway		PRR	1893	1917	Pittsburgh, Cincinnati, Chicago and St. Louis Railroad	
Chicago, Indiana and Southern Railroad		NYC	1906	1914	New York Central Railroad	
Chicago and Indianapolis Air Line Railway		MON	1880	1881	Louisville, New Albany and Chicago Railway	
Chicago, Indianapolis and Louisville Railway	CI&L, CIL	MON	1897	1956	Monon Railroad	
Chicago and Indianapolis Terminal Company		MON	1896	1897	Chicago, Indianapolis and Louisville Railway	
Chicago Junction Railway		NYC	1898	1907	Indiana Harbor Belt Railroad	
Chicago and Lake Huron Railroad		GTW	1873	1879	Indiana Railway	
Chicago, Lake Shore and Eastern Railway		EJE	1895	1938	Elgin, Joliet and Eastern Railway	
Chicago, Milwaukee and St. Paul Railway		MILW	1921	1928	Chicago, Milwaukee, St. Paul and Pacific Railroad	
Chicago, Milwaukee, St. Paul and Pacific Railroad	MILW	MILW	1928	1985	The Milwaukee Road, Inc.	
Chicago, St. Louis and New Orleans Railroad		IC	1898	1951	Illinois Central Railroad	
Chicago, St. Louis and Pittsburgh Railroad		PRR	1883	1890	Pittsburgh, Cincinnati, Chicago and St. Louis Railway	
Chicago and South Eastern Railway		NYC/ PRR	1891	1903	Central Indiana Railway	
Chicago South Shore and South Bend Railroad	CSS		1925			Electric until 1981
Chicago and State Line Extension Railway		GTW	1879	1879	North Western Grand Trunk Railway	
Chicago Terminal Transfer Railroad		B&O	1897	1910	Baltimore and Ohio Chicago Terminal Railroad	
Chicago, Terre Haute and Southeastern Railway	CTSE	MILW	1910	1948	Chicago, Milwaukee, St. Paul and Pacific Railroad	
Chicago and Wabash Valley Railroad		MON	1898	1900	Chicago and Wabash Valley Railway	
Chicago and Wabash Valley Railway		MON	1900	1916	Chicago, Indianapolis and Louisville Railway	
Chicago and West Michigan Railway		PM	1881	1917	Pere Marquette Railroad	
Cincinnati and Bedford Railway		B&O	1889	1893	Baltimore and Ohio Southwestern Railway	
Cincinnati, Bluffton and Chicago Railroad			1903	1917	N/A	
Cincinnati, Cambridge and Chicago Short Line Railway		NKP	1853	1854	Cincinnati and Chicago Railroad	
Cincinnati and Chicago Railroad		NKP, PRR	1854	1860	Cincinnati and Chicago Air-Line Railroad, Cincinnati, Connersville and Muncie Railroad, Connersville and New Castle Junction Railroad	
Cincinnati and Chicago Air-Line Railroad		PRR	1860	1865	Chicago and Great Eastern Railway	
Cincinnati, Connersville and Muncie Railroad		NKP	1868	1869	Fort Wayne, Muncie and Cincinnati Railroad	
Cincinnati, Findlay and Fort Wayne Railway			1903	1919	N/A	
Cincinnati and Fort Wayne Railroad		PRR	1853	1866	Cincinnati, Richmond and Fort Wayne Railroad	
Cincinnati, Hamilton and Dayton Railway		B&O	1895	1917	Baltimore and Ohio Railroad	Leased the Cincinnati, Findlay and Fort Wayne Railway and Cincinnati, Indianapolis and Western Railway
Cincinnati, Hamilton and Indianapolis Railroad		B&O	1872	1902	Cincinnati, Indianapolis and Western Railway	
Cincinnati, Indianapolis, St. Louis and Chicago Railway		NYC	1880	1889	Cleveland, Cincinnati, Chicago and St. Louis Railway	
Cincinnati, Indianapolis and Western Railroad	CIWN	B&O	1915	1990	CSX Transportation	
Cincinnati, Indianapolis and Western Railway		B&O	1902	1915	Cincinnati, Indianapolis and Western Railroad	
Cincinnati, Lafayette and Chicago Railroad		NYC	1870	1938	Cleveland, Cincinnati, Chicago and St. Louis Railway	
Cincinnati, Logansport and Chicago Railway		PRR	1853	1854	Cincinnati and Chicago Railroad	
Cincinnati, Louisville and Vincennes Railway		B&O	1899	1899	Baltimore and Ohio Southwestern Railroad	
Cincinnati and Martinsville Railroad		NYC	1865	1877	Fairland, Franklin and Martinsville Railroad	
Cincinnati, New Castle and Michigan Railroad		NKP	1853	1854	Cincinnati and Chicago Railroad	
Cincinnati, Peru and Chicago Railway		NKP	1853	1865	Chicago, Cincinnati and Louisville Railroad	
Cincinnati and Richmond Railroad		PRR	1890	1890	Pittsburgh, Cincinnati, Chicago and St. Louis Railway	
Cincinnati, Richmond and Fort Wayne Railroad		PRR	1866	1927	Pittsburgh, Cincinnati, Chicago and St. Louis Railroad	
Cincinnati, Richmond and Muncie Railroad		C&O	1900	1903	Chicago, Cincinnati and Louisville Railroad	
Cincinnati, Rockport and Southwestern Railway		SOU	1872	1880	Evansville, Rockport and Eastern Railway	
Cincinnati and Southern Ohio River Railway		NYC	1887	1915	Cleveland, Cincinnati, Chicago and St. Louis Railway	
Cincinnati and Southwestern Railway		SOU	1871	1872	Cincinnati, Rockport and Southwestern Railway	
Cincinnati and Terre Haute Railway		NYC	1871	1877	Columbus, Hope and Greensburg Railroad, Terre Haute and Southeastern Railroad	
Cincinnati, Wabash and Michigan Railway		NYC	1871	1915	Cleveland, Cincinnati, Chicago and St. Louis Railway	
Cleveland, Cincinnati, Chicago and St. Louis Railway		NYC	1889	1976	Consolidated Rail Corporation	
Cleveland, Columbus, Cincinnati and Indianapolis Railway		NYC	1868	1889	Cleveland, Cincinnati, Chicago and St. Louis Railway	
Cleveland, Fort Wayne and Chicago Railroad		NKP	1865	1879	Ohio Railway	
Cleveland, Indiana and St. Louis Railway		NYC/ PRR	1882	1885	Midland Railway	
Columbus, Chicago and Indiana Central Railway		PRR	1868	1883	Chicago, St. Louis and Pittsburgh Railroad	
Columbus, Hope and Greensburg Railroad		NYC	1882	1938	Cleveland, Cincinnati, Chicago and St. Louis Railway	
Columbus and Indiana Central Railway		PRR	1867	1868	Columbus, Chicago and Indiana Central Railway	
Columbus and Indianapolis Central Railway		PRR	1864	1867	Columbus and Indiana Central Railway	
Columbus and Shelby Railroad		PRR	1852	1881	Jeffersonville, Madison and Indianapolis Railroad	
Connersville and New Castle Junction Railroad		NKP	1863	1868	Cincinnati, Connersville and Muncie Railroad	
Consolidated Rail Corporation	CR		1976	1999	CSX Transportation, Norfolk Southern Railway	
Cook Transit Company			1947	1956	N/A	
Crawfordsville and Rockville Railroad		PRR	1869	1871	Logansport, Crawfordsville and South Western Railway	
Crawfordsville and Wabash Railroad		MON	1846	1852	New Albany and Salem Railroad	
Dayton and Chicago Railway			1886	1887	Dayton, Fort Wayne and Chicago Railway	
Dayton, Fort Wayne and Chicago Railway			1887	1891	N/A	Sold at foreclosure; no property in Indiana
Dayton and Union Railroad		B&O	1863	1989	CSX Transportation	
Decatur and Ohio Railway			1886	1886	Dayton and Chicago Railway	
Delphos, Bluffton and Frankfort Railroad		NKP	1877	1879	Toledo, Delphos and Burlington Railroad	
Detroit, Butler and St. Louis Railroad		WAB	1881	1881	Wabash, St. Louis and Pacific Railway	
Detroit, Eel River and Illinois Railroad		PRR	1868	1877	Eel River Railroad	
Detroit, Logansport and St. Louis Railroad		PRR	1869	1870	Detroit, Eel River and Illinois Railroad	
Dinwiddie and Gary Railway		MON		1909	Chicago and Wabash Valley Railway	
East Chicago Belt Railroad		NYC	1896	1907	Indiana Harbor Belt Railroad	
Eaton and Hamilton Railroad		PRR	1854	1862	Richmond and Miami Railway	
Eel River Railroad		PRR	1877	1897	Logansport and Toledo Railway	
Elkhart and Western Railroad		NYC	1888	1915	New York Central Railroad	
Elwood, Anderson and Lapelle Railroad			1897	1929	N/A	
Erie Railroad	ERIE	ERIE	1941	1960	Erie–Lackawanna Railroad	
Erie–Lackawanna Railroad	EL		1960	1968	Erie Lackawanna Railway	
Erie Lackawanna Railway	EL		1968	1976	Consolidated Rail Corporation	
Erie Western Railway	ERES		1977	1979	Chicago and Indiana Railroad	
Evansville Railways Company			1909	1919	Evansville and Ohio Valley Railway	Operated electric passenger and steam freight trains
Evansville Belt Railway		C&EI	1881	1911	Chicago and Eastern Illinois Railroad	
Evansville, Carmi and Paducah Railroad		L&N	1869	1871	St. Louis and Southeastern Railway	
Evansville and Crawfordsville Railroad		C&EI	1853	1877	Evansville and Terre Haute Railroad	
Evansville and Eastern Electric Railway			1904	1909	Evansville Railways Company	Operated electric passenger and steam freight trains
Evansville and Illinois Railroad		C&EI	1849	1853	Evansville and Crawfordsville Railroad	
Evansville and Indianapolis Railroad	E&I	NYC	1869	1920	Evansville, Indianapolis and Terre Haute Railway	
Evansville, Indianapolis and Cleveland Straight Line Railroad		NYC	1853	1869	Evansville and Indianapolis Railroad	
Evansville, Indianapolis and Terre Haute Railway		NYC	1920	1938	Cleveland, Cincinnati, Chicago and St. Louis Railway	
Evansville Local Trade Railroad		SOU	1879	1880	Evansville, Rockport and Eastern Railway	
Evansville, Mount Carmel and Northern Railway		NYC	1906	1938	Cleveland, Cincinnati, Chicago and St. Louis Railway	
Evansville and New Harmony Railway		IC	1881	1903	Illinois Central Railroad	
Evansville and Ohio Valley Railway			1918	1946	N/A	Operated electric passenger and steam freight trains
Evansville, Owensboro and Nashville Railroad			1873	1877	N/A	Sold at foreclosure; no property in Indiana
Evansville and Peoria Railway		IC	1880	1880	Peoria, Decatur and Evansville Railway	
Evansville and Richmond Railroad		MILW	1886	1897	Evansville and Richmond Railway	
Evansville and Richmond Railway		MILW	1897	1897	Southern Indiana Railway	
Evansville, Rockport and Eastern Railway		SOU	1880	1881	Louisville, New Albany and St. Louis Railway	
Evansville Suburban and Newburgh Railway			1888	1947	Cook Transit Company	Operated electric passenger and steam freight trains
Evansville Terminal Company	EVT		1996	2000	Indiana Southwestern Railway	
Evansville Terminal Railway			1908	1909	Evansville Railways Company	Operated electric passenger and steam freight trains
Evansville and Terre Haute Railroad		C&EI	1877	1911	Chicago and Eastern Illinois Railroad	
Evansville, Terre Haute and Chicago Railway		C&EI	1869	1899	Chicago and Eastern Illinois Railroad	
Evansville, Washington and Brazil Railroad		NYC	1883	1885	Evansville and Indianapolis Railroad	
Evansville, Washington and Worthington Railroad		NYC	1878	1880	Indianapolis and Evansville Railroad	
Fairland, Franklin and Martinsville Railroad		NYC	1877	1915	Cleveland, Cincinnati, Chicago and St. Louis Railway	
Ferdinand Railroad	FRDN		1911	1987	Ferdinand and Huntingburg Railroad	
Ferdinand Railway			1906	1911	Ferdinand Railroad	
Ferdinand and Huntingburg Railroad	FHRR		1987	1991	N/A	
Findlay, Fort Wayne and Western Railroad			1890	1894	Fort Wayne and Eastern Railway	
Findlay, Fort Wayne and Western Railway			1894	1903	Cincinnati, Findlay and Fort Wayne Railway	
Fort Wayne and Chicago Railroad		PRR	1852	1856	Pittsburgh, Fort Wayne and Chicago Railroad	
Fort Wayne, Cincinnati and Louisville Railroad		NKP	1881	1890	Lake Erie and Western Railroad	
Fort Wayne and Detroit Railroad		WAB	1901	1901	Wabash Railroad	
Fort Wayne and Eastern Railway			1894	1894	Findlay, Fort Wayne and Western Railway	
Fort Wayne and Findlay Railroad			1890	1890	Findlay, Fort Wayne and Western Railroad	
Fort Wayne and Illinois Railroad		NKP	1887	1887	New York, Chicago and St. Louis Railroad	
Fort Wayne and Jackson Railroad		NYC	1880	1976	Consolidated Rail Corporation, Hillsdale County Railway	
Fort Wayne, Jackson and Saginaw Railroad		NYC	1868	1879	Fort Wayne and Jackson Railroad	
Fort Wayne, Muncie and Cincinnati Railroad		NKP	1869	1881	Fort Wayne, Cincinnati and Louisville Railroad	
Fort Wayne, Muncie and Cincinnati Railway		NKP	1868	1869	Fort Wayne, Muncie and Cincinnati Railroad	
Fort Wayne and Southern Railroad		B&O, NKP	1849	1868	Fort Wayne, Muncie and Cincinnati Railway, Ohio and Mississippi Railway	
Fort Wayne, Terre Haute and Southwestern Railroad		NYC/ PRR	1890	1901	Chicago and South Eastern Railway	
Fort Wayne Union Railway	FWU	NKP/ NYC/ PRR/ WAB	1922			
Frankfort and Crawfordsville Railroad		PRR	1869	1871	Logansport, Crawfordsville and South Western Railway	
Frankfort and Kokomo Railroad		NKP	1870	1881	Toledo, Cincinnati and St. Louis Railroad	
Frankfort and State Line Railroad		NKP	1879	1881	Toledo, Cincinnati and St. Louis Railroad	
Frankfort, St. Louis and Toledo Railroad		NKP	1876	1882	Toledo, Cincinnati and St. Louis Railroad	
Franklin and Martinsville Railroad		NYC	1859	1865	Cincinnati and Martinsville Railroad	
Fulton County Railroad			1981	1985	N/A	
Gary and Western Railway		NYC	1906	1928	New York Central Railroad	
Grand Rapids and Fort Wayne Railroad		PRR	1857	1857	Grand Rapids and Indiana Railroad	
Grand Rapids and Indiana Railroad		PRR	1854	1896	Grand Rapids and Indiana Railway	
Grand Rapids and Indiana Railway		PRR	1896	1954	Penndel Company	
Grand Rapids, Wabash and Cincinnati Railroad		NYC	1869	1871	Cincinnati, Wabash and Michigan Railway	
Grand Trunk Railway of Northern Indiana		NYC	1868	1868	Michigan Air Line Railroad	
Grand Trunk Western Railway		GTW	1900	1928	Grand Trunk Western Railroad	
Greenville and Miami Railroad		B&O	1846	1862	Dayton and Union Railroad	
Griffith and Northern Railway		EJE	1899	1931	Elgin, Joliet and Eastern Railway	
Hammond Belt Railway		C&O	1906		N/A	
Hammond and Blue Island Railroad		NYC	1895	1896	Chicago, Hammond and Western Railroad	
Hammond and Lake Michigan Railway		B&O	1887	1887	Chicago and Calumet Terminal Railway	
Havana, Rantoul and Eastern Railroad		IC	1878	1887	Lebanon and Western Railroad	
Henderson Bridge Company		L&N	1881	1906	Henderson Bridge and Railroad Company	
Henderson Bridge and Railroad Company		L&N	1906	1906	Louisville and Nashville Railroad	
Hillsdale County Railway	HCRC		1976	1992	Indiana Northeastern Railroad	
Hope and Greensburg Railroad		NYC	1880	1882	Columbus, Hope and Greensburg Railroad	
Huntingburg, Tell City and Cannelton Railroad		SOU	1885	1889	Louisville, Evansville and St. Louis Consolidated Railroad	
Indiana Block Coal Railroad		C&EI	1878	1899	Chicago and Eastern Illinois Railroad	
Illinois Central Railroad	IC	IC	1886	1972	Illinois Central Gulf Railroad	
Illinois Central Gulf Railroad	ICG		1972	1986	Indiana Rail Road, Indiana Hi-Rail Corporation	
Illinois and Indiana Railroad		IC	1899	1906	Indianapolis Southern Railroad	
Indiana Railway		NYC	1887	1887	Indiana and Western Railway	
Indiana Railway		C&EI	1886	1886	Chicago and Indiana Coal Railway	
Indiana Railway		GTW	1880	1880	Chicago and Grand Trunk Railway	
Indiana, Bloomington and Western Railway		NYC	1879	1887	Indiana Railway	
Indiana Central Railway		PRR	1848	1864	Columbus and Indianapolis Central Railway	
Indiana and Chicago Railway		C&EI	1880	1881	Chicago and Great Southern Railway	
Indiana, Decatur and Western Railway		B&O	1894	1902	Cincinnati, Indianapolis and Western Railway	
Indiana Eastern Railroad and Transportation Company			1979	1984	Indiana Midland Railway	
Indiana Harbor Railroad		NYC	1901	1906	Chicago, Indiana and Southern Railroad	
Indiana Hi-Rail Corporation	IHRC		1980	1997	C&NC Railroad, CSX Transportation, Evansville Terminal Company, Fulton County Railroad, Hoosier Southern Railroad, Maumee and Western Railroad, Wabash Central Railroad	
Indiana and Illinois Railway		GTW	1900	1900	Grand Trunk Western Railway	
Indiana and Illinois Central Railway		B&O	1853	1875	Indianapolis, Decatur and Springfield Railway	
Indiana, Illinois and Iowa Railroad		NYC	1881	1906	Chicago, Indiana and Southern Railroad	
Indiana, Illinois and Iowa Railway		NYC	1893	1898	Indiana, Illinois and Iowa Railroad	
Indiana and Illinois Southern Railroad		IC	1886	1890	St. Louis, Indianapolis and Eastern Railroad	
Indiana Interstate Railway	IIRC		1978	1980	N/A	
Indiana and Lake Michigan Railway		NYC	1887	1898	St. Joseph, South Bend and Southern Railroad	
Indiana Midland Railway	IMID		1985	1987	Carthage, Knightstown and Shirley Railroad	
Indiana North and South Railroad		C&EI	1869	1879	Chicago and Block Coal Railroad	
Indiana Northern Railway		WAB	1891	1959	New Jersey, Indiana and Illinois Railroad	
Indiana and Ohio Railroad	INOH		1979	1997	Indiana and Ohio Railway	
Indiana Southern Railway		B&O, NKP	1866	1880	Fort Wayne, Cincinnati and Louisville Railroad, Ohio and Mississippi Railway	
Indiana and Southwestern Railway		NYC	1886	1887	Canada and St. Louis Railway	
Indiana and Western Railroad		IC	1899	1899	Illinois and Indiana Railroad	
Indiana Transportation Museum	ITMZ		1960	2023	Nickel Plate Express	
Indiana Stone Railroad		MON	1898	1916	Chicago, Indianapolis and Louisville Railway	
Indiana and Western Railway		NYC	1887	1887	Ohio, Indiana and Western Railway	
Indianapolis and Bellefontaine Railroad		NYC	1848	1855	Indianapolis, Pittsburgh and Cleveland Railroad	
Indianapolis, Bloomington and Western Railway		NYC	1869	1879	Indianapolis and Danville Railroad	
Indianapolis and Cincinnati Railroad		NYC	1853	1867	Indianapolis, Cincinnati and La Fayette Railway	
Indianapolis, Cincinnati and La Fayette Railroad		NYC	1873	1880	Cincinnati, Indianapolis, St. Louis and Chicago Railway	
Indianapolis, Cincinnati and La Fayette Railway		NYC	1867	1873	Indianapolis, Cincinnati and La Fayette Railroad	
Indianapolis, Crawfordsville and Danville Railroad		NYC	1868	1869	Indianapolis, Bloomington and Western Railway	
Indianapolis and Danville Railroad		NYC	1879	1879	Indiana, Bloomington and Western Railway	
Indianapolis, Decatur and Springfield Railway		B&O	1875	1887	Indianapolis and Wabash Railway	
Indianapolis, Decatur and Western Railway		B&O	1888	1894	Indiana, Decatur and Western Railway	
Indianapolis, Delphi and Chicago Railroad		MON	1872	1881	Chicago and Indianapolis Air Line Railway	
Indianapolis and Evansville Railroad		NYC	1880	1884	Evansville and Indianapolis Railroad	
Indianapolis and Louisville Railway		MON	1899	1916	Chicago, Indianapolis and Louisville Railway	
Indianapolis and Madison Railroad		PRR	1862	1866	Jeffersonville, Madison and Indianapolis Railroad	
Indianapolis and Ohio State Line Railway		NYC	1880	1881	Ohio, Indiana and Pacific Railway	
Indianapolis, Peru and Chicago Railway		NKP	1864	1887	Lake Erie and Western Railroad	
Indianapolis, Pittsburgh and Cleveland Railroad		NYC	1855	1864	Cleveland, Columbus, Cincinnati and Indianapolis Railway	
Indianapolis, Rochester and Chicago Railroad		NKP	1863	1867	Chicago, Cincinnati and Louisville Railroad	
Indianapolis and St. Louis Railroad		NYC	1867	1882	Indianapolis and St. Louis Railway	
Indianapolis and St. Louis Railway		NYC	1882	1889	Cleveland, Cincinnati, Chicago and St. Louis Railway	
Indianapolis and Sandusky Railroad		NKP	1877	1879	Lake Erie and Western Railway	
Indianapolis Southern Railroad		IC	1906	1911	Illinois Central Railroad	
Indianapolis Southern Railway		IC	1899	1906	Indianapolis Southern Railroad	
Indianapolis Union Railway	IU	NYC/ PRR	1853	1976	Consolidated Rail Corporation	
Indianapolis and Vincennes Railroad		PRR	1865	1905	Vandalia Railroad	
Indianapolis and Wabash Railway		B&O	1887	1888	Indianapolis, Decatur and Western Railway	
Jeffersonville Railroad		PRR	1849	1866	Jeffersonville, Madison and Indianapolis Railroad	
Jeffersonville, Madison and Indianapolis Railroad		PRR	1866	1890	Vandalia Railroad	
J.K. Line, Inc.	JKL		1990	2002	N/A	
Joliet and Northern Indiana Railroad		NYC	1854	1976	Consolidated Rail Corporation	
Junction Railroad		B&O	1848	1878	Cincinnati, Hamilton and Indianapolis Railroad	
Kentucky and Indiana Bridge Company		B&O/ MON/ SOU	1881	1900	Kentucky and Indiana Bridge and Railroad Company	
Kentucky and Indiana Bridge and Railroad Company		B&O/ MON/ SOU	1900	1910	Kentucky and Indiana Terminal Railroad	
Kentucky and Indiana Terminal Railroad	KIT	B&O/ MON/ SOU	1910	1981	Southern Railway	
Kingan Railroad			1873	1901	White River Railway	
Knightstown and Shelbyville Railroad			1846	1854	N/A	
Kokomo Belt Railroad		PRR	1888	1890	Chicago, St. Louis and Pittsburgh Railroad	
Kokomo and Marion Railroad		NKP	1875	1876	Frankfort, St. Louis and Toledo Railroad	
LaFayette, Bloomington and Muncie Railway		NKP	1879	1879	Lake Erie and Western Railway	
Lafayette and Indianapolis Railroad		NYC	1846	1867	Indianapolis, Cincinnati and La Fayette Railway	
La Fayette and Monon Railway		MON	1892	1897	Chicago, Indianapolis and Louisville Railway	
LaFayette, Muncie and Bloomington Railroad		NKP	1869	1879	Muncie and State Line Railroad	
La Fayette Union Railway		WAB	1890			
LaGrange, Toledo and Eastern Railway			1918	1920	N/A	
Lake Erie, Evansville and South Western Railway		SOU	1880	1880	Evansville Local Trade Railroad	
Lake Erie, Evansville and Southwestern Railway		SOU	1871	1877	Evansville Local Trade Railroad	
Lake Erie and Fort Wayne Railroad	LEFW		1904	1982	Norfolk and Western Railway	
Lake Erie and Louisville Railroad		PRR	1865	1890	Jeffersonville, Madison and Indianapolis Railroad	
Lake Erie and Louisville Railway			1871	1877	N/A	Sold at foreclosure; no property in Indiana
Lake Erie and Pacific Railroad		PRR	1860	1865	Lake Erie and Louisville Railroad	
Lake Erie, Wabash and St. Louis Railroad		WAB	1852	1856	Toledo, Wabash and Western Railroad	
Lake Erie and Western Railroad		NKP	1887	1923	New York, Chicago and St. Louis Railroad	
Lake Erie and Western Railway		NKP	1879	1886	Lake Erie and Western Railroad	
Lake Michigan and Ohio River Railway		C&EI	1885	1885	Chicago and Indiana Coal Railway	
Lake Shore and Michigan Southern Railway		NYC	1869	1914	New York Central Railroad	
Lawrenceburg and Upper Mississippi Railroad		NYC	1850	1853	Indianapolis and Cincinnati Railroad	
Lebanon and Western Railroad		IC	1887	1887	Rantoul Railroad	
Logansport, Camden and Frankfort Railroad		PRR	1869	1871	Logansport, Crawfordsville and South Western Railway	
Logansport, Crawfordsville and South Western Railway		PRR	1871	1879	Terre Haute and Logansport Railroad	
Logansport and Northern Indiana Railroad		PRR	1853	1863	Toledo, Logansport and Northern Indiana Railroad	
Logansport and Pacific Railroad		PRR	1853	1853	Logansport and Pacific Railway	
Logansport and Pacific Railway		PRR	1853	1854	Logansport, Peoria and Burlington Railway	
Logansport, Peoria and Burlington Railway		PRR	1854	1858	Toledo, Logansport and Burlington Railroad	
Logansport and Toledo Railway		PRR	1901	1905	Vandalia Railroad	
Louisville Bridge Company		PRR	1856	1918	Louisville Bridge and Railroad Company	
Louisville Bridge and Railroad Company		PRR	1918	1918	Louisville Bridge and Terminal Railway	
Louisville Bridge and Terminal Railway		PRR	1918	1954	Penndel Company	
Louisville, Evansville and St. Louis Railroad		SOU	1886	1889	Louisville, Evansville and St. Louis Consolidated Railroad	
Louisville, Evansville and St. Louis Railway		SOU	1882	1886	Louisville, Evansville and St. Louis Railroad	
Louisville, Evansville and St. Louis Consolidated Railroad		SOU	1889	1900	Southern Railway of Indiana	
Louisville and Jeffersonville Bridge Company		NYC	1887	1917	Louisville and Jeffersonville Bridge and Railroad Company	
Louisville and Jeffersonville Bridge and Railroad Company		NYC	1917	1968	N/A (owned by New York Central Railroad)	
Louisville and Nashville Railroad	L&N, LN	L&N	1880	1983	Seaboard System Railroad	
Louisville, New Albany and Chicago Railroad		MON	1859	1873	Louisville, New Albany and Chicago Railway	
Louisville, New Albany and Chicago Railway		MON	1873	1897	Chicago, Indianapolis and Louisville Railway	
Louisville, New Albany and Corydon Railroad			1887	2006	Lucas Oil Rail Line	
Louisville, New Albany and Corydon Railway			1881	1887	Louisville, New Albany and Corydon Railroad	
Louisville, New Albany and St. Louis Railway		SOU	1877	1882	Louisville, Evansville and St. Louis Railway	
Louisville, New Albany and St. Louis Air Line Railway		SOU	1870	1877	Louisville, New Albany and St. Louis Railway	
Madison Railway	MDRY		1977	1978	Madison Railroad	
Madison and Indianapolis Railroad		PRR	1836	1862	Indianapolis and Madison Railroad	
Madison, Indianapolis and Peru Railroad		NKP, PRR	1854	1854	Madison and Indianapolis Railroad, Peru and Indianapolis Railroad	
Marion and Logansport Railroad		PRR	1853	1854	Marion and Mississinewa Valley Railroad	
Marion and Mississinewa Valley Railroad		PRR	1852	1863	Union and Logansport Railroad	
Marion and Ottawa Railroad		NKP	1875	1876	Frankfort, St. Louis and Toledo Railroad	
Martinsville and Franklin Railroad		NYC	1846	1859	Franklin and Martinsville Railroad	
Michigan Air Line Railroad		NYC	1868	1916	Michigan Central Railroad	
Michigan Central Railroad	MC	NYC	1846	1976	Consolidated Rail Corporation	
Michigan City and Indianapolis Railroad		NKP	1870	1888	Lake Erie and Western Railroad	
Michigan Southern Railroad	MSO		1996	2001	Elkhart and Western Railroad, Kendallville Terminal Railway	
Michigan Southern and Northern Indiana Railroad		NYC	1855	1869	Lake Shore and Michigan Southern Railway	
Midland Railway		NYC/ PRR	1885	1891	Chicago and South Eastern Railway	
The Milwaukee Road, Inc.	MILW		1985	1986	Soo Line Railroad	
Mississippi and Atlantic Railway		IC	1875	1878	Havana, Rantoul and Eastern Railroad	
Monon Railroad	MON	MON	1956	1971	Louisville and Nashville Railroad	
Montpelier and Chicago Railroad		WAB	1890	1891	Wabash Railroad	
Muncie Belt Railway		NYC	1892	1938	Cleveland, Cincinnati, Chicago and St. Louis Railway	
Muncie and State Line Railroad		NKP	1879	1879	LaFayette, Bloomington and Muncie Railway	
Muncie and Western Railroad	MWR		1902	1995	N/A	
New Albany and Eastern Railway		B&O	1887	1888	Ohio and Mississippi Railway	
New Albany and St. Louis Air Line Railway		SOU	1869	1870	Louisville, New Albany and St. Louis Air Line Railway	
New Albany and Salem Railroad		MON	1847	1859	Louisville, New Albany and Chicago Railroad	
New Castle and Danville Railroad		NYC	1854	1869	Indianapolis, Crawfordsville and Danville Railroad	
New Castle and Muncie Railroad		NKP	1867	1868	Cincinnati, Connersville and Muncie Railroad	
New Castle and Richmond Railroad		PRR	1848	1853	Cincinnati, Logansport and Chicago Railway	
New Castle and Rushville Railroad		NKP	1879	1886	Fort Wayne, Cincinnati and Louisville Railroad	
New Jersey, Indiana and Illinois Railroad	NJII	WAB	1902	1983	Norfolk and Western Railway	
New York Central Railroad	NYC	NYC	1914	1968	Penn Central Transportation Company	
New York and Chicago Railway		NKP	1881	1881	New York, Chicago and St. Louis Railway	
New York, Chicago and St. Louis Railroad	NKP	NKP	1887	1964	Norfolk and Western Railway	
New York, Chicago and St. Louis Railway		NKP	1881	1887	Fort Wayne and Illinois Railroad	
New York, Fort Wayne and Chicago Railroad		NKP	1880	1881	New York, Chicago and St. Louis Railway	
Norfolk and Western Railway	N&W, NW		1964	1998	Norfolk Southern Railway	
North Western Grand Trunk Railway		GTW	1879	1880	Chicago and Grand Trunk Railway	
Northern Indiana Railroad		NYC	1837	1855	Michigan Southern and Northern Indiana Railroad	
Ohio Railway		NKP	1879	1880	New York, Fort Wayne and Chicago Railroad	
Ohio, Fort Wayne and Chicago Railroad		NKP	1880	1880	New York, Fort Wayne and Chicago Railroad	
Ohio and Indiana Railroad		PRR	1851	1856	Pittsburgh, Fort Wayne and Chicago Railroad	
Ohio, Indiana and Pacific Railway		NYC	1881	1881	Indiana, Bloomington and Western Railway	
Ohio, Indiana and Western Railway		NYC	1887	1890	Cleveland, Cincinnati, Chicago and St. Louis Railway, Peoria and Eastern Railway	
Ohio and Indianapolis Railroad		B&O	1853	1853	Junction Railroad	
Ohio and Indianapolis Railway		PRR	1832	1849	Jeffersonville Railroad	
Ohio and Mississippi Railroad		B&O	1848	1867	Ohio and Mississippi Railway	
Ohio and Mississippi Railway		B&O	1867	1893	Baltimore and Ohio Southwestern Railway	
Ohio Valley Railway		IC	1889	1897	Chicago, St. Louis and New Orleans Railroad	
Ohio Valley Railway and Terminal Company		IC	1888	1889	Ohio Valley Railway	
Orleans, Paoli and Jasper Railway		MON	1885	1887	Orleans, West Baden and French Lick Springs Railway	
Orleans, West Baden and French Lick Springs Railway		MON	1887	1897	Chicago, Indianapolis and Louisville Railway	
Pendleton and Indianapolis Railroad		NYC	1846	1848	Indianapolis and Bellefontaine Railroad	
Peninsular Railroad		GTW	1869	1870	Peninsular Railway	
Peninsular Railway		GTW	1870	1873	Chicago and Lake Huron Railroad	
Penn Central Transportation Company	PC		1968	1976	Consolidated Rail Corporation	
Penndel Company		PRR	1954	1976	Consolidated Rail Corporation	
Pennsylvania Company		PRR	1871	1918	Pennsylvania Railroad	
Pennsylvania Railroad	PRR	PRR	1918	1968	Penn Central Transportation Company	
Peoria, Decatur and Evansville Railway		IC	1880	1900	Illinois Central Railroad	
Peoria and Eastern Railway		NYC	1890	1976	Consolidated Rail Corporation	
Pere Marquette Railroad		PM	1899	1917	Pere Marquette Railway	
Pere Marquette Railroad of Indiana		PM	1903	1907	Pere Marquette Railroad	
Pere Marquette Railway	PM	PM	1917	1947	Chesapeake and Ohio Railway	
Peru and Detroit Railway		WAB	1889	1906	Wabash Railroad, Winona Interurban Railway	
Peru and Indianapolis Railroad		NKP	1846	1864	Indianapolis, Peru and Chicago Railway	
Philadelphia, Baltimore and Washington Railroad		PRR	1956	1976	Consolidated Rail Corporation	
Pigeon River Railroad	PGRV		1985			Still exists as a lessor of Indiana Northeastern Railroad
Pittsburgh, Cincinnati, Chicago and St. Louis Railroad		PRR	1917	1956	Philadelphia, Baltimore and Washington Railroad	
Pittsburgh, Cincinnati, Chicago and St. Louis Railway		PRR	1890	1917	Pittsburgh, Cincinnati, Chicago and St. Louis Railroad	
Pittsburgh, Fort Wayne and Chicago Railroad		PRR	1856	1861	Pittsburgh, Fort Wayne and Chicago Railway	
Pittsburgh, Fort Wayne and Chicago Railway		PRR	1862	1976	Consolidated Rail Corporation	
Plymouth, Kankakee and Pacific Railroad		NYC	1870	1881	Indiana, Illinois and Iowa Railroad	
Plymouth Short Line, Ltd.	PSLL		1985	1990	N/A	
Poseyville and Owensville Railroad	POR		1987	1996	Owensville Terminal Company	
Rantoul Railroad		IC	1887	1903	Illinois Central Railroad	
Richmond and Miami Railroad		PRR	1846	1854	Eaton and Hamilton Railroad	
Richmond and Miami Railway		PRR	1862	1890	Cincinnati and Richmond Railroad	
Rockport and Northern Central Railway		SOU	1869	1872	Cincinnati, Rockport and Southwestern Railway	
Rossville and Eastern Railroad		C&EI	1902	1903	Chicago and Eastern Illinois Railroad	
Rushville and Lawrenceburg Railroad		NYC	1848	1850	Lawrenceburg and Upper Mississippi Railroad	
Rushville and Shelbyville Railroad		PRR	1844	1859	Shelby and Rush Railroad	
St. Joseph, South Bend and Southern Railroad		NYC	1899	1943	New York Central Railroad	
St. Joseph Valley Railroad		NYC	1869	1870	Michigan Air Line Railroad	
St. Joseph Valley Railway			1905	1918	LaGrange, Toledo and Eastern Railway	
St. Joseph Valley Traction Company			1903	1918	N/A	
St. Louis, Alton and Terre Haute Railroad		NYC	1862	1890	Cairo, Vincennes and Chicago Railway	
St. Louis, Indianapolis and Eastern Railroad		IC	1889	1899	Indiana and Western Railroad	
St. Louis and South Eastern Railway		L&N	1872	1879	South East and St. Louis Railway	
St. Louis and Southeastern Railway		L&N	1871	1872	St. Louis and South Eastern Railway	
Seaboard System Railroad	SBD		1983	1986	CSX Transportation	
Shelby and Rush Railroad		PRR	1859	1882	Jeffersonville, Madison and Indianapolis Railroad	
South Chicago and Southern Railroad		PRR	1901	1954	Penndel Company	
South East and St. Louis Railway		L&N	1880	1936	Louisville and Nashville Railroad	
Southern Railway	SOU	SOU	1900	1990	Norfolk Southern Railway	
Southern Railway of Indiana		SOU	1900	1944	Southern Railway	
Southern Indiana Railway		MILW	1897	1910	Chicago, Terre Haute and Southeastern Railway	
State Line and Covington Railroad		C&EI	1877	1877	Chicago and Eastern Illinois Railroad	
State Line and Indiana City Railway		PRR	1887	1901	South Chicago and Southern Railroad	
Sturgis, Goshen and St. Louis Railway		NYC	1889	1915	New York Central Railroad	
Syracuse and Milford Railway			1907	1923	N/A	
Terre Haute and Alton Railroad		NYC	1851	1856	Terre Haute, Alton and St. Louis Railroad	
Terre Haute, Alton and St. Louis Railroad		NYC	1856	1862	St. Louis, Alton and Terre Haute Railroad	
Terre Haute, Brazil and Eastern Railroad	TBER		1987	1993	N/A	
Terre Haute and Indianapolis Railroad		PRR	1865	1905	Vandalia Railroad	
Terre Haute and Logansport Railroad		PRR	1879	1898	Terre Haute and Logansport Railway	
Terre Haute and Logansport Railway		PRR	1898	1905	Vandalia Railroad	
Terre Haute and Richmond Railroad		PRR	1847	1865	Terre Haute and Indianapolis Railroad	
Terre Haute and Southeastern Railroad		NYC	1878	1885	Evansville and Indianapolis Railroad	
Terre Haute, Worthington and Bloomfield Railway		NYC	1871	1879	Terre Haute and Southeastern Railroad	
Tiffin and Fort Wayne Railroad		NKP	1853	1859	American Central Railway	
Tippecanoe Railroad	TIPP		1980	1990	J.K. Line, Inc.	
Toledo, Cincinnati and St. Louis Railroad		NKP	1881	1884	Bluffton, Kokomo and Southwestern Railroad	
Toledo, Delphos and Burlington Railroad		NKP	1879	1882	Toledo, Cincinnati and St. Louis Railroad	
Toledo, Logansport and Burlington Railroad		PRR	1858	1862	Toledo, Logansport and Burlington Railway	
Toledo, Logansport and Burlington Railway		PRR	1862	1867	Columbus and Indiana Central Railway	
Toledo, Logansport and Northern Indiana Railroad		PRR	1863	1869	Detroit, Logansport and St. Louis Railroad	
Toledo, Peoria and Western Railroad	TPW		1976	1983	Atchison, Topeka and Santa Fe Railway	
Toledo, St. Louis and Kansas City Railroad		NKP	1886	1900	Toledo, St. Louis and Western Railroad	
Toledo, St. Louis and Western Railroad		NKP	1900	1923	New York, Chicago and St. Louis Railroad	
Toledo and Wabash Railway		WAB	1858	1865	Toledo, Wabash and Western Railway	
Toledo, Wabash and Western Railroad		WAB	1856	1858	Wabash and Western Railway	
Toledo, Wabash and Western Railway		WAB	1865	1876	Wabash Railway	
Twin Branch Railroad	TB		1925	1978	N/A	
Union and Logansport Railroad		PRR	1863	1867	Columbus and Indiana Central Railway	
Union Railroad, Transfer and Stock Yard Company		NYC/ PRR	1876	1881	Belt Railroad and Stock Yard Company	
Union Track Railway		NYC/ PRR	1850	1853	Indianapolis Union Railway	
Vandalia Railroad		PRR	1905	1917	Pittsburgh, Cincinnati, Chicago and St. Louis Railroad	
Vernon, Greensburg and Rushville Railroad		NYC	1879	1938	Cleveland, Cincinnati, Chicago and St. Louis Railway	
Vincennes and Cairo Railroad		NYC	1871	1872	Cairo and Vincennes Railroad	
Wabash Railroad	WAB	WAB	1942	1991	Norfolk and Western Railway	
Wabash Railroad		WAB	1899	1915	Wabash Railway	
Wabash Railroad		C&EI	1851	1853	Evansville and Crawfordsville Railroad	
Wabash Railway		WAB	1915	1942	Wabash Railroad	
Wabash Railway		WAB	1877	1879	Wabash, St. Louis and Pacific Railway	
Wabash Eastern Railway of Indiana		WAB	1889	1889	Wabash Railroad	
Wabash, St. Louis and Pacific Railway		WAB	1879	1886	Cairo, Vincennes and Chicago Railway, Wabash Eastern Railway of Indiana	
Wabash Western Railway		WAB	1887	1889	Wabash Railroad	
Wabash and Western Railway		WAB	1858	1858	Toledo and Wabash Railway	
Warsaw, Goshen and White Pigeon Railroad		NYC	1870	1871	Cincinnati, Wabash and Michigan Railway	
Western Division, Buffalo and Mississippi Railroad		NYC	1848	1855	Northern Indiana Railroad	
Western Indiana Railroad		C&EI	1872	1872	Chicago, Danville and Vincennes Railroad	
Western Indiana Railway		EJE		1897	Chicago Heights and Northern Railway	
White River Railway			1901			
White Water Railroad		NYC	1878	1890	Cleveland, Cincinnati, Chicago and St. Louis Railway	
White Water Valley Railroad		NYC	1865	1878	White Water Railroad	
Winona Railroad			1926	1952	N/A	Electric until 1938

=== Electric ===
Name	Mark	System (Note: This is one or more of the Class I railroads that the railroad became part of, if any.)	From	To	Successor	Notes
Beech Grove Traction Company						
Chicago and Indiana Air Line Railway			1901	1904	Chicago, Lake Shore and South Bend Railway	
Chicago, Lake Shore and South Bend Railway			1904	1925	Chicago South Shore and South Bend Railroad	
Chicago – New York Electric Air Line Railroad						Proposed but not built
Chicago South Shore and South Bend Railroad	CSS		1925			Continuing in operation as of 2018
Evansville Railway
Evansville Railways Company					Evansville and Ohio Valley Railway	
Evansville and Eastern Electric Railway			1904	1909	Evansville Railways Company	Operated electric passenger and steam freight trains
Evansville, Henderson and Owensboro Railway					Evansville Railways Company	
Evansville and Mount Vernon Electric Railway					Evansville Railways Company	
Evansville and Ohio Valley Railway			1918	1939		
Evansville and Southern Indiana Traction Company
Evansville Suburban and Newburgh Railway
Evansville Terminal Railway					Evansville Railways Company	
Garrett, Auburn and Northern Electric Railroad			1901			
Indiana Railroad			1930	1941		
Indianapolis and Cincinnati Traction Company			1905	1932		
Indianapolis and Eastern Railway				1907	Terre Haute, Indianapolis and Eastern Traction Company	
Indianapolis and Louisville Traction Company
Indianapolis and Martinsville Rapid Transit Company				1907	Terre Haute, Indianapolis and Eastern Traction Company	
Indianapolis and Northwestern Traction Company				1907	Terre Haute, Indianapolis and Eastern Traction Company	
Indianapolis and Western Railway				1907	Terre Haute, Indianapolis and Eastern Traction Company	
Indianapolis Coal Traction Company				1907	Terre Haute, Indianapolis and Eastern Traction Company	
Indianapolis, Crawfordsville and Danville Electric Railway				1912	Terre Haute, Indianapolis and Eastern Traction Company	
Interstate Public Service Company
Kokomo, Marion and Western Traction Company
Lebanon and Thorntown Traction Company
Louisville and Northern Railway and Lighting Company
Louisville and Southern Indiana Traction Company
Marion, Bluffton and Eastern Traction Company
Northern Indiana Railway
Ohio Electric Railway
Richmond Street and Interurban Railway				1907	Terre Haute, Indianapolis and Eastern Traction Company	
St. Joseph Valley Traction Company
Southern Indiana Railway
Terre Haute, Indianapolis and Eastern Traction Company			1907		Indiana Railroad	
Terre Haute Traction and Light Company				1907	Terre Haute, Indianapolis and Eastern Traction Company	
Winona Railroad
Winona Interurban Railway
Winona Service Company
Winona and Warsaw Railway
