= List of companies transferred to Conrail =

The Consolidated Rail Corporation (Conrail) was formed on April 1, 1976 not by a standard merger, but as a new government corporation that took over only designated lines and other rail-related assets from the existing bankrupt companies. Seven major companies were included:

- Penn Central Transportation Company (PC), successor to the New York Central Railroad (NYC), New York, New Haven and Hartford Railroad (NH), and Pennsylvania Railroad (PRR)
- Erie Lackawanna Railway (EL), successor to the Delaware, Lackawanna and Western Railroad (DL&W) and Erie Railroad (Erie)
- Ann Arbor Railroad (AA), controlled by Penn Central
- Central Railroad of New Jersey (CNJ)
- Lehigh and Hudson River Railway (L&HR)
- Lehigh Valley Railroad (LV), controlled by Penn Central
- Reading Company (RDG)

So were most railroads that had been leased or controlled by them, sometimes jointly.

Conrail maintained existing leases of the small Amsterdam, Chuctanunda and Northern Railroad (PC-NYC) and Central Railroad of Indianapolis (PC-NYC), as well as the Lehigh and Susquehanna Railroad (LV), owned by the non-railroad Lehigh Coal and Navigation Company. In addition, Conrail acquired long-term leases on several Canadian properties (all PC-NYC): the St. Lawrence and Adirondack Railway, the Canada Southern Railway, and its subsidiaries Detroit River Tunnel Company and Niagara River Bridge Company. All of these Canadian companies but the St. Lawrence and Adirondack were given up in 1985. None of the property of the New York and Harlem Railroad was transferred to Conrail, but a portion was operated under contract as a light-density line.

Name	Control	Notes
Allentown Terminal Railroad	CNJ	
Ann Arbor Railroad	AA	
Baltimore and Eastern Railroad	PC (PRR)	
Bay Shore Connecting Railroad	CNJ/LV	
Beech Creek Railroad	PC (NYC)	
Buffalo Creek Railroad	EL (Erie)/LV	Merged on December 31, 1983
Central Indiana Railway	PC (NYC/PRR)	
Central Railroad of New Jersey	CNJ	
Central Railroad of Pennsylvania	CNJ	No real property conveyed
Chicago, Kalamazoo and Saginaw Railway	PC (NYC)	
Chicago River and Indiana Railroad	PC (NYC)	
Cleveland and Pittsburgh Railroad	PC (PRR)	
Cleveland, Cincinnati, Chicago and St. Louis Railway	PC (NYC)	
Connecting Railway	PC (PRR)	
Dayton Union Railway	PC (NYC/PRR)	
Delaware Railroad	PC (PRR)	
Delaware and Bound Brook Railroad	RDG	
Detroit Manufacturers Railroad	PC (NYC)	
Dover and Rockaway Railroad	CNJ	
East Pennsylvania Railroad	RDG	
Erie and Kalamazoo Railroad	PC (NYC)	
Erie Lackawanna Railway	EL (Erie/DL&W)	
Erie and Pittsburgh Railroad	PC (PRR)	
Fort Wayne and Jackson Railroad	PC (NYC)	
Holyoke and Westfield Railroad	PC (NH)	
Hudson River Bridge Company at Albany	PC (NYC)	
Indianapolis Union Railway	PC (NYC/PRR)	
Ironton Railroad	LV/RDG	
Joliet and Northern Indiana Railroad	PC (NYC)	
Kalamazoo, Allegan and Grand Rapids Railroad	PC (NYC)	
Lackawanna and Wyoming Valley Railway	EL (DL&W)	
Lehigh and Hudson River Railway	L&HR	
Lehigh and New England Railway	CNJ	
Lehigh Valley Railroad	LV	
Little Miami Railroad	PC (PRR)	
Mahoning Coal Railroad	PC (NYC)	
Mahoning and Shenango Valley Company	PC (NYC)	
Michigan Central Railroad	PC (NYC)	
Monongahela Railway	MGA	Merged on May 1, 1993
Mount Hope Mineral Railroad	CNJ	
New York Connecting Railroad	PC (NH/PRR)	
New York and Long Branch Railroad	PC (PRR)/CNJ	
Niagara Junction Railway	EL (Erie)/LV/PC (NYC)	
North Brookfield Railroad	PC (NH)	
North Pennsylvania Railroad	RDG	
Northern Central Railway	PC (PRR)	
Norwich and Worcester Railroad	PC (NH)	
Penn Central Transportation Company	PC (NYC/PRR/NH)	
Penndel Company	PC (NYC/PRR)	Successor to a number of non-operating subsidiaries
Pennsylvania and Atlantic Railroad	PC (PRR)	
Pennsylvania–Reading Seashore Lines	PC (PRR)/RDG	
Pennsylvania Tunnel and Terminal Railroad	PC (PRR)	
Peoria and Eastern Railway	PC (NYC)	
Philadelphia, Baltimore and Washington Railroad	PC (PRR)	
Philadelphia, Germantown and Norristown Railroad	RDG	
Philadelphia and Trenton Railroad	PC (PRR)	
Pittsburgh, Fort Wayne and Chicago Railway	PC (PRR)	
Pittsburgh, Youngstown and Ashtabula Railway	PC (PRR)	
Plymouth Railroad	RDG	
Port Reading Railroad	RDG	
Raritan River Railroad	PC (PRR)/CNJ	Merged in April 1980
Reading Company	RDG	
Rochester and Genesee Valley Railroad	EL (Erie)	
Shamokin Valley and Pottsville Railroad	PC (PRR)	
South Manchester Railroad	PC (NH)	
Trenton–Princeton Traction Company	RDG	
Troy and Greenbush Railroad	PC (NYC)	
Union Depot Company (Columbus, Ohio)	PC (NYC/PRR)	
Union Railroad of Baltimore	PC (PRR)	
United New Jersey Railroad and Canal Company	PC (PRR)	
Waynesburg Southern Railroad	PC (PRR)	
Waynesburg and Washington Railroad	PC (PRR)	
West Jersey and Seashore Railroad	PC (PRR)/RDG	
Wharton and Northern Railroad	CNJ	
Wilmington and Northern Railroad	RDG	
American Contract Company	PC	No real property conveyed
Communipaw Central Land Company	CNJ	
Consolidated Real Estate Company	LV	
Despatch Shops, Inc.	PC	
Eastern Real Estate Company	RDG	
Erie Land and Improvement Company	EL (Erie)	
Erie Land and Improvement Company of Pennsylvania	EL (Erie)	
Hoboken Ferry Company	EL (DL&W)	
Hudson Realty Company	EL	
Lawroy Land Company	EL	
Manor Real Estate Company	PC	
New York Central Development Corporation	PC	
Penndiana Improvement Corporation	PC	
Providence Produce Warehouse Company	PC	
United Real Estate Company	LV	

A family tree, so to speak, of Conrail, CSX Transportation, and Norfolk Southern Railway. Only major railroads are shown. Links are clickable.
