= Indiana Railway =

Indiana Railway may refer to:

- The Indiana Railway Company (1880), predecessor of Grand Trunk Western Railroad
- The Indiana Railway Company (1886), predecessor of Chicago and Eastern Illinois Railroad
- Indiana Railway Company (1887), predecessor of Peoria and Eastern Railway
