= Michigan Southern Railroad =

Michigan Southern Railroad could refer to:

- The Southern Railroad (Michigan), built by the state of Michigan (1837–1846)
- The Michigan Southern Railroad (1846–1855), which bought the state line, and became part of the Lake Shore and Michigan Southern Railway
- The Michigan Southern Railroad (1989), a short line
