= Fulton County Railroad =

Short-line railway in Indiana, United States

Overview
- Headquarters: Rochester, Indiana
- Reporting mark: FC
- Locale: northern Indiana

Technical
- Track gauge: 4 ft 8 1/2 in (1,435 mm) standard gauge

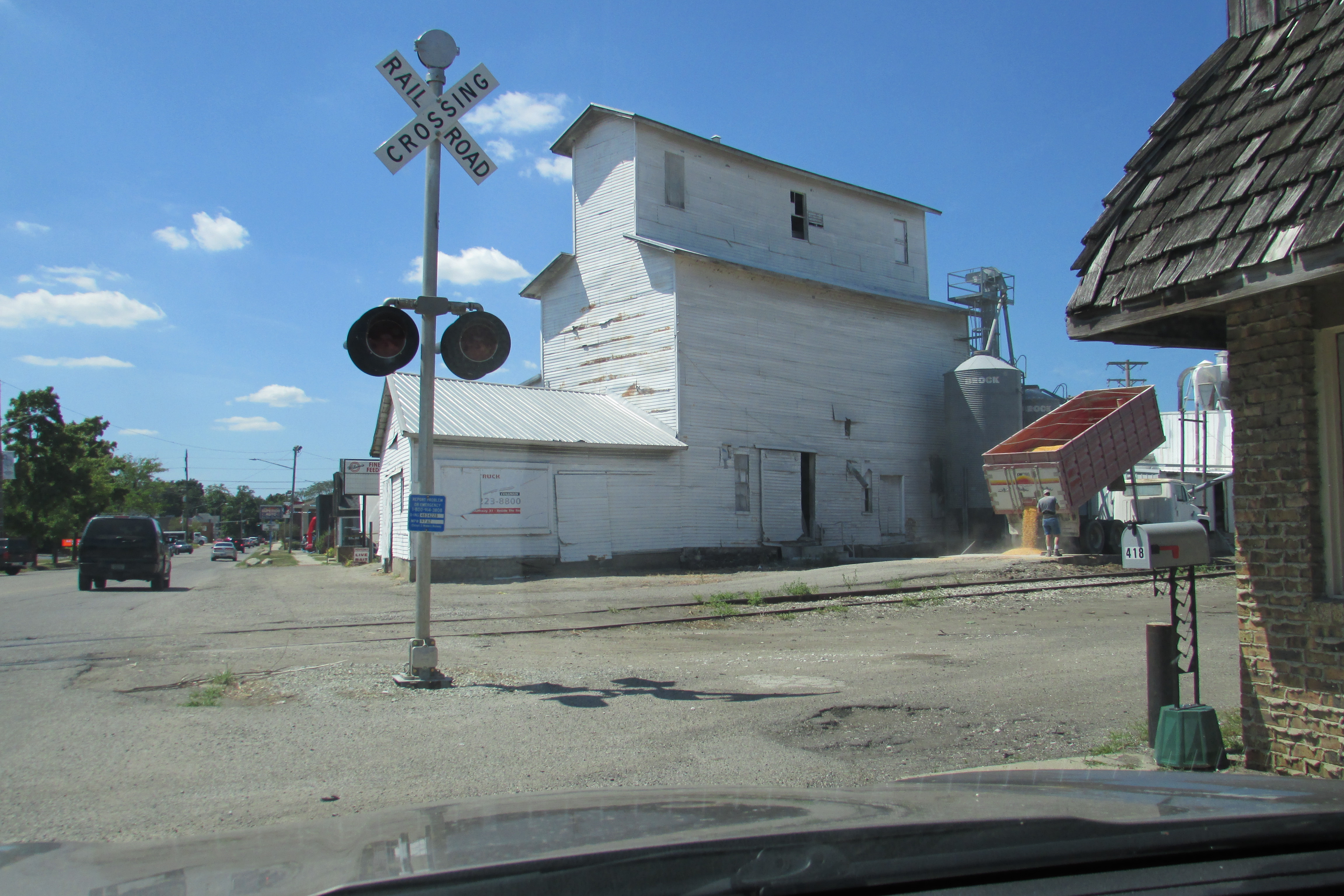
Sheppard, Denniston and Caffyn Elevator, south of the Fulton County Railroad (old Nickel Plate RR station location) in Rochester, Indiana.

The Fulton County Railroad (reporting mark FC) is a privately held short-line railroad that runs from Rochester to Argos, Indiana, where it connects with the Norfolk Southern Railway. It is a switching railroad that originally provided service to only one customer, Wilson Fertilizer and Grain in Rochester, and operates approximately 13 miles of track.

On February 24, 2011, freight on FC infrastructure was handled by Elkhart and Western Railroad through Trackage rights. In addition to the original customer, it also served a scrap yard and occasional other customers.

Starting in 2023 the new Rochester & Erie Railway (RERY) took over operations of the line from Rochester north to the NS interchange in Argos from the Elkhart & Western. The main customer of the RERY is the Rochester Iron and Metal scrapyard. The railroad is actively seeking new customers including for transloads and car storage. A June 2024 visit to the RERY showed the former Erie Railroad track remnant had been upgraded with new ties and a string of tank cars was being stored on it.

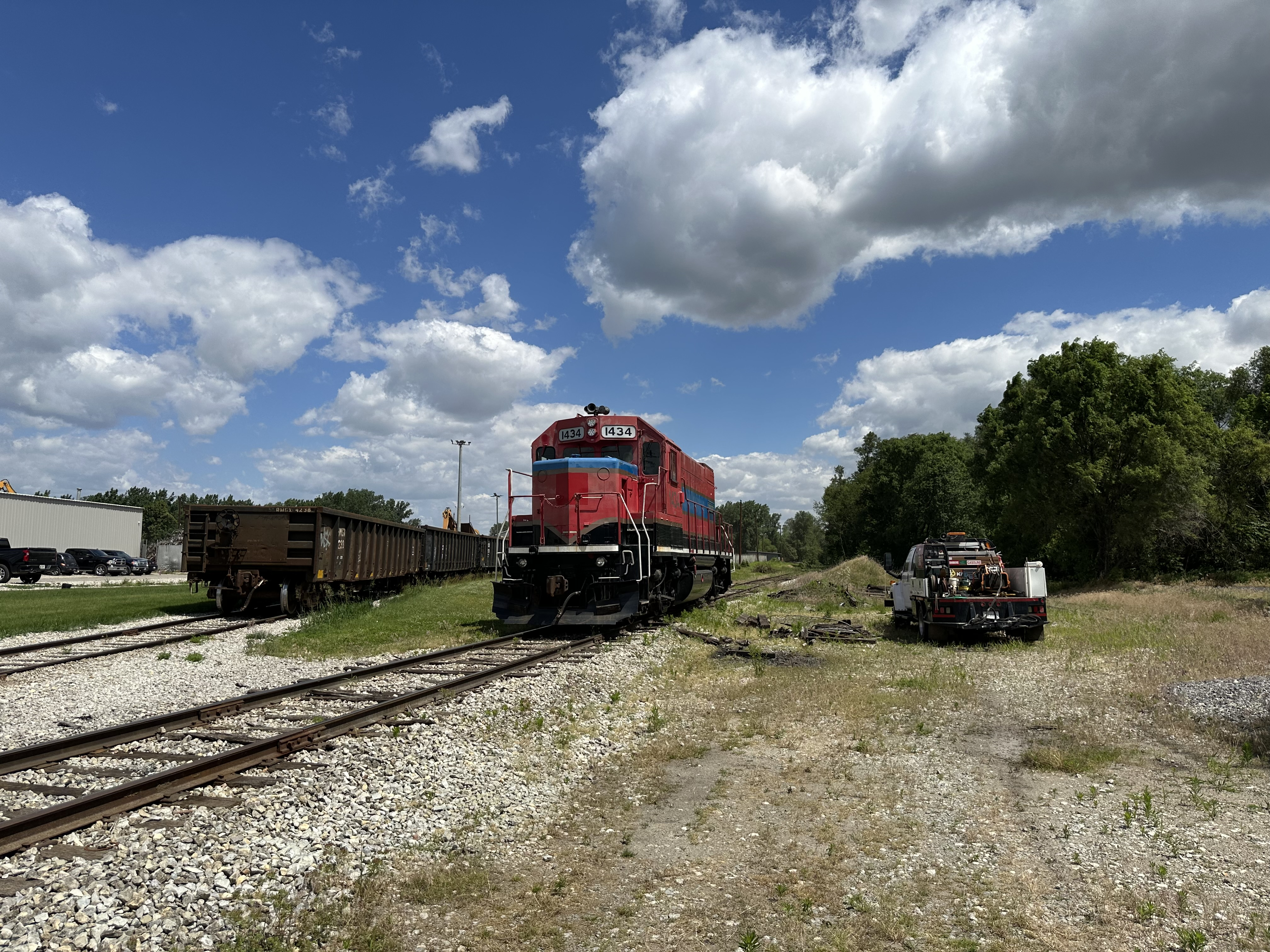
The Rochester and Erie Railway GP15 is parked outside the scrapyard on Lucas Street in Rochester, IN. June 7, 2024. Tom Burke Photo.
