= Evansville and Eastern Electric Railway =

Evansville & Eastern Electric Railway
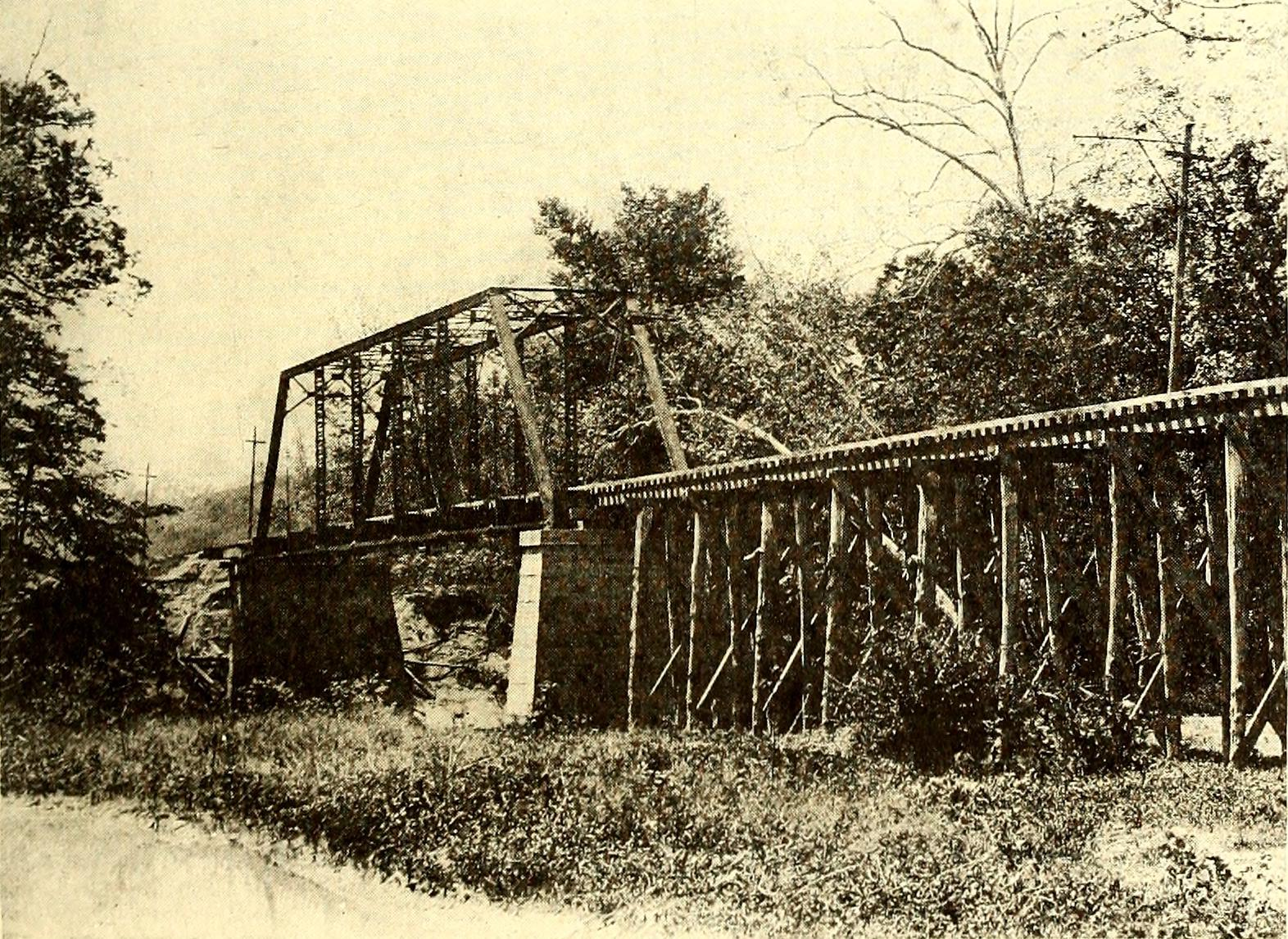
- One of two steel bridges

Overview
- Headquarters: Evansville, Indiana
- Locale: Indiana

Technical
- Track gauge: 1,435 mm (4 ft 8 1/2 in) standard gauge
- Length: 21 miles (34 km)

The Evansville & Eastern Electric Railway was put into operation on 10 June 1906 was one of the very few electric lines in the United States which did not parallel a steam railroad.

== Route ==
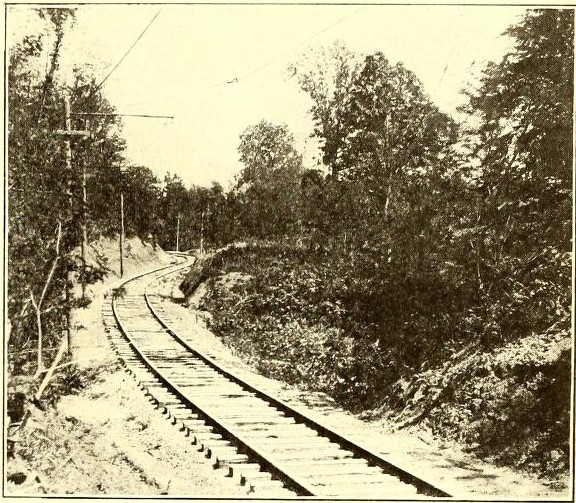
Picturesque spot on the Evansville and Eastern Electric Railway

The railroad extended a distance of 21 miles (34 km) from Newburgh, Indiana, which had a population of about 1500 people, to Rockport, having about 3500 inhabitants, with a 3 miles (4.8 km) spur north to Richland, Indiana. However, traffic arrangements had been made with the Evansville Suburban & Newburgh Railroad, whereby railcars were operated into Evansville over the tracks of the latter company.

The railroad passed through a rich farming country. Corn was raised on the river bottom farms on one side, while the land to the north was devoted to wheat raising. Wheat, which took one of the first prizes at the Chicago World's Fair, was cultivated on land near the line in Warrick County.

Previously, farmers of the region traversed have been compelled to haul their grain distances up to 10 miles (16 km) to Rockport, Boonville and Newburgh. Those near the river made shipments by way of unreliable river boats. Practically all these shipments from the territory 6 miles (9.7 km) from the line were subsequently carried over it. Before the railroad was completed the farmers made such insistent demands that arrangements were made to haul car-load lots of grain by means of the construction locomotive and about two hundred car loads were hauled.

The railroad was practically a farmers' line, and the greater portion of the receipts were derived from the farmers. There was, however, considerable through passenger traffic between Evansville and Rockport. The steam-railroad route between the two cities was 51 miles (82 km) long as against 31 miles (50 km) by the electric line. The time over the steam road was not to be considered, since very unreliable connections were made at Rockport Junction. During the first month's operation of the railroad an investigation showed that only five through steam-road tickets had been sold between Rockport and Evansville, and in three instances business along the line compelled the purchasers to take this route.

Owensboro, Kentucky, a city of about 15,000 people, located on the Ohio River, 8 miles (13 km) below Rockport, was also served by the line through boats which made connections with trains at Rockport. Other than the terminals the only towns on the main line were Yankeetown and Hatfield, with about 400 people each. Eureka, Indiana, with probably 600 people, lied about 1 mile (1.6 km) south of the line, and Richland, on the spur already referred to, had a population of about 800 inhabitants.

== Track and roadway ==
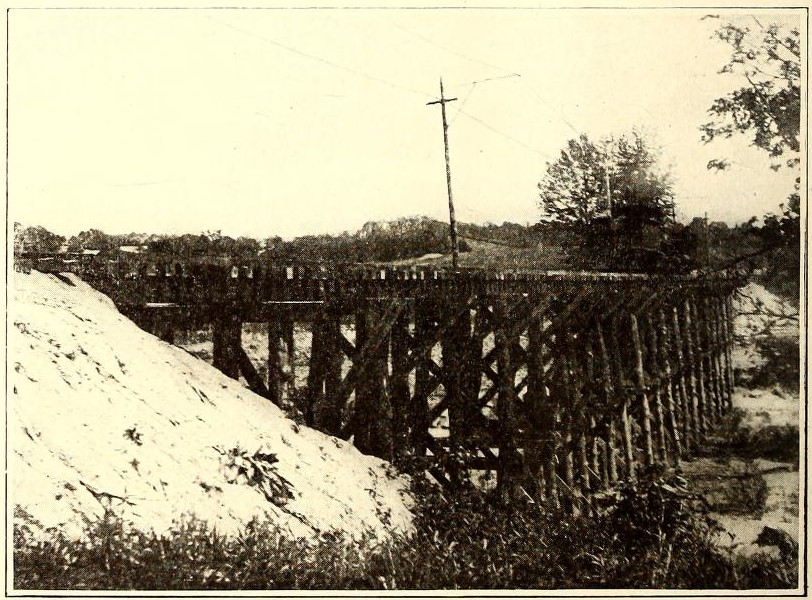
Trestle over a ravine near Yankeetown

All of the route, but particularly the western portion, was very picturesque. For about 2 miles (3.2 km) after leaving Newburgh the track was laid over bluffs on the bank of the Ohio River. The railroad then crossed behind the hills and passed over Cypress Creek on truss steel construction 115 feet (35 m) long. The only other steel structure on the line was that over Pigeon Creek, which was 130 feet (40 m) in length. Both rested on concrete abutments. Near Yankeetown the tracks were carried over a ravine on a wood trestle which was planned to be displaced later by a fill.

The heaviest grading was necessary near Yankeetown where some 22-ft. cuts were made. East of Yankeetown the country is comparatively level. All cuts were made 22 ft. wide at the bottom and fills are 14 ft. at the top.

The track is laid with 70-lb/yard (35 kg/m) rails on oak ties, obtained largely from the neighboring country. The entire railroad was bonded with brazed bonds, the work being done by the Electric Railway Improvement Company, of Cleveland, Ohio.

Sidings varied in length from 100 feet (30 m) to 300 feet (91 m) and were located at about 3-mile intervals. All passing sidings were double end; others are stub end. The sidings were placed more frequently than otherwise to provide for the simultaneous operation of freight trains and passenger cars.

Throughout its length the road was ballasted with gravel taken from the bed of the Ohio River, just above Newburgh. The gravel was dug up and loaded into barges by a dredge boat, and a tug towed the barges down the river to a coalmine incline, which extended over the tracks of the electric line. The coal-mine engines were used to pull small cars of gravel up the incline, and these cars were dumped, either directly into the ballast cars or into a hopper underneath the incline. The gravel was almost entirely free from sand and makes an excellent roadbed.

As the road was built partly for freight traffic, heavy grades were eliminated wherever possible. There was, however, one short grade of 2.4 per cent near Yankeetown.

== Overhead lines ==
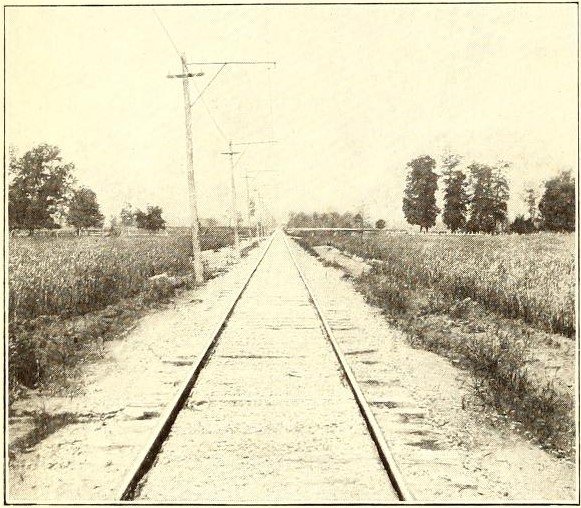
A long tangent on the Evansville and Eastern Railway

The trolley poles, which were of chestnut, 30 feet (9.1 m) and 35 feet (11 m) long, were spaced 100 feet (30 m) apart on tangents and as close as 75 feet (23 m) on curves. The poles were always placed on the outside of curves and are braced, either by deadmen, as shown in one of the accompanying illustrations, or by guy anchors. As no high-tension wires were carried on the poles, unnecessary height of poles was avoided by using a tubular steel bracket braced on the under side. A single trolley of No. 000 round wire was used. Telephone wires and feeders were carried on a cross-arm just below the bracket. Shaw nonarcing lightning arresters grounded to steel rods were placed three to the mile. All of the overhead material with the exception of the lightning arresters was furnished by the Ohio Brass Company.

== Power station and feeder system ==
The power station was located about midway of the length of the line, at Hartfield. It was a brick structure, divided into a boiler and engine room by a transverse wall. The boiler room contained two 300 hp B. & W. boilers served by one steel stack. In the engine room are installed two 375 kW units each, consisting of a Westinghouse compound non-condensing engine and a Westinghouse 600-volt generator. The switchboard was of Western Electric Company manufacture and consisted of two generator and two feeder panels. Water for the boilers was obtained from wells sunk near the power house, and coal was hauled in the company's cars from mines at Newburgh.

A 500,000 circ. mil feeder left the power house in each direction. The feeders continued at this size to points 5 miles (8.0 km) from the station where they are reduced in size to 350,000 circ. mil. These smaller feeders were carried to within 1 mile (1.6 km) of the ends of the line.

== Repair shops ==
A brick repair shop adjacent to the power house at Hatfield contained three storage tracks and space along one wall for the installation of requisite machinery.

== Rolling stock ==
The road was equipped with five passenger cars built by the American Car Company. The cars were 46 feet (14 m) long over all, 9 feet (2.7 m) wide and seated forty-eight people. The inside finish was dark oak. All were built with a small baggage compartment at one end and were intended for double-end operation. They were equipped with four Westinghouse 101-J motors of 50 hp each, and these were mounted on 21 E-1 Brill trucks. K-14 controllers were used. The cars were provided with Westinghouse Traction Brake Company straight air brakes, and Peter Smith hot-water heaters. They were painted a Big Four yellow, which color has been adopted by the company as a standard and is being used wherever possible.

Package freight was hauled in an express car of practically the same dimensions as the passenger cars. For handling heavy freight a steam locomotive and twelve standard steam-railroad freight cars were employed.

Passenger cars were operated between Evansville and Rockport on an hourly schedule. The run required 1 hour and 20 minutes and three cars were employed. The express car made two round trips per day.

At Rockport an agent was employed who gave all of his time to the company. In the other towns the agent was employed on a commission basis. Tickets were sold at approximately 2 cents per mile. An extra charge of 25 cents per piece was made for baggage.

The operating offices, which were now located in Evansville, were planned to be ultimately moved to Hatfield.

The road was constructed and partially financed by the Tennis Company, of Cincinnati, with C. H. Battin as engineer in charge.

The officers of the Evansville & Eastern Traction Company were initially:

- W. H. McCurdy, president
- W. L. Sonntag, vice-president
- M. S. Sonntag, secretary and treasurer
- C. H. Battin, general manager
- F. C. Storton, superintendent

The company and the Evansville & Mt. Vernon Electric Railway were held and operated by the Evansville Railways Company.

== Traffic ==
Including the two terminal towns the population along the line was not more than 400 per mile (640 per km), taken 2 1/2 miles (4 km) back on each side of the track. In the Northern portion of Indiana very few lines have been built through territories not showing a population of twice or three times as great. However, in estimating the possible earnings of the Evansville & Eastern Traction Company it must be remembered that the territory was entirely dependent on the line both for passenger and freight service, and that this exclusive territory extended back from the line in some places as great a distance as 6 miles (9.7 km). Moreover, it must be remembered that Evansville, though not on the line proper, must, under the initial operating conditions, be regarded as a terminal.

During the first few months operation the receipts have been such as to justify the belief that in electric railway construction there has been too great a tendency to parallel already existing steam lines, rather than to push out through thickly settled farming country, remote from steam roads.

By 1917, the Evansville and Eastern Electric had become part of the Evansville Railways Company. The operation of the railroad was discontinued in 1938.
