= Cincinnati, Indianapolis and Western Railroad =

Defunct American Class I railway

Cincinnati, Indianapolis & Western Railroad
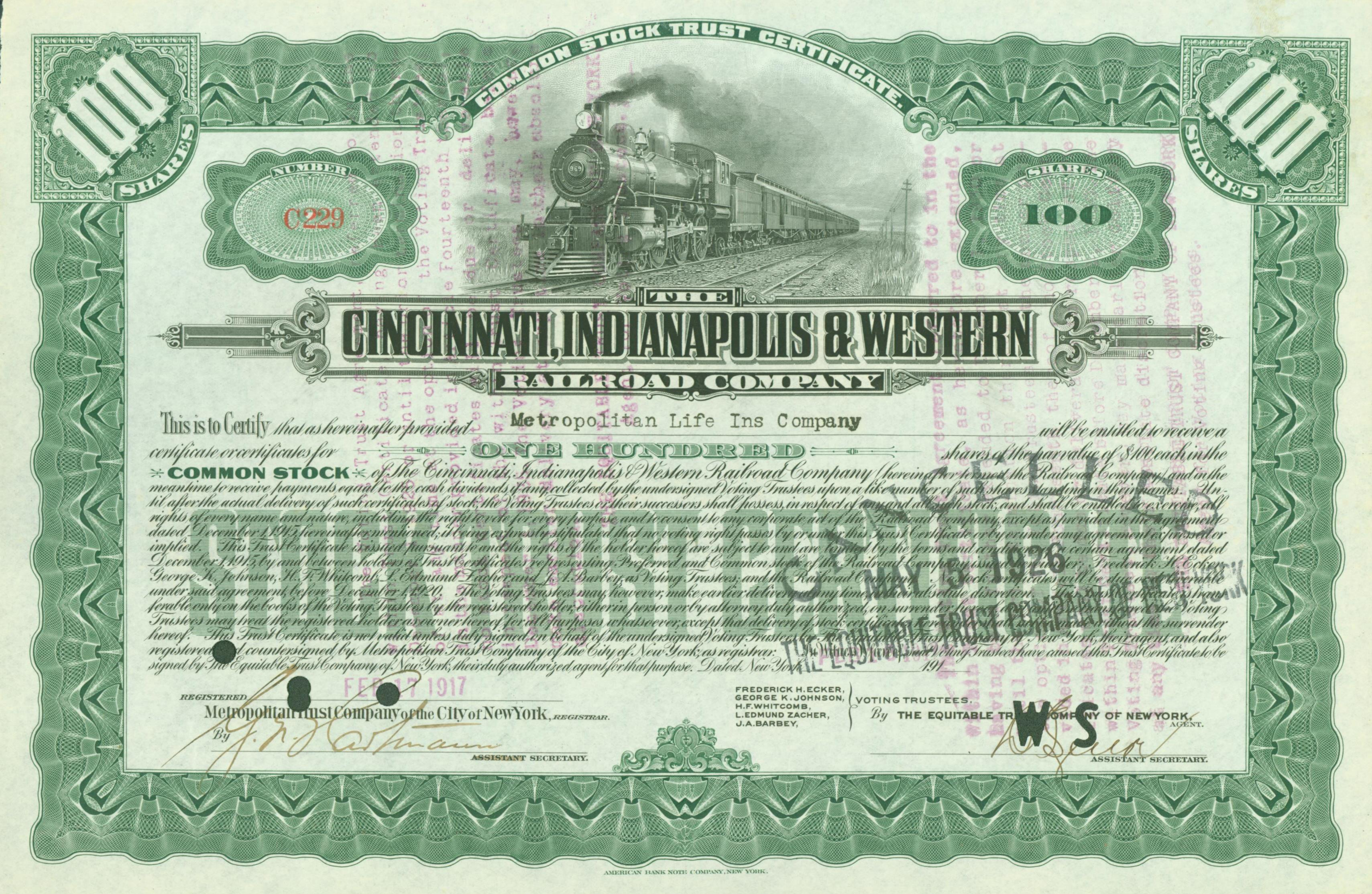
- Share of the Cincinnati, Indianapolis & Western Railroad Company, issued 17 February 1917

Overview
- Headquarters: Indianapolis, IN
- Reporting mark: CIWN
- Locale: Midwestern United States
- Dates of operation: 1915–1927
- Predecessor: Cincinnati, Indianapolis & Western Railway
- Successor: Baltimore and Ohio Railroad

Technical
- Track gauge: 4 ft 8 1/2 in (1,435 mm)
- Length: 347 miles (558 kilometres)

The Cincinnati, Indianapolis and Western Railroad (reporting mark CIWN) was established in 1915 as a reorganization of the Cincinnati, Indianapolis and Western Railway, which in turn had been created in 1902 as a merger of the Indiana, Decatur and Western Railway (ID&W) and the Cincinnati, Hamilton and Indianapolis Railroad (CH&I).

Predecessors of the ID&W include the Indianapolis, Decatur and Western Railway (1888–1894), the Indianapolis & Wabash Railway (1887–1888), the Indianapolis, Decatur and Springfield Railway (1875–1887), and the Indiana and Illinois Central Railway (1853–1875). Predecessors of the CH&I include the Junction Railroad (1848), the Cincinnati, Hamilton & Indianapolis, and the Cincinnati, Indianapolis & Western.

The CIWN's owned mainline was three segments connected and extended by trackage rights. The line was located in the states of Illinois, Indiana, and Ohio. The first segment extended from its trackage rights over the Chicago and Alton Railway in Springfield to Boody, Illinois. Trackage rights via the Wabash Railway connected Boody with Decatur, Illinois. The second segment ran from Decatur to Indianapolis, Indiana, where trackage rights over the Indianapolis Union Railway connected it with the third segment also located in Indianapolis. From there, the road extended to Hamilton, Ohio. Further trackage rights over the Toledo and Cincinnati Railroad extended the CIWN from Hamilton into Cincinnati, Ohio.

In 1925, the CIWN reported 376 million net ton-miles of revenue freight and 14 million passenger-miles; at the end of that year it operated 347 miles (558 km) of road and 460 miles (740 km) of track. In 1927, it was acquired by the Baltimore and Ohio Railroad.
