= Indianapolis and Bellefontaine Railroad =

Railway line in Indiana

Overview
- Headquarters: Indianapolis, Indiana, U.S.
- Locale: Indiana, United States
- Dates of operation: February 17, 1848–December 22, 1864
- Successor: Bellefontaine Railway; Cleveland, Columbus, Cincinnati and Indianapolis Railway

Technical
- Track gauge: 4 ft 8 1/2 in (1,435 mm) standard gauge
- Length: 83 miles (134 km)

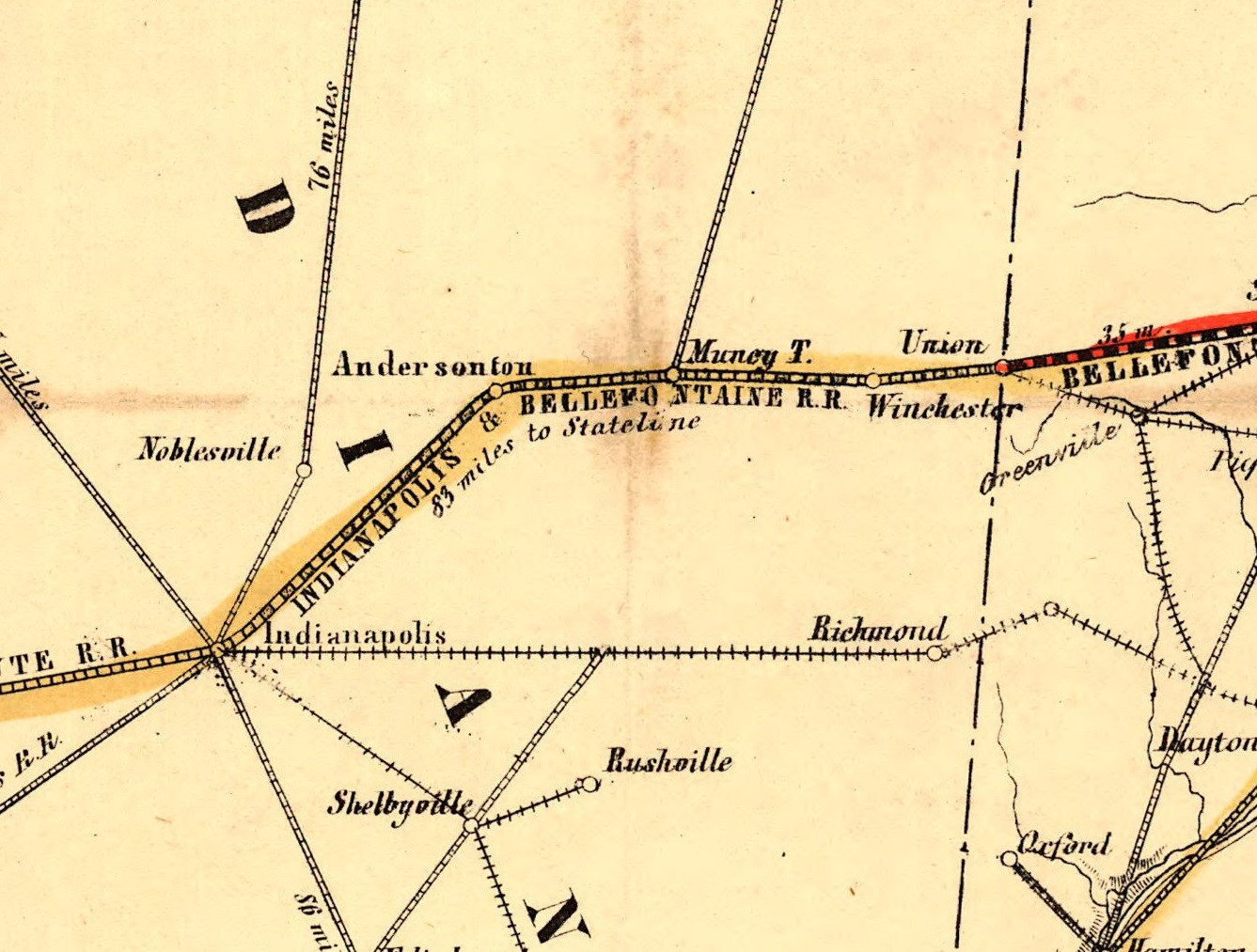
The Indianapolis & Bellefontaine as completed in 1852

The Indianapolis and Bellefontaine Railroad (I&B) was an American railroad founded in 1848. It changed its name to the Indianapolis, Pittsburgh and Cleveland Railroad (IP&C) in 1854. Its counterpart in Ohio was named the Bellefontaine and Indiana Railroad (B&I). The IP&C and the B&I merged to form the Bellefontaine Railway in September 1864. The Bellefontaine Railway subsequently merged with the Cleveland, Columbus, and Cincinnati Railroad to form the Cleveland, Columbus, Cincinnati and Indianapolis Railway in December 1864. It eventually become part of the New York Central Railroad.

== I&B history ==
The I&B was incorporated in the U.S. state of Indiana on February 17, 1848. Though the I&B originally used the 4-foot-10-inch (1.47 m) Ohio gauge, it was quickly converted to standard gauge (4 feet 8.5 inches (1.435 m)). Its counterpart, the B&I was chartered on February 25, 1848, in the U.S. state of Ohio. A construction firm owned by Amasa Stone, Frederick Harbach, and Stillman Witt contracted to build the Ohio line. Construction began in 1849 in Indiana, and the portion of the line from Indianapolis to the Indiana-Ohio border (the I&B) was largely complete by 1851. Construction from the border east to Cleveland (the B&I) began in 1852, and the line was complete in July 1853.

The Indianapolis & Bellefontaine changed its name to the Indianapolis, Pittsburgh and Cleveland Railroad on December 19, 1854. On March 14, 1856, the B&I entered into a joint operating agreement with the IP&C.

John Brough, a newspaper publisher and president of the Madison and Indianapolis Railroad, was elected the B&I's president in 1862. Stillman Witt, one of the directors of the B&I, urged Brough to run for governor of Ohio in 1864. Knowing that Brough could not afford the large reduction in pay, Witt agreed to become president of the B&I and forward his salary to Brough. Brough agreed, and Brough continued to receive the income from Witt until Brough's death on August 29, 1865.

On September 27, 1864, the B&I and the IP&C agreed to merge and form the Bellefontaine Railway. That agreement was filed with the Indiana Secretary of State on December 20 and with the Ohio Secretary of State on December 26.

On May 16, 1868, the Bellefontaine Railway was merged with the Cleveland, Columbus, and Cincinnati Railroad to form the Cleveland, Columbus, Cincinnati and Indianapolis Railway.

== Involvement in the Union Track Railway ==
On May 31, 1850, the I&B co-founded the Union Track Railway Company with the Madison and Indianapolis Railroad and the Terre Haute and Richmond Railroad.

The Union Track changed its name to the Indianapolis Union Railway (IUR) in 1853. The IUR opened the world's first union station in Indianapolis, Indiana, on September 20, 1853. The three parent companies formally entered into a controlling agreement for the IU on November 19, 1872. The company was incorporated on March 25, 1885.

== Route description ==
The I&B's main line runs from the IU tracks east of Union Station northeast to Lawrence, Pendleton, and Anderson, roughly running parallel to U.S. 36 until Anderson. Just west of Muncie, it turns to the east to pass through that city, then continues on through Winchester before reaching the Ohio state line at Union City, Indiana. From Anderson to the state line, runs roughly parallel with Indiana State Road 32. Continuing eastward from Union City, Ohio, it passes through Versailles and Sidney before reaching its other namesake, Bellefontaine. This Indianapolis-Bellefontaine main line, now owned and operated by CSX Transportation, remains an important rail corridor into the early 21st century.

== Bibliography ==
- Amato, Joseph Anthony (2013). Surfaces: A History. Berkeley, Calif.: University of California Press. ISBN 9780520272774.
- The Biographical Cyclopædia and Portrait Gallery With an Historical Sketch of the State of Ohio. Volume 1. Cincinnati: Western Biographical Publishing Company. 1883.
- Hover, John C. (1919). "The Story of Logan County". In Hover, John C Hover; Barnes, Joseph D.; Jones, Walter D.; Conover, Charlotte Reeve; Wright, Willard J.; Leiter, Clayton A.; Bradford, John Ewing; Culkins, W.C. (eds.). Memoirs of the Miami Valley. Volume 1. Chicago: Robert O. Law Co. "Bellefontaine and Indiana construction 1849."
- Hunter, Alan E.; Jarzen, Joseph M. (2011). Indiana's Historic National Road: The West Side, Indianapolis to Terre Haute. Charleston, S.C.: Arcadia Publishing. ISBN 9780738588629.
- Interstate Commerce Commission (1933). Interstate Commerce Commission Reports: Decisions of the Interstate Commerce Commission of the United States. Valuation reports, Volume 46 (Report). Washington, D.C.: U.S. Government Printing Office.
- Low, James W. (1862). Low's Railway Directory for 1862. New York: Wynkoop, Hallenbeck and Thomas, Printers. hdl:2027/nnc1.cu56626053.
- Moody's Investors Service (1931). Moody's Steam Railroads. New York: Moody's Investors Service.
- Ohio Commissioner of Railroads and Telegraphs (1868). Annual Report of the Commissioner of Railroads and Telegraphs of the State of Ohio, With Tabulations and Deductions From Reports of the Railroad Corporations of the State, for the Year Ending June 30, 1868. Columbus, Ohio: Columbus Printing Company, State Printers. hdl:2027/uc1.b2896930.
- Ohio Commissioner of Railroads and Telegraphs (1874). Seventh Annual Report of the Commissioner of Railroads and Telegraphs of Ohio for the Year Ending June 30, 1873. Columbus, Ohio: Nevins and Myers, State Printers.
- Ohio Commissioner of Railroads and Telegraphs (1901). The Thirty-Fourth Annual Report of the Commissioner of Railroads and Telegraphs, to the Governor of the State Ohio, for the Year 1901. Columbus, Ohio: F.J. Heer, State Printer.
- Orth, Samuel Peter (1910). A History of Cleveland, Ohio. Volume II: Biography. Chicago: S.J. Clarke Publishing Co.
