= Kendallville Terminal Railway =

Overview
- Headquarters: Peoria, Illinois
- Reporting mark: KTR
- Locale: Northern Indiana
- Dates of operation: 1996–Present
- Predecessor: Norfolk Southern Railway

Technical
- Track gauge: 4 ft 8 1/2 in (1,435 mm) standard gauge
- Length: 1.1 miles

Other
- Website: pioneerlines.com/the-kendallville-terminal-railway-company-ktr/

The Kendallville Terminal Railway (reporting marks KTR) is a Class III common carrier owned by Pioneer Railcorp, in Northern Indiana, United States. The line runs for 1.1 miles in Kendallville, Indiana and also connects with Norfolk Southern Railway in Kendallville. The main products shipped on the line include sugar and syrup.
