= Chicago and Atlantic Railway =

Railway in the United States (1871 - 1941)

Overview
- Headquarters: Rochester, IN
- Locale: Ohio, Indiana, Illinois
- Dates of operation: 1871–1941

Technical
- Track gauge: 4 ft 8 1/2 in (1,435 mm) standard gauge

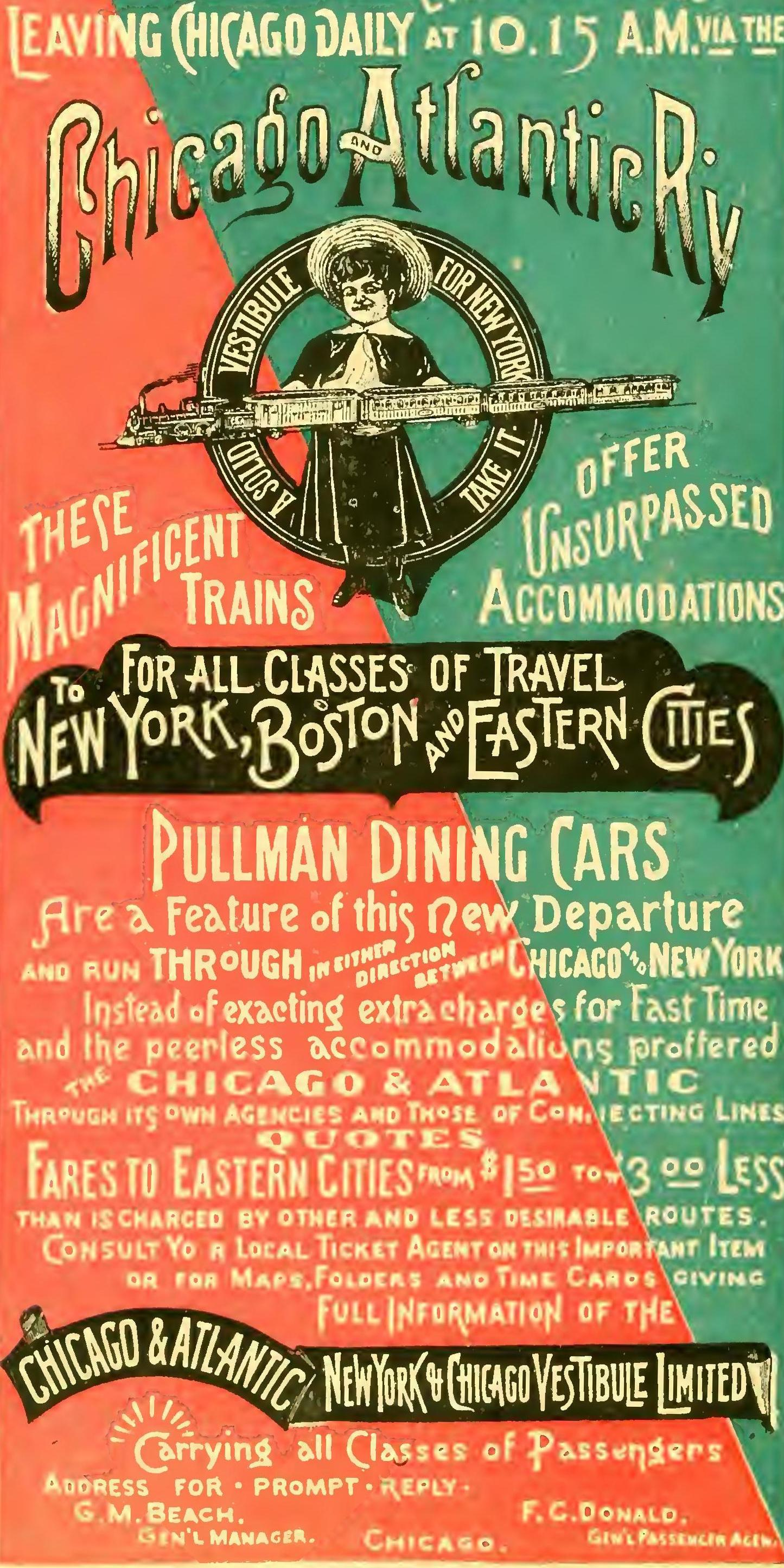
Chicago and Atlantic Railway 1889 ad featuring The New York and Chicago Vestibule Limited

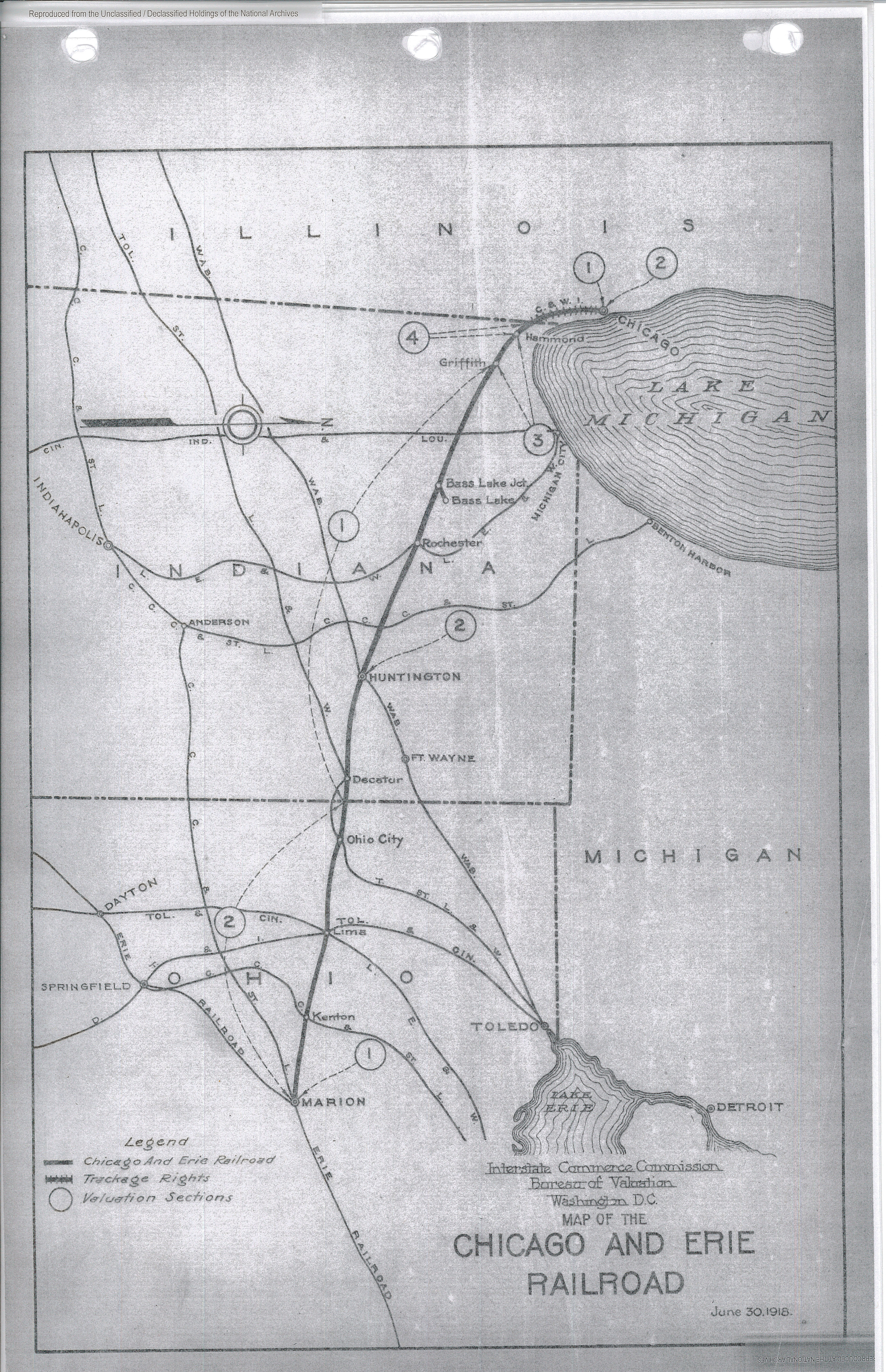
1910 map of the railroad

The Chicago and Atlantic Railway, later the Chicago and Erie Railroad, was a railway in the United States which existed from 1871 to 1941, and was an important connection between the Columbus, Ohio metropolitan area and Chicago, Illinois.

The railway was formed in 1871 as the Chicago, Continental and Baltimore Railway, and renamed to the Chicago and Atlantic Railway in 1873. The western terminus was in the Chicago suburb of Hammond, Indiana, while the eastern terminus was at Marion, Ohio. The road suffered financial difficulties (particularly after a collision in 1887 outside Kouts, Indiana, which killed 10 people), and went through several internal reorganizations and name changes. It went through bankruptcy in 1890, and emerged as the Chicago and Erie Railroad with John G. McCullough as its president.

In 1895, the road was purchased by the Erie Railroad, but retained its name and identity until it was consolidated in 1941.
