= C&NC Railroad =

Short-line railroad in Indiana, United States

Overview
- Headquarters: Corydon, Indiana
- Reporting mark: CNUR
- Locale: eastern Indiana
- Dates of operation: 1997–2021

Technical
- Track gauge: 4 ft 8 1/2 in (1,435 mm) standard gauge

The C&NC Railroad, also known as the Connersville and New Castle Railroad (reporting mark CNUR), was a Class III short-line railroad owned by RMW Ventures, LLC and connected the towns of Beesons and New Castle in eastern Indiana. Beginning from an interchange with the Big 4 Terminal Railroad line in Beesons, it ran north through Fayette County, then through the Wayne County communities of Milton and Cambridge City, then northwest into Henry County through New Lisbon to New Castle, where it joined a Norfolk Southern line. The total length of the line was 27.62 miles (44.45 km).

The C&NC began operations December 22, 1997, with four employees.

By summer of 2021, the C&NC filed with the Surface Transportation Board (STB) to discontinue operations, with service on the line reverting to Norfolk Southern (NS). On August 20, 2021, the STB approved the railroad's petition to waive advance notice requirements to its customers, and NS was set to assume operations on September 20.
