= Indiana, Bloomington and Western Railway =

Map

The Indiana, Bloomington and Western Railway was a railroad that once operated in Illinois, Indiana, and Ohio.

Its immediate predecessor, the Indianapolis, Bloomington and Western Railway, was formed on July 20, 1869, from the merger of the Indianapolis, Crawfordsville and Danville Railroad with the Danville, Urbana, Bloomington and Pekin Railroad. Both of these predecessor companies had been chartered in 1866, but construction of the railroads had not yet been completed at the time of the merger. After this combination, the railroad was completed and opened in July, 1869, connecting Pekin, Illinois, with Indianapolis, Indiana.

In 1879, there was a foreclosure and reorganization of the company, after which it was known as the Indiana, Bloomington and Western Railway. In 1881, it merged with the Ohio, Indiana and Pacific Railway (OI&P), which operated on partially completed tracks between Springfield, Ohio, and Indianapolis. The resulting company retained the Indiana, Bloomington and Western name. The OI&P rail line from Indianapolis east to Springfield (Ohio) was completed by the IB&W and opened in 1883.

The financial difficulties of the company continued, however, and in 1887 there was another foreclosure and sale of the company's assets. This resulted in a reorganization, after which the company was known as the Ohio, Indiana and Western Railway. At least one locomotive was lettered for the OI&W, No.4, whose Builder's Plate reads “Built at IB&W Shops,” although the locomotive has also been identified as an 8-Wheel American 4-4-0 1886 product of the Rhode Island Locomotive Works. The reorganization was unsuccessful, however, and another foreclosure ensued in 1889. After that reorganization, the line from Indianapolis westward was sold to the Peoria and Eastern Railway, while the newer track east of Indianapolis was purchased by the Cleveland, Cincinnati, Chicago and St. Louis Railway (Big Four).
