= Evansville and Ohio Valley Railway =

Evansville and Ohio Valley Railway was a transit operator in Indiana and Kentucky. The company operated local services in Evansville as well as longer-distance routes to outlying towns; it additionally operated the local transit system of Owensboro, Kentucky. The company originally consolidated the existing interurbans and streetcars in the area, but would transition to buses by 1939.

== History ==
The company formed in 1918 as a consolidation of traction companies centered on Evansville. It took over railway operations the following year. Lines extended to Grandview, Mount Vernon, and Henderson, Kentucky. The company also owned and operated the Evansville, Henderson and Owensboro Railway, organized October 1911, which ran between Owensboro and Henderson utilizing a river crossing via steel ferry. The Owensboro, Kentucky streetcar system was also owned by the Evansville and Ohio Valley Railway Company.

Claims paid out from a fatal wreck in 1927 forced the company into bankruptcy. Streetcars in Owensboro ceased on April 14, 1934. The Rockport Line was abandoned on October 17, 1938. Evansville's streetcars stopped running on February 1, 1939, with service replaced with buses. That June, the company was sold to the newly organized Evansville and Ohio Valley Railway Company, Incorporated.

The system was purchased by Will Coach Line in 1968, but both companies would cease operations in 1970 after declaring bankruptcy. The operating franchises were sold to the city, resulting in municipal operation of transit in the Evansville area.

== See also ==
- Southern Indiana Gas and Electric Company
- Evansville and Eastern Electric Railway
