= Terre Haute, Brazil and Eastern Railroad =

The Terre Haute, Brazil and Eastern Railroad was a short-line railroad that was incorporated May 1, 1987 and began operations on October 15, 1987. The TBER operated over 30 miles of the Pennsylvania Railroad's St. Louis-Indianapolis-Pittsburgh Line, which had been abandoned by Conrail in 1984 in favor of the former New York Central-Big Four St. Louis Line subdivision. The line extended from Terre Haute to Limedale and included a seven-mile branch line to the Amax Coal Company's Chinook Mine south of Brazil.

The TBER interchanged with the Soo Line Railroad's Latta Subdivision, Conrail's St. Louis Line and CSX's CE&D Subdivision in Terre Haute. Traffic was an even mix of lumber, fertilizer, and plastic pellets inbound and grain, cement, and plastic pipe outbound. A tourist excursion called the Beaver Hawk Express was operated under contract between Brazil, Indiana and Limedale. Coal traffic was also anticipated but failed to materialize, as a result the line entered bankruptcy. The TBER ceased operation on December 31, 1993, and the line was dismantled.

== Motive Power ==
The TBER operated three locomotives.

1. 100 an ex-Missouri Pacific EMD SW1200
2. 101 an ex-Chicago Rock Island & Pacific EMD SW8
3. 6999 an ex-Pennsylvania, Penn Central, Conrail EMD SD7 was owned by the proprietors of the Beaver Hawk Express and never saw service on the TBER.
