= Elkhart and Western Railroad (2001) =

Short-line railroad in Indiana, United States

Elkhart & Western Railroad Co.
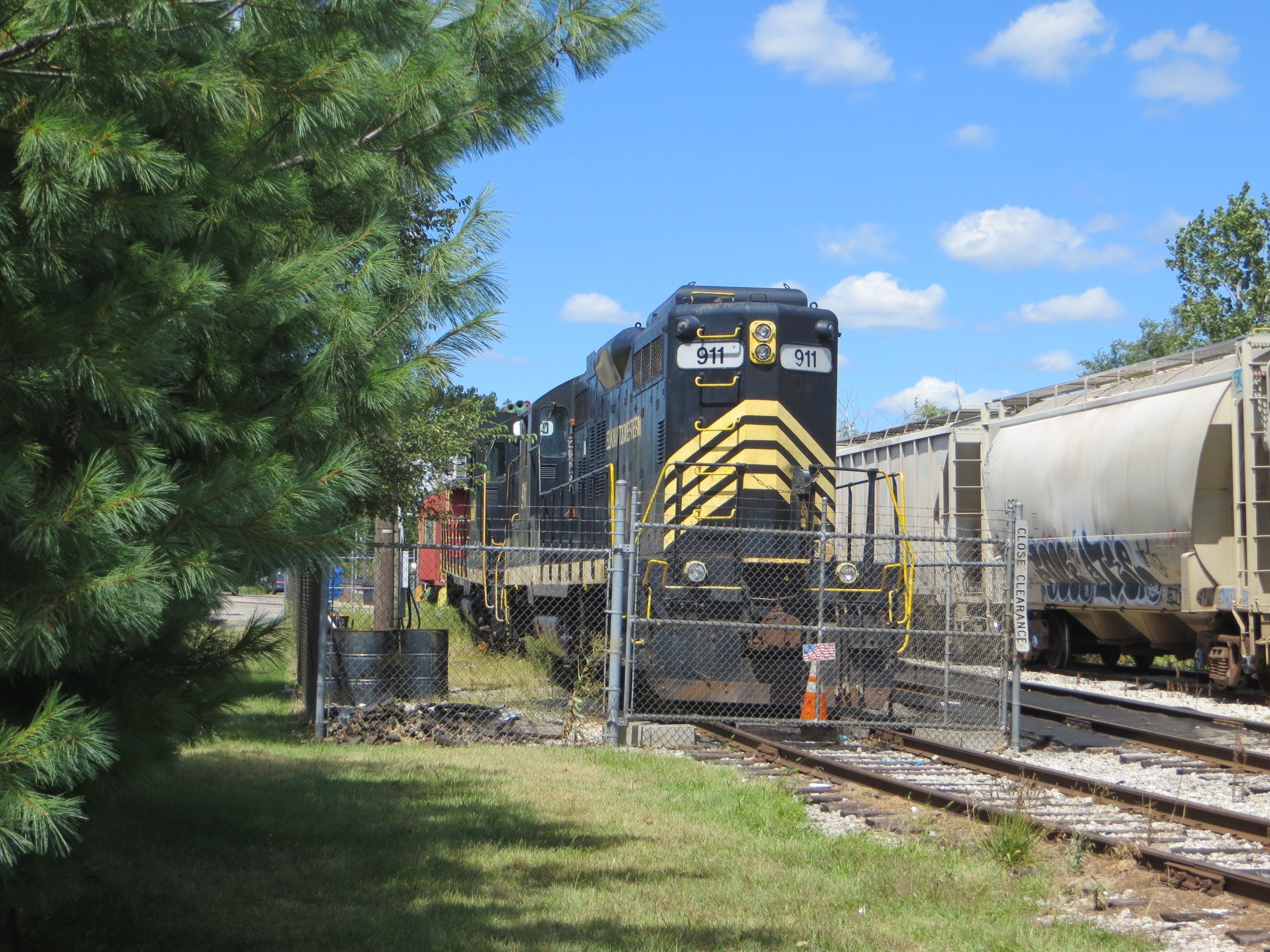
- EWR's GP9 #911 in Elkhart on 2015-08-24

Overview
- Parent company: Pioneer Lines
- Headquarters: Elkhart, Indiana
- Reporting mark: EWR
- Dates of operation: 2001–present
- Predecessors: Argos Branch: Nickel Plate Railroad; Elkhart Branch: Michigan Southern Railroad; Monon Branch: Monon Railroad

Technical
- Track gauge: 4 ft 8 1/2 in (1,435 mm) standard gauge
- Track length: 47 mi (76 km)

Other
- Website: pioneerlines.com/elkhart-and-western-railway-ewr/

The Elkhart & Western Railroad Co. (reporting mark EWR), was a wholly owned subsidiary of Pioneer Railcorp (reporting mark PREX), is a Class III short-line railroad operating three unconnected lines in northern Indiana, United States. In 2022 Patriot Rail acquired Pioneer and the EWR.

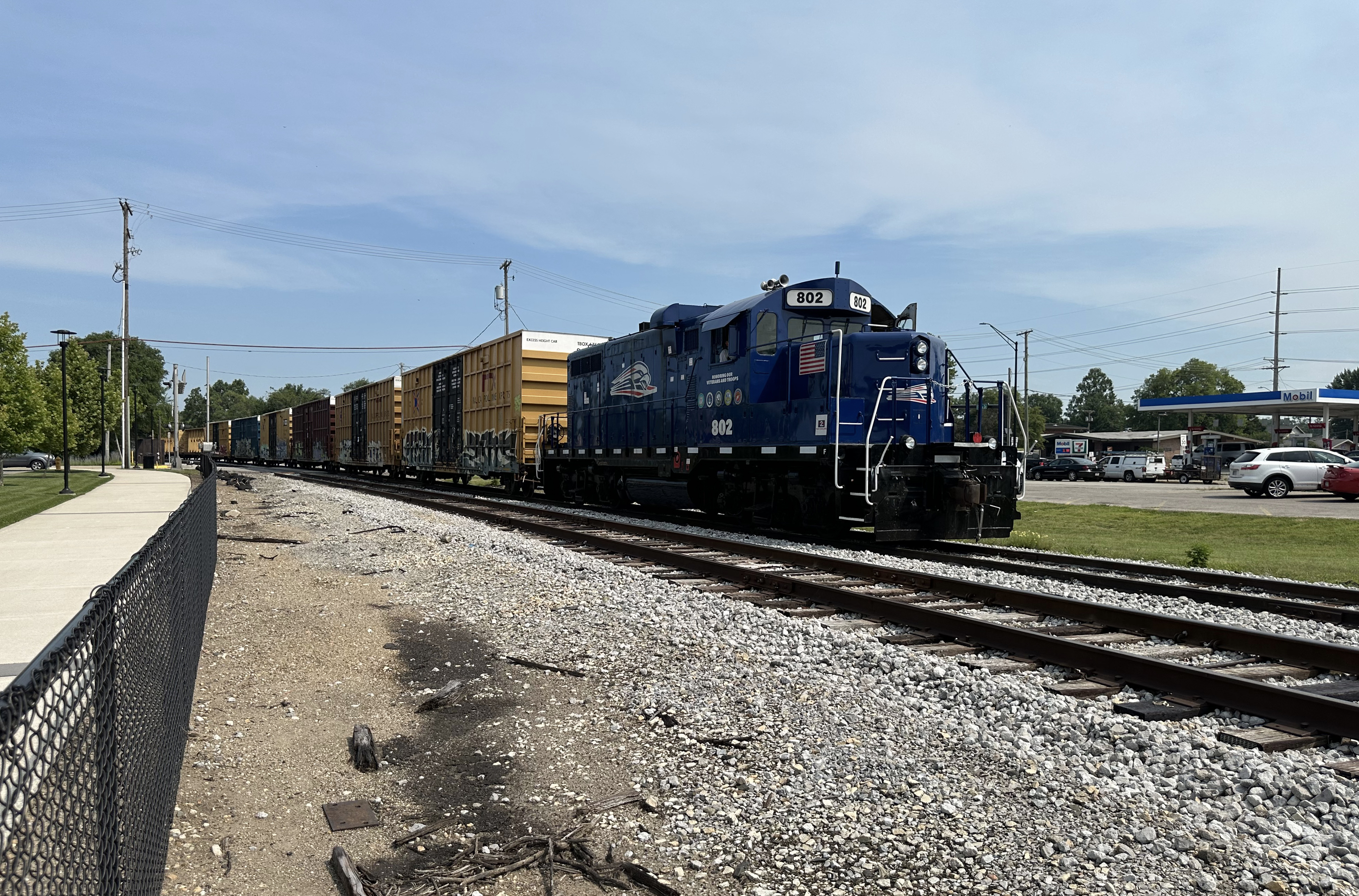
An Elkhart & Western train is arriving at its yard after working industries on the west end earlier in the morning. July 14, 2026.

The first, the Elkhart Branch, is in and around the city of Elkhart in Elkhart County, the second, the Argos Branch, radiates from Plymouth, in Marshall County, and the third, the Monon Branch, operating from Monon to Monticello, in White County.

Pioneer Railcorp created the Elkhart & Western Railroad, on May 1, 2001, from a 10-mile (16 km) stretch of the Michigan Southern Railroad. The Elkhart Branch begins at its junction with the Norfolk Southern Railway near the center of Elkhart, then crosses the St. Joseph River, which it follows westward, and finally ends on the northeast side of Mishawaka, in neighboring St. Joseph County.

Freight hauled on the EWR Elkhart Line consists mainly of plastic flakes, lumber, paper and cement. Freight hauled on the EWR Argos Line consists of mainly scrap iron, paper, plastic pellets, and lime, with the addition of storage car holding.

In January 2018, CSX sold 9.58 mi (15.42 km) of track running from Monon to Monticello, to ETW. Operations began in August, serving the only customer on the line, Monticello Farm Service, Inc.

On September 14, 2022, Patriot Rail Company, LLC, completed its purchase of Pioneer Lines parent company BRX Transportation Holdings. The purchase included the Elkhart & Western Railroad.

In 2023 new shortline Rochester & Erie Railway took over operations from EWR of the line owned by Fulton County from Argos south into Rochester. EWR continues to operate the northern end of this line from Argos to Walkerton.

A proposal to create a new connection between the Elkhart & Western's Elkhart-based operation and Canadian National on the west end in Mishawaka was defeated in June 2026 due to community pressure.

== Power ==
The EWR received its two locomotives from Pioneer Railcorp, and although the units no longer have the Pioneer reporting marks, the units are still owned by EWR's parent.

Number	Model	Acquired	Branch	Notes
911	EMD GP9	2001	Elkhart	Built as Milwaukee Road (MILW) GP9 315; sold to Minnesota Valley Authority (MNVA) 315; became PREX 911. Rail-fans have labeled this unit as EWR GP9R 911 which is neither its correct reporting mark nor unit classification.
912	EMD GP9	2001	Elkhart	-
1608	GP16	2021 1600 to be scrapped 2022	Argos	-
1606	GP16	2019	Argos	-
1601	GP16	2019	Monon	Previously served on the ND&W. Swapped with 3001 late 2019.
