= Indianapolis Union Railway =

Terminal railroad serving Indiana, US

Overview
- Headquarters: Indianapolis, Indiana
- Reporting mark: IU
- Locale: Indiana
- Dates of operation: 1850–

Technical
- Track gauge: 4 ft 8 1/2 in (1,435 mm) standard gauge

The Indianapolis Union Railway Company (reporting mark IU), is a terminal railroad operating in Indianapolis, Indiana. It was organized on May 31, 1850, as the Union Track Railway Company by the presidents of the Madison and Indianapolis Railroad (M&I), the Terre Haute and Richmond Railroad (TH&R), and the Indianapolis and Bellefontaine Railroad (I&B) for the purposes of establishing and operating joint terminal facilities in Indiana's capital city. The name of the company was changed to its present one on August 12, 1853. The next month, on September 20, Indianapolis Union Station opened its doors, becoming the first union railroad station in the world. Since 1999, the company has been owned and operated by CSX.

== History ==
=== 1850 to 1900 ===
The Union Track Railway Company was organized on May 31, 1850. Later that year, 1.60 miles (2.57 km) of main line track were turned over to the company; 0.64 miles (1.03 km) from the Peru and Indianapolis Railroad (P&I) and 0.96 miles (1.54 km) that had been jointly constructed by the three founding lines (the M&I, the TH&R, and the I&B). On November 25, 1852, the company's directors adopted a resolution by which other railroads might be admitted into the group. The Indiana Central Railway (IndC) and the Lawrenceburg and Upper Mississippi Railroad (L&UM) were so included shortly thereafter.

On August 12, 1853, the company renamed itself the Indianapolis Union Railway Company. On September 20, 1883, a new joint ownership, lease, and operations agreement was reached and entered into by the participating railroads. This date also marked the 30th anniversary of the opening of Indianapolis' original Union Station.

On March 14, 1884, the property of Union Station and 1.11 miles (1.79 km) of main line track were conveyed to the Indianapolis Union Railway by deed. This included 0.87 miles (1.40 km) that had been jointly constructed by the three founding lines, and an additional 0.24 miles (0.39 km) from the P&I. That same day, all properties that had been used but not deeded under a November 19, 1872 agreement were ceded by joint deed to the IU by the following companies: the Jeffersonville, Madison and Indianapolis Railroad (successor to the M&I), the Terre Haute and Indianapolis Rail Road (successor to the TH&R), the Chicago and St. Louis Railway (C&StL), and the Cincinnati, Indianapolis, St. Louis and Chicago Railway (CIStL&C).

On March 2, 1885, the Indiana General Assembly passed legislation allowing for the incorporation of union railroad companies. The Indianapolis Union Railway was incorporated under that act a few days later, on March 25.

By late 1886, the IU had outgrown its facilities. In November of that year, work began on additional facilities that would be completed by 1888. These included a rearranged and enlarged track system, renewed and additional retaining walls, new bridges, a new head house, office building and train shed, and a below-grade crossing for street railway and pedestrian use at Illinois Street. The head house of Indianapolis Union Station which resulted form this project still stands today.

=== 1900 to 1950 ===
From July 1, 1915, through the end of 1922, another large construction project was undertaken to elevate the tracks over 18 feet (5.5 m) via earthen embankments, retaining walls, and bridges. The 1888 tunnel at Illinois Street was replaced with a level undercrossing, as were eleven former at-grade street crossings. The 1888 head house and office buildings were retained and remodeled. The train shed was replaced with a new one along the now-elevated tracks, while baggage, mail, and express buildings were all replaced. Station facilities at street level, including a new baggage tunnel under one street, were built under the new train shed.

As of December 31, 1927, the following companies were part of the 1883 joint agreement (as amended) that made up the Indianapolis Union Railway:

- Pennsylvania Railroad (PRR), through the operations of their Pittsburgh, Cincinnati, Chicago and St. Louis Railway Company (PCC&StL)
- Cleveland, Cincinnati, Chicago and St. Louis Railway Company (CCC&StL), also known as the Big Four; controlled by the New York Central (NYC)
- Baltimore & Ohio Railroad (B&O), through the operations of their Cincinnati, Indianapolis and Western Railroad Company (CI&W)
- Chicago, Indianapolis and Louisville Railway Company (CI&L), better known as the Monon Line (MON)
- New York, Chicago and St. Louis Railroad Company (NYC&StL), better known as the Nickel Plate Road (NKP)
- Illinois Central Railroad Company (IC)

By 1935, the corporate structure of the Indianapolis Union Railroad Company had changed. It was still an Indiana corporation, but ownership of its stock was divided between just two railroads, with the PCC&StL (PRR) holding 60% of the stock and the CCC&StL (NYC) holding the remaining 40%. The other railroads operating in Indianapolis at the time no longer had any equity stake, but continued to pay rent to the IU for their joint use of the company's facilities. At this time, the IU owned Indianapolis' Union Station (and its appurtenances) along with 1.769 miles (2.847 km) of main line trackage.

=== 1950 to present day ===
When the Pennsylvania Railroad merged with the New York Central to form the Penn Central Railroad (PC) in 1968, 100% control of the Indianapolis Union Railway passed to the new entity. Upon Penn Central's bankruptcy in 1970, and subsequent reorganization into Conrail (CR) by 1976, control of the IU passed once again. Finally, when Conrail was broken up and sold in 1999, the Indianapolis Union Railway became a part of CSX Transportation, which began operating it the next year. CSX is the successor to the B&O and the Monon, two of the lines that gave up partial interest in the IU during the Great Depression of the 1930s.
