= Central Indiana & Western Railroad =

Railway line in Indiana

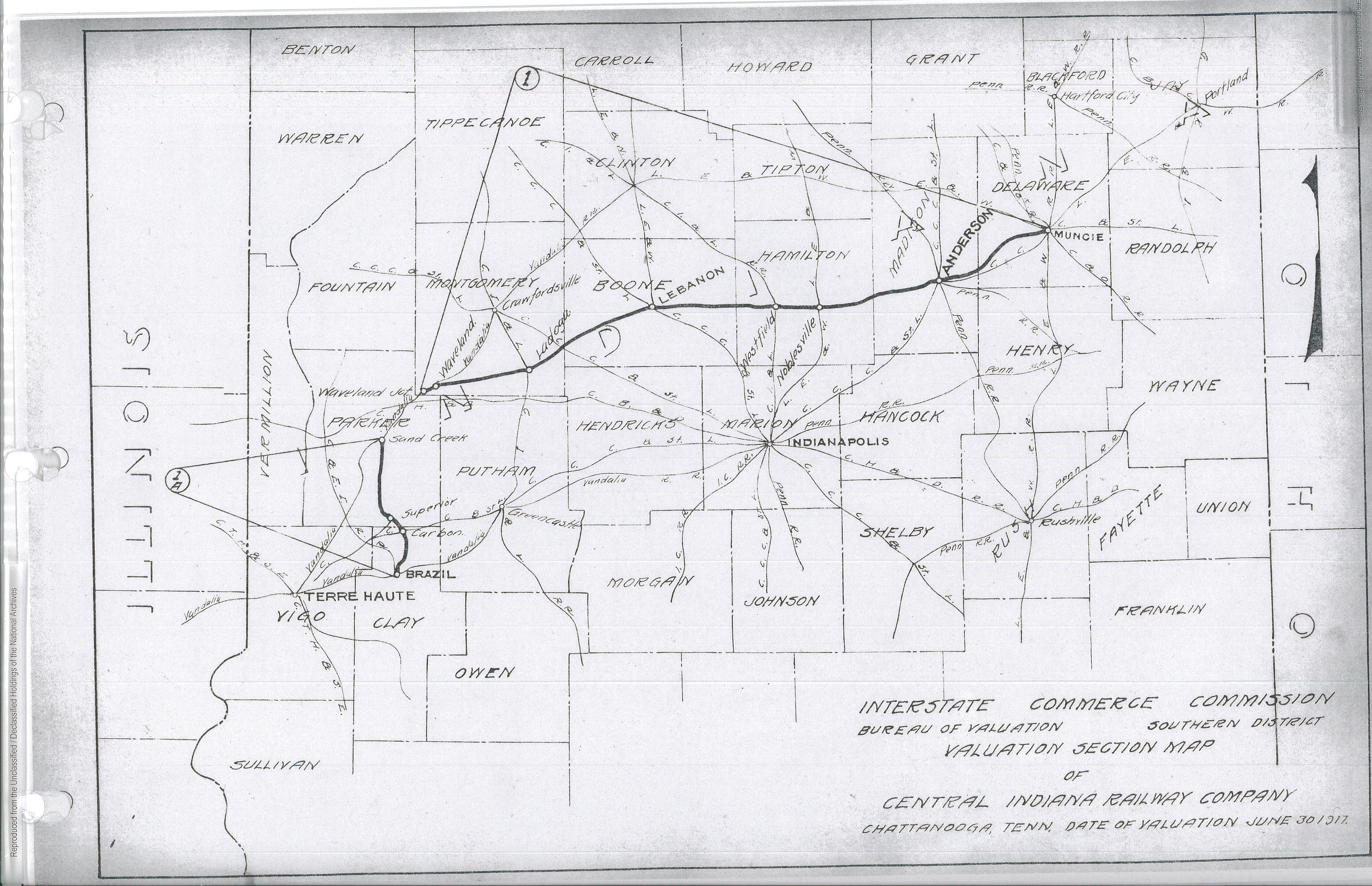
- 1918 map of the Central Indiana Railway

Overview
- Reporting mark: CEIW
- Locale: east-central Indiana

Technical
- Track gauge: 4 ft 8 1/2 in (1,435 mm) standard gauge
- Length: 7 miles (11 km)

The Central Indiana & Western Railroad (reporting mark CEIW) is a short-line switching and terminal railroad in southwestern Madison County in Indiana. It branches off a CSX line near the city of Anderson and runs approximately seven miles west-southwest, terminating at Lapel near the western border of the county.

About three miles of operation are on CSX. The line was formerly part of the Central Indiana Railway, which had been jointly owned by the New York Central Railroad and Pennsylvania Railroad.

The primary traffic is glass-making materials and shipped from South Anderson Yard to Lapel. In addition the CEIW built a track in Anderson at Recycled Polymer Solutions to handle tank cars for trans-loading. They also receive railcars with plastic for Recycled Polymer Solutions
