= Cincinnati, Indianapolis, St. Louis and Chicago Railway =

Railroad in the United States

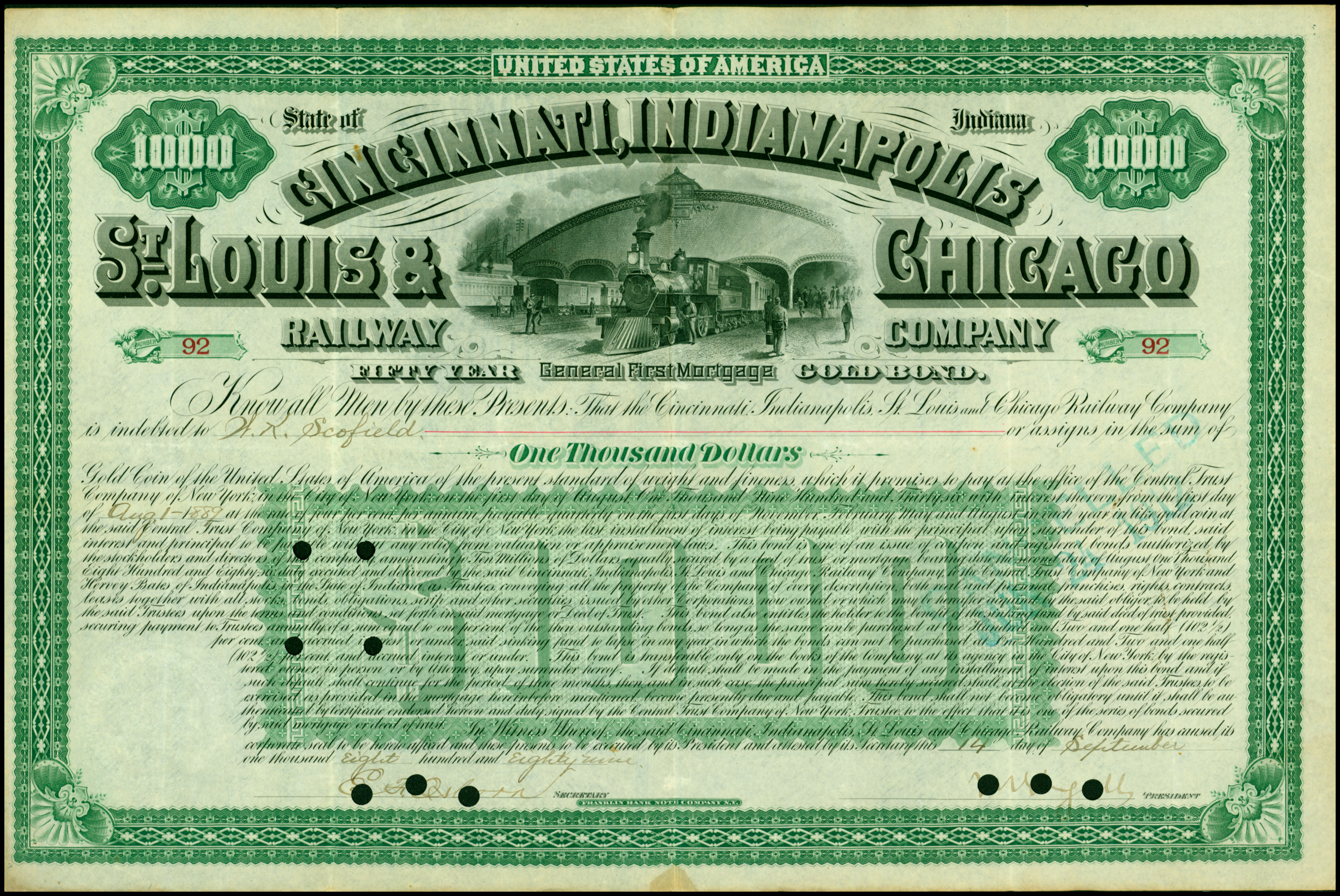
- Gold Bond of the Cincinnati, Indianapolis, St. Louis and Chicago Railway, issued 14. September 1889

Overview
- Locale: Illinois, Indiana, & Ohio
- Dates of operation: 1867–1889
- Predecessors: Indianapolis and Cincinnati Railroad, Lafayette and Indianapolis Railroad, Cincinnati and Indiana Railroad
- Successor: Cleveland, Cincinnati, Chicago and St. Louis Railway

The Cincinnati, Indianapolis, St. Louis and Chicago Railway (CISL&C) was a railroad in the United States.

The CISL&C resulted from the 1880 corporate restructuring of the bankrupt Indianapolis, Cincinnati and Lafayette Railroad (IC&L). The CISL&C operated a railroad line from Cincinnati via Indianapolis to Lafayette, being the result of an 1867 merger of the Indianapolis and Cincinnati Railroad (I&C), the Lafayette and Indianapolis Railroad (L&I), and the Cincinnati and Indiana Railroad (C&I). The three predecessor companies had been founded in 1850, 1846, and 1861, respectively.

The CISL&C controlled and operated numerous subsidiary railway companies operating smaller branch lines. These included:

- Cincinnati, Lafayette and Chicago Railroad, which ran from Templeton, Indiana, to Kenkakee, Illinois. Most notably, through service (1872) with the Illinois Central Railroad via Kankakee, Illinois, eventually became the only Amtrak service that utilized Central Station in Chicago. (Amtrak moved to Union Station in 1972)
- Columbus, Hope and Greensburg Railroad from Columbus, Indiana, to Greensburg, Indiana
- Harrison Branch Railroad

In 1889, the railway merged with the Cleveland, Columbus, Cincinnati and Indianapolis Railway and the Indianapolis and St Louis Railway to form the Cleveland, Cincinnati, Chicago and St. Louis Railway, also known collectively as the Big Four.
