= Fort Wayne and Jackson Railroad =

Railroad in Indiana and Michigan

Overview
- Dates of operation: 1879–1976
- Predecessor: Fort Wayne, Jackson and Saginaw Railroad
- Successor: City of Auburn Port Authority; Conrail; Hillsdale County Railway

Technical
- Track gauge: 1,435 mm (4 ft 8 1/2 in)
- Length: 97.6 miles (157.1 km)

The Fort Wayne and Jackson Railroad was a railway company in the United States. It was incorporated in 1879 to reorganize the Fort Wayne, Jackson and Saginaw Railroad, which owned a railway line between Fort Wayne, Indiana, and Jackson, Michigan. The Lake Shore and Michigan Southern Railway leased the company in 1882. Most of the company's line has been abandoned.

== History ==
The precursor of the Fort Wayne and Jackson Railroad was the Fort Wayne, Jackson and Saginaw Railroad, which was incorporated on January 26, 1869. That company consolidated two older companies, the Jackson, Fort Wayne and Cincinnati Railroad of Michigan and the Fort Wayne, Jackson and Saginaw Railroad of Indiana. Construction began the same year, and the company completed a 35.4-mile (57.0 km) from Jackson, Michigan, to Reading, Michigan, on November 22, 1869. A further 20.4 miles (32.8 km) from Reading to Angola, Indiana, was completed on January 17, 1870. The final 41.8 miles (67.3 km) from Angola to Fort Wayne, Indiana, was finished on December 5, 1870.

Lake Shore and Michigan Southern Railway leased the company in 1882. This lease was later assumed by the New York Central Railroad (1915) and Penn Central Transportation (1968).

Much of line was abandoned in 1973, following the Penn Central bankruptcy:

- Waterloo, Indiana–Pleasant Lake, Indiana
- Jonesville, Michigan–Bankers, Michigan
- Haires, Michigan–Horton, Michigan

These abandonments left four sections of the old line: yard trackage within Jackson, a branch from Jonesville to Horton, a branch from Bankers to Pleasant Lake, and a branch from Fort Wayne to Waterloo. In 1976, several small sections within the vicinity of Fort Wayne, Jackson, and Waterloo were conveyed to Conrail. The lines between Jonesville and Horton, and Auburn and Waterloo, saw little traffic and was abandoned. The new short-line railroad Hillsdale County Railway took over the section between Bankers and Pleasant Lake. In 1981, the city of Auburn established the City of Auburn Port Authority to purchase the remaining 1.7 miles (2.7 km) that connected the city with the Baltimore and Ohio Railroad, and then leased the line to the B&O (now CSX Transportation).
