= Peoria and Eastern Railway =

US railroad

Peoria and Eastern Railway (red) and New York Central system (orange) as of 1918

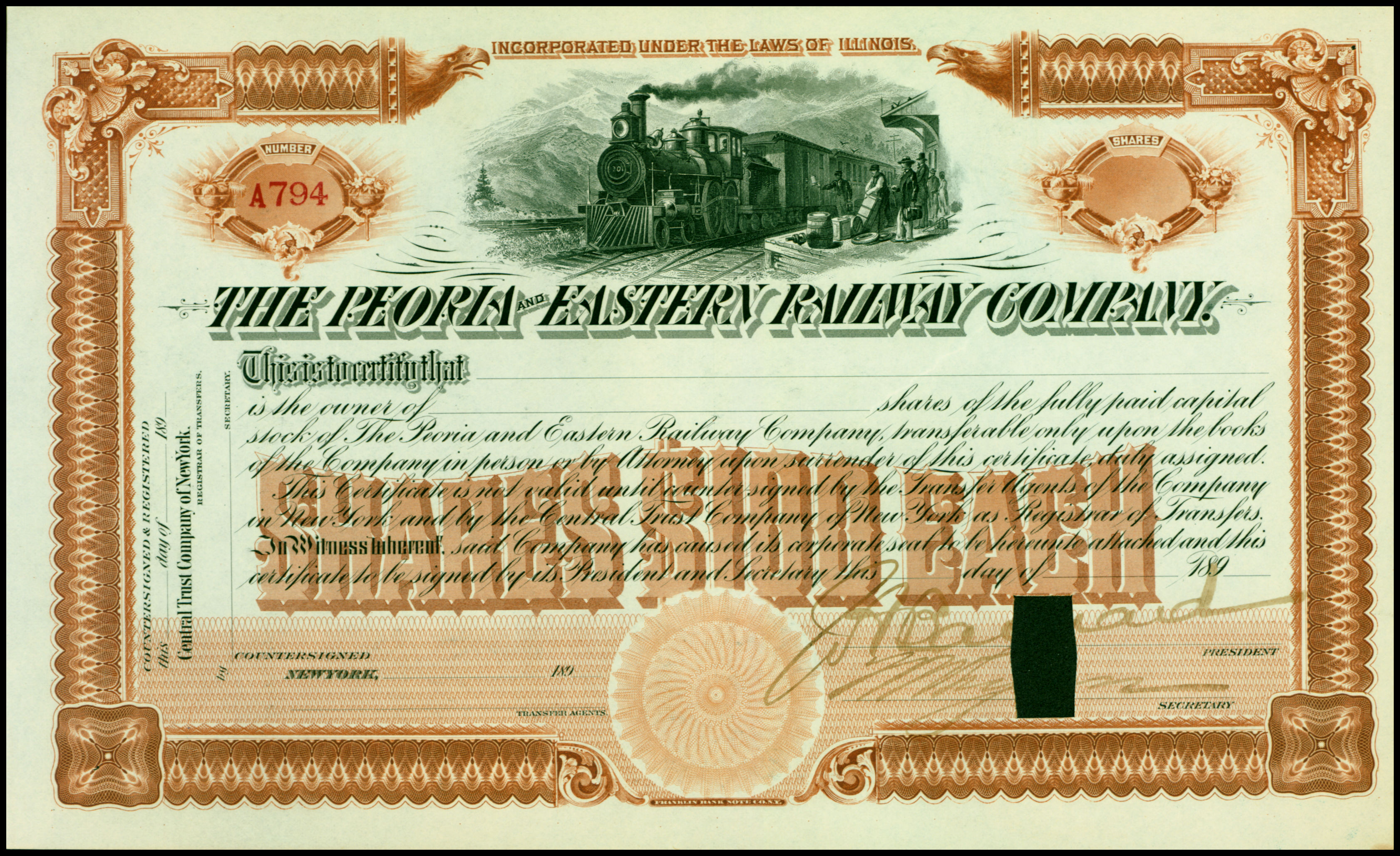
Share of the Peoria and Eastern Railway from the 1890s, unissued

The Peoria and Eastern Railway was incorporated on February 21, 1890, for the purpose of constructing or acquiring a railway between Pekin, Illinois, and Indianapolis, Indiana. The following day, the company acquired such a railroad from Charles H. Coster and Samuel Spencer, who had purchased the railroad in a foreclosure sale of the Ohio, Indiana and Western Railway, which had become insolvent the previous year. On the same day, the company entered into an agreement with the Cleveland, Cincinnati, Chicago and St. Louis Railway, surrendering operation and control of the railroad to that company, also known as the "Big Four".
