= Michigan Southern Railroad (1989) =

Overview
- Headquarters: Peoria, Illinois
- Reporting mark: MSO
- Locale: Southern Michigan
- Dates of operation: 1989–Present
- Predecessor: Conrail

Technical
- Track gauge: 4 ft 8 1/2 in (1,435 mm) standard gauge
- Length: 17.09 miles

Other
- Website: pioneerlines.com/the-michigan-southern-railroad-company-mso/

The Michigan Southern Railroad (reporting mark MSO), founded in 1989 and owned by Pioneer Railcorp since 1999, operates a portion of the former Michigan Southern Railroad (1846-1855) between White Pigeon and Sturgis, Michigan, United States. At White Pigeon, the line connects with the Grand Elk. Until 2012, the line connected with the Indiana Northeastern Railroad in Sturgis, when Indiana Northeastern abandoned a portion of their line between Batavia and Sturgis.

The main commodities hauled on the line include scrap, paper, coal, lumber, sand, and soybean oil.
