= List of Illinois railroads =

The following railroads are operating in the U.S. state of Illinois.

== Active railroads ==
=== Common carrier freight railroads ===
Railroad	Marks	Notes	Type
A&R Terminal Railroad	ART		
AgRail	AGRL		
Ag Valley Railroad	AVRR		
Alton and Southern Railway	ALS		
Belt Railway of Chicago	BRC		
Bloomer Line	BLOL		
BNSF Railway	BNSF		
Burlington Junction Railway	BJRY	also operates City of Rochelle Railroad (CIR)	
Canadian National Railway	CN	through subsidiaries Chicago Central and Pacific Railroad (CC), Elgin, Joliet and Eastern Railway (EJE), Grand Trunk Western Railroad (GTW), Illinois Central Railroad (IC), and Wisconsin Central Ltd. (WC)	
Canadian Pacific Kansas City	CPKC	through subsidiaries Dakota, Minnesota and Eastern Railroad (DME) and Soo Line Railroad (SOO)	
Chicago–Chemung Railroad	CCUO		
Chicago Port Railroad	CPC		
Chicago Rail Link	CRL		
Chicago South Shore and South Bend Railroad	CSS		
Cicero Central Railroad	CCER		
Coffeen and Western Railroad	CAEG		
Crab Orchard and Egyptian Railroad	COER		
CSX Transportation	CSXT	including subsidiary Baltimore and Ohio Chicago Terminal Railroad (BOCT)	
Decatur Central Railroad			
Decatur & Eastern Illinois Railroad	DREI		
Decatur Junction Railway	DT		
Eastern Illinois Railroad	EIRC		
Effingham Railroad	EFRR		
Evansville Western Railway	EVWR		
FFG&C Railroad	FFGC		
Great Lakes Terminal Railway	GLTR		
Hussey Terminal Railroad	HTRC	not operating	
Illinois Railway	IR		
Illinois and Midland Railroad	IMRR		
Illinois Western Railroad	ILW		
Indiana Harbor Belt Railroad	IHB		
Indiana Rail Road	INRD		
Iowa Interstate Railroad	IAIS	operates Lincoln and Southern Railroad	
Joppa and Eastern Railroad	JE		
Kankakee, Beaverville and Southern Railroad	KBSR		
Kansas City Southern Railway	KCS	including subsidiary Gateway Eastern Railway (GWWE)	
Keokuk Junction Railway	KJRY		
KM Railways	KMR		
Manufacturers' Junction Railway	MJ	not operating	
Norfolk Southern Railway	NS		
Peru Industrial Railroad	PIRR		
Pioneer Industrial Railway	PRY		
Port Harbor Railroad	PHRR		
Riverport Railroad	RVPR		
Shawnee Terminal Railway	STR	not operating	
South Chicago and Indiana Harbor Railway	SCIH		
Tazewell and Peoria Railroad	TZPR	operates Peoria and Pekin Union Railway (PPU)	
Terminal Railroad Association of St. Louis	TRRA		
Toledo, Peoria and Western Railway	TPW		
Union Pacific Railroad	UP	including subsidiary Southern Illinois and Missouri Bridge Company	
Vandalia Railroad	VRRC		
Vermilion Valley Railroad	VVRR	operates FNG Logistics Company (FNG)	
Wisconsin and Southern Railroad	WSOR		

=== Private freight carriers ===
Railroad	Marks	Notes
ADM Milling	ADMX	
Aux Sable Midstream		
Bulkmatic Railroad		
Buzzi Unicem		
Centerpoint Transportation, LLC		Operates the Joliet Terminal Railroad
Hoffman Transportation	HTCX	
Ingredion		
Kaskaskia Regional Port District	KKRX	
Mars Candy		
Material Sciences Corporation		
Mokena Illinois Railroad		
R Bult Rail Lines		

=== Passenger carriers ===
Railroad	Marks
Amtrak	AMTK
Chicago Transit Authority	CTA
Fox River Trolley Museum	
Illinois Railway Museum	IRMX
Metra	METX
MetroLink	BSDA
Monticello Railway Museum	MRMZ
Silver Creek and Stephenson Railroad	
South Shore Line	NICD

=== Proposed railroads ===
- 505 Railroad
- Beecher Industrial Railway
- Crete Terminal Railroad
- Eastern Joliet Railway
- Great Lakes Basin Transportation

.0

== Defunct railroads ==
Name	Mark	System (Note: This is one or more of the Class I railroads that the railroad became part of, if any.)	From	To	Successor	Notes
Addison RR		IC	1890	1892	Chicago, Madison & Northern RR	
Albany RR Bridge Co.		CNW	1857	1909	Chicago & North Western Ry	
Alton RR	A	GM&O	1931	1947	Gulf, Mobile & Ohio RR	
Alton & Eastern RR		ITC	1925	1937	Illinois Terminal RR	
Alton & St. Louis RR		GM&O	1859	1899	Chicago & Alton RR	
Alton & Sangamon RR		GM&O	1847	1852	Chicago & Mississippi RR	
Alton & Southern RR		MP/ SSW	1910	1968	Alton & Southern Ry	
Alton & Southern Ry		MP/ SSW	1911	1913	Alton & Southern RR	
Alton Terminal Ry		ITC	1889	1937	Illinois Terminal RR	
American Bottom Lime, Marble & Coal Co.			1857	1873	East St. Louis & Carondelet Ry	
American Central Ry		CB&Q	1859	1899	Chicago, Burlington & Quincy RR	
Ashdale & Thomson Ry		MILW	1902	1903	Chicago, Milwaukee & St. Paul Ry	
Atchison, Topeka & Santa Fe RR		ATSF	1889	1895	Atchison, Topeka & Santa Fe Ry	
Atchison, Topeka & Santa Fe RR in Chicago		ATSF	1887	1902	Atchison, Topeka & Santa Fe Ry	
Atchison, Topeka & Santa Fe Ry	ATSF	ATSF	1895	1996	BNSF Ry	
Atlanta & Lawndale RR		GM&O	1905	1915	Chicago & Alton RR	
Atlantic & Pacific RR		MILW	1865	1872	Chicago & Pacific RR	
Aurora Branch RR		CB&Q	1849	1852	Chicago & Aurora RR	
Baltimore & Ohio RR	B&O, BO	B&O	1874	1987	Chesapeake & Ohio Ry	
Baltimore & Ohio & Chicago RR		B&O	1876	1949	Baltimore & Ohio RR	
Baltimore & Ohio Connecting RR		B&O	1892	1990	CSX Transportation	
Baltimore & Ohio Southwestern RR		B&O	1899	1949	Baltimore & Ohio RR	
Baltimore & Ohio Southwestern Ry		B&O	1893	1899	St. Louis, Springfield & Vincennes Ry	
Baltimore, Pittsburgh & Chicago Ry		B&O	1873	1876	Baltimore & Ohio & Chicago RR	
Belleville & Carondelet RR		IC	1881	1897	St. Louis, Alton & Terre Haute RR	
Belleville, Centralia & Eastern RR		SOU	1889	1889	Louisville, Evansville & St. Louis Consolidated RR	
Belleville City Ry		IC	1867	1895	St. Louis, Belleville & Southern Ry	
Belleville & Eldorado RR		IC	1861	1897	St. Louis, Alton & Terre Haute RR	
Belleville & Illinoistown RR		NYC	1849	1856	Terre Haute, Alton & St. Louis RR	
Belleville & O'Fallon RR		L&N	1869	1871	St. Louis & Southeastern Ry	
Belleville & Southern Illinois RR		IC	1857	1897	St. Louis, Alton & Terre Haute RR	
Benton Southern RR		IC	1915	1946	Illinois Central RR	
Bloomington & Ohio River RR		WAB	1869	1872	Chicago & Paducah RR	
Bloomington & Pekin RR		NYC	1853	1867	Danville, Urbana, Bloomington & Pekin RR	
Blue Island RR		IC	1891	1987	Northeast Illinois Regional Commuter RR Corp.	
Bridgeport & South Chicago RR		B&O	1887	1890	Chicago & Northern Pacific RR	
Bureau County Mineral Ry		MILW	1904	1909	Rochelle & Southern Ry	
Burlington, Monmouth & Illinois River Ry		MSTL	1875	1881	Peoria & Farmington Ry	
Burlington Northern Inc.	BN		1970	1981	Burlington Northern RR	
Burlington Northern RR	BN		1981	1996	BNSF Ry	
Cairo & St. Louis RR		GM&O	1865	1881	St. Louis & Cairo RR	
Cairo Terminal RR	CTML		1982	1996	Shawnee Terminal Ry	
Cairo & Thebes RR		MP	1905	1956	Missouri Pacific RR	
Cairo & Vincennes RR		NYC	1867	1880	Cairo & Vincennes Ry	
Cairo & Vincennes Ry		NYC	1880	1881	Wabash, St. Louis & Pacific Ry	
Cairo, Vincennes & Chicago Ry		NYC	1889	1913	Cleveland, Cincinnati, Chicago & St. Louis Ry	
Calumet & Blue Island Ry		EJ&E	1889	1897	Chicago, Lake Shore & Eastern Ry	
Calumet, Hammond & Southeastern RR			1906	1919	Chicago Short Line Ry	
Calumet River Ry		PRR	1883	1901	South Chicago & Southern RR	
Calumet & Southeastern RR			1902	1909	Chicago, West Pullman & Southern RR	
Calumet Western Ry		NYC/ PRR/ RI	1897			still exists as a nonoperating subsidiary of Chicago Rail Link
Camanche, Albany & Mendota RR		CB&Q	1856	1859	Illinois Grand Trunk Ry	
Carbondale & Shawneetown RR		IC	1869	1897	St. Louis, Alton & Terre Haute RR	
Carthage & Burlington RR		CB&Q	1867	1899	Chicago, Burlington & Quincy RR	
Casey & Kansas RR			1926	1937	N/A	
Central Illinois Ry			1905	1906	Chicago & Illinois Midland Ry	
Central Illinois & Wisconsin Ry		MILW	1880	1900	Chicago, Milwaukee & St. Paul Ry	
Central Iowa Ry		MSTL	1882	1886	Iowa Central Ry	
Central Military Tract RR		CB&Q	1851	1856	Chicago, Burlington & Quincy RR	
Central Terminal Ry		CP	1911	1987	Soo Line RR	
Central Wisconsin RR	CWRC		1982	1985	Wisconsin & Calumet RR	
Centralia & Altamont RR		MP	1889	1894	Centralia & Chester RR	
Centralia & Chester RR		MP	1883	1900	Illinois Southern Ry	
Centralia & Sandoval RR		CB&Q	1909	1917	Chicago, Burlington & Quincy RR	
Champaign, Havana & Western Ry		IC	1879	1880	Wabash, St. Louis & Pacific Ry	
Champaign & Southeastern Ry		WAB	1880	1903	Wabash RR	
Charleston, Neoga & St. Louis RR		NKP	1880	1881	Toledo, Cincinnati & St. Louis RR	
Chesapeake & Ohio Ry	C&O, CO	C&O	1921	1987	CSX Transportation	
Chesapeake & Ohio Ry of Indiana		C&O	1910	1934	Chesapeake & Ohio Ry	
Chester & Iron Mountain RR		MP		1873	Iron Mountain, Chester & Eastern RR	
Chester & Kaskaskia RR		MP	1877	1878	Wabash, Chester & Western RR	
Chester & Mount Vernon RR		MP	1927	1956	Missouri Pacific RR	
Chester & Tamaroa Coal & RR Co.		MP	1869	1873	Iron Mountain, Chester & Eastern RR	
Chicago & Alton RR	C&A	GM&O	1861	1931	Alton RR	
Chicago & Alton Ry		GM&O	1900	1906	Chicago & Alton RR	
Chicago, Alton & St. Louis RR		GM&O	1855	1856	St. Louis, Alton & Chicago RR	
Chicago & Atlantic Ry		ERIE	1873	1890	Chicago & Erie RR	
Chicago & Atlantic Extension Ry		ERIE	1873	1873	Chicago & Atlantic Ry	
Chicago & Aurora RR		CB&Q	1852	1855	Chicago, Burlington & Quincy RR	
Chicago, Burlington & Northern RR		CB&Q	1885	1899	Chicago, Burlington & Quincy RR	
Chicago, Burlington & Quincy RR	CB&Q, CBQ	CB&Q	1855	1970	Burlington Northern Inc.	
Chicago, Burlington & Quincy Ry		CB&Q	1901	1907	N/A	operated the Chicago, Burlington & Quincy RR under lease, but did not own any railroad
Chicago & Calumet River RR			1901	1956	N/A	
Chicago & Calumet Terminal Ry		B&O	1886	1898	Chicago Terminal Transfer RR	
Chicago & Canada Southern Ry			1871	1888	N/A	sold at foreclosure; no property in Illinois
Chicago & Carbondale RR		IC	1895	1895	Chicago & Texas RR	
Chicago Central Ry		B&O	1889	1891	Chicago & Northern Pacific RR	
Chicago, Cincinnati & Louisville RR		C&O	1907	1910	Chesapeake & Ohio Ry of Indiana	
Chicago, Danville & St. Louis RR		C&EI	1887	1887	Chicago & Eastern Illinois RR	
Chicago, Danville & Vincennes RR		C&EI	1865	1877	Chicago & Nashville RR	
Chicago & Eastern Illinois RR	C&EI, CEI	C&EI	1940	1976	Missouri Pacific RR	
Chicago & Eastern Illinois RR		C&EI	1877	1922	Chicago & Eastern Illinois Ry	
Chicago & Eastern Illinois Ry	C&EI	C&EI	1922	1940	Chicago & Eastern Illinois RR	
Chicago & Erie RR		ERIE	1890	1941	Erie RR	
Chicago & Evanston RR		MILW	1861	1885	Chicago, Evanston & Lake Superior Ry	
Chicago, Evanston & Lake Superior Ry		MILW	1885	1900	Chicago, Milwaukee & St. Paul Ry	
Chicago & Grand Trunk Ry		CN	1880	1900	Chicago Lake County Ry	
Chicago & Great Eastern Ry		PRR	1863	1868	Columbus, Chicago & Indiana Central Ry	
Chicago Great Western RR	CGW	CGW	1909	1941	Chicago Great Western Ry	
Chicago & Great Western RR		B&O	1873	1890	Chicago & Northern Pacific RR	
Chicago Great Western Ry	CGW	CGW	1941	1968	Chicago & North Western Ry	
Chicago Great Western Ry		CGW	1892	1909	Chicago Great Western RR	
Chicago, Hammond & Western RR		NYC	1896	1898	Chicago Junction Ry	
Chicago, Harlem & Batavia Ry		B&O	1885	1890	Chicago & Northern Pacific RR	
Chicago, Havana & Western RR		IC	1886	1902	Illinois Central RR	
Chicago Heights & Northern Ry		EJ&E		1897	Elgin, Joliet & Eastern Ry	
Chicago Heights Terminal Transfer RR	CHTT	C&EI	1898			still exists as a subsidiary of the Union Pacific RR
Chicago & Illinois Midland Ry	C&IM, CIM		1906	1996	Illinois & Midland RR	
Chicago & Illinois River RR		GM&O	1867	1879	Chicago & Alton RR	
Chicago & Illinois Southern RR		IC	1877			
Chicago & Illinois Southern RR		IC	1871	1872	Chicago & Illinois Southern Ry	
Chicago & Illinois Southern Ry		IC	1872	1876	Grayville & Mattoon RR	
Chicago & Illinois Western RR	C&IW, CIW	IC	1903		Illinois Central RR	
Chicago & Indiana RR	CINR		1979	1979	N/A	
Chicago, Indiana & Southern RR		NYC	1906	1914	New York Central RR	
Chicago & Indiana State Line Ry		NYC	1880	1898	Chicago Junction Ry	
Chicago, Indianapolis & Louisville Ry	CI&L, CIL	MON	1897	1956	Monon RR	
Chicago, Indianapolis & St. Louis Short Line Ry		NYC	1903	1913	Cleveland, Cincinnati, Chicago & St. Louis Ry	
Chicago & Iowa RR		CB&Q	1869	1899	Chicago, Burlington & Quincy RR	
Chicago Junction Ry		NYC	1898	1958	Chicago River & Indiana RR	
Chicago & Kenosha Ry		EJ&E	1889	1913	Illinois Steel Co.	
Chicago Lake County Ry		CN	1900	1900	Grand Trunk Western Ry	
Chicago & Lake Huron RR		CN	1873	1879	North Western Grand Trunk Ry	
Chicago, Lake Shore & Eastern Ry		EJ&E	1897	1938	Elgin, Joliet & Eastern Ry	
Chicago & Lake Superior RR		MILW	1883	1885	Chicago, Evanston & Lake Superior Ry	
Chicago, Madison & Northern RR			1980	1982	Central Wisconsin RR	
Chicago, Madison & Northern RR		IC	1886	1903	Illinois Central RR	
Chicago, Millington & Western Ry			1872			
Chicago & Milwaukee RR		CNW	1853	1863	Chicago & Milwaukee Ry	
Chicago & Milwaukee Ry		CNW	1863	1881	Chicago, Milwaukee & North Western Ry	
Chicago, Milwaukee & Gary Ry	CM&G	MILW	1908	1930	Chicago, Milwaukee, St. Paul & Pacific RR	
Chicago, Milwaukee & North Western Ry		CNW	1881	1883	Chicago & North Western Ry	
Chicago, Milwaukee & St. Paul Ry		MILW	1872	1928	Chicago, Milwaukee, St. Paul & Pacific RR	
Chicago, Milwaukee, St. Paul & Pacific RR	MILW	MILW	1928	1985	The Milwaukee Road, Inc.	
Chicago & Mississippi RR		GM&O	1852	1855	Chicago, Alton & St. Louis RR	
Chicago, Missouri & Western Ry	CMNW		1987	1990	SPCSL Corp.	
Chicago & Nashville RR		C&EI	1877	1877	Chicago & Eastern Illinois RR	
Chicago & North Western Ry	CNW	CNW	1859	1972	Chicago & North Western Transportation Co.	
Chicago & North Western Transportation Co.	CNW	CNW	1972	1995	Union Pacific RR	
Chicago & North Wisconsin Ry		CB&Q	1883	1887	Chicago, Burlington & Northern RR	
Chicago Northern Ry		CNW	1902	1903	Chicago & North Western Ry	
Chicago & Northern Pacific RR		B&O	1889	1896	Chicago Terminal Transfer RR	
Chicago & Ohio River RR		B&O	1873	1893	Peoria, Decatur & Evansville Ry	
Chicago & Pacific RR		MILW	1872	1900	Chicago, Milwaukee & St. Paul Ry	
Chicago & Paducah RR		WAB	1872	1880	Wabash, St. Louis & Pacific Ry	
Chicago, Paducah & Memphis RR		C&EI	1893	1897	Chicago & Eastern Illinois RR	
Chicago, Palatine & Wauconda RR			1921	1924	N/A	
Chicago, Pekin & Southwestern RR		ATSF	1869	1881	Chicago, St. Louis & Western RR	
Chicago, Peoria & St. Louis RR			1909	1924	Springfield, Havana & Peoria RR	
Chicago, Peoria & St. Louis Ry			1888	1896	Chicago, Peoria & St. Louis RR of Illinois	
Chicago, Peoria & St. Louis RR of Illinois			1896	1900	Chicago, Peoria & St. Louis Ry of Illinois	
Chicago, Peoria & St. Louis Ry of Illinois			1900	1912	Chicago, Peoria & St. Louis RR	
Chicago, Peoria & Western Ry			1898			still exists as a lessor of the Belt Railway of Chicago
Chicago & Plainfield RR		ATSF	1859	1869	Chicago, Plainfield & Pekin RR	
Chicago, Plainfield & Pekin RR		ATSF	1869	1869	Chicago, Pekin & Southwestern RR	
Chicago Produce Terminal Co.	CPTC		1929	1977	N/A	
Chicago River & Indiana RR	CRI	NYC	1904	1976	Conrail	
Chicago & Rock Island RR		RI	1851	1866	Chicago, Rock Island & Pacific RR	
Chicago, Rock Island & Pacific RR	RI, ROCK	RI	1948	1980	Peoria & Pekin Union Ry	
Chicago, Rock Island & Pacific RR		RI	1866	1880	Chicago, Rock Island & Pacific Ry	
Chicago, Rock Island & Pacific Ry	RI	RI	1880	1948	Chicago, Rock Island & Pacific RR	
Chicago & Rock River RR		CB&Q	1869	1899	Chicago, Burlington & Quincy RR	
Chicago, Rockford & Northern RR		CB&Q	1874	1892	Chicago & Iowa RR	
Chicago & St. Louis Ry		ATSF	1885	1886	Chicago, Santa Fe & California Ry	
Chicago, St. Charles & Mississippi Air Line RR		CNW	1853	1855	Galena & Chicago Union RR	
Chicago, St. Louis & Ohio River RR		IC	1900	1901	St. Louis & Ohio River RR	
Chicago, St. Louis & Paducah Ry		IC	1887	1897	St. Louis, Alton & Terre Haute RR	
Chicago, St. Louis & Pittsburgh RR		PRR	1883	1890	Pittsburgh, Cincinnati, Chicago & St. Louis Ry	
Chicago, St. Louis & Western RR		ATSF	1882	1885	Chicago & St. Louis Ry	
Chicago, St. Paul & Fond du Lac RR		CNW	1855	1859	Chicago & North Western Ry	
Chicago & Santa Fe RR				1889		
Chicago, Santa Fe & California Ry		ATSF	1886	1900	Atchison, Topeka & Santa Fe Ry	
Chicago Short Line Ry	CSL		1900	2002	South Chicago & Indiana Harbor Ry	
Chicago South Branch Dock Co.		B&O	1859	1888	Bridgeport & South Chicago RR	
Chicago South Shore & South Bend RR	CSS		1925			
Chicago & Southern RR		CN	1874	1878	Chicago & State Line Ry	
Chicago & Southeastern Ry		EJ&E	1889	1913	Illinois Steel Co.	
Chicago Southern Ry		MILW	1904	1910	Chicago, Terre Haute & Southeastern Ry of Illinois	
Chicago & Southwestern RR		B&O	1890	1891	Chicago & Northern Pacific RR	
Chicago & Springfield RR		IC	1877	1902	Illinois Central RR	
Chicago, Springfield & St. Louis RR		IC	1883	1886	Litchfield & St. Louis Ry	
Chicago, Springfield & St. Louis Ry			1925	1942	Springfield & Southwestern RR	
Chicago & State Line RR		NKP	1887	1923	New York, Chicago & St. Louis RR	
Chicago & State Line Ry		CNW	1905	1905	Milwaukee & State Line Ry	
Chicago & State Line Ry		CN	1878	1879	North Western Grand Trunk Ry	
Chicago & Strawn Ry		WAB	1879	1880	Wabash, St. Louis & Pacific Ry	
Chicago Suburban Ry		MILW	1882	1898	Chicago, Evanston & Lake Superior Ry	
Chicago & Superior RR		MILW	1873	1880	Chicago, Milwaukee & St. Paul Ry	
Chicago Terminal RR	CTM		2007	2019	City of Chicago	
Chicago Terminal Transfer RR		B&O	1897	1910	Baltimore & Ohio Chicago Terminal RR	
Chicago, Terre Haute & Southeastern Ry	CTSE	MILW	1910	1921	Chicago, Milwaukee, St. Paul & Pacific RR	
Chicago, Terre Haute & Southeastern Ry of Illinois		MILW	1910	1910	Chicago, Terre Haute & Southeastern Ry	
Chicago & Texas RR		IC	1893	1902	Illinois Central RR	
Chicago & Tomah RR		CNW	1880	1880	Milwaukee & Madison Ry	
Chicago Union Station Co.	CUST	CB&Q/ MILW/ PRR	1915			still exists as a subsidiary of Amtrak
Chicago Union Transfer Ry		C&EI/ CN/ ERIE/ MON/ WAB	1888	1912	Chicago & Western Indiana RR	
Chicago, West Pullman & Southern RR	CWP		1909	1996	Chicago Rail Link	
Chicago, West Pullman & Southern Ry			1900	1909	Chicago, West Pullman & Southern RR	
Chicago & West Ridge RR				1893		
Chicago & Western Dummy Ry		B&O	1879	1885	Chicago, Harlem & Batavia Ry	
Chicago & Western Indiana RR	C&WI, CWI	C&EI/ CN/ ERIE/ MON/ WAB	1879			still exists as a nonoperating subsidiary of the Union Pacific RR
Chicago & Western Indiana Belt Ry		C&EI/ CN/ ERIE/ MON/ WAB	1881	1882	Chicago & Western Indiana RR	
Chicago & Wisconsin RR		CP	1884	1899	Wisconsin Central Ry	
Chicago, Zeigler & Gulf Ry			1902			
Christopher & Herrin RR		IC	1903	1903	Illinois Central RR	
Cincinnati, Hamilton & Dayton Ry		B&O	1905	1915	N/A	leased the Cincinnati, Indianapolis & Western Ry
Cincinnati, Indianapolis, St. Louis & Chicago Ry		NYC	1880	1889	Cleveland, Cincinnati, Chicago & St. Louis Ry	
Cincinnati, Indianapolis & Western RR	CIWN	B&O	1915	1990	CSX Transportation	
Cincinnati, Indianapolis & Western Ry		B&O	1902	1915	Sidell & Olney RR	
Cincinnati, Lafayette & Chicago RR		NYC	1871	1938	Cleveland, Cincinnati, Chicago & St. Louis Ry	
Cincinnati, Louisville & Vincennes Ry		B&O	1899	1899	Baltimore & Ohio Southwestern RR	
Cleveland, Cincinnati, Chicago & St. Louis Ry		NYC	1889	1976	Conrail	
Clinton, Bloomington & North Eastern Ry		IC	1878	1880	Kankakee & South Western RR	
Coal Belt Ry		MP	1903	1909	St. Louis, Iron Mountain & Southern Ry	
Collinsville & Troy RR		ITC	1899	1902	St. Louis, Troy & Eastern RR	
Columbus, Chicago & Indiana Central Ry		PRR	1868	1883	Chicago, St. Louis & Pittsburgh RR	
Conrail	CR		1976	1999	Norfolk Southern Ry	
Cook, Lake & McHenry Counties Ry		MILW	1899	1901	Chicago, Milwaukee & St. Paul Ry	
Danville & Grape Creek RR		C&EI	1880	1881	Chicago & Eastern Illinois RR	
Danville & Indiana Harbor RR		NYC	1905	1906	Chicago, Indiana & Southern RR	
Danville, Olney & Ohio River RR		B&O/ IC	1869	1886	Chicago & Ohio River RR	
Danville & Pekin Ry		NYC	1878	1879	Indiana, Bloomington & Western Ry	
Danville & Rosedale Ry		C&EI	1870	1872	Evansville, Terre Haute & Chicago Ry	
Danville & Southwestern RR		NYC	1879	1881	Wabash, St. Louis & Pacific Ry	
Danville, Tuscola & Western RR		C&EI	1887	1887	Chicago, Danville & St. Louis RR	
Danville, Urbana, Bloomington & Pekin RR		NYC	1867	1869	Indianapolis, Bloomington & Western Ry	
Davenport & Rock Island Ry Bridge Co.		CB&Q/ MILW	1884	1895	Davenport & Rock Island Bridge, Ry & Terminal Co.	
Davenport & Rock Island Bridge, Ry & Terminal Co.		CB&Q/ MILW	1895	1898	Davenport, Rock Island & North Western Ry	
Davenport, Rock Island & North Western Ry	DRI	CB&Q/ MILW	1898	1995	Soo Line RR	
Davenport, Rock Island & Northwestern Ry		CB&Q/ MILW	1900	1901	Davenport, Rock Island & North Western Ry	
Decatur & East St. Louis RR		WAB	1867	1870	Toledo, Wabash & Western Ry	
Decatur & Eastern Ry		B&O	1894	1895	Indiana, Decatur & Western Ry	
Decatur & Indianapolis RR		B&O	1853	1855	Indiana & Illinois Central Ry	
Decatur, Mattoon & Southern RR		IC	1878	1879	Peoria, Decatur & Evansville Ry	
Decatur, Sullivan & Mattoon RR		IC	1876	1877	Decatur, Mattoon & Southern RR	
Decatur, Sullivan & Mattoon RR		IC	1869	1872	Chicago & Illinois Southern Ry	
De Kalb & Great Western Ry		CGW	1895	1911	Chicago Great Western RR	
Denverside Connecting Ry		MP/ SSW	1910	1913	Alton & Southern RR	
De Pue, Ladd & Eastern RR		CNW	1888	1920	Chicago & North Western Ry	
Depue & Northern RR			1904			
Des Plaines Valley Ry		CNW	1909	1913	Chicago & North Western Ry	
Dixon, Peoria & Hannibal RR		CB&Q	1867	1899	Chicago, Burlington & Quincy RR	
Dixon & Quincy RR		CB&Q	1869	1899	Chicago, Burlington & Quincy RR	
Dixon, Rock Falls & Southwestern Electric Ry			1903	1913	Hooppole, Yorktown & Tampico RR	operated by steam locomotives
Dixon, Rockford & Kenosha Ry		CNW	1864	1864	Chicago & North Western Ry	
Dixon, Rockford & State Line RR		CNW	1864	1864	Dixon, Rockford & Kenosha Ry	
Dunleith & Dubuque Bridge Co.		IC	1857	1946	Illinois Central RR	
East St. Louis Belt RR			1898		Terminal RR Association of St. Louis	
East St. Louis & Carondelet Ry			1873		Terminal RR Association of St. Louis	
East St. Louis Connecting Ry			1878		Terminal RR Association of St. Louis	
East St. Louis Junction RR	ESLJ	CNW	1918			still exists as a lessor of the Union Pacific RR
East St. Louis, Madison & Granite City RR		SOU	1900	1904	Southern Ry	
East & West Illinois Ry		MP	1902	1902	St. Louis Valley Ry	
Eastern Illinois & Missouri RR		C&EI	1899	1899	Chicago & Eastern Illinois RR	
Eastern Illinois & St. Louis RR		C&EI	1903	1905	Chicago & Eastern Illinois RR	
Eldorado, Marion & Southwestern RR		MP	1906	1913	Marion & Eastern RR	
Electric City & Illinois Ry			1889	1891	Madison, Illinois & St. Louis Ry	
Elgin & State Line RR		CNW	1859	1883	Chicago & North Western Ry	
Englewood Connecting Ry		PRR	1885	1954	Penndel Co.	
Erie RR	ERIE	ERIE	1941	1960	Erie–Lackawanna RR	
Erie–Lackawanna RR	EL		1960	1968	Erie Lackawanna Ry	
Erie Lackawanna Ry	EL		1968	1976	Conrail	
Erie Western Ry	ERES		1977	1979	Chicago & Indiana RR	
Evansville, Mount Carmel & Northern Ry		NYC	1906	1938	Cleveland, Cincinnati, Chicago & St. Louis Ry	
Evansville & Southern Illinois Ry		L&N	1869	1871	St. Louis & Southeastern RR	
Evansville, Terre Haute & Chicago Ry		C&EI	1872	1899	Chicago & Eastern Illinois RR	
Fairbury, Pontiac & Northwestern Ry		WAB	1867	1872	Chicago & Paducah RR	
Fenton & Thomson RR		CB&Q	1903	1906	Chicago, Burlington & Quincy RR	
Fond du Lac, Amboy & Peoria Ry		MILW	1874	1883	Chicago, Milwaukee & St. Paul Ry	
Fort Wayne & Chicago RR		PRR	1853	1856	Pittsburgh, Fort Wayne & Chicago RR	
Fox River Valley RR		CNW	1852	1858	Elgin & State Line RR	
Franklin & Waverly Ry		CB&Q	1908	1917	Chicago, Burlington & Quincy RR	
Fredonia & Reeds RR		IC	1914	1946	Illinois Central RR	
Freeport, Dodgeville & Northern RR		IC	1887	1888	Chicago, Madison & Northern RR	
Fulton County Extension Ry		CB&Q	1881	1908	Fulton County Narrow Gauge Ry	
Fulton County Narrow Gauge Ry		CB&Q	1878	1908	Chicago, Burlington & Quincy RR	
Galena & Chicago Union RR		CNW	1836	1864	Chicago & North Western Ry	
Galena & Illinois River RR		PRR	1857	1863	Chicago & Great Eastern Ry	
Galena & Southern Wisconsin RR		CNW	1853	1879	Galena & Wisconsin RR	
Galena & Wisconsin RR		CNW	1879	1880	Chicago & Tomah RR	
Galesburg, Etherly & Eastern RR			1894	1898	Galesburg & Great Eastern RR	
Galesburg & Great Eastern RR			1898	1960	N/A	
Galesburg & Rio RR		CB&Q	1886	1899	Chicago, Burlington & Quincy RR	
Galesburg, Rockford & Northern RR			1917	1922	Hooppole, Yorktown & Tampico RR	
Gardner, Coal City & Northern Ry		EJ&E		1891	Elgin, Joliet & Eastern Ry	
Gateway Western Ry	GWWR		1990	2001	Kansas City Southern Ry	
Gilman, Clinton & Springfield RR		IC	1867	1877	Chicago & Springfield RR	
Grand Tower & Cape Girardeau RR		IC	1889	1893	Chicago & Texas RR	
Grand Tower & Carbondale RR		IC	1882	1893	Chicago & Texas RR	
Grand Tower Mining, Manufacturing & Transportation Co.		IC	1869	1882	Grand Tower & Carbondale RR	
Grand Trunk Junction Ry		CN	1880	1901	Grand Trunk Western Ry	
Grand Trunk Western Ry		CN	1900	1928	Grand Trunk Western RR	
Granite City & East St. Louis Terminal RR			1906			
Granite City & Madison Belt Line RR			1892		Terminal RR Association of St. Louis	
Grayville & Mattoon RR		IC	1876	1880	Peoria, Decatur & Evansville Ry	
Grayville & Mattoon RR		IC	1857	1871	Chicago & Illinois Southern RR	
Great Western RR		WAB	1853	1865	Toledo, Wabash & Western Ry	
Groves & Sand Ridge RR		IC	1902	1904	Illinois Central RR	
Gulf, Mobile & Ohio RR	GM&O, GMO	GM&O	1940	1972	Illinois Central Gulf RR	
Hamilton, Lacon & Eastern RR		GM&O	1867	1870	Chicago & Alton RR	
Hammond Belt Ry		C&O	1906		N/A	
Hammond & Blue Island RR		NYC	1893	1896	Chicago, Hammond & Western RR	
Hancock County Bridge Co.			1865	1868	Keokuk & Hamilton Bridge Co.	
Hannibal Bridge Co.		WAB	1869	1937	Wabash – Hannibal Bridge Co.	
Hannibal & Naples RR		WAB	1863	1877	Wabash Ry	
Hanover Ry			1906	1934	N/A	
Havana, Rantoul & Eastern RR		IC	1873	1887	LeRoy & Eastern RR	
Herrin Ry		MP	1903	1909	St. Louis, Iron Mountain & Southern Ry	
Herrin & Johnson City Ry		MP	1905	1909	St. Louis, Iron Mountain & Southern Ry	
Herrin Northern RR		IC	1915	1946	Illinois Central RR	
Herrin & Southern RR		CB&Q	1909	1914	Chicago, Burlington & Quincy RR	
Hooppole, Yorktown & Tampico RR	HY&T		1922	1953	N/A	
Hooppole, Yorktown & Tampico RR	HY&T		1913	1917	Galesburg, Rockford & Northern RR	
I&M Rail Link	IMRL		1997	2002	Iowa, Chicago & Eastern RR	
Illinois Central RR	IC	IC	1851	1972	Illinois Central Gulf RR	
Illinois Central Gulf RR	ICG		1972	1988	Illinois Central RR	
Illinois & Eastern RR		IC	1899	1899	Illinois & Indiana RR	
Illinois Farmers' RR		CB&Q	1867	1872	Jacksonville, North Western & South Eastern Ry	
Illinois Grand Trunk Ry		CB&Q	1859	1899	Chicago, Burlington & Quincy RR	
Illinois & Indiana RR		IC	1899	1906	Indianapolis Southern RR	
Illinois, Iowa & Minnesota Ry		MILW	1902	1908	Chicago, Milwaukee & Gary Ry	
Illinois Midland Ry			1913	1967	N/A	
Illinois Midland Ry		PRR	1874	1886	Terre Haute & Peoria RR	
Illinois & Mississippi Valley Terminal RR		ITC	1899	1899	Illinois Terminal RR	
Illinois–Missouri Terminal Ry	ITC	ITC	1954	1956	Illinois Terminal RR	
Illinois Northern RR	IN	ATSF	1901	1975	Atchison, Topeka & Santa Fe Ry	
Illinois Parallel RR		CNW	1851	1853	Chicago & Milwaukee RR	
Illinois RailNet	IR		1997	2005	Illinois Ry	
Illinois River RR			1853	1864	Peoria, Pekin & Jacksonville RR	
Illinois & St. Louis Bridge Co.			1867	1878	St. Louis Bridge Co.	
Illinois & St. Louis RR & Coal Co.		SOU	1865	1889	Louisville, Evansville & St. Louis Consolidated RR	
Illinois South Eastern Ry		B&O	1867	1870	Springfield & Illinois South Eastern Ry	
Illinois Southern Ry		MP	1900	1920	Missouri–Illinois RR	
Illinois & Southern Iowa RR		WAB	1857	1865	Toledo, Wabash & Western Ry	
Illinois Terminal Co.		ITC	1922	1937	Illinois Terminal RR	
Illinois Terminal RR	ITC	ITC	1956	1981	Norfolk & Western Ry	
Illinois Terminal RR	ITC	ITC	1937	1954	Illinois–Missouri Terminal Ry	
Illinois Terminal RR		ITC	1895	1922	Illinois Terminal Co.	
Illinois Transfer RR			1899		Terminal RR Association of St. Louis	
Illinois Valley Belt RR			1902			
Illinois Valley & Northern RR		CB&Q	1887	1899	Chicago, Burlington & Quincy RR	
Illinois & Wisconsin RR		CNW	1851	1855	Chicago, St. Paul & Fond du Lac RR	
Indiana, Bloomington & Western Ry		NYC	1879	1887	Pekin & Danville Ry	
Indiana, Decatur & Western Ry		B&O	1895	1902	Cincinnati, Indianapolis & Western Ry	
Indiana Harbor RR		NYC	1907	1907	Indiana Harbor Belt RR	
Indiana Hi-Rail Corp.	IHRC		1986	1997	N/A	
Indiana & Illinois Central Ry		B&O	1855	1875	Springfield, Decatur & Indianapolis Ry	
Indiana, Illinois & Iowa RR		NYC	1881	1906	Chicago, Indiana & Southern RR	
Indiana & Illinois Southern RR		IC	1882	1890	St. Louis, Indianapolis & Eastern RR	
Indiana & Western Ry		NYC	1887	1887	Ohio, Indiana & Western Ry	
Indianapolis, Bloomington & Western Ry		IC/ NYC	1869	1879	Danville & Pekin Ry	
Indianapolis, Crawfordsville & Danville RR		NYC	1868	1869	Indianapolis, Bloomington & Western Ry	
Indianapolis, Decatur & Springfield Ry		B&O	1875	1887	Indianapolis, Quincy & Missouri River Ry	
Indianapolis, Decatur & Western Ry		B&O	1888	1894	Decatur & Eastern Ry	
Indianapolis, Quincy & Missouri River Ry		B&O	1887	1888	Indianapolis, Decatur & Western Ry	
Indianapolis & St. Louis RR		NYC	1869	1882	Indianapolis & St. Louis Ry	
Indianapolis & St. Louis Ry		NYC	1882	1889	Cleveland, Cincinnati, Chicago & St. Louis Ry	
Indianapolis Southern RR		IC	1906	1911	Illinois Central RR	
Iowa RR	IRRC		1981	1984	Iowa Interstate RR	
Iowa Central Ry		MSTL	1888	1912	Minneapolis & St. Louis RR	
Iowa, Chicago & Eastern RR	ICE		2002	2008	Dakota, Minnesota & Eastern RR	
Iron Mountain, Chester & Eastern RR		MP	1873	1878	Wabash, Chester & Western RR	
Jacksonville, Alton & St. Louis RR		GM&O	1857	1862	St. Louis, Jacksonville & Chicago RR	
Jacksonville & Carrollton RR		GM&O	1851	1857	Jacksonville, Alton & St. Louis RR	
Jacksonville & Concord Ry		CB&Q	1903	1904	Jacksonville & St. Louis Ry	
Jacksonville & Havana RR			1925	1938	N/A	
Jacksonville, Louisville & St. Louis Ry		CB&Q	1890	1896	Jacksonville & St. Louis Ry	
Jacksonville, North Western & South Eastern Ry		CB&Q	1867	1879	Jacksonville Southeastern Ry	
Jacksonville & St. Louis Ry		CB&Q	1896	1905	Chicago, Burlington & Quincy RR	
Jacksonville & Savanna RR		CB&Q	1855	1861	Chicago, Burlington & Quincy RR	
Jacksonville Southeastern Ry		CB&Q	1879	1890	Jacksonville, Louisville & St. Louis Ry	
Johnston City Connecting Ry		MP	1911	1913	St. Louis, Iron Mountain & Southern Ry	
Johnston City Southern RR		IC	1914			
Joliet, Aurora & Northern Ry		EJ&E	1884	1888	Elgin, Joliet & Eastern Ry	
Joliet & Blue Island Ry		EJ&E	1889	1938	Elgin, Joliet & Eastern Ry	
Joliet & Chicago RR		GM&O	1855	1950	Gulf, Mobile & Ohio RR	
Joliet Junction RR			1994	1999		
Joliet & Northern Indiana RR		NYC	1854	1976	Conrail	
Joliet, Rockford & Northern RR		CB&Q	1881	1899	Chicago, Burlington & Quincy RR	
Joliet & Terre Haute RR		CB&Q	1852	1859	Illinois Grand Trunk Ry	
Joliet Union Depot Co.		ATSF/ GM&O/ RI	1911			
Junction Ry		CNW	1889	1891	Chicago & North Western Ry	
Kankakee & Illinois River RR		NYC	1869	1870	Plymouth, Kankakee & Pacific RR	
Kankakee & Indiana RR		NYC	1869	1873	Cincinnati, Lafayette & Chicago RR	
Kankakee & Seneca RR		NYC/ RI	1881	1933	N/A	
Kankakee & South Western RR		IC	1880	1902	Illinois Central RR	
Kankakee & South-Western Coal Branch RR		IC	1882	1883	Kankakee & South Western RR	
Kankakee & Southwestern RR		IC	1878	1880	Kankakee & South Western RR	
Kankakee & Western RR		IC	1879	1880	Kankakee & South Western RR	
Kansas & Sidell RR			1919	1938	N/A	
Keithsburg Bridge Co.		MSTL	1885	1901	Iowa Central Ry	
Keithsburg & Eastern RR		MSTL	1873	1880	Peoria & Farmington Ry	
Kenosha & Rockford RR		CNW	1856	1857	Kenosha, Rockford & Rock Island RR	
Kenosha, Rockford & Rock Island RR		CNW	1864	1864	Dixon, Rockford & Kenosha Ry	
Kenosha & State Line RR		CNW	1857	1864	Kenosha, Rockford & Rock Island RR	
Kensington & Eastern RR		IC	1904	1996	Chicago South Shore & South Bend RR	
Keokuk & Hamilton Bridge Co.			1868			
LaFayette, Bloomington & Mississippi RR		NKP	1876	1879	LaFayette, Bloomington & Muncie Ry	
LaFayette, Bloomington & Mississippi Ry		NKP	1867	1876	LaFayette, Bloomington & Mississippi RR	
LaFayette, Bloomington & Muncie Ry		NKP	1879	1879	Lake Erie & Western Ry	
LaFayette, Muncie & Bloomington RR		NKP	1876	1879	Muncie & State Line RR	
LaGrange Connecting RR		NYC				
La Salle & Bureau County RR	LSBC		1890	1985	Chicago Rail Link	
La Salle & Chicago RR		B&O	1867	1873	Chicago & Great Western RR	
Lake Erie & Mississippi Ry		NKP	1884	1885	Lake Erie & Western Ry	
Lake Erie & Western RR		NKP	1887	1923	New York, Chicago & St. Louis RR	
Lake Erie & Western Ry		NKP	1879	1886	Lake Erie & Western RR	
Lake Shore & Michigan Southern Ry		NYC	1869	1914	New York Central RR	
Lee County Ry		CNW	1906	1910	Chicago & North Western Ry	
LeRoy & Eastern RR		IC	1886	1887	Rantoul RR	
Le Roy Narrow Gauge RR		IC	1876	1878	Havana, Rantoul & Eastern RR	
Libertyville Ry		MILW	1878	1881	Chicago, Milwaukee & St. Paul Ry	
Litchfield, Carrollton & Western RR		GM&O	1882	1892	Litchfield, Carrollton & Western Ry	
Litchfield, Carrollton & Western Ry		GM&O	1889	1899	Quincy, Carrollton & St. Louis Ry	
Litchfield & Madison Ry	LM	CNW	1900	1958	Chicago & North Western Ry	
Litchfield & St. Louis Ry		IC	1886	1887	St. Louis & Chicago Ry	
Logansport, Peoria & Burlington RR		TP&W	1861	1864	Toledo, Peoria & Warsaw Ry	
Louisiana & Pike County RR		WAB	1867	1984	N/A	
Louisville, Evansville & St. Louis RR		SOU	1886	1889	Louisville, Evansville & St. Louis Consolidated RR	
Louisville, Evansville & St. Louis Ry		SOU	1882	1886	Louisville, Evansville & St. Louis RR	
Louisville, Evansville & St. Louis Consolidated RR		SOU	1889	1900	Southern Ry of Illinois	
Louisville & Nashville RR	L&N, LN	L&N	1880	1983	Seaboard System RR	
Louisville, New Albany & Chicago Ry		MON	1884	1897	Chicago, Indianapolis & Louisville Ry	
Louisville, New Albany & St. Louis Ry		SOU	1878	1882	Louisville, Evansville & St. Louis Ry	
Louisville, New Albany & St. Louis Air Line Ry		SOU	1872	1877	St. Louis & Mount Carmel Ry	
Louisville & St. Louis Ry		SOU	1886	1897	Louisville, Evansville & St. Louis Consolidated RR	
Lowell & Southern RR		CB&Q	1925		N/A	
Lyons & Chicago RR		B&O	1897			
Macomb, Industry & Littleton Ry			1913	1930	N/A	
Macomb, Vermont & Bath RR		CB&Q	1853	1854	Peoria & Hannibal RR	
Macomb & Western Illinois Ry			1901	1911	Macomb, Industry & Littleton Ry	
Macoupin County Ry		CNW	1903	1912	St. Louis, Peoria & North Western Ry	
Macoupin County Extension Ry		CNW	1913	1920	Chicago & North Western Ry	
Madison County RR		WAB	1865	1871	Wabash Ry	
Madison, Illinois & St. Louis Ry			1891	1941	Madison, Illinois & St. Louis RR	
Madison, Illinois & St. Louis RR			1941	1953	St. Louis Merchants Bridge Terminal Ry	
Marion & Eastern RR		MP	1913	1956	Missouri Pacific RR	
Marion & Harrisburg Ry		MP	1905	1913	St. Louis, Iron Mountain & Southern Ry	
Marion & Johnston City Ry		MP	1905	1913	St. Louis, Iron Mountain & Southern Ry	
Marquette, Spring Valley & Northwestern RR			1901	1907	Illinois Valley Ry (electric)	
Mattoon & Evansville RR		IC	1900	1902	Illinois Central RR	
Mercer County Bridge Co.		MSTL	1881	1885	Keithsburg Bridge Co.	
Michigan Air Line RR			1869	1871	Chicago & Canada Southern Ry	
Michigan Central RR	MC	NYC	1852	1976	Conrail	
The Milwaukee Road, Inc.	MILW	MILW	1985	1986	Soo Line RR	
Milwaukee & Madison Ry		CNW	1880	1881	Chicago, Milwaukee & North Western Ry	
Michigan Southern & Northern Indiana RR		NYC	1855	1869	Lake Shore & Michigan Southern Ry	
Milwaukee & State Line Ry		CNW	1905	1909	Chicago & North Western Ry	
Minneapolis & St. Louis RR		MSTL	1912	1943	Minneapolis & St. Louis Ry	
Minneapolis & St. Louis Ry	MSTL	MSTL	1939	1960	Chicago & North Western Ry	
Minneapolis, St. Paul & Sault Ste. Marie RR	SOO	CP	1944	1961	Soo Line RR	
Minneapolis, St. Paul & Sault Ste. Marie Ry	SOO	CP	1909	1944	Minneapolis, St. Paul & Sault Ste. Marie RR	
Minnesota & Northwestern RR		CGW	1886	1894	Chicago Great Western Ry	
Mississippi RR		MILW	1865	1865	Northern Illinois RR	
Mississippi River Bridge Co.		GM&O	1873	1895	Chicago & Alton RR	
Mississippi River RR & Toll Bridge Co.		ATSF	1886	1900	Atchison, Topeka & Santa Fe Ry	
Mississippi & Rock River Junction RR		CNW	1851	1855	Galena & Chicago Union RR	
Mississippi & Wabash RR		TP&W	1853	1865	Toledo, Peoria & Warsaw Ry	
Missouri–Illinois RR	MI	MP	1921	1978	Missouri Pacific RR	
Missouri & Illinois Bridge & Belt RR Co.		CB&Q	1904	1966	Chicago, Burlington & Quincy RR	
Missouri Pacific RR	MP	MP	1918	1997	Union Pacific RR	
Missouri Pacific RR in Illinois		MP	1917	1918	Missouri Pacific RR	
Missouri Pacific Ry			1881	1890	Terminal RR Association of St. Louis	
Mobile & Ohio RR		GM&O	1886	1940	Gulf, Mobile & Ohio RR	
Moline & Peoria Ry		CB&Q/ MILW	1900	1901	Davenport, Rock Island & North Western Ry	
Moline & Southeastern Narrow Gauge Ry			1878	1885	N/A	
Momence & State Line RR		C&EI	1887	1888	Chicago & Eastern Illinois RR	
Monon RR	MON	MON	1956	1971	Louisville & Nashville RR	
Morris Terminal Ry		RI	1905	1948	Chicago, Rock Island & Pacific RR	
Mound City RR		IC	1855	1885	Mound City Ry	
Mound City Ry		IC	1882	1902	Illinois Central RR	
Mounds & Olive Branch RR		IC	1902	1903	Illinois Central RR	
Mount Carbon Coal RR		IC	1861	1869	Grand Tower Mining, Manufacturing & Transportation Co.	
Mount Carmel & Alton RR		WAB	1836	1865	Madison County RR	
Mount Olive Coal RR		IC	1888	1888	St. Louis & Chicago RR	
Mount Vernon RR		L&N	1855	1869	St. Louis & Southeastern Ry	
Muncie & State Line RR		NKP	1879	1879	LaFayette, Bloomington & Muncie Ry	
Murphysboro & Shawneetown RR		IC	1867	1869	Carbondale & Shawneetown RR	
Nauvoo & Warsaw RR		MILW	1847	1849	Warsaw & Rockford RR	
New Castle & Danville RR		NYC	1854	1869	Indianapolis, Crawfordsville & Danville RR	
New York Central RR	NYC	NYC	1914	1968	Penn Central Transportation Co.	
New York & Chicago Ry		NKP	1881	1881	New York, Chicago & St. Louis Ry	
New York, Chicago & St. Louis RR	NKP	NKP	1887	1964	Norfolk & Western Ry	
New York, Chicago & St. Louis Ry		NKP	1881	1887	Chicago & State Line RR	
Norfolk & Western Ry	N&W, NW		1964	1998	Norfolk Southern Ry	
North & South RR of Illinois		IC	1890	1896	St. Louis, Peoria & Northern Ry	
North Western Grand Trunk Ry		CN	1879	1880	Chicago & Grand Trunk Ry	
Northern Cross RR		CB&Q	1849	1857	Quincy & Chicago RR	
Northern Cross RR & Transportation Co.		WAB	1843	1847	Sangamon & Morgan RR	
Northern Illinois RR		MILW	1859	1866	Western Union RR	
Northern Illinois Ry		CNW	1884	1888	Chicago & North Western Ry	
Northern Indiana RR		NYC	1855	1855	Michigan Southern & Northern Indiana RR	
Northern Indiana & Chicago RR		NYC	1850	1855	Northern Indiana RR	
Northern Pacific RR		NP	1890	1893	N/A	leased the Wisconsin Central Co.
Northern & Southern Illinois RR		CB&Q	1904	1908	Chicago, Burlington & Quincy RR	
Ogle & Carroll County RR		CB&Q	1857	1871	Chicago & Iowa RR	
Oglesby & Granville Ry		MILW	1905	1913	Chicago, Milwaukee & St. Paul Ry	
Ohio, Indiana & Western Ry		NYC	1887	1890	Peoria & Eastern Ry	
Ohio & Mississippi RR		B&O	1851	1862	Ohio & Mississippi Ry	
Ohio & Mississippi Ry		B&O	1861	1893	Baltimore & Ohio Southwestern Ry	
Orion & Minersville RR		CB&Q	1872	1875	St. Louis, Rock Island & Chicago RR	
Ottawa, Oswego & Fox River Valley RR		CB&Q	1852	1899	Chicago, Burlington & Quincy RR	
Paducah & Illinois RR	PI	CB&Q/ IC/ L&N	1910			still exists as a joint subsidiary of BNSF, CN and CSX
Palatine, Lake Zurich & Wauconda RR			1918	1921	Chicago, Palatine & Wauconda RR	
Pana, Springfield & North Western RR		B&O	1865	1870	Springfield & Illinois South Eastern Ry	
Paris & Danville RR		NYC	1869	1881	Danville & Southwestern RR	
Paris & Decatur RR		PRR	1861	1874	Peoria, Atlanta & Decatur RR	
Paris & Terre Haute RR		PRR	1873	1874	Peoria, Atlanta & Decatur RR	
Pawnee RR			1888	1905	Central Illinois Ry	
Peabody Short Line RR		IC	1958	1961	Illinois Central RR	
Pekin & Danville Ry		NYC	1887	1887	Indiana & Western Ry	
Pekin, Lincoln & Decatur RR		IC	1861	1876	Pekin, Lincoln & Decatur Ry	
Pekin, Lincoln & Decatur Ry		IC	1876	1879	Peoria, Decatur & Evansville Ry	
Peninsular Ry		CN	1869	1870	Peninsular Ry	
Peninsular Ry		CN	1870	1873	Chicago & Lake Huron RR	
Penn Central Transportation Co.	PC		1968	1976	Conrail	
Penndel Co.		PRR	1954	1976	Conrail	
Pennsylvania Co.		PRR	1871	1918	Pennsylvania RR	
Pennsylvania RR	PRR	PRR	1918	1968	Penn Central Transportation Co.	
Peoria, Atlanta & Decatur RR		PRR	1869	1874	Illinois Midland Ry	
Peoria & Bureau Valley RR		RI	1853	1980	Baltimore & Ohio RR	
Peoria & Burlington RR		CB&Q	1863	1864	Chicago, Burlington & Quincy RR	
Peoria, Decatur & Evansville Ry		B&O/ IC	1879	1900	Peoria, Decatur & Mattoon RR	
Peoria, Decatur & Mattoon RR		IC	1900	1905	Illinois Central RR	
Peoria & Eastern Ry	PAE, PE	NYC	1890	1976	Conrail	
Peoria & Farmington Ry		MSTL	1869	1882	Central Iowa Ry	
Peoria, Hanna City & Western Ry		RI	1918	1951	N/A	
Peoria & Hannibal RR		CB&Q	1854	1868	Peoria, Pekin & Jacksonville RR	
Peoria & North-Western Ry		CNW	1900	1901	Chicago & North Western Ry	
Peoria & Oquawka RR		TP&W	1849	1861	Logansport, Peoria & Burlington RR	
Peoria, Pekin & Jacksonville RR			1863	1881	Wabash, St. Louis & Pacific Ry	
Peoria & Pekin Terminal Ry		RI	1899	1907	Peoria Ry Terminal Co.	
Peoria & Pekin Traction Co.		RI	1897	1899	Peoria & Pekin Terminal Ry	
Peoria Ry Terminal Co.		RI	1906	1926	Peoria Terminal Co.	
Peoria & Rock Island Ry		RI	1867	1877	Rock Island & Peoria Ry	
Peoria & Springfield RR		CNW/ IC/ NKP/ NYC/ PRR	1859	1882	Peoria & Pekin Union Ry	
Peoria Terminal Co.	PT, PTC	RI	1926	1980	|align=left|	
Peoria Terminal Ry		RI	1885	1903	Rock Island & Peoria Ry	
Pere Marquette RR		PM	1903	1917	Pere Marquette Ry	
Pere Marquette Ry	PM	PM	1917	1947	Chesapeake & Ohio Ry	
Peru, La Salle & Deer Park RR			1905	1934	N/A	
Petersburg & Springfield RR		GM&O	1853	1854	Sangamon & North West RR	
Philadelphia, Baltimore & Washington RR		PRR	1956	1976	Conrail	
Pike County Bridge Co.		WAB	1867	1869	Hannibal Bridge Co.	
Pike County RR		WAB	1857	1865	Hannibal & Naples RR	
Pittsburgh RR & Coal Co.		SOU	1859	1865	Illinois & St. Louis RR & Coal Co.	
Pittsburgh, Cincinnati, Chicago & St. Louis RR		PRR	1917	1956	Philadelphia, Baltimore & Washington RR	
Pittsburgh, Cincinnati, Chicago & St. Louis Ry		PRR	1890	1917	Pittsburgh, Cincinnati, Chicago & St. Louis RR	
Pittsburgh, Fort Wayne & Chicago RR		PRR	1856	1861	Pittsburgh, Fort Wayne & Chicago Ry	
Pittsburgh, Fort Wayne & Chicago Ry		PRR	1861	1976	Conrail	
Plymouth, Kankakee & Pacific RR		NYC	1870	1881	Indiana, Illinois & Iowa RR	
Polk & Forty-ninth Streets Junction Ry		CN	1889	1889	Grand Trunk Junction Ry	
Prairie Central Ry	PACY		1981		N/A	
Prairie Trunk Ry	PARY		1977	1984	N/A	
Preemption Eastern RR		RI	1893	1903	Rock Island & Peoria Ry	
Pullman RR	PLM	RI	1906	1980	Norfolk & Western Ry	
Quincy, Alton & St. Louis Ry		CB&Q	1867	1899	Chicago, Burlington & Quincy RR	
Quincy, Carrollton & St. Louis Ry		GM&O	1899	1904	Chicago & Alton RR	
Quincy & Chicago RR		CB&Q	1857	1864	Chicago, Burlington & Quincy RR	
Quincy, Missouri & Pacific RR		CB&Q	1869	1886	Quincy, Omaha & Kansas City Ry	
Quincy, Omaha & Kansas City RR		CB&Q	1897	1939	Chicago, Burlington & Quincy RR	
Quincy, Omaha & Kansas City Ry		CB&Q	1887	1897	Quincy, Omaha & Kansas City RR	
Quincy RR Bridge Co.		CB&Q	1867	1903	Chicago, Burlington & Quincy RR	
Quincy & Toledo RR		WAB	1857	1865	Toledo, Wabash & Western Ry	
Quincy & Warsaw RR		CB&Q	1865	1899	Chicago, Burlington & Quincy RR	
Racine & Mississippi RR		MILW	1855	1868	Western Union RR	
RR Bridge Co.		CB&Q	1853	1867	Quincy RR Bridge Co.	
Randolph County RR		MP	1894	1895	Centralia & Chester RR	
Rantoul RR		IC	1887	1903	Illinois Central RR	
Riverside & Harlem RR		IC	1901	1902	Illinois Central RR	
Rochelle & Southern Ry		MILW	1902	1913	Chicago, Milwaukee & St. Paul Ry	
Rock Island & Alton RR		CB&Q	1855	1859	St. Louis, Alton & Rock Island RR	
Rock Island & Eastern Illinois Ry		CB&Q/ MILW	1896	1900	Davenport, Rock Island & Northwestern Ry	
Rock Island & La Salle RR		RI	1847	1851	Chicago & Rock Island RR	
Rock Island & Mercer County RR		RI	1876	1903	Rock Island & Peoria Ry	
Rock Island & Peoria RR		RI	1855	1869	Peoria & Rock Island Ry	
Rock Island & Peoria Ry		RI	1877	1908	Chicago, Rock Island & Pacific Ry	
Rockdale, Joliet & Lockport Terminal Ry		EJ&E		1905	Elgin, Joliet & Eastern Ry	
Rockford RR		IC	1906	1906	Illinois Central RR	
Rockford Belt Ry		MILW	1905	1908	Chicago, Milwaukee & Gary Ry	
Rockford Central RR		MILW	1869	1873	Chicago & Superior RR	
Rockford Central RR		CNW	1855	1856	Kenosha & Rockford RR	
Rockford & Mississippi RR		CNW	1857	1857	Kenosha & State Line RR	
Rockford, Rock Island & St. Louis RR		CB&Q	1876	1899	St. Louis, Rock Island & Chicago RR	
Rockton & Freeport RR		MILW	1853	1855	Racine & Mississippi RR	
Rossville & Eastern RR		C&EI	1902	1903	Chicago & Eastern Illinois RR	
Rossville & Indiana RR		C&EI	1872	1872	Chicago, Danville & Vincennes RR	
Rutland, Toluca & Northern RR		GM&O	1909	1938	N/A	
St. Charles RR		CNW	1859	1881	Elgin & State Line RR	
St. Charles Branch Railroad		CNW	1849	1853	Chicago, St. Charles & Mississippi Air Line RR	
St. Clair RR		SOU	1841	1853	St. Clair RR & Coal Co.	
St. Clair RR & Coal Co.		SOU	1853	1857	Pittsburgh RR & Coal Co.	
St. Clair Coal Ry		PRR	1904	1908	Vandalia RR	
St. Clair, Madison & St. Louis Belt RR		CB&Q	1890	1904	Missouri & Illinois Bridge & Belt RR Co.	
St. Francisville & Lawrenceville RR		NYC	1879	1881	Wabash, St. Louis & Pacific Ry	
St. Louis, Alton & Chicago RR		GM&O	1857	1862	Chicago & Alton RR	
St. Louis, Alton & Rock Island RR		CB&Q	1859	1868	Rockford, Rock Island & St. Louis RR	
St. Louis, Alton & Springfield RR			1887	1892	St. Louis, Chicago & St. Paul RR	
St. Louis, Alton & Terre Haute RR		IC/ NYC	1862	1904	Illinois Central RR	
St. Louis & Belleville Electric Ry		IC	1897	1958	Peabody Short Line RR	electric traction until 1949
St. Louis, Belleville & Southern Ry		IC	1895	1946	Illinois Central RR	
St. Louis Bridge Co.			1878		Terminal RR Association of St. Louis	
St. Louis & Cairo RR		GM&O	1881	1913	Mobile & Ohio RR	
St. Louis Central Ry		IC	1881	1886	St. Louis Southern RR	
St. Louis & Central Illinois RR			1886	1888	St. Louis, Alton & Springfield RR	
St. Louis & Chicago RR		IC	1888	1889	St. Louis & Chicago Ry	
St. Louis & Chicago Ry		IC	1885	1889	North & South RR of Illinois	
St. Louis, Chicago & Peoria Ry		IC	1886	1886	St. Louis & Chicago Ry	
St. Louis, Chicago & St. Paul RR			1892	1897	St. Louis, Chicago & St. Paul Ry of Illinois	
St. Louis, Chicago & St. Paul Ry of Illinois			1897	1900	Chicago, Peoria & St. Louis Ry of Illinois	
St. Louis Coal RR		IC	1881	1886	St. Louis Southern RR	
St. Louis Connecting RR		PRR	1925	1931	Pittsburgh, Cincinnati, Chicago & St. Louis RR	
St. Louis & Eastern Ry		IC	1889	1896	St. Louis, Peoria & Northern Ry	
St. Louis & Illinois Belt Ry		ITC	1905	1937	Illinois Terminal RR	
St. Louis & Illinois Bridge Co.			1865	1868	Illinois & St. Louis Bridge Co.	
St. Louis, Indianapolis & Eastern RR		IC	1889	1899	Illinois & Eastern RR	
St. Louis, Iron Mountain & Southern Ry		MP	1901	1917	Missouri Pacific RR in Illinois	
St. Louis, Jacksonville & Chicago RR		GM&O	1862	1899	Chicago & Alton RR	
St. Louis, Jerseyville & Springfield RR			1880	1888	St. Louis, Alton & Springfield RR	
St. Louis Merchants Bridge Co.			1886	1920	St. Louis Merchants Bridge Terminal Ry	
St. Louis Merchants Bridge Terminal Ry	SLMB		1887		Terminal RR Association of St. Louis	
St. Louis & Mount Carmel Ry		SOU	1878	1878	Louisville, New Albany & St. Louis Ry	
St. Louis, Mount Carmel & New Albany RR		SOU	1869	1872	Louisville, New Albany & St. Louis Air Line Ry	
St. Louis & O'Fallon Ry	SLOF	C&EI	1896	1954	Chicago & Eastern Illinois RR	
St. Louis & Ohio River RR		MP/ SSW	1920	1948	Alton & Southern RR	
St. Louis & Ohio River RR		IC	1901	1903	Illinois Central RR	
St. Louis & Peoria RR		IC	1889	1896	St. Louis, Peoria & Northern Ry	
St. Louis, Peoria & North Western Ry		CNW	1911	1913	Chicago & North Western Ry	
St. Louis, Peoria & Northern Ry		GM&O/ IC	1898	1900	Illinois Central RR	
St. Louis, Rock Island & Chicago RR		CB&Q	1876	1899	Chicago, Burlington & Quincy RR	
St. Louis & South Eastern Ry		L&N	1872	1879	South East & St. Louis Ry	
St. Louis & Southeastern RR		L&N	1871	1871	St. Louis & Southeastern Ry	
St. Louis & Southeastern Ry		L&N	1871	1872	St. Louis & South Eastern Ry	
St. Louis & Southeastern Ry		L&N	1869	1871	St. Louis & Southeastern RR	
St. Louis Southern RR		IC	1886	1897	St. Louis, Alton & Terre Haute RR	
St. Louis & Southern Illinois RR		MP	1901	1902	Illinois Southern Ry	
St. Louis Southwestern Ry	SSW	SSW	1905	1997	Union Pacific RR	
St. Louis, Springfield & Vincennes Ry		B&O	1899	1899	Cincinnati, Louisville & Vincennes Ry	
St. Louis, Troy & Eastern RR		ITC	1899	1937	Illinois Terminal RR	
St. Louis Valley Ry		MP	1901	1903	St. Louis, Iron Mountain & Southern Ry	
St. Louis Valley Transfer Ry		MP	1902	1903	St. Louis Valley Ry	
St. Louis, Vandalia & Terre Haute RR		PRR	1865	1905	Vandalia RR	
Saline Valley Ry		NYC	1907	1917	Cleveland, Cincinnati, Chicago & St. Louis Ry	
Sangamon & Morgan RR		WAB	1845	1853	Great Western RR	
Sangamon & North West RR		GM&O	1854	1859	Alton & St. Louis RR	
Savanna Branch RR		MILW	1851	1856	Racine & Mississippi RR	
Seaboard System RR	SBD		1983	1986	CSX Transportation	
SF&L Ry	SFAL		2001	2002	Toledo, Peoria & Western Ry	
Shawneetown & Eldorado RR		L&N	1861	1869	St. Louis & Southeastern Ry	
Sidell & Olney RR			1915	1919	Yale Short Line RR	
South Chicago RR		IC	1881	1987	Northeast Illinois Regional Commuter RR Corp.	
South Chicago & Southern RR		PRR	1881	1954	Penndel Co.	
South Chicago & Western Indiana RR		C&EI/ CN/ ERIE/ MON/ WAB	1880	1882	Chicago & Western Indiana RR	
South East & St. Louis Ry		L&N	1880	1936	Louisville & Nashville RR	
South Wilmington & Southern RR			1907	1918	Chicago, Wilmington & Franklin Coal Co.	
Southern Ry	SOU	SOU	1900	1990	Norfolk Southern Ry	
Southern Ry of Illinois		SOU	1900	1900	Southern Ry	
Southern Illinois & Kentucky RR		IC	1925	1954	Illinois Central RR	
Southern Indiana Ry		MILW	1908	1910	Chicago, Terre Haute & Southeastern Ry	
Sparta & Ste. Genevieve RR		MP	1889	1894	Centralia & Chester RR	
SPCSL Corp.	SSWN	SSW	1989	1997	Union Pacific RR	
Springfield & Decatur Ry		B&O	1901	1901	Indiana, Decatur & Western Ry	
Springfield, Decatur & Indianapolis Ry		B&O	1875	1875	Indianapolis, Decatur & Springfield Ry	
Springfield, Effingham & South Eastern RR		IC	1869	1883	Indiana & Illinois Southern RR	
Springfield, Havana & Peoria RR			1926	1936	Chicago & Illinois Midland Ry	
Springfield & Illinois South Eastern Ry		B&O	1870	1874	Ohio & Mississippi Ry	
Springfield & Northwestern RR			1869	1878	Springfield & Northwestern Ry	
Springfield & Northwestern Ry			1878	1881	Wabash, St. Louis & Pacific Ry	
Springfield & Pekin RR		CNW/ IC/ NKP/ NYC/ PRR	1853	1859	Peoria & Springfield RR	
Springfield & Southwestern RR			1942	1945	N/A	
Springfield Terminal Ry	SFT		1908	1952	N/A	
Strawn & Indiana State Line RR		C&EI	1880	1887	Chicago & Eastern Illinois RR	
Streator & Clinton RR		NYC	1899	1900	Indiana, Illinois & Iowa RR	
Sycamore & Cortland RR		CNW	1859	1888	Chicago & North Western Ry	
Tamaroa & Mount Vernon Ry		MP	1891	1892	Wabash, Chester & Western RR	
Terminal Railroad		NYC	1896	1907	Indiana Harbor RR	
Terminal RR of East St. Louis			1880		Terminal RR Association of St. Louis	
Terre Haute & Alton RR		NYC	1851	1856	Terre Haute, Alton & St. Louis RR	
Terre Haute, Alton & St. Louis RR		NYC	1856	1862	St. Louis, Alton & Terre Haute RR	
Terre Haute & Indianapolis RR		PRR	1892	1905	Vandalia RR	
Terre Haute & Peoria RR		PRR	1887	1957	Penndel Co.	
Thayer Junction Ry			1909	1918	Chicago, Wilmington & Franklin Coal Co.	
Toledo, Charleston & St. Louis RR		NKP	1886	1886	Toledo, St. Louis & Kansas City RR	
Toledo, Cincinnati & St. Louis RR		NKP	1881	1884	Toledo, Charleston & St. Louis RR	
Toledo & East St. Louis RR		NKP	1900	1900	Toledo, St. Louis & Western RR	
Toledo, Peoria & Warsaw Ry		TP&W	1864	1880	Toledo, Peoria & Western RR	
Toledo, Peoria & Western RR	TP&W, TPW	TP&W	1927	1983	Atchison, Topeka & Santa Fe Ry	
Toledo, Peoria & Western RR		TP&W	1879	1886	Toledo, Peoria & Western Ry	
Toledo, Peoria & Western Ry	TP&W	TP&W	1887	1927	Toledo, Peoria & Western RR	
Toledo, St. Louis & Kansas City RR		NKP	1886	1900	Toledo & East St. Louis RR	
Toledo, St. Louis & Western RR		NKP	1900	1923	New York, Chicago & St. Louis RR	
Toledo, Wabash & Western Ry		WAB	1865	1876	Wabash Ry	
Toluca & Eastern RR		GM&O	1897	1902	Toluca, Marquette & Northern RR	
Toluca, Marquette & Northern RR		GM&O	1900	1909	Rutland, Toluca & Northern RR	
Tonica & Petersburg RR		GM&O	1857	1862	St. Louis, Jacksonville & Chicago RR	
Tuscola, Charleston & Vincennes RR		NKP	1867	1881	Toledo, Cincinnati & St. Louis RR	
Union Railroad		NYC	1852	1881	Michigan Central RR	
Union Ry & Transit Co.			1874	1880	Terminal RR of East St. Louis	
Union Station Co.		CB&Q/ MILW/ PRR	1913	1915	Chicago Union Station Co.	
Union Stock Yard & Transit Co. of Chicago		NYC	1865	1958	Chicago River & Indiana RR	
Vandalia RR		PRR	1905	1917	Pittsburgh, Cincinnati, Chicago & St. Louis RR	
Venice & Carondelet Ry		SOU	1880	1889	Louisville, Evansville & St. Louis Consolidated RR	
Vermilion & State Line RR		NKP	1881	1881	Toledo, Cincinnati & St. Louis RR	
Wabash RR	WAB	WAB	1942	1991	Norfolk & Western Ry	
Wabash RR		WAB	1889	1915	Wabash Ry	
Wabash Ry		WAB	1915	1942	Wabash RR	
Wabash Ry		WAB	1876	1879	Wabash, St. Louis & Pacific Ry	
Wabash, Chester & Western RR		MP	1878	1928	Chester & Mount Vernon RR	
Wabash Eastern Ry of Illinois		WAB	1889	1889	Wabash RR	
Wabash – Hannibal Bridge Co.		WAB	1937	1943	Wabash RR	
Wabash, St. Louis & Pacific Ry		WAB	1879	1886	Wabash Eastern Ry of Illinois	
Wabash Southern Ry		MP	1905	1909	St. Louis, Iron Mountain & Southern Ry	
Wabash Valley RR	WVRC		1977	1981	Prairie Central Ry	
Wabash Western Ry		WAB	1887	1889	Wabash RR	
Warsaw, Rock Island & Galena RR		MILW	1863	1872	Western Union RR	
Warsaw & Rockford RR		MILW	1849	1863	Warsaw, Rock Island & Galena RR	
Watertown RR		MILW	1874	1876	Western Union RR	
Waukegan & Mississippi Valley Ry			1893	1919	American Steel & Wire Co.	
Waukegan, Rockford & Elgin Traction Co.			1909	1918	Palatine, Lake Zurich & Wauconda RR	operated by steam locomotives
Waukegan & Southwestern Ry		EJ&E		1891	Elgin, Joliet & Eastern Ry	
Western Air Line RR		CB&Q	1853	1859	American Central Ry	
Western Union RR		MILW	1863	1900	Chicago, Milwaukee & St. Paul Ry	
Westfield RR	WSD		1919	1926	Casey & Kansas RR	
Wisconsin & Calumet RR	WICT		1985	1997	Wisconsin & Southern RR	
Wisconsin Central Co.		CP	1887	1899	Wisconsin Central Ry	
Wisconsin Central RR		CP	1954	1961	Soo Line RR	
Wisconsin Central Ry		CP	1897	1954	Wisconsin Central RR	
Wisconsin & Minnesota RR		CP	1885	1888	Wisconsin Central Co.	
Yale Short Line RR			1919	1933	N/A	

=== Electric railways ===
Company	Mark
Aurora, Elgin and Chicago Railroad	
Aurora, Elgin and Fox River Electric Company	
Alton, Jacksonville and Peoria Railway	
Bloomington, Pontiac and Joliet Electric Railway	
Cairo and St. Louis Railway	
Calumet and South Chicago Railway	
Central Illinois Public Service Company	
Centralia and Central City Traction Company	
Chicago, Aurora and DeKalb Railroad	
Chicago Aurora and Elgin Railroad	
Chicago City Railway	
Chicago and Desplaines Valley Electric Railway	
Chicago General Railway	
Chicago, Harvard and Geneva Lake Railway	CH&G
Chicago and Joliet Electric Railway	
Chicago, Lake Shore and South Bend Railway	
Chicago and Milwaukee Electric Railroad	
Chicago North Shore and Milwaukee Railroad	
Chicago, Ottawa and Peoria Railway	CO&P
Chicago South Shore and South Bend Railroad	
Chicago and South Side Rapid Transit Railroad	
Chicago and Southern Traction Company	
Chicago Surface Lines	
Chicago Tunnel Company	
Chicago, Wheaton and Western Railway	
Coal Belt Electric Railway	
DeKalb – Sycamore and Interurban Traction Company	
East St. Louis and Suburban Railway	
Elgin, Aurora and Southern Traction Company	
Elgin and Belvidere Electric Company	
Fruit Growers Refrigerating and Power Company	
Galesburg Railway and Light Company	
Galesburg and Kewanee Electric Railway	
Illinois Central Electric Railway	
Illinois Traction, Inc.	ITS
Illinois Valley Railway	
Illinois Valley Traction Company	
Joliet and Southern Traction Company	
Kankakee and Western Electric Railway	
Keokuk and Western Illinois Electric Company	
Lake Street Elevated Railroad	
Lee County Central Electric Railway	
Macomb and Western Illinois Railway	
Metropolitan West Side Elevated Railroad	
Mississippi Valley Interurban Railway	
Moline, East Moline and Watertown Railway	
North Kankakee Electric Light and Railway Company	
Northern Illinois Electric Railway	
Northwestern Elevated Railroad	
Peoples Traction Company	
Peoria Railway	
Peoria and Pekin Terminal Railway	
Peoria and Pekin Traction Company	
Peoria Railway Terminal Company	
Rock Island Southern Railway	RIS
Rockford, Beloit and Janesville Railroad	
Rockford and Belvidere Electric Railway	
Rockford and Interurban Railway	
St. Louis and Belleville Electric Railway	
South Side Elevated Railroad	
Southern Traction Company of Illinois	
Springfield, Clear Lake and Rochester Railway	
Sterling, Dixon and Eastern Electric Railway	
Suburban Railroad	
Terre Haute, Indianapolis and Eastern Traction Company	
Tri-City Railway	
Union Consolidated Elevated Railway	
Woodstock and Sycamore Traction Company	
