= Calumet River Railway (Illinois) =

Overview
- Dates of operation: March 5, 1883–February 5, 1901
- Successor: South Chicago and Southern Railroad

Technical
- Track gauge: 4 ft 8 1/2 in (1,435 mm)
- Length: 4 mi (6.4 km)

The Calumet River Railway built a 4-mile (6.4 km) rail line in Chicago, serving industries on the east side of the Calumet River. The company was incorporated on March 5, 1883, and completed the line on September 16, 1895. From opening, it was operated by the Pennsylvania Company, which also operated the lines to which it connected - the Pittsburgh, Fort Wayne and Chicago Railway near 100th Street in South Chicago and the South Chicago and Southern Railroad near 132nd Street in Hegewisch. On February 5, 1901, the Calumet River Railway was merged into the South Chicago and Southern Railroad. The lease was transferred from the Pennsylvania Company to parent Pennsylvania Railroad on January 1, 1918, and to the Penn Central Transportation Company in 1968. In 1954 the South Chicago and Southern Railroad was merged into the Penndel Company, and in 1976 ownership and operation of the line was acquired by the Consolidated Rail Corporation (Conrail).

In 1999, with the split on Conrail, the line was transferred to the Norfolk Southern Railway, which calls it the Calumet River Industrial Track. The South Chicago and Indiana Harbor Railway has trackage rights over the north half of the line, which predecessor Chicago Short Line Railway acquired to reach the old Republic Steel coke works near 110th Street.

== See also ==
- List of defunct Illinois railroads
