= Lost Bridge Trail =

Rail trail in Sangamon County, Illinois, USA

The Lost Bridge Trail is a 5.0-mile (8.0 km) rail trail in Sangamon County, Illinois. It was built by the Illinois Department of Transportation (IDOT) along an abandoned Baltimore and Ohio Railroad corridor between the east side of Springfield, Illinois to the center of Rochester, Illinois. The west end of the trail is on the southeast side of Springfield, off the South Dirksen Parkway (39°46′30.0″N 89°36′17.6″W). The east end of the trail is in Rochester, at the Community Drive interchange of illinois Route 29 (39°44′37.0″N 89°31′36.7″W). Population in the trail's Rochester service area is growing rapidly. Springfield is the county's employment center, and the Lost Bridge Trail is available for use by bicycle commuters who live in Sangamon County's southeast townships. The trail is managed jointly by the Illinois Department of Transportation and the village of Rochester.

The trail crosses the South Fork of the Sangamon River near Rochester, and crosses Sugar Creek near Springfield. Sugar Creek carries the outflow from Lake Springfield, a sizable nearby reservoir. The Lost Bridge trail name recalls IDOT's failure to prevent salvagers affiliated with the B&O from dismantling the Sugar Creek bridge for scrap. IDOT had to build a new bridge.

The B&O right-of-way used for this trail was originally completed in 1871 as the Springfield and Illinois South Eastern Railway, which extended west to Beardstown and southeast to Shawneetown. Most or all of this right-of-way has reverted to the private sector, with sections converted to rails-to-trails use. The S&ISE/B&O right-of-way is also used for a continuing trail, the Lincoln Prairie Trail, which connects Taylorville with Pana along the same railroad bed.

The trail has also been extended further into the Springfield city limits via the Bunn to Lost Bridge Trail, which follows small stretches of Ash Street and Taylor Avenue in Springfield. Future plans are calling for this section of trail to extend further still and meet dedicated bike lanes along Stanford Avenue.
