= Grand Trunk Junction Railway =

Map

The Grand Trunk Junction Railway was a subsidiary of the Grand Trunk Railway that built a connecting line along 49th Street in Chicago, Illinois. The company was incorporated on June 11, 1880, and opened on August 29, 1881 under lease to the Chicago and Grand Trunk Railway. Its line was double-tracked and began at the Chicago and Grand Trunk's main line at Elsdon, heading east across the Columbus, Chicago and Indiana Central Railway and just south of the Union Stock Yards to a junction with the Chicago and Western Indiana Railroad, a terminal railroad that gave the Chicago and Grand Trunk access to downtown Chicago, and which the Grand Trunk Junction acquired a one-fifth interest in. The Polk and Forty-ninth Streets Junction Railway, which did not construct any railroad, was incorporated on March 27 and merged into the Grand Trunk Junction on June 21, 1889. On January 15, 1901, just after the Chicago and Grand Trunk was reorganized as the Grand Trunk Western Railway, the latter company bought the property of the Grand Trunk Junction.

The western half of the line is still owned and operated by the Grand Trunk Western Railroad as part of its Elsdon Subdivision, which continues south from Elsdon along the Port Huron-bound main line, and north from a junction at Oakley Avenue to the Railport Yard at 43rd Street. The latter line is just east of the Norfolk Southern Railway's ex-Chicago River and Indiana Railroad line. East of Oakley Avenue, the old Grand Trunk Junction has been removed from service and disconnected at both ends.

== See also ==
- List of defunct Illinois railroads
