= St. Louis and Cairo Railroad =

- System map with the 1873 line in red,the 1875 line in blue, and the Millstadt branch in gray. Courtesy OpenHistoricalMap

Overview
- Dates of operation: 1865–1886
- Successor: Mobile and Ohio Railroad

The St. Louis and Cairo Railroad, formerly the Cairo and St. Louis Railroad, was a rail line between East St. Louis, Illinois and Cairo, Illinois.

== History ==
The Cairo and St. Louis Railroad was chartered on February 16, 1865, with the goal of connecting the coal mines around Murphysboro, Illinois to the industries in St. Louis, with the wider goal of connecting St. Louis with Cairo, Illinois.

Construction on the track began September 1, 1871, and the track opened between Murphysboro and East St. Louis on July 1, 1873. Work started to extend the track to Cairo October 14, 1874, and was competed February 19, 1875.

The railroad faced financial troubles after a tunnel at Kaolin collapsed in 1877, entering receivership in 1877. In 1881, it was reorganized as the St. Louis and Cairo Railroad, the tunnel was repaired, and a profitable coal service began.

In 1883, a branch line was built from Millstadt Junction to Millstadt, Illinois in 1883. Service began November 13, 1883.

In 1886, the line was sold to the Mobile and Ohio Railroad, who widened the road to Standard-gauge on November 15, 1886.

== See also ==
- List of defunct Illinois railroads
