= Northern Cross Railroad =

Overview
- Headquarters: Meredosia, Illinois
- Locale: central United States
- Dates of operation: 1838–1847
- Successor: Wabash Railroad

Technical
- Track gauge: 4 ft 8 1/2 in (1,435 mm) standard gauge

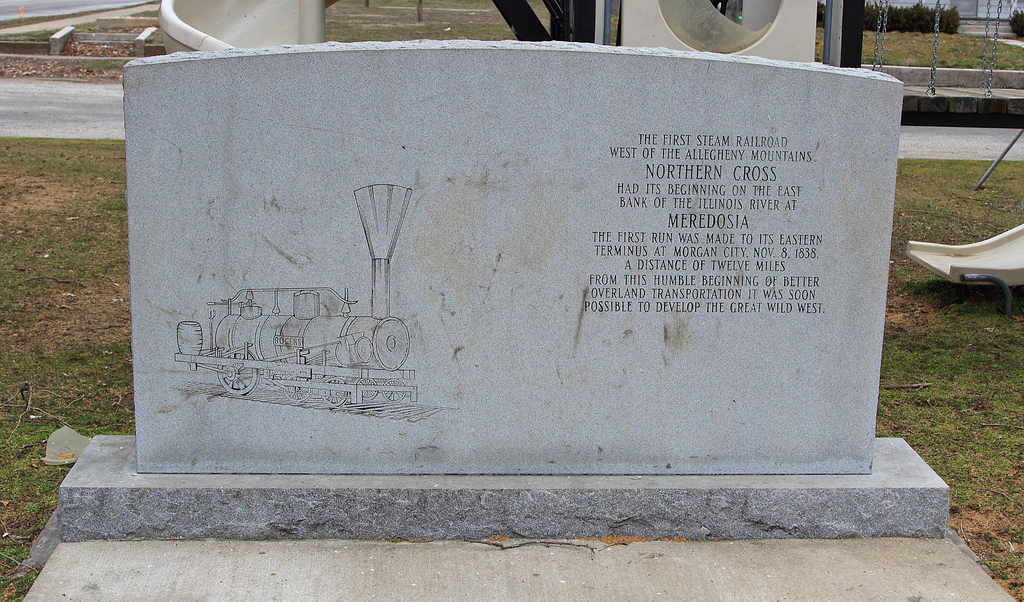
Northern Cross Railroad monument in Meredosia.

The Northern Cross Railroad was the first railroad to operate in Illinois, originating in Meredosia and eventually extending both east and west to the state borders. It eventually linked the state capital Springfield east to Decatur and Danville, and west to Jacksonville and the Illinois River, and later to Quincy on the Mississippi River.

== First railroad in the nation's rail-center state ==
On November 8, 1838, the first railroad steam locomotive ever operated in Illinois transported a select group to what was then the end-of-track, eight miles east near Chapin, IL, and back to Meredosia. The locomotive was called the "Rogers" and was made in Newark, New Jersey, by the firm of Rogers, Ketchum and Grosvenor.

For nearly 10 years, the growing Northern Cross Railroad was operated by the State of Illinois.

By 1842, a line between Jacksonville and Springfield was completed, and in May, 1842, service from Meredosia to Springfield was made available. In 1854, the Northern Cross reached Decatur, Illinois. In December, 1856, the line was completed between Springfield and the Illinois-Indiana state line.

The year 1847 saw the first change in the new railroad. The legislature of the State of Illinois authorized the sale of the original track between Meredosia and Springfield to Nicholas H. Ridgely, who paid $21,000 for the road. He changed its name to the Sangamon and Morgan Railroad.

The part of the line from Springfield to the Illinois-Indiana state line had been temporarily abandoned by the State of Illinois due to a funding shortage. Ridgely was eventually granted an extension of his charter to include the entire line of the Northern Cross, which he reopened to Decatur.

== Origin of the Northern Cross ==
In 1837, the Illinois Internal Improvement Act was passed with funding for rail lines - the Illinois Central Railroad's Galena to Cairo line, and crossing it, the Northern Cross connecting Danville, Springfield, and Quincy and the Southern Cross from Mt. Carmel to Alton (in a bid to compete with St. Louis, Missouri). They were to be part of a system of railroads funded by the state to connect population centers. A compromise was negotiated in which money for river improvements was included in the bill (including $100,000 for the Illinois River).

The land for the Northern Cross Railroad was surveyed and a contract was bid to build the line between the autumn of 1837 to April 1838 along a twelve-mile strip from Meredosia to a 19th-century settlement called Morgan City (not current IL town). The name Northern Cross reflects the fact that the northern half of the state of Illinois was still very sparsely settled in the 1830s.

== Construction ==
The construction method was to lay "parallel lines of mud sills (ballast), eight or ten inches square, under where the rails would come", in places that did not have a firm foundation. On top of these sills were laid 4-by-6-inch or 4-by-8-inch oak "stringers" notched and pinned together. The rails were flat iron straps (section of rail) 12 to 15 feet long, two-and-a-half inches wide, and only five-eighths of an inch thick. Spikes held them onto the stringers, and their ends were mitered. As the rails were used, these ends often curled up, causing damage (snakeheads) to the undercarriages of the cars and serious injury or death to unlucky passengers.

== Rolling stock ==
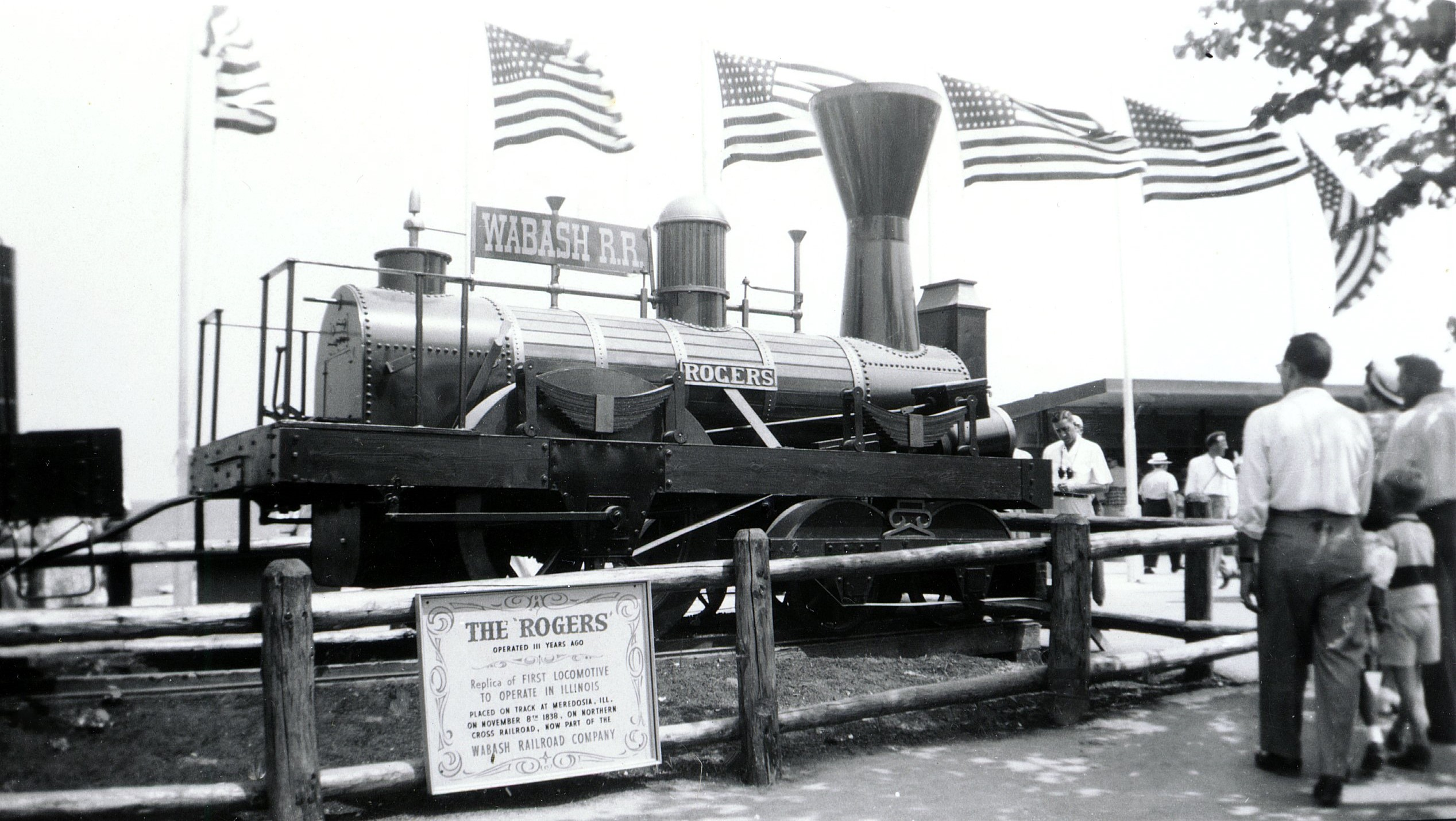
A replica of the first Northern Cross locomotive, the Rogers, as displayed by the Wabash at the Chicago Railroad Fair. The replica was constructed by the railroad in their Decatur, Illinois shops in the late 1940s, and it was extensively used by the Wabash in parades (powered by a Case tractor underneath) and town centennial celebrations throughout the 1950s.

Passengers cars were the size of buses, with a row of seats down either side. Even though the trains ran at a comparatively slow speed, passengers slid down the seats because the train's link and pin system of coupling cars caused jerks on starting and stopping. In the engines, water hoses could freeze in the winter, and passengers may have had to help crew load wood at refueling stations. None of the signals, specialty cars, telegraph, and amenities known today existed on early rail lines.

The rolling stock consisted of the locomotive made by Rogers, Ketchum and Grosvenor of Newark, New Jersey. "The Rogers" was shipped in pieces to Meredosia by riverboat, accompanied by the engineer in charge of assembling it. Locals were taught to run the engine.

== Line extension ==
In 1842, after the state had recovered from the Panic of 1837, the line was extended from Springfield to Jacksonville. Its one locomotive wore out by 1844. The state ran the deteriorating line until 1847, then auctioned it for $21,000 (2.5% of its original cost) to Nicholas Ridgely, who renamed it the Sangamon and Morgan. The line remained closed until settlement and costs allowed more railroads to be built in this part of Illinois.

In later years, the Northern Cross was acquired by and incorporated into the Wabash Railroad.
