= Erie Western Railway =

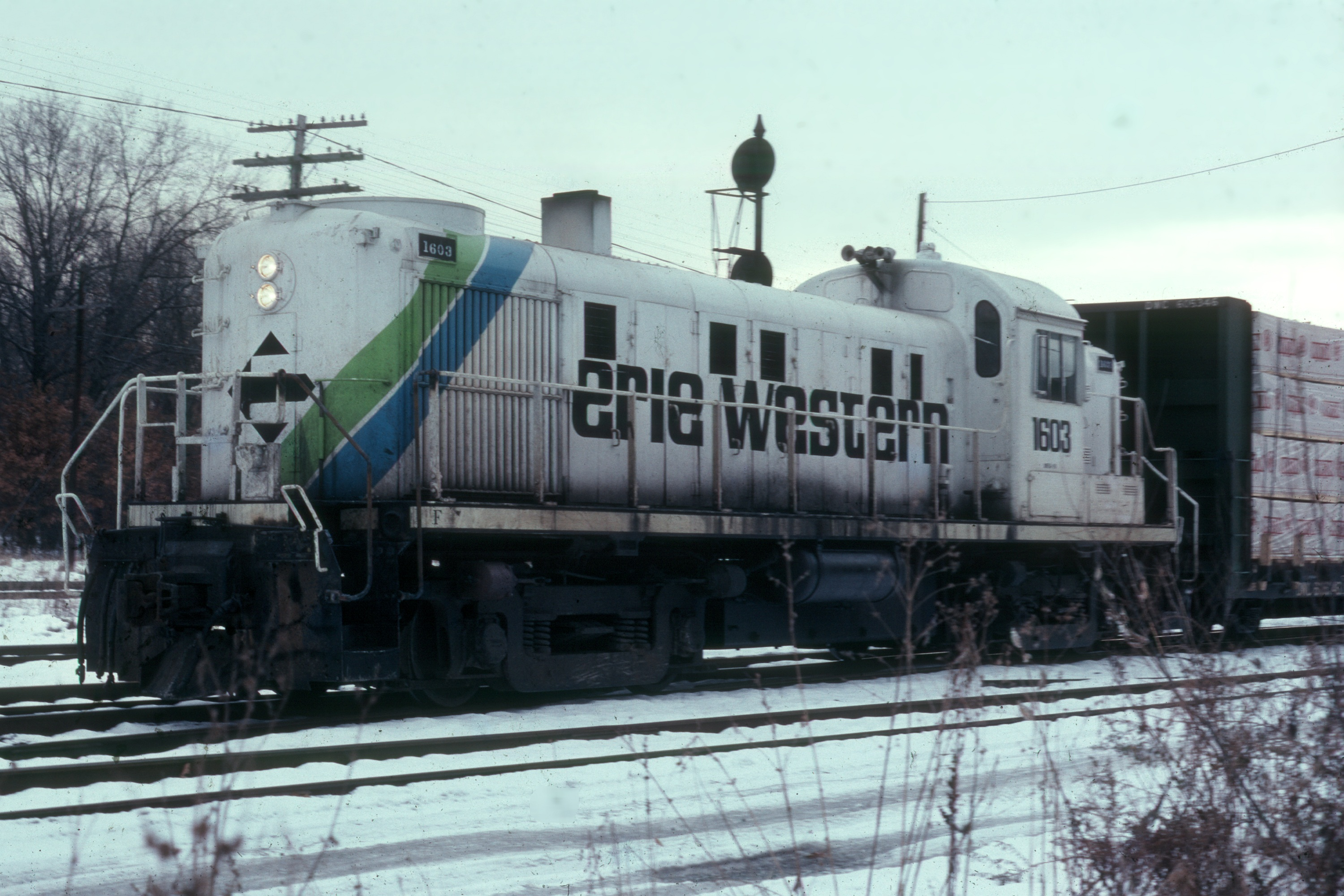
- Erie Western #1603 in Hammond, Indiana in 1978

Overview
- Headquarters: Huntington, Indiana
- Reporting mark: ERES
- Locale: Ohio and Indiana
- Dates of operation: 1977–1979
- Successor: Chicago & Indiana Railroad

Technical
- Track gauge: 4 ft 8 1/2 in (1,435 mm) standard gauge

The Erie Western Railway (reporting mark ERES) was a Class III railroad operating in Illinois and Indiana from 1977 until 1979, operating a segment of the former Erie Lackawanna mainline that was not included in the Conrail Final System Plan.

== History ==
The Erie Western was incorporated in August 1977 and began operations under an Interstate Commerce Commission car service order on September 25, 1977, to operate freight service for 158 miles on the former Erie Lackawanna Railway main line from the Indiana/Ohio state line near Wren, Ohio west to Hammond, Indiana. The railroad also operated a 27-mile branch line extending from Decatur, Indiana to Portland, Indiana. The Erie Western also possessed ICC-granted rights to operate from Hammond to Chicago on trackage rights over the Chicago and Western Indiana Railroad.

The Erie Western was created because the former main line of the Erie Lackawanna Railway, which went bankrupt in 1972, was not included in the federal government's creation of Conrail, prompting the Erie Western to be formed by shippers and others who wanted to retain and preserve rail service. The railroad was operated by Craig Burroughs' Joliet, Illinois-based Trans-Action Associates.

Conrail began operations on the Erie Lackawanna and other Northeastern rail lines on April 1, 1976. The Erie Lackawanna mainline west of Marion, Ohio, was not conveyed to Conrail because of the Erie Lackawanna's 11th hour entry into the Final System Plan. The ownership of this line remained with the Erie Lackawanna Estate, which was a holding company to which all of the railroad's outstanding debt was transferred. However, since all locomotives and rolling stock were conveyed to Conrail, Conrail was responsible for continuing freight service to customers along the Erie Lackawanna mainline. The condition of this service was only until a suitable short line could assume operations. Conrail's local freight service lasted from April 1976 until September 1977 when Erie Western was formed and began operations.

The Erie Western's headquarters office was at 10 W. Franklin Street in Huntington, Indiana.

The railroad began operations with seven locomotives: three Alco C420s (which previously had belonged to the Long Island Rail Road) and four Alco RS-3s.

Commodities hauled include grain, lumber, fertilizer, steel, food products, manufactured goods and plastic.

The railroad failed and discontinued operations on June 24, 1979. Operations were replaced by a short-lived operator, the Chicago & Indiana Railroad (CINR). The Chicago & Indiana discontinued operations on December 31, 1979.

After the failure of both the Erie Western and Chicago and Indiana, the Erie Lackawanna Estate realized that the real estate value of this right of way could be used to offset the debts incurred during and after Erie Lackawanna's bankruptcy. Realizing that profitable local freight service was no longer achievable, mostly due to the increase in trucking shipments, the Erie Lackawanna Estate sold the mainline, and all wayside signalling and structures, to L.B. Foster Company. L.B. Foster's sole intent was to remove the trackage and sell the ties, rails, and ballast to other railroads, and sell the physical right of way to local farmers and developers. The Erie Lackawanna right of way was mostly removed by 1983.

== North Judson-Monterey segment ==
After December 31, 1979, the Tippecanoe Railroad Co. took over operations of a 16-mile stretch of the railroad from North Judson, Indiana to Monterey, Indiana that was known as the JK Line. In the spring of 1990, the Tippecanoe Railroad was sold to another operator, Daniel R. Frick, and renamed J.K. Line. In 2003, the operator of J.K. Line, the Toledo, Peoria and Western Railway, applied for and later received permission from the federal government to abandon the 16-mile line.

The line has been removed and has been named the Monterey Bike Trail.
