= Alton and Southern Railway =

Railway in Illinois

Alton & Southern Railway
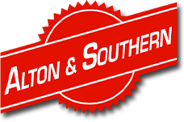

Overview
- Headquarters: East St Louis, Illinois
- Reporting mark: ALS
- Locale: Greater St. Louis
- Dates of operation: 1913–present
- Successor: Missouri Pacific Railroad and Chicago and North Western Railway

Technical
- Track gauge: 4 ft 8 1/2 in (1,435 mm) standard gauge

Other
- Website: altonsouthern.com

The Alton and Southern Railway (reporting mark ALS) is a switching railroad in the Greater St. Louis area in Illinois. It is a wholly owned subsidiary of the Union Pacific Railroad.

== Overview ==
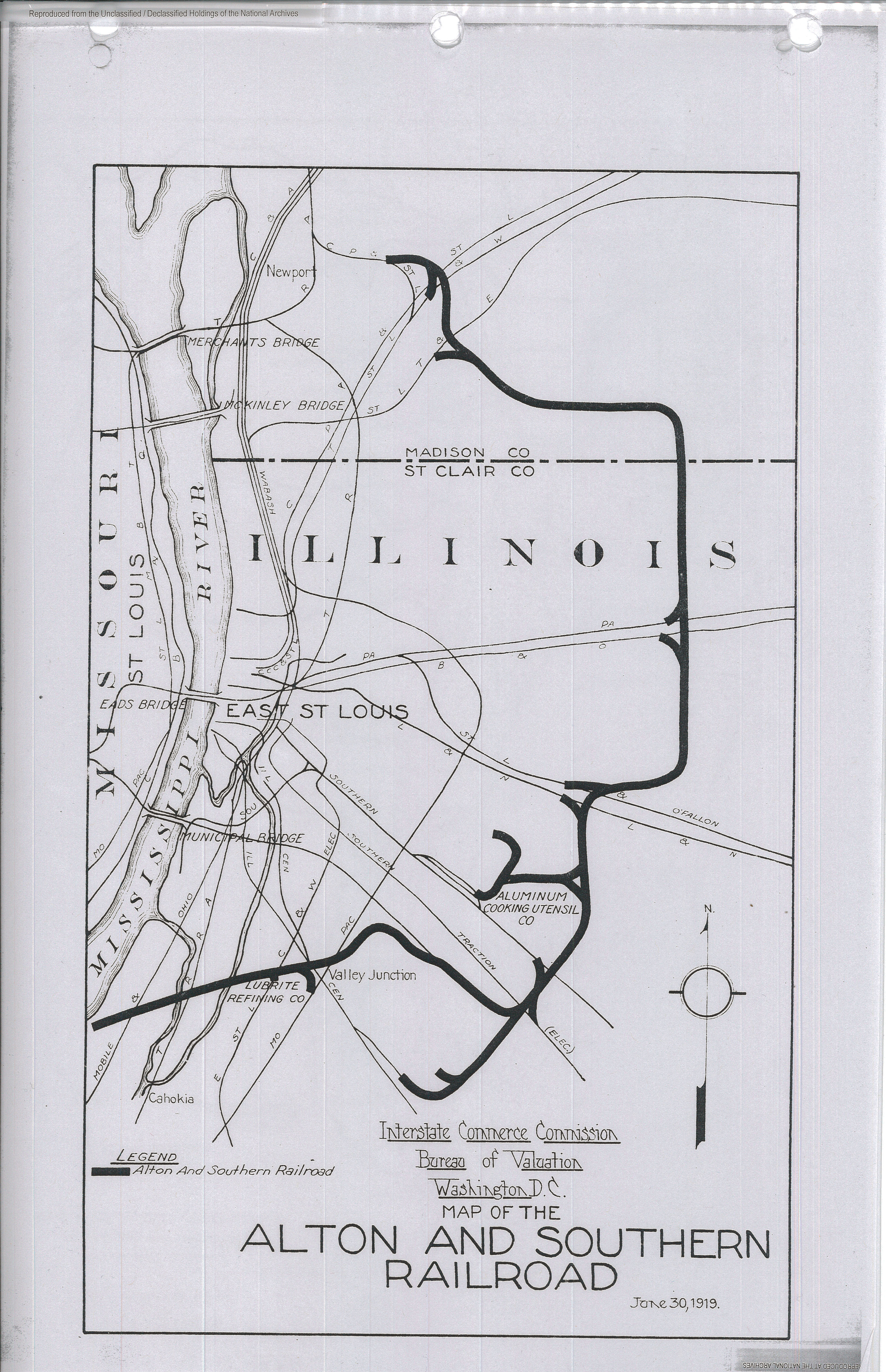
Map of the Alton and Southern Railroad

The Alton and Southern Railroad was formed in 1910, and in 1913 it absorbed the Denverside Connecting Railway (founded in 1910), and the Alton and Southern Railway (founded in 1911). The company was operated as a subsidiary of the Aluminum Ore Company, which was itself a subsidiary of the Aluminum Company of America (Alcoa), to serve the Bayer process bauxite-to-alumina refinery at Alorton, Illinois.

Alcoa sold the line to the Missouri Pacific Railroad and Chicago and North Western Railway (CNW) in 1968, and it was reorganized as the Alton and Southern Railway. In 1972, CNW's share was sold to the St. Louis Southwestern Railway. In 1982, the Union Pacific Railroad (UP) took ownership of the Missouri Pacific share and then became full owner in 1996 with the acquisition of SSW parent Southern Pacific Transportation Company. The Alton and Southern is still a legally separate entity but is wholly owned by UP.
