= Illinois Southern Railway =

Defunct American railway

The Illinois Southern Railway, a precursor to the Cairo and Vincennes Railroad, was chartered in Illinois on 6 May 1867. It is shown as Illinois Southern RR (and Rwy) on the 1861 and 1870 railroad maps of Illinois.
