= A&R Terminal Railroad =

American terminal railroad

Overview
- Headquarters: Morris, Illinois
- Reporting mark: ARTR
- Locale: Morris Transload
- Dates of operation: 2010–present

Technical
- Track gauge: 4 ft 8 1/2 in (1,435 mm) standard gauge
- Length: 6.25 mi (10.06 km)

The A&R Terminal Railroad (reporting mark ARTR) is a Class III American terminal railroad that serves Morris Transload of Morris, Illinois. ARTR is owned by Quantix (formerly A&R Logistics) and began operations on January 1, 2010. Its main commodity is transloadable products. ARTR interchanges traffic with Canadian National Railway.

The total mileage of track the ARTR owns is approximately 6.25 miles (10.06km).
