= Ag Valley Railroad =

Railroad in Chicago, Illinois

AG Valley Railroad
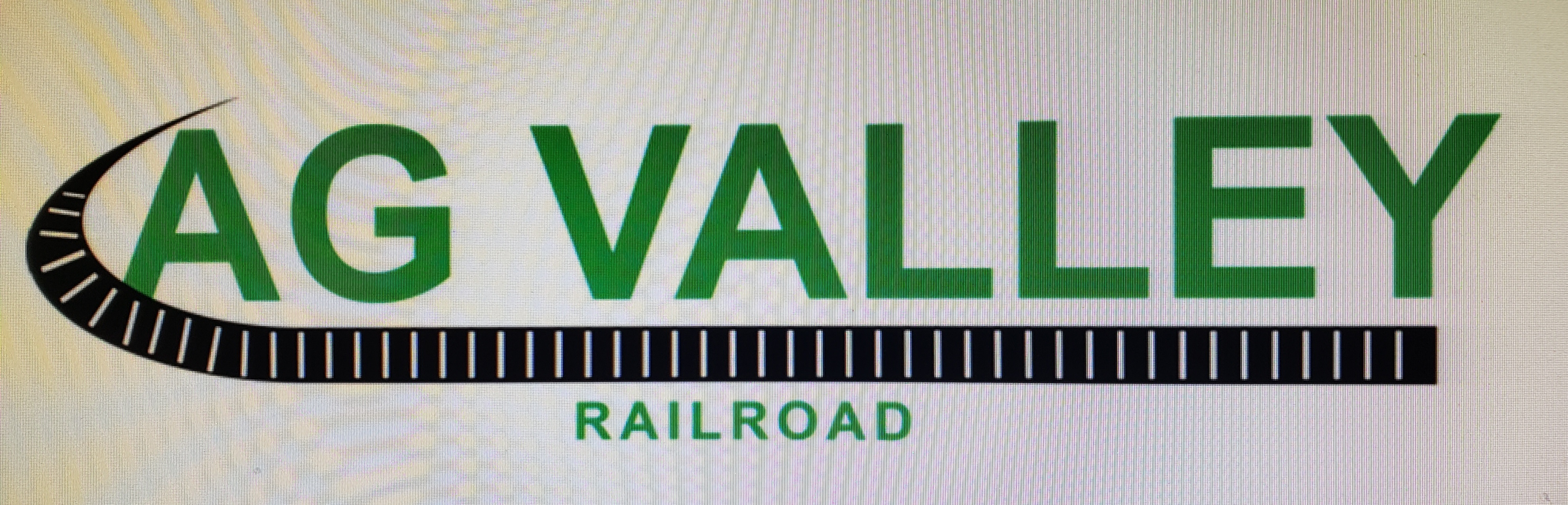

Overview
- Headquarters: Chicago, Illinois
- Reporting mark: AVRR
- Locale: Chicago, Illinois
- Dates of operation: 2013–Present

Technical
- Track gauge: 4 ft 8 1/2 in (1,435 mm) standard gauge
- Length: 3.09 mi (4.97 km)

The AG Valley Railroad (reporting mark AVRR) is a Class III switching and terminal railroad servicing the Chicago Transload Facility in Chicago, Illinois on approximately 30.09 miles of track owned by Ag Valley Holdings, LLC. AVRR began operations on January 8, 2013.

All of the AG Valley tracks are located in the Chicago community area of South Deering on the city's far south side, between E. 100th St. and E. 104th St. and run roughly parallel to Torrence Avenue. The railroad interchanges with the Chicago Rail Link to receive inbound loads of vegetable co-products and ship outbound loads of animal feed ingredients and bio-diesel feed stocks.

This railroad should not be confused with the similarly-named Ag Valley Co-Op (reporting mark AGVX) which operates in Edison and Maywood, Nebraska.
