= Chicago, Madison and Northern Railroad (1886–1903) =

Former railroad company

Overview
- Parent company: Illinois Central Railroad
- Dates of operation: 1886–1903
- Successor: Illinois Central Railroad

Technical
- Track gauge: 1,435 mm (4 ft 8 1/2 in)
- Length: 233 miles (375 km)

The Chicago, Madison, and Northern Railroad was a railroad company in the United States. It was established by the Illinois Central Railroad in 1886 to construct a new direct railroad line from Chicago to Madison, Wisconsin. The line opened in 1888 and the company was merged into the Illinois Central in 1903. The Freeport Subdivision between Chicago and Freeport, Illinois, remains in operation.

== History ==
In the 1880s the network of the Illinois Central Railroad resembled a wishbone, centered on Centralia, Illinois. From there, lines ran north to Freeport, Illinois, northeast to Chicago, and south to New Orleans. For direct east–west service between Chicago and Freeport and point west, the Illinois Central used the tracks of the Chicago, Burlington and Quincy Railroad. To eliminate these costs the Illinois Central decided to build its own route between Chicago and Freeport.

The Illinois Central's plan included a new line between Chicago and Madison, Wisconsin, via Freeport, a branch to Dodgeville, Wisconsin, and a short branch from South Addison, Illinois, to Addison, Illinois. It established five companies for this purpose, three in Illinois and two in Wisconsin:

1. The Chicago, Madison and Northern Railroad, an Illinois company, to build from Chicago to Freeport and then the Wisconsin state line. Incorporated on August 2, 1886.
2. The Chicago, Madison and Northern Railroad, a Wisconsin company, to build from the Wisconsin state line to Madison. Incorporated on August 2, 1886.
3. The Freeport, Dodgeville and Northern Railroad, an Illinois company, to build from Freeport to the Wisconsin state line. Incorporated on May 20, 1887.
4. The Freeport, Dodgeville and Northern Railroad, a Wisconsin company, to build from the Wisconsin state line to Dodgeville. Incorporated on May 21, 1887.
5. The Addison Railroad, to build from South Addison to Addison. Incorporated on July 22, 1890.

The two Chicago, Madison and Northern Railroad companies were consolidated into a single company, still called the Chicago, Madison and Northern Railroad, on April 16, 1887. That company and the two Freeport, Dodgeville and Northern Railroad companies were consolidated into a single company, also still called the Chicago, Madison and Northern Railroad, on March 12, 1888. The Addison Railroad was conveyed to the Chicago, Madison and Northern Railroad on January 5, 1892.

Construction of the new line began in 1886 and was completed under the unified company in 1888. Trains did not begin using the St. Charles Air Line to reach Great Central Station (and later Central Station) until 1891. The Addison Railroad completed its 2-mile (3.2 km) branch to Addison prior to the 1892 conveyance. Always under the control of the Illinois Central Railroad, the Chicago, Madison and Northern Railroad was merged on February 1, 1903.

== Lines ==
The Chicago, Madison and Northern Railroad owned 233 miles (375 km) of track in the states of Illinois and Wisconsin:

- its main line between Chicago and Madison, 173 miles (278 km). The line between Chicago and Freeport, now the Freeport Subdivision of the Canadian National Railway, remains in active use. The line between Freeport and Madison, the Madison District, was sold by the Illinois Central Gulf Railroad to the state of Wisconsin in 1980. After a period of operation by short-line railroads, it was abandoned and converted into the Badger State Trail in 1998.
- the Dodgeville branch between Red Oak, Illinois, and Dodgeville, Wisconsin. The Interstate Commerce Commission approved the abandonment of the entire 58-mile (93 km) line in 1942.
- the Addison branch between South Addison and Addison. The ICC approved the abandonment of the branch in 1989.
