= American Central Railway =

Railway company in the US

The American Central Railway was a 19th-century railroad company that operated in western Illinois during the era of rapid railway expansion following the Civil War. Originally incorporated as the Western Air Line Railroad, the company was reincorporated on February 21, 1859, under the name American Central Railway. The Western Airline had not laid any track prior to 1859.

Construction began nearly a decade later in 1868 on a 50.59 mile line connecting Galva, Illinois to New Boston, Illinois, serving the agricultural communities along the Mississippi River corridor. Work was completed in October 1869. Like many smaller regional railroads of the period, the American Central Railway was eventually absorbed by a larger system when it was sold to the Chicago, Burlington and Quincy Railroad on June 1, 1899.
