= Material Sciences Corporation =

American materials technology company

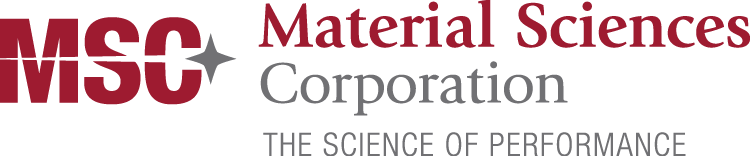
- Company type: Private
- Traded as: Nasdaq: MASC
- Industry: Industrial equipment and components
- Founded: 1951; 75 years ago
- Headquarters: Canton, Michigan, United States
- Products: Acoustical material-based and coated material-based solutions
- Services: Engineering services and testing services
- Revenue: US$112.64M (Nov 30, 2013)
- Number of employees: 267 (Nov 30, 2013)
- Website: www.materialsciencescorp.com

Material Sciences Corporation is an American materials technology company. It began as All Weather Steel Products in Chicago in 1951. It is now headquartered in Canton, Michigan. The company provides engineering and testing solutions for acoustical and coated applications. The company owns five manufacturing plants, in Elk Grove Village, Illinois; East Chicago, Indiana; Walbridge, Ohio; Canfield, Ohio; and Toronto. It has sales offices in Burr Ridge, Illinois, Turin, and Shanghai.
