= Macomb and Western Illinois Railway =

Railroad based in Macomb, Illinois, linking to Industry and Littleton

Overview
- Headquarters: Macomb, Illinois
- Locale: Illinois (McDonough and Schuyler counties)
- Dates of operation: 1904–1930

Technical
- Track gauge: 4 ft 8 1/2 in (1,435 mm) standard gauge

The Macomb and Western Illinois Railway was chartered on October 26, 1901. The railroad was built south along Johnson Street in Macomb, Illinois, to nearby Industry and Littleton by local financier Charles V. Chandler. It was open for service on January 1, 1904. It ran for about twenty-five years.

== History ==
Promoter and builder Charles V. Chandler intended the Macomb and Western Illinois Railway (M&WI) as a local road to provide freight and passenger service to and from locations between Macomb and Littleton, to give farmers a way of transporting grain and livestock to Macomb, and to eventually connect Macomb with the national railway network. Planned as an electric interurban but lacking sufficient capital to construct the necessary infrastructure, the railroad began service with a primitive - and marginally useful - gas-electric locomotive.

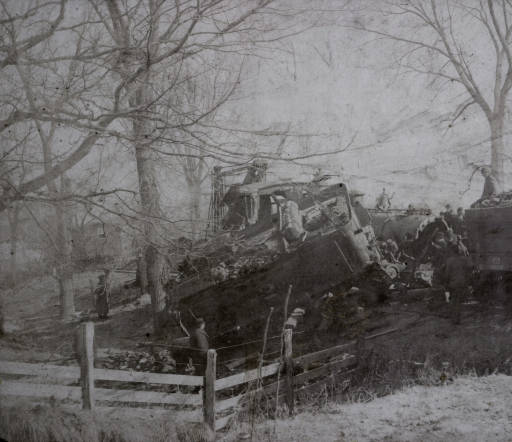
Derailment south of Industry, 1905

The railroad encountered problems from the start. Many people were opposed to the expansion of Chandler's business empire and of his influence as the town's leading Republican. Many who before had helped fund similar projects pulled out. The railroad's president and C. V.'s business partner sold his interest in the business within two years to Chandler. A year after service began the railroad's engine house burned down, destroying its gas-electric locomotive. The local Illinois bituminous coal hauled from mines near Littleton had a sulfur content that rendered it unmarketable for most industrial and domestic uses. The track was lightweight and roadbed was marginal at best, and consequently derailments were common. Property owners along Johnson Street in Macomb filed a series of lawsuits to evict the railroad from the city streets, efforts which were eventually successful and which also had the effect of scaring off investors.

In 1910 the Bank of Macomb, owned by C.V. Chandler, went bankrupt and Chandler later left town to live with his son in Indianapolis. As part of the bankruptcy the M&WI was sold to the Chicago House Wrecking Company, which intended to abandon the railroad and sell it for scrap.

In 1913, the railroad was bought back by a group of local farmers and merchants from the area and was reorganized as the Macomb, Industry & Littleton Railway (MI&L). This railroad operated through the remainder of the 1910s and 1920s. Starting in 1925, however, the railroad's fortunes began to decline due to the construction of hard (paved) roads paralleling the right-of-way. The decline in traffic, coupled with increased maintenance costs from a decaying infrastructure, led to the railroad's abandonment in 1930. In that year the railroad's assets were sold at auction, the tracks were torn up and all of the rolling stock except for one steam engine was scrapped.

== Right-of-way ==
Originally the M&WI started at its north end where Johnson Street in Macomb crosses the CB&Q. There was an interchange with the Burlington at that location, from which the tracks proceeded down the center of Johnson Street to the edge of town. Just south of St. Francis Hospital the railroad crossed onto private right-of-way running along the west side of South Johnson Street (later known as St. Francis Blacktop). South of Beaumont Road the line curved and headed straight east before entering Industry from the northwest on a winding alignment. South of Industry the railroad headed more-or-less straight south until the Carters Creek crossing, after which it curved gently to the west before assuming a direct north-south alignment down the east side of Main Street in Littleton.

In late 1904 a lawsuit brought against the railroad compelled it to tear up the block and a half of tracks north of Jackson Street in Macomb, severing its link with the CB&Q. A belt line was constructed to enable interchange of equipment on the west side of Macomb; this line split off the main line just south of St. Francis Hospital. At this location a wye, engine house and small yard was constructed. In 1908 all trackage on Johnson Street was torn up following another lawsuit, and thereafter M&WI (and later MI&L) trains accessed downtown Macomb via a trackage rights agreement with the Burlington.

There were several sidings along the railroad. These were located at Henderson, Andrews, Four Mile, Industry (two sidings), Runkle, and Littleton. There was also a wye with an engine house on the south side of Littleton.

== Rolling stock ==
The railroad owned a succession of locomotives during its life, listed here in chronological order of acquisition:

- 1 - Baldwin 0-4-4T, ex-Chicago Union Terminal, ex-South Side Rapid Transit, acq 1903
- unnumbered - six-wheel gas-electric boxcab, built new 1903
- 2 - 4-4-0, acq between 1904 and 1907, destroyed in Industry wreck in 1907
- 4 - 4-4-0, acq prior to 1907, scrapped c1915
- 5 - Davenport 2-6-0, acq new 1914, sold 1930
- 6 - Pittsburgh 4-4-0, acq used 1915, scrapped 1928

The railroad also owned four passenger cars and about eight freight cars during its life. The railroad constructed a six-wheel gas-electric boxcab locomotive on top of a Pullman passenger car truck in 1903. While it proved too under-powered to pull more than a single car and was destroyed in a fire after only a few months, it is notable as possibly the first internal-combustion locomotive of any kind to see revenue service in North America.

== Structures ==
=== Macomb ===
The original depot at Macomb was located at the corner of Jackson and Johnson Streets and was located in the front room of a blacksmith shop. It is believed that this was abandoned when the tracks on Johnson were torn up in 1908. Thereafter the Burlington depot was used, although the MI&L may have had a separate office on the north side of the tracks during the 1920s.

Structures at the Macomb Yards included a one-stall engine house, a water tank and a tool shed. The original engine house burned down in December 1904 but it was rebuilt.

=== Industry ===
The Industry depot was a small frame structure erected in 1904. Other structures at Industry included a water tower and tool shed built the same year, a stock yard, and an elevator. These structures were all located directly to the west of First Street.

=== Littleton ===
The original Littleton depot was a frame structure built in the "Pagoda" style. It was torn down or relocated by Chicago House Wrecking in 1914, and was replaced the following year by a concrete block depot located on the south side of Broadway. Railroad facilities at Littleton also included a stock yard and elevator located north of Broadway as well as a one-stall engine house located at the wye on the southwest side of town. During the railroad's early years there was also a mine superstructure located astride the wye that was used to load coal cars.

=== Intermediate locations ===
During the MI&L years there were waiting shelters located at Andrews, Kirkpatrick and Runkle. The Kirkpatrick shelter actually consisted of an old coach body while the others were corrugated metal structures. There were stock yards at Andrews, Kirkpatrick and Runkle, as well as an elevator at Kirkpatrick. Other structures may have existed at some of these locations at certain times.

== Remaining traces ==
Portions of the original roadbed, right-of-way and bridge approaches can still be found parallel (west side) to South Johnson Road, also known locally as the St. Francis blacktop (named for a former Catholic hospital, which closed in 1970, in southwest Macomb). The grade embankment and roadbed just southwest of the old St. Francis Hospital property is still in place. This is where the route turned northwest for its eventual interchange with the Burlington (CB&Q). Another embankment on either side of Grindstone Creek on the northwest side of Industry is still in evidence. A sizeable concrete culvert over Sugar Creek on the north side of Littleton is still there, and the embankment at that location is used for an access road. The Littleton depot was intact until destroyed by a tornado in 1981.
