= Joliet Junction Railroad =

Railroad in Illinois, US, 1994 to 1999

The Joliet Junction Railroad was a six-mile long short line freight railroad that operated in the Joliet, Illinois, area from 1994 until 1999.

== History ==
The line, which ran between Crest Hill and Rockdale, Illinois, was a former branch line of the Elgin, Joliet and Eastern (EJ&E) Railway, which had been out of service since 1991, after a fire severely damaged a wooden trestle.

In 1994, Minooka, Illinois, businessman Donald L. "Don" Bachman, who owned a locomotive-rebuilding company called Relco, founded the Joliet Junction Railroad, acquiring its trackage from the EJ&E, which had sought to abandon it after the fire. Bachman learned that it would cost $90,000 to replace the bridge, plus significantly more for other expenses to bring the line up to code. As a result, he applied for and received a $390,000 loan from the Illinois Department of Transportation to fund additional improvements.

== Abandonment ==
The Joliet Junction Railroad ceased operations in the summer of 1999. Bachman and Relco then sold the trackage for $467,424 to the Forest Preserve District of Will County, which created a bike path, called the Joliet Junction bike trail, over the former right-of-way.

== Connections ==
The Joliet Junction connected local shippers with the national railroad network at two connection points: with the EJ&E at Crest Hill, Illinois, and with CSX Transportation at Rockdale, Illinois.
