= Keithsburg Rail Bridge =

Keithsburg Bridge
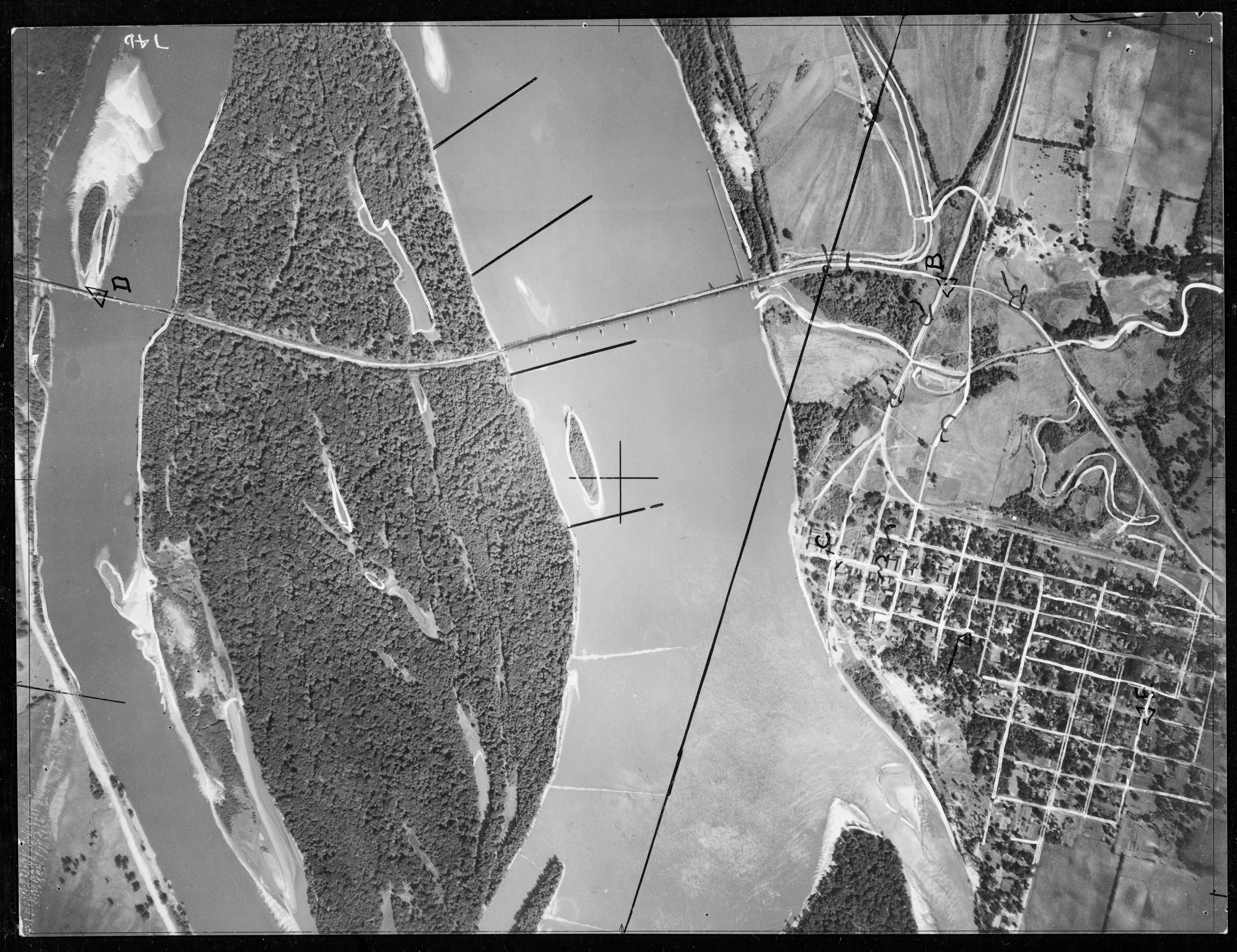
- A 1927 aerial view of Keithsburg and the railroad bridge
- Coordinates: 41°06′18″N 90°57′10″W
- Carries: Abandoned single-track railroad, formerly Chicago & Northwestern
- Crosses: Mississippi River
- Locale: Iowa and Keithsburg, Illinois

Characteristics
- Design: Pratt-truss with vertical-lift mainspan
- Longest span: 220 feet (67 m)

History
- Designer: Waddell & Harrington
- Opened: 1909
- Closed: June 21, 1981 (main span only)

Location
- Interactive map of Keithsburg Bridge

The Keithsburg Bridge was a vertical lift bridge that carried a single railroad track across the Mississippi River between Louisa County, Iowa and Keithsburg, Illinois.

The bridge was constructed for the Minneapolis and St. Louis Railway in 1909 and traffic across the bridge was discontinued in 1971 by then owner Chicago and North Western, who had purchased the M&StL in 1960. After the line was abandoned, the vertical lift was locked in the up position for several years until the lift portion was accidentally destroyed by fireworks and the ensuing fire on June 21, 1981. The 220-foot (67 m) vertical lift section fell into the river blocking barge traffic on the main channel of the Mississippi River for more than a week until it was removed by the US Army Corps of Engineers. The USGS aerial photo from March 2000, and satellite mapping views taken since then, show the bridge standing but missing its vertical lift section.

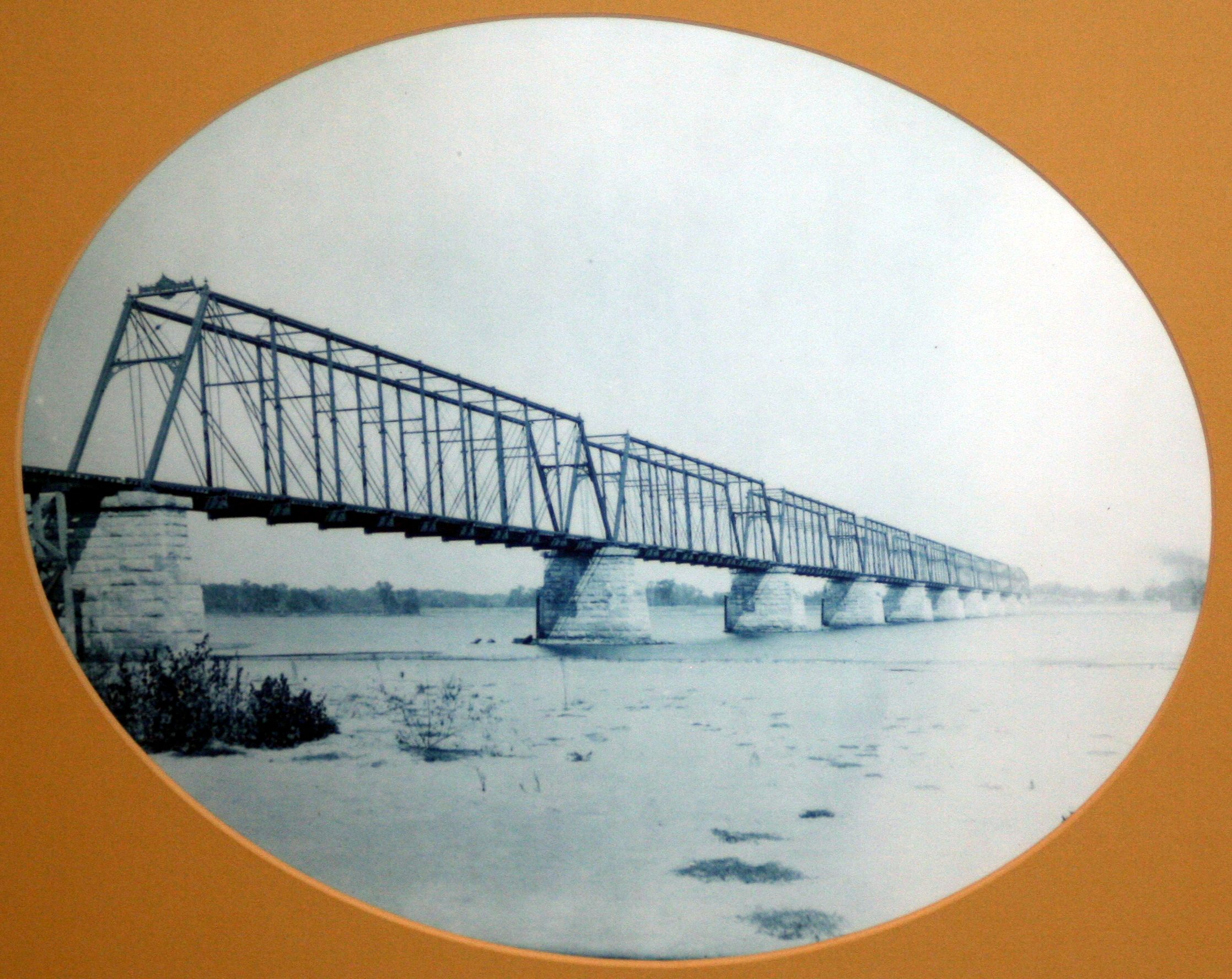
Iowa Central railroad bridge (1889)

This bridge replaced a previous Iowa Central railroad bridge, constructed in 1886 by the Phoenix Bridge Company, that crossed at the same location. As of 2014, the old stone piers from the previous bridge were still standing next to the current bridge.

== See also ==
- List of crossings of the Upper Mississippi River
