= Joppa and Eastern Railroad =

American railway company

The Joppa and Eastern Railroad (reporting mark JE) is an American railway company that is subsidiary of Ameren, that was mainly used for delivering Powder River Coal to the Joppa Generating Station power plant on the Ohio River, just west of Joppa, Illinois. They own numerous hopper cars with the JE reporting mark, and use Union Pacific motive power.
