= Chicago, Indiana and Southern Railroad =

Former railroad in Illinois and Indiana

Map

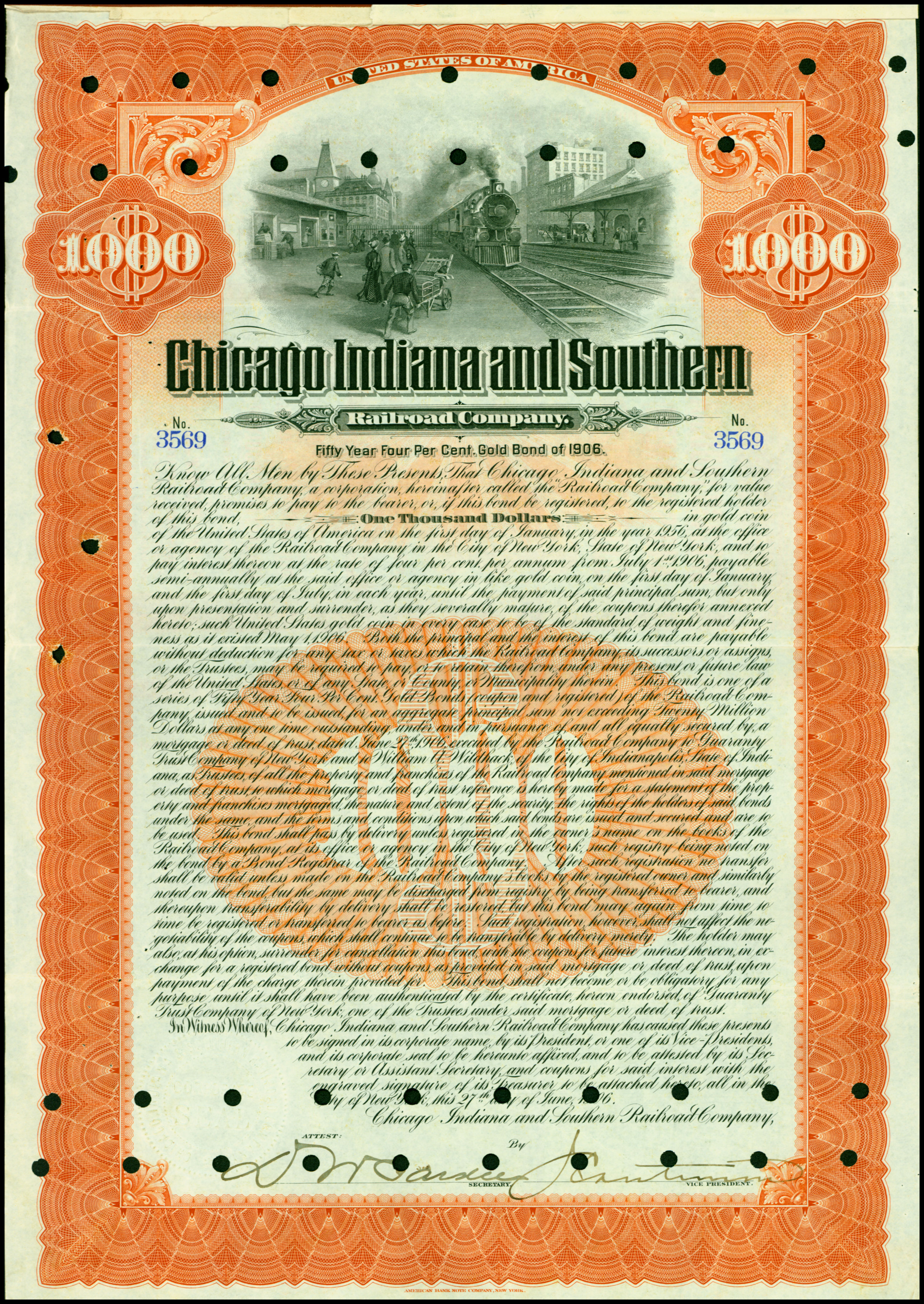
Gold Bond of the Chicago Indiana and Southern Railroad Company, issued 27. June 1906

The Chicago, Indiana and Southern Railroad (reporting mark CI&S) is a former railroad which operated in the states of Illinois and Indiana during the early 20th century. The CI&S formed in 1906 from the consolidation of the two other railroads: the Indiana, Illinois and Iowa Railroad and the Indiana Harbor Railroad. The new railroad also owned the capital stock of the Danville and Indiana Harbor Railroad. The stock of the new company itself was wholly owned by the Lake Shore and Michigan Southern Railway and the Michigan Central Railroad, both of which were part of the New York Central system. A 1907 report called the CI&S a "tributary to the Lake Shore." The railroad operated two lines: a north–south line between Indiana Harbor (East Chicago, Indiana) and Danville, Illinois, and a line from the Spring Valley coalfields at Seatonville, Illinois, to South Bend, Indiana. Together the two lines controlled 301 miles (484 km) of track. In 1914 the CI&S was one of several railroads consolidated to form the modern New York Central Railroad.
