= Springfield, Clear Lake and Rochester Railway =

The Springfield, Clear Lake and Rochester Railway (SCL&R), also known as the Springfield Suburban, was an Illinois electric interurban railway. In operation by 1909 and abandoned by 1912, it offered service between the Illinois state capital of Illinois and the Sangamon County rural towns of Clear Lake and Rochester. Its active network was 11 miles (18 km) in length, with a 7-mile-long main line from Springfield to Rochester and a 4-mile-long branch line to what was then the excursion destination of Clear Lake.

== History ==
The interurban line was incorporated in 1906. One year after going into operation, it was legally reorganized in 1910 as the Mississippi Valley Interurban Railway. Two years later it was no longer operating safely, and the Illinois Railroad and Warehouse Commission ordered in July 1912 that operations be suspended pending urgently required repairs to one or more railroad bridges. The original firm appears to have lacked means to repair the unsafe spans.

Shortly after the suspension, separate promoter groups filed legal papers to recharter the "Springfield, Clear Lake and Southern Railway Company" (August 1912) and the "Mississippi Valley Traction Railway Company" (September 1912). The Springfield, Clear Lake & Southern promoters told the trade press they planned to work with creditors to acquire operating control of the struggling line by foreclosure, make necessary repairs, and build new trackage to the town of Riverton. However, nothing appears to have come of either charter, and the suspension evolved into abandonment.
