= Springfield and Illinois South Eastern Railway =

Map

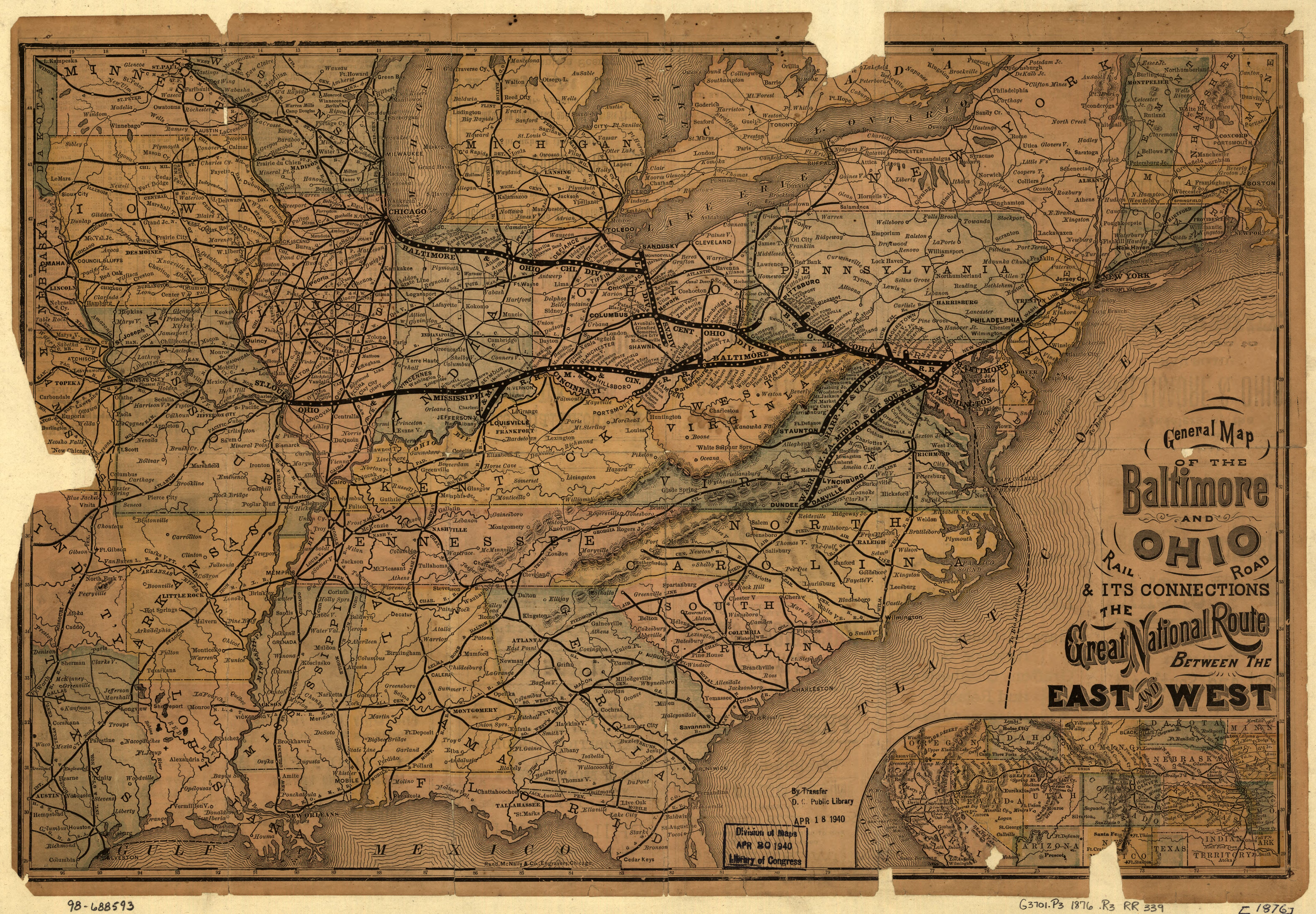
The S&ISE can be seen on this Baltimore and Ohio Railroad map (labeled O&M). It passes through Springfield, Illinois and terminates at Shawneetown (shown as Shawnee T.), Illinois.

Formed in 1870 as a consolidation of the Pana, Springfield and North Western Railroad and Illinois South Eastern Railway, the Springfield and Illinois South Eastern Railway ran from Springfield to Shawneetown, Illinois. It was under construction until at least 1871, when it was noted as having been increased by 140 miles. In 1875, the Ohio and Mississippi Railway acquired the line. It merged in 1893 with the Baltimore and Ohio Southwestern Railroad, now part of CSX Transportation.

Much of the S&ISE railbed has been abandoned. A section from Springfield to Rochester has been paved as the Lost Bridge Trail and another from Taylorville to Pana (Lincoln Prairie Trail) for cyclists and hikers. A movement is afoot to join the two, thus creating a 42-mile trail.

Portions of the old railbed are visible from Illinois Route 13 in the Shawneetown area, and a short segment of track houses two boxcars once used on the route.
