= Riverport Railroad =

Railway line in the United States of America

Riverport Railway
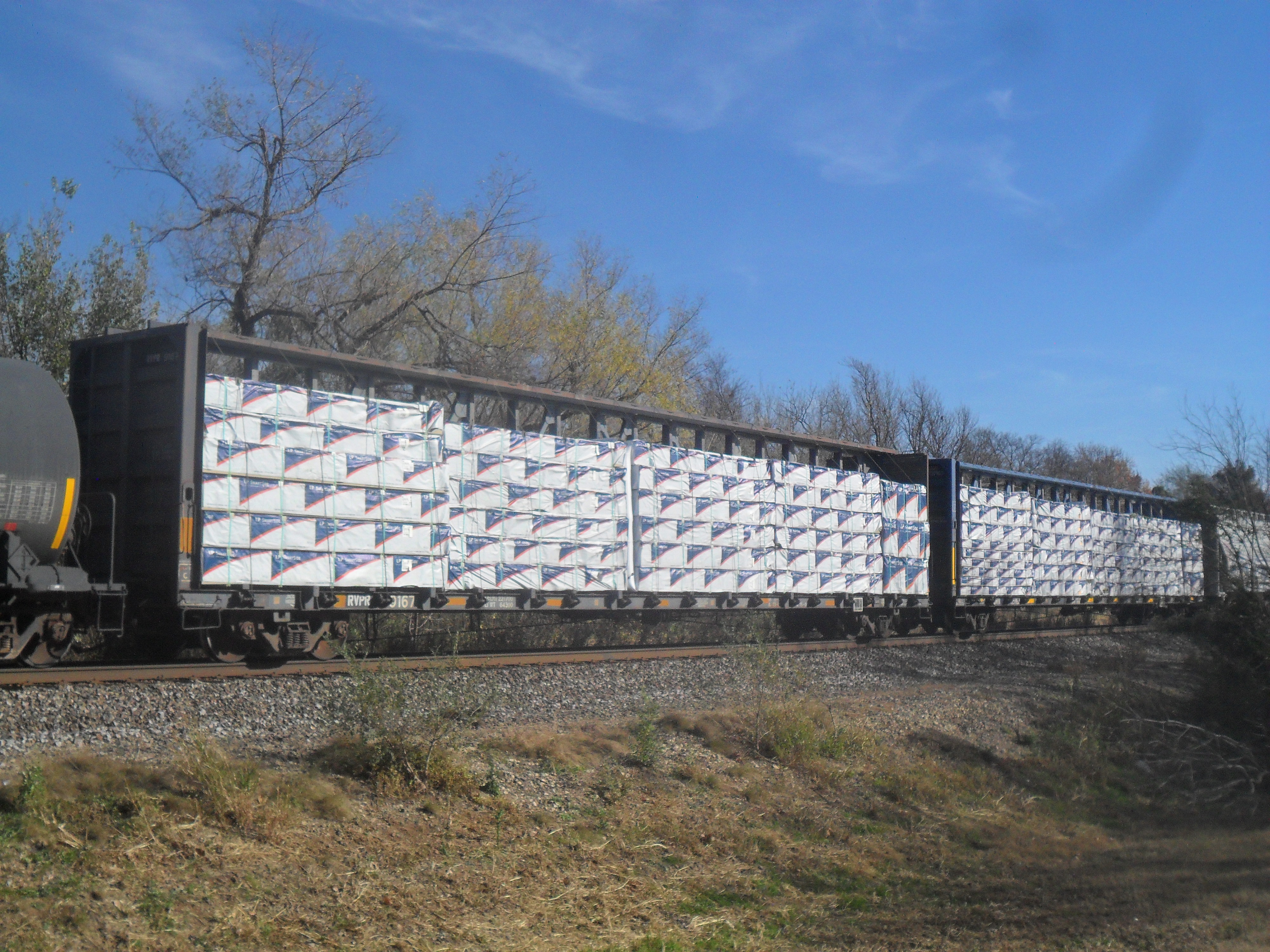
- Centerbeam flatcar from the Riverport Railroad on a freight train in Norman, Oklahoma

Overview
- Headquarters: Savanna, Illinois
- Reporting mark: RVPR
- Locale: Savanna, Illinois
- Dates of operation: Early 2000s–Present
- Predecessor: U.S. Army

Technical
- Track gauge: 4 ft 8 1/2 in (1,435 mm)
- Length: 72-mile (116 km)

Other
- Website: riverportrailroad.com

Riverport Railroad, LLC (reporting mark RVPR) is a privately owned and operated class III short line railroad that serves a commercial, industrial and distribution complex at the former Savanna Army Depot (Savanna Industrial Park) [1] located in Savanna, Illinois. At present RVPR owns a little over 359 acres of land and 73 miles of rail on a railroad right-of-way of 664 acres at the Savanna Industrial Park. In total RVPR owns and or controls approximately 1,995 acres

RVPR offers railcar storage of us to 2,700 railcars;, railcar cleaning and repair (Via the RESCAR company and Inserv (TLC Rail Services)); Transloading Services; along with industrial property development.

RVPR interchanges with the Burlington Northern Santa Fe (BNSF) at Robinson Spur, IL. RVPR is currently services twice a week by BNSF with additional days as needed for unit trains.

== Roster ==
RVPR has a unique roster. One of the companies locomotives are Baldwin RS-4-TC that formerly worked with the U.S. Army.
