= South Chicago and Indiana Harbor Railway =

The South Chicago and Indiana Harbor Railway (reporting mark SCIH), owned by Mittal Steel Company (originally the International Steel Group), is the former Chicago Short Line Railway which operates 27 miles (43 km) of track between Chicago, Illinois and East Chicago, Indiana.

The Chicago Short Line was incorporated in 1900 and leased four miles (6.4 km) of yard and sidings from the adjacent Iroquois Iron Company. By 1919, C&CC&DC owned and operated 7.68 miles (12.36 km) of tracks. until 1906, the railroad interchanged traffic connections in the South Chicago District through trackage-rights agreements with the B & O.

In December 1905, C&CC&DC sold the Iroquois Iron Company a parcel of land for expansion along the lake front. Included was the railroad and its right-of-way. There were some problems at first. Iroquois was a manufacturer incorporated under the General Laws of the State of Illinois, which prohibited manufacturers from operating a railroad. As a result, Iroquois leased the railroad to a new entity, the Chicago Short Line.

In 2003 Chicago Short Line became the South Chicago and Indiana Harbor railroad.

One of SCIH's main sources of revenue from the South Chicago operation was the intra-plant movement of pig iron, loaded slag ladles (to and from the cinder dump), and empty ladles to and from the ladle preparation building. The SCIH also handled substantial tonnages of slag, used by some Midwestern railroads for track ballast.

The railroad owns 4 diesel engines. 2 EMD SW1001's numbered 28 and 29 and two EMD SW1500's numbered 30 and 31.
