= List of Iowa railroads =

The following railroads operate in the U.S. state of Iowa.

== Common freight carriers ==
- Boone and Scenic Valley Railroad (BSVY)
- BNSF Railway (BNSF)
- Burlington Junction Railway (BJRY)
- Canadian National Railway (CN) through subsidiaries Illinois Central Railroad (IC) Cedar River Railroad (CEDR) and Chicago Central and Pacific Railroad (CC)
- Canadian Pacific Kansas City (CPKC) through subsidiary Dakota, Minnesota and Eastern Railroad (DME)
- Cedar Rapids and Iowa City Railway (CIC)
- D&I Railroad (DAIR)
- Iowa Interstate Railroad (IAIS)
- Iowa Northern Railway (IANR)
  - Operates the D&W Railroad
- Iowa Northwestern Railroad (IANW)
- Iowa River Railroad (IARR)
- Iowa Southern Railway (ISRY)
- Iowa Traction Railroad (IATR)
- Keokuk Junction Railway (KJRY)
- Norfolk Southern Railway (NS)
- Union Pacific Railroad (UP)

== Private freight carriers ==
- CBEC Railway
- East Camden and Highland Railroad
- Greater Davenport Redevelopment Corporation

== Passenger carriers ==
- Amtrak (AMTK)
- Fourth Street Elevator

== Defunct railroads ==
Name	Mark	System (Note: This is one or more of the Class I railroads that the railroad became part of, if any.)	From	To	Successor	Notes
Albia and Centerville Railway		MSTL	1890	1910	Southern Iowa Traction Company	
Albia, Knoxville and Des Moines Railroad		CB&Q	1868	1901	Chicago, Burlington and Quincy Railroad	
Ames and College Railway			1890	1907	Fort Dodge, Des Moines and Southern Railroad	
Atchison, Topeka and Santa Fe Railroad		ATSF	1889	1895	Atchison, Topeka and Santa Fe Railway	
Atchison, Topeka and Santa Fe Railway	ATSF	ATSF	1895	1996	Burlington Northern and Santa Fe Railway	
Atlantic and Audubon Railroad		RI	1878	1880	Chicago, Rock Island and Pacific Railway	
Atlantic Northern Railway			1913	1936	N/A	
Atlantic Northern and Southern Railway			1906	1913	Atlantic Northern Railway, Atlantic Southern Railway	
Atlantic Southern Railroad		RI	1879	1880	Chicago, Rock Island and Pacific Railway	
Atlantic Southern Railway			1913	1915	N/A	
Avoca, Harlan and Northern Railroad		RI	1878	1899	Chicago, Rock Island and Pacific Railway	
Avoca, Macedonia and South Western Railroad		RI	1879	1880	Chicago, Rock Island and Pacific Railway	
Bellevue and Cascade Railroad			1933	1936	N/A	
Boone County Railway		CNW	1899	1900	Chicago and North Western Railway	
Boone Valley Coal and Railway Company		CNW	1893	1899	Marshalltown and Dakota Railway	
Boyer Valley Railway		CNW	1898	1900	Chicago and North Western Railway	
Brownville and Nodaway Valley Railway		CB&Q	1872	1901	Chicago, Burlington and Quincy Railroad	
Burlington, Cedar Rapids and Minnesota Railway		RI	1868	1878	Burlington, Cedar Rapids and Northern Railway	
Burlington, Cedar Rapids and Northern Railway		RI	1876	1903	Chicago, Rock Island and Pacific Railway	
Burlington, Fort Madison and Southwestern Railway		CB&Q	1870	1871	Burlington and Southwestern Railway	
Burlington and Missouri Railroad		CB&Q	1871	1901	Chicago, Burlington and Quincy Railroad	
Burlington and Missouri River Railroad		CB&Q	1852	1875	Chicago, Burlington and Quincy Railroad	
Burlington and Missouri River Railroad in Nebraska		CB&Q	1869	1880	Chicago, Burlington and Quincy Railroad	
Burlington, Muscatine and Northwestern Railway		RI	1925	1952	Chicago, Rock Island and Pacific Railroad	
Burlington Northern Inc.	BN		1970	1981	Burlington Northern Railroad	
Burlington Northern Railroad	BN		1981	1996	Burlington Northern and Santa Fe Railway	
Burlington and Northwestern Railway		CB&Q	1876	1902	Burlington and Western Railway	
Burlington and Northwestern Narrow Gauge Railway		CB&Q	1875	1876	Burlington and Northwestern Railway	
Burlington and Southwestern Railway		CB&Q	1871	1880	Chicago, Burlington and Kansas City Railway	
Burlington and Southwestern Railway		CB&Q	1869	1870	Burlington, Fort Madison and Southwestern Railway	
Burlington and Western Railway		CB&Q	1881	1903	Chicago, Burlington and Quincy Railroad	
Cedar Falls and Minnesota Railroad		IC	1858	1896	Dubuque and Sioux City Railroad	
Cedar Falls and New Hartford Railroad		IC	1903	1904	Dubuque and Sioux City Railroad	
Cedar Falls and North Eastern Railroad		IC	1904	1905	Dubuque and Sioux City Railroad	
Cedar Rapids and Burlington Railroad		RI	1867	1868	Burlington, Cedar Rapids and Minnesota Railway	
Cedar Rapids and Chicago Railroad		IC	1886	1888	Dubuque and Sioux City Railroad	
Cedar Rapids and Clinton Railway		RI	1882	1902	Burlington, Cedar Rapids and Northern Railway	
Cedar Rapids, Garner and Northwestern Railway		RI	1898	1900	Burlington, Cedar Rapids and Northern Railway	
Cedar Rapids, Iowa Falls and Northwestern Railway		RI	1880	1902	Burlington, Cedar Rapids and Northern Railway	
Cedar Rapids and Missouri River Railroad		CNW	1860	1884	Chicago and North Western Railway	
Cedar Rapids and St. Louis Railroad		MILW	1871	1881	Chicago, Milwaukee and St. Paul Railway	
Cedar Rapids and St. Paul Railway		RI	1865	1868	Burlington, Cedar Rapids and Minnesota Railway	
Cedar Valley Railroad	CVAR		1984	1991	Cedar River Railroad	
Centerville, Albia and Southern Railway			1914	1916	Iowa Southern Utilities Company	
Centerville, Moravia and Albia Railroad		MSTL	1879	1890	Albia and Centerville Railway	
Central Railroad of Iowa		MSTL	1869	1877	Central Iowa Railway	
Central Iowa Railway	CIRC		1974	1974	N/A	
Central Iowa Railway		MSTL	1878	1888	Iowa Railway	
Chariton, Des Moines and Southern Railroad		CB&Q	1876	1901	Chicago, Burlington and Quincy Railroad	
Charles City Railway Line, Inc.	CCRY		1987	1994	N/A	
Charles City Western Railway			1910	1964	Iowa Terminal Railroad	
Cherokee and Dakota Railroad		IC	1887	1888	Dubuque and Sioux City Railroad	
Chicago, Anamosa and Northern Railway			1903	1916	N/A	
Chicago, Bellevue, Cascade and Western Railway		MILW	1878	1880	Chicago, Clinton, Dubuque and Minnesota Railroad	
Chicago, Burlington and Kansas City Railway		CB&Q	1880	1901	Chicago, Burlington and Quincy Railroad	
Chicago, Burlington and Northern Railroad		CB&Q	1885	1899	Chicago, Burlington and Quincy Railroad	
Chicago, Burlington and Quincy Railroad	CB&Q	CB&Q	1868	1970	Burlington Northern Inc.	
Chicago, Burlington and Quincy Railway		CB&Q	1901	1907	N/A	Leased the Chicago, Burlington and Quincy Railroad
Chicago, Burlington and Pacific Railroad		MSTL	1882	1882	Central Iowa Railway	
Chicago, Clinton and Dubuque Railroad		MILW	1871	1877	Clinton and Dubuque Railroad	
Chicago, Clinton, Dubuque and Minnesota Railroad		MILW	1878	1880	Chicago, Milwaukee and St. Paul Railway	
Chicago, Clinton and Western Railroad		RI	1877	1878	Burlington, Cedar Rapids and Northern Railway	
Chicago, Decorah and Minnesota Railway		RI	1881	1902	Burlington, Cedar Rapids and Northern Railway	
Chicago, Dubuque and Minnesota Railroad		MILW	1871	1877	Dubuque and Minnesota Railroad	
Chicago, Fort Madison and Des Moines Railroad		CB&Q	1899	1901	Chicago, Burlington and Quincy Railroad	
Chicago, Fort Madison and Des Moines Railway		CB&Q	1890	1899	Chicago, Fort Madison and Des Moines Railroad	
Chicago Great Western Railroad	CGW	CGW	1909	1941	Chicago Great Western Railway	
Chicago Great Western Railway	CGW	CGW	1940	1968	Chicago and North Western Railway	
Chicago Great Western Railway		CGW	1892	1909	Chicago Great Western Railroad	
Chicago, Iowa and Dakota Railway		CNW	1882	1903	Chicago and North Western Railway	
Chicago, Iowa and Kansas Railway		RI	1876	1877	Chicago, Clinton and Western Railroad	
Chicago, Iowa and Minnesota Railway		CNW	1895	1901	Chicago and North Western Railway	
Chicago, Iowa and Nebraska Railroad		CNW	1856	1884	Chicago and North Western Railway	
Chicago, Iowa and Northern Pacific Railroad		RI	1885	1888	Davenport, Iowa and Dakota Railroad	
Chicago and Iowa Western Railway		RI	1891	1894	Cedar Rapids, Iowa Falls and Northwestern Railway	
Chicago, Milwaukee and St. Paul Railway		MILW	1874	1928	Chicago, Milwaukee, St. Paul and Pacific Railroad	
Chicago, Milwaukee, St. Paul and Pacific Railroad	MILW	MILW	1928	1985	The Milwaukee Road, Inc.	
Chicago and North Western Railway	CNW	CNW	1864	1972	Chicago and North Western Transportation Company	
Chicago and North Western Transportation Company	CNW	CNW	1972	1995	Union Pacific Railroad	
Chicago, Omaha and St. Joseph Railroad		RI	1872	1882	Cedar Rapids and Clinton Railway	
Chicago, Rock Island and Pacific Railroad	RI, ROCK	RI	1947	1980	Burlington Northern Inc., Cedar Rapids and Iowa City Railway, Chicago, Milwaukee, St. Paul and Pacific Railroad, Chicago and North Western Railway, Iowa Railroad, Iowa Northern Railway, Keokuk Junction Railway, Kewash Railroad	
Chicago, Rock Island and Pacific Railroad		RI	1902	1916	Chicago, Rock Island and Pacific Railway	
Chicago, Rock Island and Pacific Railroad		RI	1866	1880	Chicago, Rock Island and Pacific Railway	
Chicago, Rock Island and Pacific Railway	RI	RI	1880	1948	Chicago, Rock Island and Pacific Railroad	
Chicago, St. Paul and Kansas City Railway		CGW	1886	1893	Chicago Great Western Railway	
Chicago, St. Paul, Minneapolis and Omaha Railway	CMO	CNW	1881	1972	Chicago and North Western Transportation Company	
Chicago, Santa Fe and California Railway		ATSF	1887	1900	Atchison, Topeka and Santa Fe Railway	
Chicago, Santa Fe and California Railway of Iowa		ATSF	1886	1887	Chicago, Santa Fe and California Railway	
Chicago and South Western Railway		RI	1869	1876	Iowa Southern and Missouri Northern Railroad	
Chillicothe and Chariton Railroad		CB&Q	1878	1901	Chicago, Burlington and Quincy Railroad	
Clarinda, College Springs and South Western Railroad		CB&Q	1878	1901	Chicago, Burlington and Quincy Railroad	
Clinton and Dubuque Railroad		MILW	1877	1878	Chicago, Clinton, Dubuque and Minnesota Railroad	
Colfax Northern Railroad			1901	1912	Colfax Northern Railway	
Colfax Northern Railway			1912	1926	N/A	
Council Bluffs Railway	CBGR		1991	2006	Iowa Interstate Railroad	
Council Bluffs and Ottumwa Railway	CBOA		1989	1991	Council Bluffs Railway	
Council Bluffs and St. Joseph Railroad		CB&Q	1858	1869	St. Joseph and Council Bluffs Railroad	
Council Bluffs and St. Louis Railway		WAB	1878	1886	Omaha and St. Louis Railway	
Creston Branch of the Burlington and Missouri River Railroad		CB&Q	1871	1901	Chicago, Burlington and Quincy Railroad	
Creston and Northern Railroad		CB&Q	1878	1901	Chicago, Burlington and Quincy Railroad	
Creston, Winterset and Des Moines Railroad			1911	1918	N/A	
Crooked Creek Railroad and Coal Company		CNW	1875	1916	Fort Dodge, Des Moines and Southern Railroad	
Davenport, Clinton and Eastern Railway		CB&Q/ MILW	1895	1901	Davenport, Rock Island and North Western Railway	
Davenport, Iowa and Dakota Railroad		RI	1882	1892	Burlington, Cedar Rapids and Northern Railway	
Davenport and North Western Railway		MILW	1876	1879	Chicago, Milwaukee and St. Paul Railway	
Davenport and Rock Island Railway Bridge Company		CB&Q/ MILW	1884	1895	Davenport and Rock Island Bridge, Railway and Terminal Company	
Davenport and Rock Island Bridge, Railway and Terminal Company		CB&Q/ MILW	1895	1898	Davenport, Rock Island and North Western Railway	
Davenport, Rock Island and North Western Railway	DRI	CB&Q/ MILW	1898	1995	Soo Line Railroad	
Davenport and St. Paul Railroad		MILW	1868	1876	Davenport and North Western Railway	
Des Moines, Adel and Western Railroad		MILW	1875	1880	Des Moines North Western Railway	
Des Moines and Central Iowa Railroad	D&CI, DCI	CNW	1922	1949	Des Moines and Central Iowa Railway	Electric until 1949
Des Moines and Central Iowa Railway	DCI	CNW	1949	1983	Chicago and North Western Transportation Company	
Des Moines and Fort Dodge Railroad		MSTL	1874	1915	Minneapolis and St. Louis Railroad	
Des Moines, Indianola and Missouri Railroad		RI	1870	1876	Iowa Southern and Missouri Northern Railroad	
Des Moines, Iowa Falls and Northern Railway		RI	1899	1908	St. Paul and Des Moines Railroad	
Des Moines and Kansas City Railway		CB&Q	1888	1898	Keokuk and Western Railroad	
Des Moines and Knoxville Railway		CB&Q	1878	1901	Chicago, Burlington and Quincy Railroad	
Des Moines and Minneapolis Railroad		CNW	1877	1884	Chicago and North Western Railway	
Des Moines and Minnesota Railroad		CNW	1870	1877	Des Moines and Minneapolis Railroad	
Des Moines and Northern Railway		MILW	1889	1891	Des Moines, Northern and Western Railway	
Des Moines, Northern and Western Railroad		MILW	1895	1899	Chicago, Milwaukee and St. Paul Railway	
Des Moines, Northern and Western Railway		MILW	1891	1895	Des Moines, Northern and Western Railroad	
Des Moines North Western Railway		MILW	1880	1888	Des Moines and Northwestern Railway	
Des Moines and Northwestern Railway		MILW	1887	1891	Des Moines, Northern and Western Railway	
Des Moines, Osceola and Southern Railroad		CB&Q	1879	1887	Des Moines and Kansas City Railway	
Des Moines and St. Louis Railroad		WAB	1881	1899	Wabash Railroad	
Des Moines Southern Railway		RI	1901	1903	Chicago, Rock Island and Pacific Railroad	
Des Moines Terminal Company			1902			
Des Moines Union Railway	DMU		1884	1989	Norfolk and Western Railway	
Des Moines Valley Railroad		MSTL, RI	1864	1873	Des Moines and Fort Dodge Railroad, Keokuk and Des Moines Railway	
Des Moines Western Railway		CNW		1974	Chicago and North Western Transportation Company	
Des Moines Western Railway		MILW	1871	1874	Des Moines, Adel and Western Railroad	
Des Moines, Winterset and South Western Railroad		RI	1871	1879	Iowa Southern and Missouri Northern Railroad	
Dubuque, Bellevue and Mississippi Railway		MILW	1870	1871	Chicago, Clinton and Dubuque Railroad	
Dubuque and Dakota Railroad		CGW	1878	1887	Minnesota and Northwestern Railroad	
Dubuque and MacGregor Railway		MILW	1868	1869	Dubuque and Minnesota Railway	
Dubuque, Marion and Western Railroad		MILW	1860	1863	Dubuque South Western Railroad	
Dubuque and Minnesota Railroad		MILW	1877	1878	Chicago, Clinton, Dubuque and Minnesota Railroad	
Dubuque and Minnesota Railway		MILW	1869	1871	Chicago, Dubuque and Minnesota Railroad	
Dubuque and Northwestern Railway		CGW	1883	1886	Minnesota and Northwestern Railroad	
Dubuque and Pacific Railroad		IC	1853	1860	Dubuque and Sioux City Railroad	
Dubuque and Sioux City Railroad		IC	1860	1946	Illinois Central Railroad	
Dubuque South Western Railroad		MILW	1863	1881	Chicago, Milwaukee and St. Paul Railway	
Dubuque Western Railroad		MILW	1855	1861	Dubuque, Marion and Western Railroad	
Dunleith and Dubuque Bridge Company		IC	1867	1946	Illinois Central Railroad	
Eldora Railroad and Coal Company		MSTL	1866	1868	Iowa River Railway	
Fairfield and Ottumwa Railroad		CB&Q	1900	1901	Chicago, Burlington and Quincy Railroad	
Farmers Union Railroad			1875	1875	N/A	
Forest City Southern Railway		CNW	1881	1882	Chicago, Iowa and Dakota Railway	
Fort Dodge, Des Moines and Southern Railroad		CNW	1906	1942	Fort Dodge, Des Moines and Southern Railway	
Fort Dodge, Des Moines and Southern Railway	FDDM	CNW	1942	1983	Chicago and North Western Transportation Company	Electric until 1955
Fort Dodge and Fort Ridgeley Railroad		MSTL	1878	1881	Minneapolis and St. Louis Railway	
Fort Dodge and Fort Ridgeley Railroad and Telegraph Company		MSTL	1876	1878	Fort Dodge and Fort Ridgeley Railroad	
Fort Dodge and Omaha Railroad		IC	1898	1900	Dubuque and Sioux City Railroad	
Fort Madison, Farmington and Western Railroad		CB&Q	1869	1870	Burlington, Fort Madison and Southwestern Railway	
Fort Madison and Keokuk Railway and Transportation Company		CB&Q	1862	1867	Keokuk and St. Paul Railway	
Fort Madison and Northwestern Railway		CB&Q	1872	1890	Chicago, Fort Madison and Des Moines Railway	
Fort Madison, Oskaloosa and Northwestern Railway		CB&Q	1872	1872	Fort Madison and Northwestern Railway	
Fort Madison, West Point, Keosauqua and Bloomfield Railroad		CB&Q	1853	1857	Iowa Southern Railroad	
Galena and Chicago Union Railroad		CNW	1862	1864	Chicago and North Western Railway	
Gowrie and Northwestern Railway		RI	1899	1900	Chicago, Rock Island and Pacific Railway	
Great Northern Railway	GN	GN	1907	1970	Burlington Northern Inc.	
Grinnell and Montezuma Railroad		MSTL	1875	1882	Keithsburg, Grinnell and Dakota Railway	
Guthrie and Northwestern Railroad		RI	1879	1890	Chicago, Rock Island and Pacific Railway	
Harlan and Kirkman Railway		CNW	1899	1900	Chicago and North Western Railway	
Hastings and Avoca Railroad		CB&Q	1870	1901	Chicago, Burlington and Quincy Railroad	
Humeston and Shenandoah Railroad		CB&Q	1881	1896	Humeston and Shenandoah Railway	
Humeston and Shenandoah Railway		CB&Q	1896	1901	Chicago, Burlington and Quincy Railroad	
Illinois Central Railroad	IC	IC	1867	1972	Illinois Central Gulf Railroad	
Illinois Central Gulf Railroad	ICG		1972	1985	Chicago Central and Pacific Railroad	
I&M Rail Link	IMRL		1997	2002	Iowa, Chicago and Eastern Railroad	
Iowa Railroad	IRRC		1981	1987	N/A	
Iowa Railway		MSTL	1888	1888	Iowa Central Railway	
Iowa Railway, Coal and Manufacturing Company		CNW	1873	1887	Chicago and North Western Railway	
Iowa Central Railway		MSTL	1888	1912	Minneapolis and St. Louis Railroad	
Iowa Central Air Line Railroad		CNW	1853	1864	Mississippi, Maquoketa and Northwestern Railroad	
Iowa Central and Northwestern Railway		MSTL	1880	1882	Central Iowa Railway	
Iowa Central and Western Railway		MSTL	1898	1916	Minneapolis and St. Louis Railroad	
Iowa, Chicago and Eastern Railroad	ICE		2002	2008	Dakota, Minnesota and Eastern Railroad	
Iowa City and Western Railway		RI	1878	1902	Burlington, Cedar Rapids and Northern Railway	
Iowa Eastern Railroad		MILW	1872	1880	Chicago, Milwaukee and St. Paul Railway	
Iowa Falls and Sioux City Railroad		IC	1867	1888	Dubuque and Sioux City Railroad	
Iowa and Great Northern Railway		GN	1905	1910	Great Northern Railway	
Iowa Midland Railway		CNW	1870	1884	Chicago and North Western Railway	
Iowa and Minnesota Railroad		RI	1870	1883	Cedar Rapids, Iowa Falls and Northwestern Railway	
Iowa and Minnesota Railway		CNW	1866	1870	Des Moines and Minnesota Railroad	
Iowa, Minnesota and North Pacific Railway		RI	1871	1877	Newton and Monroe Railroad	
Iowa, Minnesota and Northwestern Railway		CNW	1898	1900	Chicago and North Western Railway	
Iowa and Missouri State Line Railroad		CB&Q	1859	1870	Burlington and Southwestern Railway	
Iowa Northern Railway			1882	1901	Colfax Northern Railroad	
Iowa Northern Central Railroad		CB&Q	1867	1870	Keokuk, Iowa City and Minnesota Railroad	
Iowa and Omaha Short Line Railway			1908	1916	N/A	
Iowa Pacific Railroad		CGW	1870	1879	Dubuque and Dakota Railroad, Mason City and Fort Dodge Railroad	
Iowa River Railway		MSTL	1868	1869	Central Railroad of Iowa	
Iowa and St. Louis Railway		CB&Q	1901	1903	Chicago, Burlington and Quincy Railroad	
Iowa Southern Railroad	ISR		1984	1989	Council Bluffs and Ottumwa Railway	
Iowa Southern Railroad		CB&Q	1857	1862	Fort Madison and Keokuk Railway and Transportation Company	
Iowa Southern Railway		CNW	1913	1920	Chicago and North Western Railway	
Iowa Southern Railway		CB&Q	1868	1870	Missouri, Iowa and Nebraska Railway	
Iowa Southern Junction Railroad		CB&Q	1858	1859	Iowa Southern Railroad	
Iowa Southern and Missouri Northern Railroad		RI	1876	1880	Chicago, Rock Island and Pacific Railway	
Iowa Southern Utilities Company	ISN, ISU		1916	1941	Southern Iowa Railway	
Iowa Southwestern Railroad		RI	1870	1872	Chicago, Omaha and St. Joseph Railroad	
Iowa and Southwestern Railway				1916	N/A	
Iowa South Western Railway		CNW	1880	1884	Chicago and North Western Railway	
Iowa Terminal Railroad	IAT		1961	1987	Charles City Railway Line, Inc., Iowa Traction Railroad	
Iowa Transfer Railway		CB&Q/ CGW/ RI	1906			
Kansas City, St. Joseph and Council Bluffs Railroad		CB&Q	1870	1901	Chicago, Burlington and Quincy Railroad	
Keithsburg Bridge Company		MSTL	1881	1901	Iowa Central Railway	
Keithsburg, Grinnell and Dakota Railway		MSTL	1882	1882	Central Iowa Railway	
Keokuk Railway and Improvement Company		CB&Q	1891	1900	St. Louis, Keokuk and Northwestern Railroad	
Keokuk and Des Moines Railway		RI	1874	1924	St. Paul and Kansas City Short Line Railroad	
Keokuk, Fort Des Moines and Minnesota Railroad		MSTL, RI	1853	1864	Des Moines Valley Railroad	
Keokuk and Hamilton Bridge Company		TP&W	1868			
Keokuk and Hamilton Mississippi Bridge Company			1866	1868	Keokuk and Hamilton Bridge Company	
Keokuk, Iowa City and Minnesota Railroad		CB&Q	1870	1874	Burlington and Northwestern Railway, Keokuk and North Western Railroad	
Keokuk and Minnesota Railway		CB&Q	1869	1870	Keokuk, Iowa City and Minnesota Railroad	
Keokuk, Mount Pleasant and Muscatine Railroad		CB&Q	1855	1866	Keokuk and St. Paul Railway	
Keokuk, Mount Pleasant and Northern Railroad		CB&Q	1879	1881	Keokuk and Northwestern Railroad	
Keokuk and Northwestern Railroad		CB&Q	1881	1889	Mount Pleasant and Keokuk Railroad	
Keokuk and North Western Railroad		CB&Q	1876	1881	Keokuk and Northwestern Railroad	
Keokuk and St. Paul Railway		CB&Q	1867	1901	Chicago, Burlington and Quincy Railroad	
Keokuk Union Depot Company		CB&Q/ RI/ TP&W/ WAB	1890			Still exists as a subsidiary of the Keokuk Junction Railway
Keokuk and Western Railroad		CB&Q	1886	1901	Chicago, Burlington and Quincy Railroad	
Keosauqua and Southwestern Railroad		RI	1880	1890	Chicago, Rock Island and Pacific Railway	
Kewash Railroad	KWTR		1983	1988	N/A	
Leon, Mount Ayr and Southwestern Railroad		CB&Q	1878	1901	Chicago, Burlington and Quincy Railroad	
Linn County Railway		CNW	1886	1887	Chicago and North Western Railway	
Manchester and Oneida Railway			1900	1951	N/A	
Maple River Railroad		CNW	1876	1884	Chicago and North Western Railway	
Maple Valley Railway		CNW	1886	1887	Chicago and North Western Railway	
Maquoketa, Hurstville and Dubuque Railroad		MILW	1888	1903	Chicago, Milwaukee and St. Paul Railway	
Marshalltown and Dakota Railway		CNW	1895	1903	Newton and Northwestern Railroad	
Mason City and Fort Dodge Railroad		CGW	1881	1940	Chicago Great Western Railroad	
Mason City and Fort Dodge Railway		CGW	1902	1905	Mason City and Fort Dodge Railroad	
Mason City and Minnesota Railway		MILW	1870	1871	Milwaukee and St. Paul Railway	
McGregor and Missouri River Railway		MILW	1869	1880	Chicago, Milwaukee and St. Paul Railway, Milwaukee and St. Paul Railway	
McGregor and Sioux City Railway		MILW	1868	1869	McGregor and Missouri River Railway, Milwaukee and St. Paul Railway	
McGregor Western Railway		MILW	1863	1867	Milwaukee and St. Paul Railway	
Milwaukee, Chicago, Cassville and Montana Railroad		MILW	1871	1872	Iowa Eastern Railroad	
Milwaukee and Prairie du Chien Railway		MILW	1865	1867	Milwaukee and St. Paul Railway	
The Milwaukee Road, Inc.	MILW	MILW	1985	1986	Soo Line Railroad	
Milwaukee and St. Paul Railway		MILW	1867	1874	Chicago, Milwaukee and St. Paul Railway	
Minneapolis and St. Louis Railroad		MSTL	1895	1944	Minneapolis and St. Louis Railway	
Minneapolis and St. Louis Railroad and Telegraph Company of Iowa		MSTL	1895	1895	Minneapolis and St. Louis Railroad	
Minneapolis and St. Louis Railway	MSTL	MSTL	1939	1960	Chicago and North Western Railway	
Minneapolis and St. Louis Railway		MSTL	1881	1894	Minneapolis and St. Louis Railroad and Telegraph Company of Iowa	
Minnesota and Iowa Railway		CNW	1898	1900	Chicago and North Western Railway	
Minnesota and Iowa Southern Railway		MSTL	1878	1881	Minneapolis and St. Louis Railway	
Minnesota and Northwestern Railroad		CGW	1886	1887	Chicago, St. Paul and Kansas City Railway	
Mississippi, Maquoketa and Northwestern Railroad		CNW	1868	1871	Iowa Midland Railway	
Mississippi and Missouri Railroad		RI	1853	1866	Chicago, Rock Island and Pacific Railroad	
Mississippi River Railroad and Toll Bridge Company		ATSF	1886	1900	Atchison, Topeka and Santa Fe Railway	
Mississippi Valley and Western Railway		CB&Q	1871	1875	St. Louis, Keokuk and North Western Railway	
Missouri, Iowa and Nebraska Railway		CB&Q	1870	1886	Keokuk and Western Railroad	
Missouri Valley and Blair Railway and Bridge Company		CNW	1882	1920	Chicago and North Western Railway	
Moulton, Albia and Des Moines Railroad		WAB	1899	1899	Wabash Railroad	
Mount Pleasant and Keokuk Railroad		CB&Q	1889	1889	St. Louis, Keokuk and Northwestern Railroad	
Moville Extension Railway		CNW	1901	1901	Sioux City and Pacific Railroad	
Murray and Creston Railroad		CB&Q	1900	1901	Chicago, Burlington and Quincy Railroad	
Muscatine, Burlington and Southern Railroad		RI	1916	1925	Burlington, Muscatine and Northwestern Railway	
Muscatine and Iowa City Railway		RI	1915	1916	N/A	Leased several lines from the Chicago, Rock Island and Pacific Railway
Muscatine North and South Railroad		RI	1893	1905	Muscatine North and South Railway	
Muscatine North and South Railway		RI	1905	1916	Muscatine, Burlington and Southern Railroad	
Muscatine Western Railroad		RI	1870	1872	Burlington, Cedar Rapids and Minnesota Railway	
Nebraska Railway		CB&Q	1875	1908	Chicago, Burlington and Quincy Railroad	
Nebraska City, Sidney and North Eastern Railway		CB&Q	1878	1901	Chicago, Burlington and Quincy Railroad	
New Sharon, Coal Valley and Eastern Railroad		MSTL	1880	1882	Chicago, Burlington and Pacific Railroad	
Newton and Monroe Railroad		RI	1877	1880	Chicago, Rock Island and Pacific Railway	
Newton and Northwestern Railroad		CNW	1902	1909	Fort Dodge, Des Moines and Southern Railroad	
Norfolk and Western Railway	N&W, NW		1964	1998	Norfolk Southern Railway	
Omaha Bridge and Terminal Railway Company		IC	1893	1946	Illinois Central Railroad	
Omaha and St. Louis Railroad		WAB	1896	1901	Wabash Railroad	
Omaha and St. Louis Railway		WAB	1887	1896	Omaha and St. Louis Railroad	
Ottumwa, Cedar Falls and St. Paul Railway		CNW	1883	1884	Chicago and North Western Railway	
Ottumwa Terminal Railroad				1989	Council Bluffs and Ottumwa Railway	
Red Oak and Atlantic Railroad		CB&Q	1870	1901	Chicago, Burlington and Quincy Railroad	
Sabula, Ackley and Dakota Railroad		MILW	1870	1872	Milwaukee and St. Paul Railway	
Sac City and Wall Lake Railroad		CNW	1877	1878	Maple River Railroad	
St. Joseph and Council Bluffs Railroad		CB&Q	1869	1870	Kansas City, St. Joseph and Council Bluffs Railroad	
St. Louis and Cedar Rapids Railway		WAB	1865	1873	St. Louis, Ottumwa and Cedar Rapids Railway	
St. Louis, Des Moines and Northern Railway		MILW	1881	1889	Des Moines and Northern Railway	
St. Louis, Keokuk and Northwestern Railroad		CB&Q	1887	1901	Chicago, Burlington and Quincy Railroad	
St. Louis, Keokuk and North Western Railway		CB&Q	1875	1887	St. Louis, Keokuk and Northwestern Railroad	
St. Louis, Keosauqua and St. Paul Railroad		RI	1873	1875	Keosauqua and Southwestern Railroad	
St. Louis, Ottumwa and Cedar Rapids Railway		WAB	1875	1887	Wabash Western Railway	
St. Paul and Des Moines Railroad		RI	1905	1911	St. Paul and Kansas City Short Line Railroad	
St. Paul and Kansas City Short Line Railroad		RI	1911	1948	Chicago, Rock Island and Pacific Railroad	
St. Paul and Sioux City Railroad		CNW	1879	1881	Chicago, St. Paul, Minneapolis and Omaha Railway	
Sioux City Bridge Company		CNW	1872	1956	Chicago and North Western Railway	
Sioux City and Dakota Railroad		MILW	1879	1881	Chicago, Milwaukee and St. Paul Railway	
Sioux City, Dakota and North Western Railway		CNW	1909	1910	Chicago and North Western Railway	
Sioux City and Northern Railroad		GN	1887	1900	Willmar and Sioux Falls Railway	
Sioux City and Pacific Railroad		CNW	1864	1901	Chicago and North Western Railway	
Sioux City and Pembina Railway		MILW	1870	1879	Sioux City and Dakota Railroad	
Sioux City and St. Paul Railroad		CNW	1866	1879	St. Paul and Sioux City Railroad	
Sioux City Terminal Railroad and Warehouse Company		GN	1889	1900	Union Terminal Railway	
Sioux City Terminal Railway	SCT		1907	1972	N/A	
Sioux Valley Railway		CNW	1887	1887	Chicago and North Western Railway	
Soo Line Railroad	SOO	CP	1986	1997	I&M Rail Link	
Southern Industrial Railroad	SIRR		1964	1967	N/A	
Southern Iowa Railway			1941	1965	Southern Industrial Railroad	
Southern Iowa Railway		CNW	1900	1901	Chicago and North Western Railway	
Southern Iowa Traction Company			1910	1914	Centerville, Albia and Southern Railway	
Stacyville Railroad		IC	1897	1903	Dubuque and Sioux City Railroad	
Stanwood and Tipton Railway		CNW	1872	1884	Chicago and North Western Railway	
Tabor and Northern Railway			1887	1934	N/A	
Tama and Toledo Railroad		CNW		1953	Chicago and North Western Railway	Electric until 1925
Tarkio Valley Railroad		CB&Q	1880	1900	Kansas City, St. Joseph and Council Bluffs Railroad	
Toledo and Northwestern Railway		CNW	1869	1890	Chicago and North Western Railway	
Toledo, Peoria and Warsaw Railway		TP&W	1869	1880	Toledo, Peoria and Western Railroad	
Toledo, Peoria and Western Railroad	TP&W, TPW	TP&W	1926	1983	Atchison, Topeka and Santa Fe Railway	
Toledo, Peoria and Western Railroad		TP&W	1879	1886	Toledo, Peoria and Western Railway	
Toledo, Peoria and Western Railway	TPW		1989	2001	Keokuk Junction Railway	
Toledo, Peoria and Western Railway	TP&W	TP&W	1887	1927	Toledo, Peoria and Western Railroad	
Union Pacific Railroad		UP	1862	1880	Union Pacific Railway	
Union Pacific Railway		UP	1880	1898	Union Pacific Railroad	
Union Terminal Railway		GN	1900	1910	Great Northern Railway	
Wabash Railroad	WAB	WAB	1937	1991	Norfolk and Western Railway	
Wabash Railroad		WAB	1889	1915	Wabash Railway	
Wabash Railway		WAB	1915	1941	Wabash Railroad	
Wabash Western Railway		WAB	1887	1889	Wabash Railroad	
Waterloo Railroad	WLO	IC/ RI	1955			
Waterloo, Cedar Falls and Northern Railroad		IC/ RI	1944	1956	Waterloo Railroad	
Waterloo, Cedar Falls and Northern Railway		IC/ RI	1904	1944	Waterloo, Cedar Falls and Northern Railroad	Electric 1912-1947
Waukon and Mississippi Railroad		MILW	1875	1880	Chicago, Clinton, Dubuque and Minnesota Railroad	
Waverly Short Line		RI	1885	1902	Burlington, Cedar Rapids and Northern Railway	
Webster City and Southwestern Railroad		CNW	1883	1890	Crooked Creek Railroad and Coal Company	
Western Iowa Railroad		CB&Q	1884	1901	Chicago, Burlington and Quincy Railroad	
Willmar and Sioux Falls Railway		GN	1900	1907	Great Northern Railway	
Winona, Osage and Southwestern Railway		CGW	1891	1891	Winona and Southwestern Railway	
Winona and Southwestern Railway		CGW	1888	1894	Winona and Western Railway	
Winona and Western Railway		CGW	1894	1901	Wisconsin, Minnesota and Pacific Railroad	
Wisconsin, Iowa and Nebraska Railway		CGW	1882	1886	Chicago, St. Paul and Kansas City Railway	
Wisconsin, Minnesota and Pacific Railroad		CGW	1901	1920	Chicago Great Western Railroad	
Worthington and Sioux Falls Railroad		CNW	1879	1879	St. Paul and Sioux City Railroad	

Electric

- Albia Interurban Railway
- Albia Light and Railway Company
- Burlington Electric Railway
- Burlington Railway and Light Company
- Cedar Falls and Normal Railway
- Cedar Rapids and Iowa City Railway and Light Company
- Cedar Rapids and Marion City Railway
- Centerville Light and Traction Company
- Charles City Western Railway
- Citizens' Railway and Light Company
- Clinton, Davenport and Muscatine Railway
- Clinton Street Railway
- Clinton and Lyons Horse Railway
- Colfax Springs Railway
- Davenport and Muscatine Railway
- Des Moines City Railway
- Des Moines Street Railroad
- Des Moines Suburban Railway
- Dubuque Street Railway
- Fort Dodge, Des Moines and Southern Railroad
- Fort Dodge Street Railway
- Fort Madison Street Railway
- Inter-Urban Railway (ITU)
- Iowa Railway and Light Company
- Iowa City Electric Company
- Iowa and Illinois Railway
- Iowa Southern Utilities Company
- Keokuk Electric Company
- Keokuk Electric Railway and Power Company
- Lake Manawa and Manhattan Beach Railway
- Marshalltown Light, Power and Railway Company
- Mason City and Clear Lake Railroad
- Mississippi Valley Electric Company
- Newton and Northwestern Railroad
- Omaha and Council Bluffs Railway and Bridge Company
- Omaha and Council Bluffs Street Railway
- Omaha, Council Bluffs and Suburban Railway
- Oskaloosa and Buxton Electric Railway
- Oskaloosa Traction and Light Company
- Ottumwa Railway and Light Company
- Ottumwa Traction and Light Company
- Sioux City, Crystal Lake and Homer Electric Railway
- Sioux City, Homer and Southern Railway
- Sioux City Service Company
- Sioux City Traction Company
- Tama and Toledo Railroad
- Tama and Toledo Railway
- Tri-City Railway
- Tri-City Railway and Light Company
- Union Electric Company
- Waterloo, Cedar Falls and Northern Railroad
- Waterloo, Cedar Falls and Northern Railway
- Waterloo and Cedar Falls Rapid Transit Company
- Waterloo Street Railway
