= Union Railroad =

The following railroads have been named Union Railroad or Union Railway, usually because they connected or merged several other railroads.

== Freight carriers ==
- Union Railroad (Pittsburgh), 1889-present
- Union Railroad (Illinois), 1852–1881, an Illinois railroad, predecessor of the Michigan Central Railroad (New York Central system)
- Union Railroad of Baltimore (Maryland), 1866–1976, predecessor of the Pennsylvania Railroad
- Union Railroad (Massachusetts freight railway), 1848–1854, predecessor of the Boston and Albany Railroad (New York Central system)
- Union Freight Railroad, 1872–1970, part of the New York, New Haven and Hartford Railroad system in Boston, Massachusetts
- Union Railroad (Onondaga County, New York), 1856–1858, a New York railroad, predecessor of the Delaware, Lackawanna and Western Railroad
- Union Railroad (Rockland County, New York), 1851–1946, a New York railroad, predecessor of the Erie Railroad
- Union Railroad (Ohio), 1858–1860, an Ohio railroad, predecessor of the Baltimore and Ohio Railroad
- Union Railroad of Oregon, 1927–1993, an Oregon railroad
  - Union Railway (Oregon), 1890–1906, an Oregon railroad, predecessor of the above
- Union Railway (Chattanooga, Tennessee), 1883–1888, a Tennessee railroad, belt line
- Union Railway (Memphis, Tennessee), a Tennessee railroad, belt line

== Street railways ==
- Union Railway (Bronx) in New York City
- Union Railroad (Brooklyn) in New York City
- Union Railroad (Massachusetts street railway) in the Boston area; see North Cambridge Carhouse
- Union Railroad (Missouri), a streetcar in St. Louis
- Union Railway (Missouri) in St. Joseph, a Missouri railroad
- Union Railroad (Rhode Island) in Providence, a Rhode Island railroad
- Union Railroad (Washington), a streetcar in Washington, D.C.

== Other railways ==
The following railroads had Union Railroad or Union Railway in their names:

- Baltimore Coal and Union Railroad, part of the Delaware and Hudson Railroad system
- Chattanooga Union Railway, a Tennessee railroad
- Channel Tunnel Rail Link (High Speed 1), Kent, England
- Dayton and Union Railroad, Union City, Indiana, to Dodson, Ohio, an Ohio railroad
- Dayton Union Railway, Dayton, Ohio, an Ohio railroad
- Delaware River and Union Railroad, Marcus Hook, Pennsylvania, a Pennsylvania railroad
- Des Moines Union Railway, Des Moines, Iowa, an Iowa railroad
- Detroit Union Railroad Depot and Station Company, Detroit, Michigan, a Michigan railroad
- Fort Wayne Union Railway, Fort Wayne, Indiana, an Indiana railroad
- Fremont, Lima and Union Railway, Fremont, Ohio to Rushville, Indiana via Union City, Indiana
- Galena and Chicago Union Railroad, Chicago to Clinton, Iowa
- Indianapolis Union Railway, belt line around Indianapolis, Indiana
- Jacques Cartier Union Railway, a railway in Quebec, Canada
- Kentucky Union Railway, Lexington to Jackson, Kentucky, a Kentucky railroad
- Minneapolis Union Railway, Minneapolis, Minnesota, a Minnesota railroad
- Montana Union Railway, Butte to Garrison, Montana
- Northwestern Union Railroad, Milwaukee to Fond du Lac, Wisconsin; see Chicago and Milwaukee Railway
- Ogden Union Railway and Depot, Ogden, Utah; see Union Station
- Peoria and Pekin Union Railway, Pekin to Peoria, Illinois
- Rock River Valley Union Railroad, state line to Fond du Lac, Wisconsin, a Wisconsin railroad
- Spartanburg and Union Railroad, Alston to Spartanburg, South Carolina
- State Line and Union Railroad, Genoa, Illinois to Columbus, Wisconsin, a Wisconsin railroad
- Troy Union Railroad and Depot, Troy, New York, a New York Central Railroad precursor
- Tulsa-Sapulpa Union Railway, reporting mark: TSU
- Union Pacific Railroad, the largest railroad in the United States
- Union Railroad, Transfer and Stock Yard Company, an Indiana railroad
- Union Railway and Transit Company, St. Louis, Missouri, an Illinois railroad
- Western Union Railroad, Racine, Wisconsin, a Wisconsin railroad
- Wisconsin Union Railroad, Milwaukee, Wisconsin to Illinois state line, a Wisconsin railroad

== See also ==
- Joint railway, a railway operating under the control of more than one railway company
- International Union of Railways
- American Railway Union
- Union Station (disambiguation)
- Etihad Railway, formerly known as United Arab Emirates Union Railway
