= List of reporting marks: T =

Note: Marks ending in U are for container owners; marks ending in X are not common carriers; marks ending in Z are for trailers without flanged wheels. All other marks are of common-carrier railroads.

== T ==
- TACX - Transport Arts Corporation
- TAEA - Tangipahoa and Eastern
- TAG - Tennessee, Alabama and Georgia Railway; Southern Railway; Norfolk Southern Railway
- TANX - Transitank Car Leasing Corporation
- TARX - Sandersville Leasing
- TASD - Terminal Railway Alabama State Docks
- TATX - Tanco Transportation Corporation
- TBCX - The Boeing Company
- TBOX - TTX Company
- TBRY - Thermal Belt Railway
- TBV - Trinity and Brazos Valley Railway
- TC - Tennessee Central Railroad, Temple and Texas Central Railroad
- TCAX - Transportation Corporation of America
- TCB - Texas Central Business Lines
- TCBR - Tecumseh Branch Connecting Railroad
- TCBX - AIG Rail Services - SMBC Rail Services LLC - American Industrial Transport
- TCCX - TCCX Corporation
- TCDX - Tennessee Chemical Company
- TCGB - Tucson, Cornelia and Gila Bend Railroad
- TCGX - Tri-County Gas
- TCIX - Trinity Chemical Leasing
- TCKR - Turtle Creek Industrial Railroad
- TCL - Twin City Lines
- TCLX - Trinity Chemical Leasing
- TCMX - Transportation Company of America
- TCRT - Twin City Rapid Transit Company
- TCRY - Tri-City Railroad
- TCStL - Toledo, Cincinnati and St Louis Railroad
- TCSX - Tank Car Services, Inc.
- TCSZ - Triple Crown Service
- TCT - Texas City Terminal Railway
- TCWR - Twin Cities and Western Railroad
- TCX - General American Transportation Corporation
- TDB - Toledo, Delphos and Burlington Railroad
- TE - Tacoma Eastern Railway
- TECX - Texas Crushed Stone Company
- TECO - Teamo-Tacoma Railroad; Lincoln Pacific Railway
- TEIX - Transportation Equipment, Inc.
- TELX - Penwalt Carriers Corporation; ELF Atochem North America
- TEM - Temiskaming and Northern Ontario
- TEMX - Temple-Eastex
- TENN - Tennessee Railway
- TER - Texas & Eastern Railroad, Texas Electric Railway
- TEXC - Texas Central Railroad
- TFM - Grupo Transportación Ferroviaria Mexicana
- TFS - Texarkana and Fort Smith Railway; Kansas City Southern Railway
- TG - Tonopah and Goldfield Railroad, Tremont and Gulf Railway
- TGAX - Texasgulf
- TGCX - PolyOne Company
- TGIX - Texasgulf; PCS Phosphate Company
- TGOX - US Rail Services
- TGPX - Tamak Transportation Corporation
- TGSX - Texasgulf; Tg Soda Ash
- THB - Toronto, Hamilton and Buffalo Railway; Canadian Pacific Railway
- THR - Thunder Rail
- THRX - Transportation Company of America
- THSX - New York, Susquehanna, & Western Technical and Historical Society
- TI - Turners Island, LLC
- TIBR - Timber Rock Railroad
- TILX - Trinity Industries Leasing
- TIMX - Trinity Industries Leasing
- TIPP - Tippecanoe Railway
- TIRL - Tonawanda Island Railroad
- TJRX - S. M. Brooks Company
- TKCX - Thiele Kaolin Company
- TKEN - Tennken Railroad
- TLCX - Pullman Leasing Company
- TLDX - Pullman Leasing Company; General Electric Rail Services
- TLTX - Tilcon-Tomasso Construction
- TLUX - Trail Life USA
- TM - Texas Midland Railroad, Texas Mexican Railway; Kansas City Southern Railway
- TMAX - Tennessee River Pulp and Paper Company
- TMBL - Tacoma Municipal Belt Line Railway
- TMER&L - The Milwaukee Electric Railway and Light Company
- TMLX - Thunder Mountain Line
- TMO - Vitebsk Seaway and Continental Railway; Lincoln Pacific Railway
- TMPX - Texas Municipal Power Agency
- TMSS - Towanda-Monroeton Shippers Lifeline, Inc.
- TMT - Trailer Marine Transportation Corporation
- TMTC - Tri-County Metropolitan Transit District of Oregon
- TN - Texas and Northern Railway
- TNCX - North American Car Corp.; General Electric Railcar Services Corp.; General Electric Rail Services Corp. (Lessee: Nestlé)
- TNER - Texas Northeastern Railroad
- TNHR - Three Notch Railroad
- TNM - Texas - New Mexico Railway
- TNMR - Texas-New Mexico Railroad; Austin and Northwestern Railroad
- TNO - Texas and New Orleans Railroad; Southern Pacific Railroad; Union Pacific Railroad
- TNSR - Nashtown and Southern Railroad; Lorraine, Eastern and Pacific Railroad;
- TNVR - Tennessee Valley Railroad Museum
- TNW - Toledo and Northwestern Railroad; Chicago and Northwestern Railway
- TOC - Conrail
- TOE - Texas, Oklahoma and Eastern Railroad
- TOV - Tooele Valley Railway
- TP - Texas & Pacific Railway; Missouri Pacific Railroad; Union Pacific Railroad
- TPBX - General American Transportation Corporation
- TPCX - The Purdy Company
- TPFX - General Electric Rail Services
- TPIX - Juice Train
- TPOC - Tulsa Port of Catoosa
- TPPX - Thilmany
- TPRX - Texas Power and Light Company
- TPT - Conrail
- TPTX - Trailer Train Company
- TPW - Toledo, Peoria & Western Railway; Atchison, Topeka & Santa Fe Railway; BNSF
- TQEX - First Union Rail
- TR - Tomahawk Railway
- TRAX - RailTex
- TRBX - Timken Roller Bearing Company
- TRC - Trona Railway
- TRCX - Tri-Rail
- TRE - Trinity Railway Express
- TRGX - Terminal Grain Corporation
- TRIN - Trinidad Railway
- TRIX - Midwest Energy Services Company
- TRLX - Texas Railcar Leasing Company
- TRMW - Tacoma Rail
- TRMX - TRM Industries
- TRNX - General Electric Rail Services
- TRPX - Tropigas
- TRR - Torch River Rail
- TRRA - Terminal Railroad Association of St Louis
- TRRY - Trillium Railway, Port Colborne Harbour Railway
- TRSX - General Electric Rail Services
- TRTX - W. J. Kirberger, Trustee
- TRUX - Midwest Bottle Gas Company
- TRYX - Tri-County Cooperative Association
- TS - Tidewater Southern Railway
- TSBY - Tuscola & Saginaw Bay Railway
- TSE - Texas South-Eastern Railroad
- TSH - Tshiuetin Rail Transportation
- TSO - Tidewater Southern Railway
- TSPX - Texas Sulphur Products Company
- TSR - Texas State Railroad
- TSRD - Twin State Railroad
- TSRR - Tennessee Southern Railroad
- TStLW - Toledo, St Louis & Western Railroad
- TSU - Tulsa-Sapulpa Union Railway
- T&T - Tama and Toledo Railroad
- TT - Toledo Terminal Railroad, Tonopah & Tidewater Railroad
- TTAX - TTX Company
- TTBX - TTX Company
- TTCX - TTX Company
- TTDX - TTX Company
- TTER - Tomiko Tilden & Eastern Railway
- TTEX - TTX Company
- TTFX - TTX Company
- TTGX - TTX Company
- TTHX - TTX Company
- TTIS - Transkentucky Transportation Railroad
- TTIX - TTX Company
- TTJX - TTX Company
- TTKX - TTX Company
- TTLX - TTX Company
- TTMX - TTX Company
- TTNX - TTX Company
- TTOX - TTX Company
- TTPX - TTX Company
- TTQX - TTX Company
- TTR - Tijuana and Tecate Railway; Talleyrand Terminal Railroad
- TTRX - TTX Company
- TTSX - TTX Company
- TTTX - TTX Company
- TTUX - TTX Company
- TTVX - TTX Company
- TTWX - TTX Company
- TTX - TTX Company
- TTXX - TTX Company
- TTYX - TTX Company
- TTZX - TTX Company
- TUGX - Texas Utilities Generating Company
- TUST - Texarkana Union Station Trust
- TVAX - Tennessee Valley Authority
- TVRM - Tennessee Valley Railroad Museum
- TVRR - Tulare Valley Railroad, Tanana Valley Railroad
- TWGX - Tidewater Grain Company
- TWRR - Turlock Western Railroad
- TWRY - Tradewater Railway
- TXIX - Texas Industries
- TXN - Texas & New Mexico Railway
- TXNW - Texas North Western Railway
- TXOR - Texas and Oklahoma Railroad
- TXPF - Texas Pacifico Transportation
- TXR - Texas Rock Crusher Railroad
- TXRC - Texas Export Railroad
- TXTC - Texas Transportation Company
- TXTX - Econo-Rail Corporation
- TYBR - Tyburn Railroad
- TYC - Tylerdale Connecting
- TYNT - Tyner Terminal Railroad
- TZPR - Tazewell & Peoria Railroad
