= URR =

URR or Urr may refer to:

- Urea reduction ratio, used to quantify dialysis treatment adequacy
- Urr Water, a river in Scotland
  - Haugh of Urr, a village by the Urr Water, in the Urr parish
  - Motte of Urr, a "motte-and-bailey" castle near the Haugh of Urr, beside the Urr Water
- Union Railroad is a name, or part of a name, that has been used by many companies, mainly in the US
  - Union Railroad (Pennsylvania) is possibly the only current user of that name
- Underground Railroad, an informal escape network used by 19th-century black slaves in the US
- Unión de Rugby de Rosario, body that rules the game of rugby union in Rosario, Argentina
- Ultima Ratio Regum, a historical roguelike game
