= Ijem Avenue Commercial Historic District =

Historic district in Iowa, United States

- Ijem Avenue Commercial; Historic District
- U.S. National Register of Historic Places
- U.S. Historic district
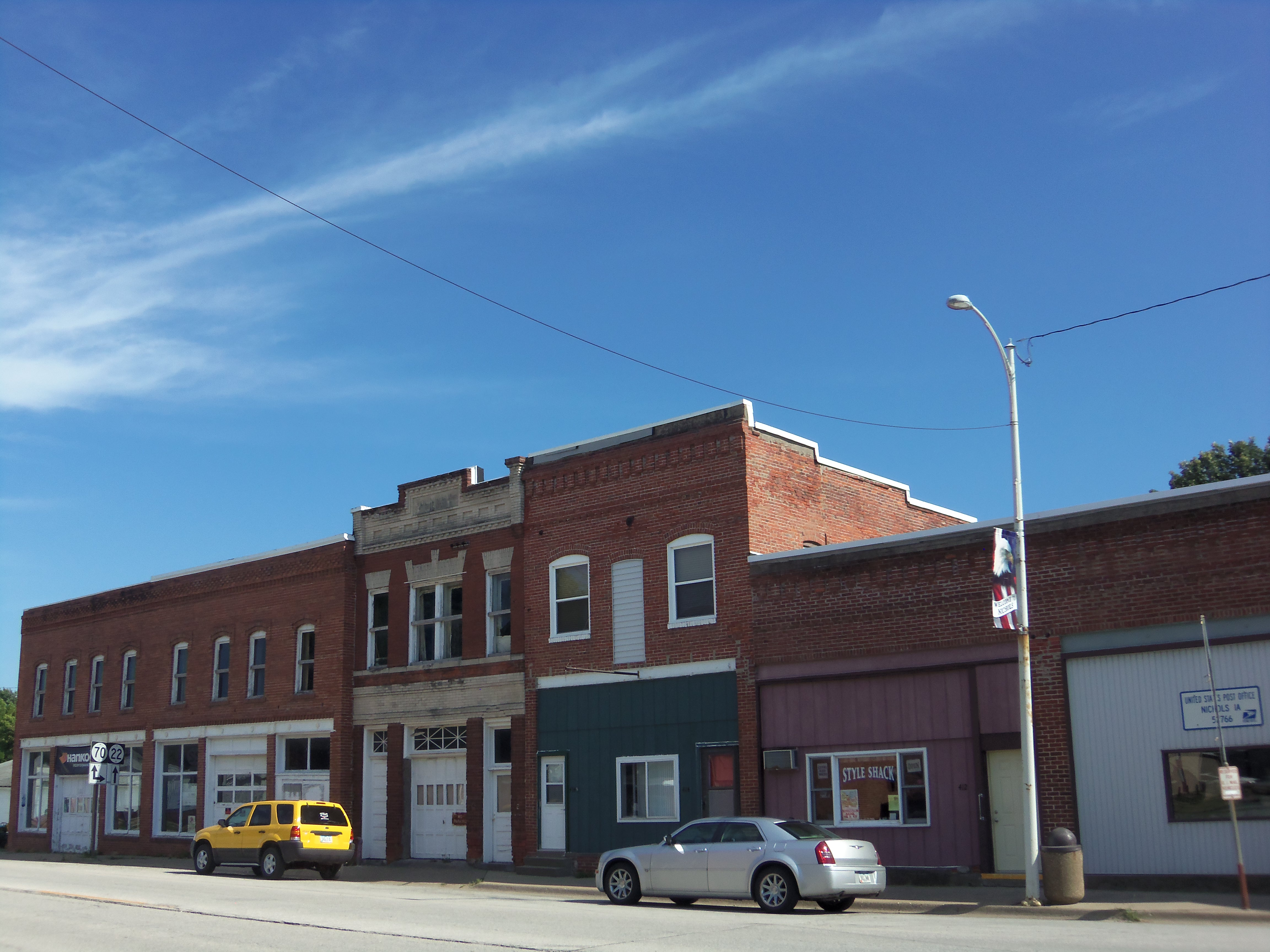

- Location within Iowa Location within the United States
- Location: Ijem Ave. between Railroad St. and Main St., Nichols, Iowa
- Coordinates: 41°28′52″N 91°18′30″W
- Architectural style: Italianate; Neolassical; Commercial
- NRHP reference No.: 100005566
- Added to NRHP: September 18, 2020

The Ijem Avenue Commercial Historic District is a historic district in Nichols, Iowa. It was listed on the National Register of Historic Places in 2020. It is composed of 12 one and two-story commercial buildings that date from the late nineteenth to the mid-twentieth century. It also includes one modern infill building. Nichols is a small town in western Muscatine County and was an important railroad shipping point and market town from about 1885 to about 1920. It was located along the Burlington, Cedar Rapids and Northern Railway, which came to town in 1871, and the Muscatine and Western Railroad, which arrived two years later. The two railroads intersected on the west side of the central business district, and both were incorporated into the Chicago, Rock Island and Pacific Railroad in the 1880s. The brick commercial buildings in the historic district were built during this period of time. They are attached one and two-story brick structures. The oldest buildings reflect the Italianate style with their arched windows, while the later buildings reflect the Neolassical and Commercial styles.

After the demise of the railroads in Nichols, the downtown area continued its farm-service function by focusing on highway traffic. Ijem Avenue was paved and widened in 1960 when it became part of Iowa Highway 22.
