= E. A. Sherman =

American politician (1844–1916)

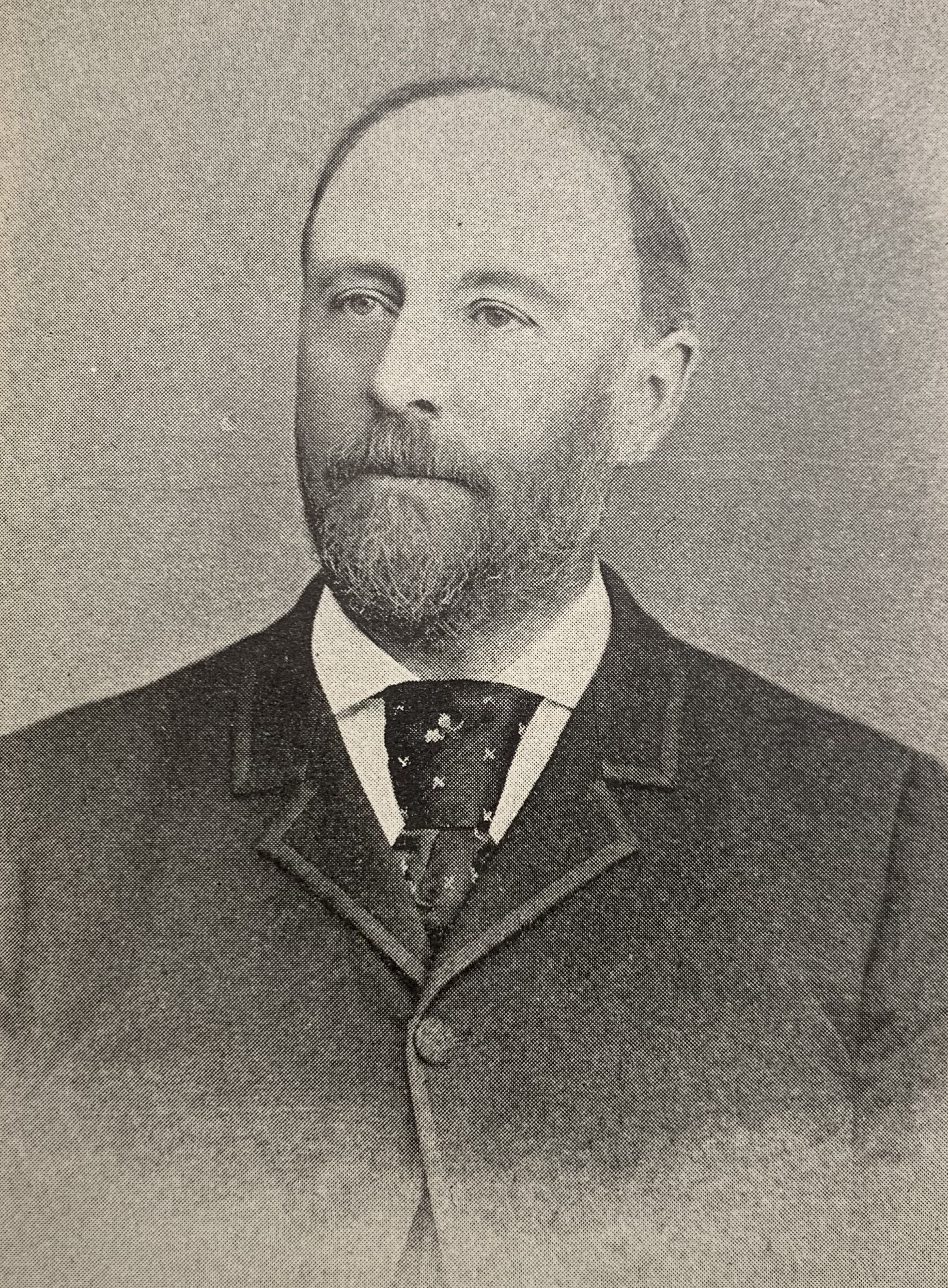
E.A. Sherman

Edwin Alonzo Sherman (June 19, 1844 - June 15, 1916), also known as E. A. Sherman, was the father of the Sioux Falls, South Dakota park system and an early pioneer and booster for the city. He was instrumental in the creation of McKennan Park.

Sherman was born in Wayland, Massachusetts on June 19, 1844 to Calvin and Lucy Parmenter Sherman.

In Sioux Falls, Sherman was engaged in a number of different ventures. He was half owner of the Sioux Falls Independent newspaper for a short while. He was superintendent of schools of Minnehaha County from 1874-6, and organized most of the school districts in the county during that time. He was the treasurer of the Dakota Territory from 1877-8 and in 1910 was elected to the state legislature as a Republican. He helped organize and served as president of two or three banks. He was involved with the building of the Willmar and Sioux Falls Railway. He also was admitted to the bar as a lawyer in November 1886.

Sherman helped his friend, Helen McKennan, prepare her will to donate the land to the city that would become McKennan Park. She died in September 1906.

Sherman is considered the father of the Sioux Falls parks system. He was instrumental, as a member of the Legislature, in passing the necessary enabling act to permit cities to acquire and operate a system of parks under the supervision of a park board.
