= Pike Township, Iowa =

Township in Muscatine County, Iowa, U.S.

Coordinates: 41.4675°N 91.2956°W

Pike Township is a township in Muscatine County, Iowa, in the United States.

== History ==
Pike Township was organized in 1853. Nichols was established in the early 1870s in an area of Section 15 of Pike Township known locally as Elephant Swamp.
