= Muscatine and Iowa City Railway =

The Muscatine and Iowa City Railway was a short-lived railroad that leased several lines in southeastern Iowa in 1916 from the Chicago, Rock Island and Pacific Railway. Those lines had been built in the 1870s and 1880s by predecessors of the Rock Island, and were mostly abandoned in the 1970s.

== History ==
The Muscatine Western Railroad was incorporated on May 23, 1870, to build a railroad from Muscatine, Iowa west to the Missouri River at the western border of the state, forming part of the proposed New York City-Council Bluffs Continental Railway. Work began on April 21, 1872, and on May 27 the Burlington, Cedar Rapids and Minnesota Railway (BCR&M) bought the property and franchises of the company. The first train ran on July 2 of that year, between Muscatine and the main line of the BCR&M at Nichols, and track was laid beyond to Riverside by the end of 1873. However, after the Panic of 1873 hit, the BCR&M defaulted on payment of interest on its bonds due November 1, 1873, and did not extend the line beyond Riverside.

The Iowa City and Western Railway was organized in 1878 to build from Iowa City west to Montezuma through the English River valley. It was built from Iowa City to What Cheer in 1879, and in 1880 a line was completed from Thornburg to Montezuma, making the original line beyond Thornburg to What Cheer into a branch. BCR&M successor Burlington, Cedar Rapids and Northern Railway (BCR&N) soon acquired control of and leased the Iowa City and Western, which connected with the old Muscatine Western near Riverside. The Chicago, Rock Island and Pacific Railway (CRI&P) gained control of the BCR&N by lease in June 1902, and in June 1903 the property of the BCR&N, along with that of the Iowa City and Western (which had been conveyed to the BCR&N in May 1902), was sold to the CRI&P.

The Muscatine and Iowa City Railway was incorporated on October 25, 1915, and leased, effective January 1, 1916, the aforementioned CRI&P lines: Muscatine to Montezuma, Iowa Junction (near Riverside) to Iowa City, and Thornburg to What Cheer. It planned to convert from steam to gas-electric locomotives for freight and self-propelled gas-electric motor cars for passengers. Operation lasted less than a year, as the company was placed in receivership on July 1, and ceased operations on August 11, returning the lines to the Rock Island.

In 1938, the CRI&P abandoned the eastern end of the line, between Muscatine and Iowa Junction, except for a short branch from Nichols to Lone Tree, which was operated until 1958. The branch to What Cheer was abandoned in 1957, but the remainder of the line, now accessed from the Rock Island's main line at Iowa City, remained intact until 1972, when the Central Iowa Railway bought the line from Hills, just outside Iowa City, to Montezuma. That company soon ceased operations, and the stub at Iowa City is now operated by the Cedar Rapids and Iowa City Railway.
