= Keokuk Junction Railway =

Class III railroad in Illinois and Iowa

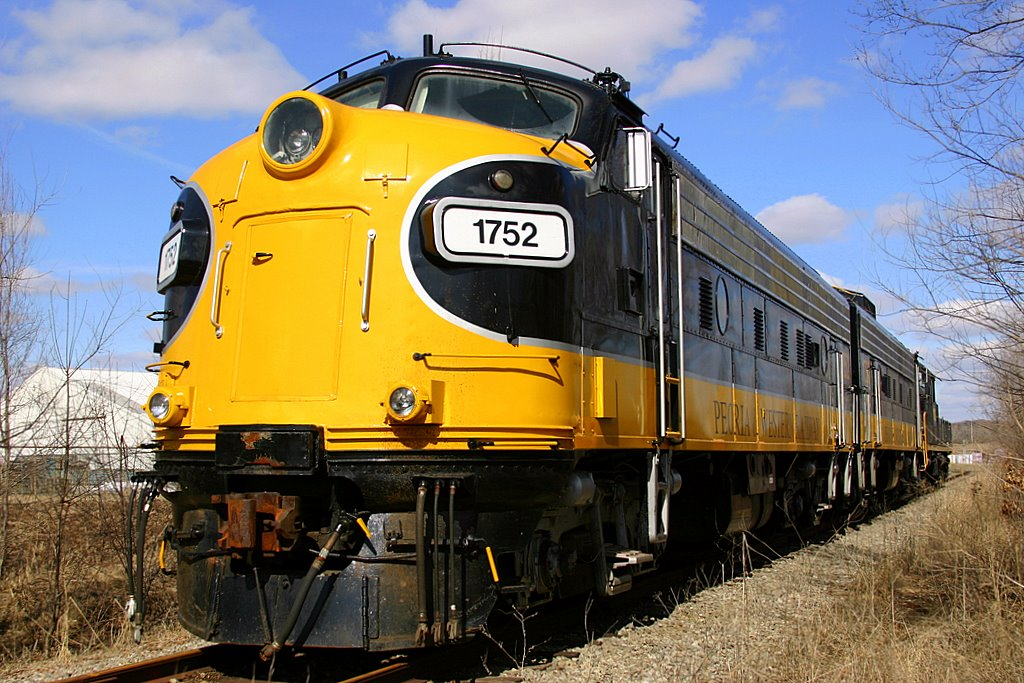
- No. 1752 in black and yellow "Peoria & Western" livery

Overview
- Headquarters: Peoria County, Illinois; Keokuk, Iowa
- Reporting mark: KJRY
- Locale: Central and western Illinois; Keokuk, Iowa
- Dates of operation: May 1980 (current company)–

Technical
- Track gauge: Standard gauge
- Length: 126 miles (203 km) operated + 15.5 miles (24.9 km) trackage rights

Other
- Website: patriotrail.com/rail/keokuk-junction-railway-co-kjry/

The Keokuk Junction Railway Co. (reporting mark KJRY), is a Class III railroad in the U.S. states of Illinois and Iowa. It was formerly a subsidiary of Pioneer Railcorp, but now operates as a subsidiary of Patriot Rail Company.

== History ==
The present company was incorporated in 1980 as the Keokuk Northern Real Estate Co., formed in May 1980 to purchase 4.5 miles (7.2 km) of Chicago, Rock Island and Pacific Railroad (CRI&P) yard trackage in Keokuk, Iowa. In September 1981, the KJRY obtained the trackage, and they quickly commenced operations. In 1986, the KJRY purchased 28 miles (45 km) of trackage between Keokuk and La Harpe, Illinois, from the Santa Fe Railway, formerly owned by the Toledo, Peoria and Western (TP&W). The KJRY began serving a corn-processing plant in Keokuk owned by Roquette America, which became the railway's primary source of income.

In 1995, when the Santa Fe merged with the Burlington Northern Railroad (BN) to create BNSF, the KJRY requested trackage rights over BNSF to interchange with Norfolk Southern (NS) in Hannibal, Missouri, and the Southern Pacific (SP) in West Quincy, Missouri, but they were denied by the Interstate Commerce Commission (ICC). In March 1996, the Surface Transportation Board (STB), the ICC's successor, approved Pioneer Railcorp's purchase of 66.62% of the KJRY's shares from majority shareholder John Warfield, making the KJRY their subsidiary.

The KJRY subsequently expanded their operations with additional trackage acquisitions; in February 2005, they purchased the TP&W's 76-mile (122 km) western section between La Harpe to Peoria, Illinois; in December 2011, the KJRY purchased 12.1 miles (19.5 km) of trackage between La Harpe and Lomax, Illinois, and they were granted trackage rights between Lomax and Fort Madison, Iowa. On July 31, 2019, Brookhaven Rail Partners acquired Pioneer Railcorp, gaining ownership of the KJRY in the process.

== Connections ==
- BNSF — Keokuk, Iowa, Bushnell, Illinois, and Peoria, Illinois
- Canadian National Railway — Peoria, Illinois
- Illinois and Midland Railroad — Peoria, Illinois
- Iowa Interstate Railroad — Peoria, Illinois
- Norfolk Southern Railway — Peoria, Illinois
- Pioneer Industrial Railway — Peoria, Illinois
- Tazewell and Peoria Railroad — Peoria, Illinois
- Toledo, Peoria and Western Railway — Hollis, Illinois
- Union Pacific Railroad — Fort Madison, Iowa and Peoria, Illinois
