= Tazewell and Peoria Railroad =

Railway line in the United States of America

Overview
- Headquarters: Creve Coeur, Illinois
- Reporting mark: TZPR
- Locale: Illinois
- Dates of operation: November 1, 2004–

Technical
- Track gauge: 4 ft 8 1/2 in (1,435 mm) standard gauge

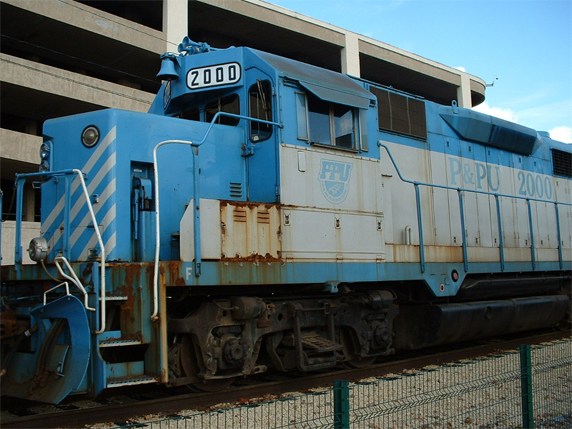
PPU 2000 at Peoria, IL.

The Tazewell & Peoria Railroad (T&P) (reporting mark TZPR) (November 1, 2004—present) is a short-line railroad, running entirely in Peoria County and Tazewell County, Illinois, and formed by Genesee & Wyoming Inc. to lease the assets of the century-old Peoria and Pekin Union Railway (P&PU), which is owned by Union Pacific, Norfolk Southern and Canadian National. It switches close to 100,000 cars per year and has about 142 miles of track. Genesee & Wyoming owns 81 miles of TZPR and can handle freight cars with up to 286,000 pounds of cargo.

The P&PU track straddles the Illinois River at Peoria, Illinois, making the T&P an important transportation link for industrial sites such as the Caterpillar plant in East Peoria, Illinois. In addition to interconnections with the P&PU track's owners, the T&P interconnects with the Burlington Northern Santa Fe, the Toledo, Peoria & Western, the Iowa Interstate Railroad, the Canadian National Railway, the Keokuk Junction Railway, the Norfolk Southern Railway, the Union Pacific Railway, and the T&P's sister Illinois and Midland Railroad. All of these interchanges are at Creve Coeur, Illinois.

== Locomotive roster ==
Model	Road number
601	EMD NW2
602	EMD SW7
700	EMD SW14
701	EMD SW10
702	EMD SW10
714	EMD SW1500
715	EMD SW1500
1520	EMD SW1500
1521	EMD SW1500
800	PPU SC15A-3
801	PPU SC15A-3
802	PPU SC15A-3
1351	EMD SW10
1352	EMD SW10
2000	EMD GP35R
2001	EMD GP35R
3000	EMD GP10

== See also ==
- Peoria and Pekin Union Railway for pre-2005 history of this rail
- Genesee and Wyoming Railroad — owner of TZPR
- Illinois and Midland Railroad — adjacent rail owned by GWRR
