= Nichols, Iowa =

- City
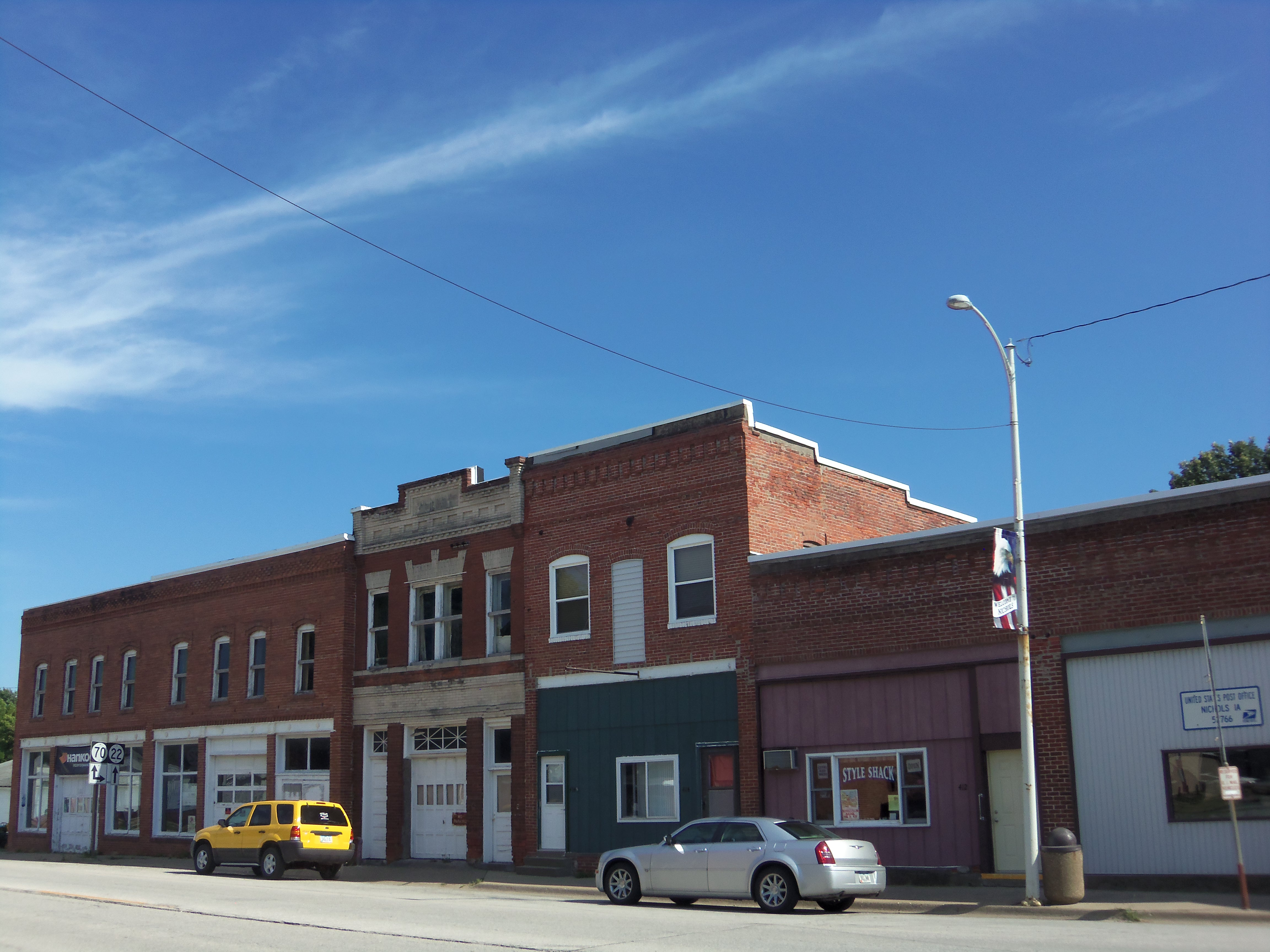
- Buildings in downtown Nichols, Iowa

- Location of Nichols, Iowa
- Coordinates: 41°28′47″N 91°18′29″W
- Country: United States
- State: Iowa
- County: Muscatine

Area
  - Total: 0.23 sq mi (0.59 km^{2})
  - Land: 0.23 sq mi (0.59 km^{2})
  - Water: 0 sq mi (0.00 km^{2})
- Elevation: 630 ft (190 m)

Population (2020)
  - Total: 340
  - Density: 1,492.5/sq mi (576.25/km^{2})
- Time zone: UTC-6 (Central (CST))
  - Summer (DST): UTC-5 (CDT)
- ZIP code: 52766
- Area code: 319
- FIPS code: 19-56685
- GNIS feature ID: 2395232

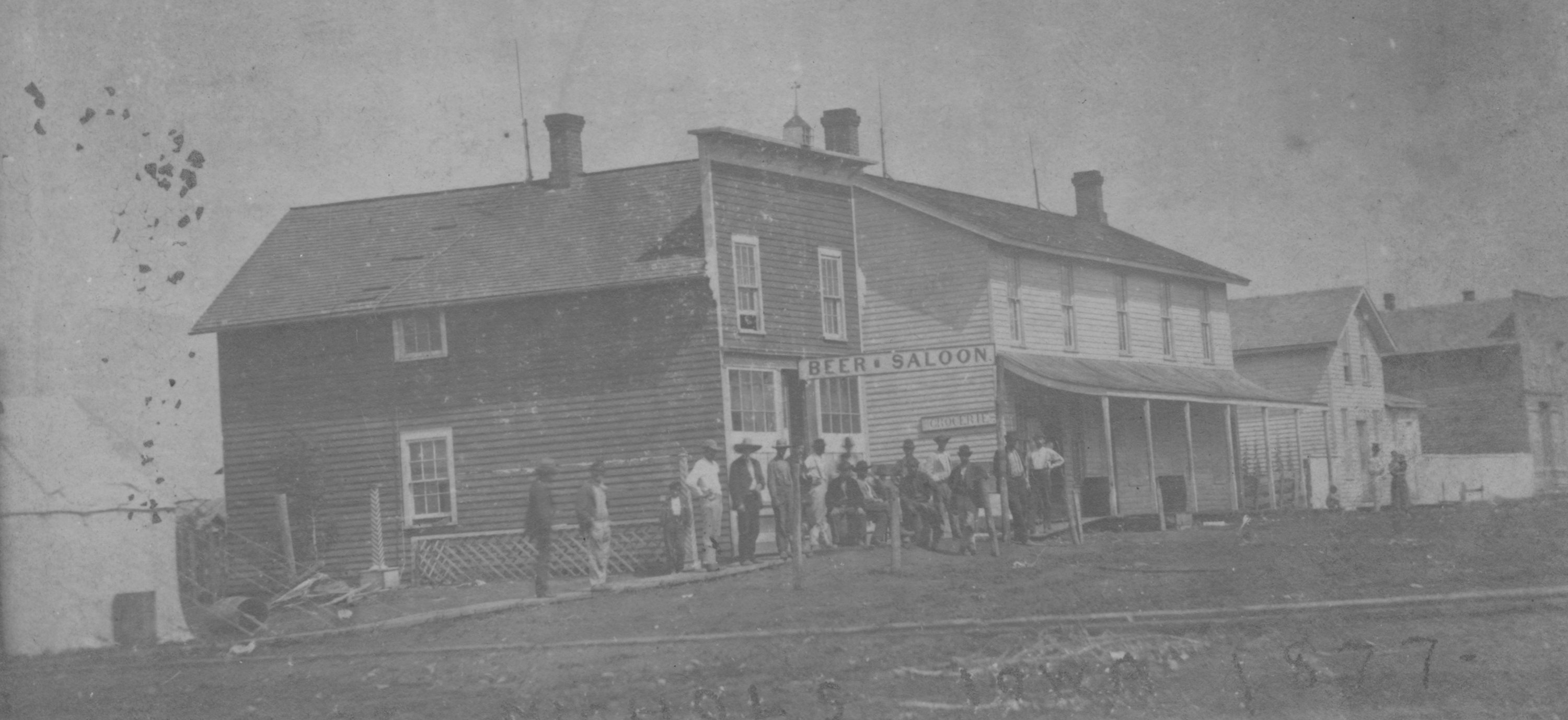
Main Street, Nichols, Iowa in 1877

Nichols is a city in Muscatine County, Iowa, United States. The population was 340 at the time of the 2020 census. It is part of the Muscatine Micropolitan Statistical Area.

== Name ==
The original name of the site of the current town was Railroad Addition. The town was later referred to as Nichols Station in reference to the previous holder of the town's site. Nichols was named by the early settler Benjamin F. Nichols in honor of his father, Samuel Nichols, who was instrumental in bringing the railroad to the area. Samuel Nichols was a heavy investor in the Burlington, Cedar Rapids and Northern Railroad Company as well as owner of large landholdings. Samuel Nichols had given the rail company the right of way to construct the rail line across his land, as well as to establish a depot at the current site of Nichols.

== History ==
Nichols was established in the early 1870s in an area of Section 15 of Pike Township known locally as Elephant Swamp. The community was intended as a rail town for the shipment of agriculture products and furs to distant markets, and had been constructed on land donated to the rail company by Samuel and Benjamin Nichols with the intention of establishing a rail depot. The lots for the future community were surveyed by county surveyor George Bumgardner in June 1871. Two rail lines would eventually run through the town – the Muscatine & Western Railroad and the Burlington, Cedar Rapids and Northern Railroad – which were both branches of the Rock Island system. The first rail line and rail depot was constructed in the early 1870s. Dr. S. H. Smith constructed the first building on the future site of Nichols in 1871, which Mr Smith used as both a drug store and as a home. Construction on the Muscatine & Western Railroad reached the site in 1873, and the rail company laid out an addition to the town, calling it Railroad Addition. At first many of the buildings and homes in the community were log cabins, which were then replaced by more permanent brick buildings. Benjamin Nichols established the first post office in 1870 and served as the first postmaster. The first school was built in 1872. In the winter of 1873-1874 a Christian church was organized with services being held in schoolhouses until the construction of the church in 1874, with services being conducted by Rev. John Powell. The German Evangelical Protestant Church was organized in 1874 by Rev. K. F. Obermann. The Catholic church – Church of St. Mary - was built in 1874 with Father Nicholas Dugan serving as its first pastor. A Methodist church was organized in 1875 by J. A. Bolton. The town soon grew with the addition of several banks, an opera house, and a town hall that was constructed in 1897. The early economy of the community centered on the two rail lines that ran through the community as well as the buying and shipping of furs as well as agriculture. The Foley and Brugman Brothers operated two large grain elevators which held 15,000 bushels each. Cattle and hogs were also shipped out to markets through the rail lines.

On September 18, 2020, Nichols' central business district was listed on the National Register of Historic Places as the Ijem Avenue Commercial Historic District.

== Geography ==
Nichols is located in section 15 of Pike Township, situated in the western edge of Iowa's Muscatine County. The area is a mix of prairie and rich bottom land. Jordan Creek flows just southeast of the community and flows into Wapsinonoc Creek, a tributary of the Cedar River.

According to the United States Census Bureau, the city has a total area of 0.23 square miles (0.60 km^{2}), all land.

== Demographics ==
Historical populations
Year	Pop.	±%
1880	286	—
1890	237	−17.1%
1900	398	+67.9%
1910	396	−0.5%
1920	387	−2.3%
1930	369	−4.7%
1940	357	−3.3%
1950	348	−2.5%
1960	329	−5.5%
1970	396	+20.4%
1980	375	−5.3%
1990	366	−2.4%
2000	374	+2.2%
2010	374	+0.0%
2020	340	−9.1%
Source:"U.S. Census website". United States Census Bureau. and Iowa Data Center; Source: U.S. Decennial Census

=== 2020 census ===
As of the census of 2020, there were 340 people, 143 households, and 106 families residing in the city. The population density was 1,472.7 inhabitants per square mile (568.6/km^{2}). There were 151 housing units at an average density of 654.1 per square mile (252.5/km^{2}). The racial makeup of the city was 86.8% White, 1.8% Black or African American, 0.0% Native American, 1.5% Asian, 0.0% Pacific Islander, 1.2% from other races and 8.8% from two or more races. Hispanic or Latino persons of any race comprised 11.2% of the population.

Of the 143 households, 34.3% of which had children under the age of 18 living with them, 49.0% were married couples living together, 11.9% were cohabitating couples, 21.0% had a female householder with no spouse or partner present and 18.2% had a male householder with no spouse or partner present. 25.9% of all households were non-families. 21.0% of all households were made up of individuals, 9.1% had someone living alone who was 65 years old or older.

The median age in the city was 46.3 years. 22.6% of the residents were under the age of 20; 4.4% were between the ages of 20 and 24; 21.8% were from 25 and 44; 32.4% were from 45 and 64; and 18.8% were 65 years of age or older. The gender makeup of the city was 52.1% male and 47.9% female.

=== 2010 census ===
As of the census of 2010, there were 374 people, 142 households, and 105 families residing in the city. The population density was 1,626.1 inhabitants per square mile (627.8/km^{2}). There were 150 housing units at an average density of 652.2 per square mile (251.8/km^{2}). The racial makeup of the city was 87.4% White, 1.1% African American, 2.1% Asian, 8.3% from other races, and 1.1% from two or more races. Hispanic or Latino of any race were 16.3% of the population.

There were 142 households, of which 35.9% had children under the age of 18 living with them, 54.2% were married couples living together, 14.1% had a female householder with no husband present, 5.6% had a male householder with no wife present, and 26.1% were non-families. 22.5% of all households were made up of individuals, and 5.6% had someone living alone who was 65 years of age or older. The average household size was 2.63 and the average family size was 2.99.

The median age in the city was 36.3 years. 28.6% of residents were under the age of 18; 6.4% were between the ages of 18 and 24; 26.5% were from 25 to 44; 27.4% were from 45 to 64; and 11.2% were 65 years of age or older. The gender makeup of the city was 50.5% male and 49.5% female.

=== 2000 census ===
As of the census of 2000, there were 374 people, 138 households, and 102 families residing in the city. The population density was 1,604.8 inhabitants per square mile (619.6/km^{2}). There were 142 housing units at an average density of 609.3 per square mile (235.3/km^{2}). The racial makeup of the city was 86.36% White, 1.07% African American, 1.60% Asian, 9.89% from other races, and 1.07% from two or more races. Hispanic or Latino of any race were 22.99% of the population.

There were 138 households, out of which 34.1% had children under the age of 18 living with them, 61.6% were married couples living together, 11.6% had a female householder with no husband present, and 25.4% were non-families. 19.6% of all households were made up of individuals, and 8.7% had someone living alone who was 65 years of age or older. The average household size was 2.71 and the average family size was 3.03.

In the city, the population was spread out, with 26.2% under the age of 18, 11.5% from 18 to 24, 28.1% from 25 to 44, 24.6% from 45 to 64, and 9.6% who were 65 years of age or older. The median age was 34 years. For every 100 females, there were 105.5 males. For every 100 females age 18 and over, there were 97.1 males.

The median income for a household in the city was $43,750, and the median income for a family was $47,917. Males had a median income of $32,045 versus $21,750 for females. The per capita income for the city was $16,082. About 4.7% of families and 13.7% of the population were below the poverty line, including 11.8% of those under age 18 and 14.0% of those age 65 or over.

== Education ==
The West Liberty Community School District operates local public schools.
