= Central Iowa Railway =

Central Iowa Railway (formally named the Central Iowa Transportation Cooperative) was a 63-mile (101-km) freight railroad that operated during 1974 from Hills, Iowa to Montezuma, Iowa.

== History ==
On January 4 , 1973, the Central Iowa Railway took over operations of a 63.41-mile (102.05-km) branch line that its owners had purchased from the line's former owner, the Chicago, Rock Island and Pacific Railroad. The Central Iowa operated in Amish-settled country and had one locomotive: a 600-horsepower EMD SW1 that formerly had been owned by the Burlington Northern Railroad. The railroad's founders gave the blue and black SW1 locomotive the unusual unit number of J33-3 after verse 33:3 in the Book of Jeremiah in the Bible, which says, "Call unto me, and I will answer thee, and show thee great and mighty things, which thou knowest not."

The Central Iowa Railway was headquartered at 425 B Avenue in Kalona, Iowa, and its president was Harlan A. Stubbs (1909–2003). Extending south and west from Hills, the railroad's freight stations were in the towns of Hills, Riverside, Kalona, Wellman, Kinross, South English, Webster, Keswick, Thornburg, Gibson, Barnes City and finally, Montezuma.some were not active or gone like Kalona, south English, Thornburg and Kinross. Riverside the Central Iowa Railway was short-lived; the stock markets crashed and that caused the operations to stop and suspended operations in may 4 1978 then tracks were ripped up in 1979 .

The Central Iowa Railway is not to be confused with the Des Moines and Central Iowa Railway, which now is part of the Union Pacific Railroad, or with the Central Railroad of Iowa, which operated in Iowa in the 1800s.

== Abandonment ==
The federal government formally approved abandonment of the Central Iowa Railway's entire 63.4-mile line between Hills and Montezuma on May 4, 1978. The tracks were later removed in 1979. A small section of track just south of Hills, Iowa remained in place until it was removed in June 1992, however.

== Today ==
The Central Iowa Railway's line never was brought back into service, but there are plans to bring it back rebuilding the tracks from hills to Kinross trying it was approved by the government to bring it back are from 2028 to 2030 Riverside and kalona hope to bring it back and to raise money. and its right-of-way largely reverted to adjacent farms. However, the Central Iowa's connection to the outside world, at Hills, changed hands in 1980, when the trustees of the Chicago, Rock Island and Pacific Railroad sold the Rock Island's 7-mile line between Hills and Iowa City to the Cedar Rapids and Iowa City Railway. The CRANDIC owns the Hills-Iowa City line to the present day. Until 2018 the line was operated by the Iowa Interstate Railroad from its own yard in Iowa City. Since then the CRANDIC has once again assumed operations with a captive locomotive interchanging cars with the IAIS at Iowa City.
