= Clinton, Davenport and Muscatine Railway =

Defunct interurban railway line in the United States of America

Overview
- Locale: Iowa
- Dates of operation: 1904–1940

Technical
- Track gauge: 4 ft 8 1/2 in (1,435 mm) standard gauge

The Clinton, Davenport, and Muscatine Railway, known as the CD&M, was an interurban passenger and freight railroad that connected its namesake cities of Clinton, Davenport and Muscatine, Iowa.

== History ==
The railway began in 1904 as the Iowa and Illinois Railway - spanning the 33 miles between Clinton and Davenport. It began operation in 1904. The second portion, initially the Davenport and Muscatine Railway, was 25 miles long and began operation in 1912. The two lines were acquired by United Light and Railways in 1912. In 1926 the two were merged to become the Clinton, Davenport and Muscatine.

The Clinton-Davenport line was operated at 600V, and the Davenport-Muscatine line was 1200V. So different cars were used on the two segments. The interurban depot in Davenport was located at 217 Brady St.

Stops along the lines as of May 1934 included:

- Clinton
- Camanche
- Shaffton
- Princeton
- Le Claire
- Country Club
- Pleasant Valley
- Iowanna
- Bettendorf
- Davenport
- Blue Grass
- Buffalo
- Montpelier
- Pleasant Prairie
- Rainbow
- Fairport
- Sweetland
- Muscatine

Passenger traffic was discontinued on the Muscatine portion in November 1938, and the Clinton portion in March 1940. Freight traffic continued and was eventually taken over by the Davenport, Rock Island and North Western Railway, a joint subsidiary of the Chicago, Burlington and Quincy Railroad and Chicago, Milwaukee, St. Paul and Pacific Railroad.
