= Toledo, Peoria and Western Railway =

Short-line railroad in Illinois and Indiana

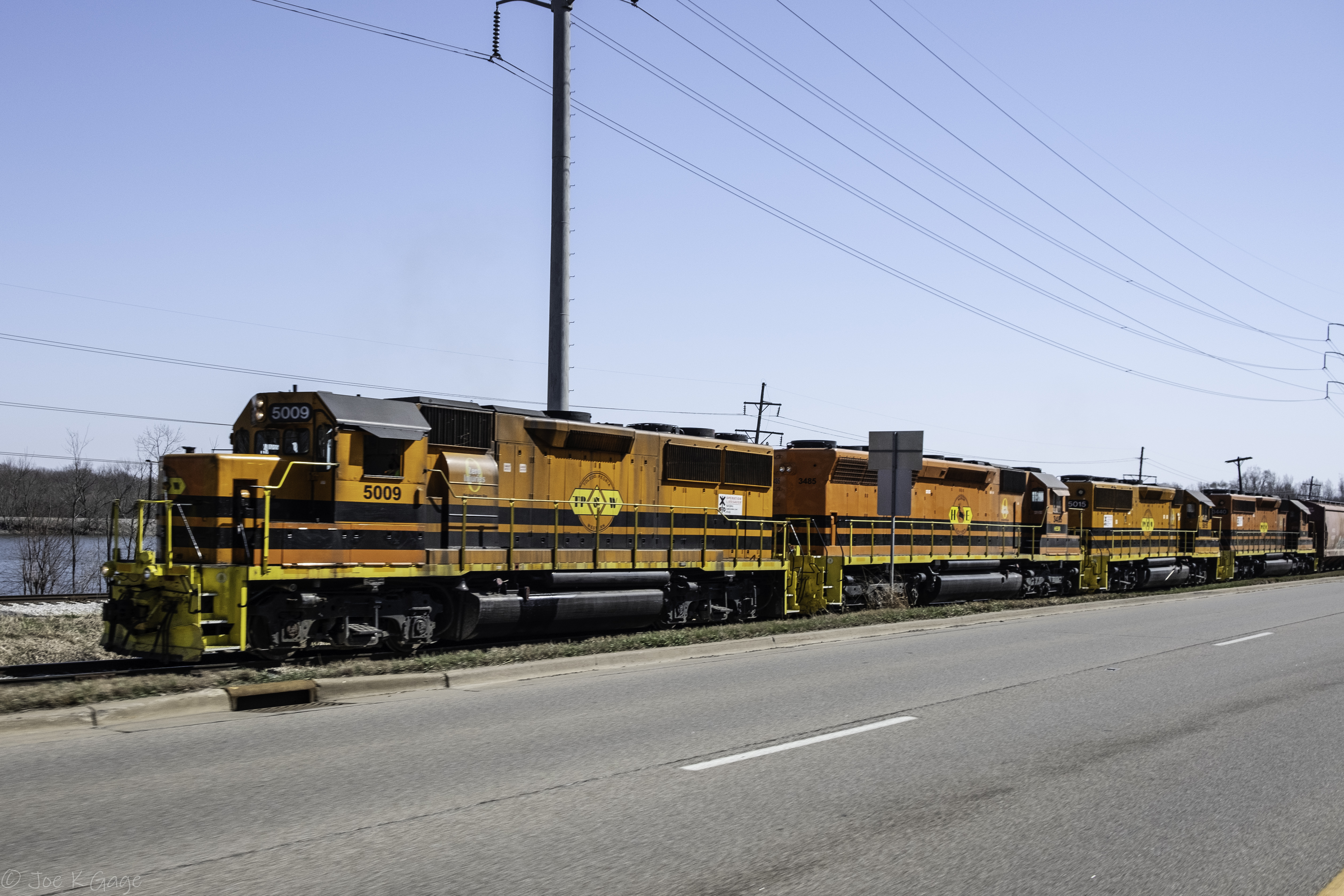
- TP&W GP50 No. 5009 leading a freight train in Peoria, Illinois, April 3, 2021

Overview
- Parent company: Genesee & Wyoming
- Headquarters: East Peoria, Illinois
- Reporting mark: TPW
- Dates of operation: 1864–1983; 1989–present
- Predecessor: Toledo, Peoria and Warsaw Railway

Technical
- Track gauge: 4 ft 8 1/2 in (1,435 mm) standard gauge
- Length: 247 miles (398 km)

The Toledo, Peoria and Western Railway (reporting mark TPW), formerly nicknamed the "Tip-Up", is a shortline railroad that operates 247 miles (398 km) of trackage between Mapleton and Peoria in Illinois, and Logansport, Indiana. TP&W also interchanges with multiple surrounding railroads, and they have trackage rights over other railroads between Peoria and Galesburg, between Logansport and Kokomo, and between Reynolds and Lafayette. As of 2026, the railroad is owned by Genesee & Wyoming Inc.

== Company formation and expansion ==
The Toledo, Peoria and Western's earliest predecessor was the Peoria and Oquawka Railroad, which was chartered in 1849, with the goal of providing a rail connection between the Illinois River in Peoria and the Mississippi River. In 1857, they completed construction on their route between Peoria and East Burlington, Illinois. Despite "Oquawka" being incorporated in the name, the railroad was forced to bypass Oquawka, since town officials were reluctant to permit trains in their area.

By 1860, the Peoria and Oquawka extended their route to the Illinois-Indiana state line in Effner, where they interchanged with the recently chartered Logansport, Peoria and Burlington Railroad (LP&B). By 1859, the Peoria and Oquawka fell under receivership, and the company was quickly absorbed into the Chicago, Burlington and Quincy Railroad (CB&Q). In 1861, the line between Peoria and Effner was sold to the LP&B, and then in 1864, the LP&B was reorganized as the Toledo, Peoria and Warsaw Railway (TP&W).

Despite "Toledo" being incorporated in the name, the railway never extended their route to Toledo, Ohio. In 1868, the TP&W absorbed the Mississippi and Wabash Railroad, which had constructed a route between Peoria and Warsaw, Illinois. In 1871, the TP&W opened two routes; one main line over the Mississippi River between Hamilton and Keokuk, Iowa; and one branch line between La Harpe and Lomax. The latter allowed the TP&W to interchange with the CB&Q, and the railway was granted trackage rights over the CB&Q's branch between Lomax and Burlington, Iowa.

Later in the 1870s, the TP&W experienced some financial problems. In 1880, the TP&W was reorganized as the Toledo, Peoria and Western Railroad (TP&W), and the company became leased by the Wabash, St. Louis and Pacific Railway. The lease lasted until 1884, and then on March 28, 1887, the Toledo, Peoria and Western Railway was incorporated and took over operations. In 1893, a controlling interest of the TP&W was purchased by the Pennsylvania Railroad (PRR), who interchanged with the TP&W at Effner, and the purchase allowed the PRR to move their western terminus to Keokuk, and to interchange with the CB&Q at Lomax. The CB&Q and the PRR both quickly became joint owners of the TP&W.

== George McNear ownership and disputes ==
By the early 1900s, the Peoria area became a primary hub for multiple class I railroads with their own direct routes to the area, including the CB&Q and the PRR. The TP&W consequently began to operate at a financial loss from declining traffic, and in the mid-1920s, the railway fell under receivership. During that time, the railway's passenger operations experienced ridership losses, since some newly paved state highway roads paralleled their trackage. The CB&Q and the PRR both attempted to absorb the TP&W, but in 1926, the railway was purchased for $1.3 million by George P. McNear Jr., who was a former New York Central (NYC) executive and investor.

George McNear became the TP&W's newest president, and he quickly brought the railway out of receivership by selling some of their property for $500,000, including a terminal facility to the Peoria and Pekin Union Railway, and he floated a bond issue for $800,000. One of McNear's other tasks for the TP&W was the abandonment of their surplus CB&Q connection in Lomax, which was replaced with a new connection with the Atchison, Topeka and Santa Fe Railway (Santa Fe). The railway began marketing their operations as a bypass route around the congested railroad traffic of Chicago and St. Louis, garnering a favorable response from several railroads.

The TP&W also worked to upgrade their equipment roster and to speed up their freight operations, and they discontinued their passenger and mail operations. In 1937, the TP&W purchased six H-10 class 4-8-4 "Northern" locomotives (Nos. 80–85) from the American Locomotive Company (ALCO). The H-10s were the lightest 4-8-4s ever built for a North American railroad, weighing only 361,000 pounds (164 tonnes). They were equipped with 69-inch (1,800 mm) diameter driving wheels, 23.5-by-30-inch (600 mm × 760 mm) cylinders, and a boiler pressure of 250 psi (1,700 kPa), and they produced a tractive effort of 51,000 pounds-force (230 kN).

Under McNear's leadership, the TP&W became one of very few railroads in the United States to turn profits during the Great Depression of the 1930s. Despite his successful efforts to reorganize the TP&W, McNear became unpopular with labor unions; McNear enforced his own personalized labor rules and methods, to which all thirteen of the TP&W-tied unions disagreed with, and they initiated multiple unsuccessful labor strikes to restore the railway's previous conventional rules.

On December 28, 1941, another TP&W strike was initiated, after the TP&W announced a new wage scale and another new set of rules. The strike was quickly stopped on March 21, 1942, when U.S. President Franklin D. Roosevelt ordered for the federal government to confiscate control of the TP&W to have the railway aid the ongoing World War II effort, and John W. Barriger III was appointed their federal manager. In 1945, when World War II ended, control of the TP&W was returned to George McNear, but the thirteen unions instantly reinitiated the strike.

The strike lasted for nineteen months, and it involved multiple shootings; on two separate occasions, some gun shots were fired into an automobile with non-union employees and into a locomotive cab; on February 6, 1946, some armed guards hired by the TP&W shot five strikers (two killed; three wounded) at Gridley, Illinois. McNear had the TP&W shut down after the latter incident, but in December 1946, federal judge J. Leroy Adair ordered for the railway to resume operations, and he issued an injunction to prevent interference from strikers.

On the night of March 10, 1947, George McNear was shot and killed while walking back to his home from a Bradley Braves basketball game during a power outage. McNear's murder case remains unsolved, but it was believed to be connected to the lengthy strike. Following McNear's death, the TP&W fell under control of McNear estate trustees, and Frisco Railway executive J. Russell Coulter became the TP&W's newest president. In May 1947, Coulter restored most of the older labor rules, and the strike quickly ended.

The labor strike disputes resulted in 50% of the TP&W's traffic being lost, and they resulted in some traffic employees and executives leaving the company, but by the early 1950s, the railway regained their lost traffic and profitability under Coulter's leadership. One task Coulter did for the TP&W was to purchase a fleet of ALCO and EMD diesel locomotives to dieselize their roster, and the process was completed in October 1950. The railway boosted the marketing of their operations as a bypass route and an originator for Peoria traffic, and they boosted their interchange traffic with the PRR, the Santa Fe, the CB&Q, the Minneapolis and St. Louis (M&StL), the Nickel Plate Road (NKP), and the New York Central.

== PRR and Santa Fe stewardship ==
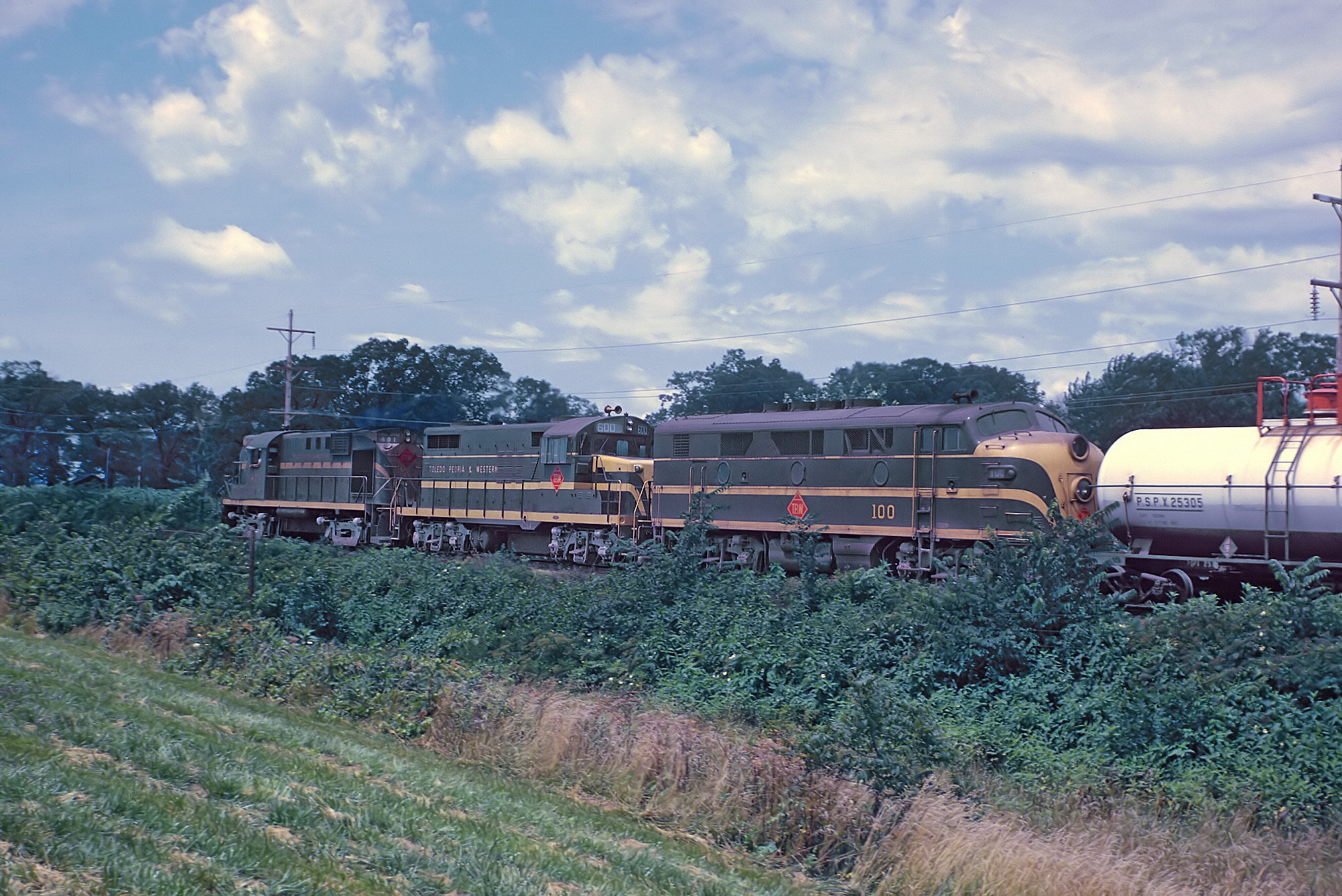
TP&W RS-11 No. 401, GP18 No. 600, and F3 No. 100 hauling a freight train in Leonard, Illinois, July 22, 1962

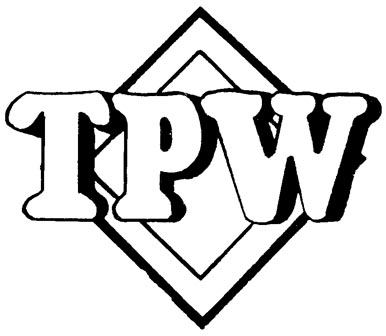
The TP&W logo used in the early 1980s

In January 1960, the PRR and the Santa Fe jointly purchased the TP&W from the McNear estate, with the two companies gaining an equal amount of shares. During the 1960s, the TP&W experienced additional declining traffic from losses of interchange partners; in 1960, the Minneapolis and St. Louis was absorbed into the Chicago and North Western (C&NW); in 1964, the NKP and the Wabash were absorbed into the Norfolk and Western Railway (N&W), with the Wabash providing a direct route to Kansas City; and in 1968, the PRR and the NYC merged to create Penn Central (PC).

During that time, the Santa Fe opened an alternate bypass route to Streator, Illinois, where they directly interchanged with the NYC. The TP&W secured trackage rights over the Santa Fe between Lomax and Fort Madison, Iowa, to preserve their interchangeability. By the end of 1970, the TP&W operated for 239 miles (385 km) over 323 miles (520 km) of trackage; that same year, they reported 520 million ton-miles of revenue freight.

In February 1970, the TP&W's Illinois River bridge in Peoria was collapsed by a barge tow. Since the railway was unable to afford to build a replacement, they were forced to gain trackage rights over the Peoria and Pekin Union's nearby bridge. When Conrail was formed in 1976, the former PRR line between Effner and Logansport, Indiana, was put up for abandonment, and the TP&W quickly purchased the line to preserve their eastern railroad connections.

In 1979, the Santa Fe acquired the former PRR's interest in the TP&W from Conrail, making the TP&W the Santa Fe's wholly owned subsidiary. In 1981, in accordance with the Staggers Rail Act, Conrail closed their TP&W interchange in Logansport, in favor of their former NYC Streator connection, and the TP&W's traffic consequently further declined.

The Santa Fe decided to reverse the TP&W's traffic losses by operating intermodal container trains on their route, so in 1983, the TP&W installed their Hoosierlift Intermodal Terminal, which paralleled Interstate 65 near Remington, Indiana. The TP&W's Hoosierlift facility initially struggled to compete with the Santa Fe's own container terminal in Chicago, but within the following years, the TP&W's intermodal operations began turning profits. On December 31, 1983, the TP&W was absorbed into the Santa Fe and became part of their Illinois Division. Absorbing the TP&W permitted the Santa Fe to abandon most of their Pekin Branch.

In August 1986, the Santa Fe announced that they placed the former TP&W trackage up for sale to shortline operators, citing that the right-of-way had become marginal for the Santa Fe's overhead, and they were exploring ways to satisfy the Interstate Commerce Commission (ICC), which had rejected their merger with the Southern Pacific (SP) and ordered their parent SFSP Corporation to divest their anti-competitive assets. That same year, the Santa Fe sold a 28-mile (45 km) portion of the TP&W line between La Harpe and Keokuk, to the Keokuk Junction Railway (KJRY), which had been created to operate former Rock Island (RI) trackage in Keokuk.

== Post-Santa Fe activity ==
On February 3, 1989, the rest of the former TP&W trackage was sold, along with a fleet of nineteen EMD GP20 locomotives, at an undisclosed cost to TP&W Acquisition, a corporation founded by SeaLand service director Gordon Fuller, and the TP&W Railway was revived as an independent company. The acquisition was a leveraged buyout, and the TP&W was consequently in debt to multiple investment firms, including Toronto-Dominion Bank, but Fuller, who became the TP&W's newest president, opted to use the railway's profits to pay back the firms.

Fuller located the TP&W's newest headquarters in Bound Brook, New Jersey, since the headquarters of multiple shipping corporations were nearby. The TP&W subsequently developed interchange partnerships with other railroads, including CSX Transportation in Watseka, the Illinois Central (IC) in Gilman, and the Southern Pacific in Chenoa. They also began to interchange unit coal trains with CSX, but they quickly lost the contract to do so to the C&NW.

By the mid-1990s, intermodal container operations accounted for 55% of the TP&W's total traffic, and most of the containers consisted of vehicle parts for the railway's primary customers: an Isuzu plant in Lafayette, a Mitsubishi plant in Normal, and Caterpillar. The railway also regained their traffic around Logansport, since the Winamac Southern Railway (WSRY) was created to operate some abandoned Conrail trackage in northern Indiana. Some of the TP&W's diesel locomotives were repainted in grey New York Central paint schemes, as a homage to the beginning of Fuller's railroad career at a NYC management training program and his former position as a Penn Central superintendent.

In 1995, when the Santa Fe merged with the Burlington Northern Railroad (BN) to create BNSF, the TP&W was granted trackage rights over BN's line between Peoria and Galesburg. In May that same year, Fuller sold a 40% interest of the TP&W to the New York, Susquehanna and Western Railway (NYS&W) for $2.25 million, and the following year, the Delaware Otsego Corporation (DO), the NYS&W's parent company, assumed full control of the TP&W. Fuller became an executive vice president with DO to continue operating the TP&W.

Under DO ownership, the TP&W began to serve as a western terminus for the NYS&W's own intermodal operations out of the New York City area. The TP&W's headquarters were relocated to DO's headquarters in Cooperstown, New York, where DO dispatched all of their subsidiaries. Nine of the TP&W's GP20s were rebuilt and repainted in the NYS&W's yellow-and-black paint scheme, and some of them were often transferred to operate for the NYS&W. By 1998, the TP&W reportedly turned a revenue profit of $13.4 million and hauled over 59,000 freight and intermodal trains.

During that time, the NYS&W experienced some financial losses, since their intermodal traffic was on a decline. In 1997, when it was announced that Conrail would be split between CSX and Norfolk Southern (NS), DO president and CEO Walter Rich explored ways to aid his fellow stockholders' demands. Rich subsequently arranged to jointly purchase the majority of DO's shares with CSX and NS. In August 1999, DO sold the TP&W to RailAmerica for $24 million.

On February 11, 2005, the KJRY, which by then was a subsidiary of Pioneer Railcorp, completed their acquisition of the west end of the TP&W's line between La Harpe and Peoria, adding 76 miles (122 km) to the KJRY's network. By 2010, the TP&W's traffic primarily consisted of agricultural products, including raw and processed grain products, chemical products, and completed tractors, but they were no longer operating intermodal trains. In December 2012, Genesee & Wyoming Inc. (G&W) acquired RailAmerica, gaining ownership of the TP&W, and they began repainting all of their locomotives in G&W's orange-and-black paint scheme.

== Accidents and incidents ==
- On August 10, 1887, a TP&W excursion passenger train was involved in the Great Chatsworth train wreck near Chatsworth, Illinois. The train was bound for Niagara Falls, before it derailed at a weakened bridge, and 80 people were killed.
- On February 2, 1965, a westbound TP&W freight, no. 23, struck a semi truck at the US Route 66 grade crossing in Chenoa, IL and derailed, resulting in catastrophic damage to Alco C424s 801 and 800.
- On June 21, 1970, an eastbound TP&W freight train No. 20 derailed mid-train in Crescent City, Illinois. One of the tank cars punctured, with the released propane igniting and engulfing the other tank cars. The majority of the business district and several homes were destroyed, while 64 people were injured.

== See also ==
- Bloomer Shippers Connecting Railroad
- Central Railroad of Indianapolis
- Chicago and Eastern Illinois Railroad
- Chicago and Western Indiana Railroad
- Illinois and Midland Railroad
- Kankakee, Beaverville and Southern Railroad

== Bibliography ==
- Ottesen, Mark (March 1997). "The new Toledo, Peoria & Western". Trains. Vol. 57, no. 3. Kalmbach Publishing. pp. 56–61.
