= Iowa Traction Railway =

Electric railroad in Iowa

Coordinates: 43.135°N 93.280°W

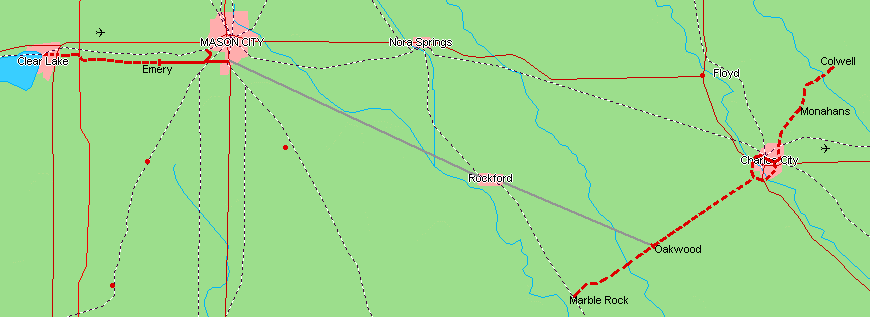
- Network of the IATR and its predecessors

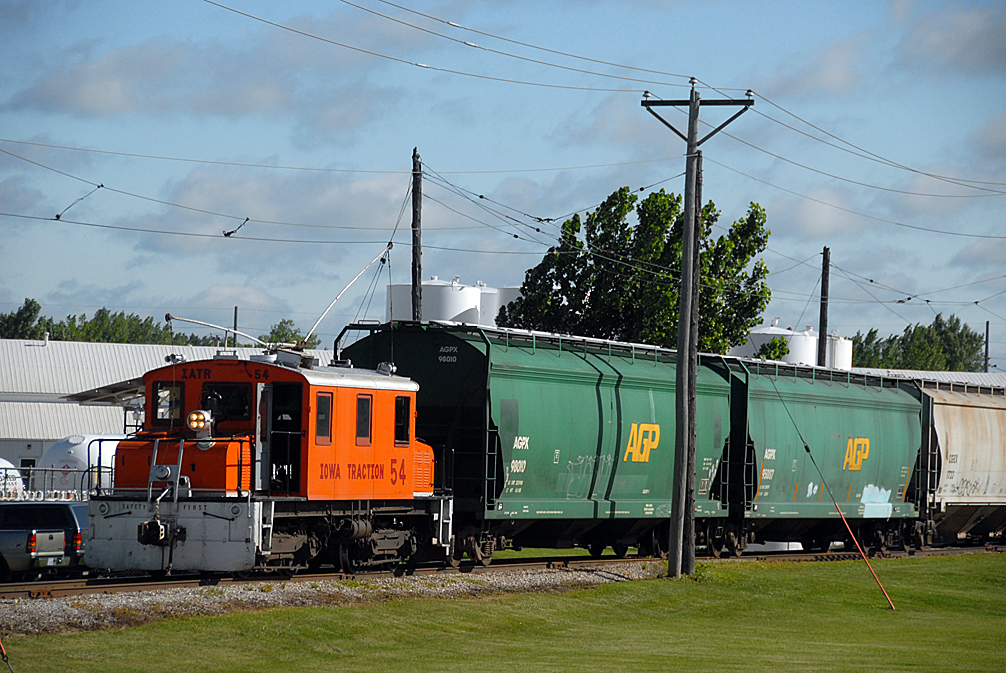
- IATR #54 hauling a train in 2009.

Overview
- Headquarters: Mason City, Iowa
- Reporting mark: IATR
- Dates of operation: 1897–

Technical
- Track gauge: 4 ft 8 1/2 in (1,435 mm) standard gauge
- Electrification: Overhead line, 600 V DC

Other

The Iowa Traction Railway Company (reporting mark IATR), formerly the Iowa Traction Railroad Company, is a class III shortline railroad operating in the United States as a common carrier. It was originally founded in 1896 as the Mason City and Clear Lake Traction Company, carrying both passenger and freight. Since 1937, Business has been exclusively freight. The company's main line connects Mason City and Clear Lake, Iowa. The IATR is notable for being one of two remaining non-passenger railroads in the United States to use electric locomotives, the other being the Deseret Power Railway in Utah and Colorado.

== Route ==
The 10.4 miles (16.7 km) IATR extends east–west between the Mason City Transload Center, the railroad's headquarters in Emery (southwest of Mason City) and the city of Clear Lake, where the western section of its tracks terminate immediately east of Interstate 35 (I-35). At its eastern end, the railroad interchanges within the Mason City Transload Center with the almost parallel Canadian Pacific Railway (CP) to its north and with the Union Pacific Railroad (UP) at Clear Lake Junction. The railroad also interchanges with the CP within the Emery Transload Center. However, in 2020, most of the railroad's traffic traveled on only 3.5 miles (5.6 km) of track within Mason City.

== History ==
=== Early history, 1896 to 1960 ===
The IATR can trace its roots back to the Mason City and Clear Lake Traction Company, founded in 1896. The shops were situated in Emery, the midpoint between the two namesake towns. Passenger service began on July 4, 1897. In May of 1908, the name of the company was changed to the Mason City and Clear Lake Railway.

Freight transport has been the major source of the railroad's income since its beginning and has been the only source since the charter for trolley service in Mason City expired August 30, 1936. The company replaced its passenger service with a bus service between Mason City and Clear Lake in January 1937. That service continued until September 1959.

In the summer of 1910, a new corporation was organized and the Railway was renamed the Mason City and Clear Lake Railroad with a perpetual franchise. William E. Brice, local utility magnate and a founder of the railroad, sold his interests to United Light & Railway Company in 1913. The successor of United Light & Railway was liquidated in 1950, and the railroad was sold to a utility executive at that time.

=== 1960 to 1980 ===
The name was changed to Iowa Terminal Railroad on July 1, 1961 when General Motors executive and railroad enthusiast Harold C. Boyer of Detroit acquired the company. Boyer acquired the Charles City Western, a 23-mile (37 km) freight interurban operating between Charles City and a connection with the Rock Island at Marble Rock, on December 31, 1963. Plans to construct a connection between the two divisions were underway when Boyer died in May 1965 and were not pursued further.

Meanwhile, the Mason City Division continued to operate as usual. The failure of several locomotives in the early 1960s led to the company's acquisition in 1963 of three locomotives from a recently abandoned electric interurban railroad, the Kansas City, Kaw Valley and Western Railway. Also in 1963, the Iowa Terminal ended service between Emery and Clear Lake, although the track remained in place.

Two disasters in 1967 and 1968 shaped the future of the Iowa Terminal. First, a fire originating in a neighboring lumberyard on Thanksgiving Day in November 1967 destroyed the carbarn at Emery along with several pieces of rolling stock, the railroad's primary rotary converter, and a large supply of tools and spare parts. Key parts of the system remained intact, however, and electric service resumed about a week later.

In May 1968, a tornado struck Charles City, destroying much of the downtown and severely damaging the Iowa Terminal's overhead wire there. Diesel power was already used to serve the White Farm Equipment tractor plant, which did not allow electrified service inside its foundry. The company therefore decided to dieselize the Charles City Division rather than repair the overhead wire and to transfer the Charles City Division equipment to Mason City.

A new building housing the shop and company headquarters was constructed at Emery during the summer of 1968. The railroad company abandoned the remaining trackage at Charles City several years later.

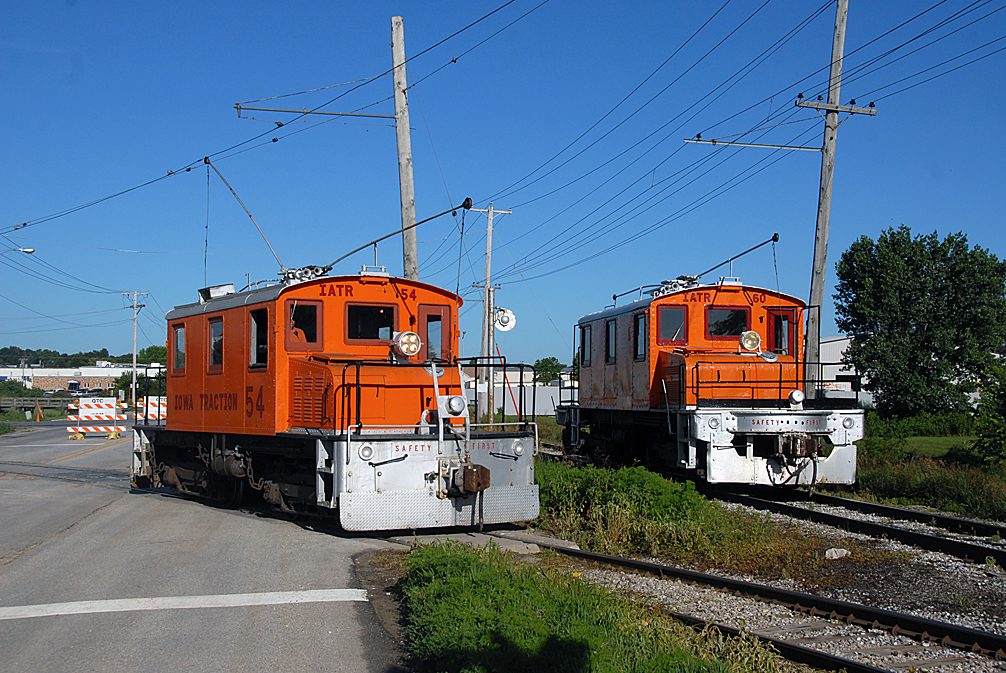
IATR 50 and 54 in Mason City in 2009. These Baldwin/Westinghouse steeple-cab locomotives date back to the 1920s.

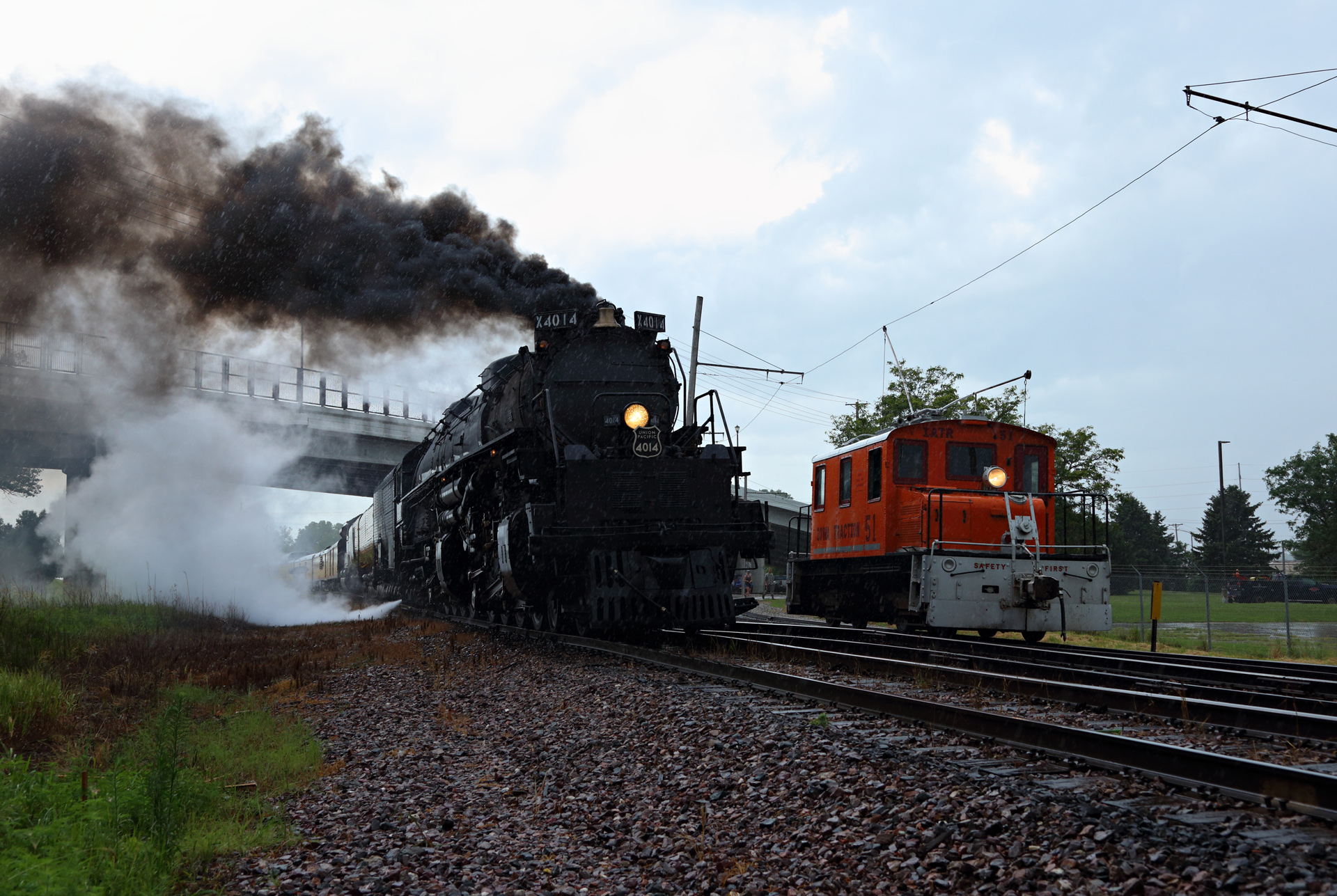
The restored UP 4014 passing IATR 51 at Clear Lake Junction in Mason City during 2019

The Iowa Terminal faced challenges during the 1970s and 1980s from fluctuating traffic patterns, diversion by some customers of traffic from rail to truck, consolidations and bankruptcies involving all of its connecting railroads, and the 1980s farm crisis. All of these events adversely impacted traffic volume and interchange possibilities.

=== 1980 to present ===
In 1980, the Staggers Rail Act provided flexibility that permitted smaller crew sizes and other changes. These helped keep the company viable and competitive.

The Iowa Terminal acquired 75 freight cars in 1980, and more in 1982. These cars enabled the railroad to fill the orders of online shippers when connecting railroads were unable to provide needed cars.

On April 13, 1987, Dave Johnson purchased the Iowa Terminal Railroad and renamed it to Iowa Traction Railroad. During the fall of 2012, Progressive Rail, a shortline holding company based in Lakeville, Minnesota, purchased the Iowa Traction Railroad.

Upon purchase, Progressive Rail renamed the line to Iowa Traction Railway. According to Progressive's President Dave Fellon, "It's [Iowa Traction] right in our wheel house [and] fits our model. It's a great little railroad." Comments by Progressive Rail officials in Trains Magazine indicated that the company planned to continue use of electric locomotives, possibly supplementing them with diesel, and that it was exploring the reopening of the line from Emery to Clear Lake.
