= Willmar and Sioux Falls Railway =

The Willmar and Sioux Falls Railway ran between Sioux Falls, South Dakota, and Willmar, Minnesota. The railroad was built by E. A. Sherman and John M. Spicer of Willmar, under the direction of James J. Hill of the Great Northern Railway. Sherman and Spicer located, named, and platted all of the towns along the line for a distance of 149 miles. The line was sold to the Great Northern Railroad on July 1, 1907.
