= Tama and Toledo Railroad =

Railway line in the United States of America

Overview
- Locale: Iowa
- Dates of operation: 1894–1953

Technical
- Track gauge: 4 ft 8 1/2 in (1,435 mm) standard gauge

The Tama and Toledo Railroad was an interurban and freight railroad that connected its namesake cities of Tama and Toledo, Iowa. It was originally formed in 1893. It survived until 1953 as a freight carrier.

== History ==
The Tama and Toledo Railroad was first formed in 1893 as an interurban providing passenger service between Tama and Toledo, Iowa.

The company replaced its streetcars with buses on June 17, 1925.

The company went out of business on January 31, 1953, citing decreased freight revenues that made profitable operations impossible.

== Preservation ==
A Whitcomb locomotive that formerly operated on the Tama and Toledo was located and brought back to Toledo in 1998, following its purchase by a group of locals. The locomotive was to be restored and then placed on display in Toledo.
