= Lomax, Illinois =

- Village
- Location of Lomax in Henderson County, Illinois.

- Location of Illinois in the United States
- Coordinates: 40°40′45″N 91°04′31″W
- Country: United States
- State: Illinois
- County: Henderson
- Township: Lomax

Government
  - Mayor: Brian Grisham

Area
  - Total: 1.19 sq mi (3.08 km^{2})
  - Land: 1.19 sq mi (3.08 km^{2})
  - Water: 0 sq mi (0.00 km^{2})
- Elevation: 545 ft (166 m)

Population (2020)
  - Total: 404
  - Density: 339.9/sq mi (131.22/km^{2})
- Time zone: UTC-6 (CST)
  - Summer (DST): UTC-5 (CDT)
- ZIP code(s): 61454
- Area code: 217
- FIPS code: 17-44381
- GNIS feature ID: 2398467
- Wikimedia Commons: Lomax, Illinois

Lomax is a village in Henderson County, Illinois, United States. The population was 404 at the 2020 census, a decline from 454 in 2010 census. It is part of the Burlington, IA–IL Micropolitan Statistical Area.

== Geography ==
Lomax is located in southwestern Henderson County. Illinois Route 96 passes through the village, leading east 5 miles (8 km) to Illinois Route 94 north of Terre Haute and southwest 6 miles (10 km) to Dallas City along the Mississippi River.

According to the 2021 census gazetteer files, Lomax has a total area of 1.19 square miles (3.08 km^{2}), all land.

== Demographics ==
Historical population
Census	Pop.	Note	%±
1880	63		—
1920	211		—
1930	410		94.3%
1940	520		26.8%
1950	490		−5.8%
1960	535		9.2%
1970	565		5.6%
1980	601		6.4%
1990	473		−21.3%
2000	477		0.8%
2010	454		−4.8%
2020	404		−11.0%
U.S. Decennial Census

As of the 2020 census there were 404 people, 174 households, and 132 families residing in the village. The population density was 339.78 inhabitants per square mile (131.19/km^{2}). There were 197 housing units at an average density of 165.69 per square mile (63.97/km^{2}). The racial makeup of the village was 95.30% White, 0.00% African American, 0.00% Native American, 0.25% Asian, 0.00% Pacific Islander, 1.73% from other races, and 2.72% from two or more races. Hispanic or Latino of any race were 4.95% of the population.

There were 174 households, out of which 31.6% had children under the age of 18 living with them, 62.07% were married couples living together, 11.49% had a female householder with no husband present, and 24.14% were non-families. 18.97% of all households were made up of individuals, and 6.90% had someone living alone who was 65 years of age or older. The average household size was 2.46 and the average family size was 2.16.

The village's age distribution consisted of 18.9% under the age of 18, 10.1% from 18 to 24, 24% from 25 to 44, 27.2% from 45 to 64, and 19.7% who were 65 years of age or older. The median age was 35.8 years. For every 100 females, there were 83.8 males. For every 100 females age 18 and over, there were 90.0 males.

The median income for a household in the village was $41,250, and the median income for a family was $48,750. Males had a median income of $61,406 versus $21,250 for females. The per capita income for the village was $24,103. About 19.7% of families and 21.6% of the population were below the poverty line, including 62.0% of those under age 18 and none of those age 65 or over.

== Transportation ==
Amtrak’s Southwest Chief, which operates between Los Angeles and Chicago, passes through the town on BNSF tracks, but makes no stop. A station is located in Fort Madison, 15 miles (24 km) to the west. The California Zephyr has a stop located in Burlington, which is 13 miles (21 km) to the north.

== Education ==
Residents are in Dallas Elementary School District 327 and Illini West High School District 307.
