= Hills, Iowa =

- City
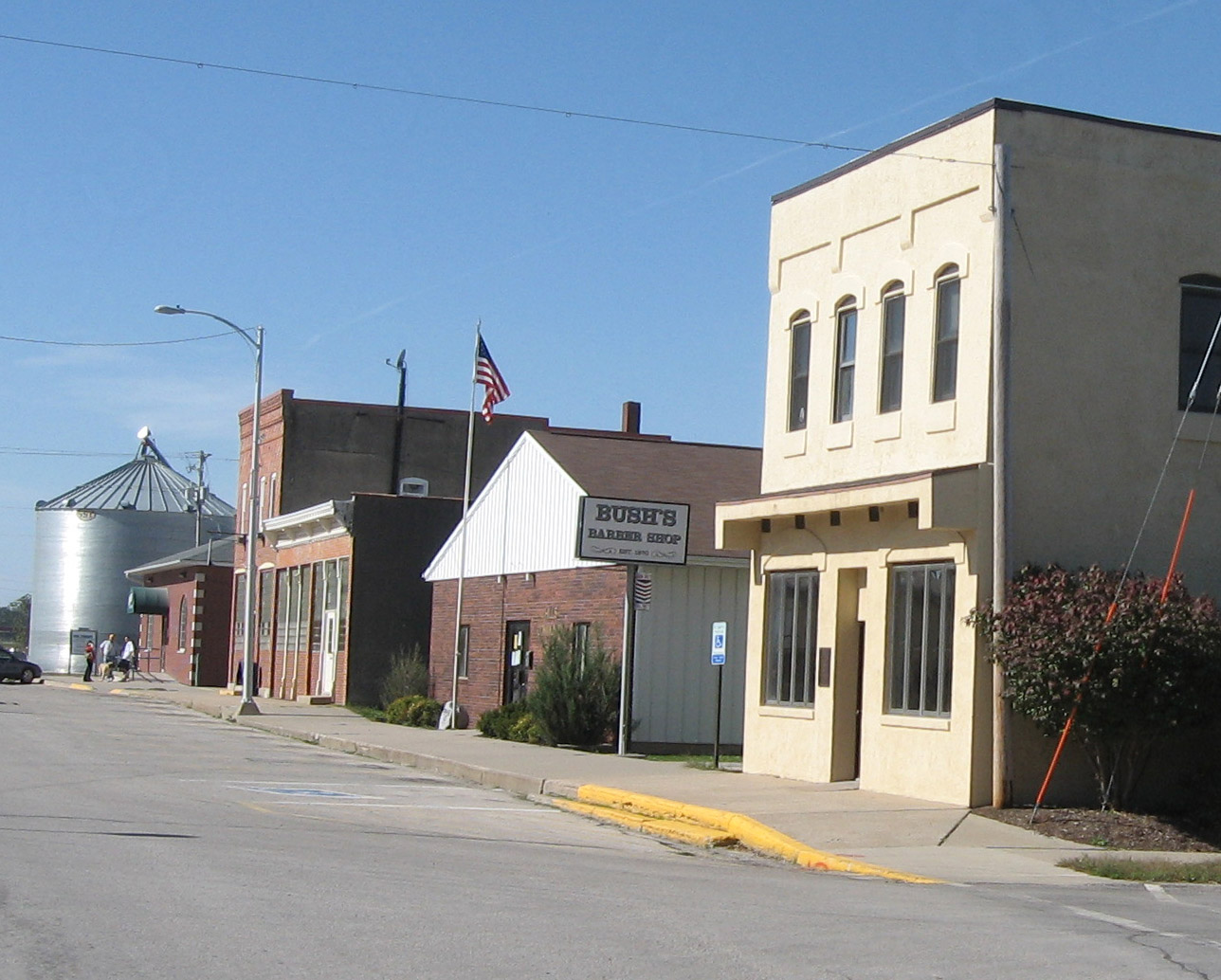
- Buildings on Main Street in downtown Hills
- Motto(s): Where town and country meet
- Location of Hills, Iowa
- Coordinates: 41°33′24″N 91°32′11″W
- Country: United States
- State: Iowa
- County: Johnson
- Incorporated: July 1906

Area
  - Total: 0.82 sq mi (2.12 km^{2})
  - Land: 0.82 sq mi (2.12 km^{2})
  - Water: 0 sq mi (0.00 km^{2})
- Elevation: 633 ft (193 m)

Population (2020)
  - Total: 863
  - Density: 1,052.9/sq mi (406.51/km^{2})
- Time zone: UTC-6 (Central (CST))
  - Summer (DST): UTC-5 (CDT)
- ZIP code: 52235
- Area code: 319
- FIPS code: 19-36345
- GNIS feature ID: 2394384
- Website: hills-ia.org

Hills is a city in Johnson County, Iowa, United States. It is part of the Iowa City, Iowa Metropolitan Statistical Area. The population was 863 at the time of the 2020 census. It is part of the Iowa City Community School District.

== Geography ==
According to the United States Census Bureau, the city has a total area of 0.63 square miles (1.63 km^{2}), all land.

== Demographics ==
Historical populations
Year	Pop.	±%
1910	195	—
1920	231	+18.5%
1930	211	−8.7%
1940	232	+10.0%
1950	248	+6.9%
1960	310	+25.0%
1970	507	+63.5%
1980	547	+7.9%
1990	662	+21.0%
2000	679	+2.6%
2010	703	+3.5%
2020	863	+22.8%
Source:"U.S. Census website". United States Census Bureau. and Iowa Data Center; Source: U.S. Decennial Census

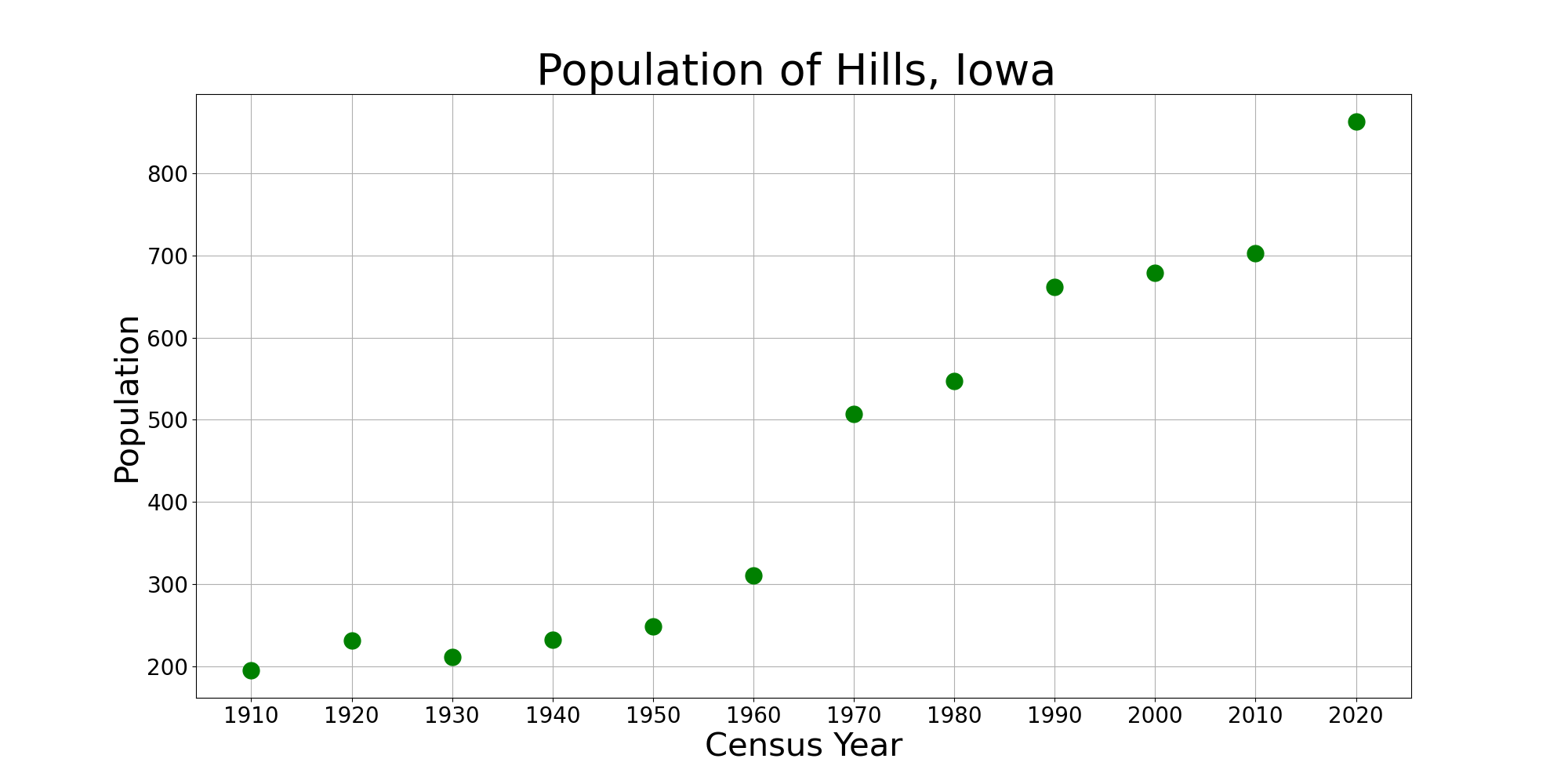
The population of Hills, Iowa from US census data

=== 2020 census ===
As of the census of 2020, there were 863 people, 403 households, and 244 families residing in the city. The population density was 1,151.5 inhabitants per square mile (444.6/km^{2}). There were 422 housing units at an average density of 563.1 per square mile (217.4/km^{2}). The racial makeup of the city was 87.3% White, 5.0% Black or African American, 0.0% Native American, 0.7% Asian, 0.0% Pacific Islander, 1.6% from other races and 5.4% from two or more races. Hispanic or Latino persons of any race comprised 5.8% of the population.

Of the 403 households, 25.3% of which had children under the age of 18 living with them, 43.7% were married couples living together, 10.4% were cohabitating couples, 22.6% had a female householder with no spouse or partner present and 23.3% had a male householder with no spouse or partner present. 39.5% of all households were non-families. 29.0% of all households were made up of individuals, 10.7% had someone living alone who was 65 years old or older.

The median age in the city was 41.6 years. 21.4% of the residents were under the age of 20; 4.8% were between the ages of 20 and 24; 28.3% were from 25 and 44; 25.1% were from 45 and 64; and 20.4% were 65 years of age or older. The gender makeup of the city was 49.4% male and 50.6% female.

=== 2010 census ===
As of the census of 2010, there were 703 people, 299 households, and 190 families living in the city. The population density was 1,115.9 inhabitants per square mile (430.9/km^{2}). There were 349 housing units at an average density of 554.0 per square mile (213.9/km^{2}). The racial makeup of the city was 93.3% White, 0.3% African American, 0.7% Native American, 1.3% Asian, 1.6% from other races, and 2.8% from two or more races. Hispanic or Latino of any race were 4.0% of the population.

There were 299 households, of which 26.8% had children under the age of 18 living with them, 52.2% were married couples living together, 7.4% had a female householder with no husband present, 4.0% had a male householder with no wife present, and 36.5% were non-families. 30.8% of all households were made up of individuals, and 15.7% had someone living alone who was 65 years of age or older. The average household size was 2.22 and the average family size was 2.73.

The median age in the city was 45.2 years. 20.2% of residents were under the age of 18; 6.2% were between the ages of 18 and 24; 23.3% were from 25 to 44; 30.5% were from 45 to 64; and 19.8% were 65 years of age or older. The gender makeup of the city was 47.1% male and 52.9% female.

=== 2000 census ===
As of the census of 2000, there were 679 people, 250 households, and 172 families living in the city. The population density was 1,140.9 inhabitants per square mile (440.5/km^{2}). There were 257 housing units at an average density of 431.8 per square mile (166.7/km^{2}). The racial makeup of the city was 96.91% White, 0.44% African American, 1.03% Asian, 1.18% from other races, and 0.44% from two or more races. Hispanic or Latino of any race were 1.18% of the population.

There were 250 households, out of which 32.8% had children under the age of 18 living with them, 57.6% were married couples living together, 6.8% had a female householder with no husband present, and 31.2% were non-families. 22.8% of all households were made up of individuals, and 8.4% had someone living alone who was 65 years of age or older. The average household size was 2.52 and the average family size was 2.95.

24.0% are under the age of 18, 9.3% from 18 to 24, 29.9% from 25 to 44, 20.6% from 45 to 64, and 16.2% who were 65 years of age or older. The median age was 37 years. For every 100 females, there were 102.1 males. For every 100 females age 18 and over, there were 96.2 males.

The median income for a household in the city was $51,477, and the median income for a family was $57,386. Males had a median income of $36,429 versus $29,500 for females. The per capita income for the city was $21,918. About 5.0% of families and 6.7% of the population were below the poverty line, including 9.5% of those under age 18 and 3.6% of those age 65 or over.
