= Peoria and Pekin Union Railway =

Railway in central Illinois, USA

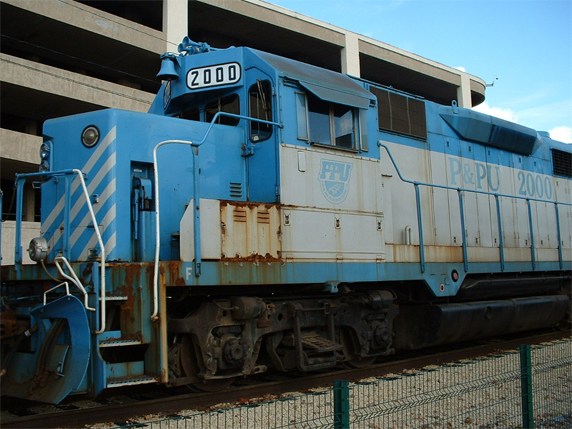
PPU 2000 in downtown Peoria, Illinois. In the background is a parking deck for the headquarters of Caterpillar Inc.

The Peoria and Pekin Union Railway (reporting mark PPU) is a switching and terminal railroad in Illinois that began operating in 1881 and they opened a roadhouse in 1882.

== History ==
The railway managed hourly passenger travel, but ridership declined during the Great Depression and service was suspended on 7 November 1931.

The railway was leased to the Tazewell and Peoria Railroad in 2004. Its main yard and roundhouse are in East Peoria, Illinois, and it owns track on both sides of the Illinois River. The company also owns a rail bridge over the river.

Most railways are regional and do not own track all the way across the nation, so their lines end at some point. Since the late 19th century, many railways have chosen to end their lines near Peoria, Illinois. When a train car reaches the end of one rail line, it must be switched to a different line in order to continue on to its destination. P&PU engines are responsible for picking up the cars at the end of other railways' lines and bringing them back to the main yard in East Peoria. Employees then sort the cars based on which railway will take them to their next stop. After these new trains have been formed, P&PU engines take the cars to the beginning of that rail line where they will continue their journey. That company's engines then pick up the cars and take them to their destination.

By 1944, the P&PU was switching 14 major railways that ran into Peoria, an unusually high number of railways for a city the size of Peoria. The P&PU currently switches trains for 8 other railways, handles over 170,000 cars per year, and is owned jointly by the Canadian National Railway, Norfolk Southern Railway, and Union Pacific Railroad.
