= List of Lima-Hamilton diesel locomotives =

The following is a list of Lima-Hamilton locomotives built between 1949 and 1951. Lima-Hamilton never gave its locomotives model numbers in the ordinary sense. L-H only used specification numbers for its diesel models. Model designations such as LS-750 or LT-2500 were a railfan invention.

== Switchers ==
Model	Specification number	Build year	Total produced	Wheel arrangement	Prime mover	Power output	Image
LS-750	A-3149	1950–1951	6	B-B	Hamilton; T69SA	750 hp (560 kW)	
LS-800	A-3171	1950	23	B-B	Hamilton; T69SA	800 hp (600 kW)	
LS-1000	A-3080	1949–1950	38	B-B	Hamilton; T89SA	1,000 hp (750 kW)	
LS-1200	A-3170	1950–1951	69	B-B	Hamilton; T89SA	1,200 hp (890 kW)	

== Roadswitcher ==
Model	Specification number	Build year	Total produced	Wheel arrangement	Prime mover	Power output	Image
LRS-1200	A-3174	1950	16	B-B	Hamilton T89SA	1,200 hp (895 kW)	

== Transfer unit ==
Model	Specification number	Build year	Total produced	Wheel arrangement	Prime mover	Power output	Image
LT-2500	A-3177	1950–1951	22	C-C	Hamilton; T89SA (×2)	2,500 hp (1,860 kW)	
