= Baldwin RS-12 =

Class of American diesel-electric locomotives

RS-12
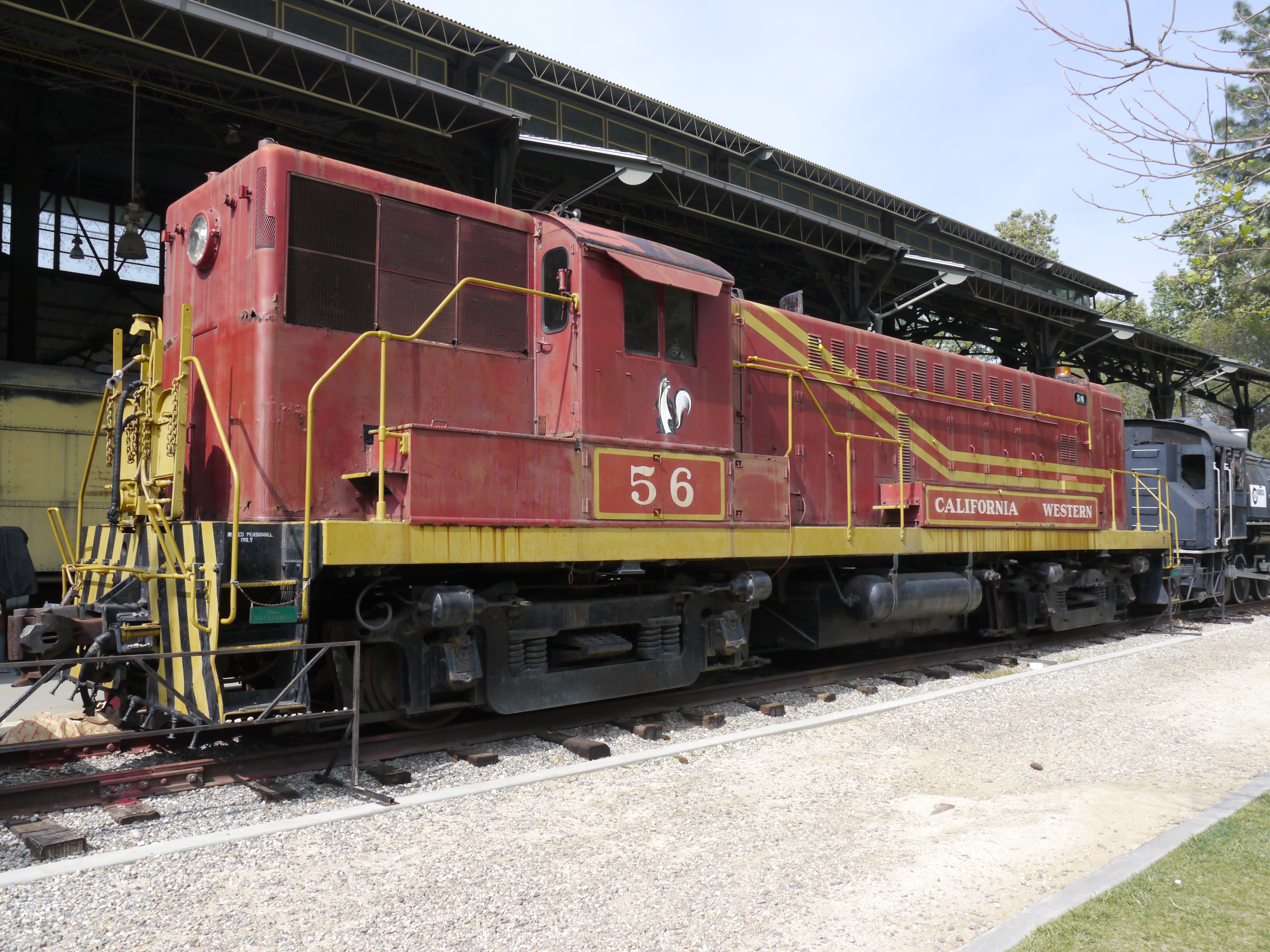
- A preserved RS-12 at the Travel Town Museum.
Type and origin
- Power type: Diesel-electric
- Builder: Baldwin-Lima-Hamilton Corporation
- Model: RS-12
- Build date: April 1951–May 1956
- Total produced: 50
Specifications
- Configuration
  - AAR: B-B
  - UIC: Bo′Bo′
- Gauge: 4 ft 8 1/2 in (1,435 mm)
- Trucks: AAR Type B
- Length: 58 ft 6 in (17.83 m)
- Width: 10 ft (3.0 m)
- Height: 14 ft (4.3 m)
- Loco weight: 232,000 lb (105,000 kg)
- Fuel capacity: 900 US gal (3,400 L; 750 imp gal)
- Lubricant cap.: 160 US gal (610 L; 130 imp gal)
- Coolant cap.: 250 US gal (950 L; 210 imp gal)
- Sandbox cap.: 30 cu ft (0.85 m^{3})
- Prime mover: 606A
- Engine type: Four-stroke diesel
- Aspiration: Turbocharger Elliott Company H503 (215 hp)
- Displacement: 11,874 cu in (195 L)
- Generator: Westinghouse YG42B
- Traction motors: Westinghouse 362DF (4)
- Cylinders: In-line 6
- Cylinder size: 12 3/4 in × 15 1/2 in (324 mm × 394 mm)
- Transmission: Electric
- Loco brake: Straight air
- Train brakes: Air 6-SL, or 24-RL
Performance figures
- Maximum speed: 18:74 gear ratio: 65 mph (105 km/h); 18:65 gear ratio: 75 mph (121 km/h)
- Power output: 1,200 hp (895 kW)
Career
- Preserved: 2
- Disposition: 2 preserved. 6 scrapped in 2026

The BLH RS-12 was a class of 1,200 hp (895 kW) diesel-electric road switcher locomotives configured with an AAR type B-B wheel arrangement. It was the follow-on model to the former Baldwin DRS-4-4-1000, first introduced in 1948. It was more successful than its predecessor selling 50 units to eight railroads, versus 22 units to three railroads. Only one railroad, The Pennsylvania Railroad bought both models.

When Baldwin Locomotive Works merged with Lima-Hamilton Corporation, forming the Baldwin-Lima-Hamilton Corporation and decided to concentrate locomotive production at Baldwin's Eddystone, Pennsylvania plant. There was still one outstanding order for Lima A-3174s but the customer, New York Central Railroad agreed to receive RS-12s instead.

The locomotive could be ordered with either a steam generator for steam heat, or dynamic brakes contained within the short hood. McCloud River Railroad No. 32 and 33 were the only two ordered with dynamic brakes of the fifty units built. One RS-12 is preserved in operational condition in the "Skunk Train" livery of California Western 56 (Locomotive) at Travel Town Museum in Griffith Park; another #300 is owned by and occasionally used on the Escanaba and Lake Superior Railroad, with others owned by the same railroad held in non-operational condition.

Escanaba and Lake Superior 207 was leased to the Nicolet Badger Northern Railroad for a short time in the 1990s and was later returned to the Escanaba and Lake Superior where it now remains in storage in Wells, Michigan.

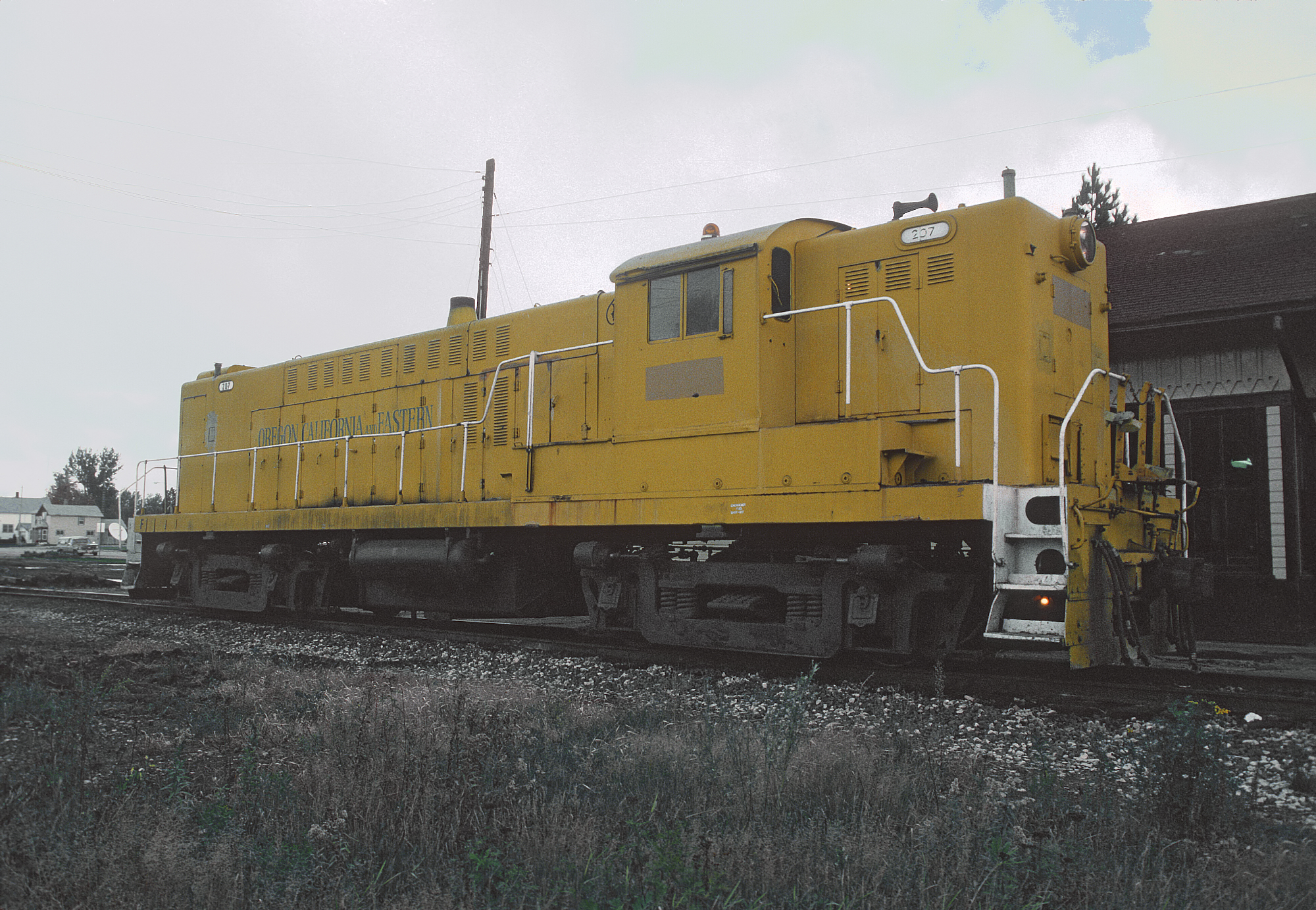
Escanaba and Lake Superior Railroad 207 at Channing, MI on October 5, 1988 (22338370013)

Escanaba and Lake Superior 209 was used for ballast and general freight until the late 1980s when it was put in storage.

Escanaba and Lake Superior 212 started to be rebuilt in the 1980s but the rebuilt was never completed. It remains in storage along with other E&LS Baldwins at Wells, Michigan.

== Original buyers ==
Railroad	Image	Quantity	Road numbers	Notes
	Central Railroad of New Jersey	4	1206–1209	
	Chicago, Milwaukee, St. Paul and Pacific Railroad (“Milwaukee Road”)	2	970–971	Renumbered 926–927
	Durham and Southern Railway	3	1200–1202	
	Kaiser Bauxite Company	4	101–104	104 last RS-12 built
	McCloud River Railroad	2	32–33	to California Western 55– 56
	New York Central Railroad	17	5820–5836	Equipped with steam generators, Renumbered 6220–6236. to Penn Central #8067-8083 in 1968
	Pennsylvania Railroad	8	8105–8110, 8776, 8975	to Penn Central #8084-8091 in 1968
	Seaboard Air Line Railroad	10	1466–1475	to Seaboard Coast Line Railroad 207–216 1466 1468 1469 1470 1471 1472 1473 1474 was scrapped june 2026 by Escanaba and Lake Superior Railroad
	Total	50		

== Bibliography ==
- Kirkland, John F. (November 1985). The Diesel Builders Volume 1: Fairbanks-Morse and Lima-Hamilton. Interurban Press. ISBN 0-916374-69-6.
- Kirkland, John F. (November 1994). The Diesel Builders volume 3: Baldwin Locomotive Works. Interurban Press. ISBN 0-916374-93-9.
- Diesel Engine Manual DE-111 for 600 series engines, Manual DE-111. Baldwin Lima Hamilton Corp. June 1951.
- Operator's Manual for Standard 1200-HP Diesel Electric Switching Locomotives, Manual S-120. Baldwin Lima Hamilton Corp. March 1956.
