= Whitewater Valley Railroad =

Heritage railroad in Indiana

Coordinates: 39°38′29.7″N 85°8′26.8″W

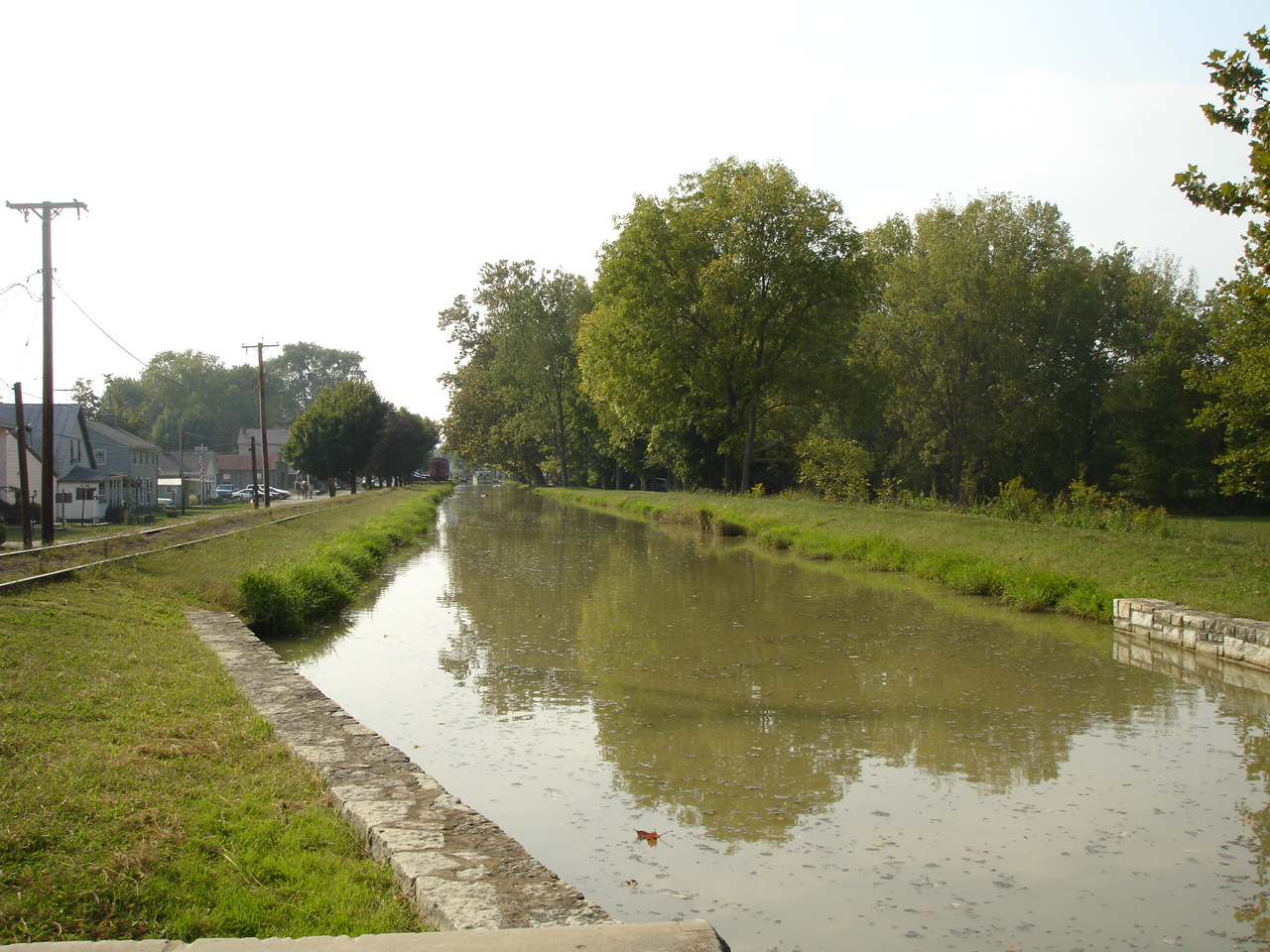
- Whitewater Canal with railroad and train visible near Metamora, Indiana

Overview
- Headquarters: Connersville, Indiana
- Reporting mark: WVRR
- Locale: Indiana
- Dates of operation: 1974–present

Technical
- Track gauge: 4 ft 8 1/2 in (1,435 mm) standard gauge
- Length: 19 mi (31 km)

Other
- Website: https://whitewatervalleyrr.org/

The Whitewater Valley Railroad is an American heritage railroad in southeastern Indiana between Connersville and Metamora.

The railroad is dedicated to the preservation and presentation of a 1950s era of branch line railroading. It is now operated by vintage diesel switchers and road switchers during most of the year. Steam operations vary from year to year. The most recent steam locomotive donated to the organization is New York Central B-10W 0-6-0 #6894. It is nearly identical to the last steam engines operated on the line.

== History ==
The Whitewater River formed a natural trade route for Native Americans and for early settlers. In 1836 the new state of Indiana approved funds to build the Whitewater Canal, following the river from Lawrenceburg, Indiana, all the way to Hagerstown, Indiana, 76 miles (122 km). It was opened to Connersville, Indiana, in 1845. While improving trade for the area, it suffered from alternate droughts and floods, which carried away aqueducts and embankments. It was so damaged by floods in the later 1850s that residents petitioned the state to sell the right of way for a railroad.

In 1863, the Indianapolis and Cincinnati Railroad (I&C) acquired the right to build on the old towpath, although many portions of the canal remained open as a source of water power for mills such as the one still operating in Metamora. The canal remained open in Connersville until 1953, when Western Avenue was built over the top of it.

After the I&C purchased the canal right-of-way, its subsidiary, the White Water Valley Railroad (WVRR), reached Connersville in the spring of 1867, and continued on to Hagerstown in 1868. The WWVRR connected with the I&C main line at Valley Junction, 17 miles (27 km) west of Cincinnati, and ran trains into Cincinnati over that line.

Initially operated by the I&C, the WVRR operated independently for several years. In 1890 the WVRR was absorbed by the growing *Big Four* - the Cleveland, Cincinnati, Chicago & St. Louis. The Big Four (later the New York Central Railroad or NYC) operated commuter trains from Connersville and from Harrison, Ohio, into Cincinnati, and briefly operated through trains and parlor cars from Cincinnati to Fort Wayne, changing at Connersville to the tracks of the Lake Erie and Western Railroad.

The little used section between Connersville and Hagerstown was abandoned by the NYC in 1931, with all passenger service ended in 1933, and the track removed from this section in 1936. Local freight continued behind steam locomotives until 1957, and behind diesel locomotives until discontinued by the NYC's successor, the Penn Central Railroad in 1972.

The formation of Conrail in 1976 saw that company provide rail service in Connersville; however the line was disconnected from the rest of the Conrail system.

The line between Metamora and Connersville was sold to the non-profit Whitewater Valley Railroad in 1984, although freight operation from Brookville to Valley Junction was taken over in 1979 by the Indiana and Ohio Railway. Freight service was abandoned on the Whitewater line between Brookville and Connersville in 1974. The portion of the remaining NYC branch between Connersville and Beeson's Station was sold to Indiana Hi-Rail Corporation in 1981.

In August 2026, flooding along the Whitewater River severely damaged the railroad. The railroad suspended all operations, and recovery efforts are currently ongoing.

== Present operation ==
The present Whitewater Valley Railroad was formed as a not-for-profit corporation in 1972, and began weekend passenger operations in 1974 on 25 miles (40 km) of leased Penn Central track between Connersville and Brookville. After a substantial washout closed the track between Metamora and Brookville in 1974, the Penn Central lifted 4 miles (6.4 km) of track in 1976.

The remaining 18 miles (29 km) of line from Connersville through Metamora were formally purchased by the Whitewater Valley in 1983, followed later by an additional 1-mile (1.6 km) of track in Connersville that was no longer wanted by the Indiana Hi-Rail Corporation.

Operation of the heritage railroad has always been conducted entirely by volunteers, supplemented by a paid office manager. Track upgrading has been assisted by matching grants, totaling over $1.6 million since 1994. The railroad museum has rescued two historic railroad structures from the region including Dearborn Tower (NYC - B&O) from Lawrenceburg, Indiana, as well as the B&O Rushville, Indiana, passenger depot. These buildings are located on the south end of the Connersville Yard. The railroad proposes to install a turntable and roundhouse shelter to protect locomotives and other equipment from the weather in this general location along with providing space for other historic buildings. In 2012 the railroad constructed a 150 by 60 feet (46 m × 18 m)' restoration shop on the north end of the Connersville Yard.

The railroad operates passenger excursion trains pulled by historic diesel locomotives and open window Erie, New York Central, and Rock Island coaches on a regular schedule. These trains often include a caboose from the museum's collection. One route, the Valley Flyer, operates from Connersville to Metamora, while another operates as the Metamora Local, carrying passengers south on a 2-mile (3.2 km) excursion along the restored canal, past the canal boat dock, a working aqueduct, and a restored lock. This train consist usually includes at least one caboose and a coach. During winter operations, trains operate with steam heat provided by a generator car formerly used by Via Rail.

All operations are currently suspended due to the extensive flooding in August 2026.

=== Current roster ===
Photograph	Number	Railroad	Builder	Type	Date	Operational status
	1	USN 1	GE	GE 65-ton switcher	1942	Operational
	6	East Broad Top Railroad and Coal Company	Baldwin Locomotive Works	standard gauge 0-6-0 Switcher	02-1907	Stored
	8	Muncie and Western Railroad	GE	GE 70-ton switcher	12-1946	Static Cosmetically restored
	11	Southwestern Portland Cement	Vulcan Iron Works	Vulcan 0-4-0T	12-1924	Stored
	25	Cincinnati Union Terminal	Lima Locomotive Works	LS-750	06-1951	Operational
	99	Amherst Industries originally Baldwin demonstrator DF-100	Baldwin Locomotive Works	Baldwin DS-4-4-1000	1949	Static
	210	Calumet & Hecla Copper	GE	GE 70-ton switcher	12-1946	Stored
	320	Baltimore & Ohio	Lima	Lima LS-1200	12-1950	Static
	346	Patapsco & Back Rivers Railroad	Baldwin	Baldwin S-12	09-1951	Static
	532	Milwaukee Road	Electro-Motive Diesel	EMD SD10, upgraded from EMD SD9 in October, 1975. See roster listing here.	02-1954	Operational
	709	Armco Steel Corporation	Lima	Lima LS-1000	03-1950	Operational
	2561	France Stone Company	Plymouth Locomotive Works	ML-6	01-1930	Stored
	6894	New York Central Railroad / Michigan Central Railroad	American Locomotive Company Pittsburgh Works	NYC B-10W 0-6-0 Switcher	1912	Static
	9339	Procter & Gamble #9 painted as NYC #9339	American Locomotive Company	ALCO S-1	1-1948	Operational

=== Former locomotives ===
Photograph	Number	Railroad	Builder	Type	Date
	100	Escambia Railway	Baldwin	2-6-2	1919
	509	Louisiana & Arkansas Railway	Baldwin	4-6-0	1913

== Current excursions ==
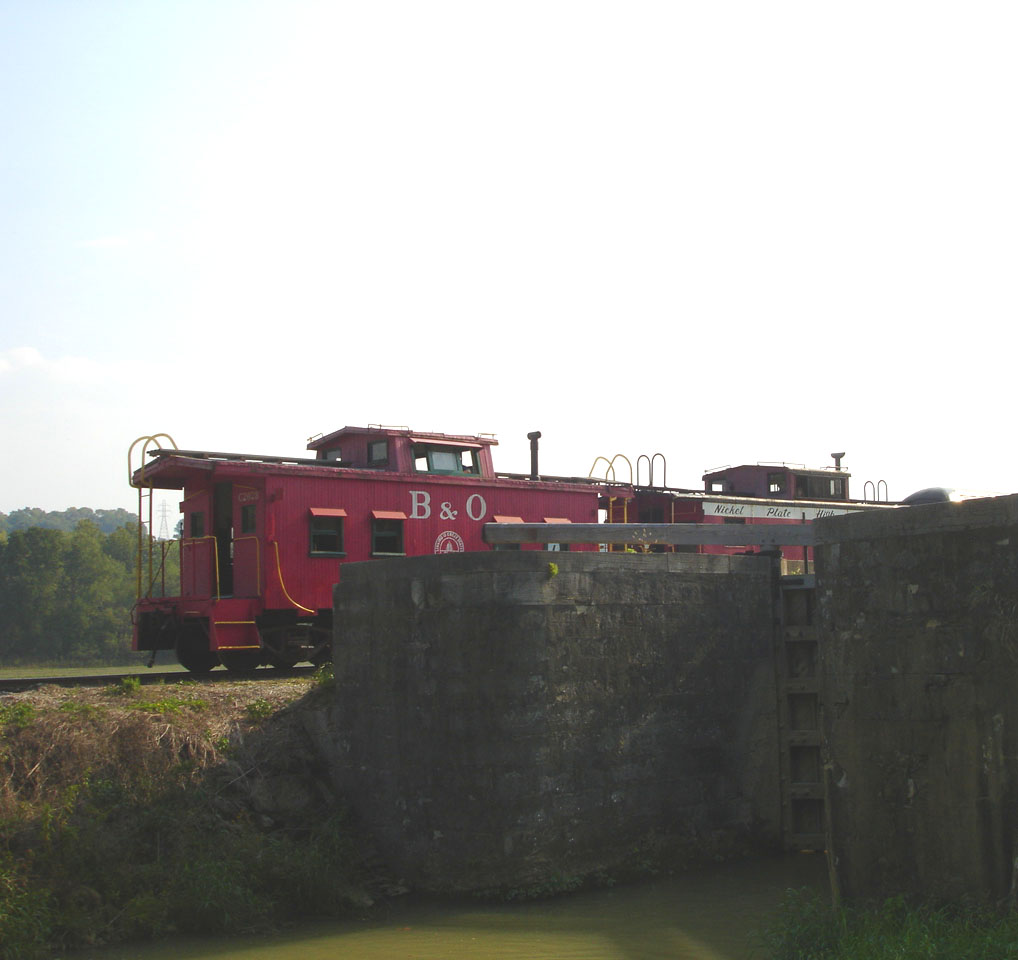
Train along the Whitewater Canal

- Easter Bunny Train
- Valley Flyer (Connersville, IN to Metamora, IN and return)
- Metamora Shuttle
- Wild West Special
- Pumpkin Train
- Fall Excursions
- Train to Dinner
- 4 July Train
- Santa Trains
- The Polar Express (November to December)

== See also ==
- List of heritage railroads in the United States
- Whitewater Canal
