= 3080 =

3080 may refer to:

- 3080, a number in the 3000 (number) range
- AD 3080, a year of the 4th millennium CE
- 3080 BC, a year in the 4th millennium BCE

== Roads numbered 3080 ==
- Hawaii Route 3080, a state highway
- Kentucky Route 3080, a state highway
- Texas Farm to Market Road 3080, a state highway
- A3080, one of the A roads in Zone 3 of the Great Britain numbering scheme

== Other uses ==
- 3080 Moisseiev, an asteroid in the Asteroid Belt, the 3080th asteroid registered

=== Computers ===
- IBM 3080 series, a mainframe computer
- HT 3080C, a microcomputer
- The RTX 3080 graphics card

== See also ==
- Lima Hamilton A-3080, a diesel locomotive
