= 2026 Indiana floods =

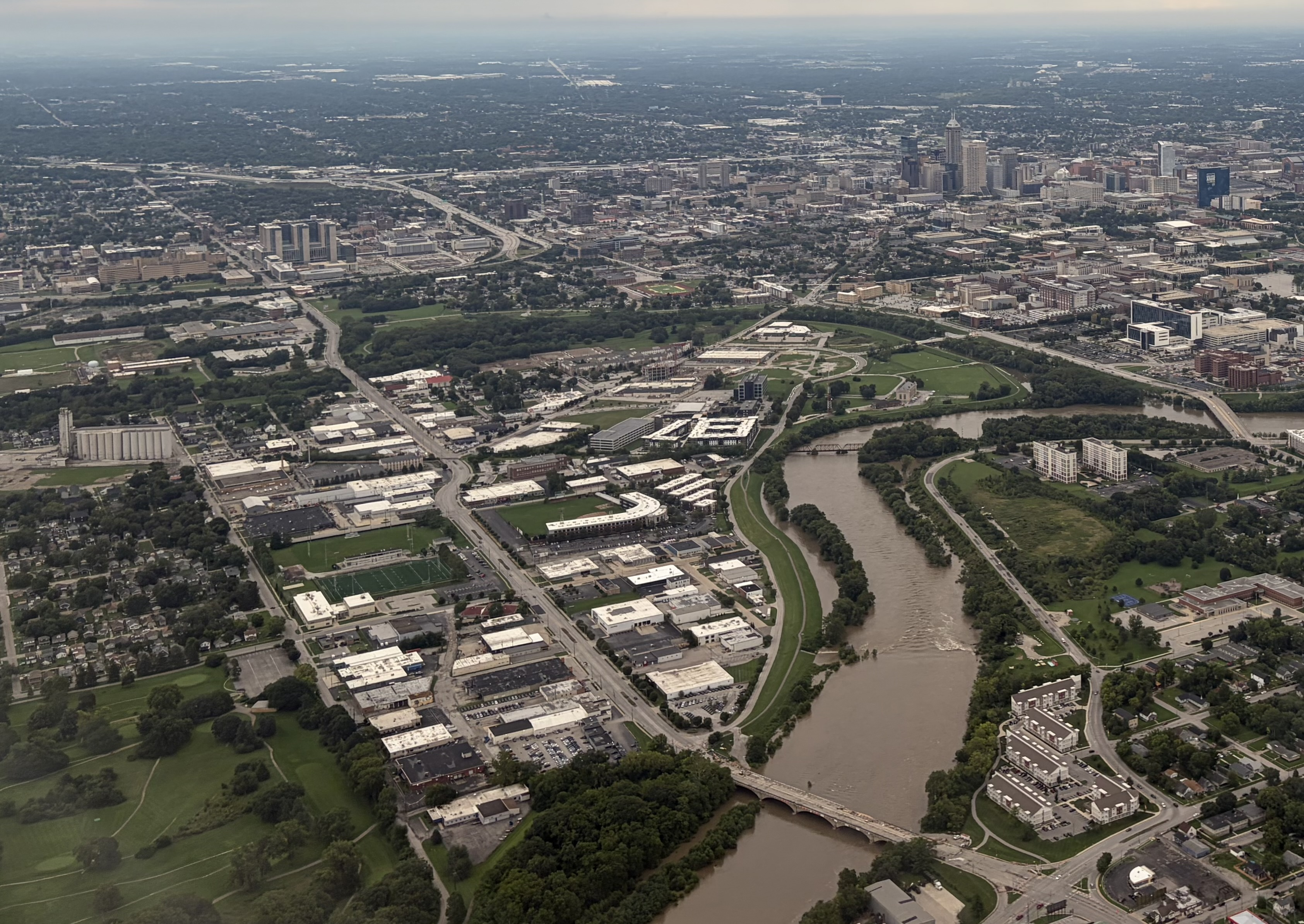
- Aerial of swollen White River in Indianapolis, August 15, 2026
- Date: August 11 – 17
- Location: Midwestern United States, especially Central and Southern Indiana
- Type: Flood (incl. flash flooding); Derecho (August 11)
- Deaths: 7+

Beginning on August 11, 2026, the state of Indiana was impacted by several rounds of thunderstorms and heavy rainfall, resulting in widespread and historic flooding across the central and southern portions of the state, as well as in adjacent areas of Ohio and Kentucky. The flooding has left at least 7 dead in Indiana and prompted a statewide disaster proclamation from Indiana Governor Mike Braun.

== Meteorological history ==
A frontal boundary stalled over the Midwest and was unable to move due to a heat dome in the southern United States. In the Gulf, a high pressure system brought moisture to the stalled front and fueling storms. On August 11, a derecho developed at about 12:00 UTC over eastern Iowa and lasted until at least 17:25 UTC over Indiana. After rounds of thunderstorms, the Weather Prediction Center begin issuing storm summaries at 03:00 UTC on August 12. That day, a squall line brought heavy rainfall to the area, causing major river flooding in Indiana. The stationary front continued to produce rounds of showers and thunderstorms due to its interaction with waves of energy at the top of the high pressure ridge to the south of the front. Beginning on August 16, precipitation came to an end as a cold front began to move over Midwest. At 15:00 UTC on August 17, the Weather Prediction Center issued its last summary as the cold front swept through the Midwest and Ohio Valley.

== Impact ==
Over a million customers lost power due to the derecho on August 11. Some areas including Gary, Indiana, which clocked a 99 mph (159 km/h) wind gust remained without power for more than nine days, with 68,000 customers in Lake County, Indiana out of power on Thursday, August 20, and some customers expected to remain without power until Tuesday, August 25.

=== Indiana ===
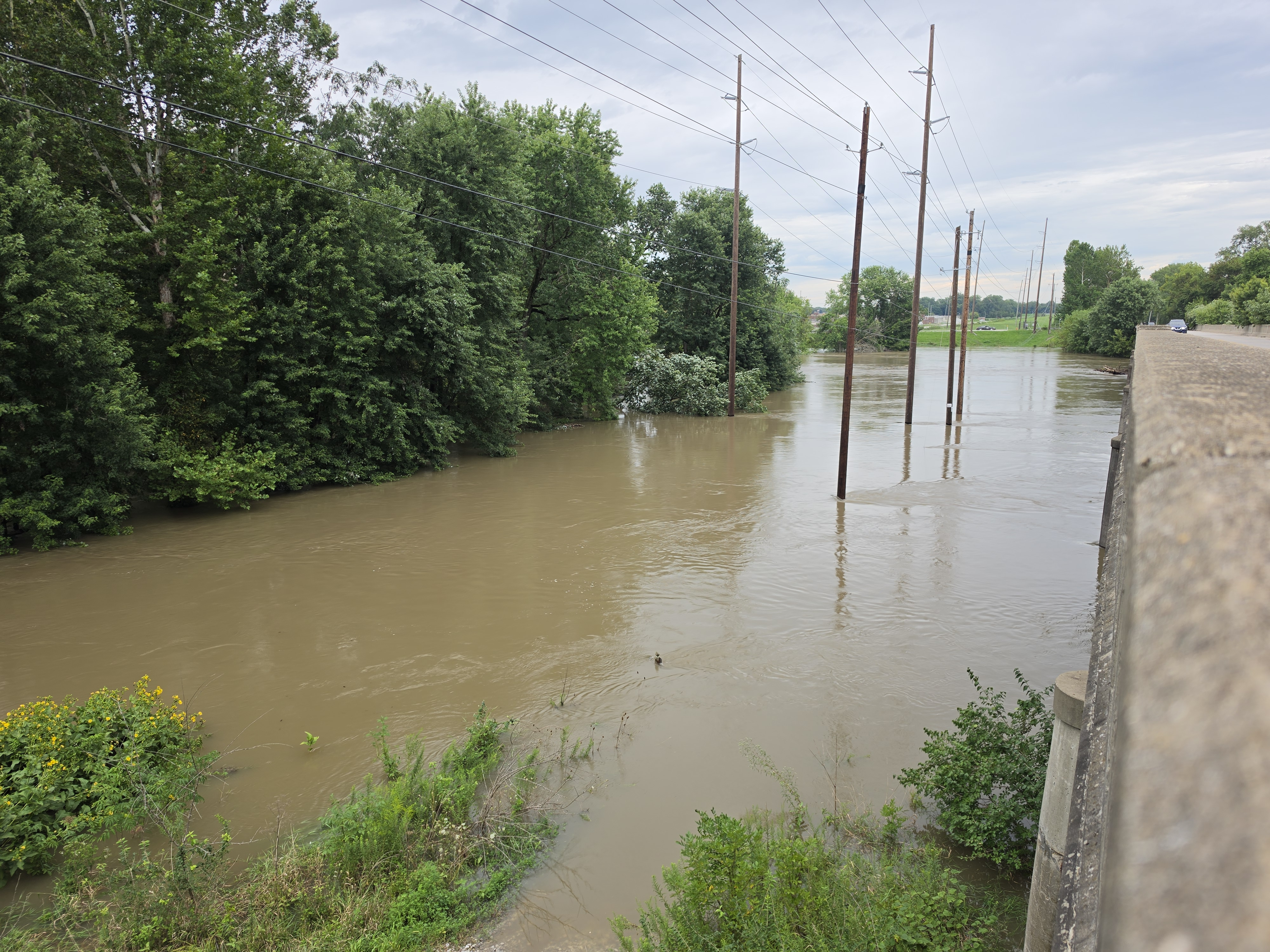
This image shows the White River flowing under the bridge at Southport Road during the flood on August 15, 2026.

Across Indiana, a peak of 300,000 lost power. Strong winds brought down a tree onto a house in Jennings County on August 11, killing a boy. An EF2 tornado also caused significant damage in St. John. A house explosion killed a woman in Portage during the storm while another was struck by roofing material in Gary. The following day, a man died in a crash in LaPorte County. Parts of the state reported over 11 in (280 mm) of rain in a two-day period. New Castle recorded a 1-in-1000 year rainfall rate with over 11 in (280 mm) in 32 hours. Most of the severe flooding took place along the White River Corridor. In Anderson, the White River beat the record set in 1913, rising to 24.9 ft (7.6 m). A near similar situation occurred in Noblesville, where the White River rose to a record level of 24.6 ft (7.5 m). On August 13, a statewide disaster emergency was issued by Indiana Governor Mike Braun. In Delaware County, two bodies, one who may have attempted to drive through floodwaters and another who went missing on August 12 after entering the Mississinewa River, were found on August 14 and 15 respectively. Over 350 evacuations were reported in Delaware County by August 15. The Indianapolis Fire Department reported 95 people and 45 pets were rescued as well. Around 400 evacuated from parts of northern Indianapolis. In New Castle, one died after biking along a washed-out section of road. The Whitewater Valley Railroad estimated the cost to repair damage to its railroads to be in the millions. On the night of August 16, a levee burst in Madison Township, triggering evacuations and 11 people rescued across Morgan County. The Hazel Dell Parkway bridge over Blue Woods Creek in Carmel partially washed away, the largest infrastructure loss in Hamilton County. Officials said a new design for a replacement bridge would take 60 days, with construction estimated to be complete by the end of 2027. Heavy erosion also threatened a wastewater main break.

=== Ohio ===
Early on August 11, Perry County recorded over 6.5 in (170 mm) in just a few hours, causing flooding on many roads and prompting a flash flood emergency to be issued. A person in a medical emergency died in Perry County after flooded roads prevented first responders to reach them. More than 130,000 American Electric Power customers lost power. The same day, a state of emergency was declared by Ohio Governor Mike DeWine for Perry and Muskingum counties and mobilized the National Guard. Another round of storms on August 15 brought additional rainfall and flooding to Perry, Muskingum, and Morgan counties. Relief efforts in Crooksville were severely impacted by the flooding. Additionally, at least 14 tornadoes touched down in the state.

=== Kentucky ===
Over 103,000 customers across the state were without power on August 11. The storms left a peak of over 19,000 Kentucky Power customers without electricity. On the night of August 13, Knott County saw 1.5–3.25 in (38–83 mm) of rain in several hours and a flash flood emergency was issued for the county. Schools were cancelled in Floyd, Knott, and Letcher counties for August 14.

== Aftermath ==
On August 15, an Emergency Disaster Declaration was authorized by United States President Donald Trump.

Gunfire briefly halted power restoration by NIPSCO crews in Gary, Indiana.

The Indianapolis Colts and Pacers Sports & Entertainment donated $125,000 each to flood relief efforts across Indiana on August 16. American Electric Power Ohio donated $150,000 to the American Red Cross Central & Southern Ohio Region on August 17. The same day, Indiana Governor Mike Braun announced a $5,000 disaster relief fund for individuals.

An initial 6,000 meals were sent to Indianapolis by Cultivate Food Rescue. On August 23, with more than 10,000 people still without power in Northwest Indiana, World Central Kitchen distributed 4,000 meals to residents in Gary and Lake Ridge.
