= William Edward Woodard =

American locomotive designer (1873–1942)

- Born: 18 November 1873; Utica, New York, United States
- Died: 24 March 1942 (aged 68); Forest Hills, Queens, United States
- Known for: Inventor of Superpower steam

William Edward Woodard was an American locomotive designer, best known for being the vice president of engineering at Lima Locomotive Works and the inventor of Superpower steam.

== Early life ==
Woodard was born in Utica, New York to George E. and Louise Hayford Woodard. He graduated from Cornell University in Ithaca, New York with a degree in mechanical engineering.

== Career ==
He initially worked for Americas two biggest locomotives makers, Baldwin Locomotive Works in Philadelphia and American Locomotive Company in Schenectady, New York before joining Lima Locomotive Works in Lima, Ohio in 1919. At Lima works Woodard changed the steam era forever by inventing superpower steam. This was basically the enlargement of the firebox area, which let the train go faster and get greater tractive effort. His best known locomotive design is the 2-8-4 also known as Berkshires. He was designated a Modern Pioneer by the National Association of Manufacturers in 1940, and in the same year received the George R. Henderson Medal from the Franklin Institute, Philadelphia, for his accomplishments in locomotive engineering and his contributions to steam-locomotive design. He died on March 24, 1942 at the age of 77 in Forest Hills, Queens. He was survived by his wife Phoebe, one son, two daughters and eight grandchildren.

== In popular culture ==
One of Woodards locomotives, Pere Marquette 1225 was the inspiration for a young Chris Van Allsburg to write his 1985 childrens book The Polar Express. The locomotive was also used in the 2004 film adaptation.
