= Lima LS-1000 =

Lima-Hamilton A-3080
Type and origin
- Power type: Diesel-electric
- Builder: Lima-Hamilton Corporation
- Model: A-3080
- Build date: May 1949 – April 1950
- Total produced: 38
Specifications
- Configuration
  - AAR: B-B
  - UIC: Bo′Bo′
- Gauge: 4 ft 8 1/2 in (1,435 mm)
- Length: 47 ft 10 in (14.58 m)
- Loco weight: 250,500 lb (113.6 t)
- Prime mover: Hamilton Engines and Machinery T89SA
- Engine type: 4-stroke diesel
- Aspiration: Turbocharged
- Displacement: 6,107 cu in (100.08 L)
- Generator: Westinghouse 499A
- Traction motors: Westinghouse 362D (4)
- Cylinders: Inline 8
- Cylinder size: 9 in × 12 in (229 mm × 305 mm)
- Loco brake: Straight air
- Train brakes: Air
Performance figures
- Maximum speed: 60 mph (97 km/h)
- Power output: 1,000 hp (746 kW)
- Tractive effort: 74,508 lbf (331.4 kN)
Career
- Class: NYC- DES-15a NKP- LS-10 WAB- D10
- Locale: North America

The A-3080 (LS-1000) is a diesel-electric switcher locomotive built between May 1949 and April 1950, by the Lima-Hamilton Corporation of Lima, Ohio, United States. The A-3080 is a 1,000 hp (750 kW) switcher, which became the standard for Lima's designs. By changing fuel rack settings, the A-3080 was upgraded to the A-3170, with 1,200 hp (890 kW) from the same turbocharged Hamilton T89SA four-stroke, eight cylinder inline diesel engine. A Westinghouse generator and four Westinghouse traction motors provided the 74,508 lbf (331.43 kN) of tractive effort.

Lima-Hamilton never assigned a model number to their models but referred to them by specification numbers. Model designations such as LS-1000 were a railfan invention. Lima-Hamilton assigned A-3080 as the specification number for this particular unit.

== History ==
In 1946 Lima's Class 1 market prospects were bleak unless it could enter the diesel-electric locomotive field quickly, but they couldn't afford a full-scale development program. Lima was viewed as an attractive potential partner by other firms eager to enter the market. One proposal was from Fairbanks-Morse, since the five-year contract with General Electric to build road locomotives for Fairbanks-Morse would run out in 1949, and GE had no interest in renewing the contract since they were working with the American Locomotive Company (ALCO), and already had designs of their own for the road diesel market. Although all the details of the Fairbanks-Morse proposal are not known, it appears to have offered little more than a contract to assemble locomotives and that Fairbanks-Morse wanted a manufacturing facility, not a partner.

At the time, Lima was also conducting discussions with the General Machinery Corporation. One of the companies making up General Machinery Corporation was Hamilton Press and Machinery Company. One of Hamilton's products was a diesel engine for marine and stationary generator applications. On July 30, 1947, Lima Locomotive Works and General Machinery Corporation merged to form the Lima-Hamilton Corporation. Almost immediately there were differences in goals between management.

The General Machinery Corporation management wanted to terminate steam locomotive production, while the Lima management was still committed to the development of a 4-8-6 super steam locomotive, nicknamed "double-bubble" for its unique firebox, designed with poppet valves, to be a true competitor in the diesel market, the design of which began in 1929. By April 1949, the design was shelved, and Lima finished its final steam locomotives a month later. Chief Mechanical Officer Bert Townsend resigned in protest of the decision to scrap the plans to build steam locomotives.

The A-3080's similarity to the ALCO S-4 switcher may be more than a coincidence. Former ALCO engineer F. J. Geittman was hired by General Machinery Corporation prior to the merger with Lima to oversee their diesel locomotive project. His job was to develop a new prime mover, as the current Hamilton diesel engine was not suited for locomotive applications.

Hamilton engineers proved to be worthy counterparts to their Lima brethren. They realized from the start that high power-to-weight ratios yield no advantages for locomotives, since locomotives are traditionally weighted with ballast to obtain optimal adhesion. This allowed them to incorporate heavier crankshafts, bearings, connecting rods and other parts. Whereas the competition was experiencing road failures with their engines because they followed traditional design methods and used lightweight components.

On May 13, 1949, Lima-Hamilton unveiled its first diesel, A-3080 #1000, the first of five demonstrators #1000-1004. #1000 became Toledo, Peoria and Western #300, #1001 became American Rolling Mill Company #707, #1002 and 1003 became Wabash #400 and 407 respectively, and #1004 became Indian Hill and Iron Range #302.

In September 1951, Lima-Hamilton merged with Baldwin Locomotive Works forming Baldwin-Lima-Hamilton. Baldwin's primary interest was Lima's shovel and crane business which was expected to do well with the upcoming highway building boom. Lima-Hamilton's locomotive business was discontinued after the merger. Baldwin-Lima-Hamilton's locomotive fortunes declined as the rush by railroads to replace steam power subsided. B-L-H exited the new locomotive market in May 1956.

== Original owners ==
Owner	Quantity	Road numbers
Armco Steel	3	707 (ex-Lima-Hamilton demonstrator 1001), 708, 709
Baltimore & Ohio Railroad	10	330–339
Erie Railroad	10	650–659, to Erie Lackawanna in 1960, same numbers
Indian Hill and Iron Range	1	302 (ex Lima-Hamilton demonstrator 1004)
New York Central Railroad	6	8400–8405
New York, Chicago and St. Louis Railroad (Nickel Plate Road)	4	305-308 (305 first production A-3080) to Norfolk and Western in 1964, same numbers
Toledo, Peoria and Western Railway	3	300 (ex Lima-Hamilton demonstrator 1000), 301, 302
Wabash Railroad	2	400, 407 (ex Lima-Hamilton demonstrators 1002 and 1003) to Norfolk and Western in 1964, same numbers
	38	

== Preservation ==
The last extant A-3080, former ARMCO Steel 709, is operated by the Whitewater Valley Railroad
