= Wabash Central Railroad =

Overview
- Headquarters: Corydon, Indiana
- Reporting mark: WBCR
- Locale: Indiana
- Dates of operation: 1997–

Technical
- Track gauge: 4 ft 8 1/2 in (1,435 mm) standard gauge

The Wabash Central Railroad (reporting mark WBCR) is a short-line railroad that operates between Van Buren and Craigville, United States, crossing a Norfolk Southern Railway line in Bluffton. It was owned by RMW Ventures, LLC and began operations in 1997, replacing the Indiana Hi-Rail Corporation on an ex-Toledo, St. Louis and Western Railroad line.

As of 26 October 2023, New Era Railroad LLC has purchased the Wabash Central.

== History ==
The line was completed in about 1880 by the Delphos, Bluffton and Frankfort Railroad and Frankfort, St. Louis and Toledo Railroad, predecessors of the Toledo, St. Louis and Western Railroad (Clover Leaf). In about 1990, the Indiana Hi-Rail Corporation leased from the Norfolk Southern Railway the portion of the old Clover Leaf between Douglas, Ohio and Van Buren, Indiana. After that company went bankrupt, the new Wabash Central Railroad acquired the portion west of Craigville, beginning operations in December 1997. (Another portion, in Ohio, went to the Delphos Terminal Company, and the rest was abandoned.) The Big 4 Terminal Company bought about 1.5 miles (2.4 km) at the Craigville end in 2003 to conduct switching services.
