= Napoleon, Defiance & Western Railway =

American railway in Ohio and Indiana

- Pioneer Railcorps' PREX 3054, an EMD GP20 locomotive shortly after being painted in the company's colors.

Overview
- Headquarters: Defiance, Ohio
- Reporting mark: NDW
- Locale: Ohio, Indiana
- Dates of operation: 2012–

Technical
- Track gauge: 4 ft 8 1/2 in (1,435 mm) standard gauge
- Length: 58 miles (93 km)

Other
- Website: patriotrail.com/rail/napoleon-defiance-western-railway-co-ndw/

The Napoleon, Defiance & Western Railway (NDW) (a wholly owned subsidiary of the Michigan Southern Railroad) is a Class III railroad in the United States owned by the Patriot Rail Company that operates between Woodburn, Indiana and Napoleon, Ohio and comprises a reported 58 miles (93 km) of track.

== Interchanges ==
- Norfolk Southern Railway in Woodburn, Indiana
- CSX Transportation in Defiance, Ohio

== Operations ==
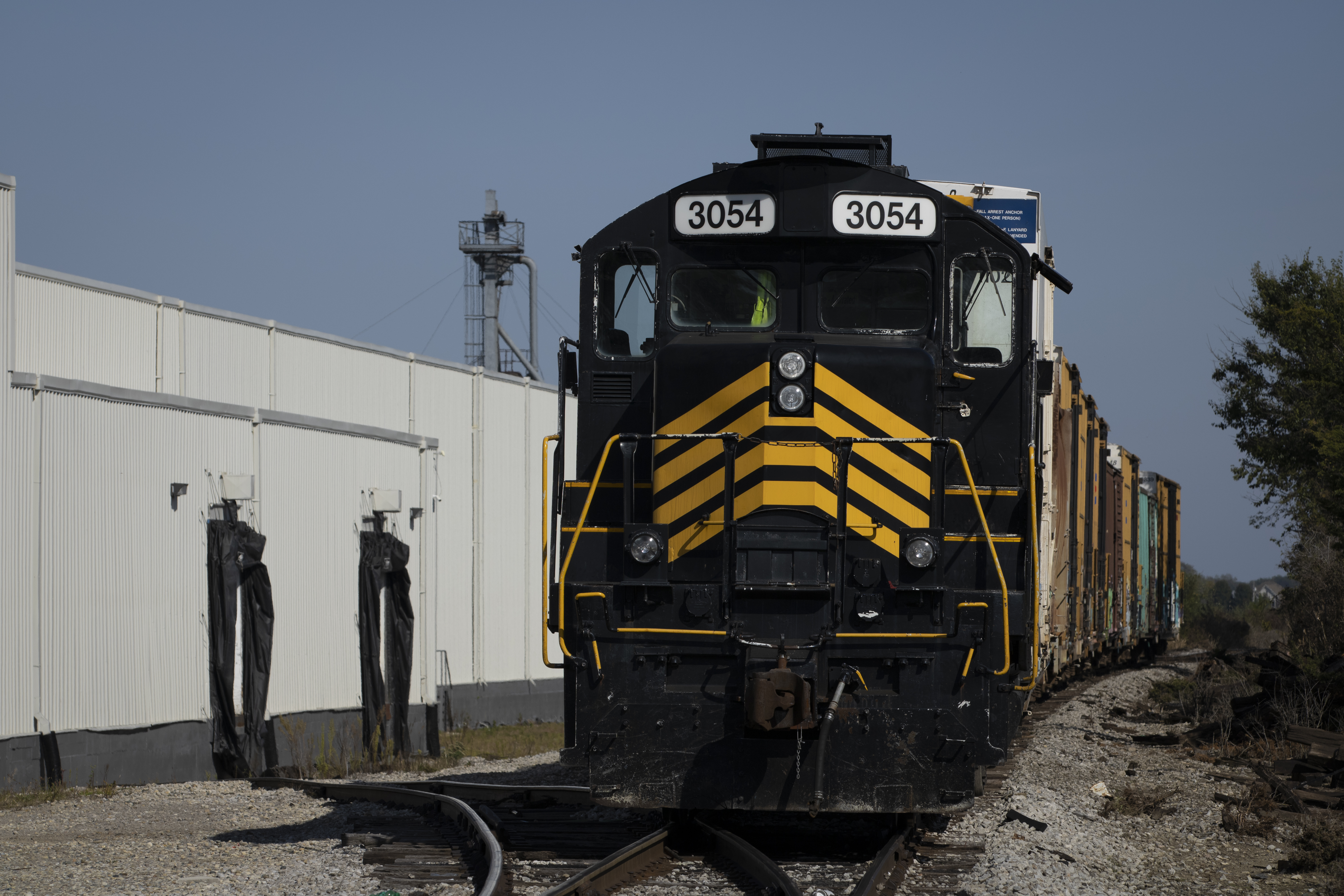
ND&W train in Napoleon (October 2021)

The railroad normally operates Monday through Saturday with trains typically moving railcars from the interchanges with CSX at Defiance, Ohio and Norfolk Southern at Woodburn, Indiana to customers located along the line and returning cars back to the interchanges. Some customers also require switching service to move railcars for loading and unloading. The railroad also operates over 3 miles of track that runs south from Cecil, Ohio to the Lafarge North America (Paulding Plant). This section of track was originally part of the Cincinnati Northern Railroad and is owned and maintained by Lafarge.

In past years, the section of the line between Cecil and Defiance was largely inactive due to a lack of customers and poor track conditions. As the track conditions have improved, trains operating through this section have been more common. The restoration of this section has given customers the option to route their traffic through more than one interchange, potentially reducing their shipping costs.

The section of the line that served Liberty Center, Ohio was taken out of service in 2016. While that portion of the line has not been officially abandoned, the rails have been removed from a point immediately west of US-24 and continuing east through Liberty Center. That portion of the line had been primarily used for car storage.

The railroad's main yard is located between 5th Street and Davidson Street in Defiance. The railroad's headquarters is located at 817 5th Street in a restored Wabash Railroad-era freight house adjacent to the main yard. The railroad does not have a dedicated engine house and it's not uncommon to find locomotives tied down at various locations on the line.

== Customers ==
Since taking over operations of the line from the Maumee and Western Railroad, the owners of the Napoleon, Defiance & Western have steadily increased the number of customers served by rail and the volume of traffic operating over the line. The current list of customers served includes:

=== Napoleon, Ohio ===
- Interstate Cold Storage
- Cloverleaf Cold Storage
- Americold Logistics
- Advanced Drainage Systems
- Oldcastle Infrastructure
- Transload facility operated by the Napoleon, Defiance & Western

=== Okolona, Ohio ===
- Republic Mills

=== Defiance, Ohio ===
- APackaging Group
- Johns Manville - 2 locations
- Tessenderlo Kerley

=== Paulding, Ohio ===
- LafargeHolcim
- Systech Environmental

=== Woodburn, Indiana ===
- Ag Plus

== History ==
The railroad line was originally a main line on the Wabash Railroad 5th District from New Haven, Indiana, to Toledo, Ohio. Subsequent owners included the Norfolk and Western Railway, Norfolk Southern Railway, the Indiana Hi-Rail Corporation and the Maumee & Western Railroad. The line was purchased by Pioneer Railcorp on December 28, 2012, for $5.4 million. In 2019, Pioneer Railcorp was acquired by BRX Transportation Holdings and renamed as Pioneer Lines. In September 2022, Patriot Rail Company LLC purchased Pioneer Lines from BRX Transportation Holdings. In 2023, the railroad was named "Shortline of the Year" by "Railway Age".

=== "Worst Railroad Tracks in America" ===
When it purchased the rail line, Pioneer described it as being "in dire need of rehabilitation," Prior to Pioneer's purchase, the line had been dubbed by some as being the "Worst Railroad Tracks in America" due to its poor track conditions. The track conditions were the result of decades of underinvestment in maintenance. The poor conditions were also attributed to the fact that the line had been run through a portion of the former Great Black Swamp and the underlying wetland soils made it difficult to maintain the railroad in good condition.

The conditions were so poor that the entire line was classified as "excepted", the lowest possible track classification. That classification limited track speed to 10 MPH although trains often operated at even slower speeds to limit the number of derailments, which happened frequently. It also limited the height, length and type of cars that could move over the line. Much of the track was old, lightweight 80 pound rail, which restricted the weight of the carloads that could operate over the line.

=== Rehabilitating the Napoleon, Defiance & Western ===
Starting with Pioneer taking ownership of the line and with funding assistance from Ohio and Indiana and the federal government, extensive efforts have been made to address the decades of deferred maintenance and to improve the overall state of the railroad. This work started on day one of operations with a focus on replacing decayed ties, broken rails, clearing brush and trees from the railroad right-of-way, putting down ballast and upgrading railroad crossings. In recent years, the work has shifted to replacing the 80 pound rail with more robust rail that can support heavier car loadings.

The pace of improvements accelerated after the purchase of Pioneer RailCorp by BRX Transportation Holdings. The new CEO of Pioneer Lines, Alex Yeros, set a goal to upgrade all of the track owned by Pioneer Lines railroads, to at least Class 1 standards. The current owner, Patriot Rail, has continued the efforts to upgrade all of the main line to Class 1 standards. When the work associated with the Phase 3 CRISI grant is completed, the railroad will have new rail and ties along the entire active portion of the line, and there will be no significant deferred track maintenance remaining.

The list of improvements include:

==== 2013 ====
- Phase 1 - Sidings and Track Rehabilitation
  - New sidings east of Cecil and on the east side of Napoleon
  - Track rehabilitation of the section of the line between Cecil and Defiance
  - Funding: $450,000 grant from Ohio Rail Development Commission (ORDC) and $290,000 from NDW
- Lafarge
  - Lafarge added a storage track in their right-of-way north of their Paulding plant to accommodate additional rail traffic to and from their facility.

==== 2014 ====
- Phase 2 - Defiance Yard and Track Rehabilitation
  - Rehabilitate Defiance Yard (work completed in 2019)
  - Track rehabilitation on the west end of line and of high traffic sections
  - Funding: $450,000 grant from ORDC and $1 million loan from ORDC
  - Loan repaid in full in 2019 as part of BRX Transportation Holdings acquisition of the railroad

==== 2016 ====
- Railroad crossing closures
  - Removal of rails and crossing equipment at 7 crossings including US-24 and east along the line into Liberty Center
  - Funding: ORDC
- Track Upgrades
  - Improvements to the tracks on the system to compensate for ending services to Liberty Center
  - Funding: ORDC
- Transload Facility - Napoleon
  - Construct a transload facility in Napoleon to serve customers on the portion of the line to Liberty Center that is being taken out of service. This facility also can serve new customers in need of a transload facility.
  - Funding: $285,000 grant from ORDC and $285,000 from NDW

==== 2020 ====
- Consolidated Rail Infrastructure and Safety Improvements (CRISI) grant (Critical Safety Improvements) - Phase 1
  - Replacement of 10 miles of rail with 132 pound rail from 80 pound rail and replacement of 29,000 ties on 29 miles of track between Woodburn and Defiance
  - Upgrade track from "excepted" to "Class 1" status
  - Funding: $4.1 million from U.S. Department of Transportation, $3.8 million from NDW and $250,000 from ODRC
  - Video highlighting track improvements funded by NDW CRISI Rehabilitation Project

==== 2021 ====
- Rail Replacement Project
  - Replacement of 3 miles of 80 pound rail with 112 pound rail east and west of Okolona (Milepost 40 to Milepost 43)
  - Relay rail provided by Pioneer Lines from another Pioneer-owned railroad
  - Funding: $687,000 from ORDC, $192,000 from NDW and $495,000 from NDW/Pioneer from in-kind materials

==== 2022 ====
- Public Utilities Commission of Ohio Rail Crossing Safety Upgrade
  - Install flashing lights and gates at West High Street grade crossing in Defiance County
  - Funding: 80% from Ohio State Grade Crossing Protection Fund and 20% from NDW, up to a total of $285,000
- APackaging Group
  - Grant towards rail siding access at new facility in Defiance
  - Funding: $100,000 from ORDC and $628,000 from APackaging Group
- Tessenderlo Kerley
  - Grant towards rail siding access at new Tessenderlo Kerley facility in Defiance
  - Funding: $75,000 from ORDC with remainder of costs covered by Tessenderlo Kerley.

==== 2023 ====
- Railroad Crossing Improvements
  - Funding: $40,000 from Indiana Department of Transportation
- Consolidated Rail Infrastructure and Safety Improvements (CRISI) grant - Phase 2
  - Replacement of rail from Napoleon to Okolona and Jewell to Defiance and associated improvements
  - Funding: $9.2 million from U.S. Department of Transportation, $3.7 million from NDW and $264,000 from ODRC

==== 2024 ====
- Consolidated Rail Infrastructure and Safety Improvements (CRISI) grant - Phase 3
  - Replacement of rail and associated improvements from Woodburn, Indiana to Cecil, Ohio and selected locations between Cecil and Defiance
  - Funding: Up to $12.1 million from U.S. Department of Transportation, $3 million from NDW and $750,000 from ODRC

== Current locomotive fleet ==
Manufacturer	Model	Year of Manufacture	Road Number	Engine
Electro Motive Division	GP20u	1961	2026	EMD 567D2 16 cylinder 2000 hp
Electro Motive Division	GP20u	1961	2045	EMD 567D2 16 cylinder 2000 hp
Electro Motive Division	GP20u	1960	3001	EMD 567D2 16 cylinder 2000 hp
Electro Motive Division	GP20u	1961	3054	EMD 567D2 16 cylinder 2000 hp

Preceded by Vermont Railway	Short Line Railroad of the Year; 2023; Honorable mention: Eastern Idaho Railroad	Succeeded by Mississippi Export Railroad; Honorable mention: Aberdeen, Carolina and Western Railway
