= Lima 750 and 800 hp switchers =

Lima A-3149 and A-3171
- Cincinnati Union Terminal railroad number 25, an A-3149 (LS-750)
Type and origin
- Power type: Diesel-electric
- Builder: Lima-Hamilton Corporation
- Model: A-3149 (LS-750); A-3171 (LS-800)
- Build date: April 1950 to June 1951 (A-3149) September 1950 (A-3171)
- Total produced: A-3149: 6 A-3171: 23
Specifications
- Configuration
  - AAR: B-B
  - UIC: Bo′Bo′
- Gauge: 4 ft 8 1/2 in (1,435 mm)
- Length: 47 ft 10 in (14.58 m) (both)
- Prime mover: Hamilton Engines and Machinery T69SA
- Engine type: 4-stroke diesel
- Aspiration: Turbocharged
- Displacement: 4,580 cu in (75.1 L)
- Generator: Westinghouse 499A (both)
- Traction motors: Westinghouse 362D (4) (both)
- Cylinders: Inline 6
- Cylinder size: 9 in × 12 in (229 mm × 305 mm)
- Loco brake: Straight air
- Train brakes: Air
Performance figures
- Power output: 750 hp (559 kW) or 800 hp (597 kW)
- Tractive effort: 74,508 lbf (331.43 kN)
Career
- Operators: Cincinnati Union Terminal, Chicago River and Indiana, Chicago, Rock Island and Pacific
- Class: CUT- DES-10w (A-3149) CR&I- DES-19a (A-3171)
- Locale: United States

The A-3149 (LS-750) and A-3171 (LS-800) were diesel-electric switching locomotives built between November 1949 and June 1951, by the Lima-Hamilton Corporation of Lima, Ohio, U.S.A.. The A-3149 is a 750 horsepower (560 kW) switcher. It was later upgraded to 800 hp (600 kW) by changing fuel rack settings. Both models used the same turbocharged Hamilton T69SA four-stroke, six cylinder inline diesel engine, a Westinghouse generator and 4 Westinghouse traction motors.

All six A-3149’s were sold to a single railroad, Cincinnati Union Terminal (CUT class DES-10w) with two (#24-25) being sold after the A-3171 had been introduced. The 23 A-3171’s were sold to just two railroads, the Chicago, Rock Island and Pacific bought 2, and Chicago River and Indiana (a subsidiary of the New York Central System, CR&I class DES-19a) bought 21.

Lima-Hamilton did not assign model numbers to their models but referred to them by specification numbers. Model designations such as LS-750 or LS-800 were a railfan invention. Lima-Hamilton assigned A-3149 as the specification number for the 750 hp model, and A-3171 as the specification number for the 800 hp model.

== Original owners ==
=== A-3149 ===
Railroad	Qty	Road Numbers	Notes
Cincinnati Union Terminal (Whitewater Valley Railroad)	6	20–25	to Penn Central in 1968, same numbers, 25 to Whitewater Valley Railroad in 1972

=== A-3171 ===
Railroad	Qty	Road Numbers	Notes
Chicago, Rock Island and Pacific Railroad	2	800–801	
Chicago River and Indiana Railroad (subsidiary of New York Central Railroad)	21	9800–9820	

== Preservation ==
The last extant A-3149, former Cincinnati Union Terminal 25, is operated by the Whitewater Valley Railroad
