= Lima LRS-1200 =

A-3174
Type and origin
- Power type: Diesel-electric
- Builder: Lima-Hamilton Corporation
- Serial number: 9423-9438
- Model: A-3174 (LRS-1200)
- Build date: August 1950 – October 1950
- Total produced: 16
- Rebuilder: Electro-Motive Division
- Number rebuilt: 2
Specifications
- Configuration
  - AAR: B-B
  - UIC: Bo′Bo′
- Gauge: 4 ft 8 1/2 in (1,435 mm)
- Trucks: AAR Type B
- Wheel diameter: 40 in (1.016 m)
- Length: 56 ft 3 in (17.15 m)
- Adhesive weight: 247,500 lb (112,300 kg)
- Fuel capacity: 800 US gal (3,000 L)
- Prime mover: Hamilton Engines and Machinery T89SA
- RPM
  - RPM idle: 275
  - Maximum RPM: 800
- Engine type: 4-stroke diesel
- Aspiration: Turbocharged
- Displacement: 6,107 cu in (100.08 L)
- Generator: Westinghouse 499C
- Traction motors: Westinghouse 362-DF (4)
- Cylinders: Inline 8
- Cylinder size: 9 in × 12 in (229 mm × 305 mm)
- Gear ratio: 68:14
- Loco brake: Straight air
- Train brakes: Air
Performance figures
- Maximum speed: 60 mph (97 km/h)
- Power output: 1,200 hp (895 kW)
- Tractive effort: 34,000 lbf (151.24 kN)
Career
- Operators: New York Central, Penn Central
- Class: NYC DRSP-5am, PC LRS12sx or LERS12as
- Numbers: NYC 5800–5815 later 6200–6215, PC 8062 & 8063 later 8398 & 8399
- Disposition: All scrapped

The A-3174 (LRS-1200) was a model of 1,200 hp (895 kW) B-B diesel locomotive built by Lima-Hamilton in 1950. All sixteen units were built for the New York Central. A second order of 17 was outstanding at the time of Lima-Hamilton's merger with the Baldwin Locomotive Works, but owing to insufficient time to build the locomotives before the locomotive production ceased at Lima, NYC agreed to receive RS-12s from BLH, they were built at Eddystone, PA.

Lima-Hamilton never assigned a model number to their models, but instead referred to them by specification numbers. Model designations such as LRS-1200 were a railfan invention. Lima-Hamilton assigned A-3174 as the specification number for this particular model.

Most of these locomotives were retired in the mid-1960's, although two remained in service into the Penn Central era. The surviving units, 8062 and 8063, were rebuilt to replace their original Lima prime movers with EMD V12 567C engines, like those in SW1200s and E8's. They were renumbered 8398-8399 in 1972 to make way for the new GP38-2's PC ordered, which were to be numbered 7940-8162. PC 8399 was retired in November 1974, and PC 8398 was retired in February 1975. No LRS-1200s survive today.
