= Indiana Southwestern Railway =

Overview
- Headquarters: Peoria, Illinois (corporate); Evansville, Indiana (operations)
- Reporting mark: ISW
- Locale: Evansville, Indiana
- Dates of operation: 2000–present

Technical
- Track gauge: 4 ft 8 1/2 in (1,435 mm) standard gauge

Other
- Website: pioneerlines.com/indiana-southwestern-railway-isw/

Indiana Southwestern Railway (reporting mark ISW) is a subsidiary of Pioneer Railcorp, operator of several short-line railroad companies. The ISW is a Class III railroad, and operated on 17 miles of track from Evansville, Indiana, northward to Cynthiana, Indiana. That track is currently out of service but switching still occurs in ISW's yard and surrounding industries.

The line was originally operated as part of an Illinois Central Railroad line that ran all the way to Newton, Illinois. Illinois Central sold off the line south of Browns, Illinois, to Indiana Hi-Rail Corporation; the line went through a succession of operators, all of which had to contend with the line's ancient bridge over the Wabash River near Grayville, Illinois. The bridge suffered damage from floods on more than one occasion, and one span finally collapsed completely in 2005.

Pioneer bought the line and its Evansville shops in 2000 from the Evansville Terminal Railway. However, when Pioneer stopped shipping grain, the track had to be dismantled and salvaged at the close of 2011. Only the small stretch from the interchange northwest of Evansville to just north of their yard is still used, a distance of about 4 miles.

The dates back to 1881 as part of the Evansville and Peoria Railroad, which then became part of the Peoria, Decatur & Evansville Railway through a series of purchases. The PD&E became part of Illinois Central in 1900. The ISW is currently the only remaining in-service segment of the PD&E south of Mattoon, Illinois.
