= Indiana Hi-Rail Corporation =

Indiana Hi-Rail
Overview
- Reporting mark: IHRC
- Locale: Midwestern United States
- Dates of operation: 1981–1998
- Successor: Whitewater Valley Railroad (1983; one mile of track sold); Wabash Central Railroad; Decatur Junction Railway; Maumee & Western Railroad; Indiana Southwestern Railway

Technical
- Track gauge: 4 ft 8 1/2 in (1,435 mm) standard gauge
- Length: 461 Miles

Indiana Hi-Rail Corporation (reporting mark IHRC) was a railroad which operated lines in the U.S. states of Indiana, Illinois and Ohio. It ceased operations after it was declared bankrupt in 1997. The railroad was known for its extensive use of locomotives built by the American Locomotive Company (ALCO).
