= 2026 Gary power outage =

Power outage in the United States

2026 Lake County, Indiana Power Outage
- Lake County, Indiana
- Date: August 11–26, 2026
- Duration: 2 weeks
- Location: Lake County, Indiana
- Type: Power outage
- Cause: Storms, flooding, Schererville electric pole fire
- Participants: 363,398
- Property damage: 44 (destroyed), 959 (major), 520 (minor)
- Inquiries: Indiana Office of Utility Consumer Counselor to file complaint into Northern Indiana Public Service Company
- Litigation: Class action lawsuit against Northern Indiana Public Service Company

A power outage in Lake County, Indiana began on August 11, 2026, following an intense storm that affected regions of Northwest Indiana and Northeast Illinois. The power outage affected 95% of Lake County residents. Nearby Flora and Camden also experienced all-city blackouts. Power was restored to 99% of those without power as of August 26.

On August 20, Governor of Indiana Mike Braun requested a FEMA major disaster declaration under the Stafford Disaster Relief and Emergency Assistance Act.

== Cause ==
On August 11, a deadly derecho storm, tornadoes, and historic levels of flooding began in Indiana, resulting in 8 deaths, 350+ evacuations, and massive property damage. The Indiana government declared a 'local disaster emergency' in Lake County as well as in nearby Carroll County, Fayette County, Henry County, Porter County and Tipton County.

According to Governor Braun, "Lake County was hit by at least two (2) tornadoes, consisting of one (1) EF-1 tornado and one (1) EF-2 tornado. The severe storms and flooding caused 95% of Lake County to lose power, which was the largest power outage event in Northern Indiana Public Service Company's history."

In June, Lake County had been hit by five tornadoes. Some local residents were still waiting for disaster relief from the June tornadoes when the derecho occurred and blackout began.

== Outage ==
The power outage – initially resulting in 363,398–374,500 NIPSCO customers losing electricity – was expected to last from August 11, 2026, to August 25, 2026, according to the Northern Indiana Public Service Company (NIPSCO). NIPSCO is the predominant electric and gas service company in northern Indiana. At the same time as the blackout, NiSource, parent of NIPSCO, announced that it would begin "paying out around $140 million in dividends to its shareholders."

One resident, Shatiya Hardin, told CBS News that "At night we're sweating, we're irritable, we have children to look out for, elderly people who need electricity for oxygen tanks... It's not OK for us to continually be in survival mode." Businesses and schools in and around Lake County closed due to the outages and other safety concerns.

Work to restore power was temporarily halted after a NIPSCO utility vehicle was fired upon on August 15. Two workers were scouting in the area when the shooting occurred; both were unharmed. The City of Gary said they would increase security for NIPSCO crews after the incident.

During the second week of the blackout, World Central Kitchen provided food to those still without power or unable to access food. Local organizations City Life Center and Gary Muslim Center also provided residents with warm meals.

NIPSCO had previously reported that power would be restored on August 18, 2026. NIPSCO's website reported that 26,836 residents of Gary were still impacted by outages on August 18, 2026, as reported by the Chicago Tribune.

Residents filed a class action lawsuit through Allen Law Group against NIPSCO on August 17, 2026. The lawsuit alleges that NIPSCO failed to prevent power outages and trim shrubbery near power lines. NIPSCO publicly responded that they "strongly disagree with the characterization of NIPSCO’s vegetation management practices."

On August 23, 20,000+ customers – 14,500 of them in Gary – remained without power. Two days later, on August 25, the number in Gary decreased to 2,000.

An event to distribute relief supplies was held on August 24 by Keith Lee, Tyrese Haliburton, Salvation Army, Ace Hardware, and the Gary government. Lee and Haliburton each donated $15,000. The event provided one relief kit per household, food trucks, additional relief and storm supplies, and more. Lee had previously raised awareness of the conditions in Gary via his popular TikTok.

On August 25, Governor Braun called for the Indiana Office of Utility Consumer Counselor to file a complaint and have Indiana Utility Regulatory Commission to investigate NIPSCO's response to the blackout.

By August 26, 3,500 residents in Lake County, 2,500 of which in Gary, remained without power.

Residents impacted by the derecho or its aftermath can apply for up to $5,000 from the Indiana State Disaster Relief Fund.

NIPSCO Customers without Power by Date
Date	Number of Customers
August 11	374,500
August 18	26,836
August 19	22,000
August 23	20,000
August 24	10,187
August 26	3,500

== Responses ==
=== Local responses ===
Gary's mayor Eddie Melton visited the Tree of Life Missionary Baptist Church, where congregants surrounded him in the pulpit, "laying hands on him and raising their arms in prayer." "Folks are without food", said Melton, "When the lights come on, we still have to replenish refrigerators."

Some residents critiqued Melton's response as slower than that of the mayors of nearby towns. One 27-year-old Gary resident told the Atlanta Black Star that "“Every other mayor seems like they were out and about, getting ready to help with the storm... It wasn’t until about two days later that our mayor even mentioned it and tried to put some on-the-ground relief.” Other residents supported Melton's response to the disaster.

Indiana governor Mike Braun said, "It is time that NIPSCO gets the power back on NOW." A spokesperson for NIPSCO stated, "No outage is being overlooked, and no customer will be left behind."

When announcing the return of electricity for almost all Gary residents, Indiana State Representative and head of the Indiana House Black Legislative Caucus Rep. Harris Jr. added that "people are bothered that it took so long — the impact it's had on their life, having to throw out food. What about those that have medicine that has to be refrigerated, living in the dark? People have had to go and stay at other places... People are bothered, and they want answers as to why this happened, what wasn't in place?"

=== Accusations of discrimination ===
Gary, Indiana is a majority black (~80%) city and 14% of Lake County residents are below the poverty line. NIPSCO's slow response as well as the reduced media coverage of the blackout has resulted in questions of bias, racism, and systemic inequality.

When covering Gary on his TikTok, Lee questioned "Why not a think piece on the fact that communities that look like myself have been without power for eight days." Civil rights leader Bernice King suggested race influenced the sluggish response, stating "This is bigger than a power outage in Gary, Indiana. It is part of a pattern. Black communities have too often been expected to endure conditions that would be treated as intolerable somewhere else. We are expected to survive the neglect, absorb the loss, help ourselves, and wait for urgency to arrive."
