= Superpower steam =

Railroad slang

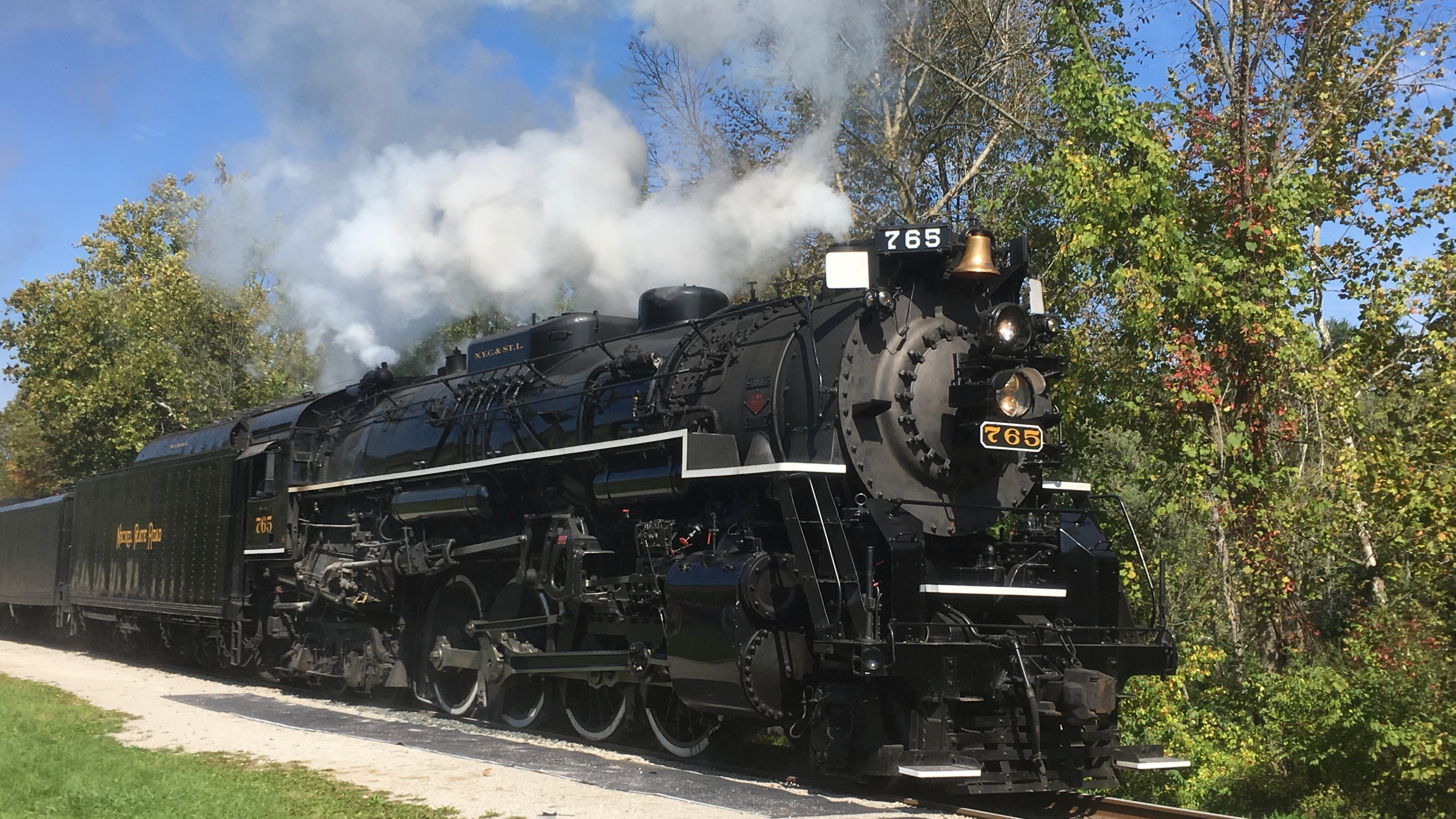
Nickel Plate Railroad 765, a 2-8-4 built by Lima

"Superpower steam" was a term coined by Lima Locomotive Works in the mid-1920s, referring to steam locomotives with booster-equipped four-wheel trailing trucks supporting large fireboxes, as well as enlarged superheaters. The wheel arrangements introduced in the 1920s for these locomotives were the 4-6-4s, 2-8-4s, 4-8-4s and 2-10-4s; and in the 1930s, the 2-6-6-4s. The term "superpower" was later often applied to all locomotives with 4-wheel trailing truck arrangements, though many did not have boosters and almost all steam locomotives of any wheel arrangement built after that time had large superheaters.

The design was invented by Lima for the New York Central's Boston and Albany Railroad. The design was invented by Lima's vice president of engineering, William Woodard, who had experimented with a New York Central 2-8-2 Mikado in 1922. The new design called for double the firebox size than the earlier Mikados, thus giving it more grate area leading to the development of the 2-8-4. The larger grate area meant that the locomotive could achieve greater steaming capacity, higher speeds, more horsepower, and greater tractive effort. To accommodate the larger firebox, Woodard gave the new locomotive a two-axle trailing truck instead of the common single-axle trailing trucks previously used, and tests of the new design were done on the Boston and Albany Railroad. The design was a smashing success, and soon both the Baldwin Locomotive Works and the American Locomotive Company followed suit. Woodard and Lima also briefly considered expanding the concept to 4-8-6 locomotives after completing a Texas and Pacific Railway order for 2-10-4s.
