= Lima LS-1200 =

A-3170
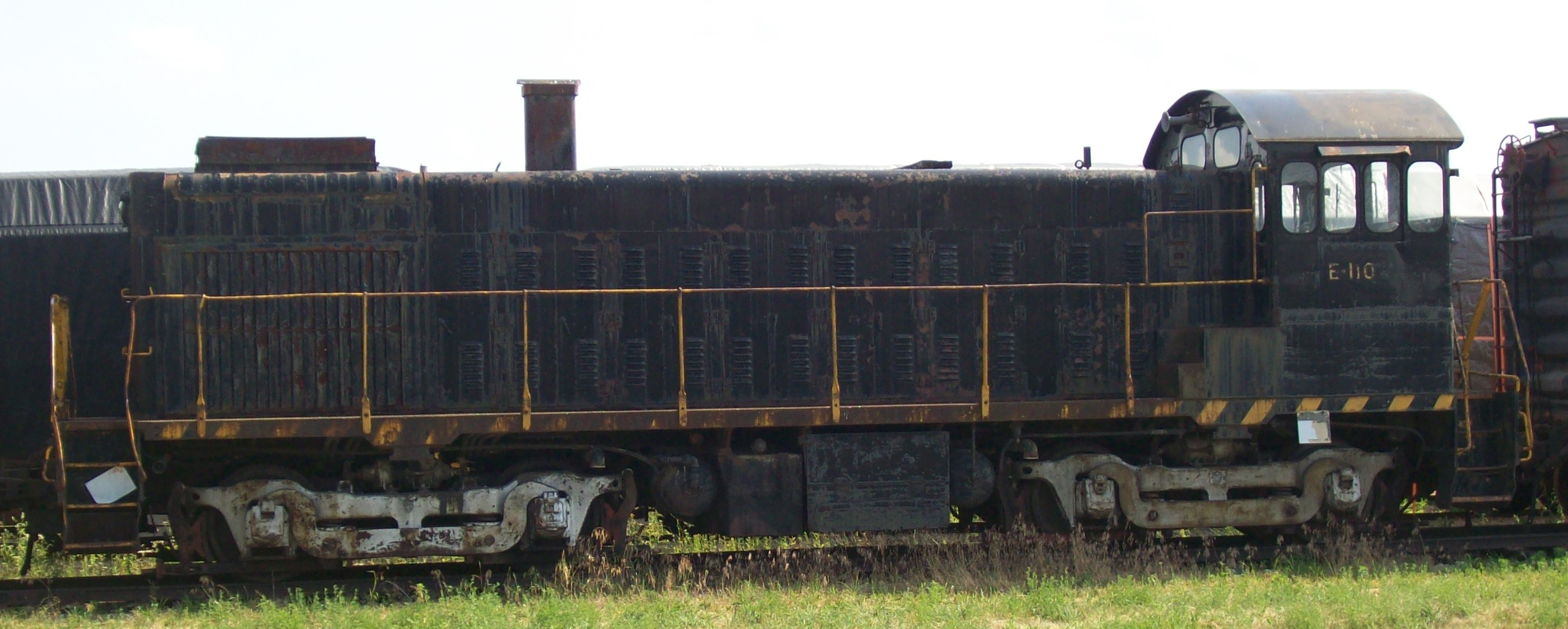
Type and origin
- Power type: Diesel
- Builder: Lima-Hamilton Corporation
- Model: A-3170 (LS-1200)
- Build date: May 1950 – August 1951
- Total produced: 69
Specifications
- Configuration
  - AAR: B-B
  - UIC: Bo′Bo′
- Gauge: 4 ft 8 1/2 in (1,435 mm)
- Wheelbase: 8 ft (2.4 m)
- Length: 47 ft 10 in (14.58 m)
- Loco weight: 250,500 lb (113.6 t)
- Prime mover: Hamilton Engines and Machinery T89SA
- Engine type: 4-stroke diesel
- Aspiration: Turbocharged
- Displacement: 6,107 cu in (100.08 L)
- Generator: Westinghouse 499A
- Traction motors: Westinghouse 362D (4)
- Cylinders: Inline 8
- Cylinder size: 9 in × 12 in (229 mm × 305 mm)
- Loco brake: Straight air
- Train brakes: Air
Performance figures
- Maximum speed: 60 mph (97 km/h)
- Power output: 1,200 hp (895 kW)
- Tractive effort: 74,508 lbf (331.4 kN)
Career
- Class: CR&I- DES-15b NH- DEY-6 NKP- LS-12 WAB- D12
- Locale: North America

The A-3170 (LS-1200) is a diesel-electric switcher locomotive built between May 1950 and August 1951, by the Lima-Hamilton Corporation of Lima, Ohio, United States. Lima's original design was the A-3080, a 1,000 hp (750 kW) switcher, which became the standard for Lima's designs. A 660 hp (490 kW) switcher (proposed specification number A-3081) had also been designed at the request of American Rolling Mill Company, but none were built. By changing fuel rack settings, the A-3080 was upgraded to the A-3170 producing 1,200 hp (890 kW) from a turbocharged Hamilton T89SA four-stroke, eight cylinder inline diesel engine, a Westinghouse generator and 4 Westinghouse traction motors provided the 74,508 lbf (331.43 kN) tractive effort.

Lima-Hamilton did not assign model numbers to their models but referred to them by specification numbers. Model designations such as LS-1200 were a railfan invention. Lima-Hamilton assigned A-3170 as the specification number for this particular unit. The Southern Pacific ordered 60 locomotives but agreed to receive 84 S12s from BLH instead.

== Original owners ==
Image	Owner	Quantity	Road Numbers
	Armco Steel	3	710, E109, E110
	Baltimore & Ohio Railroad	24	320–329, 340–353
	Erie Railroad	6	660–665, to Erie Lackawanna in 1960, same numbers
	Chicago River and Indiana Railroad (New York Central Railroad)	6	8406–8411
	New York, New Haven and Hartford Railroad	10	630-639
	New York, Chicago and St. Louis Railroad (Nickel Plate Road)	4	309–312, to Norfolk and Western in 1964, same numbers
	Terminal Railroad Association of St. Louis	6	1200–1205 (1200 ex Lima-Hamilton demonstrator 1200)
	Wabash Railroad	10	401–406, 408–411, to Norfolk and Western in 1964, same numbers
		69	

== Preservation ==
Two A-3170's are preserved:

- ARMCO Steel E-110, the final locomotive produced by Lima- Hamilton, at the Illinois Railway Museum.
- Baltimore and Ohio 320, at the Whitewater Valley Railroad.
