= Lima Locomotive Works =

Defunct locomotive manufacturer

Coordinates: 40.718°N 84.110°W

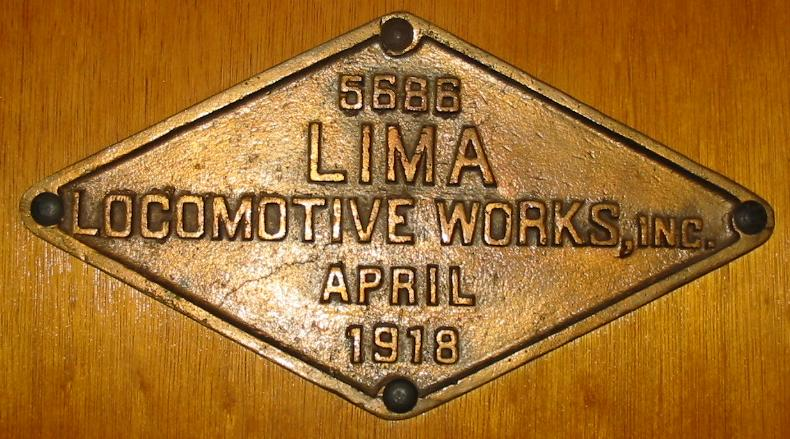
- Lima builder's plate, 1918
- Industry: Locomotive manufacturing
- Predecessor: Lima Machine Works
- Founded: 1877
- Fate: Merged with Baldwin Locomotive Works in September 1951
- Successor: Lima-Hamilton Corporation (July 1947) Baldwin-Lima-Hamilton Corporation (September 1951)
- Headquarters: Lima, Ohio, United States

Lima Locomotive Works (LLW) was an American firm that manufactured railroad locomotives from the 1870s through the 1950s. The company's name is derived from the location of its main manufacturing plant in Lima, Ohio (/ˈlaɪmə/ LY-mə). The shops were located between the Erie Railroad main line, the Baltimore & Ohio's Cincinnati-Toledo main line and the Nickel Plate Road main line and shops.

The company produced the Shay geared logging steam locomotive, developed by Ephraim Shay, and for William E. Woodard's "Super Power" advanced steam locomotive concept – exemplified by the prototype 2-8-4 Berkshire, Lima demonstrator A-1. In World War II the Lima plant produced the M4A1 version of the M4 Sherman tank.

== History ==
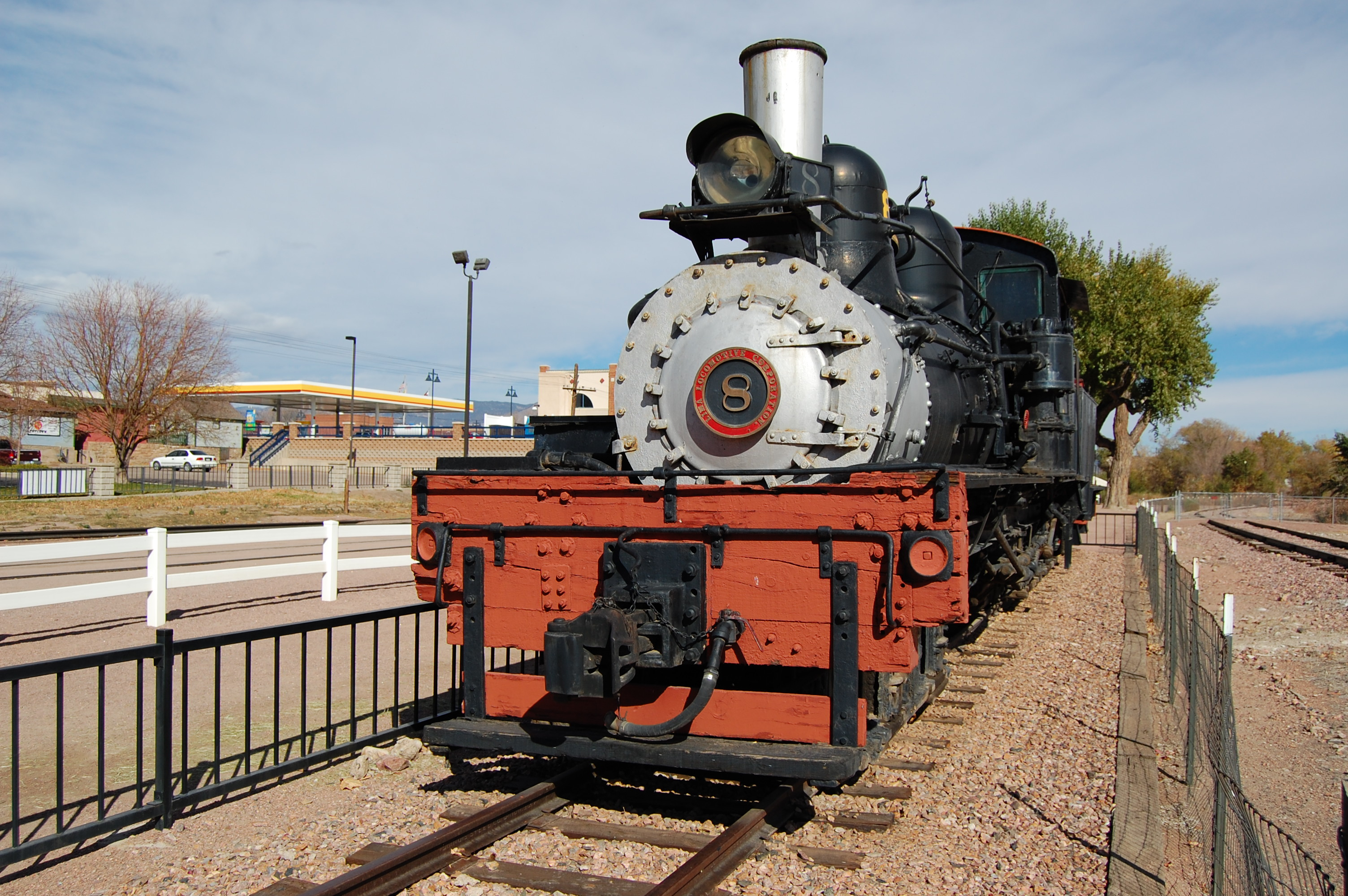
1922 Shay locomotive, West Side Lumber Co. #8, on display in Cañon City, Colorado

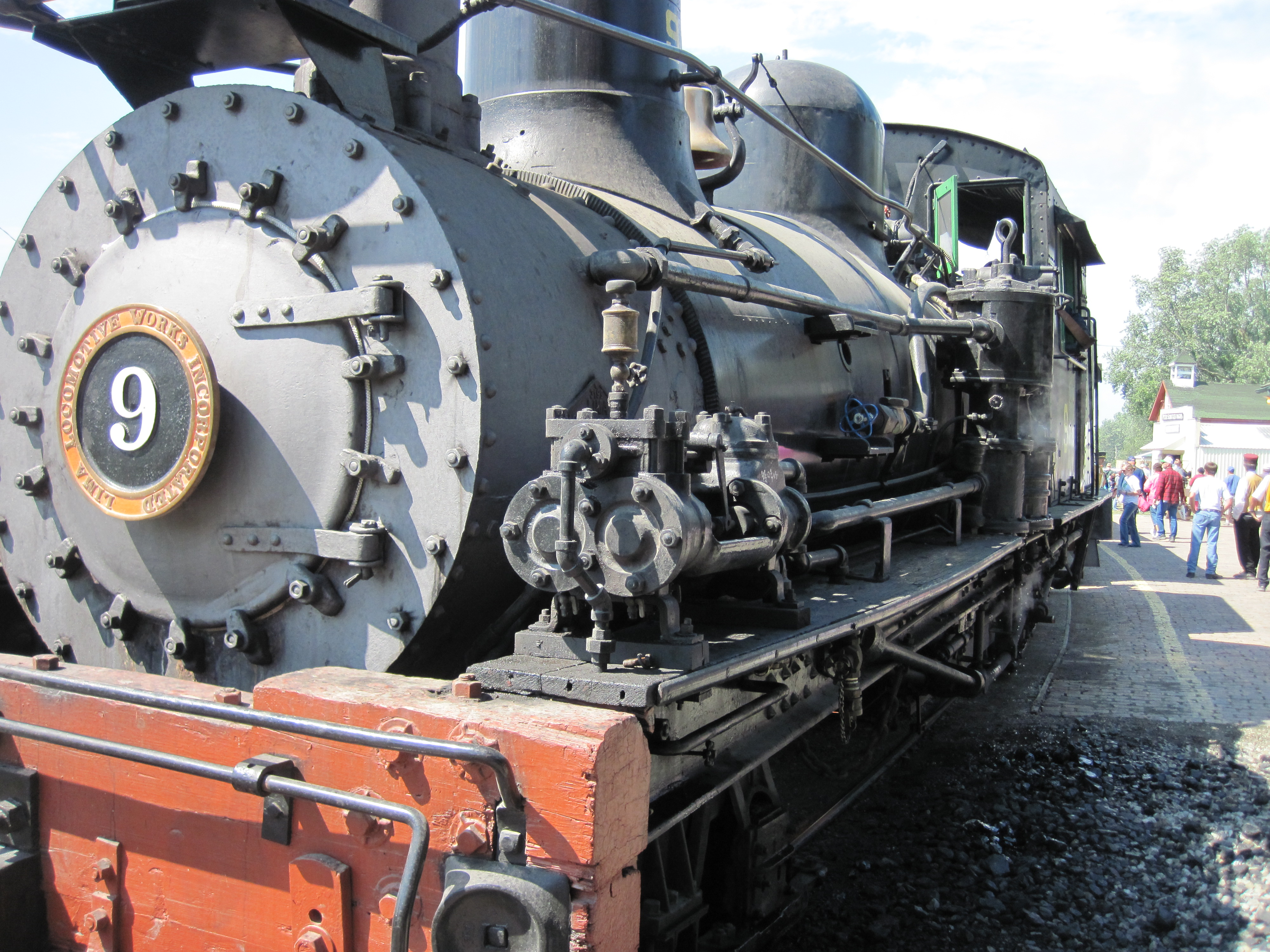
1923 Shay locomotive, West Side Lumber Co. #9, in service on the Midwest Central Railroad

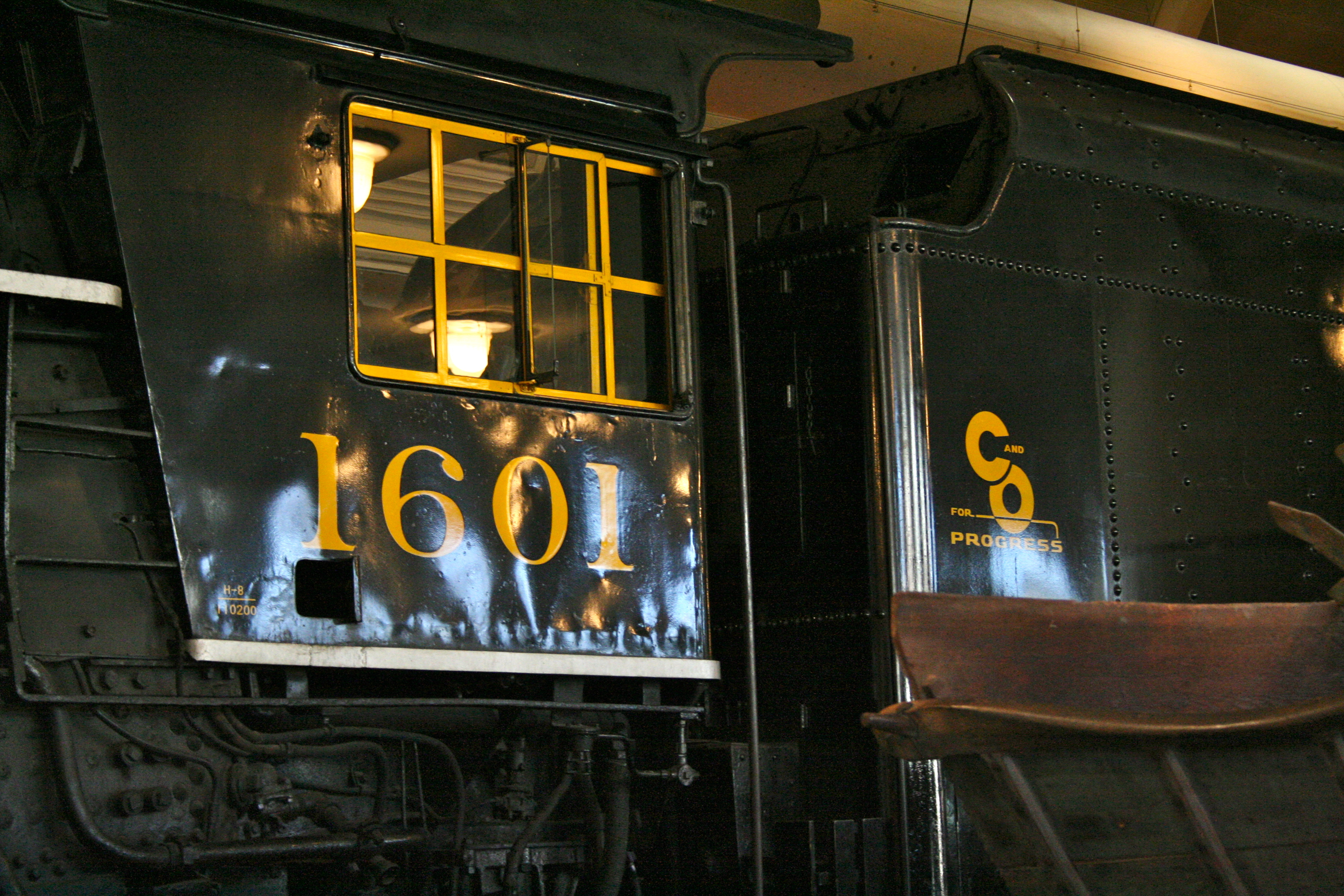
Side view of the gap between Chesapeake & Ohio 2-6-6-6 "Allegheny" Type Locomotive 1601 and its tender on display at the Henry Ford Museum

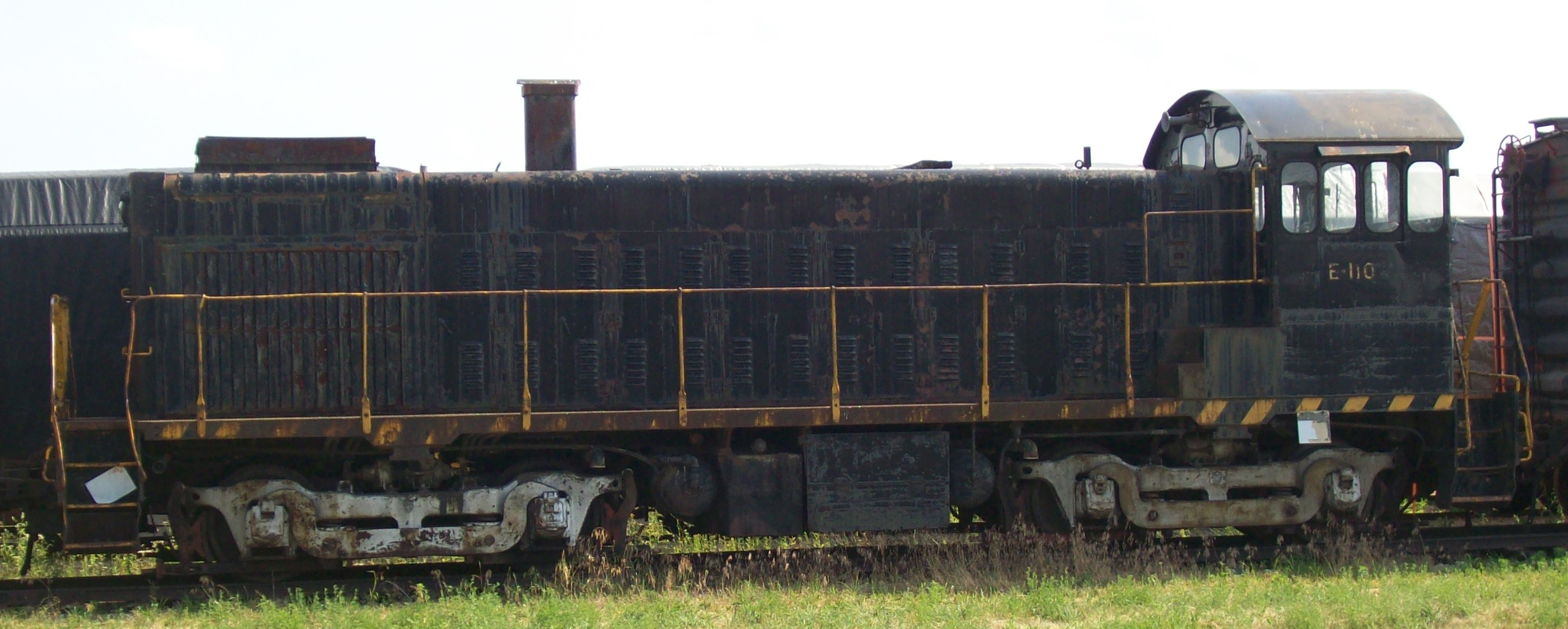
Surviving example of a Lima-Hamilton LS-1200 diesel-electric locomotive at the Illinois Railway Museum in Union, Illinois

In 1878, James Alley contracted the Lima Machine Works to build a steam locomotive that Ephraim Shay had designed. In April 1880, Lima rebuilt Ephraim Shay's original design, using vertically side-mounted pistons mounted on the right, connected to a drive line on the outside of the trucks. The Shay was geared down to provide more slow-moving, pulling ability for use in the lumber industry. The first Shay locomotive was built in 1880; it was such a success that many people in the lumber industry wanted one. To accommodate the new demand for the locomotive, Shay licensed the right to build his locomotive to the Lima Machine Works, which expanded and began to ship Shay locomotives to lumbermen across the frontier. Two years later, locomotives were the main product being produced by the Lima Machine Works, which would produce over 300 locomotives during the next ten years.

After a serious fire, a new shop was opened in 1902 and Shay production continued. Then, with initial demand for low-speed geared locomotives well on the way to being sated, and the new facilities in place, Lima moved into the heavy locomotive field.

== Super Power ==
Success returned to Lima in the 1920s with the new concept of "Super Power" developed by Lima's mechanical engineer William E. Woodard. By making a number of significant changes to maximize a steam locomotive's capacity to generate and utilize steam, Woodard was able to make such locomotives significantly more powerful and faster. He did this by starting in 1922 with the H-10 experimental heavy 2-8-2 design for the New York Central (Michigan Central 8000) and applying both relatively new science (the Cole ratios), and every efficiency-enhancing tool available – a larger firebox, increased superheat, a feedwater heater, improved drafting, higher boiler pressure, streamlined steam passages and a trailing-truck booster engine, and by applying limited cutoff (the range of steam valve admission settings) to prevent locomotive engineers from using excessive steam at starting. The 2-8-2 thus produced was demonstrated to be 26% more efficient overall than its immediate predecessor, and the NYC bought 301 locomotives.

A large increase in firebox area (from 66 square feet (6.1 m^{2}) on the H-10 to 100 square feet (9.3 m^{2}) on the A-1), characteristic of his work, necessitated adding another axle to the trailing truck, thus creating the 2-8-4 wheel arrangement. Built in the spring of 1925, the demonstrator owned by Lima was dubbed the A-1. In addition to supporting the very large firebox and grate, the four-wheeled trailing truck carried the ash pan. For this purpose, the truck was redesigned as an articulated extension of the locomotive frame. The result was an ash pan that could hold more ash, allowing the locomotive to travel farther between cleanings. For roads that burned coal, this was a significant innovation. But it was not without tradeoffs. The articulated frame reduced weight on the driving wheels, which did not aid tractive effort (pulling ability). The locomotives so configured also had more difficulty staying on the rails in reverse, particularly through yard trackwork like switch frogs.

The locomotive quickly proved to be 26-30% more efficient than the New York Central H-10. After a highly successful series of tests in the mid-1920s it was sent around the country to make the idea of "Super Power" known. The first forty-five were purchased by New York Central's subsidiary Boston & Albany following initial road testing across the summit of the Berkshire Hills, and so the 2-8-4 wheel arrangement came to be known as the "Berkshire" on most railroads. The prototype itself was later sold to the Illinois Central as part of an order for 50 similar locomotives. Woodard summed up "Super Power" by defining it as "horsepower at speed". Previous design principles emphasized tractive effort (pulling ability) rather than speed. By 1949 some 613 Berkshires had been constructed for North American service, of which 20 are preserved – at least two in operating condition (Nickel Plate Road 765 and Pere Marquette 1225), both Lima products.

There were at least three successive waves of "Super Power". The first began with the New York Central 8000 and the A-1, and included Missouri Pacific 2-8-4s and Texas & Pacific 2-10-4s. These locomotives had conventional 63" driving wheels. In 1927, the Erie Railroad took delivery of a "second-phase" Berkshire with 70" driving wheels, capable not only of great power but higher speed; in turn, this design evolved into the Chesapeake & Ohio T-1 2-10-4s of 1930, with 69" driving wheels. The "third-phase" of the later 1930s and war years can be identified with locomotives such as the homebuilt N&W 2-6-6-4s, C&O/Virginian 2-6-6-6 and virtually all American 4-8-4s. Boiler pressures rose as high as 310 lbs/sq.in.; thermic siphons added to the firebox and combustion chamber added 8% to the efficiency of the boiler; roller bearings appeared on main axle boxes and sometimes on running gear. And the "Super Power" concept had extended to other builders such as Alco (the Union Pacific Big Boy) and Baldwin (the Santa Fe 5001- and 5011-class 2-10-4s). The four-wheel trailing truck became the standard for large locomotives (i.e., 4-8-4, 2-10-4, 4-6-6-4, 2-8-8-4), though the articulated main frame did not. Many railroads, particularly roads like the Santa Fe (which favored oil-burning locomotives and, therefore, did not need the oversized ash pan), adopted many of the "Super Power" features but utilized a conventional full frame and separate trailing truck.

The construction of the first 2-8-4 locomotive is documented in David Weitzman's book, Superpower: Making of a steam locomotive. David also explains some of the innovations it made at the time.

== World War II production ==
The first production of the Sherman Tank took place at the Lima Locomotive Works and was first used in 1941, with many early vehicles reserved for British use under Lend-Lease; the first production Sherman was given to the U.S. Army for evaluation, and the second tank went to London.

== Decline ==
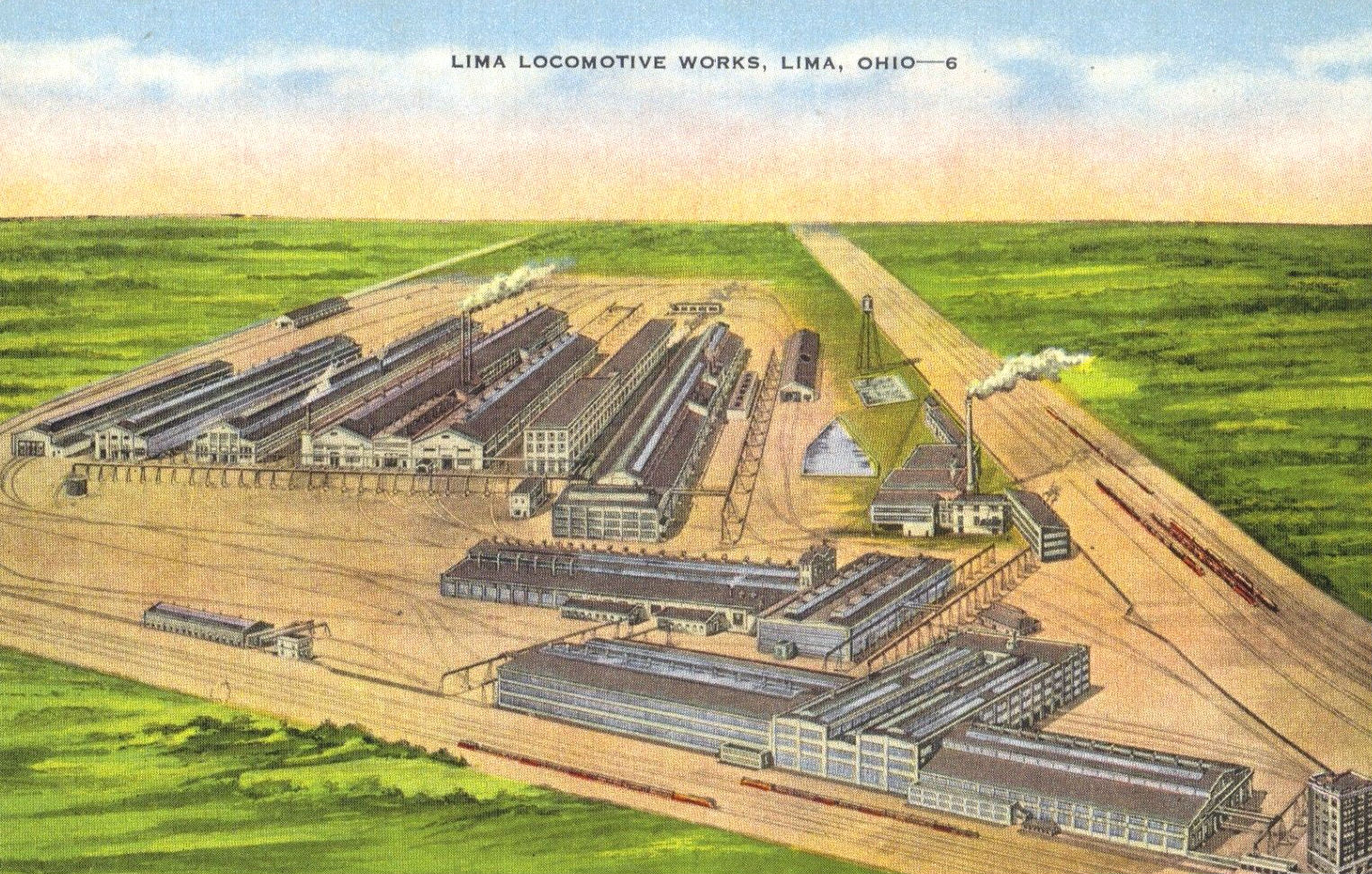
The Lima factory

While delivering the first group of 2-6-6-6 locomotives in 1941, Lima miscalculated and misrepresented the locomotives' weight. Maintenance crews recalculated the weight, and discovered that the H-8s weighed 771,300 pounds (349,900 kg), which was thousands of pounds heavier than Lima first claimed. The train crews that worked with the H-8s, who were getting paid based on the locomotives' weight on the driving wheels at the time, started seeing this misrepresentation as an attack on their livelihood. The C&O was forced to pay their crews thousands of dollars to make up for lost payment, and they subsequently sued Lima for over $3 million in 1944. Lima also lost their pride in building fine machinery, and they would subsequently lose more money within the following years.

In April 1947, the firm merged with General Machinery Corporation of Hamilton, Ohio, to form the Lima-Hamilton Corporation.

Lima-Hamilton’s last steam locomotive was Nickel Plate Road No. 779, a 2-8-4 "Berkshire", which left the erecting halls in May 1949. That same year, Lima promoted a new wheel arrangement, the 4-8-6. This would have allowed an even larger firebox than the 4-8-4. No example of the type was built, however.

From 1949 to 1951, Lima-Hamilton produced a total of 175 diesel locomotives, in 7 different models.

In 1951, Lima-Hamilton merged with Baldwin Locomotive Works to form Baldwin-Lima-Hamilton (BLH). The Lima-Hamilton line of diesels was discontinued, in favor of Baldwin's existing line. Though Lima and Baldwin had been known for high-quality steam locomotives, their line of diesel-electric locomotives was unable to compete with EMD, Alco, and GE. BLH left the locomotive business in 1956.

For a time, Clark Equipment Company manufactured Lima-brand construction cranes in the old plant. Most of the company's records and builder's drawings have been transferred and are housed in the California State Railroad Museum's library in Sacramento, California.

=== Preserved steam locomotives ===
Many Lima-built steam locomotives have been preserved across the United States and around the world. Numerous Lima-built engines are still operational, especially Shay-type locomotives, examples of which operate at the Colorado Railroad Museum, the Cass Scenic Railroad, the Georgetown Loop Railroad, the Mount Rainier Scenic Railroad, and the Roaring Camp and Big Trees Narrow Gauge Railroad. Other widely known preserved Lima-built steam locomotives include Southern Pacific 4449, Nickel Plate Road 765, Pere Marquette 1225, Chesapeake and Ohio 614, Texas and Pacific 610, Atlanta and West Point 290, Boston and Maine 3713, Philippine National Railways 105, Tioga Lumber Company Shay C/N 1568 in Harrod, Ohio, and Chesapeake & Ohio 1601 - an Allegheny locomotive displayed indoors at The Henry Ford Museum in Dearborn, Michigan.

Examples of preserved Lima-built locomotives outside of the U.S. include the USATC S160 Class 5197 at the Churnet Valley Railway in Staffordshire, UK, as well as a former US Army 0-6-0 switcher no. 4076 built in 1944 that resides at the Heritage Park Historical Village in Calgary, Alberta.

== Timeline ==
- 1877: Lima Machine Works is established to produce agricultural and sawmill equipment.
- 1878: Lima Machine Works builds the first Shay type locomotive.
- 1892: Lima Machine Works reorganizes and emerges as Lima Locomotive & Machine Company.
- 1911: Lima begins manufacturing locomotives for Class I railroads.
- 1912: Another reorganization and Lima emerges as Lima Locomotive Corporation.
- 1916: Joel Coffin and Samuel G. Allen purchase Lima; the company is renamed Lima Locomotive Works.
- 1922: Woodard's 2-8-2 NYC 8000, ancestor of "Super Power", is delivered.
- 1925: Woodard's A-1, the prototype "Super Power" Berkshire type, takes to the rails.
- 1942: Lima Locomotive Works was first company that started manufacturing M4A1 Sherman in February 1942 for British use.
- 1944: Lima was sued for over 3 million dollars by the C&O. This lawsuit would kickstart Lima’s decline.
- 1947: Lima is merged with General Machinery Corporation of Hamilton, Ohio. The new company is named Lima-Hamilton Corporation on July 30, 1947.
- 1949: L-H’s last steam locomotive (NKP 779) is completed on May 13, 1949. Lima-Hamilton begins production of Diesel locomotives. Unsuccessful promotion of the 4-8-6. Production of Cranes and other construction equipment continues at the Lima plant.
- 1951: Lima-Hamilton is merged with Baldwin Locomotive Works on September 11, 1951. The new company is named Baldwin-Lima-Hamilton Corporation. L-H completes its last diesel, Pennsylvania Railroad A-3177 #5683 on September 12, 1951.
- 1956: Baldwin-Lima-Hamilton exits the locomotive market on May 5, 1956, BLH completes its last diesel, Kaiser Bauxite Company RS-12 #104, exported to Jamaica.
- 1972: Baldwin-Lima-Hamilton goes bankrupt in April, its assets are acquired by the Greyhound Corporation.
- 1980: Production of cranes and construction equipment ends, Lima factory closed and sold.
- 1998: The former Lima erecting shed and heavy Shay shops are torn down and broken up.

== See also ==
- List of Lima-Hamilton diesel locomotives
