= List of interurban railways in North America =

This is a list of interurban railways in North America. Elsewhere, the term was not used or did not have the same meaning. The vast majority of these systems are defunct. All were opened primarily as passenger carriers, although many survived as freight railways after passenger service ceased.

== Canada ==
Provinces not listed did not have interurban systems, which were commonly called radial railways in Canada.

=== Alberta ===
Name	Date (From)	Date (To)	Notes
Calgary Municipal Railway			

=== British Columbia ===
Name	Date (From)	Date (To)	Notes
British Columbia Electric Railway			

=== Manitoba ===
Name	Date (From)	Date (To)	Notes
Winnipeg Electric Company			
Winnipeg, Selkirk and Lake Winnipeg Railway			

=== Nova Scotia ===
Name	Date (From)	Date (To)	Notes
Cape Breton Electric Company			earlier Sydney and Glace Bay Railway; later Cape Breton Tramways
Pictou County Electric Company			

=== Ontario ===
Name	Date (From)	Date (To)	Notes
Brantford and Hamilton Electric Railway	1908	1931	Cataract radial.
Brantford Municipal Railway			
Chatham, Wallaceburg and Lake Erie Railway	1894	1930	passenger service ceased in 1927
Galt and Preston Street Railway	1894	1895	Renamed to Galt, Preston and Hespeler Street Railway.
Galt, Preston and Hespeler Street Railway	1895	1914	Merged into the Grand River Railway.
Grand River Railway	1914	1961	Came under Canadian Pacific Electric Lines. Regular passenger service ended in 1955. System was dieselized in the early 1960s.
Grand Valley Railway	1904	1929	Predecessor of the Lake Erie and Northern Railway.
Hamilton and Dundas Street Railway	1896	1923	Cataract radial.
Hamilton, Grimsby and Beamsville Electric Railway	1896	1931	
Hamilton Radial Electric Railway	1897	1929	Cataract radial.
Lake Erie and Northern Railway	1916	1955	
London and Port Stanley Railway	1915	1957	Freight service continued
Mount McKay and Kakabeka Falls Railway			
Niagara Falls Park and River Railway	1893	1932	
Niagara, St. Catharines and Toronto Railway	1888	1959	Freight service continued
Nipissing Central Railway			
North Yonge Railways			
Sandwich, Windsor and Amherstburg Railway	1886	1938	
Schomberg and Aurora Railway			
South Western Traction Company	1906	1918	Later London and Lake Erie Railway and Transportation Company
Sudbury and Copper Cliff Suburban Electric Railway	1915	1950	
Toronto Eastern Railway			
Toronto and Mimico Electric Railway and Light Company			
Toronto and Scarboro' Electric Railway, Light and Power Company			
Toronto and York Radial Railway	1885	1927	
Toronto Suburban Railway	1890s	1931	
Windsor, Essex and Lake Shore Rapid Railway	1907	1932	
Woodstock, Thames Valley and Ingersoll Electric Railway	1900	1925	

=== Quebec ===
Name	Date (From)	Date (To)	Notes
Hull Electric Company			
Montreal and Southern Counties Railway	1909	1956	
Montreal Tramways Company	1911	1951	Continued as the Montreal Transportation Commission until 1959
Quebec Railway, Light and Power Company	1904	1959	Operated under Canadian National Railway 1951 – 1959

== Cuba ==
Name	Date (From)	Date (To)	Notes
Ferrocarril Cubano de Hershey	1917	Present	

== Mexico ==
Name	Date (From)	Date (To)	Notes
Ferrocarril Electrico de Lerdo a Torreon			
Ferrocarril Electrico de Tampico a la Barra			
Ferrocarril Mexicano			Jalapa Branch, not electrified
Servicio de Transportes Eléctricos			

== United States ==
=== Alabama ===
Name	Date (From)	Date (To)	Notes
Alabama Power Company			
Birmingham Railway and Electric Company			
Mobile Light and Railroad Company			

=== Arizona ===
Name	Date (From)	Date (To)	Notes
Douglas Street Railway			
Phoenix Railway of Arizona			
Warren–Bisbee Railway	March 12, 1908	May 31, 1928	Operated by Warren Company

=== Arkansas ===
Name	Date (From)	Date (To)	Notes
Central Power and Light Company			
Fort Smith Light and Traction Company			
West Helena Consolidated Company			Also Interurban Traction Company

=== California ===
Name	Date (From)	Date (To)	Notes
Central California Traction Company	1907	1933	
Fresno Traction Company	1914	1918	
Glendale and Montrose Railway	1913	1930	
Key System	1903	1958	Earlier San Francisco – Oakland Terminal Railways
Nevada County Traction Company	c. 1901	1923	
Northwestern Pacific Railroad	1903	1941	Earlier North Pacific Coast Railroad
Ocean Shore Railroad	1905	1920	Never electrified outside of San Francisco
Pacific Coast Railway		1933	
Pacific Electric Railway	1902	1961	
Peninsular Railway	1910	1934	
Petaluma and Santa Rosa Railroad	1904	1932	
Sacramento Northern Railway	1905	1941	Earlier Northern Electric Railway, Northern Electric Railway—Marysville and Colusa Branch, Oakland, Antioch and Eastern Railway, and San Francisco–Sacramento Railroad
Sacramento Valley Electric Railroad	1915	1917	
San Diego Electric Railway			
San Diego Southern Railway			
San Francisco Municipal Railway	1903	1949	Earlier San Francisco and San Mateo Electric Railway, United Railroads of San Francisco, Market Street Railway, continues as intra-urban service
San Francisco, Napa and Calistoga Railway	1905	1937	Later San Francisco and Napa Valley Railroad
Shipyard Railway	1943	1945	
Southern Pacific Company	1911	1941	East Bay Electric Lines, earlier Interurban Electric Railway
Tidewater Southern Railway	1913	1932	
Visalia Electric Railroad	1906	1924	
Watsonville Traction Company	1910	1917	

=== Colorado ===
Name	Date (From)	Date (To)	Notes
Colorado Springs and Cripple Creek District Railway			
Colorado Springs and Interurban Railway			
Denver and Intermountain Railroad	1909	1950	Largely rehabilitated as the Regional Transportation District W Line light rail in the 2010s
Denver and Interurban Railroad	1908	1926	
Denver and South Platte Railway			
Durango Railway and Realty Company			
Grand River Valley Railroad			
Trinidad Electric Transmission, Railway and Gas Company			

=== Connecticut ===
Name	Date (From)	Date (To)	Notes
Bristol and Plainville Electric Company			
Connecticut Company	1907		Consolidation of several street and interurban railways — see article
Danbury and Bethel Street Railway	1887	1926	
Hartford and Springfield Street Railway			
Shore Line Electric Railway	1910	1923	Some services acquired by the Connecticut Company
Waterbury and Milldale Tramway	November 19, 1913	October 29, 1933	

=== Delaware ===
Name	Date (From)	Date (To)	Notes
Wilmington and Philadelphia Traction Company			Used standard streetcar technology

=== District of Columbia ===
Name	Date (From)	Date (To)	Notes
Washington Railway and Electric Company			

=== Georgia ===
Name	Date (From)	Date (To)	Notes
Atlanta Northern Railway	July 17, 1905	1947	
Augusta–Aiken Railway and Electric Corporation	1902	1929	
Fairburn and Atlanta Railway and Electric Company			
Georgia Railway and Power Company			
Savannah Electric and Power Company			

=== Idaho ===
Name	Date (From)	Date (To)	Notes
Boise Valley Traction Company			
Caldwell Traction Company			
Lewiston–Clarkston Transit Company			
Sandpoint and Interurban Railway			
Utah Idaho Central			

=== Illinois ===
Name	Date (From)	Date (To)	Notes
Alton, Granite and St. Louis Traction Company			
Alton, Jacksonville and Peoria Railway			Never reached Jacksonville and Peoria
Amboy Electric Interurban Railroad			
Aurora, Elgin and Fox River Electric Company		1972	Earlier Elgin, Aurora and Southern Traction Company; passenger service ended March 31, 1935, converted to diesel in 1947
Aurora, Plainfield and Joliet Railroad	October 21, 1904		
Bloomington, Pontiac and Joliet Electric Railway			Never reached Bloomington and Joliet
Cairo and St. Louis Railway			
Central Illinois Traction Company			
Chicago, Aurora and DeKalb Railroad	1906	1923	Earlier Aurora, DeKalb and Rockford Electric Traction Company
Chicago Aurora and Elgin Railroad	August 25, 1902	June 10, 1959	Earlier Aurora Elgin and Chicago Railway; passenger service ended July 3, 1957
Chicago, Harvard and Geneva Lake Railway	1899	1930	Linked Harvard with Fontana, connected with C&NW Northwest Line; interurbans never paralleled the Northwest Line
Chicago and Interurban Traction Company	c. 1910	April 23, 1927	Earlier Chicago and Southern Traction Company
Chicago and Joliet Electric Railway			
Chicago North Shore and Milwaukee Railroad	c. May 1895	January 21, 1963	Earlier Chicago and Milwaukee Electric Railroad
Chicago, Ottawa and Peoria Railway	1904	1934	Later Chicago and Illinois Valley Railroad
Chicago South Shore and South Bend Railroad	July 1, 1908	Present	Earlier Chicago, Lake Shore and South Bend Railway; later South Shore Line
Chicago and Southern Traction Company	1907	c. 1911	Later Chicago and Interurban Traction Company
Coal Belt Electric Railway			
DeKalb – Sycamore and Interurban Traction Company	1902	August 1924	Linked Chicago Aurora and DeKalb with Woodstock and Sycamore.
East St. Louis, Columbia and Waterloo Railway			
East St. Louis and Suburban Railway			
Elgin and Belvidere Electric Company	February 2, 1907	March 10, 1930	Later Elgin, Belvidere and Rockford Railway
Fox and Illinois Union Railway	1911	1931	Linked AE&FR with J&O
Galesburg Railway, Lighting and Power Company			
Galesburg and Kewanee Electric Railway			
Illinois Central Electric Railway		July 25, 1925	
Illinois Traction System		March 3, 1956	Later Illinois Terminal Railroad
Joliet and Eastern Traction Company	1909	1923	Linked C&J and J&O with C&I
Joliet, Plainfield and Aurora Railroad			Later Joliet and Southern Traction Company and Aurora, Plainfield and Joliet Railroad
Kanakee and Urbana Traction Company	December 20, 1912	March 26, 1926	Never reached Kankakee
Keokuk Electric Company			
Lee County Central Electric Railway	December 10, 1910		Earlier Northern Illinois Electric Railway; passenger service abandoned 1915
Murphysboro and Southern Illinois Railway			
Peoples' Traction Company			
Peoria and Pekin Terminal Railway			Later Peoria Railway Terminal Company
Rock Island Southern Railroad			
Rock Island Southern Railway	1906	1926	
Rockford and Interurban Railway			Linked Freeport, Belvidere, and Janesville. Planned extension to Oregon and Dixon never built.
St. Louis and Belleville Electric Railway			
Southern Illinois Railway and Power Company			
Springfield, Clear Lake and Rochester Railway	1909	1912	Later Mississippi Valley Interurban Railway
Sterling, Dixon and Eastern Traction Company			
Woodstock and Sycamore Traction Company	1911	1918	Planned extension to Woodstock never built.

=== Indiana ===
Name	Date (From)	Date (To)	Notes
Angola Railway and Power Company			
Beech Grove Traction Company			
Bluffton, Geneva and Celina Traction Company			Never reached Celina
Chicago South Shore and South Bend Railroad	July 1, 1908	Present	Earlier Chicago, Lake Shore and South Bend Railway; later South Shore Line
Evansville and Ohio Valley Railway			
Evansville Suburban and Newburgh Railway			
Fort Wayne and Decatur Traction Company			
Fort Wayne and Northwestern Railway			Earlier Toledo and Chicago Interurban Railway
Fort Wayne and Wabash Valley Traction Company			
Garrett, Auburn and Northern Electric Railroad	February 22, 1906		
Gary Railways			Earlier Gary Street Railway, Gary and Valparaiso Railway, and Chicago – New York Electric Air Line Railroad
Gary and Hobart Traction Company			
Gary and Southern Traction Company			
Goshen, South Bend and Chicago Railroad			
Indiana Railroad		September 8, 1941	Earlier Interstate Public Service Company, Indiana Service Corporation, Northern Indiana Power Company, Terre Haute, Indianapolis and Eastern Traction Company
Indianapolis and Cincinnati Traction Company	February 20, 1905	January 1932	Later Indianapolis and Southeastern Railroad
Lafayette Street Railway			
Lebanon–Thorntown Traction Company			
Marion and Bluffton Traction Company	1907		Also Marion Bluffton and Eastern Traction Company
Northern Indiana Railway		1934	Later Chicago, South Bend and Northern Indiana Railway. Local streetcar service in South Bend continued until 1940.
St. Joseph Valley Traction Company	1910	April 17, 1918	
Southern Indiana Gas and Electric Company	December 8, 1903	1933	
Union Traction Company			
Winona Interurban Railway	1902	September 1, 1934	Freight services continued until May 31, 1952

=== Iowa ===
Name	Date (From)	Date (To)	Notes
Albia Interurban Railway			Later Albia Light and Railway Company
Cedar Rapids and Iowa City Railway			
Cedar Rapids and Marion City Railway			
Charles City Western Railway			
Clinton, Davenport and Muscatine Railway	1926	1940	Earlier Iowa and Illinois Railway (1904), and Davenport and Muscatine Railway (1912)
Des Moines and Central Iowa Railroad			
Fort Dodge, Des Moines and Southern Railway	November 1907		
Iowa Railway and Light Company			
Keokuk Electric Company			
Mason City and Clear Lake Railroad			
Oskaloosa and Buxton Electric Railway			
Oskaloosa Traction and Light Company			
Southern Iowa Railway			Earlier Iowa Southern Utilities Company
Tama and Toledo Railroad	February 3, 1894	1953	Passenger service abandoned 1925
Waterloo, Cedar Falls and Northern Railway			

=== Kansas ===
Name	Date (From)	Date (To)	Notes
Arkansas Valley Interurban Railway	1910	1938	
Iola Electric Railway	1901	March 1919	
Joplin and Pittsburg Railway	1907	c. 1930s	Freight traffic continued until 1951
Junction City and Fort Riley Railway			
Kansas City, Clay County and St. Joseph Railway	1913	1933	
Kansas City, Kaw Valley and Western Railway	1914	1949	Later Kansas City, Kaw Valley Railroad. Freight traffic continued until 1963
Kansas City, Lawrence and Topeka Railway	1903	1934	Earlier Kansas City and Olathe Electric Railway; later Kansas City, Merriam and Shawnee Railroad
Kansas City, Leavenworth and Western Railway	January 16, 1900	March 31, 1938	
Manhattan City and Interurban Railway	1914	1926	
Missouri and Kansas Interurban Railway	1906	July 9, 1940	
Southwestern Interurban Railway			
Union Traction Company	1904	1947	Later Union Electric Railway
Westmoreland Interurban Railroad			

=== Kentucky ===
Name	Date (From)	Date (To)	Notes
Kentucky Traction and Terminal Company			
Louisville and Interurban Railroad	1904	1935	
Louisville and Eastern Railway	1901	1911	Bought by L&I

=== Louisiana ===
Name	Date (From)	Date (To)	Notes
Orleans–Kenner Electric Railway			
St. Tammany Railway and Power Company			
Southwestern Traction Company			

=== Maine ===
Name	Date (From)	Date (To)	Notes
Androscoggin and Kennebec Railway			Earlier Lewiston, Augusa and Waterville Street Railway
Aroostook Valley Railroad	July 1, 1910	1930s	
Atlantic Shore Line Railway			
Bangor Railway and Electric Company			
Biddeford and Saco Railroad			
Cumberland County Power and Light Company			Earlier Portland Railroad
Lewiston, Augusta and Waterville Street Railway			
Portland–Lewiston Interurban	July 7, 1914	June 29, 1933	Androscoggin Electric Company
Rockland, Thomaston and Camden Street Railway			

=== Maryland ===
Name	Date (From)	Date (To)	Notes
Cumberland and Westernport Electric Railway			
Kensington Railway			
Hagerstown and Frederick Railway	August 22, 1896	February 20, 1954	Later Potomac Public Service Company
United Railways and Electric Company			
Washington, Baltimore and Annapolis Electric Railway	1908	August 20, 1935	Later Baltimore and Annapolis Railroad
Washington Interurban Railway			

=== Massachusetts ===
Name	Date (From)	Date (To)	Notes
Attleboro Branch Railroad			
Berkshire Street Railway			
Blue Hill Street Railway			
Boston and Worcester Street Railway			
Bristol County Street Railway			
Concord, Maynard and Hudson Street Railway			
Connecticut Valley Street Railway	1895	1934	Merged from of Montague, Greenfield & Turners Falls, Amherst & Northampton, Greenfield & Northampton Street Railways in 1905, dissolved 1924. Greenfield-Montague Transportation Area (GMTA) operated streetcars until 1934. Bus service merged with Franklin Regional Transit Authority.
Eastern Massachusetts Street Railway			Earlier Bay State Street Railway
Fitchburg and Leominster Street Railway			
Grafton and Upton Railroad			
Holyoke Street Railway	1884	1937	Purchased and operated lines of Amherst-Sunderland Street Railway, Hampshire Street Railway; operated Mount Tom Railroad as subsidiary. Established and operated Mountain Park. Continued operations as bus line until 1987; assets liquidated in 1991.
Interstate Consolidated Street Railway			
Lowell and Fitchburg Street Railway			
Massachusetts Northeastern Street Railway			
Medway and Dedham Street Railway			
Middlesex and Boston Street Railway			
Milford, Attleboro and Woonsocket Street Railway			
Milford and Uxbridge Street Railway			
Nahant and Lynn Street Railway			
New Bedford and Onset Street Railway			
Northampton Street Railway	1866	1933	Continued operations as bus line until 1951.
Northern Massachusetts Street Railway			
Norton, Taunton and Attleboro Street Railway			
Plymouth and Brockton Street Railway	1888	1928	Last remaining street railway company in the Commonwealth, continues operations as private regional bus transportation provider.
Plymouth and Sandwich Street Railway			
Shelburne Falls and Colrain Street Railway	1896	1927	SF&C car #10 continues to operate at Shelburne Falls Trolley Museum.
Springfield Street Railway	1870	1940	Continued operations as bus line, merged into Springfield Area Transit Company of the Pioneer Valley Transit Authority in 1981.
Union Street Railway			
Ware and Brookfield Street Railway			
Worcester Consolidated Street Railway			

=== Michigan ===
Michigan had 981 miles (1,579 km) of interurban.

Name	Date (From)	Date (To)	Notes
Ann Arbor and Ypsilanti Street Railway			
Benton Harbor – St. Joe Railway and Light Company			
Detroit, Jackson and Chicago Railway			
Detroit, Lake Shore and Mt. Clemens Railway			
Detroit, Monroe and Toledo Short Line Railway			Later Eastern Michigan – Toledo Railroad
Detroit United Railway			Later Eastern Michigan Railways
Escanaba Traction Company			Later Escanaba Power and Traction Company
Grand Rapids, Grand Haven and Muskegon Railway	1902	April 18, 1928	
Grand Rapids, Holland and Chicago Railway			Never reached Chicago
Houghton County Traction Company	1900	May 21, 1932	
Lake Superior District Power Company			
Lansing, St. Johns and St. Louis Railway			
Michigan Railway			Later Michigan Railroad
Michigan United Railways			Later Michigan Electric Railway
Saginaw – Bay City Railway			
Southern Michigan Railway			Later Northern Indiana Railway

=== Minnesota ===
Name	Date (From)	Date (To)	Notes
Electric Short Line Railway	1913	1947	Not electrified
Mesaba Railway	December 24, 1912	April 16, 1927	
Minneapolis, Anoka and Cuyuna Range Railroad			
Minneapolis Municipal Waterworks Railway			While not technically an interurban railway, since it did not connect two cities, it was a freight and passenger hauling electric railway
Minneapolis, St. Paul, Rochester and Dubuque Electric Traction Company			Not electrified; later Minneapolis, Northfield and Southern Railway
Minnesota Northwestern Electric Railway	1914	1940	Not electrified
St. Paul Southern Electric Railway	November 17, 1914	July 31, 1928	
Twin City Rapid Transit Company			

=== Mississippi ===
Name	Date (From)	Date (To)	Notes
Gulfport and Mississippi Coast Traction Company			
Laurel Light and Railway Company			

=== Missouri ===
Name	Date (From)	Date (To)	Notes
Jefferson City Bridge and Transit Company			
Kansas City, Clay County and St. Joseph Railway			
Kansas City, Kaw Valley and Western Railway			Later Kansas City, Kaw Valley Railroad
Kansas City, Lawrence and Topeka Railway			Earlier Kansas City and Olathe Electric Railway; later Kansas City, Merriam and Shawnee Railroad
Kansas City, Leavenworth and Western Railway			
Kansas City, Ozarks and Southern Railway			
Kansas City Power and Light Company			
Manhattan City and Interurban Railway			
Mexico Investment and Construction Company			Earlier Mexico, Santa Fe and Perry Traction Company
Missouri Electric Railroad			
Missouri and Kansas Interurban Railway			
Oregon Interurban Railway			
St. Francois County Railroad			
St. Joseph and Savannah Interurban Railway			
Southwest Missouri Electric Railway			Later Southwest Missouri Railroad
Union Depot, Bridge and Terminal Railroad			
United Railways of St. Louis			

=== Montana ===
Name	Date (From)	Date (To)	Notes
Anaconda Copper Mining Company			
Gallatin Valley Railway			

=== Nebraska ===
Name	Date (From)	Date (To)	Notes
Omaha and Lincoln Railway and Light Company			
Omaha and Southern Interurban Railway			
Omaha, Lincoln and Beatrice Railway			Remains in operation as a switching railroad

=== New Hampshire ===
Name	Date (From)	Date (To)	Notes
Berlin Street Railway			
Boston and Maine Railroad			Concord and Manchester Electric Branch; later Concord Electric Railways
Claremont Railway			
Dover, Somerset and Rochester Street Railway			
Exeter, Hampton and Amesbury Street Railway			
Manchester and Derry Street Railway			
Manchester and Nashua Street Railway			
Manchester Street Railway			
Nashua Street Railway			
Portsmouth Electric Railway			
Springfield Terminal Railway			

=== New Jersey ===
Name	Date (From)	Date (To)	Notes
Atlantic City and Shore Railroad			
Atlantic Coast Electric Railway			
Atlantic and Suburban Railway			
Bridgeton and Millville Traction Company			
Burlington County Transit Company			
Jersey Central Traction Company			
Millville Traction Company			
Monmouth County Electric Company			
Morris County Traction Company			
New Jersey Interurban Company			Earlier Northampton–Easton and Washington Traction Company
North Jersey Rapid Transit Company			
Public Service Corporation of New Jersey			Including Newark–Trenton Fast Line
Salem and Pennsgrove Traction Company			
Trenton and Mercer County Traction Company			
Trenton–Princeton Traction Company			

=== New York ===
Name	Date (From)	Date (To)	Notes
Albany and Hudson Railroad (later Albany Southern Railroad)			
Buffalo and Lake Erie Traction Company (later Buffalo and Erie Railway)			
Buffalo, Lockport and Rochester Railway (later Rochester, Lockport and Buffalo Railroad)			
Chautauqua Traction Company			
Cortland County Traction Company			
Elmira, Corning and Waverly Railway			
Elmira and Seneca Lake Traction Company			
Elmira Water, Light and Railroad Company			
Empire United Railways			Composed of Auburn and Syracuse Electric Railroad, Empire State Railroad, Rochester and Syracuse Railroad (earlier Rochester, Syracuse and Eastern Railroad), and Syracuse Northern Electric Railway
Erie Railroad (Rochester Division)	May 1907		
Fonda, Johnstown and Gloversville Railroad			
Geneva, Seneca Falls and Auburn Railroad			
Hudson Valley Railway			
International Railway			
Jamestown, Westfield and Northwestern Railroad			
Kaydeross Railroad			
Keesevile, Ausable Chasm and Lake Champlain Railroad			
Lewiston and Youngstown Frontier Railway			
Lima–Honeoye Electric Light and Railroad Company			
New Paltz, Highland and Poughkeepsie Traction Company			
New York, Auburn and Lansing Railroad (later Central New York Southern Railroad)			
New York and Stamford Railway			
New York State Railways			Composed of Oneida Railway, Rochester and Eastern Rapid Railway, Rochester and Sodus Bay Railway, and Utica and Mohawk Valley Railway
New York, Westchester and Boston Railway			
Niagara Gorge Railroad			
Olean, Bradford and Salamanca Railway			
Orange County Traction Company			
Paul Smith's Electric Light, Power and Railroad Company			
Penn Yan, Keuka Park and Branchport Railway			
Penn Yan and Lake Shore Railway			
Putnam and Westchester Traction Company			
Schenectady Railway			
Southern New York Railway (earlier Southern New York Power and Railway Company)			
Syracuse and Suburban Railroad			
Wallkill Transit Company			
Warren and Jamestown Street Railway			
Western New York and Pennsylvania Traction Company			

=== North Carolina ===
Name	Date (From)	Date (To)	Notes
Piedmont and Northern Railway			
Piedmont Railway and Electric Company			
Tidewater Power Company			

=== North Dakota ===
Name	Date (From)	Date (To)	Notes
Valley City Street and Interurban Railway			

=== Ohio ===
Name	Date (From)	Date (To)	Notes
Cambridge Power, Light and Traction Company			
Cincinnati and Columbus Traction Company			
Cincinnati, Georgetown and Portsmouth Railroad			Never reached Portsmouth
Cincinnati and Lake Erie Railroad			Earlier Cincinnati and Dayton Traction Company, Cincinnati, Hamilton and Dayton Railway, Indiana, Columbus and Eastern Traction Company, and Lima–Toledo Railroad
Cincinnati, Lawrenceburg and Aurora Electric Street Railroad			
Cincinnati, Milford and Blanchester Traction Company			Later Cincinnati Street Railway
Cleveland, Alliance and Mahoning Valley Railway			
Cleveland and Chagrin Falls Railway			
Cleveland and Eastern Traction Company			
Cleveland, Painesville and Ashtabula Railroad			
Cleveland, Painesville and Eastern Railroad			
Cleveland, Southwestern and Columbus Railway			Never reached Columbus
Columbus Railway, Light and Power Company			
Columbus, Delaware and Marion Railway			
Columbus, Magnetic Springs and Northern Railway			
Columbus, Marion and Bucyrus Railway			
Columbus, New Albany and Johnstown Traction Company			
Columbus, Newark and Zanesville Electric Railway			
Columbus, Urbana and Western Railway			
Dayton, Covington and Piqua Traction Company			
Dayton and Troy Electric Railway			
Dayton and Western Traction Company			
Dayton and Xenia Transit Company			Later Dayton, Springfield and Xenia Southern Railway
Eastern Ohio Traction Company			
Felicity and Bethel Railroad			
Fort Wayne, Van Wert and Lima Traction Company			Later Fort Wayne–Lima Railroad
Fostoria and Fremont Railway			
Gallipolis and Northern Traction Company			
Hocking – Sunday Creek Traction Company			
Interurban Railway and Terminal Company			
Lake Erie, Bowling Green and Napoleon Railway			Never reached Bowling Green or Napoleon
Lake Shore Electric Railway			
Lebanon and Franklin Traction Company			
Lorain Street Railroad			
Mahoning and Shenango Railway and Light Company			Later Pennsylvania–Ohio Electric Company
Mansfield Railway, Light and Power Company			
Maumee Valley Railways and Light Company			Later Maumee Valley Railway
Northern Ohio Traction and Light			
Norwalk and Shelby Railroad			
Ohio Electric Railway			
Ohio Public Service Company			
Ohio River Electric Railway and Power Company			
Ohio Service Company			
Ohio and Southern Traction Company			
Ohio Traction Company			
Ohio Valley Electric Railway			
Pennsylvania and Ohio Electric Railway			Never reached Pennsylvania
Portsmouth Public Service Company			
Portsmouth Street Railroad and Light Company			
Sandusky, Norwalk and Mansfield Electric Railway			
Scioto Valley Traction Company			
Southeastern Ohio Railway			
Springfield Terminal Railway and Power Company			
Springfield, Troy and Piqua Railway			
Springfield and Washington Railway			
Springfield and Xenia Railway			
Stark Electric Railroad			
Steubenville, East Liverpool and Beaver Valley Traction Company			
Tiffin, Fostoria and Eastern Electric Railway			
Toledo, Bowling Green and Southern Traction Company			
Toledo, Fostoria and Findlay Railway			
Toledo and Indiana Railway	1901	October 15, 1939	Never reached Indiana
Toledo, Ottawa Beach and Northern Railway			
Toledo, Port Clinton and Lakeside Railway			
Toledo and Western Railway			
Wellston and Jackson Belt Railway			
Western Ohio Railway			
Youngstown and Ohio River Railroad			
Youngstown and Southern Railway			Later Youngstown and Suburban Railway

=== Oklahoma ===
Name	Date (From)	Date (To)	Notes
Ardmore Railway			
Bartlesville Interurban Railway			
Chickasha Street Railway			
Muskogee Electric Traction Company			
Northeast Oklahoma Railroad			Earlier Oklahoma, Kansas and Missouri Inter-Urban Railway
Oklahoma Railway			Earlier El Reno Interurban Railway
Pittsburg County Railway			
Sand Springs Railway			Earlier Sand Springs Interurban Railway
Sapulpa and Interurban Railway			Later Oklahoma Union Railway, Sapulpa Union Railway, and Tulsa–Sapulpa Union Railway
Shawnee–Tecumseh Traction Company			
Union Traction Company			Later Union Electric Railway

=== Oregon ===
Name	Date (From)	Date (To)	Notes
Oregon Electric Railway	January 1908		
Portland Traction Company			Earlier Portland Railway, Light and Power Company and Portland Electric Power Company
Southern Oregon Traction Company			
Southern Pacific Company	January 17, 1914	October 5, 1929	Southern Pacific Electric Lines, earlier Portland, Eugene and Eastern Railway
United Railways			
Willamette Valley Southern Railway			

=== Pennsylvania ===
Name	Date (From)	Date (To)	Notes
Allegheny Valley Street Railway	1906	1937	
Allen Street Railway			
Allentown and Reading Traction Company			
Altoona and Logan Valley Electric Railway	1902	April 1, 1938	
Bangor and Portland Traction Company			
Beaver Valley Traction Company			
Bethlehem Transit Company			
Blue Ridge Traction Company			
Carlisle and Mount Holly Railway			
Centre and Clearfield Railway			
Chambersburg and Gettysburg Electric Railway			
Chambersburg, Greencastle and Waynesboro Street Railway			
Chambersburg and Shippensburg Railway			
Citizens Traction Company			
Cleveland and Erie Railway			
Conestoga Traction Company			
Corry and Columbus Traction Company			
Cumberland Railway			
Eastern Pennsylvania Railways			
Ephrata and Lebanon Traction Company			
Fairchance and Smithfield Traction Company			
Hanover and McSherrystown Street Railway			
Harrisburg Railways			
Hershey Transit Company			
Indiana County Street Railway			
Jefferson County Traction Company			
Jersey Shore and Antes Fort Railroad			
Johnstown and Somerset Railway			
Johnstown Traction Company			
Lackawanna and Wyoming Valley Railroad			
Lancaster and Southern Street Railway			
Lancaster and York Furnace Street Railway			
Lehigh Traction Company			
Lehigh Valley Transit Company			
Lewisburg, Milton and Watsontown Passenger Railway			
Lewistown and Reedsville Electric Railway			
Lykens Valley Railway			
Mauch Chunk and Lehighton Transit Company			
Montgomery Transit Company			
New Jersey and Pennsylvania Traction Company			
North Branch Transit Company			
Northampton Traction Company			Later Northampton Transit Company
Northern Cambria Railway			
Northwestern Pennsylvania Railway			Later Northwestern Electric Service Company of Pennsylvania
Pennsylvania Railroad			Dillsburg Branch of the Cumberland Valley Railroad
Pennsylvania and Maryland Street Railway			
Pennsylvania – New Jersey Railway			
Philadelphia and Easton Electric Railway			Later Philadelphia and Easton Transit Company
Philadelphia Suburban Transportation Company			Earlier Philadelphia and West Chester Traction Company Philadelphia and Western Railroad, and Philadelphia and Western Railway; remaining portions operated by SEPTA as Routes 100, 101, and 102
Phoenixville, Valley Forge and Strafford Electric Railway			
Pittsburgh and Butler Street Railway			
Pittsburgh Railways			
Pittsburgh, Harmony, Butler and New Castle Railway	July 2, 1908	August 15, 1931	
Pittsburgh, Mars and Butler Railway			
Pottstown and Reading Street Railway			
Reading Transit Company			Later Reading Transit and Light Company
Schuylkill Railway			
Scranton Railway			
Scranton and Binghamton Traction Company			
Scranton, Montrose and Binghamton Railroad			
Shamokin and Edgewood Electric Railway			
Shamokin and Mount Carmel Transit Company			
Sharon and New Castle Street Railway			
Slate Belt Electric Street Railway			Later Slate Belt Transit Company
Southern Cambria Railway			
Southern Pennsylvania Traction Company			
Stroudsburg, Water Gap and Portland Railway			Later Stroudsburg Traction Company
Sunbury and Selinsgrove Railway			
Titusville Traction Company			
Trenton, Bristol and Philadelphia Street Railway			
United Traction Street Railway			
Valley Railways			
Warren and Jamestown Street Railway			
Warren Street Railway			
Waverly, Sayre and Athens Traction Company			
West Chester, Kennett and Wilmington Electric Railway			
West Chester Street Railway			
West Penn Railways			
Wilkes-Barre Railway			
Wilkes-Barre and Hazleton Railway	1903	September 17, 1933	
York Railways			

=== Puerto Rico ===
Name	Date (From)	Date (To)	Notes
Caguas Tramway Company			

=== Rhode Island ===
Name	Date (From)	Date (To)	Notes
Newport and Providence Railway			
Providence and Fall River Street Railway			
Rhode Island Company			Later United Electric Railways
Sea View Railroad			

=== South Carolina ===
Name	Date (From)	Date (To)	Notes
Augusta–Aiken Railway and Electric Corporation	1902	1929	
Charleston – Isle of Palms Traction Company			
Columbia Railway, Gas and Electric Company			
Piedmont and Northern Railway			

=== South Dakota ===
Name	Date (From)	Date (To)	Notes
Deadwood Central Railroad	1902	1924	Narrow gauge railroad that hosted interurban service

=== Tennessee ===
Name	Date (From)	Date (To)	Notes
Bristol Traction Company			
Chattanooga Traction Company			
Memphis and Lake View Railway			
Nashville–Franklin Railway			Earlier Nashville Interurban Railway
Nashville–Gallatin Interurban Railway			Later Union Traction Company (Tennessee)

=== Texas ===
Name	Date (From)	Date (To)	Notes
Brownsville Street & Interurban Railroad			
Bryan and College Interurban Railway			Later Bryan–College Traction Company
Eastern Texas Electric Company			Earlier Jefferson County Traction Company
Galveston–Houston Electric Railway			
Greenville Railway and Light Company			
Houston North Shore Railway			
Northern Texas Traction Company			Earlier Northern Texas Electric Company
Rio Grande Valley Traction Company			
Roby and Northern Railroad			
Southwestern Traction Company			Earlier Belton–Temple Traction Company
Tarrant County Traction Company			Earlier Fort Worth Southern Traction Company
Texas Electric Railway			Earlier Dallas Southern Traction Company, Denison and Sherman Railway, Southern Traction Company, and Texas Traction Company
Texas Interurban Railway			
Uvalde and Leona Valley Interurban Railway			
Wichita Falls Traction Company			

=== Utah ===
Name	Date (From)	Date (To)	Notes
Bamberger Electric Railroad			Later Bamberger Railroad
Emigration Canyon Railroad			
Ogden Rapid Transit Company			
Salt Lake and Utah Railroad			
Salt Lake, Garfield and Western Railway			
Utah–Idaho Central Railroad			
Utah Light and Traction Company			Long suburban lines

=== Vermont ===
Name	Date (From)	Date (To)	Notes
Barre and Montpelier Traction and Power Company			
Bellows Falls and Saxton River Electric Railroad			
Burlington Traction Company			
Mount Mansfield Electric Railroad			
Rutland Railway, Light and Power Company			
St. Albans and Swanton Traction Company			
Springfield Terminal Railway			Earlier Springfield Electric Railway
Twin State Gas and Electric Company			

=== Virginia ===
Name	Date (From)	Date (To)	Notes
Bristol Traction Company			
Newport News and Hampton Railway, Gas and Electric Company			
Norfolk Southern Railroad			
Richmond and Chesapeake Bay Railway			Later Richmond–Ashland Railway
Richmond–Fairfield Railway			
Roanoke Railway and Electric Company			
Virginia Electric and Power Company			Earlier Virginia Railway and Power Company
Washington and Old Dominion Railway (earlier Great Falls and Old Dominion Railroad)			
Washington–Virginia Railway			Later Arlington and Fairfax Electric Railway and Washington, Alexandria and Mt. Vernon Electric Railway

=== Washington ===
Name	Date (From)	Date (To)	Notes
Aberdeen and Hoquiam Railway			
Fidalgo City and Anacortes Railway			
Grays Harbor Railway and Light Company			
Lewiston–Clarkston Transit Company			
North Coast Power Company			
Olympia Light and Power Company			
Pacific Northwest Traction Company			
Pacific Traction Company			
Puget Sound Electric Railway	September 25, 1902	December 30, 1928	
Puget Sound International Railway and Power Company			
Seattle-Everett Traction Company			
Seattle Municipal Street Railway			
Seattle, Renton and Southern Railway			Later Seattle and Rainier Valley Railway
Spokane, Coeur d'Alene and Palouse Railway			Earlier Inland Empire Railroad and Spokane and Eastern Railway and Power Company
Tacoma Railway and Power Company			
Tacoma and Steilacoom Railway			
Twin City Railroad			
Vancouver Traction Company			
Walla Walla Valley Railway			
Washington Water Power Company			
Willapa Electric Company			Earlier Willapa Harbor Railway
Yakima Valley Transportation Company			

=== West Virginia ===
Name	Date (From)	Date (To)	Notes
Charleston Interurban Railroad			
City and Elm Grove Railroad			
Lewisburg and Ronceverte Railway			
Monongahela West Penn Public Service Company			Earlier Kanawha Traction and Electric Company and Monongahela Power and Railway Company
Morgantown and Dunkard Valley Railroad			
Ohio Valley Electric Railway			
Parkersburg and Ohio Valley Electric Railway			
Tri-City Traction Company			Earlier Princeton Power Company
Sistersville and New Martinsville Traction Company			
Tyler Traction Company			
Union Traction Company (West Virginia)			
Wellsburg, Bethany and Washington Railway			
Wheeling Public Service Company			
Wheeling Traction Company			

=== Wisconsin ===
Name	Date (From)	Date (To)	Notes
Chicago, Harvard and Geneva Lake Railway	1899	1930	
Eastern Wisconsin Electric Company			Connected with Milwaukee Electric Lines at Sheboygan
Manitowoc and Northern Traction Company			
Northern States Power Company			
The Milwaukee Electric Railway and Light Company			Earlier Milwaukee Northern Railway; later Milwaukee Rapid Transit and Speedrail Company and East Troy Electric Railroad
Wisconsin–Minnesota Electric Light and Power Company			
Wisconsin Power and Light Company			Earlier Sheboygan Light, Power and Railway Company
Wisconsin Power Company			
Wisconsin Public Service Company			
Wisconsin Traction, Light, Heat and Power Company			
Wisconsin Valley Electric Railway			

=== Wyoming ===
Name	Date (From)	Date (To)	Notes
Sheridan Railway and Light Company			

== See also ==
- List of town tramway systems in North America (covers countries other than U.S. and Canada)
- List of street railways in Canada
- List of town tramway systems in the United States
