= List of defunct railroads of North America =

The defunct railroads of North America regrouped several railroads in Canada, Mexico, and the United States. The following is a list of the past railroad companies.

== Defunct railroad companies ==
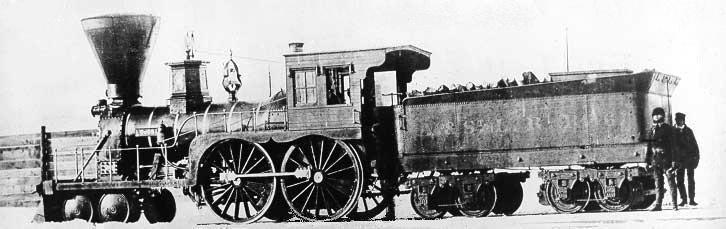
ASLR locomotive

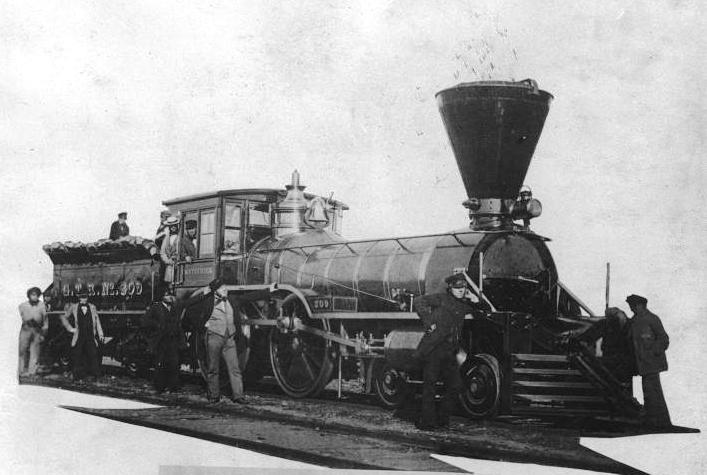
Grand Trunk locomotive in 1859

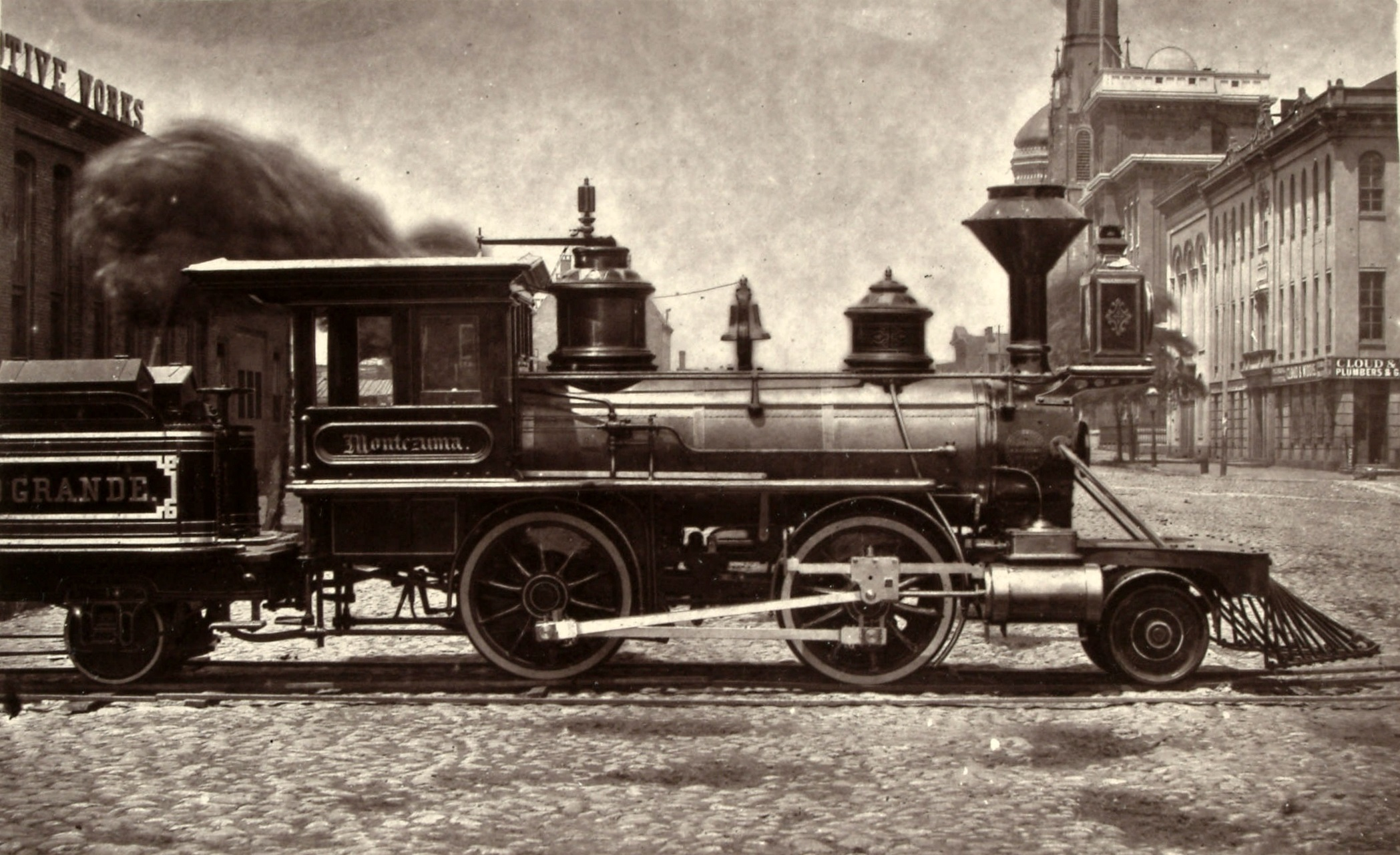
Montezuma, 1871, The first locomotive built for the Denver & Rio Grande.

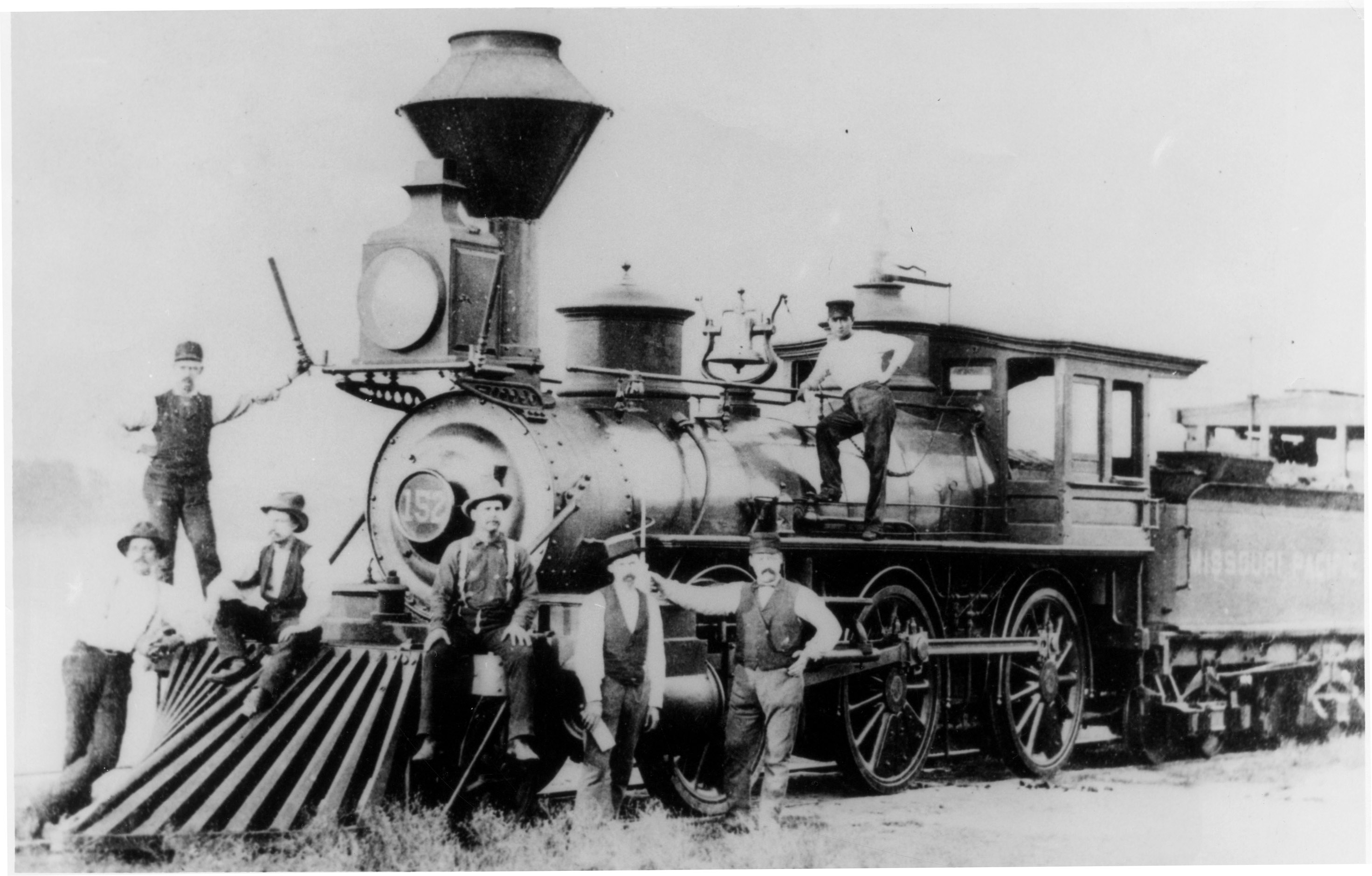
Missouri Pacific Locomotive #152

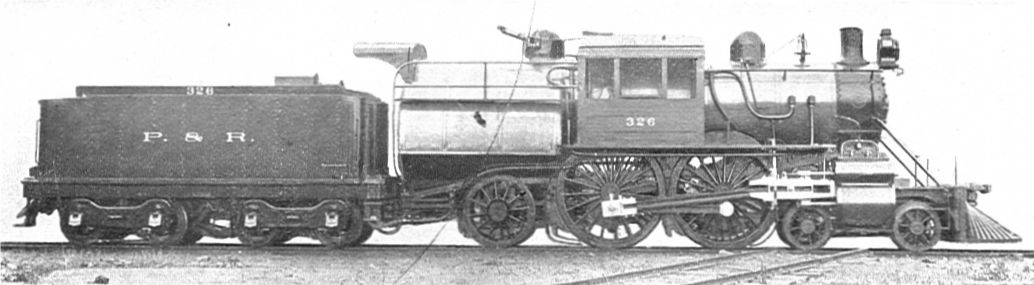
Vauclain compound locomotive, Philadelphia and Reading Railroad

- Algoma Central Railway (AC)
- Alton Railroad
- Atchison and Nebraska Railroad
- Atchison, Topeka and Santa Fe Railway (ATSF)
- Atlantic and Pacific Railroad
- Atlantic Coast Line Railroad (ACL)
- Auto-Train Corporation (AUT)
- Baltimore and Ohio Railroad (B&O)
- Bangor and Aroostook Railroad (BAR)
- Beaumont, Sour Lake and Western Railway
- Bevier and Southern Railroad
- Boonville, St. Louis and Southern Railway
- Boston and Albany Railroad (B&A)
- Boston and Maine Corporation (BM)
- Buffalo Bayou, Brazos & Colorado Railway
- Burlington, Cedar Rapids and Northern Railway (BCR&N)
- Burlington Northern Railroad (BN)
- Canadian Northern Railway (CNoR)
- Central of Georgia Railway
- Central Pacific Railroad (CPRR)
- Central Railroad of New Jersey (Jersey Central) (CNJ)
- Central Vermont (CV)
- Chesapeake and Ohio Railway (CO)
- Chessie System
- Chicago and Alton Railroad
- Chicago and Eastern Illinois Railway
- Chicago and North Western Transportation Company (CNW)
- Chicago, Burlington and Quincy Railroad (CBQ)
- Chicago, Milwaukee, St. Paul and Pacific Railroad (MILW)
- Chicago Great Western Railway (CGW)
- Chicago, Kansas and Nebraska Railway
- Chicago, Milwaukee, St. Paul & Pacific Railroad
- Chicago, Missouri and Western Railway
- Chicago Northwestern Railroad
- Chicago, Rock Island and Pacific Railroad (RI)
- Chicago, St. Paul and Kansas City Railway
- Chillicothe–Brunswick Rail Maintenance Authority
- Cincinnati, Jackson and Mackinaw Railroad
- Cincinnati Northern Railroad
- Cincinnati, Saginaw, and Mackinaw Railroad
- Cleveland, Cincinnati, Chicago and St. Louis Railway
- Colorado and Southern Railway (C&S)
- Conrail (CR)
- Cotton Belt Railroad
- Denver and Rio Grande Western Railroad (D&RGW)
- Detroit, Toledo and Milwaukee Railroad (DT&M)
- Detroit and Pontiac Railroad (D&P)
- Detroit, Grand Haven and Milwaukee Railway (DGH&M)
- Detroit, Toledo & Ironton Railroad (DTI)
- Elgin, Joliet and Eastern Railway
- Erie Railroad (Erie)
- Florida Overseas Railroad
- Galveston, Harrisburg and San Antonio Railroad
- Gateway Western Railway
- Grand Trunk (GT)
- Great Northern Railway (GN)
- Gulf, Colorado and Santa Fe Railway
- Gulf, Mobile and Ohio Railroad
- Fernley and Lassen Railway
- Fredericksburg and Northern Railway
- Hannibal and St. Joseph Railroad
- Hudson Bay Railway (HBR)
- Houston Belt & Terminal Railroad
- Houston, East & West Texas Railroad
- Houston & Texas Central Railway
- I&M Rail Link
- Illinois Central Gulf Railroad
- Illinois Central Railroad (IC)
- Illinois Southern Railway
- Illinois Terminal Railroad
- Inter-California Railway
- Intercolonial Railway of Canada (IRC)
- International–Great Northern Railroad
- Iowa, Chicago and Eastern Railroad
- Kansas City and Cameron Railroad
- Kansas City, Clay County and St. Joseph Railway
- Kansas City, Clinton and Springfield Railroad
- Kansas City, Kaw Valley and Western Railway
- Kansas City, Pittsburg and Gulf Railroad
- Kansas City Suburban Belt Railroad
- Kansas Pacific Railway
- LaPorte Houston Northern Railway
- Lehigh Valley Railroad (LV)
- Lackawanna Railroad (Lackawanna)
- Leavenworth, Pawnee and Western Railroad
- Louisville and Nashville Railroad (LN)
- Macon and Birmingham Railway (M&B)
- Maine Central (MEC)
- Maryland and Pennsylvania Railroad (MPA)
- Minneapolis and St. Louis Railway (MSTL)
- Mississippi River and Bonne Terre Railway
- Mississippi Valley and Western Railway
- Missouri and Kansas Interurban Railway
- Missouri and North Arkansas Railroad
- Missouri–Illinois Railroad
- Missouri–Kansas–Texas Railroad (MKT) (also known as the "KATY")
- Missouri Pacific Railroad (MP)
- Mobile and Ohio Railroad
- National Transcontinental Railway (NTR)
- New Orleans and Carrollton Railroad
- New Orleans, Jackson and Great Northern Railroad
- New Orleans & Nashville Railroad – see Uptown New Orleans.
- New York Central Railroad (NYC)
- New York, New Haven and Hartford Railroad (NH)
- New York, Ontario and Western Railroad (OW)
- New York, Chicago and St. Louis Railroad (NKP)
- New York, New Haven and Hartford Railroad
- Norfolk and Western Railway (NW)
- Northern Pacific Railway (NP)
- Northern Railway of Canada (NRC)
- Ohio and Mississippi Railway
- Osage Valley and Southern Kansas Railroad
- Penn Central Transportation Company (PC)
- Pennsylvania Railroad (PRR)
- Pittsburgh, Cincinnati, Chicago and St. Louis Railroad
- Pontchartrain Railroad
- Pontiac and Detroit Railroad
- Prince Edward Island Railway (PEIR)
- Raleigh and Gaston Railroad
- Reading Railroad (RDG)
- St. Joseph and Grand Island Railway
- St. Joseph and Savannah Interurban Railway
- St. Louis & San Francisco Railway
- St. Louis, Brownsville & Mexico Railway
- St. Louis and Hannibal Railroad
- St. Louis, Iron Mountain and Southern Railway
- St. Louis Southwestern Railway
- San Antonio & Aransas Pass Railway
- Seaboard Air Line Railroad (SAL)
- Seaboard System Railroad
- Southern Pacific Railroad
- Southern Pacific Transportation Company (SP)
- Southern Railway
- Spokane, Portland and Seattle Railway (SPSR)
- Tebo and Neosho Railroad
- Texas and New Orleans Railroad (TNO)
- Toledo, Ann Arbor, and North Michigan Railway Company (T, AA & NM)
- Toledo, Saginaw, and Mackinaw Railroad
- Toledo, St. Louis and Western Railroad
- Trinity & Brazos Valley Railway
- Tuckerton Railroad (TRR)
- Tuskegee Railroad
- Wabash Railroad
- Warren and Ouachita Valley Railway (W&OV)
- Western Maryland Railway (WM)
- Western Pacific Railroad (WP)
- Wilmington and Weldon Railroad
- Wisconsin Central Ltd. (WC)

== See also ==
- List of defunct Canadian railways
- List of reporting marks
- List of U.S. Class I railroads
- Transportation in the United States
- Narrow gauge railroads in the United States
- List of common carrier freight railroads in the United States
- List of defunct North Carolina railroads
- List of defunct Louisiana railroads
- History of rail transport in Canada
