= Lake Shore Electric Railway =

Lake Shore Electric Railway logo prior to 1920

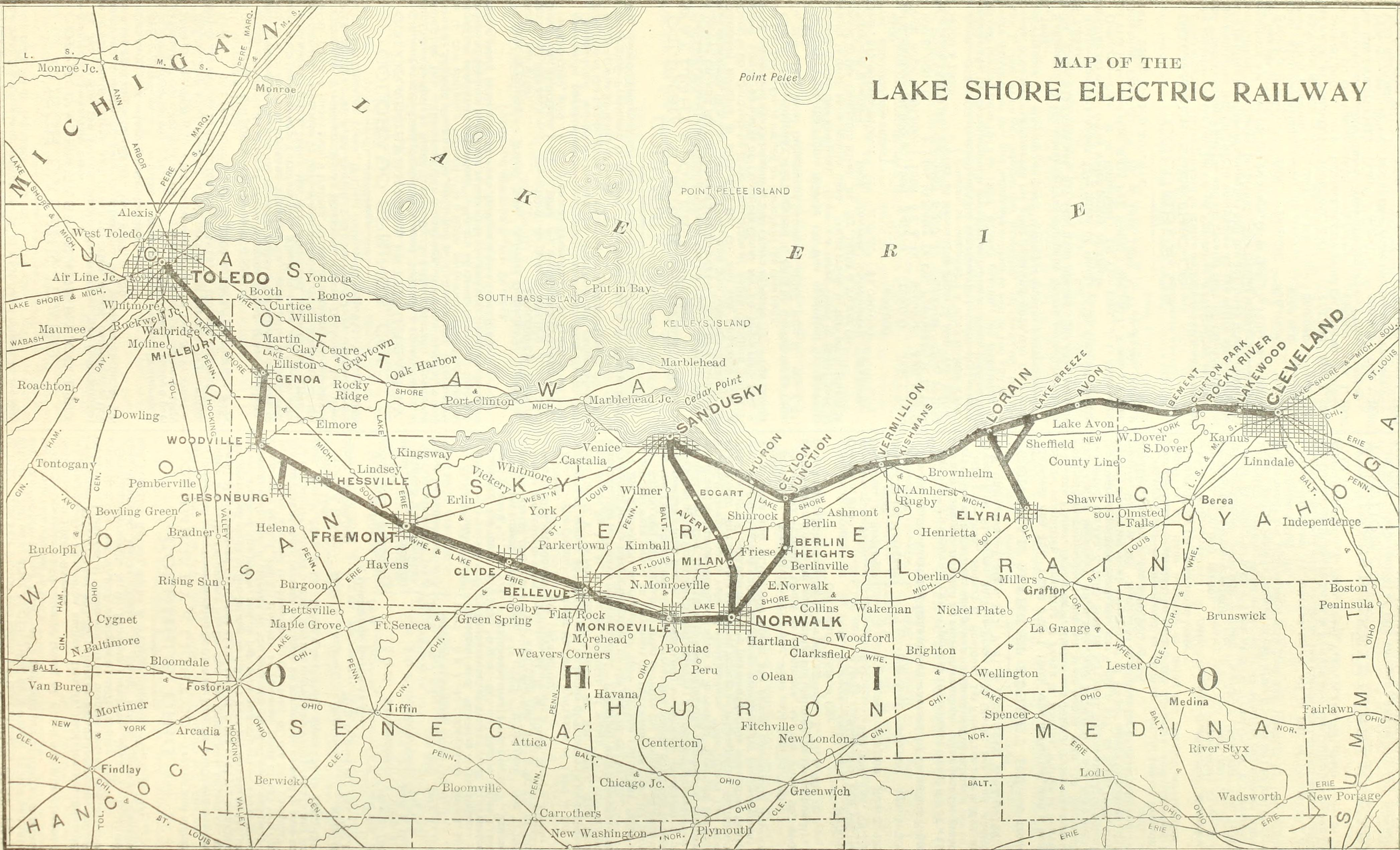
1906 Map

The Lake Shore Electric Railway (LSE) was an interurban electric railway that ran primarily between Cleveland and Toledo, Ohio by way of Sandusky and Fremont. Through arrangements with connecting interurban lines, it also offered service from Fremont to Fostoria and Lima, Ohio, and at Toledo to Detroit and Cincinnati.

== History ==
The LSE was formed in 1901 and was composed of four predecessor streetcar and interurban lines, all owned by the Everett-Moore Syndicate. The Lake Shore Electric operated a 60-mile route between Cleveland and Toledo. In 1907, the company constructed a cutoff between Sandusky and Fremont, Ohio, which reduced the distance between Cleveland and Toledo by five miles and decreased travel time by 30 minutes. The old and the new routes were operated with hourly passenger service where a two-car interurban from Cleveland separated at Sandusky and recoupled at Fremont to continue to Toledo. This service continued until 1939.

Business for the LSE was good until the mid-1920s, as many roads were unpaved, muddy, or dusty, and cartage and passenger transportation was horse drawn and slow. Around 1925, the states began paving highways, the counties began paving rural roads, the cities began paving streets, and inexpensive cars began to be produced in growing numbers. Business for interurbans began to drop as a result, and by 1930 many interurbans had stopped operating. The LSE barely remained in business, but to make matters worse, the economic collapse of the Great Depression was underway.

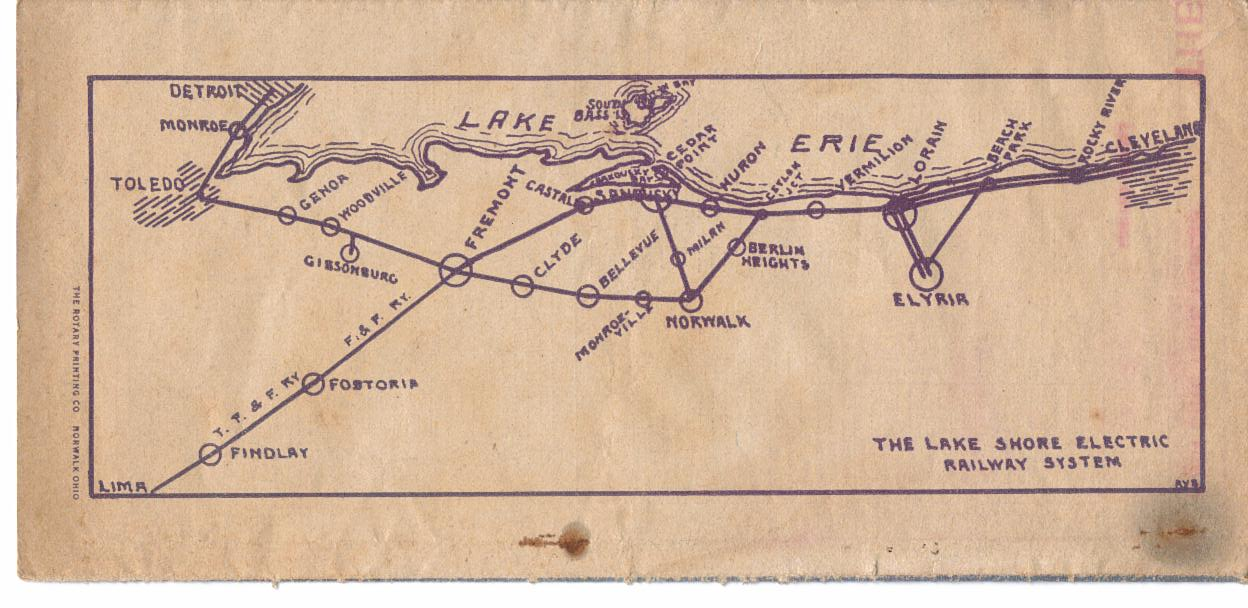
Map from an LSE timetable dated July 1, 1922

Starting around 1930, the LSE established a productive and growing freight business with neighboring interurban Cincinnati and Lake Erie RR. Together, the two traction lines with their connection at Toledo provided overnight delivery from the approximately 300 miles between Cincinnati and Cleveland. Steam railroads were unable to provide such fast service by a matter of days. At Toledo in 1936, 17,000 pounds of freight passed between the two lines. Although barely profitable, the resulting freight business generated income allowing the two lines to survive and keeping its employees working. However, the deepening Great Depression further reduced this freight business, and the LSE declared bankruptcy in 1933. Operations continued under the direction of a court-appointed bankruptcy receiver. In 1937, LSE freight-service employees went on strike, and the LSE receiver terminated freight operations that day. The next year, the railroad abandoned its remaining operations, which were passenger only. This also affected the Toledo connecting C&LE with the loss of freight business to Cleveland, and the C&LE was abandoned in 1939.

== Operations ==
The Lake Shore Electric at its height operated multiple-unit trains of interurban cars to and from Cleveland and Toledo on an hourly schedule. Eastbound trains split at Fremont on the west, while westbound trains split at Ceylon Junction (a passenger station on the former S&I line east of Huron at the connection with the former TF&N branch to Norwalk) on the east. After splitting, some cars would travel via the Huron, Sandusky and Castalia northern route, while others would go via the Norwalk, Monroeville, Bellevue, and Clyde southern route. The cars of eastbound trains rejoined each other at Ceylon Junction, while the cars of westbound trains rejoined at Fremont.

The Lake Shore Electric achieved nationwide note after motorman William Lang climbed out of his moving trolley car and snatched a 22-month-old child off the tracks on August 24, 1932, near Lorain, Ohio. The young girl, Leila Jean Smith, grew to adulthood and they remained friends for the rest of Lang's life.

Lake Shore Electric Railway Car #168 stopping at the interurban station in Vermilion, Ohio in 1936.

The LSE went into bankruptcy on October 5, 1932. It continued operation under court-ordered receivership until abandonment. As its passenger business waned with the increasing number of private automobiles on paved roads and the effects of the Depression, it outlasted most connecting interurban lines by concentrating on freight business. LSE had developed a marginally profitable freight service interchanging with the Cincinnati and Lake Erie Railroad at Toledo to deliver less-than-carload (LCL) freight from southern Ohio factories to Cleveland. The C&LE traction freights continued through Toledo to Cleveland on LSE trackage, operating on a tight overnight schedule; they could thus provide next day delivery, whereas competing steam railroads would take at least two days longer. LSE also introduced an early intermodal service called the "Railwagon" that enabled truck trailers to load on a specially designed flatcar without the need for a loading ramp or crane. Bureaucratic delays by Ohio motor carrier regulators doomed the service.

A poorly planned strike by LSE freight agents and office staff in 1938 caused the LSE receiver to immediately abandon the business. A brief article in a Cleveland newspaper noted that 150 interurban employees lost their jobs immediately. The loss of the Cleveland connection seriously hurt the C&LE leading it to bankruptcy in 1939 and the nearby Indiana Railroad interurban the next year. The LSE ended all interurban rail operations on May 15, 1938.

== Surviving remnants ==
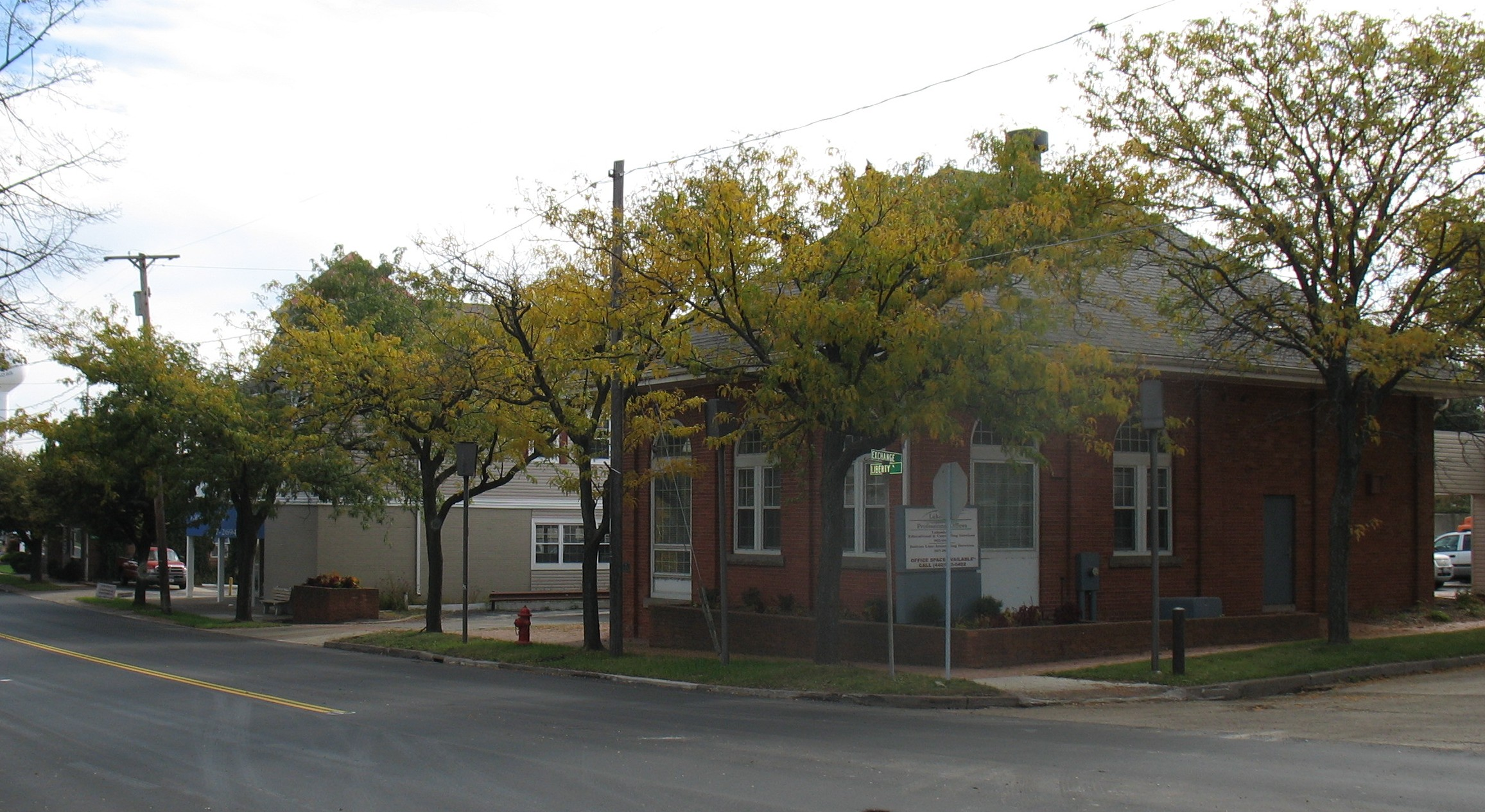
Lake Shore Electric Railway interurban station in Vermilion, Ohio, the same location of the 1936 photograph above, as it appeared in 2008, converted to professional offices.

Several physical remnants of the Lake Shore Electric can still be found today. In the cities of Bay Village and Avon Lake are streets named "Electric," running over the former right-of-way. Also, bridge piers can be found at the Cleveland Metroparks Huntington Reservation and in Cahoon Memorial Park, both in Bay Village, and at several other locations. Some former LSE structures remain standing, and have been converted to other uses. Much of its route can still be traced in northern Ohio by power lines on unusually high utility poles, where LSE's former electrical transmission infrastructure became the property of area utility companies.

== Existing equipment ==
As of 2009, LSE coach #167 (that made the last run in 1938) sits at the secure parking lot of Journey Home Restoration Company, in Lorain, Ohio. It is in surprisingly good shape. #167 is a 1915 Jewett Car Co. steel coach with Baldwin MCB trucks. In 1996 LSE167 appeared at the Centennial celebration for the Steel Plant in Lorain as the icon for the original Johnson Steel Company, producers of Jaybird streetcar rail. The Northern Ohio Railway Museum (NORM) in Chippewa Lake, Ohio has several pieces of LSE rolling stock preserved, including Lake Shore Electric wood Coach #149 (1927 Niles); wood Coach #151 (1906 Niles) and steel Coach #181 (1918 Jewett). Freight equipment includes wood Freight Motor #42 (1908 Niles) and wood Freight Trailer #464 (home-built by LSE in 1919). NORM also has an original Lorain Street Railway wood City Car #83, a line that was later operated by the Lake Shore Electric. In addition, wooden coach #150 (1906 Niles) and wood interurban box car #810 (1924 Kuhlman) are on trucks and undergoing restoration at Illinois Railway Museum as of February 15, 2010. LSE steel coach #174 (1918 Jewett) is preserved as a static exhibit at The Works in Newark, Ohio. Car #38 is parked in the Avon Lake Shopping Center, located on Lake Road, very near Electric Blvd.

== See also ==
- Northern Ohio Railway Museum
- Ohio Electric Railway
