= Aurora, Elgin and Fox River Electric Company =

Interurban in Illinois, United States

Aurora, Elgin & Fox River Electric
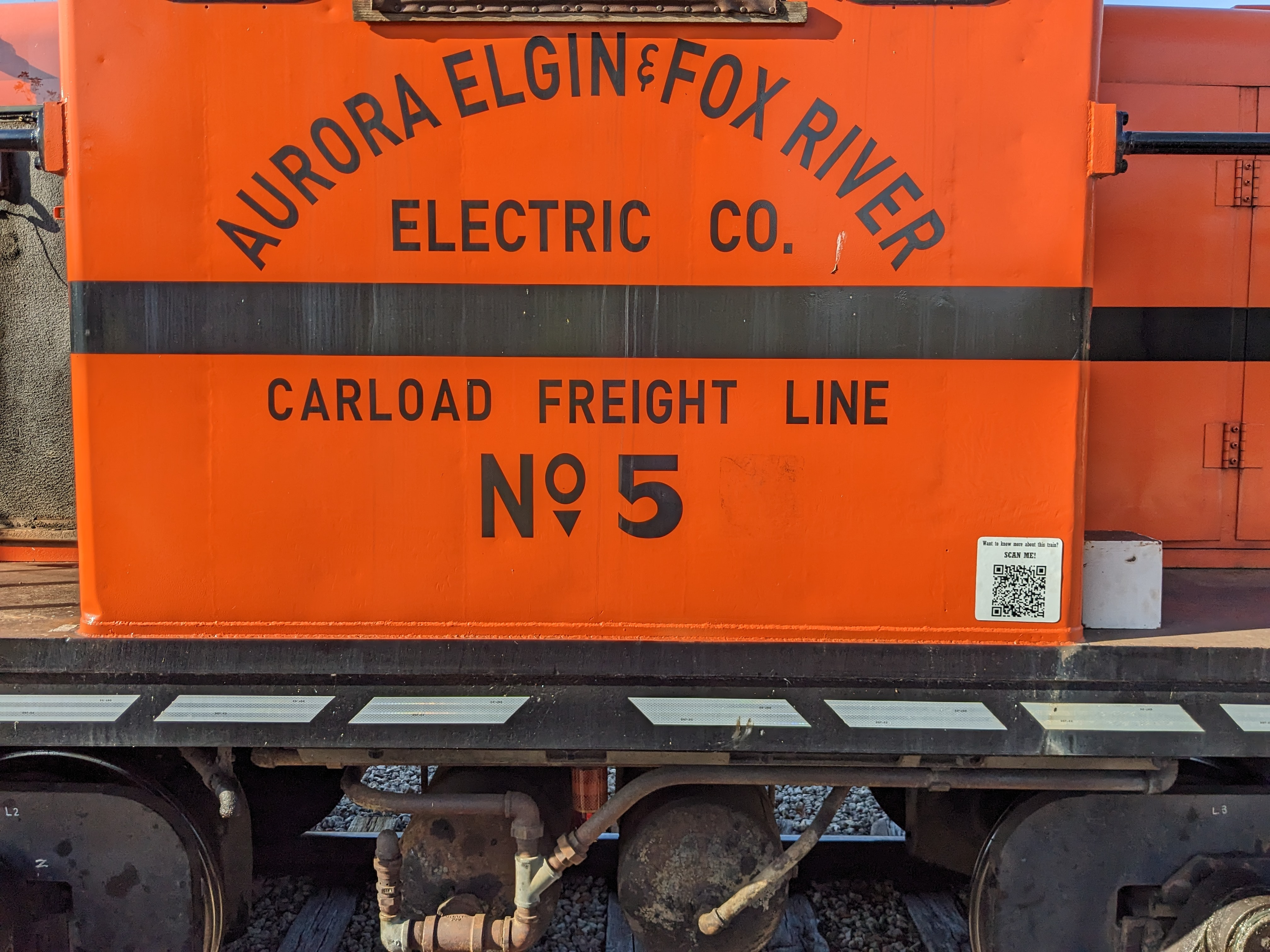

Overview
- Locale: Fox River Valley
- Transit type: Interurban streetcar
- Number of lines: 3 (interurban)

Operation
- Began operation: 1895
- Ended operation: 1972

Technical
- System length: 40 miles (64 km) (interurban)
- Track gauge: 4 ft 8 1/2 in (1,435 mm) standard gauge
- Electrification: Trolley wire 600 V DC
- Top speed: 45 miles per hour (72 km/h)

The Aurora, Elgin & Fox River Electric (AE&FRE), was an interurban railroad that operated freight and passenger service on its line paralleling the Fox River. It served the communities of Carpentersville, Dundee, Elgin, South Elgin, St. Charles, Geneva, Batavia, North Aurora, Aurora, Montgomery, and Yorkville in Illinois. It also operated local streetcar lines in both Aurora and Elgin.

== History ==
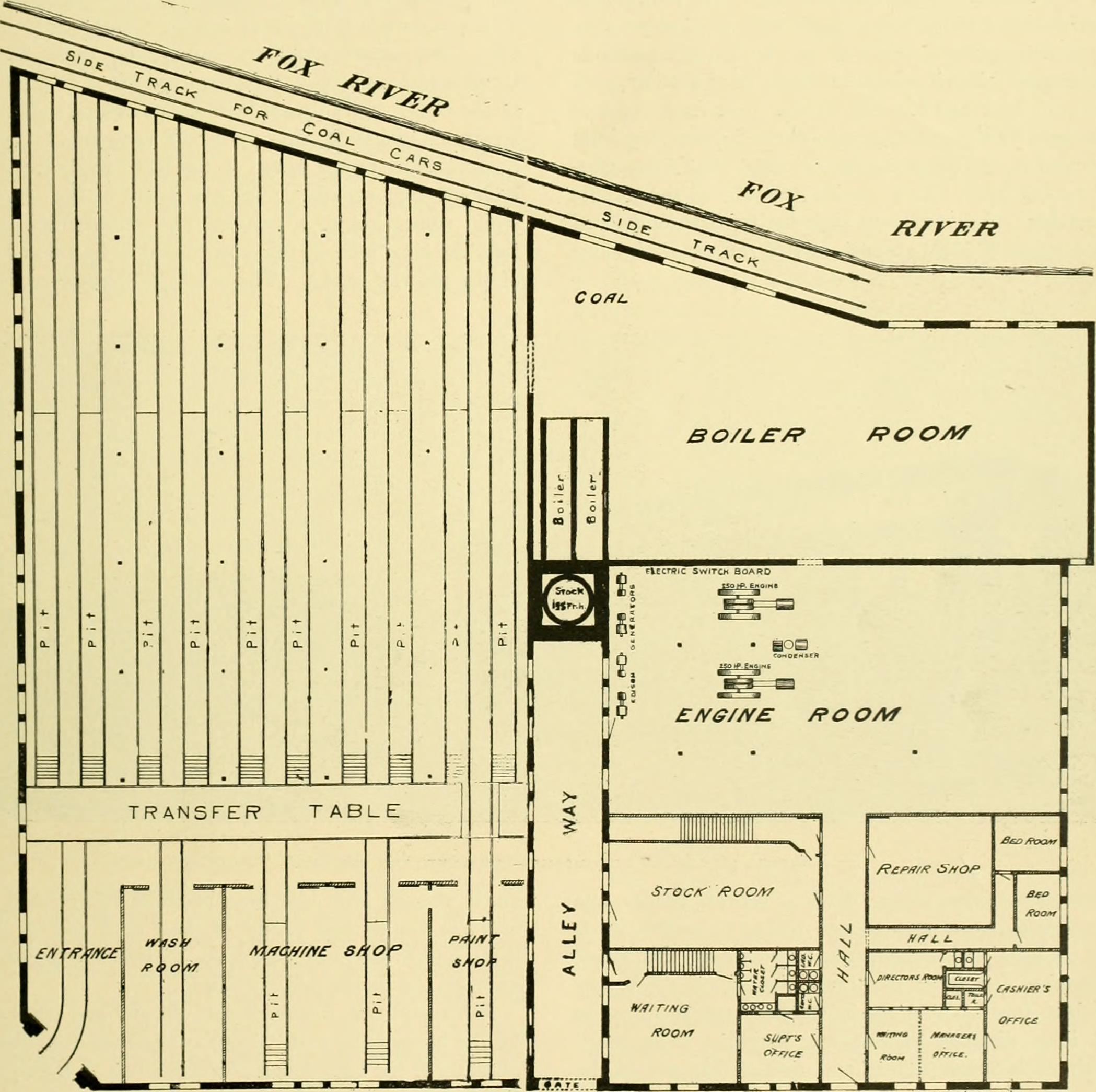
Ground floor plan of Aurora’s depot and coal power plant, as reported in 1891.

Predecessor companies opened service in 1895 between Carpentersville and Elgin; in 1896 between Elgin and St. Charles and Aurora and Geneva; in 1899 between Aurora and Yorkville; and in 1901 between St. Charles and Geneva. In the era 1901-1906 it was known as the Elgin, Aurora & Southern Traction Company.

The EA&S merged with the Aurora Elgin & Chicago Railway in 1906 and became the new Aurora Elgin & Chicago Railroad's Fox River Division. The company was separated by order of the U.S. Bankruptcy Court in 1923, when the Fox River Division assumed the AE&FRE name, and the rest of the AE&C (the Third Rail Division) became the Chicago Aurora and Elgin Railroad.

Service typically operated on one-hour headways between Elgin and Aurora, with connecting service between Carpentersville and Elgin, and between Aurora and Montgomery.

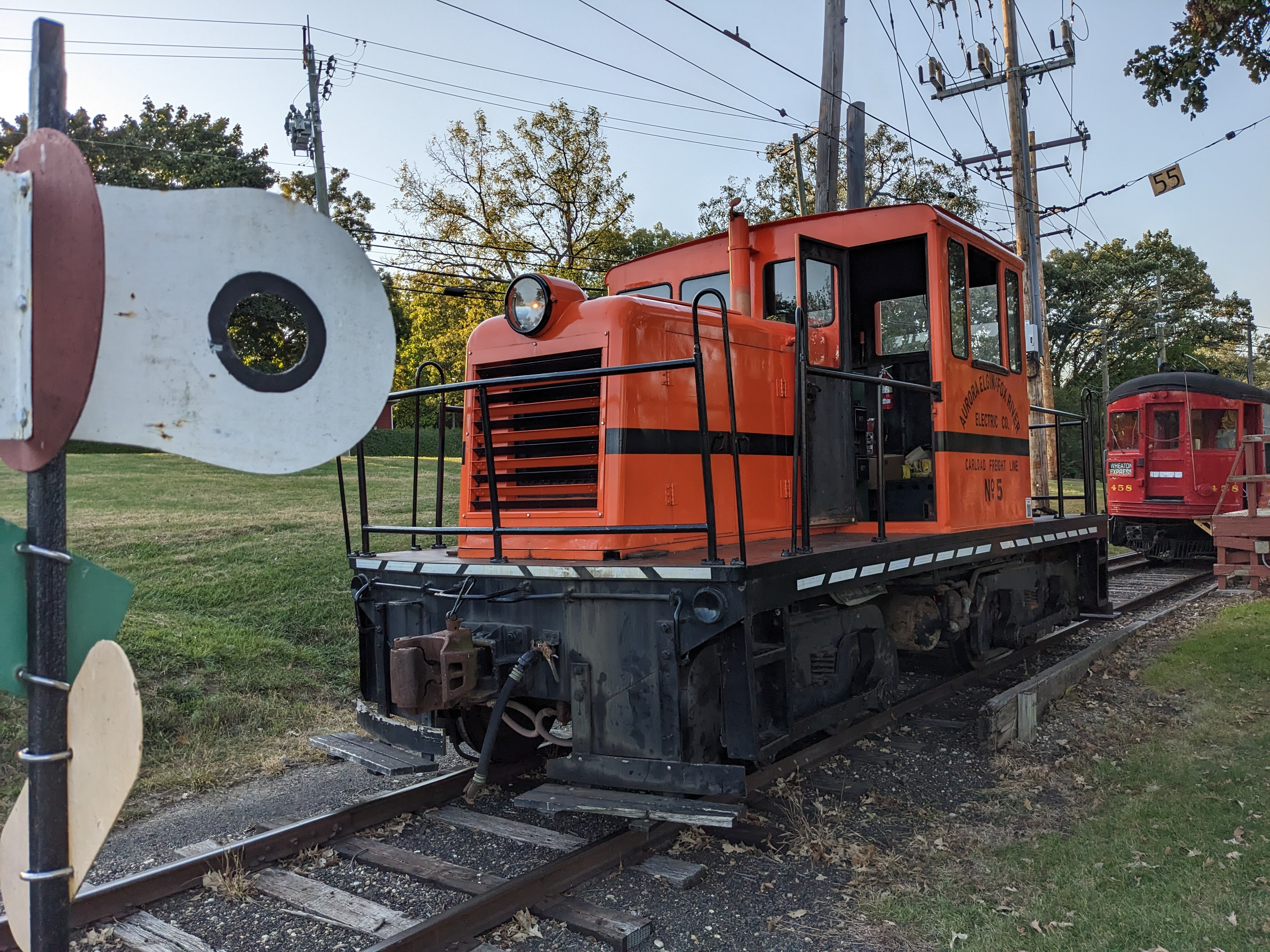
The diesel used on the line, the AE&FRE #5, at the Fox River Trolley Museum in 2024.

Passenger service ended March 31, 1935, except on a short stretch of track used by the CA&E in St. Charles and Geneva, where passenger service ended December 31, 1937. Freight service continued on a 3-mile (4.8 km) stretch of the line between Coleman Yard (at the junction with the Illinois Central Railroad Iowa Division) to supply coal to the powerhouse at Elgin State Hospital. This service operated under electric power until 1947, and by diesel until 1972. At that time, the remnant of the line was sold to its current museum operators. Rail remaining between the current museum site in South Elgin and the State Hospital was removed in 1978.

Today much of the railroad’s former right of way is now a bicycle path known as the Fox River Trail. The Fox River Trolley Museum in South Elgin operates over a preserved section of its right of way.

== Trackage ==
=== Elgin and Aurora streetcar systems ===
By 1900 both Elgin and Aurora had electric streetcars on lines radiating out from downtown. Elgin had 12 miles (19 km) of track, the downtown area was double tracked in the 1920s. Aurora had 18 miles (29 km), with double track in most of the downtown area by 1900. Aurora’s lines were often “through routes”, entering downtown on one line and exiting on another.

Since 31 March 1935, when rail passenger service was discontinued, routes in Aurora have changed, by 2013 under successor Pace little of the early city lines remained. In Elgin, by contrast, most streetcar lines are now part of longer bus routes. (Note: Examples in 2013 include the east side “Dundee” line, part of Pace Route 543, and west side “Highland” line, part of Pace route 549.)

=== Elgin-Aurora interurban line ===
The interurban line left Elgin going south on State Street (Route 31 (Note: By 1940 Illinois had designated Route 31 running north and south along the west side of the Fox River. For convenience this modern number is used here.)), past the State Hospital (a.k.a. Asylum)(mile 1.8), then down the side of LaFox Street through Clintonville/South Elgin (mile 3.1). Curving east onto private right of way the line went through the freight interchange at Coleman (mile 4.5) (Note: The section of track between the State Hospital and the Coleman interchange continued in use until 1972.), across the river on its own bridge, and continued south to an intersection with Fifth Avenue in St. Charles. Street running started there, south to Main Street, then west across the river to Third Street, and south again into Geneva on Anderson Boulevard. At State Street the line turned east and went to Third Street (Chicago Junction (Note: The section of track between Fifth Avenue and Chicago Junction was used by AE&C then CA&E shuttle cars until 1937, after the rest of the interurban service had been discontinued.), mile 11.6), where it turned south, then east, jogged south on Route 31, then onto private right of way between Route 31 and the river. A mile further south the line returned to Route 31, Batavia Avenue, street running through Batavia (mile 14.6), then on the east shoulder through North Aurora to the Aurora city limits. In Aurora the interurban used the Lake Street streetcar line on to the terminal.

As of 2025, Pace Route 801 provides bus service between Elgin and Geneva, although largely on a more western alignment. From Geneva to Aurora Pace Route 802 follows the original interurban line very closely.

== Rolling stock ==
By 1900 most Fox River area lines shared management, city car orders were often divided between Aurora and Elgin.
Lists include AE&FRE, predecessors EA&S and AE&C, as well as city systems in both Aurora and Elgin.

=== Cars used in interurban service ===
Interurban cars were double trucked with heavier construction than city cars.

Numbers	Builder	Year	Length	Seats	Notes
100/102/104/106	St. Louis	1901	45 ft 8 in (13.92 m)	48/48/44/44	
200, 202	Niles	1906	47 ft 6 in (14.48 m)	48	
204, 206	McGuire	1907	47 ft 10 in (14.58 m)	48	
208-214 (even only)	TCRT	1899	43 ft 2 in (13.16 m)	48	bought 1913, sold 1918 except 212 scrapped 1927
216-226 (even only)	Cincinnati		42 ft 5 in (12.93 m)	46	bought in 1918
300-306	St. Louis	1924	38 ft (11.58 m)	52	sold 1936

Car 304 has been preserved and operates at the Fox River Trolley Museum (its original line)

=== Cars used in both city and interurban service ===
Some double trucked cars were used in both city and interurban service.

Numbers	Builder	Year	Length	Seats	Notes
148, 150	Brill	1898	36 ft (10.97 m)	36	scrapped by 1922
152	St. Louis	1898	46 ft (14.02 m)	48	
156, 168	Brill	1909	36 ft (10.97 m)	36	bought second hand
170	Brill	1898	36 ft (10.97 m)	36	bought second hand
172	Brill	1898	36 ft (10.97 m)	36	bought second hand, semi-convertible
184, 186, 188	Pullman	1894-95	40 ft 10 in (12.45 m)	40	bought in 1909
190-196 (even only)	St. Louis	1908	43 ft 10 in (13.36 m)	44	bought second hand, scrapped by 1922

=== City Cars ===
Most city cars were single trucked “Birney” style, although a few double trucked cars were used.
On arrival cars 48, 50-97, bought by AE&FRE, replaced most older cars.

Numbers	Builder	Year	Length	Seats	Notes
48, 50-97	St. Louis	1923-26	28 ft (8.53 m)	32	
108-146 (even only)	St. Louis	1897	30 ft (9.14 m)	24	
154, 158-166 (even only)	St. Louis	1897	31 ft (9.45 m)	28	
182	Brill	1897	26 ft (7.92 m)	24	
234-248 (even only)	St. Louis	1913-16	41 ft 6 in (12.65 m) - 47 ft 10 in (14.58 m)	40	Double truck
250-258 (even only)	Niles	1910	32 ft 2 in (9.80 m)	24	
117-127 (odd only)	Briggs	1894	26 ft (7.92 m)	59	9-bench open
131-137 (odd only)	Stephenson	1897	32 ft (9.75 m)	50	10-bench open
111-115 (odd only)	Brill	1894	33 ft (10.06 m)	50	12-bench open double truck
141, 143, 147, 149	St. Louis	1894	33 ft 5 in (10.19 m)	72	13-bench open double truck

== Preservation ==
Number	Builder	Photo	Build Year	Location	Status	Notes
304	St. Louis Car Company		1924	Fox River Trolley Museum	Operational	Currently in Shaker Heights Scheme with AE&FRE patch, to be restored to original AE&FRE Colors soon
5	General Electric	Aurora Elgin and Fox River Electric #5 at the Fox River Trolley Museum in October 2024	1946	Fox River Trolley Museum	Operational	
7	Standard Steel Car Company		1927	South Shore Line Museum Project	Awaiting Restoration	Former interurban piggyback flat car from the Chicago North Shore and Milwaukee
306	St Louis Car Company		1924	Illinois Railway Museum	Undergoing Restoration	In true AE&FRE paint
303	St Louis Car Company		1924	Northern Ohio Railway Museum	Operational	Restored in Shaker Heights paint

== Connecting lines ==
In 1920 the AE&C Fox Valley Division connected with four radiating interurbans, all were closed by 1937.

=== Elgin & Belvidere ===
The Elgin and Belvidere Electric Company left Elgin from the end of the Edison Street line at Wing Street, going 36 mi (58 km) west through the small towns of Huntley and Marengo to Belvidere, and a 14-mile (23 km) run through connection to Rockford. With 9 passenger and 2 express cars they scheduled 19 trains each way with an hourly headway. Opened in 1907, it was the last to be closed to passenger service, in 1930.

=== Chicago, Aurora & DeKalb ===
The Chicago, Aurora and DeKalb Railroad connected to the Aurora city system at Plum and View Streets, and went 28 miles (45 km) west through Kaneville to DeKalb. 3 passenger and 2 express cars made 9 trains each way in a day on a 90-minute and 3-hour schedule. Opened in 1905 with light steam equipment, it was electrified by 1910, and closed in 1923.

=== Fox & Illinois Union ===
The Fox and Illinois Union Railway left Yorkville (where it also connected with the C.B.&Q) and ran 20 miles (32 km) straight south through Newark to Morris. Opened in 1914, two passenger cars ran 5 trains each way in a day. Grain was the major part of its freight traffic. Passenger service ended in 1924 but freight, converted to gas-electric in 1931, continued until 1937.

=== Aurora, Plainfield, & Joliet ===
The Aurora, Plainfield and Joliet Railroad left Aurora on the Parker Avenue line and ran 22 miles (35 km) southeast through Plainfield to Joliet. Eight passenger cars operated 17 trains each way in a day, and 3 streetcars provided local service in Joliet. First opened in 1903, it was converted to 5 Pierce-Arrow buses in 1924.
