= St. Joseph and Savannah Interurban Railway =

Electric railway in Missouri, US (1910–1939)

Coordinates: 39°56′01″N 94°49′23″W

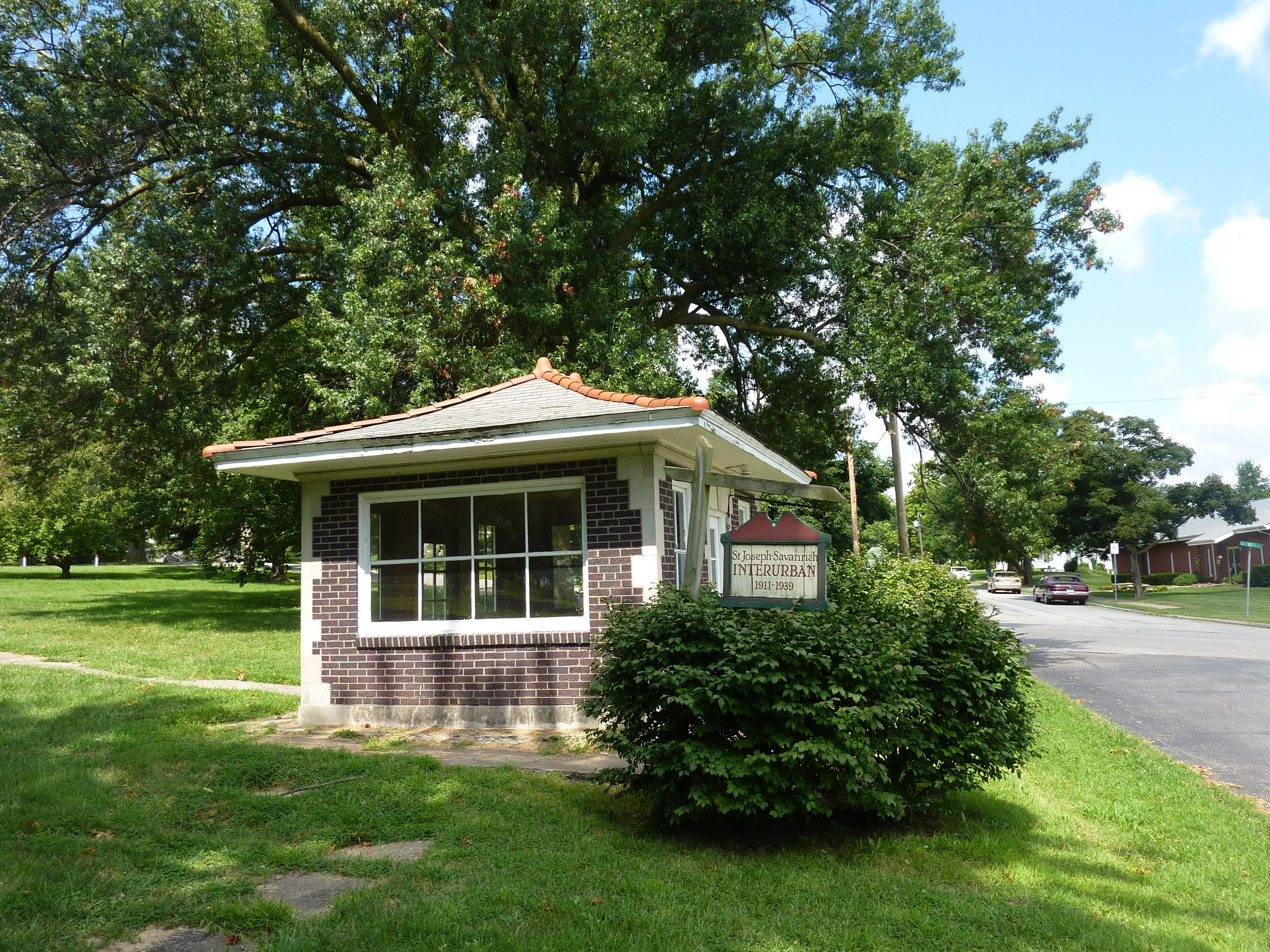
Station in Savannah

The St. Joseph and Savannah Interurban Railway was a 13-mile interurban electric railway that ran between St. Joseph, Missouri, and Savannah, Missouri, from 1910 to 1939.

Today, a tiny one-room waiting station still stands in a mostly residential neighborhood in Savannah.

== History ==
It was operated by the St. Joseph Railway, Light, Heat and Power Company, which operated the trolley system in St. Joseph. It began, on July 5, 1910, to compete with the Chicago Great Western Railroad. It consisted of three wooden cars and headed north on the streetcar line down St. Joseph Avenue and terminated four blocks west of the square in Savannah.

The line connected to the Kansas City, Clay County and St. Joseph Railway.

== See also ==
- List of interurbans
