= Cincinnati, Dayton and Toledo Traction =

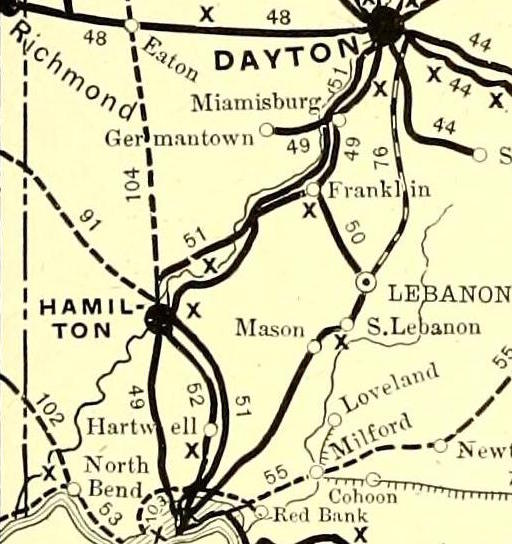
- The CDT in 1904. Lines owned by the CDT are indicated with the number 49. Cincinnati is at bottom center, unlabeled.

Overview
- Locale: Ohio
- Dates of operation: 1905 (120 years ago)– 1918 (107 years ago)
- Successor: Cincinnati and Dayton Traction

Technical
- Length: 67.22 miles (108.18 km)

The Cincinnati, Dayton and Toledo Traction was an interurban which operated in Ohio. It was formed in 1902 from the consolidation of several smaller companies. Its main line ran from Cincinnati, Ohio, to Dayton, Ohio, via Hamilton, Ohio, where it also owned the street railroads. It was itself leased in 1905 and dissolved in 1918, when its line was taken over by the new Cincinnati and Dayton Traction company.

== History ==
The company was created in 1902 from the consolidation of several other companies: Southern Ohio Traction, Miamisburg and Germantown Traction, and two street railroads. These companies were all controlled by the Pomeroy-Mandelbaum syndicate. The company owned the 61.62-mile (99.17 km) line from Cincinnati to Dayton (including the Germantown branch), plus 5.6 miles (9.0 km) of street railways in Hamilton. Financial difficulties led that syndicate to sell the company to a rival syndicate, controlled by Randal Morgan, W. Kesley Schoepf, and Hugh J. McGowan. They in turn formed the Cincinnati Northern Traction company, which leased the CDT in 1905.

The Cincinnati Northern was purchased by the Ohio Electric Railway on February 1, 1908, at which point the Ohio Electric assumed the lease. The Ohio Electric suffered financial problems throughout its existence and began selling off lines in the late 1910s. In 1918 it spun off the CDT's Cincinnati–Dayton route to a new company, Cincinnati and Dayton Traction.
