= Chicago, Aurora and DeKalb Railroad =

Chicago, Aurora & DeKalb Railroad

Overview
- Status: Defunct
- Locale: Fox River Valley
- Termini: Aurora, Illinois; DeKalb, Illinois

Service
- Type: Interurban

History
- Opened: 1906
- Closed: 1923

Technical
- Line length: 29 miles (47 km)
- Track gauge: 4 ft 8 1/2 in (1,435 mm) standard gauge
- Electrification: Trolley wire

The Chicago, Aurora and DeKalb Railroad was a 29-mile (47 km) interurban line which operated from 1906 to 1923 and connected the cities of Aurora and DeKalb, Illinois. The line made connections in Aurora with the Aurora, Elgin and Fox River Electric Company, the Chicago, Aurora and Elgin Railroad, and the Aurora, Plainfield and Joliet Railroad. Entry into Aurora was made via streetcar trackage of the Aurora, Elgin and Fox River Electric. Over the course of its history, the railroad used internal combustion, steam, and finally electric traction as motive power.

== History ==
The Chicago, Aurora and DeKalb Railroad was incorporated on December 8, 1901, as the Aurora, DeKalb and Rockford Electric Traction Company. The intention of the new company was to build an interurban line from Aurora to Rockford via DeKalb. The William C. Ross Construction Company of Chicago was hired to construct the 29-mile (47 km) line using 70-lb rail. Company engineers began preliminary construction on September 18, 1904, with grading to follow. Difficulties with the Ross Company delayed the work and the failure of the construction company to complete the work on time led some communities to begin removing the rail line's tracks and caused the Aurora, Dekalb and Rockford to sever connection with Ross and look into doing the construction work itself. Three miles of line poles to support overhead wire were erected and then removed after a decision to switch the line's motive power from electricity to gasoline-powered cars. A Sheffield inspection car was selected for use instead of an electrically powered interurban car.

Service began on June 9, 1906, with service between operating the Aurora city limits and Cortland. By this time the original plans to build from DeKalb to directly Rockford were abandoned in favor of operating a line from DeKalb to Belvidere and making connections to Rockford from there. To facilitate this, the backers of the Aurora, DeKalb and Rockford purchased the DeKalb – Sycamore and Interurban Traction Company intending to extend the line north to reach Belvidere. In addition to the gasoline-powered passenger cars, the Aurora, DeKalb and Rockford employed two steam locomotives for hauling gravel ballast and freight.

The Aurora, DeKalb & Rockford Electric Traction Company was reorganized as the Chicago, Aurora & DeKalb Railroad July 20, 1909. Electrification of the line was reinitiated and the work was completed on August 1, 1910. Aurora to DeKalb service began thirteen days later with the first car leaving DeKalb at 6:30 am.

On September 2, 1913, the line went into receivership. J. H. Bliss and W. S. Kirby were appointed as receivers.

The Chicago Aurora and DeKalb Railroad was purchased by Israel Joseph (a junk dealer from Aurora) on January 31, 1923, for $85,000. The following day, Joseph announced his decision to abandon the Chicago, Aurora and DeKalb as unprofitable. In response, a group of local farmers brought a petition before the Interstate Commerce Commission requesting a restraining order preventing the scrapping of the line. A similar request was brought before the Illinois Commerce Commission by the Kaneville Grain & Supply Company. The Illinois Commerce Commission requested a temporary injunction preventing the dismantling, citing that it had not been shown that the CA&DK couldn't be operated at a profit. The injunction was then issued by Judge Irwin of the Kane County court. However, Judge Palton refused to make the Illinois Commerce Commission's temporary restraining order permanent, which allowed Mr. Joseph to dismantle the line.
