= Kansas City and Olathe Electric Railway =

Interurban rail in Missouri and Kansas

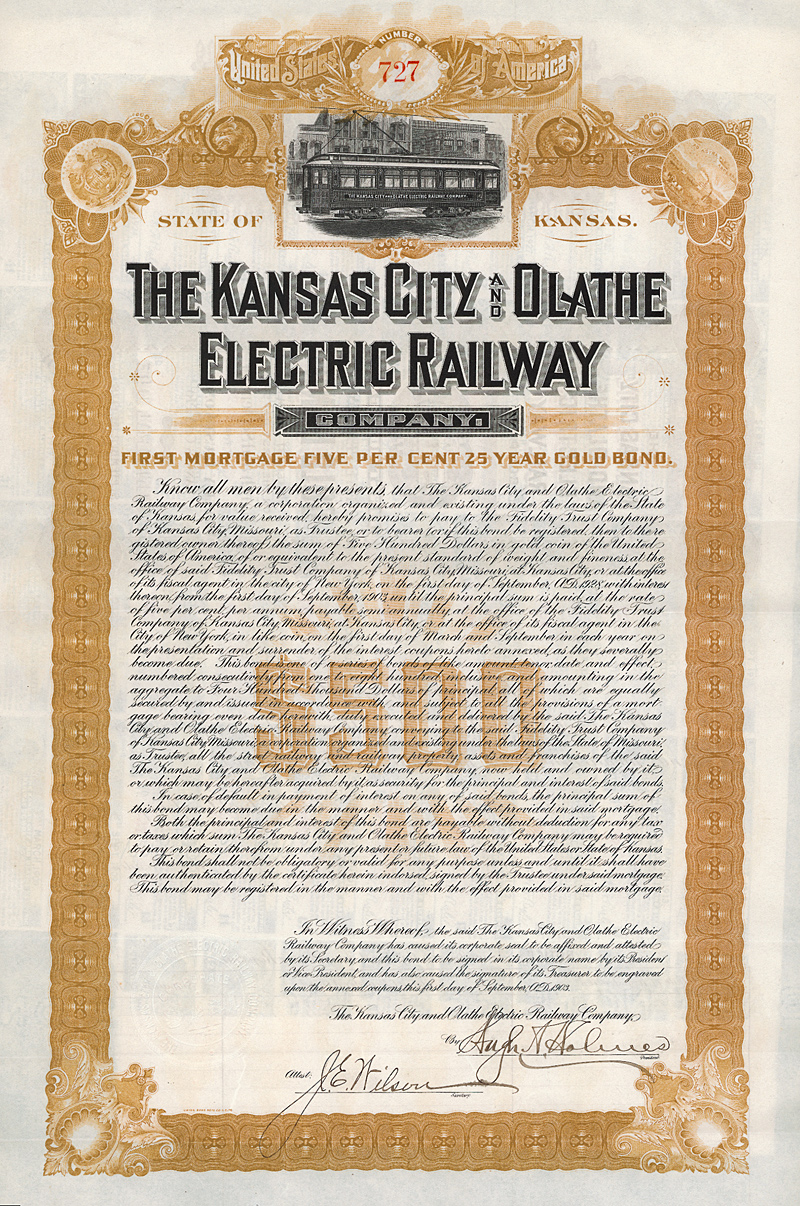
Bond of the Kansas City and Olathe Electric Railway from 1 September 1903

The Kansas City and Olathe Electric Railway was a 7.1-mile (11.4 km) electric interurban rail line between Kansas City, Missouri, and Olathe, Kansas. When it began operation in 1908, it ran from Rosedale, southwest through South Park to Merriam, then west to Shawnee. The road was abandoned in 1934.

It was also known as the Kansas City, Lawrence and Topeka Railway (because it originally was supposed to go to those cities), the Hocker's Grove Line for developer Richard W. Hocker (it now is usually referred to as the Hocker Line) and the Kansas City, Merriam and Shawnee Line (it was to stir development in Merriam and Shawnee, Kansas).

== See also ==
- List of interurbans
