= Kansas City, Kaw Valley and Western Railway =

Old American railway

The Kansas City, Kaw Valley and Western Railway (reporting mark KV&W) was incorporated on July 28, 1909 in the State of Kansas and operated as an interurban electric railway that ran between the American cities of Lawrence, Kansas, and Kansas City, Missouri, between 1914 and 1963. Passenger service was eliminated on the Lawrence segment prior to its demise in 1949. The line between Kansas City, Kansas and Bonner Springs, Kansas remained an electric freight operation until 1963. Major portions of Kansas Highway 32 are built on the original roadbed.

The line was opened December 12, 1914 between Kansas City and Bonner Springs, Kansas. In 1916 the line extended to Lawrence. The line had 75 passenger station stops, and trains left Kansas City hourly between 5:30 a.m. and 12:30 p.m.

In September 30, 1927 it was retired and succeeded by the Kansas City, Kaw Valley and Western Railroad Company.

== See also ==
- List of interurbans
