= Warren and Jamestown Street Railway =

Railway in the United States

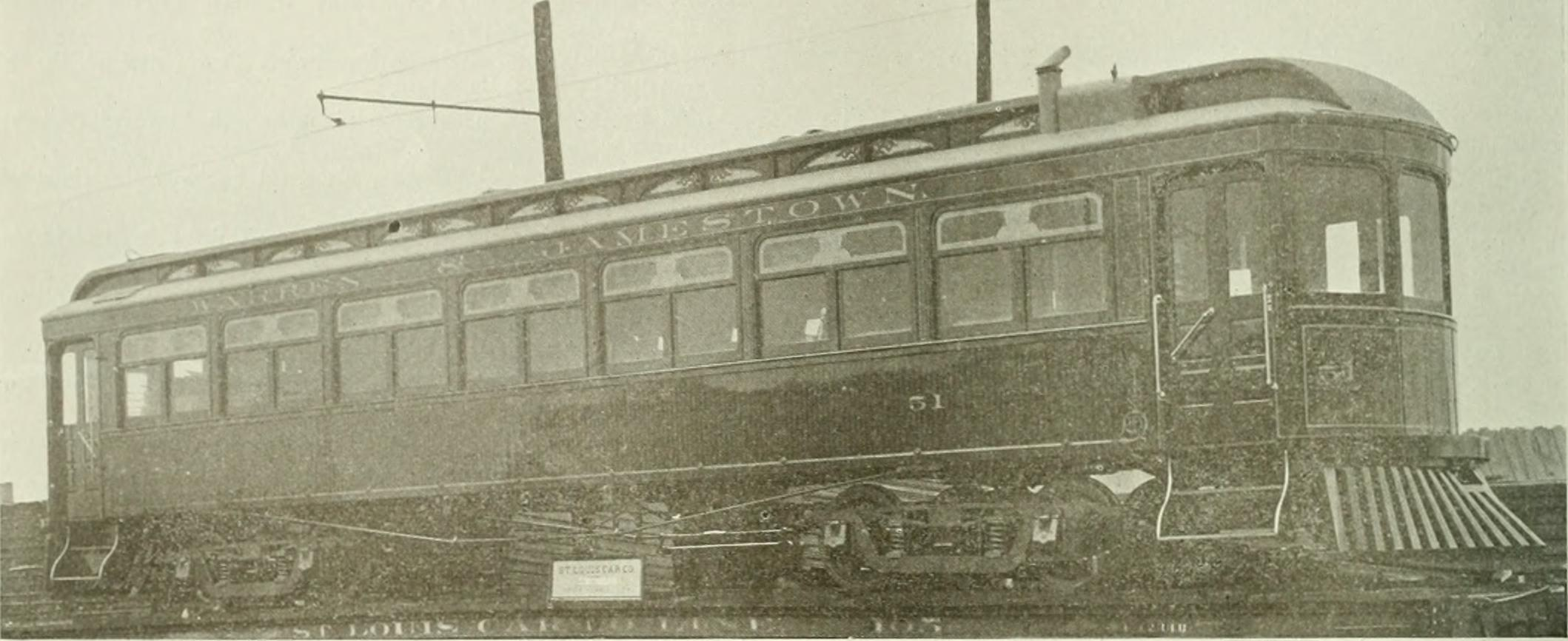
St. Louis Car for the Warren and Jamestown Street Railway, 1905

The Warren and Jamestown Street Railway operated a 22-mile (35 km) interurban railway line between Jamestown, NY, Warren, PA, and Sheffield, PA. The company was incorporated January 15, 1904 from the consolidation of the Warren and Jamestown Electric Railroad (chartered in 1902) and the Warren and Jamestown Street Railway of Pennsylvania. Operations began September 1, 1905. Operations ceased between Warren and Sheffield on April 1, 1928, and between Warren and Jamestown December 2, 1929.

== Route ==
In Warren, the line connected with the Warren Street Railway and extended south to Sheffield. The two companies were allied and shared repair shops in Warren. The line was very steep with a number of 5% grades, including one 1 mile (1.6 km) in length. Despite the grades, the line had an average operating speed of 50 miles per hour (80 km/h).

== Facilities ==
The powerhouse was in Stoneham PA, five miles (8.0 km) south of Warren, where horizontal gas engines using natural gas produced power cheaply. Initially power was a single phase 3,300 volt alternating current except for in the terminal cities where it was converted to 550 volts. This arrangement lasted until 1911 when the line was converted to the standard 600 volt direct current.

== Rolling stock ==
Initial rolling stock was a number of St. Louis built heavyweight wooden cars. In 1907 the company purchased Express car #50 and car #52. In 1916 a steel "stepless" car center-entrance interurban car was purchased from Kuhlman. This car was 48 feet 11 inches (14.91 m) long, 8 feet 6 inches (2.59 m) wide, 12 feet 2 inches (3.71 m) high, seated 47, had Brill 27MCB2x trucks with a 75-inch (1,900 mm) wheelbase and 33-inch (840 mm) wheels. The car had 4 50-horsepower (37 kW) motors, K35 control, and was capable of double-end operation. A later order from Kuhlman included two lightweight combination baggage passenger low floor cars of a conventional floor plan.
