= Minneapolis Municipal Waterworks Railway =

Electric railway

The Minneapolis Municipal Waterworks Railway, originally known as the Minneapolis Filtration Plant Railway was an electric railway operated by the city of Minneapolis, Minnesota to serve a water purification plant in Columbia Heights, Minnesota.

== History and Purpose ==
After building a new water filtration plant in Columbia Heights, the city of Minneapolis decided to build an electric railway connecting the plant to an interchange with the Soo Line Railroad ~1 ½ miles away in order to haul chemicals to the plant, replacing the trucks that had previously performed this task. The railway was built by a combination of day labor from the Waterworks Department and Minneapolis Street Railway Company employees, who performed the specialized work of laying track and hanging wire. The route was used mainly to haul chemicals such as coal, powdered alum, chlorine, ammonia, and sand . Originally, passenger service was limited to plant employees but it was later extended to the general public.

== Route ==
With a length of only one and a half miles, the Filtration Plant Railway was one of the shortest railroads in the country. The line traveled from an interchange with the Soo Line Railroad near the intersection of Central Avenue (Minnesota State Highway 65) and 36th Ave NE in Northeast Minneapolis. From there, the line traveled up Central Avenue to 37th street, where it turned right and ran on the north side of Reservoir Blvd to the filtration plant located at Reservoir Blvd and 45th Ave NE in Columbia Heights. The line climbed steep grades, ranging from 2-5%, and it gained 123.4 feet in elevation in only ~8000 feet of track.

== Equipment ==
The railway's equipment consisted of a single car, known as car 1. It was designed by a Minneapolis city engineer and built by the McGuire-Cummings Manufacturing Company in 1917. Due to the steep grades, car no. 1 could only take one loaded freight car up the hill at a time.

== Abandonment ==
May 1, 1948 marked the end of passenger service on the line. Freight service was discontinued on May 15, 1953 after the Minneapolis Street Railway decided to abandon its line on Central Avenue, and thus stop selling electricity to the filtration plant railway. Service to the filtration plant was continued through the use of trucks. Car no. 1 was sent to a scrap yard on August 20, 1953.
