= Fort Wayne, Van Wert and Lima Traction Company =

The Fort Wayne, Van Wert and Lima Traction Company, later known as the Fort Wayne–Lima Railroad, was an interurban railway which operated between Lima, Ohio and Fort Wayne, Indiana. It ran from 1905 to 1932.

== History ==
The company was organized in August 1902 in Lima, and consolidated with the nascent and formerly competing Lima, Delphos, Van Wert and Fort Wayne Traction Company in 1905 to complete the right of way between the two cities. Construction had begun by December 1904, and the line between Lima and Van Wert, Ohio, was put into service on January 1, 1905. Operations in Indiana between Fort Wayne and New Haven, Indiana, commenced on September 19, 1905. Through service was delayed by lack of ballasting between New Haven and Monroeville, but this was overcome on November 1 after a preview ride between Lima and Fort Worth by city officials and prominent businessmen from towns along the line the previous day.

Ohio Electric Railway would go on to lease and operate the line starting on September 1, 1907.

The company entered receivership in 1920 after going bankrupt, and the line was thereafter operated by the Indiana Service Corporation, later the Indiana Railroad, for the receivers. The system remained independent until service ceased on June 30, 1932.

== Rolling stock ==
As one of three interstate electrified routes between Indiana and Ohio, freight cars were made to be interoperable with mainline steam operations.

After abandonment, some cars went to the Oklahoma Railway.
