= Missouri and Kansas Interurban Railway =

Transport system in Kansas

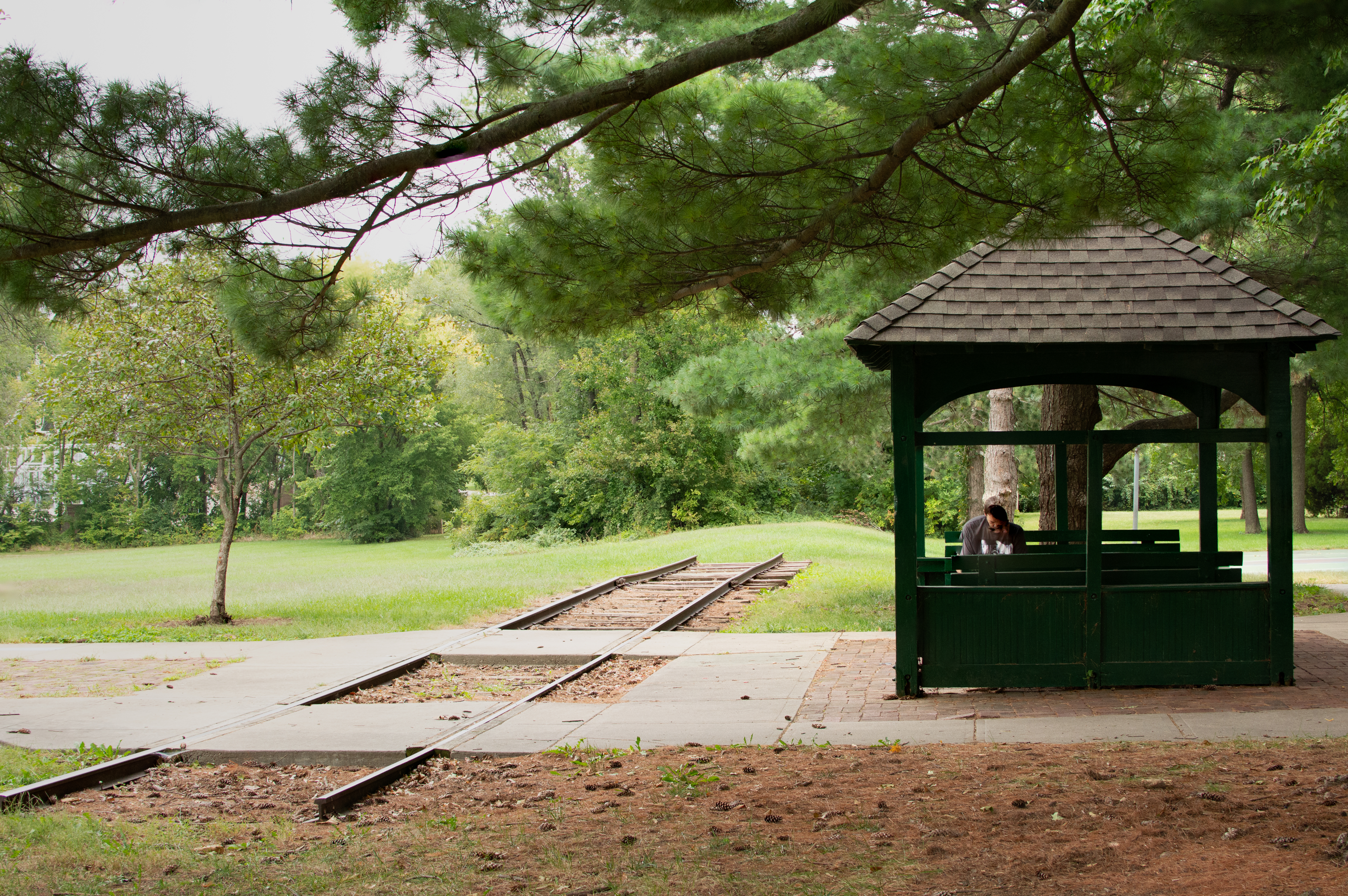
A surviving section of the Missouri and Kansas Interurban Railway's tracks in Strang Park, Overland Park, Kansas

The Missouri and Kansas Interurban Railway was an interurban line running from Kansas City, Missouri through downtown Overland Park to Olathe in Kansas. It ran from 1906 until July 9, 1940 and was the last of the interurban trolley lines in the Kansas City metropolitan area. It was called the "Strang Line" for Johnson County developer William B. Strang Jr.

== History ==
=== Conception ===
William Strang was an established land and railroad developer when he first envisioned the idea of an interurban streetcar line connecting downtown Kansas City to Johnson County as early as 1903, while visiting his mother in Kansas City. Strang bought 600 acres of rural land in 1905, founding and developing the suburb of Overland Park. Using the right-of-way of the old Santa Fe Trail, Strang built the Missouri and Kansas Interurban Railway as a means to attract new people to his community.

=== Operation ===
The railway opened in 1906, running between Kansas City and Overland Park. In 1908, the line was expanded southwest to serve Lenexa and Olathe. The line used combination diesel and electric trolley cars, which were housed and maintained in the Strang Carbarn. The expenses of the still-new diesel-electric technology compelled Strang to install overhead wires to power the cars, with power generated from the Carbarn.

The first decade of the railway's operation coincided with the peak of Interurban railways' popularity as a mode of transit. The Strang Line was one of numerous Streetcar and Interurban lines in the Kansas City area, serving thousands daily. Before the automobile became widely available, the public relied on Interurbans as a cheap and convenient way to travel long distance. Though not very profitable on its own, the price of Strang's speculative properties skyrocketed as a result of his railway, and the railway attracted prospective homebuyers to Overland Park where they could enjoy a suburban lifestyle as well as the economic benefits of Kansas City.

As early as 1916, the Strang Line began to struggle to compete with a rising preference for buses and cars as means of shipping and transit. William Strang died in 1921, and longtime right-hand man Thomas "Cap" Riley succeeded Strang as president of the railway. In the winter of 1925, the roof and interior of the Carbarn in Overland Park were destroyed in a fire and had to be rebuilt. The economic hardship of the Great Depression had an adverse affect on the Strang Line's ridership. In 1932, Riley announced a fare reduction to 65 cents. At the same time, all employees took a 25% pay cut, and all officers took 30% pay cut. The railway struggled through the 1930s, and by November 1937, the opening of 50 Highway and K-10 allowed cars to travel the length of the Strang Line in half the time.

Like other streetcars and interurbans of the time, the lack of modern construction, safety, and signaling standards meant that Strang Line vehicles often collided with other streetcars, automobiles, livestock, and people. Robberies and fires were also not uncommon. On May 17, 1939, a short circuit caused a Strang Line car to notably burst into flames in downtown Kansas City.

=== Closure ===
The Missouri and Kansas Interurban Railway declared bankruptcy in 1940. By its closure on July 9th, 1940, the Strang Line was the last remaining Interurban in Kansas City. The line's closure attracted significant public attention, as passengers went as far as to make off with the streetcar's seat cushions as souvenirs. The line's final intended round-trip departed downtown with 82 passengers in a 55-seat vehicle, and needed to be boarded by police within the first ten blocks telling the riotous passengers to calm down. Riders had damaged the car so much by the time the line arrived to its southwestern end in Olathe that Thomas Riley canceled the return trip to downtown.

Urban rail transit returned to Kansas City in 2016 with the opening of the KC Streetcar. Part of its route, on Main Street between 9th Street and Pershing Road, are shared with the old route of the Strang Line.

=== Historical Preservation ===
After the closure of the Strang Line, all of its rails and most of its infrastructure were abandoned and torn down. The Strang Carbarn in Overland Park still exists at 79th Street and Santa Fe Drive, currently the home of the Stone Manor Wedding Venue in Downtown Overland Park. The former Strang Line depot at 80th Street and Santa Fe Drive was purchased by the Overland Park Historical Society in 2019 and still stands today. A small waiting station, originally situated near the intersection of 53rd Street and Lamar Avenue, was moved to a Lenexa farm after the line's closure and was eventually donated to the Lenexa Historical Society. The station can be found at the Society's complex today.

== Route ==
The northern terminus of the Strang Line was at the intersection of 9th and Main Streets in Downtown Kansas City. The northern section of the line was street-running and traveled through urban areas of Kansas City. At 39th Street, the route turned west and crossed the state line, arriving in Rosedale, Kansas. South of Rosedale the line followed the Santa Fe Trail, serving Milburn Country Club, Downtown Overland Park, and an airfield also built by William Strang. Southwest of Overland Park the line served Lenexa before arriving at its southern terminus in Downtown Olathe.

== Impact on Overland Park ==
William Strang is regarded as the founder of Overland Park. Strang envisioned a park-like community along the Overland Trail, above the floodplain of the Kansas and Missouri Rivers. Strang created Overland Park as an early Suburban community, free from Kansas City's hustle, noise, crowded and rising population, and frequent flooding. Overland Park was made to cater to the middle class, with more modest homes as opposed to suburbs developed by Strang's contemporaries like J. C. Nichols for wealthier homeowners. The Strang Line allowed people the opportunity to work and shop in Kansas City while living in the quieter and more open Overland Park, while also shipping freight between cities. Strang also provided urban amenities like gas, electricity, and indoor plumbing to Overland Park. The Strang Carbarn became a major driver of employment in Overland Park's early years, and the Strang Line Depot became the heart of Overland Park's downtown. The Strang Line and Strang's other visionary ideas were a driving factor behind Overland Park's unprecedented growth. Today, Overland Park is the second-largest city in the state of Kansas.

== See also ==
- List of interurbans
- Streetcar suburb
