= Augusta–Aiken Railway and Electric Corporation =

Augusta-Aiken Railway & Electric Corporation
Overview
- Headquarters: Augusta, Georgia
- Reporting mark: AARY
- Locale: Central Savannah River Area
- Dates of operation: 1902–1929
- Successor: None (Abandoned)

Technical
- Track gauge: 4 ft 8 1/2 in (1,435 mm) standard gauge
- Length: 23.6 mi (38.0 km)

The Augusta–Aiken Railway and Electric Corporation was an electric interurban railroad that operated between Augusta, Georgia and Aiken, South Carolina. Once completed in 1902 the railroad remained in operation until it was abandoned in 1929.

== History ==
Augusta, Georgia hosted an electric street railway network after 1890 and an intricate horsecar network prior to that year. A short spur reaching out from Augusta, bridging the Savannah River, and into South Carolina had already been in place since 1891.

Around the turn of the century, James U. Jackson and other land developers began construction on the luxurious Hampton Terrace Hotel in North Augusta. Simultaneously the trolley was extended to the resort hotel and further surveyed for extension to Aiken, South Carolina. The railroad reached Aiken in 1902 and began operations that same year. The Hampton Terrace Hotel had its own spur track used to deliver coal and freight, and remained an important fixture of the route until it burned to the ground in 1916.

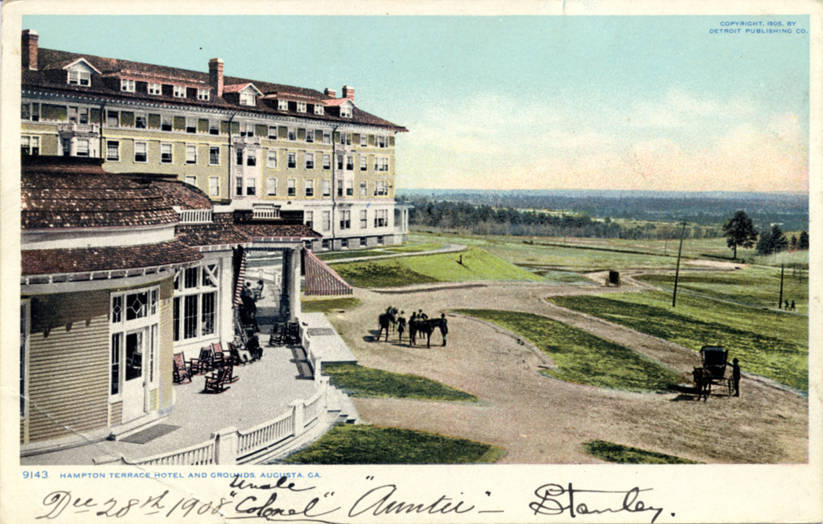
Hampton Terrace Hotel, in a 1906 postcard

Freight services over the line came in the form of an express car and electric boxcab locomotives. Most freight traffic consisted of coal delivered to the Hampton Terrace Hotel or to the numerous cotton mills along the line.

As with many other interurban railroads in the United States, the advent of the automobile helped bring about the end of the Augusta - Aiken trolley in 1929. Augusta's own streetcar network would be out of service by 1937, replaced by intercity buses.
