= Fidalgo City and Anacortes Railway =

The Fidalgo City and Anacortes Railway constructed and operated a 13-mile (21 km) long electric railway extending from Anacortes, Washington, to Fidalgo City (now Dewey, Washington) and Dewey Beach (all on Fidalgo Island) in the state of Washington, USA. The company was incorporated June 30, 1890 and operation began March 29, 1891. This is said to have been the first electric railway in Washington.

The company's prospectus indicates an intent to be capitalized at US$250,000. The organizers were Julius S. Potter, C.B. Holman, H.C. Colver, Joshua Pierce. W.A. Potter (? - December 1893) was a trustee. Offices were in Anacortes.

Local lore says that the trolley only ever made one round trip to Fidalgo City, and much of that trip was made behind a horse due to difficulties with or insufficient capacity of the power generator. The line is said to have operated sporadically within Anacortes for the remainder of its lifespan, again, owing to an unreliable power supply system.

Operations continued until the collapse of the land boom in the Panic of 1893, when the road was abandoned and the track was removed.
