= Northern Ohio Railway Museum =

Museum in Chippewa Lake, Ohio

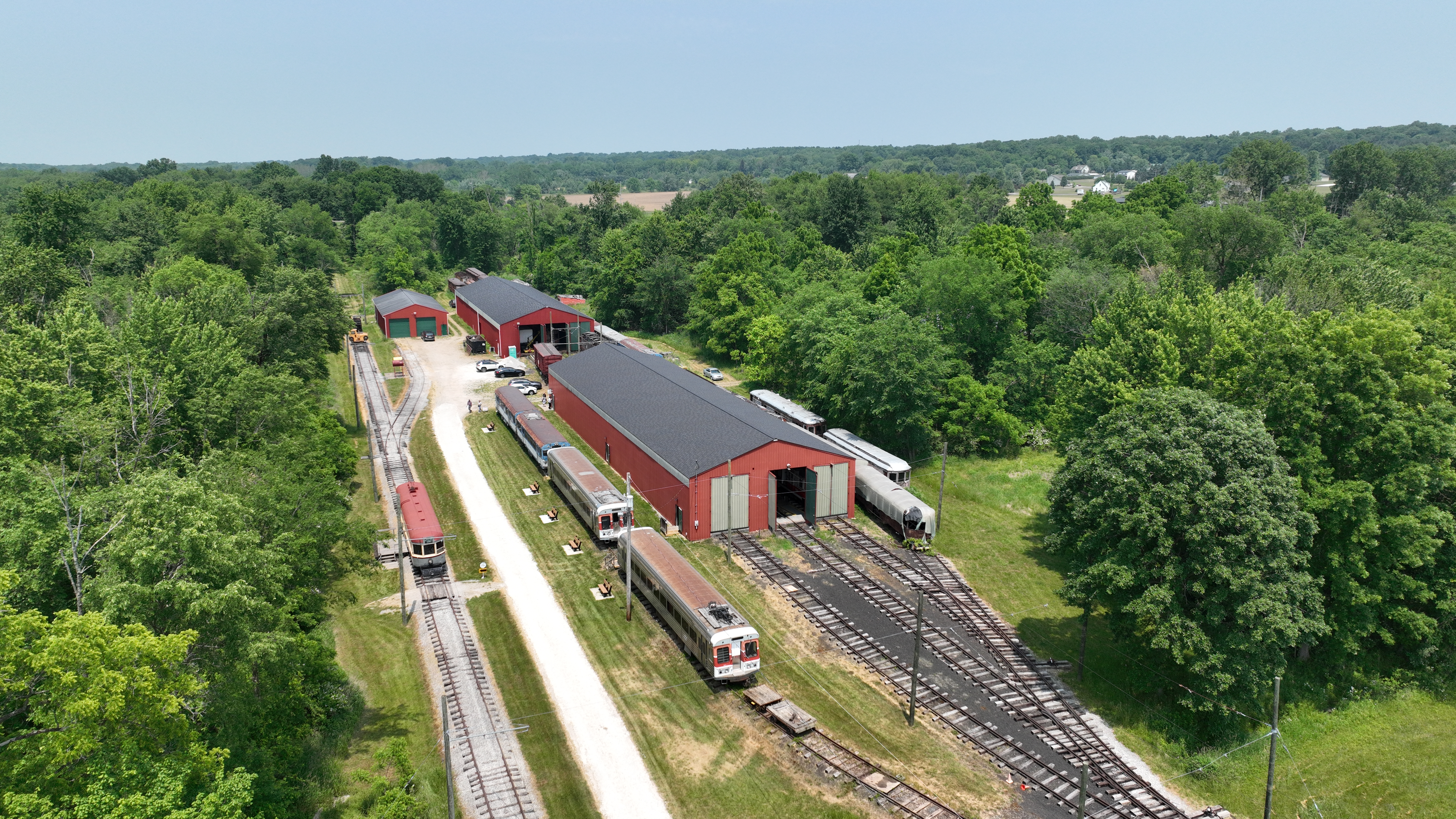
- The museum grounds in 2023
- Established: 1965
- Location: 5515 Buffham Road, Chippewa Lake, Ohio
- Coordinates: 41.0467°N 81.888°W
- Type: Railway museum
- Website: http://www.northernohiorailwaymuseum.org

The Northern Ohio Railway Museum is a railroad museum located near Chippewa Lake, Ohio, United States. The museum is a non-profit, educational organization. It was established in 1965, granted 501(c)(3) status by the Internal Revenue Service in 1966, and incorporated under the laws of the State of Ohio in 1976. Its membership is approximately 180 electric railway devotees who reside throughout the United States and Canada, with the majority in northeastern Ohio.

== Mission ==
The mission of the Northern Ohio Railway Museum is to collect, preserve and maintain for study and exhibition streetcars, artifacts, mementos and assorted railway equipment related to the origin, development and use of transit equipment and operations in northern Ohio. Its major focus is building an operating railway museum that allows the running of the current collection of railway equipment for the education and enjoyment of the public.

== Location and facilities ==
The museum is situated on 42 acres (17 ha) in the Chippewa Valley, near two interstate highways. It is 45 minutes from Cleveland, 30 minutes from Akron, and 90 minutes from Columbus. Properties consist of two miles of former Cleveland and Southwestern interurban right-of-way, and an adjacent 30-acre (12 ha) parcel for the carbarns, yards, and visitor facilities. This property is at 5515 Buffham Road in Westfield Township. The museum also has an easement on an additional two acres for a loop near Lake Road.

On this site, the museum collects, preserves, restores, displays and operates streetcars and other railway equipment for use by the public. Over forty railway cars and other railway equipment have been collected. Most, once restored, will be displayed and operated for the public. The collection is stored and displayed in two large "carbarns". In 1997, the museum erected the Anson W. Bennett Carhouse. In 2003, the John R. McCarthy Carhouse was erected. The collection is stored and protected from the elements in these buildings, and will be restored to its original condition. The heart of the museum's operation is a demonstration railroad. Once completed, it will contain over three miles of track, providing a five-mile round trip. To date, over a mile of track has been constructed. Building and maintaining the museum's property, track and equipment requires a number of support vehicles—trucks, tractors, and other specialized equipment. In 2000, the Rowen S. Prunkard Maintenance Facility was erected to house the fleet of internal combustion work equipment.

The museum has a master plan, to which all development conforms. The plan is conceptual and provides for public areas with visitors' center and interpretive displays, and for service areas with carbarns for service, restoration, and storage of streetcars and interurbans. Provisions have been made for both open-track and street running. This configuration provides for indoor storage of 42 full-sized electric railway cars. That density increases as smaller city equipment is included in the mix. Three of the seven planned buildings are now complete.

== Rolling stock and equipment ==
As of 2020, the museum had ten street cars, one interurban coach, and a number of rail right-of-way maintenance cars.
