= Kansas City, Clay County and St. Joseph Railway =

Former railway in Missouri, U.S.

Coordinates: 39.409212°N 94.733769°W

The Kansas City, Clay County and St. Joseph Railway was an electrified interurban railway that ran between Kansas City, Missouri, and St. Joseph, Missouri, from the early 1900s until 1933. It was the longest of the various interurbans serving Kansas City running nearly 60 miles (97 km) and extended another 10 miles (16 km) to Savannah, Missouri.

The railway was built over the course of three years by electrical engineer George Townsend, brother to writer and congressman Edward W. Townsend and composer Cornelia Townsend. The interurban was a light rail system in which single cars traveled powered by an overhead electric wire. The interurban ran hourly. Fare was $1.55 and it took nearly two hours from downtown to downtown. One line went from Kansas City to St. Joseph, another line went from Kansas City to Excelsior Springs.

The railway made Townsend wealthy. George Townsend killed himself in Kansas City, MO on June 24, 1913 by jumping into the Missouri River.

== See also ==
- List of interurbans
