= Ohio Electric Railway =

Former interurban railroad

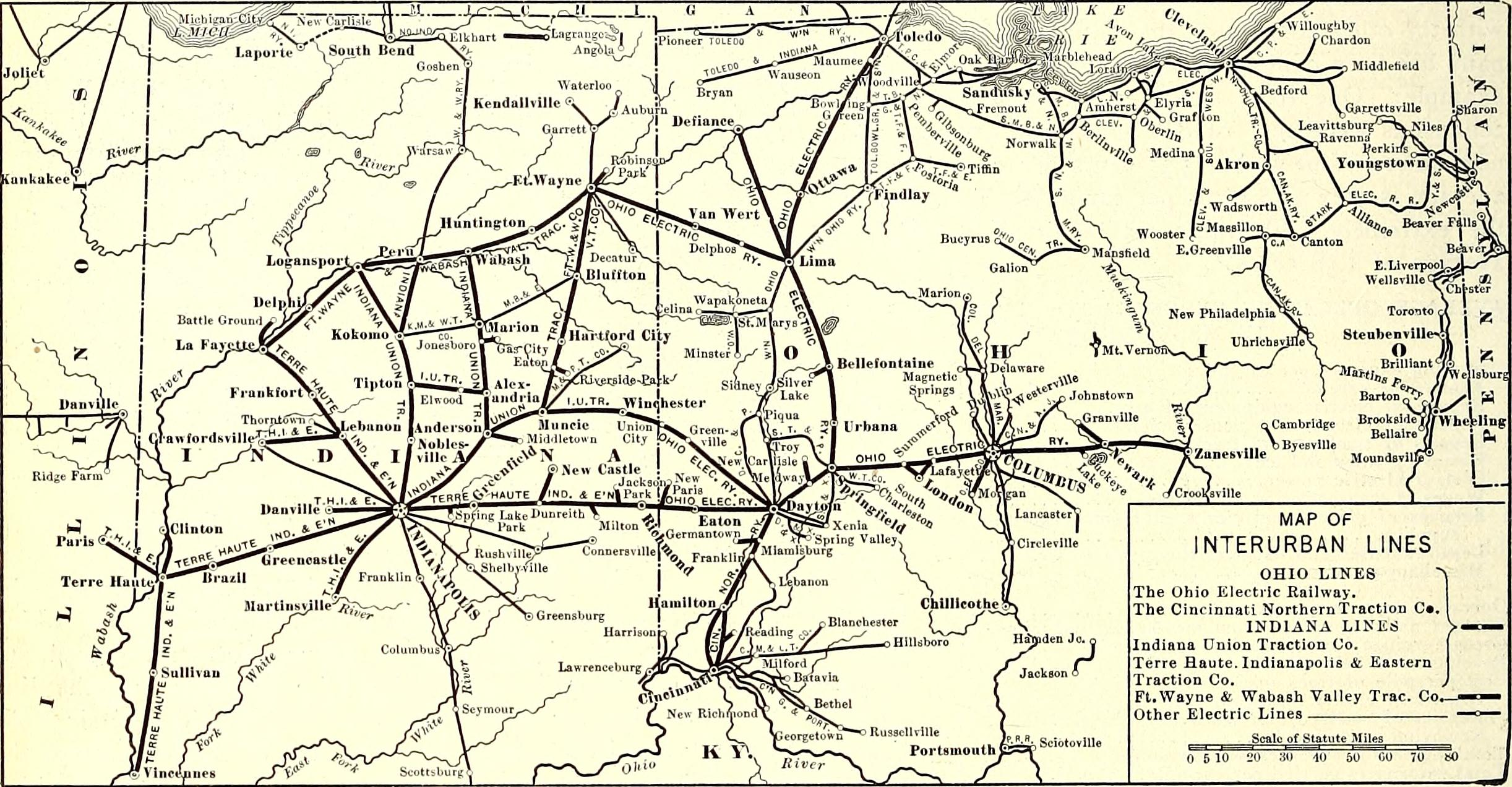
- System map from 1908

Overview
- Locale: Ohio
- Dates of operation: 1907–1921

Technical
- Track gauge: 4 ft 8 1/2 in (1,435 mm) standard gauge
- Length: 617 miles (993 km) (1909)

The Ohio Electric Railway was an interurban railroad formed in 1907 with the consolidation of 14 smaller interurban railways. It was Ohio's largest interurban, connecting Toledo, Lima, Dayton, Columbus, and Cincinnati. At its peak it operated 617 miles (993 km) of track. Never financially healthy, the company went bankrupt in 1921 and was dissolved into its constituent companies.

== History ==
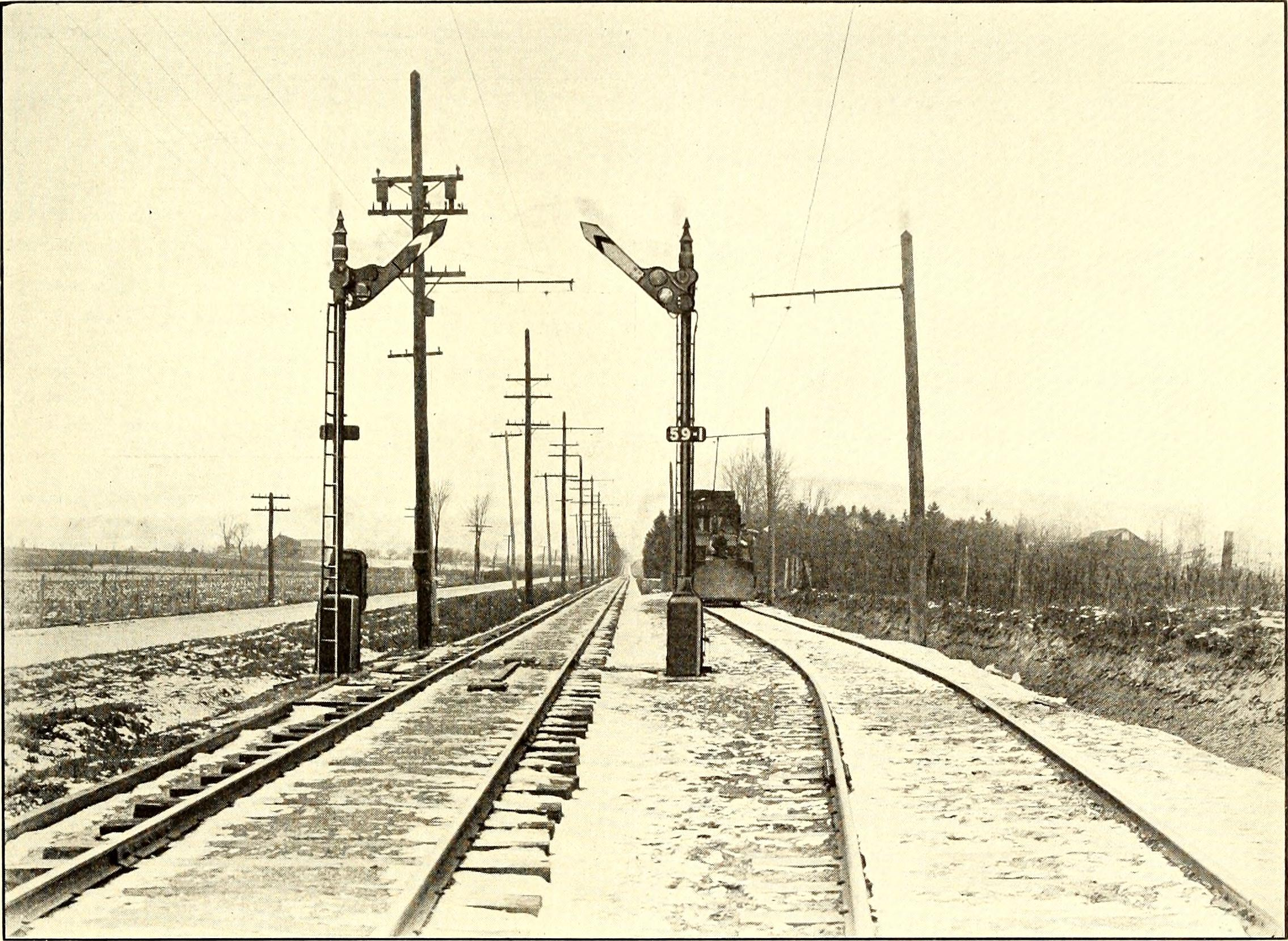
Semaphore signals at a passing siding on the Ohio Electric Railway, Electric Railway Journal 1909

The Ohio Electric Railway was formed on May 16, 1907. The organizers of the new company were Randal Morgan, W. Kesley Schoepf, and Hugh J. McGowan. Beginning in September 1907 and continuing into 1908 the new company acquired or leased the fourteen other companies which would comprise its system:

- Cincinnati, Dayton and Toledo Traction
- Columbus and Lake Michigan Railroad
- Columbus, Buckeye Lake and Newark Traction
- Columbus, Grove City and South Western Railway
- Columbus, London and Springfield Railway
- Dayton and Muncie Traction
- Dayton and Western Traction Company
- Dayton, Springfield and Urbana Electric Railway
- Fort Wayne, Van Wert and Lima Traction Company
- Indiana Columbus and Eastern Traction
- Lima and Toledo Traction
- Lima Electric Railway and Light
- Springfield and Western Railway
- Urbana, Bellefontaine and Northern Railway

The Ohio Electric proved to be financially unsound. It paid no dividends during its corporate existence and lost $1.5 million as a result of the Great Dayton Flood in 1913. In 1918 it spun off its Cincinnati–Dayton line to the Cincinnati and Dayton Traction company. This trend continued in 1920 when spun off the Dayton and Western Traction in its entirety. The end came in 1921: the company went bankrupt and dissolved. Most of the constituent companies went bankrupt as well, but continued operating. Several companies would later come together to form the Cincinnati and Lake Erie Railroad in 1930. However, business conditions of the Great Depression in the 1930s led to the complete replacement of interurbans with buses by 1939. The company changed its name to Cincinnati & Lake Erie Transportation, and it was absorbed by Greyhound in 1947.

== See also ==
- Cincinnati and Lake Erie Railroad
- Roche de Boeuf Interurban Bridge
