= Aurora, Plainfield and Joliet Railroad =

Interurban railroad in Illinois, United States

Aurora, Plainfield & Joliet

Overview
- Status: Defunct
- Locale: Fox River Valley
- Termini: Aurora, Illinois; Joliet, Illinois

Service
- Type: Interurban

History
- Opened: October 21, 1904
- Closed: 1924

Technical
- Line length: 22 miles (35 km)
- Track gauge: 4 ft 8 1/2 in (1,435 mm) standard gauge
- Electrification: Trolley wire

The Aurora, Plainfield and Joliet was a 22-mile (35 km) interurban railroad which operated between its namesake cities of Aurora, Illinois, Plainfield and Joliet in northern Illinois from October 21, 1904, to 1924.

== History ==
In May 1901, the Joliet, Plainfield and Aurora Railroad Company was incorporated with the intent of constructing an interurban railroad from Joliet to Aurora. The principal office was in Joliet and the capital stock was set at $50,000. The incorporators and board of directors were Frederick E. Fisher, Louis H. Mottinger, Frederick E. Stoddard, Eneshia Meers, and William H. Hounall, all of Joliet. On April 26, 1902, the Joliet, Plainfield and Aurora secured a fifty-year franchise from the Joliet highway commissioners with construction scheduled to be done that summer.

Construction was handled by the Fisher Construction Company. By January 1904, the JP&A was looking to construct 10 miles (16 km) of track after having contracted for rails, ties, and line poles. A brick car house and repair shop was to be erected at Plainfield.

Frederick E. Fisher (who had held the position of general manager for the Chicago and Joliet Electric Railway for six years, in addition to being the president of the JP&A and the general manager of the Fisher Construction Company) tended his resignation from the Chicago and Joliet Electric effective April 1, 1904, in order to focus on completing the JP&A. Work began on April 1, with track being laid from the center of Plainfield west to the DuPage River and approximately 2 miles (3.2 km) of right-of-way were graded west of the river by the end of the month. The DuPage River would be crossed by a 155-foot (47 m) steel bridge to be constructed by the American Bridge Company which was expected to be in place by May 5. West of the river, track laying was planned to have reached Normantown by May 15 and Aurora by July 1.

The Joliet, Aurora and Plainfield line was expected to be in operation by September 1904, but the start of service was ultimately delayed until October 21, 1904. After being in operation for fewer than three full months, beginning Tuesday, January 17, 1905, the new interurban line began handling mail from Aurora to Joliet. Prior to this, the Elgin, Joliet and Eastern Railway had this contract.

By November 1905, officials from the JP&A were planning to operate an "automobile line" for the winter of 1905–06 between Yorkville, Plainfield, Sandwich, and Hinkley. If successful, an electric system would have been employed.

Prior to 1914, the Joliet, Aurora and Plainfield had become one of two divisions of the Joliet and Southern Electric Interurban Railroad. (The other was a line from Joliet to Chicago Heights.) Joint operation did not last long and both divisions were put up for sale. On Thursday, June 11, 1914, a new entity, the Aurora, Plainfield and Joliet Railroad, was incorporated by the secretary of state. The AP&J assumed control and operation of the Aurora-Joliet line.

Settlements from a collision in Joliet in which several passengers died crippled the finances of the line and the railroad had operated at a loss since 1914. Automobile competition was also a large factor. By 1924, the AP&J wanted to suspend operation and switch to buses. When the motion was brought before the Illinois Commerce Commission on July 1, 1924, there were no objectors to junking the line.
