= List of Public Service Corporation of New Jersey precursors =

These companies were all leased by or merged into the Public Service Corporation of New Jersey, a street railway company. Some companies were leased or merged after they were bustituted; those are not listed here.

== Public Service Railway ==
=== Jersey City, Hoboken and Paterson Railway ===
- Bergen Turnpike Company
- New Jersey Electric Railway
  - Jersey City, Hoboken and Rutherford Electric Railway
  - Paterson, Passaic and Rutherford Electric Railway
    - Grant Street Electric Railway
    - Passaic, Rutherford and Carlstadt Electric Railway
    - Paterson and Little Falls Electric Railway
    - Paterson and Passaic Electric Railway
    - Paterson, Rutherford and Carlstadt Electric Railway
    - People's Park Railway
- North Hudson County Railway
  - Hudson and Bergen Traction Company
  - Palisades Railroad
  - Pavonia Horse Railroad
- Paterson Horse Railroad
- Paterson Railway
  - Paterson City Railroad
  - Paterson, Garfield and Clinton Railway
  - Paterson and Passaic Railroad
- Paterson Central Electric Railway
  - Central Electric Railway
  - Paterson Central Railway
- Paterson and State Line Traction Company
- Saddle River Traction Company
- White Line Traction Company

=== North Jersey Street Railway ===
- Consolidated Traction Company of New Jersey
  - Jersey City, Harrison and Kearney Railway
  - New Jersey Traction Company
    - Jersey City and Bergen Railroad
    - Newark Passenger Railway
      - Elizabeth Passenger Railway
      - Essex Passenger Railway
      - Hudson and Bergen Railway
      - Newark and Irvington Street Railway
      - Rapid Transit Railway of the City of Newark
  - Newark Plank Road Company
  - Newark and South Orange Railway
    - Newark, South Orange, Ferry Street and Hamilton Place Railroad
      - Newark and South Orange Horse Car Railroad
  - Passaic and Newark Electric Traction Company
    - Passaic and Newark Electric Railway
  - South Orange and Maplewood Traction Company

=== Orange and Passaic Valley Railway ===
- Suburban Traction Company
