= List of New Jersey street railroads =

The following street, interurban, or other electric railways operated in New Jersey. Companies marked (PS) were or became part of the Public Service Corporation of New Jersey.

- American Railways Company
- Asbury Park and Belmar Street Railway
- Asbury Park and Sea Girt Railroad
- Atlantic City Electric Railway
- Atlantic City and Ocean City Railroad
- Atlantic City and Shore Railroad
- Atlantic City and Suburban Traction Company
- Atlantic City Transportation Company
- Atlantic Coast Electric Railroad
- Atlantic Coast Electric Railway
- Atlantic Highlands, Red Bank and Long Branch Electric Railway
- Atlantic and Suburban Railway
- Bay Head and Point Pleasant Street Railway
- Bergen County Traction Company (PS)
- Bergen Turnpike Company (PS)
- Bridgeton and Millville Traction Company
- Bridgeton Rapid Transit Company
- Brigantine Transit Company
- Brigantine Transportation Company
- Brunswick Traction Company (PS)
- Burlington County Railway
- Burlington County Transit Company
- Burlington County Traction Company
- Camden and Atlantic Railroad (freight railroad with streetcars)
- Camden, Gloucester and Woodbury Railway (PS)
- Camden Horse Railroad (PS)
- Camden and Suburban Railway (PS)
- Camden and Trenton Railway (PS)
- Cape May, Delaware Bay and Sewell's Point Railroad
- Cape May and Schellinger's Landing Railroad
- Cape May and Sewell's Point Railroad
- Cape May Transportation Company
- Central Electric Railway (PS)
- Central Passenger Railway
- City Railway
- Clinton Avenue Horse Railway
- Coast Cities Railway
- Consolidated Traction Company of New Jersey (PS)
- Cumberland Traction Company
- Delaware Bay and Cape May Railroad
- Delaware Valley Traction Company
- East Jersey Street Railway (PS)
- East Jersey Traction Company (PS)
- Easton and Washington Traction Company
- Elizabeth Street Railway (PS)
- Elizabeth City Horse Railroad (PS)
- Elizabeth and Newark Horse Railroad
- Elizabeth Passenger Railway (PS)
- Elizabeth, Plainfield and Central Jersey Railway (PS)
- Elizabeth and Raritan River Street Railway (PS)
- Elizabeth and Trenton Railroad (PS)
- Essex Passenger Railway (PS)
- Ewing Passenger Railway
- Five Mile Beach Electric Railway
- Grant Street Electric Railway (PS)
- Hamilton Township Street Railway
- Hoboken and Manhattan Railroad
- Hudson and Bergen Railway (PS)
- Hudson and Bergen Traction Company (PS)
- Hudson and Manhattan Railroad
- Hudson and Manhattan Railway
- Hudson River Traction Company (PS)
- Jersey Central Traction Company
- Jersey City and Bergen Railroad (PS)
- Jersey City, Harrison and Kearney Railway (PS)
- Jersey City, Hoboken and Paterson Street Railway (PS)
- Jersey City, Hoboken and Rutherford Electric Railway (PS)
- Keyport and Matawan Street Railway
- Lakewood and Seashore Railroad
- Middlesex and Somerset Traction Company (PS)
- Millville Rapid Transit Company
- Millville Traction Company
- Mercer County Traction Company
- Monmouth County Electric Railway
- Monmouth Traction Company
- Morris County Traction Company
- Mount Holly Street Railway
- Mountain Railway
- Mulberry Street Passenger Railway
- New Brunswick City Railway (PS)
- New Jersey and Hudson River Railway and Ferry Company (PS)
- New Jersey Interurban Company
- New Jersey and Pennsylvania Traction Company
- New Jersey Rapid Transit Company (PS)
- New Jersey Short Line Railroad (PS)
- New Jersey Traction Company (PS)
- New Jersey Transit
- New York – Philadelphia Company (PS)
- New York and Philadelphia Traction Company (PS)
- Newark, Bloomfield and Montclair Horse Railroad
- Newark and Franklin Horse Railroad
- Newark and Hackensack Traction Company (PS)
- Newark and Irvington Street Railway (PS)
- Newark Passenger Railway (PS)
- Newark Plank Road Company (PS)
- Newark and South Orange Horse Car Railroad (PS)
- Newark and South Orange Railway (PS)
- Newark, South Orange, Ferry Street and Hamilton Place Railroad (PS)
- North Hudson County Railway (PS)
- North Jersey Rapid Transit Company (PS)
- North Jersey Street Railway (PS)
- Northampton–Easton and Washington Traction Company
- Ocean City Electric Railroad
- Ocean City Electric Railway
- Ocean Street Passenger Railway
- Ogden Mine Railroad Company
- Orange Crosstown and Orange Valley Street Railway
- Orange Mountain Traction Company
- Orange and Newark Railroad (PS)
- Orange and Passaic Valley Railway (PS)
- Palisades Railroad (PS)
- Passaic, Garfield and Clifton Electric Railway (PS)
- Passaic and Newark Electric Railway (PS)
- Passaic and Newark Electric Traction Company (PS)
- Passaic, Rutherford and Carlstadt Electric Railway (PS)
- Paterson Horse Railroad (PS)
- Paterson Railway (PS)
- Paterson Central Railway (PS)
- Paterson Central Electric Railway (PS)
- Paterson City Railroad (PS)
- Paterson, Garfield and Clifton Railway (PS)
- Paterson and Little Falls Electric Railway (PS)
- Paterson and Passaic Electric Railway (PS)
- Paterson and Passaic Railroad (PS)
- Paterson, Passaic and Rutherford Electric Railway (PS)
- Paterson, Rutherford and Carlstadt Electric Railway (PS)
- Paterson and State Line Traction Company (PS)
- Paulsboro Traction Company
- Pavonia Horse Railroad (PS)
- Pennington Avenue Passenger Railway
- People's Elevating Company (PS)
- People's Park Railway (PS)
- Perth Amboy Railway (PS)
- Plainfield Street Railway (PS)
- Point Pleasant Traction Company
- Princeton Street Railway
- Public Service Coordinated Transport (PS)
- Public Service Corporation of New Jersey (PS)
- Public Service Railroad (PS)
- Public Service Railway (PS)
- Rahway Electric Street Railway (PS)
- Rapid Transit Railway of the City of Newark (PS)
- Raritan Traction Company (PS)
- Ridgefield and Teaneck Railway (PS)
- Riverside Traction Company (PS)
- Rutherford Railway (PS)
- Saddle River Traction Company (PS)
- Salem and Pennsgrove Traction Company
- Seacoast Traction Company
- Seashore Electric Railway
- South Clinton Avenue and Broad Street Railway
- South Jersey Street Railway
- South Jersey Traction Company
- South Orange and Maplewood Traction Company (PS)
- Suburban Traction Company (PS)
- Transport of New Jersey
- Trenton, Hamilton and Ewing Traction Company
- Trenton Horse Railroad
- Trenton, Lakewood and Atlantic Railway
- Trenton, Lakewood and Seacoast Railway
- Trenton, Lawrenceville and Princeton Railroad
- Trenton, Lawrenceville and Princeton Extension Railroad
- Trenton and Mercer County Traction Corporation
- Trenton and New Brunswick Railroad (PS)
- Trenton, New Hope and Lambertville Street Railway
- Trenton Passenger Railway
- Trenton, Pennington and Hopewell Street Railway
- Trenton–Princeton Traction Company
- Trenton Street Railway
- Trenton Terminal Railroad (PS)
- Trenton Transit Company
- Union Traction Company (PS) Originally the line was to run from Hackensack to Kearny, New Jersey but the company became insolvent and was merged into other trolley lines before the line could be fully built.
- West End and Long Branch Railway
- West Jersey Traction Company (PS)
- Westfield and Elizabeth Street Railway (PS)
- White Line Traction Company (PS)
- Woodbridge and Sewaren Street Railway (PS)
- Yardley, Morrisville and Trenton Street Railway

== See also ==
- List of Public Service Corporation of New Jersey precursors
