= Union Traction Company =

Union Traction Company may refer to

- Union Traction Company (New Jersey)
- Union Traction Company (Santa Cruz)
- Union Traction Company, precursor to the Indiana Railroad
