= Jersey Central Traction Company =

The Jersey Central Traction Company was a streetcar company in central New Jersey, with its main lines from Red Bank and Highlands to Perth Amboy.

== Lines ==
The main line began in Perth Amboy, at the corner of Smith Street and Davidson Avenue (Public Service's #3 and #5 lines operated on Smith Street). It went south on Davidson Avenue, west on Market Street, and south on Sheridan Street and over the Raritan River on a low bridge. The south side of the bridge connected to Scott Avenue; the line turned east on Stevens Ave, crossing Public Service's #1 line at Main Street.

The line out of South Amboy is unknown. It eventually got to what is now Route 35 and followed it into Monmouth County; the truss bridge that now carries Route 35 northbound over the New York and Long Branch Railroad in Sayreville was probably built for it. The line left Route 35 between County Road and Cliffwood Avenue, running just to the east where South Amboy Road, Sweetbriar Street and Bridge Avenue run, joining Front Street at Matawan Creek. It ran through Keyport on Front Street, Broad Street and 1st Street.

=== Keyport-Middletown-Highlands ===
From Keyport the line ran east alongside the New Jersey Southern Railroad (NJS, part of the Jersey Central Railroad) tracks to Belford near the junction of the NJS Port Monmouth-Red Bank. From here the line went south along Main St to Campbell's Junction. The Stone Church Branch departed east along Valley Drive (now Leonardville Road), shifted northward towards the NJS line to Atlantic Highlands in Leonardo between Concord and Hosford Aves and then continued along Valley Drive to Stone Church at Claypit Creek with another short section to Highlands via Navesink Ave around to Portland Rd overlooking the river inlet. Later a connection was made to Atlantic Highlands.

=== Middletown-Red Bank-Rumson ===
The main line from Campbell's Junction continued south towards Middletown Village on Tindall Road joining the King's Highway (today's NJ-35) south to Red Bank. A trestle built alongside Cooper's Bridge allowed trolleys to cross the Navesink River. The line moved along Bridge Ave to meet with the New York and Long Branch Railroad (current North Jersey Coast Line) at the train station. From here the line split again. A branch headed east along Monmouth St. The line wrapped around multiple blocks using West St and Broad St to join Front St/River Rd towards Fair Haven and Rumson.

=== Red Bank-Eatontown-Long Branch ===
The main line headed west on Monmouth and continued south via Shrewsbury Ave to Eatontown along Main St. The line then turned east onto Broad St (then Broadway) which lead onto Eatontown Blvd into West Long Branch and on to Long Branch as Broadway.

== History ==
Until November 1901, the company was known as the Keyport and Matawan Street Railway, incorporated March 26, 1891. The line, originally horse-powered, was electrified on July 4, 1901.

The line to Highlands opened on September 1, 1907.

The line originally ended in South Amboy; an extension over the Raritan River opened on July 10, 1910, and was shared by Public Service north of Main Street in South Amboy.

In 1917, the American Railways Company bought the line. Operations ended in 1923.

== See also ==
- List of New Jersey street railroads
