= Lincoln Highway Hackensack River Bridge =

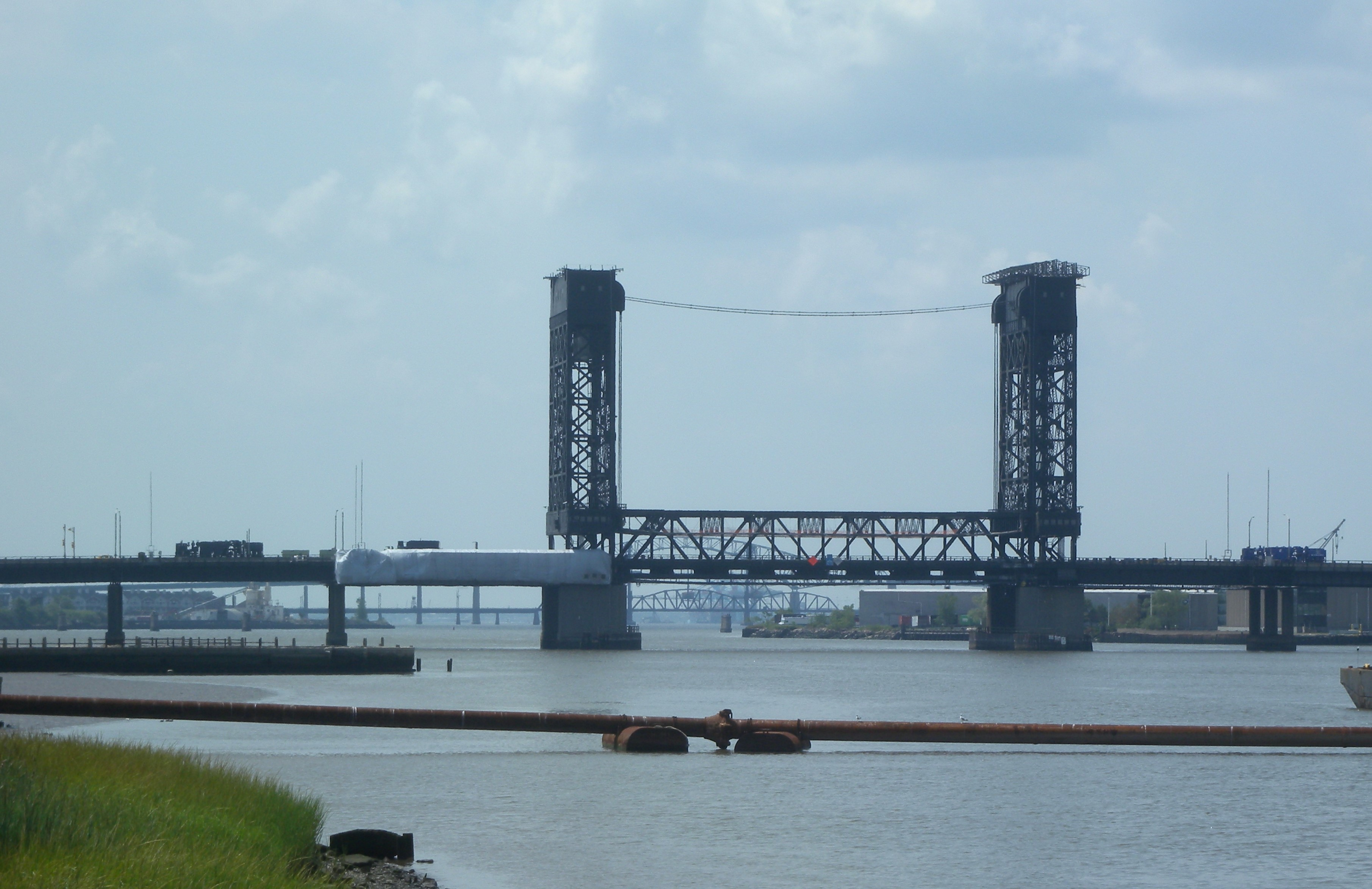
- Coordinates: 40°43′38″N 74°5′56″W
- Carries: US 1/9 Truck; Lincoln Highway; East Coast Greenway
- Crosses: Hackensack River
- Locale: Jersey City and Kearny
- Other name(s): Shawn Carson and Robert Nguyen Memorial Bridge; Route 1&9 Lincoln Highway Bridge; Rte 1&9 Hackensack River Bridge
- Owner: New Jersey Department of Transportation

Characteristics
- Design: Vertical lift
- Material: Steel
- Total length: 1,480.1 feet (451.1 m)
- Width: 73.5 feet (22.4 m)
- Height: 75 feet (23 m)
- Longest span: 222.1 feet (67.7 m)
- Clearance above: 16.2 feet (4.9 m)
- Clearance below: 35 feet (11 m) (mean high water); 40 feet (12 m) (mean low water)

History
- Construction start: 1951
- Construction end: 1954

Location
- Interactive map of Lincoln Highway Hackensack River Bridge

The Lincoln Highway Hackensack River Bridge is a vehicular vertical lift bridge crossing the Hackensack River at a point 1.8 mi (2.9 km) from the river mouth at Newark Bay in Hudson County, New Jersey, United States. The bridge, along the route of the Lincoln Highway, carries U.S. Route 1/9 Truck (at milepoint 1.72) and the East Coast Greenway between the West Side of Jersey City and Kearny Point in Kearny. The most recent of many crossings at the location, the current bridge was completed in 1954. It is owned by and operated by the New Jersey Department of Transportation (NJDOT), and is required by the Title 33 of the Code of Federal Regulations to open on signal for maritime traffic. In 2007 it was designated the Shawn Carson and Robert Nguyen Memorial Bridge.

== Location ==
The Lincoln Highway Bridge crosses the Hackensack River in the vicinity of the river's Droyer's Reach and Marion Reach. Along the east bank of the river Hudson Mall and Droyer's Point lie to the south of the bridge, and Lincoln Park and the Marion Section lie to the north. The west bank at Kearny Point is an industrial and distribution warehouse area. During the first half of the 20th century it was a site of yards of the Federal Shipbuilding and Drydock Company. The eastern approach to the bridge is fed by Communipaw Avenue (CR 612) from the east, Route 440 from the south, and Route 1/9 Truck from the north. The bridge is an important component in the transportation of goods in the Port of New York and New Jersey. The Lincoln Highway Passaic River Bridge crosses the Passaic River to Port Newark and Newark Airport. Since the nearby Pulaski Skyway prohibits trucks they often use Route 1/9 Truck to serve the numerous intermodal freight transport facilities in the New Jersey Meadowlands and to access the Holland Tunnel.

== Early roads and crossings ==
In 1765, the Assembly of the Province of New Jersey authorised construction of a new plank road connecting the city of Newark to the Hudson Waterfront at Paulus Hook (now Exchange Place in Jersey City). It incorporated an existing road, now Ferry Street (Newark), on the west bank of the Passaic River and another across the southern tip of New Barbadoes Neck to the Hackensack. From the Hackensack the road travelled eastward over Bergen Hill and connected with another colonial turnpike, later known as Bergen Point Plank Road, at Communipaw Junction in what was then Bergen Township. Cable ferry service preceded the construction of the first fixed crossing in the immediate vicinity of the current bridge. The crossing was known as Brown's Ferry for the man who operated the ferries across the rivers. Built in the early 19th century, the Morris Canal route crossed the rivers parallel to the ferry crossing, and later, the turnpike bridges.

== First, fallen and failed bridges ==
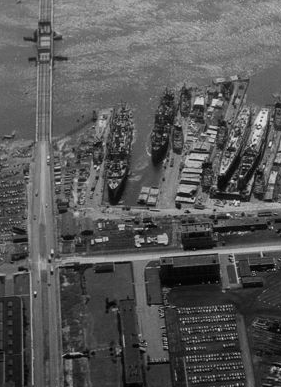
1945 view of Lincoln Highway with Federal Shipbuilding and Drydock Company at right

In 1849 a charter was granted by the New Jersey General Assembly to a corporation to upgrade and operate the toll road, which became known as the Newark Plank Road. Soon after, the "Newark Plank Road and Ferry Company" requested and received permission to build bridges over the Hackensack and Passaic rivers, a request contested by stockholders of the rival "Proprietors of Bridges over the Rivers Passaic and Hackensack", which operated the Newark Turnpike over the rivers and Hackensack Meadows. They maintained that a monopoly for bridges had been granted in their 1790s charter. A bridge across the Hackensack was built by 1856, but one across the Passaic was the subject of litigation. A survey published in 1865 described the Hackensack bridge as a wooden half-pivot draw.

Streetcar service along the plank road was initiated in 1895 by a predecessor of the Public Service Railway, later becoming part of its Newark-Jersey City Line (#1). (Today's New Jersey Transit bus service #1 retains the number along the route.) A new bridge was constructed in 1906.

During the Good Roads Movement the road and bridges were again renewed in conjunction with the creation of the Lincoln Highway, the first transcontinental highway in the USA. On December 13, 1913 New Jersey dedicated the new "Lincoln Way" after having spent $1.25 million on a widening and re-paving project in the northeastern part of the state. By the early 1920s this part of the route of the Lincoln Highway, including the bridges spanning the rivers, was among the most heavily used roads in the United States. A survey conducted in 1920 by county officials counted 11,000 crossings of the river in a 15-hour period. In 1921 it was reported that a survey had counted 12,000 crossing in a busy period, and 4,011 one-way crossings within one hour.

On June 22, 1922 the 150 feet (46 m) steamship Glenaruel collided with the bridge, first hitting the bulkhead and then swerving to hit the span which had been opened to let it pass. The iron structure toppled and was considered irreparable. The destroyed structure was replaced in 1927 with a double leaf bascule bridge. In little more than a year's time, on December 15, 1928, that bridge failed when the east leaf of the bridge and its trunnion fell into the river. It was later determined that the design of the bridge was capable of bearing loads crossing the roadway but not of handling the stresses of opening and closing the bridge, which had led to metal fatigue.

== Operations ==
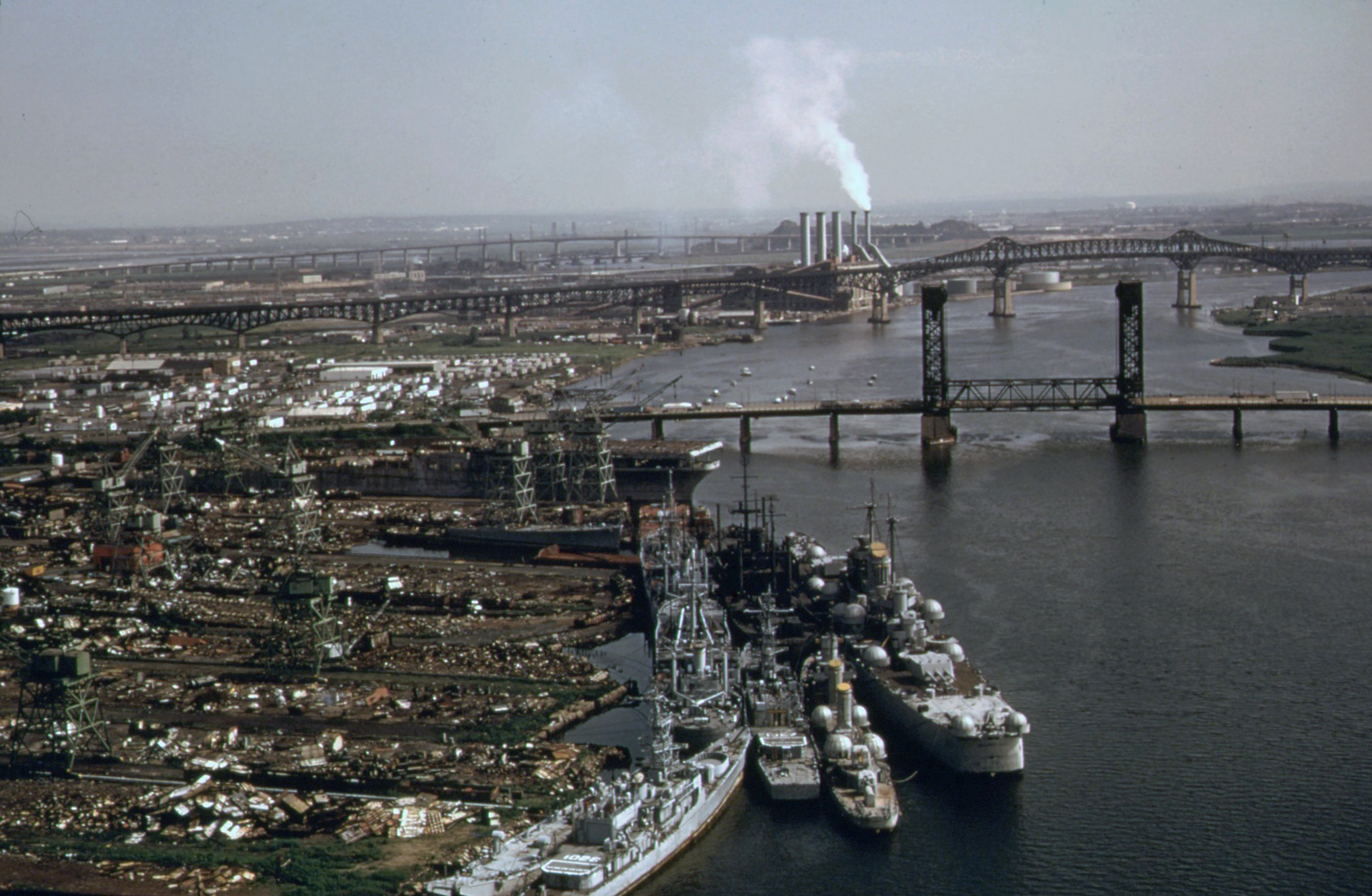
1974 view

Construction of the current vertical lift bridge began in 1951. It cost approximately $8 million to build and was opened in June 1954 with a ceremony officiated by Governor Robert B. Meyner Built of steel and concrete, it is 1,480.1 feet (451.1 m) long, 73.5 feet (22.4 m) tall, and 75 feet (23 m) wide. It carries the six-lane highway designated U.S. Route 1/9 Truck and part of the East Coast Greenway. The bridge was rehabilitated in 2003. Repairs to steel work and repainting funded by the American Recovery and Reinvestment Act of 2009 were conducted in 2009-2011. The central span between dual towers of black steel is horizontally raised and lowered by engines and counterweights. The design of the structure recalls the industrial era of America.

The bridge's lift span is 222.1 feet (67.7 m) long. It and that of the next upstream vehicular vertical bridge (the Wittpenn) are required by federal regulations be raised on demand at all times. The Lower Hackensack River is channelized to MP 3.4, where there is a turning basin. At one time the river was major waterway for the Port of New York and New Jersey. It remains partially navigable for commercial maritime traffic, notably coal deliveries to the Hudson Generating Station. In 1936, the predecessor to the current bridge is reported to have opened as frequently as 48 times per day. In 2005, the Lincoln Highway Bridge opened 20-30 times per month. As of 2014, the bridge opened 1000 per year.

== Accident and dedication ==
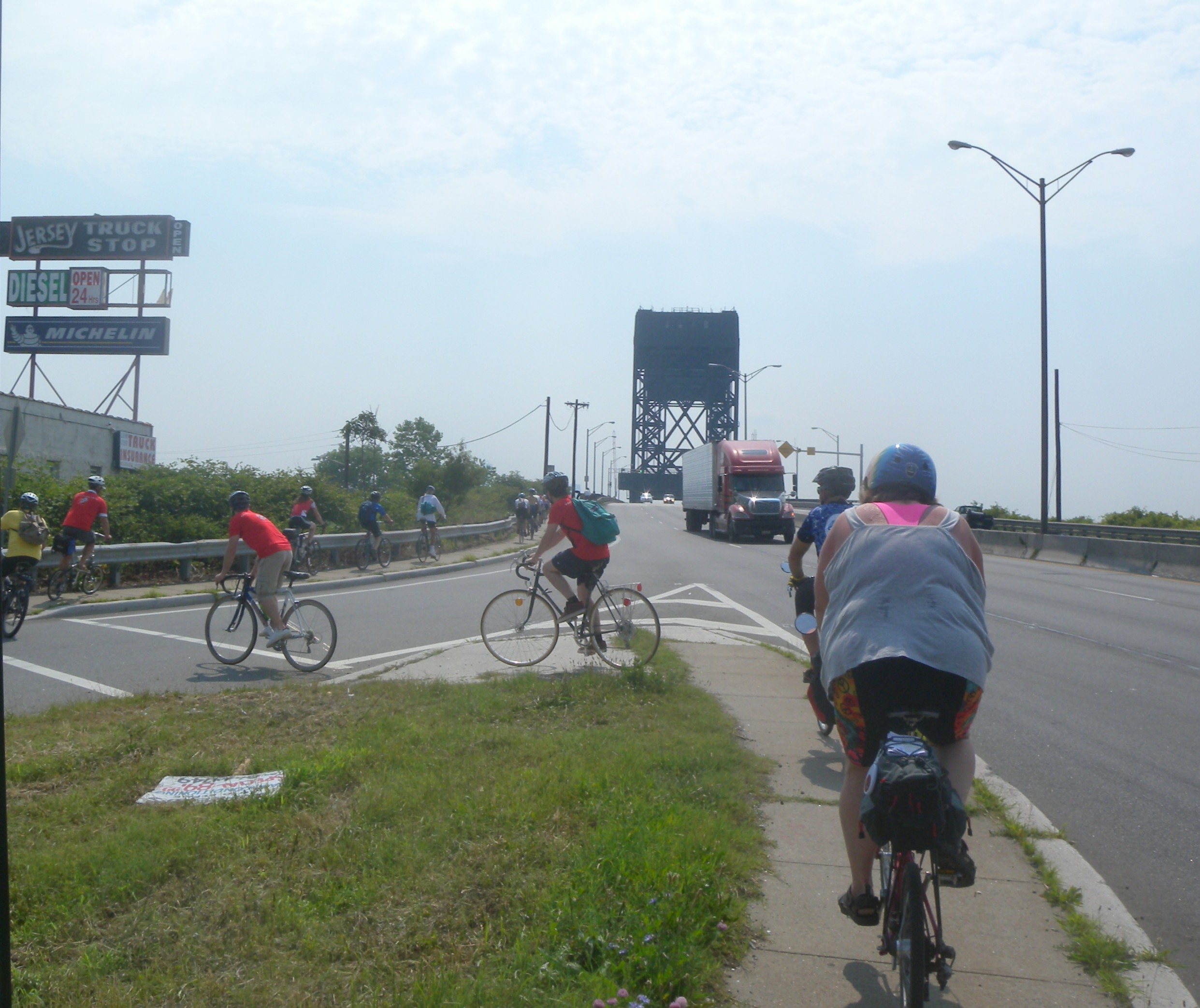
Approaching from west

On December 25, 2005, two Jersey City police officers died while on duty after their rescue vehicle plunged into the river from the bridge. Shawn Carson and Robert Nguyen were summoned by colleagues to bring additional flares to the western approach to the bridge to better regulate traffic. Extreme weather conditions had caused poor visibility, and the gate that normally lowers when the bridge is in the open position had been malfunctioning for some time. The officers drove across the bridge and delivered the flares. They did not know that the lift span had then been raised, and as they were making their return trip, their vehicle went over the edge of the open bridge. While the body of Carsen was recovered approximately 90 minutes after the accident, that of Nguyen was not found until December 29. After an investigation the bridgetenders were cleared of any wrongdoing in January 2006. According to the NJDOT, the barrier was experiencing continuous problems due to an earlier accident, and the agency was waiting for replacement equipment to do repairs. Unsatisfied with the agency's findings, the Jersey City Police found that the NJDOT, knowing that there were problems, should not have relied on local police for public safety. A new barrier gate was eventually installed in June 2006. On May 9, 2007, the New Jersey Legislature adopted a joint resolution designating the crossing the "Shawn Carson and Robert Nguyen Memorial Bridge".

== See also ==
- List of bridges, tunnels, and cuts in Hudson County, New Jersey
- List of crossings of the Hackensack River
- List of crossings of the Lower Passaic River
- List of fixed crossings of the North River (Hudson River)
