= Presidency of Rutherford B. Hayes =

U.S. presidential administration from 1877 to 1881

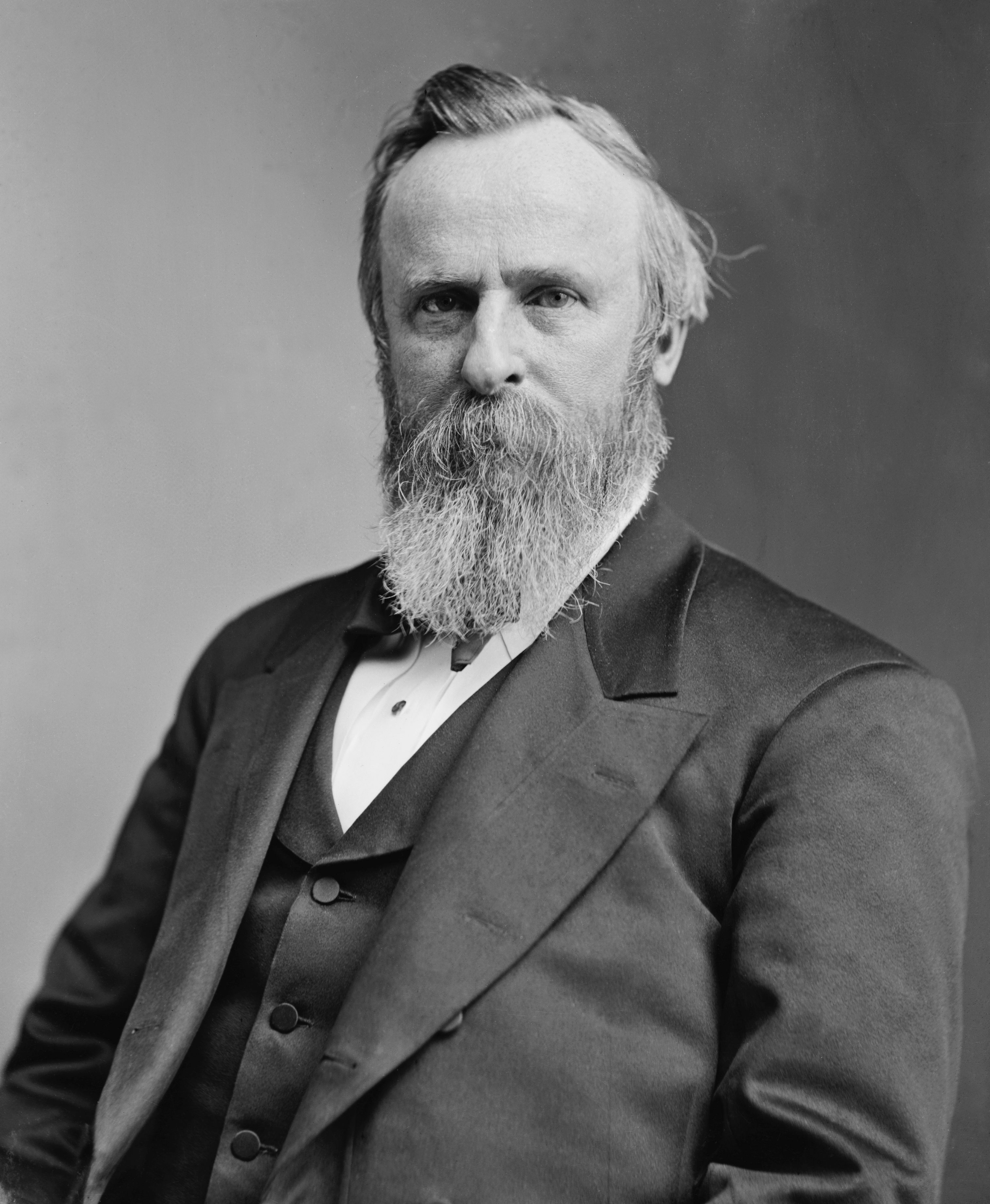
- Presidency of Rutherford B. Hayes; March 4, 1877 – March 4, 1881
- Vice President: William A. Wheeler
- Cabinet: See list
- Party: Republican
- Election: 1876
- Seat: White House
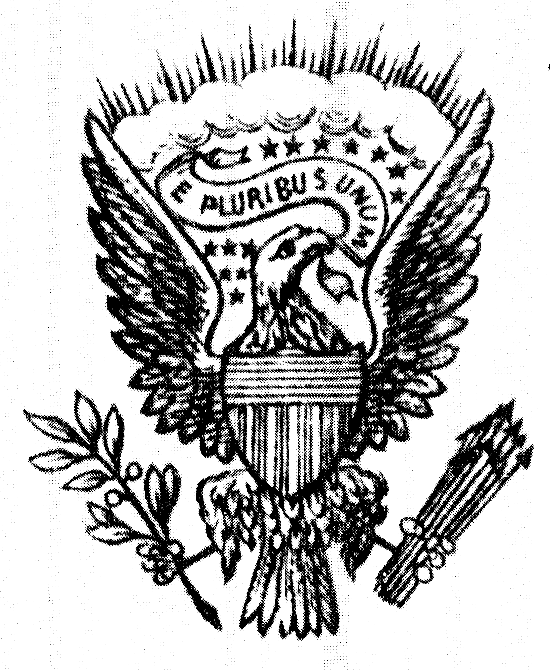
- Presidential coat of arms (1877–1913)

Rutherford B. Hayes served as the 19th president of the United States from March 4, 1877, to March 4, 1881. Hayes, a Republican, took office after his narrow electoral college victory in the 1876 presidential election. This contentious election resulted in the Compromise of 1877, where Hayes agreed to pull federal troops out of the Southern United States, thus ending the Reconstruction era. Hayes declined to seek re-election and was succeeded by James A. Garfield.

In general, Hayes was a moderate and a pragmatist. He kept the promise to withdraw the last federal troops from the South, as Democrats took control of the last three Republican states. He sponsored civil service reform, where he challenged the patronage hungry Republican politicians. Though he failed to enact long-term reform, he helped generate public support for the eventual passage of the Pendleton Civil Service Reform Act in 1883. The Republican Party in the South grew steadily weaker as his efforts to support the civil rights of blacks in the South were largely stymied by Democrats in Congress.

Insisting that maintenance of the gold standard was essential to economic recovery, he opposed Greenbacks (paper money not backed by gold or silver) and vetoed the Bland–Allison Act that called for more silver in the money supply. Congress overrode his veto, but monetary policy during his administration can broadly be described as a balance between inflationists and advocates of hard money. He used federal troops cautiously to avoid violence in the Great Railroad Strike of 1877, one of the largest labor strikes in U.S. history. It marked the end of the economic depression called the "Panic of 1873". Prosperity marked the rest of his term. His policy toward Native Americans emphasized minimizing fraud. He continued Grant's "peace plan" and anticipated the assimilationist program of the Dawes Act of 1887. In foreign policy, he was a moderate who took few initiatives. He unsuccessfully opposed the De Lesseps plan for building a Panama Canal, which he thought should be an American only program, Hayes asserted U.S. influence in Latin America and the continuing primacy of the Monroe Doctrine. Polls of historians and political scientists generally rank Hayes as an average president.

== Election of 1876 ==
=== Nomination and general election ===
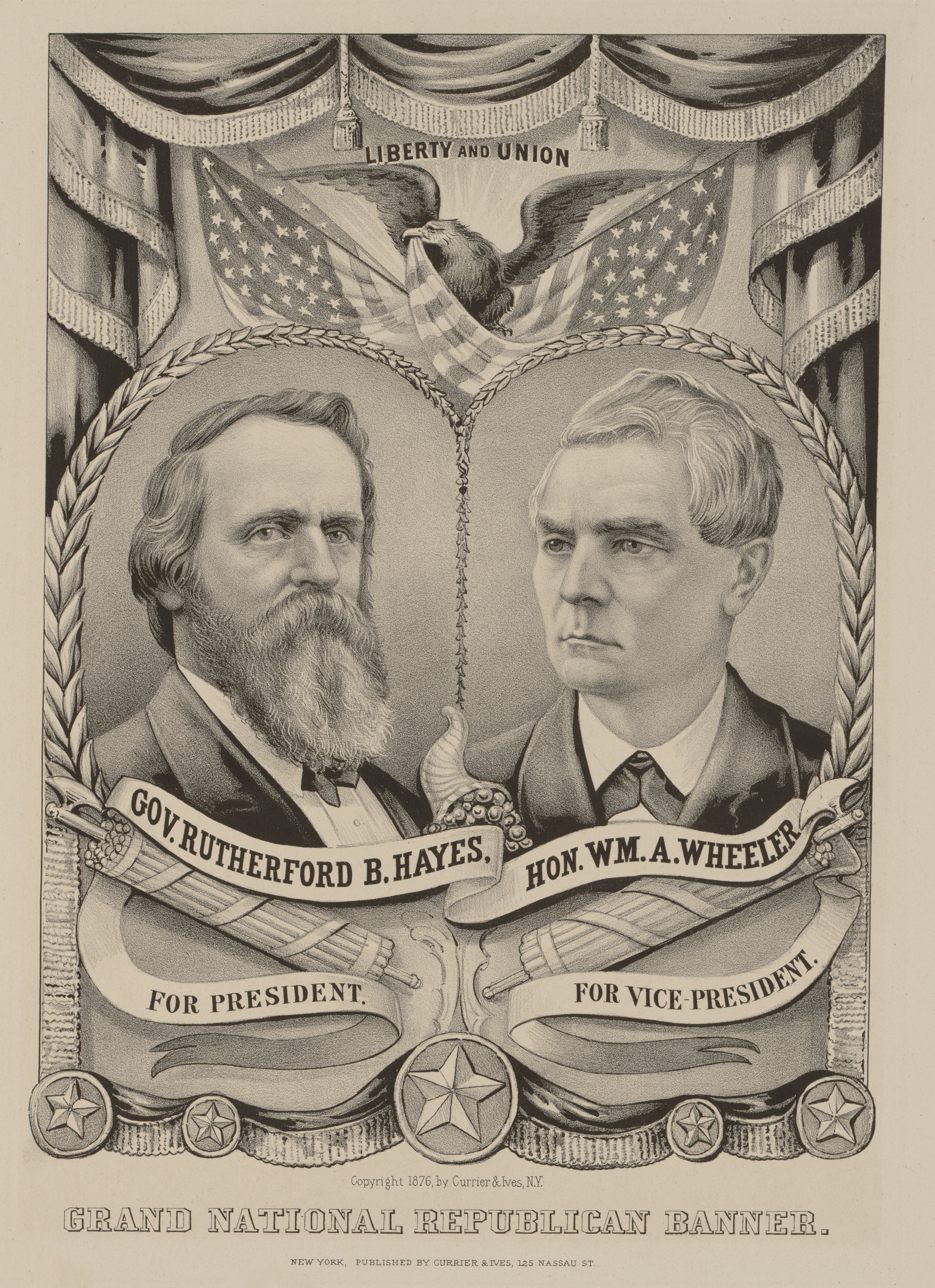
Hayes-Wheeler campaign poster

With the retirement of President Ulysses S. Grant after two terms, the Republicans had to settle on a new candidate for the 1876 election. Hayes's success as governor of the key swing state of Ohio elevated him to the top ranks of Republican politicians under consideration for the presidency, alongside James G. Blaine of Maine, Senator Oliver P. Morton of Indiana, and Senator Roscoe Conkling of New York. The Ohio delegation to the 1876 Republican National Convention was united behind Hayes, and Senator John Sherman did all in his power to aid the nomination of his fellow Ohioan. In June 1876, the Republican National Convention assembled in Hayes's hometown of Cincinnati, with Blaine as the favorite. Hayes placed fifth on the first ballot of the convention, behind Blaine, Morton, Secretary of the Treasury Benjamin Bristow, and Conkling. After six ballots, Blaine remained in the lead, but on the seventh ballot, Blaine's adversaries rallied around Hayes, granting him the presidential nomination. For the vice presidency, the convention selected Representative William A. Wheeler, a man about whom Hayes had recently asked, "I am ashamed to say: who is Wheeler?"

Hayes's views were largely in accord with the party platform, which called for equal rights regardless of race or gender, a continuation of Reconstruction, the prohibition of public funding for sectarian schools, and the resumption of specie payments. Hayes's nomination was well received by the press, with even Democratic papers describing Hayes as honest and likable. In a public letter accepting the nomination, Hayes vowed to support civil service reform and pledged to serve for only one term. The Democratic nominee was Samuel J. Tilden, the governor of New York state. Tilden was a formidable adversary and, like Hayes, he had a reputation for honesty. Also, like Hayes, Tilden was a hard-money man and supported civil service reform. In accordance with the custom of the time, the campaign was conducted by surrogates, with Hayes and Tilden remaining in their respective home towns.

The poor economic conditions following the Panic of 1873, combined with various Republican scandals, made the party in power unpopular, and Hayes personally believed that he might lose the election. Both candidates focused their attention on the swing states of New York and Indiana, as well as the three Southern states—Louisiana, South Carolina, and Florida—where Reconstruction governments still barely ruled amid recurring political violence. The Republicans emphasized the danger of letting Democrats run the nation so soon after the Civil War, which they claimed had been provoked by southern Democrats. To a lesser extent, they also campaigned on the danger a Democratic administration would pose to the recently won civil rights of Southern blacks. Democrats, for their part, trumpeted Tilden's record of reform and contrasted it with the corruption of the incumbent Grant administration. The election was marred by violence in the South, as Redeemers sought to suppress the black vote.

=== Post-election dispute ===
As the returns were tallied on election day, it was clear that the race was close: while Hayes had won much of the North, Tilden had carried most of the South, as well as New York, Indiana, Connecticut, and New Jersey. On November 11, three days after election day, the 19 electoral votes of Florida, Louisiana, and South Carolina were still in doubt. Tilden had won states with a collective total of 184 electoral votes, one short of a majority, while Hayes had won states with 166 electoral votes. Republicans and Democrats each claimed victory in the three disputed states, but the results in those states were rendered uncertain because of fraud by both parties. To further complicate matters, one of the three electors from Oregon (a state Hayes had won) was disqualified, reducing Hayes's total to 165, and raising the disputed votes to 20. (Note: The elector, John W. Watts, was disqualified because he held "an Office of Trust or Profit under the United States", in violation of Article II, section 1, clause 2 of the U.S. Constitution.) If Tilden was awarded just one of the disputed electoral votes, he would become president, while a Hayes victory would require him to win all twenty of the disputed votes. With no clear victor in the election, the possibility of mass disorder hung over a country that remained deeply divided in the aftermath of the Civil War.

Results of the 1876 election, with states won by Hayes in red, and those won by Tilden in blue

There was considerable debate about which person or house of Congress was authorized to decide between the competing slates of electors, with the Republican Senate and the Democratic House each claiming priority. By January 1877, with the question still unresolved, Congress and President Grant agreed to submit the matter to a bipartisan Electoral Commission, which would be authorized to determine the fate of the disputed electoral votes. The Commission was to be made up of five representatives, five senators, and five Supreme Court justices. To ensure partisan balance, there would be seven Democrats and seven Republicans, with Justice David Davis, an independent respected by both parties, as the fifteenth member. The balance was upset when Democrats in the Illinois legislature elected Davis to the Senate, hoping to sway his vote; Davis disappointed Democrats by subsequently refusing to serve on the Electoral Commission As all of the remaining Justices were Republicans, Justice Joseph P. Bradley, believed to be the most independent-minded of them, was selected to take Davis's place on the Commission. The Commission met in February and the eight Republicans voted to award all 20 electoral votes to Hayes.

Despite the Commission's holding, Democrats could still block certification of the election by refusing to convene the House. As the March 4 inauguration day neared, Republican and Democratic Congressional leaders met at Wormley's Hotel in Washington and negotiated a compromise settlement. Republicans promised concessions in exchange for Democratic acquiescence in the Committee's decision. The primary concessions Hayes promised were the withdrawal of federal troops from the South and an acceptance of the election of Democratic governments in the remaining "unredeemed" states of the South. Democrats accepted the compromise, and Hayes was certified as the winner of the election on March 2.

== Inauguration ==
Because March 4, 1877 fell on a Sunday, Hayes took the oath of office privately on Saturday, March 3, in the Red Room of the White House, becoming the first president to do so in the Executive Mansion. He took the oath publicly on the following Monday on the East Portico of the United States Capitol. In his inaugural address, Hayes attempted to soothe the passions of the past few months, saying that "he serves his party best who serves his country best". He pledged to support "wise, honest, and peaceful local self-government" in the South, as well as reform of the civil service and a full return to the gold standard. Despite his message of conciliation, many Democrats never considered Hayes's election legitimate and referred to him as "Rutherfraud" or "His Fraudulency" for the next four years.

== Administration ==
=== Cabinet ===
Hayes cabinet
Office	Name	Term
President	Rutherford B. Hayes	1877–1881
Vice President	William A. Wheeler	1877–1881
Secretary of State	William M. Evarts	1877–1881
Secretary of the Treasury	John Sherman	1877–1881
Secretary of War	George W. McCrary	1877–1879
Alexander Ramsey	1879–1881
Attorney General	Charles Devens	1877–1881
Postmaster General	David M. Key	1877–1880
Horace Maynard	1880–1881
Secretary of the Navy	Richard W. Thompson	1877–1880
Nathan Goff Jr.	1881
Secretary of the Interior	Carl Schurz	1877–1881

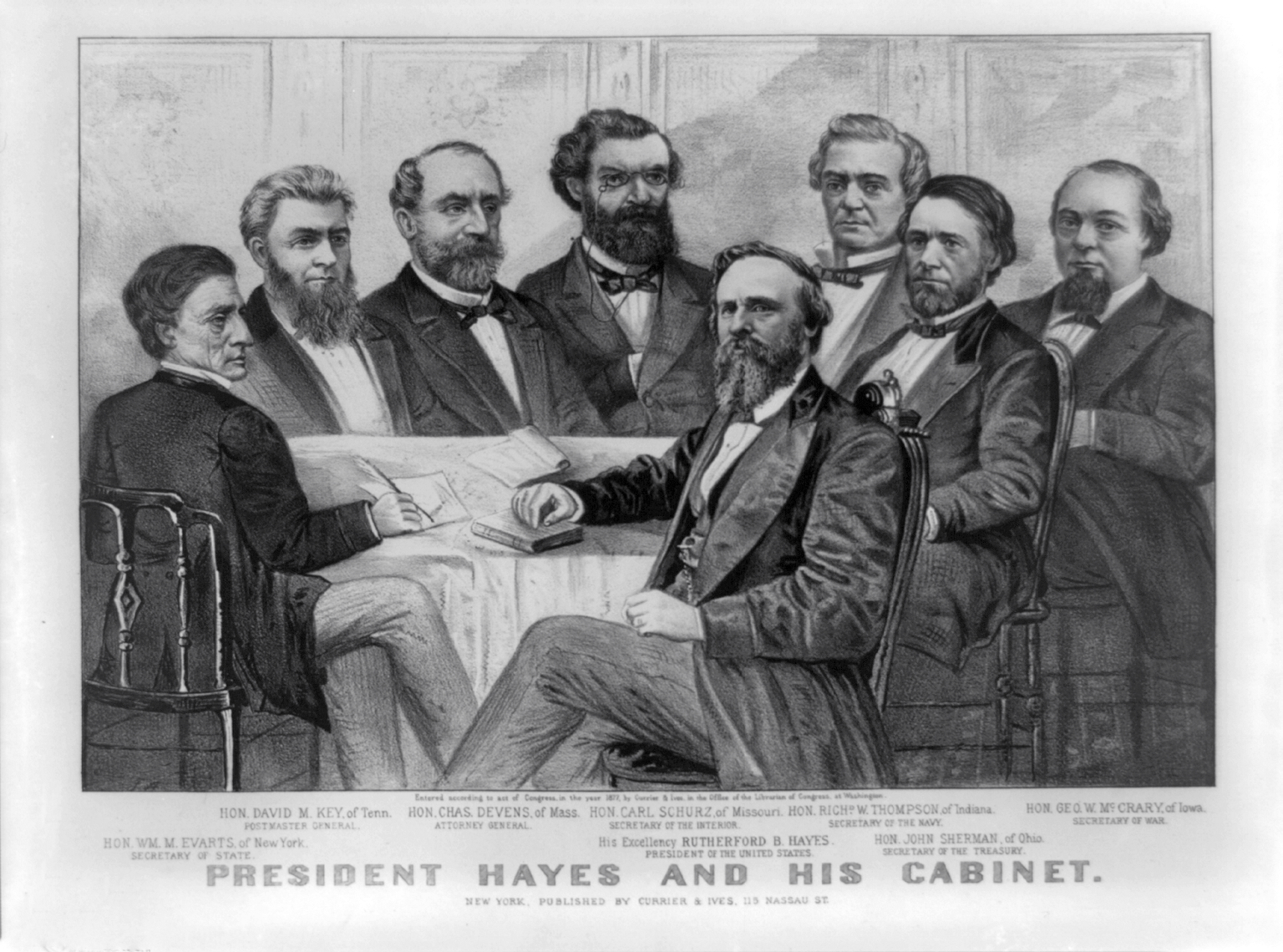
Hayes's cabinet in 1877

In choosing the members of his cabinet, Hayes spurned Radical Republicans in favor of moderates, and also disregarded anyone whom he considered a potential presidential contender. He chose William M. Evarts, who had defended President Andrew Johnson against impeachment, as Secretary of State. George W. McCrary, who had helped establish the Electoral Commission of 1877, became Secretary of War. Carl Schurz, who had supported the Liberal Republican ticket in 1872, was selected as Secretary of the Interior. In an effort to reach out to Southern moderates, Hayes selected David M. Key, a former Confederate soldier, to serve as Postmaster General. Senator John Sherman, a close ally and currency issues expert, became Secretary of the Treasury, while Richard W. Thompson was selected as Secretary of the Navy to reward Oliver P. Morton for the latter's support at the 1876 Republican National Convention. The Schurz and Evarts nominations alienated both the Stalwart and the Half-Breed factions of the Republican Party, but Hayes's initial cabinet selections won confirmation in the Senate with the help of some Southern Senators.

=== Lemonade Lucy and the dry White House ===
Hayes and his wife Lucy were known for their policy of keeping an alcohol-free White House, giving rise to her nickname "Lemonade Lucy." The first reception at the Hayes White House included wine, but Hayes was dismayed at drunken behavior at receptions hosted by ambassadors around Washington. After the first reception, alcohol was not served again in the Hayes White House. Critics charged Hayes with parsimony, but Hayes spent more money (which came out of his personal budget) after the ban, ordering that any savings from eliminating alcohol be used on more lavish entertainment. His temperance policy also paid political dividends, strengthening his support among Protestant ministers. Although Secretary Evarts quipped that at the White House dinners, "water flowed like wine," the policy was a success in convincing prohibitionists to vote Republican.

== Judicial appointments ==
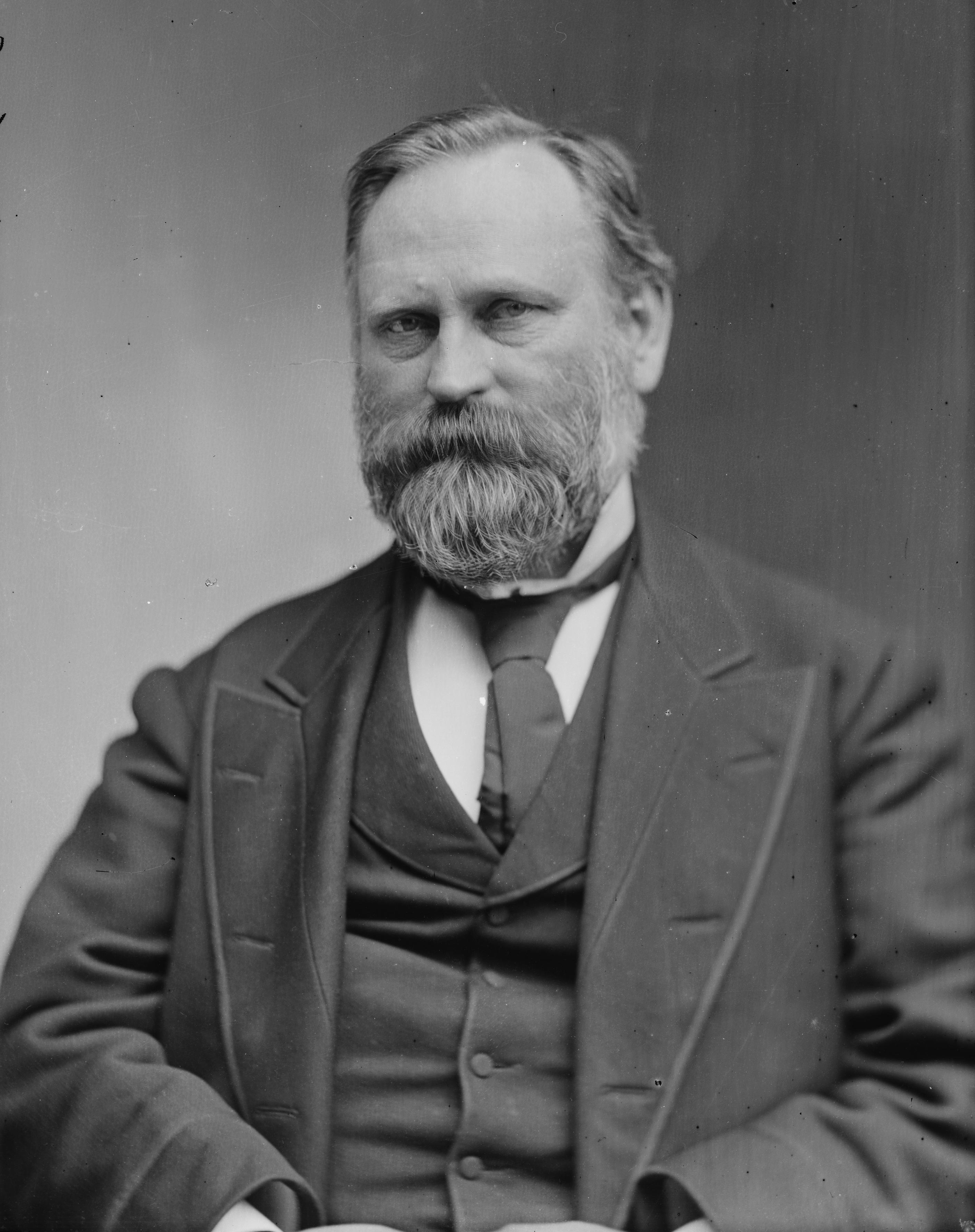
Stanley Matthews's confirmation to the Supreme Court was more difficult than Hayes expected.

Hayes appointed two associate justices to the Supreme Court. The first Supreme Court vacancy arose after David Davis resigned during the election controversy of 1876. On taking office, Hayes filled the vacancy caused by Davis's resignation by appointing John Marshall Harlan, a close ally of Benjamin Bristow. Hayes submitted the nomination in October 1877, but the nomination aroused some dissent in the Senate because of Harlan's limited experience in public office. Harlan was nonetheless confirmed and served on the court for thirty-four years, in which he voted (usually in the minority) for an aggressive enforcement of civil rights laws. In 1880, a second seat became vacant upon the resignation of Justice William Strong. Hayes nominated William Burnham Woods, a carpetbagger Republican circuit court judge from Alabama. Woods served six years on the Court, ultimately proving a disappointment to Hayes as he interpreted the Constitution in a manner more similar to that of Southern Democrats than to Hayes's own preferences.

Hayes attempted, unsuccessfully, to fill a third vacancy in 1881. Justice Noah Haynes Swayne resigned with the expectation that Hayes would fill his seat by appointing Stanley Matthews, who was a friend of both men. Many Senators objected to the appointment, believing that Matthews was too close to corporate and railroad interests, especially those of Jay Gould. The Senate adjourned without voting on the nomination, but newly elected President James A. Garfield re-submitted Matthews's nomination to the Senate, and Matthews was confirmed by a one-vote margin. Matthews served for eight years until his death in 1889. His opinion in Yick Wo v. Hopkins in 1886 advanced his and Hayes' views on the protection of ethnic minorities' rights.

In addition to his Supreme Court appointments, Hayes appointed four judges to the United States circuit courts and sixteen judges to the United States district courts.

== Political balance ==
Power in national politics was now very closely balanced, as shown for example in the close popular vote totals in the presidential election of 1876, and even more dramatically in the quiet election of 1880 were each party carry 19 states, and the Republican won 48.3 percent of the popular vote versus 48.2 percent for the loser. The new Senate in 1877 contained 39 Republicans 36 Democrats and one independent. Meanwhile, the Democrats controlled the house by the slim margin of 153 to 140. Ohio, a closely balanced state, was famed for producing national leaders – such as Hayes, Garfield, John Sherman, and William McKinley on the Republican side. They had a knack for negotiation and compromise. There were very few troublemakers or demagogues on either side both parties saw the need to compromise and relax political tensions. The economy had now recovered from the harsh depression that ended in 1873, and the nation welcomed economic expansion, farm prosperity, and the entrepreneurship that was building great industries such as iron and steel and petroleum. Historian Richard White most recently has emphasized the "Quest for Prosperity" that characterized the Gilded Age after Reconstruction ended.

== End of Reconstruction ==
=== Withdrawal from the South ===
When Hayes assumed office, only two Republican state governments remained, in South Carolina and Louisiana. They were both propped up by federal troops. Hayes had been a firm supporter of Republican Reconstruction policies throughout his political career, but the first major act of his presidency was to end Reconstruction and return the South to "home rule." In South Carolina, Hayes withdrew federal soldiers on April 10, 1877, after Governor Wade Hampton III promised to respect the civil rights of African Americans. In Louisiana, Hayes appointed a commission to mediate between the rival governments of Republican Stephen B. Packard and Democrat Francis T. Nicholls. The commission chose to support Nicholls's government, and Hayes ended Reconstruction in Louisiana, and the country as a whole, on April 29, 1877.

Some Republicans, such as Blaine, strongly criticized the end of Reconstruction. However, even without the conditions of the disputed 1876 election, Hayes would have been hard-pressed to continue the policies of his predecessors. The House of Representatives in the 45th Congress was controlled by the Democratic Party, and the Democrats refused to appropriate enough funds for the army to continue to garrison the South. Even among Republicans, devotion to continued military Reconstruction was fading in the face of persistent Southern insurgency and violence.

Of the new dawn in the country's history (the end of Reconstruction and the real new beginning) Benjamin Perley wrote of the Hayes administration:

President Hayes tried conciliation. Never did a President enter upon his duties with more sincere good-will for every section. There was displayed in every act of the incoming Administration a kindliness toward Southern men and Southern interests that almost aroused a jealousy in the North. It was not an affectation on the part of the President, but a true and honest sentiment. The good-will experiment was not quickly made. It took a long time to determine results, and even after the uncompromising spirit of the Southern Democrats had become apparent President Hayes was slow to pronounce the plan a failure. It had seemed to him the only hope of making the South peaceful and prosperous, and he had determined to give it a full trial.

=== Voting Rights ===
Democrats consolidated their control in the South in the 1878 mid-term elections, creating a voting bloc known as the Solid South. Just three of the 73 Representatives elected by the former Confederate states were members of the Republican Party. Democrats also took control of the Senate in the 1878 elections, and the new Democratic Congress immediately sought to strip away the remaining federal influence in the South.

The Democratic Congress passed an army appropriations bill in 1879 with a rider that repealed the Enforcement Acts, which had been used to suppress the Ku Klux Klan. Those acts, passed during Reconstruction, made it a crime to prevent someone from voting because of his race. Hayes was determined to preserve the law protecting black voters, and he vetoed the appropriation. The Democrats did not have enough votes to override the veto, but they passed a new bill with the same rider. Hayes vetoed this as well, and the process was repeated three times more. Finally, Hayes signed an appropriation without the offensive rider. Congress refused to pass another bill to fund federal marshals, who were vital to the enforcement of the Enforcement Acts. The election laws remained in effect, though the funds to enforce them were curtailed. Hayes's strong stance against the Democratic attempts to repeal the election laws earned him the support of civil rights advocates in the North and boosted his popularity among some Republicans who had been alienated by his civil service reform efforts.

Hayes tried to reconcile the social mores of the South with the civil rights laws by distributing patronage among Southern Democrats. "My task was to wipe out the color line, to abolish sectionalism, to end the war and bring peace," he wrote in his diary. "To do this, I was ready to resort to unusual measures and to risk my own standing and reputation within my party and the country." He also sought to build up a strong Republican Party in the South that appealed to both whites and blacks. All of his efforts were in vain; Hayes failed to convince the South to accept the idea of racial equality and failed to convince Congress to appropriate funds to enforce the civil rights laws. In the ensuing years and decades, African Americans would be almost completely disenfranchised.

== Other domestic affairs ==
=== Civil service reform ===
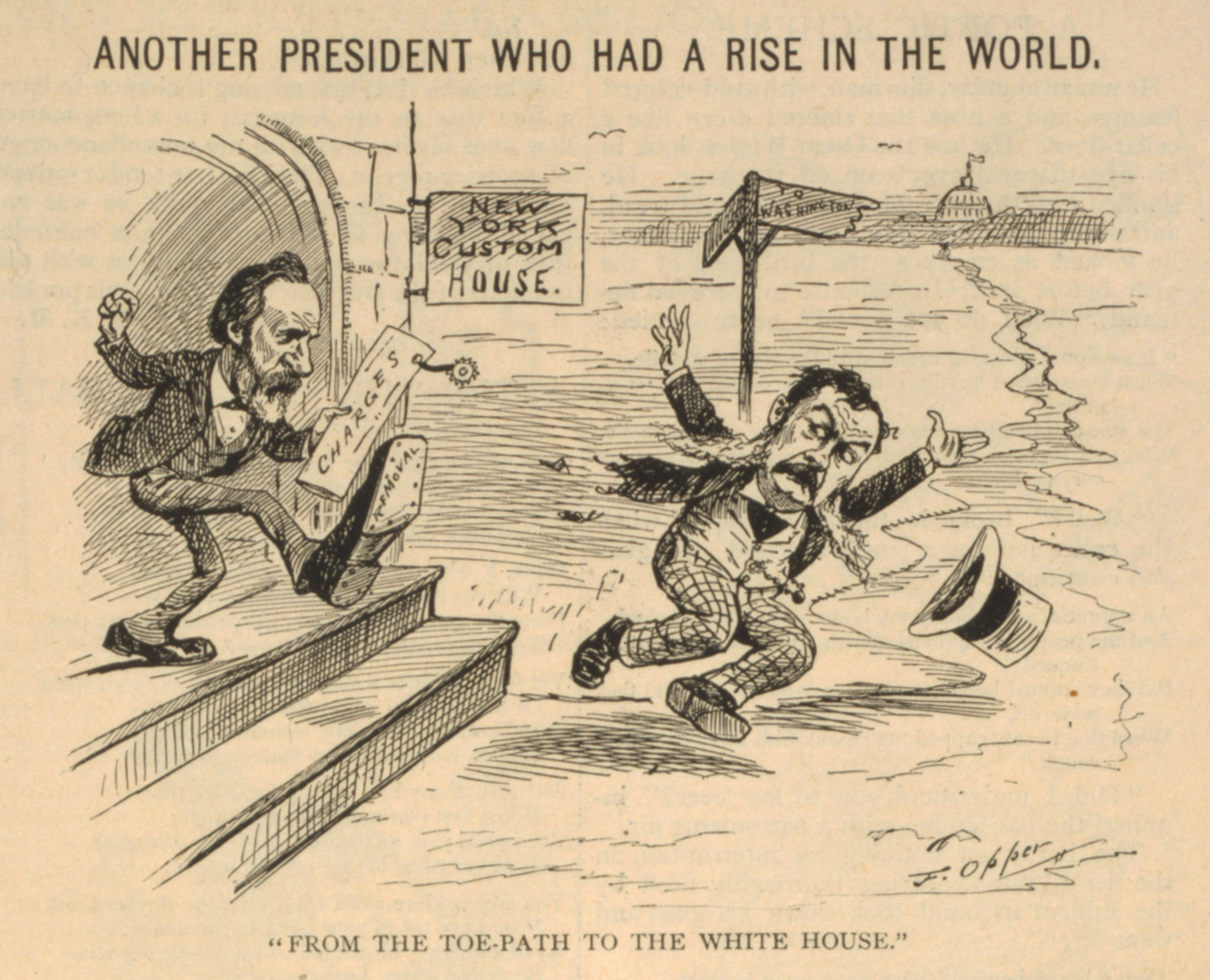
Hayes kicking Chester A. Arthur out of the New York Custom House. Editorial cartoon by Frederick Burr Opper.

After ending Reconstruction, Hayes turned to the issue of civil service reform. Instead of giving federal jobs to political supporters or the favorites of powerful members of Congress, Hayes favored appointment based on performance in civil service examinations. To show his commitment to reform, Hayes asked Secretary of the Interior Schurz and Secretary of State Evarts to lead a special cabinet committee charged with drawing up new rules for federal appointments. Senators of both parties who were accustomed to being consulted about political appointments turned against Hayes. Hayes's efforts for reform brought him into conflict with the Stalwart, or pro-spoils, branch of the Republican party, led by Senator Roscoe Conkling of New York. Treasury Secretary Sherman ordered John Jay to investigate the New York Custom House, which was stacked with Conkling's spoilsmen. Jay's report suggested that the New York Custom House was overstaffed with political appointees and that 20 percent of the employees were expendable.

With Congress unwilling to take action on civil service reform, Hayes issued an executive order that forbade federal office holders from being required to make campaign contributions or otherwise taking part in party politics. Chester A. Arthur, the Collector of the Port of New York, and his subordinates Alonzo B. Cornell and George H. Sharpe, all Conkling supporters, refused to obey the president's order. In September 1877, Hayes demanded the three men's resignations, which they refused to give. He submitted appointments of Theodore Roosevelt Sr., L. Bradford Prince, and Edwin Merritt—all supporters of Secretary of State Evarts, Conkling's New York rival—to the Senate for confirmation as their replacements. The Senate Commerce Committee, which Conkling chaired, voted unanimously to reject the nominees, and the full Senate rejected Roosevelt and Prince by a vote of 31–25, confirming Merritt only because Sharpe's term had expired. Hayes was forced to wait until July 1878 when, during a Congressional recess, he sacked Arthur and Cornell and replaced them with recess appointments of Merritt and Silas W. Burt, respectively. (Note: Charles K. Graham filled Merritt's former position.) Conkling opposed the appointees' confirmation when the Senate reconvened in February 1879, but Merritt was approved by a vote of 31–25, as was Burt by a 31–19 vote, giving Hayes his most significant civil service reform victory.

For the remainder of his term, Hayes pressed Congress to enact permanent reform legislation and fund the United States Civil Service Commission, even using his last annual message to Congress in 1880 to appeal for reform. While reform legislation did not pass during Hayes's presidency, his advocacy provided the "political impetus" for the 1883 passage of the Pendleton Civil Service Reform Act. Hayes allowed some exceptions to the ban on assessments, permitting George Congdon Gorham, secretary of the Republican Congressional Committee, to solicit campaign contributions from federal office-holders during the Congressional elections of 1878. In 1880, Hayes quickly forced Secretary of Navy Richard W. Thompson to resign office after Thompson had accepted a $25,000 salary for a nominal job offered by French engineer Ferdinand de Lesseps to promote a French canal in Panama.

Hayes also dealt with corruption in the postal service. In 1880, Schurz and Senator John A. Logan asked Hayes to shut down the "star route" rings, a system of corrupt contract profiteering in the Postal Service, and to fire Second Assistant Postmaster-General Thomas J. Brady, the alleged ring leader. Hayes stopped granting new star route contracts, but let existing contracts continue to be enforced. Democrats accused Hayes of delaying proper investigation so as not to injure Republican chances in the 1880 elections but did not press the issue in their campaign literature, as members of both parties were implicated in the corruption. Historian Hans L. Trefousse writes that the president "hardly knew the chief suspect [Brady] and certainly had no connection with the [star route] corruption." Although Hayes and the Congress both investigated the contracts and found no compelling evidence of wrongdoing, Brady and others were indicted for conspiracy in 1882. After two trials, the defendants were found not guilty in 1883.

=== 1877 railroad strike ===
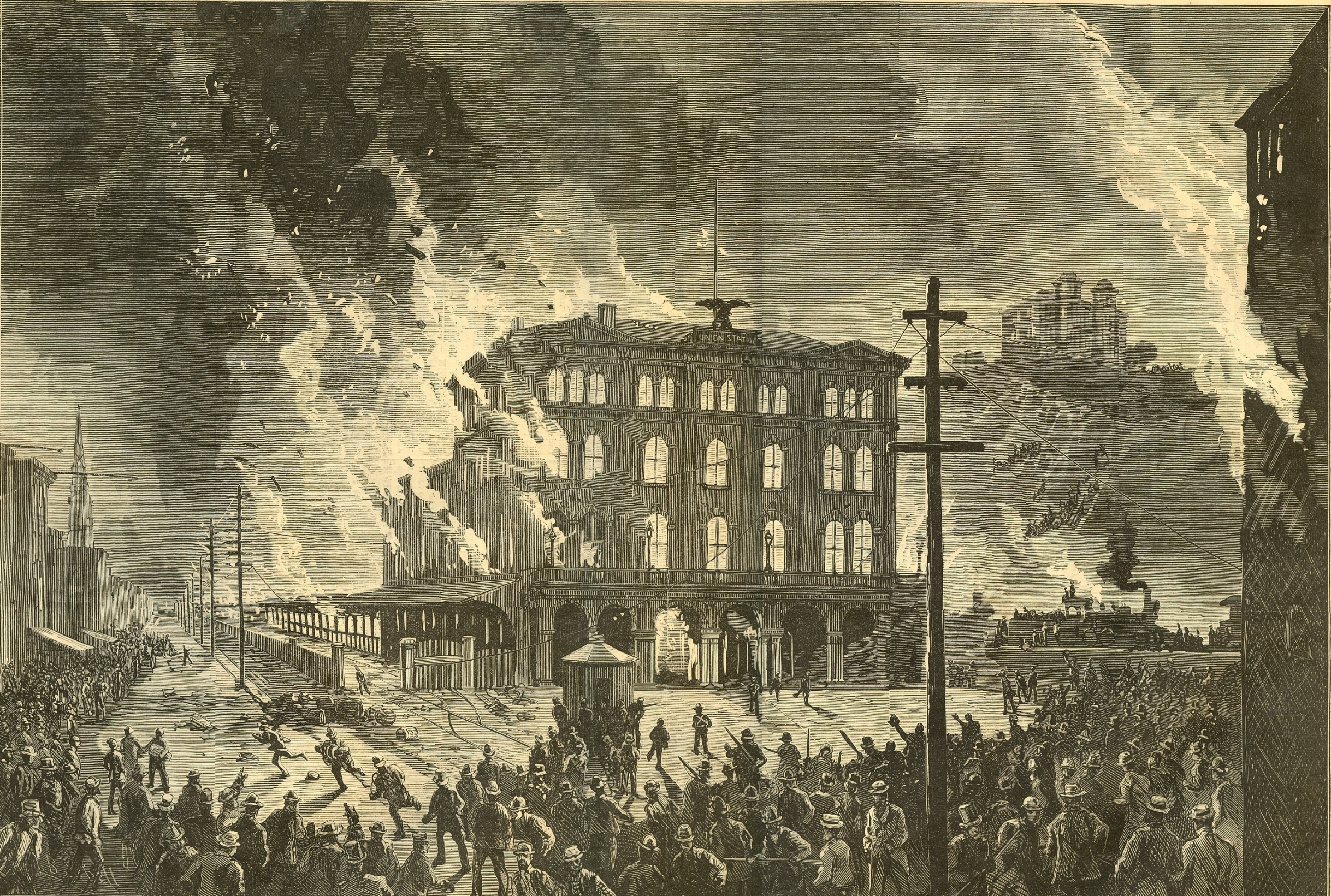
Burning of Union Depot, Pittsburgh, Pennsylvania, July 21–22, 1877

In his first year in office, Hayes was faced with the Great Railroad Strike of 1877, the largest labor disturbance up to that point in U.S. history. In order to make up for financial losses suffered since the Panic of 1873, the major railroads had cut their employees' wages several times. The Pennsylvania Railroad, one of the largest railroads, reduced the average worker's pay by approximately 25% between 1873 and 1877, and the railroad also imposed longer hours and stricter managerial control. In July 1877, workers from the Baltimore & Ohio Railroad walked off the job in Martinsburg, West Virginia, to protest their reduction in pay. The strike quickly spread to workers of the New York Central, Erie, and Pennsylvania railroads, with the strikers soon numbering in the thousands. In many communities, friends and family members of the railroad workers also became involved in the strike, and strike leaders struggled to control crowds. Fearing a riot, Governor Henry M. Mathews asked Hayes to send federal troops to Martinsburg, and Hayes did so, but when the troops arrived there was no riot, only a peaceful protest. In Baltimore, however, a riot did erupt on July 20 and Hayes ordered the troops at Fort McHenry to assist the governor in its suppression.

Pittsburgh next exploded into riots, but Hayes was reluctant to send in troops without the governor first requesting them. Other discontented citizens joined the railroad workers in rioting. After a few days, Hayes resolved to send in troops to protect federal property wherever it appeared to be threatened and gave Major General Winfield Scott Hancock overall command of the situation. The riot spread to Chicago and St. Louis, where the Workingmen's Party organized a brief general strike. As the rioting spread, some began to fear a nationwide radical revolution inspired by the Paris Commune. This fear did not come to pass, as by the end of July 1877, state, local, and federal authorities had brought the labor disturbances to an end. Although no federal troops had killed any of the strikers, or been killed themselves, clashes between state militia troops and strikers resulted in deaths on both sides.

The railroads were victorious in the short term, as the workers returned to their jobs and some wage cuts remained in effect. But the public blamed the railroads for the strikes and violence, and the railroads were compelled to improve working conditions and make no further cuts. Business leaders praised Hayes, but his own opinion was more equivocal; as he recorded in his diary: "The strikes have been put down by force; but now for the real remedy. Can't something [be] done by education of strikers, by judicious control of capitalists, by wise general policy to end or diminish the evil? The railroad strikers, as a rule, are good men, sober, intelligent, and industrious." Hayes was the first president to deploy the U.S. Army to intervene in a labor dispute in the states. (Note: The U.S. Army had previously been deployed to intervene in labor disputes in the territories.) In response to the strike and the deployment of federal soldiers, Congress passed the Posse Comitatus Act, which limits the use of military personnel in resolving domestic disturbances.

=== Women's Rights ===
The suffragette movement had been growing for many years prior to the presidency of Hayes. Although the issue of suffrage would not be resolved during the Hayes's tenure, another, albeit smaller issue would be. Prior to Hayes' ascension, a Belva Lockwood had attempted to be admitted to the supreme court bar. She had been rejected, not on grounds of merit or qualification, but due to her sex. She appealed to members of congress for legislation that, if enacted, would remove this type of barrier and allow for qualified women to submit and argue cases before the Supreme Court. After much debate, in 1879, congress passed, and Hayes signed into law the Act to Relieve Certain Legal Disabilities of Women, popularly known as the Lockwood Bill. Lockwood would go on to argue a number of cases in front of the court, and win one in 1906.

=== Indian policy ===
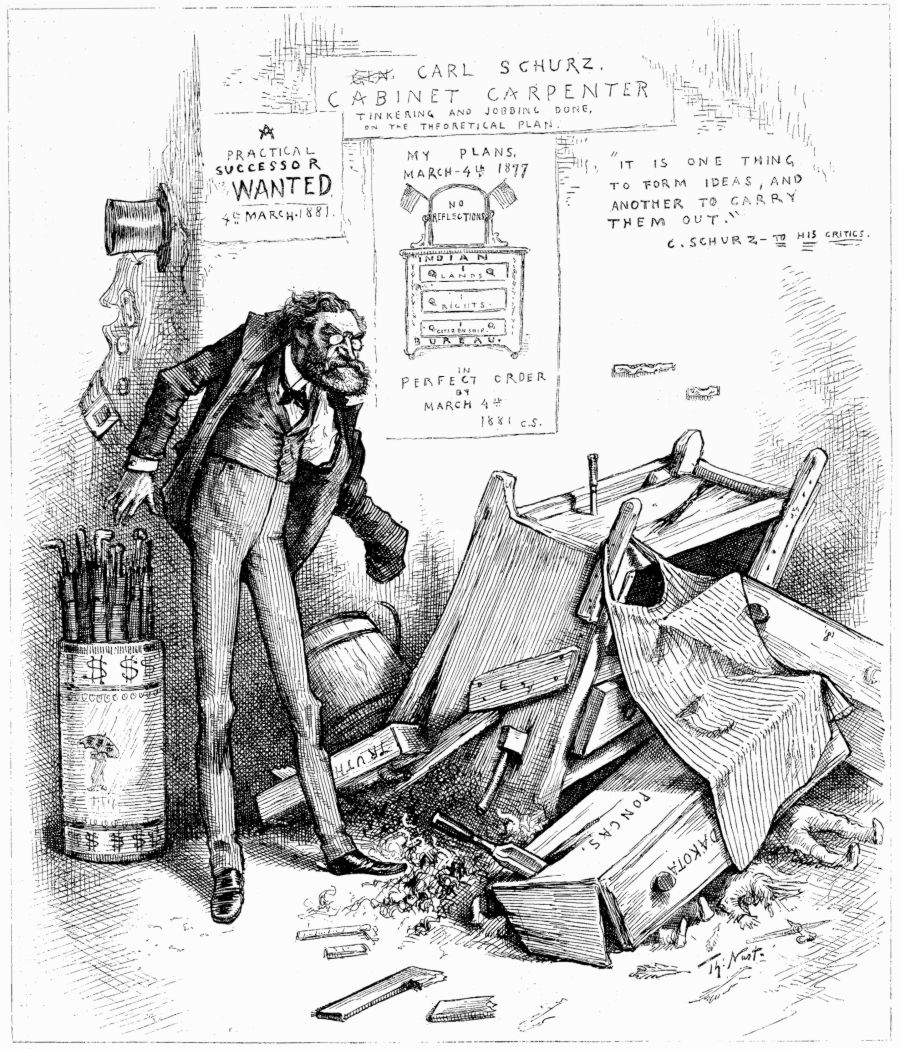
An 1881 political cartoon about Carl Schurz's management of the Indian Bureau

Interior Secretary Schurz carried out Hayes's American Indian policy, beginning with preventing the War Department from taking over the Bureau of Indian Affairs. Hayes and Schurz carried out a policy that included assimilation into white culture, educational training, and dividing Indian land into individual household allotments. Hayes believed that his policies would lead to self-sufficiency and peace between Indians and whites. The allotment system was favored by liberal reformers at the time, including Schurz, but instead proved detrimental to American Indians. They lost much of their land through later sales to unscrupulous white speculators. Hayes and Schurz reformed the Bureau of Indian Affairs to reduce fraud and gave Indians responsibility for policing their understaffed reservations.

Hayes dealt with several conflicts with Indian tribes. The Nez Perce, led by Chief Joseph, began an uprising in June 1877 when Major General Oliver O. Howard ordered them to move on to a reservation. Howard's men defeated the Nez Perce in battle, and the tribe began a 1700-mile retreat into Canada. In October, after a decisive battle at Bear Paw, Montana, Chief Joseph surrendered and General William T. Sherman ordered the tribe transported to Kansas, where they were forced to remain until 1885. The Nez Perce war was not the last conflict in the West, as the Bannock rose up in Spring 1878 and raided nearby settlements before being defeated by Howard's army in July of that year. War with the Ute tribe broke out in 1879 when the Utes killed Indian agent Nathan Meeker, who had been attempting to convert them to Christianity. The subsequent White River War ended when Schurz negotiated peace with the Utes and prevented the white Coloradans from taking revenge for Meeker's death.

Hayes also became involved in resolving the removal of the Ponca tribe from Nebraska to Indian Territory (present-day Oklahoma) because of a misunderstanding during the Grant Administration. The tribe's problems came to Hayes's attention after their chief, Standing Bear, filed a lawsuit to contest Schurz's demand that they stay in Indian Territory. Overruling Schurz, Hayes set up a commission in 1880 that ruled Ponca were free to return to Nebraska or stay on their reservation in Indian Territory. The Ponca were awarded compensation for their land rights, which had been previously granted to the Sioux. In a message to Congress in February 1881, Hayes insisted he would "give to these injured people that measure of redress which is required alike by justice and by humanity."

== Finance and economics ==
=== Currency debate ===
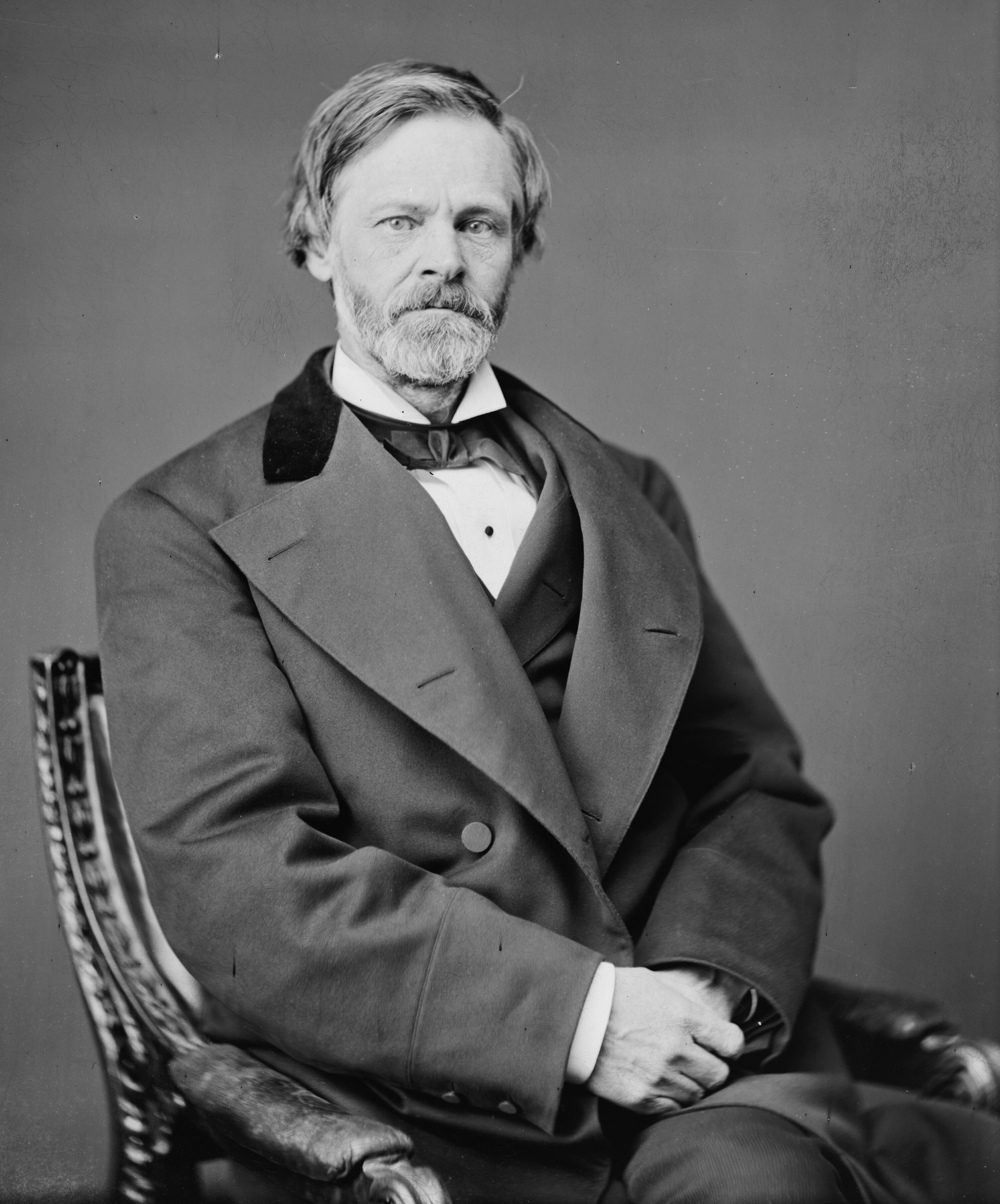
Treasury Secretary John Sherman worked with Hayes to return the country to the gold standard.

The Coinage Act of 1873 had stopped the coinage of silver for all coins worth a dollar or more, effectively tying the dollar to the value of gold. As a result, the money supply contracted and the effects of the Panic of 1873 grew worse, making it more expensive for debtors to pay debts they had contracted when currency was less valuable. Farmers and laborers, especially, clamored for the return of coinage in both metals, believing the increased money supply would restore wages and property values. Democratic Representative Richard P. Bland of Missouri proposed a bill that would require the United States to coin as much silver as miners could sell to the government, thus increasing the money supply and aiding debtors. William B. Allison, a Republican from Iowa offered an amendment in the Senate limiting the coinage to two to four million dollars per month, and the resulting Bland–Allison Act passed both houses of Congress in 1878.

Hayes feared that the Bland–Allison Act would cause inflation that would be ruinous to business, effectively impairing contracts that were based on the gold dollar, as the silver dollar proposed in the bill would have an intrinsic value of 90 to 92 percent of the existing gold dollar. Further, Hayes believed that inflating the currency was an act of dishonesty, saying "[e]xpediency and justice both demand an honest currency." He vetoed the bill, but Congress overrode his veto, the only time it did so during his presidency. As the Bland–Allison Act gave the president discretion in determining the number of silver coins minted, Hayes limited the effect of the act by authorizing the coining of only a relatively small number of silver coins.

During the Civil War, the federal government had issued United States Notes (commonly called greenbacks), a form of fiat currency. The government accepted these notes as valid for payment of taxes and tariffs, but unlike ordinary dollars, they were not redeemable in gold. The Specie Payment Resumption Act of 1875 required the treasury to redeem any outstanding greenbacks in gold, thus retiring them from circulation and restoring the gold standard. Hayes and Secretary of the Treasury Sherman both supported a restoration of the gold standard, and the Hayes administration stockpiled gold in preparation for the exchange of greenbacks for gold. Once the public was confident that they could redeem greenbacks for specie (gold), however, few did so; when the act took effect in 1879, only $130,000 out of the $346,000,000 outstanding dollars in greenbacks were actually redeemed. Together with the Bland–Allison Act, the successful specie resumption effected a workable compromise between inflationists and hard money men. As the world economy began to improve, agitation for more greenbacks and silver coinage quieted down for the rest of Hayes's term in office.

=== Pensions and tariffs ===
In 1861, Congress had significantly raised tariffs with the passage of the Morrill Tariff, which funded the Civil War and also protected American industries like iron and steel. The high rates of the Morrill Tariff remained in effect in the 1870s, leading to a federal budgetary surplus. Though the tariff was politically popular in the industrialized Northeast, it had many detractors in the South and Midwest, as high tariff rates led to higher prices. Seeking to shore up the tariff's popularity, Senator Henry W. Blair proposed the Arrears Act, which Hayes signed in 1879. The Arrears Act expanded the pension system designed to benefit Union Civil War veterans by making pension payments retroactive to a soldier's discharge or death rather than the date of their application. In practice, this meant sending large checks to veterans and their families, and pension disbursements doubled between 1879 and 1881. The act proved extremely popular outside of the South and spread support for Republicans and high tariff rates.

== Foreign affairs ==
=== Panamanian Canal ===
the United States ( Columbia) rejects De Lesseps plan for a French-owned Panama Canal. By Thomas Nast, April 10, 1880, Harper's Weekly

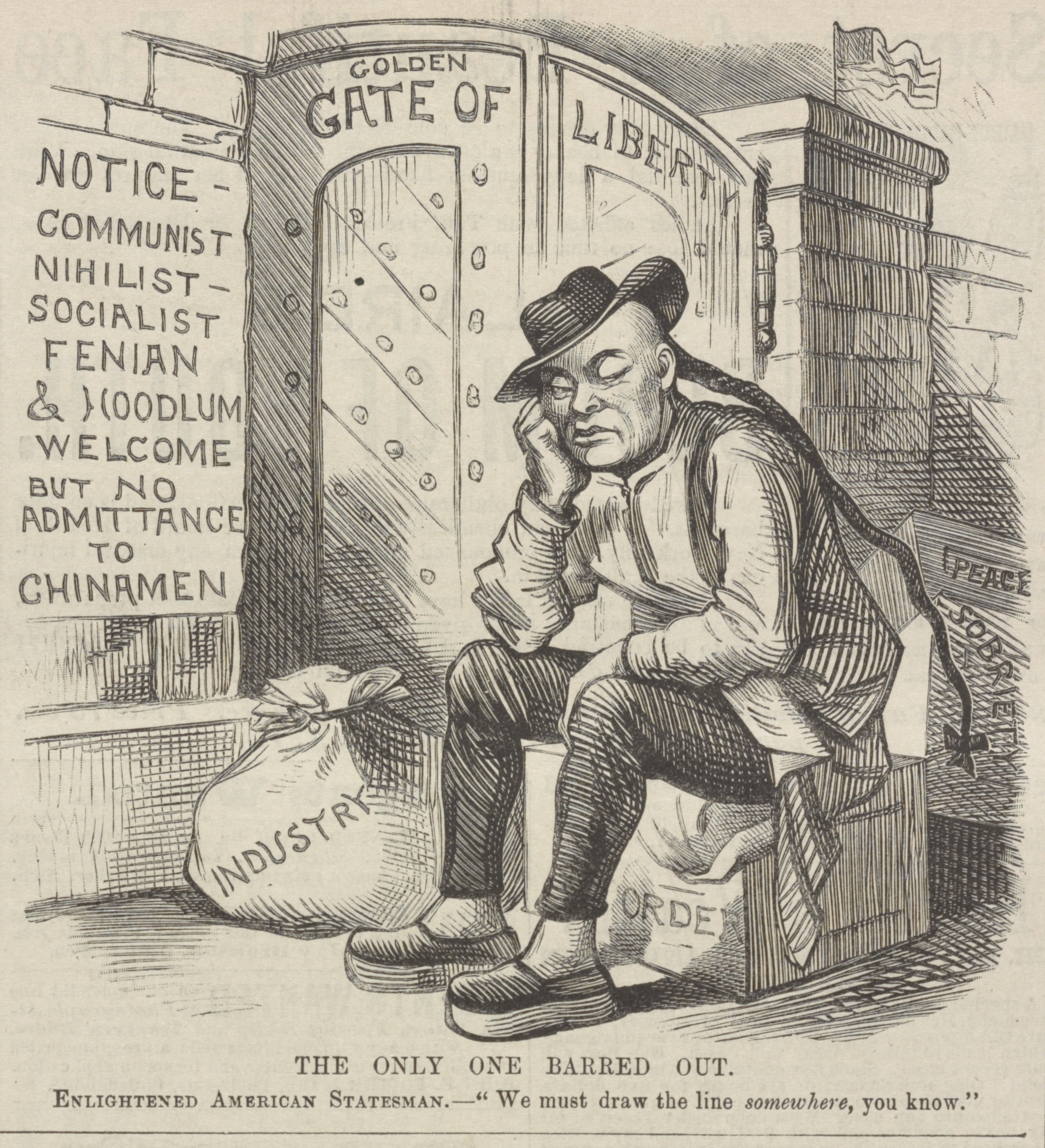
A political cartoon from 1882, criticizing Chinese exclusion

Hayes was perturbed over the plans of Ferdinand de Lesseps, the builder of the Suez Canal, to construct a canal across the Isthmus of Panama, which was then owned by Colombia. Concerned about a repetition of French adventurism in Mexico, Hayes interpreted the Monroe Doctrine firmly. In a message to Congress, Hayes explained his opinion on the canal: "The policy of this country is a canal under American control ... The United States cannot consent to the surrender of this control to any European power or any combination of European powers." De Lesseps went ahead anyway, raised very large sums, and began construction. Disease ravaged his workforce, and his project collapsed in corruption and incompetence.

=== Mexico ===
Throughout the 1870s, "lawless bands" often crossed the Mexican border on raids into Texas. Three months after taking office, Hayes granted the Army the power to pursue bandits, even if it required crossing into Mexican territory. Porfirio Díaz, the Mexican president, protested the order and sent troops to the border. The situation calmed as Díaz and Hayes agreed to jointly pursue bandits and Hayes agreed not to allow Mexican revolutionaries to raise armies in the United States. The violence along the border decreased, and in 1880 Hayes revoked the order allowing pursuit into Mexico.

=== Chinese immigration ===
The Hayes administration gave significant attention to U.S.–China relations as Chinese immigration now became a contentious issue. In 1868, the Senate had ratified the Burlingame Treaty with China, allowing an unrestricted flow of Chinese immigrants into the country. As the economy soured after the Panic of 1873, Chinese immigrants were blamed for depressing workmen's wages. During the Great Railroad Strike of 1877, anti-Chinese riots broke out in San Francisco, and a new third party, the Workingman's Party, was formed in California with the goal of stopping Chinese immigration. In response, Congress passed a measure, the "Fifteen Passenger Bill" in 1879, aimed at limiting the number of Chinese passengers permitted on vessels arriving at U.S. ports. As the legislation would violate the terms of the Burlingame Treaty, Hayes, believing that the United States should not unilaterally abrogate treaties, vetoed it. The veto drew praise among eastern liberals, but Hayes was bitterly denounced in the West. In the subsequent furor, Democrats in the House of Representatives attempted to impeach him, but narrowly failed when Republicans prevented a quorum by refusing to vote. After the veto, Assistant Secretary of State Frederick W. Seward and James Burrill Angell negotiated with the Chinese to reduce the number of Chinese immigrants. The resulting accord, the Angell Treaty of 1880, allowed the U.S. to suspend Chinese immigration, which Congress did (after Hayes left office) with the Chinese Exclusion Act of 1882.

=== Other issues ===
In 1878, following the Paraguayan War, the president arbitrated a territorial dispute between Argentina and Paraguay. Hayes awarded the disputed land in the Gran Chaco region to Paraguay, and the Paraguayans honored him by renaming a city (Villa Hayes) and a department (Presidente Hayes) in his honor. The administration sought friendly relations with the major European powers, though not to the detriment of the Monroe Doctrine. Hayes upheld the Treaty of Washington, ending the dispute with Great Britain caused by the Alabama Claims. He refused the annexation request of Samoa, instead establishing a de facto tripartite protectorate with Great Britain and Germany.

== Last year in office ==
=== Western tour, 1880 ===
In 1880, Hayes embarked on a 71-day tour of the American West, becoming the first sitting president to travel west of the Rocky Mountains. Hayes' traveling party included his wife and General William Tecumseh Sherman, who helped organize the trip. Hayes began his trip in September 1880, departing from Chicago on the transcontinental railroad. He journeyed across the continent, ultimately arriving in California, stopping first in Wyoming and then Utah and Nevada, reaching Sacramento and San Francisco. By railroad and stagecoach, the party traveled north to Oregon, arriving in Portland, and from there to Vancouver, Washington. Going by steamship, they visited Seattle, and then returned to San Francisco. Hayes then toured several southwestern states before returning to Ohio in November, in time to cast a vote in the 1880 presidential election.

=== 1880 presidential election ===
Republican James Garfield defeated Democrat Winfield Scott Hancock in the 1880 election

Although some Republicans urged Hayes to run for a second term, he was looking forward to retirement, and so stuck to his 1876 promise to serve only one term. When Republicans convened in June 1880, in Chicago, the fight for the nomination stood between former President Grant and Senator James Blaine. Congressman James A. Garfield, head of the Ohio delegation and chairman of the Convention Rules Committee, backed Treasury Secretary John Sherman. Elihu B. Washburne, George F. Edmunds, and William Windom also emerged as potential nominees. The convention deadlocked through thirty-three ballots, with Grant leading, followed by Blaine and Sherman. On the thirty-fourth ballot, Garfield received sixteen votes from Wisconsin, and Blaine and Sherman backers switched their support to Garfield on subsequent ballots. On the thirty-sixth ballot, Garfield won 399 votes to Grant's 306, putting him over the top and giving him the Republican nomination. The convention nominated Chester A. Arthur, the former port collector of New York, to serve as Garfield's running mate. Hayes was pleased with the ticket, which provided a balance between Half-Breeds and Stalwarts, and he appreciated the convention's endorsement of his presidency.

The 1880 Democratic National Convention met in June and nominated General Winfield Scott Hancock. With the Democrats firmly in control of the South, a Republican victory would require strong performances in the Northern swing states of Indiana, Ohio, New Jersey, New York, and Connecticut. The Republican Party campaigned on their support for universal manhood suffrage and argued that Republican policies had led to economic prosperity. Though Hancock swept the South and won most of the Far West, Garfield won the election by dominating the Northeast and the Midwest. Garfield won an extremely narrow popular vote plurality, with a margin of less than 0.1%. James B. Weaver of the Greenback Party took over 3% of the popular vote. In the weeks following Garfield's election, Hayes and Garfield worked with each other to assure a smooth transition of power.

== Historical reputation ==
President Rutherford B. Hayes, Lucy Webb Hayes, poss Frances and Scott Hayes entertainment in their library (now the Yellow Oval Room) with Carl Schurz on piano

Historian Ari Hoogenboom argues that Hayes was a shrewd politician and a "patient reformer who attempted what was possible." Hoogenboom contends that Hayes's most serious mistake was choosing not to run for a second term, which would have allowed Hayes to more fully implement his agenda. Historian Keith Polakoff basically agrees with Hoogenboom. According to him, Hayes accepted and viewed the presidency as a personal honor, not as a challenge to introduce new policies. He worked to calm crises, including the situation around Reconstruction and the great 1877 railroad strike. Efficiency was his watchword and was the goal of the main reform he promoted, replacing patronage appointees with civil service professionals. However, still according to Polakoff, he did not work hard enough to achieve it against the forces of party patronage. He gave his cabinet wide leeway, and did not interfere or guide their major activities. Hayes often clashed with Congress to protect presidential prerogatives, but that was passive activity that led to nothing new. He did take credit for helping elect his old friend James Garfield as his successor. Kenneth Davison emphasizes how hard Hayes worked, especially through long speaking tours, to promote national unity and an end to sectional, class, and racial conflicts of the sort that had generated so much hatred and violence for the previous two decades.

Polls of historians and political scientists have generally ranked Hayes as a below-average president. A 2018 poll of the American Political Science Association’s Presidents and Executive Politics section ranked Hayes as the 28th best president. A 2017 C-SPAN poll of historians ranked Hayes as the 32nd best president.

== Bibliography ==
=== Books ===
- Barnard, Harry (2005) [1954]. Rutherford Hayes and his America. Newtown, Connecticut: American Political Biography Press. ISBN 978-0-945707-05-9.
- Bruce, Robert V. (1989) [1959]. 1877: Year of Violence. Ivan R. Dee, Publisher. ISBN 978-0-929587-05-9.
- Burgess, John William. The administration of President Hayes (1916); 155pp online free
- Davison, Kenneth E. (1972). The Presidency of Rutherford B. Hayes. Westport, CT: Greenwood Press. ISBN 978-0-8371-6275-1., A scholarly history.
- Dodds, Graham G. (2013). Take Up Your Pen: Unilateral Presidential Directives in American Politics. Philadelphia: University of Pennsylvania Press. ISBN 978-0-8122-0815-3.
- Foner, Eric (2002) [1988]. Reconstruction: America's Unfinished Revolution, 1863–1877. New York: Harper Perennial Modern Classics. ISBN 978-0-06-093716-4.
- Holt, Michael F. By One Vote: The Disputed Presidential Election of 1876 (University Press of Kansas, 2008), The standard scholarly history of the election. excerpt
- Hoogenboom, Ari (1995). Rutherford Hayes: Warrior and President. Lawrence, Kansas: University Press of Kansas. ISBN 978-0-7006-0641-2., A standard scholarly biography.
- Hoogenboom, Ari. The Presidency of Rutherford B. Hayes (University Press of Kansas, 1988), the standard scholarly history. online
- Logan, Rayford W. The Betrayal of the Negro: From Rutherford B. Hayes to Woodrow Wilson (Collier Books, 1965).
- Morris, Roy. Fraud of the century: Rutherford B. Hayes, Samuel Tilden, and the stolen election of 1876 ( New York: Simon & Schuster, 2003).
- Oberholtzer, Ellis Paxson (1926). A History of the United States Since the Civil War: Volume 3 1872–1878. New York, Macmillan. pp. 69–122.
- Oberholtzer, Ellis Paxson (1926). A History of the United States Since the Civil War: Volume 4 1878–1888. New York, Macmillan. pp. 1-45.
- Quince, Charles. Rutherford B. Hayes and the Restoration of Presidential Powers (2020).
- Rhodes, James Ford. History of the United States from the Compromise of 1850: 1877–1896 (1919) online complete; pp 1–109; old, factual and heavily political, by winner of Pulitzer Prize
- Richardson, Heather Cox (2001). The Death of Reconstruction. Cambridge, Massachusetts: Harvard University Press. ISBN 978-0-674-00637-9.
- Robinson, Lloyd (2001) [1968]. The Stolen Election: Hayes versus Tilden—1876. New York: Tom Doherty Associates. ISBN 978-0-7653-0206-9.
- Simpson, Brooks D. The Reconstruction Presidents (1998) pp 198-228 on Hayes.
- Stowell, David O. (1999). Streets, Railroads, and the Great Strike of 1877. Chicago: University Of Chicago Press. ISBN 978-0-226-77668-2.
- Trefousse, Hans L. (2002). Rutherford B. Hayes. New York: Times Books. ISBN 978-0-8050-6907-5., A standard scholarly biography.
- Unger, Irwin (2008) [1964]. The Greenback Era: A Social and Political History of American Finance, 1865–1879. New York: ACLS Humanities. ISBN 978-1-59740-431-0.
- White, Richard (2017). The Republic for Which It Stands: The United States During Reconstruction and the Gilded Age: 1865–1896. New York: Oxford University Press. ISBN 9780190619060.
- Williams, Charles Richard. Life of Rutherford Birchard Hayes (2 vol 1914); vol 1 to 1877 online; also vol 2 from 1877 online
- Woodward, C. Vann. Reunion and Reaction: The Compromise of 1877 and the End of Reconstruction (1951).

=== Unpublished PhD dissertations ===
- Connors, Austin W. "A Diplomatic Sequel to the War of the Triple Alliance (1864-1870): United States President Rutherford B. Hayes' 1878 Arbitration for Paraguay and Argentina" (Dissertation, Duke University, 2022) online.
- Houdek, John Thomas. "James A. Garfield and Rutherford B. Hayes: A Study in State and National Politics" (Michigan State University; Proquest Dissertations Publishing, 1970. 7111871).
- Matlosz, Gregory. "The Political Symbiosis of Rutherford B. Hayes & William McKinley" (Drew University; ProQuest Dissertations Publishing, 2015. 3700842).
- Ranson, Frederick Duane. "The Great Unknown: Governor Rutherford B. Hayes Of Ohio." (West Virginia University; Proquest Dissertations Publishing, 1978. 7910909).

=== Articles ===
- Bishop, Wesley R. "Rutherford B. Hayes Presidential Library and Museum." Ohio History 127.2 (2020): 126–129. online
- Calhoun, Charles W. “Reimagining the ‘Lost Men’ of the Gilded Age: Perspectives on the Late Nineteenth Century Presidents,” Journal of the Gilded Age andProgressive Era 1#3 (July 2002): 226+,
- Clendenen, Clarence (October 1969). "President Hayes' "Withdrawal of the Troops": An Enduring Myth". The South Carolina Historical Magazine. 70 (4): 240–250 [244]. JSTOR 27566958.
- De Santis, Vincent P. "President Hayes's Southern Policy." Journal of Southern History 21.4 (1955): 476–494. online
- Deacon, Kristine. "On the Road with Rutherford B. Hayes: Oregon's First Presidential Visit, 1880." Oregon Historical Quarterly 112.2 (2011): 170–193. online
- Gallagher, Douglas Steven. "The 'smallest mistake': explaining the failures of the Hayes and Harrison presidencies." White House Studies 2.4 (2002): 395–414.
- Klotsche, J. Martin (December 1935). "The Star Route Cases". The Mississippi Valley Historical Review. 22 (3): 407–418. doi:10.2307/1892626. JSTOR 1892626.
- McPherson, James M. "Coercion or conciliation? abolitionists debate President Hayes's southern policy." New England Quarterly (1966): 474–497. online
- Moore, Dorothy L. "William A. Howard and the Nomination of Rutherford B. Hayes for the Presidency." Vermont History 38#4 (1970) pp. 316–319. online
- Paul, Ezra (Winter 1998). "Congressional Relations and Public Relations in the Administration of Rutherford B. Hayes (1877–81)". Presidential Studies Quarterly. 28 (1): 68–87. JSTOR 27551831.
- Peskin, Allan. "Rutherford B. Hayes: the road to the white house." in Edward O. Frantz, ed. A Companion to the Reconstruction Presidents 1865–1881 (2014): 403–414.
- Polakoff, Keith Ian. "Rutherford B. Hayes" in Henry F. Graff. ed. The Presidents: A Reference History (3rd ed. 2002) pp 261–72 online
- Ross, Michael A. "Rutherford B. Hayes." in The Presidents and the Constitution (Volume One. New York University Press, 2020). 253–265.
- Skidmore, Max J. Maligned Presidents: The Late 19th Century (Palgrave Macmillan, 2014) pp. 50–62.
- Smith, Kelsey. "President Rutherford B. Hayes and Gilded Age Politics." The Dialogue 5.2 (2024): 5–28. online.
- Smith, Thomas A. (Fall 1980). "Before Hyde Park: The Rutherford B. Hayes Library". The American Archivist. 43 (4): 485–488.
- Sproat, John G. (1974). "Rutherford B. Hayes: 1877–1881". In C. Vann Woodward (ed.). Responses of the Presidents to Charges of Misconduct. New York: Delacorte Press. pp. 163–76. ISBN 978-0-440-05923-3.
- Stuart, Paul (September 1977). "United States Indian Policy: From the Dawes Act to the American Indian Policy Review Commission". Social Service Review. 51 (3): 451–463. doi:10.1086/643524. JSTOR 30015511.
- Swint, Henry L. (June 1952). "Rutherford B. Hayes, Educator". The Mississippi Valley Historical Review. 39 (1): 45–60. doi:10.2307/1902843. JSTOR 1902843.
- Thelen, David P. (Summer 1970). "Rutherford B. Hayes and the Reform Tradition in the Gilded Age". American Quarterly. 22 (2): 150–165. doi:10.2307/2711639. JSTOR 2711639.
- Vazzano, Frank P. "Rutherford B. Hayes and the Politics of Discord." Historian 68.3 (2006): 519–540. online
- Vazzano, Frank P. "President Hayes, Congress and the Appropriations Riders Vetoes." Congress & the Presidency: A Journal of Capital Studies 20#1 (1993).
- Wheeler, William A. "Rutherford Birchard Hayes." in African Americans and the Presidents: Politics and Policies from Washington to Trump (2019): 68–70. online
- Yeats, Dylan. "The Religious Politics of Empire in the Gilded Age: President Rutherford B. Hayes’s Tour of the West." Pacific Historical Review 92.3 (2023): 448-468.

=== Primary sources ===
- Letters and messages of Rutherford B. Hayes (1881) online
- Howells, William Dean. Sketch of the Life and Character of Rutherford B. Hayes (Hurd and Houghton, 1876). by a famous novelist; online
- Hayes, Rutherford B. (1924). Williams, Charles Richard (ed.). Diary and letters of Rutherford Birchard Hayes (4 vols.). online
- Rutherford B. Hayes Political Cartoons 5 cartoons about Hayes presidency published when he was president; not copyright
