= Salem and Pennsgrove Traction Company =

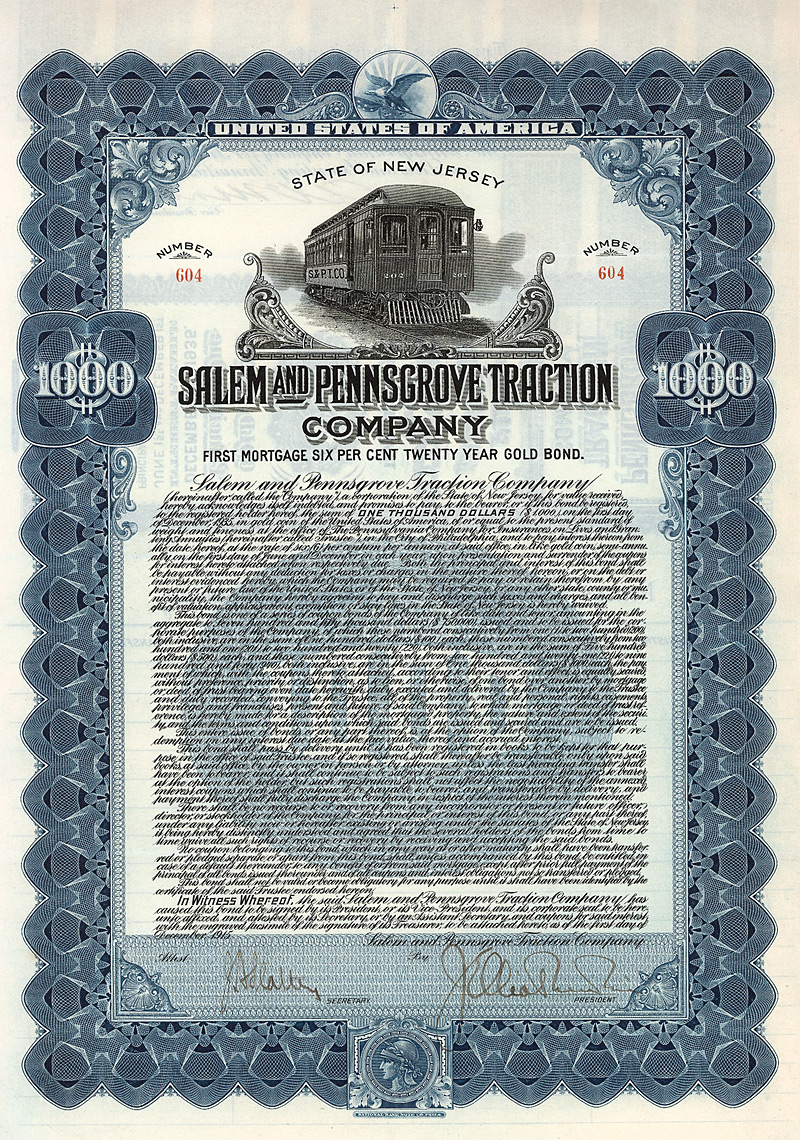
$1000 Bond from the Salem and Pennsgrove Traction Company from 1 December 1915

The Salem and Penns Grove Traction Company owned a line from Salem to Penns Grove, New Jersey, connecting the ends of two branches of the Pennsylvania Railroad (later Pennsylvania-Reading Seashore Lines). The company was chartered in 1915, and W. W. Hepburn was the first president. Streetcars were discontinued in 1933, and were replaced by buses that had run since 1930, now New Jersey Transit route 468 (Penns Grove-Salem-Woodstown).

== See also ==
- List of New Jersey street railroads
