= Millville Traction Company =

Streetcar operator in Millville, New Jersey

The Millville Traction Company operated streetcars in Millville, New Jersey, and along an interurban streetcar line to Vineland, New Jersey, along Main Road (now CR 555) and Landis Avenue.

== History ==
The company was chartered in 1894 and opened its main line on August 1, 1901. Also in 1901, the Millville Rapid Transit Company, which had been leased, was merged into the Millville Traction Company. The company ceased operations on its lines on June 15, 1922.

== See also ==
- List of New Jersey street railroads
