= Star Route scandal =

1870s postal-delivery scandal in the US

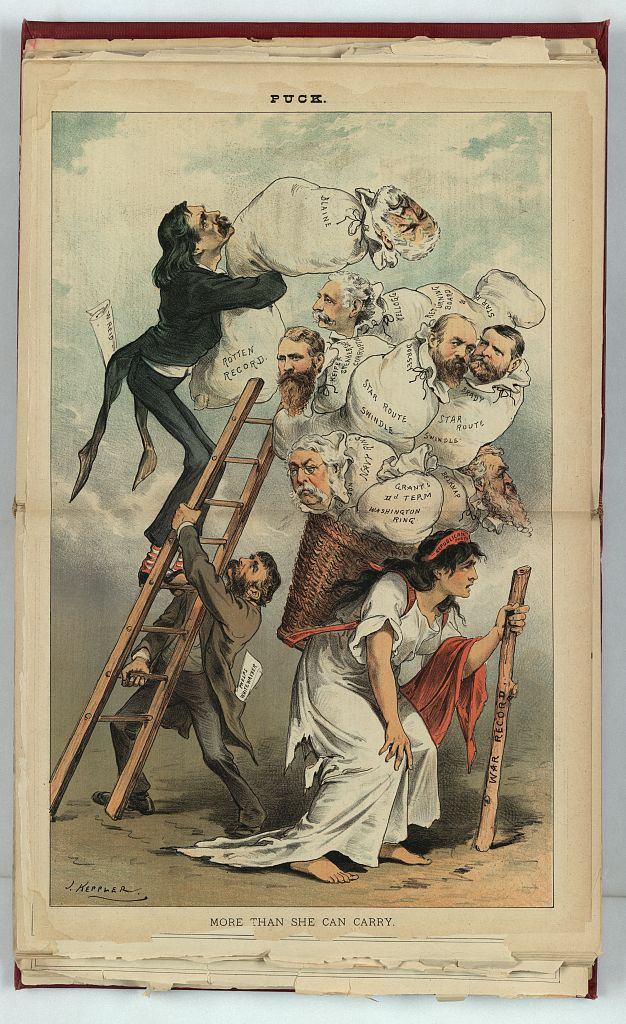
An 1884 cartoon depicting a woman as the symbol of the Republican Party, struggling to carry its leaders. Stephen W. Dorsey and Thomas J. Brady are depicted in sacks labeled "Star Route Swindle."

The Star Route scandal was a political scandal in the United States, stemming from allegations of bribery and bid rigging in the United States Post Office Department which came to light as early as 1872 and which were the focus of public scrutiny following the election of President James A. Garfield. There were no fewer than four federal investigations into bribery in the postal service from 1872 through 1883. The scandal and public reaction to it contributed to the passage of the Pendleton Civil Service Reform Act.

== Background ==
On March 3, 1845, the United States Congress established inland mail routes, eventually known as "Star Routes", derived from the "* * *" postal registry designation. The Star Routes were not officially serviced by the Post Office because they could not be accessed easily from a train depot or port. Instead, they were serviced by private contractors who delivered the mail.

In the period surrounding the American Civil War, transit along these routes increased due to rapid expansion in the Western and Southwestern regions of the United States, and the government contracts to service the routes became increasingly sought after. As population along the routes increased, contractors demanded increasingly high rates with little government oversight. Contractors would first make low "straw" bids for the routes, while other contractors in the ring would make exorbitantly high bids. Through a series of default bidding, the ring contractor would receive the contract route at an exorbitant high price. Profits from the excessively high contracts would be split between ringleaders. The ring consisted of a complex relationship between brokers, contractors, and appointed members of the Post Office. Millions of dollars were being depleted from the national treasury.

== Political scandal ==
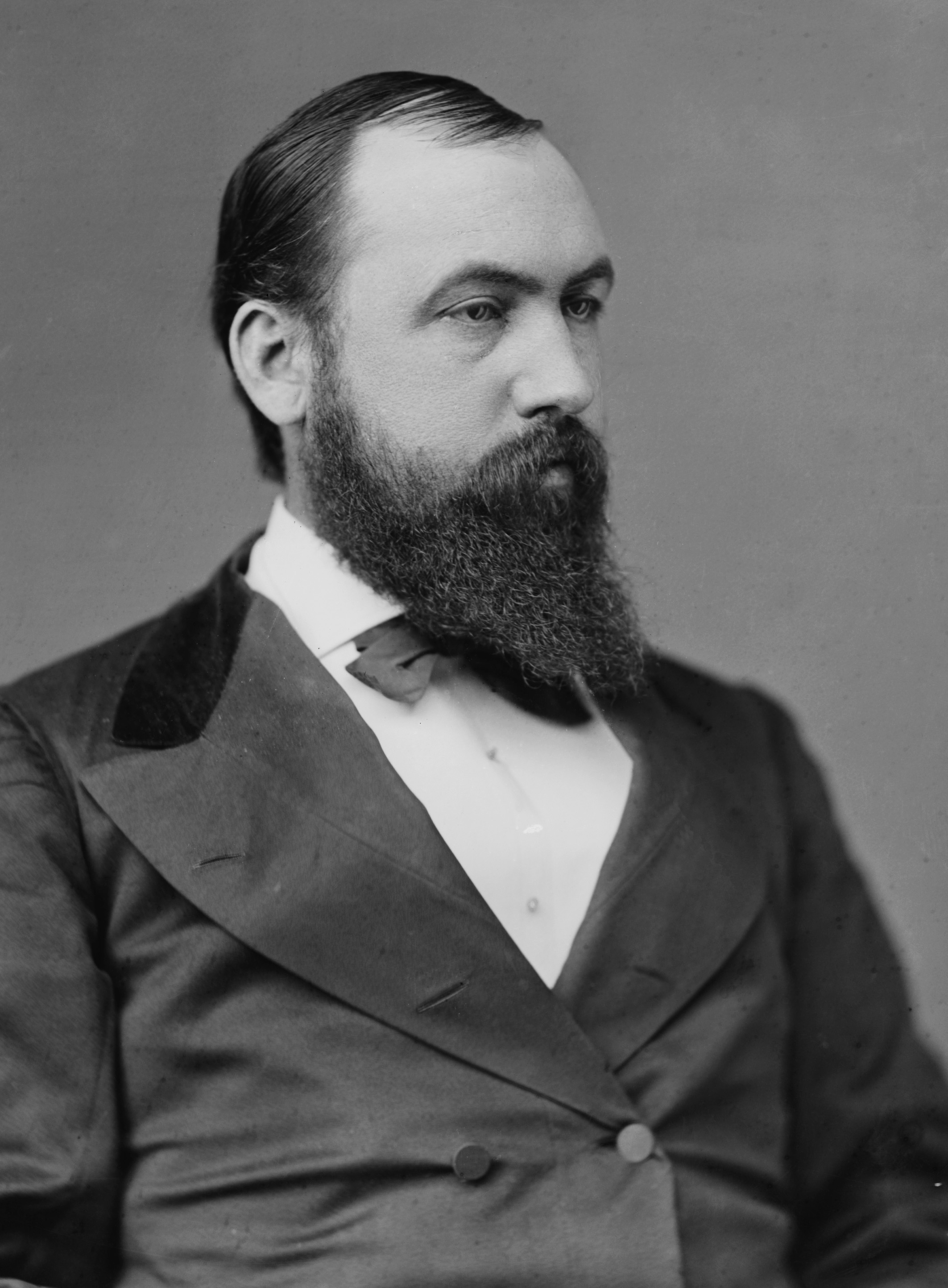
The implication of Stephen Wallace Dorsey, United States Senator and later the secretary of the Republican National Committee, added a political element to the scandal.

In 1876, United States Senator Stephen Wallace Dorsey of Arkansas and Assistant Postmaster General Thomas J. Brady, along with three other men, established the firm of Miner, Peck and Company and filed applications for the route contracts. In 1878, Miner Peck, Senator Dorsey, and other firms were the subject of the public allegations of improper benefit.

During the ensuing investigation, Dorsey convinced his fellow members of Congress that he had no knowledge of any illegality and had limited ties to the firm. However, when his term in the Senate expired in 1879, Dorsey became increasingly active in the management of Miner Peck.

In 1880, Dorsey was named secretary of the Republican National Committee following the nomination of his friend, James Garfield, for president. Dorsey was then accused of improper campaign spending in the state of Indiana, which Garfield won. Garfield appointed a reformer, Thomas Lemuel James, to serve as United States Postmaster General, and James raised the bid-rigging scandal to the President's attention. At the same time, The New York Times reported that the "Dorsey gang" had profited $412,000 (equivalent to $13,745,172 in 2025) from the scheme.

At an ensuing congressional investigation, Postmaster General James testified. According to Dorsey's personal secretary, Dorsey had "shammed sickness" during the congressional investigation and, during that time, the financial records of Miner Peck had been revised to cover up the fraud.

== Investigations ==
Investigations by Congress into corruption in the Post Office began as early as 1872 during the Presidency of Ulysses S. Grant. This investigation result had been tainted by bribery, while an 1876 investigation managed to shut down the Star Route frauds temporarily. A resurgence of graft stealthily took place in 1878 during the Presidency of Rutherford B. Hayes, continuing into the Garfield Administration. In April 1880, another Congressional investigation was launched. President Hayes stopped further awarding of Star Route contracts.

In April 1881, President James A. Garfield launched an investigation within the Star Routes corruption. Garfield's investigation revealed among the major players involved were some of the large contractors, the ex-US Representative Bradley Barlow of Vermont, the Second Assistant Postmaster-General, Thomas J. Brady, some of the subordinates in the department, and Arkansas Senator Stephen W. Dorsey, who became Secretary of the Republican National Committee during Garfield's 1880 presidential campaign. After Garfield's assassination, Chester A. Arthur (who assumed the presidency) pursued the investigation. Two federal prosecution trials took place in 1882 and 1883, and the postal ring was finally shut down. Although the fraudulent scheme was widespread, there were few convictions. Many of the defendants in the Star Routes trials were successfully defended by noted lawyer and orator, Robert Ingersoll. Brady and Dorsey were acquitted by the jury in the 1883 trial. Public disgust over the Star Routes graft served as an impetus for civil service reform and the passage of the Pendleton Civil Service Reform Act in 1883.

== See also ==
- Ulysses S. Grant presidential administration scandals
- Bibliography of Rutherford B. Hayes
- Timeline of the Rutherford B. Hayes presidency
- Outline of Rutherford B. Hayes
