= Ari Hoogenboom =

American academic and historian (1927–2014)

- Born: Ari Arthur Hoogenboom; November 28, 1927 New York City, Queens, New York
- Died: October 25, 2014 (aged 86) New York City, New York
- Occupation: Academic; educator; historian
- Education: Atlantic Union College; Columbia University
- Subject: American history
- Spouse: Olive Youngberg (m. 1949)
- Children: Lynn, Ari, Jan

Ari Arthur Hoogenboom (/'hoʊ gɛn buːm/, HOH-gen-boom; November 28, 1927 – October 25, 2014) was professor emeritus of history at Brooklyn College at the City University of New York. He was a scholar of the Gilded Age, particularly regarding the life and presidency of Rutherford B. Hayes.

== Life and career ==
Hoogenboom grew up in the Queens borough of New York City, where he graduated from John Adams High School. He later earned a bachelor's degree from Atlantic Union College. While at Atlantic, he met and married his wife, Olive, with whom he would later collaborate on several books. He attended graduate school at Columbia University, where he earned his M. A. and Ph.D., and was a student of David Herbert Donald. He taught history from 1956 to 1958 at the University of Texas at El Paso, and from 1958 to 1968 at Pennsylvania State University. He was awarded a Guggenheim Fellowship in 1965. Finally, from 1968 to 1998, he taught at Brooklyn College.

After his retirement from Brooklyn College, Hoogenboom authored Rutherford B. Hayes: One of the Good Colonels, and Gustavus Vasa Fox of the Union Navy: A Biography, about Assistant Secretary of the Navy Gustavus Fox. He worked with his wife, Olive, on one of her books, Washington Women: The Woodbury Sisters.

== Personal life & death ==
With his wife, Hoogenboom fathered three children: Lynn, Ari, and Jan.

Hoogenboom died in 2014, aged 86, from complications of mesothelioma.

== Bibliography ==
Title	Year	Publisher	Subject matter
Outlawing the Spoils: A History of the Civil Service Reform Movement, 1865-1883	1961		U.S. Civil Service Reform
Spoilsmen and Reformers (editor)	1964	Rand McNally & Co.	civil service reform, spoils system
The Enterprising Colonials: Society on the Eve of the Revolution (with William S. Sachs)	1965		
History of Pennsylvania (with Phillip S. Klein)	1973		History of Pennsylvania
A History of the ICC: From Panacea to Palliative (with Olive Hoogenboom)	1976		Interstate Commerce Commission
The Presidency of Rutherford B. Hayes	1988	University Press of Kansas	Rutherford B. Hayes
Rutherford B. Hayes: Warrior & President	1995	University Press of Kansas	Rutherford B. Hayes
Rutherford B. Hayes: One of the Good Colonels	1999	State House Press	Rutherford B. Hayes
Gustavus Vasa Fox of the Union Navy: A Biography	2008	Johns Hopkins University Press	Gustavus Fox
