= Bridgeton and Millville Traction Company =

The Bridgeton and Millville Traction Company was a streetcar company in southern New Jersey.

== Interurban lines ==
In addition to trackage in Bridgeton, the following interurban streetcar lines were operated:

- Bridgeton to Millville along the turnpike between the two towns, which the company also owned
- Bridgeton to Port Norris via Cedarville, along the main roads

== History ==
In 1897, the South Jersey Traction Company was sold at foreclosure to the Bridgeton and Millville Traction Company, which was chartered May 3, 1897. The Bridgeton Rapid Transit Company (5 miles) was leased by the B&M.

The line from Cedarville to Port Norris was built in 1902.

== Demise ==
The company ceased operations in 1922 due to being delinquent in paying taxes.

== See also ==
- List of New Jersey street railroads
