= Thomas J. Brady =

American Civil War General (1839–1094)

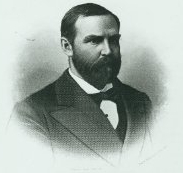
- Born: February 29, 1839; Muncie, Indiana
- Died: April 22, 1904 (aged 65); Jersey City, New Jersey
- Education: Indiana Asbury University

Thomas Jefferson Brady (February 12, 1839 – April 22, 1904) was an American Republican politician and Civil War officer.

== Early life and the Civil War ==
Brady was born in Muncie, Indiana in 1839, the son of John Brady, the first mayor of Muncie, and his wife, Mary Wright Brady. After graduating from Asbury College (now DePauw University), Brady taught school for several years before studying law and being admitted to the bar in 1860. At the outbreak of the Civil War, he joined the Union Army as a captain in the 8th Indiana Infantry Regiment. Brady served with that regiment until 1863, when he was promoted to colonel of the 140th Indiana Infantry Regiment. He was promoted to brevet brigadier general just before the end of the war, in March 1865, in recognition of his "long and meritorious service." During the war, in 1864, Brady was married to Emeline Wolfe. They had three children: Arthur, Elizabeth, and Winfield.

== Political career and Later Life ==
After the war, Brady resumed his law practice in Muncie, forming a partnership with Arthur C. Mellette. Brady also purchased the Muncie Weekly Times in 1868. In 1870, he was appointed consul to St. Thomas, then a part of the Danish Virgin Islands, where he served until 1875. He was appointed commissioner of internal revenue for Ohio and Indiana that year. The following year, President Ulysses S. Grant appointed Brady second assistant postmaster-general.

In his position with the postal service, Brady became embroiled in the Star Route scandal. Brady was alleged to have illegally profited in a scheme in which postal officials received bribes in exchange for awarding postal delivery contracts in southern and western areas. President Rutherford B. Hayes sustained Brady in office, but he resigned in 1881. Brady was indicted for conspiracy to defraud the government in 1882. A jury found him guilty, but the judge set aside the verdict. At a second trial the following year, Brady and his co-defendants were found not guilty.

Brady moved to Jersey City, New Jersey, where his son, Arthur, was president of the Union Traction Company. He died there in 1904.

== Sources ==
- Lanman, Charles; Morrison, Joseph M. (1887). Biographical Annals of the Civil Government of the United States. New York: J.M. Morrison.
- Helm, Thomas B. (1881). History of Delaware County. Chicago: Kingman Bros.
