= Newark–Trenton Fast Line =

The Newark–Trenton Fast Line was an interurban line from Newark, New Jersey to Trenton, New Jersey via Elizabeth and New Brunswick. It was owned and operated by the Public Service Railroad, a subsidiary of the Public Service Corporation of New Jersey.

Before the Public Service Railroad, the line was owned by several other companies:

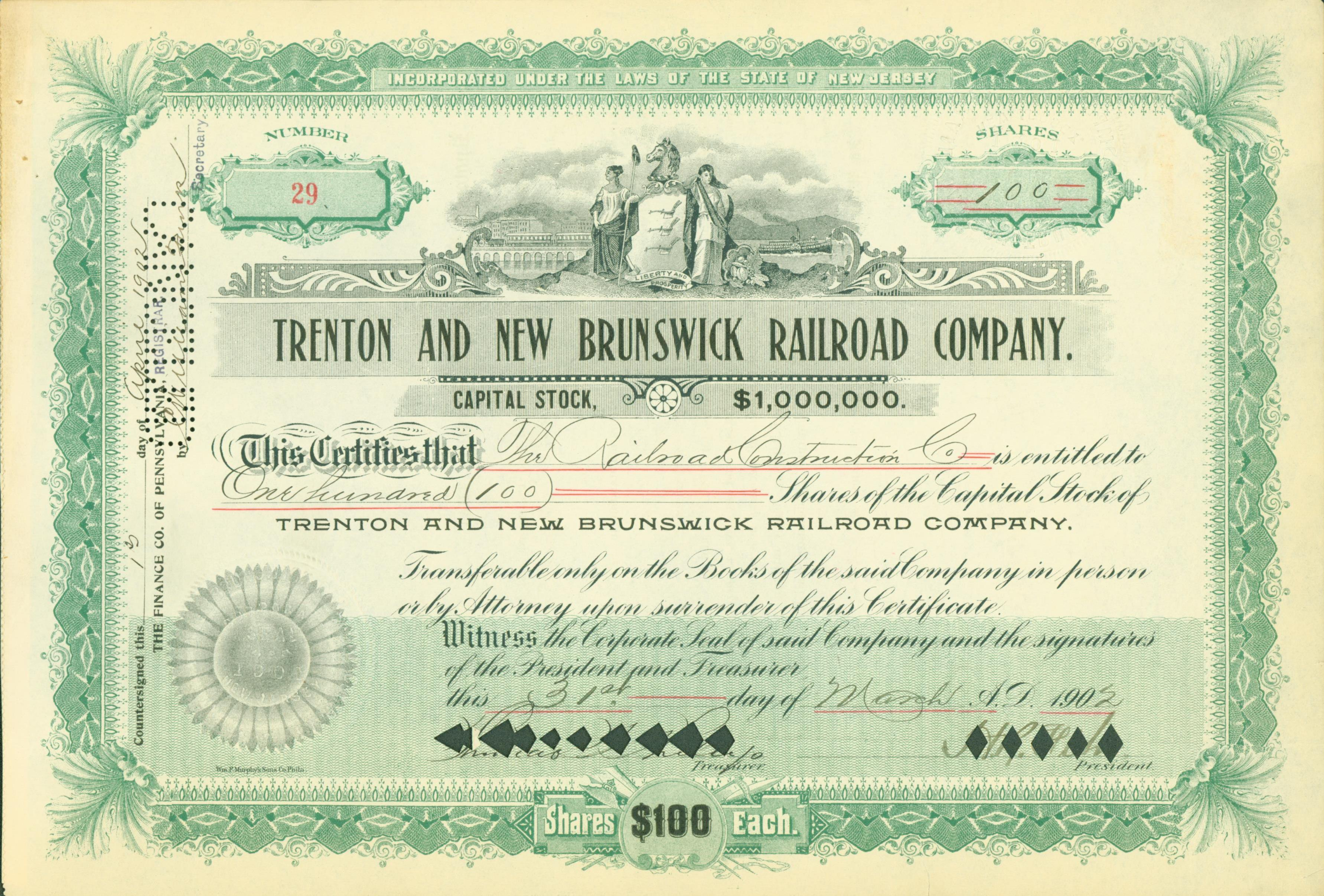
Share of the Trenton and New Brunswick Railroad Company, issued 31 March 1902

- Trenton and New Brunswick Railroad (Trenton to Milltown) - incorporated in 1902, opened on May 13, 1904
- New Jersey Short Line Railroad (Milltown to Elizabeth), not opened until 1913
- New York – Philadelphia Company - 1904 consolidation of the above two companies with the Camden and Trenton Railway, went bankrupt in 1908
- Elizabeth and Trenton Railroad - took over operations north of Trenton in 1910
- Public Service Railroad - created as a subsidiary of the Public Service Corporation of New Jersey, leased the Elizabeth and Trenton Railroad in 1913, opened on July 1, 1913

In Trenton, the line used trackage owned by the Trenton Terminal Railroad, a subsidiary of the Camden and Trenton Railway, a terminal railroad. This trackage began at Warren Street and State Street, and then used Warren Street, Bridge Street, Union Street, Federal Street, Lamberton Street, Cass Street, a one-way pair on Grand Street and Adeline Street, and Liberty Street onto a private right-of-way east of Olden Avenue.

The line between Main Street in Milltown (south of New Brunswick) and Main Street south of Metuchen was graded by the NJ Short Line but was never completed. When the line was finished by Public Service, existing trackage through New Brunswick was used along Main Street, Milltown Road, Georges Road, private right-of-way between Mile Run Brook and the Raritan River Railroad, Commercial Avenue, Sandford Street, Throop Avenue, George Street, Albany Street, Raritan Avenue, Woodbridge Avenue, and Main Street.

Existing trackage was also used from Elizabeth to Newark, on Bayway, Broad Street, Newark Avenue, Frelinghuysen Avenue, a one-way pair on Miller Street and Vanderpool Street, and Broad Street.

Two branches on the line north of New Brunswick were built, one to Carteret and one towards Perth Amboy, both merging towards the north. The Carteret branch used shuttle operations, with a transfer at the junction with the mainline, but Perth Amboy trains ran all the way to Newark. On the Perth Amboy end, they used existing trackage from the end of private right-of-way along Woodbridge Avenue, East Avenue, Broad Street, private right-of-way south, west across West Avenue, and south along the east side of the CNJ line to the Woodbridge Creek bridge, then south on West Avenue and State Street, ending at Smith Street.

The Newark Public Service Terminal opened on May 1, 1916, and the line was rerouted to use it via a one-way pair on Green Street and Lafayette Street, and Mulberry Street to the upper level. The line was split at New Brunswick in January 1924, with a transfer required to stay on the route. When Public Service numbered their routes, it was #15-New Brunswick-Trenton and #47-New Brunswick-Newark, with #7-Carteret and #45-Perth Amboy on the branches. The line was taken out of the Public Service Terminal on June 11, 1933.

By 1927, experiments began with a rail-bus that had tires and train wheels; this was used by 1934. On January 16, 1936, trains stopped running south of New Brunswick; the line north of New Brunswick continued running until May 11, 1937. The right-of-way is now used for high-voltage power lines.

== See also ==
- List of New Jersey street railroads
