= Union Traction Company (New Jersey) =

- Industry: Public transportation
- Founded: 1894
- Fate: Merged
- Successor: Public Service Railway

The Union Traction Company was a trolley line that ran from Hackensack through Carlstadt to Rutherford, New Jersey. The line was conceived by Delos E. Culver. Originally the line was to run from Hackensack to Kearny, New Jersey but the company became insolvent and was merged into other trolley lines before the line could be fully built.

== See also ==
- List of New Jersey street railroads
