= Paterson, Passaic and Rutherford Electric Railway =

- Industry: Public transportation
- Founded: 1893
- Fate: Merged
- Successor: New Jersey Electric Railway

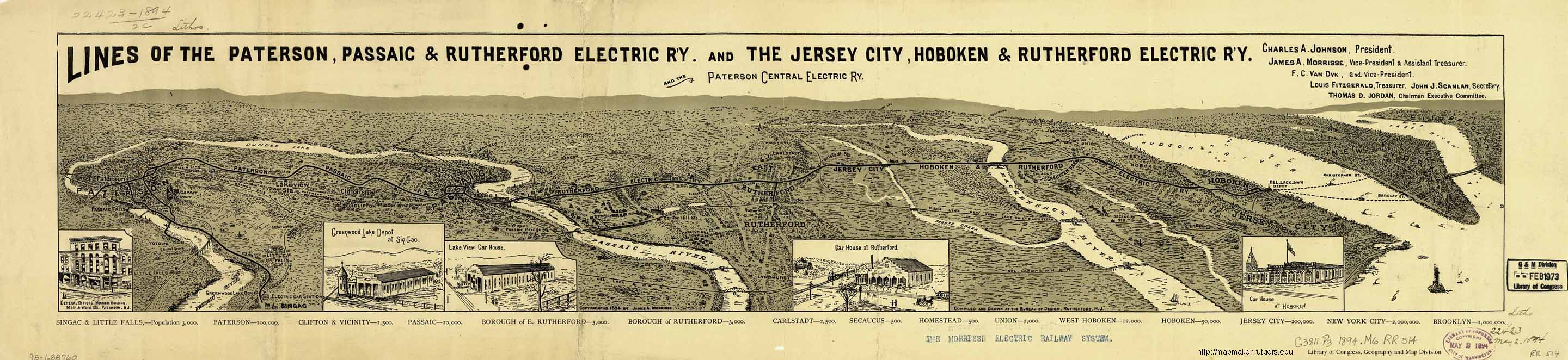
Panoramic map showing the rail system.

The Paterson, Passaic and Rutherford Electric Railway was a trolley line of 40.57 miles in track length incorporated in 1893 as a consolidation of Paterson & Little Falls Electric Railway Co., Grant Street Electric Railway Co., People's Park Railway Co., Paterson & Passaic Electric Railway Co. and Passaic, Rutherford & Carlstadt Electric Railway Co. located in northern New Jersey, the company was leased from 1894–1899 to the New Jersey Electric Railway Co.

== See also ==
- List of New Jersey street railroads
- Jersey City, Hoboken and Rutherford Electric Railway
