= Passaic, Rutherford and Carlstadt Electric Railway =

- Industry: Public transportation
- Founded: 1889
- Defunct: 1893
- Fate: Merged
- Successor: Paterson, Passaic and Rutherford Electric Railway

The Passaic, Rutherford and Carlstadt Electric Railway was a trolley line incorporated in 1889 and consolidated into the Paterson, Passaic and Rutherford Electric Railway in 1893.

It served the Rutherford station on the Erie Railroad-controlled Paterson and Hudson River Railroad (today's Bergen County Line and the Carlstadt station on the Erie-controlled Hackensack and New York Railroad (today's Pascack Valley Line, although the station has been removed), using Paterson Plank Road for most of its length.

- List of New Jersey street railroads
