= Jersey City, Hoboken and Rutherford Electric Railway =

1890s railroad in New Jersey

- Industry: Public transportation
- Founded: 1893
- Fate: Merged
- Successor: New Jersey Electric Railway

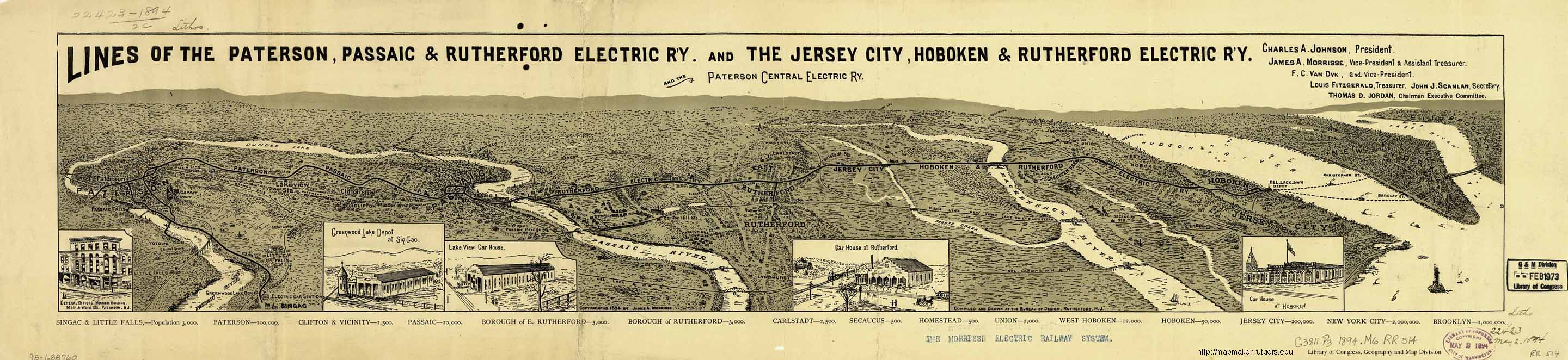
Panoramic map showing the rail system.

The Jersey City, Hoboken and Rutherford Electric Railway was incorporated in 1893, and leased from 1894-1899 to the New Jersey Electric Railway Company. The line was operated by Jersey City, Hoboken and Paterson Street Railway. The track length was 18.57 miles.

The rail line in Hoboken, New Jersey, was controversial at the time. Officials were concerned that an electric railway would endanger the public and frighten horses.

== See also ==
- Paterson Plank Road
- List of New Jersey street railroads
- Paterson, Passaic and Rutherford Electric Railway
