= Transport of New Jersey =

Steel Railway and bus company (1917–1980)

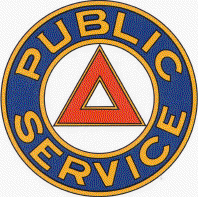
- Public Service Logo

Overview
- Owner: Public Service Corporation
- Area served: New Jersey
- Locale: New Jersey
- Transit type: Tram and Bus

Operation
- Began operation: 1917
- Ended operation: 1980; 46 years ago

Transport of New Jersey (TNJ), earlier Public Service Transportation and then Public Service Coordinated Transport, was a street railway and bus company in the U.S. state of New Jersey from 1917 to 1980, when NJ Transit took over their operations. It was owned by the Public Service Corporation, now the Public Service Electric and Gas Company.

== History ==
=== 20th century ===
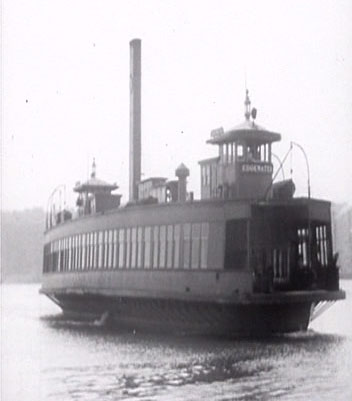
The Public Service-operated Edgewater, running the 125th Street Ferry route from Edgewater Ferry Terminal to 125th Street in Manhattan in 1941

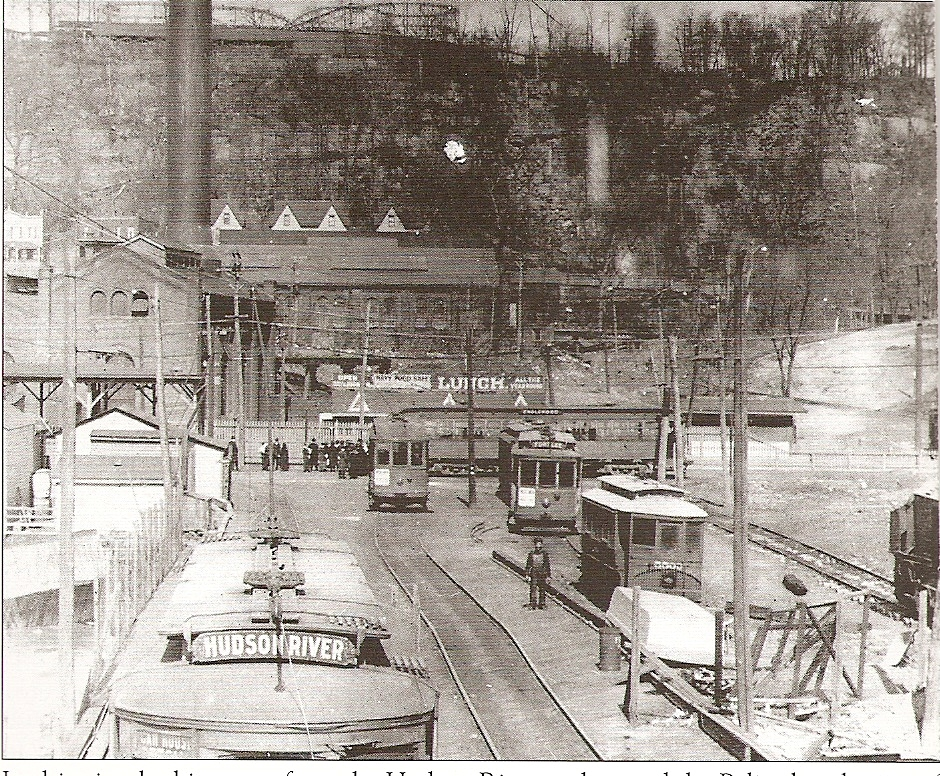
Edgewater trolley terminal in the early 20th century

The Public Service Railway operated most of the trolley lines in New Jersey by the early 20th century. Public Service lines stretched from northeast New Jersey to Trenton, and then south to Camden and its suburbs. Major parts of the system were:

- The Newark Public Service Terminal, a two-level terminal in downtown Newark.
- The Hoboken Inclined Cable Railway, an elevated railway from Hoboken Terminal up the New Jersey Palisades into Jersey City and south to near Journal Square.
- The Newark-Trenton Fast Line, an interurban streetcar line mostly on private right-of-way from Newark to Trenton.

Public Service Transportation was formed in 1917 as a bus-operating subsidiary of the Public Service Corporation, supplementing the Public Service Railway's trolley lines. In 1928, the operations of the two companies were merged to form Public Service Coordinated Transport. Over time, Public Service bustituted most routes.

The name was changed to Transport of New Jersey in 1971. PSE&G sold TNJ to New Jersey Transit Corporation in 1980. Although PSCT/TNJ had been a major profit center for PSE&G earlier in the century, PSE&G had increasingly felt chagrin at having to retain unprofitable routes, and believed the state could provide better service. PSE&G chairman Robert Smith said that he and his colleagues felt they were "getting rid of a headache." Many of former PSCT/TNJ bus routes are still run by NJ Transit and even use the same number.

Following bustitution, the only streetcar route still in operation was the #7 line, in the form of the Newark City Subway.

=== 21st century ===
At the turn of the 21st century, the line was upgraded to operate new modern light rail cars, and was extended northward into Bloomfield. The system was renamed the Newark Light Rail. Additionally, a portion of an old spur tunnel to the abandoned Cedar Street Subway, another Public Service trolley conduit, has been rehabilitated and use to connect a second light rail line, which opened for service in 2006.

== See also ==
- List of Public Service Railway lines
- Midtown Bridge (Hackensack River)
