= National Register of Historic Places listings in Henry County, Missouri =

Location of Henry County in Missouri

This is a list of the National Register of Historic Places listings in Henry County, Missouri.

This is intended to be a complete list of the properties and districts on the National Register of Historic Places in Henry County, Missouri, United States. Latitude and longitude coordinates are provided for many National Register properties and districts; these locations may be seen together in a map.

There are 8 properties and districts listed on the National Register in the county.

This National Park Service list is complete through NPS recent listings posted March 14, 2025.

== Current listings ==
	Name on the Register	Image	Date listed	Location	City or town	Description
1	Anheuser-Busch Brewing Association Building		August 9, 1991 (#91001030)	203 W. Franklin St. 38°22′15″N 93°46′41″W	Clinton	
2	C.M. and Vina Clark House		January 16, 1997 (#96001598)	704 California Ave. 38°15′41″N 93°59′09″W	Montrose	
3	Clinton Square Historic District	Clinton Square Historic District	February 7, 2007 (#07000019)	Roughly 100 blocks on N. and S. Main, S. Washington, W. Franklin, and W. Jefferson; 38°22′13″N 93°46′36″W	Clinton	
4	William F. and Julia Crome House		March 25, 1999 (#99000380)	305 S. Second St. 38°22′03″N 93°46′27″W	Clinton	
5	Judge Jerubial Gideon Dorman House	Judge Jerubial Gideon Dorman House	February 10, 1983 (#83000992)	302 W. Franklin St. 38°22′14″N 93°46′47″W	Clinton	
6	Gustave C. Haysler House		July 21, 1995 (#95000859)	301 S. Second St. 38°22′04″N 93°46′27″W	Clinton	
7	St. Ludger Catholic Church		April 13, 1998 (#98000365)	Junction of Route K and High St. 38°17′26″N 94°01′13″W	Montrose	
8	C.C. Williams House		October 21, 1982 (#82000584)	303 W. Franklin St. 38°22′16″N 93°46′46″W	Clinton	

== See also ==
- List of National Historic Landmarks in Missouri
- National Register of Historic Places listings in Missouri
