= KDKD =

KDKD may refer to:

- KDKD-FM, a radio station (95.3 FM) licensed to Clinton, Missouri, United States
- KDKD (AM), a defunct radio station (1280 AM) formerly licensed to Clinton, Missouri
