= St. Louis–San Francisco 4500 =

Preserved American 4-8-4 locomotive

St. Louis–San Francisco Railway 4500
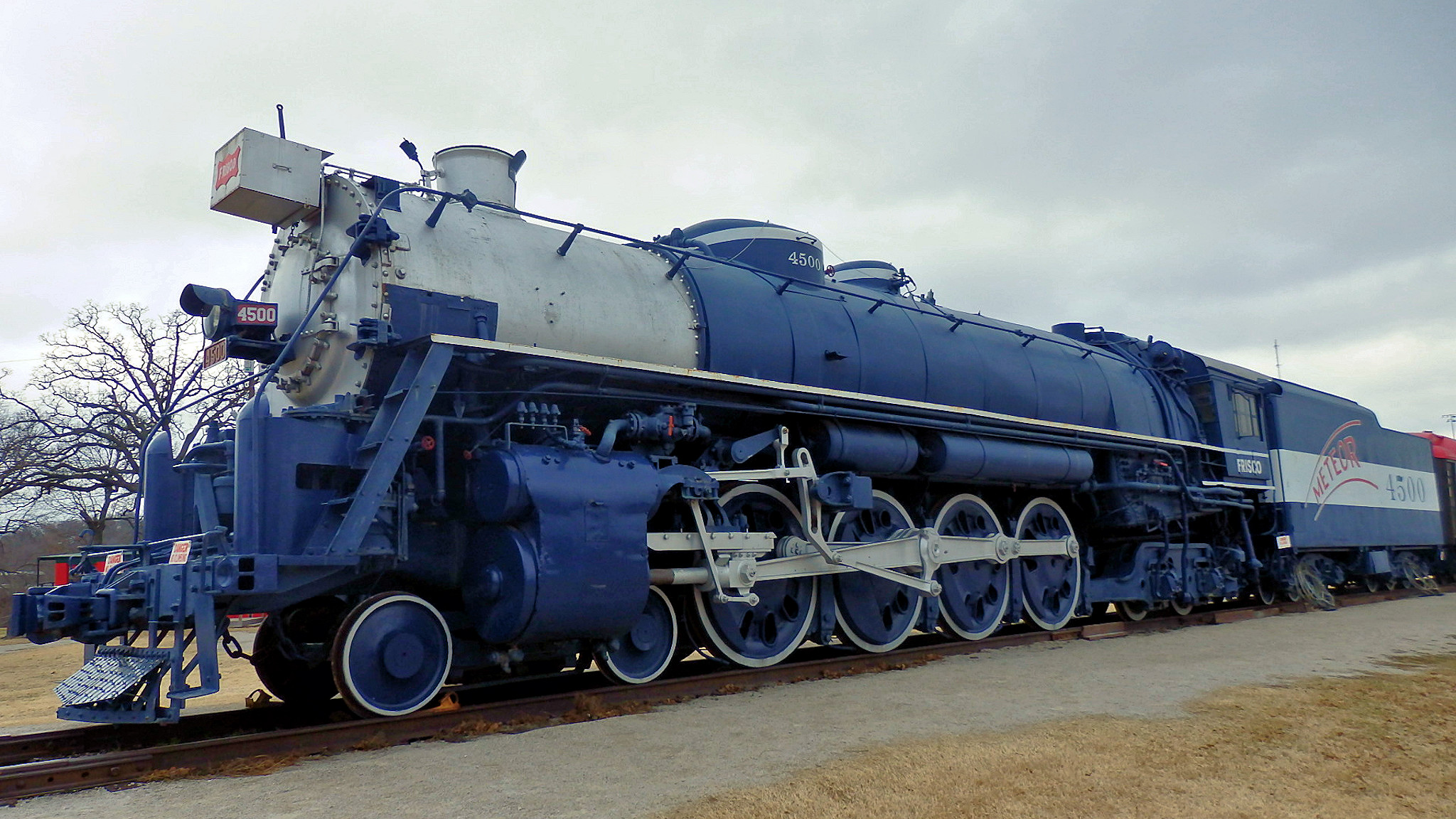
- No. 4500 on static display, January 2020
Type and origin
- Power type: Steam
- Builder: Baldwin Locomotive Works
- Serial number: 64449
- Build date: November 1942
Specifications
- Configuration
  - Whyte: 4-8-4
- Gauge: 4 ft 8 1/2 in (1,435 mm) standard gauge
- Leading dia.: 38 in (965 mm)
- Driver dia.: 74 in (1,880 mm)
- Trailing dia.: 44 in (1,118 mm)
- Axle load: 70,620 lb (32,032.7 kilograms; 32.0 tonnes)
- Adhesive weight: 280,340 lb (127,000 kg)
- Loco weight: 464,850 lb (210,900 kg)
- Tender weight: 346,200 lb (157,030 kg)
- Total weight: 811,050 lb (367,900 kg)
- Fuel type: Oil
- Fuel capacity: 6,500 US gal (25,000 L; 5,400 imp gal)
- Water cap.: 18,000 US gal (68,000 L; 15,000 imp gal)
- Boiler: 88 in (2 m) (front); 100 in (3 m) (back)
- Boiler pressure: 255 lbf/in^{2} (1.76 MPa)
- Cylinders: Two, outside
- Cylinder size: 28 in × 31 in (711 mm × 787 mm)
- Valve gear: Walschaerts
- Valve type: Piston valves
- Loco brake: Air
- Train brakes: Air
- Couplers: Knuckle
Performance figures
- Maximum speed: 90 mph (145 km/h)
- Tractive effort: 71,200 lbf (317 kN), 80,800 lbf (359 kN) with booster
- Factor of adh.: 3.94
Career
- Operators: St. Louis-San Francisco
- Class: 4500
- First run: 1942
- Retired: 1950s
- Disposition: On static display

St. Louis–San Francisco Railway 4000 is a 4-8-4 "Northern" type steam locomotive.

== History ==
No. 4500 was built as an oil-burning steam locomotive by Baldwin in 1942 for Frisco passenger service. It was the first 4-8-4 Northern that Frisco ordered. Along with similar locomotives 4501 and 4502, it was painted in the zephyr blue, white and gray paint scheme with "Meteor" spelled out on the side of the tender in bold, red letters. It was used for pulling Frisco's crack Meteor train service. No. 4500 even saw service pulling Frisco's Texas Special. When the Meteor was dieselized, No. 4500 was re-painted into Frisco's standard black with gold striping and lettering, and assigned to passenger trains such as the Will Rogers.

== Specifications ==
While the Frisco 4500-series 4-8-4s designed to be coal-burning weighed 474,070 lbs (Nos. 4503-4514) and 479,300 lbs (Nos. 4515-4524), oil-burning models like Numbers 4500 to 4502 weighed 464,850 lbs. But the whole series had 74" drivers, 28 x 31 cylinders, a boiler pressure of 250 psi, and a tractive effort of 71,200 pounds.

== Preservation ==
No. 4500 was repainted back into the Meteor paint scheme and is on static display for free public viewing at the Route 66 Historical Village at 3770 Southwest Blvd. in Tulsa, Oklahoma.
