= St. Louis–San Francisco class 4500 =

Class of American steam locomotives

St. Louis–San Francisco 4500 class
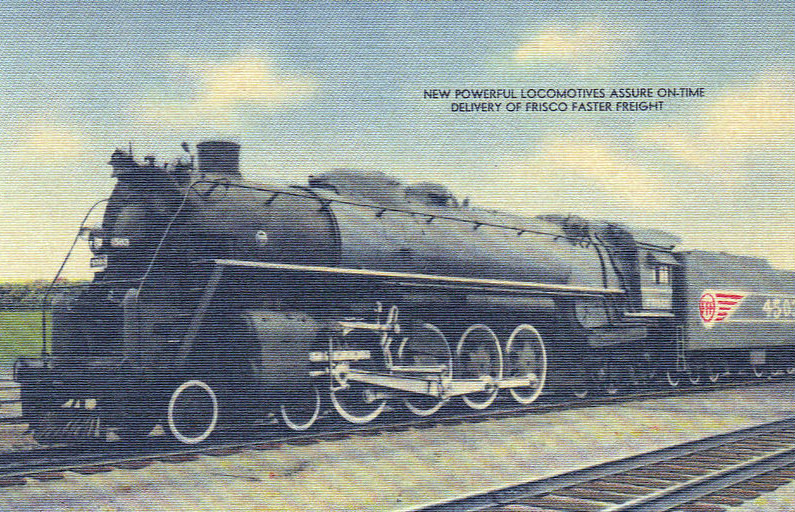
- Postcard photo of Frisco locomotive #4503, a 4-8-4 "Northern" produced by Baldwin for the railroad in 1943.
Type and origin
- Power type: Steam
- Builder: Baldwin Locomotive Works
- Serial number: 64437-64451, 69731-69740
- Build date: 1942-1943
- Total produced: 25
Specifications
- Configuration
  - Whyte: 4-8-4
  - UIC: 2′D2′ h2
- Gauge: 4 ft 8 1/2 in (1,435 mm) standard gauge
- Leading dia.: 38 in (965 mm)
- Driver dia.: 74 in (1,880 mm)
- Trailing dia.: 44 in (1,118 mm)
- Wheelbase: Loco & tender: 92.33 ft (28.14 m)
- Axle load: 70,640 lb (32,040 kilograms; 32.04 metric tons)
- Adhesive weight: 280,340 lb (127,160 kilograms; 127.16 metric tons)
- Loco weight: 4500-4502: 464,850 lb (210,850 kilograms; 210.85 metric tons); 4503-4514: 474,040 lb (215,020 kilograms; 215.02 metric tons); 4515-4524: 479,300 lb (217,400 kilograms; 217.4 metric tons)
- Tender weight: 4500-4502: 346,200 lb (157,000 kilograms; 157.0 metric tons); 4503-4524: 341,300 lb (154,800 kilograms; 154.8 metric tons)
- Total weight: 4500-4502: 811,050 lb (367,890 kilograms; 367.89 metric tons); 4503-4514: 815,340 lb (369,830 kilograms; 369.83 metric tons); 4515-4524: 820,600 lb (372,200 kilograms; 372.2 metric tons)
- Fuel type: 4500-4502: Fuel oil 4503-4524: Coal
- Fuel capacity: 4500-4502: 6,500 US gal (25,000 L; 5,400 imp gal); 4503-4524: 22 t (22 long tons; 24 short tons)
- Water cap.: 18,000 US gal (68,000 L; 15,000 imp gal)
- Firebox
  - Grate area: 88 sq ft (8.2 m^{2})
- Boiler: 88 in (2 m) (front); 100 in (3 m) (back)
- Boiler pressure: 255 lbf/in^{2} (1.76 MPa)
- Heating surface
  - Firebox: 524.50 sq ft (48.728 m^{2})
- Superheater
  - Heating area: 1,508 sq ft (140.1 m^{2})
- Cylinders: Two
- Cylinder size: 28 in × 31 in (711 mm × 787 mm)
- Valve gear: Walschaert
Performance figures
- Maximum speed: 90 mph (140 km/h)
- Power output: 5,600 hp (4,200 kW)
- Tractive effort: 71,200 lbf (316.71 kN); 80,800 lbf (359 kN) with booster
- Factor of adh.: 3.94
Career
- Operators: St. Louis–San Francisco
- Class: 4500
- Numbers: 4500–4524
- Delivered: 1942-1943
- Retired: 1952-1956
- Preserved: Frisco 4500 on display in Tulsa, Oklahoma; Frisco 4501 on display in Frisco, Texas; Frisco 4516 on display in Sedalia, Missouri; Frisco 4524 on display in Springfield, Missouri
- Disposition: Four (Nos. 4500, 4501, 4516 and 4524) preserved, remainder scrapped

The St. Louis–San Francisco class 4500 was a class of 25 4-8-4 "Northern" type steam locomotives built by the Baldwin Locomotive Works between 1942-1943 and operated by the St. Louis–San Francisco Railway.

The first three operated in passenger service, pulling trains such as the Meteor. The rest pulled freight throughout the system until retirement by the early 1950s. Four 4500s has been preserved and all are on display.

== History ==
The first three (Nos 4500–4502) were built as oil-burning steam locomotives in 1942 for Frisco passenger service. They were painted in the zephyr blue, white and gray paint scheme with "Meteor" spelled out on the side of the tender in bold, red letters. They were used for pulling Frisco's crack Meteor train service. They also saw service pulling Frisco's Texas Special. When the Meteor was dieselized, the locomotives were re-painted into Frisco's standard black with gold striping and lettering, and assigned to passenger trains such as the Will Rogers. The latter twelve (Nos. 4503–4514) were also built in 1942, but as coal burners and pulled fast freight throughout the Frisco system. The last ten (Nos. 4515–4524) were built in 1943 as coal burners and also pulled freight. Despite the latter 22 being intended for freight service, they have also pulled passenger trains on occasion. Some of the earlier locomotives were equipped with boosters. In 1948, Frisco 4501 still in its Meteor livery pulled President Harry S. Truman's whistle stop tour train through his home state of Missouri. Their design was also similar to the Chicago, Burlington and Quincy Railroad's O-5 class of Northerns, though there were some differences.

As the Frisco was dieselising, the locomotives was assigned to secondary passenger trains such as the General Wood and all were out of operation and put into storage by 1952.

== Preservation ==
Four 4500s survived into preservation:

- 4500 is on display for free public viewing at the Route 66 Historical Village at 3770 Southwest Blvd. in Tulsa, Oklahoma.
- 4501 is on display at the Museum of the American Railroad in Frisco, Texas.
- 4516 is on display at Missouri State Fair Grounds in Sedalia, Missouri.
- 4524 is on display at Grant Beach Park in Springfield, Missouri.

== Roster ==
Number	Baldwin serial number	Date built	Disposition	Notes
4500	64437	November 1942	On display at the Route 66 Historical Village at 3770 Southwest Blvd. in Tulsa, Oklahoma.	Repainted to the Meteor paint scheme before display.
4501	64438	November 1942	On display at the Museum of the American Railroad in Frisco, Texas.	Repainted to the Meteor paint scheme before display.
4502	64439	1942	Sold for scrap.	
4503	64440	1942	Sold for scrap.	
4504	64441	1942	Sold for scrap.	
4505	64442	1942	Sold for scrap.	
4506	64443	1942	Sold for scrap.	
4507	64444	1942	Sold for scrap.	
4508	64445	1942	Sold for scrap.	
4509	64446	1942	Sold for scrap.	
4510	64447	1942	Sold for scrap.	
4511	64448	1942	Sold for scrap.	
4512	64449	1942	Sold for scrap.	
4513	64450	1942	Sold for scrap.	
4514	64451	1942	Sold for scrap.	
4515	69731	1943	Sold for scrap.	
4516	69732	August 1943	On display at Missouri State Fair Grounds in Sedalia, Missouri.	Nicknamed "Old Smokie".
4517	69733	1943	Sold for scrap.	
4518	69734	1943	Sold for scrap.	
4519	69735	1943	Sold for scrap.	
4520	69736	1943	Sold for scrap.	
4521	69737	1943	Sold for scrap.	
4522	69738	1943	Sold for scrap.	
4523	69739	1943	Sold for scrap.	
4524	69740	September 1943	On display at Grant Beach Park in Springfield, Missouri.	Last steam locomotive built for the Frisco. Painted in the "Frisco Faster Freight" paint scheme.
