= 4500 class =

4500 class or Class 4500 may refer to:

- GWR 4500 Class, 2-6-2T steam locomotives
- St. Louis–San Francisco class 4500, 4-8-4 steam locomotives
