= KDKD (AM) =

Clinton, Missouri; United States
- Frequency: 1280 kHz
- Branding: 1280 KDKD-AM

Programming
- Format: Defunct (was Farm and conservative talk)
- Affiliations: Fox News Radio, Westwood One

Ownership
- Owner: Clayton and Brittany Radford; (Radford Media Group, LLC)
- Sister stations: KDKD-FM, KXEA

History
- First air date: May 11, 1951
- Last air date: December 31, 2021

Technical information
- Facility ID: 12058
- Class: D
- Power: 1,000 watts day 58 watts night
- Transmitter coordinates: 38°23′42″N 93°46′18″W

KDKD (1280 AM) was a radio station broadcasting a farm and conservative talk format. Licensed to Clinton, Missouri, United States, the station was owned by Clayton and Brittany Radford, through licensee Radford Media Group, LLC. KDKD featured programming from Fox News Radio and Westwood One.

== History ==
KDKD signed on May 11, 1951, as a 1,000-watt daytimer owned by David M. Segal, joining a group that already included KTFS in Texarkana, Texas; KDMS in El Dorado, Arkansas; WGVM in Greenville, Mississippi; and KDAS in Malvern, Arkansas. Additional stakes in the station were held by Lee E. Baker and Jeanne F. Baker; the license was held by a partnership doing business as Clinton Broadcasting Company. The Clinton Broadcasting Company sold the station to the Osage Broadcasting Company in 1956.

== Closure ==
On December 27, 2021, Radford Media Group announced that KDKD would shut down on at 5:15 p.m. on December 31, after being informed by Crown Castle that the station's tower was to be dismantled in January 2022. KDKD's final program, a 15-minute retrospective on the station's history, simulcasted on KDKD-FM. Kansas City Royals broadcasts, which had aired on KDKD since the team's inception, were moved to sister station KXEA. The final song played on KDKD was God Bless the U.S.A. by Lee Greenwood. The retrospective was actually five minutes before KDKD-FM went straight to an unscripted station ID & then "All Too Well (10 Minute Version)" by Taylor Swift for the remainder of its intended airtime. (Due to conservative owners, KDKD played a censored version removing the line 'Fuck the patriarchy' in KDKD’s broadcast)

The station's license was cancelled by the Federal Communications Commission on September 22, 2022.
