= Meteor (train) =

Former passenger train service

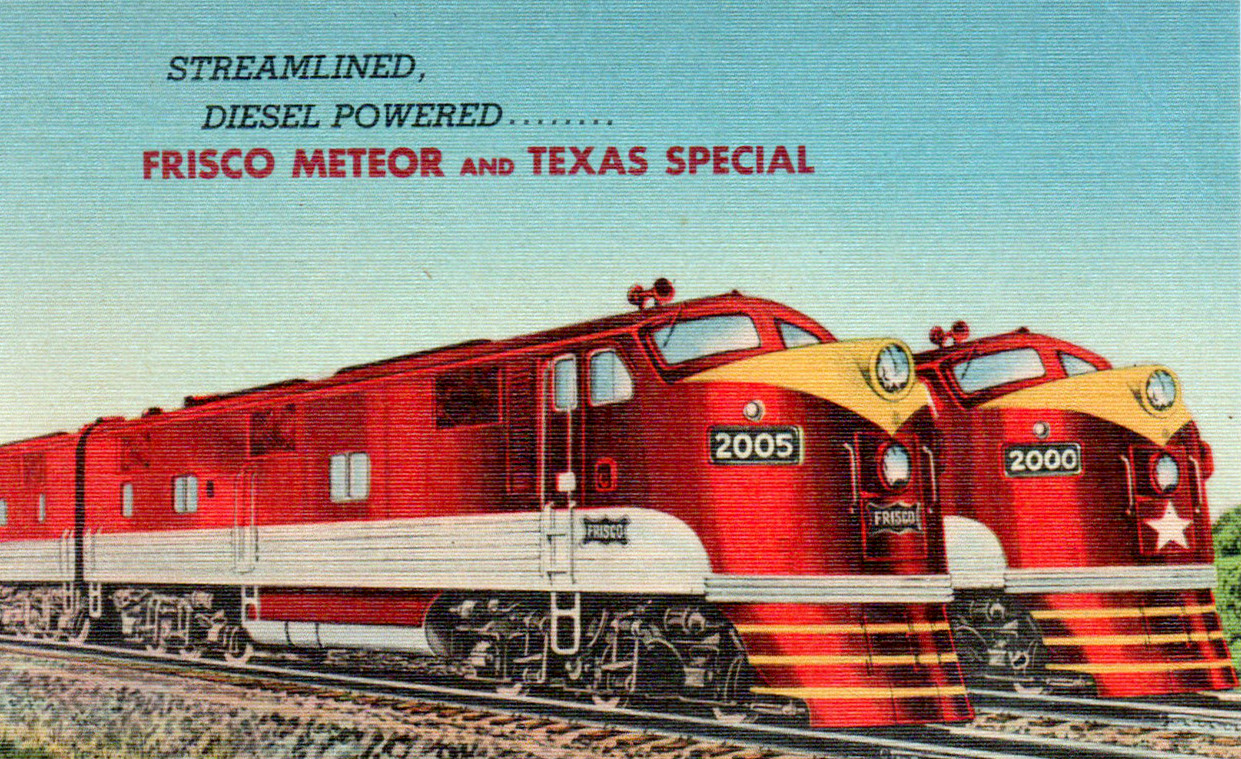
- The Meteor at left, with the Texas Special as diesel equipped trains and new colors.

Overview
- Service type: Inter-city rail
- Status: Discontinued
- Locale: Midwestern United States/Southwestern United States
- First service: 1902
- Last service: 1965
- Former operator: St. Louis – San Francisco Railway

Route
- Termini: St. Louis, Missouri; Lawton, Oklahoma
- Distance travelled: 631.5 miles (1,016.3 km) (St. Louis-Lawton, 1959)
- Service frequency: Daily
- Train numbers: 9 (southwest-bound), 10 (northeast-bound)

On-board services
- Seating arrangements: Reclining chair car
- Sleeping arrangements: Roomettes and double bedrooms
- Catering facilities: Chair-lounge-buffet car; diner-lounge car (1959)

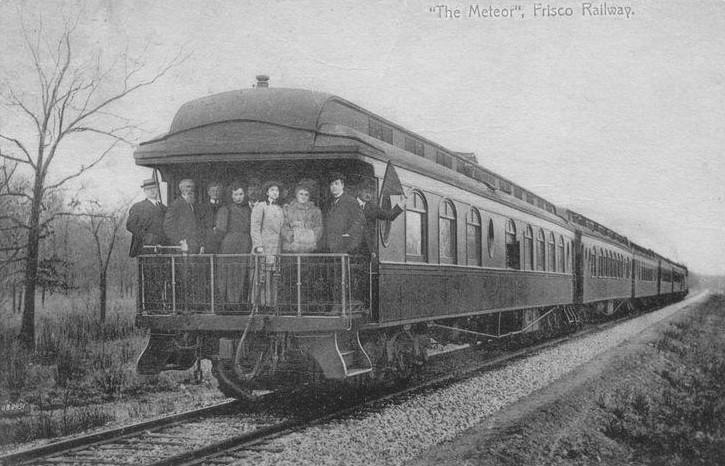
The Meteor in 1909.

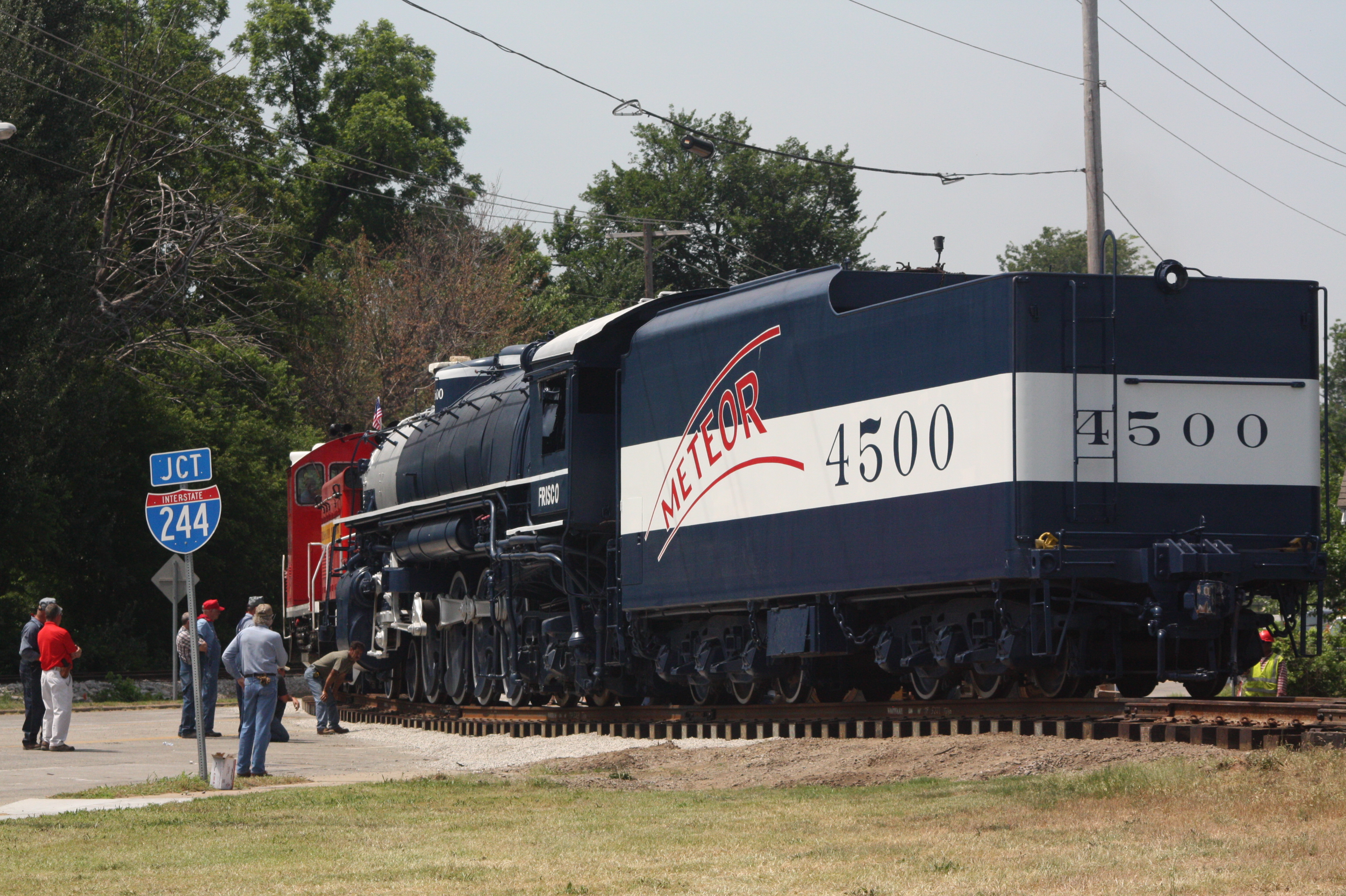
The Meteor 4500 moved to its permanent position in Tulsa, OK.

The Meteor was a named passenger train operated by the St. Louis-San Francisco Railway (a.k.a. SLSF or "the Frisco"). It ran overnight between Oklahoma City and St. Louis via Tulsa and was later extended to Lawton, Oklahoma on July 18, 1955. The name was shared with a branch line Meteor running between Monett, Missouri, and Paris, Texas. Later this line was truncated to terminate at Fort Smith, Arkansas.

The Meteor was inaugurated between St. Louis and Tulsa in 1902. One engineer who joined the Frisco in 1917 recalled that the Meteor was already a well-known train at that time. Initially the trains were pulled by Frisco-class 1300 locomotives, being high-wheeled Baldwin engines with 2-8-0 wheel arrangements. During the late 1930s and into the early years of World War II, Frisco-class 1500 Baldwin engines with 4-8-2 wheel arrangements took over the job.

Frisco-class 4500 locomotives, and specifically locomotives No. 4500, 4501 and 4502, being three of twenty-five Northern class Baldwin 4-8-4s built for Frisco during World War II, were later designated for use on the Meteor. These locomotives were delivered in a distinctive zephyr blue, white and gray paint scheme with "Meteor" spelled out across the tender in bold red lettering. These three passenger engines also saw service pulling the Texas Special. In 1948, Frisco 4501 still in its Meteor livery pulled President Harry S. Truman's whistle stop tour train through his home state of Missouri.

When the Meteor was converted to use diesel locomotives, No. 4500 was re-painted into Frisco's standard black with gold striping and lettering and assigned to passenger trains such as the Will Rogers. The cosmetically-restored No. 4500, back in its Meteor paint scheme, now resides at the Route 66 Historical Village at 3770 Southwest Blvd. in Tulsa, Oklahoma. Engine No. 4501, also in the Meteor paint scheme, resides at the Museum of the American Railroad, in Frisco, Texas.

The streamlined, diesel equipped Meteor began westbound operations on May 14, 1948, with its first eastbound train departing Oklahoma City on May 15. At the end of its maiden trip the president of the Frisco, while giving an interview in his private railcar attached to the train, pointed to a glass filled nearly to the brim with water. "Not a drop spilled between St. Louis and Tulsa," he said proudly. Frisco purchased the EMD E7 locomotives and Pullman cars for the Meteor at the same time as they purchased ones for the Texas Special, so the two trains shared a distinctive look; bright red with corrugated stainless-steel side panels. Frisco bought sets of named cars for each train.

The last day of Meteor service was September 17, 1965. While its itinerary was on an overnight schedule, it was followed by a day train on the same route, the Oklahoman.

== Named cars ==
Named trains frequently had named cars; the Frisco named Meteor cars after cities and rivers. Not all cars may have been named, but the ones that were bore their names prominently on their side panels.

Cars used on the Meteor
Car name	No.	Railroad	Type	Made	Notes
Normandy	251	SLSF	combination baggage, 30 ft (9.1 m) mail	1947	
Valley Park	252	SLSF	baggage, 30 ft mail	1947	
Manchester	1095	SLSF	34-seat coach, dormitory	1947	
Maplewood	1096	SLSF	34-seat coach, dormitory	1947	
Clayton	1253	SLSF	56-seat coach	1947	
Ferguson	1254	SLSF	56-seat coach	1947	
Kirkwood	1255	SLSF	56-seat coach	1947	
Richmond Heights	1256	SLSF	56-seat coach	1947	
University City	1257	SLSF	56-seat coach	1947	
Webster Groves	1258	SLSF	56-seat coach	1947	
Meramec River	1457	SLSF	14 roomette, 4 bedroom sleeper	1947	
Osage River	1458	SLSF	14 roomette, 4 bedroom sleeper	1947	
Gasconade River	1459	SLSF	14 roomette, 4 bedroom sleeper	1947	
Niangua River	1460	SLSF	14 roomette, 4 bedroom sleeper	1947	
James River	1461	SLSF	14 roomette, 4 bedroom sleeper	1947	
Grand River	1462	SLSF	14 roomette, 4 bedroom sleeper	1947	
Canadian River	1463	SLSF	14 roomette, 4 bedroom sleeper	1947	
Neosho River	1464	SLSF	14 roomette, 4 bedroom sleeper	1947	
Spring River	1465	SLSF	14 roomette, 4 bedroom sleeper	1947	
Cimarron River	1466	SLSF	14 roomette, 4 bedroom sleeper	1947	
Tulsa	1550	SLSF	24-seat diner, 18-seat lounge, observation	1947	
Oklahoma City	1551	SLSF	24-seat diner, 18-seat lounge, observation	1947	
Ladue	1651	SLSF	26-seat coach, buffet, 25-seat lounge	1947	
Huntleigh	1652	SLSF	26-seat coach, buffet, 25-seat lounge	1947	

== Models of the Meteor ==
- Hallmark Models, Inc., a model train manufacturer has produced brass E7 diesels and corrugated passenger cars in red and silver without lettering, so that modelers can customize them for either a Meteor or Texas Special train.
