= Germantown, Missouri =

Unincorporated community in Missouri, U.S.

Coordinates: 38°17′24″N 94°01′08″W

Germantown is an unincorporated community in Henry County, in the U.S. state of Missouri.

Germantown was laid out in 1857, and named for the fact a large share of the first settlers were German Catholics.

St. Ludger Catholic Church, which is listed on the National Register of Historic Places, is located in Germantown.
