= Route 66 Historical Village =

Open-air museum in Tulsa, Oklahoma, United States

Coordinates: 36.1083°N 96.0162°W

The Route 66 Historical Village at 3770 Southwest Boulevard in Tulsa, Oklahoma, is an open-air museum along historic U.S. Route 66 (US 66, Route 66). The village includes a 194-foot-tall (59 m) oil derrick at the historic site of the first oil strike in Tulsa on June 25, 1901, which helped make Tulsa the "Oil Capital of the World". In a nod to Route 66, it has the Route 66 Village Station, a tourism information center modeled after a 1920s-1930s gas station, which includes a giant Route 66 map for travelers.

The days of rail transportation are represented by Frisco 4500, an oil-fired 4-8-4 Baldwin locomotive from November 1942 previously owned by the St. Louis–San Francisco Railway. It was used to pull the line's crack Meteor passenger train, which connected Tulsa with other cities. The village's train consist is rounded out with a passenger car, oil tank car, and caboose.

Officials cut the ribbon on the village's new "Red Fork Depot" on October 22, 2021. This is a $3 million addition which serves as both a museum and a rentable events center at the site.
