= C.M. and Vina Clark House =

Historic house in Missouri, United States

- C. M. and Vina Clark House
- U.S. National Register of Historic Places
- Location within Missouri Location within the United States
- Location: 704 California Ave., Montrose, Missouri
- Coordinates: 38°15′41″N 93°59′9″W
- Area: less than one acre
- Built: 1913
- Architect: Multiple
- Architectural style: Late Victorian, Late 19th And 20th Century Revivals
- NRHP reference No.: 96001598
- Added to NRHP: January 16, 1997

C. M. and Vina Clark House, also known as Rosemont and Clark Welling House, is a historic home located at Montrose, Henry County, Missouri. It was built in 1913, and is 1 1/2-story brick and frame dwelling with a combination of Late Victorian and Colonial Revival style design elements.

It was listed on the National Register of Historic Places in 1997.
