= Clinton, Missouri =

City in Missouri, U.S.

- City
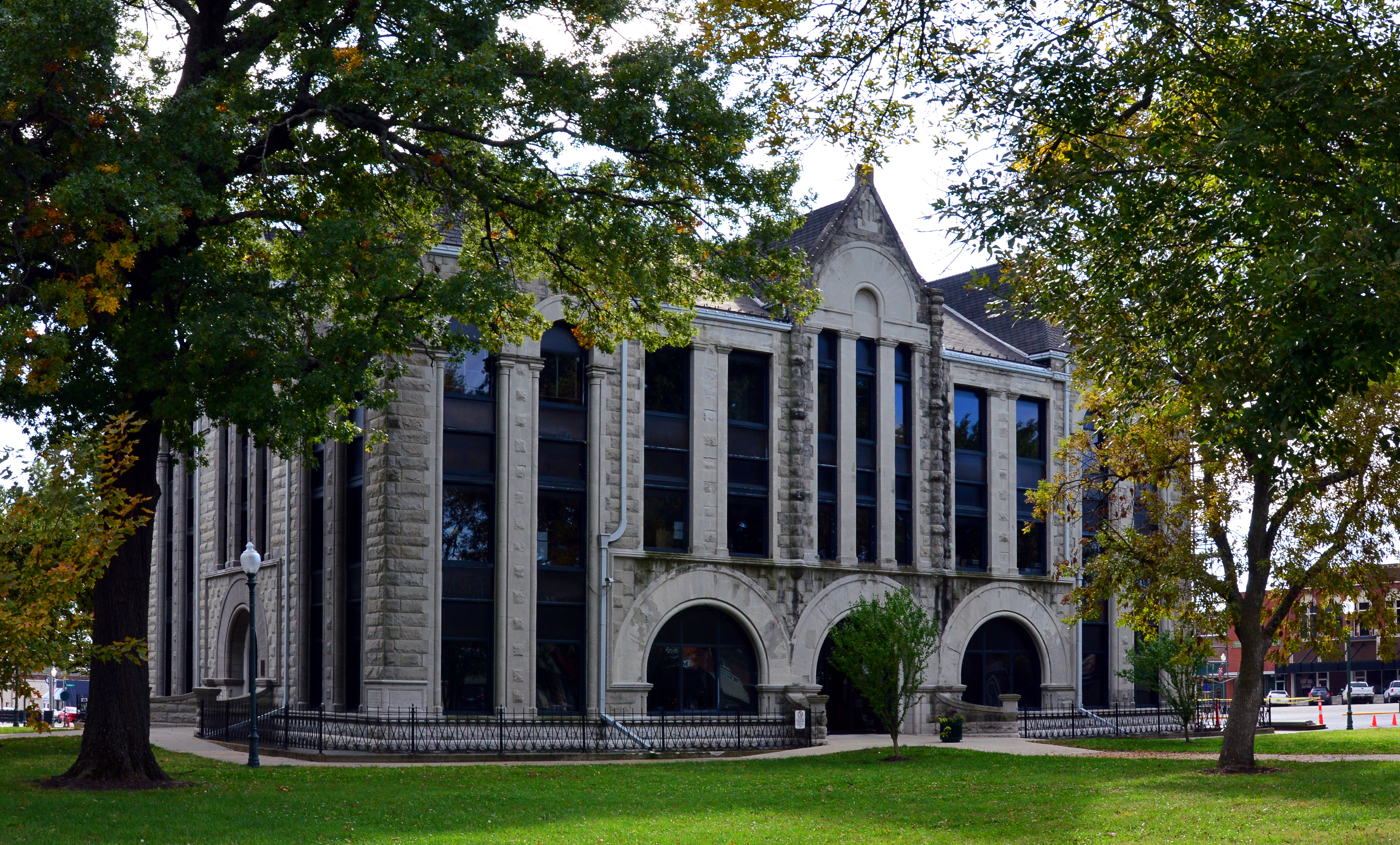
- Henry County Courthouse in Clinton

- Location of Clinton, Missouri
- Coordinates: 38°22′18″N 93°46′18″W
- Country: United States
- State: Missouri
- County: Henry

Area
  - Total: 9.29 sq mi (24.05 km^{2})
  - Land: 9.17 sq mi (23.75 km^{2})
  - Water: 0.12 sq mi (0.30 km^{2})
- Elevation: 797 ft (243 m)

Population (2020)
  - Total: 9,174
  - Density: 1,000.4/sq mi (386.25/km^{2})
- Time zone: UTC-6 (Central (CST))
  - Summer (DST): UTC-5 (CDT)
- ZIP Code: 64735
- Area code: 660
- FIPS code: 29-14986
- GNIS feature ID: 2393570
- Website: clintonmo.com

Clinton is a city in and the county seat of Henry County, Missouri, United States. The population was 9,174 at the 2020 census.

== History ==
Clinton was laid out in 1836. The city was named for New York governor DeWitt Clinton, a key promoter of the Erie Canal. A post office called Clinton has been in operation since 1850. The railroad reached Clinton in 1870, when the census put the population at 840.

Clinton was incorporated as the least-populous type of city in Missouri, a fourth-class city, in 1878. All but one voter voted in favor of incorporation. Resident Banton G. Boone, a Democrat, was speaker of the Missouri House of Representatives, 1875–1877, and Missouri attorney general, 1885–1889.

Piped water, electricity, and macadam roads were brought in during the 1880s, and a telephone system in the 1890s.

In 1905, Clinton and the rest of Henry County held two separate votes on prohibition of alcohol. Clinton's vote was against prohibition, while the rest of the county voted in favor, creating two separate legal regimes. In 1909, another such local option vote in Clinton gave the same result, against prohibition.

The town square, the focal point of the Clinton Square Historic District, has been the site of various disasters. In 1876, a fire burned down a number of buildings on the square. The cause is believed to have been arson. On June 26, 2006, a building there collapsed while an Elks Lodge meeting was taking place, leading to the death of the Lodge's leader, Tony Komer. Nine people were pulled from the rubble, while the rest left on their own power. In the Olde Glory Days parade, which occurred less than one week after the accident, Komer was memorialized and Elk's Lodge members from many parts of Western Missouri marched to show their support for the Clinton Lodge.

In addition to the Historic District overall, the Anheuser-Busch Brewing Association Building, William F. and Julia Crome House, Judge Jerubial Gideon Dorman House, Gustave C. Haysler House, and C.C. Williams House are listed on the National Register of Historic Places.

== Geography ==
According to the United States Census Bureau, the city has a total area of 9.26 square miles (23.98 km^{2}), of which 9.14 square miles (23.67 km^{2}) is land and 0.12 square miles (0.31 km^{2}) is water.

The downtown square serves as a center for community commerce and public affairs. Several state highways intersect at Clinton, including Routes 13 and 7, making Clinton a popular stop on the Springfield-Kansas City Route.

=== Climate ===
Climate data for Clinton, Missouri (1991–2020 normals, extremes 1906–present)
Month	Jan	Feb	Mar	Apr	May	Jun	Jul	Aug	Sep	Oct	Nov	Dec	Year
Record high °F (°C)	78 (26)	83 (28)	93 (34)	96 (36)	105 (41)	111 (44)	118 (48)	116 (47)	108 (42)	97 (36)	87 (31)	77 (25)	118 (48)
Mean maximum °F (°C)	64.4 (18.0)	70.2 (21.2)	78.3 (25.7)	83.9 (28.8)	88.5 (31.4)	93.4 (34.1)	98.4 (36.9)	98.4 (36.9)	93.5 (34.2)	85.9 (29.9)	74.5 (23.6)	66.0 (18.9)	100.3 (37.9)
Mean daily maximum °F (°C)	40.9 (4.9)	46.4 (8.0)	57.0 (13.9)	66.9 (19.4)	76.1 (24.5)	84.9 (29.4)	89.5 (31.9)	88.8 (31.6)	80.8 (27.1)	69.3 (20.7)	56.0 (13.3)	44.7 (7.1)	66.8 (19.3)
Daily mean °F (°C)	30.2 (−1.0)	34.9 (1.6)	44.8 (7.1)	54.8 (12.7)	64.9 (18.3)	74.4 (23.6)	78.5 (25.8)	77.1 (25.1)	68.6 (20.3)	56.7 (13.7)	44.7 (7.1)	34.3 (1.3)	55.3 (12.9)
Mean daily minimum °F (°C)	19.4 (−7.0)	23.3 (−4.8)	32.7 (0.4)	42.8 (6.0)	53.8 (12.1)	63.8 (17.7)	67.4 (19.7)	65.4 (18.6)	56.4 (13.6)	44.1 (6.7)	33.4 (0.8)	23.9 (−4.5)	43.9 (6.6)
Mean minimum °F (°C)	−0.2 (−17.9)	4.2 (−15.4)	14.3 (−9.8)	26.6 (−3.0)	37.9 (3.3)	50.7 (10.4)	57.2 (14.0)	54.8 (12.7)	40.4 (4.7)	27.8 (−2.3)	16.4 (−8.7)	5.5 (−14.7)	−4.9 (−20.5)
Record low °F (°C)	−22 (−30)	−22 (−30)	−12 (−24)	10 (−12)	27 (−3)	40 (4)	45 (7)	42 (6)	29 (−2)	15 (−9)	0 (−18)	−31 (−35)	−31 (−35)
Average precipitation inches (mm)	1.74 (44)	2.15 (55)	3.16 (80)	4.58 (116)	5.66 (144)	5.07 (129)	3.93 (100)	4.03 (102)	4.32 (110)	3.29 (84)	3.05 (77)	2.35 (60)	43.33 (1,101)
Average snowfall inches (cm)	4.6 (12)	2.1 (5.3)	2.0 (5.1)	0.1 (0.25)	0.0 (0.0)	0.0 (0.0)	0.0 (0.0)	0.0 (0.0)	0.0 (0.0)	0.0 (0.0)	0.3 (0.76)	2.0 (5.1)	11.1 (28)
Average precipitation days (≥ 0.01 in)	6.2	6.3	9.5	11.1	12.1	9.7	8.3	7.8	7.9	9.1	7.4	6.7	102.1
Average snowy days (≥ 0.1 in)	2.4	1.6	0.9	0.2	0.0	0.0	0.0	0.0	0.0	0.0	0.4	1.4	6.9
Source: NOAA

== Demographics ==
Historical population
Census	Pop.	Note	%±
1870	610		—
1880	2,868		370.2%
1890	4,737		65.2%
1900	5,061		6.8%
1910	4,992		−1.4%
1920	5,098		2.1%
1930	5,744		12.7%
1940	6,041		5.2%
1950	6,075		0.6%
1960	6,925		14.0%
1970	7,504		8.4%
1980	8,366		11.5%
1990	8,703		4.0%
2000	9,311		7.0%
2010	9,008		−3.3%
2020	9,174		1.8%
U.S. Decennial Census

=== 2020 census ===
As of the 2020 census, Clinton had a population of 9,174. The median age was 42.5 years. 22.2% of residents were under the age of 18 and 24.2% were 65 years of age or older. For every 100 females there were 88.6 males, and for every 100 females age 18 and over there were 85.0 males.

96.5% of residents lived in urban areas, while 3.5% lived in rural areas.

There were 4,017 households in Clinton, of which 25.3% had children under the age of 18 living in them. Of all households, 36.9% were married-couple households, 19.9% were households with a male householder and no spouse or partner present, and 34.6% were households with a female householder and no spouse or partner present. About 38.6% of all households were made up of individuals, and 18.7% had someone living alone who was 65 years of age or older.

There were 4,519 housing units, of which 11.1% were vacant. The homeowner vacancy rate was 3.1% and the rental vacancy rate was 8.9%.

Racial composition as of the 2020 census
Race	Number	Percent
White	8,132	88.6%
Black or African American	144	1.6%
American Indian and Alaska Native	48	0.5%
Asian	58	0.6%
Native Hawaiian and Other Pacific Islander	3	0.0%
Some other race	118	1.3%
Two or more races	671	7.3%
Hispanic or Latino (of any race)	295	3.2%

=== Income and poverty ===
The 2016–2020 5-year American Community Survey estimates show that the median household income was $39,883 (with a margin of error of +/− $10,729) and the median family income was $52,125 (+/− $7,907). Males had a median income of $27,500 (+/− $9,545) versus $20,746 (+/− $5,380) for females. The median income for those above 16 years old was $23,494 (+/− $3,815). Approximately, 16.0% of families and 22.8% of the population were below the poverty line, including 33.1% of those under the age of 18 and 13.3% of those ages 65 or over.

=== 2010 census ===
At the 2010 census there were 9,008 people, 3,935 households, and 2,371 families living in the city. The population density was 985.6 inhabitants per square mile (380.5/km^{2}). There were 4,454 housing units at an average density of 487.3 per square mile (188.1/km^{2}). The racial makup of the city was 95.1% White, 1.9% African American, 0.4% Native American, 0.3% Asian, 0.5% from other races, and 1.8% from two or more races. Hispanic or Latino of any race were 2.0%.

Of the 3,935 households 27.9% had children under the age of 18 living with them, 42.2% were married couples living together, 13.3% had a female householder with no husband present, 4.8% had a male householder with no wife present, and 39.7% were non-families. 34.5% of households were one person and 16.1% were one person aged 65 or older. The average household size was 2.24 and the average family size was 2.82.

The median age was 40.6 years. 22.6% of residents were under the age of 18; 8.5% were between the ages of 18 and 24; 23.4% were from 25 to 44; 25.1% were from 45 to 64; and 20.5% were 65 or older. The gender makeup of the city was 46.9% male and 53.1% female.

=== 2000 census ===
At the 2000 census there were 9,311 people, 3,978 households, and 2,502 families living in the city. The population density was 1,007.6 inhabitants per square mile (389.0/km^{2}). There were 4,342 housing units at an average density of 469.9 per square mile (181.4/km^{2}). The racial makup of the city was 95.49% White, 1.77% African American, 0.92% Native American, 0.31% Asian, 0.50% from other races, and 1.00% from two or more races. Hispanic or Latino of any race were 1.03%.

Of the 3,978 households 27.8% had children under the age of 18 living with them, 47.0% were married couples living together, 12.1% had a female householder with no husband present, and 37.1% were non-families. 33.1% of households were one person and 16.3% were one person aged 65 or older. The average household size was 2.26 and the average family size was 2.84.

The age distribution was 23.4% under the age of 18, 8.8% from 18 to 24, 25.6% from 25 to 44, 21.2% from 45 to 64, and 20.9% 65 or older. The median age was 39 years. For every 100 females, there were 88.4 males. For every 100 females age 18 and over, there were 82.7 males.

The median household income was $28,079 and the median family income was $32,378. Males had a median income of $26,834 versus $19,096 for females. The per capita income for the city was $16,282. About 11.9% of families and 15.5% of the population were below the poverty line, including 21.0% of those under age 18 and 13.3% of those age 65 or over.

== Education ==
Clinton School District operates five schools, including Clinton High School.

Clinton has a public library, a branch of the Henry County Library.

== Arts and culture ==
On September 12, 2007, the Tour of Missouri bicycle race began stage 2 from Clinton. The initial take off began from the historic downtown square, and ended in Springfield.

Clinton lies at the western terminus of the Katy Trail, a 225-mile long state park used by cyclists, runners and horseback riders. The rail trail is built on the path of the old Missouri-Kansas-Texas Railroad, which was abandoned between Clinton and Sedalia in 1989. The former Katy railroad from Clinton south to Nevada is still operated by the Missouri and Northern Arkansas Railroad (Genesee & Wyoming). The city is also situated near Truman Lake, which is widely known for its excellent boating, fishing, camping, and other related activities. Clinton is also home to two of the area's 18-hole golf courses.

Clinton is home to two radio stations: KDKD-FM, which plays country music and KXEA, which plays hot adult contemporary music. KDKD-AM, Clinton's oldest radio station that first went on-air May 11, 1951, specialized in agricultural programming and ceased operations on December 31, 2021. The stations returned to local ownership in 2018 after Clayton and Brittany Radford founded Radford Media Group LLC and purchased the three stations from Portland-based broadcasting company Alpha Media for $250,000. The transmitter for KXEA is located in Lowry City, Missouri, however, the two stations are operated under the same roof in Clinton.

== Transportation ==
Intercity bus service to the city is provided by Jefferson Lines.

== Notable people ==
- Virgil Hill, Olympic boxing silver medalist, member of International Boxing Hall of Fame
- Uel W. Lamkin, Henry County schools superintendent and president of Northwest Missouri State University
- Steve Luebber, MLB pitcher and Minor League baseball pitching coach
- Nick Petree, Minor League baseball player
- Delbert Lee Scott, politician, college president
- David Steward, World Wide Technology founder, chairman

== See also ==
- List of cities in Missouri
