= St. Ludger Catholic Church =

Historic church in Missouri, United States

- U.S. National Register of Historic Places
- Location within Missouri Location within the United States
- Nearest city: Montrose, Missouri
- Coordinates: 38°17′26″N 94°1′13″W
- Area: 2.6 acres (1.1 ha)
- Built: 1926-1927, 1942
- Architect: Henry Brinkman; August Meier
- Architectural style: Romanesque
- NRHP reference No.: 98000365
- Added to NRHP: April 13, 1998

St. Ludger Catholic Church is a historic Roman Catholic parish church in Germantown, Henry County, Missouri.

The earliest parish record is from December 1832, when Dekon Tiof baptized John Freyrik, but the community was not assigned a permanent parish priest until 1840, when Joseph Rosati, the Bishop of St. Louis, named Henry Meinkmann as pastor. In the early days, the parish built a log church. This was replaced with another in 1842, and then by a permanent church in 1858. The church was named for Saint Ludger, first Bishop of Münster, as many families who settled in the area originated in Westphalia.

In August 1874, a Rocky Mountain locust plague struck large swathes of the Midwest, destroying the wheat, oats, and corn sown in May. According to Germantown and St. Ludger’s, 1833-2002, a history by Donna (Koch) Talbott, nearby farmers rushed to the church and “made a solemn promise before the Blessed Sacrament to keep May 1 holy if they would be averted from this plague.” The grasshoppers departed after the prayer service, and for the next 115 years, the parish held a public adoration of the Blessed Sacrament on May 1.

The current variegated red brick Romanesque Revival-style church building was completed in 1927. It sits on a concrete foundation and has a 60 foot tall bell tower. Also on the property is the contributing brick rectory constructed in 1942. It was listed on the National Register of Historic Places in 1998.

In 1990, the parish was suppressed and became a mission church of Immaculate Conception Parish in Montrose. The May 1 celebration was changed to an evening Mass, now held on the closest Saturday to May 1 and followed by a procession around the church and blessing of crops and farmlands with holy water.
