= William F. and Julia Crome House =

Historic house in Missouri, United States

- U.S. National Register of Historic Places
- Location within Missouri Location within the United States
- Location: 305 S. Second Street, Clinton, Missouri
- Coordinates: 38°22′3″N 93°46′27″W
- Area: less than one acre
- Built: 1904
- Architect: Traber, Oliver R.S.
- Architectural style: Colonial Revival, Foursquare
- NRHP reference No.: 99000380
- Added to NRHP: March 25, 1999

The William F. and Julia Crome House is a historic house located at 305 South Second Street in Clinton, Henry County, Missouri.

== Description and history ==
It was built in 1904, and is two-story, American Foursquare style brick dwelling with Colonial Revival style design elements. It has an intersecting hip roof with five dormers and a full-width front porch. Also on the property is a contributing brick garage.

It was listed on the National Register of Historic Places on March 25, 1999.
