= Montrose, Missouri =

City in Henry County, Missouri, United States

- City
- Location of Montrose, Missouri
- Coordinates: 38°15′31″N 93°58′58″W
- Country: United States
- State: Missouri
- County: Henry
- Incorporated: 1871

Area
  - Total: 0.57 sq mi (1.48 km^{2})
  - Land: 0.57 sq mi (1.48 km^{2})
  - Water: 0.0039 sq mi (0.01 km^{2})
- Elevation: 837 ft (255 m)

Population (2020)
  - Total: 383
  - Density: 671.8/sq mi (259.38/km^{2})
- Time zone: UTC-6 (Central (CST))
  - Summer (DST): UTC-5 (CDT)
- ZIP code: 64770
- Area code: 660
- FIPS code: 29-49664
- GNIS feature ID: 2395391

Montrose is a city in Henry County, Missouri, United States. As of the 2020 census, Montrose had a population of 383.

== History ==
Montrose was founded in 1871, spurred by the building of the railroad through that territory. The town was named after Montrose, in Scotland. A post office called Montrose has been in operation since 1870.

Among the early industries represented in the newly incorporated town were a flour mill, a grain elevator, several grain warehouses, a bank, two hotels, two hardware and implement stores, two furniture stores, three dry goods stores, four blacksmiths, two barber shops, three millinery shops, two newspapers, and a livery stable.

The Montrose Savings Bank was organized June 4, 1895 and began operating the following day. The first directors were R.H. Dugan, E.W. Blew, O.P. Wilson, Henry Welling, Nick Erhart, Joseph DeBold and W.S. Winkler.

The C.M. and Vina Clark House and St. Ludger Catholic Church are listed on the National Register of Historic Places.

== Geography ==
According to the United States Census Bureau, the city has a total area of 0.57 square miles (1.48 km^{2}), all land.

== Demographics ==
Historical population
Census	Pop.	Note	%±
1880	495		—
1890	644		30.1%
1900	613		−4.8%
1910	667		8.8%
1920	715		7.2%
1930	531		−25.7%
1940	487		−8.3%
1950	518		6.4%
1960	526		1.5%
1970	531		1.0%
1980	498		−6.2%
1990	440		−11.6%
2000	417		−5.2%
2010	384		−7.9%
2020	383		−0.3%
U.S. Decennial Census

=== 2010 census ===
As of the census of 2010, there were 384 people, 192 households, and 101 families living in the city. The population density was 673.7 inhabitants per square mile (260.1/km^{2}). There were 224 housing units at an average density of 393.0 per square mile (151.7/km^{2}). The racial makeup of the city was 98.2% White, 1.3% African American, and 0.5% from two or more races. Hispanic or Latino of any race were 0.8% of the population.

There were 192 households, of which 19.3% had children under the age of 18 living with them, 36.5% were married couples living together, 13.5% had a female householder with no husband present, 2.6% had a male householder with no wife present, and 47.4% were non-families. 43.2% of all households were made up of individuals, and 21.4% had someone living alone who was 65 years of age or older. The average household size was 2.00 and the average family size was 2.68.

The median age in the city was 47.7 years. 18% of residents were under the age of 18; 6.2% were between the ages of 18 and 24; 21.6% were from 25 to 44; 31.8% were from 45 to 64; and 22.4% were 65 years of age or older. The gender makeup of the city was 46.9% male and 53.1% female.

=== 2000 census ===
As of the census of 2000, there were 417 people, 199 households, and 111 families living in the city. The population density was 726.4 inhabitants per square mile (280.5/km^{2}). There were 219 housing units at an average density of 381.5 per square mile (147.3/km^{2}). The racial makeup of the city was 98.80% White, 0.48% Native American, 0.24% Asian, and 0.48% from two or more races.

There were 199 households, out of which 24.6% had children under the age of 18 living with them, 43.2% were married couples living together, 9.0% had a female householder with no husband present, and 44.2% were non-families. 39.7% of all households were made up of individuals, and 17.1% had someone living alone who was 65 years of age or older. The average household size was 2.10 and the average family size was 2.77.

In the city the population was spread out, with 22.1% under the age of 18, 7.4% from 18 to 24, 25.7% from 25 to 44, 21.3% from 45 to 64, and 23.5% who were 65 years of age or older. The median age was 42 years. For every 100 females, there were 103.4 males. For every 100 females age 18 and over, there were 95.8 males.

The median income for a household in the city was $21,563, and the median income for a family was $32,500. Males had a median income of $26,667 versus $18,125 for females. The per capita income for the city was $15,062. About 14.0% of families and 16.8% of the population were below the poverty line, including 25.4% of those under age 18 and 13.3% of those age 65 or over.

== Notable events ==
- In 2010, Montrose High School won the Missouri Class 1 Girls Basketball State Championship.
- In 2011, Montrose High School finished 3rd in the Missouri Class 1 Girls Basketball State Championship.

== See also ==
- List of cities in Missouri
