= Anheuser-Busch Brewing Association Building =

- U.S. National Register of Historic Places
- U.S. Historic district – Contributing property
- Location within Missouri Location within the United States
- Location: 203 W. Franklin St., Clinton, Missouri
- Coordinates: 38°22′15″N 93°46′41″W
- Area: less than one acre
- Built: 1886
- Built by: Kratz, Henry A.
- Architect: Jungenfeld, E.
- Architectural style: Romanesque
- NRHP reference No.: 91001030
- Added to NRHP: August 9, 1991

Anheuser-Busch Brewing Association Building, also known as the Lobaugh Building and Henry County Museum and Cultural Arts Center, is a historic Anheuser-Busch distribution building located at Clinton, Henry County, Missouri. It was built in 1886, and is one- to two-story, Romanesque Revival style timber frame building with brick load bearing walls. It sits on a limestone foundation. It features a dramatic three stepped parapet wall topped with limestone caps, decorative ornaments, Eselohren (mule ears), bands of voussoir trimmed windows, and semicircular arched windows. It housed Anheuser-Busch operations until 1920, after which it housed a feed and produce business, and later a local history museum.

It was listed on the National Register of Historic Places in 1991. It is located in the Clinton Square Historic District.
