= Clinton Square Historic District =

Historic district in Missouri, United States

- U.S. National Register of Historic Places
- U.S. Historic district
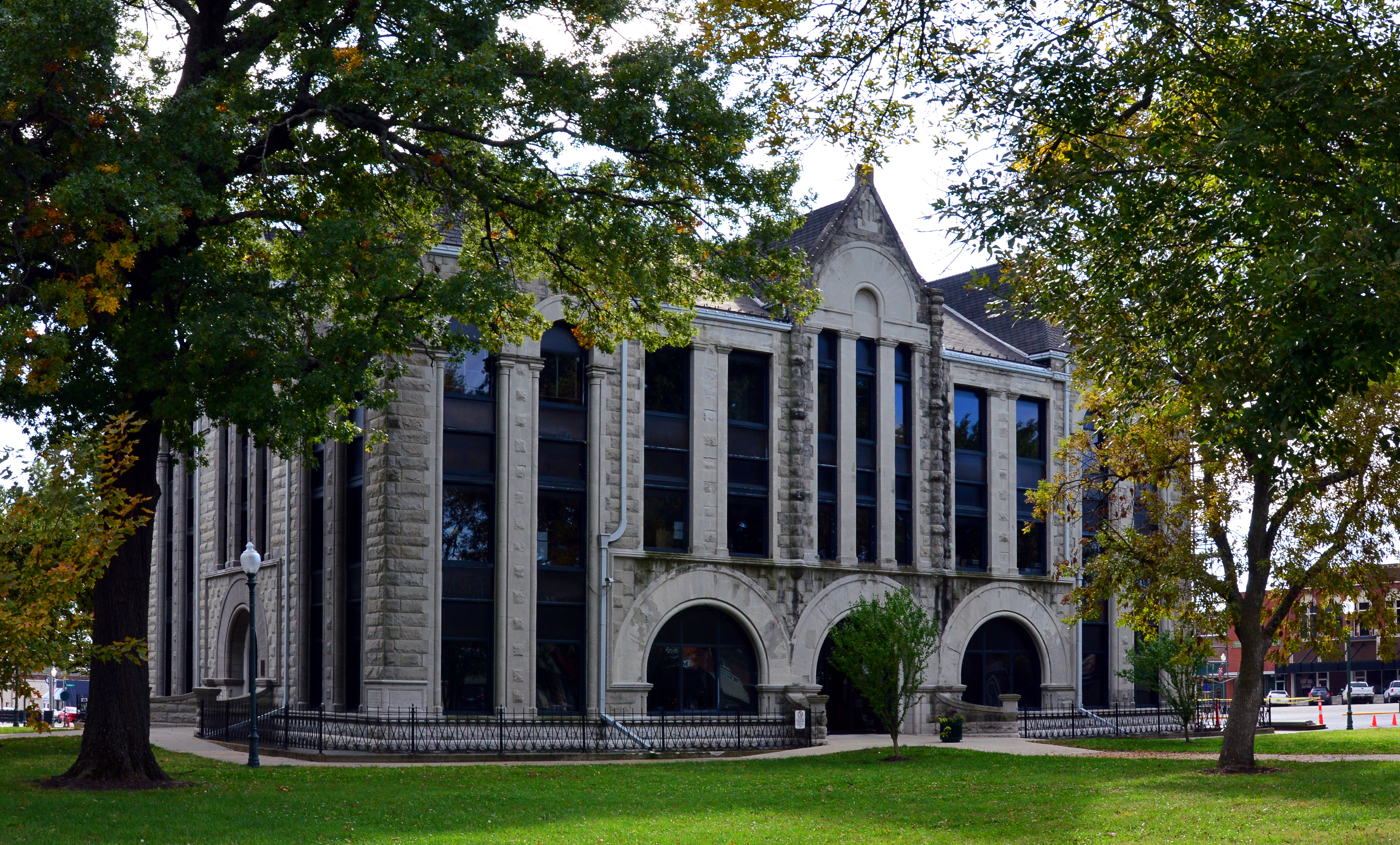

- Location within Missouri Location within the United States
- Location: Roughly 100 Blocks on N & S Main; S. Washington; W Franklin; W Jefferson, Clinton, Missouri
- Coordinates: 38°22′13″N 93°46′36″W
- Area: 15.9 acres (6.4 ha)
- Architectural style: Italianate, Late 19th And 20th Century Revivals
- NRHP reference No.: 07000019
- Added to NRHP: February 7, 2007

Clinton Square Historic District is a national historic district located at Clinton, Henry County, Missouri. The district encompasses 62 contributing buildings, 1 contributing structure, and 1 contributing object in the central business district of Clinton. It developed between about 1885 and 1957 and includes representative examples of Italianate and Romanesque Revival style architecture. Located in the district is the separately listed Anheuser-Busch Brewing Association Building. Other notable buildings include the Fristoes Body Shop Office (c. 1905), Whitehead Consultants (c. 1905), Texas Room / Pit Stop Pub (c. 1890, 1940), State Farm Insurance (c. 1876), Montgomery Ward (1940s), J.C. Penney / Brownsbergers / Eberting's Main Street Central (c. 1890s, 1940), Old City Hall (1891), Delozier Building (1887), Crest Cinema (c. 1950), Henry County Courthouse (c. 1893), and the Bandstand on Courthouse Square (c. 1921).

It was listed on the National Register of Historic Places in 2007.
