= C.C. Williams House =

Historic house in Missouri, United States

- C. C. Williams House
- U.S. National Register of Historic Places
- Location within Missouri Location within the United States
- Location: 303 W. Franklin St., Clinton, Missouri
- Coordinates: 38°22′16″N 93°46′46″W
- Area: 0.2 acres (0.081 ha)
- Built: c. 1867
- Architectural style: Italianate
- NRHP reference No.: 82000584
- Added to NRHP: October 21, 1982

C. C. Williams House, also known as the Biddlecomb House and Cummings Apartment House, is a historic home located at Clinton, Henry County, Missouri. It was built about 1867, and is two-story, T-shaped, Italianate style frame dwelling. It sits on a sandstone foundation with southern mansion front and hipped cross-gable roof.

It was listed on the National Register of Historic Places in 1995.
