= Judge Jerubial Gideon Dorman House =

Historic house in Missouri, United States

- U.S. National Register of Historic Places
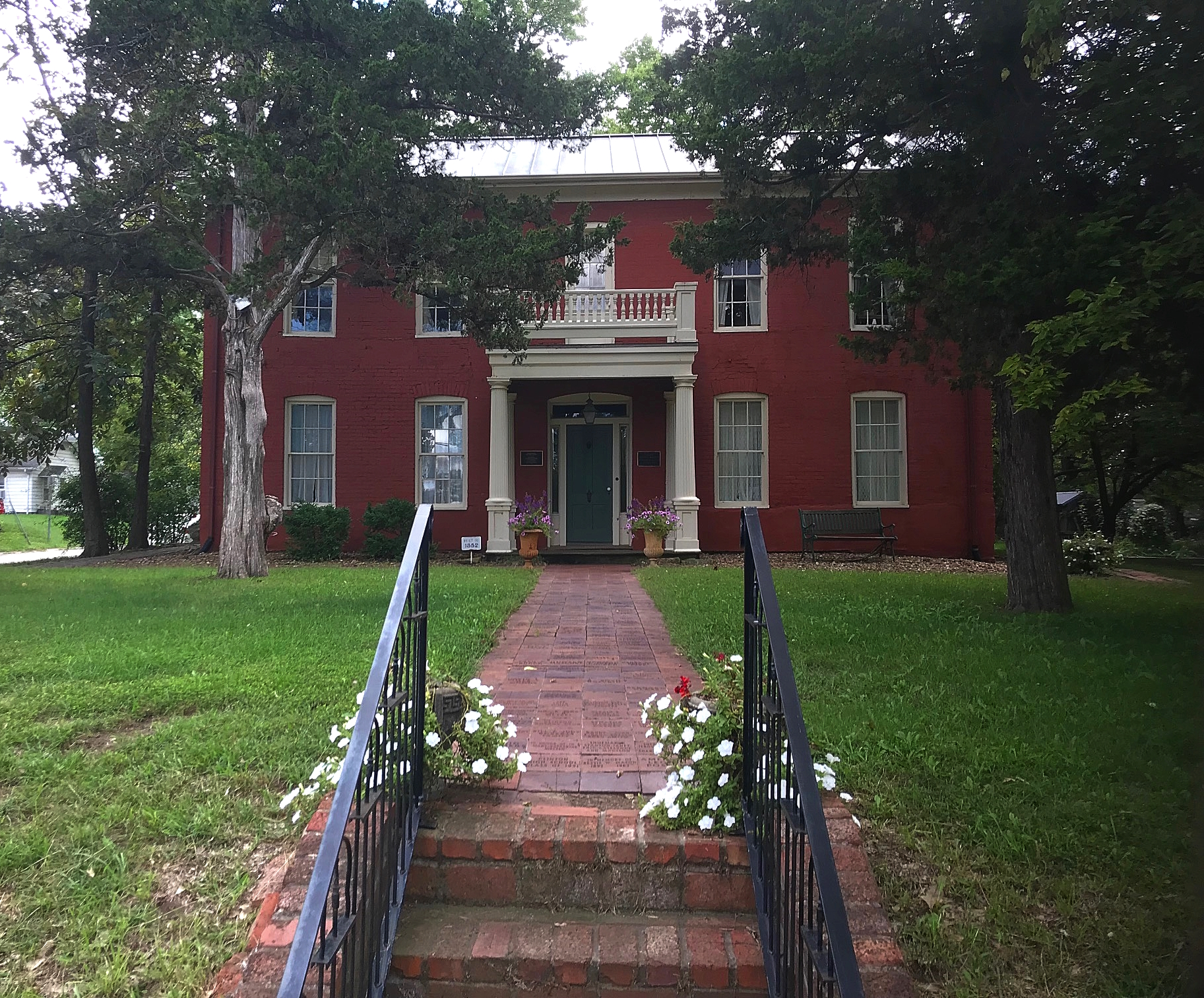

- Location within Missouri Location within the United States
- Location: 302 W. Franklin St., Clinton, Missouri
- Coordinates: 38°22′14″N 93°46′47″W
- Area: less than one acre
- Built: 1852
- Architectural style: Greek Revival, Gothic
- NRHP reference No.: 83000992
- Added to NRHP: February 10, 1983

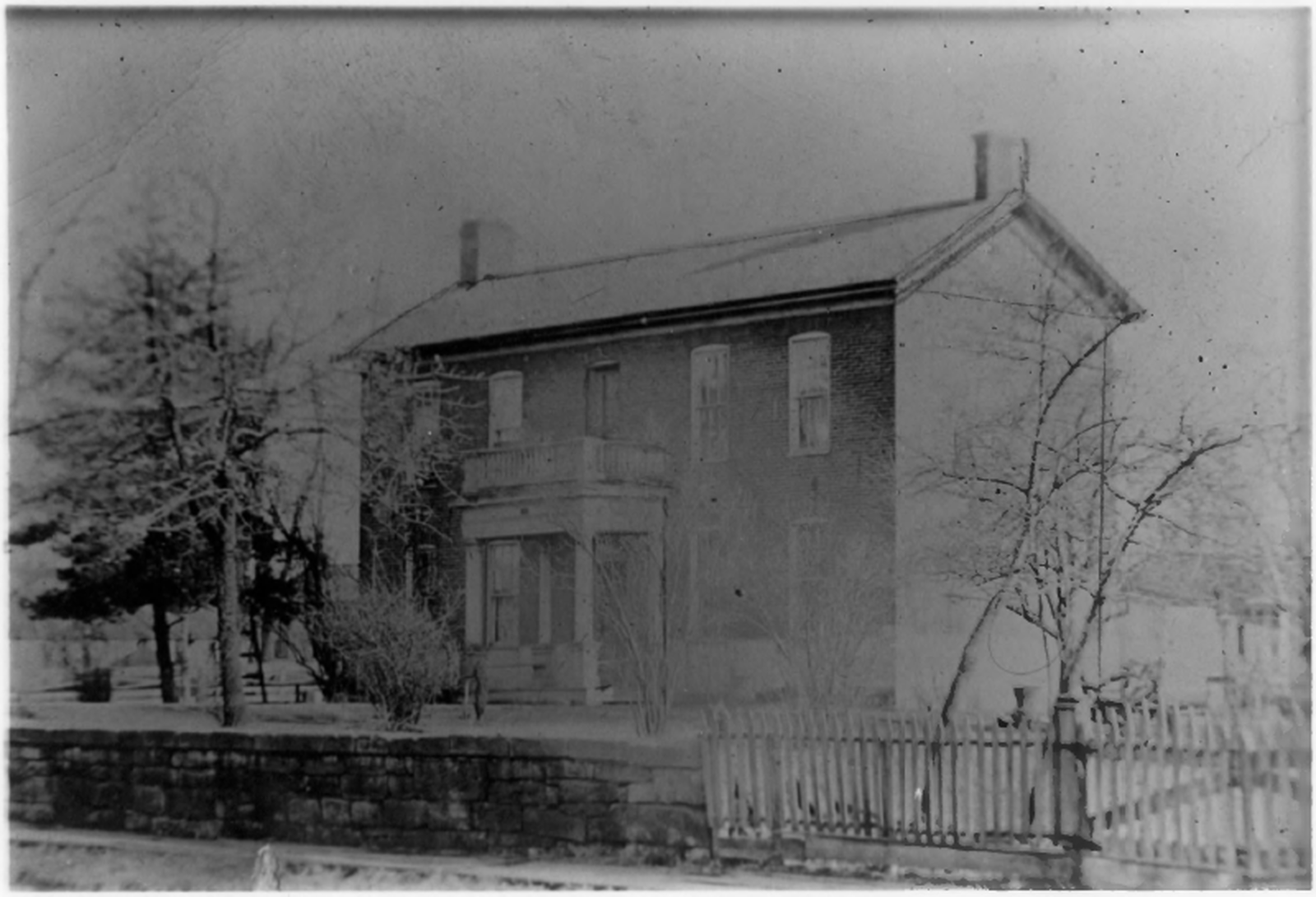
A historical photo of the Dorman House in Clinton, Missouri.

Judge Jerubial Gideon Dorman House, also known as the Dorman House, is a historic home located at Clinton, Henry County, Missouri. It was built in 1852, and is two-story, central passage plan, brick I-house with Greek Revival and Gothic Revival style design elements. It has a side gable roof and a small Greek Revival porch.

It was listed on the National Register of Historic Places in 1983.
