= Gustave C. Haysler House =

Historic house in Missouri, United States

- U.S. National Register of Historic Places
- Location within Missouri Location within the United States
- Location: 301 S. Second St., Clinton, Missouri
- Coordinates: 38°22′4″N 93°46′27″W
- Area: less than one acre
- Built: c. 1896
- Architectural style: Queen Anne
- NRHP reference No.: 95000859
- Added to NRHP: July 21, 1995

Gustave C. Haysler House is a historic home located at Clinton, Henry County, Missouri. It was built about 1896, and is two-story, Queen Anne style frame dwelling. It features steep hipped roofs, front porch with classical columns, and a cylindrical tower.

It was listed on the National Register of Historic Places in 1995.
