= KXEA =

- Lowry City, Missouri; United States
- Broadcast area: West Central Missouri
- Frequency: 104.9 MHz
- Branding: 104.9 The Bizz

Programming
- Language: English
- Format: Hot adult contemporary

Ownership
- Owner: Clayton and Brittany Radford; (Radford Media Group, LLC)
- Sister stations: KDKD-FM

History
- First air date: 2010
- Call sign meaning: K X EAgle (former branding)

Technical information
- Licensing authority: FCC
- Facility ID: 170999
- Class: A
- ERP: 1,100 watts
- HAAT: 127 meters (417 ft)
- Transmitter coordinates: 38°09′08″N 93°39′43″W

Links
- Public license information: Public file; LMS
- Webcast: Listen Live
- Website: thebizzfm.com

KXEA (104.9 FM, "104.9 The Bizz") is an American radio station licensed to serve Lowry City, Missouri, United States. The station is owned by Clayton and Brittany Radford and the broadcast license is held by Radford Media Group, LLC.

KXEA broadcasts a hot adult contemporary format to the west-central Missouri area.

The station was assigned the call sign KXEA by the Federal Communications Commission (FCC) on February 25, 2010.

On December 30, 2018, KXEA rebranded as "Rock 104.9".

On January 1, 2023, KXEA changed its format from classic rock to hot adult contemporary, branded as "104.9 The Bizz".

== Previous logo ==
(KXEA's logo under former classic hits format)
