= Texas Special =

Named passenger train

- The Heralds of the Katy and the Frisco as they appeared on Texas Special Locomotives

Overview
- Service type: Inter-city rail
- Status: Discontinued
- Locale: Midwestern United States/Southwestern United States
- First service: 1915
- Last service: July 1, 1965

Route
- Termini: St. Louis, Missouri; San Antonio, Texas
- Distance travelled: 1,038.6 miles (1,671.5 km)
- Train number: 97; 98

Technical
- Track owners: Missouri Kansas Texas Railroad; St. Louis-San Francisco Railway

The Texas Special was a named passenger train operated jointly by the Missouri–Kansas–Texas Railroad (also known as the MKT or the Katy) and the St. Louis–San Francisco Railway (the Frisco). It was the flagship of both these lines, operating between St. Louis, Missouri, and San Antonio, Texas, from 1915 until 1959, after which time the Katy changed the northern destination from St Louis to Kansas City after the Frisco discontinued service from St. Louis.

== History ==
=== Steam Era ===
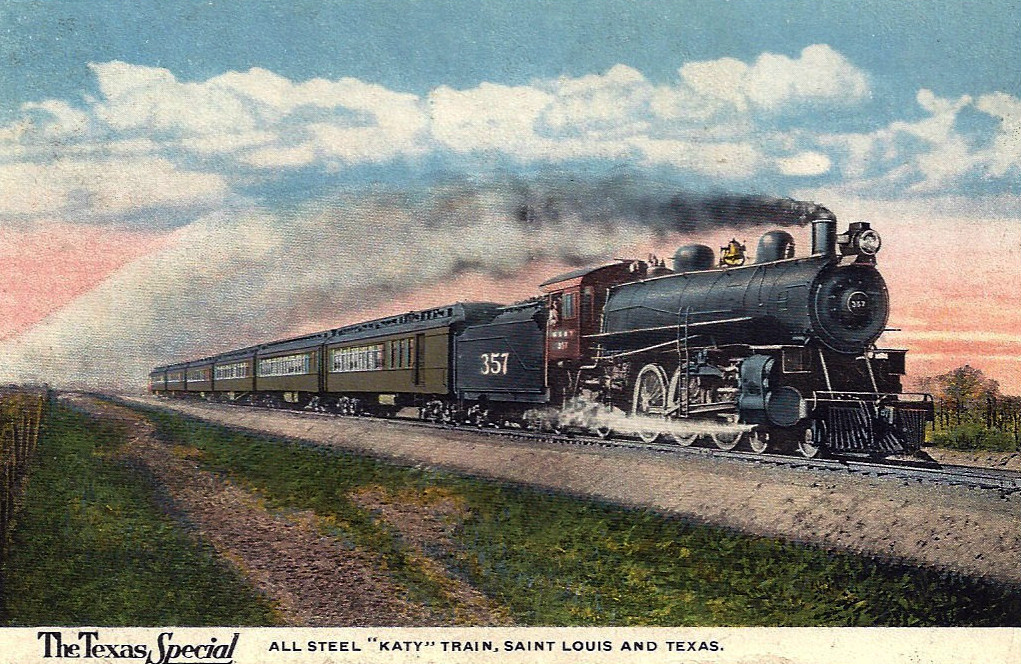
Postcard of the train from 1919.

In 1915 the Katy began operating the Texas Special from St. Louis to San Antonio via North Jefferson City, Missouri; Parsons, Kansas; McAlester, Oklahoma; Dallas, Fort Worth, and Austin, Texas. This was done to augment the existing Katy Flyer and Katy Limited trains.

Effective March 4, 1917, the Texas Special operated over Frisco line from St. Louis through Springfield, Missouri, to Vinita, Oklahoma, where it met Katy lines. When the Texas Special changed lines in Vinita, it changed crews as well. In the early days of joint operations, down the Katy line in Muskogee, Oklahoma, the locomotive was changed also.

The M-K-T began splitting the train at Denison, Texas, with one section serving Dallas, Austin and San Antonio, and the other serving Ft. Worth and continuing over their roundabout route to Houston. Through Houston service, which was much slower than the Missouri Pacific Railroad's service from St. Louis, was discontinued in the mid 1950s, though a Ft. Worth section continued to split cars out at Denison.

The joint operation created one of the shortest routes connecting Texas financial centers with those in the East. In light of this success the two railroads inaugurated a second train, named the Bluebonnet on December 11, 1927; it operated until May 1, 1948, serving the same route, but terminating in the Dallas/Ft. Worth area.

Through World War II the Texas Special consisted of "heavyweight" passenger cars pulled by Katy Pacific 4-6-2s, Frisco Northern 4-8-4s, or Frisco Mountain 4-8-2s.

=== Streamlined Diesel ===
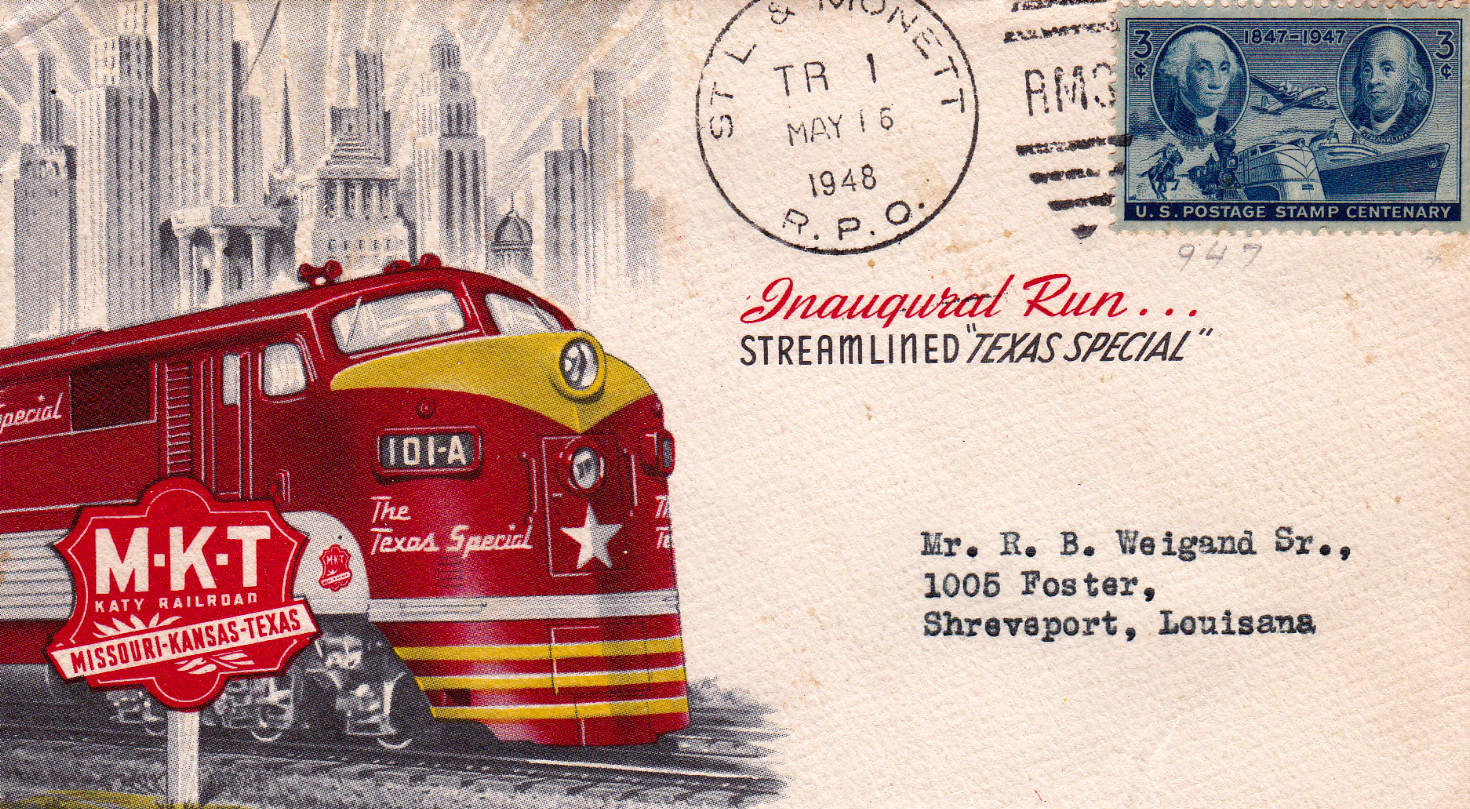
Postcard from the 1948 inaugural run of the streamlined Texas Special.

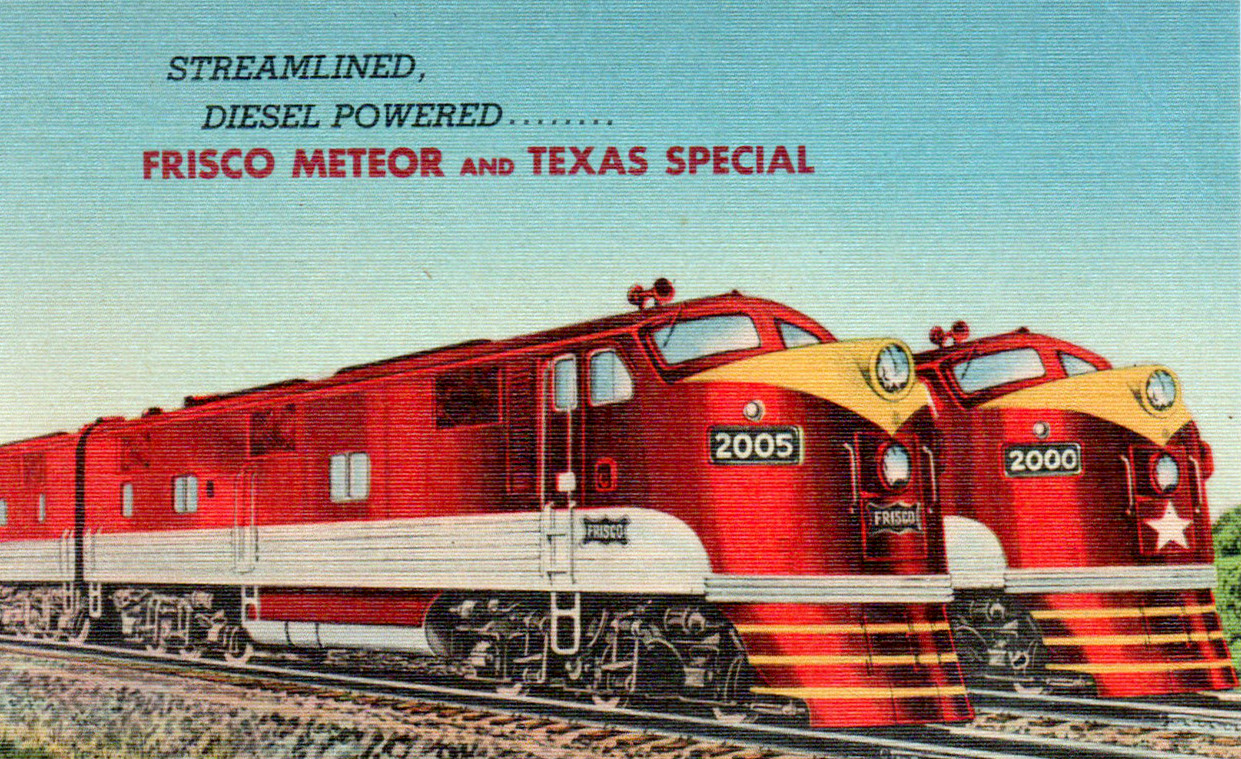
The Texas Special at right, with the Meteor, both with the same paint schemes and diesel locomotives.

In 1947 the Texas Special was upgraded to a diesel powered streamliner. Katy and Frisco outfitted two complete 14 car trains with EMD E7 locomotives and Pullman rolling stock. Each train had seven sleepers, three coaches, a coach-buffet-lounge car, a diner, a combination RPO-baggage car, and an observation car (sleeper-lounge-observation car or buffet-lounge-observation car). In the early years of the streamlined Texas Special all these cars were bright red with shining corrugated aluminum side panels. The locomotives were painted to match.

With two sets of equipment, the train could run daily from both St. Louis and San Antonio, departing one city in the afternoon and arriving in the other the following afternoon. Katy took the diesels off the train route in Waco for servicing and again used a Pacific class 4-6-2 steam locomotive, usually their Pacific 383, to take the train into San Antonio.

The Texas Special proved to be so popular that the two railroads soon had to purchase additional equipment. Two Alco PA-1 diesels were purchased by MKT in 1949. In some cases, older rail cars were repainted to match the distinctive Texas Special look. Soon it was not unusual for the Texas Special to run with 20 cars instead of the original 14. According to a historical pamphlet published by the MKT railroad in 1970, by 1950 the Texas Special was regarded as one of the most profitable streamliners in America. At the height of its popularity the Texas Special also offered through passenger service to New York City with through 14-4 sleeping cars, via the Pennsylvania Railroad.

In the mid-1950s the Katy was taken over by a conglomerate whose focus was freight train profits; they showed little interest in properly maintaining the track and equipment to operate a comfortable passenger streamliner. Trains would run late and passengers soon were finding alternative transportation. By 1959 conditions had deteriorated so much on the Katy lines that Frisco pulled out of the venture, with the Frisco portion of the Texas Special making its last trip on January 4, 1959. As a result of this change, Katy moved the northern terminus of the Texas Special from St. Louis to Kansas City, Missouri. In 1964 Texas Special service was discontinued south of Dallas, Texas. The last Texas Special ran on July 1, 1965.

Frisco purchased the E7 locomotives and Pullman cars for the Texas Special at the same time as they purchased ones for the Meteor, so the two trains shared the distinctive red and silver look. Frisco bought sets of named cars for each train.

== Named cars ==
Named trains frequently had named Texas Special cars after famous individuals or cities. Not all cars were named, but the ones that were bore their names prominently on their side panels. Here is a list of the named cars of the Texas Special.

Car Name	No.	Railroad	Type	Made	Notes
Rock Hill	250	SLSF	Baggage, 30’ Mail	1947	
Alexander Doniphan	650	SLSF	36-seat Diner	1947	
Anson B. Jones	1000	MKT	Baggage, 30’ Mail	1947	
Sam Houston	1100	MKT	36-seat Diner	1947	
Edward Burleson	1200	MKT	56-seat divided Coach	1947	
David G. Burnet	1201	MKT	56-seat divided Coach	1947	
J. Pinckney Henderson	1202	MKT	56-seat divided Coach	1947	*1
J. Pinckney Henderson	1202R	MKT	72-seat Coach Pullman Stainless Steel Demonstrator	1954	*1
Garland	1203	MKT	64-seat Divided Coach	1955	
Pryor	1204	MKT	64-seat Divided Coach	1955	
New Braunfels	1205	MKT	64-seat Divided Coach	1955	
McAlester	1206	MKT	64-seat Divided Coach	1955	
Denton	1207	MKT	64-seat Divided Coach	1955	
Olivette	1250	SLSF	56-seat divided Coach	1947	
Pasadena Hills	1251	SLSF	56-seat divided Coach	1947	
Baden	1252	SLSF	56-seat divided Coach	1947	
Picardy Lane	1259	SLSF	64-seat Divided Coach	1955	
Mirabeau B. Lamar	1300	MKT	26-seat Coach, Buffet, 25-seat Lounge	1947	
Temple	1301	MKT	32-seat Coach, Buffet, 27-seat Lounge	1955	
Joseph Pulitzer	1350	SLSF	2 Bedroom, 1 Drawing Room, Buffet, 23-seat Lounge, RE Observation	1947	
Stephen F. Austin	1400	MKT	2 Bedroom, 1 Drawing Room, Buffet, 23-seat Lounge, RE Observation	1947	
Pierre Laclede	1450	SLSF	14 Roomette, 4 Bedroom Sleeper	1947	
Thomas Hart Benton (politician)	1451	SLSF	14 Roomette, 4 Bedroom Sleeper	1947	
Henry Shaw	1452	SLSF	14 Roomette, 4 Bedroom Sleeper	1947	
Francis P. Blair	1453	SLSF	14 Roomette, 4 Bedroom Sleeper	1947	
Auguste Choteau	1454	SLSF	14 Roomette, 4 Bedroom Sleeper	1947	*2
George G. Vest	1455	SLSF	14 Roomette, 4 Bedroom Sleeper	1947	
Eugene Field	1456	SLSF	14 Roomette, 4 Bedroom Sleeper	1947	
James W. Fannin	1500	MKT	14 Roomette, 4 Bedroom Sleeper	1947	
Benjamin R. Milam	1501	MKT	14 Roomette, 4 Bedroom Sleeper	1947	
William B. Travis	1502	MKT	14 Roomette, 4 Bedroom Sleeper	1947	
David Crockett	1503	MKT	14 Roomette, 4 Bedroom Sleeper	1947	
James Bowie	1504	MKT	14 Roomette, 4 Bedroom Sleeper	1947	
James B. Bonham	1505	MKT	14 Roomette, 4 Bedroom Sleeper	1947	
Amon B. King	1506	MKT	14 Roomette, 4 Bedroom Sleeper	1947	
Sterling Price	1650	SLSF	26-seat Coach, Buffet, 25-seat Lounge	1947	
*1	1202R replaced 1202, which had been wrecked in an accident in 1953.				
*2	"Choteau" is a common misspelling of Chouteau. The name appears on the car manifest as "Auguste Choteau" for Rene Aguste Choteau. It is unknown at the time of this writing if the typo was on manifest or misspelled on the side of the car itself.				
Note:	Some model train manufacturers have put the names "Lonestar" and "Cheri Neil" on the side panels of Texas Special cars. At the time of this writing no references to the existence of actual Texas Special cars with these names have been found.				

The tail sign or drumhead which adorned the end of Texas Special observation cars

Note: Williams Electric Trains put the name Lonestar on many of its Texas Special passenger cars.

Note: The late Pat Neil, owner of Collectible Trains & Toys, a train store formerly located in Dallas, Texas, commissioned a Texas Special train in three-rail 0-Gauge with the firm K-Line. Although the prototype Texas Special did not have a vista-dome car, he felt that any respectable model of the Texas Special would include a dome car. So, the K-line model train included such a car, named after his wife, Cheri S.Neil.

== Preservation ==
- Although many of the cars from the Texas Special were scrapped, there still are surviving examples. These include -
  - J. Pinckney Henderson is owned by a private owner and is an Amtrak certified private car
  - Eugene Field is currently in the collection of the Arizona Railway Museum in Chandler, Arizona
  - New Braunfels is owned by the National Railway Historical Society and is located in Houston, Texas
  - Joseph Pulitzer resides near San Luis Obispo, California
  - McAlester, 1206, owned by the PBS TV show, Great Scenic Railway Journeys. Currently in North Carolina.
  - Tempe, 1301, owned by the PBS TV show, Great Scenic Railway Journeys. Currently in North Carolina.

== In popular culture ==
- The Texas Special is a popular prototype in Model Railroading. Texas Special trains have been produced by:
  - Lionel
  - MTH
  - Williams
  - Kusan
  - Con-Cor
  - American Models produced a trainset in S-gauge (1/64) using prototypical car names and E-8 locomotives.
- Hallmark Models, Inc., a model train manufacturer has produced E7 diesels in red and silver without lettering, so that modelers can customize them for either a Texas Special or Meteor train.
- Hallmark produced a Texas Special train in the Keepsake Ornaments range.
- Overland Models an importer of brass trains, also produced the E7 diesels and train cars.
