= KDKD-FM =

- Clinton, Missouri; United States
- Frequency: 95.3 MHz
- Branding: 95.3 KDKD

Programming
- Format: Country music
- Affiliations: [[Fox News Radio] [Brownfield Ag News Network]]

Ownership
- Owner: Clayton and Brittany Radford; (Radford Media Group, LLC)
- Sister stations: KXEA

History
- First air date: 1975

Technical information
- Licensing authority: FCC
- Facility ID: 12056
- Class: C3
- ERP: 14,500 watts
- HAAT: 132 meters (433 ft)
- Transmitter coordinates: 38°22′18″N 93°55′6″W

Links
- Public license information: Public file; LMS
- Webcast: Listen live
- Website: www.mykdkd.com

KDKD-FM (95.3 FM) is a commercial country music radio station licensed to Clinton, Missouri, and serving the West-Central Missouri region. Branded as “Today’s Country 95.3 KDKD,” the station features a contemporary country music format along with local news, weather, agriculture programming, and community information.

KDKD is owned and operated by Radford Media Group, LLC, a locally based media company focused on community-driven broadcasting and digital media services. The station provides coverage of regional high school athletics, local government meetings, community events, and severe weather updates. KDKD is also known for its partnerships with local organizations, businesses, and events across Henry County and surrounding areas.

In addition to its on-air programming, KDKD offers live streaming through its website and mobile applications, expanding its reach beyond traditional broadcast coverage. The station markets itself as “The Farm Voice of the Golden Valley,” reflecting its strong focus on agricultural news and rural audiences throughout West-Central Missouri.

KDKD operates alongside sister station KXEA (104.9 FM, “The Bizz”), providing a mix of music, sports, and local programming designed to serve the diverse interests of the regional audience.
