= List of Missouri railroads =

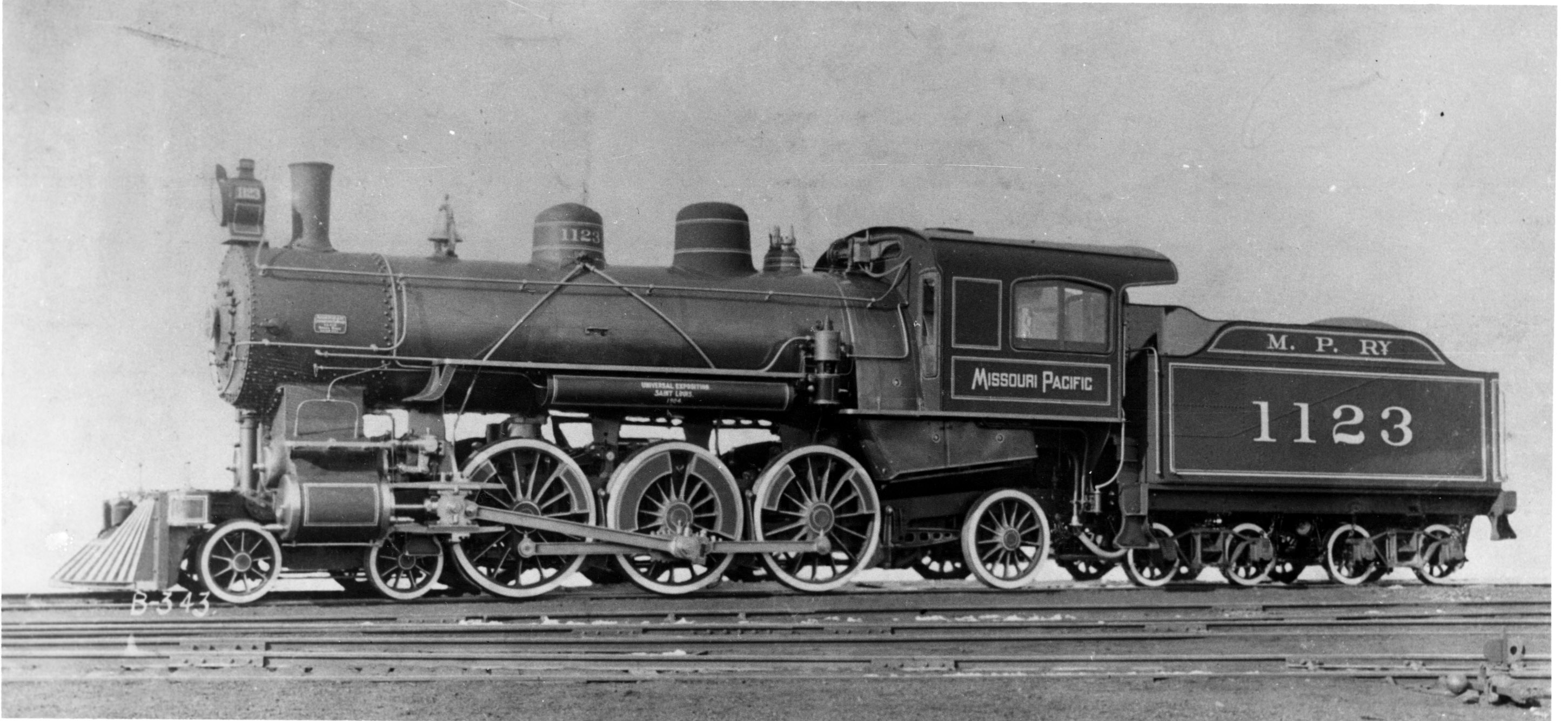
Missouri Pacific Locomotive number 1123, n.d.

The following railroads operate in the U.S. state of Missouri.

== Common freight carriers ==
- Arkansas and Missouri Railroad (AM)
- Affton Terminal Services Railroad (AT)
- Belton, Grandview and Kansas City Railroad (BGKX)
- BNSF Railway (BNSF)
- Burlington Junction Railway (BJRY)
- Canadian Pacific Kansas City (CPKC) through subsidiary Dakota, Minnesota and Eastern Railroad (DME)
- Central Midland Railway (CMR) operates Missouri Central Railroad (MOC)
- Columbia Terminal Railroad (CT)
- FTRL Railway (FTRL)
- Kansas City Terminal Railway (KCT)
- Kaw River Railroad (KAW)
- Missouri North Central Railroad (MNC)
- Missouri and Northern Arkansas Railroad (MNA)
- Norfolk Southern Railway (NS)
- Ozark Valley Railroad (OVRR)
- Pemiscot County Port Railroad (PCPA)
- SEMO Port Railroad (SE)
- South Kansas and Oklahoma Railroad (SKOL)
- Terminal Railroad Association of St. Louis (TRRA)
- Union Pacific Railroad (UP) including subsidiary Southern Illinois and Missouri Bridge Company
- West Belt Railroad (WBRW)

== Private freight carriers ==
- TransitAmerica Services

== Passenger carriers ==
- Amtrak (AMTK)
- Belton, Grandview and Kansas City Railroad
- Branson Scenic Railway
- St. Louis, Iron Mountain and Southern Railway

== Defunct railroads ==
Name	Mark	System (Note: This is one or more of the Class I railroads that the railroad became part of, if any.)	From	To	Successor	Notes
Adair County Railroad		CB&Q	1904	1911	Chicago, Burlington and Quincy Railroad	
Alexandria and Bloomfield Railroad		CB&Q	1857	1866	Alexandria and Nebraska City Railroad	
Alexandria, Canton, La Grange and West Quincy Railroad		CB&Q	1865	1870	Mississippi and Missouri River Air Line Railroad	
Alexandria and Nebraska City Railroad		CB&Q	1866	1870	Missouri, Iowa and Nebraska Railway	
Alton Railroad	A	GM&O	1931	1947	Gulf, Mobile and Ohio Railroad	
Arkansas Railroad		SLSF	1901	1901	Southern Missouri and Arkansas Railroad	
Arkansas and Ozarks Railway			1950	1961	N/A	
Atchison Branch of the Chicago and South Western Railway		RI	1870	1871	Chicago and South Western Railway	
Atchison and Eastern Bridge Company			1898			
Atchison and Nebraska Railroad		CB&Q	1871	1908	Chicago, Burlington and Quincy Railroad	
Atchison and St. Joseph Railroad		CB&Q	1855	1867	Missouri Valley Railroad	
Atchison, Topeka and Santa Fe Railroad		ATSF	1875	1895	Atchison, Topeka and Santa Fe Railway	
Atchison, Topeka and Santa Fe Railway	ATSF	ATSF	1895	1996	BNSF Railway	
Atlantic and Pacific Railroad		SLSF	1866	1878	St. Louis and San Francisco Railway	
Baltimore and Ohio Railroad	B&O, BO	B&O	1900	1987	Chesapeake and Ohio Railway	
Baltimore and Ohio Southwestern Railroad		B&O	1899	1900	Baltimore and Ohio Railroad	
Baltimore and Ohio Southwestern Railway		B&O	1893	1899	Baltimore and Ohio Southwestern Railroad	
Bellevue Valley Railroad						
Bennett and Cook Southeastern Railroad						
Bevier and Southern Railroad	BV&S, BVS		1914		N/A	
Blytheville, Leachville and Arkansas Southern Railroad		SSW	1908	1929	St. Louis Southwestern Railway	
Boone County and Boonville Railway		WAB	1873	1902	Columbia and St. Louis Railroad	
Boone County and Jefferson City Railroad		WAB	1857	1873	Boone County and Boonville Railway	
Boonville Railroad Bridge Company		MKT	1870	1925	Missouri–Kansas–Texas Railroad	
Boonville, St. Louis and Southern Railway		MP	1878	1956	Missouri Pacific Railroad	
Brownville and Nodaway Valley Railway		CB&Q	1872	1901	Chicago, Burlington and Quincy Railroad	
Brownwood and Northwestern Railway		SLSF	1886	1898	Cape Girardeau, Bloomfield and Southern Railway	
Brunswick and Chillicothe Railroad		WAB	1873	1924	Wabash Railway	
Burlington Northern Inc.	BN		1970	1981	Burlington Northern Railroad	
Burlington Northern Railroad	BN		1981	1996	Burlington Northern and Santa Fe Railway	
Burlington and Southwestern Railway		CB&Q	1871	1880	Chicago, Burlington and Kansas City Railway	
Butler County Railroad	BLC	SLSF	1905	1950	St. Louis – San Francisco Railway	
Cairo, Arkansas and Texas Railroad		MP	1872	1874	St. Louis, Iron Mountain and Southern Railway	
Cairo and Fulton Railroad		MP	1854	1866	Cairo, Arkansas and Texas Railroad	
Campbell and St. Francis Valley Railway						
Canton and Bloomfield Railroad		CB&Q	1851	1860	Mississippi and Missouri River Air Line Railroad	
Cape Girardeau Railway		SLSF	1880	1881	Cape Girardeau Southwestern Railway	
Cape Girardeau, Bloomfield and Southern Railway		SLSF	1887	1902	St. Louis and Gulf Railway	
Cape Girardeau and Chester Railroad			1902	1913	Cape Girardeau Northern Railway	
Cape Girardeau and Northern Railroad		SLSF	1901	1902	St. Louis, Memphis and Southeastern Railroad	
Cape Girardeau Northern Railway			1913	1937	N/A	
Cape Girardeau Southwestern Railway		SLSF	1881	1891	St. Louis, Cape Girardeau and Fort Smith Railway	
Cape Girardeau and State Line Railway		SLSF	1869	1880	Cape Girardeau Railway	
Cape Girardeau and Thebes Bridge Terminal Railroad			1902	1913	Cape Girardeau Northern Railway	
Carthage, Joplin and Short Creek Railway		MP	1881	1883	Missouri Pacific Railway	
Carthage and Western Railway		MP	1902	1910	Missouri Pacific Railway	
Cassville and Exeter Railway			1919	1956	N/A	
Cassville and Western Railroad			1913	1919	Cassville and Exeter Railway	
Cassville and Western Railway			1896	1913	Cassville and Western Railroad	
Central Railway of Missouri		RI	1881	1883	St. Louis and Central Missouri Railway	
Central Missouri Railway		MKT	1885	1888	Cleveland, St. Louis and Kansas City Railway	
Central North Missouri Branch of the St. Joseph and Iowa Railroad		CB&Q	1871	1871	Linneus Branch of the Burlington and Southwestern Railway	
Chariton and Randolph Railroad		WAB	1858	1864	North Missouri Railroad	
Chesapeake and Ohio Railway	CO		1987	1987	CSX Transportation	
Chester, Perryville and Ste. Genevieve Railway			1899	1913	Cape Girardeau Northern Railway	
Chester, Perryville, Ste. Genevieve and Farmington Railroad			1894	1899	Chester, Perryville and Ste. Genevieve Railway	
Chicago and Alton Railroad	C&A	GM&O	1870	1931	Alton Railroad	
Chicago and Atchison Bridge Company				1898	Atchison and Eastern Bridge Company	
Chicago, Burlington and Kansas City Railway		CB&Q	1881	1901	Chicago, Burlington and Quincy Railroad	
Chicago, Burlington and Quincy Railroad	CB&Q, CBQ	CB&Q	1869	1970	Burlington Northern Inc.	
Chicago, Burlington and Quincy Railway		CB&Q	1901	1907	N/A	Operated the Chicago, Burlington and Quincy Railroad under lease, but did not own any railroad
Chicago and Eastern Illinois Railroad	C&EI, CEI	C&EI	1940	1976	Missouri Pacific Railroad	
Chicago and Eastern Illinois Railroad		C&EI	1904	1922	Chicago and Eastern Illinois Railway	
Chicago and Eastern Illinois Railway	C&EI	C&EI	1922	1940	Chicago and Eastern Illinois Railroad	
Chicago Great Western Railroad	CGW	CGW	1909	1941	Chicago Great Western Railway	
Chicago Great Western Railway	CGW	CGW	1941	1968	Chicago and North Western Railway	
Chicago Great Western Railway		CGW	1892	1909	Chicago Great Western Railroad	
Chicago, Kansas and Nebraska Railway		RI	1886	1891	Chicago, Rock Island and Pacific Railway	
Chicago, Kansas City and Texas Railway		CB&Q	1887	1893	Kansas City and Atlantic Railroad	
Chicago, Milwaukee and St. Paul Railway		MILW	1874	1928	Chicago, Milwaukee, St. Paul and Pacific Railroad	
Chicago, Milwaukee, St. Paul and Pacific Railroad	MILW	MILW	1928	1985	The Milwaukee Road, Inc.	
Chicago, Missouri and Western Railway	CMNW		1987	1990	Gateway Western Railway	
Chicago and North Western Railway	CNW	CNW	1968	1972	Chicago and North Western Transportation Company	
Chicago and North Western Transportation Company	CNW	CNW	1972	1995	Union Pacific Railroad	
Chicago, Rock Island and Pacific Railroad	RI, ROCK	RI	1948	1980	Atchison, Topeka and Santa Fe Railway, Chicago and North Western Transportation Company, St. Louis Southwestern Railway	
Chicago, Rock Island and Pacific Railway	RI	RI	1880	1948	Chicago, Rock Island and Pacific Railroad	
Chicago, St. Paul and Kansas City Railway		CGW	1886	1893	Chicago Great Western Railway	
Chicago, Santa Fe and California Railway		ATSF	1887	1900	Atchison, Topeka and Santa Fe Railway	
Chicago, Santa Fe and California Railway of Iowa		ATSF	1886	1887	Chicago, Santa Fe and California Railway	
Chicago and South Western Railway		RI	1869	1878	Iowa Southern and Missouri Northern Railroad	
Chillicothe and Brunswick Railroad		WAB	1864	1873	Brunswick and Chillicothe Railroad	
Chillicothe–Brunswick Rail Maintenance Authority	CBRM		1986	2007	Missouri North Central Railroad	
Chillicothe and Des Moines City Railroad						
Chillicothe and Omaha Railroad		WAB	1869	1870	St. Louis, Council Bluffs and Omaha Railroad	
Chillicothe Southern Railroad	CHSR		1986	1986	Chillicothe–Brunswick Rail Maintenance Authority	
City Terminal Railway		CGW	1899	1905	Chicago Great Western Railway	
Clarinda and St. Louis Railroad		WAB	1879	1879	St. Louis, Kansas City and Northern Railway	
Clarksville and Western Railroad		CB&Q	1870	1873	Mississippi Valley and Western Railway	
Cleveland, Cincinnati, Chicago and St. Louis Railway		NYC	1889	1930	New York Central Railroad	
Cleveland, St. Louis and Kansas City Railway		MKT	1888	1890	Missouri, Kansas and Eastern Railway	
Columbia and St. Louis Railroad		WAB	1902	1902	Wabash Railroad	
Consolidated Rail Corporation	CR		1976	1999	CSX Transportation	
Consolidated Terminal Railway of Kansas City		KCS	1891	1892	Kansas City Suburban Belt Railroad	
Council Bluffs and St. Louis Railroad		WAB	1878	1879	St. Louis, Kansas City and Northern Railway	
Crawford County Midland Railroad		SLSF	1904	1905	St. Louis and San Francisco Railroad	
Crystal Railway		SLSF	1880	1902	St. Louis, Memphis and Southeastern Railroad	
Crystal City Railway		SLSF	1878	1881	Crystal Railway	
Current River Railroad		SLSF	1887	1901	Kansas City, Fort Scott and Memphis Railway	
Deering Southwestern Railway	DSW	SSW	1903	1929	St. Louis Southwestern Railway	
Dent and Phelps Railroad		SLSF	1877	1881	St. Louis, Salem and Little Rock Railroad	
Des Moines and Kansas City Railway		CB&Q	1888	1898	Missouri, Iowa and Nebraska Railway	
Des Moines, Osceola and Southern Railroad		CB&Q	1879	1887	Des Moines and Kansas City Railway	
Des Peres Valley Railway						
Doniphan Branch Railway		MP	1882	1884	St. Louis, Iron Mountain and Southern Railway	
Edgewater Terminal Railroad		MP	1900			
Eureka Springs Railway			1882	1899	St. Louis and North Arkansas Railway	
Excelsior Springs Railroad		WAB	1893	1897	Kansas City, Excelsior Springs and Northern Railway	
Forest Park and Central Railroad		RI	1877	1884	St. Louis, Kansas City and Colorado Railroad	
Fort Scott and Carthage Railroad		SLSF	1881	1882	Kansas and Missouri Railroad	
Fort Scott, South Eastern and Memphis Railroad		SLSF	1880	1888	Kansas City, Fort Scott and Springfield Railroad	
Gateway Western Railway	GWWR		1990	2001	Kansas City Southern Railway	
Gideon and North Island Railroad		SSW	1908	1930	St. Louis Southwestern Railway	
Grant City and Southern Railroad		CB&Q	1898	1901	Chicago, Burlington and Quincy Railroad	
Gray's Point Terminal Railway		SSW	1896	1958	St. Louis Southwestern Railway	
Greenfield Railroad		SLSF	1884	1886	Greenfield and Northern Railroad	
Greenfield and Northern Railroad		SLSF	1886	1895	Kansas City, Fort Scott and Memphis Railroad	
Gulf, Mobile and Ohio Railroad	GM&O		1940	1972	Illinois Central Gulf Railroad	
Hamilton and Kingston Railroad						
Hannibal Bridge Company		WAB	1869	1937	Wabash – Hannibal Bridge Company	
Hannibal Connecting Railroad	HC		1902	1965	N/A	
Hannibal and Central Missouri Railroad		MKT	1867	1873	Missouri, Kansas and Texas Railway	
Hannibal and St. Joseph Railroad		CB&Q	1847	1901	Chicago, Burlington and Quincy Railroad	
Hannibal Union Depot Company		CB&Q	1881	1953	Chicago, Burlington and Quincy Railroad	
Higginsville Switch Company						
Houck's Missouri and Arkansas Railroad		SLSF	1893	1902	St. Louis and Gulf Railway	
Illinois Central Railroad	IC	IC	1902	1972	Illinois Central Gulf Railroad	
Illinois Central Gulf Railroad	ICG		1972			
Illinois and St. Louis Bridge Company			1868	1878	St. Louis Bridge Company	
Illinois Southern Railway		MP	1903	1920	Missouri–Illinois Railroad	
I&M Rail Link	IMRL		1997	2002	Iowa, Chicago and Eastern Railroad	
Iron County Central Railroad			1912			
Iowa, Chicago and Eastern Railroad	ICE		2002	2008	Dakota, Minnesota and Eastern Railroad	
Iowa and St. Louis Railway		CB&Q	1901	1903	Chicago, Burlington and Quincy Railroad	
Iowa Southern and Missouri Northern Railroad		RI	1876	1880	Chicago, Rock Island and Pacific Railway	
Jackson Branch Railroad		MP	1883	1885	St. Louis, Iron Mountain and Southern Railway	
Jefferson City, Lebanon and Southwestern Railway		MP	1871	1883	Missouri Pacific Railway	
Joplin Railroad		SLSF	1874	1882	Joplin Railway	
Joplin Railway		SLSF	1882	1882	St. Louis and San Francisco Railway	
Joplin and Galena Railway		SLSF	1880	1882	Joplin Railway	
Joplin Union Depot Company		ATSF/ KCS/ MKT	1908			Still exists as a joint subsidiary of the BNSF Railway, Kansas City Southern Railway, and Union Pacific Railroad
Joplin and Western Railway		MP	1890	1910	Missouri Pacific Railway	
Kansas City and Atlantic Railroad		CB&Q	1893	1897	Kansas City and Northern Connecting Railroad	
Kansas City Belt Railway			1882	1910	Kansas City Terminal Railway	
Kansas City Bridge and Terminal Railway		CB&Q	1889	1893	Kansas City and Atlantic Railroad	
Kansas City and Cameron Railroad		CB&Q	1866	1870	Hannibal and St. Joseph Railroad	
Kansas City, Clinton and Springfield Railroad		SLSF	1884	1885	Kansas City, Clinton and Springfield Railway	
Kansas City, Clinton and Springfield Railway		SLSF	1885	1928	St. Louis – San Francisco Railway	
Kansas City Connecting Railroad	KCC		1914	1983	N/A	
Kansas City and Eastern Railway		MP	1878	1880	Missouri Pacific Railway	
Kansas City, Eldorado and Southern Railway		MKT	1892	1899	Missouri, Kansas and Texas Railway	
Kansas City, Excelsior Springs and Northern Railway		WAB	1897	1933	N/A	
Kansas City, Fort Scott, and Gulf Railroad		SLSF	1879	1888	Kansas City, Fort Scott and Memphis Railroad	
Kansas City, Fort Scott and Memphis Railroad		SLSF	1888	1901	Kansas City, Fort Scott and Memphis Railway	
Kansas City, Fort Scott and Memphis Railway		SLSF	1901	1928	St. Louis – San Francisco Railway	
Kansas City, Fort Scott and Springfield Railroad		SLSF	1888	1888	Kansas City, Fort Scott and Memphis Railway	
Kansas City, Fort Smith and Southern Railroad		KCS	1887	1897	Kansas City, Pittsburg and Gulf Railroad	
Kansas City, Galveston, and Lake Superior Railroad		CB&Q	1857	1866	Kansas City and Cameron Railroad	
Kansas City and Grandview Railway		KCS	1926	1943	Kansas City Southern Railway	
Kansas City and Independence Air Line		KCS	1891	1902	Kansas City Southern Railway	
Kansas City, Leavenworth and Atchison Railway		MP	1880	1880	Missouri Pacific Railway	
Kansas City and Memphis Railroad		SLSF	1872	1879	Springfield and Western Missouri Railroad	
Kansas City, Memphis and Mobile Railroad		SLSF	1871	1880	Kansas City and Southern Railway	
Kansas City, Nevada and Fort Smith Railroad		KCS	1889	1893	Kansas City, Pittsburg and Gulf Railroad	
Kansas City and Northern Connecting Railroad		CB&Q	1895	1901	Kansas City, Peoria and Chicago Railway	
Kansas City, Osceola and Southern Railway		SLSF	1891	1900	St. Louis and San Francisco Railroad	
Kansas City, Ozark and Southern Railway			1908	1935	N/A	
Kansas City, Peoria and Chicago Railway		CB&Q	1901	1902	Quincy, Omaha and Kansas City Railroad	
Kansas City, Pittsburg and Gulf Railroad		KCS	1893	1900	Kansas City Southern Railway	
Kansas City, Rich Hill and Southern Railroad		KCS	1887	1890	Kansas City, Nevada and Fort Smith Railroad	
Kansas City Rock Island Railway		RI	1902	1905	Chicago, Rock Island and Pacific Railway	
Kansas City, St. Joseph and Burlington Railway		CB&Q	1881	1881	Chicago, Burlington and Kansas City Railway	
Kansas City, St. Joseph and Council Bluffs Railroad		CB&Q	1870	1901	Chicago, Burlington and Quincy Railroad	
Kansas City, St. Louis and Chicago Railroad		GM&O	1877	1949	Gulf, Mobile and Ohio Railroad	
Kansas City and Southern Railway		SLSF	1880	1891	Kansas City, Osceola and Southern Railway	
Kansas City and Southwestern Railway of Missouri		MP	1886	1909	Missouri Pacific Railway	
Kansas City, Springfield and Memphis Railroad		SLSF	1881	1888	Kansas City, Fort Scott and Memphis Railroad	
Kansas City Suburban Belt Railroad		KCS	1887	1902	Kansas City Southern Railway	
Kansas City and Topeka Railway		RI	1887	1889	Chicago, Rock Island and Pacific Railway	
Kansas City, Topeka and Western Railroad		ATSF	1875	1899	Atchison, Topeka and Santa Fe Railway	
Kansas and Missouri Railroad		SLSF	1882	1888	Kansas City, Fort Scott and Springfield Railroad	
Kansas and Neosho Valley Railroad		SLSF	1865	1868	Missouri River, Fort Scott & Gulf Railroad	
Kansas Pacific Railway		UP	1869	1880	Union Pacific Railway	
Kansas and Texas Coal Company			1898	1902	Missouri and Louisiana Railroad	
Kennett and Osceola Railroad		SLSF	1896	1902	St. Louis and Gulf Railway	
Keokuk and Kansas City Railway		WAB	1873	1875	Salisbury and Glasgow Railroad	
Keokuk and Western Railroad		CB&Q	1886	1901	Chicago, Burlington and Quincy Railroad	
Laclede and Creve Coeur Lake Railroad		MP	1880	1883	Missouri Pacific Railway	
Lawrence and Pleasant Hill Railway		SLSF	1869	1870	St. Louis, Lawrence and Denver Railroad	
Lead Belt Railway			1898			
Leavenworth and Des Moines Railway		RI	1867	1869	Chicago and South Western Railway	
Leavenworth, Kansas and Western Railway		UP	1897	1908	Union Pacific Railroad	
Leavenworth, Pawnee and Western Railroad		UP	1855	1863	Union Pacific Railway, Eastern Division	
Leavenworth and Platte County Bridge Company		CGW	1888	1892	Leavenworth Terminal Railway and Bridge Company	
Leavenworth and St. Joseph Railway		CGW	1890	1892	Chicago Great Western Railway	
Leavenworth Terminal Railway and Bridge Company		CGW	1892	1940	Chicago Great Western Railroad	
Leon, Mount Ayr and Southwestern Railroad		CB&Q	1878	1901	Chicago, Burlington and Quincy Railroad	
Lexington, Chillicothe and Gulf Railroad		MP	1869	1870	Lexington, Lake and Gulf Railroad	
Lexington, Lake and Gulf Railroad		MP	1870	1879	Lexington and Southern Railway	
Lexington and St. Louis Railroad		MP	1859	1877	St. Louis and Lexington Railroad	
Lexington and Southern Railway		MP	1879	1880	Missouri Pacific Railway	
Linneus Branch of the Burlington and Southwestern Railway		CB&Q	1871	1880	Chicago, Burlington and Kansas City Railway	
Little River Valley and Arkansas Railroad		SSW	1876	1881	Texas and St. Louis Railway	
Louisiana Bridge Company		GM&O	1873	1873	Mississippi River Bridge Company	
Louisiana and Missouri River Railroad		GM&O	1859	1949	Gulf, Mobile and Ohio Railroad	
Louisville and Nashville Railroad	L&N, LN	L&N	1889	1983	Seaboard System Railroad	
Memphis, Carthage and Northwestern Railroad		SLSF	1871	1875	Missouri and Western Railway	
Memphis and St. Louis Railroad		SLSF	1899	1901	St. Louis and Memphis Railway	
Middlebrook, Graniteville and Belleview Railroad			1903			
Mill Springs, Current River and Barnesville Railroad			1884	1886	Missouri Southern Railroad	
The Milwaukee Road, Inc.	MILW	MILW	1985	1986	Soo Line Railroad	
Mineral Belt Railroad		SLSF	1886	1901	Kansas City, Fort Scott and Memphis Railway	
Mississippi and Missouri River Air Line Railroad		CB&Q	1857	1871	Mississippi Valley and Western Railway	
Mississippi River and Bonne Terre Railway		MP	1888	1945	Missouri–Illinois Railroad	
Mississippi River Bridge Company		GM&O	1873	1895	Louisiana and Missouri River Railroad	
Mississippi Valley Railroad		CB&Q	1871	1873	Mississippi Valley and Western Railway	
Mississippi Valley Railway			1904			
Mississippi Valley and Western Railway		CB&Q	1871	1875	St. Louis, Keokuk and North Western Railway	
Missouri and Arkansas Railroad of Missouri			1880	1882	Eureka Springs Railway	
Missouri and Arkansas Railway	MAR, MA		1935	1950	Arkansas and Ozarks Railway	
Missouri Central Railroad						
Missouri Central Railway		RI	1871	1881	Central Railway of Missouri	
Missouri–Illinois Railroad	MI	MP	1921	1978	Missouri Pacific Railroad	
Missouri and Illinois Bridge and Belt Railroad		CB&Q	1904	1966	Chicago, Burlington and Quincy Railroad	
Missouri, Iowa and Nebraska Railway		CB&Q	1870	1886	Keokuk and Western Railroad	
Missouri, Kansas and Eastern Railway		MKT	1892	1896	Missouri, Kansas and Texas Railway	
Missouri, Kansas and Northwestern Railroad		MKT	1900	1902	Missouri, Kansas and Texas Railway	
Missouri–Kansas–Texas Railroad	M-K-T, MKT	MKT	1923	1989	Missouri Pacific Railroad	
Missouri, Kansas and Texas Railway	MK&T	MKT	1872	1923	Missouri–Kansas–Texas Railroad	
Missouri, Kansas and Texas Terminal Company of Kansas City		MKT	1905	1906	Missouri, Kansas and Texas Railway	
Missouri, Kansas and Texas Terminal Company of St. Louis		MKT	1909	1925	Missouri–Kansas–Texas Railroad	
Missouri and Louisiana Railroad			1902	1914	Bevier and Southern Railroad	
Missouri Midland Railway		MKT	1898	1901	Missouri, Kansas and Texas Railway	
Missouri and Mississippi Railroad		WAB	1865	1873	Keokuk and Kansas City Railway	
Missouri and North Arkansas Railroad	M&NA		1906	1922	Missouri and North Arkansas Railway	
Missouri and North Arkansas Railway	M&NA		1922	1935	Missouri and Arkansas Railway	
Missouri, Oklahoma and Gulf Railway		MP	1913	1919	N/A	
Missouri Pacific Railroad	MP	MP	1917	1997	Union Pacific Railroad	
Missouri Pacific Railway		MP	1876	1917	Missouri Pacific Railroad	
Missouri River Railroad		MP	1865	1880	Kansas City, Leavenworth and Atchison Railway	
Missouri River, Fort Scott & Gulf Railroad		SLSF	1868	1879	Kansas City, Fort Scott, and Gulf Railroad	
Missouri River Valley Railroad		WAB	1859	1864	North Missouri Railroad	
Missouri Southeastern Railway		SLSF	1891	1898	Cape Girardeau, Bloomfield and Southern Railway	
Missouri Southern Railroad	MS		1886	1941	N/A	
Missouri Valley Railroad		CB&Q	1867	1870	Kansas City, St. Joseph and Council Bluffs Railroad	
Missouri Valley Park Railroad	MVP		2003	2010		
Missouri and Western Railway		SLSF	1875	1879	St. Louis and San Francisco Railway	
Mobile and Ohio Railroad		GM&O		1940	Gulf, Mobile and Ohio Railroad	
Morley and Morehouse Railroad		SLSF	1897	1902	St. Louis and Gulf Railway	
Nevada and Girard Railway		MP	1882	1885	Nevada and Minden Railway	
Nevada and Minden Railway		MP	1885	1909	Missouri Pacific Railway	
New York Central Railroad	NYC	NYC	1930	1968	Penn Central Transportation Company	
New York, Chicago and St. Louis Railroad	NKP	NKP	1923	1964	Norfolk and Western Railway	
Nodaway Valley Railroad		CB&Q	1879	1900	Kansas City, St. Joseph and Council Bluffs Railroad	
Norfolk and Western Railway	NW		1964	1998	Norfolk Southern Railway	
North Missouri Railroad		WAB	1851	1871	St. Louis, Kansas City and Northern Railway	
North Missouri Central Railroad						
Northern Railroad		CB&Q	1898	1898	Kansas City and Northern Connecting Railroad	
Ohio and Mississippi Railway		B&O	1889	1893	Baltimore and Ohio Southwestern Railway	
Omaha, Kansas City and Eastern Railroad		CB&Q	1896	1902	Quincy, Omaha and Kansas City Railroad	
Omaha and St. Louis Railroad		WAB	1896	1901	Wabash Railroad	
Omaha and St. Louis Railway		WAB	1887	1896	Omaha and St. Louis Railroad	
Oregon Interurban Railway			1907			
Osage Valley and Southern Kansas Railroad		MP	1857	1881	Boonville, St. Louis and Southern Railway	
Ozark Southern Railway						
Ozark Valley Railway						
Pacific Railroad		MP	1849	1876	Missouri Pacific Railway	
Paragould and Buffalo Island Railway		SSW	1887	1893	Paragould Southeastern Railway	
Paragould–Memphis Railroad						
Paragould and Memphis Railway						
Paragould Southeastern Railway		SSW	1893	1958	St. Louis Southwestern Railway	
Pemiscot Railroad		SLSF	1892	1895	St. Louis, Kennett and Southern Railroad	
Pemiscot Southern Railroad		SLSF	1900	1902	St. Louis and Gulf Railway	
Penn Central Transportation Company	PC		1968	1976	Consolidated Rail Corporation	
Pennsylvania Railroad	PRR	PRR	1921	1968	Penn Central Transportation Company	
Pierce City and Kansas Railroad		SLSF	1875	1875	Missouri and Western Railway	
Pike County Short Line Railroad			1871	1872	St. Louis and Keokuk Railroad	
Pilot Knob, Cape Girardeau and Belmont Railroad		SLSF	1859	1869	Cape Girardeau and State Line Railway	
Pittsburgh, Cincinnati, Chicago and St. Louis Railroad		PRR	1917	1921	Pennsylvania Railroad	
Platte City and Fort Des Moines Railroad		RI	1864	1867	Leavenworth and Des Moines Railway	
Platte Country Railroad		CB&Q	1863	1864	Atchison and St. Joseph Railroad, Weston and Atchison Railroad	
Platte County Railroad		CB&Q	1853	1863	Platte Country Railroad	
Platte County and Fort Des Moines Railroad		RI	1860	1864	Platte City and Fort Des Moines Railroad	
Pleasant Hill and De Soto Railroad		SLSF	1877	1885	Kansas City, Clinton and Springfield Railway	
Pleasant Hill Division of the Lexington, Chillicothe and Gulf Railroad		MP	1870	1870	Lexington, Lake and Gulf Railroad	
Pleasant Hill and Lawrence Branch of the Pacific Railroad		SLSF		1870	St. Louis, Lawrence and Denver Railroad	
Poplar Bluff and Dan River Railway			1906			
Quincy Bridge Company		CB&Q	1866	1866	Quincy Railroad Bridge Company	
Quincy, Missouri and Pacific Railroad		CB&Q	1869	1888	Quincy, Omaha and Kansas City Railroad	
Quincy, Omaha and Kansas City Railway		CB&Q	1887	1897	Quincy, Omaha and Kansas City Railroad	
Quincy, Omaha and Kansas City Railroad		CB&Q	1897	1939	Chicago, Burlington and Quincy Railroad	
Quincy and Palmyra Railroad		CB&Q	1856	1867	Hannibal and St. Joseph Railroad	
Quincy Railroad Bridge Company		CB&Q	1866	1903	Chicago, Burlington and Quincy Railroad	
Railroad Switching Service of Missouri	RSM		1989	2005	N/A	
Rich Hill Railroad		SLSF	1880	1888	Kansas City, Fort Scott and Springfield Railroad	
Rock Island – Frisco Terminal Railway		RI/ SLSF	1906	1957	Chicago, Rock Island and Pacific Railroad, St. Louis – San Francisco Railway	
Rock Port, Langdon and Northern Railway			1889	1945	N/A	
St. Charles Bridge Company		WAB	1868	1878	St. Louis, Kansas City and Northern Railway	
St. Clair, Madison and St. Louis Belt Railroad		CB&Q	1890	1904	Missouri and Illinois Bridge and Belt Railroad	
St. Francois Valley Railroad		SLSF	1898	1902	St. Louis and Gulf Railway	
St. Joseph Belt Railway	SJB		1908			
St. Joseph and Central Branch Railway		MP	1905			
St. Joseph and Council Bluffs Railroad		CB&Q	1867	1870	Kansas City, St. Joseph and Council Bluffs Railroad	
St. Joseph and Des Moines Railroad		CB&Q	1877	1901	Chicago, Burlington and Quincy Railroad	
St. Joseph and Grand Island Railway	SJGI	UP	1898	1936	Union Pacific Railroad	
St. Joseph and Iowa Railroad		RI	1857	1888	Chicago, Rock Island and Pacific Railway	
St. Joseph and Nebraska Railroad		CB&Q	1882	1901	Chicago, Burlington and Quincy Railroad	
St. Joseph and St. Louis Railroad		ATSF	1874	1888	St. Joseph, St. Louis and Santa Fe Railway	
St. Joseph, St. Louis and Santa Fe Railway		ATSF	1888	1900	Atchison, Topeka and Santa Fe Railway	
St. Joseph and Santa Fe Railroad		ATSF	1887	1888	St. Joseph, St. Louis and Santa Fe Railway	
St. Joseph Terminal Company		ATSF/ UP	1886	1887	St. Joseph Terminal Railroad	
St. Joseph Terminal Railroad	SJT	ATSF/ UP	1887			Still exists as a joint subsidiary of the BNSF Railway and Union Pacific Railroad
St. Joseph Union Depot Company		ATSF/ CB&Q/ CGW/ MP/ RI/ UP	1880	1962	N/A	
St. Louis, Arkansas and Texas Railway		SSW	1886	1891	St. Louis Southwestern Railway	
St. Louis, Arkansas and Texas Railway		SLSF	1880	1882	St. Louis and San Francisco Railway	
St. Louis, Arkansas and Texas Terminal Railway		SSW	1888	1888	St. Louis, Arkansas and Texas Railway	
St. Louis Belt and Terminal Railway			1902		Terminal Railroad Association of St. Louis	
St. Louis Bridge Company			1878		Terminal Railroad Association of St. Louis	
St. Louis, Cape Girardeau and Fort Smith Railway		SLSF	1891	1899	Southern Missouri and Arkansas Railroad	
St. Louis, Cape Girardeau and Southern Railroad			1900	1902	Cape Girardeau and Chester Railroad	
St. Louis, Caruthersville and Memphis Railroad		SLSF	1897	1901	St. Louis and Memphis Railway	
St. Louis and Central Missouri Railway		RI	1883	1886	St. Louis, Kansas City and Colorado Railroad	
St. Louis, Chillicothe and Omaha Railroad		WAB	1868	1869	Chillicothe and Omaha Railroad	
St. Louis, Council Bluffs and Omaha Railroad		WAB	1870	1924	Wabash Railway	
St. Louis and Fort Scott Railroad		RI	1870	1871	Missouri Central Railway	
St. Louis and Gulf Railway		SLSF	1902	1904	St. Louis, Memphis and Southeastern Railroad	
St. Louis and Hannibal Railroad	SL&H, SLH		1917	1944	N/A	
St. Louis and Hannibal Railway			1885	1917	St. Louis and Hannibal Railroad	
St. Louis, Hannibal and Kansas City Railway			1891	1893	St. Louis, Hannibal and Keokuk Railroad	
St. Louis, Hannibal and Keokuk Railroad			1872	1885	St. Louis and Hannibal Railway	
St. Louis and Illinois Bridge Company			1864	1868	Illinois and St. Louis Bridge Company	
St. Louis and Iron Mountain Railroad		MP	1851	1874	St. Louis, Iron Mountain and Southern Railway	
St. Louis, Iron Mountain and Southern Railway		MP	1874	1917	Missouri Pacific Railway	
St. Louis, Kansas and Arizona Railway		MP	1879	1880	Missouri Pacific Railway	
St. Louis and Kansas City Railway		MKT	1895	1897	Missouri, Kansas and Texas Railway	
St. Louis, Kansas City and Colorado Railroad		RI	1884	1905	Kansas City Rock Island Railway	
St. Louis, Kansas City and Northern Railway		WAB	1872	1879	Wabash, St. Louis and Pacific Railway	
St. Louis, Kennett and Southeastern Railroad		SLSF	1906	1950	St. Louis – San Francisco Railway	
St. Louis, Kennett and Southern Railroad		SLSF	1890	1902	St. Louis and Gulf Railway	
St. Louis and Keokuk Railroad			1857	1872	St. Louis, Hannibal and Keokuk Railroad	
St. Louis, Keokuk and Northwestern Railroad		CB&Q	1887	1901	Chicago, Burlington and Quincy Railroad	
St. Louis, Keokuk and North Western Railway		CB&Q	1875	1887	St. Louis, Keokuk and Northwestern Railroad	
St. Louis, Lawrence and Denver Railroad		SLSF	1870	1874	St. Louis, Lawrence and Western Railroad	
St. Louis, Lawrence and Western Railroad		SLSF	1874	1877	Pleasant Hill and De Soto Railroad	
St. Louis and Lexington Railroad		MP	1877	1880	Missouri Pacific Railway	
St. Louis and Memphis Railroad		SLSF	1898	1901	St. Louis and Memphis Railway	
St. Louis and Memphis Railway		SLSF	1901	1902	St. Louis, Memphis and Southeastern Railroad	
St. Louis, Memphis and Southeastern Railroad		SLSF	1902	1907	St. Louis and San Francisco Railroad	
St. Louis Merchants Bridge Company			1886	1920	St. Louis Merchants Bridge Terminal Railway	
St. Louis Merchants Bridge Terminal Railway	SLMB		1887		Terminal Railroad Association of St. Louis	
St. Louis and Missouri Southern Railway			1910			
St. Louis, Morehouse and Southern Railroad		SLSF	1899	1904	St. Louis and Gulf Railway	
St. Louis and North Arkansas Railway			1899	1906	Missouri and North Arkansas Railroad	
St. Louis, Oak Hill and Carondelet Railway		MP	1886	1910	Missouri Pacific Railway	
St. Louis Railway and Dock Company						
St. Louis and St. Joseph Railroad		ATSF	1868	1874	St. Joseph and St. Louis Railroad	
St. Louis, Salem and Arkansas Railway		SLSF	1887	1897	St. Louis and San Francisco Railroad	
St. Louis, Salem and Little Rock Railroad		SLSF	1871	1887	St. Louis, Salem and Arkansas Railway	
St. Louis and San Francisco Railroad		SLSF	1896	1916	St. Louis – San Francisco Railway	
St. Louis and San Francisco Railway		SLSF	1876	1896	St. Louis and San Francisco Railroad	
St. Louis – San Francisco Railway	SLSF	SLSF	1916	1980	Burlington Northern Inc.	
St. Louis and Santa Fe Railroad, Missouri Division		MKT	1869	1872	Missouri, Kansas and Texas Railway	
St. Louis Southwestern Railway	SSW	SSW	1891	1997	Union Pacific Railroad	
St. Louis Terminal Railway			1892		Terminal Railroad Association of St. Louis	
St. Louis Transfer Railway			1884		Terminal Railroad Association of St. Louis	
St. Louis Tunnel Railroad			1872	1878	Tunnel Railroad of St. Louis	
St. Paul and Kansas City Short Line Railroad		RI	1911	1948	Chicago, Rock Island and Pacific Railroad	
Salem, Winona and Southern Railroad			1908	1928	N/A	
Saline Valley Railroad			1904	1913	Cape Girardeau Northern Railway	
Salisbury and Glasgow Railroad		WAB	1877	1877	St. Louis, Kansas City and Northern Railway	
Seaboard System Railroad	SBD		1983	1986	CSX Transportation	
Sedalia, Warsaw and Southern Railway		MP	1879	1891	Sedalia, Warsaw and South Western Railway	
Sedalia, Warsaw and South Western Railway		MP	1891	1910	Missouri Pacific Railway	
Shelby County Railway			1906	1938	N/A	
Shelby Northwestern Railway			1911	1938	N/A	
Short Creek and Joplin Railroad		SLSF	1879	1888	Kansas City, Fort Scott and Springfield Railroad	
Sibley Bridge Company		ATSF	1887	1900	Atchison, Topeka and Santa Fe Railway	
Sligo and Eastern Railroad	SL&E		1902	1929	N/A	
Sligo Furnace Railroad		SLSF	1880	1881	St. Louis, Salem and Little Rock Railroad	
Soo Line Railroad	SOO		1986	1997	I&M Rail Link	
South Pacific Railroad		SLSF	1868	1870	Atlantic and Pacific Railroad	
Southeast Kansas Railroad	SEKR		1987	1999	South Kansas and Oklahoma Railroad	
Southern Railway	SOU	SOU	1902	1990	Norfolk Southern Railway	
Southern Missouri Railway		MP	1900	1903	Illinois Southern Railway	
Southern Missouri and Arkansas Railroad		SLSF	1899	1902	St. Louis, Memphis and Southeastern Railroad	
Southwest Pacific Railroad		SLSF	1866	1868	South Pacific Railroad	
Springfield Connecting Railway		SLSF	1886	1926	St. Louis – San Francisco Railway	
Springfield and Northern Railway		SLSF	1884	1885	St. Louis and San Francisco Railway	
Springfield and Southern Railway		SLSF	1882	1885	St. Louis and San Francisco Railway	
Springfield Southwestern Railway		MP	1903	1909	St. Louis, Iron Mountain and Southern Railway	
Springfield and Western Missouri Railroad		SLSF	1877	1888	Kansas City, Springfield and Memphis Railroad	
Springfield Western and Southern Railroad of Missouri		SLSF	1875	1877	Springfield and Western Missouri Railroad	
Tarkio Valley Railroad		CB&Q	1880	1900	Kansas City, St. Joseph and Council Bluffs Railroad	
Tebo and Neosho Railroad		MKT	1860	1872	Missouri, Kansas and Texas Railway	
Terminal Railroad of St. Louis			1880	1889	Terminal Railroad Association of St. Louis	
Terre Haute and Indianapolis Railroad		PRR	1902	1905	Vandalia Railroad	
Texas and St. Louis Railway		SSW	1881	1886	St. Louis, Arkansas and Texas Railway	
Toledo, St. Louis and Western Railroad		NKP		1923	New York, Chicago and St. Louis Railroad	
Tunnel Railroad of St. Louis			1878	1988	City of St. Louis (for MetroLink)	Owned by Terminal Railroad Association of St. Louis
Union Belt Line			1882	1882	Kansas City Belt Railway	
Union Depot Company			1875	1910	Kansas City Terminal Railway	
Union Depot Company of St. Louis			1874	1889	Terminal Railroad Association of St. Louis	
Union Depot Bridge and Terminal Railroad						
Union Pacific Railway		UP	1880	1898	Union Pacific Railroad	
Union Pacific Railway, Eastern Division		UP	1863	1869	Kansas Pacific Railway	
Union Railway and Transit Company of St. Louis			1874	1889	Terminal Railroad Association of St. Louis	
Union Terminal Railway	UT		1901			
Union Transit Company			1880	1884	Kansas City Belt Railway	
Vandalia Railroad		PRR	1905	1917	Pittsburgh, Cincinnati, Chicago and St. Louis Railroad	
Wabash Railroad	WAB	WAB	1942	1991	Norfolk and Western Railway	
Wabash Railroad		WAB	1889	1915	Wabash Railway	
Wabash Railway		WAB	1915	1942	Wabash Railroad	
Wabash and Grand River Railway	WGRY		1990	1993	Chillicothe–Brunswick Rail Maintenance Authority	
Wabash – Hannibal Bridge Company		WAB	1937	1943	Wabash Railroad	
Wabash, St. Louis and Pacific Railway		WAB	1879	1886	Omaha and St. Louis Railway, Wabash Western Railway	
Wabash Western Railway		WAB	1887	1889	Wabash Railroad	
Warrensburg and Pertle Springs Railroad						
Western Cable Railway						
Weston and Atchison Railroad		CB&Q	1859	1867	Missouri Valley Railroad	
Williamsville, Greenville and St. Louis Railway			1894			
Wyandotte, Kansas City and Northwestern Railway		MP	1872	1878	Kansas City and Eastern Railway	

Electric railways and predecessors

- Cape Girardeau – Jackson Interurban Railway
- East St. Louis and Suburban Railway
- Illinois Terminal Company
- Illinois Terminal Railroad (ITC)
- Interurban South Side Railway
- Kansas City, Clay County and St. Joseph Railway
- Kansas City Interurban Railway
- Kansas City, Kaw Valley Railroad
- Kansas City, Kaw Valley and Western Railway (KV&W, KVW)
- Kansas City Public Service Company
- Kansas City and Westport Belt Railway (KCWB)
- Missouri and Kansas Interurban Railway
- St. Francois County Electric Railroad
- St. Francois County Railroad
- St. Francois County Railway
- St. Joseph and Savannah Interurban Railway
- St. Louis and Florissant Railroad
- St. Louis and Suburban Railway
- Southwest Missouri Railroad Company
- Union Railway (Missouri) (St. Louis)
- Union Railroad (Missouri) (St. Joseph)
- West End Narrow Gauge Railroad

Heritage railways

- Kansas City Railroad Museum
