= Kansas City Railway =

Kansas City Railway may refer to:

- Kansas City Southern Railway, a Class I railroad in ten U.S. states
- Kansas City Terminal Railway, a Class III terminal railroad in Kansas
- Kansas City, Clinton and Springfield Railway, an abandoned railway in Kansas
