= CBRM =

CBRM may refer to:

- CBRM-FM, a radio retransmitter (98.3 FM) licensed to Medicine Hat, Alberta, Canada, retransmitting CBR
- Cape Breton Regional Municipality, Nova Scotia
- Chillicothe-Brunswick Rail Maintenance Authority
- Condition Based Risk Management, a schema used to manage business running investment
- Certified Business Relationship Manager, a professional designation offered by the Business Relationship Management Institute (BRMI)
