= Nevada and Minden Railway =

1885 to 1909 American rail line

Overview
- Locale: Missouri and Kansas
- Dates of operation: 1885–1909

Technical
- Track gauge: 4 ft 8 1/2 in (1,435 mm)
- Length: 73.71 mi (118.62 km)

The Nevada and Minden Railway was a rail line extending about 74 miles from Nevada, Missouri to Chetopa, Kansas. The line was completed in 1886, and the railroad was merged into its owner and operator, the Missouri Pacific Railway, in 1909.

== History ==
The Nevada and Minden Railway Company was created by certificate filed April 17, 1885, by change of name of the Nevada and Girard Railway, organized Sept 22, 1882. It was one of two companies organized for the task of building a railway southwest from Nevada, Missouri into Kansas, the other being the Nevada and Minden Railway Company of Kansas, incorporated December 14, 1885. The Nevada and Minden Railway Company would build the line from Nevada, Missouri southwest to the Missouri/Kansas state line, and the Nevada and Minden Railway Company of Kansas would build the portion of the line situated in Kansas. Both companies were controlled and operated by the Missouri Pacific Railway.

During the fall and winter of 1885-6 efforts were made by different citizens of Labette County, Kansas to secure extension of the railroad into their county, eventually settling on Chetopa as the final destination when that city donated land for right-of-way and yard/depot purposes. Thus the railroad’s final orientation was from Nevada through Bronaugh, Missouri and Pittsburg, Kansas to Chetopa, the work on the final piece starting in the Spring of 1886, and the line being completed April 6, 1886. The railway had about 32.56 miles of road in Missouri and 41.15 miles in Kansas, for a total of about 73.71.

On August 9, 1909, both companies and several others were consolidated into the Missouri Pacific. After many changes in ownership, the route was sold in 1991 to the South Kansas & Oklahoma Railroad. Much of the trackage has since been abandoned.
