= Kansas City, Memphis and Birmingham Railroad =

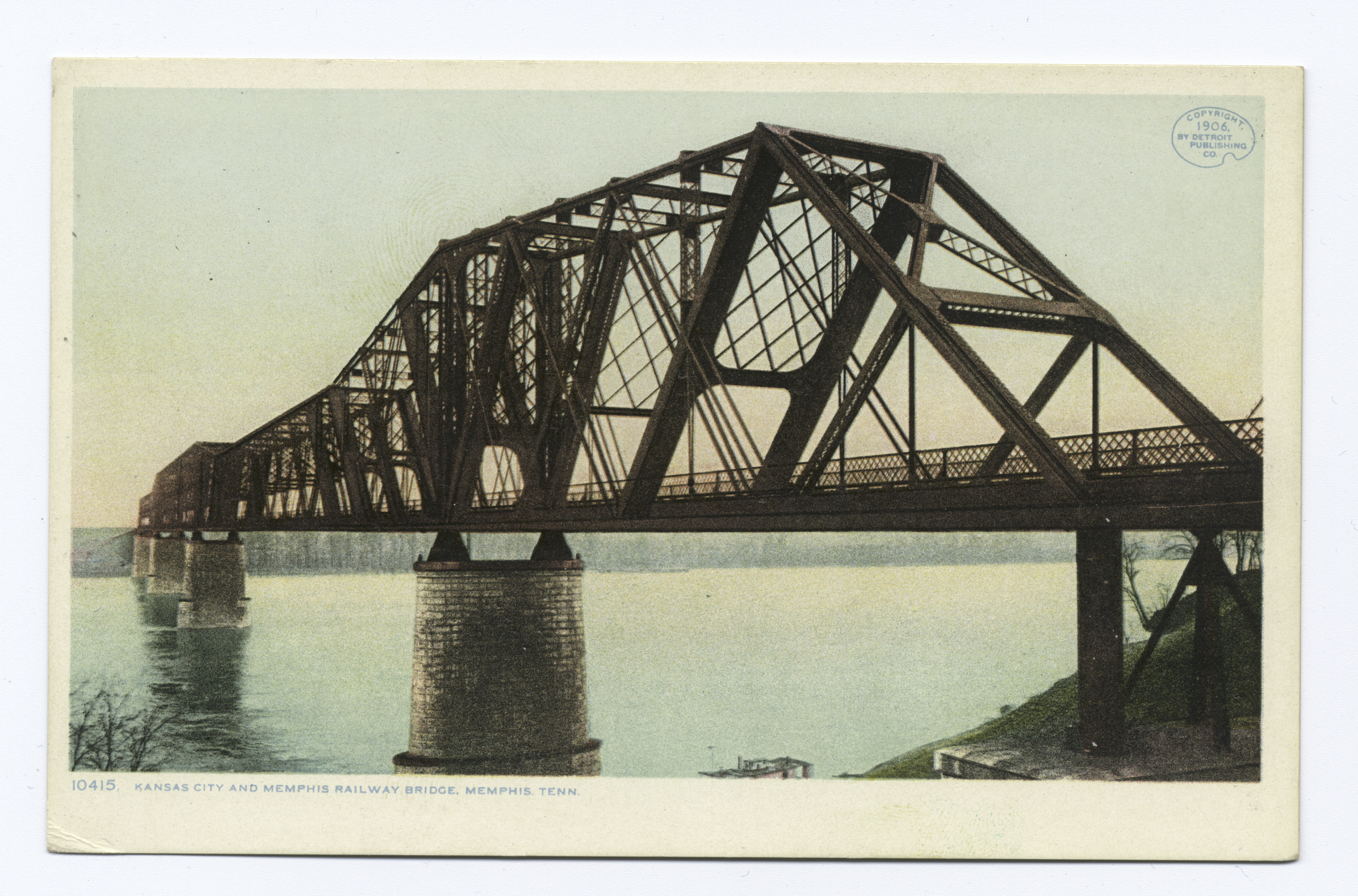
Bridge in Memphis

The Kansas City, Memphis & Birmingham Railroad is a historic railroad that operated in the southern United States.

The company was created by consolidation in 1887 from a line of the same name (which was originally incorporated in Mississippi on February 18, 1886) and the Memphis and Birmingham Railway. The KCM&B operated between Memphis, Tennessee and Birmingham, Alabama. The Kansas City, Fort Scott and Memphis Railroad owned 50% of the stock in the KCM&B and the line operated as an extension to the KCFS&M.

Both railroads were operationally absorbed into the St. Louis and San Francisco Railroad (the "Frisco") in 1896. In 1901 the KCFS&M was purchased by the Frisco and the KCM&B was leased by the Frisco in 1903. A formal transfer of KCM&B assets to the Frisco did not take place until 1928.
