= Kansas City, Clinton and Springfield Railway =

Abandoned rail line of United States

The Kansas City, Clinton and Springfield Railway ("KCC&SR"), also known as the Leaky Roof Railway, was a consolidation of earlier railroads. As of 1917, it had a mainline running from Ash Grove, Missouri through Clinton, Missouri to Olathe, Kansas, almost 155 miles. It has since been abandoned.

== History ==
The KCC&SR was incorporated February 10, 1885 and February 12, 1885 under the laws of Missouri and Kansas respectively, as a subsidiary of the Kansas City, Fort Scott, and Gulf Railroad. Its background is complicated. Starting at the beginning, two railroads called The Lawrence and Pleasant Hill Railway Company and the St. Louis, Lawrence and Denver Railroad Company consolidated to form the Saint Louis, Lawrence and Denver Railroad Company under articles dated April 30, 1870. That Saint Louis, Lawrence and Denver Railroad Company consolidated with the Pleasant Hill and Lawrence Branch of the Pacific Railroad Company to form a new Saint Louis, Lawrence and Denver Railroad Company by agreement of November 10, 1870. That Saint Louis, Lawrence and Denver Railroad Company and the Lawrence and Carbondale Railroad Company consolidated to form a new Saint Louis, Lawrence and Denver Railroad Company on January 10, 1873. That Saint Louis, Lawrence and Denver Railroad Company changed its name to the Saint Louis, Lawrence and Western Railroad Company on February 26, 1874, but was sold at foreclosure on February 23, 1877, with much of its mileage going to the unrelated Kansas City, Topeka and Western Railroad Company, a predecessor of the Atchison, Topeka and Santa Fe Railway or “AT&SF”. An entity called the Pleasant Hill and De Soto Railroad Company acquired some of the foreclosure trackage, and it consolidated with the Kansas City, Clinton and Springfield Railroad Company to form the KCC&SR on January 20, 1885.

Overall, the mileage of the road came from the trackage of the Saint Louis, Lawrence and Western Railroad acquired in foreclosure, plus new milage constructed, and mileage purchased from the related Kansas City, Fort Scott and Memphis Railroad, but minus trackage sold to the Kansas City, Fort Scott and Memphis Railway, as well as trackage abandoned. A snapshot of the company as of June 30, 1917 shows the railroad with a single track, standard gauge mainline running generally northwesterly from Ash Grove through Clinton to Olathe, 154.645 miles. Having 18.675 miles of yard tracks and sidings, total owned trackage was 173.320 miles. The railway had connections with AT&SF at Olathe; with the Kansas City, Fort Scott and Memphis Railway (as leased to the St. Louis-San Francisco Railway, known as the “Frisco”) at Olathe and Ash Grove; with the Missouri, Kansas and Texas Railway (later the Missouri–Kansas–Texas Railroad at Clinton and Harrisonville, Missouri; with the Missouri Pacific Railroad at Harrisonville and Pleasant Hill, Missouri; and, with the Frisco at Belton, Harlan Junction, Harrisonville, Lowry City, and Tracy Junction, Missouri. At that time, the railroad had 12 steam locomotives, 31 freight cars, 9 passenger cars, and 13 cars of work equipment.

The nickname "Leaky Roof" originated due to the somewhat-decrepit condition of the freight cars utilized by the KCC&SR. The cars worked fine for shipping the tiles produced by a major customer, since rain could not harm them; but, a flour mill refused to use the railroad to ship its porous bags due to all those leaky roofs, and the word got around.

The KCC&SR came under the control of the Frisco in 1901 along with the rest of the Kansas City, Fort Scott and Memphis system, and was finally absorbed into the Frisco in 1928.

After consolidation with the Frisco, the route was deemed somewhat redundant to the parallel and better-constructed Frisco "Highline", with the two railroads intersecting at many places. Seeking to cut costs, the Frisco chose to consolidate the two lines into one by keeping the track of whichever railroad had the favorable route between these numerous crossings, with the less favorable sections then being removed. Service continued over these portions of the line with a daily except Sunday local until the mid-1970s, when dam construction and bridge fires ended through-service on the route between Kansas City and Springfield, Missouri. Operating for a while as a North and South branch line, services were cut and the line was, section by section, successively abandoned. Although the rails are now gone, traces can be found along Route 7 and Route 13; however, along most sections, little remains to be seen. A tiny portion of the old mainline continues to exist in Belton.

== See also ==
- List of predecessors of the St. Louis–San Francisco Railway.
