= Bevier and Southern Railroad =

Defunct American railroad

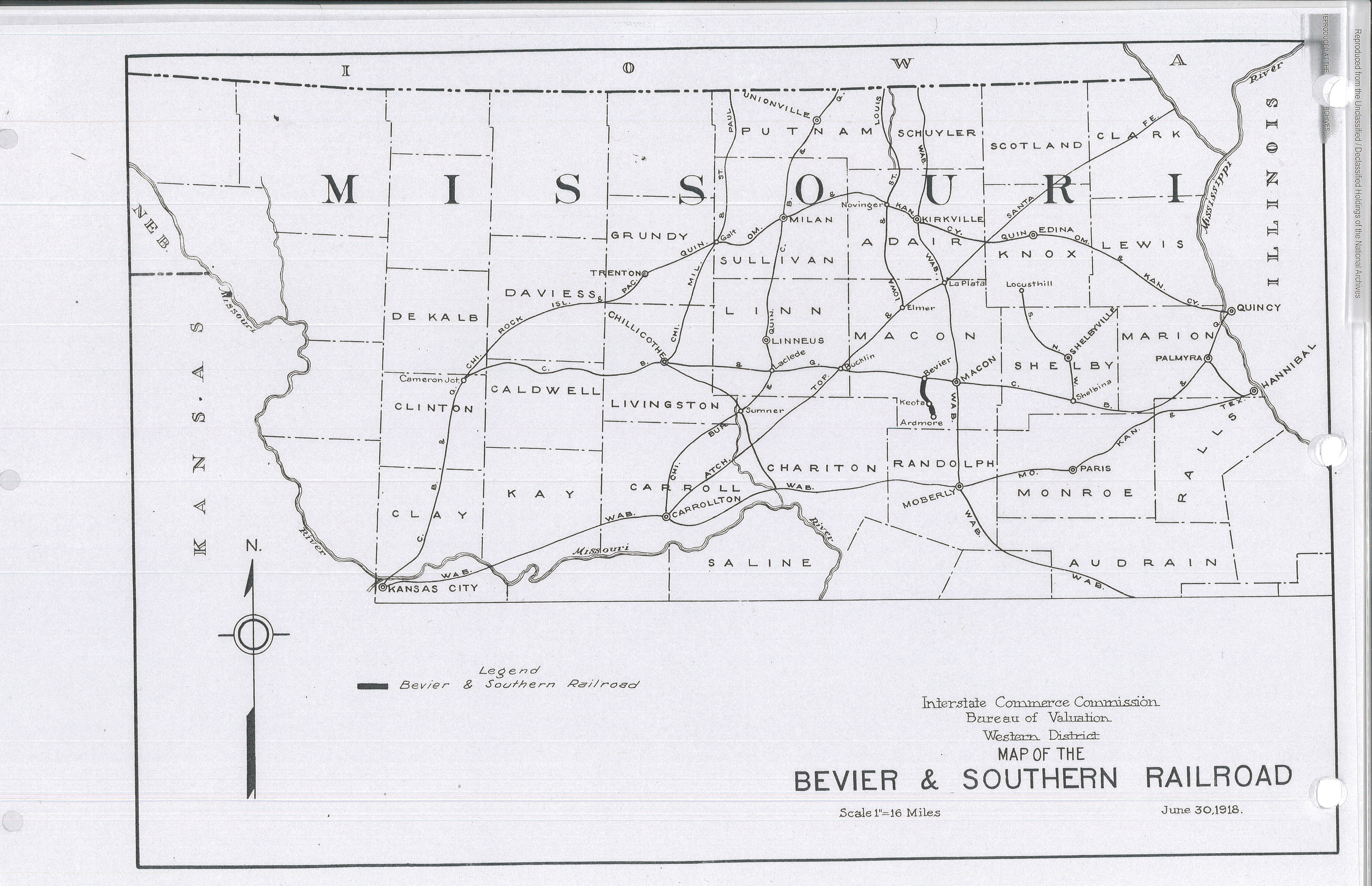
1918 map of the railroad

The Bevier and Southern Railroad (reporting mark BVS) was a United States railroad that existed from September 28, 1914, when the Missouri and Louisiana Railroad divided (the Missouri portion of it becoming the BVS), until 1982 when the railroad went out of business and was abandoned. The railroad measured 9.18 miles and ran from a connection with the Chicago, Burlington and Quincy Railroad, which was Burlington Northern at the time B&S abandoned in 1982, just west of Bevier, Missouri and ran south to Binkley, Missouri. Primary traffic along the line was outbound coal from coal mines in the area and the railroad's slogan was "Have Train Will Haul."

In 1961, the railroad still relied exclusively on steam locomotives (2 Moguls 2-6-0 and 2 Mikados 2-8-2) to haul coal hoppers to its mainline connection.

The Burlington Northern Railroad, now part of the BNSF Railway, took over the line in the 1990s, and expanded and rebuilt it to serve a coal-fired power plant at the Thomas Hill Reservoir.
