= St. Louis and Hannibal Railroad =

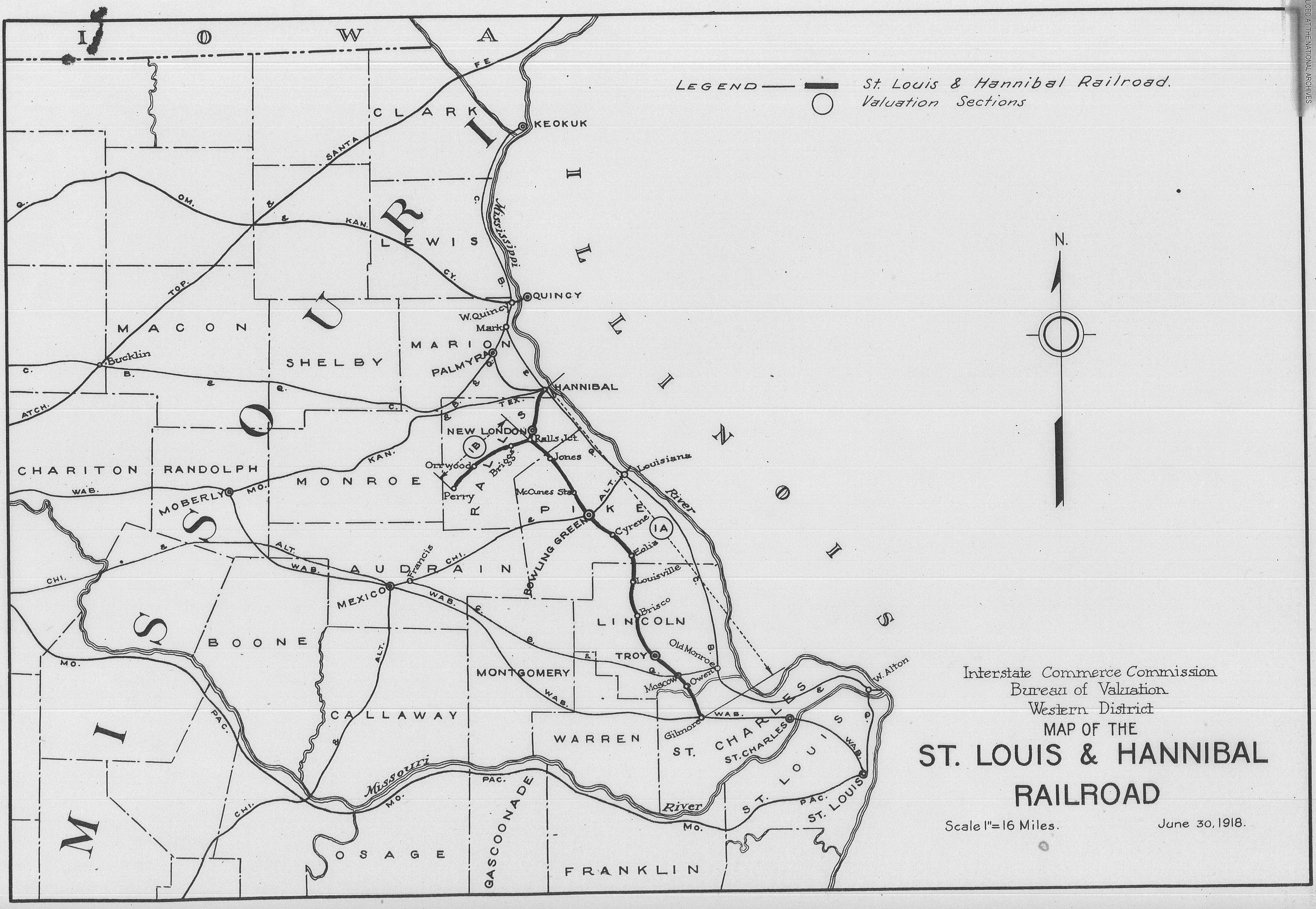
1916 map of the railroad

St. Louis and Hannibal Railroad was originally incorporated as the St. Louis & Keokuk RR on February 16, 1857. The Civil war and various depressions and recessions prevented its actual construction until 1871. Beginning in its early construction, it was largely financed and (later) owned by John Insley Blair, Blairstown, New Jersey (1802–1899), and Moses Taylor, New York banker (1806–1882). Taylor died in 1882 and his protégé Percy Pyne remained on various boards.

The railroad was eventually known as "The Short Line".

On February 7, 1884, the St. Louis, Hannibal & Keokuk went into receivership and was sold to Blair on December 8, 1885, for $370,000. At that point it became the St. Louis & Hannibal Railway Co. The Perry Branch was surveyed and graded in the 1870s but was not built until 1891-92. The first train reached Perry July 1892. This was a dual expansion in that track was extended from Oakwood into Hannibal and a brick depot was built at 501 S. Main Street in 1892. This would be the final configuration; Mainline - Hannibal to Gilmore, Missouri, and Branchline - Ralls Jct. (New London, Missouri) to Perry.

In 1893 the St. Louis, Hannibal and Kansas City (Perry Branchline original name) merged into the StL&HRy.

John Blair died in 1899, at age 97, with an estimated estate of $70–90 million. His son, Dewitt Clinton Blair then assumed control. He died June 3, 1915. In 1917 the St. Louis & Hannibal went into receivership again and was sold to Robert LeRoy on behalf of Blair's grandson, C. Ledyard Blair for $30,000. It then was reorganized into the St. Louis & Hannibal Railroad.

Around November 1919, the "Short Line" was sold to John Ringling (of Ringling Bros. & Barnum & Bailey Circus fame) for approximately $325,000. Between 1919 and 1930 he invested a further similar amount in rebuilding efforts. The depression was not kind to the St. Louis & Hannibal and Ringling. So, in 1932 the lower end of the mainline (below Bowling Green to Gilmore) was abandoned to save the rest of the system. John Ringling died December 2, 1936. His nephew John Ringling North assumed ownership of the railroad and circus interests.

Only 5 miles of the southern mainline was saved and it became the St. Louis & Troy Railroad running from Troy to Moscow Mills, Missouri, and operated until October 1, 1960. It served local industries and was connected to the Burlington line by a siding at Moscow Mills. The St. Louis & Troy line was owned largely by local businessmen in cooperation with the Ringling family until 1944 when 25 businessmen solidified their ownership by purchasing it outright.

Beginning in 1933, the StL&HRR began operating four Mack AD model railbuses to bolster passenger service. It also ran dedicated freight trains as well. It helped for a time but eventually the owners and management abandoned the Perry Branch in 1943. The mainline was abandoned as well in 1944. The company was finally dissolved March 12, 1945.

The St. Louis & Troy remained in operation but was finally abandoned February 1, 1961. This was the last remainder of the line which began life in 1857 and construction began in 1871.

The railroad was largely not very profitable during its entire life as it served a remote area with small revenues. The building of hard surface roads (US Hwy 61), the ever-expanding Foster Bus Line routes, growing trucking industry and finally the personal automobile spelled its demise.
