= Osage Valley and Southern Kansas Railroad =

Defunct American railroad

The Osage Valley and Southern Kansas Railroad was chartered in 1857 by the Missouri Legislature to run from a point on the Pacific Railroad near present-day Tipton, Missouri, to Emporia, Kansas. The charter was modified in 1858 to include an extension north to Boonville, Missouri. Grading on the line was completed to Versailles, Missouri, in 1861, but was halted due to the American Civil War. After the war the Bonneville to Tipton portion was completed in 1868, and leased to the Pacific Railroad. In 1870, portions of the line were graded from Warsaw, Missouri, north to Cole Camp, Missouri.

== Default ==
All construction ended in 1872, when the line defaulted on bond payments. The Warsaw portion became the property of Benton County, Missouri, and was later used, in 1880, as the road bed for the narrow gauge Sedalia, Warsaw and Southern Railway between Sedalia and Warsaw.

== Reorganization ==
The line between Tipton and Versailles, Missouri, was reorganized in 1880 and 1881, as the Boonville, St. Louis and Southern Railway, and was then leased to Jay Gould's Missouri Pacific Railway.

== Closure ==
The line operated until June 1935, when successor Missouri Pacific Railroad asked permission of the Interstate Commerce Commission to abandon the line. The last train operated to Versailles on April 30, 1936, and the entire property was torn up except for a bit at the Boonville end, which followed 2nd Street.
