= Tebo and Neosho Railroad =

American railroad (1860–1870)

The Tebo and Neosho Railroad was incorporated on January 16, 1860. It ran from Sedalia, Missouri, to Nevada, Missouri. The railroad was bought and merged into the Missouri Kansas and Texas Railroad on October 11, 1870.

== See also ==
- Missouri-Kansas-Texas Railroad
