= Mississippi Valley and Western Railway =

Defunct American railway

Overview
- Headquarters: Canton, Missouri, U.S.
- Dates of operation: January 25, 1871–June 25, 1875
- Successor: St. Louis, Keokuk and North Western Railway

Technical
- Track gauge: Standard
- Length: 47.18 miles (75.93 km)

The Mississippi Valley and Western Railway (MV&W) was the name of three different shortline railroads which operated in the U.S. states of Iowa and Missouri. The first company was formed on January 25, 1871, and existed for just five days before merging with a much larger road (itself the product of the merger with three other railroads). On January 20, 1873, two other railroads merged with the MV&W to create a second consolidated company. This last railroad went bankrupt on August 7, 1874, having constructed only a minimal amount of track. The bankrupt firm was sold to the St. Louis, Keokuk and North Western Railway.

== History ==
=== Missouri railroad predecessors ===
On February 27, 1851, the state of Missouri issued a charter to the Canton and Bloomfield Railroad to build a rail line from Canton, Missouri, to Bloomfield, Iowa. There is no indication that any equipment was purchased. However, the company did partially grade about 20 miles (32 km) of bed from Canton to the west.

On February 17, 1857, the state of Missouri issued a charter to the Mississippi and Missouri River Air Line Railroad, giving that railroad extensive privileges to build a rail line from the Mississippi to Missouri river in 10 northern counties of Missouri. (Note: Formally, the railroad was authorized to begin its line at any point it chose within 18 miles (29 km) of the mouth of the Des Moines River. The line was to run westerly toward the Missouri River, never straying more than 30 miles (48 km) from the northern border of Missouri. The western terminus was to be on the Missouri River, at any point not nearer than 15 miles (24 km) nor more than 30 miles (48 km) from the state's northern border.)

The Canton and Bloomfield Railroad was sold to the Mississippi and Missouri River Air Line on June 25, 1860. The Air Line completed about 15 miles (24 km) of track between April and June 1861. But work ceased when the United States government seized the railroad's equipment as part of the American Civil War effort. In 1868, the company obtained more right of way to the west, and in 1869 graded a track bed 60 miles (97 km) to Glenwood, Missouri. The company also acquired a 14-mile (23 km) right of way from Canton to West Quincy in 1868, and by early 1870 had graded this as well. but no track was laid on either bed.

On February 18, 1865, the state of Missouri issued a charter to the Alexandria, Canton, La Grange and West Quincy Railroad, to build a line from Alexandria, Missouri, south through Canton and La Grange to West Quincy, Missouri. Although the company conducted surveys of its route, no other construction work was done. On April 1, 1870, this railroad merged with the Mississippi and Missouri River Air Line (effective April 8, 1870) to form the similarly named Mississippi and Missouri River Air-Line Railroad. The company contracted with the Missouri Railway Construction Company, which built 14 miles (23 km) of standard gauge, single-line track from West Quincy to Canton. The Air-Line turned over nearly all of its bonds to the construction company in order to pay for this construction.

=== The first and second Mississippi Valley and Western Railways ===
On January 25, 1871, the Mississippi Valley and Western Railway was incorporated in the state of Iowa, with headquarters at Canton, Missouri. The charter permitted the railroad to build a line from Keokuk, Iowa, to the Iowa-Missouri border. The southern terminus of the line had to be within 5 miles (8.0 km) of Alexandria, Missouri. There is no indication that it had any assets other than its charter.

Five days later, the MV&W was merged with the Mississippi and Missouri River Air-Line Railroad to form a new MV&W. This gave the consolidated railroad access to markets in both Missouri and Iowa. The merged firm was incorporated on March 10, 1871, and completed just under 14 miles (23 km) of standard gauge, single-line track from Canton to Buena Vista, Iowa, by the end of 1872.

=== Third Mississippi Valley and Western Railway ===
Meanwhile, on January 15, 1870, the state of Missouri chartered the Clarksville and Western Railroad. It had the authority to build a rail line from Clarksville, Missouri, west to Bowling Green, Missouri, where it would meet with the Louisiana and Missouri River Railroad (whose line ran from Bowling Green to Louisiana, Missouri). The company obtained about 60 miles (97 km) of right of way between St. Peters, Missouri, and Mud Lick Prairie (a site a few miles north of Louisiana, Missouri). By the end of 1872, it had graded some of this bed, and built or partially built several bridges on the line.

The state of Missouri next chartered the Mississippi Valley Railroad on May 24, 1871, giving it authority to run a line from Hannibal, Missouri, to Moody, Missouri. On August 8, 1872, the directors of the railroad declared their intention to continue the line from Hannibal south to Clarksville in order to connect with the Clarksville and Western. Little actual work was done, however. The company only completed a preliminary survey of its route, and obtained only a limited (and indeterminate) amount of right of way by late 1872.

On January 20, 1873, the Clarksville & Western and the Mississippi Valley consolidated with the MV&W to form a third company, also known as the MV&W. (Note: It retained its headquarters in Canton.) By 1874, the firm had constructed 13.25 miles (21.32 km) of track from West Quincy to Hannibal. Its total completed track was just 47.18 miles (75.93 km). Potentially, the railroad had the right to construct a 392-mile (631 km) main and branch line from Quincy through Keokuk to Brownville, Nebraska.

== Default and sale ==
Ohio railroad executive and investor Amasa Stone invested in the MV&W when it formed on January 20, 1873. The MV&W defaulted on its bonds, and on August 7, 1874, was turned over to a receiver—which turned out to be Amasa Stone. Stone put the railroad up for sale, and it was sold to his brother, Andros Stone, on April 14, 1875. Six days later, Andros Stone sold the railroad to the St. Louis, Keokuk and North Western Railway (SLK&NW), which had been formed by Andros Stone and others to acquire the assets of the bankrupt line. The sale closed June 22, 1875. Andros Stone received $165,000 ($4,700,000 in 2024 dollars) in cash, $600,000 ($17,200,000 in 2024 dollars) in bonds (with a maturity due in two years at 7 percent interest), and $471,800 ($13,500,000 in 2024 dollars) in common and preferred stock.

== Court decisions ==
The bankruptcy of the MV&W lead to two important legal cases.

In Mississippi Valley and Western Railway Co. v. United States Express Co., a fast-freight firm, the United States Express Co., sued the railroad and its trustees seeking payment for services rendered. With the railroad bankrupt, it sought to reclaim these funds from the railroad's bondholders—who had received payment in the railroad's final months (while U.S. Express went unpaid). But the Supreme Court of Illinois denied the claim, noting that a lender was entitled to payment until a receiver was appointed. A receiver had no authority to seize payments made to the lender prior to the declaration of insolvency.

A second case, Barney v. Keokuk, was decided the same year by the Supreme Court of the United States. The city of Keokuk had filled in about 200 feet (61 m) of the Mississippi River with stone and dirt. Several railroads, including the Mississippi Valley and Western Railway Company, laid track on this "reclaimed land". A local landowner, shut off from the river by this construction, sued, demanding removal of the railroad tracks, wharves, and warehouse erected between his land and the river. The Supreme Court noted that the public held title to the soil below the high-water mark on a river. Under the peculiarities of Iowa law, a city had the right to erect a street on reclaimed land erected on this publicly held riverbed. Iowa law gave railroads the right to run on the streets, and thus the tracks were permissible. (Note: Wharves could also be constructed there, under the same logic and law. But a private warehouse could not, and the Supreme Court ordered it removed.)

== Bibliography ==
- American Railway and Supply Directory for 1874-5. Boston: Greenough-Jones, & Co. 1874. hdl:2027/njp.32101066799097.
- Chicago, Burlington & Quincy Railroad Company (1913). Corporate History of the Chicago, Burlington & Quincy Railroad Company and Affiliated Companies (as of Date June 30, 1917) Pursuant to Interstate Commerce Commission Valuation Order No. 20: Under Act of Congress Approved March 1, 1913. Chicago: Chicago, Burlington & Quincy Railroad Company.
- Farnham, Henry P. (2006). The Law of Waters and Water Rights: International, National, State, Municipal, and Individual Including Irrigation, Drainage, and Municipal Water Supply. Clark, N.J.: Lawbook Exchange. ISBN 9781584776895.
- Interstate Commerce Commission (1928). Decisions of the Interstate Commerce Commission of the United States (Valuation Reports). October, 1927. Interstate Commerce Commission Reports. Vol. 134 (Report). Washington, D.C.: U.S. Government Printing Office. hdl:2027/uc1.b2911076.
- Missouri Railroad Commission (1881). Combined Fifth and Sixth Annual Reports of the Railroad Commissioners of the State of Missouri, Being for the Years 1879 and 1880 (Report). Jefferson City, Mo.: Tribune Printing Company.
