= South Kansas and Oklahoma Railroad =

Railway line in the United States

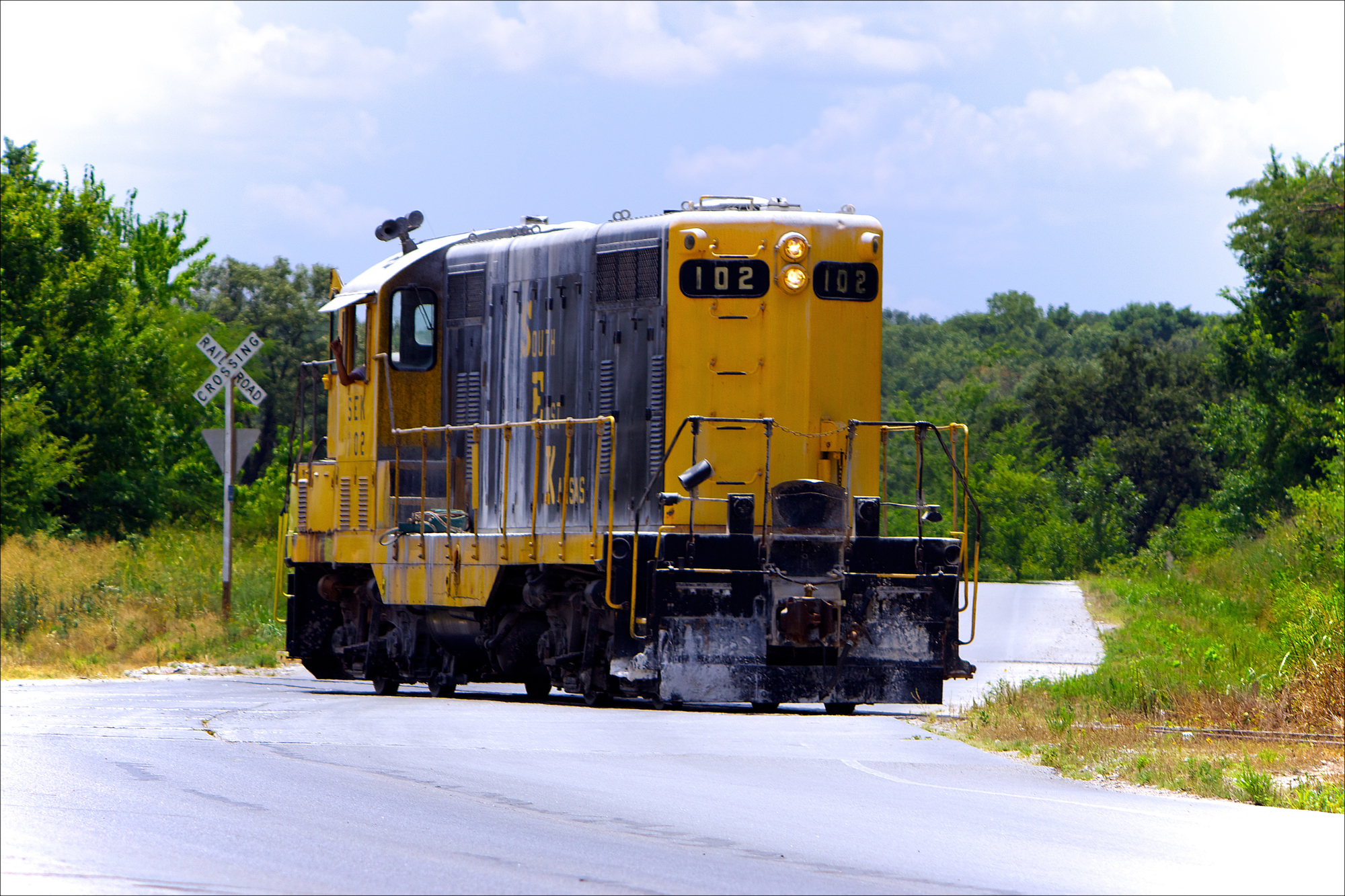
- #102, an EMD GP7 still in Southeast Kansas Railroad markings

Overview
- Headquarters: Cherryvale, Kansas
- Reporting mark: SKOL
- Locale: Kansas, Missouri and Oklahoma
- Dates of operation: 1991–

Technical
- Track gauge: 4 ft 8 1/2 in (1,435 mm)
- Length: 593.74 miles (955.53 km)

South Kansas and Oklahoma Railroad (reporting mark SKOL) is a short line railroad which operates 593.74 miles (955.53 km) of rail lines in Kansas, Oklahoma and Missouri that used to belong to Missouri Pacific, Frisco and Santa Fe lines. SKOL is a unit of Watco.

== History ==
=== Southeast Kansas Railroad ===
The Southeast Kansas Railroad (SEKR), incorporated in Kansas on March 17, 1987, became Watco's first short line. The railway ran about 104 miles from Coffeyville, Kansas to near Nevada, Missouri, at which point it had a connection with the Union Pacific.

=== SKOL ===
The South Kansas and Oklahoma Railroad was formed under Kansas Law on November 9, 1990. It originally acquired 287 miles of rail lines from the Santa Fe. SEKR merged with SKOL effective January 1, 1999. The line has gone through a number of subsequent acquisitions, leases and abandonments. The current SKOL encompasses 593.74 miles of track.

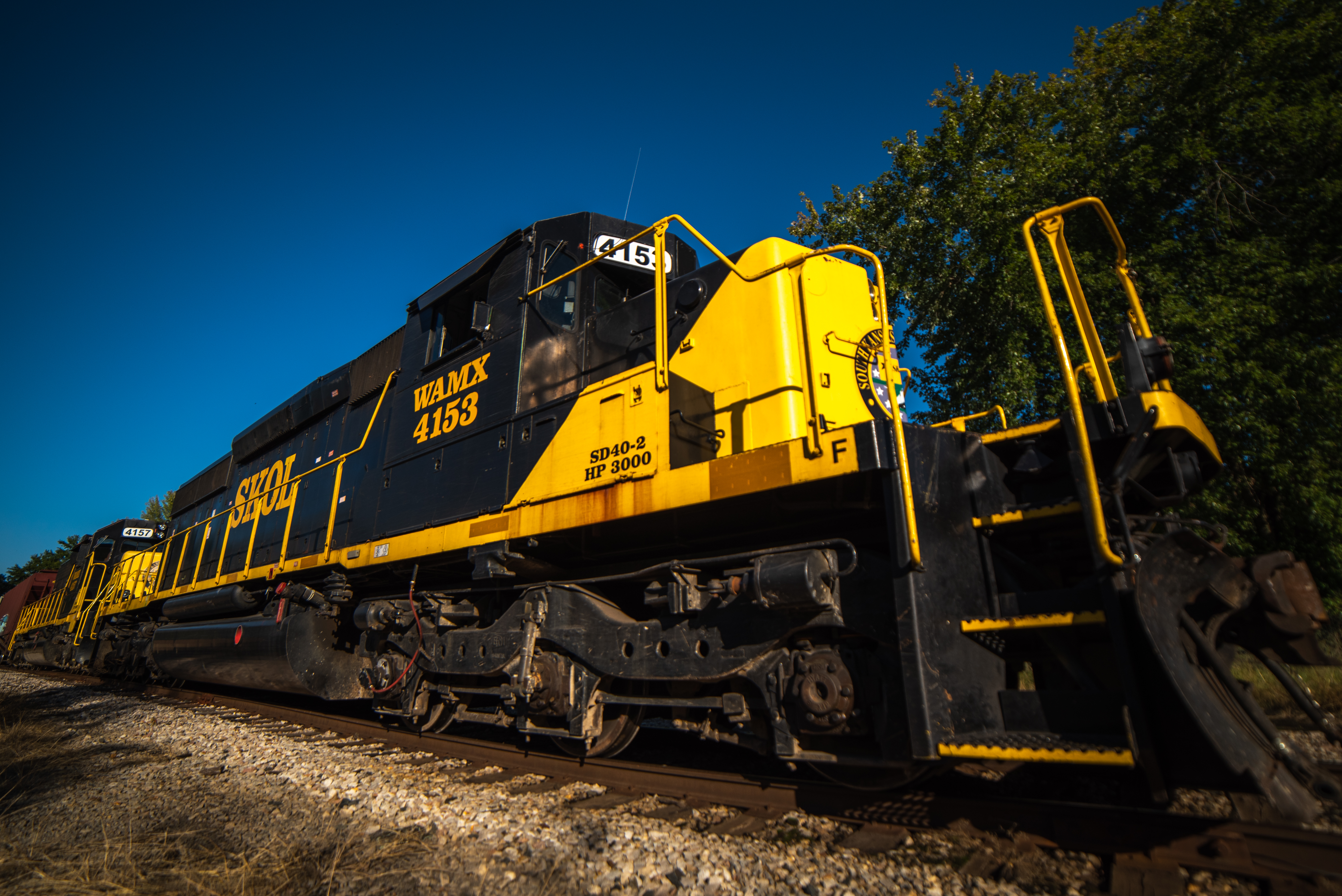
A Southern Kansas and Oklahoma Railroad locomotive parked in Pittsburg, Kansas

=== Interchanges ===
SKOL has interchange points at: Coffeyville, KS- UP; Columbus, KS – BNSF; Pittsburg, KS – CPKC; Wichita, KS – KO; Winfield, KS – BNSF & UP; Tulsa, OK – BNSF, SLWC, & UP via BNSF; and, Tulsa Port of Catoosa, OK – PC.

=== Rail lines ===
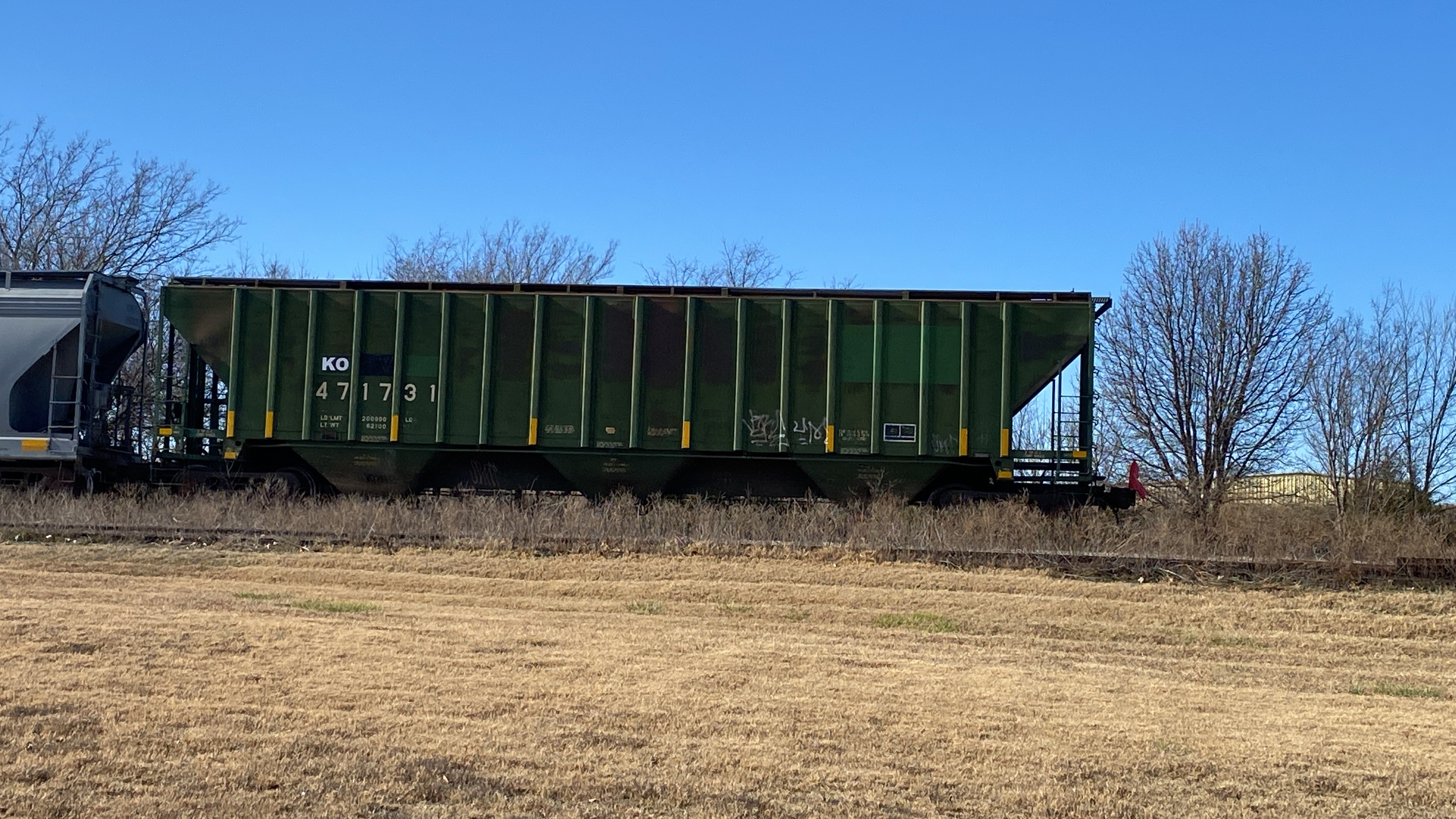
The last hopper car on the South Kansas & Oklahoma Railroad in Owasso, Oklahoma, December 28, 2021

Rail lines of the present SKOL include:

1. Tulsa, Oklahoma to Humboldt, Kansas
2. Cherryvale, Kansas to Oxford, Kansas
3. Cherryvale to Sherwin, Kansas to Liberal, Missouri
4. Cherryvale to Coffeyville, Kansas
5. Sherwin to Columbus, Kansas
6. Owasso, Oklahoma to Catoosa, Oklahoma and Tulsa Ports

The only part of the former SEKR system that still operates is Sherwin to Liberal.

SKOL was honored as Regional Railroad of the Year for 2008 by rail industry magazine Railway Age.

Preceded by Florida East Coast Railway	Regional Railroad of the Year; 2008	Succeeded by Wisconsin and Southern Railroad
Preceded by Lake State Railway	Regional Railroad of the Year; 2022	Succeeded by ArcelorMittal Infrastructure Canada (AMIC) Railway
