= Kansas City, Fort Scott and Memphis Railroad =

Railways system in the United States

Overview
- Locale: Kansas, Missouri, Arkansas, Tennessee, Mississippi, Alabama and Oklahoma
- Dates of operation: 1865–1928

Technical
- Track gauge: 4 ft 8 1/2 in (1,435 mm)
- Length: 881.19 mi (1,418.14 km)

The Kansas City, Fort Scott and Memphis Railroad (“KCFS&M”) was a railway system which, at its maximum extent, operated across Kansas, Missouri, Arkansas, Tennessee, Mississippi, Alabama and Oklahoma, a total of over 881 miles (1,418 kilometres). Its predecessor company started in 1865, and another railroad assumed ownership in 1928.

== History ==
=== Kansas and Neosho Valley Railroad ===
The railway system began as the Kansas and Neosho Valley Railroad in March 1865. The original ambitious plans called for the line to extend south from Kansas City along the Neosho Valley of eastern Kansas, through what was then Indian Territory (now Oklahoma), and continue to the Gulf of Mexico. Trackage from Kansas City to Olathe, Kansas, a distance of 21 miles, was built by December 1868.

=== Missouri River, Fort Scott & Gulf Railroad ===
However, before the railroad even reached Olathe, its ownership had changed, and its name had become the Missouri River, Fort Scott & Gulf Railroad (“MRFS&G”). Its objective did not change, and the railway built another 100 miles to Fort Scott, Kansas, arriving by December 1869. To secure the right to cross Indian Territory, the MRFS&G was in a race to be the first railway to reach the Indian Territory border. However, it made the decision to accept financial incentives from the town of Baxter Springs, Kansas to build to that location, arriving by May 1870. The line at this point was about 160 miles in total length. However, the detour cost the railroad the race to the border, and hence the dream of transiting Indian Territory to the Gulf. Still, the railroad system did later make some minor inroads into Indian Territory, with the Kansas City, Fort Scott and Memphis Railroad building to Miami, Oklahoma in 1896, and the Kansas City, Fort Scott and Memphis Railway extending this line to Afton, Oklahoma in 1901.

=== Kansas City, Fort Scott, and Gulf Railroad ===
The MRFS&G was reorganized in 1879. It was combined with several minor branch lines and changed names to become the Kansas City, Fort Scott, and Gulf Railroad. Its trains proceeded to reach Springfield, Missouri from Fort Scott, but did so via leased lines.

=== Kansas City, Springfield and Memphis Railroad ===
A subsidiary called the Kansas City, Springfield and Memphis Railroad, incorporated March 31, 1883, constructed a line from Springfield to the west bank of the Mississippi River across from Memphis, Tennessee, arriving in the 1883 timeframe. However, without a bridge over the river to Memphis, train traffic had to be ferried into town.

=== Kansas City, Memphis and Birmingham Railroad ===
On April 10, 1886, the system acquired the remnants of several failed attempts to construct a line from Memphis to Birmingham, Alabama, including actual construction from Memphis to Holly Springs, Mississippi. These assets were added to its Kansas City, Memphis and Birmingham Railroad subsidiary. That company got the line to Birmingham, and opened it for business on October 17, 1887.

=== Consolidation into the KCFS&M ===
The Kansas City, Fort Scott and Memphis Railroad Company was incorporated in Kansas on April 20, 1888. A subsidiary of the Kansas City, Fort Scott, and Gulf Railroad, it was a consolidation of The Kansas City, Fort Scott and Springfield Railroad together with the Kansas City, Springfield and Memphis Railroad.

The KCFS&M started construction on a grand bridge over the Mississippi to Memphis on November 7, 1888, and completed it on April 6, 1892. Originally known as the Memphis Bridge, that bridge today is known as the Frisco Bridge and has been designated as a National Historic Civil Engineering Landmark.

At this point, the main line of the KCFS&M extended from Kansas City through Fort Scott, Springfield, and the state of Arkansas to Memphis, and then through the state of Mississippi to Birmingham. Ultimately, taking into account subsidiaries, the branch to Oklahoma, and other trackage, this railroad system came to own 881.19 miles (1,418.14 kilometres) of road. The whole system came to be known as the “Memphis Route.”

=== Kansas City, Fort Scott and Memphis Railway ===
Technically, the KCFS&M made one further corporate change, when on August 12, 1901, it was sold to the Kansas City, Fort Scott and Memphis Railway incorporated June 14, 1901. The St. Louis-San Francisco Railway (known as the “Frisco”) had purchased a controlling interest that year, and on August 23, 1901, the whole system was leased to the Frisco. But the Frisco did not assume formal ownership of the system until September 1, 1928.

== See also ==
- List of predecessors of the Kansas City, Fort Scott and Memphis Railway
