= Chillicothe–Brunswick Rail Maintenance Authority =

Railroad in Missouri, United States

The Chillicothe–Brunswick Rail Maintenance Authority (reporting mark CBRM) was a class III railroad that operated in north-central Missouri.

It ran from Chillicothe, Missouri, southeastward through the communities of Sumner and Triplett on its way to Brunswick, Missouri.

The 37 miles (60 km) of railroad was originally built for the Wabash Railroad and later became part of the Norfolk and Western Railway (N&W) before the N&W abandoned it in 1983. The rail line had the following interchanges:

- Chillicothe - The Iowa, Chicago and Eastern Railroad, formerly the Chicago, Milwaukee, St. Paul and Pacific Railroad, later the Soo Line Railroad, and most recently I&M Rail Link.
- Sumner - The BNSF Railway, formerly the Chicago, Burlington and Quincy Railroad, and later the Burlington Northern.

An interchange existed in Brunswick with the Norfolk Southern Railway, formerly the Wabash Railroad and later the Norfolk and Western Railway before the railroad was abandoned between Sumner and Brunswick.

== History ==
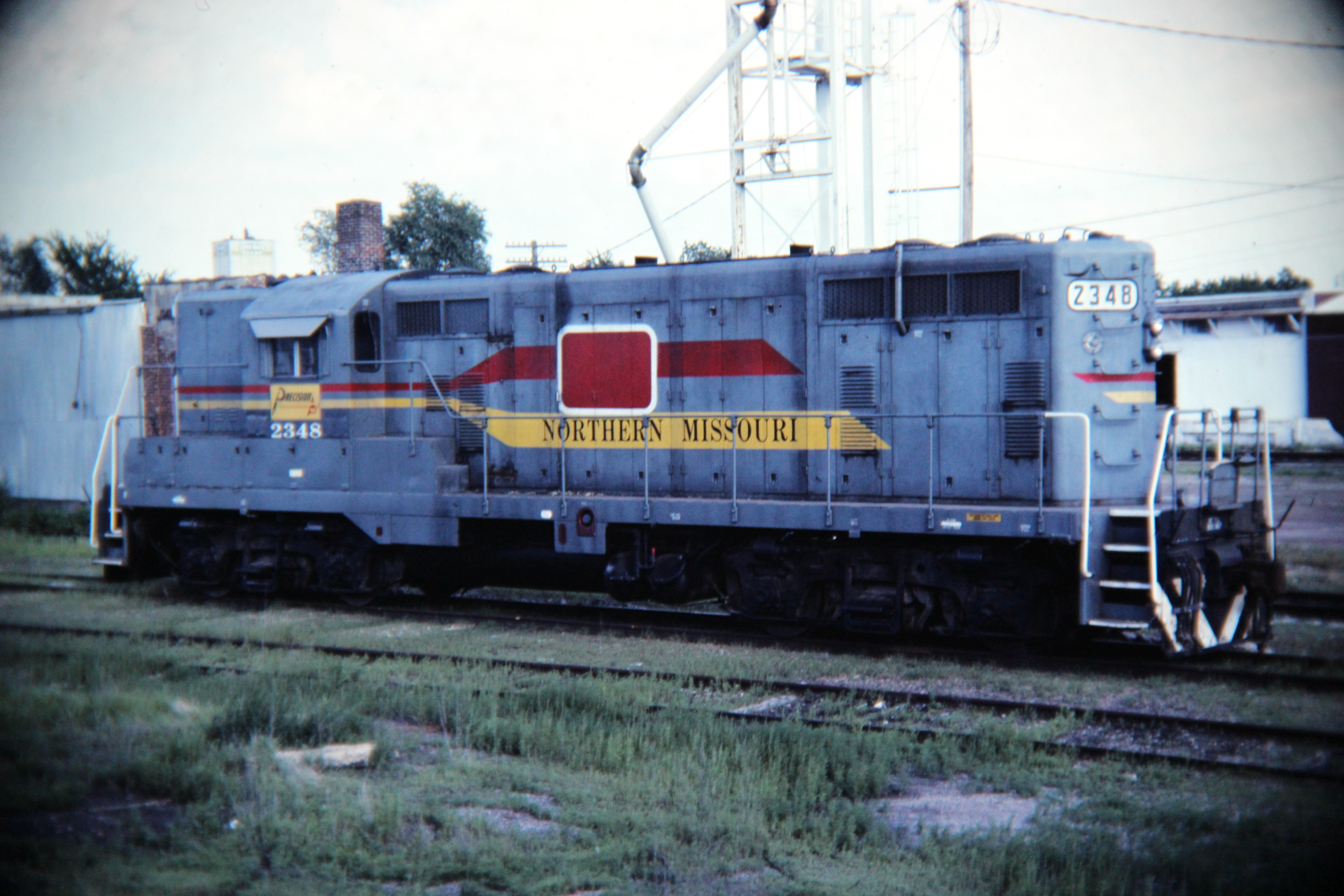
CBRM #2348, an EMD GP7, in Chillicothe

A community economic development authority, Green Hills Rural Development, Inc., bought the 37 miles (60 km) in 1985 from Norfolk Southern Railway as part of an economic development strategy. Green Hills leased the rail line to a private contractor before beginning operation of the line through an affiliated non-profit corporation known as CBRM in January 1986.

The line was leased to the Wabash and Grand River Railway on April 1, 1990, but returned to the CBRM after this lease terminated on December 1, 1993; the 1993 floods throughout the midwest having caused significant damage to the tracks and impacting W&GR operations.

The CBRM operated the line through the 1990s, seeing a consistent pattern of 10 to 20% traffic growth per year, and helping to develop a 67-acre (27 ha) industrial park with new industries, creating over 300 new full-time jobs and attracting in excess of $57 million in new private sector investment to the area served by the rail line. The rail line also attracted a regional grain terminal at its southern end. Despite having a book value well in excess of $1.5 million, the line was "sold" to the city of Chillicothe by Green Hills for $32,500 without the benefit of open public bidding.

On December 8, 2006, the Chillicothe Constitution-Tribune reported that the city of Chillicothe had sold the majority of the railroad (approximately 30 miles or 48 kilometres) to Seattle-based Montoff Transportation, LLC for $976,000. The part of the railroad that was sold had been embargoed since 2004. The city still owns the railroad, now known as the Missouri North Central Railroad, to the Chillicothe industrial park and to a location seven miles to the east where future development is planned. In 2008, the Chillicothe Constitution-Tribune reported that the city of Chillicothe bought back the sold portion of the railroad right-of-way from Montoff for $10 and is planning on turning it into a rails-to-trails project. The Mayor of Chillicothe publicly announced in one of his newspaper columns in an area shopper that the city had made a sizeable profit on the sale of the railroad in 2008. The city was subsequently a defendant in a lawsuit brought by a Livingston County farmer at the behest of A & K Railroad Materials of Salt Lake City, Utah. The substance of the lawsuit was that the railroad was worth far more than the city sold it for to Montoff Transportation. A & K Railroad subsequently offered approximately $400,000 more than Montoff had paid for the property, and asked the Court to set aside the sale to Montoff. The lawsuit was later dismissed on a technicality.

Today, the part of the railroad that stretched from Brunswick northward through Triplett, Sumner, and a location just east of Chillicothe has been abandoned, in hopes of turning it into a walking trail, while the rest of the railroad is in operation.
