= Missouri–Kansas–Texas Railroad =

American Class I railroad (1870–1988)

- Katy system as of 1918; many of the outlying lines left the system in the 1923 reorganization

Overview
- Headquarters: Dallas, Texas
- Reporting mark: MKT
- Locale: Kansas, Missouri, Oklahoma, and Texas
- Dates of operation: 1870–1988
- Successor: Missouri Pacific Railroad; Union Pacific Railroad

Technical
- Track gauge: 4 ft 8 1/2 in (1,435 mm) standard gauge

The Missouri–Kansas–Texas Railroad (reporting mark MKT) (1870–1988) was a Class I railroad company in the United States, with its last headquarters in Dallas, Texas. Its predecessor was established in 1865 under the name Union Pacific Railroad (UP), Southern Branch, and came to serve an extensive rail network in Texas, Oklahoma, Kansas, and Missouri. In 1988, it merged with the Missouri Pacific Railroad and together they were part of the UP.

In the 1890s, the MKT was commonly referred to as "the K-T", because for a time it was the Kansas–Texas division of the Missouri Pacific Railroad and "KT" was its abbreviation in timetables as well as its stock exchange symbol. This soon evolved into the nickname "the Katy".

The Katy was the first railroad to enter Texas from the north. Eventually, the Katy's core system linked Parsons, Emporia, Fort Scott, Junction City, Olathe, and Kansas City, Kansas; Kansas City, Joplin, Columbia, McKittrick, Jefferson City, and St. Louis, Missouri; Tulsa, Wagoner; and Oklahoma City, Oklahoma; Dallas, Fort Worth, Waco, Temple, Austin, San Antonio, Houston, and Galveston, Texas. An additional mainline between Fort Worth and Salina, Kansas, was added in the 1980s after the collapse of the Chicago, Rock Island and Pacific Railroad; this line was operated as the Oklahoma, Kansas and Texas Railroad (OKKT). Former Rock Island trackage rights acquired by the Katy also gave it access to Lincoln and Omaha, Nebraska and Council Bluffs, Iowa.

At the end of 1970, MKT operated 2,623 miles (4,221 km) of road and 3,765 miles (6,059 km) of track.

== History ==
=== Formation and construction ===
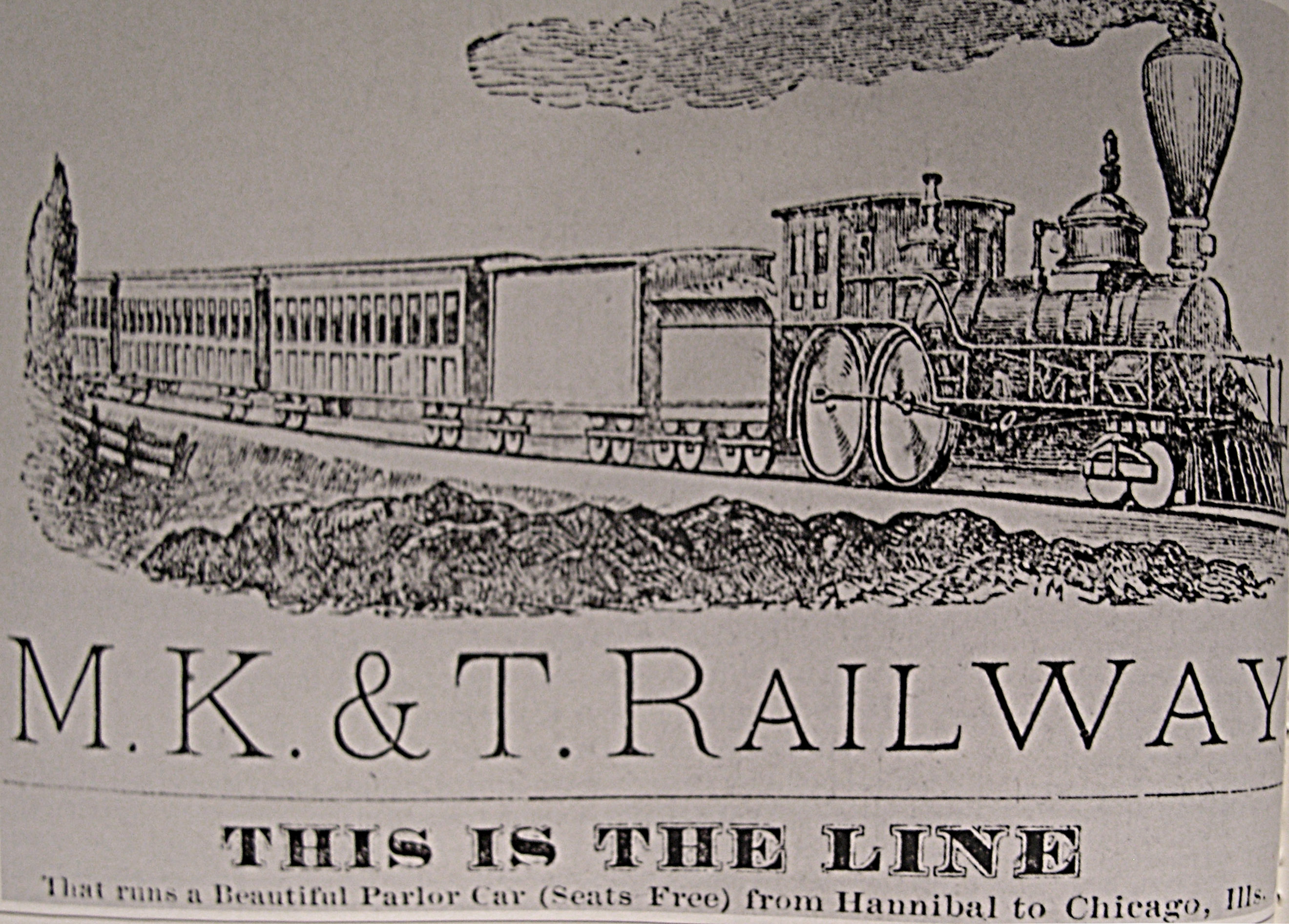
An 1881 advertisement for the line

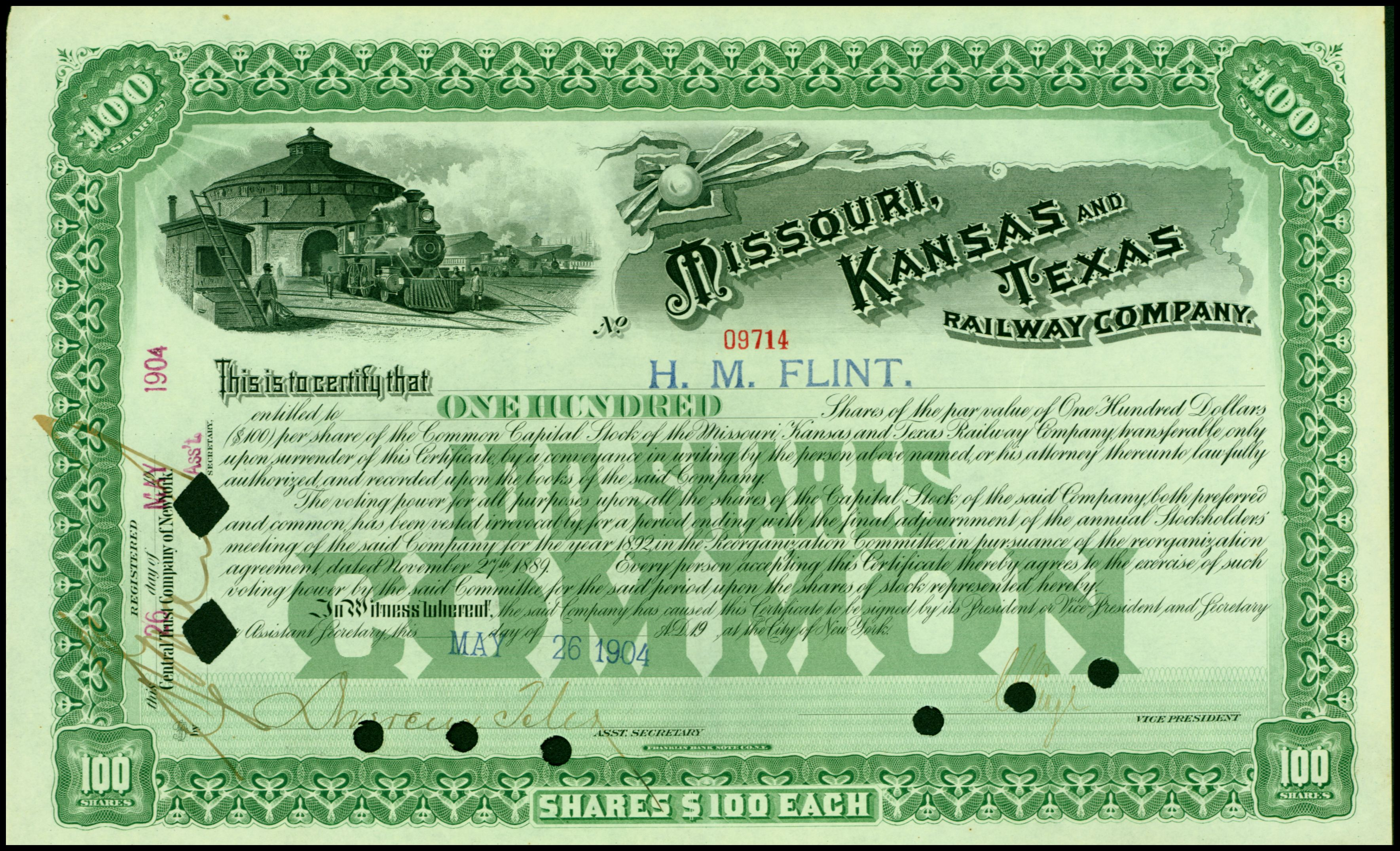
Share of the Missouri, Kansas & Texas Railway, issued 1904

The Missouri, Kansas & Texas Railway was incorporated in May 1870 in Junction City, Kansas. The company received government land grants to build a supply railroad connecting the frontier military posts of Fort Riley, Fort Gibson, and Fort Scott; and eventually Fort Worth, as well as establishing connections with other railroads that served Fort Leavenworth, Fort Wallace and Fort Smith — but its broader ambitions were to connect Chicago and New Orleans. Upon its incorporation, the MK&T acquired the Union Pacific Railway, Southern Branch (est. 1865) and its 182 miles (293 km) of track in Kansas.

At the time of its incorporation, consolidations were also made with the Labette & Sedalia Railway Co. and the Neosho Valley & Holden Railway Co.; MK&T also acquired the Tebo and Neosho Railroad, the St. Louis & Santa Fe Railroad Co., and the Hannibal & Central Missouri Railroad Co. Combined with the UP Southern Branch, these small, newly built railroads formed the foundation on which the Katy built. In the late 1890s, a subsidiary once called the Missouri-Kansas-Eastern railroad was established to run from existing MKT rails approaching Kansas City into St Louis via the Missouri River basin.

Congress had passed acts promising land grants to the first railroad to reach the Kansas border via the Neosho Valley. The Katy portion of the former UP Southern Branch, which had begun building from Fort Riley just north of Junction City, Kansas, was in a heated competition for the prize. On June 6, 1870, Katy workers laid the first rails across the Kansas border, winning the race. Congress' promised land grants were never made, as the courts overturned the grants because the land was in Indian Territory and was the property of the Indian tribes.

The Katy continued its push southward, laying track through the territory and reaching Texas in 1872, acquiring other small railroads while extending its reach to Dallas in 1886, Waco in 1888, Houston in April 1893, and to San Antonio in 1901.

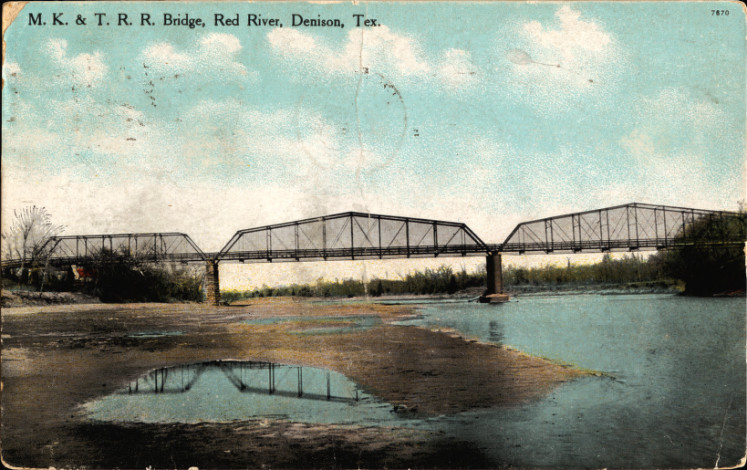
Missouri-Kansas-Texas Railroad bridge over Red River (postcard, c. 1911)

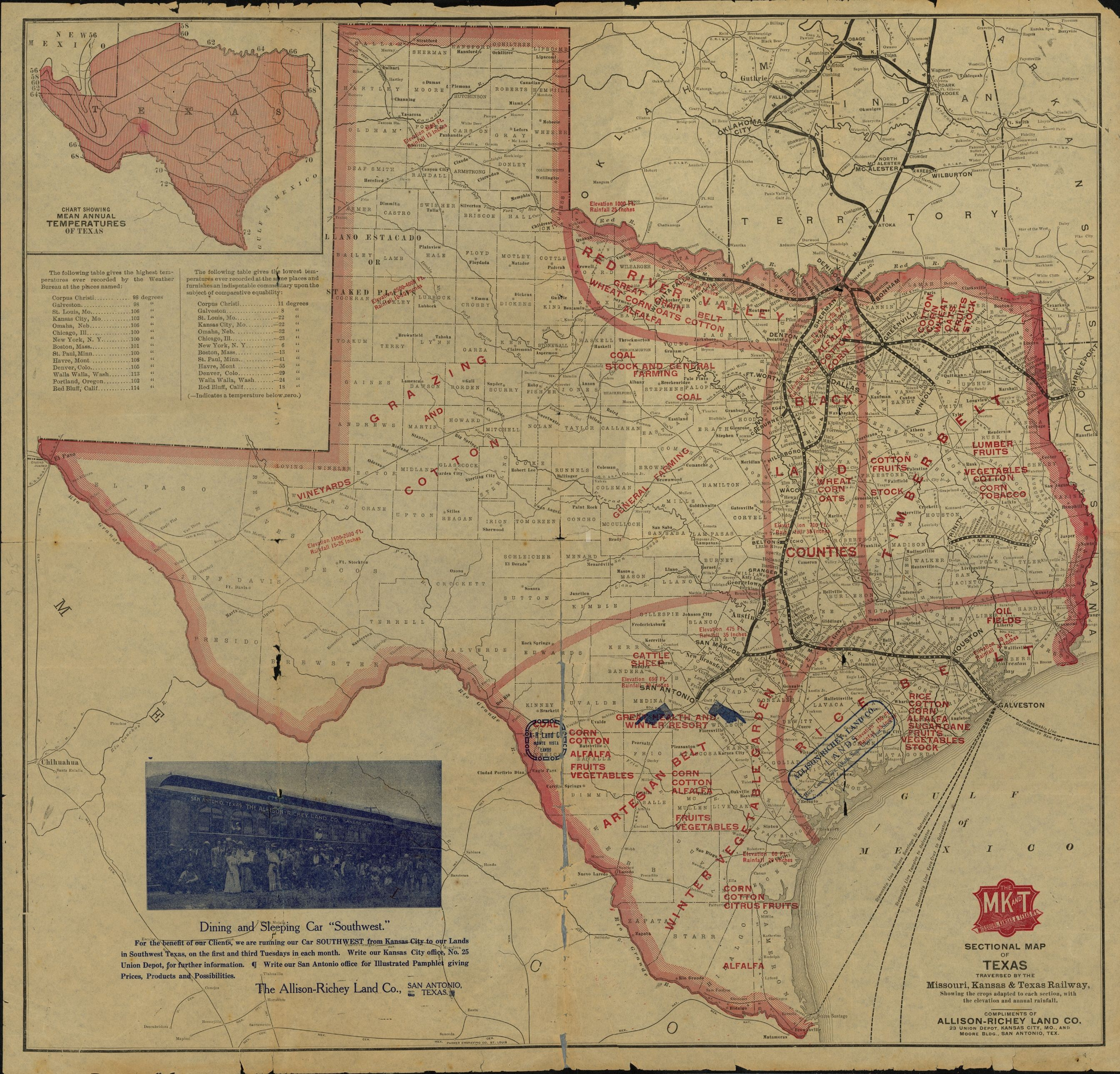
Sectional Map of Texas Traversed by the Missouri, Kansas & Texas Railway, 1904

When the Katy railroad reached Houston, its joint ownership of the Galveston, Houston and Henderson Railroad gave it immediate access to the Port of Galveston and its ocean-going shipping on the Gulf of Mexico.

=== Operations ===
A Katy train was robbed by the Dalton Gang on July 14, 1892, at Adair, Oklahoma, in what was then Indian Territory. The gang got away after a gun battle.

In 1896, as a publicity stunt set up by William Crush, the Katy crashed two locomotives head-on, pulling loaded trains, at a site that came to be known thereafter as Crush, Texas. The collision occurred before more than 40,000 spectators, three of whom died (and several were injured) by debris from the exploding boilers. Ragtime composer and pianist Scott Joplin, who was performing in the area at the time, commemorated the event in his piano piece, "The Great Crush Collision March" (which he dedicated to the Missouri-Kansas-Texas Railway).

Revenue freight traffic, in millions of net ton-miles
Year	Traffic
1925	3317
1933	1827
1944	7256
1960	3980
1970	4999

The Katy acquired the Beaver, Meade and Englewood Railroad in 1931. This trackage, like the length between Altus and Forgan, was abandoned in January 1973.

From 1915 until January 4, 1959, the Katy, in a joint venture with the St. Louis – San Francisco Railway (popularly known as the Frisco), operated the Texas Special from St. Louis to Dallas, Ft. Worth, and San Antonio. It sported rail cars with names including Sam Houston, Stephen F. Austin, David Crockett, and James Bowie after prominent men of the state.

The city of Parsons was at the crossroads of the mainlines to St. Louis, Kansas City, and south to Oklahoma, so it was chosen as the first heavy repair shop site. In 1905 the shops were expanded with a new machine shop 860 by 153 feet in size, blacksmith shop, and storehouse. The primary freight car repair shops were located in Sedalia, Missouri. After extending the mainline into Texas, shops were established at the new center of the system in Denison, Texas, however, these were downgraded when a new shop site was built at Waco, Texas. The Waco Shops were established in 1910 in a section called Bellmead and renamed as the Warden Shops during World War II. Upon transitioning to diesel power, the Warden Shops were closed and diesel maintenance work was concentrated mainly at Parsons.

=== Merger and legacy ===
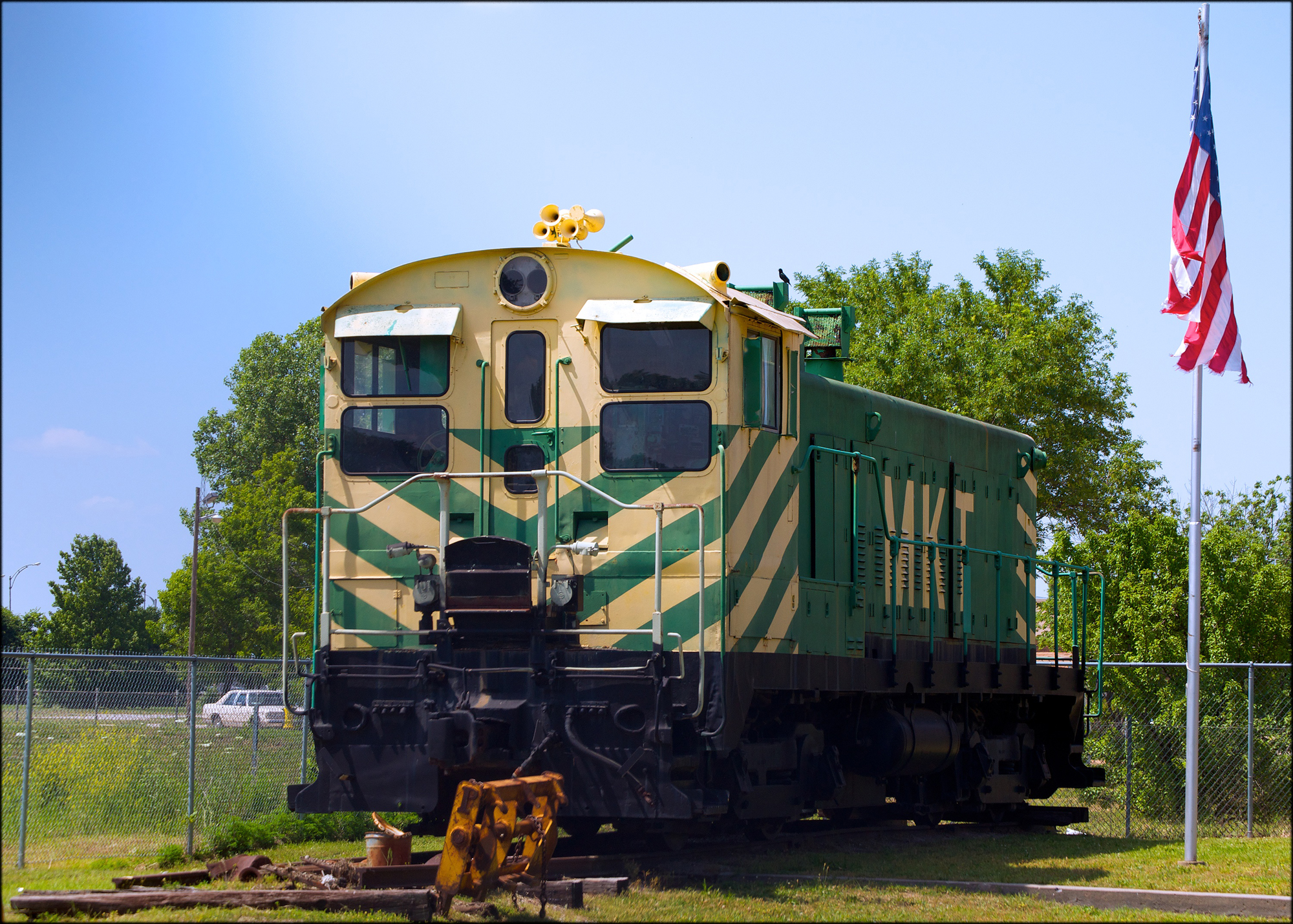
MKT #1006, a Baldwin DS-4-4-1000, on display in Parsons, Kansas

On August 12, 1988, the Missouri Pacific Railroad (MoPac) and its owner, Union Pacific Corporation, purchased the Katy with approval from the Interstate Commerce Commission. The merging and restructuring of railroads during the 1980s had cost the Katy much overhead traffic, and it had been seeking a merger partner. On December 1, 1989, the Katy was merged into the MoPac, which is now part of the Union Pacific Railroad system.

In the "rails to trails" program, much of the Missouri track line has been adapted for use as the Katy Trail State Park, including a spur to Columbia, a Missouri State Park, which runs along the Missouri River for the major portion of its route. In downtown Dallas, a 3.5-mi-long section called the Katy Trail is being converted into a multiuse trail linking Southern Methodist University to the American Airlines Center.

In 1997, the segment linking Katy, Texas, to downtown Houston was abandoned, and stripped of rails soon after. The section between Katy and Interstate 610 was purchased by the Texas Department of Transportation in 1998 for the expansion of Katy Freeway. The line that went into Houston was purchased by the city's Parks and Recreation Department. In 2009, it was adapted and paved as the Heights Bike Trail.

In Tulsa, Oklahoma, the 8.1 miles (13.0 km) Katy trail follows an old corridor of the railroad between the northwest edge of downtown Tulsa and its suburb of Sand Springs.

As part of a new heritage program, in July 2005, Union Pacific unveiled a new EMD SD70ACe locomotive, Union Pacific 1988, painted in traditional MKT colors.

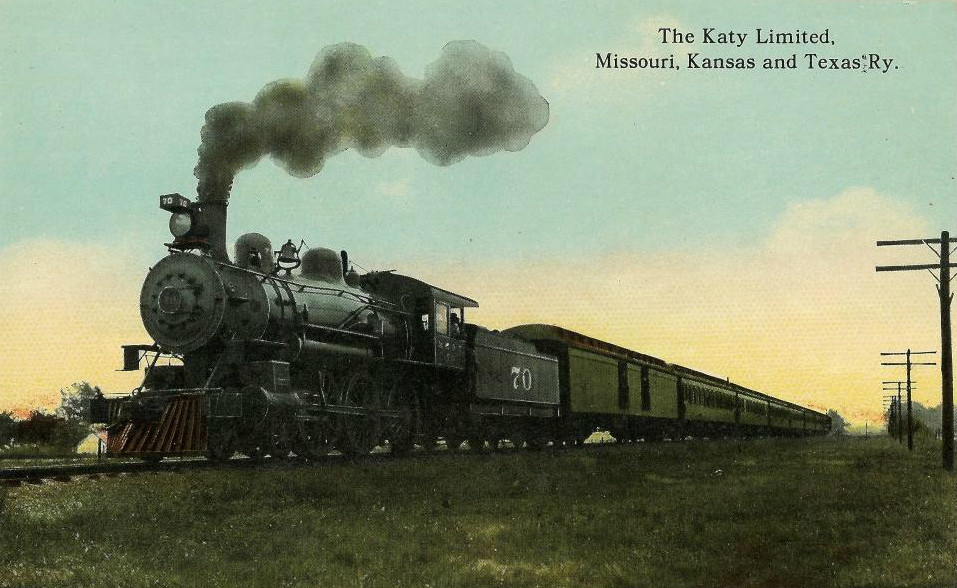
The Katy Limited circa 1910

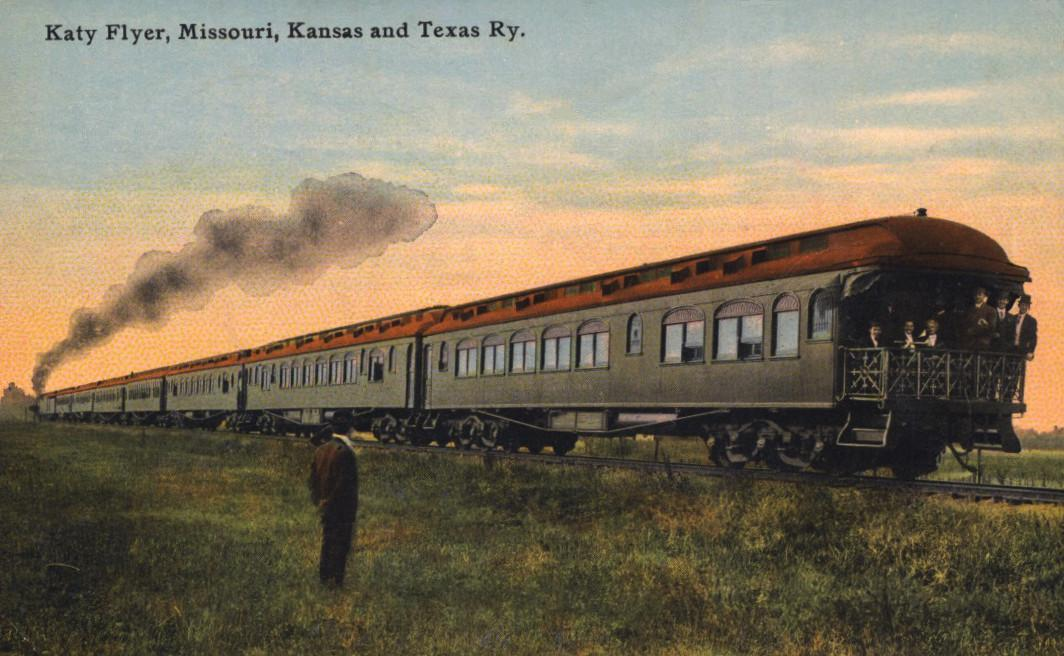
The Katy Flyer in 1911

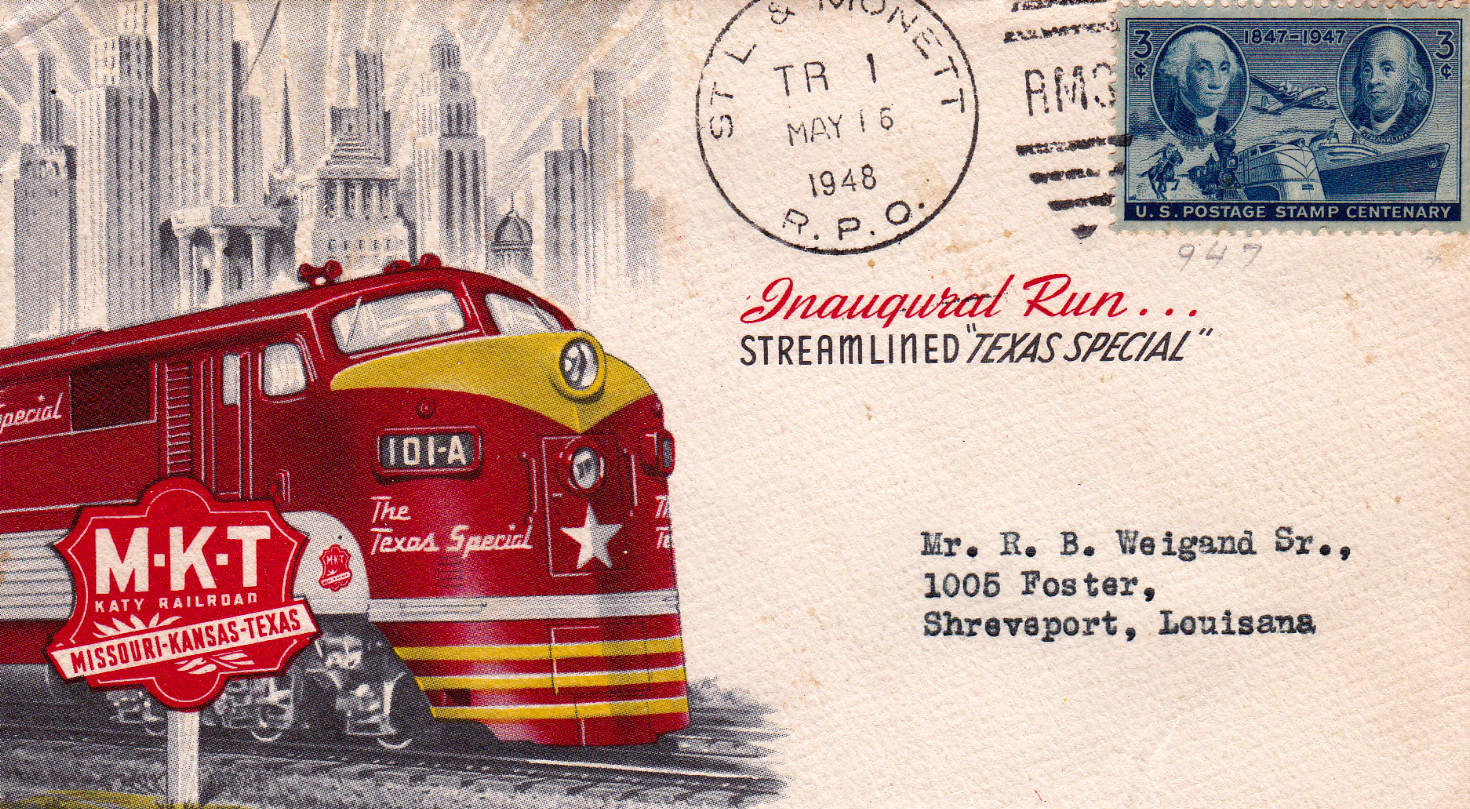
Postcard from the 1948 inaugural run of the streamlined Texas Special.

=== Passenger trains ===
The Katy operated these named passenger trains: (On its main line routes, trains originated in St. Louis or in Kansas City, linking in Parsons, KS, split in Denison, TX, with sections going via either through Dallas or Fort Worth, linking again in Waco, then heading south to either San Antonio or Houston.)

- Train numbers 1 and 2: The Texas Special:
  - St. Louis, Missouri - San Antonio, Texas (March 4, 1917 – 1959) jointly with the St. Louis-San Francisco Railway), then
  - Kansas City-San Antonio (1959-July 26, 1964), then
  - Kansas City-Dallas (July 27, 1964 to June 30, 1965)
- Train numbers 3 and 4: Katy Limited
  - Kansas City-Dallas, with sections to Oklahoma City, Fort Worth and San Antonio
- Train numbers 5 and 6: Katy Flyer
  - St. Louis and Kansas City originating trains, south to San Antonio
- Train numbers 7 and 8: Bluebonnet
  - Kansas City to San Antonio via Dallas, and Kansas City to Houston via Fort Worth
- Train numbers 23 and 28: Sooner
  - Kansas City - Oklahoma City

Herald

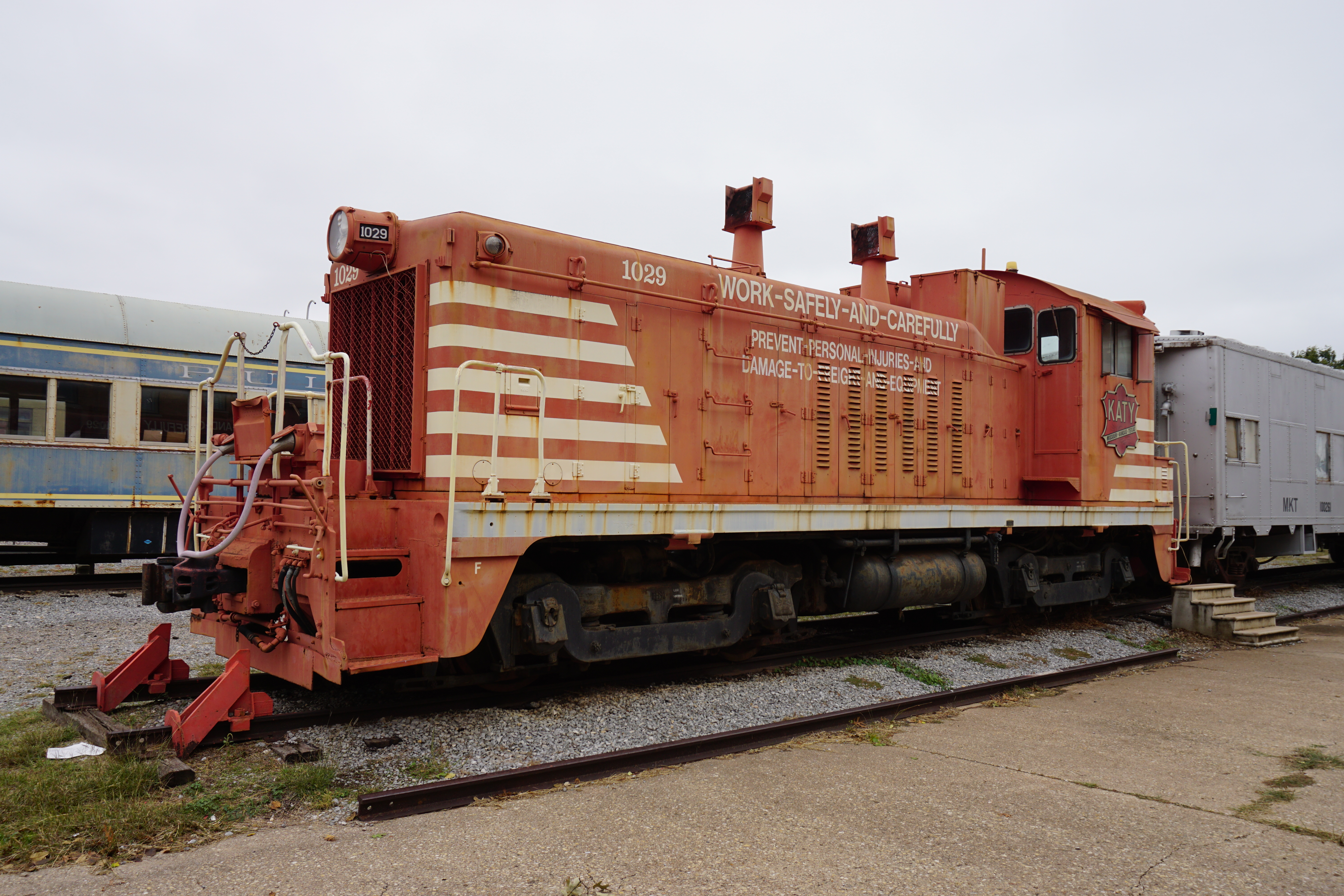
MKT EMD NW2 No. 1029 at the Wichita Falls Railroad Museum

== Company officers ==
Presidents of the Missouri–Kansas–Texas Railroad:

- Judge Levi Parsons, before 1878
- C.Clark, 1879
- Jay Gould, 1880
- George J. Gould, 1886–1887
- Henry C. Rouse, –1904
- Frederick N. Finney, 1904–1906
- Adrian H. Joline 1906–
- Charles E. Schaff, 1912–1926
- Charles N. Whitehead, 1926
- Columbus Haile, 1927–1930
- Michael H. Cahill, 1930–1934
- Matthew S. Sloan, 1934–1945
- Donald V. Fraser, 1945–1956
- William N. Deramus III, 1957–1961
- Charles T. Williams, 1961–1965
- John W. Barriger III, 1965–1970
- Reginald N. Whitman, 1970–1975
- Harold L. Gastler, 1975-1988

== See also ==
- Katy, Texas
- Mokane, Missouri
- Dalton Gang Train Robbery
- "She Caught the Katy"
- Katy Trail State Park
