= List of streetcar systems in the United States =

This is a list of past and present streetcar (tram), interurban, and light rail systems in the United States. System here refers to all streetcar infrastructure and rolling stock in a given metropolitan area; it is not a list of the private companies that operated streetcars.

Like other country-wide lists indexed at List of town tramway systems, this list includes past and present systems. For lists of active systems, see:

- Light rail in the United States
- List of United States light rail systems by ridership
- List of rail transit systems in the United States, which also includes subway/metro and commuter rail systems.

In the state-by-state tables below:

- Names and cities of currently operating systems appear in **bold** on blue backgrounds.
- A diamond (♦) symbol denotes a system that operates or operated in the same area as another independent system.
- The Type column denotes interurban and light rail systems, and is left blank for the far-more-plentiful streetcar systems. (Some pre-1970s systems might have been called light rail if the term had existed at the time.)

== Alabama ==
Name	Location	Motive power	Type (Note: Type of system: streetcar, interurban, or light rail. Blank indicates "streetcar".)	Opened	Closed	Notes
Alabama Power Company	Anniston	Horse		?	?	
Alabama Power Company	Anniston	Electric		May 30, 1888	April 20, 1932	Formerly Anniston Electric and Gas Company
Birmingham Railway, Light and Power Company	Birmingham	Horse		January 24, 1884	April 16, 1898	
Birmingham Railway, Light and Power Company	Birmingham	Steam		May 25, 1885	February 26, 1904	
Birmingham Railway, Light and Power Company	Birmingham	Electric		October 11, 1891	April 19, 1953	
	♦ Bessemer	Steam		May 14, 1890	February 26, 1904	
	♦ Bessemer	Electric		July 25, 1906	1915	City streetcar service absorbed by interurban services.
	♦ Birmingham - Bessemer (two lines)	Steam		May 14, 1890	February 26, 1904	
	♦ Birmingham - Bessemer (two lines)	Electric		June 3, 1902	July 14, 1952	
South Calera Street Railway	Calera	Steam		?	?	
North Alabama Traction Company	Decatur	Horse		?	?	
North Alabama Traction Company	Decatur	Electric		November 1903	?	
	Eufaula	Steam		?	?	
Peoples Railroad	Fairhope	Petrol (gasoline)		?	?	
Alabama Power Company	Gadsden	Mule		October 21, 1888	c. 1890s	
Alabama Power Company	Gadsden	Steam		October 1888	?	
Alabama Power Company	Gadsden	Electric		June 1889	January 1934	
Gadsden, Bellevue and Lookout Mountain Railway	Gadsden	Electric		September 1913	?	
Alabama Power Company	Huntsville	Steam		?	?	
Alabama Power Company	Huntsville	Electric		?	February 15, 1931	Formerly Huntsville Railway, Light and Power Company
	Lannett	Steam		?	?	Connected Lanett with Bleecker, and West Point, Georgia.
Mobile Light and Railroad Company	Mobile	Horse		December 25, 1860	1893	
Mobile Light and Railroad Company	Mobile	Steam		1890	?	
Mobile Light and Railroad Company	Mobile	Electric		January 18, 1893	1941	
Capital City Street Railway	Montgomery	Horse		April 1885		
Capital City Street Railway	Montgomery	Electric		April 15, 1886	April 8, 1936	
Opelika & Auburn Electric Railway	Opelika	Steam		?	?	Connected Opelika and Auburn.
Selma Electric Railway	Selma	Horse		?	?	
Selma Electric Railway	Selma	Steam		?	?	
Selma Electric Railway	Selma	Electric		?	1924	
Sheffield Company	Sheffield	Steam		?	?	
Sheffield Company	Sheffield	Electric		May 1904	February 1933	
Tuscaloosa Railway and Utilities Company	Tuscaloosa	Horse		?	?	
Tuscaloosa Railway and Utilities Company	Tuscaloosa	Steam		?	?	
Tuscaloosa Railway and Utilities Company	Tuscaloosa	Electric		1914	November 1941	
Union Springs Street Car Company	Union Springs	Horse		?	?	

- Peschkes states that a company was organized to build a steam tramway in Blountsville but never started construction, and that other sources tabulate this system among those in operation.

== Arizona ==
Name	Location	Motive power	Type	Opened	Closed	Notes
Douglas Traction and Light Company	Douglas	Steam		1903	?	
Douglas Traction and Light Company	Douglas	Electric		1905	1920	
Phoenix Street Railway	Phoenix (first era)	Horse		November 5, 1887	June 8, 1895	
Phoenix Street Railway	Phoenix (first era)	Electric		September 28, 1893	February 16, 1948	See Phoenix Street Railway. Interurban line to Glendale opened 1911. Planned extensions to Scottsdale, Tempe, and Mesa were never built.
Tempe Street Railway	Tempe (in Phoenix metropolitan area)	Horse		February 22, 1893	February 1898	
Valley Metro Rail	**Phoenix** (second era)	Electric	Light rail	December 27, 2008		Also serves the Phoenix suburbs of Tempe and Mesa
Valley Metro Rail	Tempe	Electric		May 20, 2022		Planned extension to Mesa
Prescott and Mount Union Railway	Prescott	Electric		May 28, 1904	August 1911	Temporary service to Chautauqua fair in June 1912. Cars sold to Douglas in March 1915.
Tucson Rapid Transit Company	Tucson (first era)	Horse		1898	1906	
Tucson Rapid Transit Company	Tucson (first era)	Electric		June 1, 1906	December 31, 1930	
Old Pueblo Trolley	Tucson (first era)	Electric		April 17, 1993	October 2011	Volunteer-operated **heritage streetcar** using one mile of original track.
Sun Link	**Tucson** (second era)	Electric		July 25, 2014		**Reintroduction**
Warren–Bisbee Railway	Warren – Bisbee	Electric	Interurban	March 12, 1908	May 31, 1928	Connected Warren and Bisbee.

== Arkansas ==
Name	Location	Motive power	Type	Opened	Closed	Notes
	Bentonville	Petrol (gasoline)		June 14, 1914	June 11, 1916	
Eureka Traction Company	Eureka Springs	Horse		July 14, 1891	January 1896	
Eureka Traction Company	Eureka Springs	Electric		1896	by 1922	
Fort Smith – Oklahoma Light and Traction Company	Fort Smith	Horse		August 2, 1883	1889	
Fort Smith – Oklahoma Light and Traction Company	Fort Smith	Electric		1896	November 15, 1933	System included interstate line to Arkoma, Oklahoma. See also Fort Smith Trolley Museum, which operates non-transit heritage streetcar service along city streets.
	♦ Van Buren	Electric		?	?	
West Helena Consolidated Company	Helena	Horse		December 1894	January 1910	
West Helena Consolidated Company	Helena	Electric		January 1910	August 5, 1933	
Central Arkansas Railway and Light Corporation	Hot Springs	Horse		?	?	
Central Arkansas Railway and Light Corporation	Hot Springs	Electric		?	1938	see also Hot Springs Street Railroad
Central Power and Light Company	Hoxie – Walnut Ridge	Horse		1889	1905	
Central Power and Light Company	Hoxie – Walnut Ridge	Electric		July 1, 1904	1928	
Intercity Terminal Railway	Little Rock (first era)	Horse		1876	1895	
Intercity Terminal Railway	Little Rock (first era)	Steam		July 3, 1888	1889	
Intercity Terminal Railway	Little Rock (first era)	Electric		December 23, 1891	September 1, 1947	Also served North Little Rock, which before 1917 was named Argenta.
Metro Streetcar	**Little Rock** (second era)	Electric		November 1, 2004		**Heritage streetcar** system. Originally called the River Rail Streetcar; renamed Metro Streetcar in 2015. Also serves North Little Rock.
Pine Bluff Company	Pine Bluff	Horse		November 4, 1886	1902	
Pine Bluff Company	Pine Bluff	Electric		1902	1934	
Searcy & West Point Railroad	Searcy	Horse		?	?	Connected Searcy with West Point.
Stuttgart Improvement Company	Stuttgart	Horse		?	?	
Sulphur Rock Railway	Sulphur Rock	Horse		1889	April 1926	Believed to be the last town tramway operated by horse traction in the U.S.
Southwestern Gas and Electric Company	Texarkana	Horse		1894	1900	
Southwestern Gas and Electric Company	Texarkana	Electric		1900	December 31, 1934	Interstate streetcar system, also served Texarkana, Texas.
Central Power and Light Company	Walnut Ridge	Electric		?	?	

== California ==
Name	Location	Motive power	Type	Opened	Closed	Notes
Alameda, Oakland and Piedmont Railroad	♦ Alameda	Horse		July 1, 1875	1892	
Key System	♦ Alameda	Electric		May 7, 1893	May 3, 1933	See also East Bay Electric Lines
	♦ Anaheim	Horse		March 1, 1887	1899	
Bakersfield and Sumner Railroad	Bakersfield	Horse	Streetcar	May 1888	1900	
Bakersfield and Kern Electric Railway	Bakersfield	Electric	Streetcar	February 17, 1901	February 28, 1942	
	♦ Berkeley	Horse		1873	June 15, 1901	
	♦ Berkeley	Steam		1875	1891	
	♦ Berkeley	Electric		May 12, 1891	November 28, 1948	
Burlingame Electric Railway	♦ Burlingame	Accumulator (storage battery)		February 22, 1913	November 19, 1917	
	Chico	Horse	Streetcar	?[data missing]	1905	
Sacramento Northern Railroad	Chico	Electric	Streetcar	January 2, 1905	December 15, 1947	
Sacramento Northern Railroad	Oroville–Chico–Marysville–Sacramento–Concord–Oakland	Electric	Interurban	1906	July 1, 1941	Earlier Northern Electric Railway north of Sacramento and Oakland, Antioch and Eastern Railway south of Sacramento
Colton & San Bernardino Railway	Colton	Horse	Streetcar	July 2, 1888	1891	
	♦ Coronado	Horse		1887	1886	
	♦ Coronado	Steam		1886	1893	
	♦ Coronado	Electric		October 6, 1893	May 31, 1947	
Eureka Street Railroad	Eureka	Horse	Streetcar	August 20, 1888	April 30, 1897	
Humboldt Transit Company	Eureka	Electric	Streetcar	September 15, 1903	February 20, 1940	
Visalia Electric Railroad	Exeter	Electric	Interurban	1904	1944	
Visalia Electric Railroad	Exeter	Diesel		1944	1992	
Fresno Traction Company	Fresno	Horse	Streetcar	January 25, 1889	September 1901	
Fresno Traction Company	Fresno	Electric	Streetcar	October 19, 1902	May 20, 1939	
Glendale and Montrose Railway	♦ Glendale	Electric	Interurban	March 13, 1909	December 30, 1930	
	♦ Hayward	Horse		c. 1870s	September 1, 1909	
	♦ Imperial Beach	Petrol (gasoline)		1910	1913	
	♦ Imperial Beach	Accumulator (storage battery)		April 1913	1916	
	Lake Elsinore	Electric (?)		?	?	Note for Lake Elsinore: Only one source states that an electric tramway was in operation here.
Pacific Electric	♦ Long Beach	Electric	Streetcar	September 1902	February 24, 1940	See Streetcars in Long Beach. **Reintroduced** (LRT) 14 Jul 1990 as part of Metro Rail's Blue Line.
	Los Angeles	Horse		July 1, 1874	1897	
	Los Angeles	Cable		October 8, 1885	October 2, 1902	See Cable cars and funiculars in Los Angeles
	Los Angeles	Steam		1886	c. 1915	
Los Angeles Railway	Los Angeles	Electric	Streetcar	March 23, 1895	March 31, 1963	Name was changed to Los Angeles Transit Lines in 1945
Pacific Electric	Los Angeles	Electric	Interurban and streetcar	July 4, 1902	April 9, 1961	
Los Angeles MTA	Los Angeles	Electric		March 3, 1958	March 31, 1963	
Angels Flight	Los Angeles	Funicular		1901 1996	1969	**Reopened** in 1996 a few blocks away from the original site.
Metro Rail (A, E, L and C lines)	**Los Angeles**	Electric	Light rail	July 14, 1990		Part of Los Angeles' larger Metro Rail network, which also includes the **rapid transit** B and D lines.
Marysville and Yuba City Street Railway	Marysville – Yuba City	Horse	Streetcar	August 17, 1889	1906	
Sacramento Northern Railroad	Marysville – Yuba City	Electric		1907	February 15, 1942	
Monrovia Street Railway	♦ Monrovia	Horse		1888	1903	
Monterey and Pacific Grove Railway	Monterey – Pacific Grove	Horse	Streetcar	August 5, 1891	May 1903	
Monterey and Pacific Grove Railway	Monterey – Pacific Grove	Electric	Streetcar	June 12, 1903	December 4, 1923	
	♦ National City	Horse		?[data missing]	?[data missing]	
Nevada County Traction Company	Nevada City – Grass Valley	Electric	Interurban	October 15, 1901	1923	
	Oakland	Horse		October 30, 1869	1883	See List of California street railroads
	Oakland	Steam		1875	?[data missing]	See List of California street railroads
	Oakland	Cable	Streetcar	November 19, 1886	May 31, 1899	see Oakland Cable Railway, Piedmont Cable Company
	Oakland	Electric	Streetcar	May 12, 1891	November 28, 1948	see also Key System, San Francisco.
Oakland, San Leandro and Haywards Electric Railway	♦ Oakland – Hayward	Electric	Streetcar	May 1892	March 10, 1935	Later part of the Key System
Ontario and San Antonio Heights Railroad Company	♦ Ontario – Upland	Horse	Streetcar	1887	1895	
Pacific Electric	♦ Ontario – Upland	Electric	Interurban	1895	October 6, 1928	
	Oxnard	Petrol (gasoline)		1908	January 1927	
Peninsular Railway	♦ Palo Alto	Electric	Streetcar	November 14, 1906	September 27, 1925	see also San Jose.
	♦ Pasadena	Horse		1886	1895	
Pacific Electric	♦ Pasadena	Electric		1893	January 19, 1941	**Reintroduced** (LRT) 26 Jul 2003 as part of Metro Rail's Gold Line.
Paso Robles Street Railway Company	Paso Robles	Horse		?[data missing]	1903	
Petaluma Street Railroad	Petaluma	Horse		1889	1903	
Petaluma and Santa Rosa Railroad	Petaluma – Santa Rosa	Electric	Interurban	March 1, 1905	July 1, 1932	Ran from Petaluma to Santa Rosa via Sebastopol and Forestville
	♦ Pomona	Horse		February 10, 1888	1896	
	♦ Pomona	Steam		November 1887	November 1907	
Pacific Electric	♦ Pomona	Electric		July 3, 1909	October 1, 1924	
	♦ Redlands	Mule		May 23, 1889	December 19, 1899	See Streetcars in Redlands
	♦ Redlands	Electric		December 19, 1899	July 20, 1936	See Streetcars in Redlands
East Shore and Suburban Railway	♦ Richmond	Electric	Streetcar	July 28, 1904	November 6, 1933	Subsidiary of the Key System
Shipyard Railway	♦ Richmond	Electric	Interurban	January 18, 1943	September 30, 1945	Operated by the Key System transit company
	♦ Riverside	Horse		1887	1898	
	♦ Riverside	Steam		1887	1898	
Pacific Electric	♦ Riverside	Electric		April 11, 1899	January 10, 1943	
Sacramento City Railway	Sacramento (first era)	Horse	Streetcar	August 20, 1870	c. 1892	
Sacramento Electric, Gas and Railway Company	Sacramento (first era)	Electric	Streetcar	February 1891	1915	See Streetcars in Sacramento. Accumulator (storage battery) experiments around 1888.
Pacific Gas and Electric Company	Sacramento (first era)	Electric	Streetcar	1915	January 4, 1947	**Reintroduced** 12 Mar 1987 (see below).
SacRT light rail	**Sacramento** (second era)	Electric	Light rail	March 12, 1987		
Southern California Motor Road Company	♦ San Bernardino	Steam		1885	1903	
Pacific Electric	♦ San Bernardino	Electric		?[data missing]	April 8, 1942	
	San Diego (first era)	Horse		July 3, 1886	June 30, 1896	
Coronado Beach Railroad Company	San Diego (first era)	Steam		November 29, 1887	1892	
San Diego Cable Railway	San Diego (first era)	Cable		June 7, 1890	October 1, 1892	
San Diego Electric Railway	San Diego (first era)	Electric	Streetcar	December 31, 1887 September 21, 1892	June 1889 April 24, 1949	See San Diego Electric Railway. **Reintroduced** as LRT, 19 July 1981 (see below).
San Diego Trolley	**San Diego** (second era)	Electric	Light rail	July 19, 1981		Operated by MTS, via SDTI. Preceded by the San Diego Electric Railway.
	♦ San Diego – National City	Electric		December 1, 1907	January 10, 1930	
	San Francisco (first era)	Steam		July 4, 1860	1906	Market Street Railway, Geary Street, Park and Ocean Railway, Park and Ocean Railroad, Park and Cliff House Railroad, Presidio & Ferries Railway
	San Francisco (first era)	Horse		July 4, 1860; June 1908	1906; June 3, 1913	
Clay Street Hill Railroad	San Francisco (first era)	Cable		September 1, 1873	September 12, 1891	The world's first cable car line
Sutter Street Railway	San Francisco (first era)	Cable		January 27, 1877	?[data missing]	
California Street Cable Railroad	San Francisco (first era)	Cable		April 10, 1878	July 31, 1951	Purchased by the city of San Francisco in 1952, with one line of the system **reopened**, and still in service.
Geary Street, Park and Ocean Railway	San Francisco (first era)	Cable		February 16, 1880	May 6, 1912	
San Francisco cable car system	**San Francisco**	Cable		1878		
Muni Metro	**San Francisco**	Electric	Light rail (after 1980s upgrades)	April 26, 1892 1917 (1980)		Renovated as partially "light rail" in 1980–1982. See: San Francisco Municipal Railway, Market Street Railway (transit operator). See also: Key System, Oakland.
F Market & Wharves and E Embarcadero	**San Francisco**	Electric		September 1, 1995		**Heritage streetcar**
San Jose Railroads	San Jose (first era)	Horse		November 4, 1868	1901	
San Jose Railroads	San Jose (first era)	Steam		1896	September 1901	
San Jose Railroads	San Jose (first era)	Electric	Streetcar	May 16, 1888	April 10, 1938	**Reintroduced** as LRT, 11 Dec 1987 (see below).
	**San Jose** (second era)	Electric	Light rail	December 11, 1987		LRT (see VTA light rail).
	San Luis Obispo	Horse		October 18, 1887	1901	
Pacific Electric	♦ San Pedro	Electric		1905	January 23, 1938	see Streetcars in San Pedro. **Reopened** as a Heritage streetcar (see below)
Port of Los Angeles Waterfront Red Car Line	♦ San Pedro	Electric		July 12, 2003	September 27, 2015	**Heritage streetcar**
	♦ Santa Ana – Orange	Steam		1897	1914	See Santa Ana–Orange Line
Pacific Electric	♦ Santa Ana – Orange	Electric		February 10, 1906	September 14, 1930	See Santa Ana–Orange Line
Santa Barbara and Suburban Railway	Santa Barbara	Horse		1875	1896	See Streetcars in Santa Barbara, California
Santa Barbara and Suburban Railway	Santa Barbara	Electric		October 1, 1896	June 30, 1929	See Streetcars in Santa Barbara, California
	Santa Cruz	Horse	Streetcar	August 3, 1875	July 1910	See Streetcars in Santa Cruz, California
	Santa Cruz	Electric	Streetcar	November 1, 1891	January 14, 1926	See Streetcars in Santa Cruz, California
	Santa Maria	Horse		?[data missing]	?[data missing]	
	♦ Santa Monica	Horse		1891	1906	
Pacific Electric	♦ Santa Monica	Electric		July 1, 1896	December 13, 1929	
Santa Rosa Street Railway	Santa Rosa	Horse		June 1878	1905	
United Railroads of San Francisco	♦ South San Francisco	Electric	Streetcar	1902	December 31, 1938	
Stockton Street Railway	Stockton	Horse	Streetcar	April 6, 1874	1892	
Stockton Electric Railroad	Stockton	Electric	Streetcar	July 13, 1892	September 1941	
Vallejo Street Railway	Vallejo	Horse		c. 1878	c. 1885	
San Francisco, Napa and Calistoga Railway	Vallejo – Calistoga	Electric	Interurban	1905	1937	Ran from Vallejo to Calistoga via Napa, Yountville, Oakville, Rutherford and St. Helena
Watsonville Railway and Navigation Company	Watsonville	Electric	Interurban	May 1904 April 1911	1907 October 1913	
Woodland Street Railway	Woodland	Horse		May 1888	1897	

== Colorado ==
Name	Location	Motive power	Type	Opened	Closed	Notes
Aspen City Railway	Aspen	Horse		June 1890	1893	
Boulder Street Railway	Boulder	Horse		1891	1892	
Boulder Street Railway	Boulder	Electric		June 24, 1899	1931	
	Colorado Springs	Horse		1887	1890	
Colorado Springs and Interurban Railway	Colorado Springs	Accumulator (storage battery)		1890	?	
Colorado Springs and Interurban Railway	Colorado Springs	Electric		1890	April 30, 1932	
Colorado Springs and Interurban Railway	Colorado Springs ― ♦ Manitou Springs	Electric	Interurban	1890	April 30, 1932	
Colorado Springs & Cripple Creek District Railway	Cripple Creek ― Victor	Electric	Interurban	January 3, 1898	May 16, 1920	
Denver Tramway	♦ Denver (first era)	Horse		December 17, 1871	1899	
Denver Tramway	♦ Denver (first era)	Cable		December 19, 1888	April 1, 1900	
Denver Tramway	♦ Denver (first era)	Electric		July 31, 1886	July 2, 1950	
Denver and Interurban Railroad	♦ Denver ― ♦ Boulder	Electric	Interurban	June 23, 1908	December 15, 1926	
Denver and Northwestern Railway	♦ Denver ― Arvada ― ♦ Golden	Electric	Interurban	April 9, 1904	July 1, 1950	
Denver and South Platte Railway	♦ Denver ― ♦ Englewood ― Littleton	Electric	Interurban	September 24, 1907	May 7, 1926	
Denver and Intermountain Railroad	♦ Denver ― Lakewood ― ♦ Golden	Steam		September 1891	1909	
Denver and Intermountain Railroad	♦ Denver ― Lakewood ― ♦ Golden	Electric		February 22, 1909	June 3, 1950	
RTD Light Rail	**Denver** (second era)	Electric	Light rail	October 7, 1994		Currently operates six light rail lines.
Durango Suburban Street Railway	Durango	Horse		August 1891	1892	
Durango Suburban Street Railway	Durango	Electric		1892	October 1920	
	♦ Englewood	Horse		1892	1910	Two horsecar companies operated in Englewood: the Cherrelyn Gravity & Bronco Railroad and the Loretto Heights Railway.
	Florence	Electric		N/A	N/A	Tramway line built and two cars purchased, but public service was not started.
Fort Collins Municipal Railway	**Fort Collins**	Electric		December 29, 1907 December 29, 1984	June 30, 1951	**Heritage streetcar** service opened December 29, 1984, using the same name as the former system.
Grand Junction Street Railway	Grand Junction	Horse		September 1890	August 1902	
Grand River Valley Railway	Grand Junction	Electric		May 22, 1909	October 29, 1926	
Grand River Valley Railway	Grand Junction ― Fruita	Electric	Interurban	July 14, 1910	October 31, 1928	
Greeley & Denver Railroad	Greeley	Electric		May 30, 1910	December 26, 1922	
Leadville Street Railroad	Leadville	Horse		July 31, 1881	July 1882	
Pueblo Street Railroad	Pueblo	Horse		1879	1890	
Pueblo Electric Street Railway	Pueblo	Electric		June 12, 1890	November 29, 1947	
Manitou Electric Railway & Casino Co.	♦ Manitou Springs	Electric		1895	1928	
Trinidad Street Railway	Trinidad	Horse		1882	1893	
Trinidad Electric Railway	Trinidad	Electric		April 28, 1904	1922	

Peschkes states that, despite various evidence, the following town did not have a tramway:

- Silver Cliff.

== Connecticut ==
Name	Location	Motive power	Type	Opened	Closed	Notes
Derby Horse Railway Company	Ansonia	Horse				
	Bridgeport	Horse		January 23, 1866	?	
	Bridgeport	Electric		?	1937	
	Bristol	Electric		c. 1890s	August 1, 1935	
	Danbury	Horse		c. 1880s	?	
	Danbury	Electric		?	1926	
	Derby	Horse		May 1, 1888	?	
	Derby	Electric		?	1937	
	Greenwich	Electric		c. 1890s	1927	
	Groton	Electric		1904	1928	
Groton and Stonington Street Railway	Groton - Westerly, Rhode Island	Electric	Interurban	1904	1928	
Connecticut Company	Hartford	Horse		May 3, 1863	1892	
Connecticut Company	Hartford	Electric		1888	July 27, 1941	
	Meriden	Horse		c. 1870s	?	
Meridien Electric Railway Company	Meriden	Electric		?	1931	
Middletown Horse Railroad Company	Middletown	Horse		September 14, 1885	?	
	Middletown	Electric		?	1929	
	Milford	Electric		c. 1890s	November 27, 1937	
	Mystic	Horse		c. 1870s	?	
	Mystic	Electric		c. 1900s	?	
New Britain Tramway Company	New Britain	Horse		c. 1880s	?	
	New Britain	Electric		?	1937	
	New Haven	Horse		May 6, 1861	?	
	New Haven	Electric		1892	September 25, 1948	
	New London	Horse		c. 1870s	?	
	New London	Electric		?	1934	
Norwalk Horse Railroad Company	Norwalk	Horse		c. 1860s	?	
	Norwalk	Electric		?	1935	
Norwich Horse Railroad Company	Norwich	Horse		c. 1870s	?	
	Norwich	Electric		c. 1880s	1936	
Norwich and Westerly Railway	Norwich - Westerly, Rhode Island	Electric	Interurban	August 18, 1906	December 31, 1922	Ran from Norwich to Westerly via Preston, Ledyard, North Stonington and Pawcatuck
Stamford Horse Railroad Company	Stamford	Horse		January 31, 1887	?	
	Stamford	Electric		1894	1933	
	Stratford	Horse		c. 1880s	?	
	Stratford	Electric		?	1934	
	Torrington	Electric		c. 1890s	1929	
	Wallingford	Electric		?	1937	
Waterbury Horse Railroad Company	Waterbury	Horse		c. 1880s	?	
	Waterbury	Electric		?	1937	
Westport and Saugatuck Horse Railroad Company	Westport	Horse		1876		
	Willimantic	Horse		c. 1880s	?	
	Willimantic	Electric		1903	1936	

== Delaware ==
Name	Location	Motive power	Type	Opened	Closed	Notes
	Middletown – Odessa	Steam		1906	1909	
	Wilmington	Horse		June 30, 1864	?	
	Wilmington	Electric		1888	1940	

== District of Columbia ==
Name	Location	Motive power	Type	Opened	Closed	Notes
	Washington (first era)	Horse		July 29, 1862	May 26, 1900	
	Washington (first era)	Cable		April 12, 1890	July 23, 1899	
	Washington (first era)	Electric		October 17, 1888	January 28, 1962	See: Streetcars in Washington, D.C., Northern Virginia trolleys. See also Notes below.
DC Streetcar	Washington (second era)	Electric		February 27, 2016	March 31, 2026	**Reintroduction**; see DC Streetcar.

- Notes for Washington, D.C.:
  - Operation into Maryland, September 16, 1892 – January 2, 1960.
  - Operation into Virginia, 1923 – August 25, 1956.

== Florida ==
Name	Location	Motive power	Type	Opened	Closed	Notes
	Altamonte Springs	Horse		?	?	
Arcadia Street Railway and Improvement Company	Arcadia	Horse		c. 1881	?	
	Avon Park	Horse		?	?	Connected Avon Park and Pabor Lake.
Bartow Street Railway	Bartow	Horse		August 5, 1885	?	
Manatee Light & Traction Company:	Bradenton	Electric	Interurban between Manatee and Bradenton	1903	1905	
Coral Gables Rapid Transit	♦ Coral Gables	Electric High Speed Interurban		April 30, 1925	November 3, 1935	
Central of Florida Railway Company	Daytona Beach	Accumulator (storage battery)		?	1918	Daytona, Daytona Beach, and Seabreeze were separate cities at this time. The rail company built the original Broadway Bridge for its trolleys.
	Everglades	Accumulator (storage battery)		?	1929	
Fernandina and Amelia Beach Railway	Fernandina Beach	Electric		1902	1915	
Fernandina Beach Municipal Railway's	Fernandina Beach	Electric		1916 Summer Season Only	1916 Summer Season Only	
Fort Meade Street Car Company	Fort Meade	Horse		January 1, 1887	1913	
Gainesville Street Railway	Gainesville	Horse		?	?	
Green Cove Street Railway	Green Cove Springs	Horse		August 3, 1891	?	Connected Green Cove Springs and Magnolia Springs, bridging Governors Creek, served all railroad stations and steamboat docks.
Jacksonville Street Railway	♦Jacksonville	Horse		1880	May 1895	Various companies consolidated to create Florida's largest streetcar system.
Jacksonville Street Railway	♦Jacksonville	Electric		February 24, 1893	December 12, 1936	Various companies consolidated to create Florida's largest streetcar system.
Jacksonville and LaVilla Street Railway	♦Jacksonville	Horse		January 24, 1885	1895	Various companies consolidated to create Florida's largest streetcar system.
Pine Street Railway	♦Jacksonville	Horse		1882	Name Changed to Main Street Railway when the street name was changed by the city.	Various companies consolidated to create Florida's largest streetcar system.
Main Street Railway	♦Jacksonville	Horse		1882	1902	Various companies consolidated to create Florida's largest streetcar system.
Main Street Railway	♦Jacksonville	Electric		February 24, 1893	December 12, 1936	Various companies consolidated to create Florida's largest streetcar system.
North Jacksonville Street Railway, Town and Improvement Company	♦Jacksonville	Electric		July 1, 1902	March 31, 1911 Merged to for Jacksonville Traction Company.	Various companies consolidated to create Florida's largest streetcar system.
Jacksonville and Suburban Railway	♦Jacksonville	Horse		July 1, 1882	1887	Various companies consolidated to create Florida's largest streetcar system.
Jacksonville Electric Company	♦Jacksonville	Electric		1902 Formed in merger of the Main Street Ry and the Jacksonville Street Railway	March 31, 1911 Merged to for Jacksonville Traction Company.	Various companies consolidated to create Florida's largest streetcar system.
South Jacksonville Municipal Railways	♦Jacksonville	Electric		May 15, 1924	Operated by the Jacksonville Traction Company until its demise December 12, 1936.	Various companies consolidated to create Florida's largest streetcar system.
Ortega Traction Company	♦Jacksonville	Electric		May 1905	c. 1909 Folded into the Jacksonville Traction Company.	Various companies consolidated to create Florida's largest streetcar system.
Duval Traction Company	♦Jacksonville	Electric		1918 for the Camp Johnston Extension	Operated by the Jacksonville Traction Company until its demise December 12, 1936.	Various companies consolidated to create Florida's largest streetcar system.
Jacksonville Traction Company	♦Jacksonville	Electric	Express Trolley to Camp Johnston and San Jose along former Interurban route	March 31, 1911	1932	Sold to Motor Transit Corp a subsidiary of the National City Lines/General Motors consortium, they phased out services until closure on 12 Dec 1936.
Key West Street Car Company	Key West	Horse		1881	1899	
Key West Electric Company	Key West	Electric		1899	June 10, 1926	
Leesburg Transfer Company	Leesburg	Horse		October 31, 1884	?	Two miles (3.2 km) of 3 ft (914 mm) gauge wooden strap rail track that connected depots with steamer arrival points via Main and Canal Streets.
Miami Traction Company	Miami	Accumulator (storage battery)		1915	1921	
Miami Traction Company	Miami	Electric		1st time: July 25, 1906 2nd time: January 7, 1922	1st time: September 3, 1907 2nd time: November 14, 1940	
Miami Beach Railway Co.	♦ Miami Beach	Electric		December 1920	October 17, 1939	
	Mulberry	Horse		?	?	
IMC Agrico Phosphates Co.	Mulberry	Electric	Trolley Freight only	?	?	
Ocala Street and Suburban Railroad	♦ Ocala	Horse		1888	April 1900	
Silver Springs and Western	♦ Ocala	Horse and Steam Dummy	Interurban services between Ocala and Silver Springs	February 6, 1897	?	Connected Ocala and Silver Springs.
Orlando Street Railway	♦ Orlando	Horse		c. February 1887	c. 1893	
Orlando and Winter Park Railway	♦ Orlando – Winter Park	Steam Dummy Line	Interurban service between Orlando, Winter Park and Oviedo	?	?	known as the Dinky Line, later part of East Florida and Atlantic Railroad, later part of Seaboard Air Line Railroad, later part of SCL
Florida East Coast (The Ormond Hotel tram)	Ormond Beach	Horse		1915	?	
Palatka and Heights Street Railway	Palatka	Horse		January 1889	?	
Florida East Coast (The Royal Poinciana-Breakers Hotel tram)	♦ Palm Beach	Horse		c. 1896	c. 1928	
	Panacea	Horse		?	?	Connected Panacea and Sopchoppy.
Pensacola Street Car Company	Pensacola	Horse		March 1, 1883		
Pensacola Electric Terminal Company	Pensacola	Electric	City and Interurban to Warrington and Navy Yard	?	Jun 1932	
St Augustine and South Beach Railway	♦St. Augustine	Horse		?	?	
St Augustine and South Beach Railway	♦St. Augustine	Steam		?	?	
St Augustine and South Beach Railway	♦St. Augustine	Electric	Early Interurban through Salt Marshes	?	?	
St. Augustine Light and Power	♦St. Augustine	Electric	Interurban with freight to Anastasia Island and Beaches	?	1930	
St. Petersburg Municipal Railways	St. Petersburg	Electric		?	1949	
Sanford Traction Company	Sanford	Petrol (gasoline)	Interurban to Beck Hammock and Cameron City	1908	?	Under the same ownership as the Sanford and Everglades Railroad
	Tallahassee	Horse		?	?	
Tampa Street Railway	♦ Tampa (First Streetcar Era)	Horse and Steam		1885	1892	
Tampa Street Railway and Power Company	♦Tampa	Electric		1893	1894	
The Consumers Electric Light and Street Railway Company	♦Tampa	Electric		c. 1890s	1899	
Tampa Electric Company TECO	♦ Tampa	Electric		1899	1946	
TECO Line Streetcar	♦ **Tampa** (second era)	Electric		October 21, 2002		**Heritage streetcar** system operated by the Hillsborough Transit Authority.
Winter Park Company	♦ Winter Park	Mule		February 6, 1885	1903	

== Georgia ==
Name	Location	Motive power	Type	Opened	Closed	Notes
	Albany	Horse		?	?	
Albany Transit Company	Albany	Electric		1912	1920	
	Americus	Electric		1891	1893	
Classic City Street Railway Company	Athens	Horse		?	?	
	Athens	Electric		?	1930	
	Atlanta (first era)	Horse		September 8, 1871	c. 1894	See Streetcars in Atlanta.
	Atlanta (first era)	Steam		1887	?	See Streetcars in Atlanta.
	Atlanta (first era)	Electric		August 22, 1889	April 11, 1949	See Streetcars in Atlanta.
Atlanta Streetcar	**Atlanta** (second era)	Electric		December 30, 2014		Modern streetcar line – Downtown Loop: construction began early 2012, with line opening December 30, 2014.
Augusta and Summerville Railroad Company	Augusta	Horse		?	?	
	Augusta	Electric		?	1937	
Brunswick Street Railroad Company	Brunswick	Horse		1887	?	
	Brunswick	Steam		?	?	
	Brunswick	Electric		1909	1924	
	Cedartown	Horse		?	?	
	Clarkesville	Horse		?	1918	
Columbus Railroad Company	Columbus	Horse		?	?	
	Columbus	Steam		?	?	
	Columbus	Electric		?	1935	System included interstate line to Phenix City, Alabama.
	Covington	Horse		January 1, 1889	1918	
	Cumberland Island	Horse		?	?	
	♦ Fairburn	Petrol (gasoline)		?	1925	
Gainesville and Hall County Street Railroad Company	Gainesville	Horse		?	?	
	Gainesville	Electric		?	April 4, 1925	
	Griffin	Horse		May 1, 1891	?	
Macon City and Suburban Street Railroad Company	Macon	Horse		?	?	
	Macon	Electric		?	1935	
	Milledgeville	Horse		?	?	
Milledgeville and Asylum Dummy Line Railroad	Milledgeville	Steam		?	?	
	Milledgeville	Accumulator (storage battery)		?	June 13, 1914	
Rome Street Railway Company	Rome	Horse		?	?	
Rome Street Railway Company	Rome	Steam		?	?	
	Rome	Electric		?	1931	
	St. Marys	Horse		?	?	
	St. Simons	Horse		?	?	
	St. Simons	Steam		?	?	
	St. Simons	Petrol (gasoline)		?	?	
	Savannah	Horse		1869	?	Two early street railway companies offered both horsecar and steam dummy services: the City and Suburban Railroad and the Coast Line Railroad
	Savannah	Steam		?	1892	Two early street railway companies offered both horsecar and steam dummy services: the City and Suburban Railroad and the Coast Line Railroad
	Savannah	Electric		1890	1946	Heritage streetcar service (the River Street Streetcar) with limited days and hours of operation ran from February 2009 to January 2015.
	Talapoosa	Horse		?	?	
	Talapoosa	Accumulator (storage battery)		?	?	
	Valdosta	Horse		?	?	
	Valdosta	Electric		?	1934	
	Washington	Horse		?	1916	
	Waycross	Horse		?	?	
	Waycross	Electric		?	1917	

Peschkes states that, despite the assumption of another historian, there is no evidence for tramways in the following towns:

- Dahlonega
- Dalton
- LaGrange
- Lexington
- Summerville
- Thomasville

== Hawaii ==
Name	Location	Motive power	Type	Opened	Closed	Notes
	Honolulu	Horse		December 28, 1888	?	
Honolulu Rapid Transit and Land Company	Honolulu	Electric		August 31, 1901	July 1, 1941	Note: a new rapid transit line, the Skyline, opened in 2023.

== Idaho ==
Name	Location	Motive power	Type	Opened	Closed	Notes
Boise Valley Traction Company	Boise	Horse		1887	?	
Boise Valley Traction Company	Boise	Electric	Interurban	1891	1928	
Caldwell Traction Company	Caldwell	Electric	Interurban	1907	1928	
Lewiston–Clarkston Transit Company	Lewiston	Electric	Interurban	May 3, 1915	August 3, 1929	Interstate tramway, extended between Lewiston and Clarkston, Washington.
Sandpoint and Interurban Railway	Sandpoint	Electric	Interurban	April 1910	1917	

== Illinois ==
Name	Location	Motive power	Type	Opened	Closed	Notes
Alton Granite & St. Louis	Alton	Horse		December 13, 1887	?	
Alton Granite & St. Louis	Alton	Electric		?	1935	
	Anna – Jonesboro	Electric		1907	1925	
Aurora, Elgin and Fox River Electric	Aurora	Horse		1884	?	
Aurora, Elgin and Fox River Electric	Aurora	Electric		1891	March 31, 1935	
	♦ Belleville	Horse		?	?	
	♦ Belleville	Electric		?	1935	Reintroduced as part of the St. Louis MetroLink's Red Line in 2001.
Belvidere City Railway Company	Belvidere	Electric	Streetcar	1895	June 30, 1915	
Bloomington & Normal Railway & Light	Bloomington – Normal	Horse		September 1867	1892	
Bloomington & Normal Railway & Light	Bloomington – Normal	Electric		1892	1936	
	♦ Blue Island	Electric		?	?	
Cairo Railway & Light	Cairo	Horse		October 1, 1881	1892	
Cairo Railway & Light	Cairo	Electric		1891	1933	
Illinois Central Electric Railway	Canton	Gas		?	?	"Gas" refers to town gas, not petrol (gasoline).
Illinois Central Electric Railway	Canton	Electric		1907	July 25, 1928	
	Centralia	Horse		?	?	
	Centralia	Electric		1892	1929	
	Champaign – Urbana	Horse		1863	?	
	Champaign – Urbana	Electric		1890	1936	
	Charleston	Electric		1904	1925	
Chicago Transit Authority	Chicago	Horse		1858	1906	
Chicago Transit Authority	Chicago	Cable		January 28, 1882	October 21, 1906	
Chicago Transit Authority	Chicago	Electric		October 21, 1890	June 21, 1958	See Chicago Surface Lines. See also Hammond, Indiana
	♦ Chicago Heights	Electric		?	1925	
	Chillicothe	Horse		?	?	
Chicago and West Towns Railway	♦ Cicero – Berwyn	Horse		?	?	Also experimental operation with steam and gas (town gas) traction.
Chicago and West Towns Railway	♦ Cicero – Berwyn	Electric		?	April 10, 1948	
	Danville	Horse		?	?	
	Danville	Electric		1891	1936	
	Decatur	Horse		1876	?	
	Decatur	Electric		September 1, 1889	1936	
	DeKalb	Electric		?	?	
	♦ Dixon	Electric		May 1904	September 17, 1925	
	Du Quoin	Horse		1890	1898	Connected Du Quoin and St. Johns.
East St. Louis & Suburban	East St. Louis	Electric		?	1935	System operated interstate tramway services to St. Louis, Missouri. Reintroduced (St. Louis LRT) 1993.
Aurora, Elgin and Fox River Electric	Elgin	Horse		1884	?	
Aurora, Elgin and Fox River Electric	Elgin	Electric		?	1936	
Evanston Railway Company	♦ Evanston	Electric		1893	November 11, 1935	
Freeport Railway Light & Power	Freeport	Horse		?	?	
Freeport Railway Light & Power	Freeport	Electric		1891	1933	
Galesburg Railway Company	♦ Galesburg	Horse		June 1885	?	
Galesburg Railway Company	♦ Galesburg	Electric		?	1933	
	♦ Granite City	Electric		?	1958	Interstate suburban line from St. Louis, Missouri.
	Harrisburg	Electric		1913	1933	
	♦ Harvey	Electric		1892	c. 1890s	
	Hillsboro	Electric		1906	?	Interurban served Hillsboro & Litchfield
	Jacksonville	Horse		1867	?	
	Jacksonville	Electric		?	1930	
	Joliet	Horse		?	?	
	Joliet	Electric		?	1934	
Kankakee Electric Railway	Kankakee	Electric		1891	1931	
	Kewanee	Electric		?	February 1936	
	LaSalle – Peru	Steam		?	?	
	LaSalle – Peru	Electric		1891	1926	
	Lincoln	Electric		December 25, 1891	1928	
Mattoon Street Railway	Mattoon	Electric		1904	March 1, 1927	
Mechanicsburg and Buffalo Railway	Mechanicsburg – Buffalo	Horse		?	?	
Mechanicsburg and Buffalo Railway	Mechanicsburg – Buffalo	Electric		?	?	
Moline Central Street Railway	♦ Moline	Horse		1884	1901	
Union Street Railway	♦ Moline	Steam		1886	1892	
	♦ Moline	Electric		1889	1936	Multiple electric streetcars operated in Moline before consolidation into the Tri-City Railway & Light Co. in March 1906.
Rock Island Southern	Monmouth ― ♦ Galesburg	Electric	Interurban	1906	1926	
Rock Island Southern	Monmouth ― ♦ Rock Island	Electric	Interurban	1910	1926	
City Railway Company of Mt. Vernon	Mount Vernon	Electric		1914	1917	
	Murphysboro	Electric		1903	1928	
	Ottawa	Electric		August 31, 1889	1930	
Central Illinois Traction Company	Paris	Electric		?	1926	
Pekin Municipal Railway	Pekin	Horse		?	?	
Pekin Municipal Railway	Pekin	Accumulator (storage battery)		August 23, 1911		
Pekin Municipal Railway	Pekin	Electric		?	November 11, 1935	
Illinois Power Company	Peoria	Horse		1870	?	
Illinois Power Company	Peoria	Electric		September 1, 1889	1946	
	Pontiac	Electric		April 23, 1905	November 24, 1925	
	Princeton	Electric		1906	1929	
	Quincy	Horse		1867	?	
	Quincy	Electric		?	1930	
Rockford Public Service	Rockford	Horse		1881	1889	
Rockford Public Service	Rockford	Electric		1889	July 4, 1936	
	♦ Rock Island	Horse		1866	1890	Multiple companies operated horsecar lines in the city.
Rock Island & Milan Street Railway	♦ Rock Island	Steam		1886	1895	
	♦ Rock Island	Electric		1890	March 1906	Multiple electric streetcars operated in Rock Island before consolidation into the Tri-City Railway & Light Co. in March 1906.
Tri-City Railway & Light Co.	♦ Rock Island ― ♦ Moline ― Silvis ― Milan ― ♦ Davenport (Iow.)	Electric	Interurban	1895	April 15, 1940	
Illinois Power Company	Springfield	Horse		January 26, 1866	?	
Illinois Power Company	Springfield	Electric		1893	December 21, 1937	
	Sterling	Electric		May 1904	September 17, 1925	
	Streator	Electric		1891 1898	1896 1912	
Taylorville Railway Light Heat & Power	Taylorville	Electric		1909	1925	
Keokuk Electric Car & Power Co.	Warsaw ― Hamilton ― Keokuk (Ill.)	Electric	Interurban	October 4, 1903	May 15, 1928	
Bluff City Electric Railway	Waukegan	Electric	Streetcar	1891	1947	See the Chicago North Shore and Milwaukee Railroad in which the Bluff City Electric Railway was a subsidiary.

== Indiana ==
Name	Location	Motive power	Type	Opened	Closed	Notes
Anderson Street Railway Company	Anderson	Horse		?	August 14, 1892	
	Anderson	Electric		?	November 13, 1937	
	Angola	Electric		July 4, 1904	October 15, 1918	
Terre Haute, Indianapolis and Eastern Traction Company	Brazil	Electric		?	?	
	Brownstown	Horse		1892	1916	
	Columbus	Horse		?	?	
Interstate Public Service	Columbus	Electric		1892	July 28, 1929	
Terre Haute, Indianapolis and Eastern Traction Company	Crawfordsville	Electric		?	October 31, 1922	
Hammond, Whiting and East Chicago Railway	♦ East Chicago	Electric		May 15, 1893	1940	Also served Whiting.
Northern Indiana Railway	Elkhart	Horse		?	?	
Northern Indiana Railway	Elkhart	Electric		1891 May 15, 1894	1891 Jun 2, 1934	
	Elwood	Electric		September 6, 1893	August 1, 1924	
Evansville Street Railway	Evansville	Horse		1886	1894	
Evansville and Ohio Valley Railway	Evansville	Electric		September 15, 1892	1939	
Citizens' Street Railroad	Fort Wayne	Horse		January 6, 1872	August 9, 1894	
	Fort Wayne	Electric		August 7, 1892	June 27, 1947	
	French Lick – West Baden Springs	Electric		November 9, 1903	July 18, 1919	
Gary Railways	Gary	Electric		May 20, 1908	February 28, 1947	Also served Hobart
	Goshen	Electric		July 4, 1896	c. 1920	
Green Castle City Street Railway	Greencastle	Horse		January 3, 1866	?	
Hammond, Whiting and East Chicago Railway	Hammond	Electric		May 15, 1893	1946	Operated interstate service to Chicago, Illinois.
	Huntington	Electric		1902	1910	
Citizens' Street Railway Company	Indianapolis	Horse		October 3, 1864	1894	see Streetcars in Indianapolis
Indianapolis Street Railway Company	Indianapolis	Electric		June 18, 1890	January 11, 1953	see Streetcars in Indianapolis
Interstate Public Service	♦ Jeffersonville	Electric		1888	1934	
	Kokomo	Electric		December 15, 1891	April 17, 1932	
	La Porte	Electric		July 1, 1902	1918	
Lafayette Street Railway	Lafayette	Horse		1868 1884	c. 1870s 1889	
Indiana Service Corporation	Lafayette	Electric		October 30, 1888	March 14, 1940	
Logansport Railway	Logansport	Horse		1882	1896	
	Logansport	Electric		October 1, 1891	April 29, 1932	
Madison Street Railway Company	Madison	Horse		c. 1880s	?	
	Madison	Electric		June 20, 1898	June 30, 1918	
	Marion	Horse		c. 1880s	?	
	Marion	Electric		August 1, 1893	June 26, 1947	
Citizens' Street Railway	Michigan City	Horse				
Northern Indiana Railway	Michigan City	Electric		c. 1890s	1932	
	Mount Vernon	Horse		?	?	
	Muncie	Steam	October 2, 1889	1890	?	
	Muncie	Electric		September 1, 1892	1932	
New Albany Railway Company	New Albany	Horse				
Interstate Public Service	New Albany	Electric		1891	February 2, 1946	See also Louisville, Kentucky.
Terre Haute, Indianapolis and Eastern Traction Company	New Castle	Electric		?	October 31, 1922	
	Peru	Electric		August 3, 1901	December 5, 1934	
Richmond City Railroad Company	Richmond	Horse		c. 1880s	?	
Terre Haute, Indianapolis and Eastern Traction Company	Richmond	Electric		September 6, 1889	1938	
Northern Indiana Railway	♦ South Bend	Horse		May 27, 1885		
Northern Indiana Railway	♦ South Bend	Electric		November 15, 1885 c. 1890	? June 15, 1940	Experimental operation in 1882. System also served Mishawaka.
Terre Haute Street Railway Company	Terre Haute	Mule	Streetcar	1867	?	
Terre Haute, Indianapolis and Eastern Traction Company	Terre Haute	Electric	Streetcar	January 1891	October 31, 1939	
Vincennes Street Railway	Vincennes	Horse		1881	?	
	Vincennes	Electric		September 8, 1891	July 1, 1938	
	Wabash	Electric		August 3, 1901	August 30, 1930	
	Warsaw	Electric		?	1938	
	Washington	Horse		?	?	
	Washington	Electric		1894	October 31, 1935	

== Iowa ==
Name	Location	Motive power	Type	Opened	Closed	Notes
Albia Interurban Railway	♦ Albia	Electric		December 18, 1907	1922	
Albia Interurban Railway	♦ Albia ― Hiteman	Electric	Interurban	1908	June 1924	
Albia Interurban Railway	♦ Albia ― Hocking	Electric	Interurban	1907	1925	
Ames & College Railway	Ames	Steam		July 4, 1891	May 1, 1906	
Fort Dodge, Des Moines & Southern Railroad	Ames ― Kelley	Electric	Interurban	June 29, 1907	July 1929	
Boone & Boonesboro Street Railway	♦ Boone	Horse		September 1883	c. 1890s	
Boone Suburban Electric Railway	♦ Boone	Electric		November 14, 1899	May 19, 1925	
	Burlington	Horse		January 1, 1874	c. 1890s	Multiple companies operated horsecar lines in the city.
Union Street Railway	Burlington	Electric		May 30, 1891	1929	
Cedar Falls & Normal Railway	♦ Cedar Falls	Electric		December 14, 1897	May 18, 1941	
Cedar Rapids & Marion Railway	♦ Cedar Rapids	Horse		1880	1892	
Cedar Rapids & Iowa City Railways	♦ Cedar Rapids ― ♦ Iowa City	Electric	Interurban	June 6, 1904	May 30, 1953	
Cedar Rapids & Iowa City Railways	♦ Cedar Rapids ― Lisbon	Electric	Interurban	March 14, 1914	July 27, 1928	
Cedar Rapids & Marion Railway	♦ Cedar Rapids ― Marion	Steam	Interurban	May 3, 1880	1892	
Cedar Rapids & Marion Railway	♦ Cedar Rapids ― Marion	Electric	Interurban	December 13, 1891	November 13, 1937	
Peoples' Street Railway Co.	Centerville	Horse		October 12, 1887	1902	
Iowa Southern Utilities Co.	Centerville	Electric		1902	April 25, 1925	
Iowa Southern Utilities Co.	Centerville ― Mystic	Electric	Interurban	April 22, 1910	Mar 1933	
Iowa Southern Utilities Co.	Centerville ― ♦ Albia	Electric	Interurban	August 1914	March 1933	Operated on the Albia Interurban Railway's tracks in Albia city limits.
Charles City Western Railway	Charles City ― Marble Rock	Petrol (gasoline)	Interurban	January 1, 1911	1915	
Charles City Western Railway	Charles City ― Marble Rock ― Colwell	Electric	Interurban	July 30, 1915	July 19, 1952	
Charles City Western Railway	Charles City	Electric		1915	1921	
Clinton & Lyons Horse Railway	♦ Clinton	Horse		October 1, 1869	1891	
Clinton Street Railway	♦ Clinton	Electric		1890	May 25, 1937	
Colfax Springs Railway	Colfax	Electric		1909	1920	
Broadway Street Railway	Council Bluffs	Horse		1869	?	
	Council Bluffs	Steam		July 1888	1899	
Omaha & Council Bluffs Railway	Council Bluffs ― Omaha (Neb.)	Electric	Interurban	December 1887	September 15, 1948	
	♦ Davenport	Horse		1867	1890	Multiple companies operated horsecar lines in the city.
Davenport Central Railway	♦ Davenport	Steam		1878	1888	
Tri-City Railway & Light Co.	♦ Davenport	Electric		1885	October 1936	
Clinton, Davenport & Muscatine Railway	♦ Davenport ― Clinton	Electric	Interurban	November 20, 1904	March 31, 1940	Chartered as the Iowa & Illinois Railway and acquired by the CD&MR in 1916.
Clinton, Davenport & Muscatine Railway	♦ Davenport ― Muscatine	Electric	Interurban	August 1, 1912	November 8, 1938	Chartered as the Davenport & Muscatine Railway and acquired by the CD&MR in 1916.
Tri-City Railway & Light Co.	♦ Davenport ― Rock Island (Ill.) ― Milan (Ill.) ― Moline (Ill.) ― Silvis (Ill.)	Electric	Interurban	1895	April 15, 1940	
	♦ Des Moines	Horse		January 11, 1868	1889	Multiple companies operated horsecar lines in the city.
Belt Line Railway	♦ Des Moines	Steam		1888	1889	
Des Moines City Railway	♦ Des Moines	Electric		December 19, 1888	March 6, 1951	
Fort Dodge, Des Moines & Southern Railroad	♦ Des Moines ― ♦ Boone	Electric	Interurban	1906	August 31, 1955	
Des Moines & Central Iowa Railway	♦ Des Moines ― Colfax	Electric	Interurban	February 1903	August 2, 1941	
Des Moines & Central Iowa Railway	♦ Des Moines ― Perry	Electric	Interurban	November 1906	September 28, 1949	
Dubuque Street Railway	**Dubuque**	Horse		May 23, 1868	1889	
Hill Street & West Dubuque Steam Railway	**Dubuque**	Steam		July 12, 1877	1884	
Dubuque Electric Co.	**Dubuque**	Electric		December 25, 1889	July 4, 1932	
Fenelon Place Elevator	**Dubuque**	Funicular		1893		
Fort Dodge, Des Moines & Southern Railroad	Fort Dodge	Electric		1896	November 14, 1925	
Fort Dodge, Des Moines & Southern Railroad	Fort Dodge ― ♦ Boone	Electric	Interurban	1907	August 31, 1955	
Fort Dodge, Des Moines & Southern Railroad	Fort Dodge ― Lehigh ― Webster City	Electric	Interurban	1917	1925	
Fort Dodge, Des Moines & Southern Railroad	Fort Dodge ― Rockwell City	Electric	Interurban	1916	August 25, 1926	
Fort Madison Street Railway	Fort Madison	Horse		July 18, 1888	1895	
Fort Madison Street Railway	Fort Madison	Electric		1895	1930	
Independence & Rush Park Street Railway	Independence	Electric		August 22, 1892	August 14, 1907	
Iowa City Electric Railway	♦ Iowa City	Electric		November 1, 1910	August 16, 1930	
Keokuk Electric Car & Power Co.	Keokuk	Horse		1883	1890	
Keokuk Electric Car & Power Co.	Keokuk	Electric		August 30, 1890	May 15, 1928	
Keokuk Electric Car & Power Co.	Keokuk ― Warsaw (Ill.)	Electric	Interurban	October 4, 1903	May 15, 1928	
Marshalltown Street Railway	Marshalltown	Horse		1883	1892	
Marshalltown Light, Power & Railway Co.	Marshalltown	Electric		December 31, 1892	August 31, 1928	
Mason City & Clear Lake Railway	Mason City ― Clear Lake	Electric	Interurban	July 4, 1897	August 30, 1936	
Clinton, Davenport & Muscatine Railway	♦ Muscatine	Horse		September 11, 1883	1893	Operated under multiple names throughout its service life.
Clinton, Davenport & Muscatine Railway	♦ Muscatine	Electric		May 30, 1893	March 17, 1929	Operated under multiple names throughout its service life.
Oskaloosa Traction & Light Co.	Oskaloosa	Horse		June 1, 1890	1898	
Oskaloosa Traction & Light Co.	Oskaloosa	Electric		1898	May 1926	
Oskaloosa Traction & Light Co.	Oskaloosa ― Beacon	Electric	Interurban	November 24, 1906	May 1926	
	Ottumwa	Horse		1881	1892	Three horsecar companies operated in the city until the 1890s.
Ottumwa Railway & Electric Co.	Ottumwa	Electric		November 28, 1889	August 12, 1930	Operated under multiple names throughout its service life.
Red Oak Street Railway	Red Oak	Horse		April 1882	1901	
Sioux City Street Railway	♦ Sioux City	Horse		July 4, 1884	April 5, 1890	
Sioux City & Highland Park Railway	♦ Sioux City	Steam		1888	November 1904	
Sioux City Cable Railway	♦ Sioux City	Cable		June 1, 1889	May 15, 1894	
Sioux City Traction Co.	♦ Sioux City	Electric		April 6, 1890	1948	
Sioux City Traction Co.	♦ Sioux City ― South Sioux City (Neb.)	Electric	Interurban	1890s	April 15, 1937	
Tama & Toledo Railway	Tama ― Toledo	Electric	Interurban	July 4, 1894	June 25, 1925	
Waterloo Street Railway	Waterloo	Horse		October 1, 1885	May 1896	
Waterloo & Cedar Falls Rapid Transit Co.	Waterloo	Electric		1896	August 1939	
Waterloo & Cedar Falls Rapid Transit Co.	♦ Waterloo ― ♦ Cedar Falls	Electric	Interurban	June 9, 1897	July 31, 1958	
Waterloo & Cedar Falls Rapid Transit Co.	♦ Waterloo ― ♦ Cedar Rapids	Electric	Interurban	September 14, 1914	February 20, 1956	
Waterloo & Cedar Falls Rapid Transit Co.	♦ Waterloo ― Waverly	Electric	Interurban	December 29, 1910	August 11, 1955	

== Kansas ==
Name	Location	Motive power	Type	Opened	Closed	Notes
Abilene Street Railway Company	Abilene	Horse		1887	1890	
	Arkansas City	Horse		1887	1909	
Atchison Street Railway Company	Atchison	Horse		1880	1885	
Atchison Railway Light & Power Co.	Atchison	Electric		1895	April 1928	
	Baxter Springs	Horse		?	?	
Chetopa Street Car Company	Chetopa	Horse		1887	1890	
Clay Center City Railway Company	Clay Center	Horse		?	?	
Union Electric Railway	Coffeyville	Electric		1907	1947	
Union Electric Railway	Coffeyville ― Nowata (Okl.)	Electric	Interurban	1915	July 17, 1947	
Union Electric Railway	Coffeyville ― Independence ― Cherryvale ― Parsons	Electric	Interurban	July 14, 1907	July 17, 1947	
Consolidated Street Railway Company	Cottonwood Falls – Strong City	Horse		August 22, 1887	January 29, 1918	
	Cottonwood Falls – Strong City	Petrol (gasoline)		January 29, 1918	June 27, 1919	
Council Grove Street Railway Company	Council Grove	Horse		1887	1894	
	Dighton (?)	Horse (?)		?	?	See note.
Emporia City Railway Company	Emporia	Horse		?	1897	
	Emporia	Electric		1911	1928	
Bourbon County Street Railway	Fort Scott	Horse		?	?	
	Fort Scott	Electric		c. 1890s	1918	
Garden Street Railway Company	Garden City	Horse		1887	1891	
Girard Coal Belt Electric Railway	Girard	Electric		1907	1909	Acquired by the Joplin & Pittsburg Railway in 1909 and consolidated into its interurban network.
	Great Bend	Horse		?	?	
Hartland Street Railway Company	Hartland	Horse				
Hutchison Street Railway Company	Hutchinson	Horse		April 15, 1887	1906	
Hutchison Street Railway Company	Hutchinson	Electric		1906	1925	
Union Electric Railway	Independence	Electric		1907	1947	
	Iola ― LaHarpe	Electric	Interurban	December 23, 1901	1919	
Electric Railway, Light & Ice Co.	Junction City	Electric		August 10, 1901	February 28, 1934	
	♦ Kansas City	Horse		?	?	
	♦ Kansas City	Cable		June 24, 1884	October 13, 1913	
	♦ Kansas City	Electric		September 6, 1889	1957	Streetcar system served Kansas City, North Kansas City and Independence, Missouri, and Kansas City, Kansas.
	Kingman	Horse		1887	1890	
Larned Street Railway Company	Larned	Horse		September 1, 1887	1893	
Lawrence Transportation Company	Lawrence	Horse		1871	1899	
	Lawrence	Electric		1909	1933	
	♦ Leavenworth	Horse		1887	1896	
	♦ Leavenworth	Steam		1887	1894	
	♦ Leavenworth	Electric		1894	1925	
Manhattan City and Interurban Railway Co.	Manhattan	Electric		1909	1934	
Manhattan City and Interurban Railway Co.	Manhattan ― Fort Riley ― Junction City	Electric	Interurban	1914	1922	
	McPherson	Horse		June 1887	1894	
Newton City Street Railway Company	Newton	Horse		1886 1910	1890 ?	
	Newton	Electric		October 25, 1913	November 1, 1925	
Ottawa Street Railway Company	Ottawa	Horse		1887	1892	
	Parsons	Electric		?	?	
	Pittsburg	Electric		October 20, 1890	1932	See also: Joplin, Missouri.
City Railway Company	Pratt	Horse		1886	1892	
Salina Railway Company	Salina	Horse		1887	1894	
	Salina	Petrol (gasoline)		1906	1908	
	Salina	Electric		1909	1933	
	♦ Topeka	Horse		June 7, 1881	1896	Various transit companies and horsecar lines operated before being completely phased out by 1896.
Topeka Rapid Transit Railway Co.	♦ Topeka	Steam		May 1, 1888	December 1888	
Topeka Railway Co.	♦ Topeka	Electric		April 9, 1889	July 17, 1937	
Wellington Street Railway	Wellington	Horse		May 1886	December 1890	
Wichita Street Railway	Wichita	Horse		1887	1890	
Wichita Railroad & Light Co.	Wichita	Electric		1890	1933	
Arkansas Valley Interurban Railway	Wichita ― Newton ― Hutchinson	Electric	Interurban	December 22, 1915	July 31, 1938	
Union Street Railway	Winfield	Horse		August 31, 1886	May 17, 1909	
Southwestern Interurban Railway	Winfield ― Arkansas City	Electric	Interurban	June 1909	May 24, 1926	Known as Arkansas City, Winfield and Northern Railway beginning 16 January 1923

- Peschkes states that, although included in some statistics, the following (horse-drawn) streetcar systems were not built:
  - Beloit.
  - Dighton. Peschkes states that one source, dated 1888, states that this town had a streetcar line, but no confirmation was found.
  - El Dorado.
  - Marion. Peschkes states that "there is no more than a rumor" that this town had a horsecar line.

== Kentucky ==
Name	Location	Motive power	Type	Opened	Closed	Notes
Ohio Valley Electric Railway	Ashland	Electric	Interurban and streetcar	1899	1936	Besides operating local streetcar service in Ashland the Ohio Valley Electric Railway operated an interurban route between Ashland and Huntington, West Virginia.
	Bowling Green	Horse		?	?	
	Bowling Green	Electric		c. 1890s	?	
South Covington and Cincinnati Street Railway Company	Covington	Horse		1867	?	
	Covington	Electric		1890	July 3, 1950	Also served Newport and other communities. Operated service across Ohio River to Cincinnati, Ohio.
	Frankfort	Electric		March 30, 1894	January 6, 1934	
	Georgetown	Horse		?	?	
	Georgetown	Electric		c. 1890s	?	
Henderson Street Railway Company	Henderson	Horse		c. 1880s	?	
	Henderson	Electric		February 2, 1895	July 17, 1923	
Lexington City Railway Company	Lexington	Horse		August 26, 1882	September 4, 1890	
	Lexington	Electric		August 24, 1890	April 20, 1938	
	Louisville	Steam		1838	1844	
	Louisville	Horse		1844	1901	
Louisville Railway	Louisville	Electric		1889	April 30, 1948	See also New Albany and Jeffersonville, Indiana.
Maysville Street Railroad and Transfer Company	Maysville	Horse		1884	?	
	Maysville	Electric		January 16, 1891	?	
	Middlesboro	Horse		c. 1880s	?	
	Middlesboro	Steam		?	?	
Owensboro City Railroad Company	Owensboro	Horse	February 17, 1887	c. 1880s	?	
Evansville and Ohio Valley Railway	Owensboro	Electric		?	April 14, 1934	
Paducah Street Railway Company	Paducah	Horse		c. 1880s	?	
	Paducah	Electric		?	1932	
	Somerset	Electric		?	?	
	Winchester	Electric		?	?	

- Peschkes states that, despite various evidence, the following towns did not have streetcar systems:
  - Barbourville – Peschkes describes "a marvellous picture postcard of a horse tramcar in the main street of Barbourville, with a woman driver," dated 1917. Similar picture postcards exist for U.S. towns that did not have horsecar or streetcar systems.
  - Mount Sterling.

== Louisiana ==
Name	Location	Motive power	Type	Opened	Closed	Notes
	Abita Springs	Horse		?	?	
	Alexandria	Horse		June 19, 1891	June 19, 1899	
	Alexandria	Electric		April 12, 1906	December 18, 1926	
	♦ Algiers	Horse		1884	September 1, 1907	
	♦ Algiers	Electric		September 1, 1907	January 22, 1931	
	Baton Rouge	Mule		October 16, 1890	April 5, 1893	Two mule car lines, later connected as a belt line.
	Baton Rouge	Electric		April 6, 1893	April 23, 1936	Three lines at peak in 1924-1932
	Burnside	Horse		?	?	
	Grand Isle	Horse		1866	1893	
	Lake Charles	Horse		1891	?	
	Lake Charles	Steam		1893	1906	
	Lake Charles	Electric		February 1, 1906	June 29, 1927	
	Monroe	Electric		June 15, 1906	August 21, 1938	
	**New Orleans**	Horse		April 23, 1831	?	
	**New Orleans**	Steam		September 27, 1832	?	
	**New Orleans**	Electric		February 1, 1893		See Streetcars in New Orleans. Operation suspended 28 Aug 2005 – 18 Dec 2005 because of storm damage (Hurricane Katrina).
Shreveport City Railroad Company	Shreveport	Horse		December 31, 1870	October 16, 1893	
	Shreveport	Electric		October 4, 1890	December 10, 1939	

== Maine ==
Name	Location	Motive power	Type	Opened	Closed	Notes
Augusta, Winthrop and Gardiner Street Railway (in German)	Augusta	Electric		July 26, 1889	July 31, 1932	
	Bangor	Electric		May 21, 1889	December 31, 1945	
	Bath	Electric		c. 1890s	1932	
	Biddeford	Horse		July 9, 1888	May 5, 1892	Connected Biddeford and Saco.
	Biddeford	Electric		?	July 5, 1939	
	Brunswick	Electric		?	?	
	Calais	Electric		July 4, 1894	October 31, 1929	International tramway, connected Calais and St. Stephen (New Brunswick), Canada (q.v.).
	Fairfield	Horse		1888		
	Fairfield	Electric		?	?	
Fryeburg Horse Railroad	Fryeburg	Horse		May 18, 1888	October 1, 1913	
	Lewiston	Horse		September 3, 1881	1896	Connected Lewiston and Auburn.
	Lewiston	Electric		?	September 6, 1941	
	Lewiston	Electric	Portland-Lewiston Interurban	July 7, 1914	June 29, 1933	Connected to Portland
The Norway – Paris Street Railway	Norway	Electric		1895	1918	Connected Norway and South Paris.
	Portland	Horse		October 13, 1863	December 17, 1895	
	Portland	Electric		June 20, 1891	May 4, 1941	
	Rockland	Electric		August 1, 1892	April 1, 1931	
	Sanford	Electric		c. 1890s	April 27, 1947	
	Waterville	Horse		June 23, 1888	1892	
	Waterville	Electric		July 20, 1892	October 11, 1937	

== Maryland ==
Name	Location	Motive power	Type	Opened	Closed	Notes
	Annapolis	Electric		?	?	
	Baltimore (first era)	Horse		1859	?	
	Baltimore (first era)	Cable		May 23, 1891	March 23, 1899	
	Baltimore (first era)	Electric		?	November 3, 1963	Guilford Avenue had a 3 stop elevated line for streetcars.
Baltimore Light RailLink	**Baltimore** (second era)	Electric	Light rail	April 1992		
	Buena Vista – Buena Vista Springs	Horse		?	?	
	Chesapeake Beach	Steam		?	?	
	Chesapeake Beach	Electric		?	?	
	Chesapeake Beach	Petrol (gasoline)		?	c. 1921	
Cumberland and Westernport Electric Railway	Cumberland	Horse		?	?	
Cumberland and Westernport Electric Railway	Cumberland	Electric		c. 1890s	1932	
Hagerstown and Frederick Railway	Frederick	Electric		c. 1890s	1937	
Hagerstown and Frederick Railway	Hagerstown	Electric		c. 1890s	1939	
Baltimore and Annapolis Railroad	Baltimore	Steam & Electric	Interuban	1887	1950	
Baltimore and Annapolis Railroad	Annapolis, Maryland	Steam & Electric	Interuban	1887	1950	

== Massachusetts ==
Name	Location	Motive power	Type	Opened	Closed	Notes
	Attleboro	Horse		c. 1870s	?	
	Attleboro	Electric		?	1932	
MBTA Green Line; Mattapan Line	**Boston**	Horse		March 26, 1856	December 24, 1900	
MBTA Green Line; Mattapan Line	**Boston**	Electric	Portion (MBTA Green Line) upgraded to light rail in the 1970s	January 1, 1889		See Boston-area streetcar lines. The surviving portions are the Mattapan Line and the MBTA Green Line. See also: Category:Streetcars in the Boston area.
Brockton Street Railway Company	Brockton	Horse		July 6, 1881	?	
	Brockton	Electric		September 5, 1890	July 11, 1937	
	Conway	Horse		April 1, 1895	1921	
	Fall River	Horse		1873	1891	
	Fall River	Electric		1892	September 19, 1936	
Fitchburg Street Railway Company	Fitchburg	Horse		July 1, 1886	?	
	Fitchburg	Electric		?	1932	Connected Fitchburg and Leominster.
	Framingham	Electric		c. 1880s	1925	
	Gardner	Electric		c. 1890s	1924	
Gloucester Street Railway	Gloucester	Horse		June 12, 1886	?	
	Gloucester	Electric		?	1919	
Connecticut Valley Street Railway	Greenfield	Electric		June 24, 1895	July 7, 1934	
Haverhill and Groveland Street Railway Company	Haverhill	Horse		August 1877	?	
	Haverhill	Electric		?	August 29, 1936	
Holyoke Street Railway	Holyoke	Horse		June 11, 1884	1891	
Holyoke Street Railway	Holyoke	Electric	Interurban; 1 funicular line	1891	1937	Included Amherst & Sunderland, Mount Tom, and Hampshire Street Railways; bus service began 1921, became exclusively buses in 1937; served as operator for PVTA from 1977 until 1987 when service ceased, company dissolved 1991.
Merrimack Valley Horse Railroad Company	Lawrence	Horse		December 23, 1867	?	
	Lawrence	Electric		?	March 1936	
Lowell Horse Railroad Company	Lowell (first era)	Horse		c. 1870s	?	
Lowell & Suburban Street Railway Company	Lowell (first era)	Electric		?	March 1936	
Lowell National Historical Park Trolley	**Lowell** (second era)	Electric		1984		Resurrected as a 1-mile **heritage streetcar** line, operational; expansion into commuter interurban proposed and discussed 1999–2016.
	Lynn	Horse		1854	?	Lynn and Boston Railroad
	Lynn	Electric		November 19, 1888	1937	The first electric trolley / streetcar in Massachusetts
Natick and Cochituate Street Railway	Natick	Horse		July 30, 1885		
Union Street Railway Company	New Bedford	Horse		July 1, 1872	?	
Union Street Railway Company	New Bedford	Electric		1894	1947	
	Newburyport	Horse		?	?	
Black Rocks and Salisbury Beach Street Railway Company	Newburyport	Steam				
	Newburyport	Electric		?	August 27, 1930	
	Newton	Horse		?	?	
	Newton	Electric		?	c. 1930s	
Northampton Street Railway	Northampton	Horse		October 16, 1866	?	
	Northampton	Electric		?	1933	
Oak Bluffs Street Railway	Oak Bluffs	Horse		1873		
Oak Bluffs Street Railway	Oak Bluffs	Electric		1895	1918	
Pittsfield Street Railway	Pittsfield	Horse		July 3, 1886	?	
	Pittsfield	Electric		?	1932	
Plymouth and Brockton Street Railway	Plymouth	Horse		1888	?	Has operated since 1928 as a bus carrier.
Plymouth and Brockton Street Railway	Plymouth	Electric		?	1928	Has operated since 1928 as a bus carrier.
Quincy Street Railroad	Quincy	Horse		July 4, 1888	?	
	Quincy	Electric		October 1, 1889	1948	
Naumkeag Street Railway Company	Salem	Horse		?	?	
	Salem	Electric		1888	March 1, 1937	
Springfield Street Railway	Springfield	Horse		March 10, 1870	?	
	Springfield	Electric		June 6, 1890	1940	
	Stoneham	Electric		?	July 27, 1946	
Taunton Street Railway Company	Taunton	Horse		September 23, 1871	?	
	Taunton	Electric		Sep 3, 1893	July 1932	
Waltham and Newton Street Railway Company	Waltham	Horse		?	?	
	Waltham	Electric		?	c. 1930s	
Ware & Brookfield Street Railway	Ware	Electric	Interueban	1901	1918	
North Woburn Street Railroad Company	Woburn	Horse				
Worcester Consolidated Street Railway	Worcester	Horse		c. 1860s	?	
Worcester Consolidated Street Railway	Worcester	Electric		?	December 31, 1945	

== Michigan ==
Name	Location	Motive power	Type	Opened	Closed	Notes
	Adrian	Electric		September 20, 1889	June 28, 1924	
	Ann Arbor	Horse		?	?	
	Ann Arbor	Electric		September 28, 1890	January 31, 1925	
Battle Creek Street Railway Company	Battle Creek	Horse		1883	?	
	Battle Creek	Electric		1893 September 30, 1932		
	Bay City	Electric		?	August 1921	
	Benton Harbor	Horse		?	?	
	Benton Harbor	Electric		1892	September 1935	System also served St. Joseph.
	Cheboygan	Horse		1893	September 1898	Service suspended between 1896 and early 1898
	Cheboygan			1896	1898	
Department of Street Railways (The DSR) 1922-1956	Detroit (first era)	Horse		August 3, 1863	November 9, 1895	
Department of Street Railways (The DSR) 1922-1956	Detroit (first era)	Electric		September 1, 1886	April 8, 1956	See also: Detroit United Railway (1900–1922). Detroit had a heritage streetcar line, 1976–2003; see Detroit Downtown Trolley.
QLine	**Detroit** (second era)	Electric		May 12, 2017		Reintroduction; see QLine.
	Escanaba	Electric		1892	1932	
	Fenton	Horse		?	c. 1916	
	Flint	Horse		?	?	
	Flint	Electric		1900	April 4, 1936	
	Grand Haven	Electric		?	?	
	Grand Rapids	Horse		1864	?	
	Grand Rapids	Cable		April 18, 1888	November 12, 1891	
	Grand Rapids	Electric		?	August 25, 1935	
	Holland	Electric		?	?	
	Iron River	Electric		1913	1921	
	Ishpeming	Electric		c. 1893	August 20, 1927	
Jackson City Railway Company	Jackson	Horse		?	?	
	Jackson	Electric		September 19, 1891	June 27, 1936	
Kalamazoo Street Railway Company	Kalamazoo	Horse		June 1884	?	
	Kalamazoo	Electric		June 1893	November 2, 1932	
Lansing City Railway Company	Lansing	Horse		1886	?	
	Lansing	Electric		August 26, 1890	April 15, 1933	
	Manistee	Electric		1892	August 26, 1921	
	Marquette	Electric		1891	April 19, 1935	
	Menominee	Electric		c. 1890	1928	System also served Marinette, Wisconsin.
	Monroe	Electric		?	?	
	Mount Clemens	Horse		1890	?	
	Mount Clemens	Electric		1900	c. 1930	
Muskegon Railway Company	Muskegon	Horse		November 25, 1882	?	
	Muskegon	Electric		April 15, 1890	October 10, 1929	
	Owosso	Electric		1911	1929	Connected Owosso and Corunna.
	Pontiac	Electric		1900	1932	
Port Huron Street Railway Company	Port Huron	Horse		c. 1860s	?	
Port Huron Electric Railway Company	Port Huron	Electric		c. 1886	January 28, 1930	See also Sarnia, Ontario, Canada.
City of Saginaw Street Railroad Company	Saginaw	Horse		December 1863	c. 1890s	
	Saginaw	Electric		1890	October 9, 1931	Operation suspended Aug 1921 – 1 Nov 1923 because of dispute between street railway company and local authority.
	Sault Ste. Marie	Electric		1888	July 8, 1931	See also Sault Ste. Marie, Ontario, Canada.

== Minnesota ==
Name	Location	Motive power	Type	Opened	Closed	Notes
	Anoka	Horse		1884 1908	1897 1908	
	Brainerd	Horse		1887	1889	
	Brainerd	Electric		1893	June 2, 1898	
	Breckenridge	Electric		August 30, 1910	March 31, 1925	Interstate streetcar line, connecting Breckenridge with Wahpeton, North Dakota. Ranked as the smallest interstate streetcar system (and one of the smallest urban streetcar systems) in the U.S.
Duluth Street Railway	Duluth	Horse		1882	1890	
Duluth Street Railway	Duluth	Electric	November 1, 1882	1890	September 9, 1939	System served Duluth and Superior, Wisconsin. Two funiculars operated in Duluth. The 7th Avenue West Incline which operated as part of the streetcar system, and the independent Duluth Belt Line Railway
Mesaba Railway Company	Hibbing	Electric	Interurban	December 11, 1921	April 16, 1927	
American Traction Company	International Falls	Electric		1891	October 1895	
American Traction Company	International Falls	Accumulator (storage battery)		1913	1919	Occasional reports, described by Wyatt as "unproven," state that accumulator (storage battery) tramcars operated on the railway bridge to Fort Francis, Ontario, Canada.
Mankato Street Railway Company	Mankato	Horse		July 23, 1886	1895	
Mankato Street Railway Company	Mankato	Electric		May 10, 1908	March 8, 1930	
Twin City Rapid Transit Company	Minneapolis (first era)	Horse		September 2, 1875	December 23, 1889	
Twin City Rapid Transit Company	Minneapolis (first era)	Electric		December 23, 1889	June 18, 1954	See also Como-Harriet Streetcar Line (Heritage streetcar).
METRO	**Minneapolis** (second era)	Electric	Light rail	June 26, 2004		**Blue** (2004) & **Green** (2014) lines.
	Moorhead	Electric		December 9, 1912	June 30, 1937	Operated as part of Fargo, North Dakota, streetcar system.
Granite City Railway	St. Cloud	Horse		October 3, 1887	1892	
Granite City Railway	St. Cloud	Electric		June 30, 1892	April 29, 1936	
	♦ St. Paul	Horse		July 15, 1872	?	
	♦ St. Paul	Cable		January 21, 1888	June 3, 1898	
	♦ St. Paul	Electric		?	July 18, 1954	
Stillwater St. Ry.	Stillwater	Electric		June 27, 1899	1897	
Minneapolis & St. Paul Suburban Ry.	Stillwater	Electric		November 6, 1899	September 10, 1932	The Minneapolis & St. Paul Suburban Ry. was a wholly owned subsidiary of TCRT created for their new line to Stillwater and its local lines, as they were their first lines to extend beyond the boundaries of Minneapolis and St. Paul.
	Winona	Horse		December 25, 1883	?	
	Winona	Electric		January 22, 1892	July 21, 1938	

== Mississippi ==
Name	Location	Motive power	Type	Opened	Closed	Notes
	Biloxi	Electric		c. 1890s	1932	
	Columbus	Electric		[data missing]	1920	
Enterprise Street Railway Company	Enterprise	Horse		[data missing]	[data missing]	
	Greenville	Electric		c. 1880s	1929	
	♦ Gulfport	Electric		c. 1900s	1932	
	Hattiesburg	Electric		c. 1900s	[data missing]	
Jackson City Railroad	Jackson	Mule		October 18, 1871	1899	
	Jackson	Electric		1899	1935	
	Laurel	Electric		[data missing]	1934	
Meridian Street Railway Company	Meridian	Horse		c. 1880s	[data missing]	
	Meridian	Electric		[data missing]	[data missing]	
Natchez Street Railway	Natchez	Horse		c. 1890s	[data missing]	
	Natchez	Electric		[data missing]	1928	
	Pascagoula	Electric		[data missing]	[data missing]	
	Vicksburg	Electric		April 24, 1899	1935	
	Yazoo City	Electric		1911	1918	

== Missouri ==
Name	Location	Motive power	Type	Opened	Closed	Notes
	Ava – Mansfield	Steam		?	?	
	Ava – Mansfield	Petrol (gasoline)		?	?	
Cape Girardeau & Jackson Interurban Railway	Cape Girardeau	Horse		1893	1905	
Cape Girardeau & Jackson Interurban Railway	Cape Girardeau	Electric		1905	1934	
	Carrollton	Steam		1893	?	
	Carrollton	Electric		August 30, 1897	?	
	Carthage	Horse		October 17, 1883	January 24, 1885	
	Carthage	Electric		August 24, 1895	July 21, 1935	
	♦ Carthage – Carterville	Electric		?	?	See also: Joplin (below).
	Clinton	Horse		?	?	
	Farmington – Delassus	Electric		?	?	
	♦ Farmington – St. Francois	Electric		?	?	
	Hannibal	Horse		?	?	
	Hannibal	Electric		c. 1880s	?	
	♦ Independence	Horse		1886	?	
	♦ Independence	Steam		1886	?	
	♦ Independence	Electric		?	1935	
	Jefferson City	Electric		1911	1934	
	Joplin	Horse		c. 1880s	?	
	Joplin	Electric		?	1935	
	Joplin	Petrol (gasoline)		?	?	
	♦ Joplin – Duenweg – Carterville	Electric		?	?	
	♦ Joplin – Galena, Kansas – Baxter Springs, Kansas – Picher, Oklahoma	Electric		?	?	
	♦ Joplin – Pittsburg, Kansas	Electric		?	?	See also: Pittsburg, Kansas.
	♦ Joplin – Webb City	Horse		?	?	
	♦ Joplin – Webb City	Electric		?	?	
	Kansas City (first era)	Horse		April 1869	?	
	Kansas City (first era)	Steam		?	?	
	Kansas City (first era)	Cable		June 24, 1884	October 13, 1913	
	Kansas City (first era)	Electric		?	June 23, 1957	See Streetcars in Kansas City.
KC Streetcar	**Kansas City** (second era)	Electric		May 6, 2016		Reintroduction; see KC Streetcar.
	Lebanon	Electric		?	?	
	Nevada	Horse		?	?	
	Nevada	Electric		?	?	
	♦ North Kansas City	Horse		?	?	
	♦ North Kansas City	Electric		?	?	
	St. Joseph	Horse		March 15, 1877	?	
	St. Joseph	Electric		?	1939	
	St. Louis (first era)	Horse		1859	1896	
	St. Louis (first era)	Steam		?	?	
	St. Louis (first era)	Cable		April 15, 1886	March 14, 1901	
	St. Louis (first era)	Electric		?	June 20, 1966	See Streetcars in St. Louis.
MetroLink	**St. Louis** (second era)	Electric	Light rail	July 31, 1993		**Reintroduction**, as St. Louis MetroLink light rail.
Loop Trolley	**St. Louis** (second era)	Electric		November 16, 2018		New heritage tramway
	Sedalia	Horse		?	?	
	Sedalia	Electric		c. 1890s	1931	
Springfield Traction Company	Springfield	Horse		?	1929	
Springfield Traction Company	Springfield	Steam		?	?	
Springfield Traction Company	Springfield	Electric		c. 1885	August 17, 1937	
	Trenton	Electric		?	?	
	♦ Webb City	Horse		?	?	
	♦ Webb City	Electric		?	?	
	♦Webb City – Carterville	Horse		?	?	
	♦Webb City – Carterville	Electric		?	?	

- Peschkes states that, despite various evidence, the following towns did not have streetcar systems:
  - Excelsior Springs.
  - Lexington.

== Montana ==
Name	Location	Motive power	Type	Opened	Closed	Notes
	Anaconda	Electric		September 1, 1890	December 31, 1951	
	Billings	Horse		1882	1883	
	Billings	Accumulator (storage battery)		April 4, 1912	1917	
	Bozeman	Electric		July 21, 1892	December 15, 1921	
	Butte	Horse		1886	?	
	Butte	Cable		March 4, 1889	September 19, 1897	
	Butte	Electric		August 26, 1890	August 22, 1937	
	Great Falls	Electric		August 18, 1891	November 30, 1931	
	Great Falls	Horse		1892	1893	
	Helena	Horse		September 25, 1886	?	
	Helena	Electric		May 25, 1890	January 1, 1928	
	Missoula	Horse		1897	?	
	Missoula	Electric		1892 May 11, 1910	1897 Jan 24, 1932	

== Nebraska ==
Name	Location	Motive power	Type	Opened	Closed	Notes
	Beatrice	Electric		?	1897	
	Fremont	Horse		?	?	
	Grand Island	Horse		?	1898	
	Hastings	Horse		November 1, 1887	?	
	Kearney	Electric		?	1898	
	Lincoln	Horse		November 1, 1883	1906	
	Lincoln	Electric		1891	September 1, 1945	
	Nebraska City	Horse		January 1, 1890	1910	
	Norfolk	Electric		December 15, 1887	1897	
Omaha Horse Railway Company	Omaha	Horse		1868	1895	
Omaha Traction Company	Omaha	Cable		December 29, 1887	July 7, 1890	
Omaha and Council Bluffs Railway and Bridge Company	Omaha	Electric		1886	1955	
Omaha Streetcar (planned)	Omaha	Electric		2027	?	
	Plattsmouth	Electric		?	1892	
	Red Cloud	Horse		1887	c. 1917–1918	
	Wymore	Horse		November 1885	?	
	York	Horse		?	?	

== Nevada ==
Name	Location	Motive power	Type	Opened	Closed	Notes
	Reno	Electric		November 1904	September 1927	See Streetcars in Reno.

== New Hampshire ==
Name	Location	Motive power	Type	Opened	Closed	Notes
Berlin Street Railway	Berlin-Gorham	Electric		July 4, 1902	December 1, 1938	Connected Berlin and Gorham through Cascade
Springfield Electric Railway (1897–1921); Springfield Terminal Railroad (1921–1956)	Charlestown	Electric		1897	1956	Connected Charlestown with Springfield, Vermont.
Claremont Railway and Light Company	Claremont	Electric		1903	1945	
	Concord	Horse		April 1881	1890	
	Concord	Electric		1890	April 29, 1933	
	Dover	Horse		1882	?	
	Dover	Electric		August 16, 1889	September 15, 1926	
	Exeter	Electric		1897	1924	
Keene Electric Railway	Keene	Electric		1900	1926	
	Laconia	Horse		August 19, 1882	?	
	Laconia	Electric		?	1926	
Manchester Street Railway	Manchester	Horse		1877	?	
Manchester Street Railway	Manchester	Electric		1895	May 2, 1940	
	Nashua	Horse		May 19, 1886	?	
	Nashua	Electric		?	1932	
Portsmouth Electric Railway	Portsmouth	Electric		1899	1925	
	Rochester	Electric		September 1, 1889	May 6, 1925	

== New Jersey ==
Name	Location	Motive power	Type	Opened	Closed	Notes
	Asbury Park	Horse		?	?	
	Asbury Park	Electric		September 19, 1897	1931	
	Atlantic City	Horse		?	?	
	Atlantic City	Electric		?	December 27, 1955	see also Shore Fast Line.
	Beach Haven	Horse		?	?	
Bridgeton and Millville Traction Company	Bridgeton	Electric		?	?	see also Millville and Vineland.
	Brigantine	Electric		?	?	
	Camden (first era)	Horse		1871	?	
	Camden (first era)	Electric		?	1935	Also served Gloucester City and other neighboring towns.
	♦ Camden-Trenton	Electric		c. 1900	1931	
River Line (NJ Transit)	**Camden** (second era)	Diesel	Light rail	March 14, 2004		
	Cape May	Horse		?	?	
	Cape May	Steam		? 1916	1892 1918	
	Cape May	Electric		1892	1913	
	Cape May	Accumulator (storage battery)		1916	1916	
	Elizabeth	Horse		1869	?	
	Elizabeth	Coal Gas		?	?	Coal gas is also known as Town gas and is not the same as petrol (gasoline).
	Elizabeth	Electric		?	February 18, 1931	Newark – Elizabeth tramway line closed 3 Jan 1937.
Public Service Coordinated Transport (Bergen Division) and predecessors	Fort Lee	Electric		April 20, 1896	September 5, 1938	
	Gibbsboro – Lucaston	Horse		?	?	
	Gibbsboro – Lucaston	Steam		?	?	
	Hackensack	Electric		?	1938	
	Hudson County (first era)	Horse		1860	?	
	Hudson County (first era)	Electric		?	August 7, 1949	Date refers to abandonment of the last lines using the Hoboken Inclined Elevated viaduct.
Hudson–Bergen Light Rail	**Hudson County** (second era)	Electric	Light rail	April 22, 2000		
	Keansburg	Electric		?	?	
	Keyport	Horse		?	?	
	Keyport	Electric		c. 1890s	1923	
	Long Branch	Horse		?	?	
	Long Branch	Electric		?	?	
	Metuchen	Electric		?	?	
Millville Traction Company	Millville	Electric		?	?	see also Bridgeton.
	Morristown	Electric		?	1927	
	Mount Holly	Horse		?	?	
	New Brunswick	Horse		October 15, 1886	?	
	New Brunswick	Electric		1895	August 1, 1931	Suburban tramway line closed 26 Oct 1931.
	**Newark**	Horse		1859	1893	
	**Newark**	Cable				Line built and tested, but not placed in service because of technical problems.
	**Newark**	Electric	Light rail (modern era)	October 1890 (May 26, 1935)	See Note.	See: Newark Light Rail (aka. Newark City Subway). See also: Note, below.
	Ocean City	Electric		?	?	see also Atlantic City
	Ortley Beach	Horse		?	?	
	Passaic	Electric		?	?	Newark – Passaic tramway closed 20 Mar 1937.
	Paterson	Horse		1863	?	
	Paterson	Steam		?	?	
	Paterson	Coal Gas		?	?	Coal gas is also known as Town gas and is not the same as petrol (gasoline).
	Paterson	Accumulator (storage battery)		?	?	
	Paterson	Electric		?	May 1, 1928	Newark – Paterson tramway line closed 1938.
	Phillipsburg	Horse		?	?	
	Phillipsburg	Electric		1894	October 31, 1931	See also Easton, Pennsylvania.
	Plainfield	Electric		1901	1925	Newark – Plainfield tramway line closed 15 Sep 1935.
	Point Pleasant	Horse		?	?	
	Point Pleasant	Electric		?	1919	
	Red Bank	Electric		1896	1921	
	Rutherford	Horse		?	?	
	Rutherford	Electric		1896	1921	
	Sea Isle City	Electric		?	?	
	Stone Harbor – Cape May Court House	Steam		?	?	
	Stone Harbor – Cape May Court House	Petrol (gasoline)		?	?	
	Trenton (first era)	Horse		?	?	
	Trenton (first era)	Electric		?	December 6, 1934	
River Line	**Trenton** (second era)	Diesel	Light rail	March 14, 2004		
	Vineland	Electric		?	?	
	Wildwood	Electric		?	1946	

- Note for Newark: The streetcar subway, the Newark City Subway, opened May 26, 1935. Also served East Orange and other neighboring towns. (See also Public Service Railway and Newark-Trenton Fast Line.) Last Newark streecar line not using the subway closed May 1, 1938. Last surface streetcar lines using the subway closed March 30, 1952. Since then, effectively operated as a "light rail" line; line extended in 2002. System expanded to include a second line in 2006.

== New Mexico ==
Name	Location	Motive power	Type	Opened	Closed	Notes
	Albuquerque	Horse		May 11, 1881	August 1904	
	Albuquerque	Electric		c. 1903	December 31, 1927	Reintroduction planned.
	Las Vegas	Horse		c. 1880s	?	
	Las Vegas	Electric		?	1928	

== New York ==
Name	Location	Motive power	Type	Opened	Closed	Notes
United Traction Co.	♦ Albany	Horse		February 22, 1864	1921	
United Traction Co.	♦ Albany	Electric		1890	August 1, 1946	
	♦♦ Albia – Averill Park	Electric		October 5, 1895	March 31, 1925	Albia is a former suburb and current neighborhood of Troy, New York
	Amsterdam	Horse		July 4, 1873	?	
	Amsterdam	Electric		December 20, 1890	September 1, 1936	
	Auburn	Electric		?	?	
Babylon Rail Road Company	♦ Babylon	Horse		1871	1909	
Babylon Rail Road Company	♦ Babylon	Electric		1909	May 15, 1920	
Babylon Rail Road Company	♦♦ Babylon – Amityville	Electric		1909	May 15, 1920	
	Batavia	Electric		September 1903	June 13, 1927	
	Beacon	Electric		August 27, 1892	April 20, 1930	Connected Beacon and Fishkill
	Binghamton	Horse		1873	1893	
	Binghamton	Electric		May 31, 1887	August 1, 1932	
	♦ Binghamton – Port Dickinson – Johnson City	Horse		c. January 1, 1883	July 1, 1892	
	♦ Binghamton – Port Dickinson – Johnson City	Electric		1892	August 1, 1932	
Paul Smith's Electric Railway	♦ Brighton, Franklin County-Saranac Lake, New York	Electric		1906	1928	
Paul Smith's Electric Railway	♦ Brighton, Franklin County-Saranac Lake, New York	Petrol (Gasoline)		1928	1930	Connected Brighton, Franklin County and Saranac Lake with Paul Smith's Hotel.
	♦ Bronx	Horse		?	?	
	♦ Bronx	Electric		1892	August 21, 1948	
	♦ Brooklyn	Horse		?	?	
	♦ Brooklyn	Electric		1890	October 30, 1956	
	Buffalo (first era)	Horse		June 11, 1860	1893	
	Buffalo (first era)	Electric		June 20, 1889	July 1, 1950	
	♦ Buffalo – Depew	Electric		May 8, 1901	September 23, 1926	
	♦ Buffalo – Gardenville – Ebenezer	Electric		April 18, 1896	December 12, 1931	
	♦ Buffalo – Hamburg	Electric		October 6, 1900	December 12, 1931	
	♦ Buffalo – Williamsville	Electric		April 5, 1893	September 18, 1930	
Buffalo Metro Rail	**Buffalo** (second era)	Electric	Light rail	October 9, 1984		
	Canandaigua	Horse		October 1, 1887	July 1892	
	Canandaigua	Electric		August 4, 1894	July 31, 1930	
	Catskill	Electric		December 14, 1900	by October 31, 1917	
	♦ Charlotte – Manitou Beach	Electric		June 1, 1891	August 25, 1925	
Pelham Park and City Island Railway	♦♦ City Island	Horse		May 20, 1887	1914	
Pelham Park and City Island Railway	♦♦ City Island	Accumulator (storage battery)		August 17, 1914	August 9, 1919	
	♦ Cohoes	Horse		1864	?	
	♦ Cohoes	Electric		1890	February 6, 1934	
	Corning	Electric		November 1, 1895	April 1, 1930	
	Cortland	Horse		September 14, 1885	?	
	Cortland	Electric		April 1, 1895	1928	
	♦ Cortland – Homer – McGraw – Preble	Horse		September 14, 1885	?	Connected Cortland and Homer.
	♦ Cortland – Homer – McGraw – Preble	Electric		April 1, 1895	February 15, 1931	
	Dunkirk	Electric		July 1, 1900 1917	1917 by August 1923	
	♦ Dunkirk – Fredonia	Horse		September 1866	1891	
	♦ Dunkirk – Fredonia	Electric		October 30, 1891	March 25, 1934	
Northport Traction Company	♦ East Northport - Northport	Electric		April 18, 1902	August 19, 1924	
	Elmira	Horse		October 1871	?	
	Elmira	Steam		July 23, 1889	?	
	Elmira	Electric		August 30, 1890	March 11, 1939	
Ocean Electric Railway (originally Far Rockaway Railroad)	♦♦ Far Rockaway	Horse		July 2, 1886	1898	
Ocean Electric Railway (originally Far Rockaway Railroad)	♦♦ Far Rockaway	Electric		1898	September 24, 1924	
	Fonda – Fultonville	Horse		1875	July 11, 1884	
	Frankfort – Ilion – Mohawk – Herkimer	Horse		July 4, 1871	c. 1895	
	Frankfort – Ilion – Mohawk – Herkimer	Electric		c. 1895	June 30, 1933	
	♦ Fredonia	Horse		September 1886		
	♦ Fredonia	Electric		May 15, 1910	July 1927	
Seashore Municipal Railroad	♦ Freeport	Electric		1906	1924	
	Fulton	Horse		August 15, 1886	by 1908	
	Fulton	Electric		?	September 15, 1927	
	Geneva	Electric		March 27, 1895	1925	
	♦ Geneva – Waterloo – Seneca Falls – Cayuga	Steam		1886	?	
	♦ Geneva – Waterloo – Seneca Falls – Cayuga	Electric		July 13, 1890	December 6, 1928	Closed in stages, completed March 27, 1895.
	Glens Falls	Horse		October 1, 1885	?	
	Glens Falls	Electric		1891	June 30, 1928	
Fonda, Johnstown and Gloversville Railroad	Gloversville	Electric		?	?	
	♦ Gloversville – Mountain Lake	Electric		August 23, 1901	September 30, 1917	
	♦ Highland – New Paltz	Electric		August 17, 1897	July 7, 1925	
	Hornell	Electric		August 6, 1892	July 15, 1926	
	♦ Hornell – Canisteo	Electric		December 30, 1892	July 15, 1926	
Huntington Railroad	♦ Huntington	Horse		July 19, 1890	1898	Replaced by Huntington Traction Company (1920–1927)
Huntington Railroad	♦ Huntington	Electric		June 17, 1898	August 15, 1927	Replaced by Huntington Traction Company (1920–1927)
Huntington Railroad	♦♦ Huntington – Amityville	Electric		August 26, 1909	September 23, 1919	
	Ithaca	Electric		January 2, 1888 January 28, 1893	May 1892 June 22, 1935	
	Jamestown	Horse		June 20, 1884	c. 1892	
	Jamestown	Electric		June 11, 1891	January 29, 1938	
Fonda, Johnstown and Gloversville Railroad	Johnstown	Electric		?	?	
Kingston City; Colonial City	♦ Kingston	Horse		1867	?	
Kingston City; Colonial City	♦ Kingston	Electric		1894	September 30, 1930	Merged to Kingston Consolidated Railway Co.
	♦ Larchmont	Horse		May 1, 1888	?	
	♦ Larchmont	Electric		June 10, 1900	August 16, 1927	
	Lima – Honeoye	Electric		August 8, 1899	by October 30, 1915	
	Lockport	Horse		January 1, 1887	1891	
	Lockport	Electric		August 20, 1895	April 16, 1938	
Long Beach Railway	♦ Long Beach	Petrol (gasoline)		October 20, 1923	1926	
	Long Island					See also the entries for New York City.
	♦ Manhattan	Horse		November 14, 1832	1917	
	♦ Manhattan	Cable		August 31, 1885	May 25, 1901	
	♦ Manhattan	Accumulator (storage battery)		1910	1932	
	♦ Manhattan	Electric		?	June 21, 1947	Last tramway line in New York, which operated on the Queensboro Bridge between Manhattan and Queens, closed April 7, 1957.
	Mechanicville–Stillwater	Horse		May 30, 1883		
	Middletown	Electric		May 8, 1894	April 9, 1924	
	♦ Middletown- Goshen	Electric		November 25, 1895	October 21, 1924	
	♦ Mount Vernon	Electric		?	1950	
	♦ New Rochelle	Electric		?	1950	
	New York City					See also Long Island and Westchester County.
	Newburgh	Horse		December 24, 1886	May 1894	
	Newburgh	Electric		June 9, 1894	March 31, 1923	
	♦ Newburgh – Orange Lake – Walden	Electric		July 1894	1923	See note.
	♦ Niagara Falls	Horse		July 2, 1883	?	
	♦ Niagara Falls	Electric		July 1892	August 22, 1937	
	Ogdensburg	Horse		August 14, 1886	1895	
	Ogdensburg	Electric		September 1, 1895	April 1, 1932	
	Oneida	Horse		July 4, 1885	July 30, 1902	
	Oneida	Electric		December 14, 1902	December 1930	
	Oneonta	Electric		?	?	
	♦ Ossining	Electric		1893 October 1, 1907	October 20, 1906 May 7, 1926	
	Oswego	Horse		August 22, 1885	1892	
	Oswego	Electric		1892	April 21, 1927	
Suffolk Traction Company	♦ Patchogue	Accumulator (storage battery)		July 1, 1911	October 10, 1919	
Suffolk Traction Company	♦ Patchogue – Holtsville	Accumulator (storage battery)		1914	October 10, 1919	Extension Holtsville – Port Jefferson started, not completed.
Suffolk Traction Company	♦♦ Patchogue – Sayville	Accumulator (storage battery)		by 1914	October 10, 1919	
	♦ Peekskill	Electric		June 1899	June 30, 1926	
	♦♦ Peekskill – Lake Mohegan	Electric		July 30, 1899	1924	
	♦♦ Peekskill – Oregon	Electric		March 25, 1907	August 29, 1925	Closed in stages, completed 1909.
	♦♦ Peekskill – Verplanck	Electric		1902	June 30, 1926	
	Penn Yan – Branchport	Electric		August 15, 1897 January 1, 1927	October 11, 1926 March 13, 1927	
Plattsburgh Traction Company	Plattsburgh	Electric		July 25, 1896	November 1, 1929	
Larchmont Horse Railway	♦ Port Chester	Horse		1888	1901	
Port Chester Street Railway	♦ Port Chester	Electric		July 12, 1898	August 16, 1927	Acquired by New York and Stamford Railway in 1901
	Port Jervis	Electric		January 15, 1898 July 4, 1910	June 9, 1910 November 15, 1924	
	Poughkeepsie	Horse		1871	1894	
	Poughkeepsie	Electric		December 15, 1894	November 25, 1935	
	♦ Poughkeepsie – Wappingers Falls	Electric		1895	November 1928	
	♦ Queens	Horse		1869	?	
	♦ Queens	Electric		1887	April 26, 1950	
	Redwood – Alexandria Bay	Electric		August 18, 1902	October 16, 1916	
	♦ Rensselaer	Electric		November 4, 1897	c. 1930s	
	Rochester	Horse		July 13, 1863	1893	
	Rochester	Electric		1889	April 1, 1941	
Ocean Electric Railway (originally Rockaway Village Railroad)	♦♦ Rockaway Park	Horse		June 2, 1886 1897	1895 1898	
Ocean Electric Railway (originally Rockaway Village Railroad)	♦♦ Rockaway Park	Electric		1898	August 26, 1928	See note.
	Rome	Horse		July 4, 1887 July 1, 1902	1900 1903	
	Rome	Compressed-air		September 22, 1900	June 30, 1902	System returned to horse-drawn after 1902 until electric.
	Rome	Electric		June 9, 1903	December 7, 1930	
	Saratoga Springs	Electric		June 30, 1892	January 20, 1926	Brief periods of operation in 1890 and 1891.
Schenectady Railway Co.	♦ Schenectady	Horse		?	?	
Schenectady Railway Co.	♦ Schenectady	Electric		?	1946	
Nassau County Railway	♦ Sea Cliff	Electric		July 2, 1902	December 31, 1924	a.k.a.; Sea Cliff Village Trolley
Glen Cove Railroad	♦♦ Sea Cliff – Glen Cove	Electric		November 16, 1905	November 15, 1924	
	♦ Staten Island	Horse		September 1868	1896	
	♦ Staten Island	Electric		1893	January 26, 1934	
South Shore Traction Company	♦ Sayville – Blue Point	Horse		1903	1909	
South Shore Traction Company	♦ Sayville – Blue Point	Accumulator (storage battery)		1909	January 1913	Acquired by Suffolk Traction Company
Suffolk Traction Company	♦ Sayville – Blue Point	Accumulator (storage battery)		Jan 1913	October 10, 1919	
	Syracuse	Horse		August 15, 1860	August 19, 1900	
	Syracuse	Electric		November 29, 1888	January 4, 1941	
	♦ Syracuse – Edwards Falls	Electric		June 16, 1898	October 24, 1931	
	♦ Troy	Horse		September 1861	?	
	♦ Troy	Electric		?	September 26, 1933	
	Utica	Horse		September 14, 1863	?	
	Utica	Electric		1890	May 13, 1941	
	Watertown	Electric		May 20, 1891	August 17, 1937	
Watertown & Carthage Traction Co. (1891–1901); Black River Traction Co. (1901–1931)	♦ Watertown – Brownsville – Dexter	Electric		June 30, 1891	March 9, 1931	
	Waverly	Electric		June 30, 1896	June 11, 1930	
	♦ Waverly – Sayre, PA – Athens, PA	Electric		June 30, 1896	June 11, 1930	
	Westchester County					See also the entries for New York City.
	♦ White Plains	Electric		October 1, 1895	November 16, 1929	
Yonkers Railroad Company	♦ Yonkers	Horse		March 1887	1892	
Yonkers Railroad Company	♦ Yonkers	Electric		May 1892	November 1952	

- Note for Cortland – Homer – McGraw – Preble: Horse tramway connected Cortland and Homer. Electric tramway, opened April 1, 1895, connected Cortland, Homer and McGraw. Extended to Preble in 1907. McGraw Preble segment closed April 1, 1929. Remainder closed February 15, 1931.
- Note for Newburgh – Orange Lake – Walden: Opened in stages, to Orange Lake in July 1894, completed June 1, 1895. Newburgh – Orange Lake operated during summer season, 1924 and 1925, petrol (gasoline) traction (?).
- Note for New York – City Island: Experimental monorail operated Bartow railway station – north end of City Island bridge, July 15–19, 1910, and November 14, 1910 – March 16, 1914.
- Note for New York – Rockaway Park: Tramcars operated over electrified Long Island Rail Road tracks between Far Rockaway and Hammels, 1905 – September 9, 1926, using overhead current collection to 1912 and third-rail current collection thereafter.

== North Carolina ==
Name	Location	Motive power	Type	Opened	Closed	Notes
	Asheville	Horse		?	?	
	Asheville	Electric		February 1, 1889	1934	
	Belmont	Electric		?	?	
	Burlington	Electric		1912	1922	Connected Burlington and Haw River.
	Charlotte (first era)	Horse		January 1, 1887	?	
	Charlotte (first era)	Accumulator (storage battery)		?	?	
	Charlotte (first era)	Electric		May 18, 1891	March 14, 1938	
Charlotte Trolley	**Charlotte** (second era)	Electric		August 30, 1996	June 28, 2010	Heritage streetcar service opened in 1996, though with only limited days and hours, but ended in 2010.
Lynx Blue Line	**Charlotte** (second era)	Electric	Light rail	November 24, 2007		An additional Lynx Silver Line is planned to open in 2037.
CityLynx Gold Line	**Charlotte** (second era)	Electric		July 14, 2015		Operated using Siemens S700 modern streetcars since 2021. Formerly used heritage streetcars previously used on the Charlotte Trolley.
	Concord	Horse		?		
	Concord	Steam		c. 1889	?	
	Concord	Accumulator (storage battery)		1911	?	
	Concord	Electric		1923	c. 1929	
	Durham	Horse		?	?	
	Durham	Electric		1902	1934	
	Fayetteville	Horse		?	?	
	Fayetteville	Steam		c. 1908	1909	
	Fayetteville	Petrol (gasoline)		?	?	
	Fayetteville	Electric		?	?	
	Gastonia	Electric		?	September 21, 1948	
	Goldsboro	Electric		1910 1915	1912 c. 1920	
	Greensboro	Horse		?	?	
	Greensboro	Electric		June 11, 1902	1934	
	Hendersonville	Horse		?	?	
	Hendersonville	Steam		?	?	
	Hendersonville	Petrol (gasoline)		?	?	
	Hendersonville	Electric		1911	c. 1920	
	High Point	Accumulator (storage battery)		c. 1906	?	
	High Point	Electric		1912	1935	
	New Bern	Accumulator (storage battery)		1913	?	
	New Bern	Electric		c. 1913	1929	
	Pinehurst	Electric		1896	1907	
	Raleigh	Horse		December 25, 1886	?	
	Raleigh	Electric		September 1, 1891	1934	
	Salisbury	Electric		1905	1938	
	Wilmington	Horse		July 17, 1888	?	
	Wilmington	Electric		1892	April 18, 1939	
	♦ Wilmington – Wrightsville Beach	Steam		?	?	
	♦ Wilmington – Wrightsville Beach	Electric		c. 1900	1939	
	Winston-Salem	Electric		July 14, 1890	1936	

== North Dakota ==
Name	Location	Motive power	Type	Opened	Closed	Notes
	Bismarck	Electric		February 16, 1904	February 28, 1931	Only US town tramway owned by a (federal) state authority.
	Fargo	Horse		1879 July 7, 1882	1879 September 18, 1882	
	Fargo	Electric		February 16, 1904	August 21, 1937	Tramway system also served Moorhead, MN.
	Grand Forks	Electric		November 20, 1904	February 1, 1934	System included an interstate line to East Grand Forks, Minnesota.
Valley City Street & Interurban Railway	Valley City	Electric		December 18, 1905	c. 1940s	
	Wahpeton					See Breckenridge, MN.

== Ohio ==
Name	Location	Motive power	Type	Opened	Closed	Notes
Akron Street Railway Company	Akron	Horse		August 18, 1883	[data missing]	
Akron Street Railway Company	Akron	Electric		November 3, 1888	March 26, 1947	
Ashtabula City Railway Company	Ashtabula	Horse		July 3, 1883	[data missing]	
	Ashtabula	Electric		April 9, 1892	January 30, 1939	
Stark Electric Railroad Company	Alliance	Electric				
	Bellefontaine	Electric				Two routes that operated as part of the larger interurban system
Bellaire Street Railroad Company	Bellaire	Horse		October 16, 1865	[data missing]	
Berea Street Railroad Company	Berea	Horse		May 3, 1876	[data missing]	
	Cambridge	Electric		c. 1900	1929	
Canton Street Railway Company	Canton	Horse		1884	[data missing]	
	Canton	Electric		March 1890	April 18, 1931	
Chillicothe Street Railroad Company	Chillicothe	Horse		[data missing]	[data missing]	
	Chillicothe	Electric		c. 1890s	1930	
Cincinnati Street Railway	Cincinnati (first era)	Horse		1859	1904	
Cincinnati Street Railway	Cincinnati (first era)	Cable		July 8, 1885	July 19, 1902	
Cincinnati Street Railway	Cincinnati (first era)	Steam		1866	1897	Mt. Lookout dummy.
Cincinnati Street Railway	Cincinnati (first era)	Electric		1889	April 29, 1951	See Streetcars in Cincinnati, and in this list see also Covington, Kentucky.
Connector	**Cincinnati** (second era)	Electric		September 9, 2016		
	**Cleveland**	Horse		September 4, 1860	1901	
	**Cleveland**	Cable		December 18, 1890	January 20, 1901	
	**Cleveland**	Electric	Streetcar	July 26, 1884 1888	1885 January 24, 1954	See Streetcars in Cleveland
	**Cleveland**	Electric	Interurban (Light rail)	October 26, 1895		Last in-street trolley/tram lines closed in 1954, but Shaker light rail lines survived (see **Blue, Green, and Waterfront Lines**).
	Columbus	Horse		1863	1892	
	Columbus	Electric		1891	September 5, 1948	
	Conneaut	Electric		[data missing]	[data missing]	
	Dayton	Horse		May 1, 1870	September 15, 1896	
	Dayton	Accumulator (storage battery)		May 1893	[data missing]	
	Dayton	Steam		1872	1886	
	Dayton	Electric		1888	September 28, 1947	See Note.
	Defiance	Electric		December 12, 1891	1913	
	Delaware	Electric		c. 1890s	August 19, 1926	
	East Liverpool	Electric		1892	April 1939	
	Elyria	Electric		c. 1890s	1931	
Findlay Street Railway Company	Findlay	Horse		1887	1894	
	Findlay	Electric		1891	January 31, 1932	
	Fremont	Electric		c. 1900	1932	
	Gallipolis	Electric		c. 1890s	1932	
Hamilton Street Railway	Hamilton	Horse		[data missing]	[data missing]	
	Hamilton	Electric		1890	1933	
The Ironton and Petersburg Street Railway Company	Ironton	Horse		[data missing]	[data missing]	
Ohio Valley Electric Railway	Ironton	Electric		[data missing]	1930	
	Lancaster	Electric		c. 1890s	October 30, 1937	
	Lima	Horse		1878	[data missing]	
Lima Street Railway, Motor and Power Company	Lima	Electric		July 14, 1887	May 13, 1939	
	Lorain	Electric		c. 1890s	May 7, 1938	
Mansfield Electric Street Railway Company	Mansfield	Electric		August 7, 1887	June 6, 1937	
	Marietta	Horse		1888	[data missing]	
	Marietta	Electric		1896	1934	
	Marion	Electric		c. 1890s	1933	
	Massillon	Electric		1892	June 2, 1929	
Middletown and Madison Street Railroad Company	Middletown	Horse		1879	May 4, 1918	Replaced by motorbus.
	Mount Vernon	Electric		c. 1890s	1917	
	New Philadelphia – Dover	Electric		July 4, 1889	January 26, 1926	
	Newark	Horse		[data missing]	[data missing]	
	Newark	Electric		December 28, 1880	August 10, 1926	
	Niles	Electric		1894	1927	
	Norwalk	Electric		[data missing]	May 14, 1938	
	Painesville	Electric		1893	1926	
	Piqua	Electric		September 1, 1893	[data missing]	
	Pomeroy	Electric		November 1900	1929	
	Portsmouth	Electric		c. 1890s	1939	
	Salem	Electric		May 23, 1890	December 9, 1911	
	Sandusky	Horse		August 1, 1883	[data missing]	
	Sandusky	Electric		November 27, 1890	May 25, 1938	
Citizens' Street Railroad Company	Springfield	Horse		[data missing]	[data missing]	
	Springfield	Electric		1891	December 9, 1932	Town tramway service on interurban line, Dec 1929 – 3 Jun 1938.
Steubenville Electric Railway Company	Steubenville	Electric		December 12, 1888	December 1938	
	Tiffin	Electric		July 4, 1888	1919	
	Toledo	Horse		1860	1890	
	Toledo	Electric		1890	December 31, 1949	
	Uhrichsville – Dennison	Electric		1901	January 1922	
	Warren	Electric		1894	1931	
	Youngstown	Horse		1873	[data missing]	
	Youngstown	Electric		[data missing]	December 8, 1940	See also Sharon, Pennsylvania.
	Zanesville	Horse		November 13, 1875	[data missing]	
	Zanesville	Electric		December 27, 1890	December 31, 1930	

- Note for Dayton: Town streetcar services were provided by a single undertaking in most U.S. towns. Such undertakings were often organized by consolidation ("unification") of predecessor undertakings. In most cases, such consolidations were completed before the First World War. Dayton was a notable exception. In this town, five undertakings operated town streetcar services from 1909 to 1933. Conversions to trolleybus began in 1933; remarkably, all five undertakings operated trolleybuses for several months in 1940, before the beginning of consolidations. See Trolleybuses in Dayton for further information.

== Oklahoma ==
Name	Location	Motive power	Type	Opened	Closed	Notes
Ardmore Traction Co.	Ardmore	Electric		January 1906	1922	
Bartlesville Interurban Co.	Bartlesville ― Dewey	Electric	Interurban	July 14, 1908	July 15, 1920	
Chickasha Street Railway	Chickasha	Electric		July 12, 1910	August 14, 1927	
Clinton Street Railway	Clinton	Petrol (gasoline)		June 1909	1911	
Clinton Street Railway	Clinton	Electric		1912	August 27, 1914	
	El Reno	Petrol (gasoline)		?	1908	
El Reno Interurban Railway	El Reno	Electric		1908	1911	Acquired by the Oklahoma Railway Co. in 1911 and consolidated into its interurban network.
El Reno Heritage Express	El Reno	Propane		August 25, 2001		**Heritage streetcar**
Enid City Railway	Enid	Electric		June 3, 1907	August 31, 1929	
Guthrie Railway Co.	Guthrie	Electric		May 26, 1905	July 19, 1916	Acquired by the Oklahoma Railway Co. in 1916 and consolidated into its interurban network.
Lawton Railway & Light Co.	Lawton ― Fort Sill	Electric	Interurban	July 11, 1914	November 11, 1927	
Pittsburg County Railway	McAlester	Electric		September 15, 1903	1932	
Pittsburg County Railway	McAlester ― Hartshorne	Electric	Interurban	November 14, 1904	April 27, 1947	
Northeast Oklahoma Railroad	Miami ― Commerce ― Cardin ― Picher ― Columbus (Kan.)	Electric	Interurban	December 20, 1920	December 1939	
Muskogee Electric Traction Company	Muskogee	Electric		May 15, 1905	March 9, 1933	
Muskogee Electric Traction Company	Muskogee ― Fort Gibson	Electric	Interurban	1911	March 9, 1933	
Union Electric Railway	Nowata ― Coffeyville (Kan.)	Electric	Interurban	1915	July 17, 1947	
Oklahoma Railway Company	Oklahoma City (first era)	Electric		February 7, 1903	April 13, 1947	
Oklahoma Railway Company	Oklahoma City ― El Reno	Electric	Interurban	December 3, 1911	November 9, 1946	
Oklahoma Railway Company	Oklahoma City ― Guthrie	Electric	Interurban	July 20, 1916	November 9, 1946	
Oklahoma Railway Company	Oklahoma City ― Norman	Electric	Interurban	November 1913	September 27, 1947	
Oklahoma City Streetcar	**Oklahoma City** (second era)	Electric		December 14, 2018		**Reintroduction**; see Oklahoma City Streetcar.
Okmulgee Inter-Urban Railway	Okmulgee	Electric		November 20, 1911	1919	
Tulsa-Sapulpa Union Railway	Sapulpa	Electric		December 22, 1909	1933	
Shawnee-Tecumseh Traction Co.	Shawnee ― Tecumseh	Electric	Interurban	September 1, 1906	January 9, 1927	
Tulsa Street Railway	♦ Tulsa	Horse		May 27, 1907	July 1907	
Tulsa Street Railway	♦ Tulsa	Electric		July 1907	February 5, 1936	
Sand Springs Railway	♦ Tulsa ― Sand Springs	Electric	Interurban	1911	January 2, 1955	
Tulsa-Sapulpa Union Railway	♦ Tulsa ― Sapulpa	Electric	Interurban	October 1918	1933	

== Oregon ==
Name	Location	Motive power	Type	Opened	Closed	Notes
	Albany	Steam		c. 1889	?	May have started as late as 1892.
	Albany	Horse		August 30, 1889	1909	
	Albany	Electric		1909	1918	
	Astoria	Horse		May 9, 1888	1892	
	Astoria	Electric		1892	June 1924	Seasonal heritage streetcar line, the Astoria Riverfront Trolley, started 1999.
	Baker	Horse		June 4, 1890	?	
	Corvallis	Horse		June 19, 1890	c. 1898–99	
Eugene Street Railway	Eugene	Horse		June 26, 1891	1903	Mule-drawn.
Eugene Street Railway	Eugene	Electric		September 26, 1907	October 15, 1927	Renamed "Portland, Eugene and Eastern" 1907-1915
	Forest Grove	Electric		c. 1906	1911	
	Klamath Falls	Horse		July 4, 1907	May 1911	
	Medford	Electric		1914	1920	First streetcar was delivered on 16 March 1914.
	Portland (first era)	Horse		c. December 1872	1896	First test run on 7 Dec 1872.
	Portland (first era)	Cable		February 22, 1890	Aug 1904	
	Portland (first era)	Electric		November 1, 1889	February 26, 1950	
	♦ Portland – Oregon City, Portland – Bellrose	Electric	Interurban	February 16, 1893	January 25, 1958	Opening date is for Oregon City line; closure date is same for both.
	♦ Portland – Vancouver, Washington	Electric		1917	1940	
MAX Light Rail	**Portland** (second era)	Electric	Light rail	September 5, 1986		Reintroduction, as MAX Light Rail.
Portland Streetcar	**Portland** (second era)	Electric		July 20, 2001		Modern-streetcar system.
	Salem	Horse		January 15, 1889	?	
	Salem	Electric		May 27, 1890	August 4, 1927	
	Union	Steam		1895	?	

== Pennsylvania ==
Name	Location	Motive power	Type	Opened	Closed	Notes
Gettysburg Electric Railway	Adams County	Electric		July 1893	June 1917	
	Aliquippa	Electric		c. 1910s	1937	See also Beaver Falls.
	Allentown	Horse		May 21, 1868	April 17, 1891	Lehigh Valley Transit Co.
	Allentown	Electric		July 1, 1891	June 18, 1953	
Altoona and Logan Valley Electric Railway	Altoona	Horse		July 4, 1882	?	
Altoona and Logan Valley Electric Railway	Altoona	Electric		?	August 7, 1954	
	Bangor	Electric		c. 1900	1933	
	♦ Bethlehem	Electric		?	June 18, 1953	
	Beaver Falls – New Brighton	Horse		c. 1880s	?	
	Beaver Falls – New Brighton	Electric		?	1937	See also Aliquippa.
	Berwick	Electric		c. 1910s	1924	
	Bloomsburg	Electric		c. 1900	1926	
	Bradford	Horse		c. 1880s	?	
	Bradford	Electric		?	1927	
	Butler	Electric		c. 1900	1941	
Scranton Railway Company	Carbondale	Electric		?	?	
	Carlisle	Electric		c. 1900	1938	
	Chambersburg	Electric		c. 1900s	1928	
	♦ Charleroi	Electric		?	1953	
	♦ Chester	Horse		February 1, 1883	April 1, 1893	
	♦ Chester	Electric		December 10, 1892	1934	
	♦ Clairton	Electric		?	?	
West Penn Railways, Coke Division:	♦ Connellsville	Electric		1891	1952	
	Corry	Electric		1906	August 27, 1923	
	Danville	Electric		c. 1900	1924	
	♦ Donora	Electric		December 15, 1901	May 5, 1953	
	DuBois	Electric		c. 1890s	1926	See also Punxsutawney.
	Easton	Horse		June 20, 1889	December 10, 1892	
	Easton	Electric		1892	November 5, 1939	See also Phillipsburg, New Jersey.
	Erie	Horse		1867	?	
	Erie	Electric		June 25, 1889	May 11, 1935	
Springs Horse Railroad	Gettysburg	Horse				
	Greensburg	Electric		1889	January 3, 1937	Interurban (West Penn Railways, Coke Division) service continued to 1952.
	Hanover	Electric		1893	1931	See also York.
	Harrisburg	Horse		July 4, 1865	1892	
	Harrisburg	Electric		July 17, 1889	July 16, 1939	
	Hazleton	Electric		c. 1890s	1932	
	Hershey	Electric		October 15, 1904	December 21, 1946	
	Huntingdon	Electric		?	July 20, 1926	
	Indiana	Electric		c. 1900	1934	
	Jersey Shore	Electric		1903	?	
	Jim Thorpe	Electric		?	1931	
Mauch Chunk Switchback Railway	Jim Thorpe (formerly Mauch Chunk)	Gravity				
Johnstown Traction Company	Johnstown	Horse		1882	?	
Johnstown Traction Company	Johnstown	Electric		1891	June 11, 1960	
	Kittanning – Ford City	Electric		August 1899	November 8, 1936	
Conestoga Traction Company	Lancaster	Horse		November 1874	?	
Conestoga Traction Company	Lancaster	Electric		1890	September 20, 1947	
	♦ Latrobe	Electric		1900	1952	
	Lebanon	Electric		1891	July 21, 1930	
	Leechburg – Apollo	Electric		March 23, 1906	March 17, 1936	
	Lewisburg	Electric		?	?	
	Lewistown	Electric		c. 1900	?	
	Lock Haven	Electric		?	?	
	♦ McKeesport	Horse				
	♦ McKeesport	Electric		April 1, 1891	June 3, 1938	
	Meadville	Electric		c. 1890s	1928	
	Milton	Electric		c. 1890s	1928	
	Mount Carmel	Electric		c. 1890s	1936	
	New Castle	Electric		1889	1940	
	New Kensington	Electric		1906	May 22, 1937	See also Pittsburgh.
	♦ Norristown	Horse		April 11, 1885	1893	Philadelphia and Western, Lehigh Valley Transit interurban.
	♦ Norristown	Electric		July 21, 1893	September 9, 1933	
	Oakdale – McDonald	Electric		1907	October 15, 1927	See also Pittsburgh.
	Oil City – Franklin	Electric		c. 1890s	June 16, 1928	
	**Philadelphia**	Horse		January 20, 1858	January 14, 1897	
Philadelphia Traction Company	**Philadelphia**	Cable		April 7, 1883	June 20, 1895	
	**Philadelphia**	Electric		December 15, 1892	1992	Last non Subway–Surface Trolley lines, Routes 23 and 56, closed in 1992. See also: Camden, New Jersey.
SEPTA Subway–Surface Trolley Lines	**Philadelphia**	Electric		1906		See SEPTA.
Media–Sharon Hill Line	**Philadelphia**	Electric	Light rail	March 15, 1906		See SEPTA.
SEPTA Route 15	**Philadelphia**	Electric		1859 2005	1992	Originally opened as a horsecar line in 1859; electrified in 1895; line extensions in 1902–1903. Closed and replaced by buses in 1992. **Reopened** as a **heritage streetcar** line in 2005.
	♦♦ Philadelphia (Upper Darby) – West Chester	Horse		December 24, 1858	1892	
	♦♦ Philadelphia (Upper Darby) – West Chester	Electric		1892	1954	(Now mostly part of SEPTA.)
	**Pittsburgh**	Horse		1859	1924	
	**Pittsburgh**	Cable		September 1888	June 14, 1891	
	**Pittsburgh**	Electric	converted to Light rail	1888 (1984)		See: **Pittsburgh Railways**. Also served many neighboring towns. Converted to and opened as **Pittsburgh Light Rail** starting on 15 Apr 1984; first downtown subway opened 3 Jul 1985; further modernizations in 1987; modernized Overbrook Line opened in 2004; subway extension to North Shore opened in 2012. Light-rail transit (LRT) system incorporates many segments built previously.
Pittsburgh Railways; Interurban Division	♦♦ Pittsburgh – Charleroi	Electric		?	1953	
	♦♦ Pittsburgh – McKeesport	Electric		?	1963	
Pittsburgh Railways; Interurban Division	♦♦ Pittsburgh – Washington	Electric		?	August 29, 1953	
	♦ Port Vue	Electric		?	1919	
	Pottstown	Electric		c. 1890s	1937	
	Pottsville	Horse		1872	?	
	Pottsville	Electric		1890	1932	
	Punxsutawney	Electric		c. 1890s	1926	See also Du Bois.
	Reading	Horse		1874	?	
	Reading	Electric		November 26, 1888	January 17, 1952	
Allenport & Roscoe Street Railway	Roscoe	Electric		1903	1906	Bought by Pittsburgh Railways
	Sayre	Electric		c. 1900	1930	
	♦ Scottdale	Electric		1891	1952	
	Scranton	Horse		July 4, 1867	?	
Scranton Transit Company	Scranton	Electric		November 30, 1886	December 18, 1954	Scranton Transit Company was known as Scranton Railway Company until 1934
Lackawanna and Wyoming Valley Railroad	Scranton - Wilkes-Barre	Electric				
	Shamokin	Electric		c. 1890s	1929	
	Sharon	Electric		1890	1939	See also: Youngstown, Ohio.
	Shenandoah	Electric		?	?	
	Stroudsburg	Horse		1870	?	
	Stroudsburg	Electric		?	1928	
	Sunbury	Horse		1885	1890	
	Sunbury	Electric		1885 May 30, 1890	1885 March 11, 1939	
	Titusville	Electric		c. 1890s	1924	
	♦ Uniontown	Electric		1890	1952	
Washington and Canonsburg Railway Co.	♦ Washington	Electric		1903	1909	Bought by Pittsburgh Railways.
	Warren	Electric		c. 1900	1929	
	Waynesboro	Electric		?	?	
	♦ West Chester	Electric		c. 1890s	1927	
	Wilkes-Barre	Horse		June 25, 1866	January 30, 1892	
	Wilkes-Barre	Electric		March 1888	October 14, 1950	See also Scranton.
	Williamsport	Electric		c. 1890s	1933	
	York	Horse		September 30, 1886		
	York	Electric		1892	February 1939	See also Hanover.

== Rhode Island ==
Name	Location	Motive power	Type	Opened	Closed	Notes
	Block Island	Horse		?	c. 1898	
Newport Street Railway (1889–1900); Newport & Fall River Street Railway (1900–1920); Newport Electric Corp. (1920–1929)	Newport	Electric		August 7, 1889	1925/1929	In 1925, the Fall River to Newport trolley line was replaced by a bus service. However the Bristol Ferry-Newport Electric Railway would run until 1929, when the Mount Hope Bridge was built.
Pawtucket Street Railway (1864–1894); Pawtucket Street Railway (Union Traction & Electric Co.) (1894–1902); Pawtucket Street Railway (Rhode Island Co.) (1902–1921); United Electric Railways Co. (1921–1940)	♦ Pawtucket	Horse		May 26, 1864	?	
Pawtucket Street Railway (1864–1894); Pawtucket Street Railway (Union Traction & Electric Co.) (1894–1902); Pawtucket Street Railway (Rhode Island Co.) (1902–1921); United Electric Railways Co. (1921–1940)	♦ Pawtucket	Electric		January 20, 1892	May 11, 1934	Service continued between Providence and Pawtucket to 26 Jun 1940.
Union Railroad of Providence (1864–1894); Union Railroad of Providence (Union Traction & Electric Co.) (1894–1902); Union Railroad of Providence (Rhode Island Co.) (1902–1921); United Electric Railways Co. (1921–1948)	Providence	Horse		January 1865	April 26, 1894	
Union Railroad of Providence (1864–1894); Union Railroad of Providence (Union Traction & Electric Co.) (1894–1902); Union Railroad of Providence (Rhode Island Co.) (1902–1921); United Electric Railways Co. (1921–1948)	Providence	Cable		January 1, 1890	January 26, 1895	
Union Railroad of Providence (1864–1894); Union Railroad of Providence (Union Traction & Electric Co.) (1894–1902); Union Railroad of Providence (Rhode Island Co.) (1902–1921); United Electric Railways Co. (1921–1948)	Providence	Electric		January 20, 1892	May 14, 1948	
Norwich, Mystic & Westerly Street Railway Company (1903–1905, pre-construction); Norwich and Westerly Railway (1905–1922)	Westerly	Electric		1906	December 31, 1922	The company was first chartered as the Norwich, Mystic & Westerly Street Railway Company on May 11, 1903, before being renamed to the Norwich and Westerly Railway in December 1905. It would open in 1906. The Norwich and Westerly Railway would be acquired by the Shore Line Electric Railway in 1916. It continued operations until December 31, 1922.
Woonsocket Street Railway (1887–1907); Woonsocket Street Railway (Rhode Island Co.) (1907–1921); United Electric Railways Co. (1921–1928)	Woonsocket	Horse		August 2, 1887	?	
Woonsocket Street Railway (1887–1907); Woonsocket Street Railway (Rhode Island Co.) (1907–1921); United Electric Railways Co. (1921–1928)	Woonsocket	Electric		September 25, 1888	December 1928	

== South Carolina ==
Name	Location	Motive power	Type	Opened	Closed	Notes
	Anderson	Electric		February 19, 1905	November 14, 1934	
	Charleston	Horse		October 15, 1866	1897	
	Charleston	Electric		June 26, 1897	February 10, 1938	
	Columbia	Horse		October 12, 1886	1893	
	Columbia	Electric		May 3, 1893	March 11, 1927	Limited service, resumed because of court order, 9 Jan 1931 – 22 Nov 1936.
	Gaffney	Steam		1892	1896	
	Greenville	Horse		1875	1897	
	Greenville	Electric		1900	October 1937	
Piedmont and Northern Railway	Greenwood – Spartanburg	Electric	Interurban	1914	1954	Ran from Greenwood to Spartanburg via Belton, Greenville and Greer. (Also a Belton – Anderson spur.)
Orangeburg City Street Railway	Orangeburg	Horse		1889	?	
	Rock Hill	Accumulator (storage battery)		February 24, 1912	1918	
	Spartanburg	Horse		?	?	
	Spartanburg	Electric		1900	April 27, 1935	Service suspended 30 Dec 1922. Limited service restored (only one car in operation), 13 Jan 1923 – 21 Jul 1923. Full service resumed 1925.

== South Dakota ==
Name	Location	Motive power	Type	Opened	Closed	Notes
	Aberdeen	Electric		November 1910	1922	
	Deadwood	Horse		?	?	
	Hot Springs	Electric		?	?	
	Pierre	Horse		April 1885	?	
	Rapid City	Horse		?	?	
Sioux Falls Street Railroad	Sioux Falls	Horse		February 23, 1889	1897	
Sioux Falls Traction System	Sioux Falls	Electric		October 5, 1907	August 28, 1929	
South Dakota Rapid Transit	♦ Sioux Falls ― East Sioux Falls	Electric		June 13, 1890	1898	
Sioux Falls Terminal Railroad	♦ Sioux Falls — South Sioux Falls	Steam		June 18, 1889	1900	
	Watertown	Horse		?	?	

== Tennessee ==
Name	Location	Motive power	Type	Opened	Closed	Notes
	Athens	Horse		?	?	
	Bristol	Horse		?	?	
	Bristol	Electric		?	?	
	Chattanooga	Horse		c. 1875	1891	
	Chattanooga	Electric		July 1889	April 10, 1947	
	Clarksville	Horse		1888	1896	
	Clarksville	Electric		1896	July 16, 1928	
	Cleveland	Horse		?	?	
	Columbia	Horse		?	?	
	Jackson	Horse		c. 1880s	?	
	Jackson	Electric		?	1939	
	Johnson City	Electric		c. 1890s	1931	
	Knoxville	Horse		April 14, 1876	1894	
	Knoxville	Electric		May 1, 1890	August 1, 1947	
	Memphis (first era)	Horse		May 1866	?	
	Memphis (first era)	Electric		September 22, 1891	June 14, 1947	
MATA Trolley	**Memphis** (second era)	Electric		April 29, 1993		Main Street Trolley **heritage streetcar** system opened in 1993; expansions in 1997 and 2004. Rebuilt system reopened in 2018.
	Nashville	Horse		March 31, 1866	?	
	Nashville	Electric		April 1889	February 2, 1941	

== Texas ==
Name	Location	Motive power	Type	Opened	Closed	Notes
	Abilene	Electric		November 1908	June 14, 1931	
	Amarillo	Electric		?	1940	
	Aransas Pass	Mule		?	?	
Austin City Railroad Company	Austin	Mule		1875	1891	
	Austin	Electric		1891	1940	
	Beaumont	Electric		c. 1900	1937	
	Bonham	Electric		?	?	
	Brownsville	Petrol (gasoline)		?	?	Connected Brownsville and San Benito
	Brownsville	Electric		1915	1926	
	Cleburne	Electric		?	1917	
	Corpus Christi	Mule		c. 1890s	c. 1900	
	Corpus Christi	Steam		c. 1890s	?	
	Corpus Christi	Electric		March 28, 1910	1934	
	Corsicana	Electric		1902	September 30, 1931	
Dallas Consolidated Railway Company	Dallas (first era)	Mule		c. 1870s	?	
	Dallas (first era)	Cable		?	?	Construction started, not completed.
	Dallas (first era)	Electric		1890	January 15, 1956	
M-Line Trolley	**Dallas** (second era)	Electric		July 22, 1989		Reintroduction, as a **heritage streetcar** line providing regular transit service.
DART rail	**Dallas** (second era)	Electric	Light rail	June 14, 1996		
Dallas Streetcar	**Dallas** (second era)	Electric		April 13, 2015		
Denison Street Railway Company	Denison	Mule		c. 1880s	?	
	Denison	Steam		November 22, 1889	?	
	Denison	Electric		?	1931	
	Denton	Electric		?	1918	
	Dublin	Mule		?	?	
El Paso Street Railway Company	El Paso (first era)	Horse		October 1882	1902	
	El Paso (first era)	Electric		January 11, 1902	1947	International tramway (see below) continued in operation until 1973.
International tramway	El Paso – Ciudad Juárez, Chih., México	Mule		October 1882	1902	
International tramway	El Paso – Ciudad Juárez, Chih., México	Electric		January 11, 1902	July 30, 1973	Operation suspended Aug 1966 – Nov 1967, and Jul 1969 – Nov 1970 because of bridge reconstruction. Operation restored following closure, in El Paso only, 14 Nov 1973 – 4 May 1974.
El Paso Streetcar	**El Paso** (second era)	Electric		November 9, 2018		**Reintroduction**
	Fort Worth	Mule		c. 1870s	?	
	Fort Worth	Electric		?	1939	
Gainesville Street Railway Company	Gainesville	Mule		?	?	
	Galveston (first era)	Mule		1867	?	
	Galveston (first era)	Electric		1891	May 1938	
Galveston Island Trolley	**Galveston** (second era)	Diesel-electric		July 23, 1988		Heritage streetcar. Service suspended in 2008 due to damage from Hurricane Ike and reopened on October 1, 2021, limited to three days a week for now.
Galveston–Houston Electric Railway	♦ Galveston - Houston	Electric		1911	1936	
	Greenville	Mule		?	?	
	Greenville	Electric		?	December 14, 1918	
	Haskell	Petrol (gasoline)		?	?	Connected Haskell and Hemphill Lake.
	Hillsboro	Mule		?	1898	
	Hillsboro	Electric		?	?	
Houston City Street Railway Company	Houston (first era)	Mule		January 25, 1868	?	
	Houston (first era)	Electric		June 14, 1891	June 8, 1940	
METRORail	**Houston** (second era)	Electric	Light rail	January 1, 2004		
Lampasas Springs Street Railroad Company	Lampasas	Mule		?	?	
International Bridge and Tramway Company	Laredo	Mule				
	Laredo	Electric		January 27, 1890	1934	First electric town streetcar line in Texas. Also operated international tramway line to Nuevo Laredo, México.
	Lockhart	Mule		?	?	
	Lubbock	Electric		c. 1900s	c. 1920s	Operation began in 1908, ceased in the 1920s due to the rise of automobiles, bus service replaced the streetcar system eventually.
	Longview	Mule		?	?	
	Longview	Electric		c. 1880s	1925	
	Marshall	Horse		December 1, 1887		
	Marshall	Electric		c. 1880s	1925	
	Matador	Petrol (gasoline)		1914	1936	Connected Matador and Motley Junction
	McKinney	Electric		?	1926	
	Mineral Wells	Petrol (gasoline)		?	?	
	Mineral Wells	Electric		1908	1920	System included line connecting Mineral Wells and Elmhurst Park.
	Moscow	Mule		c. 1846	?	The opening year of 1846, which appears in a list of Texas town streetcar systems published by the Texas Division, Electric Railroaders Association, is believed unlikely.
	Mount Pleasant	Mule		?	?	
	Palestine	Mule		1875	1877	
Paris Railway Company	Paris	Mule		September 1, 1878	?	
	Paris	Electric		?	1926	
	Port Arthur	Petrol (gasoline)		?	?	
	Port Arthur	Electric		?	1938	
	Rockport	Mule		?	?	
	Rusk	Mule		?	?	Connected Rusk and New Birmingham. New Birmingham was located 2 mi (3 km) south of Rusk.
	San Angelo	Electric		1908	?	
	San Antonio	Mule		June 27, 1878	?	
	San Antonio	Petrol (gasoline)		?	?	
	San Antonio	Electric		1890	April 29, 1933	First large U.S. town to replace all electric town streetcar services with motorbuses.
	Seguin	Mule		?	?	
Sherman City Railroad Company	Sherman	Mule		1877	1901	
	Sherman	Electric		?	July 22, 1931	
	Taylor	Mule		1891	1899	
	Taylor	Electric		?	?	
	Temple	Electric		c. 1900	1923	
	Texas City	Petrol (gasoline)		?	?	
	Tyler	Electric		c. 1890s	?	
	Uvalde	Steam		?	?	
	Uvalde	Petrol (gasoline)		?	?	
	Vernon	Mule		?	?	
Victoria Street Railway and Improvement Company	Victoria	Mule		November 28, 1888	1894	
Waco Street Railway Comoany	Waco	Mule		May 1, 1877	?	
	Waco	Steam		?	?	
	Waco	Electric		?	February 3, 1937	
	Waxahachie	Mule		December 17, 1889	1912	
	Waxahachie	Electric		1912	February 1928	
	Weatherford	Mule		?	?	
	Wichita Falls	Electric		1909	1934	System included line connecting Wichita Falls and Lake Wichita.
	Yubadam	Mule		?	?	Located near Tyler.

- Note: Peschkes states that, although listed in some statistics, streetcar systems were not built in the following towns:
  - Brenham
  - Colorado City
  - Henrietta – Seymour
  - Marlin – Wootan Wells
  - Sulphur Springs

== Utah ==
Name	Location	Motive power	Type	Opened	Closed	Notes
	Brigham City	Electric		1907	1919	
	Logan	Electric		1910	1926	
	Ogden	Horse		c. 1880s	?	
	Ogden	Electric		?	December 26, 1935	
	Provo	Electric		October 1913	1919	
	Salt Lake City (first era)	Horse		c. 1870s	?	
	Salt Lake City (first era)	Electric		? 1941	1941 1945	
TRAX	**Salt Lake City** (second era)	Electric	Light rail	December 4, 1999		Reintroduction, as UTA's TRAX.
S Line (Utah Transit Authority)	**Salt Lake City** (second era)	Electric		December 7, 2013		Modern streetcar system, the S Line (Utah Transit Authority) (originally known as the Sugar House Streetcar project).

== Vermont ==
Name	Location	Motive power	Type	Opened	Closed	Notes
Barre & Montpelier Traction Company (1890s-1925); Vergennes Power Co. (1925–1927)	Barre-Montpelier	Electric		c. 1890s	1927	Connected Barre and Montpelier.
Bennington & Hoosick Valley Railway (1897–1907); Bennington & North Adams Street Railway (1907–1910); Berkshire Street Railway (1910–1927)	Bennington	Electric		1897	1927	Connected Bennington with several towns and cities in both Massachusetts and New York State.
Brattleboro Street Railway	Brattleboro	Electric		July 31, 1895	August 29, 1923	
Winooski & Burlington Horse Railroad Company (1872–1893); Burlington Traction Company (1893–1929)	Burlington	Horse		November 13, 1885	1893	
Winooski & Burlington Horse Railroad Company (1872–1893); Burlington Traction Company (1893–1929)	Burlington	Electric		1893	August 3, 1929	
Rutland Street Railway Company (1872–1906); Rutland Railway Light & Power Company (1906–1924)	Rutland	Horse		1872	1890s	
Rutland Street Railway Company (1872–1906); Rutland Railway Light & Power Company (1906–1924)	Rutland	Electric		c. 1890s	1924	Connected Rutland with West Rutland, Castleton, Fair Haven and Poultney.
Bellows Falls & Saxtons River Street Railway	Rockingham-Westminster	Electric		1900	1924	Connected Rockingham's villages of Bellows Falls and Saxtons River as well as Westminster's village of North Westminster.
Springfield Electric Railway (1897–1921); Springfield Terminal Railroad (1921–1956)	Springfield	Electric		1897	1956	Connected Springfield and Charlestown, New Hampshire.
St. Albans Street Railway	St. Albans-Swanton	Electric		1904	1924	Connected St. Albans with Swanton.
Mount Mansfield Electric Railroad	Stowe-Waterbury	Electric		1897	1932	Connected Stowe and Waterbury.

== Virginia ==
Name	Location	Motive power	Type	Opened	Closed	Notes
	Charlottesville	Horse		May 14, 1887	?	
	Charlottesville	Electric		?	1935	
	Danville	Horse		August 15, 1887	1888	
	Danville	Electric		?	1938	
	Fredericksburg	Horse		?	?	
	Lynchburg	Electric		?	March 2, 1941	
	Norfolk (first era)	Horse		August 1870	?	Irregular service until 1875
	Norfolk (first era)	Electric		1894	July 11, 1948	
	♦ Newport News	Electric		c. 1890s	January 1946	
	♦ Portsmouth	Electric		?	1936	
The Tide	**Norfolk** (second era)	Electric	Light rail	August 19, 2011		
	Petersburg	Horse		c. 1880s	?	
	Petersburg	Electric		?	1936	
	Radford	Electric		?	?	
Richmond Union Passenger Railway	Richmond	Horse		c. 1860s	?	
Richmond Union Passenger Railway	Richmond	Electric		February 2, 1888	November 25, 1949	First successful, reliable, large electrified streetcar system in the world, due to its use of the trolley pole invented by Frank J. Sprague.
	Roanoke	Horse		c. 1880s	?	
	Roanoke	Electric		?	August 31, 1948	
	Staunton	Electric		?	?	
Tazewell Railway and Light Company	Tazewell	Electric		1892	1933	Was said to be the smallest town to ever have an electric streetcar.

== Washington ==
Name	Location	Motive power	Type	Opened	Closed	Notes
	Aberdeen	Electric		1905	July 31, 1932	Connected Aberdeen, Hoquiam and Cosmopolis.
	Bellingham	Horse		March 28, 1891	?	
	Bellingham	Electric		1891	December 1, 1938	
Twin City Railroad	Chehalis	Electric		1910	1929	Connected Chehalis and Centralia.
	Everett	Electric		July 3, 1893	1923	
	Olympia	Horse		c. 1880s	c. 1890s	
	Olympia	Electric		c. 1890s	1932	
	Port Townsend	Steam		?	c. 1890s	
	Port Townsend	Electric		1895	c. 1890s	
Seattle Street Railway	Seattle (first era)	Horse		September 23, 1884	?	See: Seattle Street Railway
Seattle Street Railway	Seattle (first era)	Cable		September 29, 1888	August 9, 1940	See: Seattle Street Railway
Seattle Street Railway	Seattle (first era)	Electric		March 30, 1889	April 12, 1941	See: Seattle Street Railway
Waterfront Streetcar	**Seattle** (second era)	Electric		May 29, 1982	November 18, 2005	Heritage streetcar line called the Waterfront Streetcar. Operation was suspended in 2005, but long-stalled plans to restore service have been dropped, and three of the five cars were sold in 2016.
Seattle Streetcar	**Seattle** (second era)	Electric		December 12, 2007		Reintroduction; see Seattle Streetcar.
Sound Transit 1 Line	**Seattle** (second era)	Electric	Light rail	July 18, 2009		See Link light rail.
Sound Transit 2 Line	**Seattle** (second era)	Electric	Light rail	April 27, 2024		See Link light rail.
	South Bend	Electric		1911	June 1930	Connected South Bend and Raymond.
	Spokane	Horse		c. 1880s	?	
	Spokane	Cable		September 21, 1889	July 22, 1894	
	Spokane	Electric		?	1936	
	Stanwood	Petrol (gasoline)		1904	1918	H. & H. Railroad connected Stanwood and East Stanwood.
	Stanwood	Steam		1918	1938	H. & H. Railroad connected Stanwood and East Stanwood.
	Tacoma (first era)	Horse		May 30, 1888	?	
	Tacoma (first era)	Cable		August 4, 1891	April 8, 1938	
	Tacoma (first era)	Electric		February 10, 1890	June 11, 1938	See Streetcars in Tacoma, Washington.
Sound Transit T Line	**Tacoma** (second era)	Electric	Light rail	August 22, 2003		Reintroduction, formerly known as Tacoma Link. See Link light rail.
	Vancouver	Electric		?	1927	See also Portland, Oregon.
	Walla Walla	Horse		1890	1899	
Walla Walla Valley Railway	Walla Walla	Electric		December 24, 1906	December 31, 1926	
Walla Walla Valley Railway	♦ Walla Walla – Milton-Freewater, Oregon	Electric		April 16, 1907	September 2, 1931	A 14-mile (23 km) electric interurban line.
Yakima Valley Transportation Company	Yakima	Electric		December 25, 1907	February 1, 1947	Heritage streetcar service (Yakima Valley Trolleys) began operation October 12, 1974.

== West Virginia ==
Name	Location	Motive power	Type	Opened	Closed	Notes
	Bluefield	Electric		c. 1900s	1936	
	Charleston	Electric		?	1939	
	Clarksburg	Electric		1899	1939	
	Fairmont	Electric		1900	1940	
Ohio Valley Electric Railway	Huntington	Electric		c. 1880s	1938	
Martinsburg Street Railway	Martinsburg	Electric		c. 1891	c. 1893	
	Morgantown	Electric		1903	1934	Morgantown's modern transit system is the Morgantown Personal Rapid Transit people mover.
	Newell	Electric		?	?	
	Parkersburg	Horse		1889	?	
	Parkersburg	Electric		1898	May 25, 1947	
	Princeton	Electric		?	1940	
	Wheeling	Horse		July 21, 1886	?	
	Wheeling	Electric		March 15, 1888	April 14, 1948	

== Wisconsin ==
Name	Location	Motive power	Type	Opened	Closed	Notes
Appleton Electric Street Railway	Appleton	Electric		August 19, 1886	April 6, 1930	
Ashland Street Railway Company	Ashland	Horse		June 29, 1887	1893	
Ashland Light Power & Street Railway Co.	Ashland	Electric		January 22, 1893	September 25, 1933	
Beloit Traction	Beloit	Electric		July 31, 1907	August 12, 1930	
Chippewa Valley Electric Company	♦ Chippewa Falls	Electric		?	?	
Eau Claire Street Railway Company	Eau Claire	Horse		1880	1889	
Chippewa Valley Electric Company	Eau Claire	Electric		November 15, 1889	April 8, 1932	
Eastern Wisconsin Electric Company	Fond du Lac	Horse		1888	1888	
Eastern Wisconsin Electric Company	Fond du Lac	Electric		October 20, 1893 June 27, 1899	1894 1931	
Green Bay Traction	Green Bay	Electric		June 8, 1894	November 17, 1937	
Janesville Street Railway Company	Janesville	Horse		July 24, 1886	November 27, 1891	
Janesville Traction	Janesville	Electric		June 24, 1892	July 8, 1929	
	Kaukauna	Electric		January 29, 1902 from Appleton. 1904 from Green Bay.	May 9, 1928	Served by Wisconsin Traction Light Heat & Power from Appleton and Green Bay Traction. The two systems met in Kaukauna to exchange passengers but did not normally run through despite a physical connection.
Kenosha Electric Streetcar	**Kenosha**	Electric		February 1, 1903 June 17, 2000	June 1931	**Heritage streetcar**
La Crosse City Railway Company	La Crosse	Horse		1878	?	
	La Crosse	Electric		1893	November 1945	
Madison Railways Company	Madison	Horse		November 15, 1884	September 30, 1892	
Madison Railways Company	Madison	Electric		1889	February 3, 1935	
Manitowoc & Two Rivers Railway	Manitowoc	Electric		1902	May 9, 1927	Also served Two Rivers
	Marinette	Horse		1889	?	
	Marinette	Electric		1891	1928	System also served Menominee, Michigan.
	Menasha	Electric		?	?	Served by Wisconsin Traction Light Heat & Power from Appleton.
Merrill Railway & Lighting Co.	Merrill	Electric		1889	1921	
	Milwaukee (first era)	Horse		August 30, 1860	?	
The Milwaukee Electric Railway and Light Company	Milwaukee (first era)	Electric		April 3, 1890	March 2, 1958	System also included interurban lines
The Hop	**Milwaukee** (second era)	Electric		November 2, 2018		**Reintroduction**
Eastern Wisconsin Electric Company	Neenah	Horse		1880	?	
Eastern Wisconsin Electric Company	Neenah	Electric		?	?	
Oshkosh Street Railroad Company	Oshkosh	Horse		October 18, 1882	1897	
Eastern Wisconsin Electric Company	Oshkosh	Electric		July 14, 1897	May 21, 1930	Omro was served by a line from Oshkosh
Chicago & Wisconsin Valley	Portage	Electric		June 1913	1922	
Belle City Street Railway Company	Racine	Horse		October 3, 1883	?	
	Racine	Electric		November 1892	October 1, 1940	
	Sheboygan	Horse		1886	1895	
Wisconsin Power & Light	Sheboygan	Electric		November 27, 1895	1935	
Duluth Street Railway	Superior	Horse		August 22, 1887	1890	
Duluth Street Railway	Superior	Electric		July 1, 1890	June 23, 1935	System also served Duluth, Minnesota.
	Watertown	Electric		June 1926	July 1927	
Waupaca Electric Light and Railway Company	Waupaca	Electric		July 9, 1899	July 4, 1925	
Wisconsin Valley Electric	Wausau	Electric		1906	October 1, 1940	
Wisconsin Rapids Street Railroad	Wisconsin Rapids	Electric		November 1, 1910	August 15, 1931	

== Wyoming ==
Name	Location	Motive power	Type	Opened	Closed	Notes
	Cheyenne	Horse		?	?	
	Cheyenne	Electric		?	August 15, 1924	
Sheridan Railway Company	Sheridan	Electric	Streetcar & Interurban	August 11, 1910	April 1926	Consisted of 2 city streetcar lines and 1 interurban line

== See also ==
- List of town tramway systems – parent article
- List of town tramway systems in North America
- Streetcars in North America
- Light rail in the United States
- List of United States light rail systems by ridership
- List of tram and light rail transit systems
- List of rail transit systems in the United States
- List of metro systems
- List of United States rapid transit systems by ridership
- List of trolleybus systems in the United States
