= List of California street railroads =

The following street, interurban, or other electric railways operated in California.

== East Bay ==
- Alameda, Oakland and Piedmont Railroad
- Broadway, Berkeley and Piedmont Street Railroad
- Brooklyn and Fruitvale Railroad
- Claremont University and Ferris Street Railway
- Highland Park and Fruitvale Railway
- Interurban Electric Railway
- Key System
- Oakland and Berkeley Rapid Transit Company
- Oakland, Brooklyn and Fruitvale Railroad
- San Francisco, Oakland & San Jose Consolidated Railway
- Alameda County Terminal Railway from part of the Alameda County Railway
- East Shore and Suburban Railway
- Oakland Traction Company 1906–1912
  - Berkeley Traction Company
  - Oakland Traction Consolidated 1904–1906
    - Oakland Transit Consolidated 1902–1904
      - Oakland Transit Company 1901
        - California Railway 1890–1901
          - Alameda and Oakland Horsecar Railroad 1870–1892
          - Oakland, Alameda and Laundry Farm Railroad 1888–1890
            - Alameda County Railway
        - Central Avenue Railway 1892–1898 narrow gauge Oakland
          - Central Avenue Railroad 1889–1892 narrow gauge proposed cable
        - Oakland Consolidated Street Railway
        - Central Avenue Railway
        - Piedmont and Mountain View Railway
          - Piedmont Cable Company
            - Broadway and Piedmont Railroad
            - Fourteenth Street Railroad
        - East Oakland Street Railway
        - Highland Park and Fruitvale Railroad
        - Oakland Railroad Company
          - Oakland Cable Railway
            - San Pablo Railroad (San Pablo Avenue Horsecar Railroad)
      - Oakland, San Leandro and Hayward Electric Railway Consolidated
        - Oakland, San Leandro and Haywards Electric Railway
        - Twenty-Third Avenue Electric Railway
    - Webster Street and Park Railway/Webster and Lake Park Railroad
- Shipyard Railway

== Los Angeles–San Bernardino ==
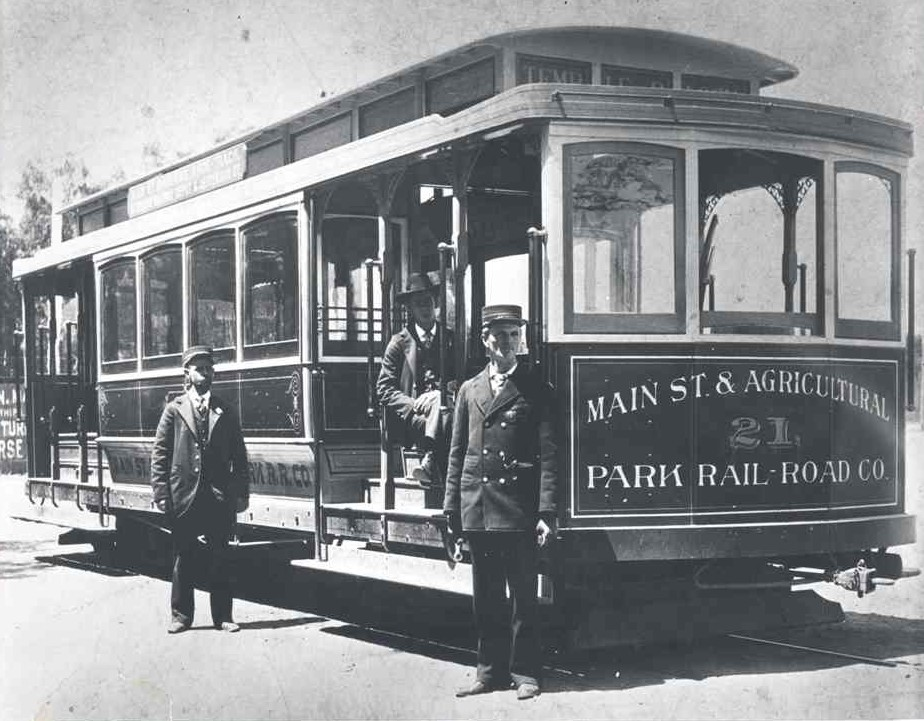
Main Street & Agricultural Park Railroad streetcar 21, 1896

- Alhambra and Pasadena Street Railway
- Anaheim Street Railway
- Central and Boyle Heights Railroad
- City Railway (Pasadena)
- City Railway (San Bernardino)
- Colorado Street Railway
- Colton and San Bernardino Railway
- Highland Railroad
- Lake Shore Electric Railway
- Los Angeles Consolidated Electric Railway
  - Consolidated Electric Railway
  - Depot Railway of Los Angeles
  - Electric Rapid Transit Company
    - Los Angeles Electric Railway
  - Los Angeles Cable Railway
  - Los Angeles and Vernon Street Railway
  - Mateo Street and Santa Fe Avenue Street Car Company
- Main Street and Agricultural Park Railroad
- Monrovia Street Railway
- Orange Grove Street Railroad
- Pacific Railway
- Pasadena Street Railroad
- Riverside and Arlington Street Railway
- San Antonio and Holt Avenue Railroad
- San Bernardino, Arrowhead and Waterman Railway
- Santa Ana, Orange and Tustin Street Railway
- Second Street Cable Railroad
- Southern California Motor Road Company
- Temple Street Cable Railway
- West Pasadena Railway
- Los Angeles Railway narrow gauge
  - Central Railroad (of California)
    - City Railroad
      - Central and Boyle Heights Railroad Horsecar narrow gauge 1885
    - Spring and West Sixth Street Railroad 1874–1884 Horsecar narrow gauge
  - Los Angeles and Redondo Railway
    - Redondo Railway Company
      - Rosecrans Railroad Company
- Pacific Electric Railway
  - Brooklyn Avenue Railway
  - East Ninth Street Railway
  - Los Angeles Inter-Urban Railway
    - California Pacific Railway narrow gauge 1899–1901 PE's Torrance Line
    - Los Angeles Traction
    - Los Angeles and Glendale Railway
    - California Pacific Railway
      - Santa Ana and Orange Motor Railway
      - San Gabriel Rapid Transit Railway
  - Los Angeles and Pasadena Electric Railway/Los Angeles and Pasadena Railway
    - Pasadena and Los Angeles Electric Railway
      - West Pasadena Railway 1887–1894
        - Colorado Street Railway
  - Los Angeles and Redondo Railway
    - Redondo Railway
    - Redondo and Hermosa Beach Railroad
  - Los Angeles Pacific Railway
    - Pasadena and Pacific Railway Company of California
      - Los Angeles County Railroad
      - Ostrich Farm Railway
  - Ontario and San Antonio Heights Railway
  - Pacific Electric Railway Company of Arizona
  - Pasadena and Mount Lowe Railway/Mount Lowe Railway
    - Pasadena and Mount Wilson Railway
  - Redlands Central Railway
  - Riverside and Arlington Railway
  - San Bernardino Interurban Railway
  - San Bernardino Valley Traction Company
    - Redlands Street Railway
    - San Bernardino and Highlands Electric Railway
  - Santa Ana and Orange Railway
  - Temple Street Cable Railway/Temple Street Railway narrow gauge 1885–1902
  - Terracina and Redlands Street Railway narrow gauge Mule Power 1892–1895 Property Sold to PE

== Sacramento Valley ==
- Sacramento Northern Railway 1925–1983 (Chico to Sacramento to Oakland after purchase of the Oakland Antioch and Eastern/San Francisco–Sacramento Railroad in 1928.)
  - Sacramento Northern Railroad 1918–1925 (Chico to Sacramento.) Purchased by WP in 1921.
    - Northern Electric Railway 1907–1918 (Chico to Sacramento.) Name changed to SN in 1918.
      - Northern Electric Company 1905–1907
        - Chico Electric Railway 1904–1905
        - Marysville and Yuba City Street Railway 1889–1906
      - Shasta Southern Railway 1905–1907
      - Vallejo and Northern Railroad 1910–1912
        - Vallejo and Northern Railway 1909–1910
    - Sacramento Terminal Company 1908–1918
    - Northern Electric Railway—Marysville and Colusa Branch 1910–1918
    - Sacramento and Woodland Railroad 1911–1918
  - San Francisco–Sacramento Railroad 1920–1928
    - Oakland, Antioch and Eastern Railway 1911–1920
      - Sacramento Valley West Side Electric Railway 1915–1917 Dixon
      - Oakland and Antioch Railway 1909–1911
    - West Side Railroad 1911–1921 proposed to build to Rio Vista
- Woodland Street Railway

== San Diego ==
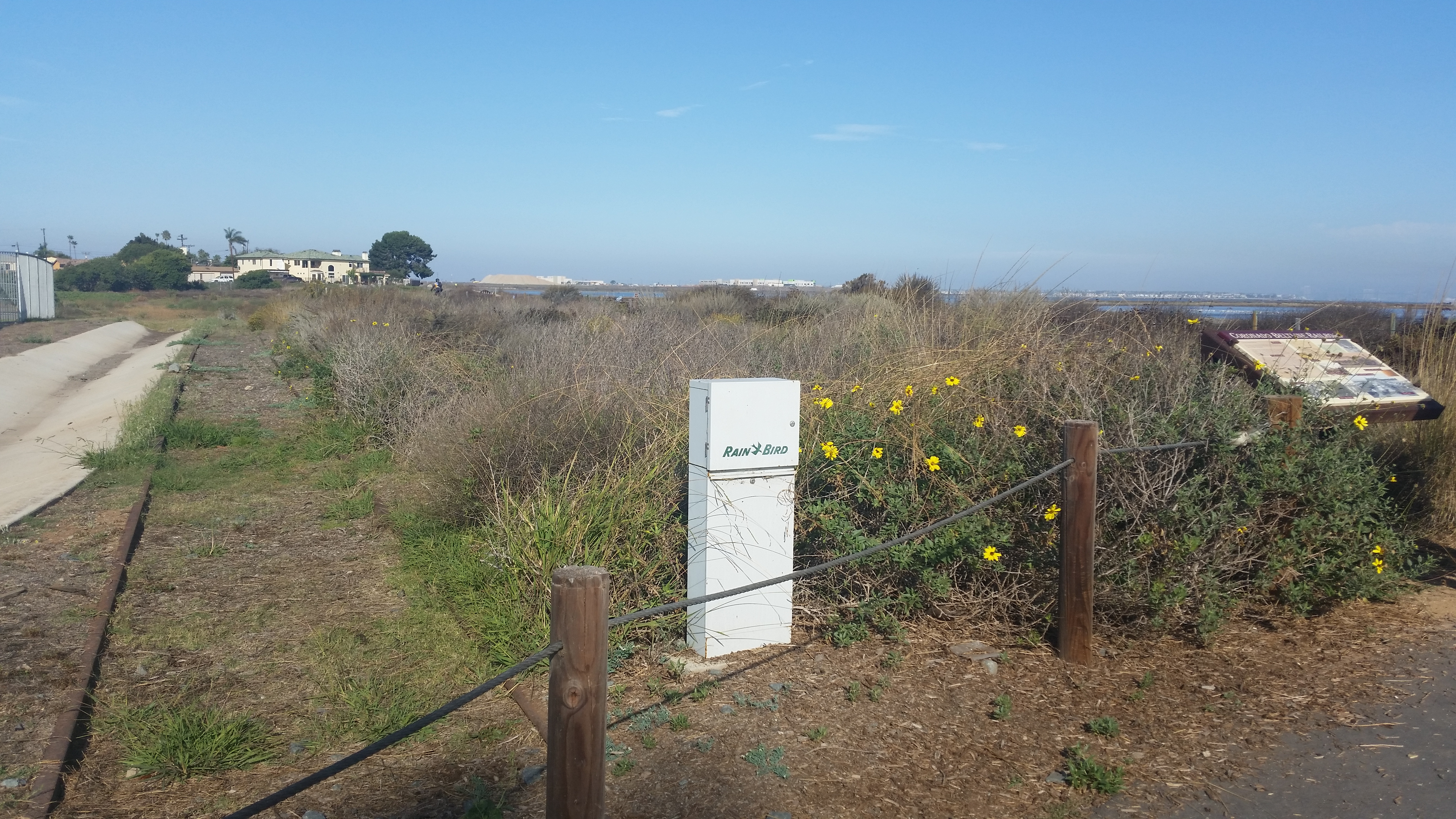
A portion of the remaining abandoned track, and a sign placed by SANDAG after a portion of the historical track was removed during the construction of the Bayshore Bikeway. Picture taken in Imperial Beach.

- Coronado Railroad
- Electric Rapid Transit Street Car Company
- Los Angeles and San Diego Beach Railway
- National City Street Car Company
- San Diego Cable Railway
- San Diego Electric Railway
- San Diego Street Car Company
- San Diego Street Railway
- San Diego and Old Town Street Railway
- San Diego, Old Town and Pacific Beach Railroad
- San Diego and Pacific Beach Railway
- San Diego, Pacific Beach and La Jolla Railway

== San Francisco ==
Name	From	To	Successor	Notes
Bay Shore and South San Francisco Street Railway			Ferries and Cliff House Railway	
California Street Railroad	1878	1884	California Street Cable Railroad	
California Street Cable Railroad	1884	1951	San Francisco Municipal Railway	
Central Railroad	1863	1893	Market Street Railway	
City Railroad	1863	1893	Market Street Railway	
Clay Street Hill Railroad	1873	1888	Ferries and Cliff House Railway	World's first successful cable hauled street railway
Ferries and Cliff House Railway	1887	1893	Market Street Railway	
Front Street, Mission and Ocean Railroad	1863		Sutter Street Railway	
Geary Street, Park and Ocean Railroad	1878	1912	San Francisco Municipal Railway	
Gough Street Railroad				
Market Street Cable Railway	1882	1893	Market Street Railway	
Market Street Railway	1918	1944	San Francisco Municipal Railway	
Market Street Railway	1893	1902	United Railroads of San Francisco	
Market Street Railway	1860	1882	Market Street Cable Railway	
Market Street and Fairmount Railway	1886	1893	Market Street Railway	
Metropolitan Railway	1891		Market Street Railway	
North Beach and Mission Railroad	1862	1893	Market Street Railway	
Ocean Beach Railway	1885	1893	Market Street Railway	
Ocean Shore Railroad	1911	1920		After abandonment, tracks on Potrero Avenue retained by San Francisco Municipal Railway H Potrero route.
Ocean Shore Railway	1906	1911	Ocean Shore Railroad	
Omnibus Cable Company	1888	1893	Market Street Railway	
Omnibus Railroad			Omnibus Railroad and Cable Company	
Omnibus Railroad and Cable Company			Omnibus Cable Company	
Park and Cliff House Railway	1887	1888	Ferries and Cliff House Railway	
Park and Ocean Railroad	1883	1893	Market Street Railway	
Parkside Transit Company		1909	San Francisco Electric Railways	
Potrero and Bay View Railroad	1866	1893	Market Street Railway	
Presidio & Ferries Railway	1881	1913	San Francisco Municipal Railway	
San Francisco Electric Railways	1909		Gough Street Railroad	
San Francisco Municipal Railway	1912	—		Operational. Original lines abandoned; oldest routes currently operating date from 1917.
San Francisco and San Mateo Railway	1892	1896	San Francisco and San Mateo Electric Railway	
San Francisco and San Mateo Electric Railway	1896	1902	United Railroads of San Francisco	
South San Francisco Railroad and Power Company	1903	1938		
Southern Heights and Visitacion Railway	1892	1893	Market Street Railway	
Sutro Railroad	1896		Sutter Street Railway	
Sutter Street Railway	1879	1902	United Railroads of San Francisco	
Telegraph Hill Railroad		1886	N/A	
United Railroads of San Francisco	1902	1918	Market Street Railway	

== San Jose ==
=== Interurban Railways ===
- Peninsular Railway Company
  - Peninsular Railroad
  - San Jose-Los Gatos Interurban Railway Company
  - Santa Clara Interurban Railroad

=== Streetcar Companies ===
- San Jose Railroads
  - San Jose and Santa Clara County Railway
    - Alum Rock Railway Company
      - San Jose and Alum Rock Park Motor Company
    - First Street and San Pedro Street Railroad
    - First Street and Willow Glen Railroad
    - North Side Horse Railroad
    - People's Railroad
    - South East Side Horse Railroad Company
  - San Jose Railway Company
    - San Jose Railroad Company
    - Willow Glen Railroad Company

== Other cities and towns ==
Bakersfield

- Bakersfield and Kern Electric Railway

Eureka

- Eureka Street Railroad

Fresno

- Fresno Railroad
- Fresno City Railway
- Fresno City, Belmont and Yosemite Railroad
- Fresno Traction Company

North Bay Area

- San Francisco and Napa Valley Railroad abandoned, in phases during period 1938–1956
  - San Francisco, Napa and Calistoga Railway 1911–1936 electric interurban Napa city to Calistoga.
    - San Francisco, Vallejo and Napa Valley Railroad 1906–1911
      - Vallejo, Benicia and Napa Valley Railroad 1902–1910
- Santa Rosa Railroad 1903–1923 (Later Northwestern Pacific Railroad part of SP)
- Petaluma and Santa Rosa Railroad
  - Petaluma Street Railroad
  - Santa Rosa Street Railway
    - Central Street Railway narrow gauge horsecar (Sonoma County)
    - Union Street Railway narrow gauge horsecar (Sonoma County) 1893–1897
      - South Side Street Railway/South Side Railway narrow gauge horsecar 1888–1893

Paso Robles

- Paso Robles Street Railway

Sacramento

- Pacific Gas & Electric
  - Central Electric Railway
    - Central Street Railway
- Highland Park Railway
- Sacramento City Street Railroad
- Sacramento Valley Electric Railroad

San Luis Obispo

- San Luis Street Railway
- San Luis Obispo Street Railway

Santa Barbara

- Santa Barbara Street Railroad
- Santa Barbara and Citizens' Street Railroad

Santa Cruz County

- Union Traction Company
  - Santa Cruz, Capitola and Watsonville Railway
    - Santa Cruz Electric Railway
      - Santa Cruz, Garfield Park and Capitola Electric Railway
      - Pacific Avenue Street Railroad
    - East Santa Cruz Street Railway
- City Railroad
- Watsonville Transportation Company (1903–1907)
- Watsonville Railway and Navigation Company (1911–1914)

Stockton

- Stockton Electric Motor Railway
- California Midland Railroad (of 1905) Marysville
- California Terminal Company 1911
  - Lakeport and Richardson's Bay Railroad
- Central California Traction Route downtown Sacramento to Stockton and competed directly with SP and WP between the two cities. Later owned by WP. Converted to diesel. Currently an active Class III freight railroad. Trackage in rural Sacramento County in year 1995 was in nearly inoperable condition. Electric interurban operation ended in 1933.
- Stockton Electric Railroad 1881/1891–1905
  - Stockton Street Railway 1874–1881/1891 horsecar
- Stockton Terminal and Eastern Railroad now a freight railroad, 1908–present
- Tidewater Southern Railway (TS) Stockton to Modesto. Later owned by WP and electric operation converted to diesel. Still active trackage.
  - Tidewater and Southern Transit Company 1912
    - Tidewater and Southern Railroad 1910–1912

Various

- Glendale and Montrose Railway
- Holton Interurban Railway later SP
- Modesto Interurban Railway 1909–1911 later MET
- Monterey, Fresno and Eastern Railroad
- Mount Tamalpais and Muir Woods Railway abandoned 1930
  - Mill Valley and Mount Tamalpais Scenic Railway 1896–1913
- Nevada County Traction Company
- Orange Grove Street Railway 1888–1896
- Second Street Railroad narrow gauge horsecar Pomona
- Pacific Gas and Electric Company
  - West Sacramento Electric Company 1914 (proposed)
- Second Street Cable Railway closed in 1890
- Shasta Springs Scenic Railroad 1888 cable
- Sierra Madre Street Railway 1887–1890/1891 narrow gauge Mule car Los Angeles
- South Beach and Mission Railway c. 1862 San Francisco
- Southern California Motor Road Company narrow gauge 1886–1892 leased to SP San Bernardino-Colton
- Southern California Rapid Transit District Metro Rail 1975–1986 now part of Los Angeles Metro Rail
- Tuscan Mineral Springs Corporation Electric Railway 1903–? Red Bluff–Tuscan Springs
- Ventura and Ojai Valley Railroad 1887 - connected to SP coastal line and owned by SP soon afterwards. Abandoned and railbanked in two sections: Ojai Valley Trail and Ventura River Trail.
- Visalia and Tulare Railroad abandoned 1900
- Visalia Electric Railroad 1904–1992, to SP in 1992.
  - Chowchilla Pacific Railway
- Volcano Northern Railroad 1903 (Amador County)
- Visalia Rail Road to SP in 1899
- West Coast Land Company aka San Luis Street Railway narrow gauge horsecar 1890–1906
  - San Luis Obispo Street Railway

== Proposed lines ==
- Bakersfield and Ventura Railway Electric 1902
- Bay and Coast Railway 1899 narrow gauge Electric & Common Carrier
- Bay Counties Electric Railroad 1905–1907
- Bay Counties Power Company Electric 1902
- Benicia Land and Terminal Railway 1914 Electric
- Big Four Electric Railway 1912–1914
- California Electric Railway 1909
- California Pacific Railroad (of 1901) Los Angeles–San Pedro
- California Rapid Transit Railroad 1907 San Francisco–San Jose–Monterey & San Jose–Martinez
- California Terminal Railway 1914–1915/1916 San Francisco-Marin/Sonoma/Napa/Yolo/Sacramento Counties
- Owens River Valley Electric Railway
- Sausalito Incline Street Railway 1914 Cable/Electric Sausalito
- Scotts Creek Railway 1908 Santa Cruz County
- Sierra County Railroad 1911 Sacramento–Sierra
- Sonoma and Lake County Electric Railway Lakeport–Cloverdale 1907
- Sonoma and Lake County Railroad (of 1907) Lakeport–Cloverdale
- Highland Pacific Railroad 1909
  - Sonoma and Lake County Railway 1909 Lakeport–Cloverdale–Preston
- Southern California Beach Railway 1912–1914 Colton–San Diego
- Stockton and Bay City Short Line Railroad 1911–1912 Stockton–Byron–Antioch–Oakland
- Stockton and Lodi Terminal Railroad 1895 Stockton–Lodi
- Tidewater Northern Railway 1909–1910 Santa Monica–Ventura
- Tulare County Power Company 1911–1912
- Turlock Traction Company 1911 Turlock–Denair
- Union Belt Railway 1906 Sacramento
- University Heights Motor Road 1886–1888 San Diego
- Vallejo Traction Company 1910 Vallejo
- Valley Railroad 1912 Red Bluff–Woodland–Davis–Dixon to connect with Oakland, Antioch and Eastern Railway
- Ventura Terminal Railway 1907/1908
- Yosemite Park Electric Railway 1904
- Yucaipa and Oak Glen Railroad 1908 Standard or narrow gauge Electric Yucaipa–Redlands

== See also ==
- List of California railroads
- List of streetcar systems in the United States

== Bibliography ==
- Borden, Stanley T. (April 1960). "Petaluma & Santa Rosa Electric R.R." The Western Railroader. Vol. 23, no. 4.
- Fickewirth, Alvin A. (1992). California Railroads. San Marino, California: Golden West Books. ISBN 0-87095-106-8.
- Robertson, Donald B. (1998). Encyclopedia of Western Railroad History. Vol. IV. Caldwell, ID: Caxton Printers. ISBN 0-87004-385-4. OCLC 13456066. OL 2716499M.
- Hamm, Edward Jr. (1979). When Fresno Rode the Rails. Glendale, California: Interurbans Press, Ira Swett publisher. ISBN 0-916374-37-8.
- Myrick, David F. (1992). Railroads of Nevada and Eastern California. Vol. I: The Northern Roads (Revised ed.). Reno, Nevada: University of Nevada Press. ISBN 0-87417-193-8.
- Swett, Ira (1971) [1949]. Swett, Ira (ed.). Sacramento Northern Railway, Interurbans Press Special #9 and Special #26 and reprints. Glendale, CA.: Interurbans Press.
- Henry V. Poor, Manual of the Railroads of the United States, 1889, appendix, pp. 38–41
- Poor's Manual of Railroads, Poor's Directory of Railroad Officials and Manual of American Street Railways, August 1890, pp. 1183–1187
- Poor's Railroad Manual, Poor's Directory of Railroad Officials, 1892, pp. 249–254
