= Bakersfield and Kern Electric Railway rolling stock =

Contains a list and information of the rolling stock used on the Bakersfield and Kern Electric Railway in Bakersfield, California. Cars were purchased between 1888 and 1929.

== List of rolling stock ==
=== New cars ===
The following cars were built for the Bakersfield and Kern Electric Railway system.

Car No.	Date Constructed	Car Manufacturer	Type	Capacity (Note: Capacity only counts seating. Does not include standing room.)	Notes
1	1900	C. A. Hammond Car Company	7-ton single-truck California Car	24	Believed destroyed in the car barn fire of 1920.
2	1900	C. A. Hammond Car Company	7-ton single-truck California Car	24	converted to a wire car and wrecker
3	1900	C. A. Hammond Car Company	7-ton single-truck California Car	24	
4	1900	C. A. Hammond Car Company	7-ton single-truck California Car	24	In 1912, was in an accident with a Santa Fe engine. Repaired and converted to a service car. Currently resides in the Southern California Railway Museum.
5	1902	C. A. Hammond Car Company	12-ton double-truck California Car	40	
6	1902	C. A. Hammond Car Company	12-ton double-truck California Car	40	rebuilt
7	1902	C. A. Hammond Car Company	12-ton double-truck California Car	40	
8	Before 1911	Pacific Gas and Electric Company	13-ton double-truck California Car with railroad roof	42	Believed destroyed in the car barn fire of 1920.
9	Before 1911	Pacific Gas and Electric Company	13-ton double-truck California Car with railroad roof	42	
10	1911	American Car Company	17-ton double-truck California Car with transit roof	40	Currently resides in the Kern County Museum.
11	1911	American Car Company	17-ton double-truck California Car with transit roof	40	
12	1911	American Car Company	17-ton double-truck California Car with transit roof	40	
13	1911	American Car Company	17-ton double-truck California Car with transit roof	40	
14	1911	American Car Company	17-ton double-truck California Car with transit roof	40	
15	1911	American Car Company	17-ton double-truck California Car with transit roof	40	

=== Used cars ===
The following cars were built for other California systems. They were later acquired by the Bakersfield and Kern Electric Railway.

Car No.	Date Constructed	Car Manufacturer	Type	Capacity	Date purchased	Purchased from	Sold to
16	1922	American Car Company	Birney Safety Car	30	1927	Union Traction Company of Santa Cruz	
17	1922	American Car Company	Birney Safety Car	30	1927	Union Traction Company of Santa Cruz	1942 to Nova Scotia Light and Power - Nova Scotia, Canada
18	1922	American Car Company	Birney Safety Car	30	1927	Union Traction Company of Santa Cruz	
19	1922	American Car Company	Birney Safety Car	30	1927	Union Traction Company of Santa Cruz	1942 to Nova Scotia Light and Power
20	1924	American Car Company	Birney Safety Car	30	1929	Santa Barbara and Suburban Railway	1942 to Nova Scotia Light and Power
21	1924	American Car Company	Birney Safety Car	30	1929	Santa Barbara and Suburban Railway	1942 to Nova Scotia Light and Power
22	1924	American Car Company	Birney Safety Car	30	1929	Santa Barbara and Suburban Railway	
23	1924	American Car Company	Birney Safety Car	30	1929	Santa Barbara and Suburban Railway	1942 to Nova Scotia Light and Power

== Detailed information ==
=== Horse car ===
Little information is known about the horse cars that were in operation prior to electrification. From pictures, it is known that they were open air and contained 6 benches. That would indicate a capacity of 18 to 20 people. It is unknown how many cars were purchased, or when they were disposed of.

=== Cars 1–4 ===
Cars 1–4 were California Cars, constructed in 1900. They were constructed out of wood and rode on Brill 21 E truck (single truck). They also contained Eclipse fenders and Sterling fare registers. They also contained a single trolley pole, which would swivel to allow for forward and reverse operation.

Information is conflicting as to the car manufacturer and capacity. Common references indicate they were constructed by the C. A. Hammond Car Company, and had a capacity of 24 people. However, the 1915 and 1922 California Railroad Commission evaluation shows the cars were made by W. L. Holman Car Company. It also shows a capacity of 26 people. The confusion most likely originated because both car companies were located in San Francisco.

=== Cars 5–7 ===
Cars 5–7 were California Cars, constructed in 1902. They were constructed out of wood and rode on Brill 276 trucks (double truck). The cars was 35 feet long and had a capacity of 40 people. They were constructed by the C. A. Hammond Car Company (although two Railroad Commission evaluations shows W. L. Holman Car Company). They were equipped with Eclipse fenders, wood walkover seats, Sterling fare registers, and a rope brake system.

=== Cars 8–9 ===
Cars 8–9 were California Cars, with a capacity of 42 people. The exact construction date is unknown, but was between 1902 and 1911 (the dates of the previous and next car orders). They were 39 feet 4 inches long. They were constructed out of wood and rode on diamond arch bar trucks. They were equipped with wooden seats, Sterling fare register, and a rope brake system.

Records show that the cars were manufactured by Pacific Gas and Electric (PG&E). This may seem unusual to many people since the company was (and still is) primarily a power and gas distribution company. However, at the time, they also ran a streetcar line in Sacramento. They also had shops capable of building cars. The October 1956 edition of the Western Railroader indicates that PG&E made cars for the Bakersfield system, and other California railways.

=== Cars 10–15 ===
Cars 10–15 were California Cars, constructed in 1911. They were 42 feet 8 inches long and had a capacity of 40 people. They were manufactured by the American Car Company. The cars were constructed out of wood and rode on Brill 27 G. E. 1 trucks. They were equipped with Eclipse fenders, Sterling fare box and air brakes. The interior section had upholstered seats, while the open section had wood walkover seats. They would be the largest and most luxurious cars to be operated in Bakersfield. It was also the largest single order of cars for the system.

=== Cars 16–19 ===
Cars 16–19 were Birney Safety Cars, constructed by the American Car Company. They were originally built in 1922 for the Union Traction Company of Santa Cruz. The cars were acquired by Bakersfield in 1927.

The cars were constructed out of steel and rode on Brill 79 E1 trucks (single truck). They were 28 feet long and could carry 30 people. They were equipped with wooden seats. They also contained a dead man's switch. Originally it was located in the handle, but was later moved to a floor switch.

=== Cars 20–23 ===
Cars 20–23 were Birney Safety Cars, constructed by the American Car Company. They were originally built in 1924 for the Santa Barbara and Suburban Railway Company. They were acquired by Bakersfield in 1929. They were identical to cars 16–19, purchased two years earlier.
