= Rail transportation in Solano County, California =

This article lists the railroads and a timeline of railroad history in Solano County, California.

== Timeline ==
=== 1849-1859 ===
- 1849 Benicia Barracks established as military post which would last until 1929. California Gold Rush
- 8 Nov 1849 Benicia established post office.
- 18 Feb 1850 Solano County incorporated with county seat at Benicia.
- 1851 Marysville and Benicia Railroad incorporated at Marysville to build a railroad from Marysville to Benicia or Knights Ferry.
- 28 Jul 1851 Vallejo establishes post office.
- 9 Sep 1850 California admitted into the United States.
- 18 Apr 1854 Suisun establishes post office.
- 1 Jun 1854 Vacaville establishes post office.
- 1856 San Francisco and Sacramento Railroad organized to build a 52-mile railroad from Benicia to Sacramento and connect Benicia to San Francisco by steamship. No further details.
- 9 Nov 1857 San Francisco and Marysville Railroad incorporated at Marysville after acquiring Marysville & Benicia Railroad. Some construction performed in 1859.
- 18 Aug 1858 Rio Vista establishes post office.
- 31 Dec 1858 Fairfield established post office.

=== 1860s ===
- 26 Mar 1864 Napa Valley Rail Road incorporated at San Francisco. Railroad built from the tidewater on the northern end the San Pablo Bay south of Napa at a location known as Suscol to Calistoga.
- 5 Dec 1864 Sacramento and San Francisco Railroad incorporated to build proposed railroad between two cities.
- 3 Jan 1865 California Pacific Rail Road incorporated from San Francisco & Marysville Railroad and the Sacramento & San Francisco Railroad.
- 10 Jan 1865 California Pacific Rail Road absorbs the Sacramento & San Francisco Rail Road Company and the San Francisco & Marysville Rail Road Company.
- 11 Jul 1865 Track opened on Napa Valley Railroad between Suscol and Napa. Line from Napa to Calistoga was completed in 1868.
- 24 Dec 1866 California Pacific Rail Road commenced grading from Vallejo towards Suisun then Davisville (Davis).
- 24 Jun 1868 California Pacific completed between Vallejo and Suisun via American Canyon.
- 27 Jul 1868 California Pacific completed from Suisun - Elmira.
- 10 Aug 1868 California Pacific completed from Elmira - Dixon.
- 24 Aug 1868 California Pacific completed from Dixon - Davisville (Davis). Later that year tracks reach Washington (West Sacramento).
- Jan 1869 Napa Valley Rail Road extends line from Suscol to Napa Junction where it interchanged with the California Pacific Railroad.
- 26 Jan 1869 Dixon establishes post office.
- 12 Apr 1869 Vaca Valley Rail Road incorporated to build from Elmira to Madison via Vacaville.
- 14 Apr 1869 California Pacific Railroad Extension Company incorporated to acquire Napa Valley Railroad.
- 10 May 1869 Central Pacific/Union Pacific Golden Spike Ceremony completes Transcontinental Railroad at Promontory Point, Utah. Grading commences on Vaca Valley Rail Road.
- 9 Jun 1869 Napa Valley Rail Road sold under foreclosure to the California Pacific Railroad Extension Company.
- 21 Jun 1869 Vaca Valley Rail Road completed from Elmira - Vacaville. Interchange with California Pacific at Elmira.
- 16 Nov 1869 A small amount of construction commenced on the Suisun, Berryessa and Clear Lake Railroad was organized to build to Clear Lake but the project was abandoned within two years.
- 22 Nov 1869 California Pacific reaches Yuba City/Marysville.
- 29 Dec 1869 California Pacific Railroad incorporated from the combining of the California Pacific Railroad Extension Company and the California Pacific Rail Road.

=== 1870s ===
- 1870 California Pacific reaches Sacramento.
- 21 Feb 1873 Elmira establishes post office.
- 1 May 1873 The California Central Narrow Gauge Railway was organized to build from Benicia to Tehama with an extension to Red Bluff. A small amount of construction commenced but the project was abandoned in 1874.
- 26 Aug 1875 Vaca Valley Rail Road completed from Vacaville - Winters.
- 30 Jun 1876 California Pacific operated by Central Pacific Railroad.
- 19 Feb 1877 Vaca Valley Rail Road becomes Vaca Valley and Clear Lake Railroad.
- 1 May 1877 Vaca Valley & Clear Lake Railroad completed from Winters - Madison. In later years additional track would be built from Madison to Rumsey in Yolo County.
- 6 Dec 1879 Central Pacific completes track between Fairfield/Suisun and Benicia, eliminating need to use route between Fairfield and Vallejo via American Canyon and Cordelia as the mainline.

=== 1880-1899 ===
- 31 Mar 1885 Central Pacific turns over operation of California Pacific to the Southern Pacific Railroad.
- 15 May 1888 Vaca Valley & Clear Lake Railroad consolidated into the Northern Railway, a Southern Pacific Subsidiary.
- 14 Apr 1898 California Pacific formally consolidated into the Southern Pacific Railroad.
- Dec 1902 Cement, Tolenas and Tidewater Railroad operates as an industrial railroad near Fairfield.

=== 1900s ===
- 5 Feb 1903 The Sacramento and Oakland Railroad was organized to build a proposed railroad between the two cities plus branchlines to Richmond and Martinez. The project was later abandoned.
- 16 Jan 1907 Sacramento and Vallejo Railroad incorporated to build a proposed railroad between the two locations. Project was abandoned same year.

19 Sep 1907 Northern Electric Railway incorporated at Chico from purchase of several railroads. No railroad in Solano County at time of incorporation.

- 18 Feb 1907 Napa and Vaca Valley Railroad was incorporated in Vallejo to build from Suscol to Napa Junction, then to Cordelia and terminate in Vacaville. Surveys commenced but the project was abandoned the following year.

=== 1910-1949 ===
- 15 Feb 1910 Vallejo Traction Company was organized to operate an electric railroad in Vallejo from Virginia Street Wharf to the north side of Vallejo. The project was later abandoned.
- 31 Aug 1911 West Side Railroad incorporated to build from Sacramento to Rio Vista. Only 2 miles was constructed in West Sacramento and purchased by Northern Electric Railway in 1912.
- Dec 1912 Northern Electric Railway purchases Vallejo & Northern Railroad in its quest for a line to eventually run from Vallejo to Sacramento via Winters.
- 13 Sep 1913 Oakland, Antioch and Eastern Railway completes interurban line between Sacramento and Oakland.
- 1914 Northern Electric Railway completes line between Willeta (near Suisun) to Vacaville.
- 18 Jul 1914 The Benicia Land and Terminal Railway was incorporated. The railway proposed an electric railway for Benicia to connect with Vallejo, Benicia and Winters through the Berryessa Valley.
- 1 Jan 1915 The Sacramento Valley West Side Electric Railway began operating a 12-mile branch from an interchange with the Oakland, Antioch and Eastern Railway (OA&E) at Dixon Junction to Dixon. The line was operated by OA&E.
- Aug 1917 Permission was given to abandon the Sacramento Valley West Side Electric Railway.
- 20 Sep 1920 the Mare Island Freight Line began operations between Mare Island Navy Yard and Napa Junction. The track was acquired from the San Francisco, Napa & Calistoga Railway.
- 2 Jan 1920 the San Francisco-Sacramento Railroad was incorporated and acquires the Oakland, Antioch & Eastern Railroad.
- 31 Dec 1928 Sacramento Northern Railway, a Western Pacific Railroad subsidiary, acquires the San Francisco-Sacramento Railroad.
- 1930 Bridge connecting Benicia-Martinez was completed, eliminating railroad's need for railroad ferry "Solano" and "Contra Costa" between Benicia and Port Costa, California.
- Jul 1930 Sacramento Northern connects SN mainline at Creed with Vacaville Branch that was built in 1914 by Northern Electric by constructing a 9-mile branch.

=== 1950-present ===
- 1954 Sacramento Northern's ferry "Ramon" was scrapped after failing to pass Coast Guard safety inspection. The Ramon ferried Sacramento Northern trains across the Carquinez Strait from about 1915 to 1954.
- 15 Aug 1956 Mare Island Freight Line Company sold to the U.S. Government.
- 1957 Last passenger train operated between Elmira and Esparto on Southern Pacific's Esparto Branch (ex Vaca Valley Railroad).
- Late 1980s Winters Branch (ex Vaca Valley Railroad) abandoned by Southern Pacific Railroad.
- 11 Sep 1996 Southern Pacific sold to Union Pacific Railroad.
- 1991 Amtrak California's Capitol Corridor establishes frequent intercity passenger service between Sacramento and the San Francisco Bay Area. Service was established as a result of two California Ballot Initiatives that were approved by voters in 1990; Propositions 108 and 116.

== Population of Solano County Towns ==
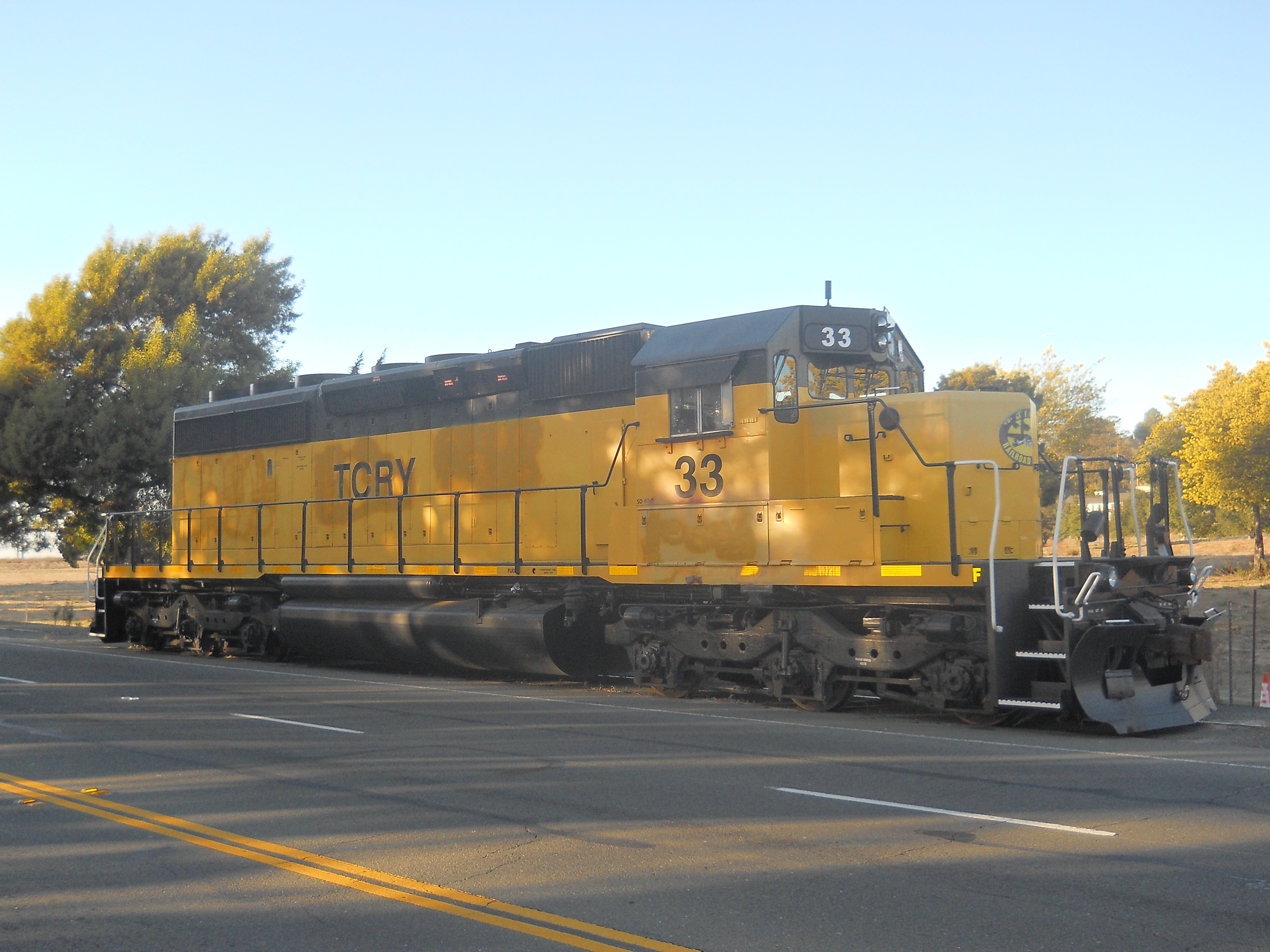
A train engine sits parked on the rails near the Mare Island Bridge in Vallejo, California

City	1860	1870	1880	1890	1900	1910	1920
Benicia	1,470	1,656	2,067	2,951	2,751	2,360	2,693
Dixon	N/A	N/A	N/A	1,082	783	827	926
Elmira	N/A	N/A	816	869	717	494	452
Rio Vista	N/A	888	1,232	1,236	682	884	1,104
Vacaville	1,831	1,701	1,299	2,712	1,220	1,177	1,254
Vallejo	1,431	6,391	6,587	6,866	7,965	11,340	21,107

== List of Solano County Railroads ==
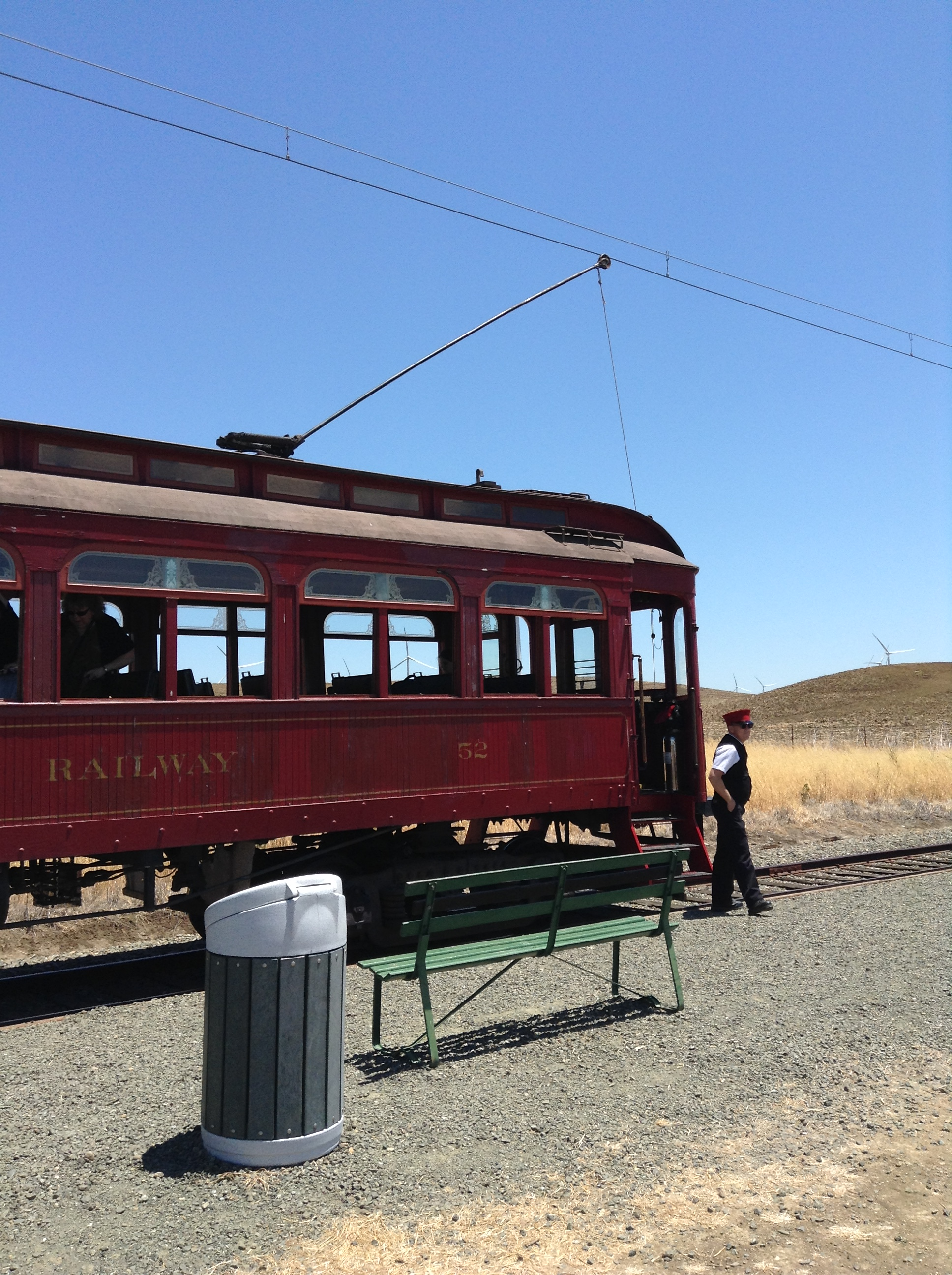
A conductor stands in front of a train from the Western Railroad Museum in Solano County

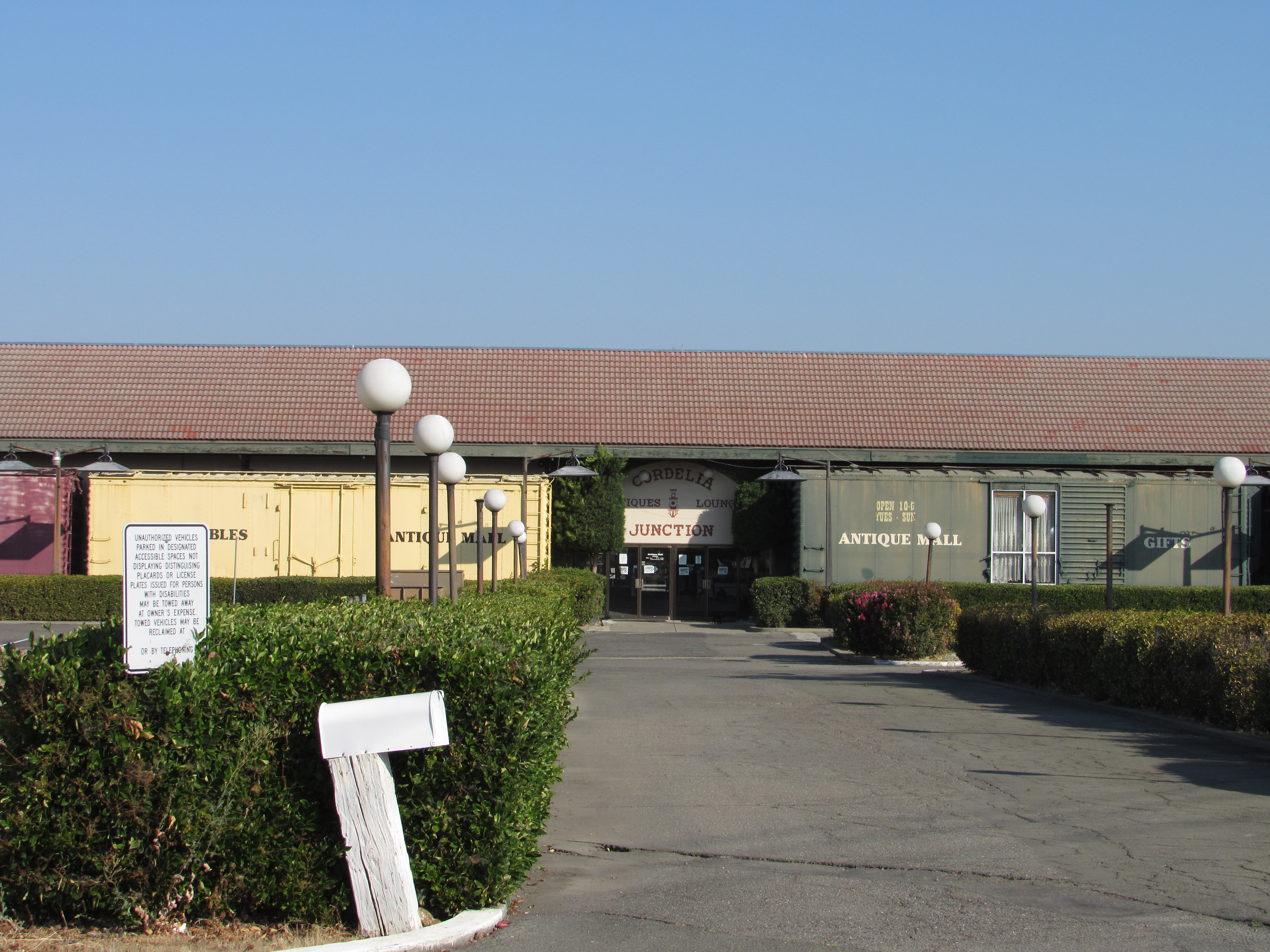
An antique store in Cordelia, California housed in old rail cars

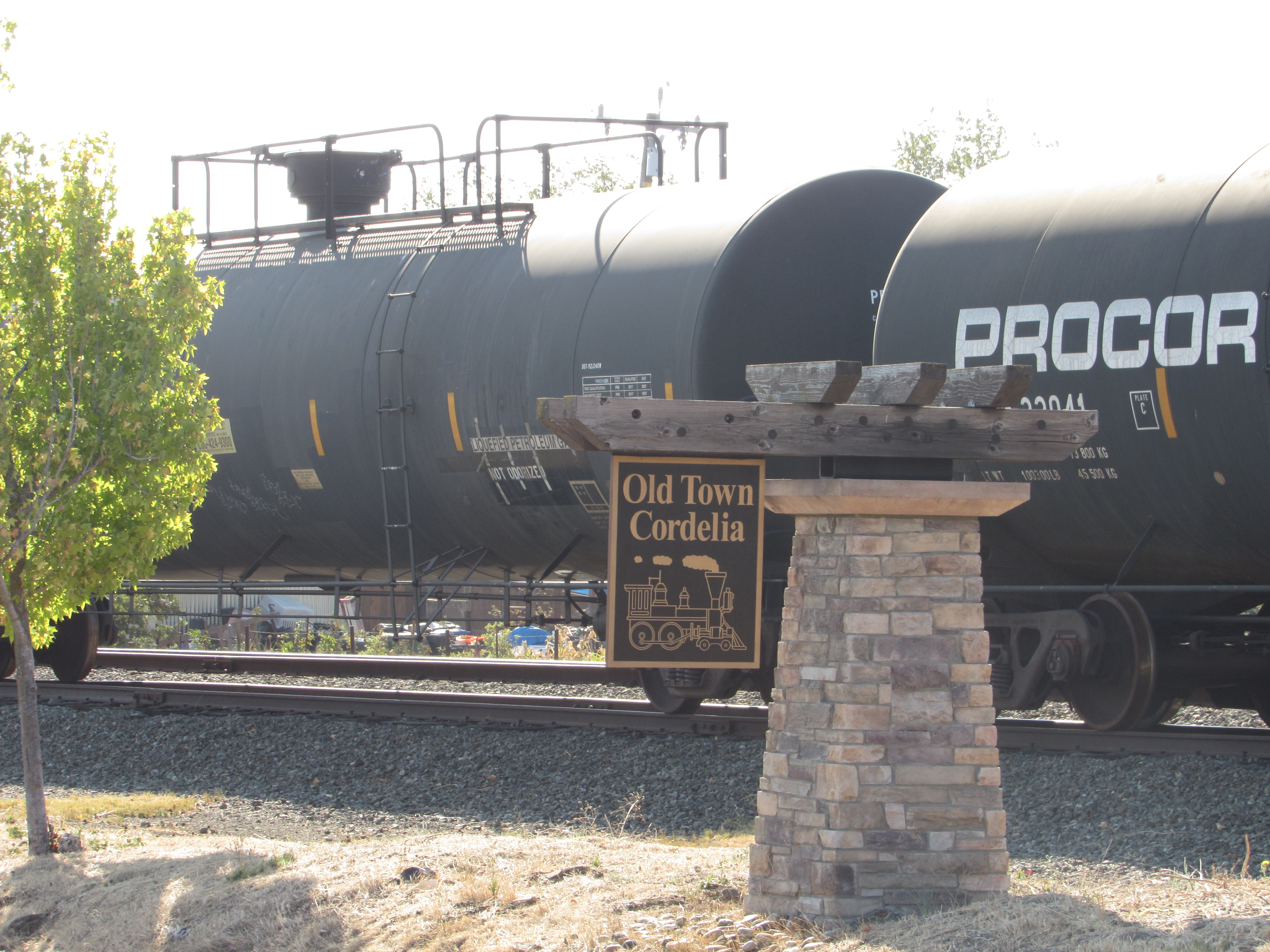
A train sits behind the Old Town Cordelia sign in Cordelia, California

- Benicia Land and Terminal Railway
- Cement, Tolenas and Tidewater Railroad
- Mare Island Freight Line Company
- Napa and Vaca Valley Railroad
- Sacramento and Oakland Railroad
- Sacramento and Vallejo Railroad
- Sacramento Valley West Side Electric Railway 1915-1917 (Connected with OA&E to connect to Dixon. Proposed extending to Woodland and Marysville up the West Sacramento Valley.
- San Francisco, Napa and Calistoga Railway
- Union Pacific Railroad Present
  - Southern Pacific Railroad
    - Central Pacific Railroad
      - California Pacific Railroad 1865–1876
        - Napa Valley Railroad
        - San Francisco and Marysville Railroad 1857–1865
          - Marysville and Benicia Railroad 1851–1857
    - Northern Railway - an SP Subsidiary
      - Vaca Valley & Clear Lake Railroad
        - Vaca Valley Rail Road
  - Western Pacific Railroad
    - Sacramento Northern Railroad
      - Northern Electric Railway
        - Vallejo and Northern Railroad
        - West Side Railroad - 1911 to 1912, Proposed Sacramento to Rio Vista, only built track in West Sacramento
      - Sacramento Northern Railway
        - Sacramento-San Francisco Railway
          - Oakland, Antioch and Eastern Railway
- Vallejo Traction Company - Proposed within Vallejo in 1910
