= San Francisco, Napa and Calistoga Railway =

Railroad in California, United States

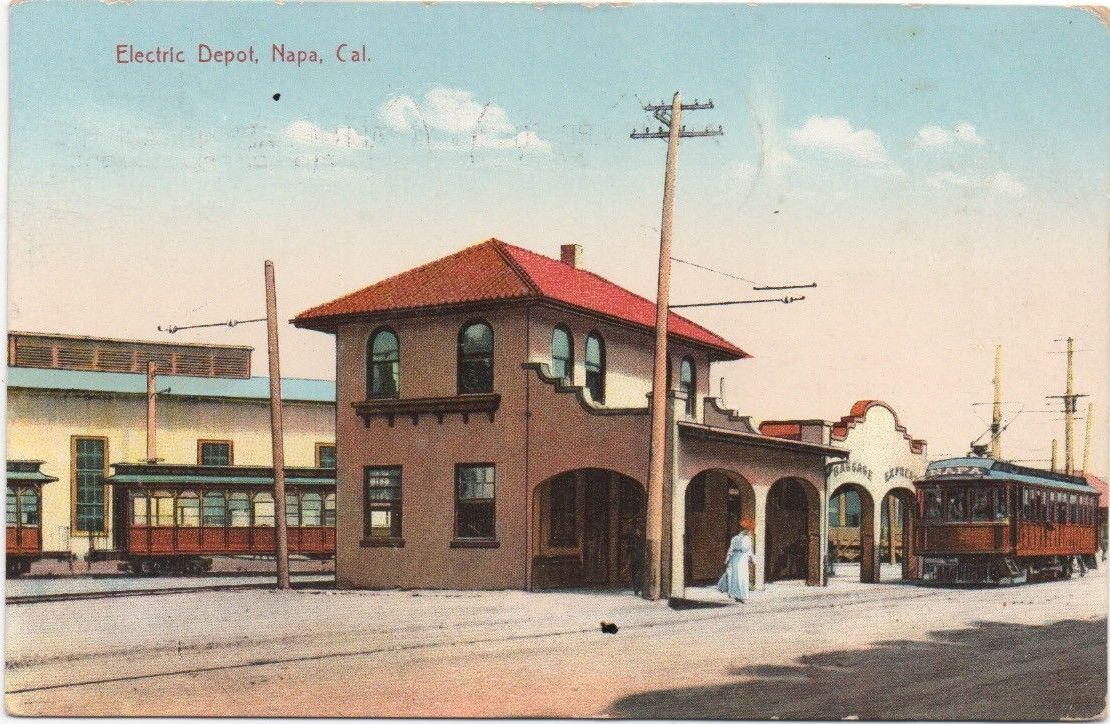
- SFN&C station in Napa in the 1910s

Overview
- Locale: Vallejo-Napa-St. Helena-Calistoga
- Dates of operation: 1905–1937
- Successor: Greyhound, Navy Department

Technical
- Track gauge: 4 ft 8 1/2 in (1,435 mm) standard gauge
- Electrification: 3,300 V 25 Hz AC
- Length: 42 miles (68 km)

The San Francisco, Napa and Calistoga Railway, later briefly reorganized as the San Francisco and Napa Valley Railroad, was an electric interurban railroad in the U.S. state of California. In conjunction with the Monticello Steamship Company, the railway offered a combined rail- and ferry-service called the "Napa Valley Route."

== Construction ==
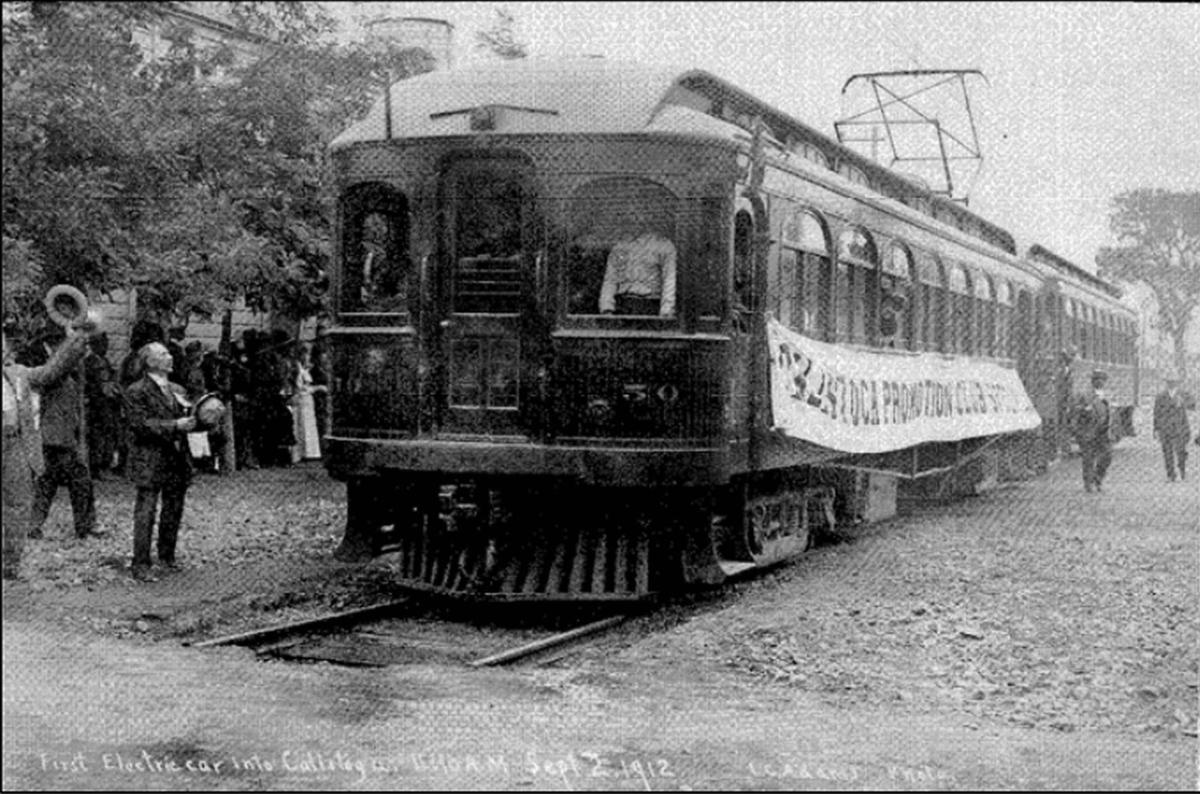
The First Electric Train of the S.F.N. & C.R. to enter Calistoga, photo looking south on Washington from Lincoln

In 1901, Col. J.W. Hartzell and his brother H.F. Hartzell secured a franchise to build an electric railway line, which allowed them the right to build on city streets and along county roads. The line paralleled much of the already existing route of the Napa Valley Railroad. In April 1902, the Benicia, Vallejo & Napa Valley Railroad Company was incorporated. The line originated at the port of Vallejo where it met the ferry connecting to San Francisco. From there, it headed northwards for a total of 41.7 miles (67.1 km) to terminate at Calistoga, passing through Napa, Yountville, Oakville, Rutherford, and St. Helena. Construction of the railroad commenced in 1903 and trains began running from Vallejo to Napa following a grand opening on July 4, 1905. The line was extended to Yountville by 1907, to St. Helena on January 1, 1908, and to Calistoga on September 12, 1912. The railroad went through several reorganizations and name changes throughout its lifetime. It was named San Francisco, Vallejo & Napa Valley Railroad in 1906 and in 1911 it was renamed San Francisco, Napa & Calistoga Railway Company. The railroad remained in operation until 1937. In 1938 22 miles (35 km) of track and power lines between Napa and Calistoga were removed.

== Equipment ==
The electrically powered railroad was the first west of the Mississippi River to operate on alternating current. Much of the early passenger equipment consisted of graceful wooden cars manufactured by Niles and very similar to some equipment of the Sacramento Northern Railway. By 1931 the line operated 9 motor passenger cars with 5 unpowered trailer passenger cars, and one electric locomotive with twenty freight cars. The line used 25 Hz AC at 3,300 Volts rather than the direct-current equipment used on most interurban railroads.

Two steel cars built in 1933 were the last traditional interurban cars built in the United States before PCC streetcars were designed.

== 1913 wreck ==
On June 19, 1913, two trains of the San Francisco, Napa and Calistoga Railway collided head-on in the worst interurban accident in the state of California. Thirteen people were killed.

== Decline ==
Passenger service continued despite several setbacks until 1937, when the ferry service was discontinued; without the ferry traffic, the line could not survive. The last passenger trains operated on September 12 of that year, and the last mail trains on September 30. On February 13, 1938, a farewell excursion train was operated between Vallejo and Napa for the Electric Railway Historical Society of California.

Following the end of passenger service, the company continued with bus service to San Francisco, but sold it to Greyhound in 1942. A stretch of track north of St. Helena between Greystone and Barro was taken over by the Southern Pacific and used as a freight spur into the 1980s. The freight service to Mare Island Naval Shipyard remained as a subsidiary of the Sacramento Northern Railway until taken over by the Navy Department in 1956. In 1957 the company was dissolved.

== Mare Island Naval Shipyard ==
Electric locomotives served the shipyard from 1919 until the overhead electric lines became a hazard for cranes installed during wartime expansion. Two GE 44-ton switchers numbered 30 and 40 took over shipyard operations in April 1942, and were joined by number 50 in August 1943. Number 40 became Sacramento Northern Railway #141 when the shipyard resumed peacetime operations in 1946. The two remaining engines were replaced by similar models owned by the United States Navy in 1956. Number 30 became Sacramento Northern Railway #147 while number 50 became Petaluma and Santa Rosa Railroad #3.

== Artifacts ==
The railroad's former car barn located at Sixth Street and Soscol Avenue in Napa, built in 1907, is still extant.

Two former Napa Valley Route cars are preserved at the Western Railway Museum: steel combine car no. 63 and steel box motor no. 100. The body of a McKeen Motor Car Company trailer is located in St. Helena. Original built for the Southern Pacific Railroad in 1909, it saw light use on the SFN&C beginning in 1927.

== See also ==
- List of California street railroads
- List of interurban railways
- Rail transport in Solano County, California
