= Streetcars in Sacramento =

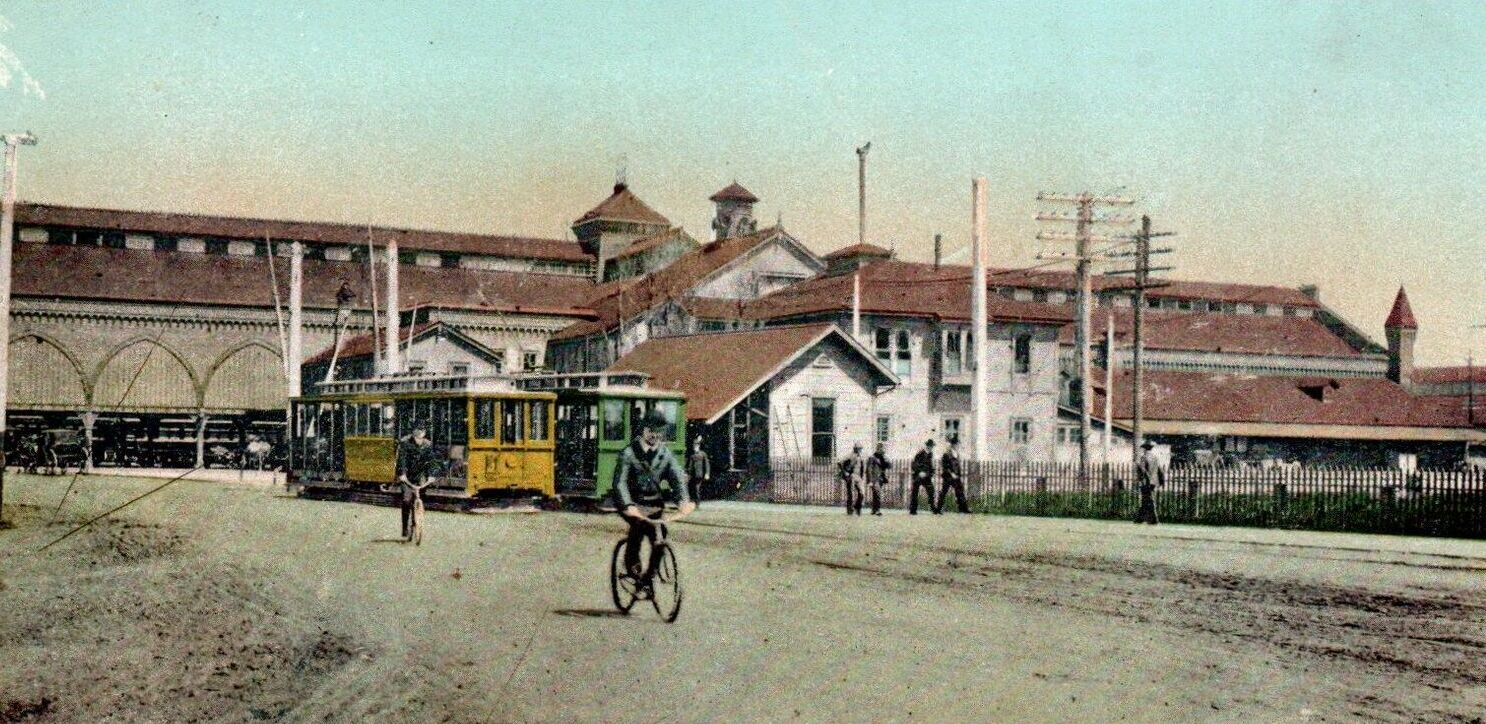
Sacramento Southern Pacific depot with streetcars halted in front, c. 1901–1907

The use of streetcars in Sacramento began with horse car lines built in the city in 1870. Several companies operated electric streetcars in the city after 1890 until operations were consolidated under Pacific Gas & Electric starting in 1906. Like most American cities, automobile adoption and deferred maintenance led to all streetcar lines being converted to buses by 1947. A second-generation light rail system began operations in 1987 as RT Metro, later rebranded as SacRT light rail, which includes street running segments similar to traditional streetcar operations.

== Horsecars ==
An early omnibus line operated between Third and R Streets to Second and K Streets from 1858 to 1862.

Horse railway service under the City Street Railway began on August 20, 1870; fares were 5¢. (Note: $1.27 in 2025 adjusted for inflation) Two extensions to the system opened in 1880: one fourteen blocks to the City Cemetery and one on Front Street to the Central Pacific Railroad station.

The Highland Park Railway began running in December 1887, running between Highland Park and 20th and O Streets.

== Electric traction ==
The Central Street Railway experimented with storage battery trams in 1888, though power densities were not found sufficient for sustained service. The company would establish the first trolley traction line in Sacramento around February 1891. Early cars suffered from noise issues, and new rolling stock was ordered only a month into running. The new traction method quickly expanded, with the Central Electric railway Company (successor to the Central Street Railway) acquiring even more rolling stock to meet demand. The operation would then go through several acquisitions, with the Sacramento Electric Power & Light Company taking over the line in 1892 and building the first long distance electric transmission line between Folsom Lake and Sacramento. This became the Sacramento Electric Gas & Railway Company in 1896, and the longstanding Pacific Gas & Electric Company in 1906. Two-man operation was eliminated when the final order of steel cars arrived in 1929.

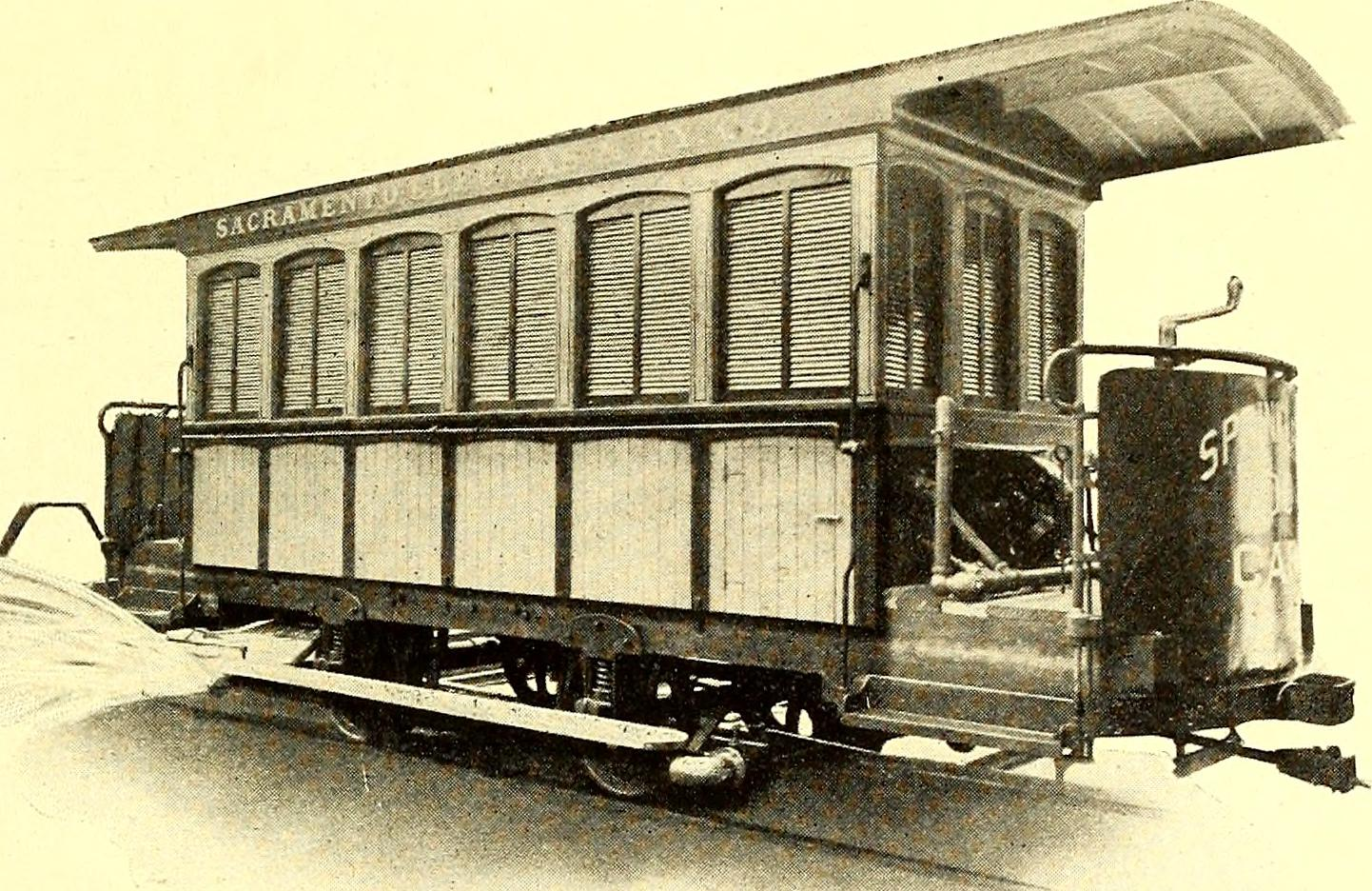
Sacramento Electric, Gas & Railway streetcar in a 1902 advertisement

Two additional companies entered the Sacramento market in the early 1900s via new interurban railways. The Northern Electric Railway began local service along C Street in 1907, with the Swanston branch opening in 1913. Suburban service was provided as far north as Elverta. Also in 1913, Sacramento Northern (Northern Electric's successor) would extend suburban service to West Sacramento, combining it with their Central California Traction Company would go on to build their line to Sacramento, which opened on September 1, 1910. It entered through the southeast part of the city, running along X Street to connect to the Sacramento Northern at 8th Street. Interurban services were consolidated at the Sacramento Union Traction Depot in 1925. These two companies would absolve themselves of their local streetcar operations after 1943 when operations were sold to PG&E, which combined the Sacramento Northern's C Street line and the CCT line into a single service.

Streetcar building was also established as an industry in Sacramento. The Sacramento Electric, Gas & Railway Company was established at 28th and N Streets and built rolling stock for local operations as well as for other California cities' street railways.

PG&E sold its street railway operations to Pacific City Lines, a subsidiary of National City Lines, on October 31, 1943 for $450,000. (Note: $8.37 million in 2025 adjusted for inflation) Gasoline rationing during World War II temporarily boosted ridership, but postwar declines quickly compounded. Bus substitutions had occurred on lines abandoned prior to the war, but The final day of streetcar service was January 4, 1947.

=== Pacific Gas & Electric lines ===
Number	Line	Last service	Route in 1932 (unless noted)
1	T Street	1939	McKinley Park via G, 7th, and T to 28th
2	J Street		SP depot via J, 28th, Sacramento Boulevard to James McClatchy Park
3	E-L	1946	SP depot via J and 46th to Elmhurst
4	M Street		SP depot via K and M to 28th
5	P Street	January 4, 1947	SP depot via K, 10th, P, 28th, Sacramento Boulevard, and 4th Avenue to the Fairgrounds
6	21st Street		SP depot via K, 21st, 5th Avenue to James McClatchy Park
7	10th Street	1939	10th and J running via 10th and Riverside to William Land Park
8	3rd and P		2nd and I via 3rd and P to 10th
9	3rd & T		2nd and I via 3rd and T to Southside Park
11	P Street		SP depot via K, 15th, P, 28th, and Sacramento Boulevard to James McClatchy Park
12	46th Street		SP depot via J to 46th
15			Route in 1945: C and Alhambra Boulevard via C, private right of way, D, 15th, I, 8th, X, Alhambra Boulevard, Sacramento Boulevard, 2nd Avenue, Stockton Boulevard, and a private reservation along 21st Street

=== Rolling stock ===
Pacific Gas and Electric began acquiring Birney safety cars in 1918. The two-truck Birneys purchased in 1929 are referred to as "Christmas cars". Sacramento Northern acquired their own Birneys in 1923, purchased from the San Diego Electric Railway. These were retired in 1939. When PG&E created the 15 line from former Central California Traction and Sacramento Northern tracks in 1943, it maintained CCT's St. Louis cars (themselves purchased from the Fresno Traction Company in 1938).

== Second generation light rail ==
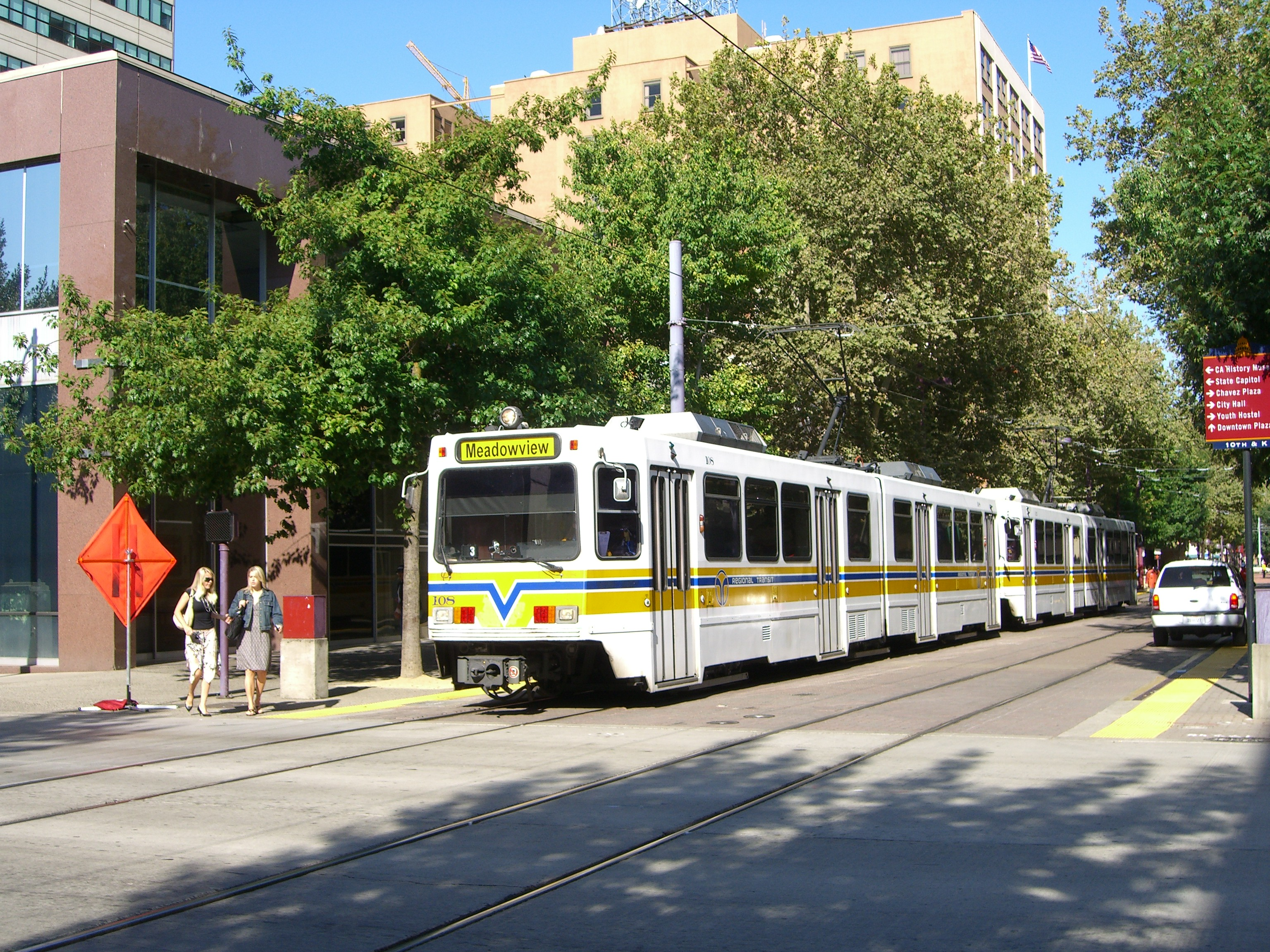
SacRT light rail returned local rail transit to Sacramento after a 40 year absence.

Light rail had emerged as a popular choice for medium-sized cities to expand their transit options in the 1980s, and Sacramento similarly planned a system which would include some street running segments downtown. The modern system runs on some corridors which were served by the first generation streetcar system, including 7th, 8th, and K Streets downtown as well as the former Sacramento Northern Swanston branch along Arden Way. Expansion of the light rail continues into 2025.

The Sacramento Streetcar was a proposed project intended to bring rail transportation to West Sacramento and tie into the existing RT light rail. Plans for the line stalled after 2019 when bids for construction came in significantly higher than anticipated.
