= Watsonville Traction Company =

Defunct railway in California

Watsonville Railway and Navigation Campany
Overview
- Headquarters: Watsonville, California
- Locale: California
- Dates of operation: 1904–1913
- Successor: abandoned

Technical
- Track gauge: 3 ft (914 mm)
- Length: 6 miles (9.7 km)

The Watsonville Traction Company or Watsonville Transportation Company was a 3 ft (914 mm) narrow gauge, interurban electrified railway in California.

== Origin ==
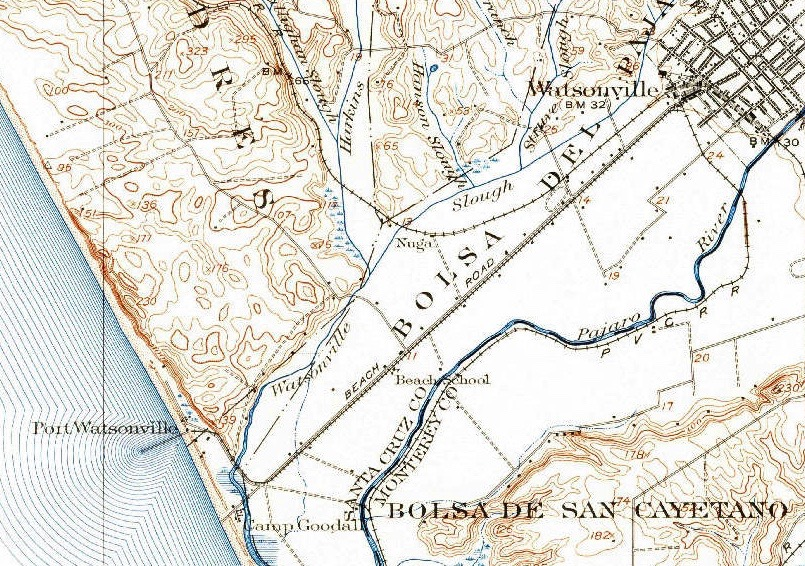
Route in 1912

At the turn of the century, the city of Watsonville felt it was surrounded by the monopoly of the Southern Pacific Railroad. The failures of previous railroads to the Southern Pacific meant that the city was embittered, believing that it was now up to the city's prominent local businessmen to push against the Southern Pacific.

With this, various local businessmen (headed by R.E. Eaton) proposed a new railroad between Watsonville and Monterey Bay, believing that if they could build a new seaport then they could secure more favorable rates for the local economy.

On February 13, 1903, the Watsonville Transportation Company was founded, as listed in their articles of incorporation, to "construct a single or double-track railroad of either narrow gauge or standard gauge, operated by steam engines, electrical power, gasoline motors, or any lawful means of power, from the City of Watsonville along any feasible route to Monterey Bay at an estimated distance of five miles." It was also decided upon to have the railroad support telephone and power lines along its route. Capital stock was issued at $200,000, with 200,000 shares being distributed largely in the local area.

The railroad named R.E. Eaton as President, F.A. Kilburn as Vice President and Treasurer, S. Scurich as Director, H.H. Main as Secretary (a position he also held in the Agricultural Park Association), and promoter of the railroad W.J. Rogers as General Manager.

== Construction and route ==
In the railroad's promoter's vision to link Watsonville with Monterey Bay, a site for a port was selected about six miles from the city at a point known as Port Rogers (named after General Manager W.J. Rogers). The location was selected because of its proximity and the fact that it was not owned by the Pacific Coast Steamship Company, who owned most of the coastal lands to Moss Landing. To operate out of this, the steam-schooner F.A. Kilburn was built.

The land between Port Rogers and Watsonville was fairly level, meaning that construction progressed fairly easily. For budget reasons, and for interchanging with the Pajaro Valley Consolidated Railroad, the railroad chose a three foot gauge for its route, which was to be electrified. The 6-mile (9.7 km) electric railway line ran from the intersection of Wall and Main Street in Watsonville, down the center of Wall to Beach Road, on the side of Beach to the beach where it used a S-Curve to access Port Rogers, where a timber wharf was constructed.

A power station, carbarn, and freight warehouse were built on Beach Road where the railway crossed the similarly narrow gauge Pajaro Valley Consolidated Railroad. There was little traffic at the interchange though, because the steam railroad served its own wharf at the safer Moss Landing. The electric railroad had two interurbans serving the dual purpose of carrying passengers and pulling some of the railroad's two boxcars and four flatcars.

Construction was largely completed around May of 1904, which coincided with the maiden voyage of the F.A. Kilburn. Originally, the railroad was to be extended east to Hollister and Gilroy, though a series of tragedies necessitated the use of said funds to go towards the repair of the wharf at Port Rogers.

== Watsonville Transportation Company ==
The 997-ton passenger-carrying steam schooner F.A.Kilburn was built by Hans Ditlev Bendixsen of Fairhaven, California, to operate as a produce packet between the wharf and San Francisco. Costing $125,000 it had a four-cylinder triple-expansion dynamic balance steam engine, which could generate 1200 horsepower. It could carry 45 people, who were allowed to roam on its upper deck, and had space in its hold for a significant amount of freight.

Kilburn's maiden voyage in May 1904 brought seventy passengers from San Francisco to meet the interurbans at Port Rogers. There was much cause for celebration, as the Transportation Company's promoters believed that "The moment the first steamship line leaves Watsonville, every chicken, every cow, and every acre of land to the Pajaro Valley will be worth more money". Regular scheduling had the Kilburn leave Port Rogers in the early evening to arrive in San Francisco the following morning in time for the early market, where it became known as the berry boat.

Within a few months of initiating service the wharf at Port Rogers required replacement of timbers damaged by teredo worms. When replaced, heavy seas damaged the wharf soon after the damaged timbers had been replaced with redwood. The total cost of repairs was $35,000, of which was covered by revenue in the first eight months, which was purported to be $36,250 in freight business and $13,750 in passenger revenue. The reason for this success laid in the fact that freight rates had been cut in half by the railroad in rivalry with the Southern Pacific, who sparked a rate war in response.

Although the railroad had found much success early on, a lawsuit affected the company gravely (eventually resulting in its first bankruptcy). Shareholders in the line believed that General Manager and Promoter W.J. Rogers had been trusted with too many shares for promotional reasons. The matter was brought to court and Rogers and Main were indicted for misappropriating funds and falsifying records. A series of other lawsuits launched by shareholders in response to the lawsuit, as well as a rate war with the Southern Pacific that lead to freight being shipped essentially for free, led to the company's declaration of bankruptcy on September 8, 1905.

== Watsonville Railway and Navigation Company ==
The company was reorganized as the Watsonville Railway and Navigation Company on April 22, 1911 with Port Rogers renamed Port Watsonville. The rolling stock was stored while service was discontinued through the bankruptcy proceedings, and one of the two streetcars had been destroyed by fire in 1909. The berry boat had run aground off Coos Bay while being operated in coastal trade by stockholder Fred Linderman, but was towed to North Bend, Oregon, to receive a new rudder and a patch for the holed hull. The railroad resumed operation with the streetcar and ten flatcars, which were often fitted with benches for carrying additional passengers to various entertainment events on Monterey Bay beaches. The company was unable to pay for repairs after a December 1912 storm destroyed 160 feet of the wharf; so operations ceased in October 1913. The repaired berry boat went through a series of owners before burning off American Shoal Light on June 14, 1918.
