= Second Street Cable Railway =

Streetcar railway in Los Angeles

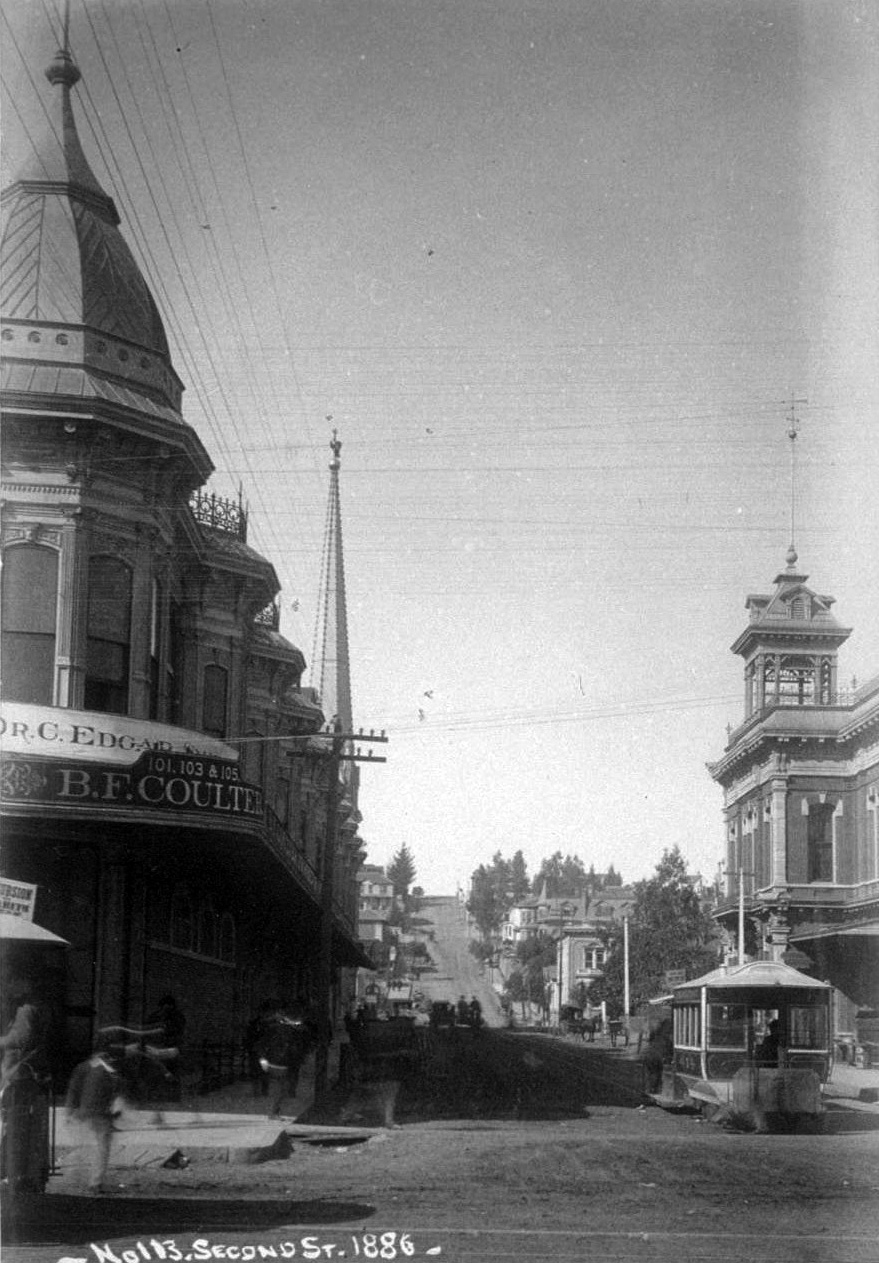
View west on 2nd at Spring, with a cable car of the 2nd St. Cable Railway. Coulter's in the Hollenbeck Block (left) when it was only two stories tall; 2nd City Hall (right), 1886

The Second Street Cable Railway was the first cable car system to open in Los Angeles. Opened in 1885, it ran from Second and Spring Streets to First Street and Belmont Avenue. The completed railway was 6,940 feet long, just over a mile and a quarter, with a power house constructed in the middle, at Boylston Street. It was a single track system, with sidings where a down-hill car could coast past an up-hill car. The route included the steepest gradient on any street railway in North America, a 27.7 degree hill along Second Street between Bunker Hill Avenue and Hope Street on Bunker Hill. The line opened to Texas Street on Oct 8, 1885.

The railway was created to encourage sales of property west of downtown Los Angeles, property in the area known as Crown Hill. Henry Witmer, E.A. Hall, and Jesse Yarnell, owners of the property, organized the Los Angeles Improvement Company to subdivide the property into 1400 lots and build the cable railway to connect it to downtown. Other backers included downtown businessmen such as Isaac W. Lord and John Hollenbeck, who owned property near the terminus of the line at Second and Spring Streets.

A beer garden resort, called City Park, was developed at the northeast corner of First and Lakeshore in order to draw more passengers to the line.

In January, 1888, James McLaughlin paid $130,000 for the line and the beer garden, something which turned out to be a most unfortunate decision.

By the spring of 1888 demand for lots had fallen off, but by then the Improvement Company had sold all but 52 of its lots. In addition, Hollenbeck had expanded his Hollenbeck Hotel at Second and Spring, Witmer and some associates had built the California Bank at the corner of Second and Fort Street (Broadway), and the city had built a new City Hall on Fort Street just south of Second Street.

The system was chronically plagued with damage to its cables and pulleys due to flooding. It had to be closed down for several days in the winter of 1888 because a replacement for a broken cable could not be delivered to the cable house through the muddy streets.

In March, 1889, an agreement was made with McLaughlin's Cahuenga Valley Railroad (built in conjunction with Ivar Weid), which served the new Colegrove area, located just south of Hollywood. The cable railway would exchange transfers at First and Belmont so that its patrons could travel from downtown all the way to Colegrove.

But in late summer, 1889, the Cahuenga Valley Railroad was prevented from operating within the Los Angeles city limits. On October 13, McLaughlin suspended cable operations ”indefinitely”. He applied for a permit to extend the road to Alvarado, but the council denied the permit. On December 24 of that year another flood caused further damage to the line, and it was abandoned in 1890. With its demise, the Second Street Cable Railway had the distinction of being the first cable railway in the United States to go out of business.

== Bibliography ==
- Comer, Virginia (1988). In Victorian Los Angeles: The Witmers of Crown Hill. Los Angeles, California: Talbot Press.
- Post, Robert C. (1989). Street Railways and the Growth of Los Angeles. San Marino, California: Golden West Books.
- Swett, Ira L. (1951). Los Angeles Railway: Interurbans Special No. 11. Los Angeles, California: Interurbans.
