= Piedmont Cable Company =

Former cable car railway in Oakland, California

The Piedmont Cable Company was a street railway company which operated in Oakland and Piedmont, California. It amalgamated several horsecar lines in the area and built two cable railway lines. It was absorbed into the Oakland Transit Company in 1897, becoming a component of the later Key System.

== History ==
The Broadway and Piedmont Railroad was established by Walter Blair as a horsecar line in 1876. It ran on its namesake streets to Mountain View Cemetery. A branch of the line which split at Pleasant Valley Avenue and ran through Blair's milk ranch to Vernal Avenue.

Simultaneous to the horsecar line to the cemeteries, an additional company, the Fourteenth Street Railroad, was established to build a line on that street. This was put into operation on February 26, 1877. It began at the 7th and Broadway terminal, running up to 14th Street and turning west to the then-city limits. The car barn was located at the corner of 14th and Peralta. The following year, the company sought to expand further west over 16th street to reach the newly built 16th Street depot. The company began converting to cable-haulage at the end of 1889, though, with only one block of new track laid over one week of work, the move may have been an attempt to block a competing company from accessing the street.

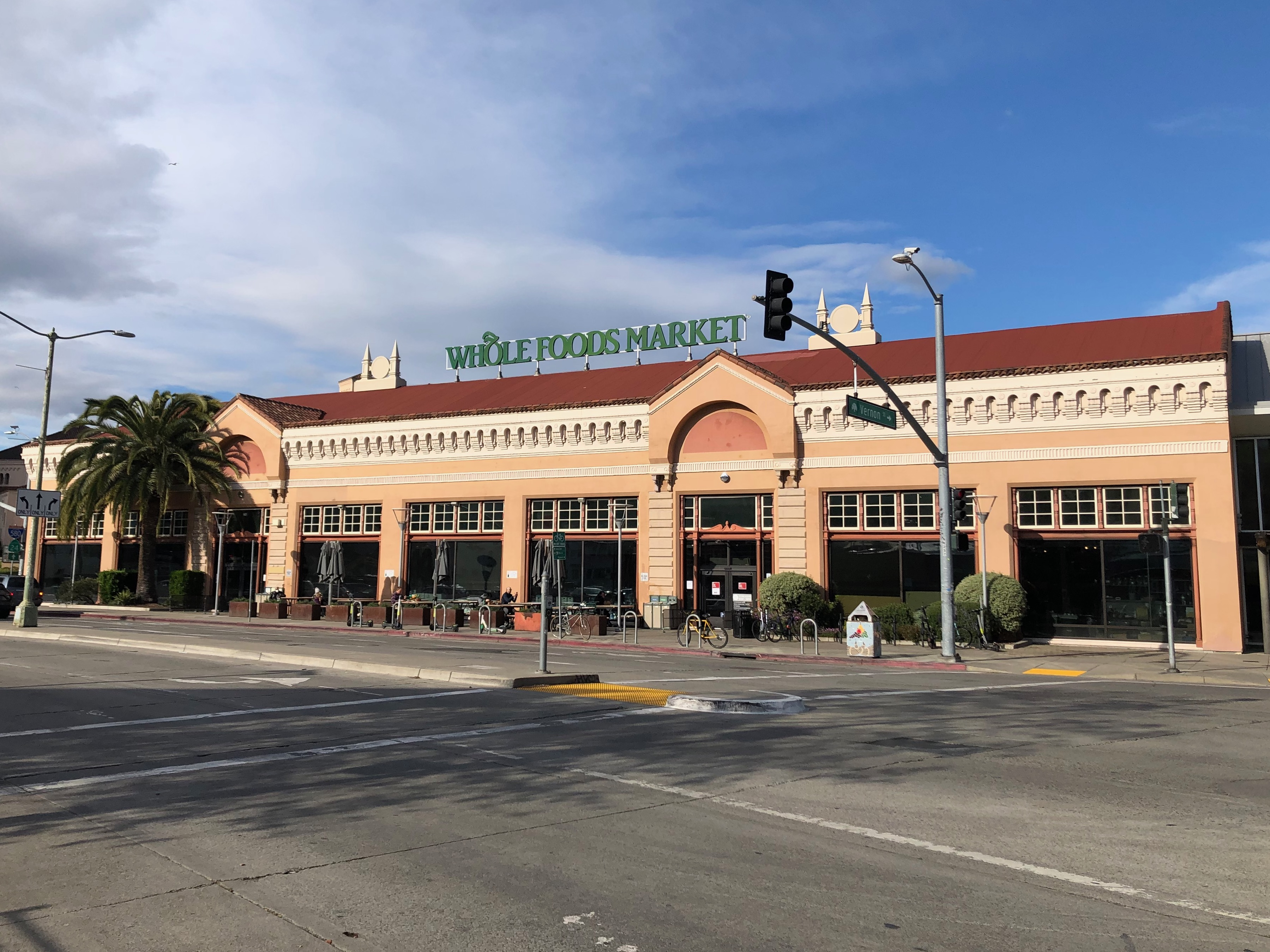
The Piedmont Cable power house and car barn was located at the corner of 24th and Harrison. After operations ended, the building was gutted and converted to the Cox Cadillac showroom. It was later redeveloped into a Whole Foods grocery store.

Following Blair's death, his same partners and his widow, Phoebe Blair, established the Piedmont Cable Company in 1889 with the aim to eventually construct three new cable lines. All of the Blair interests were amalgamated as the Consolidated Piedmont Cable Company the following year, and cable service on Oakland Avenue to Piedmont began on August 1, 1890. The old Piedmont Branch was discontinued the same day. This new route provided a 48-minute ride from San Francisco, nearly halving the previous time; the trip required a ferry, a transfer to the narrow gauge steam railroad, a further transfer to horsecar to the cable power house, then finally a ride on the cable road.

Work proceeded on the 16th Street line in late 1891. Upon learning of a new (potentially competing) Oakland Consolidated Street Railway line on Howe Street, workers were transferred to convert to cable-haulage the line up Piedmont Avenue from 24th Street to the Cemetery. The first day of cable service was on August 3, 1892, two months earlier than Oakland Consolidated's line.

The 14th Street line would go on to be converted from horse to electric traction, beginning service on November 2, 1892. Electricity was supplied from the cable barn.

The third cable line never materialized. The company would enter receivership in November 1893, as it had failed to make interest payments on its outstanding bonds. It was sold at auction for $82,000 in 1895, purchased by a representative of the company's bondholders.

The bondholders agreed to reincorporate the railway and receive company's shares as compensation, thus the Piedmont and Mountain View Railway was established soon after the auction. Under this management, the Piedmont line was converted to electric between 1895 and 1896, and the 14th Street line was extended to 7th and Washington. The company was taken over by Realty Syndicate in November 1897, becoming a component of the Oakland Transit Company. All cable routes were converted to electric by 1899.
