= Oakland Cable Railway =

The Oakland Cable Railway was a cable car line in Oakland and Emeryville, California. It was promoted by James G. Fair, who acquired the rights to the Oakland Railroad Company horsecar lines on San Pablo Avenue and Telegraph Avenue and converted tracks on San Pablo to cable operation. The line opened for service on November 19, 1886, running from 7th and Broadway to Emery via Broadway and San Pablo. The fare was reduced to 5¢ from the 25¢ that the horsecar line had charged (equivalent to $1.75 and $8.75 in 2024 after inflation), making the service instantly more popular and resulting in record returns from the line.

Fair would go on to sell his streetcar operations to the Southern Pacific Company, which would in turn transfer operations to their subsidiary: the Pacific Improvement Company. Tracks between 7th and Broadway were electrified in 1892. The San Pablo line was double tracked in 1896. Cable operations ceased after May 31, 1899, and the road was quickly rebuilt for electric traction, which began on July 3.

The cable power house was located at San Pablo and 22nd Street, which was converted to an electrical substation after cable operations ended.
