= Nevada County Traction Company =

Former interurban railway in California

Overview
- Founders: John Martin
- Locale: Nevada County, California

Technical
- Electrification: 550 V DC

The Nevada County Traction Company was an interurban electrified railway in Nevada County, part of the U.S. State of California in the United States of America. It connected Grass Valley and Nevada City, a total of about six miles (9.7 km) of track, using streetcar technology. Construction was in 1901; founder and promoter John Martin intended to build a system connecting the area to Sacramento, the state capital, but this was never seen through. Abandonment was in 1923.

== History ==
The Nevada County Traction Company began as an idea of its primary promoter: John Martin. He was the President of the Marysville Gas and Electric Company, and also had control over the power production of six California cities. Beginning in May of 1901 the railroad ties and rails had been ordered, and construction began a month later on June 6, 1901. On that date a groundbreaking ceremony took place, with the general manager of the railroad: G.H. Fairchild, promising that the railroad would be completed by September 9, 1901. After the railroad was completed there were rumors that the railroad would expand to the Bay Area, considering the relationship between the railroad's directors and their ownership of Gas and Electric companies throughout the state; These hopes however were never realized. The railroad would operate for over a decade before it was purchased alongside its competitor the Nevada County Narrow Gauge Railroad, by the California Midland Railroad, which was a subsidiary of the San Francisco and Northwestern Railway. Despite its purchase, the railroad continued to operate normally for several more years until 1923, when the railroad applied to the state railroad commission and asked for permission to abandon some tracks in Grass Valley. A snowstorm in early 1924 halted service and it was never restarted. In their application to the state railroad commission to convert operations to buses, the company cited increased automobile usage in the area as suppressing the demand for electricity necessary to run trains.

== Rolling stock ==
Nevada County Traction Company operated four streetcar-style J.Hammond Car Works units.
