= Oakland Railroad Company =

Horsecar rail operator in California, US

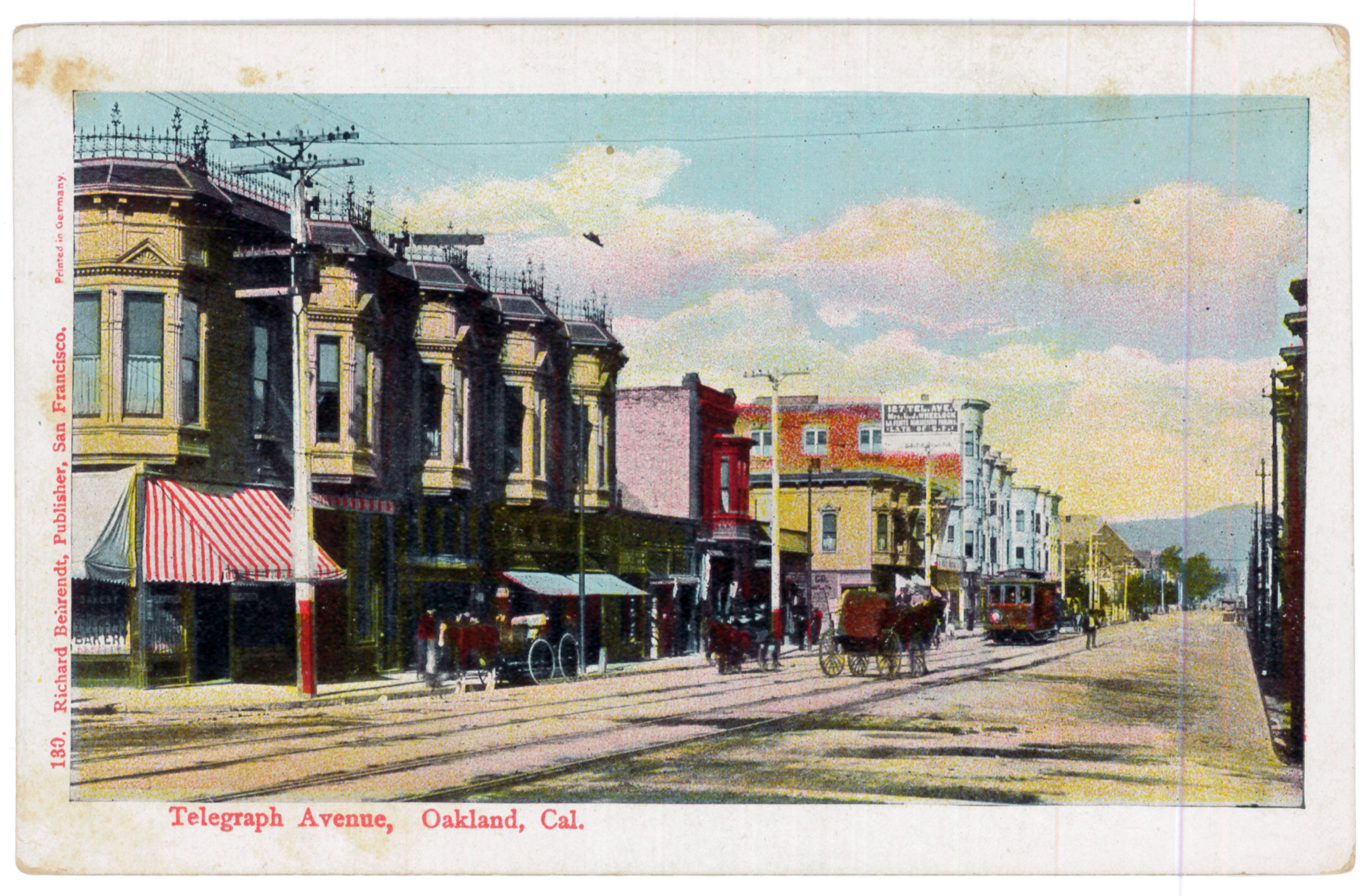
- A streetcar on Telegraph Avenue

Overview
- Locale: Oakland, California
- Dates of operation: 1869–1901
- Successor: Key System

Technical
- Track gauge: 4 ft 8 1/2 in (1,435 mm) standard gauge
- Length: 5.5 miles (8.9 km)

The Oakland Railroad Company operated the first horsecar railroad in Oakland, California. The company was incorporated in 1864 to offer transportation for students of private schools on Academy Hill (later known as Pill Hill). Service began in 1869 over strap iron rails laid on wooden stringers connected by wooden cross ties. The line initially ran along Broadway from First Street to Telegraph Road, and thence along Telegraph Avenue to the city limit at 36th Street. The line was extended to Temescal Creek in 1870 and to the University of California, Berkeley campus in 1873 for a total distance of 5.5 miles (8.9 km). By 1874 a stable of 51 horses was pulling 13 one-horse cars for normal runs and 6 two-horse cars used when larger numbers of passengers were expected. The large car barn and stable on 51st street was later converted to a supermarket. A round trip from Oakland to Temescal and return was scheduled to take one hour, and three such trips were a day's work for the horses while their drivers worked a 14-hour day, 7 days a week. A steam dummy replaced horses on one of the larger cars in 1875. The horsecar line on San Pablo Avenue was subsequently acquired by the company.

Comstock Lode silver baron James Graham Fair purchased the line in 1887 and converted some segments to the 3 ft (914 mm) narrow gauge of his connecting South Pacific Coast Railroad. Fair then sold the line to Southern Pacific's subsidiary Pacific Improvement Company, after his attempts to replace horses with steam locomotives were opposed by Oakland residents. Pacific Improvement Company electrified the line in 1892, with service beginning the following January simultaneously to the Lorin Branch down Alcatraz Avenue. The electrified line merged into the Key System predecessor Oakland Transit Company in 1901. The Telegraph Avenue rails were removed in 1954. The body of one of the original horse cars survived until 1948 as a playhouse for the children of a family on Delaware Street in Berkeley, and was subsequently donated to the California State Railroad Museum.

== See also ==
- Oakland Cable Railway
