= Streetcars in Santa Barbara, California =

System of street railways in California

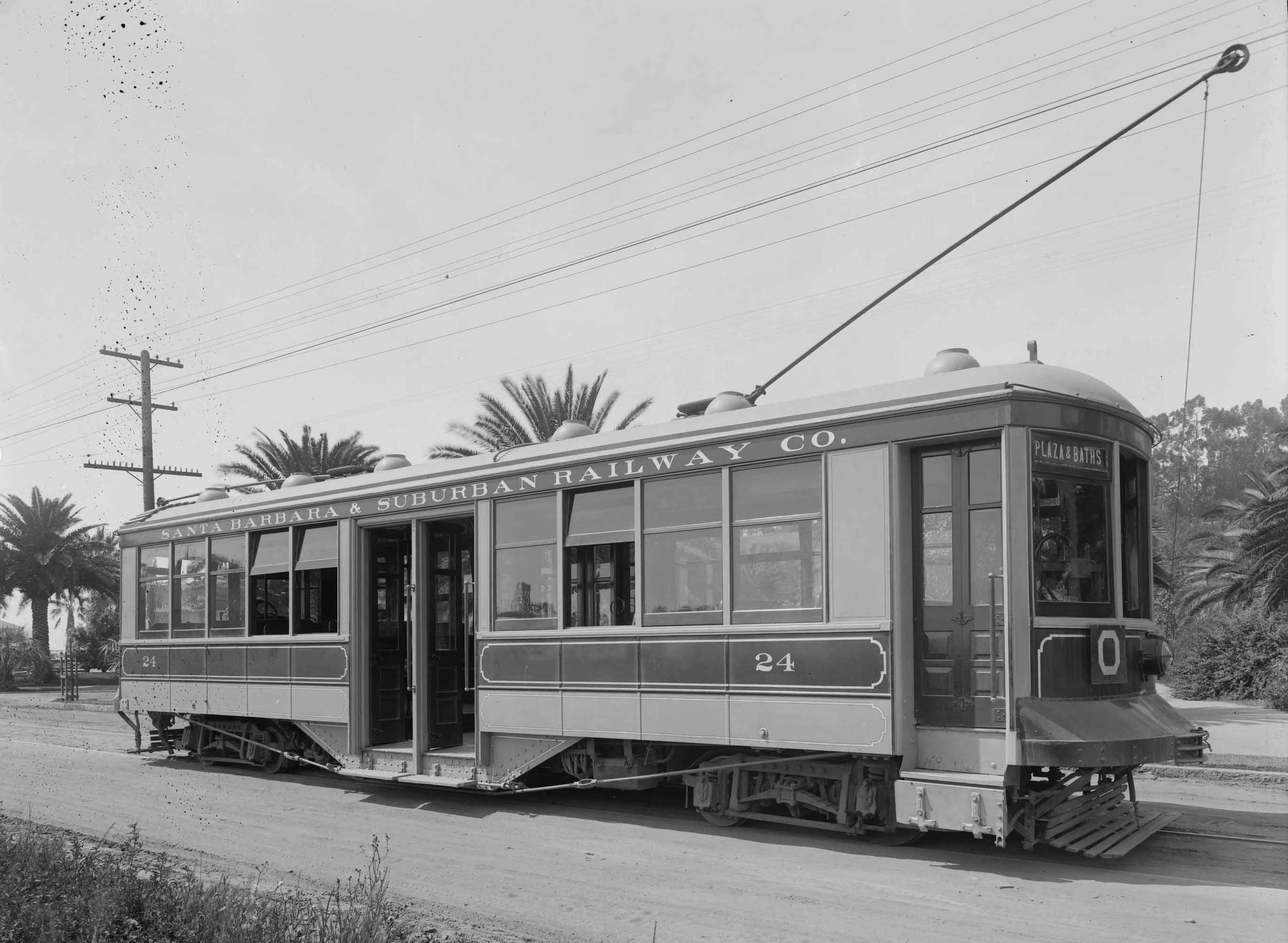
- A Santa Barbara streetcar in 1915

Overview
- Transit type: streetcar

Operation
- Began operation: 1875 (horsecars); October 1, 1896 (electric)
- Ended operation: ? (horsecars); June 30, 1929 (electric)

Santa Barbara, California, had a system of street railways that operated from 1875 through 1929. Begun as a single mule-drawn line from the waterfront pier to the Arlington Hotel, over the decades it was incrementally expanded, later electrified, and operated until its closure in June 1929.

== Santa Barbara Street Railway ==
The Santa Barbara Street Railway was opened in 1875 on State Street as a single line from the Santa Barbara waterfront to the Arlington Hotel at Victoria Street. Stearns Wharf had been completed three years prior in 1872 and the new streetcar line provided transportation from the wharf into the city. It had narrow gauge tracks and was drawn by mules.

== The Citizen's Railway Co. ==
The Citizen's Railway Co. was an expansion of the original mule-drawn system that opened after Santa Barbara was connected to the Southern Pacific route from Los Angeles in 1887. No longer accessible primarily by ship, Santa Barbara was now connected to other California cities by rail, resulting in a boom in tourism. The Citizen's Railway expansion added extensions northwest and northeast of the Arlington Hotel and west along the harbor into the growing city.

== Electrification ==
Electricity also arrived in Santa Barbara in 1887. In 1895, the Common Council began to consider soliciting bids for an electric streetcar franchise. Meanwhile, the Santa Barbara Street Railway continued its expansion, reaching the old Mission Santa Barbara, although it did not submit a bid for the electrical streetcar franchise. A group of Los Angeles businessmen calling themselves the Santa Barbara Consolidated Electric Co. submitted a proposal which was accepted by the council. Work began in October 1895. They laid new track and electrified lines, eventually reaching as far as Santa Barbara Cottage Hospital. The Common Council also later gave the mule-drawn lines permission to electrify, putting the companies in direct conflict over rights-of-way, especially on State Street. The conflict was resolved in September 1896 when the two companies merged. The first electrified line went into operation on October 1, 1896. After electrification, the mule-driven and electrical streetcars co-existed for a period of time until the system was fully electrified.

== Santa Barbara and Suburban Railway Co. ==
The streetcar system went through a variety of owners, name changes, and expansions, adding and extending lines and adding additional cars. However, by 1912 the company was losing money and the bondholders took over the company. With the blessing of Southern California Edison, two men approached the city of Santa Barbara with a plan to reorganize and modernize the system as the Santa Barbara and Suburban Railway Co.

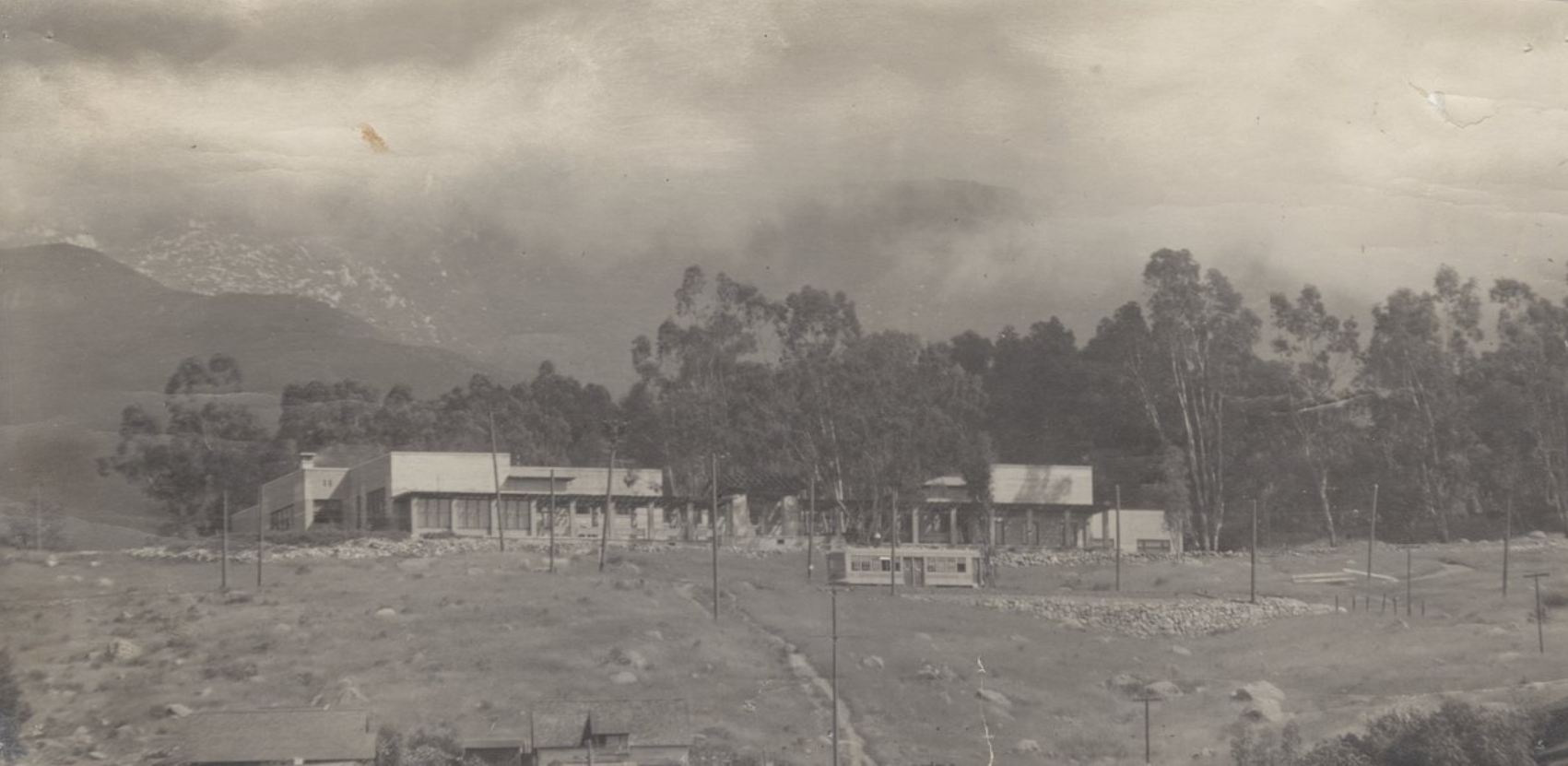
Santa Barbara and Suburban Railway Co. streetcar passing in front of the Normal School on the Santa Barbara Riviera.

Construction to replace the narrow gauge tracks with standard gauge tracks began in 1913. The Oak Park line was further extended into that neighborhood, the Haley Street line was extended to Milpas Street, and a new line to the Santa Barbara State Normal School of Manual Arts and Home Economics (the predecessor of the University of California, Santa Barbara) was built beyond the old Mission up a new right-of-way called Alameda Padre Serra. These lines further spurred the development of housing tracts in the Oak Park neighborhood as well as opened up the hilly Riviera around the Normal School to development. With the regauging came some of cut backs, though. The East Beach and West Victoria lines were discontinued.

The streetcar lines continued in competition with the automobile through the 1910s and 1920s. The company attempted to sell their operations in 1924, but were blocked by the city from doing so. After failing to pay its bills, the railway was transferred to Southern California Edison. After the 1925 Santa Barbara earthquake destroyed much of downtown, the streetcar system, though largely undamaged by the quake, was unable to recover and closed permanently on June 30, 1929.
