= Streetcars in Santa Cruz, California =

The history of streetcars in Santa Cruz spanned from 1875 to 1925. The city's tourist trade made it attractive as a place for developing streetcar suburbs. Horsecars gave way to electric propulsion in the decade of the 1900s, but deferred maintenance and the proliferation of automobile travel in the 1920s led to the system's replacement by buses.

== Horsecars ==
Horsecar service was established in Santa Cruz on August 3, 1875. Cars ran from the Lower Plaza to the beach. This would go on to become known as the "red line", after the cars red paint scheme which was inspired by the cherry orchards on Cherry Street (later East Chestnut Street). The Santa Cruz Railroad was connected to the tracks the following May 7, bringing a mixing of steam trains and horsecars on the same tracks. These operations were largely consolidated under one corporate identity until January 1877 when the City Railroad Company was spun off by its largest promoter, Frederick A. Hihn.

Competition to the red line came in 1877 with the Pacific Avenue Street Railroad Company, which was born out of a combination streetcar and steam railroad scheme similar to the City Railroad. The "yellow line" (after the color of the passenger cars) was in service that summer to the wharf. A promised extension to the beach opened on January 25, 1880. The line was extended again that spring after closing for grading work.

The red line had closed down in November 1879 due to city-required finishing work on the tracks, but was open again by the next May. The line closed again for the winter, but would not reopen. Tracks were taken up as the City Railroad Company was acquired by the Southern Pacific Railroad, who had no desire to run horsecar operations.

East Santa Cruz had experienced growth substantial enough to generate demand for better transportation options. The East Santa Cruz Street Railway was organized with community support, opening with a new bridge across the San Lorenzo River on May 1, 1890. The company went on to build a branch down Soquel Street to Twin Lakes, starting service on September 1, 1891.

There had been community pressure to extend the yellow line up Mission Hill, as the company had initially promoted. The company would improve their existing infrastructure rather than work on new line. This led the Pacific Avenue Street Railroad to lose its exclusivity on the streets upon which it operated. With any future expansion plans scuttled and facing declining business, the company was sold. It would be purchased by James Philip Smith, owner of a new electric railway, in 1892.

Even after electric traction began operating in Santa Cruz, the East Santa Cruz Street Railway ran horsecars. The panic of 1893 and slowed development in San Lorenzo reduced available funds. The company experimented with replacing horses with a steam dummy in 1895, even going so far as to place the new engine on every run starting July. Residents, however, objected to the new utility and horses were put back on the line in October. The steam dummy was utilized for only a few trips daily, and discontinued outright in 1899. Unable to generate enough revenue, the railroad was put up for sale in 1901.

One further horsecar operated in Santa Cruz after the major operations consolidated. Between October 1908 and July 1910, a line ran from the terminus of the West Street electric line up to Laveaga park. This would go on to be integrated into the main electric line.

== Electrification ==
By 1892, the city hosted three incompatible street railroads. The Pacific Avenue Street Railroad ran from the beach to the Pope House on 3 ft (914 mm) gauge rails. The East Santa Cruz Street Railway ran on 3 ft 6 in (1,067 mm) gauge rails from the junction of the Pacific Avenue line at the Lower Plaza to East Santa Cruz and Twin Lakes Park, running through the town of Seabright. Finally the new Santa Cruz, Garfield Park and Capitola Electric Railway had just begun operations on electrified rails.

Fred Swanton, general manager of the Santa Cruz Electric, Light and Power Company, had developed a successful lighting business and developed a friendship with James Philip Smith, another successful businessman who moved to Santa Cruz in 1890. They shared an interest in electric traction and believed the establishment of Garfield Park made necessary a line of street cars or some other transportation facilities between the park and the city. The steep ascent to be obtained forbade the use of horses, so the new road had to be operated by either cable or electric. After receiving favorable franchises from the city in June 1891, they incorporated the Santa Cruz, Garfield Park and Capitola Electric Railway three days later and began construction the following month on a route from Front and Minnesota via Walnut, Mission, Younglove, and Garfield Avenue. The rapid development of the electric road as well as the directly competing franchises led to decision of the Pacific Avenue Street Railroad management to sell out. A test of the new road and electric cars on November 1 was declared a success despite a derailment at Trescony Street. After a few weeks of adjustments, the road opened for regular service on November 25. The Pacific Avenue Street Railroad would go on to electrify its line the following year, but it shortly was absorbed into the Santa Cruz, Garfield Park and Capitola. The two companies merged as Santa Cruz Electric Railway.

Work progressed on rebuilding lines for electric traction, though unseasonable rains in early 1893 led to some new lines being temporarily laid with a dual gauge, allowing horsecars to provide service during construction. The beachfront line was completed in April along with a spur to the train depot. Following the crash of 1893 and the Santa Cruz fire the next year, some expansion plans were put on hold, though the beachfront line was extended to the San Lorenzo River in 1895. Swanton organized a new power company and built a dam to supply power to the electric railway. Some lines were abandoned in the late 1890s.

As Swanton and Smith diversified their investitures, they encountered new capital. A syndicate headed by John M. Gardiner and based in Los Angeles had recently begun consolidating utilities in Gilroy and Salinas, and even purchased the streetcar system of Monterey with plans to eventually form an electric railway running the length of the coast from San Francisco. Swanson had acquired the old East Santa Cruz Street Railway rights to run a line east to Capitola and sold his stake in the light company to participate. Thus a new entity, the Santa Cruz, Capitola and Watsonville Railway, was formed with a charter to run between those cities. Support for the line was strong until the company requested franchise rights to Pacific Avenue, which would bring it into direct competition with the Santa Cruz Electric. After attempting to dubiously ease the statutory franchising process, the company was taken to court to halt construction of the line, but were found compliant and allowed to build. Swanton and Smith's relationship at this time was unclear. The Santa Cruz Electric promptly improved service, with 15-minute headways, improved tracks, and reopening of lines which had previously closed.

The Santa Cruz, Capitola and Watsonville began service in June 1904, running from Soquel and Pacific Avenues to the beach, with the line to Twin Lakes opening two days later. Construction was ongoing at Capitola and the Arana Gulch branch. The company installed a switch on Pacific Avenue and tested it about 75 minutes after their restraining order was lifted on July 17 in regards to operating on the street. The Opal extension quickly followed, opening on July 25.

=== Union Traction Company ===
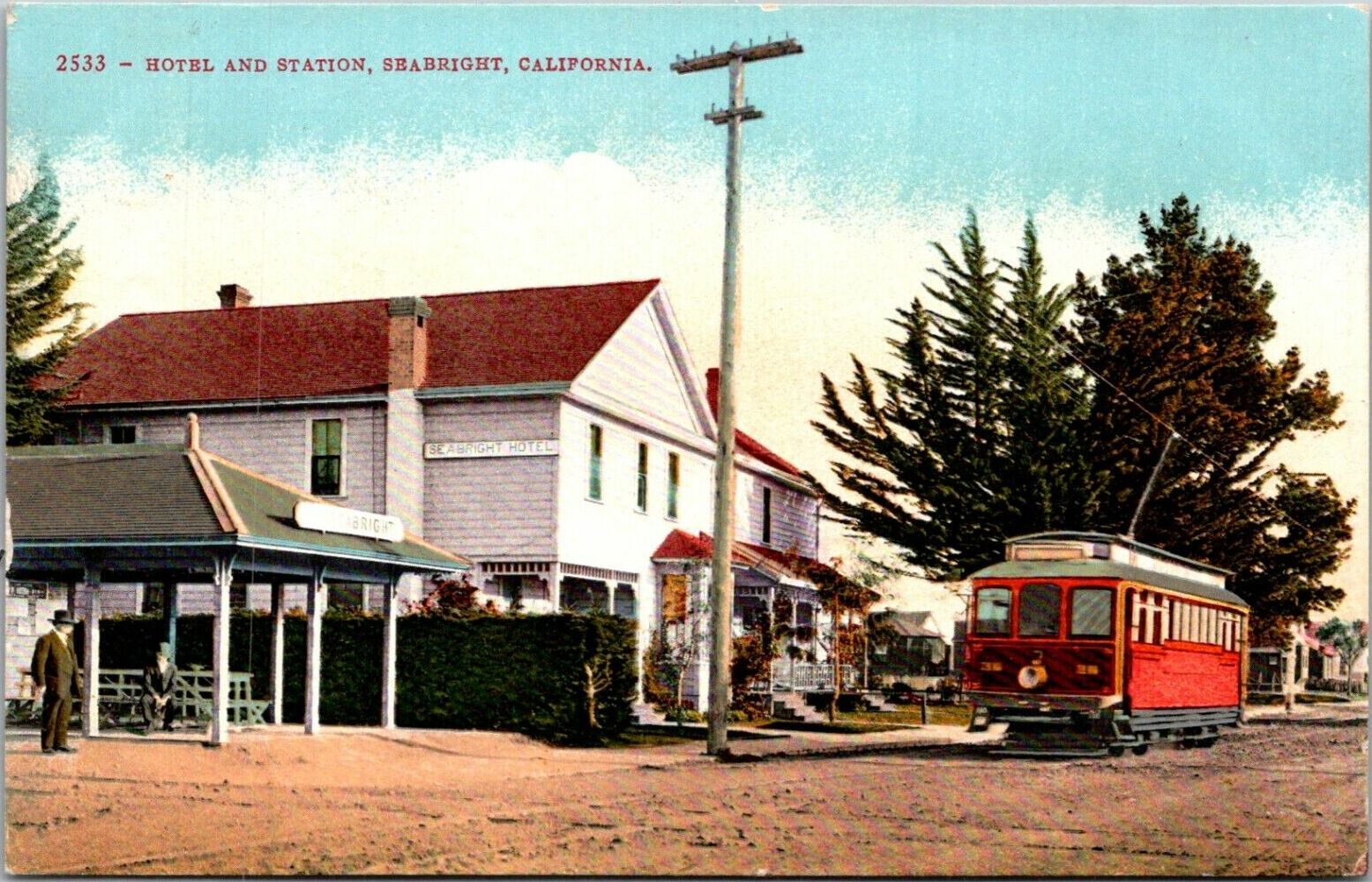
Divided back postcard of the Seabright Hotel, Seabright station, and a Union Traction Company streetcar, postmarked 1910

Several acquisitions and sales followed in quick succession. F.S. Granger, developer of the San Jose Los Gatos Interurban Company (eventual Peninsular Railway), moved to Santa Cruz in June 1904 and proceeded to acquire the Santa Cruz Electric. Simultaneously, the Union Traction Company of Santa Cruz was incorporated to take over both of the city's streetcar companies. October 4 was the first run to Capitola as well as the day the merger was announced. Granger fell out with the company and sold his shares.

Following a severe storm in January 1905, the company rebuilt several lines and constructed a new car barn on Pacific Avenue to house new rolling stock, all at a cost of $70,000. (Note: equivalent to $2.45 million in 2024 adjusted for inflation) It also discontinued some lines. Gardiner entered negotiation with Henry E. Huntington, head of Southern Pacific, as well as promoters of the planned electrified Ocean Shore Railway to establish the future of the streetcar system and potential interurban connections to the neighboring railroads, though these meetings did not yield promising results. With future expansion off the table, Gardiner and several other officers divested. The Ocean Shore would go on to purchase Union Traction, though the 1906 San Francisco Earthquake proved disastrous for the company. After payments to stockholders ceased, ownership of the streetcar operation was reverted to the previous owners. The Ocean Shore acquired a franchise for its own streetcar line in 1907, though never exorcised this plan.

New ownership brought new expansion plans with the reassurance of established headways and fares. Plans were unveiled to convert all tracks to standard gauge (from the old 3 ft 2 in (965 mm)) and to double track the system. Conversion on the beach line was completed in September 1907, the Vue de l'eau line later in the month, and the full Capitola line on November 14. All expansion plans were canceled following the panic of 1907 except the line to North Santa Cruz, which could be readily developed into a profitable streetcar suburb. The Water Street bridge was completed with cars running over it on October 4, 1908, eventually running to Martin Boulevard and a stub horsecar line.

The system's financials collapsed in 1918, with diminished ridership and poor farebox showings. Fares were raised to 6¢ (Note: equivalent to $1.25 in 2024 adjusted for inflation) (from the longtime cost of 5¢), some cars were converted to one-man operation, and staff was cut to reduce operating costs. Fare increases continued into the 1920s, though deferred maintenance set in and cash flow remained a problem for the railroad. The Laveaga Park line was discontinued and the Capitola line truncated on December 8, 1924 as new buses arrived. More bus conversions occurred that week. Attempts to abandon the Ocean Cliffs line were countered by the city with an ultimatum to either pave the streets on which the current lines operated or discontinue all service outright. Union Traction elected to end service. The last streetcar ran just after midnight on January 15, 1925, and buses took over the following morning.

== Remnants ==
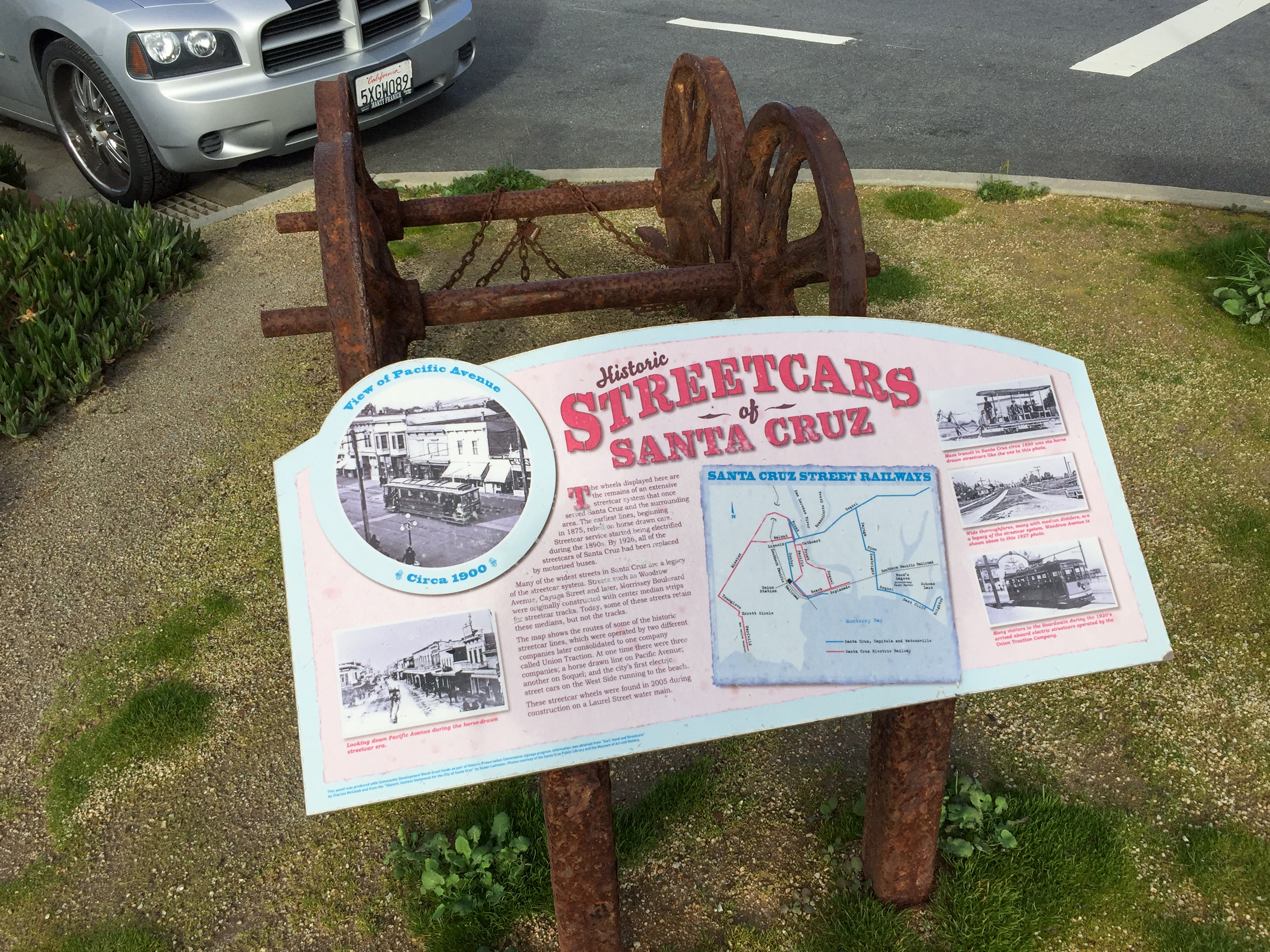
A plaque detailing the history of streetcars in Santa Cruz. An old set of streetcar wheels lie just behind the plaque.

Santa Clara Valley Transportation Authority Heritage Trolley #1 is a streetcar formerly in service in Santa Cruz. The car was built by and acquired from Pacific Gas and Electric in Sacramento, beginning operation in Santa Cruz in 1906. The fate of much of the narrow-gauge electric rolling stock is unknown.

The Santa Cruz Metropolitan Transit District is directly descendant from the original services which were operated during the streetcar era.

Some parts of Soquel Avenue have a distinctly humped center, which is the result of uneven grading done by the East Santa Cruz Street Railway in the late 1880s. This was noticeable into the 2020s.

Pilings from the Twin Lakes trestle were sill visible in the sand near Schwan Lagoon in the 2000s.
