= Taken for a Ride =

American documentary (1996)

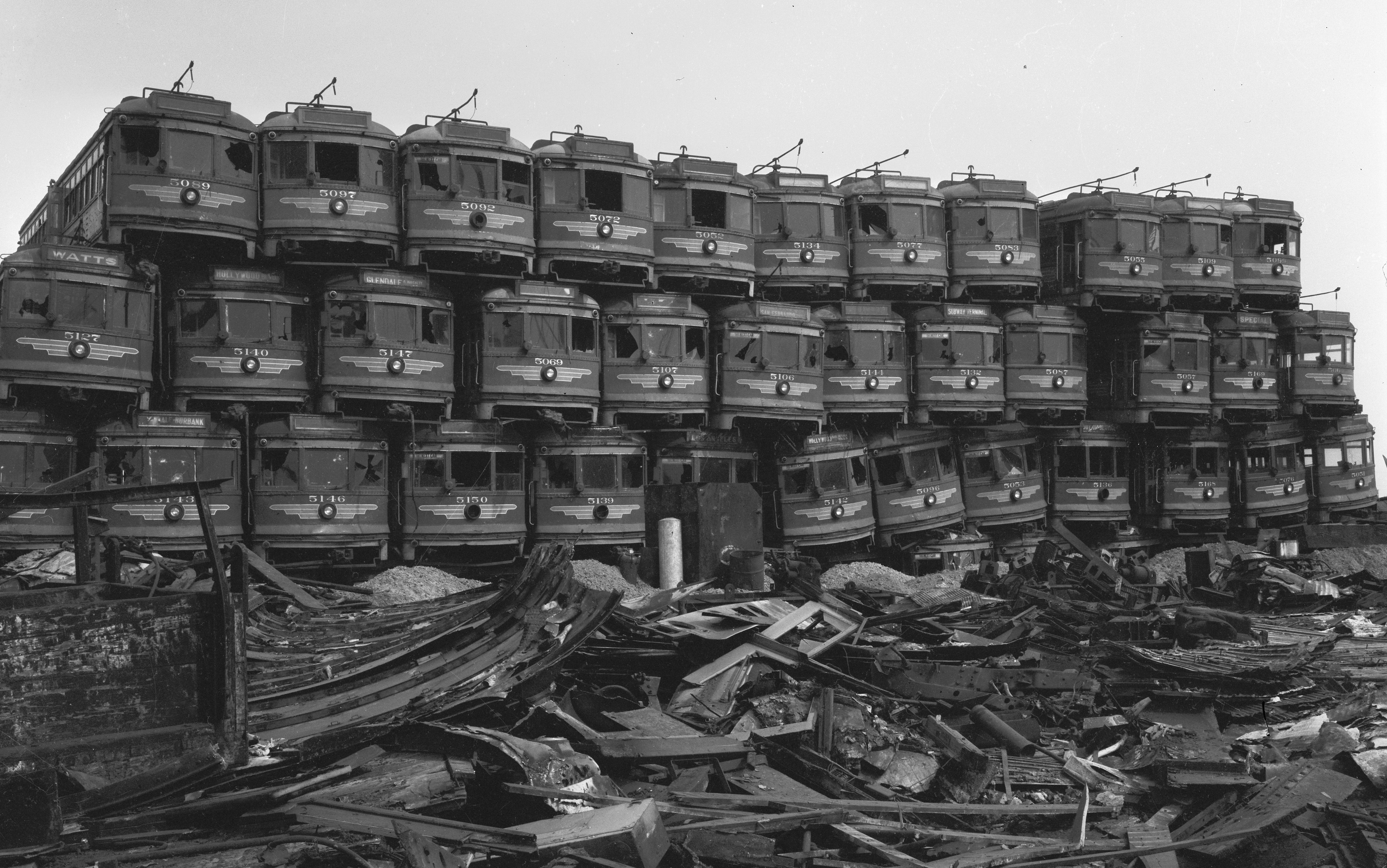
- Directed by: Jim Klein
- Narrated by: Jim Klein; Renée Montagne
- Distributed by: New Day Films
- Release date: 1996
- Running time: 55 minutes
- Country: United States
- Language: English

Taken for a Ride is a documentary film by Martha Olson and Jim Klein about the Great American Streetcar Scandal. The 55-minute film was first broadcast on August 6, 1996 on the PBS television series POV.

== Synopsis ==
Taken for a Ride begins with interviews on the inefficiencies and congestion on Los Angeles' highways. Next, the film displays a variety of archival footage on streetcar systems around the United States, asserting that streetcars were a widespread and efficient means of transportation. The film continues into a description of the General Motors streetcar conspiracy, starting with a history of National City Lines and Pacific City Lines and General Motors' investment in both companies. The film builds the argument that streetcar systems purchased by these companies were deliberately sabotaged through service reductions and fare increases, then replaced with less convenient but more profitable bus systems. Next, the film makes a connection between this conspiracy and the construction of the Interstate Highway System and the suburbanization of America in the face of the highway revolts in the 1960s and 1970s. The film ends with footage of the reduction of Philadelphia's trolleybus system at the time of filming.

== Analysis ==
Academic Sara Sullivan gave the film a mixed rating in her 2010 review: "(Taken for a Ride) presents a compelling history of the streetcars and the battles over freeways in the 1970s," but that the film "feels incomplete, with certain aspects needing to be fleshed out and other links made."
