= Dan Neil (journalist) =

American journalist (born 1960)

- Born: January 12, 1960 (age 66); Harrisburg, Pennsylvania
- Education: East Carolina University (BA); North Carolina State University (MA)
- Occupation: Writer
- Writing career
- Genre: Automotive journalism

Dan Neil is an American journalist, widely known an automotive columnist for The Wall Street Journal and a former staff writer at the Los Angeles Times, AutoWeek and Car and Driver. He was a panelist on 2011's The Car Show with Adam Carolla on Speed Channel.

In 1999, Neil received the International Motor Press Association's Ken Purdy Award for automotive journalism, and in 2004 Neil won the Pulitzer Prize for Criticism, presented annually to a newspaper writer who has demonstrated 'distinguished criticism.' Awarded for his LA Times column Rumble Seat, the Pulitzer board noted Neil's "one-of-a-kind reviews of automobiles, blending technical expertise with offbeat humor and astute cultural criticism."

Journalist Brooke Gladstone called Neil "the Oscar Wilde of auto reviewers." Freelance automotive journalist Thomas Bey called Neil "the thinking man's smart ass."

== Background ==
Neil was born in Harrisburg, Pennsylvania, on January 12, 1960, and moved to New Bern, North Carolina, at age 4. His father was an engineer with Stanley Powertools and his mother was a private investigator. He received a B.A. degree in Creative Writing from East Carolina University and an M.A. degree in English Literature from North Carolina State University.

Neil is married to Tina Larsen Neil and has twin daughters, Rosalind and Vivienne — as well as a son, Henry (Hank) Neil, from his first marriage. After four years of trying to get pregnant and several in-vitro fertilization procedures, Neil's wife conceived four embryos in a high risk, "white knuckle pregnancy." Facing further complications, he and his wife chose to abort two of the fetuses. Neil wrote about the experience for the LA Times.

Neil lived in Los Angeles before moving again to North Carolina, when he left the L.A. Times and began writing for The Wall Street Journal.

== Early career ==
Neil began his professional writing career with the Spectator, a local free weekly, and began working for The News & Observer of Raleigh, North Carolina as an obituary writer in 1985.

In interviews he has said his goals at the time were to "learn to write and see the world." Neil was recruited by AutoWeek magazine in 1994 as a senior contributing editor. In 1995, he began contributing reviews to The New York Times, which he continued until 2003.

Beginning with his work at The News & Observer, Neil developed his writing style, combining humor with pragmatic insight, literary analogies and personal experience. Neil worked with the Raleigh paper until 1996, when he was fired. He subsequently worked as a free-lance journalist, including five years as contributing editor to Car and Driver. In 1999 Neil was named senior contributing editor for travel magazine Expedia Travels, a post he held through 2001.

In 1999, Neil won the Ken Purdy Award for Excellence in Automotive Journalism, from the International Motor Press Association. In 2002, his work was selected for Houghton Mifflin's Best American Sports Writing.

=== Firing from the News & Observer ===
In 1991, Dan Neil had been moved from the newsroom of the News & Observer to the classified advertising department with the expectation "that he would write dealer-friendly pieces to attract readers to the newspaper's automobile classified section." In contrast to the newsroom, where Neil had worked with editors, he noticed his copy was no longer edited. "For seven years, I had unfettered access to 200,000 readers." Neil's writing eventually reflected the lack of constraint.

Neil's January 1996 review of the Ford Expedition described a back-seat encounter with his girlfriend, writing "this was loving, consensual and — given the Expedition's dual airbags, side impact beams and standard four-wheel anti-lock brakes — safe sex." The News and Observer reported Neil's recollection of the column in an interview years later:

"I wrote at some point about the kids getting into the Ford Expedition and commenting on the 'footprints' on the windshield. Well, that was just it! People went crazy! It was kind of like Janet Jackson's costume malfunction -- a none too daring transgression, overall, but the thing that finally sent people over the edge."

Put on probation for the article, Neil was instructed to have his articles reviewed by an editor as well as the director of classified auto advertising. Refusing, he was subsequently fired, and wrote in a later Independent Weekly article that he was fired "for refusing to have my column vetted by the classified advertising department."

Editors from The News & Observer contended that it was disingenuous to suggest that advertisers pressured the paper into firing Neil, since Neil worked for an advertorial section of the advertising department at the time.

The incident highlighted the growing issue that newspapers, under economic pressure, have in maintaining the virtual wall between the "church" of news gathering and the "state" of advertising sales, sometimes known as a Chinese wall. Notably, Keith Bradsher — author of a book about SUV's called High and Mighty — indicated that among critics, "auto reviewers are the most likely to be compromised by the industry they cover." Speaking in a 2005 radio interview with Brooke Gladstone, after receiving the Pulitzer Prize, Neil described the symbiotic relationship between the automobile industry and its critics:

"The entire environment is incestuous. They introduce new cars. They fly journalists in and put them up at really nice hotels and, you know, treat them to experiences that they would never possibly in a million years — they wouldn't even be allowed in these hotels ordinarily. You know, and that's not supposed to affect their judgment. But it is a compromised business, and it is also true that newspapers are under a great deal of revenue pressure on this score, and so yeah, a favorable editorial/advertorial content is often created to satisfy that need."

== LA Times ==
In September 2003, Neil became a full-time columnist for the Los Angeles Times and gained a following for his approach to automotive writing, which routinely included industry criticism — including criticism of automakers themselves and government emissions and safety policies.

In February 2005, he began writing 800 Words, a column about pop culture, for the Los Angeles Times Magazine. The column was syndicated by Tribune Media in 2006. Neil won the American Association of Sunday and Feature Editors award for best general commentary column in 2007.

800 Words was discontinued in 2008 after the Los Angeles Times Magazine was transferred from the editorial department to the paper's business division — and advertiser control.

In February 2010, Neil left the L.A. Times and accepted a position at The Wall Street Journal.

=== 2008 Zell lawsuit ===
In 2008, Neil participated in a federal class action suit against Sam Zell, who in 2007 purchased the Tribune Company, owner of the Los Angeles Times.

After the takeover, Zell rated reporters by how many column inches they produced, relinquished the Los Angeles Times Magazine and other editorial publications to advertiser control — and laid off at least 1,000 employees.

Neil called Zell "a corporate raider," adding "he's not a publisher. Newspapers are too important to the public to be treated as just pieces on a financial chessboard." Neil and a group of Times employees claimed violations of the Employee Retirement Income Security Act (ERISA) and alleged that Zell breached his duty of loyalty to Tribune's employees.

Forbes described the suit as putting "the fast-changing newspaper business on trial," noting "newspapers have been under siege since the technology bubble popped in the late 1990s, with problems ranging from declining circulation, advertiser consolidation, classified ads migrating online, rising newsprint costs, bloated debt structures and, yes, over-staffing. Not to mention the rise of Internet news."
