= Clarence Ditlow =

American consumer advocate

- Born: January 26, 1944; Louisville, Georgia
- Died: November 11, 2016 (aged 72); Washington, DC
- Education: Lehigh University (BA); Georgetown University Law Center (JD); Harvard Law School (LLM)

Clarence Mintzer Ditlow III (January 26, 1944 – November 11, 2016) was an American consumer advocate, primarily focusing on automotive safety. He was closely associated with Ralph Nader's organizations, and has been given credit for helping to instigate several critical safety changes within the auto industry.

== Biography ==
Ditlow III was born on January 26, 1944, to Clarence M. Ditlow Jr. and Myrtice (Lamb) Ditlow in Louisville, Georgia, and was raised in Camp Hill, Pennsylvania. His father was employed by a Chevrolet dealership as a service manager, in nearby Harrisburg.

Ditlow was educated as both an engineer and as a lawyer. He attended Lehigh University where he was on the wrestling team. He completed his undergraduate work in 1965 with a bachelor's degree in chemical engineering. Out of college he was employed by the US Patent Office for five years as a patent examiner. During this time period he joined "Nader's Raiders" as a volunteer. Continuing his education, he earned a Juris Doctor degree from Georgetown University in 1970 and a master's degree in environmental law from Harvard University the next year. He was mentored by Ralph Nader at the beginning of his career, beginning his association in 1971 with such groups as the U.S. Public Interest Research Group as a lawyer. In 1976 he became executive director of the Center for Auto Safety, a position he held for more than forty years until his death. Under Ditlow, the Center played a role in the recall of 6.7 million Chevrolets for defective engine mounts, 15 million Firestone 500 tires, 1.5 million Ford Pintos for exploding gas tanks, and 3 million Evenflo child seats for defective latches.

He met Marilyn Herman in 1979 and she eventually became his wife; they married on October 22, 2016. He battled cancer for the last year of his life, but continued his advocacy work, giving testimony regarding autonomous vehicle safety to the National Highway Traffic Safety Administration. Ditlow died of colon cancer on November 11, 2016, at the George Washington University Hospital in Washington, DC.

== Advocacy and impact ==
Ditlow never achieved the high public profile acquired by his mentor, Ralph Nader, but it was Ditlow who saw to completion many of the consumer advocacy issues that Nader brought to public attention. Joan Claybrook convinced Nader to hire Ditlow. Claybrook noted that Ditlow was formerly a competitive wrestler, and wanted the tenacity she thought his background would bring. Ditlow's skills as an investigator were crucial to long examinations, and he brought well-researched technical documentation to support claims made by Nader's organizations, claims which sometimes seemed outlandish at the time.

Among the earliest work by Ditlow was the advancement of automobile lemon laws. In the mid 1970s Ditlow was involved in the Ford Pinto rear collision controversy. In 1978 Ditlow began investigation into steel-belted radial tire failures at Firestone. While the company argued before the National Highway Traffic Safety Administration that the failures were a result of improper inflation by consumers, Ditlow counter-argued that the tires were being replaced on a 1:13 ratio, indicating a serious manufacturing issue. Further investigation resulted in a replacement of 8.6 million tires, which was a primary factor in the company's financial struggles.

As airbag research proved to save lives, Ditlow pushed to make the equipment a mandatory feature. He began the airbag initiative in the 1980s, and it became law in 1994. In the mid-1990s, he worked to bring notice to the General Motors sidesaddle gas tank issue. His work led to the recall of millions of Toyota vehicles in the latter part of the decade of the 2000s and the 2013 Takata airbag recalls. His activity was not only directed at companies, but he worked to regulate potentially harmful consumer activities such as texting while driving.

He was criticized by some regulators because of his close ties to product liability lawyers and for over-burdening regulators with concerns that proved to not always be correct. General Motors prevailed in a lawsuit resulting in awards and fines of more than $500,000, claiming Ditlow and the Center for Auto Safety had libeled and slandered the company. (Nevertheless, Chevrolet was his vehicle of choice.)

From 1978 until 2011 he was on the Board of Directors at Consumers Union. He was active with Friends of the Earth and, not limited to activity in the United States, was on the board of the Canadian organization Automobile Protection Association.

National Highway Traffic Safety Administration administrator Mark Rosekind credited Ditlow with making life safer for millions of Americans. Ed Markey and Richard Blumenthal stated in the September 29, 2016 Congressional Record that Ditlow's "work has resulted in better government oversight of automakers, the installation of key safety features and the exposure of safety defects in millions of cars, SUVs and other trucks."
