= Small—On Safety =

1972 book

Small—On Safety: The Designed-In Dangers of the Volkswagen
- Author: Center for Auto Safety
- Language: English
- Subject: Safety of Volkswagen vehicles
- Published: United States
- Publisher: Grossman Publishers
- Publication date: September 11, 1972
- Media type: Nonfiction book

Small—On Safety: The Designed-In Dangers of the Volkswagen is a nonfiction book written by the Center for Auto Safety, with an introduction by Ralph Nader. The book looks at the deficiencies in the safety aspects of the vehicles sold by Volkswagen. It was published on September 11, 1972, by Grossman Publishers. The book is based on a study released in September 1971 by the Center entitled The Volkswagen: An Assessment of Distinctive Hazards. The book concluded that "the Volkswagen Beetle is the most hazardous car currently in use in significant numbers in the United States" and that "the VW microbus or van is so unsafe that it should be removed from the roads entirely."

== Background ==
Unsafe at Any Speed: The Designed-In Dangers of the American Automobile, written by Ralph Nader, was published in 1965 and became a best seller. The book was instrumental in the passage of the National Traffic and Motor Vehicle Safety Act in 1966. The Center for Auto Safety was founded in 1970 by Ralph Nader and Consumers Union to continue his work in studying and advocating for automobile safety. The findings from the Center's study on the Volkswagen were not based on any independent testing by the Center but instead were based on tests by other organizations. These included Consumers Union and Cornell Aeronautical Laboratory's Automotive Crash Injury Research Center. The study also looked at complaints by owners and litigation involving accidents.

== Findings ==
The study urged the recall of all Volkswagen vehicles to correct safety defects. Defects noted in all Volkswagens included: faulty door latches, a poorly designed fuel system and gas filler cap, a swing axle suspension combined with the rear engine that caused hazardous handling, weak seatbacks, sensitivity to side winds, and side impact vulnerability. Additional defects noted in the VW bus included poor acceleration, inadequate protection in front end crashes, and frequent horn failure.

== Responses ==
In response to the 1971 study, Volkswagen said that the cars "meet or exceed all safety standards."

The most detailed response to the 1971 study was by Road & Track magazine. In its April 1972 edition, they published an article entitled "Ralph Nader vs. Volkswagen", and subtitled "An evaluation of 'The Volkswagen: An Assessment of Distinctive Hazards". The article was written by John Tomerlin, a writer of novels and television scripts. He was also a sports car enthusiast who wrote for Road & Track and Car & Driver magazines. The article concluded that "Ralph Nader [should] observe the 'ethical imperative' to recall the VW Report and publicly retract its inaccuracies."

== Effect on federal legislation ==
The book was most notably featured in hearings held by the United States Senate on requiring auto manufacturers to provide free repairs on mandatory recalls. At that time, the auto manufacturers often required repair costs on the recalls be paid by the car owners. The hearing notably mentioned a recall on 3.7 million Volkswagens for defective windshield wiper systems. Volkswagen had required that the owners pay for the repairs. The hearing included excerpts from Small—On Safety, the Road & Track response, and various correspondence between the Center for Auto Safety and Road & Track.
