= General Motors streetcar conspiracy =

Alleged conspiracy by GM and others to replace streetcar lines with buses

- Cadillac Place, the GM headquarters building as seen in 1981
- Date: 1938–1950
- Location: United States
- Accused: General Motors; Firestone; Standard Oil of California; Phillips Petroleum; Mack Trucks
- Charges: Violation of the Sherman Antitrust Act
- Verdict: GM fined $5,000

The General Motors streetcar conspiracy refers to the convictions of General Motors (GM) and related companies that were involved in the monopolizing of the sale of buses and supplies to National City Lines (NCL) and subsidiaries, as well as to the allegations that the defendants conspired to own or control transit systems, in violation of Section 1 of the Sherman Antitrust Act. This suit created lingering suspicions that the defendants had in fact plotted to dismantle streetcar systems in many cities in the United States as an attempt to monopolize surface transportation.

Between 1938 and 1950, National City Lines and its subsidiaries, American City Lines and Pacific City Lines—with investment from GM, Firestone Tire, Standard Oil of California (through a subsidiary), Federal Engineering, Phillips Petroleum, and Mack Trucks—gained control of additional transit systems in about 25 cities. (Note: Some put the number as high as 100, but reliable sources suggest that National had already acquired 20 city systems and two interurbans by the end of 1937, and these should be subtracted from the 46 systems mentioned in the case, and adjusted to reflect the splitting of the Elgin-Aurora line into two systems.) Systems included St. Louis, Baltimore, Los Angeles, and Oakland. NCL often converted streetcars to bus operations in that period, although electric traction was preserved or expanded in some locations. Other systems, such as San Diego's, were converted by outgrowths of the City Lines. Most of the companies involved were convicted in 1949 of conspiracy to monopolize interstate commerce in the sale of buses, fuel, and supplies to NCL subsidiaries, but were acquitted of conspiring to monopolize the transit industry.

== History ==
=== Background ===
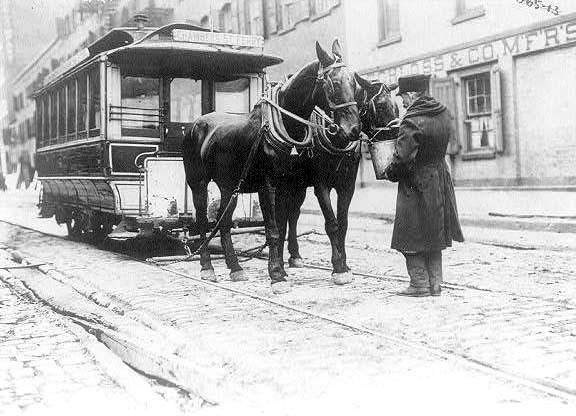
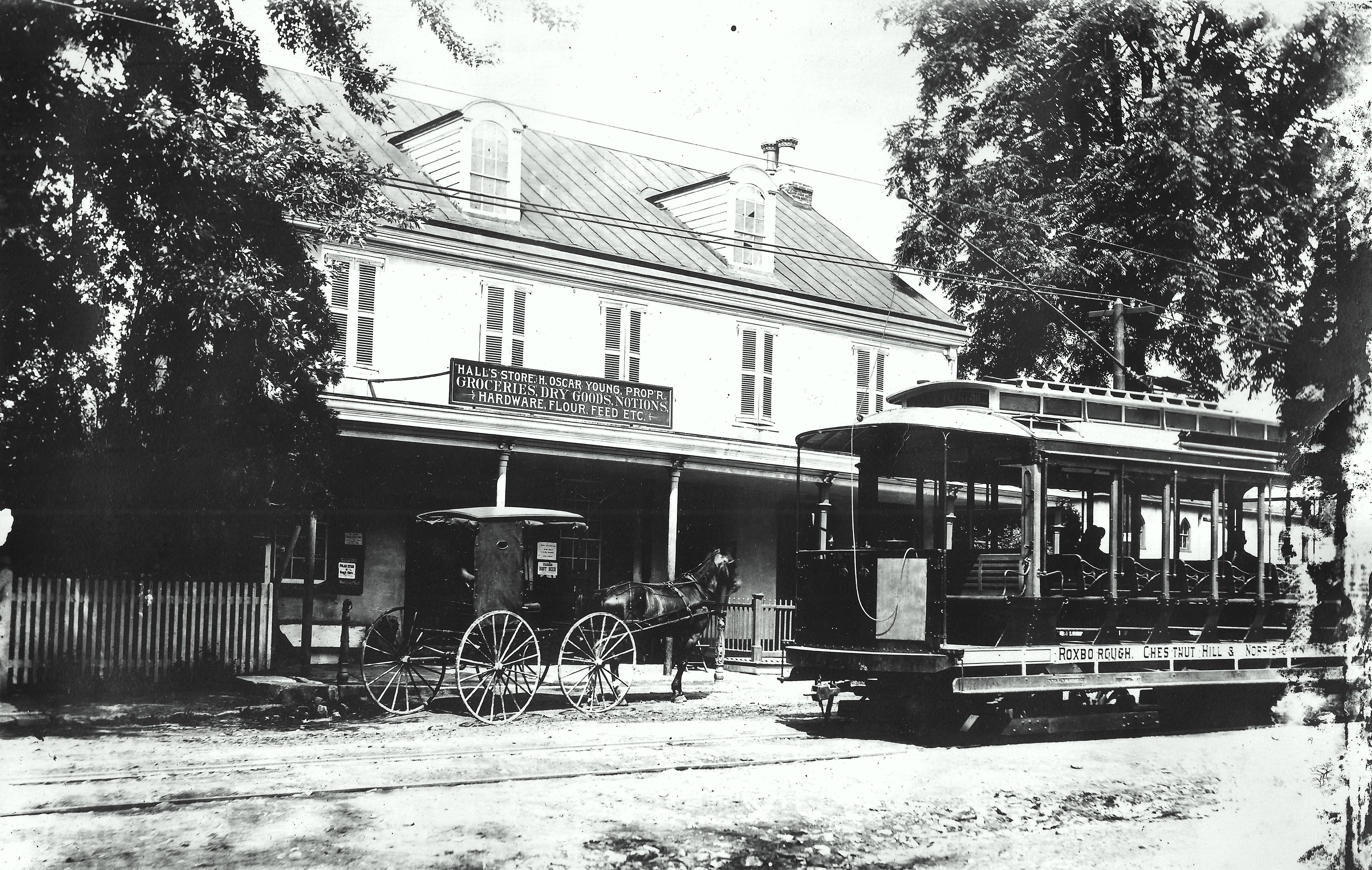
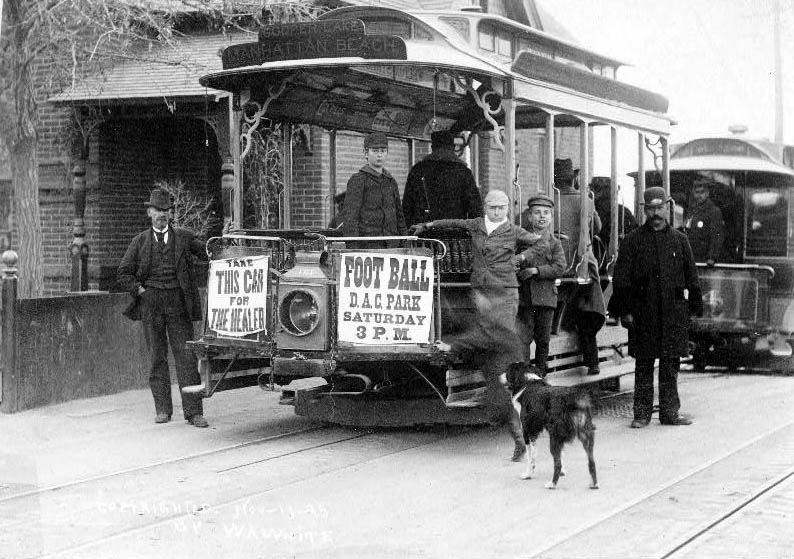
Left to right: Horse-drawn, electric, and cable street cars in the United States

In the latter half of the 19th century, transit systems were generally rail, first horse-drawn streetcars, and later electric powered streetcars and cable cars. Rail was more comfortable and had less rolling resistance than street traffic on granite block or macadam and horse-drawn streetcars were generally a step up from the horse-drawn omnibus. Electric traction was faster, more sanitary, and cheaper to run; with the cost, excreta, epizootic risk, and carcass disposal of horses eliminated entirely. Streetcars were later seen as obstructions to traffic, but for nearly 20 years they had the highest power-to-weight ratio of anything commonly found on the road, and the lowest rolling resistance.

Streetcars paid ordinary business and property taxes, but also generally paid franchise fees, maintained at least the shared right-of-way, and provided street sweeping and snow clearance. They were also required to maintain minimal service levels. Many franchise fees were fixed or based on gross (v. net); such arrangements, when combined with fixed fares, created gradual impossible financial pressures. Early electric cars generally had a two-man crew, a holdover from horsecar days, which created financial problems in later years as salaries outpaced revenues.

Many electric lines—especially in the West—were tied into other real estate or transportation enterprises. The Pacific Electric and the Los Angeles Railway were especially so, in essence loss leaders for property development and long haul shipping.

By 1918, half of US streetcar mileage was in bankruptcy.

=== Early years ===
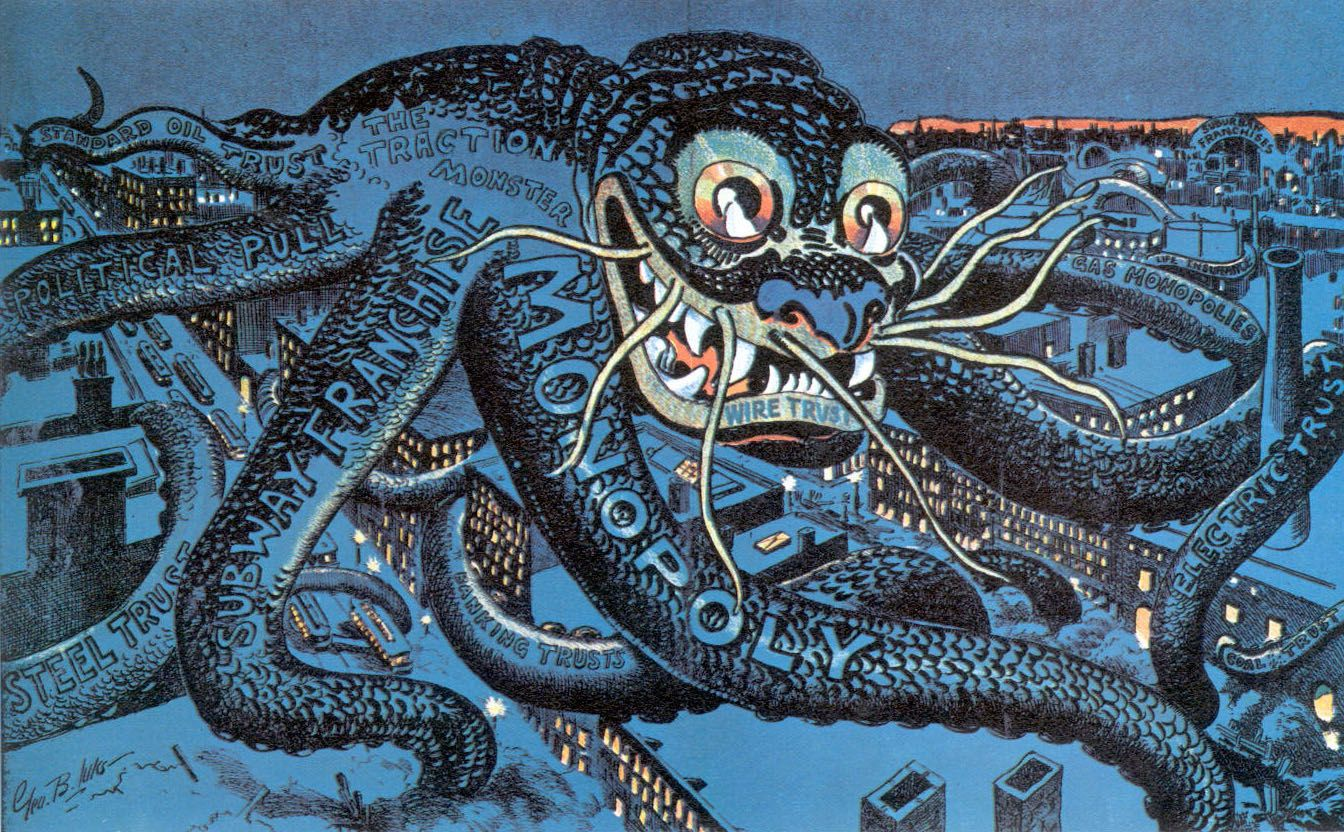
The Menace of the Hour, 1899 illustration by George Luks depicting the new electric subway system in New York City as an octopus ("the menace")

John D. Hertz, better remembered for his car rental business, was also an early motorbus manufacturer and operator. In 1917 he founded the Chicago Motor Coach Company, which operated buses in Chicago, and in 1923, he founded the Yellow Coach Manufacturing Company, a manufacturer of buses. He then formed The Omnibus Corporation in 1926 with "plans embracing the extension of motor coach operation to urban and rural communities in every part of the United States" that then purchased the Fifth Avenue Coach Company in New York. The same year, the Fifth Avenue Coach Company acquired a majority of the stock in the struggling New York Railways Corporation (which had been bankrupted and reorganized at least twice). In 1926, General Motors acquired a controlling share of the Yellow Coach Manufacturing Company and appointed Hertz as a main board director. Hertz's bus lines, however, were not in direct competition with any streetcars, and his core business was the higher-priced "motor coach".

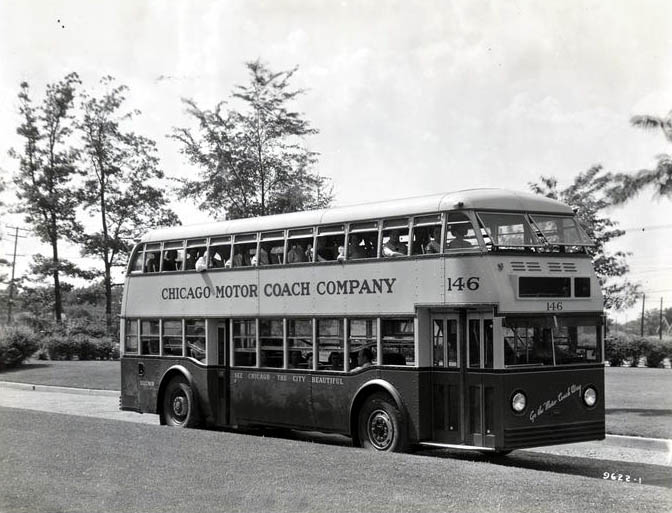
A Chicago Motor Coach Company double decker bus in 1936

By 1930, most streetcar systems were aging and losing money. Service to the public was suffering; the Great Depression compounded this. Yellow Coach tried to persuade transit companies to replace streetcars with buses, but could not persuade the power companies that owned the streetcar operations to motorize. GM decided to form a new subsidiary—United Cities Motor Transport (UCMT)—to finance the conversion of streetcar systems to buses in small cities. The new subsidiary made investments in small transit systems in Kalamazoo and Saginaw, Michigan, and in Springfield, Ohio, where they were successful in conversion to buses. UCMT then approached the Portland, Oregon, system with a similar proposal. The UCMT was censured by the American Transit Association and dissolved in 1935.

The New York Railways Corporation began conversion to buses in 1935, with the new bus services being operated by the New York City Omnibus Corporation, which shared management with The Omnibus Corporation. During this period, GM worked with Public Service Transportation in New Jersey to develop the "All-Service Vehicle", a bus also capable of working as a trackless trolley, allowing off-wire passenger collection in areas too lightly populated to pay for wire infrastructure.

Opposition to traction interests and their influence on politicians was growing. For example, in 1922, New York Supreme Court Justice John Ford came out in favor of William Randolph Hearst, a newspaper magnate, for mayor of New York, complaining that Al Smith was too close to the "traction interests". In 1925, Hearst complained about Smith in a similar way. In the 1941 film Citizen Kane, the lead character, who was loosely based on Hearst and Samuel Insull, complains about the influence of the "traction interests".

The Public Utility Holding Company Act of 1935, which made it illegal for a single private business to both provide public transport and supply electricity to other parties, forced electricity generator companies to divest from trolley, streetcar, electric suburban, and interurban transit operators that they used to cross-subsidize in order to increase the basis of their limited return on investment.

=== National City Lines, Pacific City Lines, American City Lines ===
In 1936, National City Lines (NCL), which had been started in 1920 as a minor bus operation by E. Roy Fitzgerald and his brother, was reorganized "for the purpose of taking over the controlling interest in certain operating companies engaged in city bus transportation and overland bus transportation" with loans from the suppliers and manufacturers. In 1939, Roy Fitzgerald, president of NCL, approached Yellow Coach Manufacturing, requesting additional financing for expansion. In the 1940s, NCL raised funds for expansion from Firestone Tire, Federal Engineering, a subsidiary of Standard Oil of California (now Chevron Corporation), Phillips Petroleum (now part of ConocoPhillips), GM, and Mack Trucks (now a subsidiary of Volvo). Pacific City Lines (PCL), formed as a subsidiary of NCL in 1938, was to purchase streetcar systems in the western United States. PCL merged with NCL in 1948. American City Lines (ACL), which had been organized to acquire local transportation systems in the larger metropolitan areas in various parts of the country in 1943, was merged with NCL in 1946. The federal government investigated some aspects of NCL's financial arrangements in 1941 (which calls into question the conspiracy myths' centrality of Quinby's 1946 letter). By 1947, NCL owned or controlled 46 systems in 45 cities in 16 states.

From 1939 through 1940, NCL or PCL attempted a hostile takeover of the Key System, which operated electric trains and streetcars in Oakland, California. The attempt was temporarily blocked by a syndicate of Key System insiders, with controlling interest secured on January 8, 1941. By 1946, PCL had acquired 64% of the stock in the Key System.

Beginning in the 1940s, NCL and PCL slowly took control of Los Angeles' two streetcar systems: Pacific Electric Railway (known as the "Red Cars") and Los Angeles Railway (known as the "Yellow Cars"). In 1940, PCL acquired Pacific Electric's operations in Glendale, Burbank, and Pasadena. Lines to San Bernardino were phased out in 1941 and the Hollywood Subway, which ran lines from Burbank, Glendale, and the San Fernando Valley, closed in 1955. In 1945, ACL acquired Los Angeles Railway at a price of about $13,000,000. Soon after, the company announced it would scrap all but three of the existing Yellow Car lines.

In 1953, the remainder of Pacific Electric's network was sold to Metropolitan City Lines, a subsidiary of PCL. Subsequently, the remaining assets of the original Pacific Electric system and the original Los Angeles Railway system were sold by Metropolitan City Lines and Los Angeles Transit Lines, respectively, to the newly formed Los Angeles Metropolitan Transit Authority. Under the new public authority, the final remaining streetcars in Los Angeles were phased out, with the final Red Car (Los Angeles to Long Beach Line) making its last service on April 9, 1961 and the last Yellow Car (V Line) on March 31, 1963.

=== Edwin J. Quinby ===
In 1946, Edwin Jenyss Quinby, an activated reserve commander, founder of the Electric Railroaders' Association in 1934 (which lobbied on behalf of rail users and services), and former employee of North Jersey Rapid Transit (which operated into New York State), published a 24-page "expose" on the ownership of National City Lines addressed to "The Mayors; The City Manager; The City Transit Engineer; The members of The Committee on Mass-Transportation and The Tax-Payers and The Riding Citizens of Your Community". It began, "This is an urgent warning to each and every one of you that there is a careful, deliberately planned campaign to swindle you out of your most important and valuable public utilities–your Electric Railway System". His activism may have led Federal authorities to prosecute GM and the other companies.

He also questioned who was behind the creation of the Public Utility Holding Company Act of 1935, which had caused such difficulty for streetcar operations, He was later to write a history of North Jersey Rapid Transit.

=== Court cases, conviction, and fines ===
On April 9, 1947, nine corporations and seven individuals (officers and directors of certain of the corporate defendants) were indicted in the Federal District Court of Southern California on counts of "conspiring to acquire control of a number of transit companies, forming a transportation monopoly" and "conspiring to monopolize sales of buses and supplies to companies owned by National City Lines" In 1948, the venue was changed from the Federal District Court of Southern California to the Federal District Court in Northern Illinois following an appeal to the United States Supreme Court (in United States v. National City Lines Inc.) which felt that there was evidence of conspiracy to monopolize the supply of buses and supplies.

In 1949, Firestone Tire, Standard Oil of California, Phillips Petroleum, GM, and Mack Trucks were convicted of conspiring to monopolize the sale of buses and related products to local transit companies controlled by NCL; they were acquitted of conspiring to monopolize the ownership of these companies. The verdicts were upheld on appeal in 1951. GM was fined $5,000 (equivalent to $62,000 in 2025) and GM treasurer H.C. Grossman was fined $1. The trial judge said "I am very frank to admit to counsel that after a very exhaustive review of the entire transcript in this case, and of the exhibits that were offered and received in evidence, that I might not have come to the same conclusion as the jury came to were I trying this case without a jury," explicitly noting that he might not himself have convicted in a bench trial.

In 1948, the San Diego Electric Railway was sold to Western Transit Company, owned by J. L. Haugh, for $5.5 million. Haugh was also president of the Key System, and later was involved in Metropolitan Coach Line's purchase of the passenger operations of the Pacific Electric Railway. The last San Diego streetcars were converted to buses by 1949. Haugh sold the bus-based San Diego system to the city in 1966.

The Baltimore Streetcar system operated by the Baltimore Transit Company was purchased by NCL in 1948 and started converting the system to buses. Overall Baltimore Transit ridership then plummeted by double digits in each of the following three years. The Pacific Electric Railway's struggling passenger operations were purchased by Metropolitan Coach Lines in 1953 and were taken into public ownership in 1958 after which the last routes were converted to bus operation.

=== Urban Mass Transportation Act and 1974 Antitrust hearings ===
The Urban Mass Transportation Act of 1964 (UMTA) created the Urban Mass Transit Administration with a remit to "conserve and enhance values in existing urban areas" noting that "our national welfare therefore requires the provision of good urban transportation, with the properly balanced use of private vehicles and modern mass transport to help shape as well as serve urban growth". Funding for transit was increased with the Urban Mass Transportation Act of 1970 and further extended by the National Mass Transportation Assistance Act (1974) which allowed funds to support transit operating costs as well as capital construction costs.

In 1970, Harvard Law student Robert Eldridge Hicks began working on the Ralph Nader Study Group Report on Land Use in California, alleging a wider conspiracy to dismantle U.S. streetcar systems, first published in Politics of Land: Ralph Nader's Study Group Report on Land Use in California.

During 1973, Bradford Snell, an attorney with Pillsbury, Madison and Sutro and formerly, for a brief time, a scholar with the Brookings Institution, prepared a controversial and disputed paper titled "American ground transport: a proposal for restructuring the automobile, truck, bus, and rail industries." The paper, which was funded by the Stern Fund, was later described as the centerpiece of the hearings. In it, Snell said that General Motors was "a sovereign economic state" and said that the company played a major role in the displacement of rail and bus transportation by buses and trucks.

This paper was distributed in Senate binding together with an accompanying statement in February 1974, implying that the contents were the considered views of the Senate. The chair of the committee later apologized for this error. Adding to the confusion, Snell had already joined the Senate Judiciary Committee's Subcommittee on Antitrust and Monopoly as a staff member.

At the hearings in April 1974, San Francisco mayor and antitrust attorney Joseph Alioto testified that "General Motors and the automobile industry generally exhibit a kind of monopoly evil", adding that GM "has carried on a deliberate concerted action with the oil companies and tire companies...for the purpose of destroying a vital form of competition; namely, electric rapid transit". Los Angeles mayor Tom Bradley also testified, saying that GM, through its subsidiaries (namely PCL), "scrapped the Pacific Electric and Los Angeles streetcar systems leaving the electric train system totally destroyed". Neither mayor, nor Snell himself, pointed out that the two cities were major parties to a lawsuit against GM which Snell himself had been "instrumental in bringing"; all had a direct or indirect financial interest. (The lawsuit was eventually dropped, the plaintiffs conceding they had no chance of winning.)

However, George Hilton, a professor of economics at UCLA and noted transit scholar rejected Snell's view, stating, "I would argue that these [Snell's] interpretations are not correct, and, further, that they couldn't possibly be correct, because major conversions in society of this character—from rail to free wheel urban transportation, and from steam to diesel railroad propulsion—are the sort of conversions which could come about only as a result of public preferences, technological change, the relative abundance of natural resources, and other impersonal phenomena or influence, rather than the machinations of a monopolist."

GM published a rebuttal the same year titled "The Truth About American Ground Transport". The Senate subcommittee printed GM's work in tandem with Snell's as an appendix to the hearings transcript. GM explicitly did not address the specific allegations that were sub judice.

=== Role in decline of the streetcars ===
Quinby and Snell held that the destruction of streetcar systems was integral to a larger strategy to push the United States into automobile dependency. Most transit scholars disagree, suggesting that transit system changes were brought about by other factors; economic, social, and political factors such as unrealistic capitalization, fixed fares during inflation, changes in paving and automotive technology, the Great Depression, antitrust action, the Public Utility Holding Company Act of 1935, labor unrest, market forces including declining industries' difficulty in attracting capital, rapidly increasing traffic congestion, the Good Roads Movement, urban sprawl, tax policies favoring private vehicle ownership, taxation of fixed infrastructure, consumerism, franchise repair costs for co-located property, wide diffusion of driving skills, automatic transmission buses, and general enthusiasm for the automobile. (Note: See elsewhere in this article for cited sources for all of these claims, notably in the 'Other factors' section.)

The accuracy of significant elements of Snell's 1974 testimony was challenged in an article published in Transportation Quarterly in 1997 by Cliff Slater. A significant rebuttal to Slater's article was published about one year later in the 1998 Transportation Quarterly finding that, without GM and other companies' efforts, the streetcar would not "have been driven to the verge of extinction by 1968".

Recent journalistic analyses question the idea that GM had a significant impact on the decline of streetcars, suggesting rather that they were setting themselves up to take advantage of the decline as it occurred. Guy Span suggested that Snell and others fell into simplistic conspiracy theory thinking, bordering on paranoid delusions stating,

Clearly, GM waged a war on electric traction. It was indeed an all out assault, but by no means the single reason for the failure of rapid transit. Also, it is just as clear that actions and inactions by government contributed significantly to the elimination of electric traction."

In 2010, CBS's Mark Henricks reported:

There is no question that a GM-controlled entity called National City Lines did buy a number of municipal trolley car systems. And it's beyond doubt that, before too many years went by, those street car operations were closed down. It's also true that GM was convicted in a post-war trial of conspiring to monopolize the market for transportation equipment and supplies sold to local bus companies. What's not true is that the explanation for these events is a nefarious plot to trade private corporate profits for viable public transportation.

== Other factors ==
Other factors have been cited as reasons for the general decline of streetcars and public transport in the United States. Robert Post notes that the ultimate reach of GM's alleged conspiracy extended to only about 10% of American transit systems. Guy Span said that actions and inaction by government was one of many contributing factors in the elimination of electric traction. Cliff Slater suggested that the regulatory framework in the US actually protected the electric streetcars for longer than would have been the case if there was less regulation.

Some regulations and regulatory changes have been linked directly to the decline of the streetcars:

- Difficult labor relations and tight regulation of fares, routes, and schedules took their toll on city streetcar systems.
- The streetcars' contracts in many cities required them to keep the pavement on the roads surrounding the tracks in good shape. Such conditions, previously agreed to in exchange for the explicit right to operate as a monopoly in that city, became an expensive burden.
- The Public Utility Holding Company Act of 1935 prohibited regulated electric utilities from operating unregulated businesses, which included most streetcar lines. The act also placed restrictions on services operating across state lines. Many holding companies operated both streetcars and electric utilities across several states; those that owned both types of businesses were forced to sell off one. Declining streetcar business was often somewhat less valuable than the growing consumer electric business, resulting in many streetcar systems being put up for sale. The independent lines, no longer associated with an electric utility holding company, had to purchase electricity at full price from their former parents, further shaving their already thin margins. The Great Depression then left many streetcar operators short of funds for maintenance and capital improvements.
- In New York City, and other North American cities, the presence of restrictive legal agreements such as the Dual Contracts, signed by the Interborough Rapid Transit Company and Brooklyn–Manhattan Transit Corporation of the New York City Subway, restricted the ability of private mass transit operators to increase fares at a time of high inflation, allowed the city to take over them, or to operate competing subsidized transit.

Different funding models have also been highlighted:

- Streetcar lines were built using funds from private investors and were required to pay numerous taxes and dividends. By contrast, new roads were constructed and maintained by the government from tax income.
- By 1916, street railroads nationwide were wearing out their equipment faster than they were replacing it. While operating expenses were generally recovered, money for long-term investment was generally diverted elsewhere.
- The U.S. government responded to the Great Depression with massive subsidies for road construction.
- Later construction of the Interstate Highway System was authorized by the Federal Aid Highway Act of 1956 which approved the expenditure of $25 billion of public money for the creation of a new 41,000-mile (66,000 km) interstate road network. One streetcar operator was even required to pay for the reinstatement of its own line following the construction of the freeways.
- Federal fuel taxes, introduced in 1956, were paid into a new Highway Trust Fund which could only fund highway construction (until 1983 when some 10% was diverted into a new Mass Transit Account).

Other issues which made it harder to operate viable streetcar services include:

- Suburbanization and urban sprawl, exacerbated in the US by white flight, created low-density land use patterns which are not easily served by streetcars, or indeed by any public transport, to this day.
- Increased traffic congestion often reduced service speeds and thereby increased their operational costs and made the services less attractive to the remaining users.
- More recently it has been suggested that the provision of free parking facilities at destinations and in the center of cities loads all users with the cost of facilities enjoyed only by motorists, creating additional traffic congestion and significantly affects the viability of other transport modes.

== Counterarguments ==
Some of the specific allegations which have been argued over the years include:

- According to Snell's testimony, the New York, New Haven & Hartford Railroad (NH) in New York and Connecticut was profitable until it was acquired and converted to diesel trains. The New Haven's main line between New York City and New Haven, Connecticut, remained electrified, and continues as such under Metro-North Railroad and Amtrak. In reality, the line was in financial difficulty for years and filed for bankruptcy in 1935.
- "GM killed the New York street cars": In reality, the New York Railways Company entered receivership in 1919, six years before it was bought by the New York Railways Corporation.
- "GM Killed the Red cars in Los Angeles": Pacific Electric Railway (which operated the "red cars") was hemorrhaging routes as traffic congestion worsened with growing car ownership levels after the end of World War II.
- The Salt Lake City system is mentioned in the 1949 court papers. However, the city's system was purchased by National City Lines in 1944 when all but one route had already been withdrawn, and the withdrawal of this last line had been approved three years earlier.

== In popular culture ==
The story as an urban legend has been written about by Martha Bianco, Scott Bottles, Sy Adler, Jonathan Richmond, Cliff Slater, and Robert Post. It has been depicted several times in print, film, and other media, notably in the fictional film Who Framed Roger Rabbit, documentary films such as Taken for a Ride and The End of Suburbia and the book Internal Combustion.

== Legacy ==
Only a handful of U.S. cities, including San Francisco, New Orleans, Newark, Cleveland, Philadelphia, Pittsburgh, and Boston, have surviving legacy-rail urban transport systems based on streetcars, although their systems are significantly smaller than they once were. Other cities, such as Norfolk, have re-introduced streetcars.

== See also ==
- Federal Aid Road Act of 1916
- Federal Aid Highway Act of 1921 (Phipps Act)
- Federal Aid Highway Act of 1956
- Nader v. General Motors Corp. A court case in which consumer protection activist Ralph Nader claimed that GM had "conduct[ed] a campaign of intimidation against him in order to 'suppress plaintiff's criticism of and prevent his disclosure of information' about its products"
- Highway Trust Fund
- Brooklyn–Manhattan Transit Corporation (A corporation that was "recaptured" by the city using the Dual Contracts provisions)
- Chicago Motor Coach Company A bus transit company established by John Hertz in Chicago in 1917
- Dual Contracts Contracts between New York City and subway operators which restricted fares, enforced share profits and allowed the city to 'recapture' and operate lines
- Transportation in metropolitan Detroit (Details of a system that was already in public ownership)
- Toronto streetcar system, which received much of the rolling stock from affected systems
- List of streetcar systems in the United States
- List of trolleybus systems in the United States
