= Center for Auto Safety =

American consumer advocacy non-profit organization

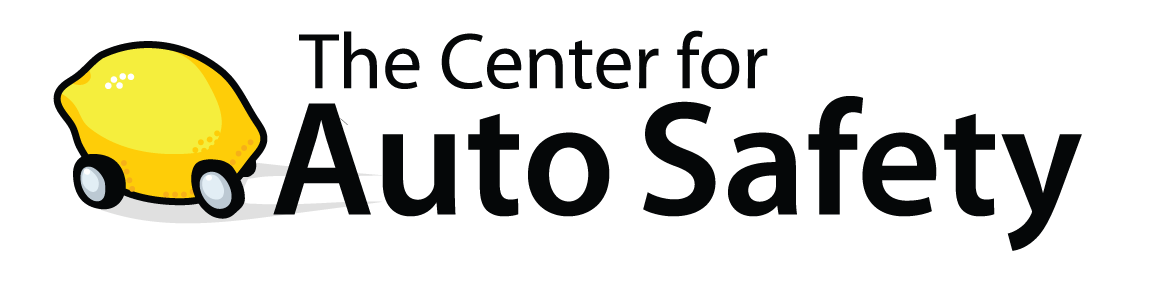

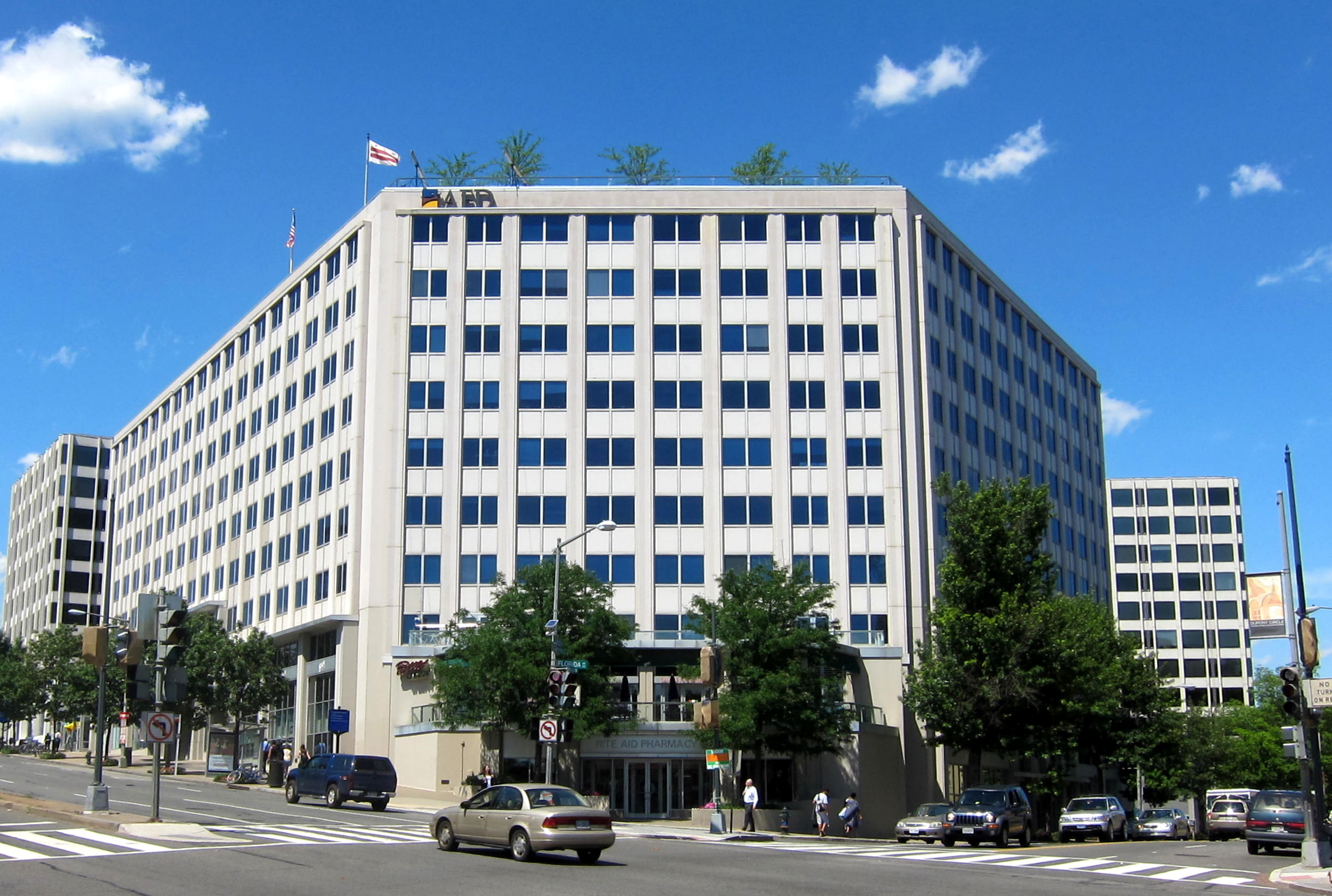
- CAS headquarters in Washington, D.C.
- Formation: 1970
- Founder: Consumers Union; Ralph Nader
- Type: Non-profit advocacy organization (501(c)(3))
- Legal status: Active
- Headquarters: Washington, D.C.
- Region served: United States
- Executive Director: Michael Brooks
- Website: autosafety.org

The Center for Auto Safety (CAS) is an American 501(c)(3) consumer advocacy non-profit group focused on the automotive industry in the United States. Founded in 1970 by Consumers Union and Ralph Nader, the group focuses its efforts on enacting reform though public advocacy and pressuring the National Highway Traffic Safety Administration and automakers through litigation.

For decades, it was led by Executive Director Clarence Ditlow, who died in late 2016 from cancer. Ditlow was widely admired in the auto safety community, although he also had detractors among auto manufacturers. The Center for Auto Safety is currently led by Executive Director Michael Brooks.

== History ==
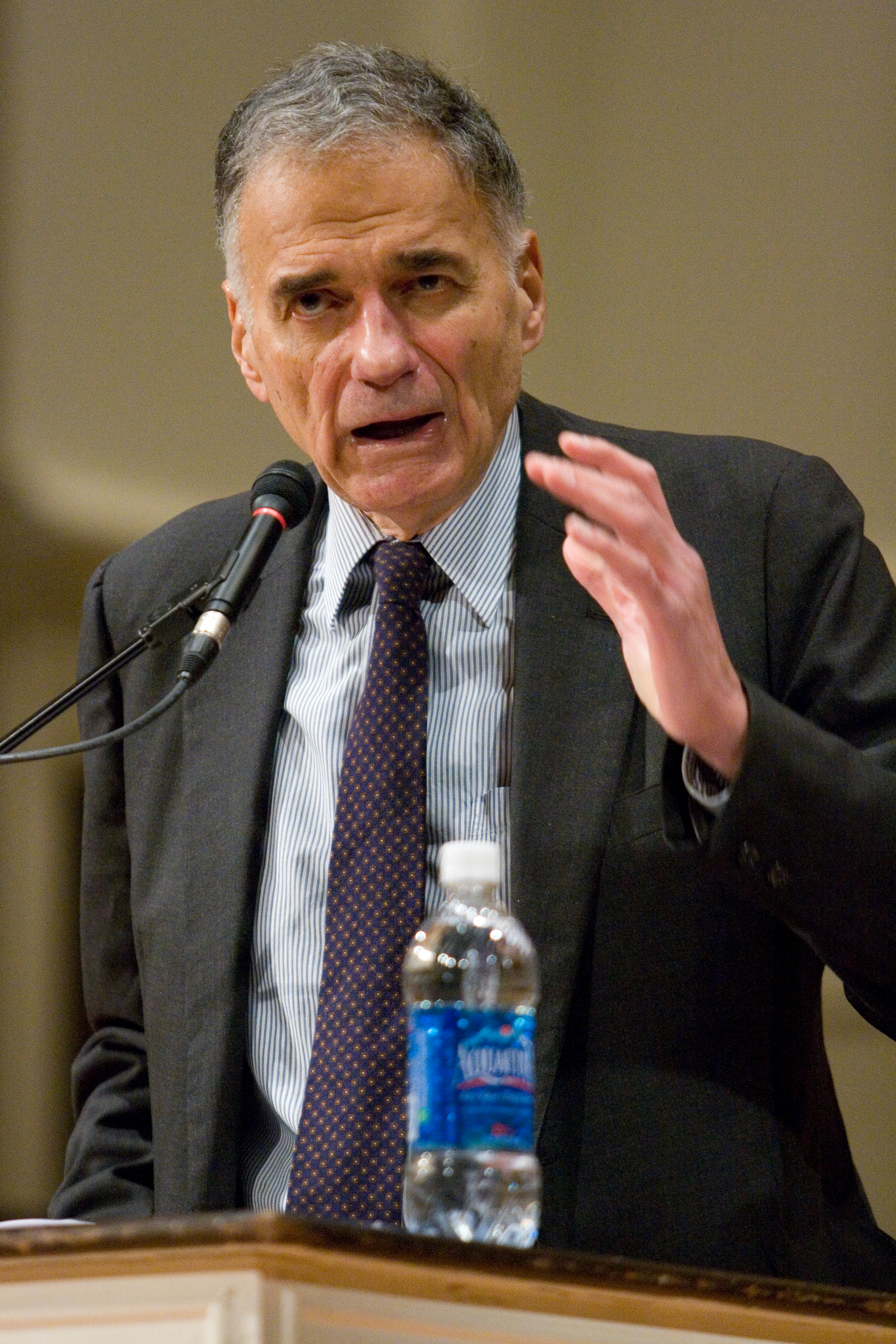
CAS co-founder Ralph Nader

The Center for Auto Safety (the Center) was founded in 1970 by Consumers Union and Ralph Nader as a consumer safety group to protect drivers. Ralph Nader, the author of Unsafe at Any Speed, believed that automakers and the government were not adequately regulating safety. For many years, the Center was led by Clarence Ditlow, a well-known consumer safety advocate.

The Center has advocated vigorously for driver safety and automaker accountability by pressuring government agencies and automakers with many lawsuits campaigns. The Center had also published The Car Book annually for 40 years, which presented the latest safety ratings, dealer prices, fuel economy, insurance premiums, and maintenance costs for new vehicles.

=== Lemon laws ===
The Center for Auto Safety counts the enacting of lemon laws in all 50 states among its greatest successes. The Center has testified over 50 times before Congressional Committees on auto safety, warranties and service bulletins, air pollution, consumer protection, and fuel economy. The Center was the leading consumer advocate in passage of Magnuson-Moss Warranty Act, fuel economy provisions of Energy Policy and Conservation Act and Technical Service Bulletin disclosure in MAP-21.

The Center recently succeeded in a lawsuit against DOT Secretary Anthony Foxx, forcing NHTSA to make public all manufacturer communications to dealers regarding safety issues.

Additionally, former Center Executive Director Clarence Ditlow and Ralph Nader published The Lemon Book in 1980 to educate drivers on how to avoid buying a "lemon" and what to do if they purchase one.

=== Recalls ===
The Center for Auto Safety has been involved in many campaigns to pressure automakers and NHTSA to issue recalls on dangerous car parts. Throughout its history, the Center has played a major role in numerous recalls including 6.7 million Chevrolets for defective engine mounts, 15 million Firestone 500 tires, 1.5 million Ford Pintos for exploding gas tanks, 3 million Evenflo child seats for defective latches.

More recently, the Center was the main proponent for recalls of 7 million Toyotas for sudden acceleration, 2 million Jeeps for fuel tank fires, 11 million GM vehicles for defective ignition switches, and over 60 million exploding Takata airbag inflators.

== Accomplishments ==
The Center for Auto Safety counts numerous far-reaching efforts among its successes:

- "Lemon laws" enacted in all 50 states
- State laws requiring auto manufacturers to disclose "hidden" warranties to consumers
- The Firestone tire recall
- The Ford Pinto recall due to its dangerous gas tank design
- Exposure of a potentially lethal gas tank design in General Motors pickup trucks
- Improved U.S. highway safety standards administered by the U.S. National Highway Traffic Safety Administration (NHTSA)
- Recall of Jeep vehicles with fuel tanks that could explode in rear impact
- Pressuring General Motors to take action on their faulty airbags and ignition switches
- 40 years of annual publication of The Car Book to inform drivers of the safety of specific models
- Better protection for drivers against rollover and roof crush in SUVs
- Maintaining an online database of vehicle safety complaints submitted to the Center
- Wrote Small—On Safety: The Designed-in Dangers of the Volkswagen.
