= National City Lines =

Bus transportation company (1936–2007)

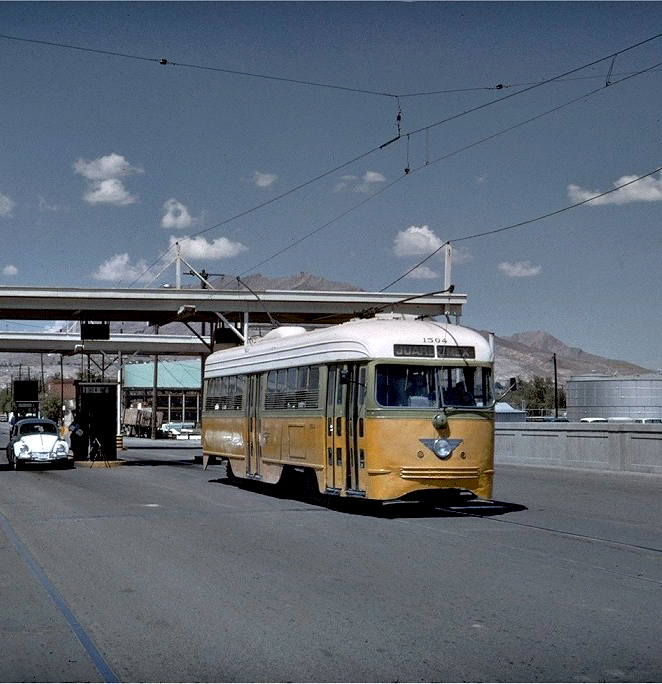
- PCC streetcar 1504 operated by National City Lines' El Paso City Lines subsidiary leaves the U.S.-Mexico border in 1960, headed to Ciudad Juárez
- Industry: Public transportation
- Founded: 1936
- Defunct: 2007
- Fate: Acquired by Contran
- Headquarters: Chicago, Illinois
- Products: Holding company for streetcar and bus lines

National City Lines, Inc. (NCL) was an American public transportation company that operated streetcar and bus lines.

It grew out of the Fitzgerald brothers' bus operations, founded in Minnesota in 1920 as a modest local transport company operating two buses. Part of the Fitzgerald's operations were reorganized into a holding company in 1936. It soon expanded with equity funding from General Motors, Firestone Tire, Standard Oil of California and Phillips Petroleum for the express purpose of acquiring local transit systems throughout the United States in what became known as the General Motors streetcar conspiracy.

The company formed a subsidiary, Pacific City Lines in 1937 to purchase streetcar systems in the Western United States. National City Lines, and Pacific City Lines were indicted in 1947 on charges of conspiring to acquire control of a number of transit companies, and of forming a transportation monopoly for the purpose of "conspiring to monopolize sales of buses and supplies to companies owned by National City Lines." They were acquitted on the first charge and convicted on the second in 1949.

== History ==
The company has roots back to 1920, when E. Roy Fitzgerald and his brother began operating two buses in Minnesota, (Note: United States Court of Appeals for the Seventh Circuit (1951), para 6 "It is undisputed that on April 1, 1939, defendant National City Lines, Inc., had grown from a humble beginning in 1920, consisting of the ownership and operation of two second-hand buses in Minnesota, to ownership or control of 29 local operating transportation companies located in 27 different cities in 10 states.") transporting miners and schoolchildren. In 1936 the company was organized into a holding company. (Note: United States Court of Appeals for the Seventh Circuit (1951), para 8 "National City Lines, organized in 1936, as a holding company to acquire and operate local transit companies, had brought, up to the time when the contracts were executed, its necessary equipment and fuel products from different suppliers, with no long-term contract with any of them. Pacific City Lines was organized for the purpose of acquiring local transit companies on the Pacific Coast and commenced doing business in January 1938. American was organized to acquire local transportation systems in the larger metropolitan areas in various parts of the country in 1943. It merged with National in 1946.") In 1938, National City Lines wished to purchase transportation systems in cities "where street cars were no longer practicable" and replace them with passenger buses. To fund this expansion the company obtained equity funding from companies seeking to increase sales of commercial buses and supplies, including General Motors, Firestone Tire, Standard Oil of California and Phillips Petroleum. (Note: United States Court of Appeals for the Seventh Circuit (1951), para 9 "In 1938, National conceived the idea of purchasing transportation systems in cities where street cars were no longer practicable and supplanting the latter with passenger buses. Its capital was limited and its earlier experience in public financing convinced it that it could not successfully finance the purchase of an increasing number of operating companies in various parts of the United States by such means. Accordingly it devised the plan of procuring funds from manufacturing companies whose products its operating companies were using constantly in their business. National approached General Motors, which manufactures buses and delivers them to the various sections of the United States. It approached Firestone, whose business of manufacturing and supplying tires extends likewise throughout the nation. In the middle west, where a large part of its operating subsidiaries were to be located, it solicited investment of funds from Phillips, which operates throughout that section but not on the east or west coast. Pacific undertook the procurement of funds from General Motors and Firestone and also from Standard Oil of California, which operates on the Pacific coast. Mack Truck Company was also solicited. Eventually each of the suppliers entered into a contract with City Lines defendants of the character we have described whereby City Lines companies agreed that they would buy their exclusive requirements from the contracting supplier and from no one else.")

In 1936, they bought 13 transit companies in Illinois, Oklahoma and Michigan, then in 1937, they replaced streetcars in Butte, Montana and made purchases in Mississippi and Texas. Sometimes these systems were already run down, but not always. Major investment had recently been made with improvements to the streetcars systems in Beaumont, Texas. The Butte system, while sound, deliberately replaced to lower the load on the overtaxed electric system, which was primarily used for commercial uses, including electrolytic refining of copper and zinc.

In 1938 the company entered into exclusive dealing arrangements and obtained equity funding from companies seeking to increase sales of commercial buses and supplies, including General Motors, Firestone Tire, Standard Oil of California and Phillips Petroleum. The company was indicted in 1947 and was later convicted in the United States District Court for the Northern District of Illinois of conspiring to monopolize the sale of buses and related products to the local transit companies that they controlled.

Over 1938 and 1939 the company made purchases in Alabama, Indiana and Ohio. and by 1939, it owned or controlled 29 local transportation companies in 27 different cities in 10 states.

American City Lines, which had been organized to acquire local transportation systems in the larger metropolitan areas in various parts of the country in 1943 merged with NCL in 1946. By 1947 the company owned or controlled 46 systems in 45 cities in 16 states. (Note: United States Court of Appeals for the Seventh Circuit (1951), para 6 "At the time the indictment was returned, the City Lines defendants had expanded their ownership or control to 46 transportation systems located in 45 cities in 16 states..")

In 1947 National City Lines, with others was indicted in the Federal District Court of Southern California on two counts: 'conspiring to acquire control of a number of transit companies, forming a transportation monopolize' and 'Conspiring to monopolize sales of buses and supplies to companies owned by National City Lines' in what became known as the Great American streetcar scandal (or 'General Motors streetcar conspiracy', 'National City Lines conspiracy'). (Note: United States Court of Appeals for the Seventh Circuit (1951), para 1, "On April 9, 1947, nine corporations and seven individuals, constituting officers and directors of certain of the corporate defendants, were indicted on two counts, the second of which charged them with conspiring to monopolize certain portions of interstate commerce, in violation of Section 2 of the Anti-trust Act, 15 U.S.C.A. § 2.")

In 1948, the United States Supreme Court (in United States v. National City Lines Inc.) permitted a change in venue to the Federal District Court in Northern Illinois. National City Lines merged with Pacific City Lines the same year.

In 1949, General Motors, Standard Oil of California, Firestone and others were convicted of conspiring to monopolize the sale of buses and related products to local transit companies controlled by NCL and other companies; they were acquitted of conspiring to monopolize the ownership of these companies. The verdicts were upheld on appeal in 1951. (Note: United States Court of Appeals for the Seventh Circuit (1951), para 33, "We have considered carefully all the evidence offered and excluded. We think that the court's rulings were fair, and that, having permitted great latitude in admitting testimony as to intent, purpose and reasons for the making of the contracts, the court, in its discretion, was entirely justified in excluding the additional testimony offered.") The corporations involved were fined $5000, their executives $1 apiece.

== Operating areas and companies ==
There is considerable uncertainty and variability amongst sources as to where National City Lines operated.

The 1948 ruling stated that:

"Forty-four cities in sixteen states are included. The states are as widely scattered as California, Florida, Maryland, Michigan, Nebraska, Texas and Washington. The larger local transportation systems include those of Baltimore, St. Louis, Salt Lake City, Los Angeles and Oakland. The largest concentrations of smaller systems are in Illinois, with eleven cities; California with nine (excluding Los Angeles); and Michigan with four. The local operating companies were not named as parties defendant."

This table attempts to bring together the many sources detailing the cities in which, at one time or another, National City Lines owned or controlled transit companies. A star (*) indicates that NCL is understood to have had significant control but not ownership:

- Alabama: Mobile, Montgomery
- California: Burbank, Eureka, Fresno, Glendale, Los Angeles*, Oakland*, Sacramento, Inglewood, Long Beach, San Jose, Pasadena, Stockton
- Florida: Tampa, Jacksonville*
- Illinois: Aurora/Elgin, Bloomington, Champaign, Danville, East St. Louis, Decatur, Galesburg, Joliet, Kewanee, LaSalle/Peru, Peoria, Quincy, Rock Island
- Indiana: South Bend, Terre Haute
- Iowa: Burlington, Davenport, Cedar Rapids, Ottumwa, Sioux City
- Maryland: Baltimore*
- Michigan: Jackson, Lansing, Kalamazoo, Saginaw, Pontiac
- Mississippi: Jackson
- Missouri: St. Louis*
- Montana: Butte, Great Falls
- Nebraska: Lincoln
- Ohio: Canton, Portsmouth
- Oklahoma: Tulsa
- Pennsylvania: Philadelphia*
- Texas: Beaumont, El Paso, Houston, Port Arthur, Wichita Falls
- Utah: Salt Lake City
- Washington: Bellingham, Everett, Spokane
- Wisconsin: Oshkosh

Additional information: In Los Angeles the Los Angeles Railway (Yellow Cars) was controlled by NCL but not Pacific Electric Railway (Red Cars)

== Montgomery City Lines and the Montgomery bus boycott ==
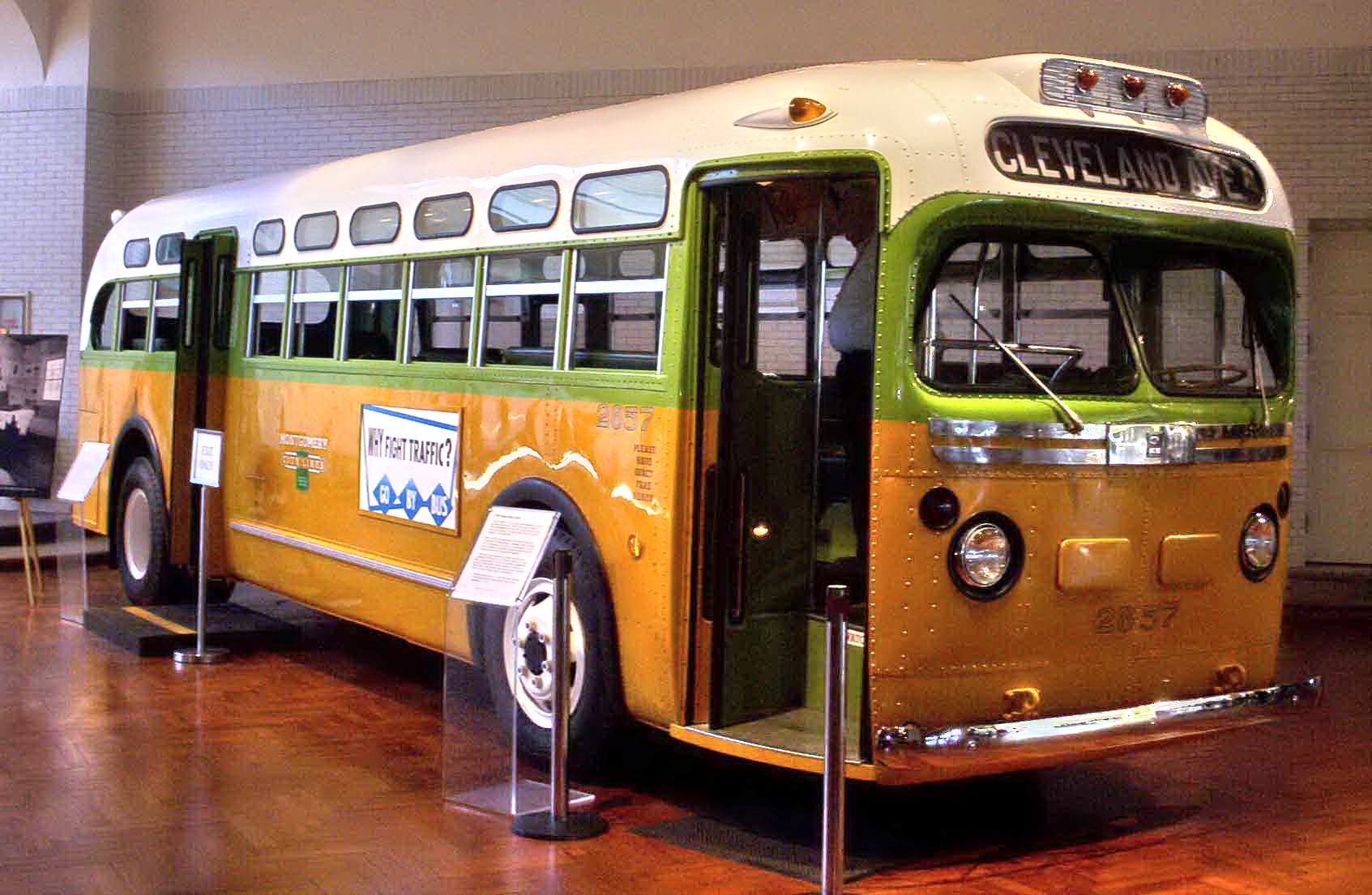
Montgomery City Lines bus Number 2857, on which Parks was riding before her arrest. The bus is shown as restored and exhibited at the Henry Ford Museum.

Montgomery City Lines was the National City Lines subsidiary that operated the municipal transit system for Montgomery, Alabama.

On 1 December 1955, Rosa Parks was arrested for refusing to move to the back of a Montgomery City Lines bus. This led to the Montgomery bus boycott. Montgomery City Lines was placed in the middle of a dispute between Montgomery's black citizenry and Montgomery city laws. In a letter published in the Montgomery Advertiser on December 3, 1955, Montgomery's Transportation Superintendent J. H. Bagley wrote:

The Montgomery City Lines is sorry if anyone expects us to be exempt from any state or city law ... [w]e are sorry that the colored people blame us for any state or city ordinance which we didn't have passed."

After Martin Luther King Jr. and the Montgomery Improvement Association wired a letter to National City Lines on 8 December 1955, the company's vice president, Kenneth E. Totten, traveled to Montgomery the following week.

The boycott lasted for just over a year, and cost the company $750,000 (equivalent to $8.9 million in 2025). The boycott ended only after the United States Supreme Court affirmed Browder v. Gayle, a ruling that black bus passengers had a right to sit in any publicly available seat.

== Later history ==
National City Lines acquired the trucking company Los Angeles-Seattle Motor Express (LASME) in 1959. In 1968, LASME merged with DC International and T.I.M.E. to form T.I.M.E.-DC. National City Lines sold its transportation management division in 1978.

National City Lines was later acquired by Harold C. Simmons early in 1981. T.I.M.E.-DC ceased operations in 1988. The company continued as a fully controlled subsidiary of Simmons' Contran operation until December 31, 2007, when it was dissolved.

== Notes ==
See reference section below for source documents relating to these notes and for further references
