= Midland train crash =

2012 railroad accident in Texas, US

Details
- Date: November 15, 2012; 4:36 PM
- Location: Midland, Texas
- Coordinates: 31.985629°N 102.093495°W
- Country: United States
- Operator: Union Pacific Railroad
- Incident type: Collision
- Cause: Failure of city and organizers to comply with railroad permits and safety

Statistics
- Trains: 1
- Deaths: 4
- Injured: 16

The Midland train crash was a rail crossing accident that occurred on November 15, 2012 in Midland, Texas. A freight train struck a flatbed trailer being used as a parade float carrying 26 passengers (12 of them United States Armed Forces veterans who had been wounded in action), killing four and injuring 16. The parade was en route to a veterans' benefit sponsored by the local charity Show of Support/Hunt for Heroes.

== Accident ==
At 4:36 p.m. on November 15, 2012, an eastbound Union Pacific Railroad freight train, UP ZLAAI, a high priority train hauling intermodal containers from Los Angeles, California to Shreveport, Louisiana, was traveling at 62 miles per hour (100 km/h). It was led by four locomotives: Union Pacific ES44AC 7877, Union Pacific SD70ACe 8497, Norfolk Southern C40-9W 8934, and Union Pacific ES44AC 7653. It struck a flat-bed semi-trailer that was acting as a parade float after it proceeded through the crossing as the train was approaching. Of the float's 26 passengers, 12 were US Armed Forces veterans that had been wounded in action, 12 were the spouses of the veterans, and two were civilian escorts. The impact killed two veterans immediately and two more died later at Midland Memorial Hospital; sixteen other passengers were injured. The truck driver – Dale Hayden, a 24-year US Army veteran – survived, as did the train crew – Simon "Trey" Terrazas and Nathan Scott.

Secretary of Defense Leon Panetta made a statement expressing condolences to the victims.

== National Transportation Safety Board investigation ==
Accident investigators from the National Transportation Safety Board were dispatched to the accident to determine the cause. In a press conference on November 17, NTSB member Mark Rosekind stated that the float started crossing the tracks after the warning bells and lights had been activated and while the crossing gate was lowering. The flashing lights and bell had begun 20 seconds before the train entered the intersection, and 7 seconds later the gate began to come down. It was one second after that (12 seconds before impact) that the float began crossing the track. The train's engineer sounded the horn nine seconds before the collision; seconds later the engineer also activated the train's emergency brake. The NTSB based these conclusions on video evidence from a dashboard camera mounted on an escorting police cruiser, a forward-mounted camera on the train, and the train's data recorder.

In November 2013, the NTSB issued its report, concluding that the probable cause of this collision was "the failure of the city of Midland and the parade organizer, “Show of Support, Military Hunt, Inc.” (Show of Support), to identify and mitigate the risks associated with routing a parade through a highway – railroad grade crossing." The NTSB also concluded that the city of Midland failed to follow and enforce its own ordinances, allowed the Show of Support parade to take place without a permit from 2009 to 2012, and failed to notify the railroad in advance of the parade.

== Union Pacific's installation and programming of the crossing signals ==
Following several months of investigation it was learned that: 1) Union Pacific was reimbursed with taxpayers' dollars to install signal gates at the crossing; 2) Union Pacific agreed with the State of Texas that when Union Pacific installed the signal gates at the crossing Union Pacific would program the signals to provide motorists with at least 30 seconds of warning time before the arrival of a train; 3) despite its agreement with the State of Texas that Union Pacific would program the signals to give motorists at least 30 seconds of warning time, Union Pacific programmed the signal system to provide only 25 seconds of warning time;

== Victims ==
The four veterans killed in the accident had all been wounded in combat overseas:

Name	Branch	Decorations
Lawrence Boivin	United States Army	Silver Star, Purple Heart
William Lubbers	United States Army	3x Bronze Star, Purple Heart
Joshua Michael	United States Army	2x Purple Heart
Gary Stouffer	United States Marine Corps	Purple Heart
