= Stockton Electric Railroad =

Former streetcar system in California

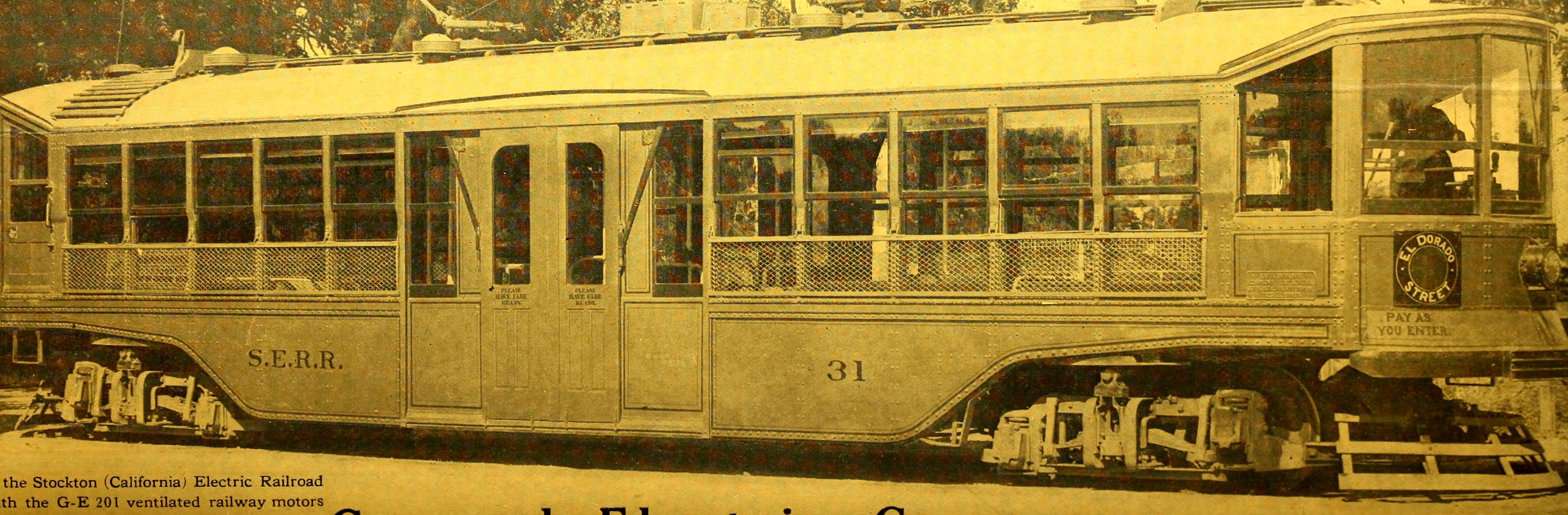
Stockton Electric Railroad car 31, built by the J. G. Brill Company

The Stockton Electric Railroad was the streetcar system serving Stockton, California. The company was under the control of Southern Pacific Railroad until 1939 when it was sold to Pacific City Lines. By 1931, the railroad operated 40 streetcars over 28 miles (45 km) of track.

== History ==
Incorporated in 1891, the company bought the mule-powered Stockton Street Railway Company (which was itself founded in 1871). Electric service began on July 15, 1892 and mules were eliminated the following month. Southern Pacific acquired the company in 1905, prompting full conversion of the narrow gauge rails to standard gauge. Starting in 1915, the Central California Traction Company began leasing their own streetcar lines in Stockton to the SER, bringing nearly all local operations under their control. Pacific City Lines acquired the railroad's assets in April 1939 and converted operations to buses in September 1941.

== Lines ==
By 1927, the company operated six lines:

- Main and El Dorado Line
- California and San Joaquin Line
- Vine and Ophir Line
- Center and Aurora Line
- Poplar and Weber Avenue Line
- Pilgrim Street Branch

== Rolling stock ==
Birney Safety Cars replaced two-truck cars between 1918 and 1921.
