= Unsafe at Any Speed =

1965 book by Ralph Nader

Unsafe at Any Speed: The Designed-In Dangers of the American Automobile
- Exhibit featuring the book at Henry Ford Museum, Detroit
- Author: Ralph Nader
- Publisher: Grossman Publishers
- Publication date: 30 November 1965
- OCLC: 568052

Unsafe at Any Speed: The Designed-In Dangers of the American Automobile is a non-fiction book by consumer advocate Ralph Nader, first published in 1965. Its central theme is that car manufacturers resisted the introduction of safety features (such as seat belts), and that they were generally reluctant to spend money on improving safety. The work contains substantial references and material from industry insiders. It was a best seller in non-fiction in 1966.

The book resulted in the creation of the United States Department of Transportation in 1966 and the predecessor agencies of the National Highway Traffic Safety Administration in 1970.

== Theme ==
Unsafe at Any Speed's critique of the Chevrolet Corvair received widespread attention. It also dealt with the use of tires and tire pressure being based on comfort rather than on safety, and the automobile industry disregarding technically based criticism. A 1972 National Highway Traffic Safety Administration report disputed Nader's allegations about abnormal handling in sharp turns and suggested that the Corvair's rollover rate was comparable to similar cars.

== Organization and content ==
Each of the book's chapters covers a different aspect of automotive safety:

=== "The Sporty Corvair" ===
1961–63 Corvair swing axle rear suspension

The subject for which the book is probably most widely known, the rear-engined Chevrolet Corvair, is covered in Chapter 1 "The Sporty Corvair: The One-Car Accident". This relates to the first models (1960–1963) that had a swing axle suspension design which was prone to "tuck under" in certain circumstances. George Caramagna, a mechanic working on the suspension system, suggested installing a stabilizer (anti-roll or "anti-sway") bar, but was overruled by GM management. To make up for the cost-cutting lack of a front stabilizer bar, Corvairs required tire pressures which were outside of the tire manufacturers' recommended tolerances. The Corvair relied on an unusually high front to rear pressure differential (15 psi front, 26 psi rear, when cold; 18 psi and 30 psi hot), and if one inflated the tires equally, as was standard practice for all other cars at the time, the result was a dangerous oversteer. Despite proper tire pressures being more critical than for contemporaneous designs, Chevrolet salespeople and Corvair owners were not properly advised of the requirement and risk. According to the standards of the Tire and Rim Association, these recommended pressures caused the front tires to be overloaded whenever there were two or more passengers in the car.

An unadvertised at-cost option (#696) included upgraded springs and dampers, front anti-roll bars and rear-axle-rebound straps to prevent tuck-under. Aftermarket kits were also available, such as the EMPI Camber Compensator, for the knowledgeable owner. The suspension was modified for 1964 models, with inclusion of a standard front anti-roll bar and a transverse-mounted rear spring. In 1965, the totally redesigned four-link, fully independent rear suspension maintained a constant camber angle at the wheels. A redesign for the 1965 model eliminated the tuck-under crash tendency.

=== "Disaster deferred" ===
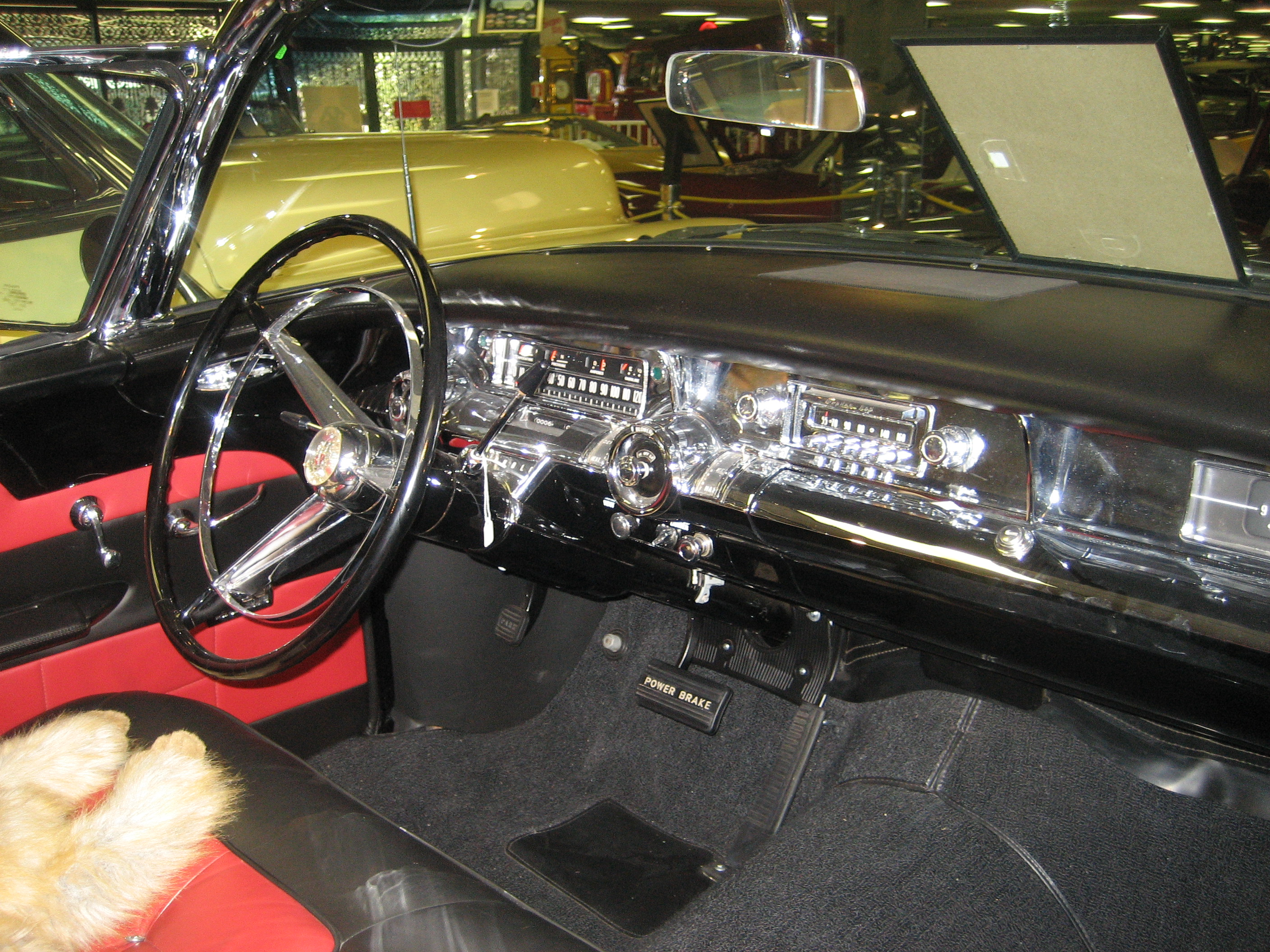
Chrome-finishing at the dashboard and a pillar of a 1957 Buick Roadmaster, a car that became infamous for suddenly losing brake-pressure

Chapter 2 levels criticism on auto design elements such as instrument panels and dashboards that were often brightly finished with chrome and glossy enamels which had potential to reflect sunlight or the headlights of oncoming motor vehicles into the driver's eyes. This problem, according to Nader, was well known to persons in the industry, but little was done to correct it.

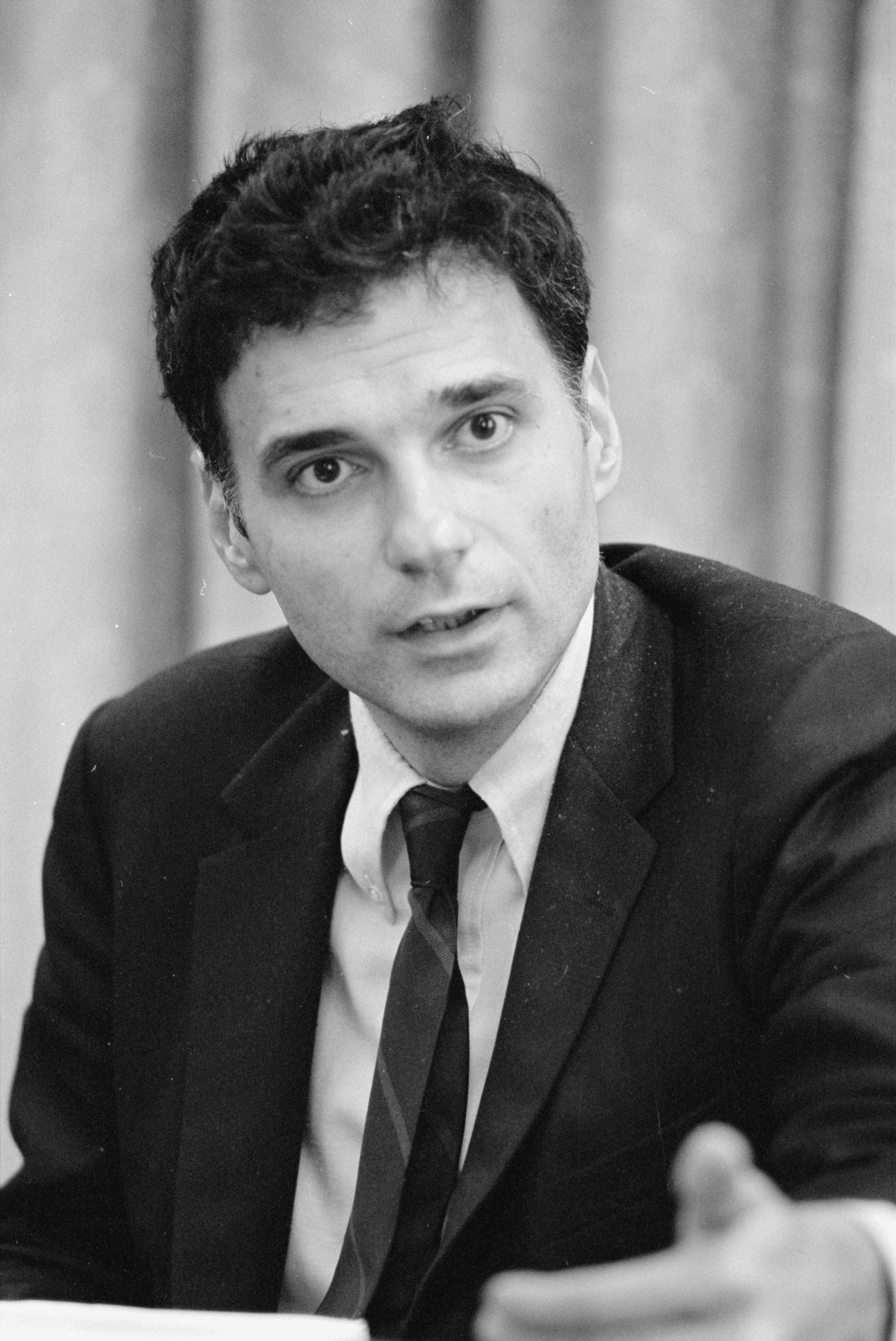
Ralph Nader in 1975

Nader also offered advice about the gear shift quadrants on earlier cars fitted with automatic transmissions. Several examples are given of people being run over, or cars becoming runaways because drivers were not familiar with the shift pattern, causing them to shift into reverse when intending to shift to low gear, or vice versa. Nader made an appeal to the auto industry to standardize gearshift patterns as a safety issue.

Early automatic transmissions, including GM's Hydra-Matic, Packard's Ultramatic, and Borg Warner's automatic used by a number of independent manufacturers (Rambler, Studebaker) used a pattern of "P N D L R", which put Reverse at the bottom of the quadrant, next to Low. Because it was difficult to tell by feel whether the lever was in "Low" or in "Reverse", drivers intending to select "Reverse" would frequently fail to move the lever far enough and shoot forwards. Alternately, drivers intending to select "Low" sometimes moved it too far into "Reverse" when intending to move forwards, and the car could ram into walls or buildings, damaging property and/or injuring people. In addition, other manufacturers, such as Chrysler, used a push-button selector to choose gear ranges.

Chevrolet's Powerglide, as used on the Corvair, used a "R N D L" pattern, which separated the Reverse from the Drive gears by Neutral in the ideal way, but which had no "P" selection, only providing a parking brake. Ford was the first to use the "P R N D L" pattern, which also separated Reverse from forward ranges by Neutral. Eventually, this pattern became the standard for all automatic-shift cars.

Chapter 2 also exposes workmanship problems and companies' failure to honor warranties.

=== "The second collision" ===
Chapter 3 documents the history of crash science focusing on the effect on the human body (the second collision) as it collides with the interior of the car as the car hits another object (the first collision). Nader claims that much knowledge was available to designers by the early 1960s but it was largely ignored within the American automotive industry. There are in-depth discussions about the steering assembly, instrument panel, windshield, passenger restraint, and the passenger compartment (which included everything from door strength to roll-over bars). Due to this, the "Nader bolt" was installed to reinforce doors.

=== "The power to pollute" ===
Chapter 4 documents the automobile's impact on air pollution and its contribution to smog, with a particular focus on Los Angeles.

=== "The engineers" ===
Chapter 5 is about Detroit automotive engineers' relative disinterest in road-safety improvements for fear of alienating the buyer or making cars too expensive, as compared to styling changes and the like. Nader said that annual cosmetic changes added, on average, about $700 to the consumer cost of a new car (equivalent to $7,200 in 2025). He compared this to an average expenditure in safety by the automotive companies of about twenty-three cents per car (equivalent to $2.35 in 2025).

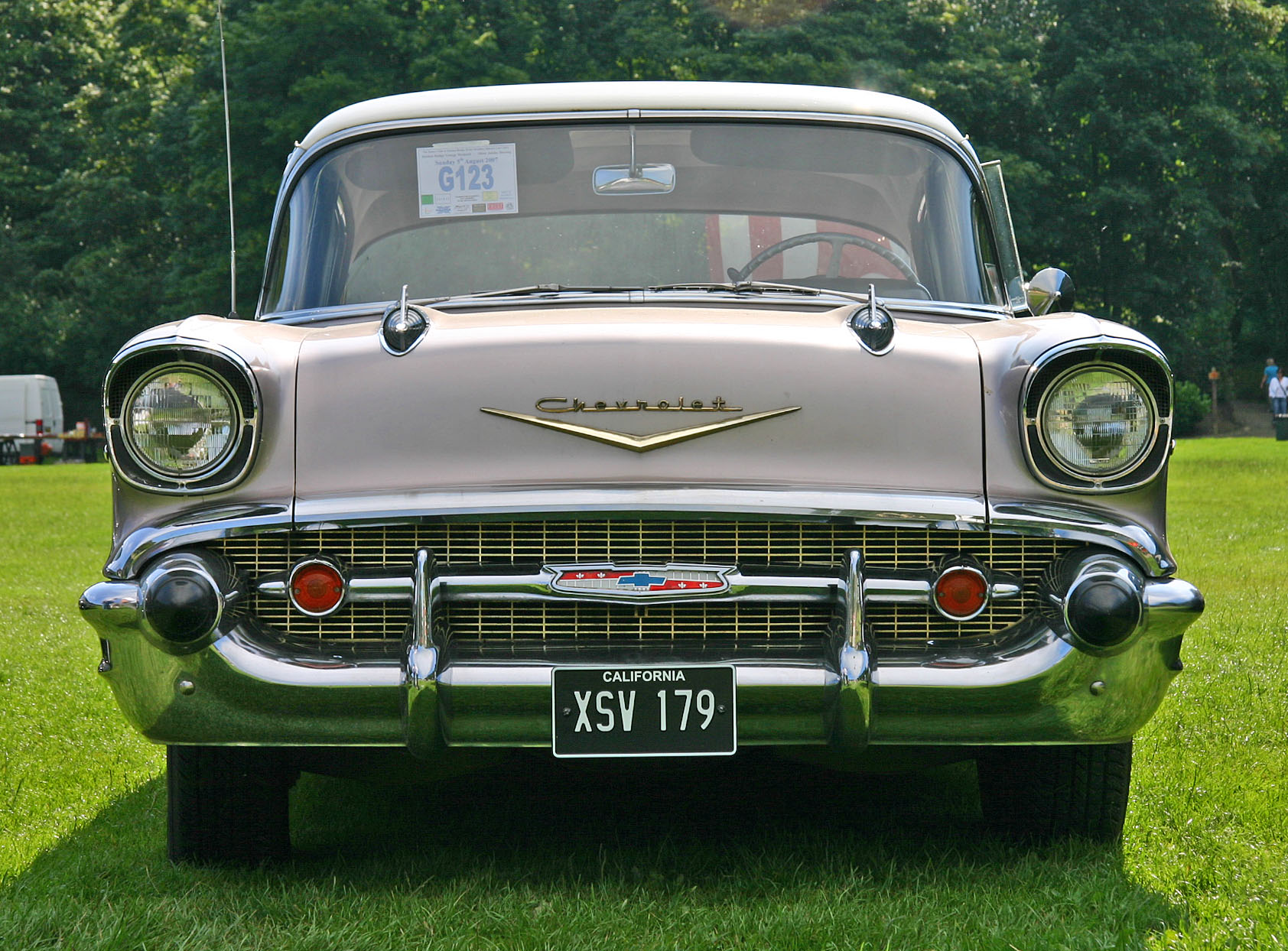
Unsafe at Any Speed claimed that aggressive styling like that of the 1957 Chevrolet Bel Air was hazardous to pedestrians.

=== "The stylists" ===
Chapter 6 explores the considerable ornamentation that appeared on cars, particularly in the late 1950s, and the focus on style. Of the 1950s designs, Nader points out that "bumpers shaped like sled-runners and sloping grille work above the bumpers, which give the effect of 'leaning into the wind,' increase ... the car's potential for exerting down-and-under pressures on the pedestrian."

=== "The traffic safety establishment" ===
Subtitled "Damn the driver and spare the car," Chapter 7 discusses the way the blame for vehicular crashes and harm was placed on the driver. The book says that the road safety mantra called the "Three E's" ("Engineering, Enforcement and Education") was created by the industry in the 1920s to distract attention from the real problems of vehicle safety, such as the fact that some were sold with tires that could not bear the weight of a fully loaded vehicle. To the industry, he said "Enforcement" and "Education" meant the driver, while "Engineering" was all about the road. As late as 1965, he noted that 320 million federal dollars were allocated to highway beautification, while just $500,000 was dedicated to highway safety.

=== "The coming struggle for safety" ===
Chapter 8, the concluding chapter, suggests that the automotive industry should be forced by the government to pay greater attention to safety in the face of mounting evidence about preventable death and injury.

== Reception ==
Unsafe at Any Speed was a bestseller in nonfiction from April through July 1966. It also prompted the passage of seat-belt laws in 49 states (all but New Hampshire) and a number of other road-safety initiatives.

=== Government response ===
U.S Senate hearings prompted by the book led to the creation of the United States Department of Transportation in 1966 and the predecessor agencies of the National Highway Traffic Safety Administration in 1970.

The book has continuing relevance: it addressed what Nader perceived as the political lobbying of the car industry to oppose new safety features, which was later seen in the 1990s with mandatory airbags in the United States, and industry efforts by the European Automobile Manufacturers Association (ACEA) to delay the introduction of crash tests in the European Union.

=== Industry response ===
In response to Nader's criticisms, GM attempted to sabotage Nader's reputation. It "(1) conducted a series of interviews with acquaintances of the plaintiff, 'questioning them about, and casting aspersions upon [his] political, social, racial and religious views; his integrity; his sexual proclivities and inclinations; and his personal habits'; (2) kept him under surveillance in public places for an unreasonable length of time; (3) caused him to be accosted by girls for the purpose of entrapping him into illicit relationships; (4) made threatening, harassing and obnoxious telephone calls to him; (5) tapped his telephone and eavesdropped, by means of mechanical and electronic equipment, on his private conversations with others; and (6) conducted a 'continuing' and harassing investigation of him."

On March 22, 1966, GM President James Roche was forced to appear before a United States Senate subcommittee and apologized to Nader for the company's campaign of harassment and intimidation. Nader sued GM in November 1966 for invasion of privacy. He won the case on appeal in January 1970 and was awarded $425,000, which he used to establish the Center for Auto Safety, a non-profit advocacy group. He went on to lobby for consumer rights, helping drive the creation of the U.S. Environmental Protection Agency and the passage of the Clean Air Act, among others.

Former GM executive and Chevrolet's general manager John DeLorean asserted in the book On a Clear Day You Can See General Motors (1979) that he believed Nader's criticisms were valid in the context of the rigidity and short-sightedness of General Motors' corporate culture.

In reference to this corporate culture, author Mike Knepper, in his book The Corvair Affair (1982), contends that GM executives never meant for harassment of Nader to go as far as it did and instead intended to simply gather routine data about a critic, but like a game of "telephone", the mandate for their private investigators ballooned out of proportion.

=== Criticisms of the book ===
The U.S. Department of Transportation issued a press release dated August 12, 1972, setting out the findings of 1971 NHTSA testing—after the Corvair had been out of production for more than three years. The National Highway Traffic Safety Administration (NHTSA) had conducted a series of comparative tests in 1971 studying the handling of the 1963 Corvair and four contemporary cars, a Ford Falcon, Plymouth Valiant, Volkswagen Beetle, Renault Dauphine—along with a second generation Corvair with revised suspension design. The subsequent 143-page report (PB 211-015, available from NTIS) reviewed a series of actual handling tests designed to evaluate the handling and stability under extreme conditions; a review of national accident data compiled by insurance companies and traffic authorities for the cars in the test—and a review of related General Motors/Chevrolet internal letters, memos, tests, reports, etc. regarding the Corvair's handling. NHTSA went on to contract a three-person advisory panel of independent professional engineers to review the scope and competency of their tests. This review panel then issued its own 24-page report (PB 211-014, available from NTIS), which concluded that "the 1960–63 Corvair compares favorably with contemporary vehicles used in the tests ... the handling and stability performance of the 1960–63 Corvair does not result in an abnormal potential for loss of control or rollover, and it is at least as good as the performance of some contemporary vehicles both foreign and domestic."

Conservative economist and American Enterprise Institute fellow Thomas Sowell contended that Nader was dismissive of the trade-off between safety and affordability. According to Sowell, Nader also did not mention that motor vehicle death rates per 100 million passenger miles fell over the years from 17.9 in 1925 to 5.5 in 1965.

Journalist David E. Davis, in a 2009 article in Automobile Magazine, criticized Nader for purportedly focusing on the Corvair while ignoring other contemporary vehicles with swing-axle rear suspensions, including cars from Porsche, Mercedes-Benz and Volkswagen, though just before the 1972 report Nader's Center for Auto Safety published a book critical of the Beetle, Small—On Safety: The Designed-In Dangers of the Volkswagen.

In 2005, the book received an honorable mention by conservative publication Human Events for its "Most Harmful Books of the 19th and 20th Centuries", meaning two or more out of fifteen conservative thinkers voted for it.

== See also ==
- High and Mighty (book)
