= Mark Rosekind =

American psychologist (born 1955)

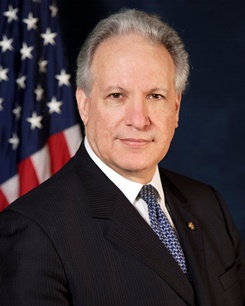

Administrator of the National Highway Traffic Safety Administration
- In office 2014–2016

Personal details
- Born: 1955 (age 70–71) San Francisco, California, U.S.
- Party: Democratic
- Education: Stanford University (BS); Yale University (MS, PhD)

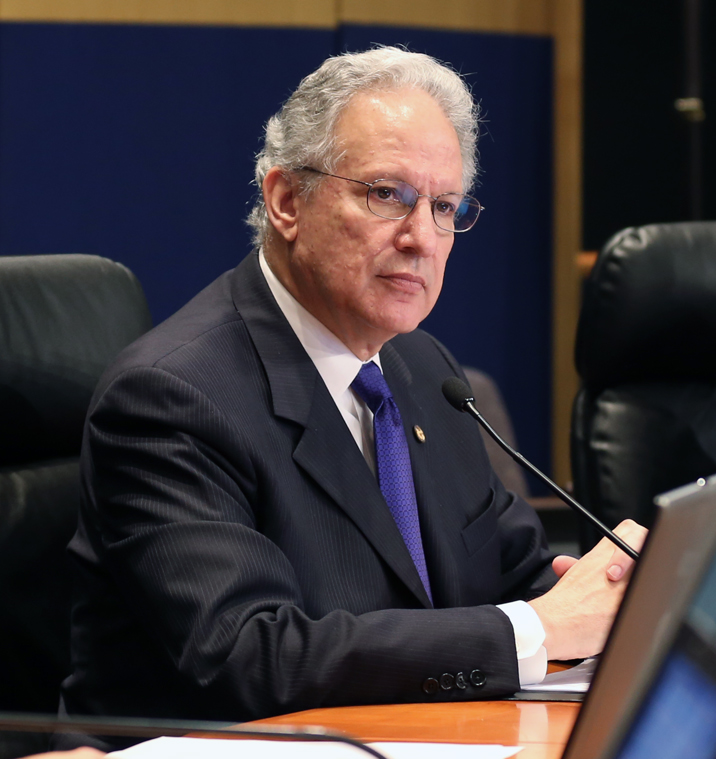
Rosekind in 2012

Mark Rosekind (born 1955) served as the 15th Administrator of the National Highway Traffic Safety Administration (NHTSA). He was appointed by President Obama and sworn in in December 2014, replacing David L. Strickland who resigned in January 2014. NHTSA was run by David J. Friedman, the deputy administrator, in the intervening time.

== Personal life ==
Rosekind was born in San Francisco in 1955. In 1958 his father, a motorcycle policeman, died in the line of duty while chasing a speeding vehicle.

Rosekind completed his undergraduate degree at Stanford in 1977. In 1987, he earned his doctoral degree in clinical psychology from Yale and then continued his education with two years of post-doctoral work at Brown University Medical School.

== Career ==
From 1990 to 1997, Rosekind worked at NASA as part of the Fatigue Countermeasures Group and eventually as the group's director. In 1997, Rosekind started a consulting company called Alertness Solutions which focused on providing sleep and alertness strategies to a wide variety of professions.

In June 2010, Rosekind was appointed as a board member to the National Transportation Safety Board (NTSB) and served there until December 2014. As a member of the NTSB, he was on-scene for seven major transportation accidents including the Midland train crash and the 2011 Reno Air Races crash.

Prior to Rosekind's appointment, NHTSA had been considered by some as "tentative in taking action, slow to identify problems and reluctant to use its full legal powers against the industry it regulates." In his first few months of office, he led major investigations of Fiat Chrysler and Takata Corporation and extended oversight of General Motors' safety operations. These efforts and others have led to the largest vehicle recall in history. In contrast to the prior characterizations of NHTSA, Rosekind's brief tenure has been considered "aggressive" with respect to pursuing issues and taking action for the public's safety. The automobile industry has responded positively to his leadership: Automotive News named Rosekind the 2015 Industry Leader of The Year (a distinction typically reserved for auto industry executives). In April, 2017, Rosekind became chief safety innovation officer by Zoox, a driverless car startup.
