= Richard Grossman (publisher) =

American publisher (1921–2014)

Richard Lee Grossman (June 26, 1921 – January 27, 2014) was an American publisher.

== Early life, education and military service ==
He was born in Chicago and attended University of Pennsylvania, but left before graduating. He served in the Army Signal Corps and worked in advertising before going into the publishing business.

== Publishing career ==
He started his own company, Grossman Publishers, after working for Simon & Schuster. Grossman Publishers was sold to Viking Press in 1968. Later he worked in alternative medicine and psychotherapy, including as director of the Center for Health in Medicine at the Montefiore Hospital and Medical Center; at Beth Israel Medical Center, and the Smith Center for Healing and the Arts’s program for cancer patients.

Publisher of Ralph Nader's best-seller Unsafe at Any Speed: The Designed-in Dangers of the American Automobile, Grossman went on to publish other books by Mr. Nader and his associates on air and water pollution, food and drugs, pesticides and coal-mine safety, all of which helped lead to the passage of major legislation.

== Selected books ==
- Choosing and Changing: A Guide to Self-Reliance (1978)
- The Other Medicines (1985)
- A Year With Emerson: A Daybook (2003)
- The Tao of Emerson (2007) by Ralph Waldo Emerson, Lao Tse (Authors), Richard Grossman (Editor, Introduction), Modern Library, ISBN 0679643397.
