= Keith Bradsher =

American journalist

Keith Bradsher is an American business and economics reporter and the Beijing bureau chief of The New York Times. He was previously the Shanghai bureau chief and the chief Hong Kong correspondent since 2002, reporting on Greater China, Southeast Asia and South Asia on topics including economic trends, manufacturing, energy, health issues and the environment. He has won several awards for his reporting and was part of a team of New York Times reporters who won the 2013 Pulitzer Prize for Explanatory Reporting for a series of 10 articles about the business practices of Apple and other technology companies.

== Education ==
Bradsher has a public policy master's degree in economics from Princeton University and received his bachelor's degree with highest honors in economics as a Morehead Scholar at the University of North Carolina at Chapel Hill. He also attended Hong Kong International School for 4 years.

== Career ==
Bradsher joined the Times in 1989. Before his Asian assignment, he was the newspaper's Detroit bureau chief for nearly six years, a Washington D.C. correspondent covering international trade and then the Federal Reserve for five years, and a reporter in New York covering the airline and telecommunications industries for two years.

He is known for numerous articles, starting in 1997, about the consequences of crashes between sport utility vehicles (SUVs) and other vehicles - including extra damage, injuries, and deaths. He cited statistical evidence that high-riding SUVs may contribute greater force to smaller vehicles and their occupants when hit, with the extra damage being caused by the vehicles' height and design and not just their greater weight. The articles led to the development by automakers of a variety of measures, including hollow, impact-absorbing steel bars below and behind SUV bumpers that Ford Motor Company nicknamed "Bradsher Bars." He later expanded this into a book: High and Mighty: SUVs - The World's Most Dangerous vehicles and how they got that way. A 2011 study by the insurance industry found that the redesigns had sharply reduced the death rate in cars hit by SUVs and pickup trucks. Bradsher is also known for writing extensively in 2009 and 2010 that China was passing the West in the production of wind turbines and solar panels, and for his coverage in November and December, 2013, of the aftermath of Typhoon Haiyan in the Philippines.

== Awards ==
Bradsher shared the Pulitzer Prize for Explanatory Reporting in 2013 with other New York Times reporters for their work the preceding year on Apple's business practices in a changing global economy. Bradsher won the George Polk Award for national reporting on his coverage of sport utility vehicles (SUVs) during 1997 and was a finalist for the Pulitzer Prize the same year. Later, he published a book on SUVs called High and Mighty which won the New York Public Library Helen Bernstein Award. He won the Society of Publishers in Asia (SOPA) award for coverage of avian flu in the area. He won the Asia Society’s Osborn Elliott Award and the Overseas Press Club's Malcolm Forbes Award in 2010, for coverage of clean energy in China. The Asia Society summarized the work on China he was being honored for: "Through a dozen front-page articles, Bradsher revealed how China, as one of the world's largest polluters, has also begun to develop some of the world's most advanced solutions to global warming and has pursued them aggressively."

== Bibliography ==
- High and Mighty: SUVs - The World's Most Dangerous vehicles and how they got that way, PublicAffairs, 2002.
