= High and Mighty (book) =

Book by Keith Bradsher

- Author: Keith Bradsher
- Language: English
- Genre: Non-fiction
- Publisher: PublicAffairs
- Publication date: 2002
- ISBN: 1586481231

High and Mighty: SUVs - The World's Most Dangerous vehicles and how they got that way (ISBN 1-58648-123-1) is a book by Keith Bradsher which details the tax breaks, protectionism and policy decisions which led to the rise of the sport utility vehicle in modern America, and the poor safety record of the first and second generation of SUVs.

It is polemical in tone but develops its arguments with references. Specifically, it notes that the SUV is the car of choice for many of the nation's most self-centered people; and the bigger the SUV, the less gracious its owner is likely to be.

== See also ==
- Unsafe at Any Speed
