= Nader v. General Motors Corp. =

American court case

Nader v. General Motors Corp., 25 N.Y.2d 560, 307 N.Y.S.2d 647, 255 N.E.2d 765 (N.Y. 1970) was a court case on the invasion of privacy and intentional infliction of emotional distress.

== Facts ==
The author and automobile safety lecturer Ralph Nader claimed that General Motors had "conduct[ed] a campaign of intimidation against him in order to 'suppress plaintiff's criticism of and prevent his disclosure of information' about its products" regarding his book Unsafe at Any Speed.

== Judgment ==
The court held that mere information gathering is not sufficient for action under intrusion upon seclusion tort: "privacy is invaded only if the information sought is of a confidential nature and the defendant's conduct was unreasonably intrusive."

Judge Brietel concluded that GM's actions "constitute intrusion upon privacy".

The court concluded that private detectives hired by General Motors to follow Nader were in their rights to follow him into a bank, but they crossed a line when looking over his shoulder to read the denominations of the bills he was withdrawing.
