= Pacific City Lines =

Streetcar system company

Logo of Pacific City Lines Parent Company, National City Lines.

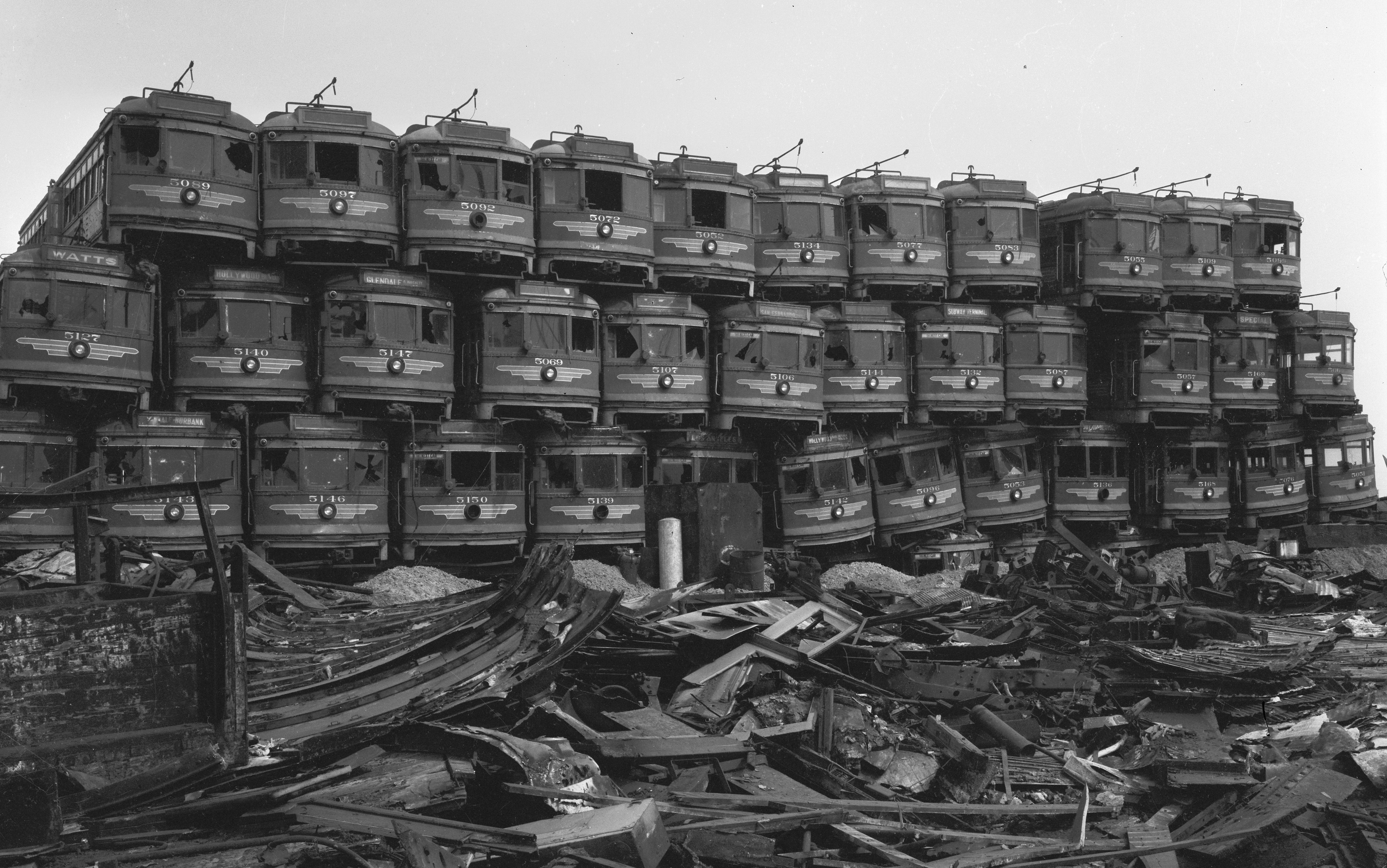
A stack of working trolleys awaiting destruction on Terminal Island during Pacific City Lines executive Jesse L. Haugh's tenure at Pacific Electric during the 1950s.

Pacific City Lines was a company formed in 1937 as a subsidiary of National City Lines, based in Oakland, California. Its function was to purchase streetcar systems in the western United States as part of what became known as the Great American streetcar scandal.

General Motors made investments in 1938.

From 1943 to 1944, Pacific City Lines acquired all of the Streetcars in Sacramento from the Pacific Gas and Electric Company and other former owners, subsequently terminating streetcar service throughout the Sacramento metropolitan area in less than three years, mirroring the practices of NCL and the numerous other transportation holding companies owned and controlled by GM, Chevron/Standard Oil of California, Firestone and other Automotive and Oil Industry giants across the United States.

This business practice was well exemplified by Jesse L. Haugh, the president of Pacific City Lines from 1942 to 1946 during which he was also involved in dismantling the Key System in the San Francisco Bay Area, along with numerous other U.S. electric railways looted and liquidated across the country.

In 1947 Pacific City Lines was indicted alongside General Motors and numerous other companies and executives on two counts:

- conspiring to acquire control of a number of transit companies, forming a transportation monopoly
- conspiring to monopolize sales of buses and supplies to companies owned or controlled by National City Lines, Inc., or Pacific City Lines, Inc.

The 1947 convictions against the conspirators named in United States v. National City Lines, Pacific City Lines and the other conspirators was subsequently upheld on appeal.

While Pacific City Lines was folded into its parent company following the 1948 conviction under the Sherman Antitrust Act, the work of dismantling U.S. light rail systems nonetheless continued into at least the 1950s under the auspices of other holding companies, such as Metropolitan Coach Lines in Los Angeles.

The scheme involved the obliteration of Light rail transit in cities across the country, and conversion to diesel bus services. Haugh would go on to gain control of the Pacific Electric Railway, acquiring it through a company of his called Metropolitan Coach Lines, which promptly abandoned the formerly robust Interurban system in its entirety.

Metropolitan Coach Lines is often confused with the Los Angeles Metropolitan Transit Authority (LAMTA) and today's Los Angeles Metro, but was a distinct private company operating simultaneously to LAMTA (after 1951) and operating a scheme identical to the one National/Pacific City Lines and other NCL subsidiaries are known for throughout the 1950s. Only after the Pacific Electric had been almost completely destroyed did Haugh sell his company to the Los Angeles County public agency associated with the name today.

== See also ==
- General Motors streetcar conspiracy
- National City Lines
- Key System
- Pacific Electric Railway
