= List of hotels in Los Angeles =

This is a list of hotels in Los Angeles (including the Greater Los Angeles Area).

== Hotels in Los Angeles ==
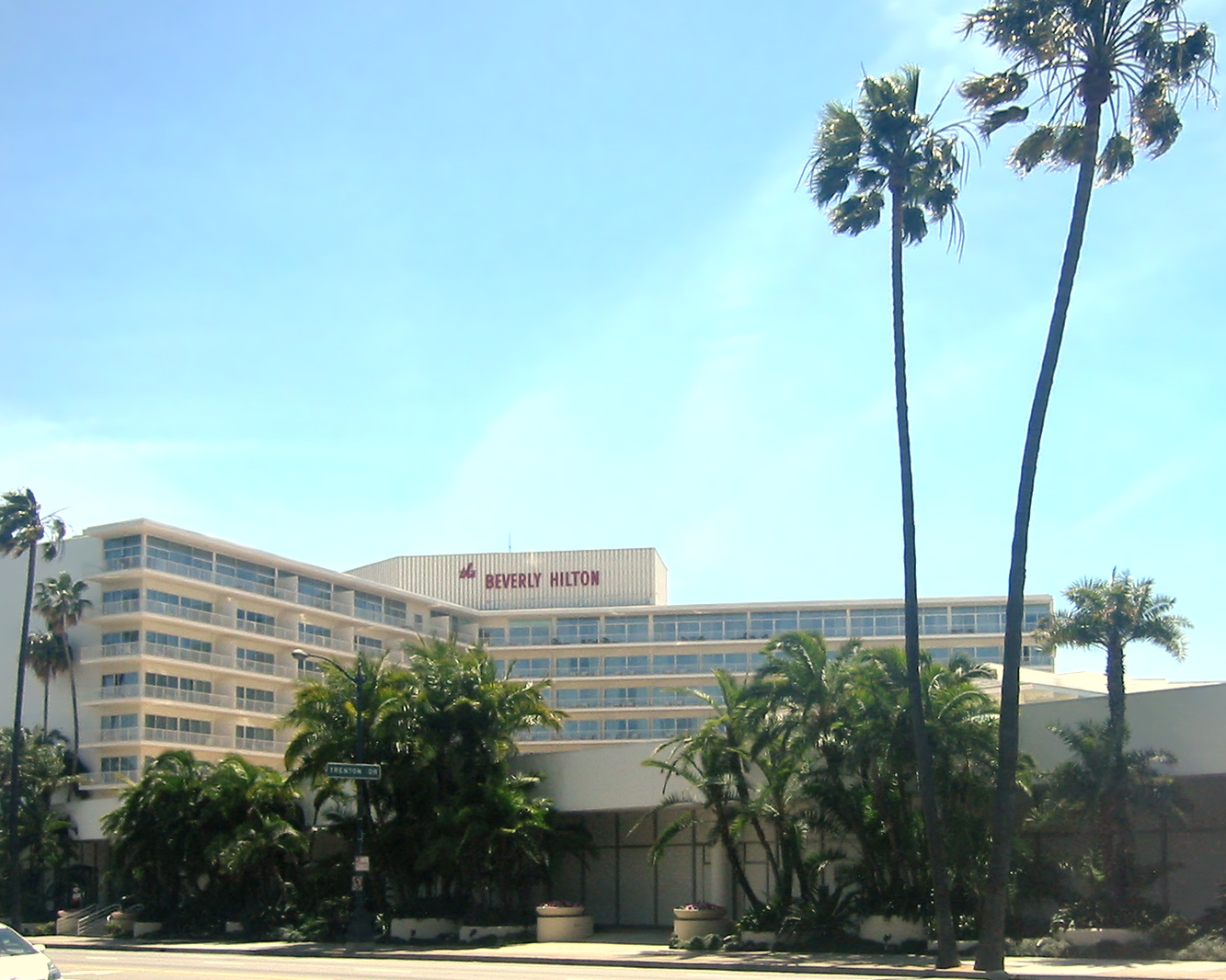
The Beverly Hilton

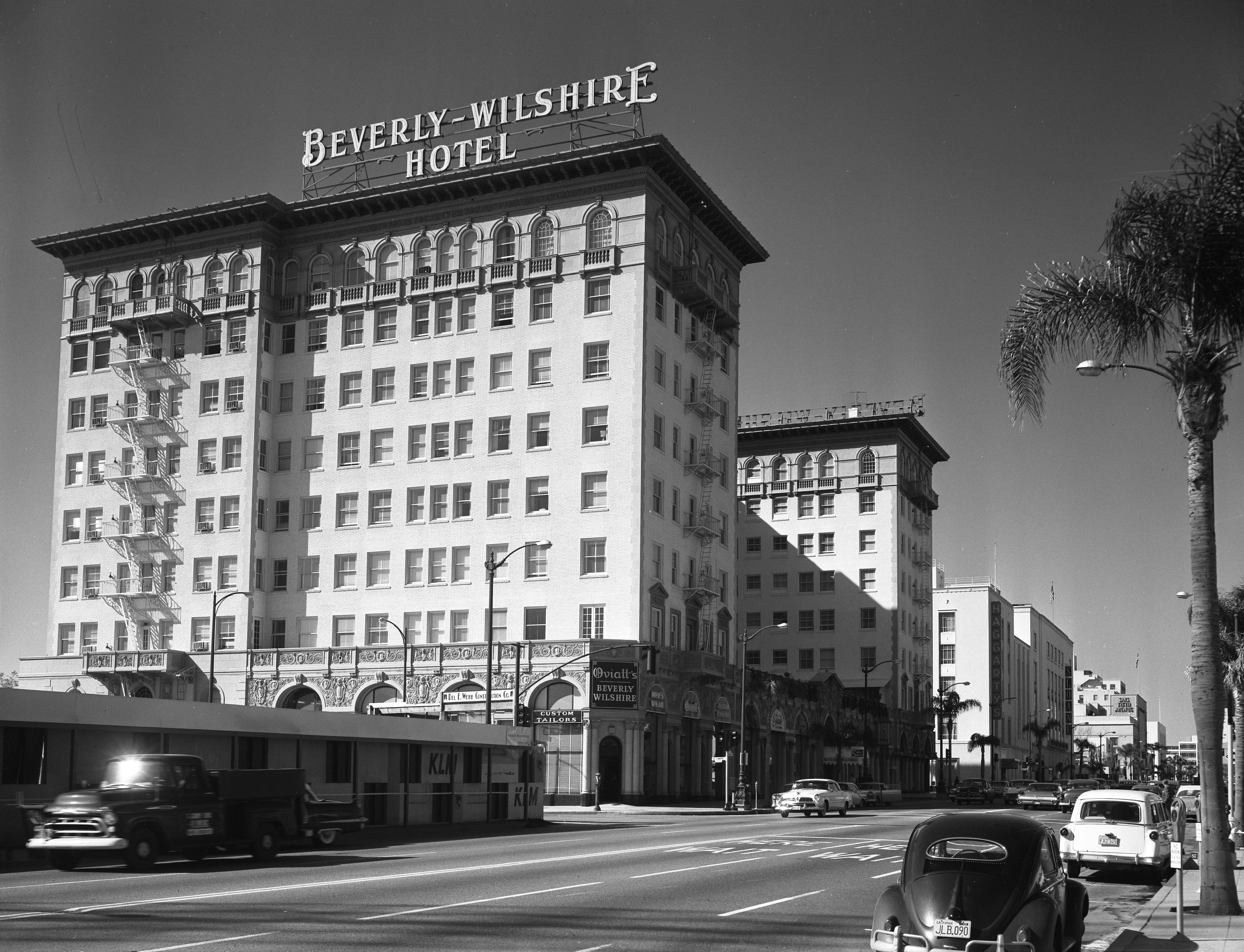
The Beverly Wilshire Hotel in 1959

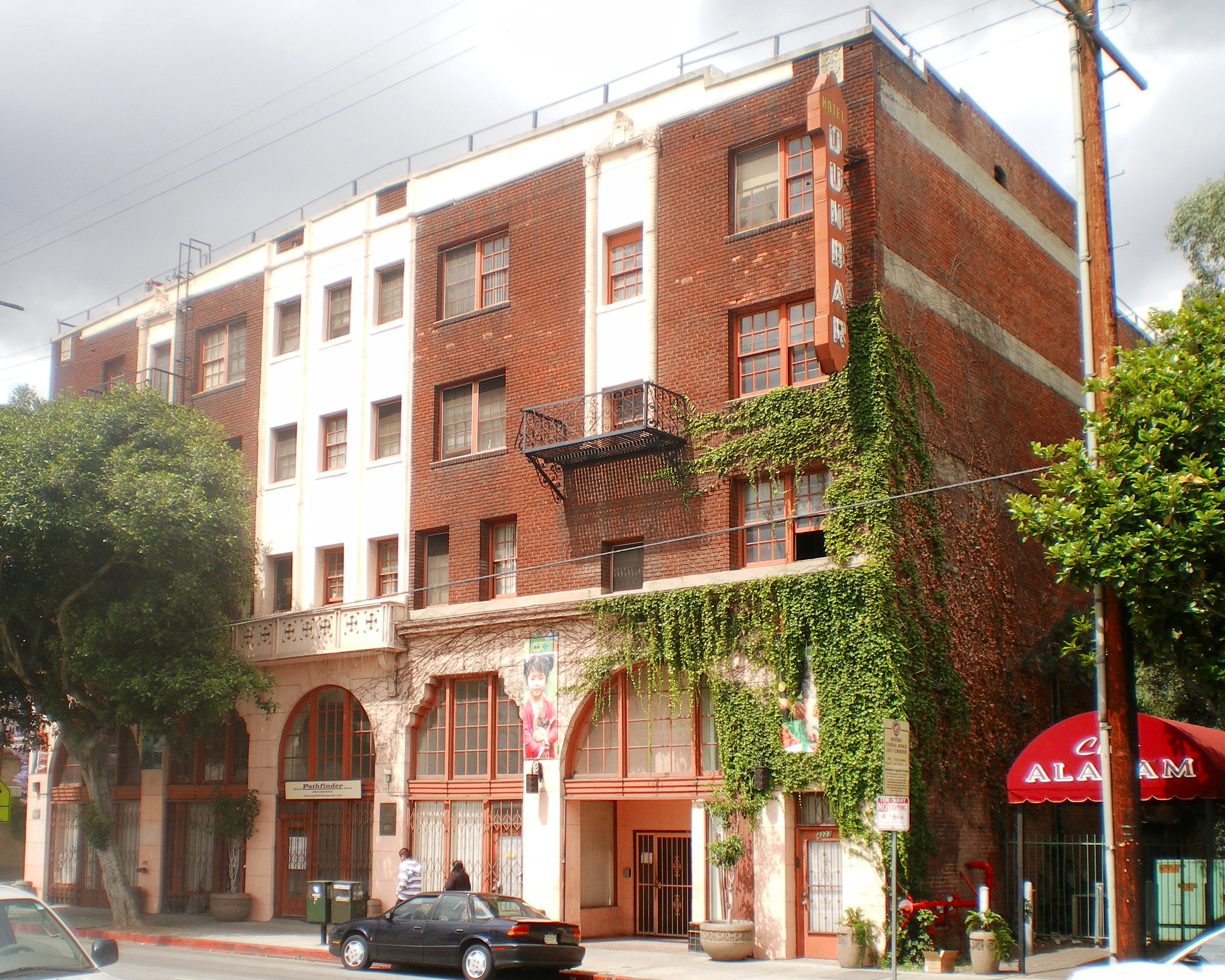
The Dunbar Hotel was originally named Hotel Somerville.

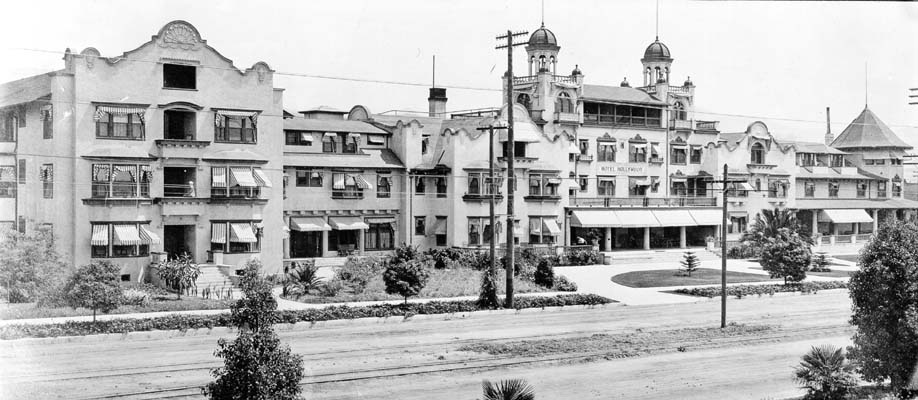
The Hollywood Hotel in 1905

- Alan Hotel
- Ambassador Hotel
- Andaz West Hollywood
- The Beverly Hills Hotel
- The Beverly Hilton
- Beverly Wilshire Hotel
- Boyle Hotel – Cummings Block
- Cecil Hotel
- Century Plaza Hotel
- Chateau Marmont
- Crowne Plaza: Los Angeles-Commerce Casino
- Culver Hotel
- Delphi Hotel, The (formerly the Downtown Standard Hotel (2002-2023))
- DoubleTree by Hilton Hotel Los Angeles Downtown
- Dunbar Hotel
- Fremont Hotel, Los Angeles
- Glen-Holly Hotel
- Hollywood Hotel
- Hollywood Melrose Hotel
- Hollywood Roosevelt Hotel
- Hotel Alexandria
- Hotel Bel-Air
- Hotel Chancellor
- Hotel Indigo Los Angeles Downtown
- InterContinental: Los Angeles Downtown
- Los Angeles Marriott
- Knickerbocker Hotel
- L'Ermitage Beverly Hills
- Millennium Biltmore Hotel
- Mondrian Los Angeles
- Monte Vista Hotel
- Park Plaza Hotel
- The Peninsula Beverly Hills
- Pico House
- Regency Plaza Suites
- Sheraton Town House/Sheraton West
- Sportsmen's Lodge
- Sunset Marquis Hotel
- Sunset Tower
- Superior Oil Company Building
- Westin Bonaventure Hotel
- Wilshire Grand Center

== See also ==
- Lists of hotels – hotel list articles on Wikipedia
