= Colegrove, Los Angeles =

Colegrove
- Neighborhood of Los Angeles
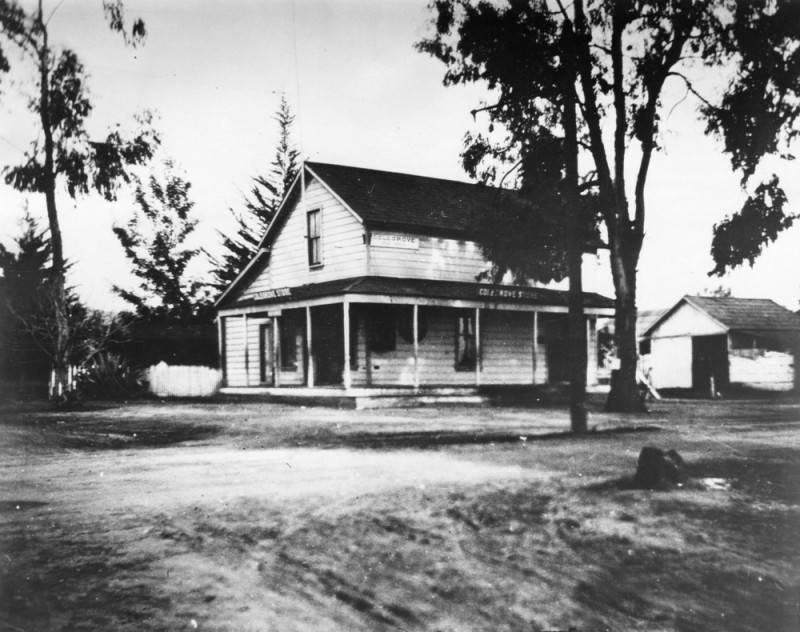
- Colegrove post office and store on SM Blvd. c. 1900 (Los Angeles Public Library photo 00071367)
- Interactive map of Colegrove
- Coordinates: 34.090867°N 118.3288137°W
- Country: United States
- State: California
- County: Los Angeles
- City: Los Angeles
- Named after: Olive Colegrove Cole
- Time zone: UTC-8 (PST)
  - Summer (DST): UTC-7 (PDT)
- Zip codes: 90038
- Area code: 323

Colegrove is a former settlement located near the present day intersection of Santa Monica Boulevard and Vine Street in Los Angeles, California.

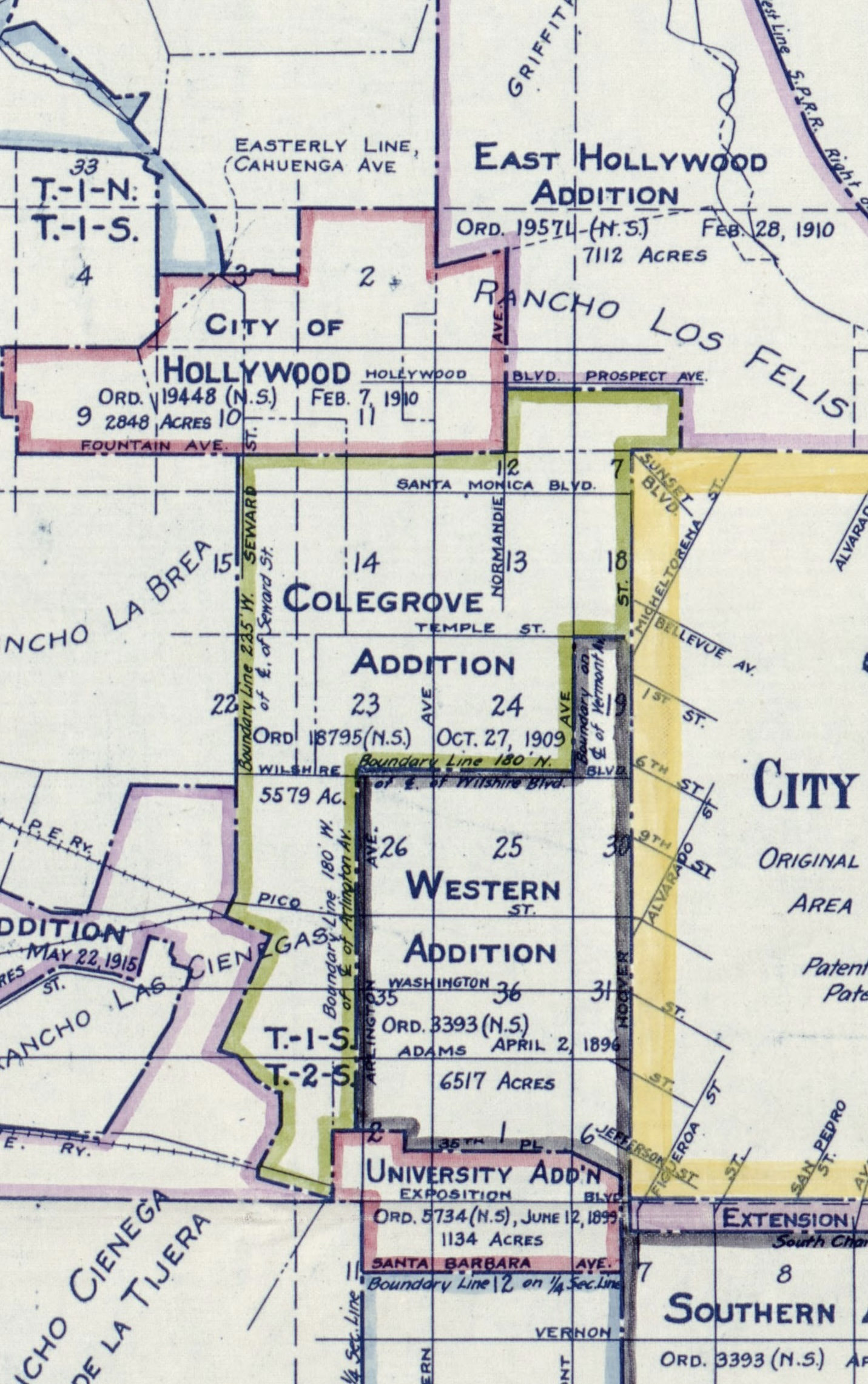
Colegrove Addition, 1909 annexation to City of Los Angeles (mapped 1916)

In 1914 it was described as being south of Hollywood and north of Melrose Avenue.

The settlement was founded by Cornelius Cole on land deeded to him by Henry Hancock that had once been part of the Rancho La Brea. A post office was first built at Colegrove in 1884, predating the post office in Hollywood by several years. Colegrove was named for Cole's wife, Olive Colegrove Cole, and the Cole family gave their name to several streets in the Colegrove area, including Cole St., Willoughby Ave., Eleanor St. and Seward St.

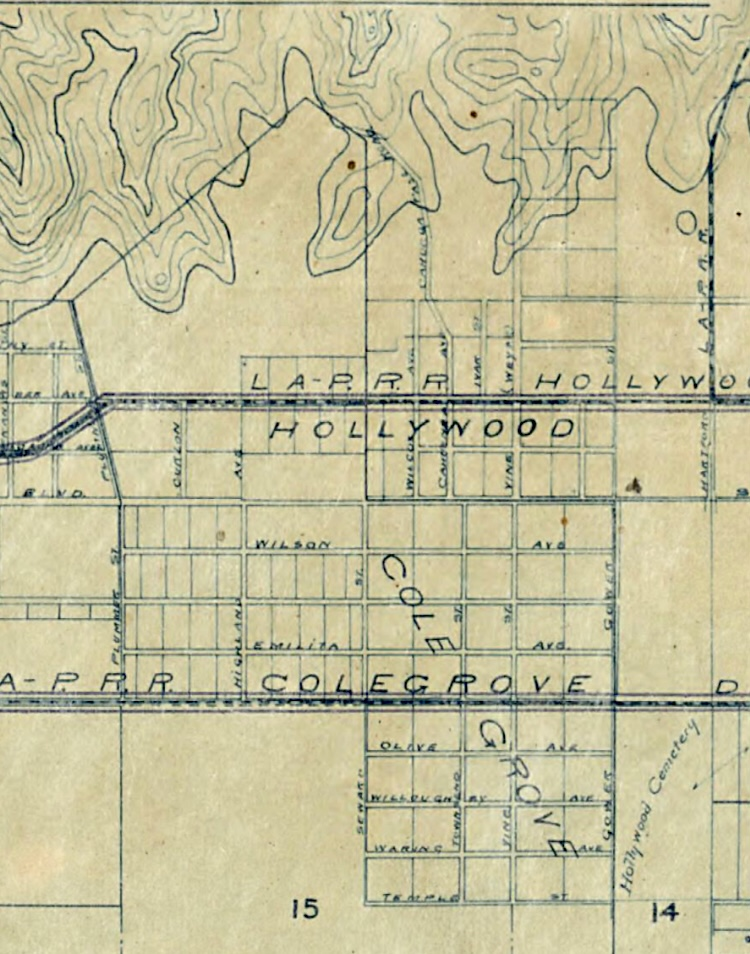
Colegrove c. 1900 on LAPRR route map

In the 1890s, the Los Angeles Pacific Railroad came to Colegrove. This railroad was eventually incorporated in the Pacific Electric Railway's Owensmouth, San Fernando and Sherman lines.

Colegrove produced lemons, and asphaltum was mined from "wells on the Hancock ranch, near Colegrove."

Colegrove Addition was annexed to Los Angeles on October 22, 1909.

In 1912, a reading room opened in Colegrove; this library would be replaced by what is now the John C. Fremont Branch Library.

In more recent years, the area is known as Hancock Park.

== See also ==
- Radium Sulphur Springs
