= Moonstone Beach =

Beach in California from the late 1880s to the early 1920s

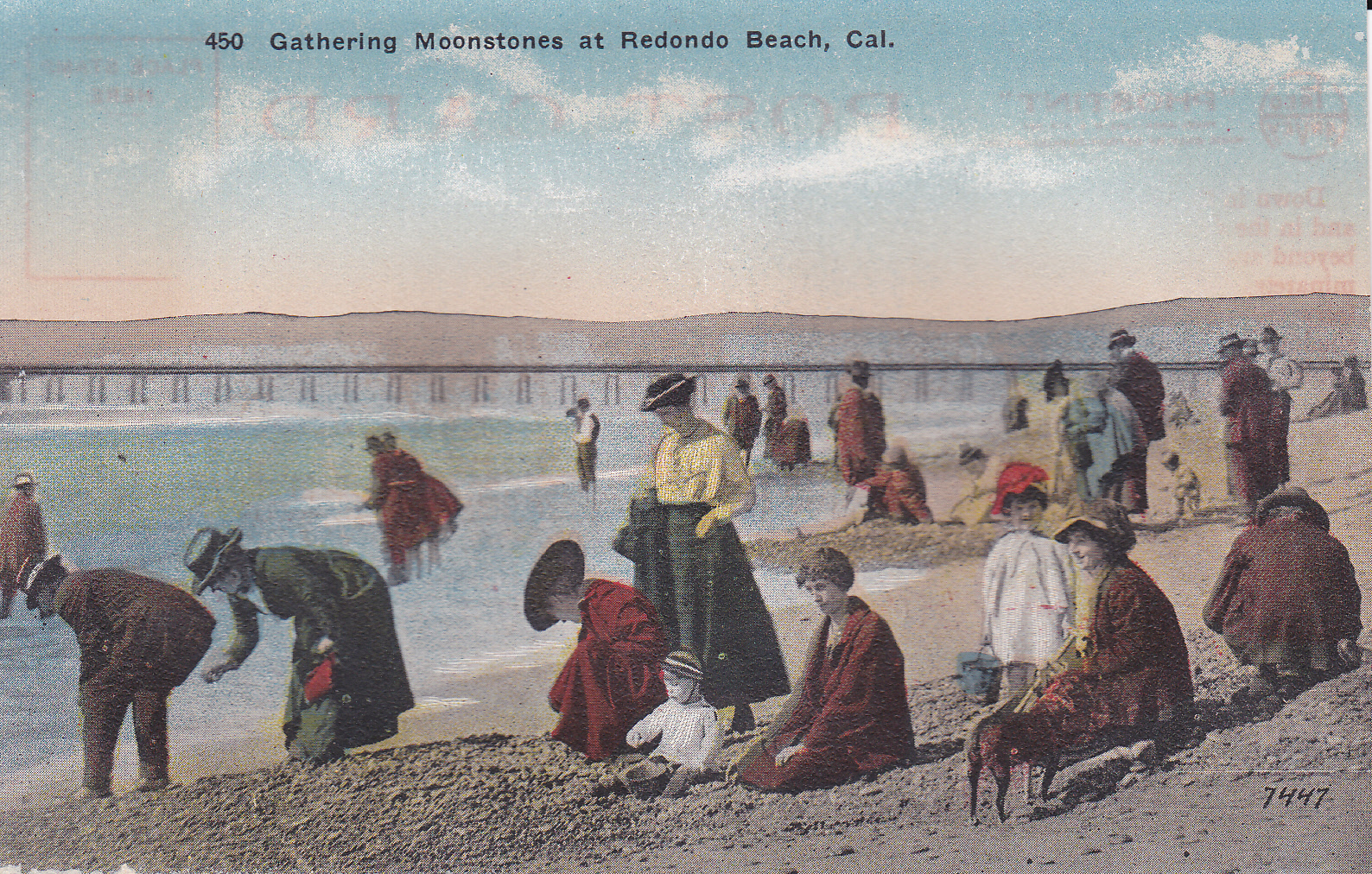
Moonstone Beach

Moonstone Beach was a tourist attraction in the beach community of Redondo Beach, California from the late 1880s to the early 1920s.

== Historical attraction ==
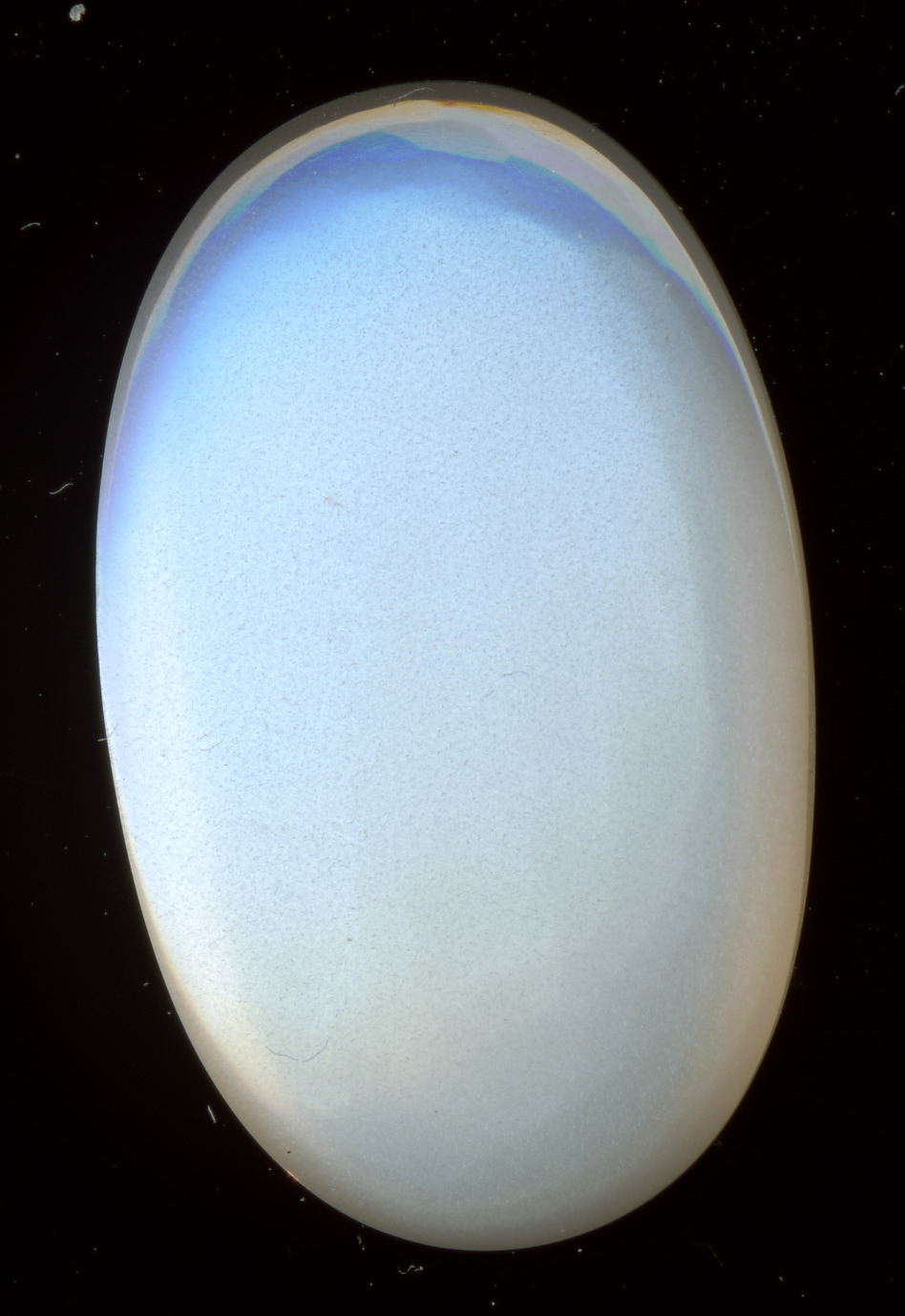
Polished moonstone specimen

Storms had deposited the moonstones along the beach from the Hermosa Beach city boundary south to about Diamond Street in Redondo Beach. Moonstones belong to the mineral family of feldspars that provide almost two-thirds of all stones on Earth. As the City of Redondo Beach took shape, visitors day-tripping from Los Angeles as well as tourists from the East Coast gathered the moonstones from the many mounds of gemstones washed ashore. It was a popular pastime for amateurs and gemologists alike. Although not very attractive in their natural state, the stones could be cut and polished into beautiful jewelry. One such case involved a local carpenter who sent a moonstone brooch in 1911 to his fiancé living in New York City. The carpenter persuaded his fiancé to join him in Southern California as his bride as he bragged about the beautiful moonstones washing up on the local beaches.

== Over-harvesting and decline ==
Builders soon found that the stones were useful for more than just jewelry. The sand and stones became components of streets, sidewalks and foundations. It is believed that 10,000 loads of the stones were crushed and used in the foundation of the Southern California Edison plant built in Redondo Beach in 1907. At the urging of the Redondo Beach Chamber, the Los Angeles & Redondo Railway Co. served notice to companies hauling away the sand and stones to discontinue the practice. The desire was to preserve the Moonstone Beach as a tourist attraction. Much of the damage had already been done.

With the addition of breakwaters, dredging, and a harbor in the late 1950s, the contour of the Redondo Beach waterfront has changed and moonstones are no longer deposited along its shores.

== Legacy ==
Due to the popularity of the gemstones, local streets were named to honor Moonstone Beach in the late 1880s. Beginning just south of the popular beach, streets running east–west feature gemstone names alphabetically such as Agate, Beryl, Carnelian, Diamond, Emerald, Garnet, Jasper, Opal, Pearl, Ruby, Sapphire, and Topaz.

In commemoration of the popular beach, the City of Redondo Beach has designated a small parcel of land within the harbor as Moonstone Park.

== See also ==
- Cambria, California, the home of another Moonstone Beach
