= Los Angeles Pacific Railroad =

California interurban and freight routes (1896–1911)

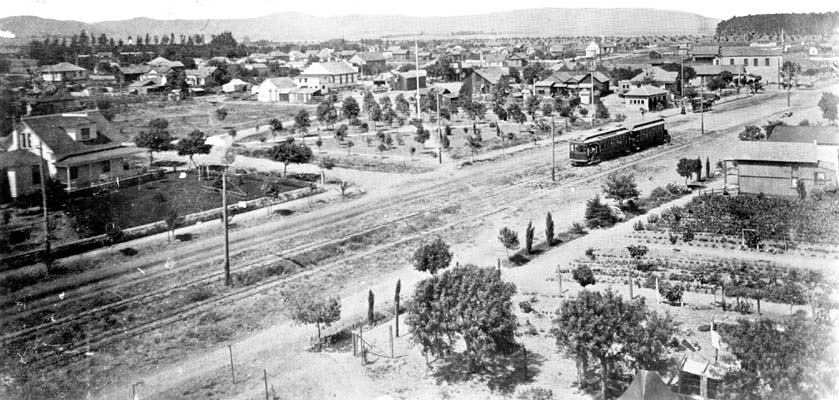
A 60-Class LAP streetcar and 40-Class trailer on Santa Monica Boulevard in Sawtelle at the National Soldier's Home, c. 1901

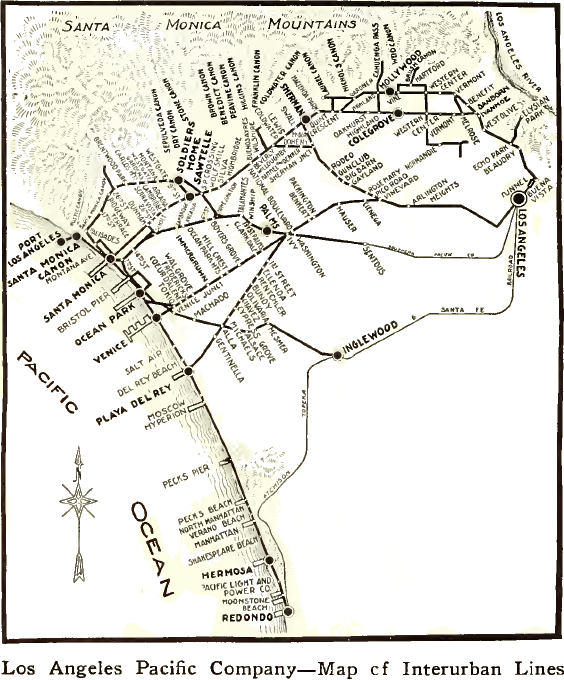
Los Angeles Pacific Railroad map, 1909

The Los Angeles Pacific Railroad (1896−1911) (LAP) was an electric public transit and freight railway system in Los Angeles County, California. At its peak it had 230 miles (370 km) of track extending from Downtown Los Angeles to the Westside, Santa Monica, and the South Bay towns along Santa Monica Bay.

== History ==
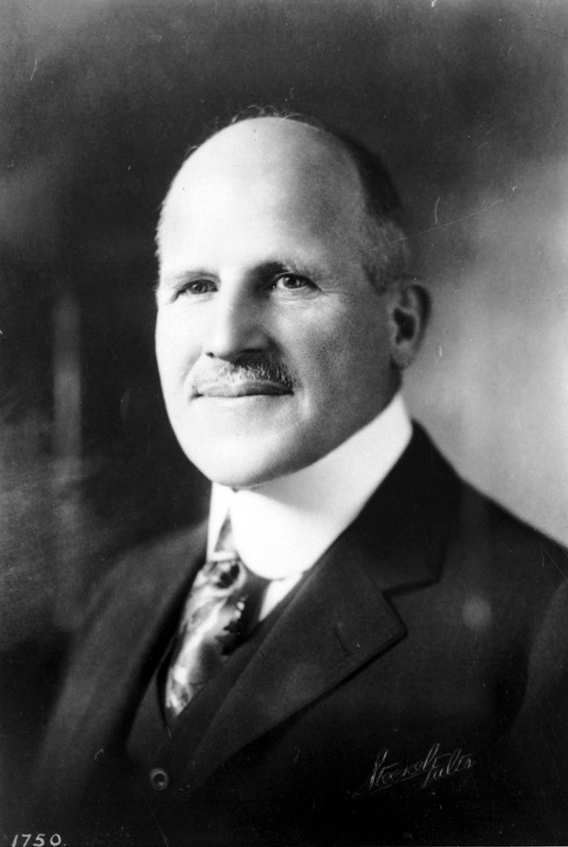
Moses H. Sherman

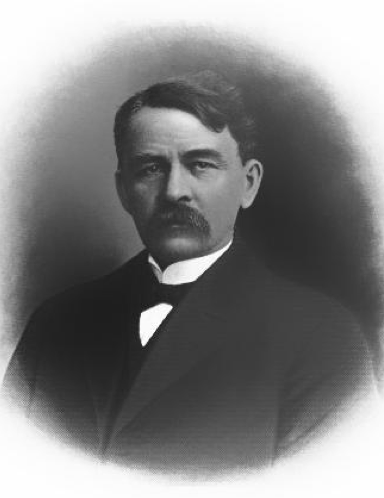
Eli P. Clark

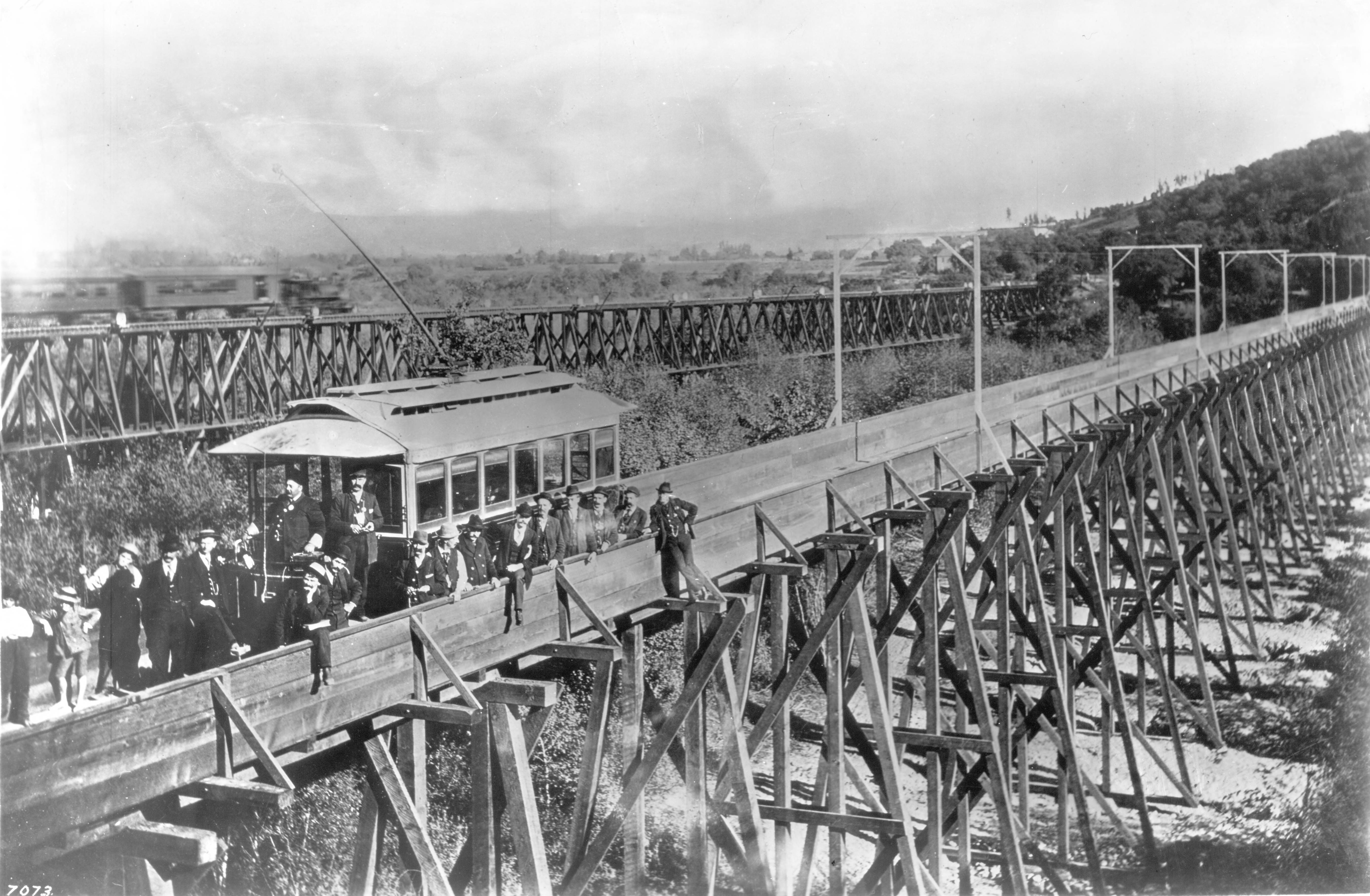
View of the first Pasadena and Los Angeles Electric Railway car over Arroyo Seco near the Cawston Ostrich Farm, on March 7, 1895

=== Sherman and Clark ===
Originally a teacher from Vermont, Moses Sherman had engaged in a variety of activities in the Arizona Territory, one of which was creating a street railway in Phoenix, Arizona. He was interested in the possibilities such a system offered in Los Angeles. After his arrival in Los Angeles in 1890 Sherman and his brother-in-law, Eli P. Clark, consolidated old lines and created new lines for a narrow-gauge street railway called the Los Angeles Consolidated Electric Railway Company (LACE). In addition, they acquired and electrified existing horsecar lines in Pasadena.

On April 11, 1894, Sherman and Clark incorporated the Pasadena & Los Angeles Electric Railway Company (P&LA), southern California’s first interurban line. This line connected the Pasadena lines with the LACE Railway system at Sycamore Grove.

=== The Pasadena and Pacific Electric Railroad Company ===
In November, 1894, they incorporated the Pasadena & Pacific Electric Railroad Company (P&P) of Arizona, to build a second interurban line from Los Angeles to Santa Monica.

But all the construction on the LACE, P&LA and P&P properties stretched Sherman and Clark’s financial situation, and LACE defaulted on a bond payment. In March, 1895, the LACE Railway bondholder group acquired the LACE lines and organized a new company, the Los Angeles Railway Company (LARy). Sherman and Clark negotiated with the group and managed to keep the P&LA and P&P lines.

The Pasadena and Los Angeles line opened on May 4, 1895.

Construction to Santa Monica via Colegrove of the narrow-gauge electric line began shortly thereafter, on June 11, 1895, with Clark serving as contractor, using the roadbed of the old Elysian Park Street Railway and the Los Angeles and Pacific Railway. They negotiated an agreement with LARy to use that company’s track to enter the downtown area. Car shops and a rail yard were built midway between Los Angeles and Santa Monica, in an area they named Sherman. Santa Monica promoters Robert S. Baker and Senator John P. Jones provided 225 acres near the Soldier’s Home, and Sherman and Clark sold it to raise funds for construction. The property became part of Sawtelle.

On April 1, 1896, after passing through fields of wildflowers and freshly plowed farms, the first car entered into Santa Monica, where its arrival was celebrated.

On November 9, 1896, Sherman and Clark incorporated the Pasadena and Pacific Railway Company of California, and built a line from Los Angeles, then known as the Sixteenth Street Division, via West 16th Street (Venice Boulevard), to Beverly. Shorter by two miles and faster to the beach than the line through Colegrove, it was called the “Santa Monica Short Line”, and opened July 1, 1897.

Again, financial difficulties arose. The P&LA defaulted on its bond payments in 1897 and the bondholders forced the company into receivership in January, 1898. The P&LA was sold by the court on April 27, 1898 and then reorganized as the Los Angeles-Pacific Electric Railway Company. Henry E. Huntington bought the LA&P and the local Pasadena lines in late 1898, leaving Sherman and Clark with their western lines and, as Henry Huntington noted, a nice profit.

=== The Los Angeles-Pacific Railroad Company ===
They then created another corporation on June 4, 1898, the Los Angeles-Pacific, and folded the existing lines into this corporation. They followed this practice of creating new corporations for new lines, and then combining the new line and old lines into another new corporation for years.

On December 15, 1899, Sherman and Clark started a line on Prospect Avenue in Hollywood, just north of the Colegrove line. Prospect Avenue, opened in 1887, would be renamed Hollywood Boulevard in 1910. Though much construction was financed though bonds, various people paid a bonus to the LAP to help with construction of various Colegrove and Hollywood lines, a common practice for Sherman and Clark.

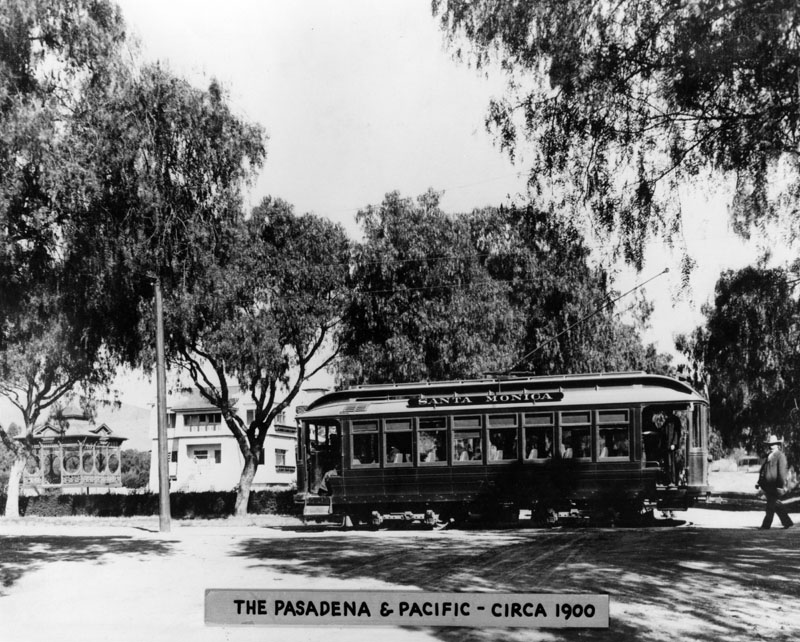
1900: Los Angeles-Pacific 70-Class car labelled "Santa Monica"

1902 was a very active year. A section of private right of way, the first section of what would be called the Trolleyway, was built between Santa Monica and Venice.

The Palms Division was built, encompassing a line from Vineyard through Ivy Station (the future Culver City) to Ocean Park. Called the Venice Short Line, this would become LAP’s most popular line. A new powerhouse in Ocean Park was built to handle the increased power requirements. The company purchased new cars to carry the additional traffic.

The Santa Monica Short Line (Venice Boulevard, San Vicente Boulevard, Santa Monica Boulevard) and the Venice Short Line (Venice Boulevard, Trolley Way, Ocean) took away much of the Southern Pacific and Atchison, Topeka and Santa Fe Railway's passenger business. After the Santa Fe received permission to abandon their line from Santa Monica to Inglewood, LAP acquired it. At the time, it was the only standard-gauged line that LAP owned.

By June, 1902, the company had 102.635 miles of equivalent single track.

In September, 1902, the Los Angeles, Hermosa Beach and Redondo Railway Company was formed to create a line down the coast. The Del Rey Division was built from Ivy to a new resort development named Playa Del Rey, whose many investors included Sherman and Clark. Opened on December 7, 1903, it was followed by a line from Playa Del Rey to Redondo Beach, which was inaugurated in late summer, 1904. The Redondo line passed by Hermosa Beach, where Sherman and Clark also had major investments.

With the Redondo and Del Rey Divisions well underway, the Los Angeles, Hermosa Beach and Redondo Railway Company was merged into a new company, the Los Angeles Pacific Railroad Company of California on June 16, 1903, along with another line, the Los Angeles-Santa Monica Railroad Company, and the original LA-P.

During 1902 and 1903 there was a competitive threat to Sherman and Clark's plans. William Hook, principal behind the Los Angeles Traction Company (LAT), and developer Abbot Kinney were building a line to Venice as well. After much wrangling between the two groups, the Southern Pacific purchased the stock of LAT, who then abandoned the proposed line, freeing Sherman and Clark to proceed with their plans.

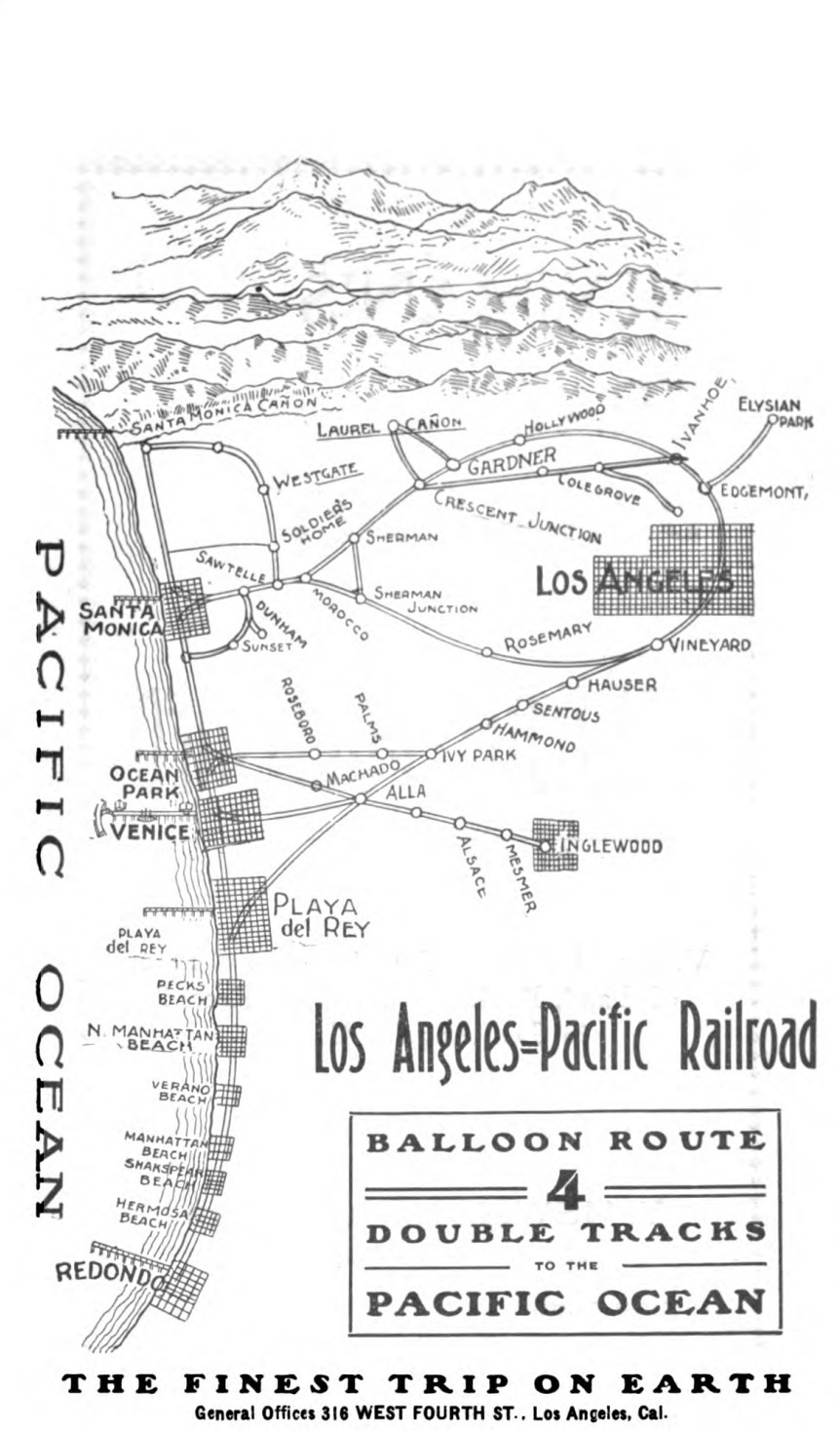
”Balloon” shape of the LAPRR’s Balloon Route visible on map from 1903 guidebook

In 1903, a new, larger power house was built at Vineyard which replaced both the damaged Sherman power equipment and the Ocean Park power house.

In 1905, the Lagoon line, the line from Santa Monica to Venice, was extended from Venice to Playa Del Rey. When Robert C. Gillis' new Brentwood Park subdivision (in which Sherman and Clark were investors) was being built in 1906, LAP built tracks for the Westgate Line, which ran on San Vicente Boulevard to Ocean Avenue (Santa Monica) and then turned south to the Santa Monica Main Line.

In February, 1906, there were persistent rumors that E. H. Harriman, of the Southern Pacific Railroad, had purchased the Los Angeles Pacific, but Clark denied them. Finally, in March, 1906 it was revealed that Harriman had purchased control of the Los Angeles Pacific. Sherman had asked Harriman to guarantee LAP bonds, and Harriman agreed, on condition that he receive a controlling interest. Sherman and Clark continued to manage the company.

=== The Los Angeles Pacific Company ===
The Southern Pacific incorporated a new company on April 4, 1907, the Los Angeles Pacific Company, capitalized at $20,000,000 (210,000 shares at $100 each). 107,100 shares were held by Epes Randolph on behalf of Harriman.

From 1907 through 1909, all the company’s lines, which had almost all been narrow-gauge, were rebuilt to standard-gauge.

Plans for a subway from Fourth Street to Vineyard, along with a large terminal building were announced, along with addition a third and fourth track to the Venice Short Line, and tunnels north of the Hill Street station that would benefit the Hollywood line, but a business panic in 1907 and other projects interfered with these plans. The Pacific Electric Railway would later build a different version of the subway and the Subway Terminal Building in the mid-twenties.

In 1908 LAP leased the Southern Pacific Santa Monica Line (the Air Line) and the Long Wharf, and electrified it from Santa Monica to Sentous, which would become the interchange point with the SP for freight.

In 1909, the company did build two tunnels north of the Hill Street Station, designed to make entry to Los Angeles easier for the Hollywood and Colegrove cars. These opened on Tunnel Day, September 9, 1909, and cut 10 minutes off the time to Hollywood and Colegrove. In addition, they started preliminary engineering work on a line to the San Fernando Valley via Cahuenga Pass, a project that would ultimately be completed by the Pacific Electric Railway, which opened the line in 1912.

By October, 1909, the Los Angeles Pacific had grown to 213.5 miles of track, all standard gauged.

=== 1911: LAP becomes part of the new Pacific Electric ===
Sherman and Clark remained minority stockholders, executive officers and directors of the company until May 28, 1910 when they sold their shares to the Southern Pacific and retired from active participation in the company. SP then pressured Huntington to sell his shares in the Pacific Electric Railway.

On September 1, 1911, in what is called “The Great Merger”, the Southern Pacific consolidated seven electric railways into the new “Pacific Electric Railway Company”. The Los Angeles Pacific lines, along with the Glendale–Burbank Line and the soon-to-be-completed San Fernando Valley Line, would become the Pacific Electric’s Western Division.

In September, 1911, the Los Angeles Pacific brought to the new Pacific Electric Railway the following:

- 204.67 miles (329.38 km) of owned track
- 26.20 miles (42.16 km) of leased track
- 172 passenger cars
- 194 freight cars
- 25 line and other service cars
- $21 million in outstanding stock and $14,201,000 in bonds. ($709 million and $479 million respectively in 2024 adjusted for inflation)

== Lines ==
LAP passenger cars operated local service in the cities of Los Angeles, Pasadena, Hollywood, Sawtelle, Santa Monica, and Ocean Park.

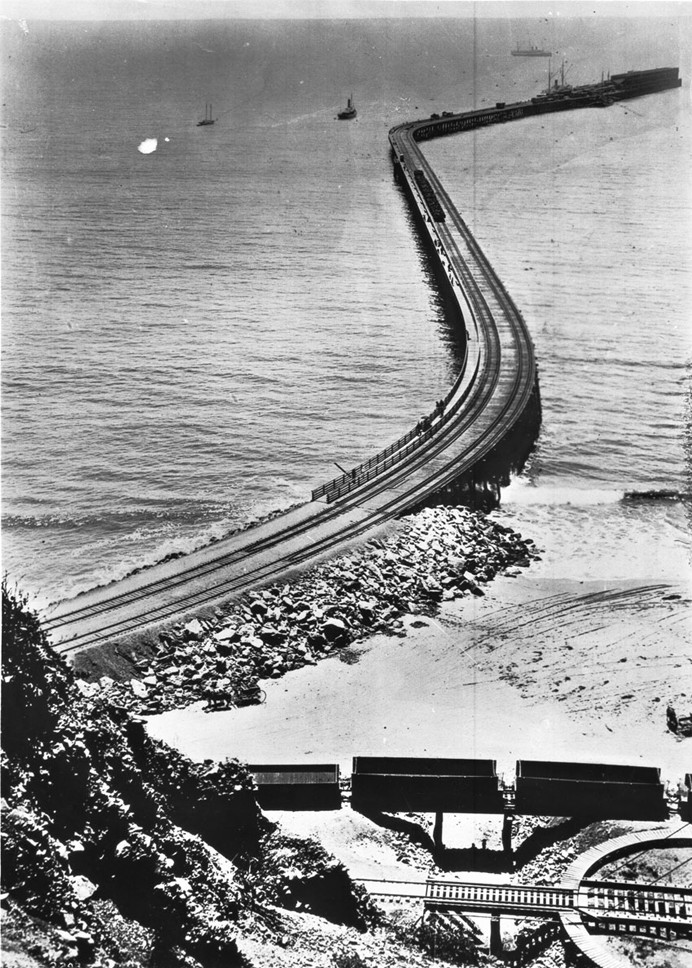
Long Wharf in Santa Monica Bay 1895

LAP’s best performing interurban lines included these four:

- Santa Monica Short Line – Hill Street to Santa Monica, Ocean Park and Venice by way of Vineyard and Beverly
- Venice Short Line – Hill Street to Venice, Ocean Park and Venice by way of Vineyard and Ivy
- Hollywood Line – Hill Street to Gardner Junction in Hollywood by way of Sunset, Prospect Ave (Hollywood Boulevard) and private right of way.
- Redondo Beach via Playa del Rey Line – Hill Street to Manhattan Beach, Hermosa Beach and Redondo Beach by way of Vineyard and Del Rey.

Other important interurban lines included these:

- Colegrove Line – Hill Street to Santa Monica, Ocean Park and Venice by way of Colegrove (South Hollywood)and Sherman.
- Western and Franklin Avenue Line – From Hill Street to Hollywood and Vine by way of Sunset, Santa Monica Boulevard, Western Ave, Franklin Ave, Argyle Ave, Yucca St, and Vine Street.
- Westgate Line (Brentwood) – Hill Street to Santa Monica (North Beach) by way of Vineyard, Sherman, Beverly, Sawtelle, Soldier’s Home and 26th Street.

Local service was primarily provided on these lines:

- Lagoon Line – Seventh and Montana in Santa Monica to Playa Del Rey. Was exceptionally popular on beach days. Part of the route used private right of way called the Trolleyway.
- Brush Canyon Line – From Franklin Avenue north on Brush Canyon to a quarry.
- Highland Line – From Santa Monica Boulevard north on Highland to Cahuenga Pass. Was in the process of being extended to San Fernando Valley when LAP was consolidated with other railways to form the Pacific Electric.
- Elysian Park Line – From Sunset north on Echo Park Avenue to Cerro Gordo.
- Rodeo Line – From Santa Monica Boulevard north on Rodeo Drive to the future Beverly Hills Hotel (built 1912) on Sunset Boulevard.
- South Loop, North Loop – local lines in Santa Monica.
- Santa Monica Air Line –From Fourth Street station to Vineyard and Ivy to Santa Monica. Only one car daily but regular service was offered between Ivy, Santa Monica and Port Los Angeles.
- Inglewood Line – From Fifth and Santa Monica to Santa Monica Depot in Inglewood. Used mostly for freight but a single, daily passenger car was used to preserve the franchise.
- Santa Monica Canyon Line – From Colorado in Santa Monica to Port Los Angeles.
- Laurel Canyon Line – From Hill Street via the Hollywood Line to Laurel Canyon Boulevard. In 1910, an interesting feature was an electric “Trackless Trolley” at its terminus which served “Bungalowtown” at the head of the canyon.
- Soldier’s Home – From Sawtelle Station on Santa Monica Boulevard, north on Sepulveda Boulevard to the Soldier’s Home, where it made a loop,
- Motordrome Spur – a spur off the Redondo Line, near Playa Del Rey, that served an auto Motordrome from 1910 to 1913. The racetrack featured drives such as Barney Oldfield.

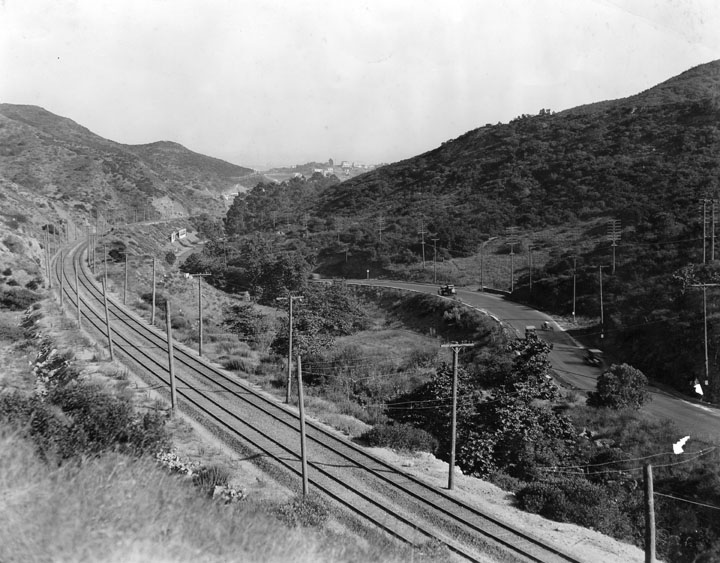
A 1922 view of Cahuenga Pass and the rail lines laid by the Los Angeles Pacific and Pacific Electric Railways

=== Balloon Route ===
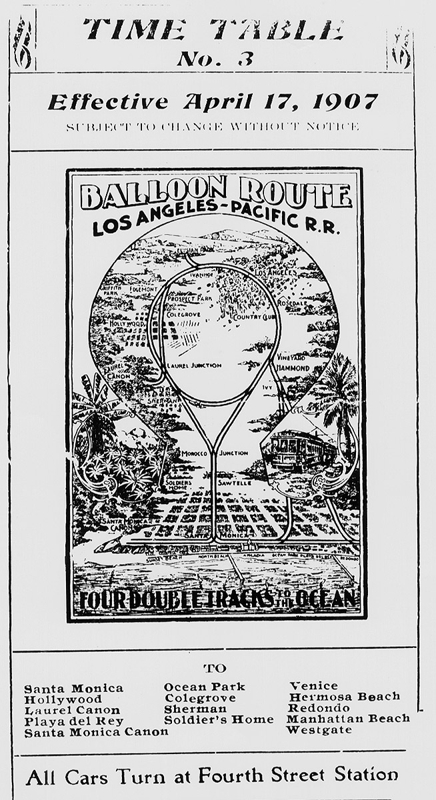
Balloon route Map 1907

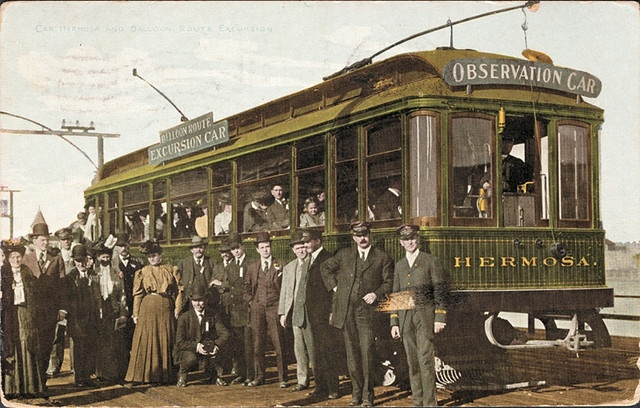
Los Angeles Pacific - Balloon Route car, 1905

The Balloon Route Trolley trip was a featured excursion of the Los Angeles Pacific, and opened in 1901. Beginning in November, 1904, Charles Merritt Pierce, the original owner of the Glen-Holly Hotel, Hollywood's first hotel, operated the line for the LAP.

Initially, the line ran from the Hill Street station in downtown Los Angeles, via the Santa Monica Short Line through Hollywood to Santa Monica and Ocean Park, and then back to Los Angeles via Palms and the Venice Short Line.

As the system expanded, the excursion expanded as well. Excursion cars (sometimes in multi-unit trains) made the following stops in 1909:

- From the Hill Street station, through the Hill Street tunnels to the Sunset Boulevard studio of painter Paul de Longpré
- Through farms to the bean fields of Morocco (the future Beverly Hills)
- A stop at the Old Soldiers' Home above Sawtelle for pictures
- A trip onto the Long Wharf north of Santa Monica
- A stop at the Camera Obscura in Santa Monica
- A stop at the Playa del Rey Pavilion for a fish dinner
- A ride along the beach to Redondo's Moonstone Beach
- A return trip up the beaches to Venice
- A final return downtown via Palms on the Venice Short Line

This excursion line was heavily advertised and thus became well known. Brochures and ads touted it as “101 miles for $1.00”, or "10-dollar tour for one dollar”. The first car used was a Parlor car (#400), and as the line became popular more cars were added, until the larger 700 class cars made trains possible. Excursions departed downtown Los Angeles at 9:30 am each day and returned to Los Angeles at 5:00 pm.

In 1906, when Harriman/Southern Pacific interests took over ownership and operation of LAP, they continued the excursions with Pierce in charge. When the LAP was consolidated into the new Pacific Electric Railway Company (PE) in 1911, PE took over the operations and continued the excursion until 1923.

The Balloon Route Streetcar Depot, West Los Angeles has been on the National Register of Historic Places since 1972.

== Cars ==
In 1906 the company owned and operated 405 cars: 144 passenger cars, 6 parlor cars, 17 electric locomotives, 221 freight cars, 5 mail cars and 12 repair service cars.

The company had several types of cars. This is what LAP had as of April, 1911.

Passenger cars included motorized cars that conveyed passengers from place to place, or non-motorized trailers that were pulled by the motorized cars. Passenger cars changed over time, reflecting the continual upgrading of the system from a simple country trolley line to a heavy-duty interurban railroad. LAP purchased groups of cars and assigned series numbers; for example, they acquired the 60-series in 1895-96 and numbered them 60-69.

The original cars, purchased in 1895-96 from Pullman and Brill, included the motorized 60- and 70-series, and the non-motorized trailer 40-series. These cars had two 43 h.p. motors and could carry up to 48 passengers. They also had the distinctive 5-window ends that would become the standard for LA streetcars.

After 1902, when LAP had built more lines, larger and more powerful cars were purchased including the 180- and 190-series from the American Car Company, along with the 48-series trailers. Most cars had open sections on either or both ends, and were called California cars. In 1904-05, LAP purchased 50 new 48-passenger cars from the St. Louis Car Company, that they numbered the 200-series. But even with two 57 h.p. motors, these cars were still not powerful enough for heavy interurban use.

Once SP interests purchased a majority interest, the resulting influx of money let LAP purchase 50 heavy-duty cars from the St. Louis Car Company, which were numbered the 700-series. These cars were substantially larger, with a 56-passenger capacity, and had four 75 h.p. motors rather than the two that most previous cars used. These cars were immediately put to use on the Venice Short Line and Santa Monica Short Line.

Some were plusher than regular cars; these included Observation cars used for the Balloon Route excursion (especially car 400), the beautiful “El Viento” for LAP’s officers’ use, and the “Mermaid”, Sherman’s private car.

Some cars were built or modified at the Sherman Shops. New passenger cars had new bracing installed to make them stronger, or had different brakes or motors installed. Old passenger cars may be converted to Line or Maintenance cars. The shops even built electric locomotives from older cars.

Freight and Express cars – LAP had a large number of freight cars to handle commodities and freight, including over 60 flat cars, 13 box cars, over 100 dump cars, and 15 oil cars. The company also had 15 cars that handled express freight and the mail.

Line cars had a variety of uses, including tower cars for maintaining the overhead, a bonding car to connect rails electrically, a wrecker to deal with car wrecks, a portable substation to provide power anywhere when needed, work motors to move cars and construction crews, a vacuum car that quickly cleaned passenger cars, a weed burner, a sprinkler, a gondola for rubbish.

== Facilities ==
=== Stations ===
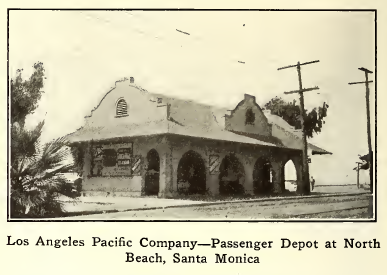
LAP Santa Monica Station 1909

- Fourth Street Station – The first passenger station in downtown Los Angeles was at 222 West Fourth Street, and was shared with the Pasadena and Los Angeles Electric Railway. There was no rail yard, and passengers embarked or disembarked on cars in the street.

In 1900 the Los Angeles Pacific Railroad waiting room and offices moved to a larger, $100,000 building at 314 West 4th Street next to the Broadway Department Store in Downtown Los Angeles. Passengers again had to load and alight in the street.

- Hill Street Station – Once the system began to be standard-gauged after the Harriman acquisition, a new station and yard was built in April, 1908, at 439 South Hill Street, between Fourth and Fifth Streets. Cars arriving on the West 16th Street line used this station, while narrow-gauge cars from Hollywood and Colegrove used the Fourth Street station.

A fire on in November 15, 1908 destroyed the Fourth Street offices, forcing the company to move their offices to the Masonic Temple on Hill Street, which was next to the Hill Street station, and had been purchased by LAP in anticipation of the Fourth Street subway project. The neighboring rail yard was reconfigured to handle both the East 16th Street and Hollywood traffic.

- Brick stations were located at individual destinations such as Santa Monica, Hollywood, Ocean Park, Beverly, Playa Del Rey, Hermosa Beach, Sawtelle and Sherman. Frame stations could be found at Port of Los Angeles, Santa Monica, Palms, Soldier’s Home, Ocean Park, Venice and Redondo.

=== Maintenance facilities ===
In 1896, the Pasadena and Pacific Railway Company purchased 5.56-acres (2.25 ha) on Santa Monica Boulevard about halfway between Los Angeles and Santa Monica and constructed a rail facility. “Sherman”, as it was called (after Moses Sherman), had a steam power house, a car barn, repair shops, and over two miles of rails for car storage. The nearby settlement was also named "Sherman", and eventually became the city of West Hollywood.

In October 1906, the Harriman interests acquired another 13.81 acres after filling in nearby swampy areas and added additional shop buildings in mid-1907. In 1912 the Pacific Electric Railway moved all repair services to their Seventh Avenue & Central shops in downtown Los Angeles, but the Sherman facility remained open for local maintenance.

Other rail yards were at the Buena Vista freight depot and the Hill Street Station.

=== Electrical power ===
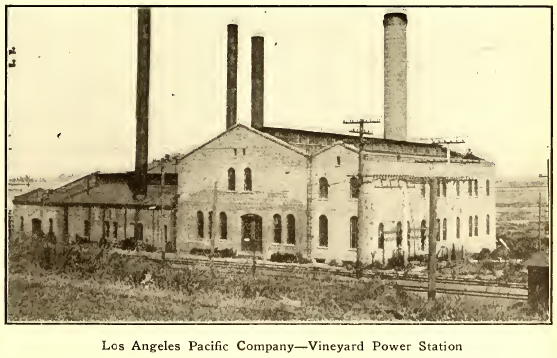
LAP Vineyard Power Station 1909

- Electrical power for the original lines was provided by a steam-powered facility at Sherman. After an explosion crippled the plant, and because of the power needs of the new Venice Short Line, a second power house was built in December, 1901 at Ocean Park. In the meantime, power for the LAP was supplied by the Los Angeles Railway.
- As the system expanded further, LAP built a much larger power house in September, 1903 at the intersection of the Palms Division (Venice Short Line) and the Santa Monica Short Line, at a location called Vineyard. Vineyard became the company's central power station, using a Westinghouse Parsons steam turbine to generate 2400 AC volts. Vineyard was expanded to accommodate even more expansion in March, 1904, early 1905, and May, 1906 so that by the time heavy-duty multiple unit cars were used, the power generation was ample.
- Substations converted the 2400 volts AC to the 600 volts DC used by streetcar motors, and were located at Bush Street and Burlington Avenue, West Olive Street, Ivy Park (Culver City), Playa del Rey, Hermosa, Ocean Park, and Sherman.

=== Other facilities ===
- Hill Street Tunnels – in 1908 and 1909, two tunnels were dug north of the Hill Street Station so that cars coming from Hollywood had faster access to the station. The tunnels opened on Tunnel Day, September 15, 1909, and cut 10 minutes off the travel time from the Hollywood area.
- Long Wharf – the Long Wharf was constructed by Southern Pacific in 1893 to serve as a proposed harbor that would take the place of SP facilities in San Pedro. After San Pedro was selected as Los Angeles’ main harbor, this facility declined in importance, and in 1908 LAP leased this facility and related trackage and used it to receive lumber until 1911. In 1908 LAP also included it as part of the Balloon Route excursion.

== Freight and mail handling ==
Freight operations were important to LAP. As early as 1898, they used electrified steam cars (obtained from two steam railways they acquired earlier) to transport boxcars of lemons from the groves in Colegrove and Hollywood to either Los Angeles for local consumption, or to Ocean Park, where it was transferred to Santa Fe boxcars (due to the difference in rail gauges) for shipment to eastern cities. Early freight shipments also included decomposed granite from the Laurel Canyon area, which was transported throughout the system where it was used as ballast. Oil for power house use was transported via steam via the Oil Spur line, constructed in 1900. In addition, during that same year LAP was granted the contract to deliver mail to Santa Monica.

As the system expanded, freight assumed a larger role as well. By 1901 there were 11 freight stations spread across the system which could receive and distribute freight shipments. LAP built 5 electric locomotives in their Sherman Shops to help accommodate the traffic.

By 1902, LAP acquired the Santa Fe’s Inglewood branch, and used steam equipment over the line until it was electrified in October. LAP could now collect freight from all over its growing system, transfer it to box cars in Ocean Park and move it to Inglewood for transfer to the Santa Fe. In order to facilitate this, a larger freight depot was constructed at Ocean Park. This allowed LAP to deliver all the lumber for the Ocean Park Lumber Company.

By 1903, as LAP generated more power, it was able to increase its freight services. There were now three freight trains a day: one 5 AM train to Santa Monica (delivering newspapers, fruit and vegetables), a through freight at 7 AM, and a way freight at 1 PM.

LAP constructed a spur off of 26th Street in Santa Monica for a local brickyard. This new track helped LAP increase its freight business, and also allowed shipments to be transferred to Southern Pacific boxcars for further delivery.

As freight handling continued to grow, in April, 1905 the Buena Vista Freight House was built at Sunset and North Broadway, serviced by ten tracks. This freight house handled freight, express shipments, and passengers. In May, 1905, six new express motors were added to handle the business.

Once the Harriman/SP interests acquired a controlling interest in 1906, and the system and cars were broad-gauged, LAP was able to expand freight services even more. In 1908, they leased SP’s Air Line, which brought new business. Sentous now became the chief interchange point for freight, now between LAP and SP.

The many lines radiating from Los Angeles made LAP vital to west side communities. Starting in 1907, a newspaper train delivered Los Angeles papers to Redondo Beach via Hollywood and Colegrove. Express and mail trains made deliveries to various parts of the system each day. Local deliveries within communities were made via wagons.

By 1909 the system had 17 electric locomotives, 225 freight cars, and 5 mail or express cars. There was a freight terminal in every town of any size. Along with regular freight, LAP transported bulk commodities that included crushed stone, oil, lumber, citrus and more, usually shipped from late at night until dawn, when more power was available.

By 1911, daily shipments had increased to two from Los Angeles to Redondo, four from LA to Venice via Colegrove and two from LA to Hollywood. After the September, 1911 Great Merger, LAP trackage was connected to Pacific Electric via the Air Line, the Buena Vista freight house was closed, and all freight was diverted to PE’s Freight House at Eighth and Hemlock.

== Legacy ==
Luther Ingersoll has credited the tremendous growth of the beach communities and other settlements along the trolley lines to the creation of these trolley lines, as they brought new settlers who purchased lots in the many developments, and brought pleasure seekers to the various beaches. It was Sherman and Clark’s electric lines and real estate ventures which worked together to bring this about.

== Remaining LAP facilities and routes ==
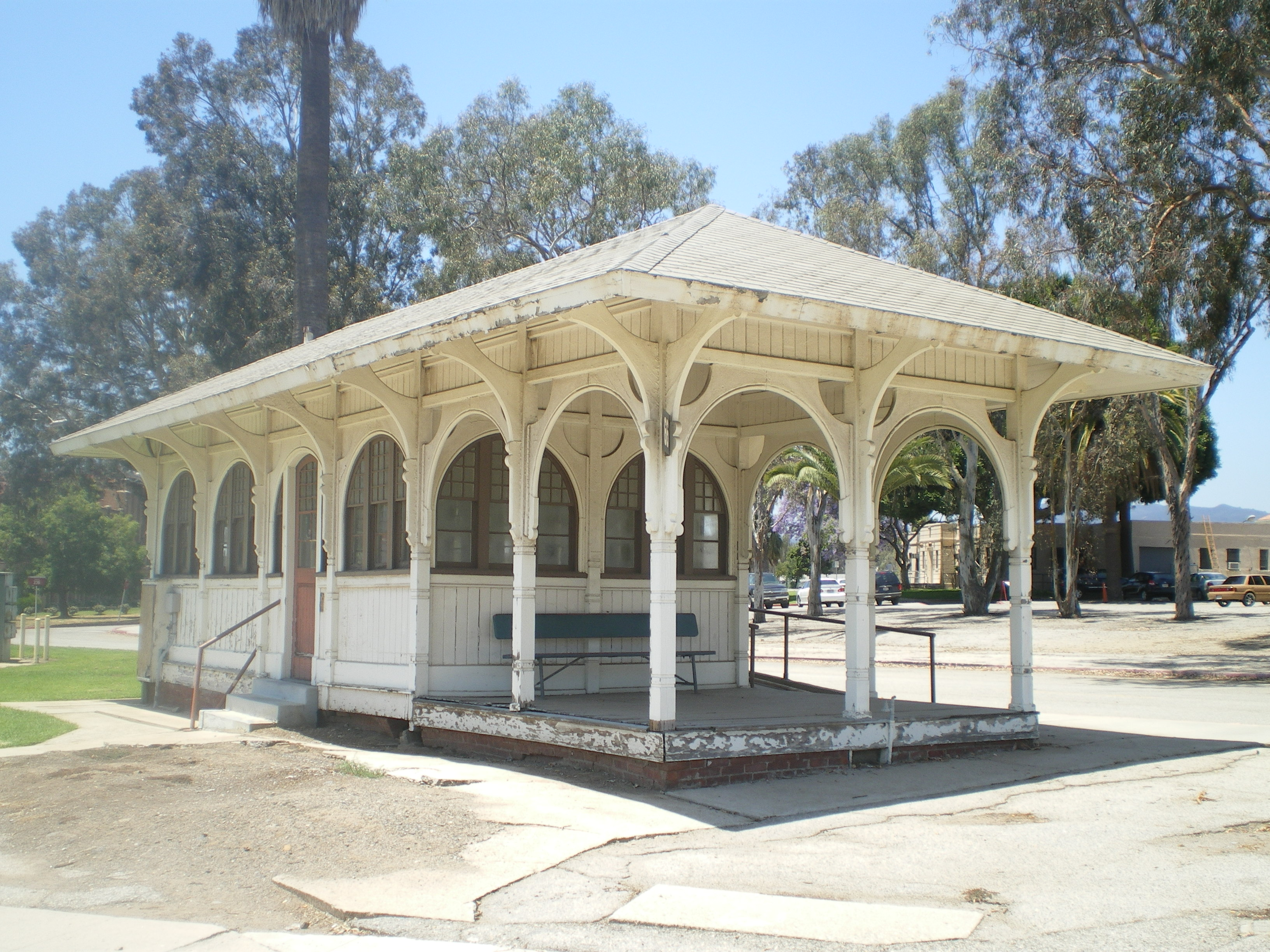
1900 Streetcar Depot at the Sawtelle Veterans Home, a stop of the Balloon Route, now listed on the U.S. National Register of Historic Places

The current Sherman Way G Line station is on the right-of-way of a line planned by LAP, and completed by Pacific Electric. Sherman Way is named after General Sherman, due his land development and rail lines he built in the valley.

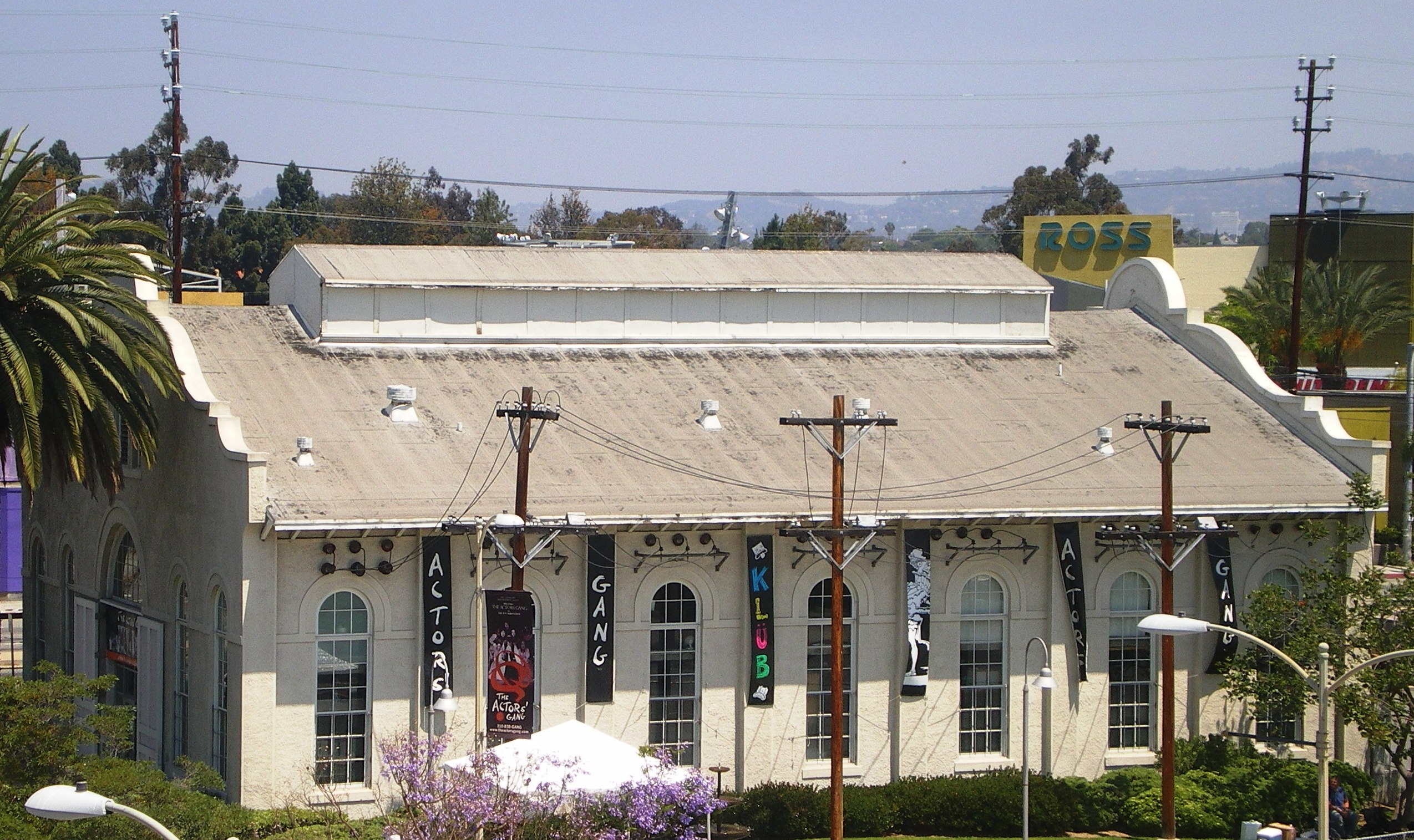
LAP Ivy Substation

- Ivy Substation - 9070 Venice Boulevard, Culver City, CA
- Burlington Substation - 1147 West Venice Boulevard, Los Angeles, CA - now an auto upholstery shop
- West Olive Substation, built in 1905, now Epitaph Records, 2798 W. Sunset Boulevard, Los Angeles,
- Site of Ocean Park Carhouse - now Metro Division 6, 100 Sunset Ave, Venice
- Site of Sherman Shops – now West Hollywood, Metro Division 7 and Pacific Design Center
- Air Line – now Metro E-Line/Expo Line
- Palms-Southern Pacific Railroad Depot - Heritage Square, 3800 N. Homer St, Montecito Heights, CA

== See also ==
- Sunset Junction, Los Angeles
- Streetcar suburb
- List of California street railroads
- Streetcars in North America
- List of California railroads
- History of rail transportation in California
- Los Angeles Motordrome
- Pacific Electric's Red Cars
- Los Angeles and Independence Railroad

== Bibliography ==
- Albright, P. H. (November 30, 1909). "Reconstruction and Improvements of the Los Angeles Pacific Company". Electric Railway Journal. New York, NY: McGraw Publishing Company.
- Coscia, David (2011). Pacific Electric and the Growth of the San Fernando Valley. Bellflower, CA: Shade Tree Books. ISBN 978-1-57864-735-4.
- Crump, Spencer (1977). Ride the Big Red Cars: How Trolleys Helped Build Southern California. Corona Del Mar, CA: Trans-Anglo Books. ISBN 978-0-87046-047-0.
- Duke, Donald. (2004). Pacific Electric Railway, Volume 4: The Western Division. San Marino, CA.: Golden West Books. ISBN 978-0-87095-117-6.
- Fogelson, Robert (1967). The Fragmented Metropolis Los Angeles: 1850-1930. Cambridge, Massachusetts: Harvard University Press.
- Friedricks, William B. (1992). Henry Huntington and the Creation of Southern California. Columbus, OH.: Ohio University Press. ISBN 978-0-8142-0553-2.
- Gierach, Ryan (2003). West Hollywood. Charleston, SC: Arcadia Publishing.
- Hendricks, William O. (1971). M.H. Sherman: A Pioneer Developer of the Pacific Southwest. Corona del Mar, CA: The Sherman Foundation.
- Hilton, George W. & Due, John (1960). The Electric Interurban Railway in America. Stanford, CA: Stanford University Press.
- Ingersoll, Luther A. (1908). Ingersoll's Century History, Santa Monica Bay Cities. Los Angeles, CA: Luther A. Ingersoll. ISBN 978-1408623671.
- Loomis, Jan (2012). Westside Chronicles: Historic Stories of West Los Angeles. Charlestown, SC: The History Press. ISBN 978-1609496234.
- Myers, William A. & Swett, Ira (1976). Trolleys to the Surf: The Story of the Los Angeles Pacific Railway, Interurbans Special #63. Glendale, CA: Interurbans Publications. ISBN 978-0-916374-22-8. OCLC 2507484.
- Pacific Electric (1914). Pacific Electric Corporate History 1885-1911 (1998 reprint). Perris, CA: Orange Empire Railway Museum.
- Palmer, Edwin O. (1938). History of Hollywood. New York, NY: Garland Publishing (1978 reprint).
- Post, Robert C. (1989). Street Railways and the Growth of Los Angeles. San Marino, CA: Golden West Books. ISBN 0-87095-104-1.
- Scott, Paula (2004). Santa Monica: A City on the Edge. Charlestown, SC: Arcadia Publishing. ISBN 0-7385-2469-7.
- —— (1982). Trolley Days in Pasadena. San Marino, CA: Golden West Books. ISBN 978-0-87095-086-5.
- Smedley, Paul A. (2018). Huntington Tracks. San Marino, CA: Golden West Books. ISBN 978-0-87095-129-9.
- Swett, Ira & Walker, Jim (1975). Lines of the Pacific Electric Southern and Western Districts, Interurbans Special #60. Glendale, CA: Interurbans Publications. ISBN 0-916374-02-5. OCLC 2119913.
- Swett, Ira (1956). Los Angeles Pacific, Interurbans Special #18. Los Angeles, CA: Interurbans.
- —— (1965). Los Angeles Pacific Album, Interurbans Special #40. Los Angeles, CA: Interurbans.
- Thorpe, James (1994). Henry Edwards Huntington: A Biography. Berkeley, CA: University of California Press.
