= Regency Plaza Suites =

Hotel in Los Angeles (1958–2007)

Coordinates: 34.101°N 118.363°W

- Interactive map of the Regency Plaza Suites area

General information
- Type: Hotel
- Location: Hollywood Boulevard, 7940, Los Angeles, California

The Regency Plaza Suites, also known as the Regency Hotel, the Regency Plaza, and the Plaza Suites Hotel, was an establishment located at 7940 Hollywood Boulevard in Los Angeles, California. It was built in 1958 and consisted of two wooden two-story buildings, a smaller "Garden" building (14 units) with a street address of 7926 Hollywood Blvd., and the larger "Main House" (45 units) which included the lobby and the hotel pool. A long-term residence hotel, it was eventually converted into an apartment complex before being demolished in 2007. The site is now a three-story apartment building called The HW.

The Regency Hotel is infamous for being the building where actor Divine (Harris Glenn Milstead) died of an enlarged heart - due to his obese frame he had an additional sleep apnea, so that his physician told him to not sleep on his back, which he then ignored and thus died in his sleep from cardiac arrest through sleep apnea - March 7, 1988 while staying in second-story front-room number 261.
