= Glen-Holly Hotel =

Hotel in Southern California

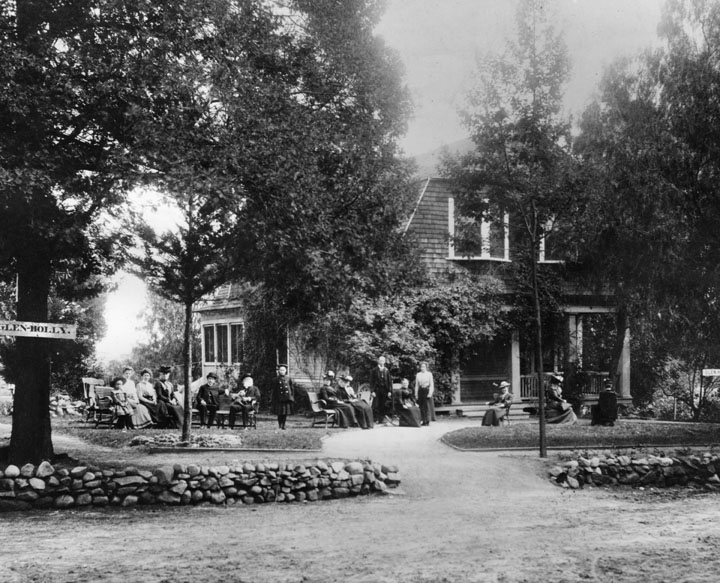
- Glen-Holly Hotel, 1890s
- Interactive map of the Glen-Holly Hotel area

General information
- Status: Demolished
- Location: Ivar Avenue at Yucca Street, Hollywood, California
- Coordinates: 34°6′13.99″N 118°19′41.34″W
- Construction started: 1887
- Opened: 1895

Design and construction
- Architect: Joakim Berg

Other information
- Number of rooms: 20

The Glen-Holly Hotel was a hotel built in 1895 in the area of southern California that would later become Hollywood. It was located just north of Prospect Avenue, now Hollywood Boulevard, on Ivar Avenue at Yucca Street.

The Glen-Holly Hotel was the second hotel constructed in the Hollywood district of Los Angeles County (Sackett Hotel was the first). It was built by Joakim Berg, a noted artist of the 1890s in the region. At the hotel's opening, it had twenty rooms and one bath. A horse carriage called a tallyho took guests from downtown Los Angeles to the hotel.

The hotel's original owner, Charles M. Pierce, became operator of the Los Angeles Pacific Railroad's Balloon Route in 1904. The hotel, a stop on the line that went from downtown Los Angeles to West Los Angeles and the west side beaches, was used by the route as lunch stop.

D. L. Allen later took over management of the Glen-Holly Hotel, and added a billiard hall, bowling alley, and livery service.

The hotel, a landmark of the area, was later demolished.
