= Hot Springs Street Railroad =

Streetcars in Hot Springs, Arkansas

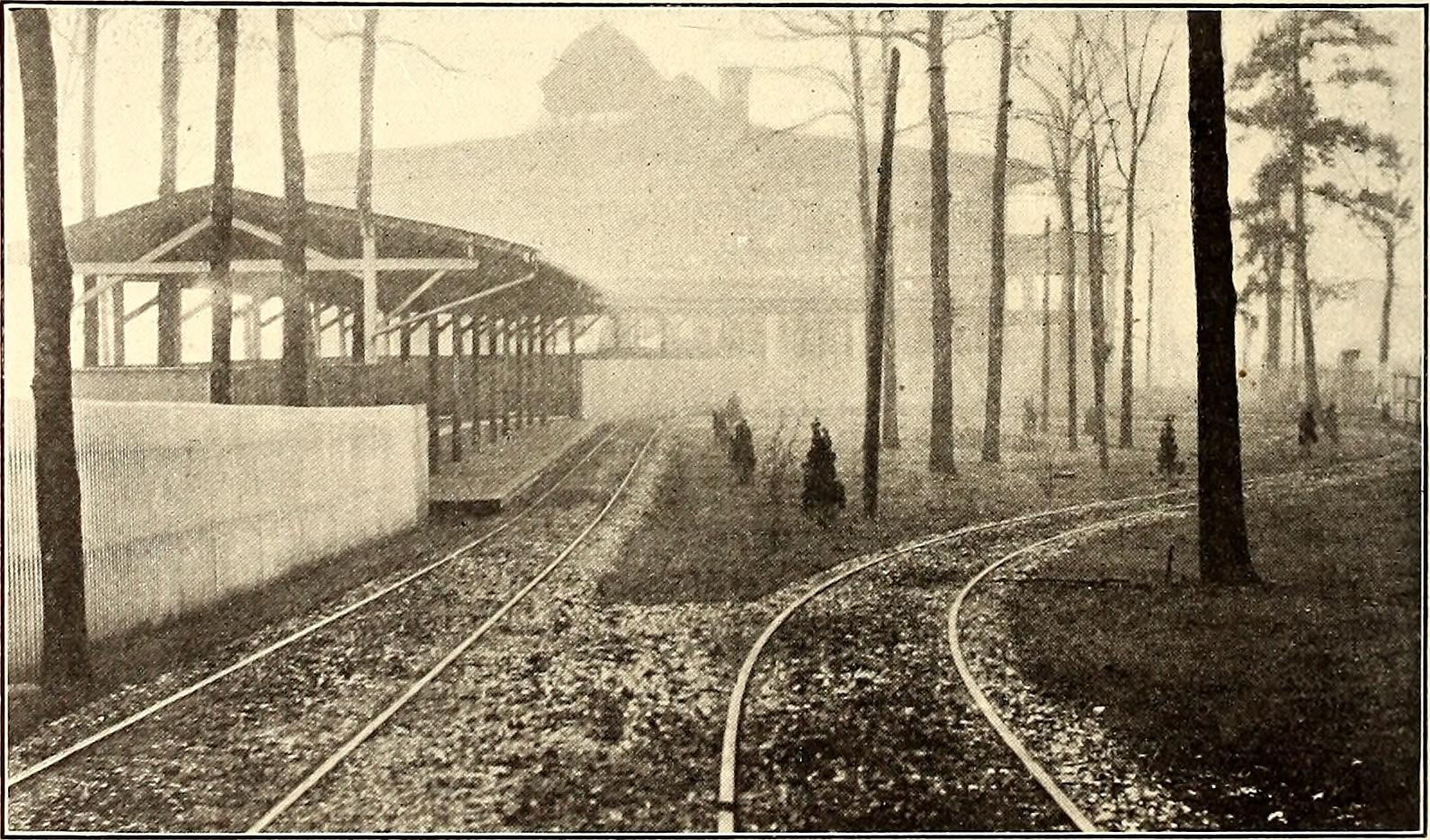

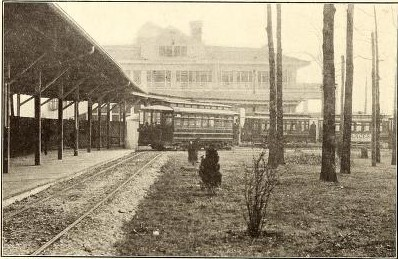
- Loading platform and streetcars ready for the race track crowd

Overview
- Headquarters: Hot Springs
- Locale: Arkansas

Technical
- Track gauge: 1,435 mm (4 ft 8 1/2 in) standard gauge

The Hot Springs Street Railroad ran from Hot Springs to the race track. The future extension of the street railroad to the race track was reported in the Forrest City Times in January 1894. The same company that owned this street railway, also owned the other Hot Springs public utilities companies for water, gas and electricity.

== Handling traffic ==
The limited number of streetcars owned by the Hot Springs Street Railroad, together with the fact that all those people attending the races wanted to go to the grounds and return to the city at practically the same time, necessitated the adoption of some unusual methods in handling passengers.

At the race track was a loading yard, which was 800 feet (240 m) long by about 125 feet (38 m) wide, enclosed in a picket fence 8 feet (2.4 m) high. At one end was a loading shed 180 feet (55 m) long and 35 feet (11 m)wide, and from which several gates gave entrance to the grounds. The loading yards contained storage tracks for twenty-five cars. All the cars going to the races were put in special service and no fares are collected on them. Instead, the fares were collected as the passengers went through the gates leading into the grounds.

At the end of the races about twenty-five cars are waiting in the loading yard and fares are collected as passengers passed through the gates. Four cars were drawn up to the loading platform at a time and were started out at close intervals. The method had the great advantage of securing all fares without trouble.
