= Brownsburg station =

Brownsburg
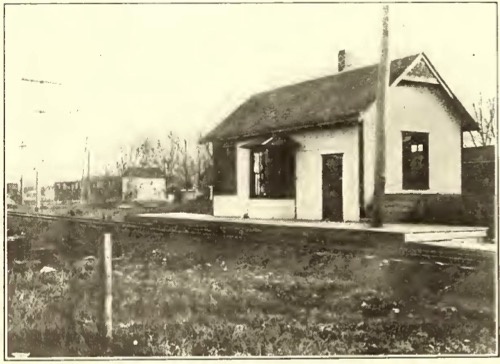
- Brownsburg interurban station, 1908

General information
- Location: Brownsburg, Indiana
- Coordinates: 39.8459°N 86.3968°W
- Owner: Terre Haute, Indianapolis and Eastern Traction Company
- Line: Ben Hur Route

History
- Opened: July 7, 1907
- Closed: October 31, 1930

Services
Preceding station	Terre Haute, Indianapolis and Eastern Traction Company	Following station
Carver toward Crawfordsville	Ben Hur Route	Brownsburg Street toward Indianapolis
Location

Brownsburg station is a former interurban railway station in Brownsburg, Indiana. It is located at 205 Green Street.

The station was built for service on the Indianapolis, Crawfordsville & Western Traction Company line, otherwise known as the Ben Hur Route. Built around 1908, the structure was typical of construction for stations along the line, having a passenger waiting room in one end and a freight room in the other end, with an office between the two rooms. The freight room floor was built at the same height as the floors of the express cars to facilitate loading and unloading. A platform was constructed behind and along one side of the building so that freight for immediate shipment can be loaded on the cars direct without passing through the freight room. A ticket agent was also stationed here.

Service along the line ended after October 31, 1930.
