= Martinsville station (Terre Haute, Indianapolis and Eastern Traction Company) =

Railway station in the United States

Martinsville

General information
- Location: 154 North Main Street; Martinsville, Indiana
- Coordinates: 39.4284°N 86.4288°W

History
- Opened: April 21, 1903
- Closed: October 31, 1930

Services
Preceding station	Terre Haute, Indianapolis and Eastern Traction Company	Following station
Terminus	Martinsville Line	Riverside toward Indianapolis
- Interurban Station
- U.S. Historic district – Contributing property
- Part of: Martinsville Commercial Historic District (ID98000300)
- Designated CP: April 1, 1998
Location

Martinsville station is a former interurban railway station in Martinsville, Indiana. Located at 154 North Main Street, it was the western terminus of the Martinsville line. The older, southern part of the station building was constructed in 1902 by the Indianapolis and Martinsville Rapid Transit Company and was the original waiting room and station for the interurban. Service began on April 21, 1903. A car barn was built adjacent to the building in 1911. Interurban trips ceased on October 31, 1930 as part of the process of Indiana Railroad taking over the Terre Haute, Indianapolis and Eastern Traction Company.

The northern segment of the building was constructed around 1956 on top of the former balloon loop. A flooring and siding store moved in to the building after December 1978. The station was deemed a contributing property of the Martinsville Commercial Historic District when it was listed on the National Register of Historic Places in 1998.
