= Terminal Arcade =

Former railway station in Terre Haute, Indiana

- U.S. National Register of Historic Places
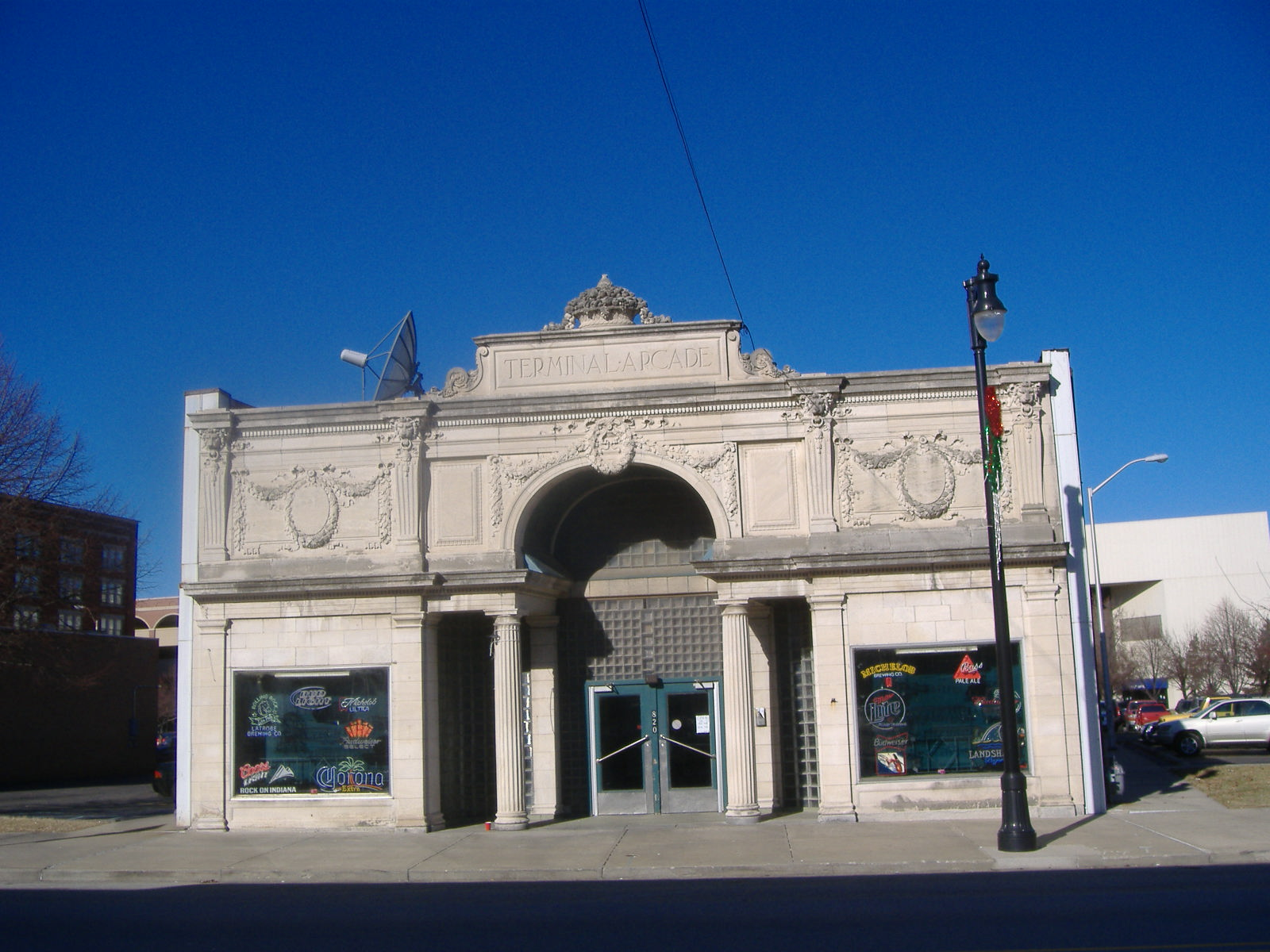

- Location within Vigo County, Indiana Location within Indiana Location within the United States
- Location: 820 Wabash Ave., Terre Haute, Indiana
- Coordinates: 39°28′0″N 87°24′17″W
- Area: less than one acre
- Built: 1911
- Architect: Burnham, Daniel H.
- Architectural style: Beaux Arts
- MPS: Downtown Terre Haute MRA
- NRHP reference No.: 83000159
- Added to NRHP: June 30, 1983

The Terminal Arcade, located on Wabash Avenue in downtown Terre Haute, Indiana, is a Beaux-Arts building on the National Register of Historic Places since June 30, 1983.

The building originally served as the Terre Haute, Indianapolis and Eastern Traction Company interurban station, opening in 1911. It was built on the grounds of the former J. S. Evans and Sons, a bicycle shop. The end of the interurban age came on January 11, 1940, when the track between Terre Haute and Indianapolis was closed, largely the result of automobiles making interurbans superfluous. From December 1, 1949, until 1972 the Arcade served as the city's union bus station.

The Beaux-Arts building is made of terra cotta and brick. It has identical facades on its north and south sides, constructed of limestone and with granite bases. Various designs carved upon the building include lions, garlands, and fruits. The building itself was designed by Daniel H. Burnham of Chicago; the facades were the work of Fred Edler and J. W. Quayle.

The other property in Terre Haute built by the Terre Haute, Indianapolis, and Eastern Traction Company was a power house at the corner of Mulberry and North Water. It was built in 1907 to power the interurbans the Terminal Arcade served, and the 457 miles of track the interurban ran upon. The 1907 lease, under the name of the Terre Haute Traction & Light Company, called for 999 years; interurbans were no more by 1940.

There have been threats to the Terminal Arcade. The mayor of Terre Haute Pete Chalos proposed condemning the building. In 2004, during talks for building a new federal building in Terre Haute, one of the proposals would have included razing the Terminal Arcade and placing the new building on its site.

As of August 2022, a new pub is expected to operate in the space, scheduled to open by late January 2023.

Preceding station	Terre Haute, Indianapolis and Eastern Traction Company	Following station
Terminus	Terre Haute–Indianapolis Line	Seelyville toward Indianapolis
City Limits toward Sullivan	Sullivan Line	Terminus
Woodley Street toward Clinton	Terre Haute – Clinton	Terminus
Stop 1 toward Paris	Paris–Terre Haute Line	Terminus
