= Southern Indiana Gas and Electric Company =

Power and Rail company

The Southern Indiana Gas and Electric Company was a power company and interurban railway in Indiana. It would acquire its corporate identity in 1921, after the Evansville and Southern Indiana Traction Company merged with the Evansville Public Service Company. The former was descendant from the first electric railway to operate in Evansville, which established service in 1903. The Public Service Company was incorporated in 1909 in order to provide electricity, steam, and hot water for Evansville. Rail service ended in 1933, though power delivery continued until 2000 when the company merged with Indiana Gas Company to become Vectren.

== History ==
=== Railway to Princeton ===
On September 18, 1901, the Evansville and Princeton Traction Company was incorporated by investors from Evansville and Richmond. By September 1902, construction on the 28-mile (45 km) line had advanced sufficiently to begin laying rails. The overhead construction and ballasting were not finished until next year; and difficulties in connecting the substation power plants delayed the opening of the line until December 8, 1903. By the following month, the line was taking in receipts of about $200 (Note: equivalent to $6,999 in 2024 adjusted for inflation) per day. The company desired that the line be extended north to Indianapolis either by building to Vincennes and Terre Haute to make connection with the Terre Haute–Indianapolis Line under construction, or by building northeast toward Indianapolis directly. The men proposed to build from Princeton to Petersburg and also construct branch lines to Owensville, Poseyville and New Harmony. The Murdock and Marshall families of Lafayette, who already controlled the Evansville city lines, proposed the plan of building from Princeton to Vincennes and also to Washington and Petersburg with that purpose, on June 28, 1906, the Evansville, Princeton and Vincennes Interurban Railway Company was incorporated. The stock of the Evansville and Princeton Traction Company passed into the hands of the new company and two years later the line came under the control of its new owners.

On December 24, 1908, a new corporation, the Evansville and Southern Indiana Traction Company, was incorporated to take over the Evansville city lines and the Princeton-Evansville railway and build others, probably from Evansville to Louisville. The new company took over the interurban line and the Evansville city railway properties at once. Despite being under the same corporate ownership, operations of the Princeton line were kept distinct from those of the other major interurban routes emanating from Evansville.

Within a few months the line between Evansville and Darmstadt was straightened; and as a step in the plan of building to Vincennes, the company began the construction of an extension from Princeton to Patoka. By February 1, 1908, the grading was done and within a few months the extension was placed in operation. A survey from Patoka to Hazelton was begun in October 1908 and in the same month the directors voted to construct the line to Terre Haute in the spring. The line would meet a similarly new southern extension of the Terre Haute, Indianapolis and Eastern Traction Company Sullivan Line to provide interchange. A strike of the operators, together with financial losses, need for new ties and rails, which had caused the State Railroad commission to list the line as "dead," made the financing of the extension impossible. In the summer of 1915 the proposal of the Terre Haute extension was fruitlessly revived. A line from Evansville would be a very desirable improvement because of the through traffic that could be carried between the two large cities. Being a short line radiating from a city, it was never as profitable as lines which could obtain through traffic between two large cities.

=== Merged from two companies ===
Because more power was needed and it seemed inadvisable to construct a new and larger power plant the Evansville and Southern Indiana Traction Company merged with the Evansville Public Service Company in March 1912. (After a suit in circuit court the merger was sustained and approved by the State Commerce commission January 5, 1917.) The Public Service Company of Evansville filed articles of incorporation on June 10, 1912, and acquired possession of the stock of the Evansville and Southern Indiana Traction Company.

The name of the holding company changed to Southern Indiana Gas and Electric Company on March 7, 1921. The company was controlled by the Union Railway, Gas and Electric company of Philadelphia through ownership of a majority of capital stock; and the latter was controlled in the same manner by the Commonwealth Power, Railway & Light Company of New York.

Interurban service ceased in 1933. The company merged with Indiana Gas Company in 2000 to form the modern Vectren corporation.

== Interurban route ==
The line crossed a branch of the Evansville and Terre Haute Railroad north of Fort Branch, and the main line at Princeton, the crossings being of the two-rail type. It also crossed the Evansville belt line in Evansville. The longest bridge along the route was the crossing of Pigeon Creek.
