= Indianapolis Traction Terminal =

Former interurban railway station in Indiana, US (1904–1972)

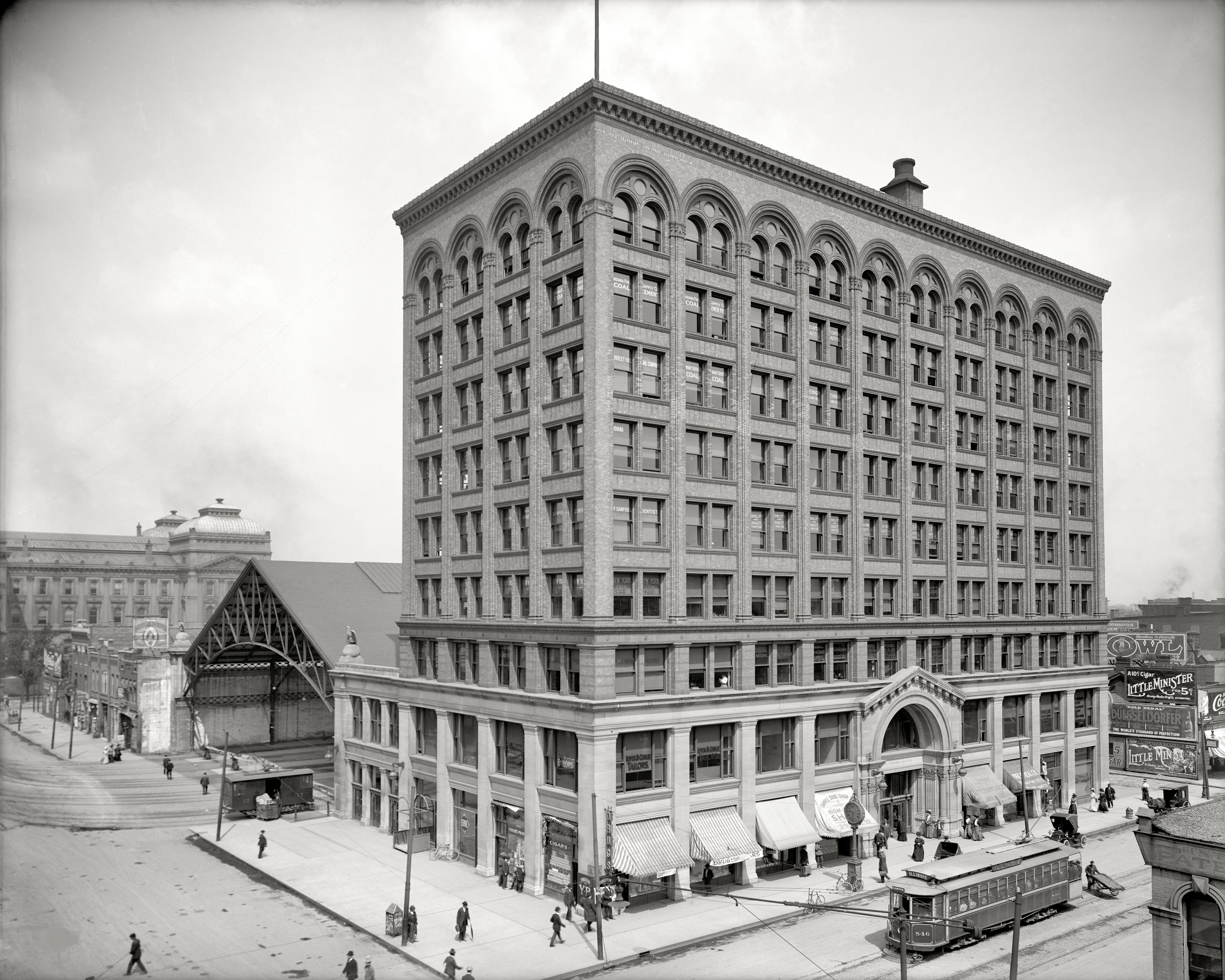
- The Indianapolis Traction Terminal in 1907

General information
- Location: Market & Illinois; Indianapolis, Indiana; United States
- Coordinates: 39°46′08.25″N 86°09′38″W
- Owner: Indianapolis Traction & Terminal Company
Services
Preceding station	Terre Haute, Indianapolis and Eastern Traction Company	Following station
Augustus toward Lafayette	Lafayette–Indianapolis Line	Terminus
Plainfield toward Terre Haute	Terre Haute–Indianapolis Line	Terminus
Speedway toward Crawfordsville	Ben Hur Route	Terminus
Maywood toward Martinsville	Martinsville Line	Terminus
Mt. Jackson toward Danville	Danville Line	Terminus
Terminus	Indianapolis–Richmond Line	Cumberland toward Richmond
Preceding station	Indiana Union Traction Company	Following station
Terminus	Indianapolis – Logansport/Peru	Broad Ripple toward Logansport or Peru
Terminus	Indianapolis – Muncie	Lawrence toward Muncie
Terminus	Honey Bee Route	Mt. Comfort toward New Castle
Terminus	Indianapolis – Ft. Benjamin Harrison	34th Street toward Ft. Benjamin Harrison
Preceding station	Indianapolis and Cincinnati Traction Company	Following station
Terminus	Indianapolis – Connersville	Shelbyville Junction toward Connersville
Terminus	Indianapolis – Greensburg	Connersville Junction toward Greensburg
Preceding station	Interstate Public Service	Following station
Terminus	Main Line	Perry toward Louisville
- Building details

General information
- Status: Demolished
- Construction started: July 1903
- Completed: September 1904
- Demolished: April 1972

Design and construction
- Architecture firm: D. H. Burnham & Company

References
Location

The Indianapolis Traction Terminal was a major interurban train station in downtown Indianapolis, Indiana. It was the largest interurban station in the world and at its peak handled 500 trains per day and seven million passengers per year. The station opened in 1904 and remained in use until 1941, when interurban operation ended. It continued to serve as a bus station until 1968 and was demolished in 1972. The Hilton Indianapolis now stands at its location.

== Design ==
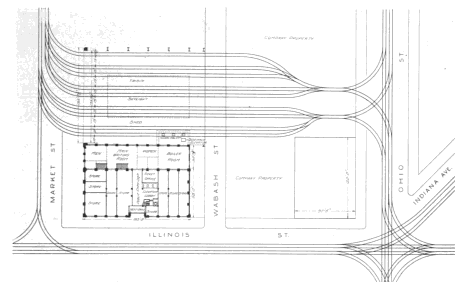
Diagram of the Indianapolis Traction Terminal complex. North is to the right.

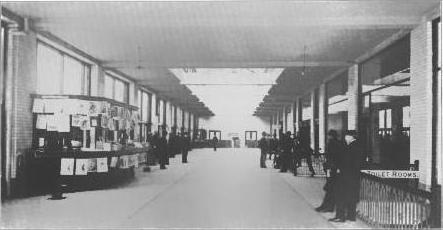
The waiting platform

The terminal was designed by D. H. Burnham & Company, an architectural firm based in Chicago. The terminal consisted of three parts: a nine-story office building, a passenger waiting platform, and an adjoining train shed.

The train shed was 133 feet 9 inches (40.77 m) wide and covered nine tracks. It was positioned north–south, with trains entering from Market Street and exiting to Ohio Street. The train shed severed Wabash Street.

East of the train shed was the waiting station. This consisted of a 37-foot-6-inch (11.43 m) by 137-foot (42 m) platform covered by a skylight, with waiting rooms underneath.

The office building stood nine stories tall and was 163 feet 8 inches (49.89 m) by 68 feet (21 m) at its base. The building's frame was constructed with steel. The exterior of the first two stories was covered in Bedford limestone, native to Indiana, while the remaining seven stories were "speckled brick."

The original complex included a freight-handling area in the northwest corner. By 1918 freight traffic outstripped the terminal's ability to handle it and the Terre Haute, Indianapolis and Eastern Traction Company constructed a separate freight station on Kentucky Avenue. All freight traffic to the terminal ended in 1924.

== History ==
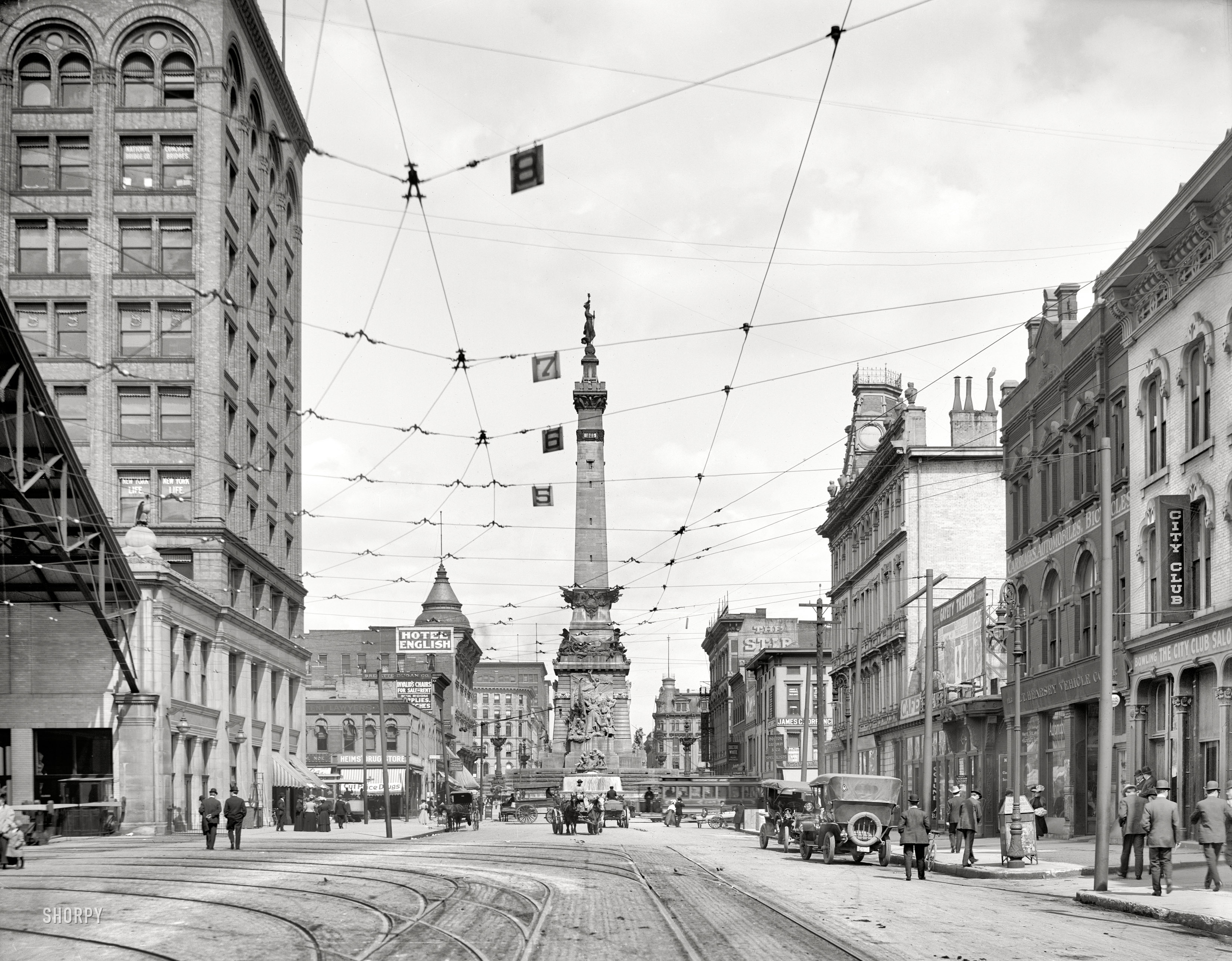
View of interurban tracks on the Market Street side of the Traction Terminal, with the Soldiers and Sailors Monument in the background to the east.

The terminal was the joint effort of seven interurban railroads which provided service to Indianapolis: Indiana Traction; Indianapolis and Eastern Railway; Indianapolis and Cincinnati Traction Company; Indianapolis, Columbus and Southern Traction Company; Indianapolis and Martinsville Rapid Transit Company; Indianapolis Coal Traction Company; and the Indianapolis and Northwestern Traction Company. Construction began in July 1903 and was completed in September 1904. The total cost of construction exceeded US$1,000,000. (Note: equivalent to $35.8 million in 2025 adjusted for inflation) It was the largest interurban station in the world.

Indianapolis stood at the center of a large interurban network; in 1914 the terminal handled 500 trains per day and seven million passengers per year. Interurban service to the terminal ended in 1941 as the industry collapsed. The tracks were paved over but the terminal remained in use as a bus station until October 1968, at which time the former train shed was removed. In April 1972 the office building was demolished as well. The Hilton Indianapolis, originally constructed as the headquarters of Blue Cross Blue Shield of Indiana (part of Anthem), now occupies the block.

When the Terminal's train shed was torn down in 1968, it was dismantled, not demolished. The structural steel girder sections were numbered and removed to the site of the Indiana Museum of Transport and Communication (known until its closure in 2023 as the Indiana Transportation Museum) in Forest Park, located in Noblesville, Indiana. The $10,500 (Note: equivalent to $97,213 in 2025 adjusted for inflation) cost for that portion of the project was almost entirely financed (all but $500 (Note: equivalent to $4,629 in 2025 adjusted for inflation)) by a donation from Ruth Lilly, and the original goal was to eventually reassemble the shed and use it to shelter the museum's existing and future railroad equipment collection. An adjoining two-story office and waiting room was envisioned, which was to include a scaled-down replica of the terminal's original waiting room. However, the plan languished due to the prohibitive projected cost of its reconstruction. The stacked girders remained untouched until the early 1980s, when they were finally hauled away as scrap.

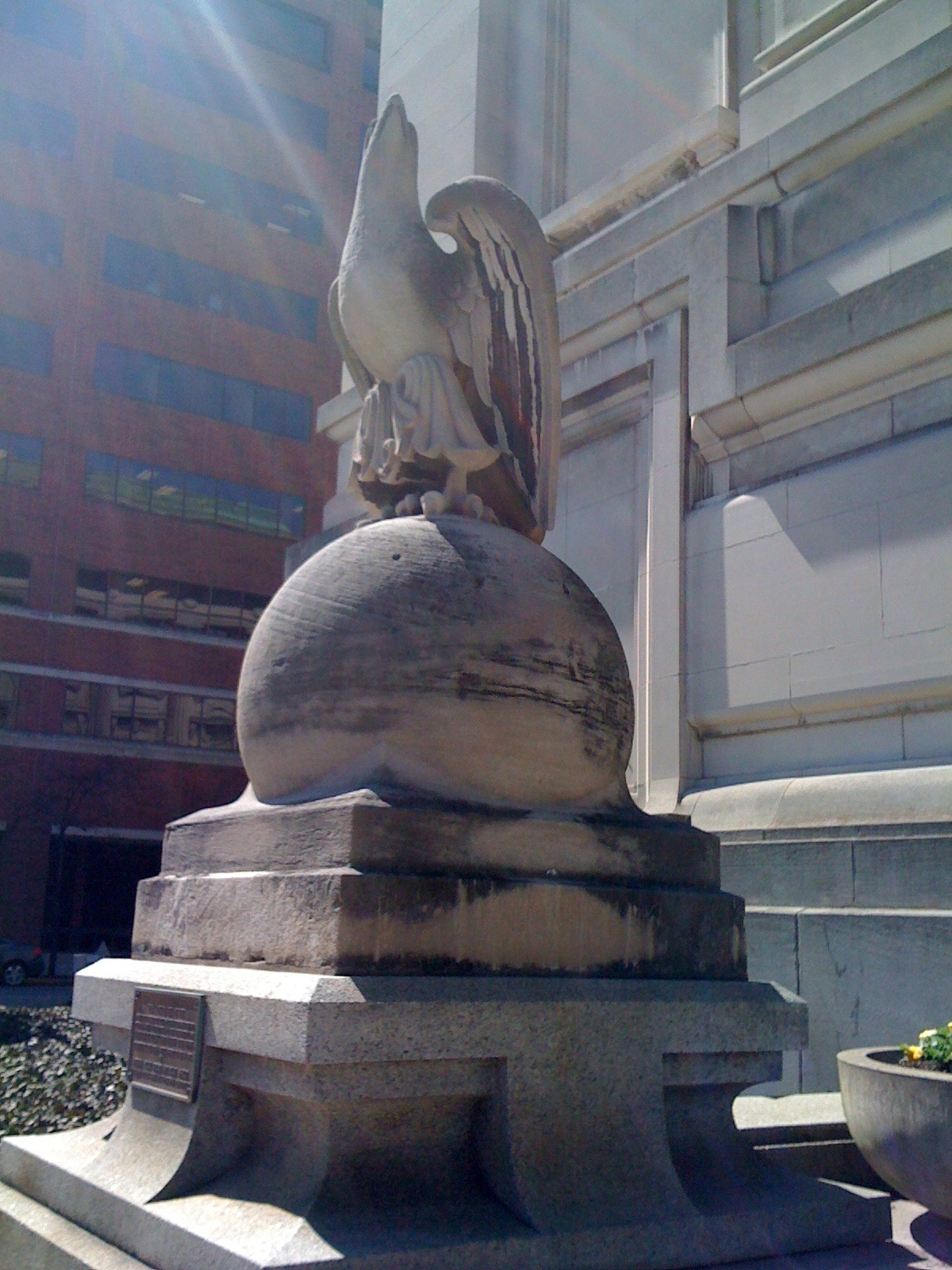
One of the stone eagle sculptures at Old Indianapolis City Hall in 2010.

The only surviving remnants of the complex today are two stone eagle sculptures that once flanked either side of the train shed. They were removed in 1968 and are now located on the steps of the Old Indianapolis City Hall.

== See also ==
- Streetcars in Indianapolis
- List of destroyed heritage of the United States
