= Lafayette–Indianapolis Line =

Overview
- Locale: Indiana
- Termini: Indianapolis Traction Terminal; Lafayette

Service
- System: Terre Haute, Indianapolis and Eastern Traction Company

History
- Opened: December 2, 1903
- Closed: October 31, 1930

Technical
- Character: Interurban
- Track gauge: 1,435 mm (4 ft 8 1/2 in) standard gauge
- Electrification: 550 V DC

The Lafayette–Indianapolis Line was an interurban railway in Indiana. It ran between its namesake cities of Indianapolis and Lafayette between 1903 and 1930.

== History ==
In November 1900 a group of promoters began securing franchises and right-of-ways along the Lafayette pike and the following February they incorporated the Indianapolis & Lebanon Traction Company. The company decided to build as far as Frankfort and obtained the necessary franchises. The towns of Traders Point and Royalton offered liberal stock subscriptions in return for building the railway along the Lafayette pike, while Zionsville and Whitestown offered stock subscriptions and a generous subsidy. The latter route was chosen. A few months later George Townsend and William S. Reed, who had purchased interests in the line, reorganized the company, calling it the Indianapolis, Lebanon and Frankfort Traction company.

The parties who had been engaged in ballasting the track of the Indianapolis & Shelbyville Traction company began work on the Indianapolis to Lafayette line. A $200,000 (Note: $7.27 million in 2024 adjusted for inflation) power plant was constructed at Lebanon. Some surveys were made for a contemplated extension of the line to Chicago but nothing would come of this. On December 17, 1902, the company had changed its name to Indianapolis and Northwestern Traction Company.

The line was completed in the fall of 1903, though service wasn't started immediately due to a delay in shipping new rolling stock. The Central Union Telephone company of Chicago brought federal suit and injunction proceedings to restrain the traction company from turning on the current in the trolley wires, declaring that it would damage their circuits. The court finally permitted the current to be turned on. The full line to Lafayette was completed on December 2, 1903.

In May, 1905, a situation arose where the steam lines from Indianapolis to Chicago had all agreed to run no excursions to Chicago that summer. The Monon Railroad advertised in Indianapolis for an excursion from Lafayette to Chicago in cooperation with the Indianapolis and Northwestern Traction Company. The excursion was run in spite of the protests and threats of the steam lines. The entire following summer a similar arrangement was made with the Toledo, St. Louis and Western Railroad at Frankfort to run to Detroit, Toledo and St. Louis.

Starting April 1, 1907, the Indianapolis & Northwestern Traction company was leased by the Terre Haute, Indianapolis & Eastern Traction Company for a period of 999 years, the lessee to pay taxes, bond interest, preferred dividends, maintain property and pay $500 annually for upkeep of organization.

There were rumors in the spring of 1906 concerning a line to be built from Lafayette to Williamsport and Danville, Illinois. In the same year some Montmorenci and Otterbein citizens promoted a line west from Lafayette to Bloomington or Danville, Illinois. A further plan contemplated the construction of a line from Lafayette to Williamsport and to State Line City.

Service along the line was abandoned with several other THI&E routes on October 31, 1930.

== Lebanon to Crawfordsville Line ==
The Crawfordsville Traction company was incorporated January 9, 1901 by Crawfordsville men who contemplated building lines in Crawfordsville and Montgomery County. The following year the directors decided to make Indianapolis a terminus, for which purpose the principal stockholders of the Traction company organized the Consolidated Traction Company, and included in the directorate some of the stockholders of the old Indianapolis and Lebanon Traction Company and the Lafayette and Indianapolis Traction Company who had been unsuccessful in their contests with Townsend and Reed, of the Indianapolis and Northwestern Traction Company, for the ownership of the right-of-way between Indianapolis and Lebanon. The Consolidated inherited all the animosities of its various constituents. The struggle with Townsend and Reed was resumed, the dispute being over the possession of a city franchise in Crawfordsville. The city would grant but one franchise, and this franchise was eagerly sought by both companies because each wished to control the line that the other must be compelled to use.

The city council voted to grant the Indianapolis and Northwestern Traction Company the right to use Main Street and almost at once revoked the privileges notwithstanding the company had deposited the necessary bond. The company began to lay track on Main Street; the city thereupon brought against the aggressors a suit of contempt which was dismissed upon petition of one thousand citizens of Crawfordsville. Grading had commenced by January 1904 and featured an 18-mile (29 km) tangent which ran along a section line. Although the Consolidated Traction Company continued the struggle with energy, the Indianapolis and Northwestern Traction Company secured the necessary franchises and laid its track with service starting on July 1, 1904. Consolidated Traction's failure to build the line prompted its promoters to start planning a direct route between Indianapolis and Crawfordsville.
