= Danville station (disambiguation) =

Danville station may refer to:

- Danville station, Virginia
- Danville station (California)
- Danville station (Indiana)
- Junction City, Kentucky
