= Fort Harrison Terminal Station =

- U.S. National Register of Historic Places
- U.S. Historic district – Contributing property
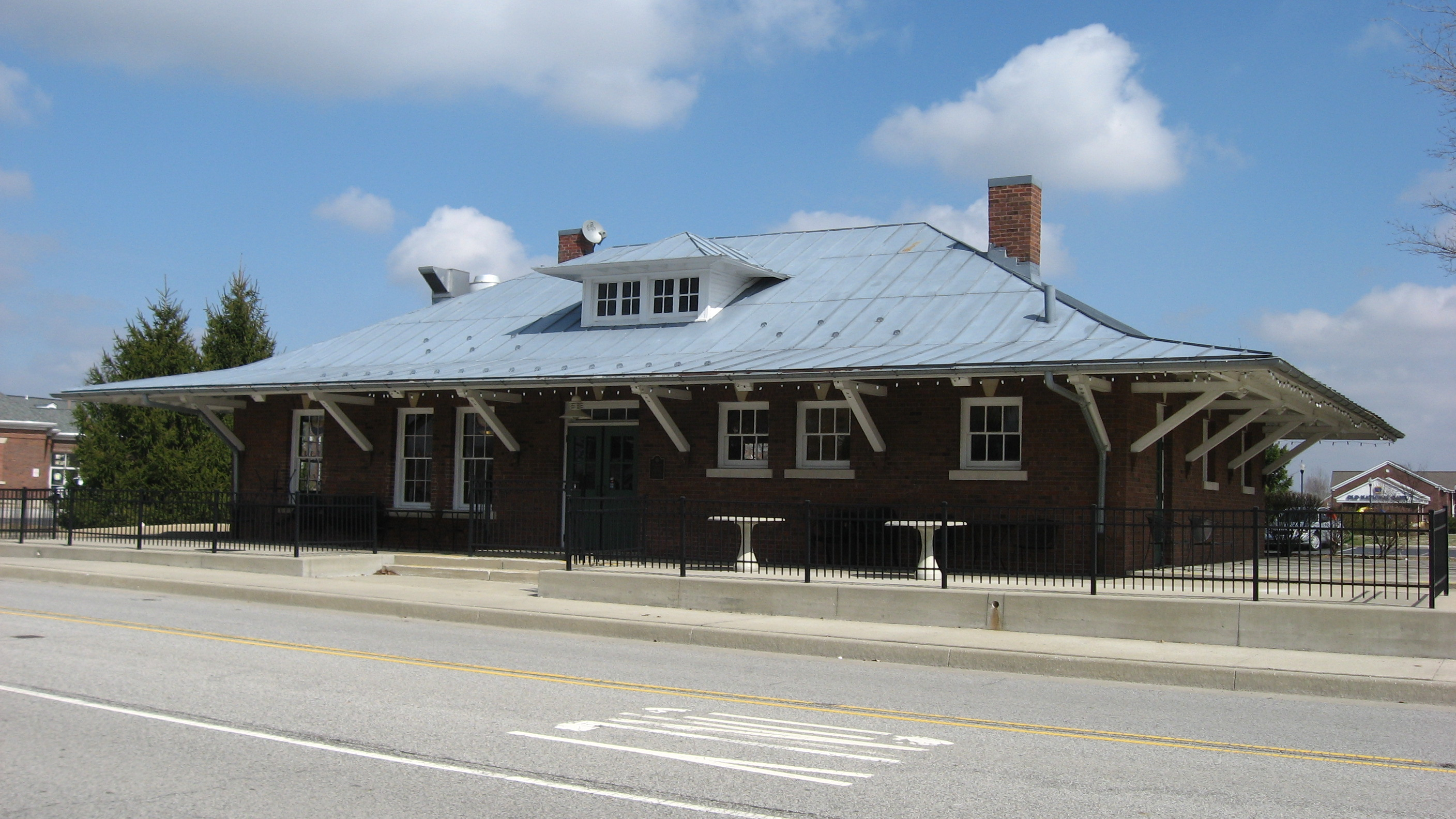
- Fort Harrison Terminal Station, March 2011

- Location within Indianapolis Location within Indiana Location within the United States
- Location: Building 616, Fort Benjamin Harrison, Lawrence Township, Marion County, Indiana
- Coordinates: 39°51′21″N 86°0′48″W
- Area: less than one acre
- Built: 1908
- Architectural style: Bungalow/craftsman, Prairie School
- NRHP reference No.: 84001127

Significant dates
- Added to NRHP: March 16, 1984
- Designated CP: September 6, 1995

Fort Harrison Terminal Station, also known as Fort Harrison Post Office, is a historic train station located at Fort Benjamin Harrison in suburban Lawrence Township, Marion County, Indiana, northeast of Indianapolis, Indiana. It was built in 1908, and is a one-story, brick building with Prairie School and Bungalow / American Craftsman style design elements. It has a low, double pitched hipped roof sheathed in metal. It served as a terminal for the interurban Union Traction Company until 1941, after which it housed a U.S. Post Office. It has been converted into a Mexican restaurant.

It was added to the National Register of Historic Places in 1984. It was additionally deemed a contributing property of the Fort Benjamin Harrison Historic District upon its designation in 1995.

== See also ==
- National Register of Historic Places listings in Marion County, Indiana

| Preceding station | Indiana Union Traction Company | Following station |
|---|---|---|
| Spring Valley toward Indianapolis | Indianapolis – Ft. Benjamin Harrison | Terminus |
