= Honey Bee Route =

Overview
- Other name: Indianapolis–New Castle Line
- Locale: Indiana
- Termini: Indianapolis Traction Terminal; New Castle

Service
- System: Indiana Union Traction Company (1912–1930); Indiana Railroad (1930–1937)

History
- Opened: January 1910
- Closed: May 9, 1937

Technical
- Character: Interurban
- Track gauge: 1,435 mm (4 ft 8 1/2 in) standard gauge

The Honey Bee Route was an interurban railway line in Indiana. It ran from Indianapolis to New Castle. In its final years, it would provide the eastern connection between the Indiana Railroad for service to Ohio.

== History ==
In July 1903, Charles S. Hernley, a railway promoter and politician, in collaboration with W. W. and W. J. Hubbard and Charles T. Boyle began organizing a company for the purpose of building a line to Newcastle through Shirley and along the Eastern Division of the Peoria and Eastern Railroad. Finally on November 7, 1903, the Newcastle and Winchester Traction Company was incorporated. The Indianapolis to Newcastle section of road was to be completed first, but connection in Ohio was to be made later with Dayton and Columbus lines; Toledo, Ohio was the ultimate objective. The following year, another company was organized by the promoters, called the Indianapolis, Newcastle and Toledo Electric Railway Company. Branches were intended to be built from Newcastle to all of the surrounding territory.

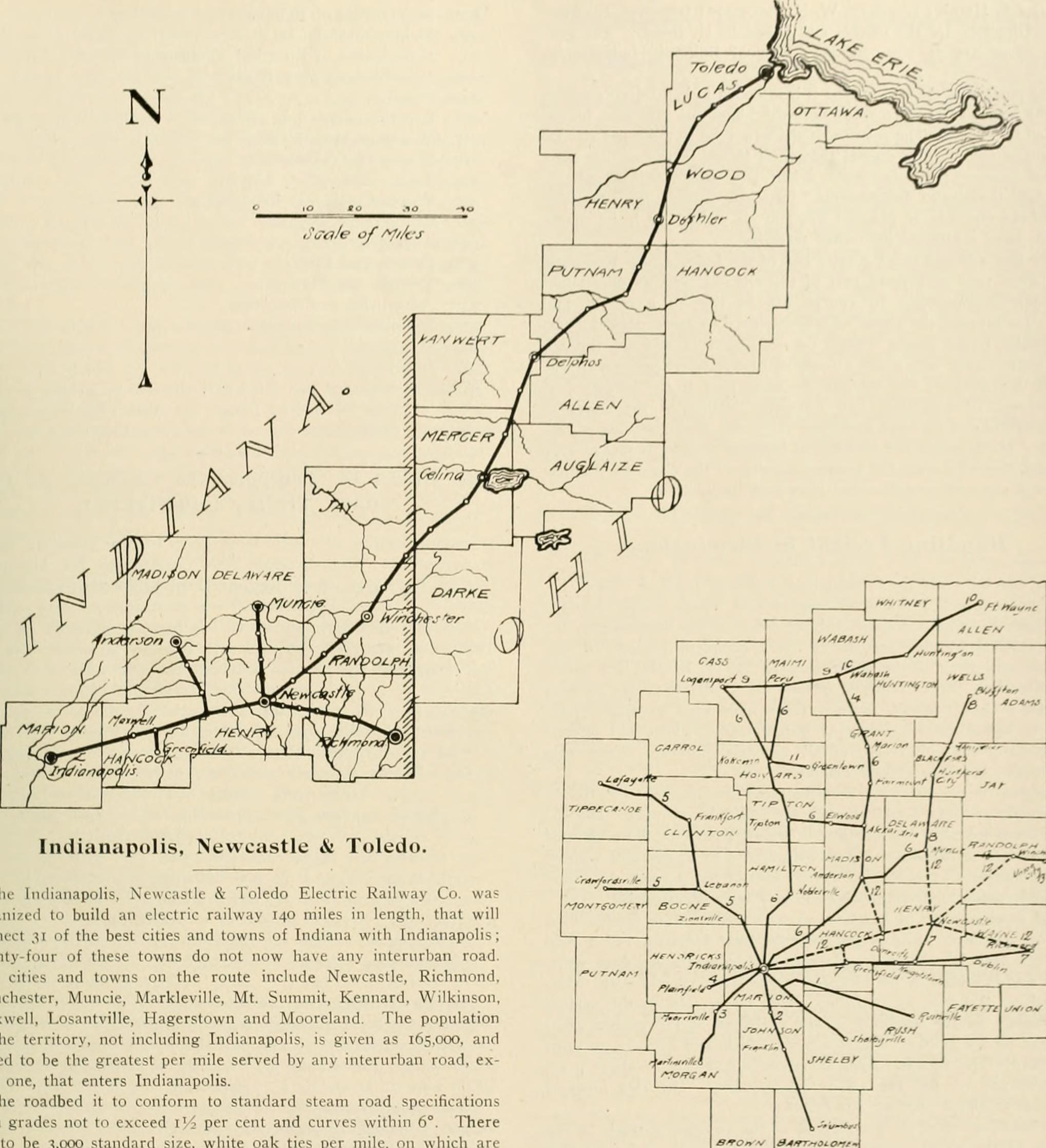
The Indianapolis, Newcastle and Toledo Electric Railway Company was a competing plan to build an interurban route through New Castle and across the Ohio state line to Toledo.

In March 1905, the city of Indianapolis granted a franchise permitting the use of certain streets for an entrance and provided for the construction of a belt line around the city to pass through Millersburg, Lawrence, Mallot Park, Mt. Nebo, Broad Ripple, Poplar Grove, Flackville, through Eagle Creek Valley, past the State Fair grounds and through the army post. At Millersburg it would connect with the main line to Newcastle.

By July 1905, all stock had been sold and in the same month a $4,500,000 (Note: equivalent to $161,250,000 in 2025 adjusted for inflation) bond issue was taken by New York City capitalists. Spurs from Newcastle were surveyed to Muncie, Winchester and Richmond. The Electrical Equipment Company of Chicago was awarded the contract for constructing the road and Allis-Chambers Company of Philadelphia was given the contract for furnishing electrical equipment. The project had been dubbed the Wild Flower and Honey Bee Route around this time, reportedly stemming from an incident with the surveying team and a beehive near Maxwell.

One hundred teams began grading at Newcastle, August 14, 1906. The following month a $40,000 (Note: equivalent to $1,433,333 in 2025 adjusted for inflation) power plant was started at the Elliot farm near Newcastle. One of the chief engineering difficulties encountered was the Blue River Valley grade which was a mile long and required several hundred men nearly a year to complete. During November 1907, the Electrical Installation Company completed the grading and was engaged in laying track.

The plan was halted as a result of the panic of 1907. Because of failure to pay the contractors, a lien of $150,000 (Note: equivalent to $5,183,036 in 2025 adjusted for inflation) was filed against the interurban company and a receiver requested. No opposition was offered by the defendants to the suit and the Union Trust Company of Indianapolis was named receiver. The receiver and creditors agreed that receivers certificates to the amount of $450,000 (Note: equivalent to $15,549,107 in 2025 adjusted for inflation) were needed and would be issued to complete the line.

After considerable litigation the court ordered an issue of receivers' certificates and the line was pushed to completion. The first part to be opened was the section between Newcastle and Shirley, which was operated in January 1910; the first car to make the trip to Indianapolis was run April 4, 1910. Regular service was not opened at once because of difficulty in arranging connection with the city line at Indianapolis. The company desired the use of 18th, 19th or Park Streets in order to reach Massachusetts Avenue, but these entrances were refused by the Board of Works and the company was compelled to use 20th street. Permission to use the street was granted May 18 and by the first of July the track was completed and regular passenger and freight service between Indianapolis and Newcastle was established.

The Indianapolis, Newcastle & Eastern Traction Company was incorporated June 1, 1912, which purchased the insolvent railway's assets and reissued new stock. The properties were leased October 25, 1912 to the Union Traction Company.

The line was retained under consolidation of central Indiana's major interurbans, becoming a component of the Indiana Railroad system. Starting in January 1932, service between Indianapolis and Dunreith on the ex-Terre Haute, Indianapolis and Eastern Traction Company Richmond Line was discontinued, forcing Richmond-bound trains to run to New Castle along the Honey Bee Route then south along the Dunreith–New Castle branch to the Richmond Line. The final cars ran along the line on May 9, 1937.
