= Hilton Indianapolis =

High-rise hotel in Indianapolis, Indiana, US

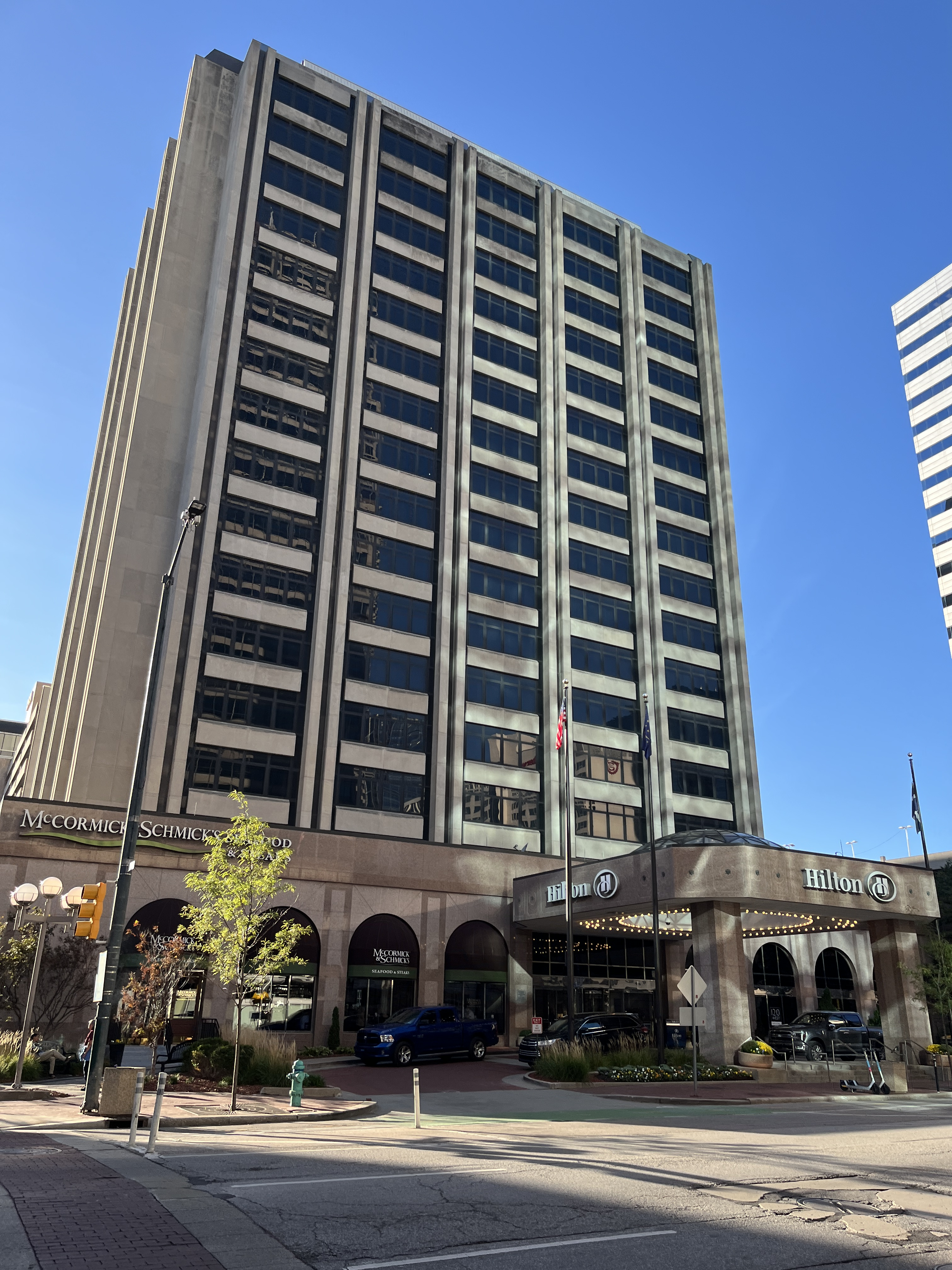
- Front of hotel in 2024

General information
- Type: Hotel
- Location: 120 West Market Street; Indianapolis, Indiana
- Coordinates: 39°46′08.25″N 86°09′38″W
- Completed: 1971

Height
- Roof: 302 ft (92 m)

Technical details
- Floor count: 18

Design and construction
- Architects: Lennox, Matthews, Simmons & Ford, Inc.

The Hilton Indianapolis Hotel & Suites is a hotel in Indianapolis, Indiana. The structure was completed as an office building in 1971 and converted to a hotel in 2000. It has 18 floors with a total of 332 rooms. The Hilton was formerly the tallest hotel in the city; the JW Marriott Indianapolis surpassed it when it was completed in 2011.

== History ==
The location was formerly the site of the Traction Terminal Building, a covered depot for the interurban lines in Indianapolis. A 9-story office building adjoined the depot.

The hotel is built of structural concrete with a limestone facade. The building was originally constructed in 1971 as the headquarters of Blue Cross and Blue Shield of Indiana (now Anthem), which vacated the building in the 1990s. It was refurbished into a hotel and opened as an Adam's Mark hotel in May 2000. In August 2004 it was rebranded as a Hilton.

According to the Indianapolis Business Journal, the Hilton Indianapolis was last renovated in 2017. As of 2020, two dining options were located in the hotel, including 120 West Bar & Grill and McCormick & Schmick's.

== See also ==
- List of tallest buildings in Indianapolis
- List of tallest buildings in Indiana
