= Terre Haute–Indianapolis Line =

Overview
- Locale: Indiana
- Termini: Indianapolis Traction Terminal; Terminal Arcade

Service
- System: Terre Haute, Indianapolis and Eastern Traction Company (c. 1908–1931); Indiana Railroad (1931–1940)

History
- Opened: July 16, 1893
- Completed: January 25, 1908
- Closed: January 10, 1940

Technical
- Character: Interurban
- Track gauge: 1,435 mm (4 ft 8 1/2 in) standard gauge

The Terre Haute–Indianapolis Line was an interurban railway line in Indiana. Segments of the line dating back to 1893 were the earliest interurban railroads to operate in the state. At its full length, it connected two of the state's major hubs of interurban traffic: the Traction Terminal in Indianapolis and the Terminal Arcade in Terre Haute. Service was abandoned in 1940.

== History ==
The region around Terre Haute enjoyed an unusual share of early promotions. Before the feasibility of extending electric lines over the rough country roads and fields had been demonstrated in Indiana, several street railways organized in Terre Haute and Brazil, Indiana, whose purpose was to build lines on city streets and on roads leading out of the city. The Brazil Rapid Transit Street Railway Company incorporated in 1892. The organizers declared their intention of building a line from Cottage Hill Cemetery in Brazil to Knightsville and Harmony along the National Road. The line began operations July 16, 1893, as the first interurban electric line in the state of Indiana. The company which actually built the Terre Haute connection was the Terre Haute Electrical Company, which completed construction of the line in September 1900. The Terre Haute Electrical Company was reorganized as the Terre Haute Electric Traction Company in 1903 with the purpose of building lines radiating from the city.

While the Terre Haute Electric was promoting its line to Brazil, an independent line was being promoted from Indianapolis to Plainfield. At the end of 1901, the Indianapolis and Plainfield Electric Railroad Company was organized to build it. A competing firm was in the process of building its own line along the route, but was preempted by the Indianapolis and Plainfield opening on September 16, 1902. The Indianapolis and Plainfield Electric Railroad merged with the Danville and Cartersburg Railroad Company in 1903 to form the Indianapolis Coal Traction Company. When the Indianapolis Coal line was built from Greencastle to Brazil in 1906–1907, the track of the Brazil Rapid Transit Street Railway was used for most of the distance between Harmony and Brazil.

In 1905, the Dolan-Morgan-McGowan syndicate purchased the Plainfield line and in September began unloading ties at Greencastle for a western extension of their Danville Line. The syndicate changed its plans the following summer due to threatened resistance by the Vandalia Railroad, which alleged that the traction company could not legally build from Plainfield because the terms of the Danville franchise required an extension from that place. As a result, the syndicate surveyed a route from Plainfield to Greencastle. In June 1906, contracts were let; and the next month the Greencastle–Harmony link was begun. Regular service was inaugurated between Plainfield and Greencastle on July 4, 1907; in the following January the Greencastle–Harmony section was completed and through cars began running between Terre Haute and Indianapolis. Through limited service was established the next July.

From the first the Brazil merchants complained about the rates to Indianapolis. In retaliation for alleged discrimination in the rates, city merchants filed a petition asking the court to enjoin the Terre Haute, Indianapolis and Eastern Traction Company (who had assumed operation of the line) from operating interurban cars in Brazil, declaring that the company held franchise rights for operation of city cars only. The city officials also filed thirty suits against the company under a statute that limited the speed of electric cars inside the city limits to six miles per hour (9.7 km/h). Terre Haute also attempted to wring fare reductions from the company by filing an injunction suit in 1910 that alleged that the act of 1901 authorized the interurbans to carry freight only in the country. After a wearying and fruitless litigation lasting over two years the State Railroad Commission fixed an equitable tariff of rates.

The line was maintained by the Indiana Railroad after its absorption of the THI&E. Passenger service ended on January 10, 1940. Trucks had been put in service to replace freight service about a week earlier, and eight buses were put on an hourly schedule as replacement passenger accommodation.

== Route ==
Outside of Terre Haute where the Southern Indiana Railway and the line intersect, the former passed over the electric line on a long wooden trestle. At the Glen Stock Farm, the second siding out of Terre Haute, the line passed over the tracks of the Vandalia Railroad. A steel viaduct (Figs. 23 and 24) several hundred feet in length carries the track at this point.
