= Martinsville Line =

Railroad line in Indiana, United States

Overview
- Locale: Indiana
- Termini: Indianapolis Traction Terminal; Martinsville station

Service
- System: Terre Haute, Indianapolis and Eastern Traction Company

History
- Opened: August 11, 1902
- Closed: October 31, 1930

Technical
- Character: Interurban
- Track gauge: 1,435 mm (4 ft 8 1/2 in) standard gauge

The Martinsville Line was an interurban railway route in Indiana. It ran between Martinsville and the state capital of Indianapolis.

Schemes to connect Martinsville to Indianapolis via an electric railway date back to 1893, though success would not come until the Indianapolis and Martinsville Rapid Transit Company, incorporated in 1901. Construction was started in short time and by November the roadbed was graded as far as Mooresville. Hourly service as far as Mooresville began August 11, 1902. The first car was run into Indianapolis on April 15, 1903, with regular service beginning a few days later. The downtown terminal was at Washington Street and Kentucky Avenue.

In 1903, a survey was made for an extension to Bloomington; an entrance into the coal field through Paragon, Gosport, Spencer, Northington, Clinton, and Sullivan was also considered. The engineering difficulties which the area has always presented, together with the meager prospect for traffic, discouraged these extensions.

In June 1905, a Boston-based syndicate headed by Stone and Webster, who were investors in the Terre Haute lines, bought capital stock in the company, obtaining the controlling vote. The entire stock was soon transferred to the Schoepf-McGowan syndicate and was thereafter held by the Terre Haute, Indianapolis and Eastern Traction Company. The line was then leased back to the THI&E starting in April 1907 under a term of 999 years.

Service along the line was abandoned with several other THI&E routes on October 31, 1930.
