= Dayton and Western Traction Company =

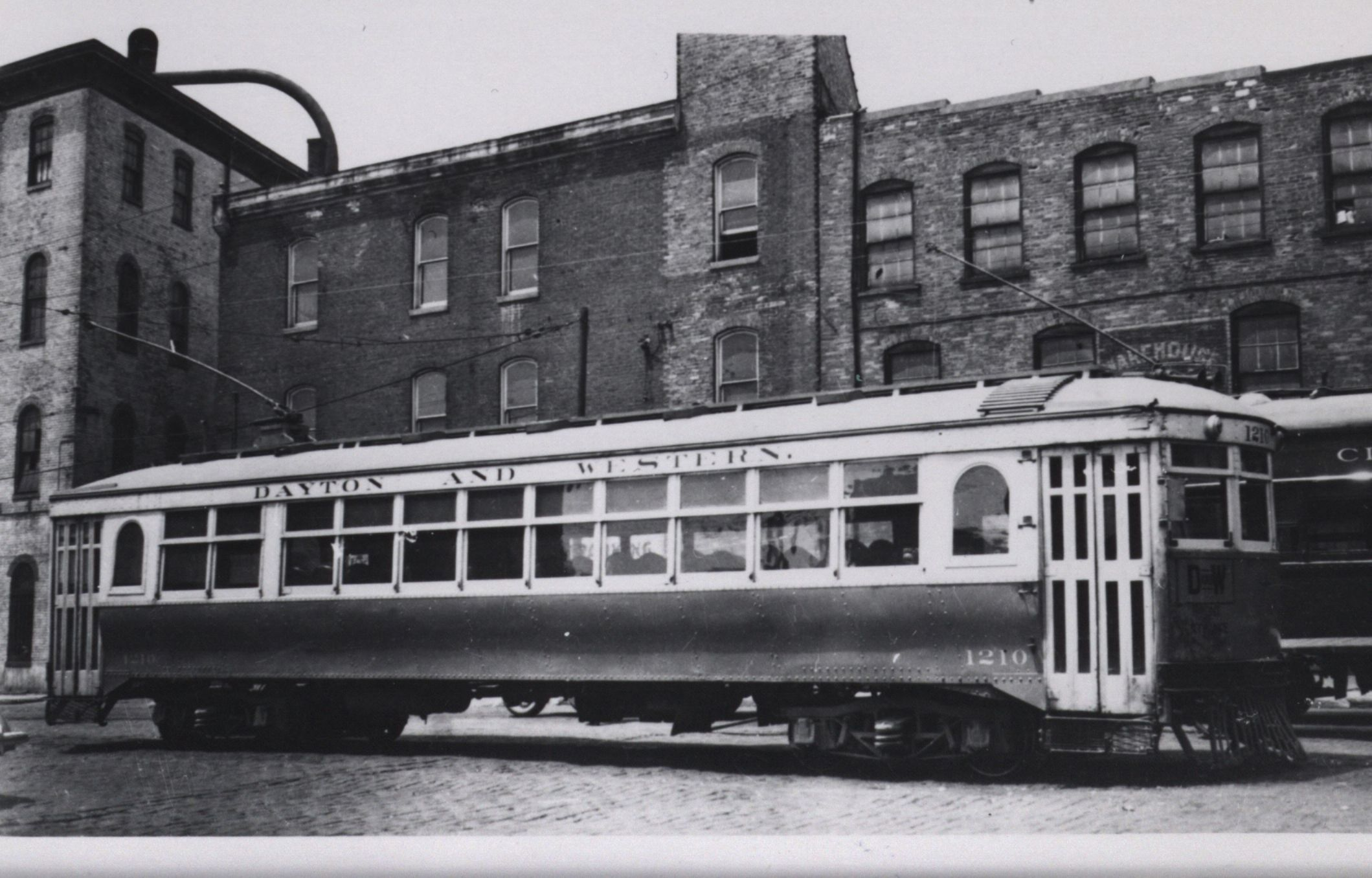
Dayton & Western Traction Company car 1210

The Dayton and Western Traction Company was an interurban railway which operated in Ohio and Indiana. It provided a direct connection between the interurban networks of the two states, running between Dayton, Ohio and Richmond, Indiana.

On June 26, 1898, the Dayton and Western began operations from Dayton west to Eaton, Ohio. In contrast to the failure to unite the traction system of Indiana with that of its western neighbor, the McKinley system, connection with the Ohio group was not only established early but was established at three different points. While an Ohio company, the Dayton and Western Traction Company, was promoting and building a line from Dayton to Eaton, Ohio, traction men of Indiana were endeavoring to raise capital and secure subsidies and franchises for a line from Richmond to Eaton, Ohio. A group of men headed by Dr. Lowes, the promoter of the Dayton, Ohio-Union City line, demanded a $100,000 subsidy at Richmond in the fall of 1898; Frederick Wesson, a New York millionaire, and Henry Dinden of Dayton, purchased part of the right-of-way for a line and placed orders for part of the material in the spring of 1900. The owners of the Richmond city railway line organized the Dayton and Richmond Traction Company and were given some franchises over the route. On April 22, 1902, several Greenville, Ohio, men incorporated a company which was to build from Richmond to Greenville, Ohio.

The final rail was laid on the Richmond connection on July 24, 1903, commencing interstate service. The Indianapolis and Eastern Railway had begun running between Richmond and Indianapolis a few weeks earlier, and the Indianapolis–Richmond Line provided the key western entry to the Indiana interurban network. After completion of the roadway, the Indiana company was leased by the Ohio parent line. The Schoepf-McGowan interests were eager to buy the road but refused to pay the $3,000,000 which was asked. They selected another route and declared that a competing line would be built. In the same year the Ohio Electric Company, which was controlled by the Schoepf-McGowan syndicate, leased the Dayton and Western Traction Company.

The line was brought under the umbrella of the Ohio Electric Railway starting in 1907. The line was buoyed by its interstate connection and was kept in operation, despite not being profitable itself, to maintain its interchange business. Starting April 25, 1920, the Dayton and Western Traction company has operated as an independent line. It also operated through cars between Indianapolis and Dayton over the tracks of the Terre Haute, Indianapolis and Eastern Traction Company. The railroad would go on to see several owners over the next few years. After bankruptcy in 1931, the line would pass into the hands of the Cincinnati and Lake Erie Railroad who in turn sold it to a trust company in 1936. The Indiana Railroad would go on to lease the line, operating it for nine months before ending service on May 9, 1937.
