= Danville station (Indiana) =

Danville

General information
- Location: Indiana Street; Danville, Indiana
- Coordinates: 39.7600°N 86.5228°W

History
- Closed: October 1930

Services
Preceding station	Terre Haute, Indianapolis and Eastern Traction Company	Following station
Terminus	Danville Line	Hadley toward Indianapolis
Location

Danville station is a former interurban railway station in Danville, Indiana, located at the corner of Marion Street and Indiana Street. It was the terminal of the Danville branch. Service between Danville and Avon began on September 1, 1905. The station building was constructed by the Terre Haute, Indianapolis and Eastern Traction Company between 1907 and 1920. Interurban service ceased in October 1930. After rail service ended, the building served as an automotive repair garage.
