= Indianapolis–Logansport/Peru Line =

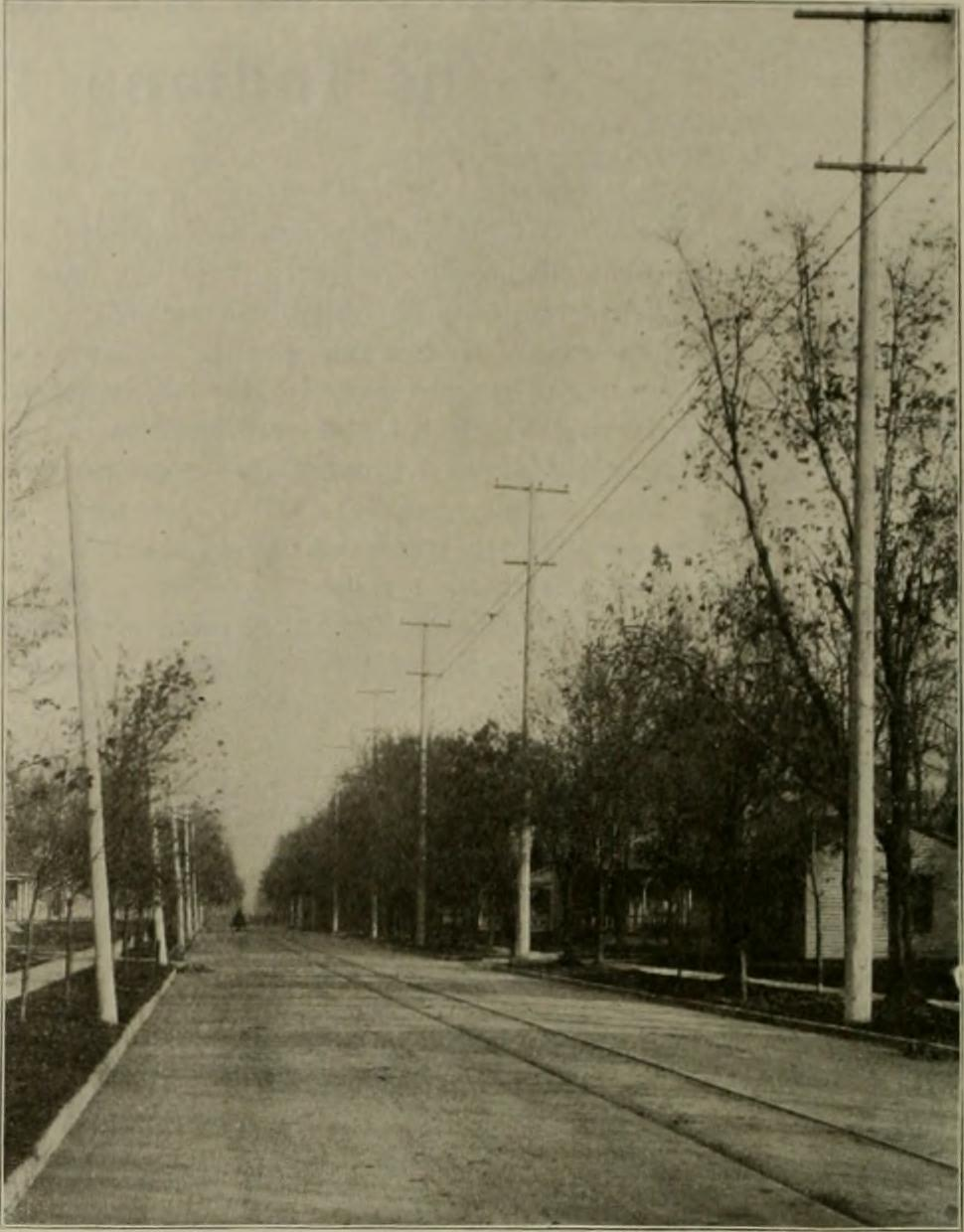
- North Street in Noblesville, 1904

Overview
- Locale: Indiana
- Termini: Indianapolis Traction Terminal; Peru, Logansport (until 1930), continuing service to Fort Wayne

Service
- System: Indiana Union Traction Company (1903–1930); Indiana Railroad (1930–1938)

History
- Opened: October 31, 1903
- Closed: September 6, 1938 (passenger); September 11, 1938 (freight)

Technical
- Character: Interurban
- Track gauge: 1,435 mm (4 ft 8 1/2 in) standard gauge

The Indianapolis–Logansport/Peru Line was an interurban railway line in Indiana. Opening in 1903, it ran north from Indianapolis to Kokomo where it split to two branches, one running to Logansport and the other to Peru. It would provide interchanges with several other interurban railroads in the region, including the Winona Interurban Railway which would form a spine of services in the center of the state running north and south, as well as the Indiana Service Corporation line to Fort Wayne. The segment between Kokomo and Logansport was abandoned in 1930, but the Peru line would continue under the consolidated Indiana Railroad to be incorporated into one of the company's two routes between Indianapolis and Fort Wayne. Rail services ceased in 1938, replaced by buses and trucking.

== History ==
In March 1900, Horace C. Stillwell, the pioneer and successful financier of early electric lines, and Charles A. Ford, incorporated the Central Traction Company with the purpose of connecting Indianapolis and Kokomo. All franchises were obtained, bonds were sold to New York brokers, and contracts were let but no work was done that fall. A new contract was awarded in October 1901 to R. L. Kirkpatrick & Company of Anderson, and grading began north of Arcadia. The first plan was to touch Broad Ripple, Westfield, and Arcadia and run north through Kokomo where a spur was to connect with Tipton; but, owing to difficulties with the city officials at Noblesville, the route was made to turn east from that point toward Elwood. Some construction was done the following spring. It was rumored that Indiana Union Traction Company interests were working in harmony with the constructing company.

The rumor was verified; on April 14, 1892, the Indianapolis and Northern Traction Company, a $3,500,000 corporation was incorporated by those interested in the Union Traction Company. The articles of incorporation stated that the purpose of the company was to "build, buy or rent" lines of electric railway in any of the cities north and east of Indianapolis. The new company resumed the work of constructing the grade at the point where the Indiana Central Railway Company stopped. The town of Carmel offered to obtain the right-of-way gratis between Broad Ripple and Carmel if the line were run through that place. In May, ties were distributed and grading was begun on the southern end of the line. On July 16, 1902, the stockholders of the Union Traction Company after considerable internal opposition voted to lease and later to merge with the Indianapolis and Northern Traction Company. In May 1903 the merging of the two companies was ratified by the two boards of directors. After uniting with the Indiana Northern Traction Company the Union Traction Company was said to be the largest traction corporation in the world. For the year ending December 31, 1901, nearly a million dollars was received from operating revenues. In January 1902 stock sold for 45; in January 1903 it sold for 91.

A dispute over the right-of-way through the reservoir of the American Straw Board Company of Noblesville delayed construction. The first southbound car through Carmel ran on October 31, 1903, and cars to Tipton began on a regular two hour schedule within a few days.

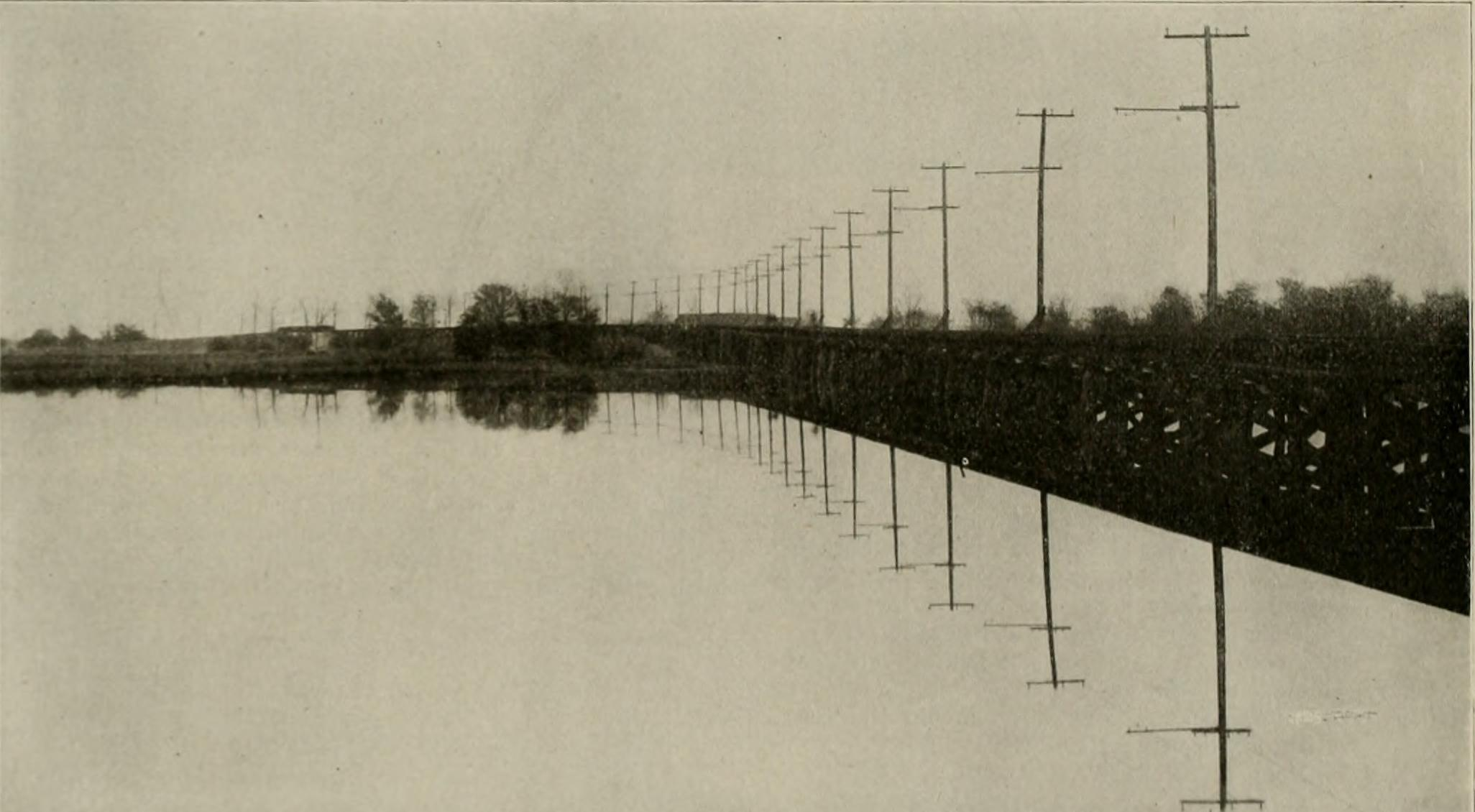
Trestle across a strawboard filter bed near Noblesville, 1904

The line entered Indianapolis through Broad Ripple over the tracks of the Broad Ripple Traction company, most of whose stock was held by the same persons that owned that of the Union Traction company. The short line was absorbed and managed by the Indiana Union Traction company in January 1905.

In March 1896, C. E. Everetts had promoted a line from Logansport to Indianapolis via Burlington, Frankfort, and Noblesville, Mattsville and Broad Ripple and subsidies had been voted along the line. Two years later Dr. Robert C. Light, of Broad Ripple, entertained similar plans and incorporated the Indianapolis and Logansport Traction Company. His plans included also an extension from Logansport to Warsaw. The Logansport and Kokomo Railway incorporated February 6, 1902, was for the purpose of building a Kokomo–Logansport line. George J. Marott purchased the Logansport city streetcar lines and decided to reach Indianapolis by connection with the Indianapolis Northern Traction Company line at Kokomo. This step provided terminal facilities and gave Marott an advantage in the approaching struggle with the Boyd line which was building from Wabash to Peru. After being excluded from High Street by the Logansport, Rochester & Northern Traction company who had laid its track over night, the Wabash River Traction company secured a restraining order against Marott enjoining the use of Erie avenue and Fifth street. A short time afterward the Boyd syndicate purchased Marott's holdings in Logansport and laid its tracks on Erie Avenue without interruption.

The work of completing the Logansport and Peru extensions from Kokomo was undertaken by the Union Traction Company during the summer of 1903. A regular schedule had been put in effect between Logansport and Kokomo on July 28, 1904. The line to Peru opened on August 14.

Soon after service began, Union Traction pooled its equipment with the Fort Wayne and Wabash Valley Traction Company to offer a one-seat ride from Indianapolis to Fort Wayne. The two cities had patchy and similarly indirect steam railroad services with which the interurbans could compete. Starting in 1910, some trips were run over the line by the Winona Interurban Railway, which had recently begun a service continuing along the Chicago, South Bend and Northern Indiana Railway as far north as South Bend. This was soon cut back to the Winona's northern terminus of Goshen. By 1918, the Cannon-Ball Express, a regular three-car interurban freight train, was being run over the line. This service furnished freight from as far away as Benton Harbor and its ferry connection to Chicago. The Fort Wayne service was improved after 1922, with two parlor cars running between 1926 and 1930. The Winona acquired light weight cars in 1924 which were intended to replace their heavy wooden cars, though the Union Traction Company did not approve of operating the new rolling stock over their line. As a result, the passenger service to Goshen was discontinued in 1926.

After coming under the ownership of Indiana Railroad, the Logansport line was discontinued on September 15, 1930, prior to the new company taking over operations. Cars continued to run from Indianapolis to Peru and on the Indiana Service Corporation line to Fort Wayne. Plans to modernize the line at this time were scuttled as a result of the Great Depression. Union Traction acquired the railroad post office contract between Indianapolis and Peru in 1935. Passenger service was replaced by buses on September 6, 1938. Freight service lasted until September 11. The company used this line's discontinuance as a chance to attempt rail replacement bus service instead of simple abandonment, which had been the case in previous instances.

== Rolling stock ==
Indiana Service Corporation cars 390 Little Turtle and 391 Anthony Wayne operated as parlor-diner cars on the line until December 1930. When Indiana Railroad took over in 1930, it assigned the 90-series rolling stock to the line. These cars were built new by Cummings Car and Coach Company. Speeds of the new stock were sufficient to withdraw the parlor cars.
