= Sullivan Line (railway) =

Railway line in Indiana, United States

The Sullivan Line was an interurban railway line in Indiana. It connected Sullivan to the state's western hub of Terre Haute. The line operated between 1906 and 1931.

== History ==
In 1905, a bitter fight was waged for possession of the south side interurban entrance to Terre Haute. The Stone–Webster syndicate of the Terre Haute Traction and Light Company secured right-of-ways and franchises and in the spring of 1906 began work on a line to Sullivan. By the end of April, cars were operating to Shelburn, six miles (9.7 km) north of the planned terminus. In June, the line was completed to Sullivan. Fares out of Terre Haute started at 10¢, (Note: equivalent to $3.583 in 2025 adjusted for inflation) going up to 50¢ (Note: equivalent to $17.917 in 2025 adjusted for inflation) for the full trip with no local transfers given.

In 1908, the Terre Haute, Indianapolis and Eastern Traction Company, the lessee of the Sullivan Line, proposed a six-mile (9.7 km) spur from Shelburn to Hymera; an extension to Linton was also considered, but most of all, the company wanted to extend the line to Vincennes and southward to meet the Southern Indiana Gas and Electric Company line that ran from Evansville to Patoka. Because of inability to finance the project, the gap was never closed.

Service along the line ceased after May 30, 1931.

== Route ==
The line was constructed on private right of way 50 feet (15 m) wide for the entire distance, with the exception of portions in the towns. For the greater portion of the distance, it paralleled the tracks of the Evansville and Terre Haute Railroad, which had previously been the only method of rail transportation in the area.

The track of the electric line was laid with 70-pound-per-yard (35 kg/m) rails, each 30 feet (9.1 m) long, fastened together with Weber rail joints. The ties were of chestnut and the road was ballasted with gravel. With the exception of one grade of 2%, there were no grades of consequence on the line. The curves were of long radii, and there were very few that did not permit the cars to be operated around them at full speed. Other than at one place near the city limits of Terre Haute, no excessive grading was encountered.
