= Paris–Terre Haute Line =

The Paris–Terre Haute Line was an interurban railway line in Indiana and Illinois. Parts of the service began in 1902 and the final connection of its two terminal cities of Terre Haute, Indiana, and Paris, Illinois, was completed in 1907. It operated until 1932.

== History ==
The Stone-Webster syndicate of Boston, which owned the Terre Haute Electric Traction company, laid a track from Terre Haute to West Terre Haute (Macksville) during the night of December 1, 1902, immediately after the city council had granted a franchise to the company. The cause of the hasty action was a desire to forestall a rival group from the use of the streets for a different Terre Haute to Paris, Illinois, line. The line was extended to St. Mary's by 1905. On January 7, 1907, the Terre Haute & Western Railway company was incorporated in Illinois to build from Sandford, Indiana, to Paris, Illinois, a distance of 10.5 miles (16.9 km). The Terre Haute to Sanford section was built by the Terre Haute Traction & Light Company in the same year and began service in October. By the terms of a 999-year lease dated November 15, 1907, the Terre Haute Traction & Light Company agreed to operate the entire line from Terre Haute to Paris, pay all taxes, bond interest, preferred and common dividends, maintain property, and pay $500 annually for organization expenses. The line was actually operated by the Terre Haute, Indianapolis and Eastern Traction Company, which leased the Terre Haute Traction & Light Company.

Concepts for a new line connecting Paris to the Illinois Traction System at Ridge Farm in 1928 would prove infeasible. The line was operated by the Indiana Railroad for a time after consolidation in 1931, but service was discontinued in January 1932.

== Infrastructure ==
The line's electrical substation was located at Vermilion, Illinois. The nominal grade on the route was 1/2% except for a short segment at 2.5%. At fills, the track center line was offset by two feet (0.61 m) to make space for easy maintenance of pole foundations. The line was fully grade-separated from steam railroads, crossing under the Vandalia Railroad and elevated over the Big Four tracks.

Significant freight interchange on the line was stymied by the city of Terre Haute, which did not allow freight traffic on its streets.
