= Ben Hur Route =

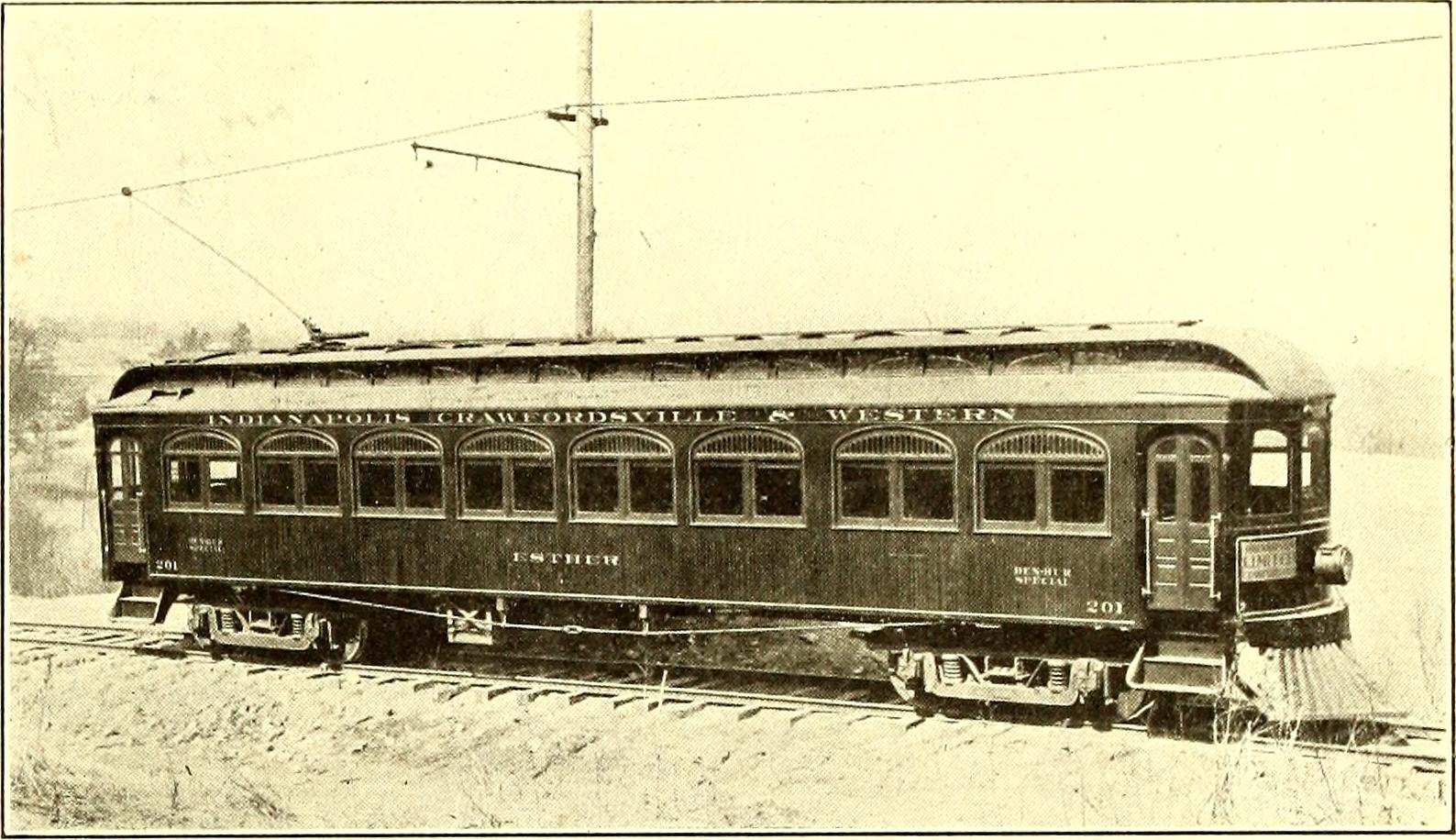
- Limited car number 201, Esther, signed for the Indianapolis, Crawfordsville and Western Traction Company

Overview
- Other name: Crawfordsville–Indianapolis
- Locale: Indiana
- Termini: Indianapolis Traction Terminal; Crawfordsville

Service
- System: Terre Haute, Indianapolis and Eastern Traction Company

History
- Opened: July 7, 1907
- Closed: October 31, 1930

Technical
- Line length: 45.1 mi (72.6 km)
- Character: Interurban
- Track gauge: 1,435 mm (4 ft 8 1/2 in) standard gauge

The Ben Hur Route was an interurban railway line which ran 45 miles (72 km) between Indianapolis and Crawfordsville, Indiana. Founders of the railway company named the line after the novel Ben-Hur: A Tale of the Christ, whose author, Lew Wallace, resided in Crawfordsville.

== Route ==
In Indianapolis, starting at the Traction Terminal, the line ran on city streets along Capitol and then Washington Street to cross the White River. It turned north from the Danville Line to run adjacent to the river until Michigan Street, where it ran west to the Cleveland, Cincinnati, Chicago and St. Louis Railway (Big Four) Peoria division. It left city tracks and briefly ran on Holmes and Walnut before starting to parallel the steam line to Crawfordsville.

There were no curves on the private right of way sharper than 3 degrees and 30 minutes and the maximum grade was one percent.

=== Unbuilt connection to Illinois ===
The Crawfordsville to Danville, Illinois gap was the only unfinished part of a fully electric St. Louis to Buffalo route. If built, it would have given both Indiana and Illinois lines access to heavy traffic which was then carried by the Big Four. Some attempts were made to fill the gap as late as 1912, though this connection would go unrealized.

== History ==
The originating Indianapolis, Crawford and Western Traction Company established service between Crawfordsville and Indianapolis on July 7, 1907. In its early years, students from the then-new Purdue University electrical engineering program carried out tests on the railroad's equipment.

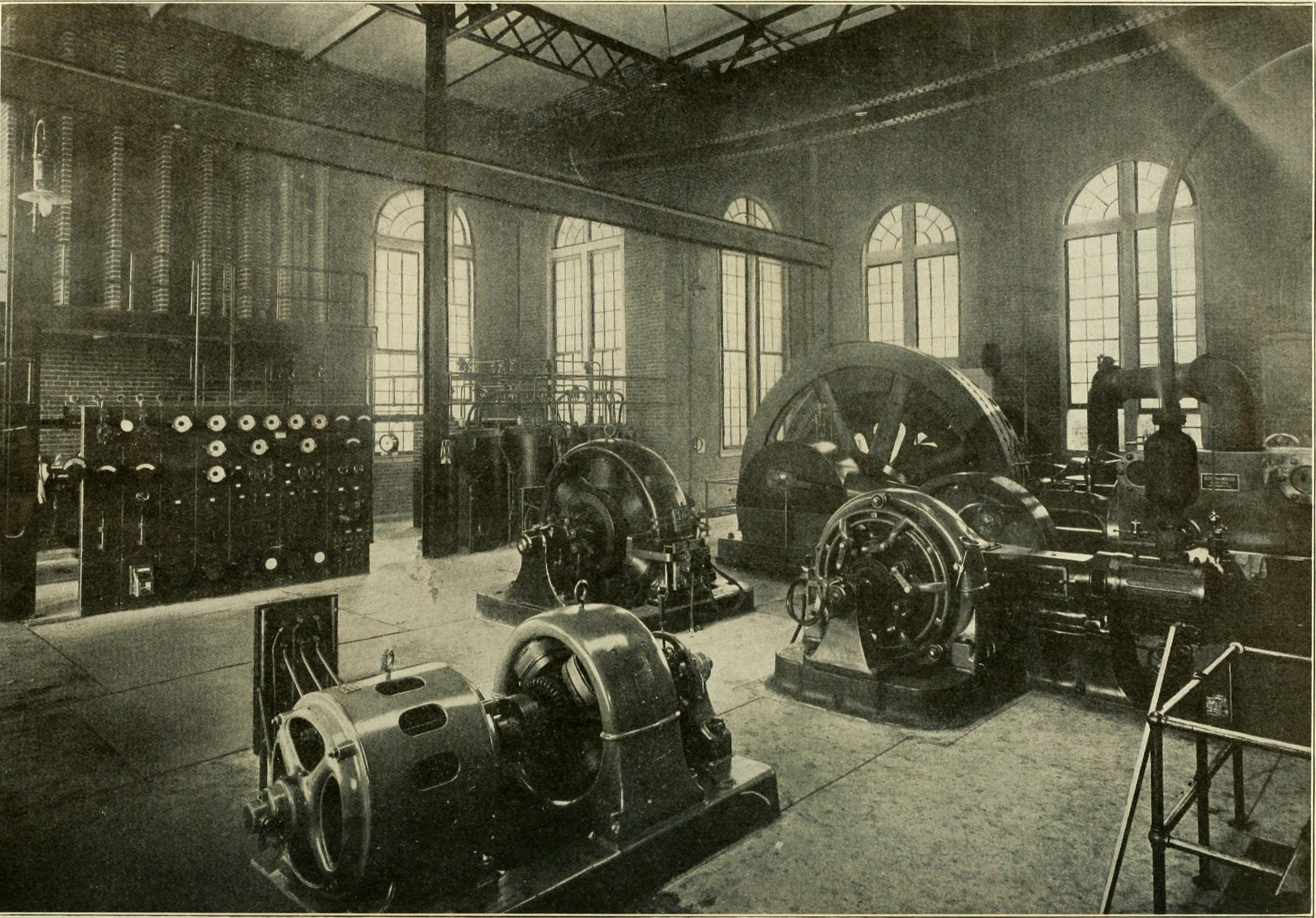
Electrical equipment used in the Crawfordsville power house, 1908

Early plans to extend the line to Covington and Danville, Illinois would go unrealized. The Indianapolis, Crawford and Western Traction Company declared bankruptcy in 1912 and was sold at foreclosure to the Indianapolis, Crawford and Danville Electric Railway Company, which later leased the line to the Terre Haute, Indianapolis and Eastern Traction Company (THI&E) under a 999-year contract.

The THI&E continued to operate the line, running the limited Ben Hur Special that made the full run between terminals in 1 hour 15 minutes. Passenger operations to Crawfordsville ceased after October 31, 1930.
