= Indianapolis and Cincinnati Traction Company =

The Indianapolis and Cincinnati Traction Company was an interurban railway company in Indiana. It built lines to the southeast of Indianapolis; the company's two branches would reach Connersville and Greensburg over 116-route miles (187 km) of track. A long planned connection to the company's second namesake city of Cincinnati, Ohio would go unrealized.

== History ==
Charles L. Henry of Anderson obtained a franchise during the summer and fall of 1902 for a line through Morristown, New Palestine to Rushville. It was said to be part of a scheme to connect Cincinnati and Chicago. Mr. Henry, president of the organization, incorporated The Indianapolis and Cincinnati Traction Company on February 4, 1903. After building the Indianapolis to Rushville section the line was to be extended to Hamilton, Ohio, and there connect with a Cincinnati line. The entire right-of-way from Indianapolis to Hamilton was secured and the contract for the southern end let. Effort was concentrated on the Indianapolis to Rushville section, however, and on February 20, 1905, the track was opened on an irregular schedule.

The company acquired the Indianapolis, Shelbyville and Southern Traction Company in 1903 — the company had recently built a line from Indianapolis to Shelbyville and Charles L. Henry purchased the company to prevent any competition for a potential Cincinnati connection. The Indianapolis and Cincinnati would go on to extend this line to Greensburg.

Before the road had been completed to Connersville, the directors of the company petitioned for a receiver, averring that the Rushville and Shelbyville divisions were showing gratifying increases in revenues, but, in order to meet damage suits and costs of the extension, it was necessary to convert the bond issue into preferred stock or second mortgage bonds, thereby making them more readily sold. Upon a request of the petitioners, Mr. Henry was appointed receiver, July 3, 1906.

After more than four years of effort Receiver Henry filed a report in August 1910 stating that reorganization had failed. Accordingly, November 10, 1910, the road was offered for sale and was purchased by John J. Appel for the investors at the upset price of $1,045,000.11. (Note: $3.53 million in 2024 adjusted for inflation) The bond holders, who were the owners of the bankrupt line, organized the Indianapolis and Cincinnati Traction Company.

The company reorganized as the Indianapolis and Southeastern Railroad in 1929. The rail lines ceased operation in January 1932.

== Electrification ==
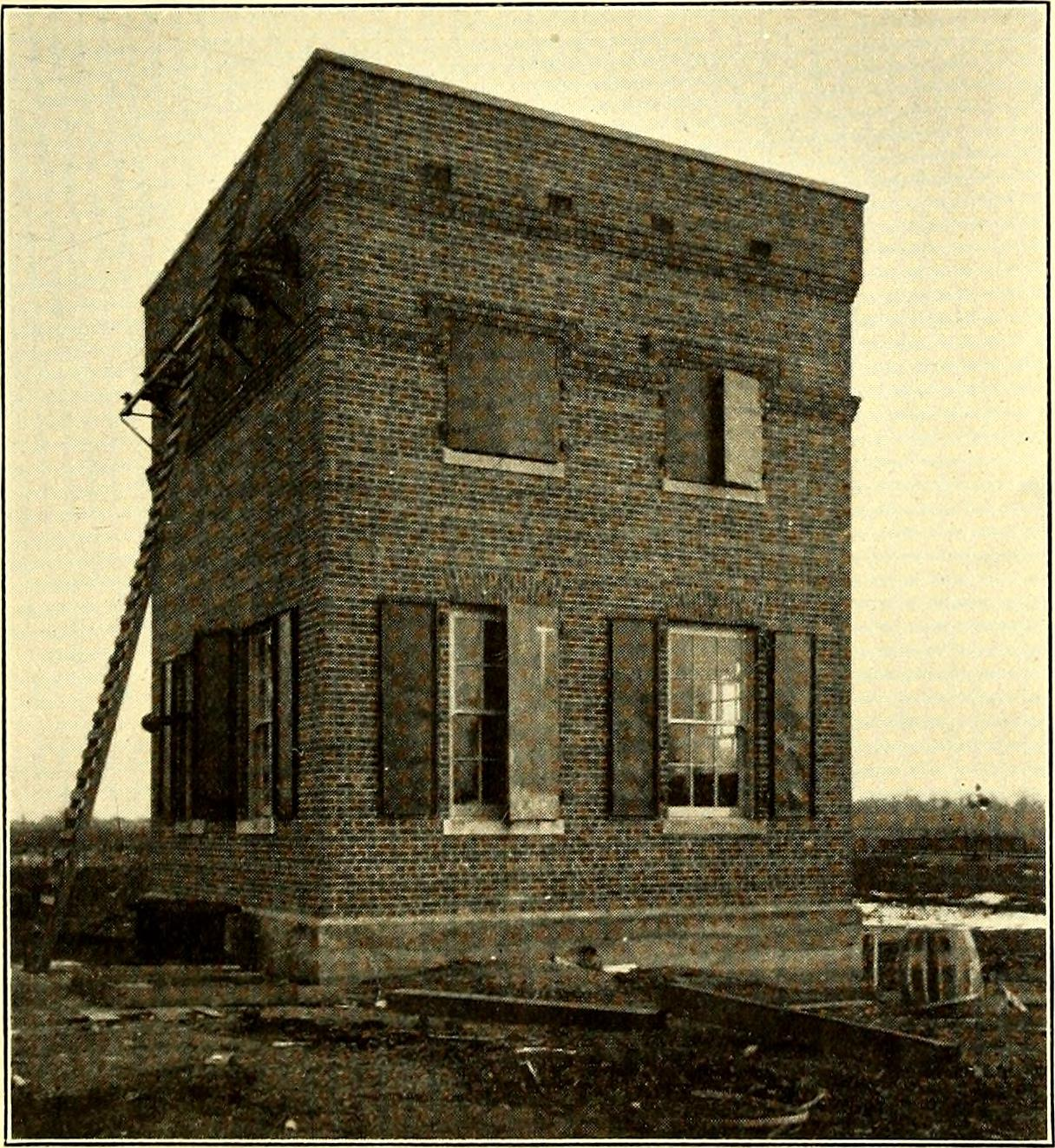
Transformer station at Reedville

The company's lines were built with an electrification system based on the use of Westinghouse alternating current generators, advertised as the first put in to use for commercial operation. This was intended to allow the entire system to be powered from a single location without the use of electrical substations. The 3,300 volt alternating current differed greatly from the conventional 600 V DC trolley installations used in most major cities, including Indianapolis. During construction, it was also found inadvisable to run high voltage alternating current lines near Rushville, so a normal 600 V DC system was additionally installed there. Cars were equipped with multi-mode motors, capable of running on both systems. The system would prove unwieldy and expensive. It was replaced with a conventional 600 volt system between 1923 and 1924.

== Services ==
- Connersville Line
- Greensburg Line
