= Danville Line =

Overview
- Locale: Indiana
- Termini: Indianapolis Traction Terminal; Danville station

Service
- System: Terre Haute, Indianapolis and Eastern Traction Company

History
- Opened: September 1, 1905
- Closed: October 31, 1930

Technical
- Character: Interurban
- Track gauge: 1,435 mm (4 ft 8 1/2 in) standard gauge

The Danville Line was an interurban railway line in Indiana. It ran between its namesake city, Danville, and the state capitol of Indianapolis.

Some earlier schemes had been advanced for an electric railway between Indianapolis and Danville but little progress had been made until the Indianapolis, Danville and Rockville Traction Company was incorporated in 1903 with a plan to build to Bainbridge and Rockville. Work on the 20-mile (32 km) line between Avon and Danville began that year. Most of the line had been graded by March 1904. A Philadelphia-based syndicate acquired a controlling interest in the unfinished line in the summer of 1905 and pushed the construction to completion. There was a delay in securing material and labor, so that it was September 1, 1905, before regular service was inaugurated between Danville and Avon.

The first car was run through from Danville to Indianapolis on August 30, 1906. By the following summer, the line was hosting a daily freight run and fourteen passenger cars running hourly operation after the substation at Avon had been installed.

Operations were consolidated with other interurban railways as the Terre Haute, Indianapolis and Eastern Traction Company. Some attempts to connect the east end to the Terre Haute line at Amo were made with incentives to towns in 1912, but this extension was never built. The line was rarely profitable, with the application for abandonment noting that recent years had been profitable only in 1920, 1921, and 1927. Service along the line was abandoned along with several other Terre Haute, Indianapolis and Eastern Traction Company routes on October 31, 1930.
