= Indiana Railroad =

Indiana Railroad Interurban

Overview
- Headquarters: Indianapolis, Indiana
- Locale: Indiana
- Dates of operation: 1930–1941

Technical
- Track gauge: 4 ft 8 1/2 in (1,435 mm) standard gauge
- Electrification: (?)

The Indiana Railroad (IR) was one of the last of the typical Midwestern United States interurban lines. It was formed in 1930–31 by combining the operations of the five major interurban systems in central Indiana into one entity. The predecessor companies came under the control of Midland Utilities, owned by Samuel Insull. His plan was to modernize the profitable routes and abandon the unprofitable ones. With the onset of the Great Depression, the Insull empire collapsed and the Indiana Railroad was left with a decaying infrastructure and little hope of overcoming the growing competition of the automobile for passenger business and the truck for freight business. The IR faced bankruptcy in 1933, and Bowman Elder was designated as the receiver to run the company. Payments on bonded debt were suspended. Elder was able to keep the system virtually intact for four years, and IR operated about 600 miles (970 km) of interurban lines throughout Indiana during this period. During the late 1930s, the routes were abandoned one by one until a 1941 wreck with fatalities south of Indianapolis put an abrupt end to the Indiana Railroad's last passenger operations.

== Predecessor interurban companies ==
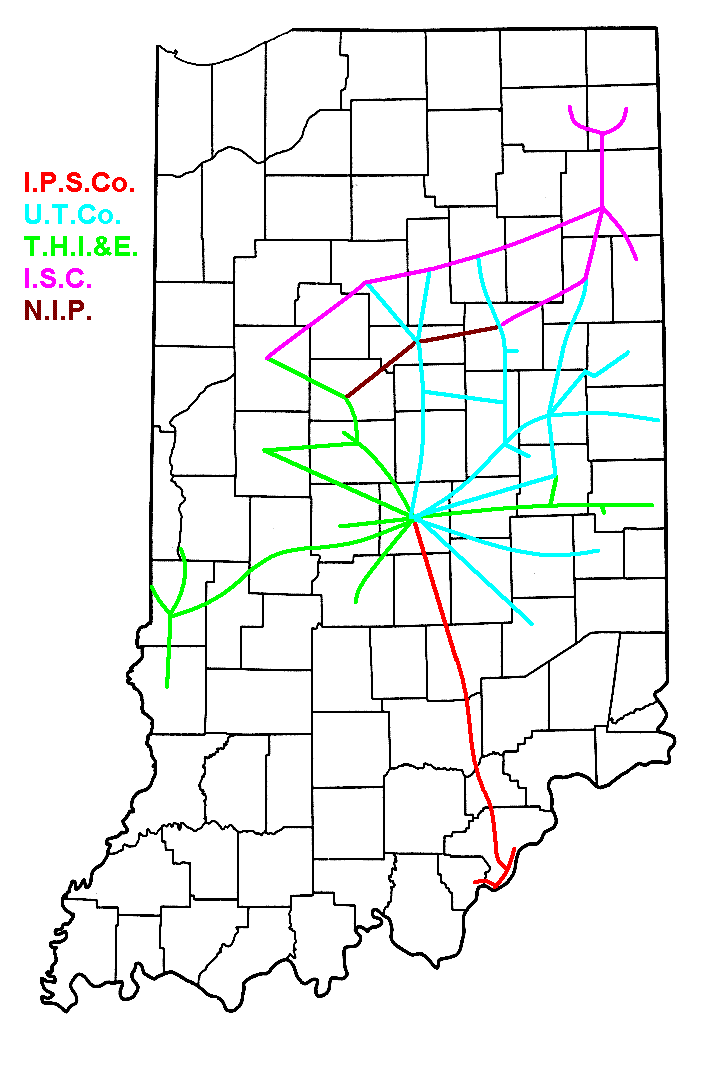
Map of the Indiana Railroad showing predecessor lines.

The late 1890s was a time of horse-drawn carriages and wagons pulled along unpaved streets and roads, so the arrival of the town streetcar was appreciated. Some of these trolley lines eventually expanded into the countryside and, by 1911, had grown into hundreds of miles of interurban lines networked across Indiana. "When before we had moved by horse and carriage, we now rode on plush seats to places 20 miles (32 km), 30 miles (48 km), even 50 miles (80 km) distant."

=== Union Traction Company ===
The Indiana Railroad was created on July 2, 1930, when Midland Utilities purchased the Union Traction Company of Indiana (UTC) and transferred ownership to the IR. Union Traction (UTC) was the largest interurban system in Indiana with 410 miles (660 km) of interurban trackage and 44 miles (71 km) of streetcar lines in Anderson, Elwood, Marion and Muncie. UTC had been created in 1897 to operate an initial line between Anderson and Alexandria, and came under the control of the Schoepf-McGowan Syndicate in 1902. UTC purchased or leased several neighboring interurban lines in short order: the Elwood and Alexandria was bought in 1903, the Indiana Northern in 1905, and the Indiana Muncie Hartford and Fort Wayne was leased in 1906. In 1906, UTC also purchased all of the Dayton and Muncie's trackage in Indiana.

UTC absorbed the Indianapolis, New Castle, and Toledo in 1912 and extended its trackage from New Castle to Muncie, but it did not reach Toledo. Although it attempted a passenger revival with the purchase of new equipment, UTC went into decline in the 1920s along with the other Indiana interurban systems. In 1925, it entered receivership whereby it continued operating by delaying paying interest on its bonded debt. It survived this bankruptcy whole and passed intact into IR control in 1930.

=== Interstate Public Service ===
At the same time that UTC was acquired, three other systems already owned by Midland Utilities were put under the control of IR. The largest was the Interstate Public Service Company (IPS), which was reorganized as an independent company known as Public Service Company of Indiana, but was operated under the auspices of IR. The IPS operated the line from Indianapolis to Louisville that had been built between 1896 and 1907 under a variety of small independent lines. Through service between Indianapolis and Louisville was inaugurated over these separate lines in 1908, but it was not until 1912 that ownership of the different segments was consolidated and IPS was created.

During the 1920s, IPS modernized its fleet of cars extensively. It operated frequent passenger services between Indianapolis and Louisville and operated suburban services around Louisville. By 1930, it was one of the strongest of the Indiana interurban lines. IPS operated three-car overnight sleeper trains each way between Indianapolis and Louisville during the years before the Great Depression. The all-steel interurban sleeper cars, with traction controls and motors removed, were purchased and used into the 1960s by British Columbia Railway.

=== Indiana Service Corporation ===
The Indiana Service Corporation (ISC) became part of IR at the same time as the IPS. ISC was the successor to the Fort Wayne and Wabash Valley Traction Company (FW&WV), a system that had been assembled from smaller predecessors around 1902.

In 1910, FW&WV had a very bad wreck near Kingsland, Indiana. Two wood bodied cars impacted head on, with one "telescoping" into the other, resulting in 41 fatalities. This is considered the worst accident in the history of interurban transit and forced the FW&WV into bankruptcy.

FW&WV reorganized as the Fort Wayne and Northern Indiana, but failed in 1919 and was purchased by ISC. ISC had also acquired two other lines, the Fort Wayne and Northwestern and the Marion and Bluffton Traction Company, in 1924 and 1926, respectively. In the 1920s, IPS purchased a group of heavy steel combines and coaches (class 400) from St. Louis Car Company. ISC was absorbed into IR essentially intact, with only the Battle Ground branch having been previously abandoned. The 400 class ISC cars were operated by Indiana Railroad along with IR's new high speed cars until abandonment. One of the combines was eventually purchased by the CSS&SB South Shore Line, where it still operates today as a catenary maintenance car.

=== Northern Indiana Power ===
Absorbed into IR along with ISC and IPS was the Northern Indiana Power Company, a successor to the Kokomo Marion and Western Traction Company. This line was the smallest and weakest of the companies that were folded into IR.

=== Terre Haute Indianapolis and Eastern ===
A year later, on June 23, 1931, the final piece of the IR system was added when the Terre Haute Indianapolis and Eastern (THI&E) was purchased at auction. The THI&E was the second-largest interurban system in Indiana, operating just over 400 miles (640 km) of interurban lines as well as streetcar service in several western Indiana cities. It operated branches out of Indianapolis west to Terre Haute and Brazil, to the university town of Lafayette, and east to Richmond. It stretched nearly from the eastern to the western boundaries of the state. Due to lack of operating revenue and funds, it had never modernized, and was financially among the weakest of the Indiana lines. As a power utility it had profits, but the interurban division had been losing money for a decade. It fell into receivership (a form of bankruptcy where the company continues to operate but does not pay interest on its bonded debt) in 1930, and several major branches, including lines to Danville, Martinsville, Lafayette, Crawfordsville, Sullivan, and Clinton were abandoned prior to absorption by IR in 1931. Its Indianapolis–Richmond Line connecting with the Dayton and Western Traction Company was an important IR link to the Ohio interurbans for interchange of freight. IR quickly retired the very dated THI&E arch-windowed wood combines.

=== The essential Dayton and Western connection ===
The Indiana Railroad was able to interchange passengers and considerable freight with the Cincinnati and Lake Erie interurban in Ohio, but the financially very weak Dayton and Western interurban was the essential rail link between the two companies. The 53-mile (85 km) D&W tied into IR tracks at its west end at Richmond, Indiana, and into C&LE tracks at its eastern end at Dayton, Ohio. The D&W connection allowed the IR to ship freight from Indiana to Dayton, and from there on the C&LE north to Toledo and Cleveland, south to Cincinnati, and east to Columbus. Like many interurbans, the Dayton and Western struggled financially into the 1930s. Its track ran adjacent to the new U.S. Route 40 highway between Richmond and Dayton, and as the 1920s passed, the Dayton and Western crews apprehensively watched as more and more of their business moved onto that highway in the form of cars, trucks, and buses. From 1931 to 1933, the Cincinnati & Lake Erie leased the D&W to prop it up. In 1936, the IR took over the lease, but in May 1937 it had to drop the lease for lack of funds, forcing the D&W to abandon operations. The resulting loss of revenue business to Ohio wounded the IR.

== Inherited rolling stock ==
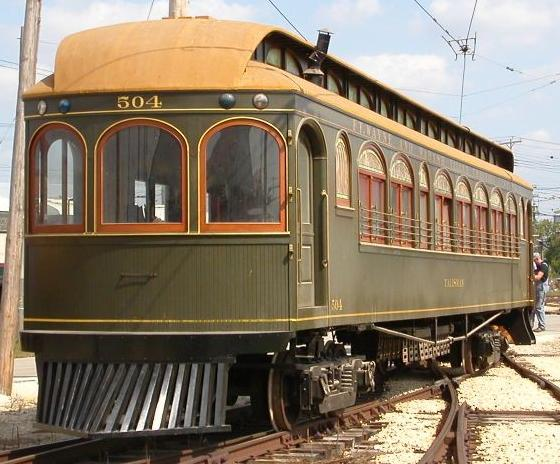
This Fort Wayne & Wabash Valley all wood heavy interurban is typical of the numerous pre-1910 wood combines which were inherited by IR.

IR inherited a large fleet of interurban cars from its various predecessor companies, totaling perhaps 100–150 interurban cars (of which about 60 were retained), probably 200 or so streetcars (of which about 150 were retained), around 50 pieces of freight equipment and about 55 work cars of various types.

The interurban cars varied considerably in age and design. A number of pre-1910 very large arch-windowed wooden combines that had survived in service on ISC and THI&E were disposed of within the first couple of years of IR's existence, leaving a fleet made up predominantly of heavy steel single-ended combines. There were about half a dozen 400 class ISC combines, 30 UTC steel combines (including 15 modern cars only five years old), and nine of Interstate IPS's heavyweight combines, parlor, and sleeping cars. A few of these former Interstate cars were still operated by a British Columbia railroad in the 1990s.

The city cars, excluding earlier wooden types that were scrapped, consisted mainly of single-truck Birney cars inherited from UTC and THI&E. The only exceptions were a handful of double-truck cars left over from UTC and from IPS's suburban Louisville operations.

The freight and work equipment was a hodgepodge of mainly home-built designs, outdated passenger cars converted for alternate use, and secondhand equipment. Most of this equipment was quite old, but even some equipment dating to before 1905 remained in IR's employ for years. Some of the retired passenger coaches that were in better condition were rebuilt into box motors and utility cars.

== New rolling stock ==
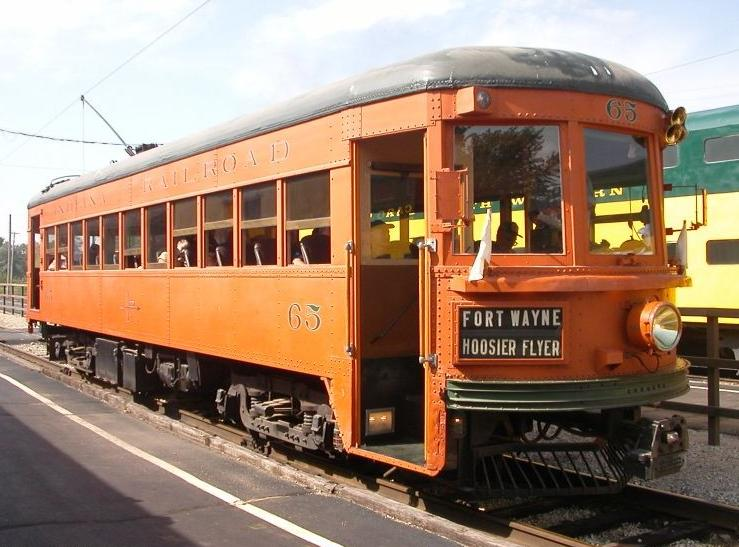
Car number 65, now preserved at the Illinois Railway Museum, was built for IR by Pullman in 1931.

IR purchased two series of modern interurban cars during its life, and it was the first series — the famed Indiana Railroad High-Speeds — that always symbolized the railroad. When IR was created, its owners knew that they would have to modernize their fleet of interurban cars if they hoped to prevent further erosion of their ridership. In 1930 and 1931, IR designed a series of lightweight, low center of gravity, high-speed interurban cars that could operate quickly and economically on the far-flung IR network. The new cars owed much to the Cincinnati and Lake Erie lightweight cars built a year before. They were single-ended, low-floor cars designed for operation by a single man and were built largely of aluminum to save weight and, therefore, require less power to operate. The biggest difference from the C&LE cars was in the trucks: whereas the C&LE cars had smaller arch-bar trucks, the IR cars were designed with heavy Commonwealth cast steel trucks designed specifically for high-speed service and to cope with poor light rail track.

A total of 35 cars was ordered. The first 14, cars 50–63, came from the American Car and Foundry and were deluxe cars with coach seating at the front and parlor car chairs at the back. The remaining 21 cars, numbered 64–84, came from Pullman and had all coach seating with a small baggage section at the rear. Delivery of the new high-speeds began in July 1931 and they were an immediate success, making it possible for IR to reduce running times on some of its routes and economize on its operations.

The second series of new cars was a group of ten Cummings-built lightweight cars that were bought in 1935. They were not brand new; they had been constructed in 1930 for the Northern Indiana Railway but had been seized by Cummings when the Northern Indiana couldn't pay for them. These cars were numbered 90–99.

== Freight operation ==
Although considerable planning and expenditure in 1930 went into improving the passenger operation, IR hoped to increase revenue from its freight business. Overnight less-than-carload (LCL) deliveries between the various IR-linked towns (and to or from Ohio) were not available from the competing railroads; the latter typically required two to three days to complete a shipment. An example is delivering machined parts made in Terre Haute overnight to Auburn, Indiana, auto manufacturer Auburn.

Prior to 1930, cartage business already existed due to the interurban's ties to local power companies. At night the IR's arch windowed wood bodied box motors would tow one or two gondolas loaded with coal for the local power plant through the streets of towns. In some cases, freight trains operating on city streets faced objections from town councils, particularly if those trains operated during the day. Many merchants, newspapers, and small manufacturing companies used the frequent interurban scheduling provided. Had an improving economy allowed this freight business to increase, the IR would have had a promising future. Instead, it collapsed further. When the Indiana Railroad lost its important freight interchange connection with neighboring interurban Dayton and Western, prospects for the line's survival were poor. The IR continued to barely survive with only the Indiana freight business, but its lines were abandoned one by one.

Today, one operation on IR track survives as a branch of the Louisville and Indiana Railroad from its former Pennsylvania Railroad line south from Indianapolis to Louisville, Kentucky. The L&I purchased the line in 2022 between Speed, Indiana and Watson Junction from the Southern Indiana Railroad, the last true IR line. This branch, using diesel power, handles concrete from Essroc Cement in Speed for interchange with the CSX at Watson on the former Baltimore and Ohio Railroad line running northeast from Louisville.

== Decline ==
In its startup years just before the beginning of the Great Depression, the Indiana Railroad obtained funds for improving its physical plant and purchasing new interurban coaches and freight equipment by selling corporate stock and bonds. Interest was to be paid on the bonds semi-annually from operating income, but the company's operating income declined and eventually became inadequate to repay the bond interest. This forced an eventual declaration of bankruptcy. The public's desire to travel by interurban diminished as the Depression deepened and as more roads were paved with more cars driven on them.

On July 28, 1933, IR went into bankruptcy but continued to operate. Control was placed by bankruptcy court into the hands of Bowman Elder as receiver. Elder was able to keep the system virtually intact for four more years with increasing income from freight. The IR was operating about 600 miles (970 km) of interurban lines throughout Indiana during this period. In 1936, IR actually showed an operating profit, the only time in its history that it did so. In that year, the IR brought the Dayton and Western under its control by leasing it for two years. This continued its valuable freight link to the Cincinnati and Lake Erie Ohio interurban which ran from Cincinnati through Dayton to Toledo and east to Cleveland using the Lake Shore Electric interurban. The IR and the C&LE moved much freight at the time to Cleveland. When the Lake Shore Electric was abandoned, severing the ability to ship to Cleveland, the C&LE soon stopped running too. Eventually, the IR did not have the funds to continue to lease the D&W. The lease was dropped, the D&W shut down, and the important freight connection was lost.

In 1937, the final slide into bankruptcy began. By order of the Securities and Exchange Commission, Midland Utilities was dissolved and the interurban lines it controlled were divorced from the subsidy income of their parent electric power generating company. In March 1937, the line abandonments began. The old Indiana Service Corporation ISC lines from Fort Wayne north to Waterloo, Garrett, and Kendallville were abandoned on March 15. On May 9, the former THI&E line east of Indianapolis to Richmond was abandoned, severing the IR's important connection with the C&LE interurban network in Ohio. In September 1938, the former Union Traction line from Indianapolis to Fort Wayne via Peru was abandoned, leaving the more southern Indianapolis to Ft Wayne via Muncie route intact. A year later, the major trunk of the former Interstate Public Service Indianapolis to Louisville line was cut back to Seymour. In January 1940, the former THI&E line west of Indianapolis to Brazil, Greencastle, and Terre Haute was abandoned. On January 18, 1941, the remaining Union Traction Indianapolis to Fort Wayne and Bluffton line and the Muncie to New Castle branch were abandoned. The final interurban service between Indianapolis and Seymour (truncated from the Louisville line) was discontinued on September 8.

== End of service ==
With the abandonment of its two principal remaining lines in January 1941, the IR was essentially gone. The name IR ceased to be used and the one remaining stub of serviceable trackage, between Indianapolis and Seymour along the old IPS route, continued to operate under the Public Service Company of Indiana name. This service was operated with just two of the high-speed cars (the balance were scrapped at the Anderson shops in 1941), running just one round-trip a day to fulfill franchise obligations. Even this fragment of interurban service did not last long. On September 8, 1941, one of the two high-speed cars still in use met the one remaining work car in a head-on collision at speed. The high-speed car had stalled, and the work car had been sent from Indianapolis to investigate. But the first car had recovered and proceeded, leading to a head-on collision and injured passengers and crew. The operator of the high-speed car eventually died, as did one of the passengers. The Indianapolis to Seymour service immediately ceased, and soon the track was removed. This was the end of the Indiana Railroad.

== Services ==
Route	Original company	Discontinued	Notes
Indianapolis–Seymour	Interstate Public Service	September 8, 1941	Seymour to Louisville segment abandoned in 1939
Indianapolis–Muncie–Ft. Wayne	Indiana Union Traction Company / Indiana Service Corporation	January 18, 1941	
Muncie–Newcastle	Indiana Union Traction Company	January 18, 1941	
Terre Haute–Indianapolis	Terre Haute, Indianapolis and Eastern Traction Company	January 11, 1940	
Indianapolis–Peru–Ft. Wayne	Indiana Union Traction Company / Indiana Service Corporation	September 11, 1938	Further information: Indianapolis–Logansport/Peru Line
Indianapolis–Newcastle	Indiana Union Traction Company	May 9, 1937	
Newcastle–Richmond	Terre Haute, Indianapolis and Eastern Traction Company	May 9, 1937	Indianapolis to Dunreith segment abandoned in 1932
Richmond–Dayton	Dayton and Western Traction Company	May 9, 1937	Operated under lease
Ft. Wayne–Waterloo / Kendallville	Indiana Service Corporation	March 15, 1937	
Marion–Frankfort	Northern Indiana Power	July 1, 1932	
Anderson–Marion	Indiana Union Traction Company	July 1, 1932	
Peru–Lafayette	Indiana Service Corporation	May 22, 1932	
Terre Haute–Paris	Terre Haute, Indianapolis and Eastern Traction Company	January 26, 1932	
Marion–Bluffton	Indiana Service Corporation	August 16, 1931	
Tipton–Alexandria	Indiana Union Traction Company	June 30, 1931	

== Surviving rolling stock ==
- 55, preserved operational at the Seashore Trolley Museum as Lehigh Valley Transit 1030
- 65, preserved operational at the Illinois Railway Museum
- 167 "Scottsburg," preserved at the West Coast Railway Association as Pacific Great Eastern "Clinton"
- 202, preserved at the Western Railway Museum as Portland Traction Company 4001
- 205, preserved at the Illinois Railway Museum
- 375, preserved in Scottsburg, Indiana as Chicago South Shore and South Bend 503
- 376, preserved at the Illinois Railway Museum as Chicago South Shore and South Bend 1100
- 377, preserved at the Illinois Railway Museum as Chicago South Shore and South Bend 504
- 429, preserved by the Hoosier Heartland Trolley Company as Union Traction 429
- 437, preserved by the Hoosier Heartland Trolley Company as Union Traction 437
- 715, preserved by a private owner in Ohio
- Several older interurban cars retired in the first years of IR have also been preserved.
- 128 is inside a house at 192 S. 7th Street in Austin Indiana.
