= Terre Haute, Indianapolis and Eastern Traction Company =

Electric railway in Indiana, US

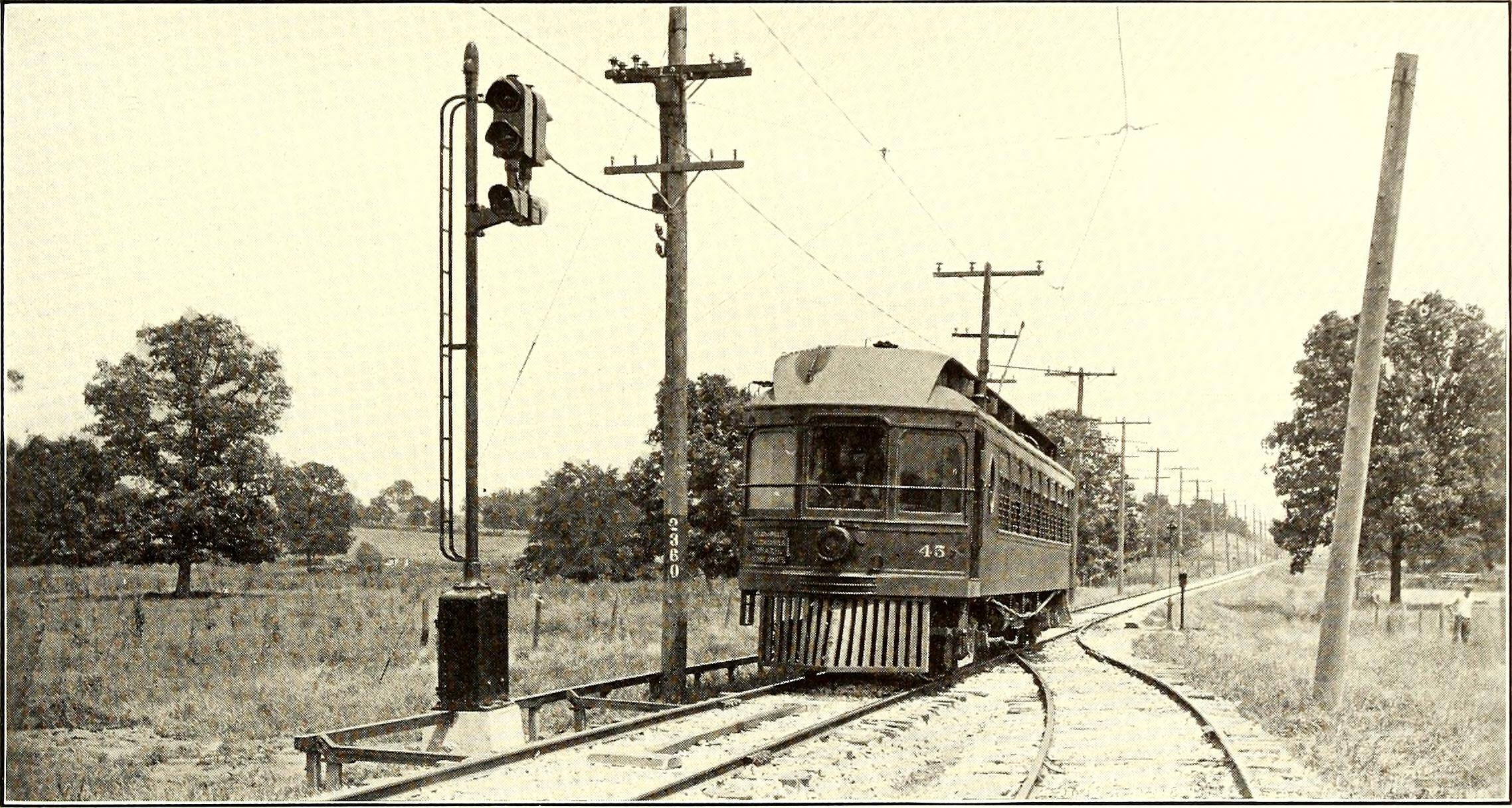
- Terre Haute, Indianapolis and Eastern Traction Company car navigating a switch, 1913

Overview
- Locale: Indiana
- Dates of operation: 1907; 118 years ago–1931; 94 years ago
- Successor: Indiana Railroad

Technical
- Track gauge: 4 ft 8 1/2 in (1,435 mm) standard gauge

The Terre Haute, Indianapolis and Eastern Traction Company, or THI&E, was the second largest interurban electric railway in the U.S. state of Indiana during the height of the 1920s "interurban era." This system included over 400 miles (640 km) of track, with lines radiating from Indianapolis to the east, northwest, west and southwest as well as streetcar lines in several major cities. The THI&E was formed in 1907 by the Schoepf-McGowan Syndicate as a combination of several predecessor interurban and street car companies and was operated independently until incorporation into the Indiana Railroad in 1931. The THI&E served a wide range of territory, including farmlands in central Indiana, the mining region around Brazil, and numerous urban centers. Eventually, it slowly succumbed like all the other central Indiana interurban lines, to competition from automobiles, trucks, and improved paralleling highways.

== Consolidation ==
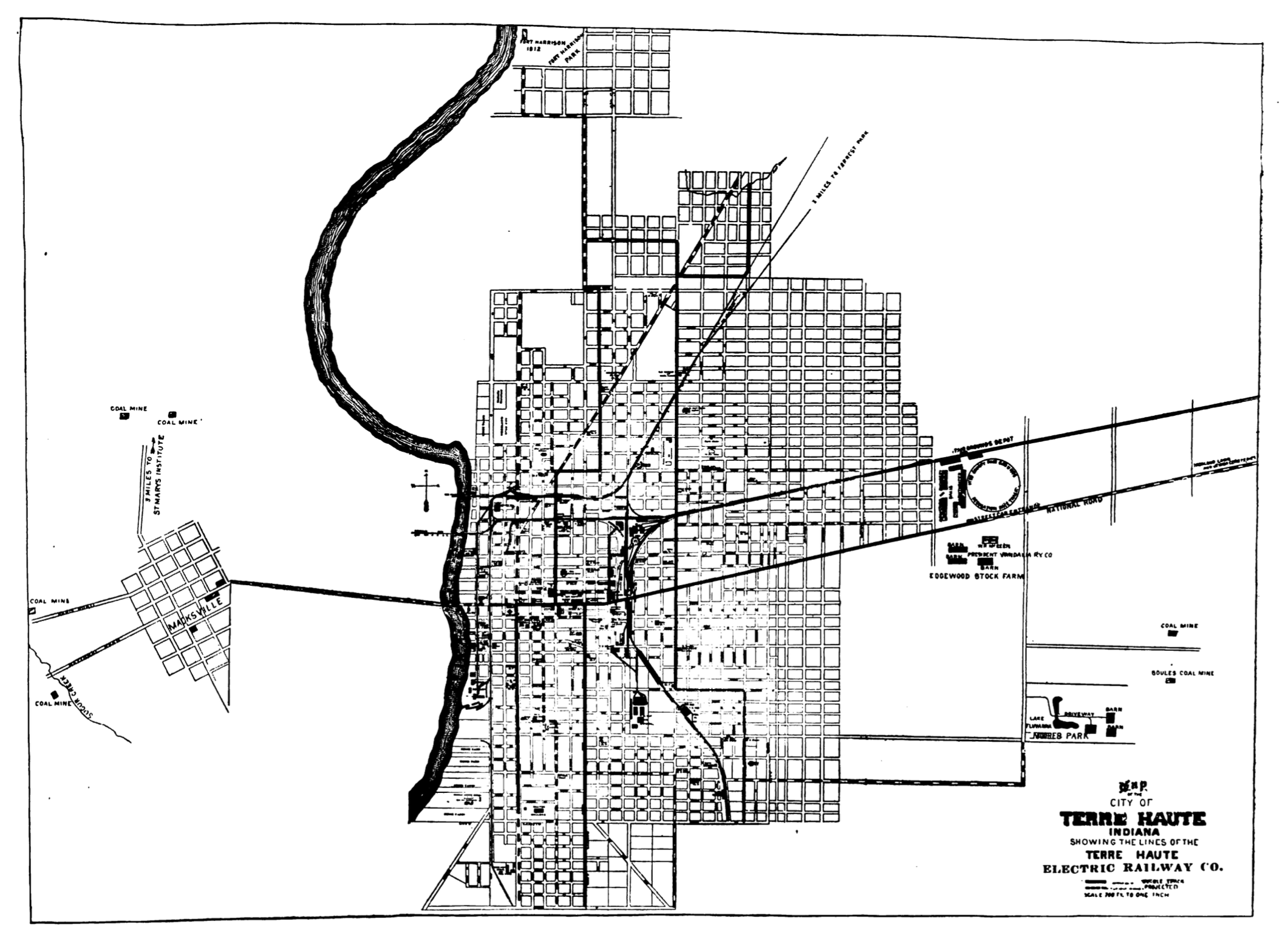
Terre Haute Electric Railway Company c. 1894

On March 1, 1907, financiers Hugh J. McGowan, Randal Morgan, and W. Kesley Schoepf formed the THI&E out of four predecessor companies: the Indianapolis and Western Railway, which operated the line from Indianapolis west to Danville; the Indianapolis and Eastern Railway, with lines from Indianapolis east to Dublin and from Dunreith to New Castle; the Richmond Street and Interurban Railway, with the line in eastern Indiana from Dublin to Richmond; and the Indianapolis Coal Traction Company. Three weeks later the THI&E acquired the Terre Haute Traction and Light Company, which operated a line from Terre Haute south to Sullivan, north to Clinton, Indiana, and west to Paris, Illinois. In April 1907, the Schoepf-McGowan Syndicate leased the Indianapolis and Northwestern Traction Company, a system of over 90 miles (140 km) with lines from Indianapolis to Lafayette and from Lebanon to Crawfordsville, and purchased the Indianapolis and Martinsville Rapid Transit Company, which ran between the cities in its name. The final major piece of the THI&E was the 1912 addition of the Indianapolis Crawfordsville and Danville Electric Railway, nicknamed the "Ben Hur Route" in honor of Lew Wallace of Crawfordsville, author of the novel Ben Hur. The THI&E system totaled over 400 miles (640 km) of track at this point and was the largest Indiana interurban. It also turned out to be one of the financially weakest due to its many unproductive branch lines.

== Operations ==
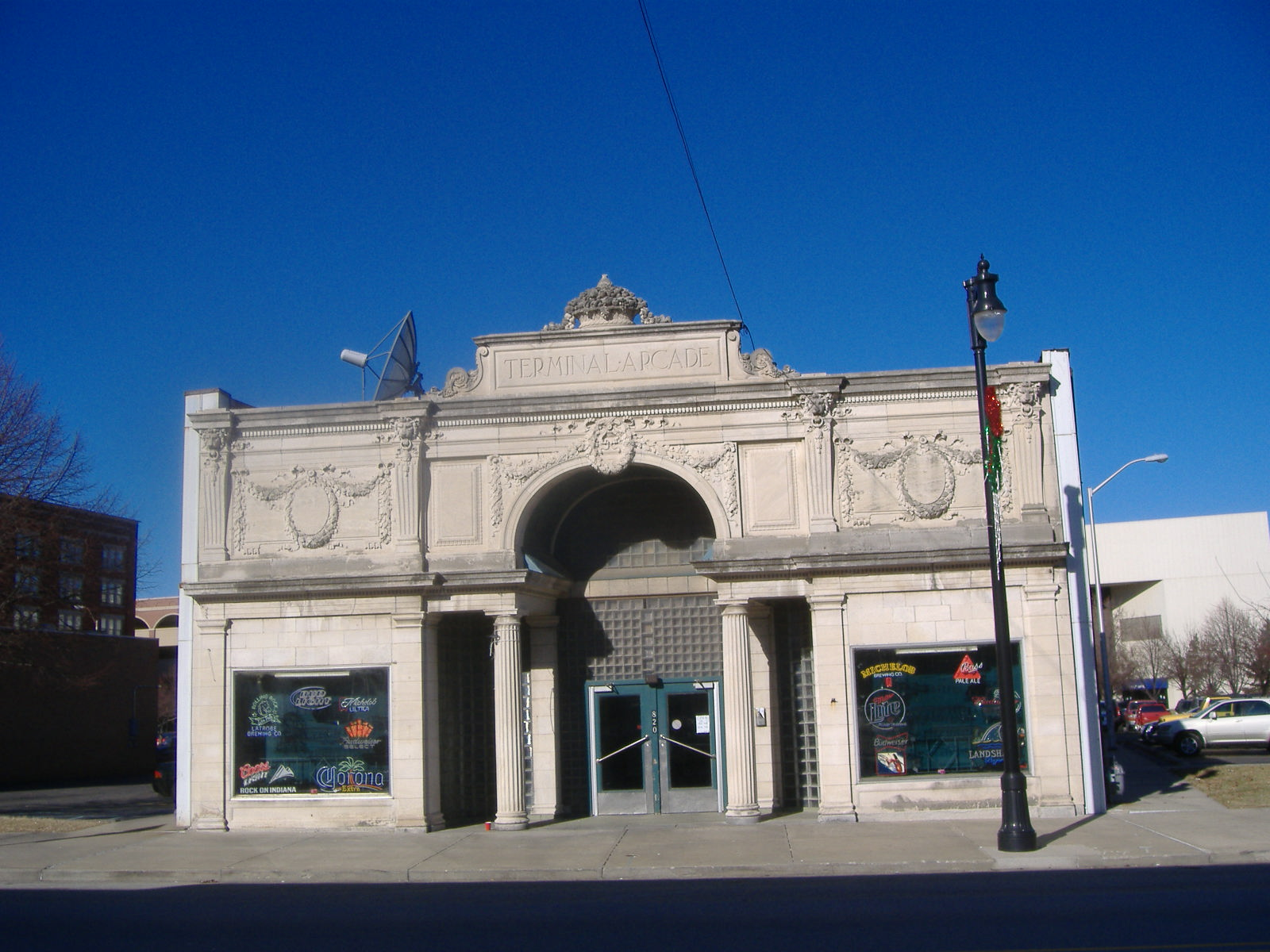
THI&E Terminal Arcade in Terre Haute, Indiana

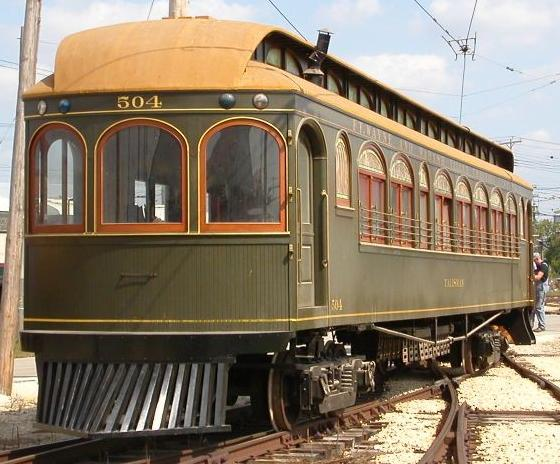
This car is typical of the numerous pre-1910 wood combines which were inherited by IR.

The THI&E was a typical Midwestern interurban electric railway line, operating six far-reaching lines out of Indianapolis to mostly small and midsized cities using large heavy wood combines (passenger and freight in one car) like the one pictured. Tracks and right-of-way quality varied. Some track ran tightly adjacent to a steam railroad; some track ran cross country and was very substantial, featuring expensive cut-and-fill construction to provide a direct and flat right of way; and some was along the side of country roads, going up and down with the road and the terrain and occasionally jogging from one side of the road to the other depending on how uncooperative a farmer had been when the line was constructed. The THI&E's busier lines had color signal block protection, which was rare at the time. Many interurbans, including the other major Indiana interurbans and in particular Union Traction, suffered major wrecks as the result of few or no block signals.

Most THI&E passenger service was hourly, and main routes also saw package express service. THI&E's limited stop express to Terre Haute from Indianapolis was named the "Highlander." The "Ben Hur Special" ran to Crawfordsville, and the "Tecumseh Arrow" ran to Lafayette. Eventually its most valuable route in terms of both passenger and freight business was its eastward line to Richmond; that line connected to the Dayton and Western at Richmond and the two companies combined for a profitable and busy Indianapolis to Dayton service. In the 1920s, the two ran express passenger service between the two large cities, and the freight interchanged from Ohio interurbans by way of the Dayton and Western became financially very important. The THI&E was never prosperous enough to replace its aging fleet of wood interurban cars, but many were modernized. Much of the THI&E's various town streetcar lines were eventually equipped with new one-man Birney streetcars. The THI&E used the Indianapolis Traction Terminal along with other Indianapolis interurban companies.

=== Routes ===
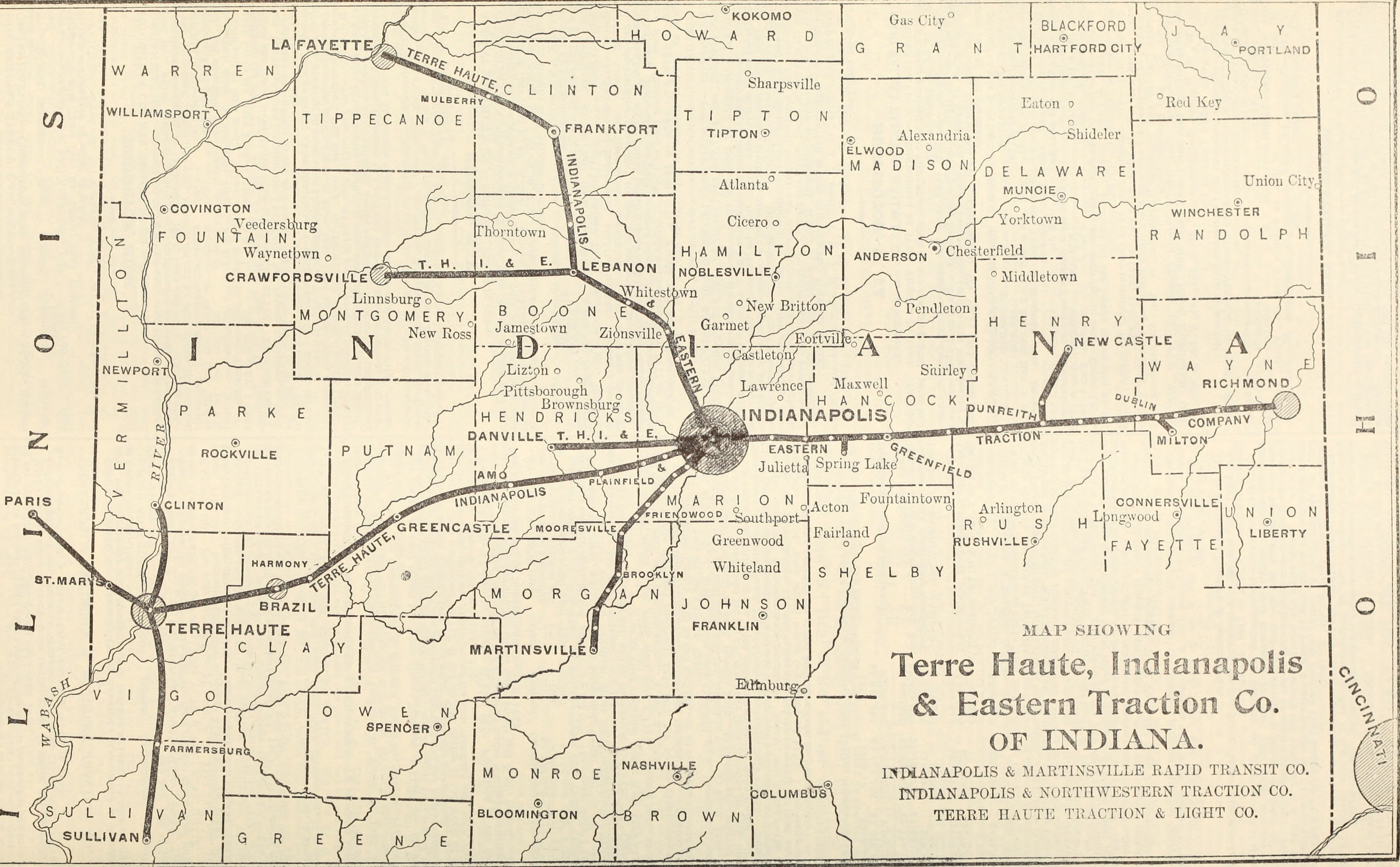
Terre Haute, Indianapolis and Eastern Traction Company map in 1911

Division	Route	Notes
Northwestern-Martinsville	Indianapolis–Lafayette	Discontinued October 31, 1930.
Northwestern-Martinsville	Indianapolis–Martinsville	Discontinued October 31, 1930.
Northwestern-Martinsville	Lebanon–Crawfordsville	Discontinued October 31, 1930.
Eastern	Indianapolis–Richmond	Continued under Indiana Railroad.
Eastern	Dunreith–New Castle	Continued under Indiana Railroad.
Brazil	Terre Haute–Indianapolis	Continued under Indiana Railroad.
Brazil	Indianapolis–Danville	Discontinued October 31, 1930.
Terre Haute	Terre Haute–Clinton	Discontinued May 30, 1931.
Terre Haute	Terre Haute–Sullivan	Discontinued May 30, 1931.
Terre Haute	Terre Haute–Paris	Briefly continued under Indiana Railroad until January 1932.
Terre Haute	Terre Haute–Brazil trippers	
Crawfordsville	Indianapolis–Crawfordsville	Discontinued October 31, 1930.

In addition to the interurban lines, the Terre Haute, Indianapolis and Eastern also operated local streetcar services in Terre Haute, Richmond, Brazil, and New Castle.

== Absorption into Indiana Railroad ==
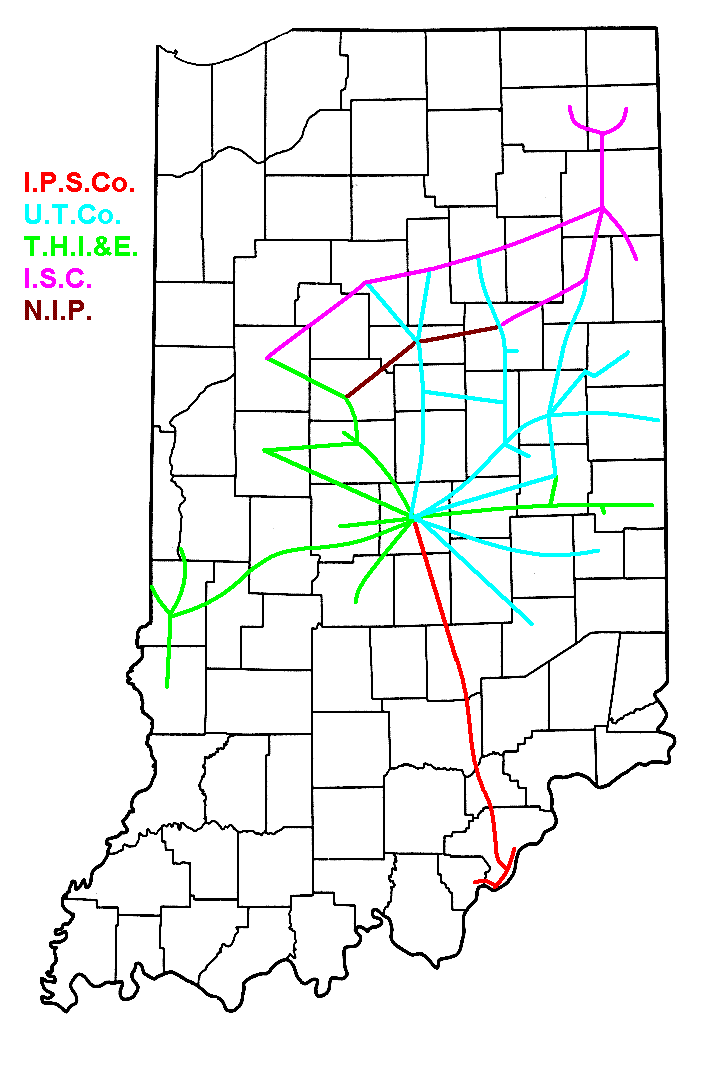
Map of Indiana interurbans in the 1920s

The THI&E was perhaps the financially weakest line of the great Indiana interurban railways. During the prosperous 1920s, its consistent operating deficits were offset only by the sale of power from its coal driven power plants and by the profits of the Indianapolis Street Railway Company, a subsidiary company. The onset of the Depression added to its woes, and on April 2, 1930, the THI&E went into an "operating" bankruptcy called Receivership, in which it continued to operate but was not obligated to pay interest on its bonded debt. At this time Samuel Insull's Midland Utilities was in the process of consolidating most of the major Indiana interurbans (Indiana Service Corporation, Interstate Public Service, Union Traction, Northern Indiana Power, and the THI&E) into the new Indiana Railroad (IR). The unprofitable branch lines that made up much of the THI&E did not fit into Insull's master plan, and they were abandoned. The busy west-east Terre Haute through Indianapolis to Richmond line survived, but the Danville, Martinsville, Lafayette and Crawfordsville branches were abandoned on October 31, 1930. The Sullivan and Clinton lines followed on May 30, 1931. The Following month, Midland Utilities absorbed the THI&E into its Indiana Railroad. Track and facilities were improved, and THI&E's large wood passenger combines were replaced with new lightweight fast passenger cars. Some of the old wood cars became freight box motors. The last of this former THI&E line was abandoned in 1940, and the Indiana Railroad itself abandoned all operations in 1941.

== The essential Dayton and Western connection ==
In 1930, the THI&E (now part of the IR) and the Dayton and Western Traction Company combined their equipment to run direct no car change passenger service from Indianapolis to Dayton, Ohio. As passenger business diminished, the two lines' freight business picked up, and the Dayton and Western was essential for moving freight to Dayton and the rest of Ohio, particularly to industrial Toledo and Cleveland. When the Dayton and Western went bankrupt in 1937, it was a big financial blow to the both Indiana Railroad and its Ohio freight interchange partner at Dayton, the Cincinnati and Lake Erie Railroad. Both the IR and the C&LE ceased operations within a few years.

== Bibliography ==
- Bradley, George K. (1991). Indiana Railroad, The Magic Interurban. CERA Bulletin #128. 224 pp, Chicago, IL: Central Electric Railfan's Association. ISBN 0-915348-28-4.
- "Indiana Railroad System" (PDF). CERA Bulletin. No. 17. Chicago, Illinois: Central Electric Railfan's Association. September 1940.
- CERA Bulletins #19, Various authors and CERA staff (1940). Electric Railways of Indiana includes the Indiana Railroad which took over the THI&E in 1931. Chicago, IL: Central Electric Railfan's Association.
- "Terre Haute Indianapolis & Eastern Traction Company" (PDF). CERA Bulletin. No. 30. Chicago, Illinois: Central Electric Railfan's Association. November 1941.
- CERA Bulletins #101, #102, #104, Various authors and CERA staff (1970s). Electric Railways of Indiana. Chicago, IL: Central Electric Railfan's Association. includes the Indiana Railroad which took over the THI&E in 1931
- Harwood, Herbert (2000). The Lakeshore Electric Story. Bloomington, IN: Indiana University Press.
- Hilton, George W. & Due, John Fitzgerald (1960). The Electric Interurban Railways in America. Stanford, California: Stanford University Press. OCLC 237973.
- Keenan, Jack (1995). Cincinnati and Lake Erie Railroad. Bloomington, IN: Indiana University Press.
- Middleton, William D. (1961). The Interurban Era. Milwaukee, WI: Kalmbach Publishing. OCLC 4357897 – via Archive.org.
- Middleton, Wm. D. (1983). Traction Classics, (4 volumes). San Marino, CA: Golden West Books. ISBN 978-0-87095-085-8.
- Rowsome, Frank (1954). "The Empire of the Interurban". Trolley Car Treasury. New York City: Bonanza Books.
