= Interstate Public Service =

Interurban railway line between Indiana and Kentucky and local streetcar operator

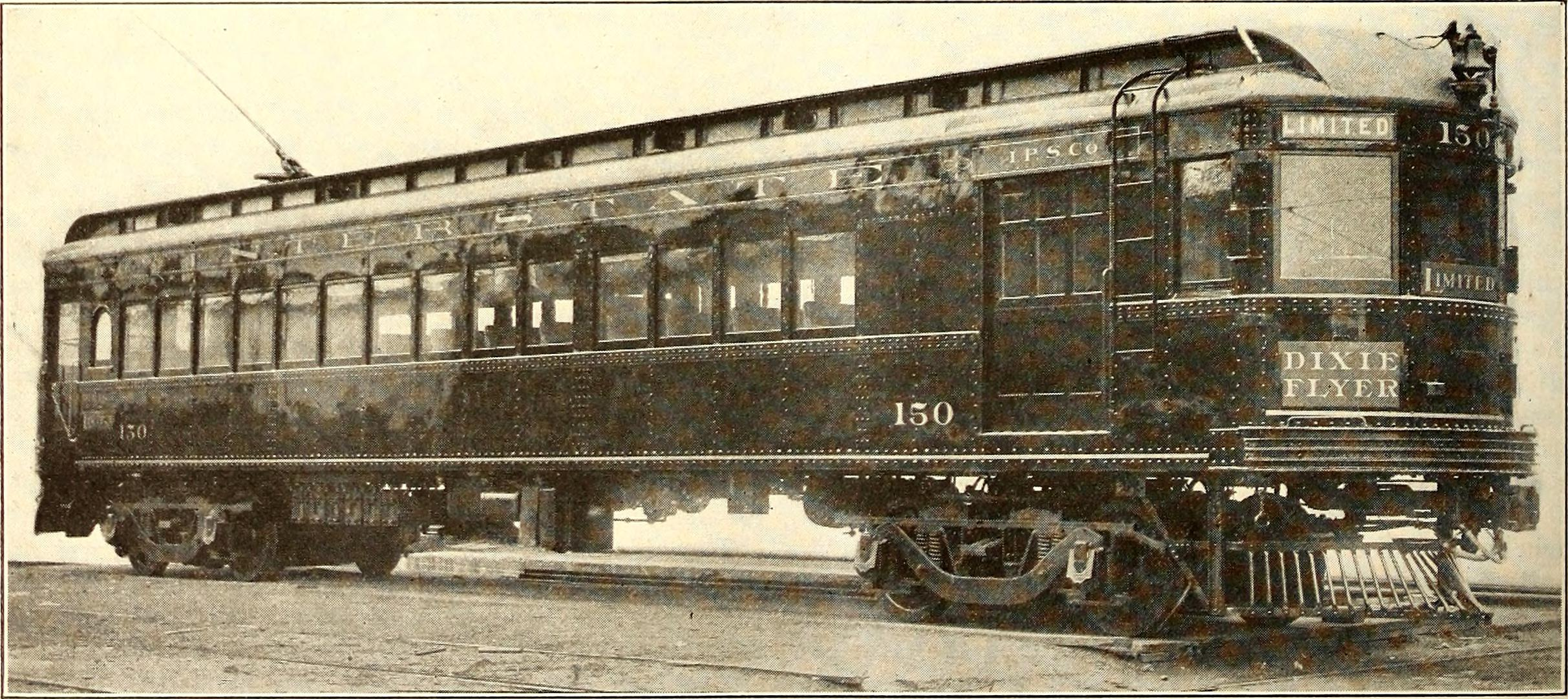
- IPS car 150, signed as the Dixie Flyer, newly delivered in 1921 for improved express service between Indianapolis and Louisville

Overview
- Other name(s): Louisville Line; Seymour Line
- Locale: Indiana, Louisville, Kentucky
- Termini: Indianapolis Traction Terminal; Louisville (until 1939) Seymour (1939–1941)

Service
- Type: Interurban
- System: Indiana Railroad (1931–1941)

History
- Opened: January 1, 1900
- Completed: 1908
- Closed: September 8, 1941

Technical
- Line length: 116.8 mi (188.0 km)
- Character: private right of way and street running with a short segment shared with a steam railroad
- Track gauge: 1,435 mm (4 ft 8 1/2 in) standard gauge
- Electrification: 600 V DC; 1,200 V DC section (until 1921)

Interstate Public Service was an interurban railway in Indiana. The main line was the first interurban to enter Indianapolis, and it would eventually reach Louisville, Kentucky via the Big Four Bridge. Branches ran to New Albany and Charlestown. The line would outlast all other Indiana Railroad services, but was truncated to run as far south as Seymour in 1939 before being discontinued outright in 1941.

== History ==
On March 4, 1891, the Indianapolis, Greenwood and Suburban Railway Company was incorporated. The project was reorganized in 1894 under the name Indianapolis, Greenwood and Franklin Railroad. After some construction, the unfinished road was sold to Charles E. Coffin who disposed of a controlling interest to the Irwins of Columbus in June 1899. Construction was resumed and on the first day of the new century the first interurban car to enter the city of Indianapolis arrived at the terminal of the company's line at Washington and Illinois Streets.

Work on the Franklin extension progressed so rapidly that cars began running on the May 31, 1901. In August 1902, the contract for the Franklin-Columbus extension was let, and September 4, a car ran over the line and regular service was established fifteen days later. On November 20, 1902, the Indianapolis, Greenwood and Franklin Railroad changed its name to the Indianapolis, Columbus and Southern Traction Company.

Being the first line to enter the city, the Indianapolis, Columbus and Southern Traction Company was the first to test the legality of an electric line handling freight. At first merchants objected to the unwieldy cars blocking the streets; but after their rapid and convenient service was demonstrated and the early experience of the company proved somewhat unprofitable, the attitudes of the merchants and traction officials were reversed. Many electric railway officials came to consider the freight business an expensive accommodation because of the extra equipment and men needed.

Surveys for the extension to Seymour began in the spring of 1905. Much difficulty was met in securing the right of way south of Columbus: the Pennsylvania Railroad refused to permit the traction company to cross its tracks in south Columbus at grade level on a private right-of-way. Upon petition of the traction company, the city council opened Madison Avenue across the railroad tracks and a city franchise was then granted. The decision of the Circuit Court that an under or overhead crossing was not practical was sustained by the State Supreme Court and the traction company was allowed to cross at grade. Grading began on the extension May 31, 1905 and the first car was operated September 28, 1907. In May 1910, the track was laid with new rails and in April 1911 several miles of second track were laid south of Indianapolis. The main power station was built at Edinburg; new substations were built in 1908 at Franklin, Columbus and Reddington.

On September 7, 1912, the Indianapolis, Columbus and Southern Traction Company was leased by the Interstate Public Service Commission.

=== Louisville to Sellersburg ===
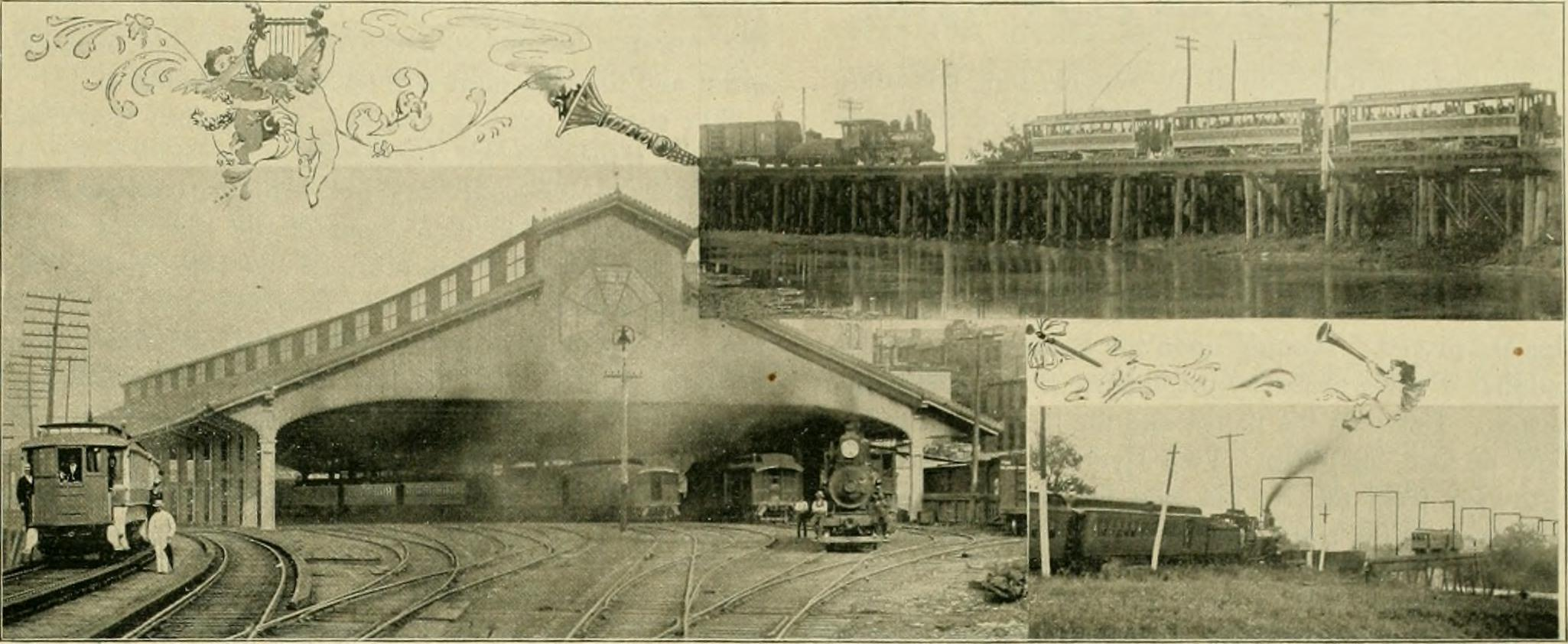
Kentucky & Indiana Terminal Bridge combined steam and electric operation in 1895 — the New Albany Railway operated streetcars at that time, but that company would come under the ownership of Interstate Public Service

The next division of the Indianapolis–Louisville line to be built was the Louisville–Sellersburg section. The Louisville and Southern Indiana Traction Company was incorporated June 17, 1903 and leased the Daisy Line across the Kentucky & Indiana Terminal Bridge and extended it as far north as Charlestown during the summer of 1906. The company made many surveys for a line to Corydon, West Baden, and French Lick. The New Albany–Jeffersonville spur was built by the Jeffersonville City and Suburban Railway Company and operated April 1907.

The railways were acquired by the Louisville and Northern Railway and Lighting Company. In July 1907, the Watson Junction–Sellersburg line was completed.

=== The final connection ===
The gap between Sellersburg and Seymour was built by the Indianapolis and Louisville Traction Company. A bond issue of $1,250,000 (Note: equivalent to $43,191,964 in 2025 adjusted for inflation) was guaranteed by the Colonial Trust Company of Pittsburgh, Pennsylvania, and later, a second one of $400,000. (Note: equivalent to $13,821,429 in 2025 adjusted for inflation) On October 17, 1907, the Sellersburg–Seymour line was incorporated. On February 10, 1908, limited cars began running between Seymour and Louisville; several months later cars ran from Indianapolis to Louisville. Through freight service began in November 1909.

In June, 1911, the Colonial Trust Company of Pittsburgh, and Frank E. Brooks, trustees for the $1,250,000 bond issue, petitioned for a receiver, alleging that no interest had been paid on the funded debt since October 1908. John W. Greely, of Jeffersonville, one of the directors, was appointed receiver on June 26, 1911. On March 28, 1912, the company was reorganized and was called the Indianapolis and Louisville Electric Railway Company. On September 5, 1912, a group from Chicago incorporated the Interstate Public Service Company.

The company owned numerous lighting and heating plants over the state. The Indianapolis and Louisville Electric Railway Company, which purchased at foreclosure sale the Indianapolis and Louisville Traction Company March 21, 1912, was leased by the Interstate Public Service Company. On September 7, 1912, the Indianapolis, Columbus and Southern Traction Company was leased.

The company began offering a flyer service in 1923, operated with new cars ordered from American Car and Foundry and an additional car acquired from the Winona Interurban Railway in 1925 and rebuilt for parlor-diner service. This reduced the trip time to 3 hours 45 minutes by skipping most stops.

After coming under the ownership of the Midlands Utility Corporation, the Interstate Public Service was amalgamated with other statewide interurbans to form the Indiana Railroad system in 1931.

=== Decline ===
The Charlestown branch was discontinued in 1933. The line south of Seymour was abandoned on October 31, 1939. The Seymour service was the final interurban line to serve Indianapolis. After tracks in the Indianapolis Traction Terminal had all been paved over for bus service, Seymour cars continued to call at the northern side of the facility and use the wye to turn around. On the morning of September 8, 1941, a passenger car collided with a work train south of Columbus — the passenger car's motorman and a passenger would eventually succumb to their injuries as a result. Service ceased after the crash and was never restarted.

== Route ==
Starting from the Indianapolis Traction Terminal, cars exited the north side and ran east on Ohio Street and south on Pennsylvania Street to Virginia Avenue. The line continued southeast until Prospect Street where the Indianapolis and Cincinnati Traction Company split to the east. Running south on Shelby Street, the Beech Grove Traction Company tracks left the line at Grande Avenue while the Interstate Public Service tracks continued south, with city tracks departing at Southern Avenue.

Between its two termini, the line largely paralleled the Pennsylvania Railroad.

The Big Four Bridge over the Ohio River between Louisville, Kentucky, and Jeffersonville, Indiana was able to facilitate both stream trains as well as electrified interurbans. Service downtown Louisville was provided via the Louisville Railway Company Prospect line, which was laid to a dual gauge of 5 ft (1,524 mm) and 4 ft 8 1/2 in (1,435 mm). The broad gauge was the city's normal street car gauge and the third rail allowed for trips and freight to be interchanged without transloading.

== Electrification ==
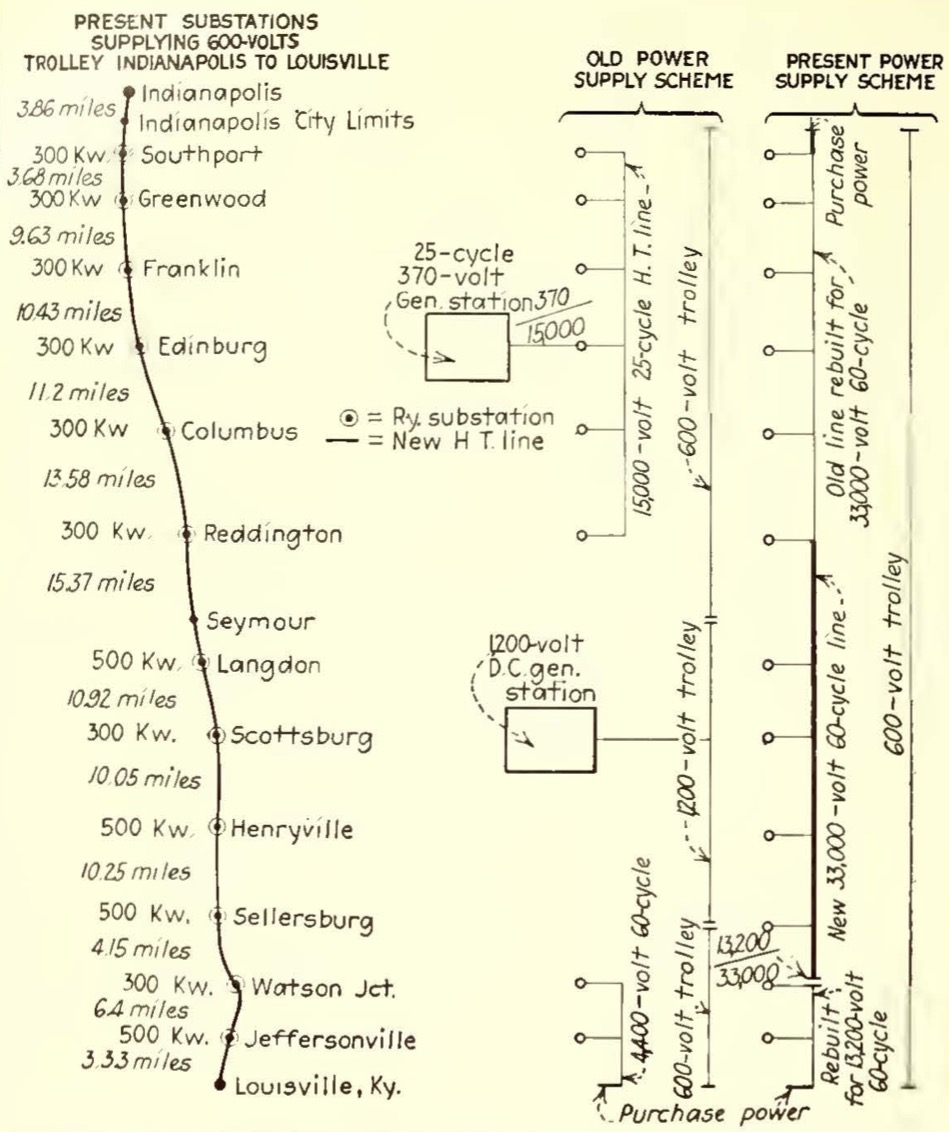
Diagrams showing the location and spacing of substations and layout of the old and then-new power supply schemes, 1921

Originally, when the line between Indianapolis and Louisville was owned and operated by three different companies, the 58 miles (93 km) from Indianapolis to Seymour was operated with 600-volt trolley current supplied by a 25-cycle, 370-volt generating station located at Edinburg, and distributed over a 15,000-volt transmission line extending to Southport on the north and to Reddington on the south and connecting with six rotary-converter substations. The 41-mile (66 km) section of the line from Seymour to Sellersburg was operated at 1,200 volts trolley potential supplied by a reciprocating engine, direct-current generating plant located at Scottsburg, each engine being direct-connected to two 600-volt generators connected in series. Feeders extended approximately 20 miles (32 km) each way from this power house. This was the first high-tension 1,200-volt trolley installation in the country when put in operation in 1908. The 14-mile (23 km) section of the line between Sellersburg and Louisville was operated with a 600-volt trolley current supplied from two converter substations, for which power was purchased from the Louisville Gas & Electric Company and transmitted to it at 4,400 volts. These two substations were operated at 60 cycles frequency and no change in them was required except for the transformers, for which new ones were substituted to receive energy at 13,200 volts instead of 4,400 volts. Cars were outfitted to operate at both trolley voltages.

In 1921, the power system across the line was standardized to 600 volts. Work included the shutting down of one direct-current generating station and one 25-cycle generating station, the building of 54.6 miles (87.9 km) of new 33,000-volt transmission line and the rebuilding of 58.25 miles (93.74 km) of existing transmission lines for higher voltage, the making of arrangements for purchasing power at Louisville and Indianapolis, the junking of the rotary converter and other substation equipment at six substations, the purchase of new converters and switching equipment for ten substations and the erection of six new substation buildings.

== Local services ==
Interstate Public Service also operated the local streetcar systems of Jefferson, Indiana and New Albany, Indiana, as well as a small system in Columbus. It additionally operated the New Albany–Louisville Daisy Line suburban trolley which ran over the Kentucky & Indiana Terminal Bridge.

== See also ==
- Transportation in Louisville, Kentucky
- Streetcars in Indianapolis
- Tram-train
