= Daisy Line =

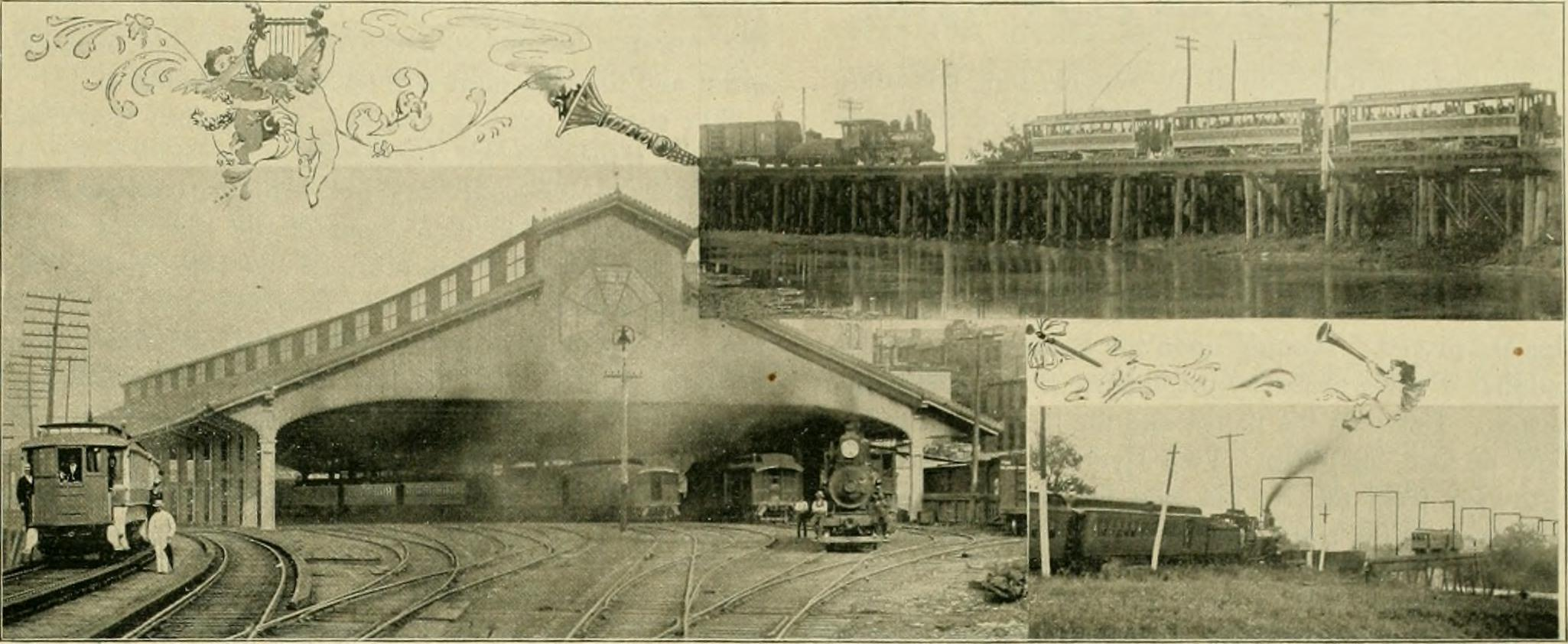
Kentucky & Indiana Terminal Bridge combined steam and electric operation in 1895 — the New Albany Railway operated the Daisy Line at that time, but that company would come under the ownership of Interstate Public Service.

The Daisy Line was a suburban trolley service which ran between New Albany, Indiana and Louisville, Kentucky.

Upon completion of the Kentucky & Indiana Terminal Bridge in 1885, the company which built the bridge began operating the Daisy Line as a steam locomotive commuter train service. In 1887, the line was extended to the baseball park. Ridership quickly rose to 560,000 annually the following year. In 1893, the Daisy Line trains were electrified, the first steam to electric conversion in the U.S. (Note: The August 15, 1895 issue of Street Railway Review notes that the K&I electrification was undertaken only for passenger operations, while the Nantasket Beach Railroad electrified all freight and passenger trips.) The train was subject of feature articles in technical journals and was pictured in Engineering News. Louisville's heavy rail electrification even preceded the electrification of the famous Chicago's 'L' trains by two years.

Passengers traveled in multi-unit three-car elevated electric trains which called at ten stations between Vincennes Street in New Albany and 1st Street in Louisville. Cars were timetabled between full-sized steam trains of the Baltimore and Ohio Southwestern Railroad, Southern Railway, and local switching services. This rapid transit service was wildly popular, with its 15-minute service and convenient schedules from 6am to midnight, ridership soared exponentially from day one. By 1906, a ridership survey found 3,425 commuter passengers crossing daily and 1,250,000 passengers per year, crossing the K&I Bridge on these rapid electric trains.

Expenditures for replacing wooden bridge railings and retrofitting the west Louisville wooden elevated segments with steel resulted in receivership for the Kentucky and Indiana Bridge Company. The company reorganized in 1899 as the Kentucky and Indiana Bridge and Railroad Company. There was no interruption of the electric commuter train or other bridge heavy rail, line hauled freight and passenger trains.

The Louisiana and Southern Indiana Traction Company purchased the service in 1905. In late 1907, the new company sold its commuter train equipment to another company, completely exiting the commuter rail business. By spring of 1908, the elevated line in west Louisville, the downtown Louisville elevated tracks and elevated stations were no longer used.

In March 1908, the new operator changed all of the equipment gauge, making crossings via a broad gauge gauntlet track over the bridge, with a down ramp immediately afterward, to connect to Louisville's 5 ft (1,524 mm) gauge streetcar tracks. The 1908 version of service was essentially converted to trolleys including single car runs, but two car trains were retained for rush hour to meet the heavy patronage and ridership expectations built up over the decades.

The service would go on to be acquired by Interstate Public Service, the company which operated the interurban line between Louisville and Indianapolis. The Daisy Line was the only streetcar line operating in the city in the immediate aftermath of the Great Flood of 1913.

Fares initially were set at 5¢. After World War I, the cash fare rose to 10¢, discounted to 9¢ or three for 25¢ for commuters.

The service was ultimately acquired by the New Albany and Louisville Railway Company in 1934. Rail service ceased on December 30, 1945, when the line was converted to bus operations.

== See also ==
- Railroad electrification in the United States
- Tram-train
- Transportation in Louisville, Kentucky
