= Drew Park =

- Neighborhood
- Location within the state of Florida
- Coordinates: 27°59′7″N 82°30′54″W
- Country: United States
- State: Florida
- County: Hillsborough
- City: Tampa

Population (2010)
  - Total: 1,780
- Time zone: UTC-5 (Eastern (EST))
  - Summer (DST): UTC-4 (EDT)
- ZIP codes: 33607 and 33614

Drew Park is a neighborhood within the city limits of Tampa, Florida. As of the 2010 census, the neighborhood had a population of 1,780. The ZIP Codes serving the neighborhood are 33607 and 33614.

== Geography ==
Drew Park boundaries are Hillsborough Avenue to the north, Tampa Bay Blvd. to the south, Tampa International Airport to the west, and Dale Mabry Highway to the east. The area is flat but above any flood zones.

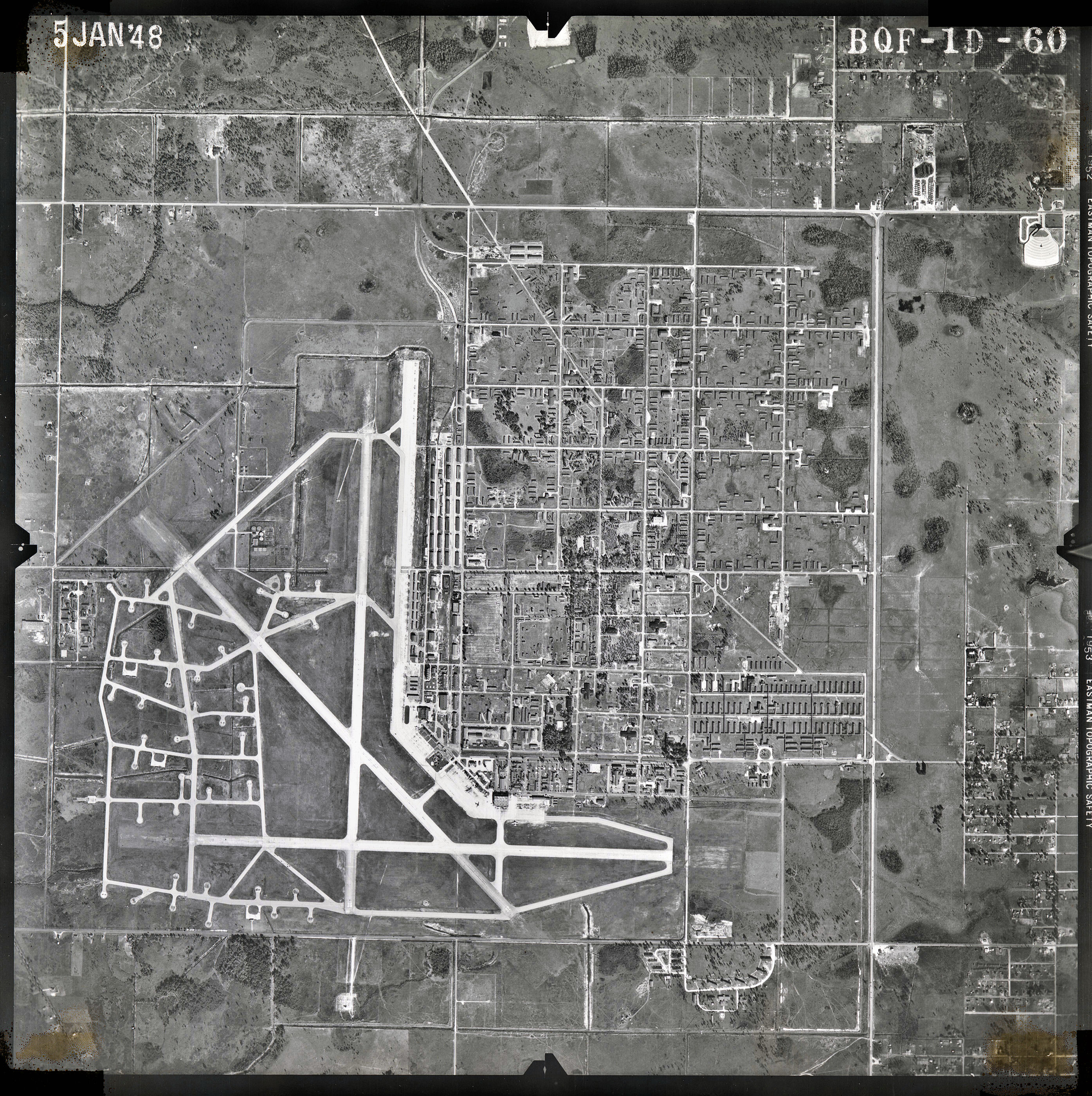
Drew Field in 1948

== History ==
Drew Park was originally Drew Field, named for cattleman and land developer John H. Drew. It was Tampa's first municipal airport, a 130-acre (0.53 km^{2}) grass airfield that opened in 1928. At the onset of World War II, the federal government took over the field and developed a military base containing airstrips, barracks, field hospitals, and a German and Italian POW camp. The City of Tampa leased the field to the army for one dollar a year. During this period, a weekly newspaper called Drew Field Echoes was published that covered news from the base.

Parts of the film Air Force were filmed here. The base theater is still standing today as the Playhouse Adult Theater. Dale Mabry Highway was built in 1943 to link Drew Field with MacDill Air Force Base to the south.

Drew Park was where the W. T. Edwards Tuberculosis Hospital was located before it was demolished.

In 1988, Hillsborough County Aviation Authority announced long-term plans to acquire several hundred acres in Drew Park for the expansion of Tampa International. This will include the redevelopment of the Airport's air cargo facility, aircraft maintenance, fuel farms, equipment maintenance, Aircraft Rescue Fire Training facilities and other aviation-related facilities. To date, the authority has acquired 96% of the parcels in the land acquisition area.

Drew Park is now home to the main campus of the Hillsborough Community College and George M. Steinbrenner Field, as well as Raymond James Stadium. Auto dealerships populate much of the Dale Mabry edge of Drew Park and shopping and restaurants make up the Hillsborough Ave edge. The core of Drew Park is occupied by light industry, adult entertainment establishments and several homes, due to its mixed-use zoning. Law enforcement has conducted many raids on the businesses in the area accusing them of prostitution, operating without licenses, and illegally selling alcohol.

=== Durex Industrial ===
On June 13, 1992, two nine-year-old boys, Scotty Perez and Anthony Storman, died after climbing into an open dumpster containing toxic chemicals. The dumpster was used by Durex Industrial, Inc. at 4815 N West Shore Blvd. to illegally dispose of toluene which was used in the manufacturing of printing rollers. Two employees, William C. Whitman and Duane C. Whitman, were sentenced to 27-month prison sentences for illegally handling, storing or disposing of toluene. Durex Industries was fined $1.5-million. A Hillsborough county jury awarded the families a $500-million verdict against the company. The corporation itself was broke and no money was paid to the families. In 1998, the owner William Recht Jr. agreed to pay each family $400,000 and a $200,000 fine after pleading guilty to storing hazardous wastes without a permit. He was sentenced to 30 months of probation.

The incident caused many businesses in the area to install locks on their dumpsters. It later inspired the play The Toxic Wave by Susan Hussey, co-founder of the Drew Park-based Gorilla Theatre.

== Demographics ==
Source: Hillsborough County Atlas

As of the census of 2010, there were 1,780 people and 654 households residing in the neighborhood. The population density was 1,376/mi^{2}. The racial makeup of the neighborhood was 66% White, 15% African American, 2% Native American, 2% Asian, 11% from some other race and 4% from two or more races. Hispanic or Latino of any race were 58% of the population.

There were 654 households, out of which 22% had children under the age of 18 living with them, 21% were married couples living together, 13% had a female householder with no husband present, and 25% were non-families. 32% of all households were made up of individuals.

In the neighborhood the population was spread out, with 20% under the age of 18, 39% from 18 to 34, 20% from 35 to 49, 25% from 50 to 64, and 7% who were 65 years of age or older. For every 100 females, there were 142.9 males.

The per capita income for the neighborhood was $9,887. About 26% of the population were below the poverty line, 19% of those under age 18 and 12% of those age 65 or over.

== See also ==
- Neighborhoods in Tampa, Florida
