= Gorilla Theatre =

Gorilla Theatre may refer to:

- Gorilla Theatre (venue), a performing arts venue in the Drew Park area of Tampa, Florida
- Gorilla Theatre (format), a form of improvisational theatre developed by director Keith Johnstone
