= Aubrey Hampton =

American biochemist and writer (1934–2011)

Aubrey Hampton (October 23, 1934 – May 9, 2011) was an American biochemist and writer. He was the founder of Aubrey Organics, a hair- and skin-care company, and the co-founder of the Gorilla Theatre, both located in Tampa, Florida.

Born in New Albany, Indiana, Hampton studied at Indiana University and received a Ph.D. in biochemistry from New York University. In 1967, he founded Aubrey Organics and would create more than 200 natural-ingredient products.

In 1990, Hampton and Susan Hussey founded the Gorilla Theatre; Hampton and Hussey married in 1999. Hampton authored several plays, including the George Bernard Shaw biographical work GBS and Company, that were staged by the company. He also launched the Young Dramatists' Project, which allowed teenage writers to see their plays professionally staged.
