= Winona Interurban Railway =

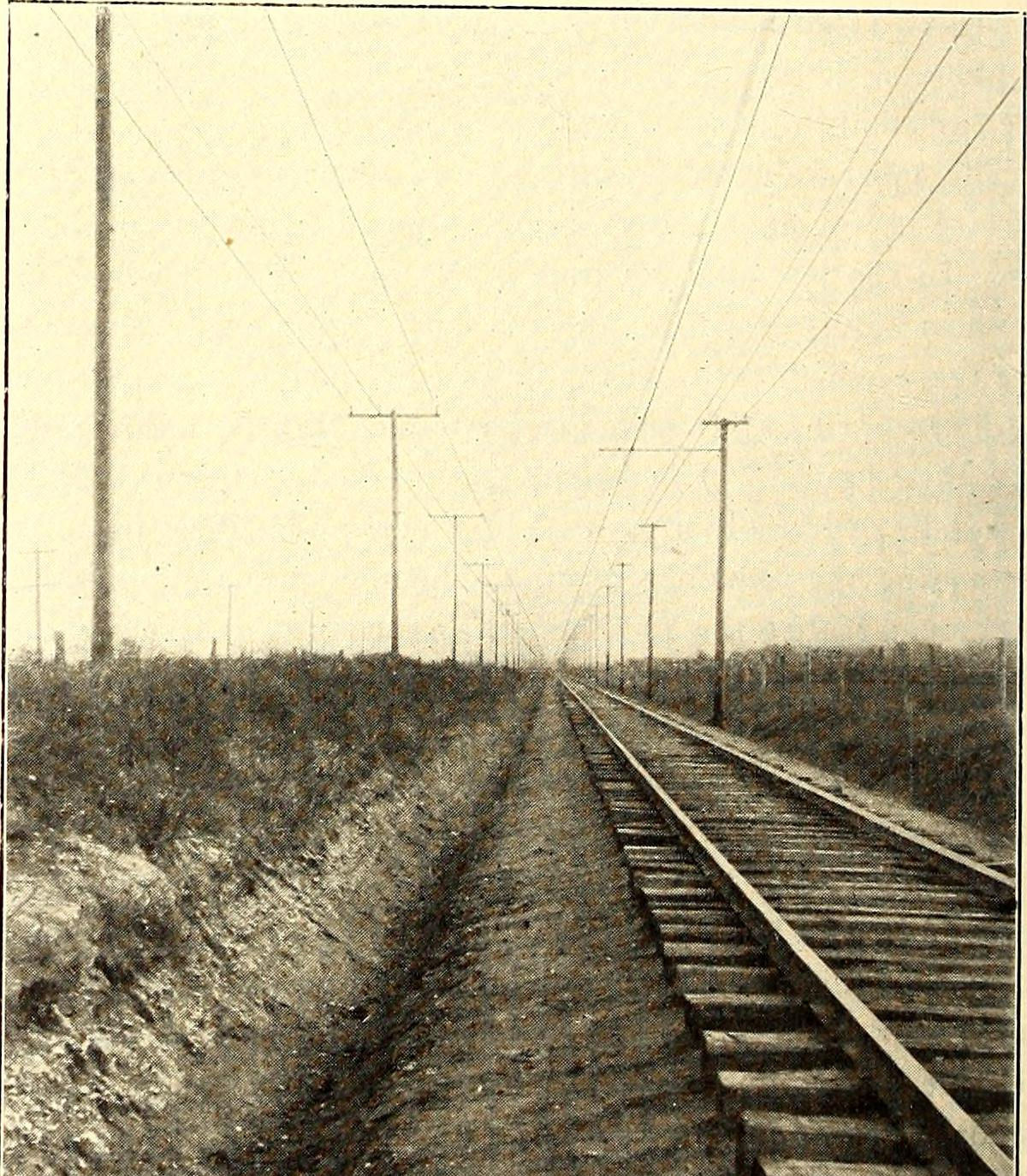
- Long tangent along the Winona Interurban main line

Overview
- Locale: Indiana

History
- Opened: October 30, 1902
- Completed: February 4, 1910
- Closed: 1938 (passenger); 1952 (freight)

Technical
- Line length: 69 mi (111 km)
- Character: Interurban
- Track gauge: 1,435 mm (4 ft 8 1/2 in) standard gauge
- Electrification: until 1938

The Winona Interurban Railway grew out of the need for a north and south interurban railway running through Warsaw, Indiana where Winona Lake and its numerous assemblies could be easily reached. The railway would go on to operate between Goshen and Peru, Indiana, connecting with the Chicago, South Bend and Northern Indiana Railway at Goshen, which in turn connected with the Chicago, Lake Shore and South Bend Railway at South Bend. At Peru, it connected with the Indiana Union Traction Company Peru Line and the Fort Wayne and Wabash Valley Traction Company. The Winona line also interchanged at Peru with the Chesapeake and Ohio Railway and Wabash Railroad. The line was called the "connecting link" because it connected the north and central traction systems of Indiana. In spite of its inviting prospects the line would fail to live up to its initial hype; it carried few local passengers near Peru, Akron, Warsaw, and Elkhart and very few through passengers except during the special seasons at the Park. The line was noted for its initial ownership's and patronage's close ties to local religious organizations.

== History ==
The Winona and Warsaw Railway Company, incorporated October 30, 1902, gave connection between the city of Warsaw and the Lake. The cars were operated at first by a small steam engine.

On July 5, 1904, the Winona Interurban Railway Company was incorporated to build from Wabash to Goshen through Warsaw. On June 12, 1905, a company with the same name was incorporated to construct lines of railways from Warsaw to Goshen, Peru, Wabash, Ft. Wayne, Columbia City, Plymouth, Valparaiso, Logansport, Rochester, Huntington, and Syracuse. The immediate object was to build the Peru–Warsaw–Goshen line. That summer work started on the route north from Warsaw and in June 1906, cars began to run. Work began on the south line in May 1906. Much difficulty was met in grading the region around Mentone because of the sinking of the grade; the ground was so soft that ox teams were used in places.

For the Peru–Chili section the company leased the old Eel River Railroad which was nine miles (14 km) long and included a $40,000 bridge several years old. The piece of line was electrified and began operations in May 1907. In January 1908, cars ran as far north from Peru as Akron; the Warsaw–Mentone section was opened in March 1909, and February 4, 1910, the first Peru–Warsaw car ran over the 69-mile (111 km) line that connected two of the great interurban systems in Indiana.

The line was built by bond issues, the stock being held by directors of the Winona Assembly and representing control only. All dividends were to be paid into the endowment funds of the colleges at Winona. Being promoted and owned by a religious association, there was much agitation over the Sunday operation of cars. It was rumored several times that connecting electric and steam lines, realizing the profit to be obtained from the Sunday traffic that would be carried to and from such a popular resort, endeavored to force seven-day operation, and failing, sought to buy the line. Certain directors tabled all motions pertaining to Sunday operation whenever they were proposed. In June 1908, the Electrical Installations Company of Chicago entered a bill of complaint against the Winona Interurban Railway, the Winona Assembly Summer Schools Association, and the Warsaw and Winona Railway Company asking that the companies be compelled to operate their lines seven days a week and petitioning for a receiver. The plaintiff alleged that there had been a verbal agreement to operate on Sunday. The ground for complaint was that the railway, because of insufficient traffic, could not pay interest on $425,000 in bonds which the builders had received as part payment. After a bitter struggle the directors voted to appease the complainant by operating seven days a week; accordingly, Sunday service was inaugurated March 9, 1909. In June 1907, the Winona Interurban Railway, Northern Indiana Traction Company and the Southern Michigan Traction Company arranged schedules with lake steamers to meet cars at Michigan City to carry the Chicago passengers and freight across Lake Michigan. Limited service between Michigan City and Peru began November 10, 1910. Starting in 1910, the Winona and Warsaw Railway was leased to the Winona Interurban Railway for a period of 99 years. This allowed for freight interchange with the Pennsylvania Railroad. The company was operating cars over the tracks of the Indiana Union Traction Company to Indianapolis, which briefly ran through to South Bend.

A receiver operated the line starting July 25, 1916, when one was appointed pursuant to the action of foreclosing the mortgage on the Goshen–Warsaw division. No directors had been chosen since 1915. The company would go on to be reorganized as the Winona Railroad in 1924. The new company had similar corporate makeup to Interstate Public Service, another Indiana interurban.

Mainline passenger service ended in 1934 as the northern connection at Goshen was severed when the Chicago, South Bend and Northern Indiana Railway ceased operation. Freight operations as far as New Paris continued, and Birney safety cars ran between Wabash and Winona Lake until 1938. Electric operations ended that year. By the end of service in 1952, tracks had been truncated further to Wabash.

== Service ==
The connection to South Bend via Goshen formed an important junction point in the through-haul of freight from Indianapolis to Benton Harbor, via the Indiana Union Traction Company, the Winona Interurban Railway, and the Southern Michigan Railway – lines popularly known as the route of the Cannon-Ball Express. The Southern Michigan Railway connected, at Benton Harbor, Michigan, with the Graham & Morton steamship line, which operated a boat service between Chicago and Benton Harbor.

Beginning about 1916, the Winona Interurban Railway was hauling a considerable amount of Chicago freight to and from the territory reached by its line. The interurban track and special work was so constructed that standard M. C. B. steam road equipment could be operated over the entire system. The Winona Interurban Railway was able to render considerable relief in handling carload interchange traffic with the Wabash Railroad at Peru. By 1918, it was handling on an average sixty carloads a month, not including the less than carload shipments. These, collected into carload lots, would equal another sixty cars.

With respect to the general freight service that could be rendered by the Winona Interurban, equipment was then available to handle from ten to fifteen more cars a day. Its location was such that it gave a north and south line crossing territory that was served by trunk-lines running generally east and west. Thus the Winona Interurban Railway would be able to save considerable detour of freight. Carload freight could be taken from any of the interchanging steam lines and handled for distribution to any point in the territory.

The Cannon-Ball Express was a through freight service from Indianapolis to Warsaw and through to Benton Harbor. This service was maintained by a trailer loaded for Indianapolis, leaving Benton Harbor at night and going via the Southern Michigan Railway to Goshen. At this point a Winona interurban motor car picked it up and proceeded to Peru, where it generally picked up a Union Traction Company trailer. By the time the train reached Indianapolis, therefore, it was a regular three-car freight train. Return service was given from Indianapolis in similar manner, the train leaving at approximately 6 p. m. The service was especially useful in the transportation of perishable commodities.

== Rolling stock ==
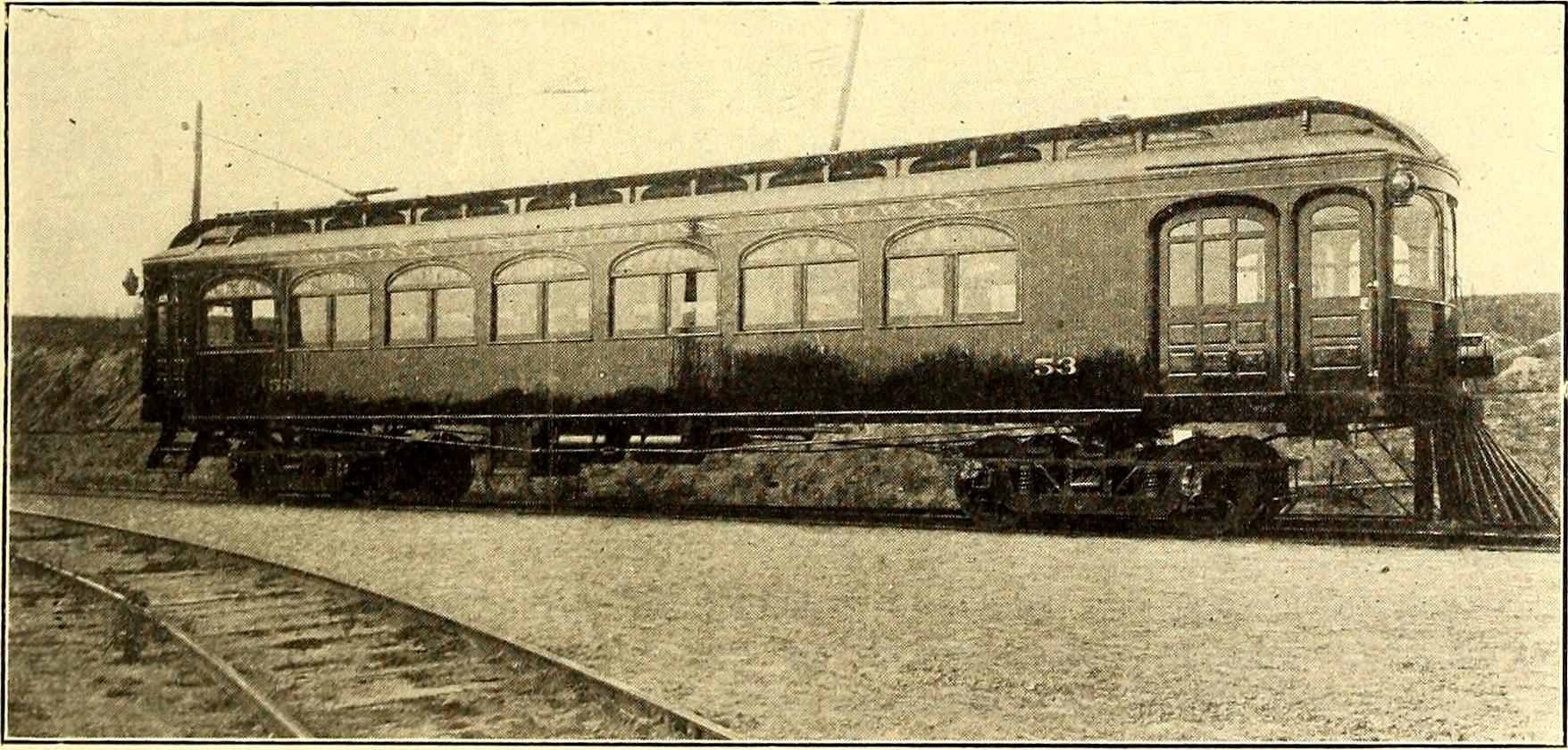
One of the original 1906 rolling stock

By November 1907, the Winona Interurban operated with four cars, with an additional six on order. These cars were built for single-end operation with a width of 9 feet 4 inches (2.84 m), not much narrower than a standard Pullman car. They were geared for operation at 50 miles per hour (80 km/h), though were tested to run at 75 miles per hour (121 km/h).

At the end of 1924, the railway owned seventeen passenger and thirty-nine freight cars.
