= Angelina Maria Collins =

American writer

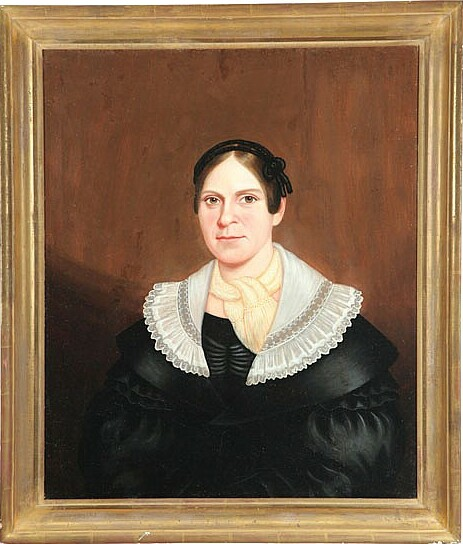
- portrait by Milton W. Hopkins, 1842
- Born: May 26, 1805; Petersburg
- Died: September 28, 1885 (aged 80); Salem
- Occupation: Writer
- Spouse(s): James Collins

Angelina Maria Collins (May 26, 1805 – September 28, 1885) was an American writer. She wrote the first cookbook published in Indiana.

She was born Angelina Maria Lorain or Lorraine on May 26, 1805 in Petersburg, Virginia into a family of Methodists and abolitionists. She married James Collins, a lawyer, in 1830. They moved to Paoli, Indiana for three years, then permanently settled in New Albany, Indiana, where James Collins became mayor, a state legislator, and a newspaper publisher.

In 1851, she published Mrs. Collins’ Table Receipts; Adapted to Western Housewifery. In 1857 it was republished as The Great Western Cookbook, Or Table Receipts Adapted to Western Housewifery. Recipes included were for "California soup", a recipe for making bullion cubes named for those travelling to the California Gold Rush, corn pone, "Succotash a la Tecumseh", and mock turtle soup.

Collins also wrote a temperance novel, Mrs. Ben Darby: Or The Weal and Woe of a Social Life (1853). In his survey of early Indiana literature, Arthur Shumaker writes that it is "terrible" and "sheer propaganda": "It is difficult to enumerate the number of habitual drunkards, who reel and rage their way through the pages of this novel, leaving almost innumerable innocent victims along the way." He notes that it is unusual for a temperance novel in that it focuses on the drunkenness of a woman instead of a man.

Angelina Maria Collins died on 28 September 1885 in Salem, Indiana.
