= Northern Indiana Railway =

Defunct railway based in South Bend, Indiana

The Northern Indiana Railway was a South Bend, Indiana-based company which operated interurban and streetcar lines. At its peak it had interurban lines radiating out from South Bend to Michigan City and Goshen, Indiana, and through its Southern Michigan Railway affiliate to St. Joseph, Michigan, plus streetcar lines in several cities. In St. Joseph trains of the NI met steamship lines from Chicago.

The Northern Indiana competed with its better known rival, the Chicago Lake Shore & South Bend (later, the Chicago South Shore and South Bend or South Shore Line) between South Bend and Michigan City with the two interurban lines running parallel to each other for a number of miles west of South Bend before the NI took a more southerly direction to pass through La Porte. Unlike the South Shore Line, the Northern Indiana failed to develop significant carload freight business. Its main carload freight customer was a South Bend water works plant on the city's north side where it delivered coal from a connection with the Pennsylvania Railroad Vandalia Line on the south side of South Bend.

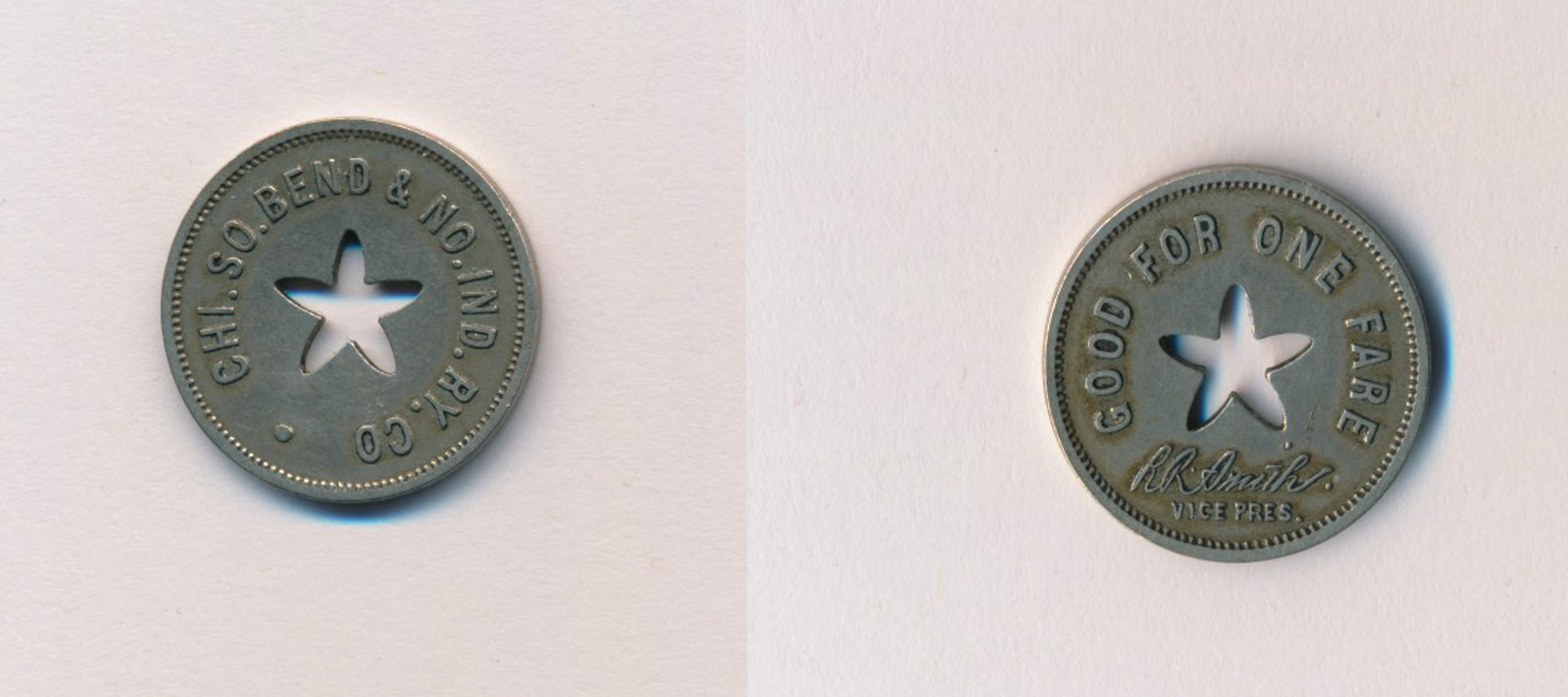
Token used by passengers on the Northern Indiana Railway streetcars.

== History ==
The NI originated in 1885 as the South Bend Railway Company. Going through restarts, reorganizations, affiliated companies, and name changes, it became the Chicago South Bend & Northern Indiana Railway Company (CSB&NI) in 1907. A 1930 reorganization resulted in the successor Northern Indiana Railway, Inc.

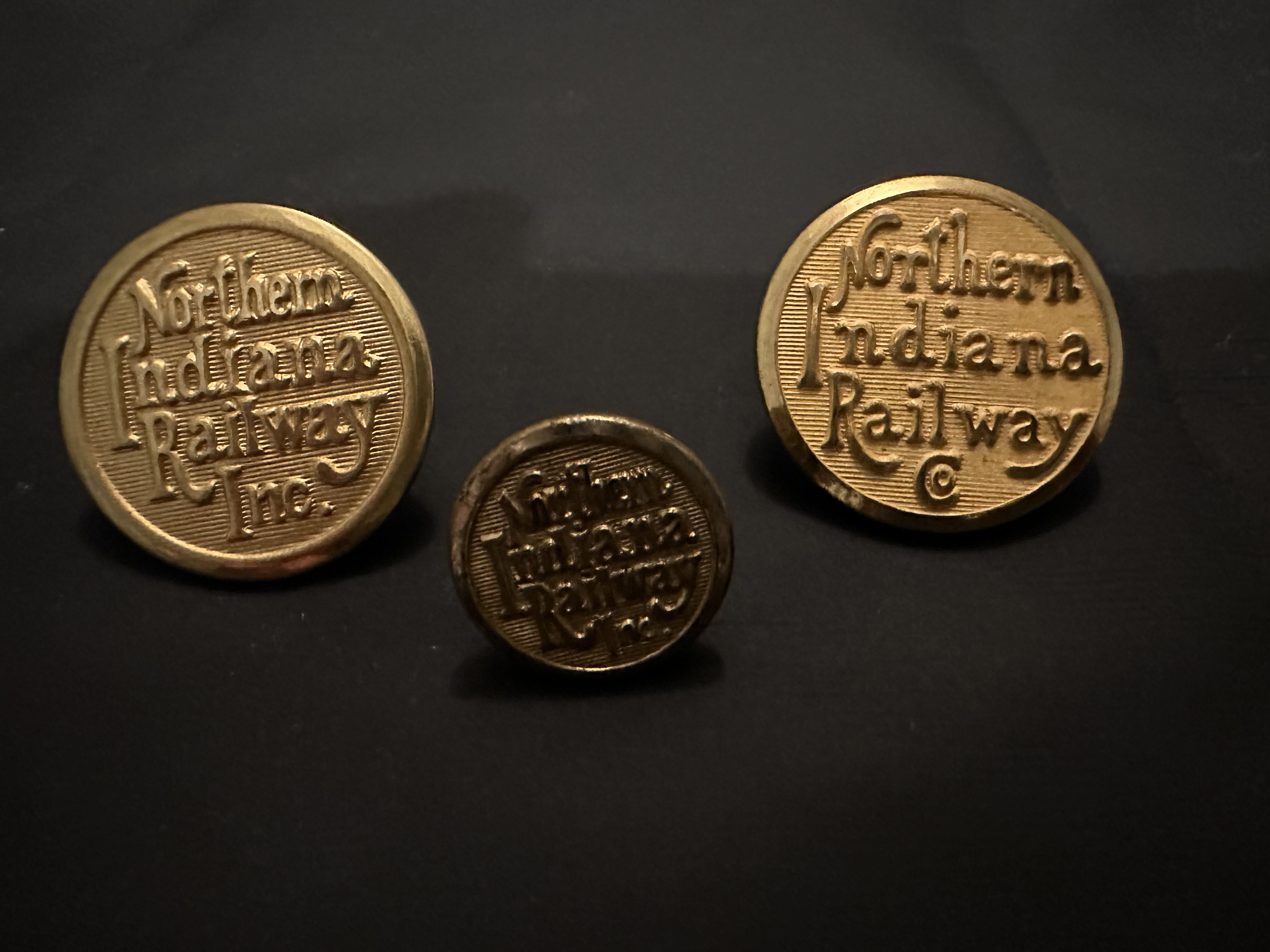
Brass buttons used on the uniforms of Northern Indiana Railway operating employees like motormen.

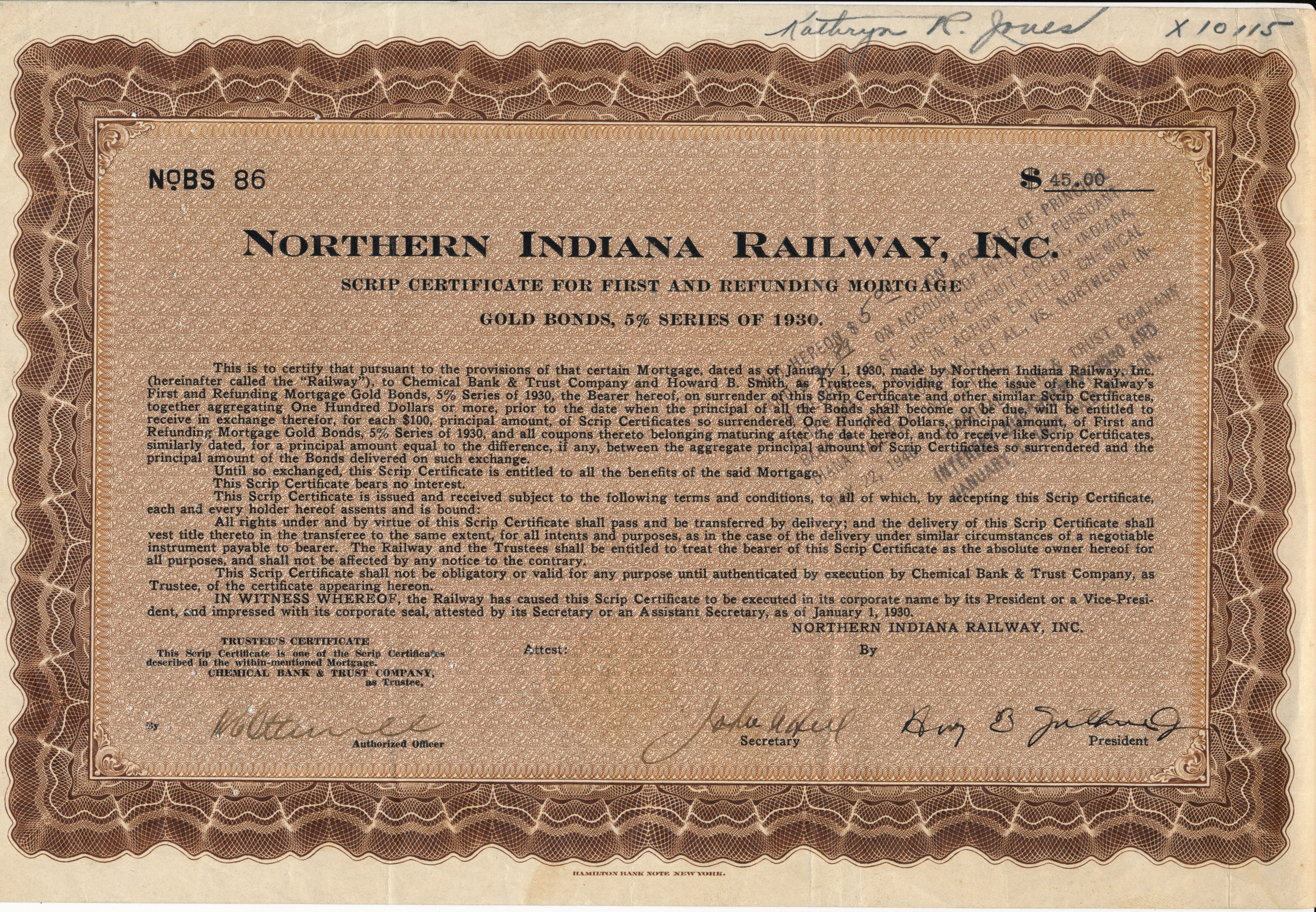
Bond issued on behalf of the Northern Indiana Railway.

In 1934 the Northern Indiana abandoned its interurban lines to focus on its core streetcar operations in South Bend and the neighboring city of Mishawaka, IN. The ending of interurban service to Goshen on the east broke the link between Chicago area interurbans and those of the rest of Indiana and into Ohio via the NI connection with the Winona Interurban Railway.

In June 1940 the Northern Indiana discontinued its last five streetcar operations and converted to buses. That move would be regretted when the US entered World War II at the end of 1941 and the greater capacity of the streetcars over buses would have been helpful in moving workers to and from plants like Studebaker that had converted to wartime production.

== Remnants ==
Little is left today of the Northern Indiana Railway. A few remains include the current South Shore Line/NICTD alignment along Westmoor Street which uses the former Northern Indiana interurban line from Michigan City alignment, concrete bridge abutments at Juday Creek, and a portion of the fill over St. Mary's Creek on the St. Mary's College campus which was part of the Northern Indiana interurban line to St. Joseph, MI.
