= Susan Hussey (playwright) =

American playwright (1954–2009)

Susan Elaine Hussey (June 1, 1954 – February 19, 2009) was an American playwright and co-founder of the Gorilla Theatre performing arts venue in Tampa, Florida.

Hussey was born in Martinsville, Indiana, and graduated from Martinsville High School in 1972. She then received a Bachelor of Arts in English from Indiana University Bloomington in 1977. She received a master's degree in English literature from the University of South Florida in 1984. While completing her studies, she took a typist job at the Tampa-based Aubrey Organics, a natural cosmetics company. She stayed with the company, working her way up to vice president of marketing and advertising and becoming the editor of the company's quarterly magazine Organica. In 1999, she married Dr. Aubrey Hampton, the company's founder and president.

In 1990, Hampton and Hussey founded the Gorilla Theatre for the presentation of both socially conscious dramatic work and light entertainment. Hussey's plays included Plutography in the Slave Trade (1990), The Dressing Room (1993, Off-Broadway premiere in 1994), Small Mammals (1997), Christmas Trio (1998) and The Toxic Wave (2000). In 2002, the University of Tampa Press published a book of The Toxic Wave and The Dressing Room.
