= Gorilla Theatre (venue) =

Gorilla Theatre was a performing arts venue in the Drew Park area of Tampa, Florida. Founded in 1990 by playwrights Aubrey Hampton and Susan Hussey, closing its doors in the summer of 2015. The 76-seat full-season theatre presented original dramas, musicals and revivals of classic works. The venue was also the home of an ongoing series of jazz concerts and the annual Gorilla Theatre's Young Dramatists' Project, which offers full-scale productions of original works by teenage playwrights.
