= New Albany, Indiana =

- City
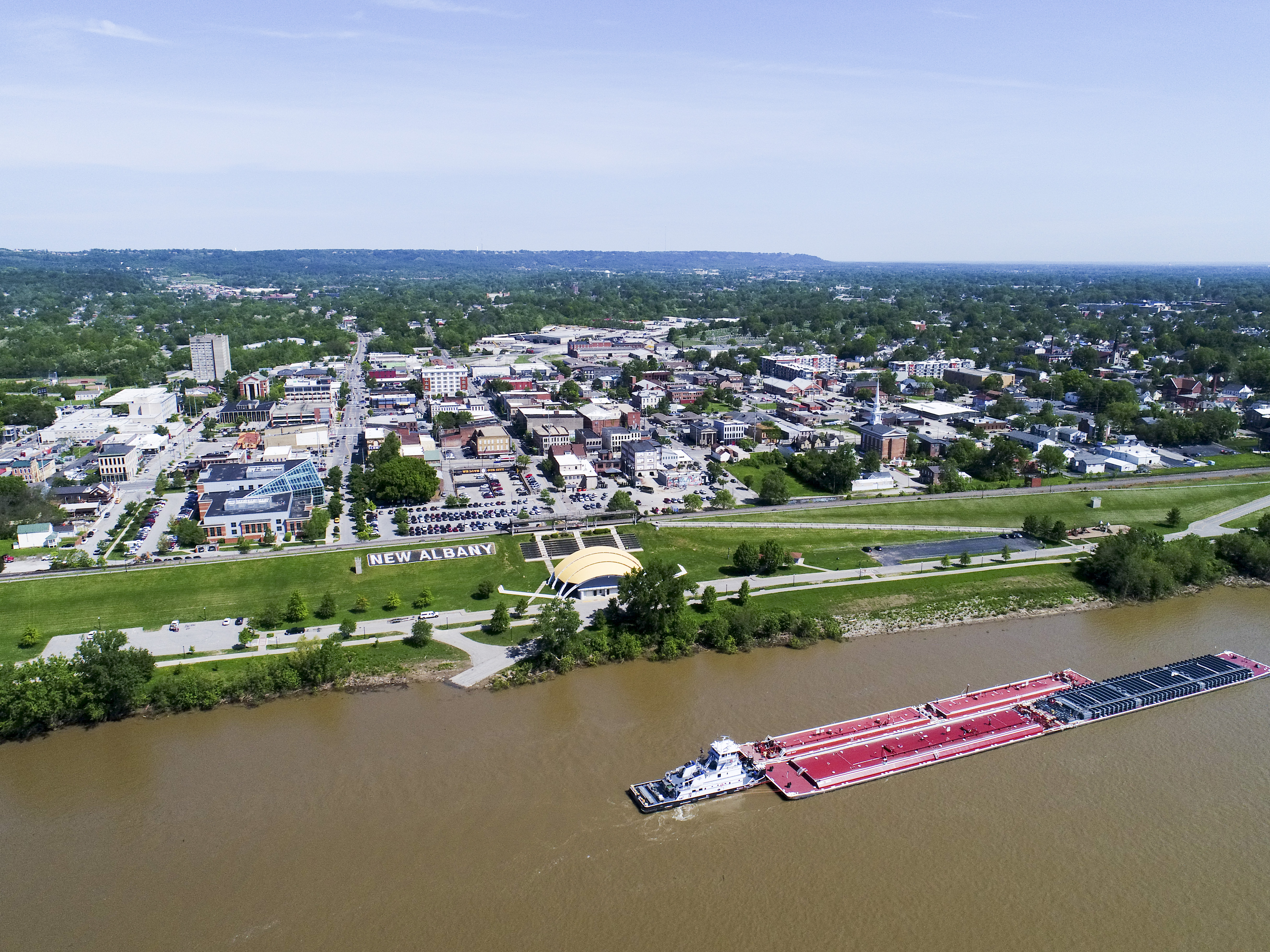
- New Albany as seen from the Ohio River

- Flag Seal

- Location of New Albany in Floyd County, Indiana.
- Coordinates: 38°18′33″N 85°49′24″W
- Country: United States
- State: Indiana
- County: Floyd
- Township: New Albany

Government
  - Mayor: Jeff Gahan (D)

Area
  - Total: 15.64 sq mi (40.50 km^{2})
  - Land: 15.47 sq mi (40.06 km^{2})
  - Water: 0.17 sq mi (0.45 km^{2})
- Elevation: 469 ft (143 m)

Population (2020)
  - Total: 37,841
  - Density: 2,447/sq mi (944.7/km^{2})
- Time zone: UTC−5 (EST)
  - Summer (DST): UTC−4 (EDT)
- ZIP codes: 47150-47151
- Area codes: 812 & 930
- FIPS code: 18-52326
- GNIS feature ID: 2395181
- Website: cityofnewalbany.com

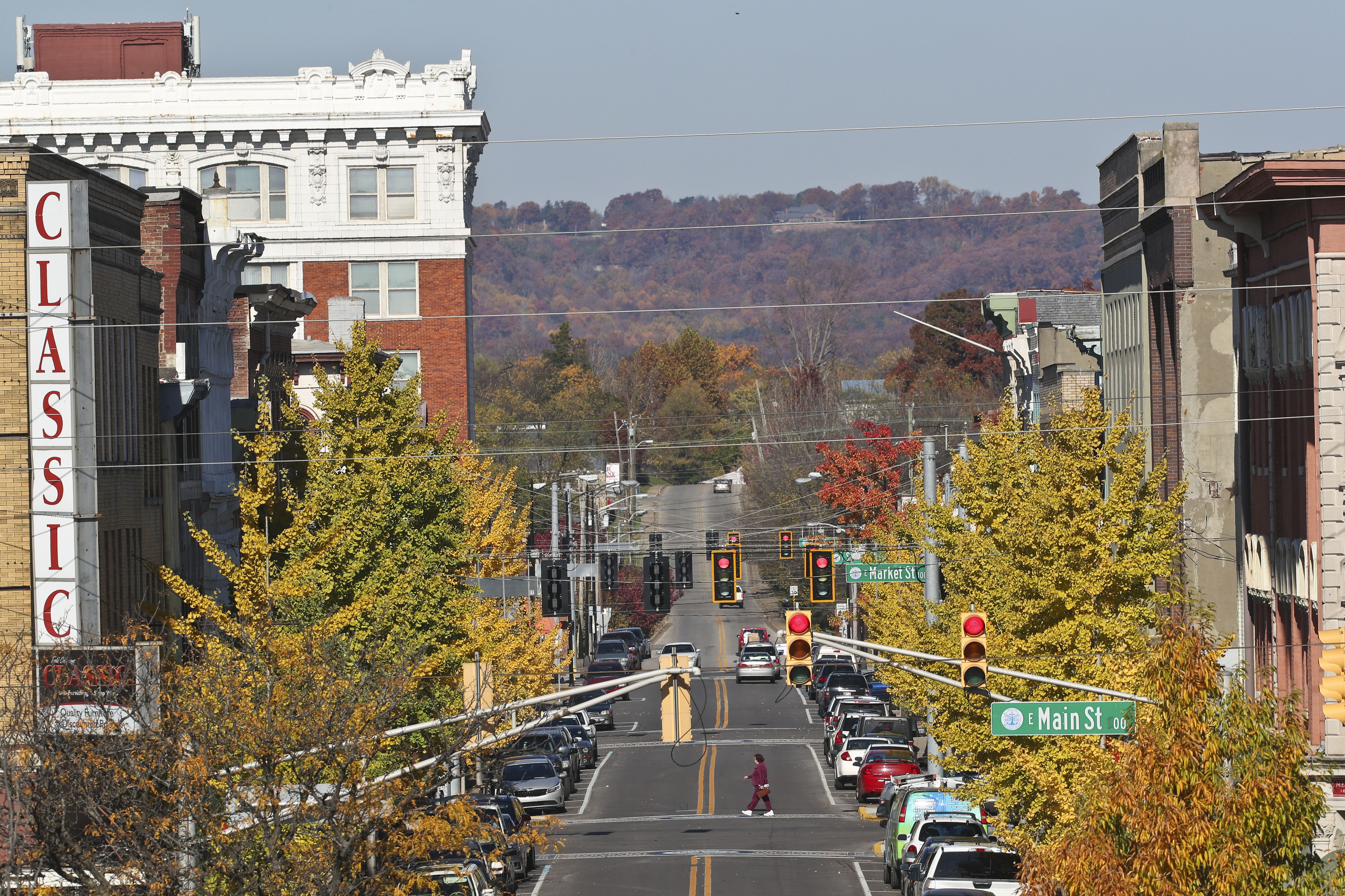
View of Pearl Street in Downtown New Albany

New Albany (/ˈɔːlbəni/) is a city in New Albany Township, Floyd County, Indiana, United States, situated along the Ohio River, opposite Louisville, Kentucky. The population was 37,841 as of the 2020 census. The city is the county seat of Floyd County. It is bounded by I-265 to the north and the Ohio River to the south, and is considered part of the Louisville metropolitan area. The mayor of New Albany is Jeff Gahan, a Democrat; he was re-elected in 2023.

== History ==
=== Early history ===
Historical population
Census	Pop.	Note	%±
1830	2,079		—
1840	4,226		103.3%
1850	8,181		93.6%
1860	12,647		54.6%
1870	15,396		21.7%
1880	16,423		6.7%
1890	21,059		28.2%
1900	20,628		−2.0%
1910	20,629		0.0%
1920	22,992		11.5%
1930	25,819		12.3%
1940	25,414		−1.6%
1950	29,346		15.5%
1960	37,812		28.8%
1970	38,402		1.6%
1980	37,103		−3.4%
1990	36,322		−2.1%
2000	37,603		3.5%
2010	36,372		−3.3%
2020	37,841		4.0%
Source: US Census Bureau

The land of New Albany was officially granted to the United States after the American Revolutionary War. The territory had been captured by George Rogers Clark in 1779. For his services Clark was awarded large tracts of land in Southern Indiana including most of Floyd County. After the war, Clark sold and distributed some of his land to his fellow soldiers. The area of New Albany ended up in the possession of Col. John Paul.

New Albany was founded in July 1813 when three brothers from New York —Joel, Abner, and Nathaniel Scribner—arrived at the Falls of the Ohio and named the site after the city of Albany, New York. They purchased the land from Col. John Paul. New Albany was platted by John Graham on land owned by the Scribner brothers. In 1814, Joel and Mary Scribner built their home in New Albany; the Scribner House still stands today.

New Albany was incorporated as a town in 1817 as part of Clark County. In 1819, three years after Indiana was admitted as a state, New Albany became the seat of government for newly established Floyd County. A courthouse was finally built in 1824.

New Albany grew rapidly and was the largest city in Indiana from 1816 until 1860, when it was overtaken by Indianapolis. Before the Civil War, over half of Hoosiers worth over $100,000 (~$1.74 million in 2024) lived in New Albany, making it by far the wealthiest part of the state. The steamboat industry was the engine of the city's economy during the mid-19th century. Fueled by abundant forests for lumber, at least a half-dozen shipbuilders were in operation and turned out a multitude of steamboats and packet boats, including the Robert E. Lee, Eliza Battle, the Eclipse, and the A.A. Shotwell. Shipbuilding was accompanied by a wide range of ancillary business including machine shops, foundries, cabinet and furniture factories, and silversmith shops. Its second-largest business was the American Plate Glass Works.

In 1847, the city was connected to the port at Michigan City, Indiana on Lake Michigan via the Monon railroad. In 1853, the New Albany High School opened, the first public high school in the state. The original school was built at the corner of West First Street and Spring Street. New Albany would also be the first in the state to create a consolidated school district several years later.

Ashbel P. Willard, governor of the state of Indiana, dedicated the Floyd County Fairgrounds in 1859. That year, the Indiana State Fair was held in New Albany. During the Civil War, the fairgrounds were converted to become Camp Noble and used as a muster point for the area's regiments.

=== Civil War ===
During the American Civil War, New Albany served as both a supply center for Union troops and as a medical care center for wounded soldiers. Up to 1,500 wounded soldiers were treated in New Albany during the war, and many non-medical buildings were converted into makeshift hospitals. In 1862, Abraham Lincoln established one of the first seven national cemeteries in New Albany for burying the many war dead. Despite the ongoing war, a new courthouse was built in 1865, which was used until the 1960s, when the current City-County courthouse was constructed, also the first in Indiana.

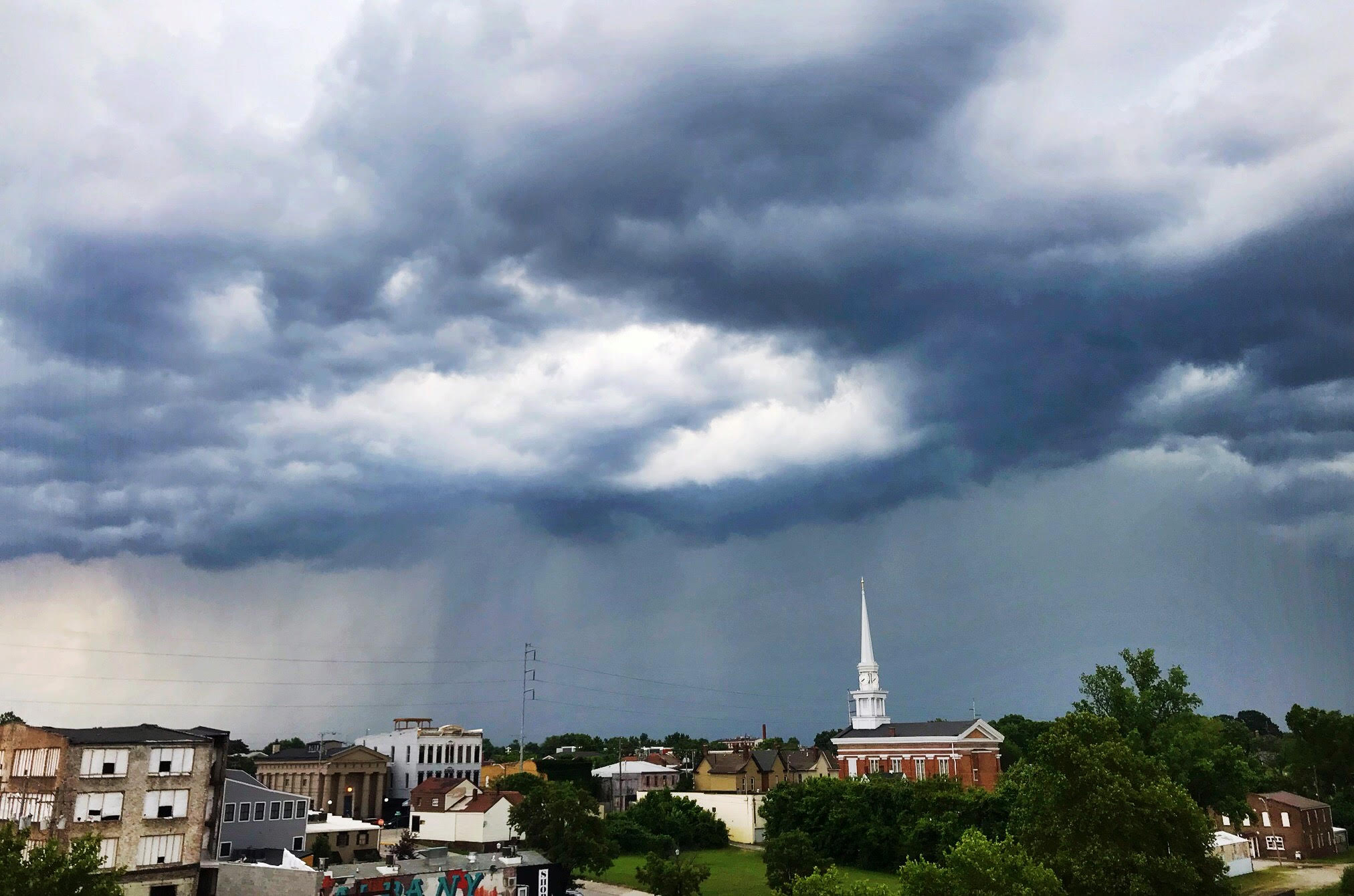
Downtown New Albany The 160 feet tall Town Clock Church was built in 1852 as a stop on the Underground Railroad.

The Town Clock Church, now the Second Baptist Church, was used as the New Albany stop in the Underground Railroad. The original steeple was destroyed by a lightning strike in 1915, and a new replica steeple was not completed until 101 years later in 2016.

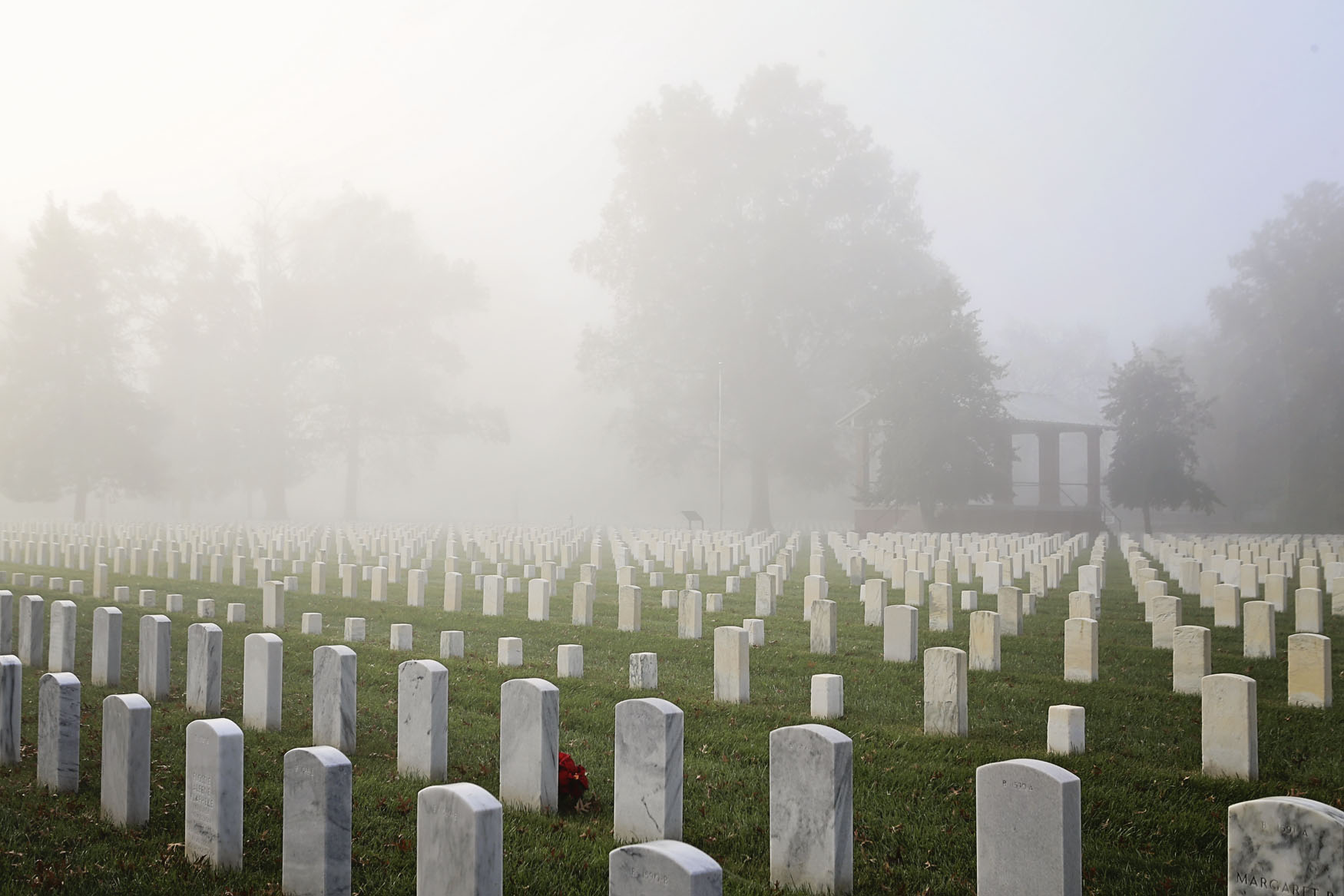
New Albany National Cemetery opened in 1862

During the Civil War, New Albany businesses were boycotted by Confederates because it was in a Union state and by the North because it was considered too friendly to the South. Indianapolis overtook New Albany as Indiana's largest city in 1860, and across the river, Louisville's population grew much faster. New Albany never regained its original stature. The once robust steamboat industry ended by 1870, with the last steamboat built in New Albany named, appropriately, the Robert E. Lee.

During the second half of the 19th century, New Albany experienced an industrial boom despite the collapse of the steamboat industry. The advent of railroads created economic opportunity for the city as a pork packing and locomotive repair center. A bridge was built across the Ohio River in 1886, providing a rail and road connection with Kentucky. American Plate Glass Works opened in 1865 and employed as many as 2,000 workers. When the factory relocated in 1893, New Albany lost a large part of its population and went into economic decline.

=== 20th century ===
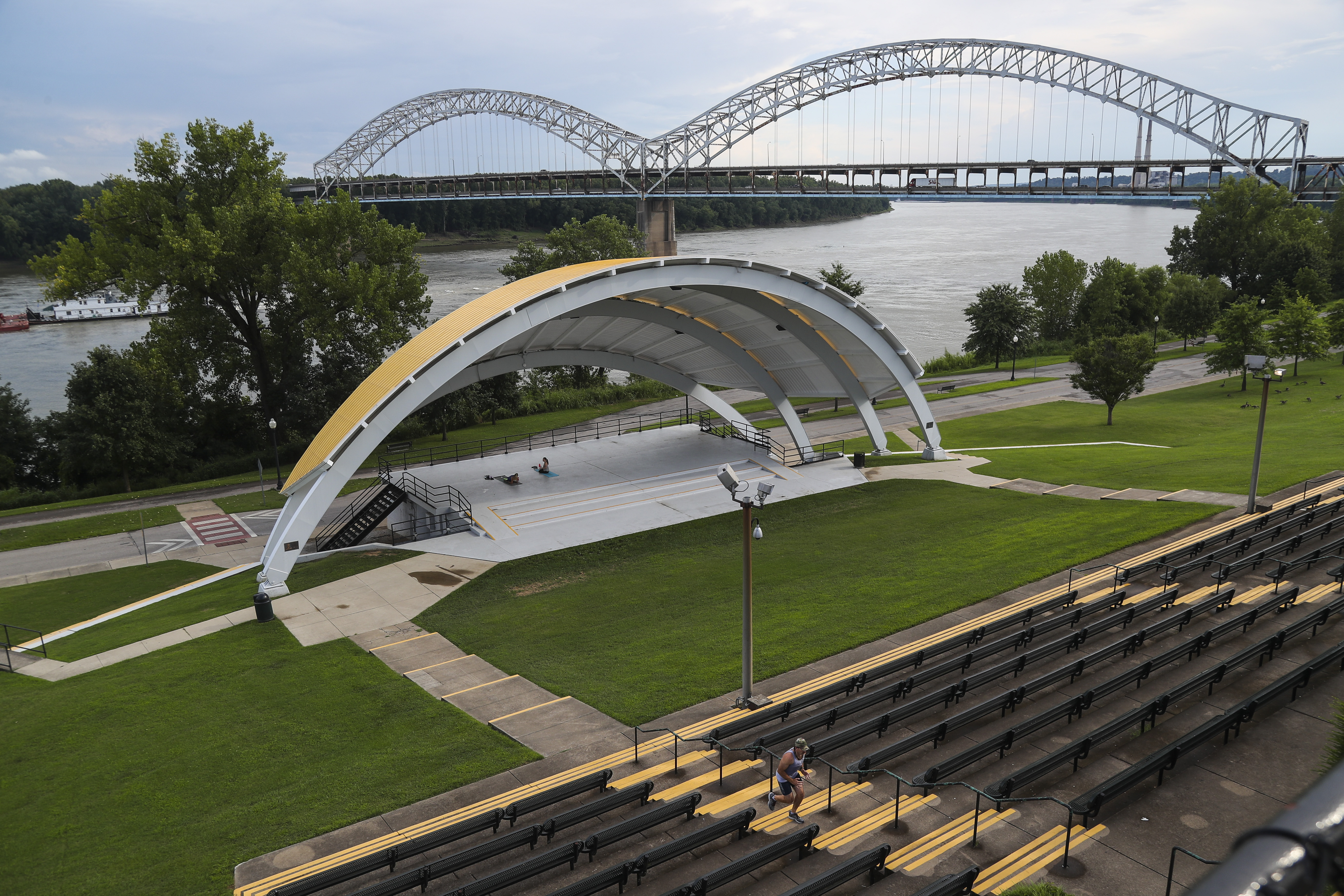
New Albany Riverfront with Sherman Minton Bridge

In the early 20th century, New Albany became a center of plywood and veneer manufacturing, and its largest employer was the New Albany Veneering Company. By 1920, New Albany was the largest producer of plywood and veneer in the world, with other producers including Indiana Veneer Panel Company and Hoosier Panel Company.

On March 23, 1917, a tornado struck the north side of New Albany, killing at least 46 people.

Interstate 64 was built through New Albany in 1961 and led to the construction of the Sherman Minton Bridge. The project cost $14.8 million. The bridge was named for U.S. Senator and later U.S. Supreme Court Justice Sherman Minton, who was a native of nearby Georgetown and practiced law in New Albany. The bridge was named the "most beautiful long-span bridge of 1961" by the American Institute of Steel Construction.

==== Education innovation ====
Charles A. Prosser lived in New Albany for much of his life. Charles Allen Prosser School of Technology was named in honor of his accomplishments as the "father of vocational education." In the mid and late 20th century, New Albany became an innovator in using electronic media in education. New Albany High School, a public school, started WNAS-FM in 1949, which is the nation's oldest continuously operating high school radio station. In the late 1960s, Slate Run Elementary School started WSRS, a non-licensed student-produced closed-circuit television service for its classrooms, one of the nation's first in an elementary school.

==== Ohio River flood ====
In January 1937, a major flood struck the region. New Albany, like the other river towns, had no flood walls and no methods of regulating the river. The Ohio River rose to 60.8 feet at New Albany, leaving most of the town under 10 or more feet of water for nearly three weeks. The flood was the worst disaster to befall the city.

After the flood, New Albany was the first city in the region to begin construction on massive flood walls around the city. New Albany's flood walls served as examples for those constructed around Louisville and Clark County.

== Geography ==
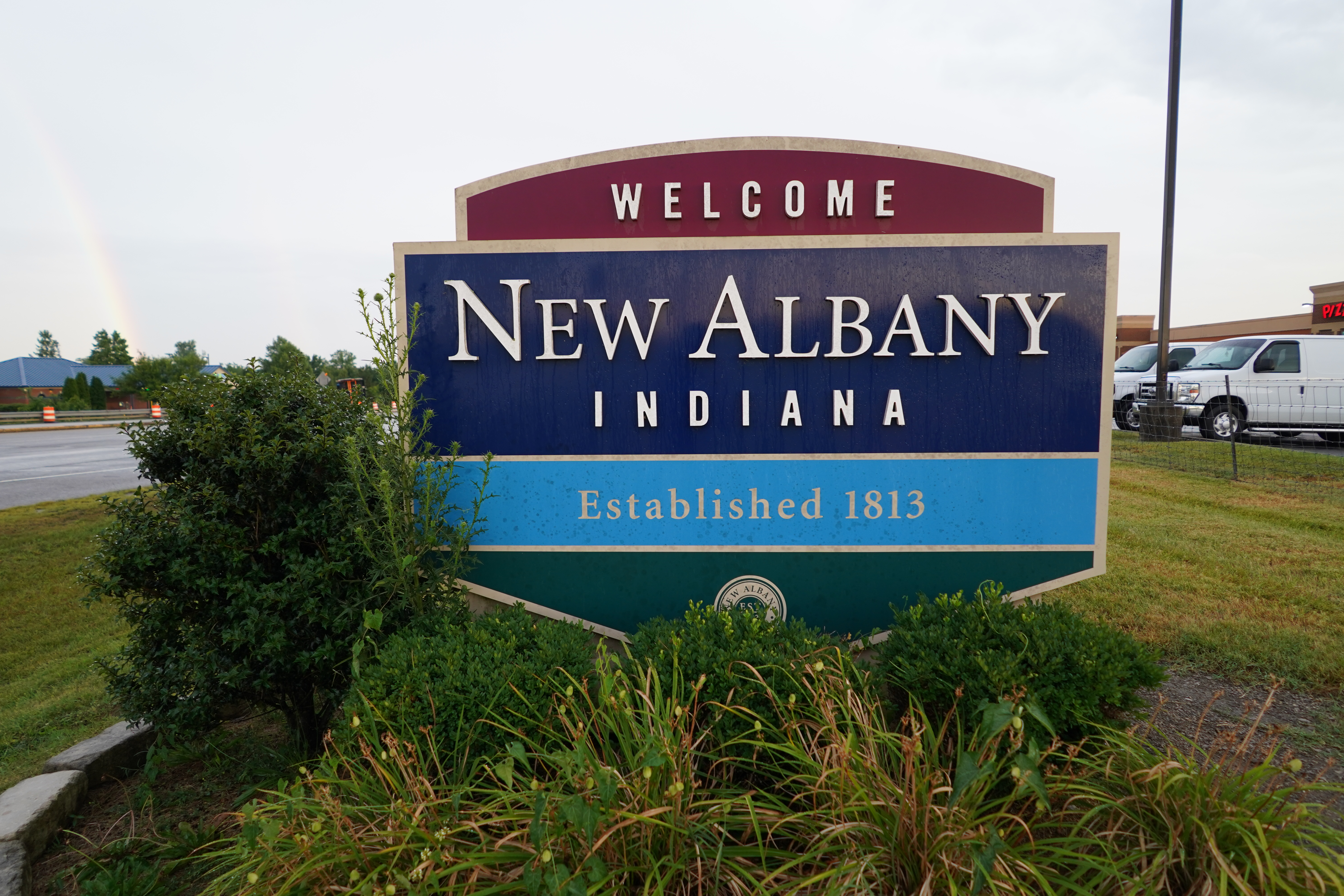
New Albany Welcome Sign

New Albany is located at 38°18′07″N 85°49′17″W (38.301935, −85.821442).

According to the 2010 census, New Albany has a total area of 15.111 square miles (39.14 km^{2}), of which 14.94 square miles (38.69 km^{2}) (or 98.87%) is land and 0.171 square miles (0.44 km^{2}) (or 1.13%) is water.

== Demographics ==
=== 2020 census ===
As of the 2020 census, New Albany had a population of 37,841. The median age was 37.7 years. 21.1% of residents were under the age of 18 and 17.5% of residents were 65 years of age or older. For every 100 females there were 92.2 males, and for every 100 females age 18 and over there were 89.2 males age 18 and over.

99.9% of residents lived in urban areas, while 0.1% lived in rural areas.

There were 16,441 households in New Albany, of which 26.1% had children under the age of 18 living in them. Of all households, 32.6% were married-couple households, 23.2% were households with a male householder and no spouse or partner present, and 34.8% were households with a female householder and no spouse or partner present. About 36.1% of all households were made up of individuals and 12.9% had someone living alone who was 65 years of age or older.

There were 17,983 housing units, of which 8.6% were vacant. The homeowner vacancy rate was 1.8% and the rental vacancy rate was 6.9%.

Racial composition as of the 2020 census
Race	Number	Percent
White	30,027	79.4%
Black or African American	3,463	9.2%
American Indian and Alaska Native	174	0.5%
Asian	348	0.9%
Native Hawaiian and Other Pacific Islander	7	0.0%
Some other race	923	2.4%
Two or more races	2,899	7.7%
Hispanic or Latino (of any race)	1,925	5.1%

=== 2023 American Community Survey ===
According to the 2023 American Community Survey, the median household income in New Albany was $54,152, compared to the Indiana state average of $69,477. According to the same survey, 18.4% of the population in New Albany lived below the poverty line, compared to 12.3% of Indiana as a whole.

=== 2010 census ===
As of the census of 2010, there were 36,372 people, 15,575 households, and 9,175 families living in the city. The population density was 2,434.5 inhabitants per square mile (940.0/km^{2}). There were 17,315 housing units at an average density of 1,159.0 per square mile (447.5/km^{2}). The racial makeup of the city was 85.8% White, 8.7% African American, 0.2% Native American, 0.7% Asian, 1.7% from other races, and 2.9% from two or more races. Hispanic or Latino of any race were 3.7% of the population.

There were 15,575 households, of which 29.9% had children under the age of 18 living with them, 35.4% were married couples living together, 18.2% had a female householder with no husband present, 5.2% had a male householder with no wife present, and 41.1% were non-families. 33.7% of all households were made up of individuals, and 11.1% had someone living alone who was 65 years of age or older. The average household size was 2.27 and the average family size was 2.89.

The median age in the city was 37.1 years. 22.9% of residents were under the age of 18; 10.1% were between the ages of 18 and 24; 26.9% were from 25 to 44; 26.4% were from 45 to 64; and 13.9% were 65 years of age or older. The gender makeup of the city was 47.5% male and 52.5% female.

=== 2000 census ===
As of the census of 2000, there were 37,603 people, 15,959 households, and 10,054 families living in the city. The population density was 2,571.1 inhabitants per square mile (992.7/km^{2}). There were 17,098 housing units at an average density of 1,169.1 per square mile (451.4/km^{2}). The racial makeup of the city was 84.00% White, 12.93% African American, 0.31% Native American, 0.42% Asian, 0.04% Pacific Islander, 0.67% from other races, and 1.62% from two or more races. 1.36% of the population is Hispanic (Hispanics can be of any race).

There were 15,959 households, out of which 29.6% had children under the age of 18 living with them, 42.5% were married couples living together, 16.1% had a female householder with no husband present, and 37.0% were non-families. 30.8% of all households were made up of individuals, and 11.7% had someone living alone who was 65 years of age or older. The average household size was 2.31 and the average family size was 2.88.

In the city, the population was spread out, with 24.0% under the age of 18, 9.6% from 18 to 24, 29.2% from 25 to 44, 21.8% from 45 to 64, and 15.4% who were 65 years of age or older. The median age was 37 years. For every 100 females, there were 88.5 males. For every 100 females age 18 and over, there were 84.6 males.

The median income for a household in the city was $34,923, and the median income for a family was $41,993. Males had a median income of $31,778 versus $24,002 for females. The per capita income for the city was $18,365. About 11.4% of families and 13.7% of the population were below the Poverty threshold, including 21.6% of those under age 18 and 9.1% of those age 65 or over.

== Attractions ==
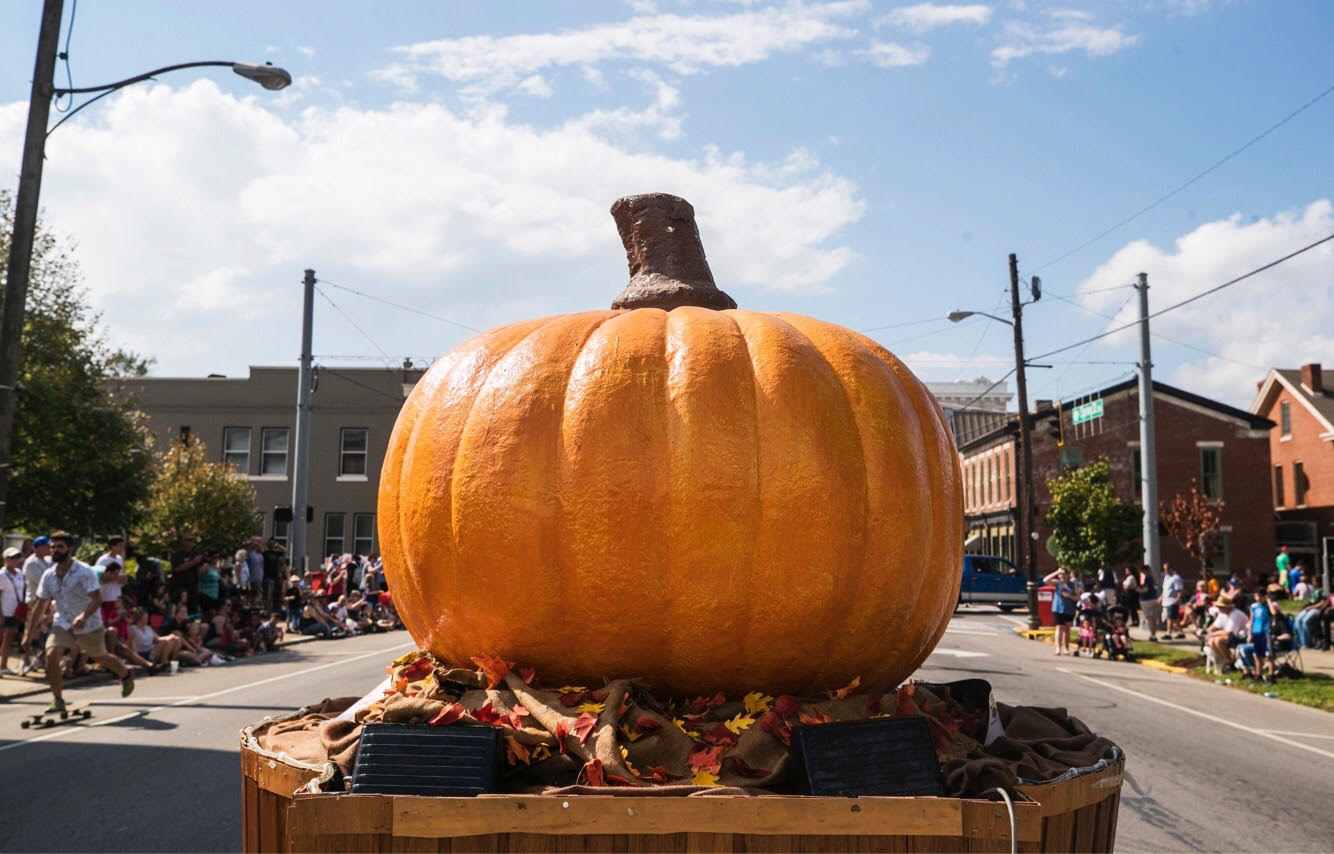
Harvest Homecoming 2018

New Albany's Main Street features a large collection of late 19th century mansions from the city's heyday as a shipbuilding center. The centerpiece is the Culbertson Mansion, a three-story French Second Empire Style structure, which is today an Indiana state memorial.

Every October, New Albany hosts the Harvest Homecoming festival, one of the largest annual events in the state. Festivities begin on the first weekend of October, but the main part, consisting of midway rides, shows, and booths lining the downtown streets, lasts from Thursday-Sunday of the second weekend in October. The 2020 Harvest Homecoming was cancelled due to the coronavirus pandemic.

== Education ==
Indiana University Southeast, one of the eight campuses of the Indiana University system, is located on the northern edge of the city. The Purdue Polytechnic Institute also maintains a satellite campus in the city.

New Albany-Floyd County Consolidated School Corporation operates public schools. The Children's Academy of New Albany is the public preschool program.

Elementary schools in the city limits include:

- Fairmont Elementary School
- Green Valley Elementary School
- Mount Tabor Elementary School
- S. Ellen Jones Elementary School
- Slate Run Elementary School

Grant Line Elementary School is in an unincorporated area near New Albany.

Middle schools in the city limits include:

- Hazelwood Middle School
- Nathaniel Scribner Middle School.

New Albany High School is the city's senior high school with the city being in its attendance boundary.

The Greater Louisville Regional Japanese Saturday School (グレータールイビル日本語補習校 Gurētā Ruibiru Nihongo Hoshūkō), a Japanese weekend supplementary school, is affiliated with IUS's Japan Center. It was established in January 1988 and holds its classes at Hillside Hall; its office is elsewhere in New Albany.

The city has a free lending library, the New Albany-Floyd County Public Library.

== Notable people ==
- Jamey Aebersold – jazz musician, publisher of "play-along" music books
- William Wallace Atterbury (1866–1935) – Brigadier General in the U.S. Army during World War I
- Carl Braden – Civil Rights activist
- Pomeroy Cannon – physician, stage and film actor
- William Cochran – Indiana state legislator and businessman
- Angelina Maria Collins – author of the first cookbook published in Indiana
- Rob Conway – pro wrestler
- Josh Dallas – actor who was born in Louisville, Kentucky, but went to New Albany High School
- Cheri Herman Daniels (born 1950) – First Lady of Indiana from 2005 to 2013
- Aubrey Hampton (1934–2011) – biochemist and writer
- Billy Herman (1909–1992) – infielder in Major League Baseball during 1930s and 1940s, member of Major League Baseball's Hall of Fame
- Bernard Hock – table tennis racket pioneer; twice National (US) Seniors Table Tennis Doubles Champion, 6-time Indiana Table Tennis Senior Champion
- Houndmouth – American alternative blues band
- Edwin Hubble – astronomer and namesake of Hubble Space Telescope
- Ferdinand N. Kahler (1864–1927) – inventor, entrepreneur and automobile pioneer
- Karen Kamensek – Grammy nominated orchestral and operatic conductor
- J. Warren Kerrigan – actor, was born in New Albany
- Charles M. La Follette – member of Congress, was born in New Albany
- Romeo Langford – professional basketball player
- David Lerchey (1937–2005) – US Air Force veteran and 2nd tenor/baritone singer for doo-wop group, The Del-Vikings
- John MacLeod – college and pro basketball coach
- Max Macon – Major League Baseball pitcher/first baseman and scout
- George W. Maher – early 20th Century Prairie School style architect
- Jouett Meekin – Major League Baseball pitcher who won 153 games
- Sherman Minton – United States Supreme Court Justice who ruled in the landmark Brown v. Board of Education case in 1954.
- Rondale Moore (2000–2026) – football player
- Lucy Higgs Nichols (1838–1915) – escaped slave and Civil War nurse
- Robert Ivan Nichols (1926–2002) – identity thief
- Charles Allen Prosser – the father of vocational education
- Craig Pumphrey – police officer, television presenter and martial artist
- Dusty Ray Bottoms (Dustin Rayburn) – drag queen and musical artist
- Joseph Ritter – Roman Catholic archbishop and Cardinal
- David H. Rodgers – Mayor of Spokane, Washington
- Roscoe Sarles – Indy Car driver
- Shanda Sharer (1979–1992) – twelve-year-old torture murder victim
- Thomas Smith – Justice of the Indiana Supreme Court
- Mike Sodrel – former congressman of Indiana's 9th district
- Evan B. Stotsenburg – President Pro Tempore of the Indiana Senate; Indiana Attorney General (1915–1917)
- John M. Stotsenburg – U.S. Army colonel killed in Philippine–American War
- Laura M. Hawley Thurston (1812–1842) – poet, teacher
- Camille Wright Thompson – silver medalist in swimming at 1976 Summer Olympics in Montreal
- S. C. Thompson – editor
- Ashbel P. Willard – 11th Governor of Indiana
- Fuzzy Zoeller – PGA golfer with 20 tour victories

== See also ==
- List of mayors of New Albany, Indiana
- List of cities and towns along the Ohio River
- New Albany High School
- Indiana University Southeast
