= Kentucky & Indiana Terminal Bridge =

Railroad bridge over the Ohio River from Louisville, KY to New Albany, IN

Kentucky & Indiana Bridge
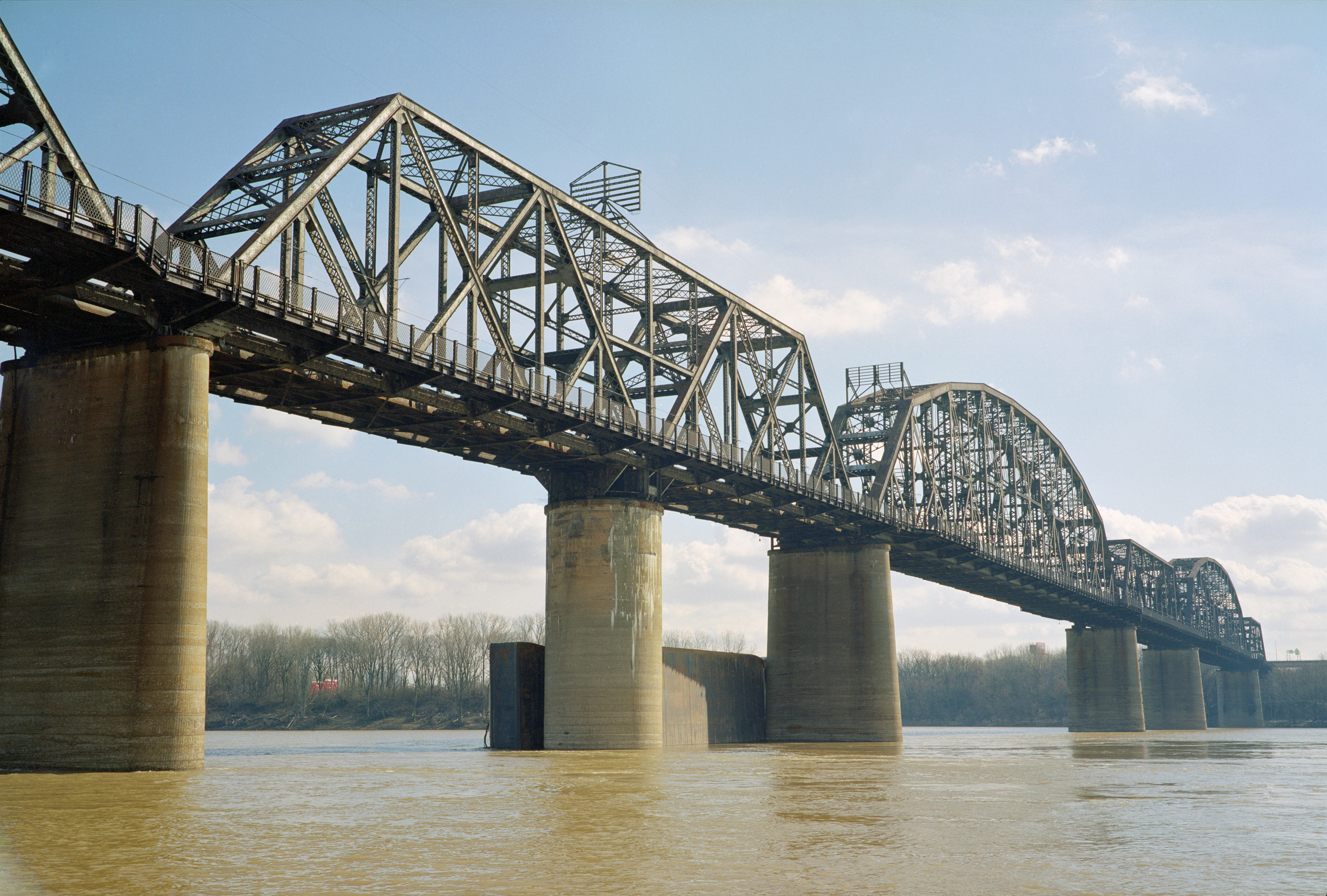
- The bridge seen from the Indiana side in 2006
- Coordinates: 38°16′58.21″N 85°48′5.83″W
- Crosses: Ohio River
- Locale: Louisville, Kentucky and New Albany, Indiana
- Maintained by: Norfolk Southern Railway

Characteristics
- Total length: 6,000 ft (1,830 m)
- Width: 70 ft (21 m)

History
- Opened: 1912 (current bridge); 1885 (original bridge)

Location
- Interactive map of Kentucky & Indiana Bridge

The Kentucky & Indiana Bridge (K&I Bridge) is one of the first multimodal bridges to cross the Ohio River. It was designed for both railway and roadway purposes, although the roadway has been closed since 1979. The K&I Bridge connects Louisville, Kentucky, to New Albany, Indiana.

Constructed from 1881 to 1885 by the Kentucky and Indiana Bridge Company, the original K&I Bridge opened in 1886. Federal, state, and local law state that railway, streetcar, wagon-way, and pedestrian modes of travel were intended by the cities of New Albany and Louisville, the states of Kentucky and Indiana, the United States Congress, and the bridge owners. It included a single standard gauge track and two wagon ways, allowing wagons and other animal powered vehicles to cross the Ohio River by a method other than ferry for the first time. At that time, motorized vehicles were virtually nonexistent. The K&I Bridge company also owned a ferry boat operation during both the first and second bridge; eventually that operation was sold as the bridge's success largely outmoded boat usage.

== Original bridge ==
=== Design ===
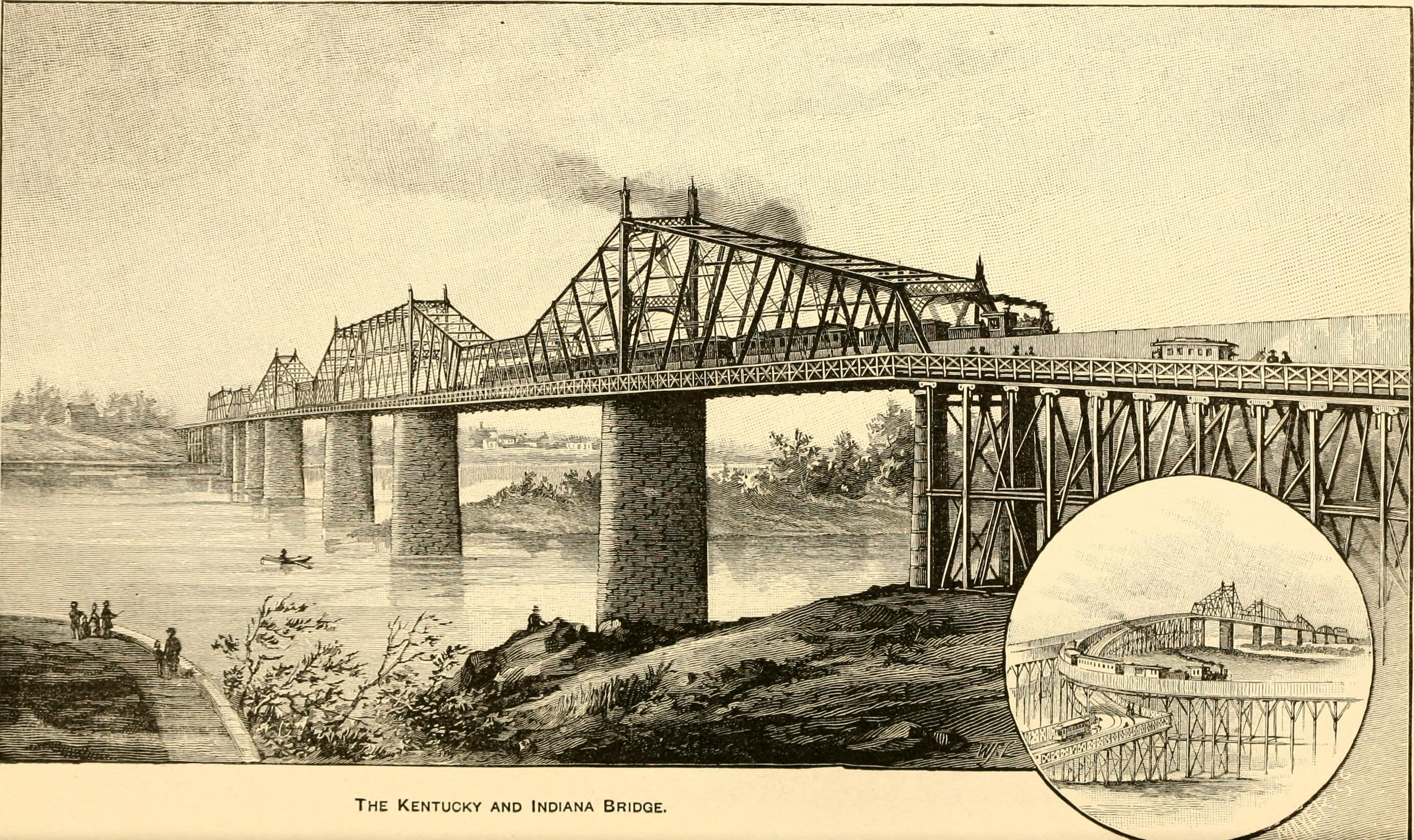
An 1886 drawing of the original bridge

The Kentucky & Indiana Bridge, which spans the Ohio River at the Falls of the Ohio, was designed to connect the cities of New Albany, Indiana and Louisville, Kentucky, and to bring their residents closer together. Citizens of New Albany and Louisville who conceived the bridge described its purpose in the Articles of Association for the Kentucky and Indiana Bridge Company filed with the recorder of Floyd County, Indiana, on March 7, 1881. The bridge founders declared that the object and purpose of the company was to construct, own, and operate a bridge from a point in the city of New Albany across the Ohio River to a point in the city of Louisville for both railway and common roadway purposes together. The bridge and its approaches cost $1,500,000.

The alignment of the K&I is along America's ancient roads known as the Great Buffalo Trace and Wilderness Road. People have crossed at the limestone and coral rapids for 8,000 years. This strategic location has the only waterfall cascade on the 1,000-mile (1,600 km) Ohio and Mississippi River. In Louisville, this route offered the most rapid connection to U.S. Route 150 or Dixie Highway heading southwest and Lexington Road heading southwest. In Indiana the road follows the original route of the Buffalo Trace between Vincennes and New Albany. Each level of government, federal, state, and city, preserved its right of way and established speed limits across the bridge. In doing that, Louisville city leaders also mandated that the purpose of the bridge was for four modes of transportation: railroad, streetcar, vehicle, and pedestrian purposes. The city of Louisville and Federal Government also declared the K&I Bridge a postal route and retained its right of way in perpetuity.

Designer Mace Moulton, a member of the American Society of Civil Engineers, highlighted the K&I Bridge design, which included safety innovations, at the National Conference of the American Society of Civil Engineers in 1887. He chose the Ohio River location in Louisville across the Falls of the Ohio, where it has the least width. This gave residents of New Albany and Louisville a shorter and independent entrance to their cities. The railroad track was placed in the center between two trusses with a roadway on the outside of each truss, supported on projecting brackets, and with sidewalks on either side of the railroad track and inside the main trusses. Designers used high visual screens along the roadway to calm horses and livestock and to keep drivers focused on the roadway and not distracted by trains. On both the Louisville and New Albany sides, the common roadway and railway tracks are grade separated or completely independent.

=== Operation ===
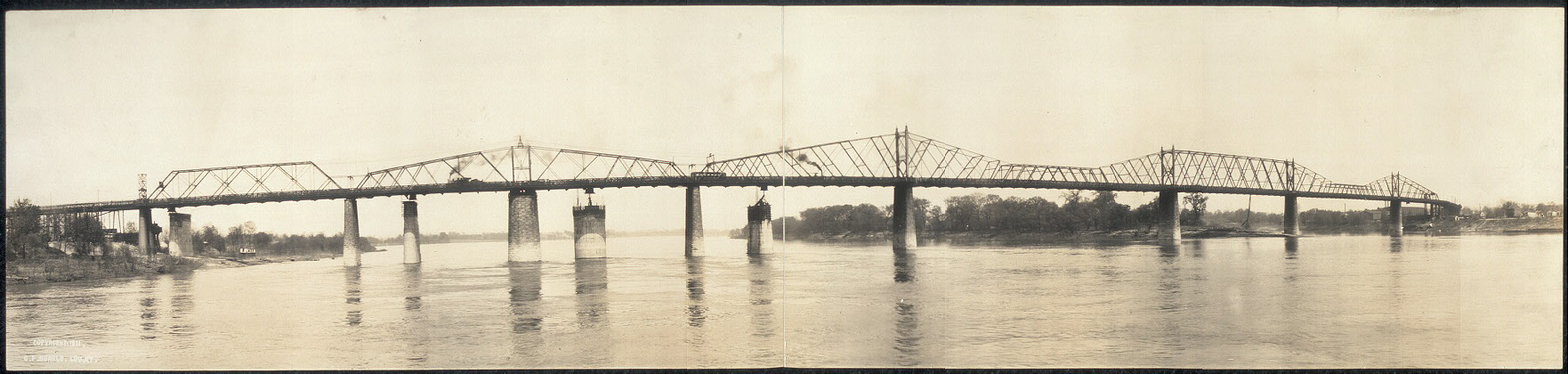
The original bridge during construction of the replacement bridge. Both a steam locomotive and a streetcar are seen crossing.

Publicity for the opening of the Kentucky and Indiana Bridge was substantial as even the Library of Congress joined in advertising the grand opening of the bridge. It wrote: "There is in the course of construction at this time (1885), and about completed, a bridge across the Ohio, between Louisville and New Albany, Indiana. The bridge at Louisville is to have a railroad track, a passageway for the vehicles, streetcars, and a walk-way for foot passengers."

Kentucky & Indiana Bridge had a remarkable safety rating. Experts at the time ranked it among the safest of any major bridge in the United States. This was due to the narrow roadway lanes that induced slow driving speed and grade-separated crossings that kept the trains and roads on different vertical elevations where the road and rail routes crossed. The K&I Bridge Board of Directors reported, "The common roadway has been operated with remarkable freedom from accidents. The few that have occurred have been of trivial character with no loss of life or limb to any person."

==== Light rail ====
Upon opening, the bridge company also offered the Daisy Line, an early steam locomotive commuter train service. In 1893, the Daisy Line trains became electrified, the first steam to electric conversion in the U.S. Passengers traveled in multi-unit three-car elevated electric trains from 1st, 4th, and 7th Street elevated stations and other stations en route between Louisville and New Albany. This rapid transit service was wildly popular, with its 15-minute service and convenient schedules, ridership soared from day one. By 1906, a ridership survey found 3,425 commuter passengers crossing daily and 1,250,000 passengers per year, crossing the K&I Bridge on these rapid electric trains. Even by modern standards this would be considered a heavily used line.

Expenditures for replacing wooden bridge railings and retrofitting the west Louisville wooden elevated segments with steel resulted in receivership for the Kentucky and Indiana Bridge Company. The company reorganized in 1899 as the Kentucky and Indiana Bridge and Railroad Company. There was no interruption of the electric commuter train or other bridge heavy rail, line hauled freight and passenger trains.

In late 1907, the new company sold its commuter train equipment to another company, completely exiting the commuter rail business. By spring of 1908, the elevated line in west Louisville, the downtown Louisville elevated trackage and elevated stations were no longer used.

In March 1908, the new operator changed all of the equipment gauge, making crossings via a broad gauge gauntlet track over the bridge, with a down ramp immediately afterward, to connect to Louisville's 5 ft (1,524 mm) gauge streetcar tracks. The 1908 version of service was essentially converted to trolleys including single car runs, but two car trains were retained for rush hour to meet the heavy patronage and ridership expectations built up over the decades.

== Current bridge ==
=== Construction ===
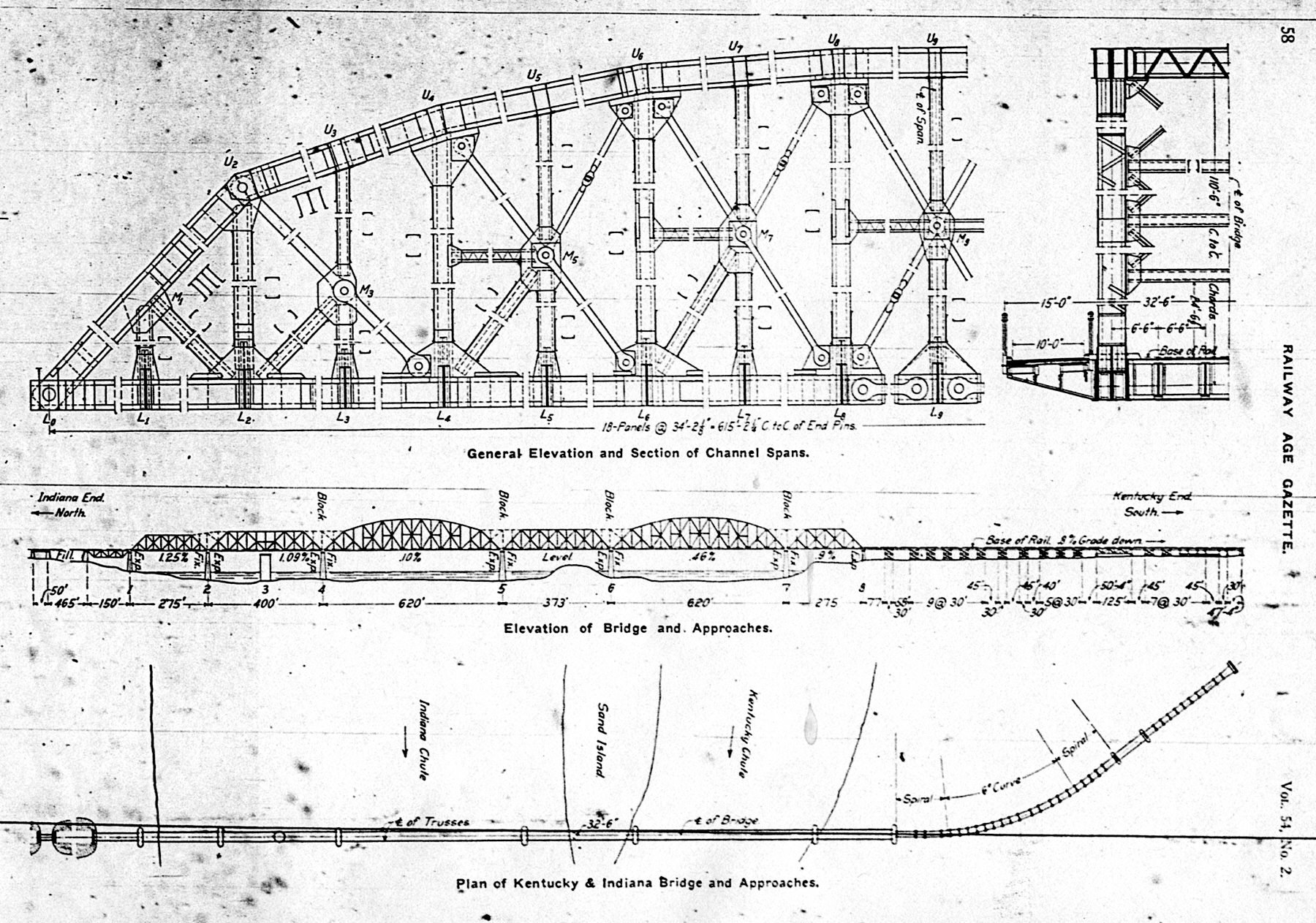
Engineering drawing of the new bridge

In 1910, the bridge company was renamed the Kentucky & Indiana Terminal Railroad Co. From 1910 to 1912, a new, heavier bridge was built on new piers just upstream from the original one, after which the old bridge was demolished. The new bridge was double tracked to handle increasingly heavier train and now automobile traffic, eventually receiving the U.S. 31W designation.

The bridge also featured a rotating swing span opening for the passage of ships in high water. The bridge was opened only four times, twice for testing in 1913 and 1915, then in 1916 for the passage of the steamer Tarascon and in 1920 for passage of the Australian convict ship Success. In 1948, the company refused to open the span for passage of the steamer Gordon C. Greene, citing inconvenience and costs of cutting power and communication lines, an action for which K&I and LG&E both paid damages to that ship's company. In 1955, the K&I sought and received permission to permanently tie down the swing span from the U. S. Army Corps of Engineers. In 1952, creosoted wood block roadways of the second bridge were eliminated and replaced by a steel gridwork roadway.

=== Roadway closure ===
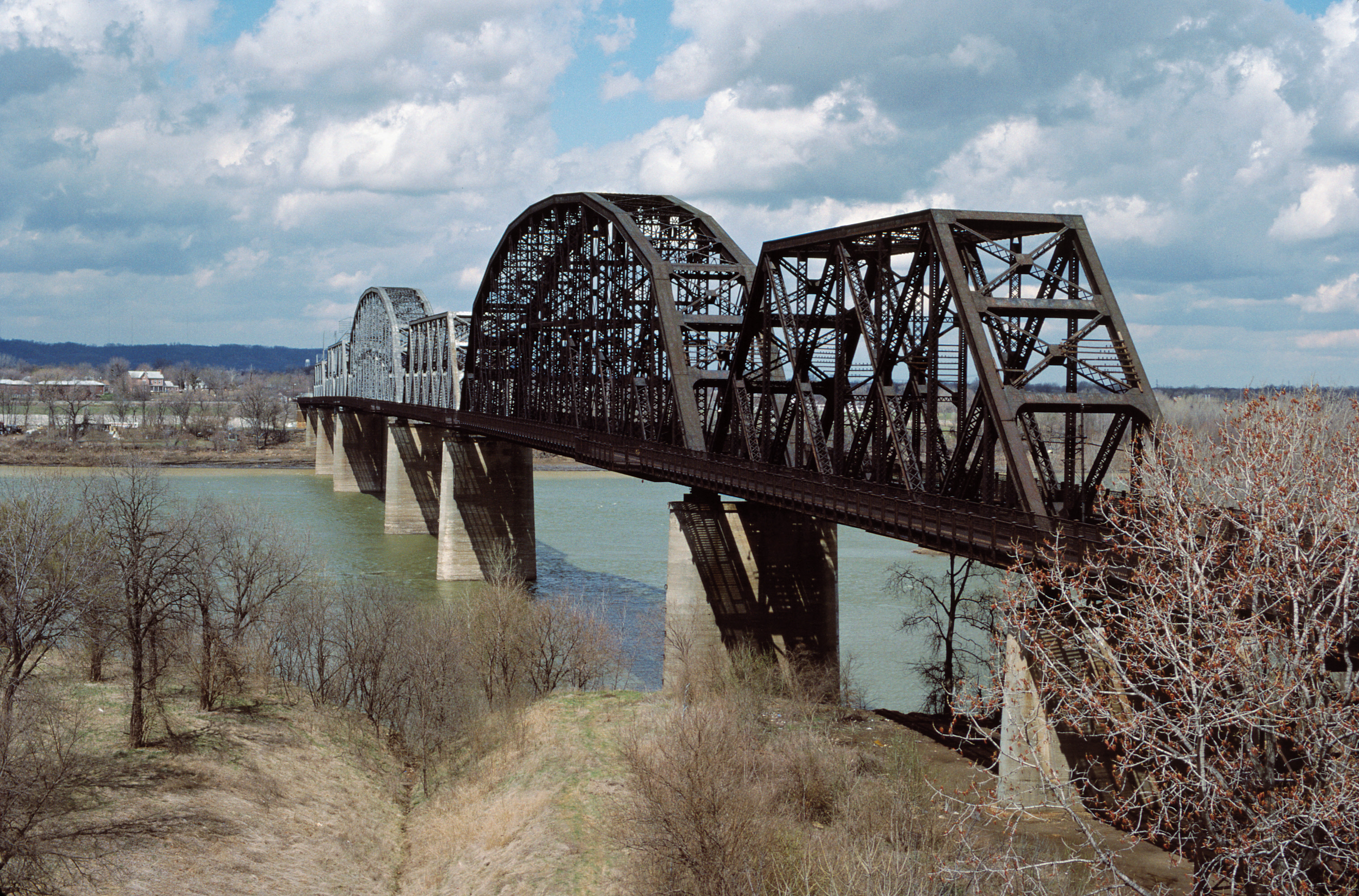
The bridge from the Kentucky side in 1988

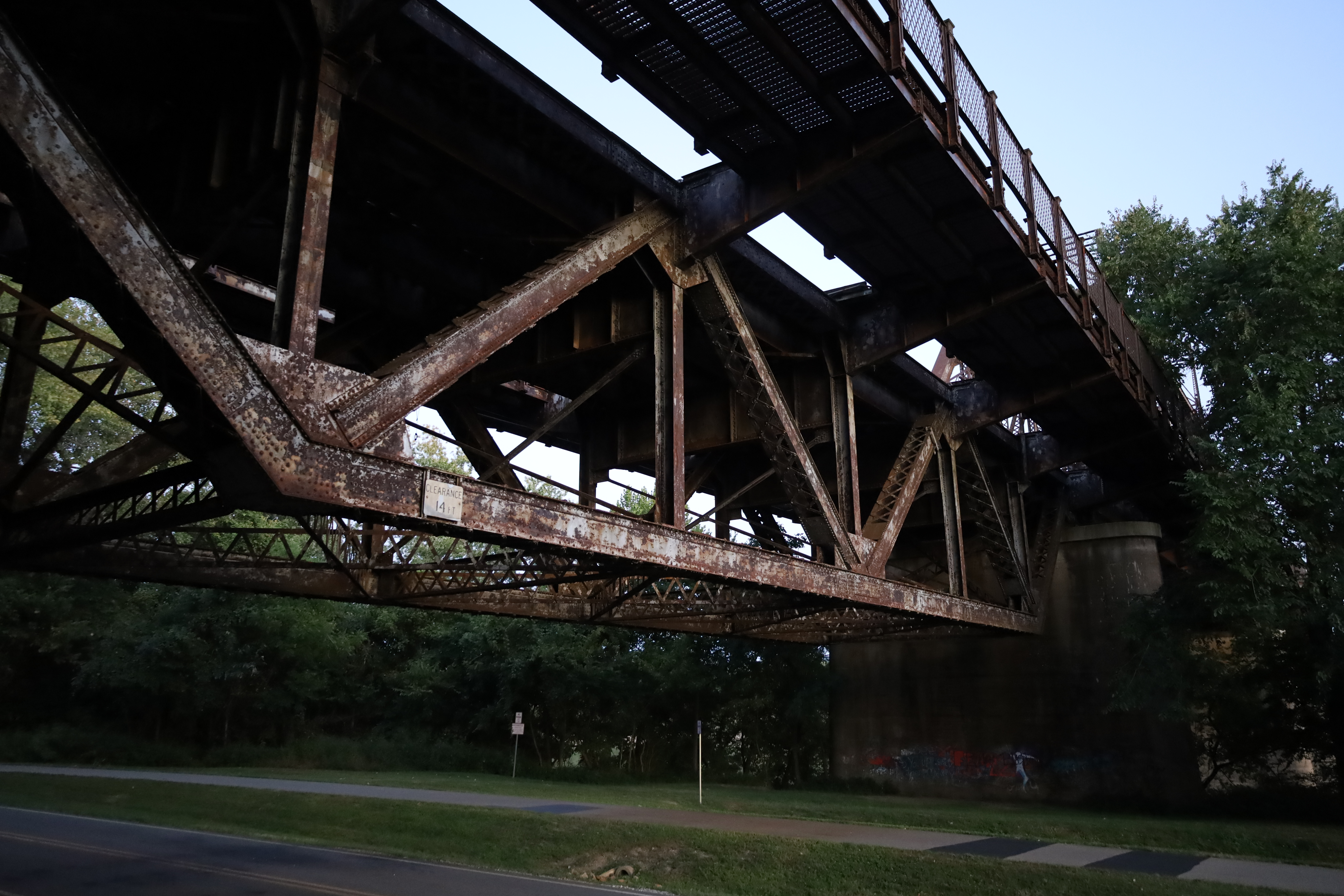
The last span on the Indiana side of the bridge in 2025, showing the roadways flanking the rail span

On February 1, 1979, an overweight dump truck caused a small segment of the steel grate roadway on the bridge to sag about 1 foot (0.30 m). A quick survey promised to reopen the roadway, but automotive traffic was banned thereafter by the railroad.

Since that time, various groups have sought to reopen the vehicle lanes, either for motor vehicles or for pedestrians. In 2011 and 2012, the nearby Sherman Minton Bridge was closed when inspectors found cracks in some of the primary load-bearing parts of the superstructure, leading to inquiries as to whether the K&I Bridge roadways could be reopened. The inquiries increased when news media saw trucks using the closed roadways. Norfolk Southern said that the trucks were used by their maintenance crews, and that the bridge is "unavailable for public use".

Proposals to turn the roadway lanes into pedestrian-only usage have also been rebuffed by Norfolk Southern, citing liability concerns. One proposal would include the K&I Bridge as part of a larger trail along the Ohio River, which would include the Big Four Bridge that was converted to pedestrian use between Louisville and Jeffersonville, Indiana.

=== Train fire ===
On June 30, 2014, a Norfolk Southern freight train crossing the bridge caught fire, closing the bridge for more than 17 hours and backing up traffic on NS lines as far away as Cincinnati, Ohio, and Somerset, Kentucky. The fire occurred in containers loaded with tea bags and children's toys. The fire was fought from both the bridge itself and from the river below the bridge. The train was eventually pulled off the bridge to fully contain the fire.

== See also ==
- List of crossings of the Ohio River
