= List of Washington (state) railroads =

The following railroads operate in the U.S. state of Washington.

== Common freight carriers ==
- Ballard Terminal Railroad (BDTL)
- BNSF Railway (BNSF)
- Cascade & Columbia River Railroad (CSCD) (GWRR)
- Central Washington Railroad (CWRR) (CBRW)
- Columbia Basin Railroad (CBRW)
- Columbia and Cowlitz Railway (CLC) (PATR)
- Columbia Walla Walla Railroad (CWW) (FTRX)
- Eastside Freight Railroad (EFRX) (BDTL)
- Frontier Rail (FTRX)
- Great Northwest Railroad (GRNW) (WATX)
- Kennewick Terminal Railroad (KET) (FTRX)
- Kettle Falls International Railway (KFR)
- Meeker Southern Railroad (MSN) (BDTL)
- Mount Vernon Terminal Railway (MVT)
- Olympia and Belmore Railroad (OYLO) (GWRR)
- Palouse River and Coulee City Railroad (PCC) (WATX)
- Patriot Woods Railroad (PAWR) (PATR)
- Pend Oreille Valley Railroad (POVA)
- Portland Vancouver Junction Railroad (PVJR) operates Lewis and Clark Railway (LINC)
- Puget Sound and Pacific Railroad (PSAP) (GWRR)
- Rainier Rail (RANR) (FTRX)
- St. Paul & Pacific Northwest Railroad (STPP)
- Spokane, Spangle & Palouse Railway (SS&P)
- Tacoma Rail (TMBL, TRMW)
- Union Pacific Railroad (UP)
- Washington Eastern Railroad (WER)
- Washington Royal Line (WRL) (FTRX)

== Private freight carriers ==
- Greenbrier Rail Services
- Longview Switching Company
- United States Army (USAX)

== Passenger carriers ==
- Amtrak (AMTK)
- Chehalis–Centralia Railroad
- Chelatchie Prairie Railroad
- Lake Whatcom Railway
- Mt. Rainier Scenic Railroad
- Seattle Streetcar
- Snoqualmie Valley Railroad
- Sound Transit (Sounder, Tacoma Link, and Central Link)
- Yakima Electric Railway Museum

== Defunct railroads ==
Name	Mark	System (Note: This is one or more of the Class I railroads that the railroad became part of, if any.)	From	To	Successor	Notes
Bellingham Bay and British Columbia Railroad		MILW	1883	1912	Bellingham & Northern Railway	
*Bellingham International Railroad	BIRR	BNSF	1995			
Bellingham Bay and Eastern Railroad		NP	1891	1903	Northern Pacific Railway	
Bellingham and Northern Railway		MILW	1912	1918	Chicago, Milwaukee and St. Paul Railway	
Bellingham Terminals and Railway Company		MILW	1909	1912	Bellingham and Northern Railway	
Blakely Railroad			1896	1917	N/A	
Blue Mountain Railroad	BLMR		1992	1999	Palouse River and Coulee City Railroad	
BNSF Acquisition, Inc.			1996	2008	BNSF Railway, Columbia Basin Railroad	
Burlington Northern Inc.	BN		1970	1981	Burlington Northern Railroad	
Burlington Northern Railroad	BN		1981	1996	Burlington Northern and Santa Fe Railway	
Burlington Northern (Oregon–Washington) Inc.			1981	1985	Burlington Northern Railroad	
Camas Prairie RailNet	CSP		1998	2004	Great Northwest Railroad	
Camas Prairie Railroad	CSP	NP/ UP	1909	1998	Camas Prairie RailNet	
Cascades Railroad		UP	1859		N/A	
Central Washington Railroad		NP	1888	1898	Washington Central Railway	
Centralia Eastern Railroad		NP	1907	1917	Northern Pacific Railway	
Chehalis and Cowlitz Railway		GN/ MILW/ NP/ UP	1911	1916	Cowlitz, Chehalis and Cascade Railway	
Chehalis Western Railroad			1980	1992	Tacoma Eastern Railway	
Chehalis Western Railroad			1936	1975	Curtis, Milburn and Eastern Railroad	
Chelatchie Prairie Railroad	CCPR		1981	1986	Lewis and Clark Railway	
Chicago, Milwaukee and Puget Sound Railway	CM&PS	MILW	12/31/1908	1/1/1913	Chicago, Milwaukee and St. Paul Railway	
Chicago, Milwaukee and St. Paul Railway		MILW	1912	1928	Chicago, Milwaukee, St. Paul and Pacific Railroad	
Chicago, Milwaukee and St. Paul Railway of Washington		MILW	1906	1909	Chicago, Milwaukee and Puget Sound Railway	
Chicago, Milwaukee, St. Paul and Pacific Railroad	MILW	MILW	1928	1980	Chehalis Western Railroad, Pend Oreille Valley Railroad, Seattle and North Coast Railroad	
Clealum Railroad		NP	1886	1898	Northern Pacific Railway	
Clearwater Short Line Railway		NP	1898	1914	Northern Pacific Railway	
Columbia Railway and Navigation Company		GN/ NP	1890	1902	Spokane, Portland and Seattle Railway	
Columbia and Palouse Railroad		UP	1882	1910	Oregon Railroad and Navigation Company	
Columbia and Puget Sound Railroad		GN	1880	1916	Pacific Coast Railroad	
Columbia and Red Mountain Railway		GN	1895	1907	Great Northern Railway	
Columbia River and Northern Railway		GN/ NP	1902	1908	Spokane, Portland and Seattle Railway	
Columbia Valley Railroad		UP	1899	1907	Ilwaco Railroad	
Connell Northern Railway		NP	1909	1914	Northern Pacific Railway	
Cowlitz, Chehalis and Cascade Railway		GN/ MILW/ NP/ UP	1916	1955	N/A	
Curtis, Milburn and Eastern Railroad	CMER		1973	1993	N/A	
Eastern-Washington Railroad		UP	1904		Spokane – Columbia River Railroad and Navigation Company	
Eastern Washington Railway		NP	1885	1886	Spokane and Palouse Railway	
Eastern Washington Gateway Railroad	EWG		2007	2018	Washington Eastern Railroad	
Eastside Railway		UP	1896	1914	Olympia Terminal Railway	
Everett and Cherry Valley Traction Company		GN	1907	1912	Great Northern Railway	
Everett and Monte Cristo Railway		NP	1892	1900	Monte Cristo Railway, Seattle and International Railway	
Fairhaven and Southern Railroad		GN	1888	1898	Seattle and Montana Railroad	
Farmers' Railway, Navigation and Steamboat Portage Company		GN/ NP	1885	1890	Farmers' Transportation Company	
Farmers' Transportation Company		GN/ NP	1890	1890	Columbia Railway and Navigation Company	
Grays Harbor and Puget Sound Railway		UP	1906	1910	Oregon and Washington Railroad	
Great Northern Railway	GN	GN	1890	1970	Burlington Northern Inc.	
Green River and Northern Railroad		NP	1890	1898	Northern Pacific Railway	
Hartford Eastern Railway	HE		1915	1933	N/A	
H and H Railroad			1904	1938		
Idaho and Washington Northern Railroad	I&WN	MILW	1907	1916	Chicago, Milwaukee and St. Paul Railway	
Idaho and Western Railway		MILW	1909	1912	Chicago, Milwaukee and Puget Sound Railway	
Ilwaco Railroad		UP	1907	1910	Oregon–Washington Railroad and Navigation Company	
Ilwaco Railway and Navigation Company		UP	1888	1907	Ilwaco Railroad	
Klickitat Northern Railroad			1914	1918	N/A	
Kootenai Valley Railway		GN	1898	1913	Great Northern Railway	
Lake Creek and Coeur d'Alene Railroad		UP	1906	1910	Oregon–Washington Railroad and Navigation Company	
Lewis and Clark Railway	LINC		1987	2004	Columbia Basin Railroad	
Longview, Portland and Northern Railway	LPN		1922	1981	Chelatchie Prairie Railroad	
Mason County Central Railroad			1889	1891	Shelton Southwestern Railroad	
Montana Rail Link	MRL	BNSF	10/31/1987	1/1/2024	BNSF	
Mill Creek Railroad		NP	1903	1905	Washington and Columbia River Railway	
Mill Creek Flume and Manufacturing Company		NP	1880	1903	Mill Creek Railroad	
Monte Cristo Railway		NP	1900	1903	Northern Pacific Railway	
Mud Bay Logging Company			1910	1943		
Newaukum Railroad			1914	1914	Newaukum Valley Railroad	
Newaukum Valley Railroad	NV		1914	1943	N/A	
North Coast Railroad	NCRR	UP	1906	1910	Oregon–Washington Railroad and Navigation Company	
North Coast Railway	NCRY	UP	1905	1906	North Coast Railroad	
North Yakima and Valley Railway		NP	1905	1914	Northern Pacific Railway	
Northern Pacific Railroad		NP	1864	1896	Northern Pacific Railway	
Northern Pacific Railway	NP	NP	1896	1970	Burlington Northern Inc.	
Northern Pacific and Cascade Railroad		NP	1884	1898	Northern Pacific Railway	
Northern Pacific and Puget Sound Shore Railroad		NP	1884	1898	Northern Pacific Railway	
Olympia Railroad Union		NP	1874	1877	Olympia and Chehalis Valley Railroad	
Olympia and Chehalis Valley Railroad		NP	1881	1891	Port Townsend Southern Railroad	
Olympia Southern Railway		MILW	1913	1913	Puget Sound and Willapa Harbor Railway	
Olympia Terminal Railway		MILW, UP	1911	1915	Oregon–Washington Railroad and Navigation Company, Puget Sound and Willapa Harbor Railway	
Oregon Railroad and Navigation Company		UP	1896	1910	Oregon–Washington Railroad and Navigation Company	
Oregon Railway Extensions Company		UP	1888	1896	Oregon Railroad and Navigation Company	
Oregon Railway and Navigation Company		UP	1879	1896	Oregon Railroad and Navigation Company	
Oregon Steam Navigation Company		UP	1860	1880	Oregon Railway and Navigation Company	
Oregon Short Line Railway		UP	1887	1889	Oregon Short Line and Utah Northern Railway	
Oregon Short Line and Utah Northern Railway		UP	1889	1896	N/A	Leased the Oregon Railway and Navigation Company
Oregon Trunk Railway	OT	GN/ NP	1909	1981	Burlington Northern (Oregon–Washington) Inc.	
Oregon and Washington Railroad		UP	1906	1910	Oregon–Washington Railroad and Navigation Company	
Oregon–Washington Railroad and Navigation Company	OWR&N	UP	1910	1987	Union Pacific Railroad	
Oregon, Washington and Idaho Railroad		UP	1903	1910	Oregon–Washington Railroad and Navigation Company	
Oregon and Washington Territory Railroad		NP	1886	1892	Washington and Columbia River Railway	
Pacific Railway		MILW	1905	1906	Chicago, Milwaukee and St. Paul Railway of Washington	
Pacific Coast Railroad	PC	GN	1916	1970	Burlington Northern Inc.	
Pacific and Eastern Railway		MILW	1906	1913	Puget Sound and Willapa Harbor Railway	
Port Angeles Western Railroad			1925	1950	N/A	
Port Ludlow, Port Angeles and Lake Crescent Railway		MILW	1911	1911	Seattle, Port Angeles and Lake Crescent Railway	
Port Townsend Railroad	PTRR	MILW	1945	1975	Chicago, Milwaukee, St. Paul and Pacific Railroad	
Port Townsend and Puget Sound Railway			1914	1929	N/A	Leased the Port Townsend Southern Railroad
Port Townsend Southern Railroad		MILW, NP	1887	1945	Port Townsend Railroad	
Portland and Puget Sound Railroad		NP	1889		Washington and Oregon Railway	
Portland and Seattle Railway		GN/ NP	1905	1908	Spokane, Portland and Seattle Railway	
Portland, Vancouver and Yakima Railway		NP	1897	1903	Washington Railway and Navigation Company	
Priest Rapids Railway		MILW	1907	1910	Chicago, Milwaukee and Puget Sound Railway	
Puget Sound and Cascade Railway			1912	1939	Mount Vernon Terminal Railway	
Puget Sound and Grays Harbor Railroad and Transportation Company		NP	1886	1896	Blakely Railroad, United Railroads of Washington	
Puget Sound Shore Railroad		NP	1882	1889	Northern Pacific and Puget Sound Shore Railroad	
Puget Sound and Willapa Harbor Railway		MILW	1913	1918	Chicago, Milwaukee and St. Paul Railway	
Republic and Kettle Valley Railway			1900	1906	Spokane and British Columbia Railway	
St. Paul, Minneapolis and Manitoba Railway		GN	1879	1907	Great Northern Railway	
Sea Lion Railroad			1997	1998	Ballard Terminal Railroad	
Seattle and International Railway		NP	1896	1901	Northern Pacific Railway	
Seattle, Lake Shore and Eastern Railway	SLS&E	NP	1885	1896	Seattle and International Railway, Spokane and Seattle Railway	
Seattle and Montana Railroad		GN	1898	1907	Great Northern Railway	
Seattle and Montana Railway		GN	1890	1898	Seattle and Montana Railroad	
Seattle and North Coast Railroad	SNCT		1979	1984	N/A	
Seattle and Northern Railway		GN	1888	1902	Seattle and Montana Railroad	
Seattle, Port Angeles and Lake Crescent Railway		MILW	1911	1915	Seattle, Port Angeles and Western Railway	
Seattle, Port Angeles and Western Railway		MILW	1915	1918	Chicago, Milwaukee and St. Paul Railway	
Seattle and San Francisco Railway and Navigation Company		NP	1899	1903	Northern Pacific Railway	
Seattle Southeastern Railway		MILW	1906	1912	Chicago, Milwaukee and Puget Sound Railway	
Seattle Terminal Railway and Elevator Company		NP	1890	1903	Northern Pacific Railway	
Seattle and Walla Walla Railroad		GN	1876	1880	Columbia and Puget Sound Railroad	
Seattle and Walla Walla Railroad and Transportation Company		GN	1873	1876	Seattle and Walla Walla Railroad	
Seattle and West Coast Railway		NP	1887	1888	Seattle, Lake Shore and Eastern Railway	
Shelton Southwestern Railroad			1891	1898	Shelton Southwestern Railway	
Shelton Southwestern Railway			1898		N/A	
Snake River Valley Railroad		UP	1898	1910	Oregon–Washington Railroad and Navigation Company	
Snohomish, Skykomish and Spokane Railway and Transportation Company		NP	1889	1892	Everett and Monte Cristo Railway	
Spokane and British Columbia Railway			1906	1919	N/A	
Spokane, Coeur d'Alene and Palouse Railway	SC&P	GN	1926	1943	Great Northern Railway	Electric until 1941
Spokane – Columbia River Railroad and Navigation Company		UP	1905	1906	North Coast Railroad	
Spokane Falls and Idaho Railroad		NP	1886	1898	Northern Pacific Railway	
Spokane Falls and Northern Railway	SF&N	GN	1888	1907	Great Northern Railway	
Spokane International Railroad	SI, SIRY	UP	1941	subsidiary in 1958, merged 1987	Union Pacific Railroad	
Spokane International Railway		UP	1905	1941	Spokane International Railroad	
Spokane and Palouse Railway		NP	1886	1898	Northern Pacific Railway	
Spokane, Portland and Seattle Railway	SP&S, SPS	GN/ NP	1908	1979	Burlington Northern Inc.	
Spokane and Seattle Railway		NP	1896	1900	Northern Pacific Railway	
Spokane Union Depot Company		UP	1900	1910	Oregon–Washington Railroad and Navigation Company	
Tacoma Eastern Railroad		MILW	1890	1918	Chicago, Milwaukee and St. Paul Railway	
Tacoma Eastern Railway	TE		1995	1998	Tacoma Rail	
Tacoma Municipal Belt Line Railway	TMBL			1998	Tacoma Rail	
Tacoma, Olympia and Chehalis Valley Railroad		NP	1889	1890	Tacoma, Olympia and Grays Harbor Railroad	
Tacoma, Olympia and Grays Harbor Railroad		NP	1890	1892	United Railroads of Washington	
Tacoma, Orting and Southeastern Railroad		NP	1888	1898	Northern Pacific Railway	
Thurston Railroad Construction Company		NP	1877	1881	Olympia and Chehalis Valley Railroad	
Toppenish, Simcoe and Western Railway		NP	1909	1912	North Yakima and Valley Railway	
Tri-City Railroad	TCRY		1999	2022	Columbia Rail	
Union Depot Company of Spokane Falls		UP	1889	1898	Spokane Union Depot Company	
United Railroads of Washington		NP	1890	1898	Northern Pacific Railway	
Vancouver, Klickitat and Yakima Railroad		NP	1887	1897	Portland, Vancouver and Yakima Railway	
Walla Walla and Columbia River Railroad		UP	1868	1910	Oregon Railroad and Navigation Company	
Walla Walla Valley Railway	WWV	NP	1910	1985	N/A	Electric until 1949
Washington Railway and Navigation Company		NP	1903	1903	Northern Pacific Railway	
Washington Central Railroad	WCRC		1986	1996	BNSF Acquisition, Inc., Columbia Basin Railroad	
Washington Central Railway		NP	1898	1914	Northern Pacific Railway	
Washington and Columbia River Railway		NP	1892	1907	Northern Pacific Railway	
Washington Electric Railway		GN/ MILW/ NP/ UP	1912	1916	Cowlitz, Chehalis and Cascade Railway	
Washington and Great Northern Railway		GN	1901	1907	Great Northern Railway	
Washington and Idaho Railroad		UP	1886	1896	Oregon Railroad and Navigation Company	
Washington and Idaho Railway	WIR	WSDOT	2006	2019	Spokane, Spangle & Palouse Railway	
Washington, Idaho and Montana Railway	WI&M	MILW	1905	1980	Burlington Northern Inc.	
Washington Northern Railway		UP	1906	1906	Oregon and Washington Railroad	
Washington and Oregon Railway		NP	1900	1903	Washington Railway and Navigation Company	
Washington Short Line Railway		NP	1888	1900	Northern Pacific Railway	
Washington Western Railway	WTW		1912	1929	N/A	
Waterville Railway			1909	1948	N/A	
Western American Company		NP	1896	1901	Northern Pacific Railway	
Yakima and Pacific Coast Railroad		NP	1890	1892	United Railroads of Washington	

Electric

- Aberdeen Electric Company
- Arlington Heights Motor Railway
- City Park Railway
- Coeur d'Alene and Spokane Railway
- Everett Railway and Electric Company
- Everett Railway, Light and Water Company
- Grays Harbor Railway and Light Company
- Grays Harbor Electric Company
- Inland Empire Railroad
- Loyal Railway
- North Shore Electric Company
- Olympia Light and Power Company
- Pacific Northwest Traction Company
- Pacific Traction Company
- Puget Sound Electric Railway
- Puget Sound International Railway and Power Company
- Puget Sound Traction, Light and Power Company
- Ross Park Street Railway
- Seattle Electric Company
- Seattle Municipal Railway
- Seattle and Rainier Beach Railway
- Seattle and Renton Railway
- Seattle, Renton and Southern Railway
- South Bend Electric Company
- Spokane Cable Railway
- Spokane, Coeur d'Alene and Palouse Railway
- Spokane and Eastern Railway and Power Company
- Spokane Electric Railway
- Spokane and Inland Railway
- Spokane and Inland Empire Railroad
- Spokane Street Railway
- Spokane Traction Company
- Tacoma Railway and Motor Company
- Tacoma Railway and Power Company
- Tacoma Railways
- Tacoma Traction Company
- Twin City Electric Company
- Twin City Light and Traction Company
- Vancouver Traction Company
- Walla Walla Valley Railway (WWV)
- Walla Walla Valley Traction Company
- Washington–Oregon Corporation
- Washington Water Power Company
- Whatcom County Railway and Light Company
- Willapa Electric Company
- Willapa Harbor Railway
- Yakima Valley Transportation Company (YVT)
