= Chelatchie Prairie Railroad =

Heritage railroad in Yacolt, Washington, US

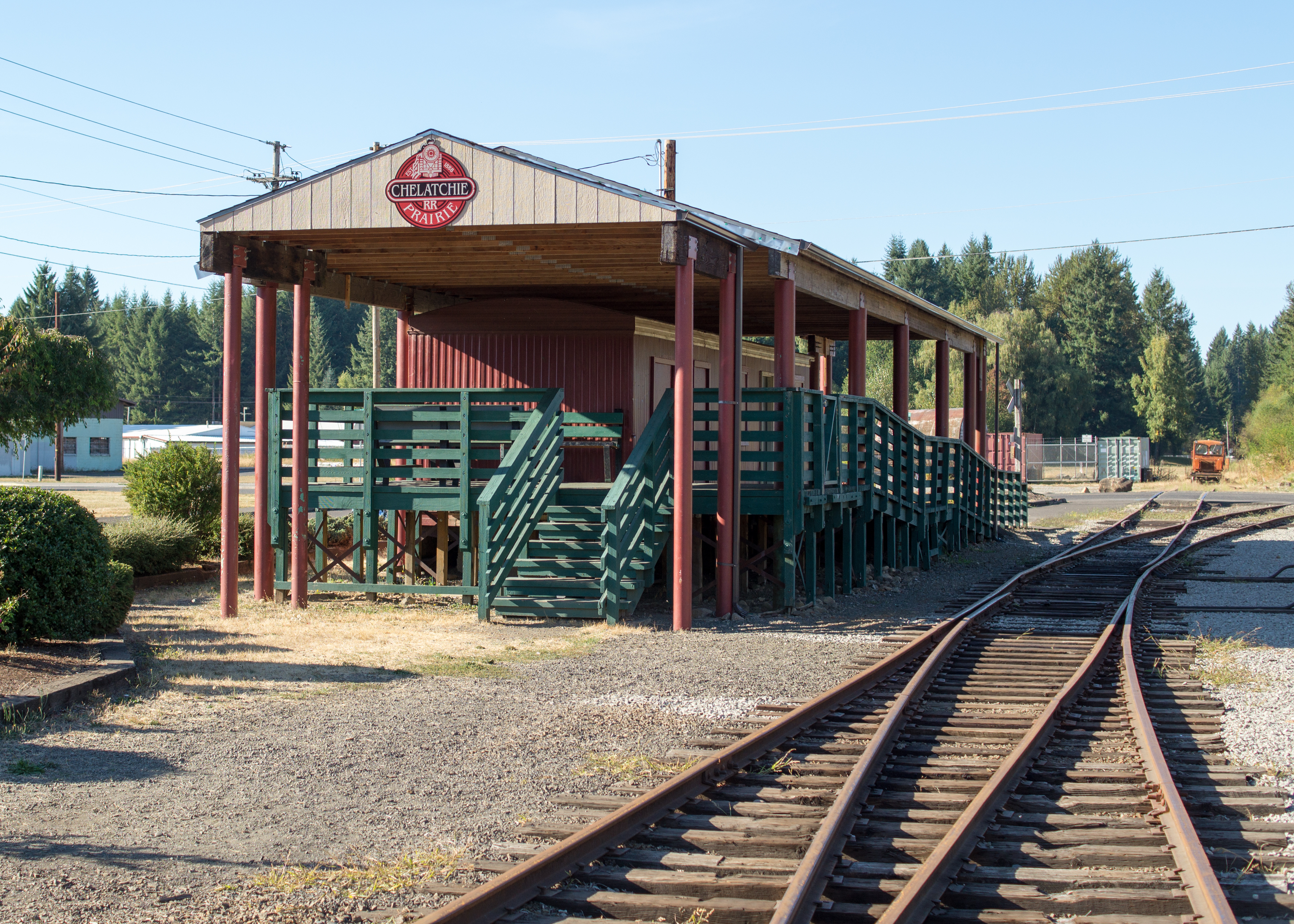
- Chelatchie Prairie Railroad Station
- Locale: Yacolt, Washington
- Coordinates: 45°51′59″N 122°24′26″W

Preserved operations
- Reporting mark: BYCX
- Length: 6 miles (9.6 km)
- Preserved gauge: 4 ft 8 1/2 in (1,435 mm)
- 2001: Excursion service began

Website
- www.chelatchieprairierr.org

The Chelatchie Prairie Railroad is a heritage railroad in Yacolt, Washington. Formerly a Northern Pacific branchline and operated by the Longview, Portland and Northern Railway for many years, in the 1980s and 1990s the line went through a number of successive operators. Today the railroad is owned by Clark County, Washington, and the trackage from Vancouver Junction to Heisson is operated by the Portland Vancouver Junction Railway for freight traffic. No freight traffic exists north of Battle Ground at this time.

The excursions travel through the historic logging country of north Clark County, Washington, from the town of Yacolt to Lucia Falls and returning, stopping for a half-hour at Moulton Falls Regional Park. A trestle crosses the East Fork Lewis River.

Excursions are typically scheduled for one or two weekends within a month, along with special excursions for the Halloween and Christmas holidays.

== Equipment ==
Currently excursions are operated using an Alco S-2 once owned by the Los Angeles Junction Railway, a former Spokane, Portland and Seattle Railway Pullman car, an open-air car, and one or two cupola cabooses of Burlington Northern heritage. Upon leaving Yacolt, the train operates in reverse to Lucia, allowing passengers in one of the two cabooses to have a forward-facing view.

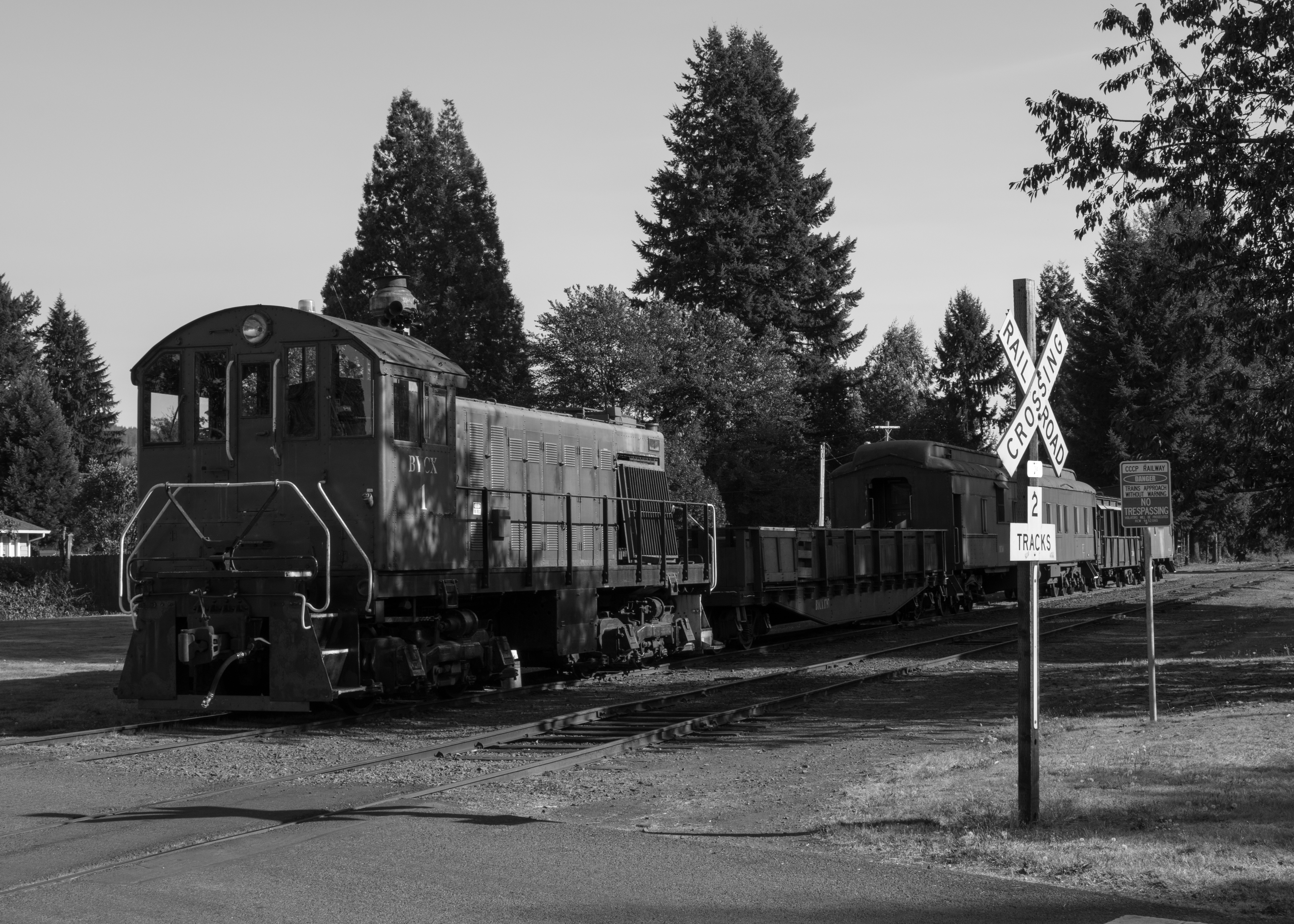
Chelatchie Prairie Railroad Passenger Train

The Chelatchie Prairie Railroad owns one steam locomotive, former Hammond Lumber Company 2-8-2T steam locomotive built by the American Locomotive Company, currently running under its original Crossett Western #10 designation. It is currently out of service awaiting fundraising for an overhaul.

In addition to the Alco 2-8-2T the Battle Ground, Yacolt and Chelatchie Prairie Railroad owns a number of diesel locomotives (notably a number of Alco S-1, S-2 or S-4 locomotives) that are in storage.

== History ==
Construction of the Chelatchie Prairie Railroad began in 1888, as the Vancouver, Klickitat, & Yakima Railroad, founded by a group of investors led by L. M. Hidden. In spite of the group's aspirations to run the line through the Cascades, the operation was bankrupt by 1897, after completing the line only as far as Brush Prairie, Washington.

The railroad was sold, and by 1903, the line had been extended to Yacolt, Washington. The line was then sold to the Northern Pacific Railway, which began daily passenger service to Yacolt. The line also served as an important freight link for the area's booming timber industry.

Harbor Plywood extended the tracks northeast to Chelatchie, Washington by 1948. The International Paper Company constructed a mill there in 1960, which was serviced by the line until its closure in 1979. The line was purchased by investors in 1981 with the intention of abandoning operations, tearing up the tracks, and selling the rails, ties, and right-of-way. However, Clark County, Washington purchased the line and leased it to the Lewis and Clark Railway before this happened.

Since 2004 Clark County has leased the line to Chelatchie Prairie Railroad to the Portland Vancouver Junction Railroad (PVJR), although the northern portion of the line's functionality has been heavily dependent on volunteer track maintenance.

== See also ==
- List of heritage railroads in the United States
- Lewis and Clark Railway
