= Central Washington Railroad =

Railroad in Washington state, US

The Central Washington Railroad (reporting mark CWA) is a common freight carrier that operates in the Yakima, Washington area. The shortline railroad operates 80 miles (130 km) on two routes in the Yakima River valley and was owned by the Temple family, which also owned the Columbia Basin Railroad. The line was acquired by Jaguar Transport Holdings in August 2025.

== Route ==
The CWA's northern route connects the communities of Fruitvale, Yakima, Union Gap and Moxee City.

The CWA's southern route connects the communities of Granger, Sunnyside, Grandview and Prosser.

== See also ==
- List of Washington (state) railroads
