= Lewis and Clark Railway =

Railroad in Washington State, US

Overview
- Reporting mark: LINC
- Locale: Clark County, Washington

Technical
- Track gauge: 4 ft 8 1/2 in (1,435 mm)
- Length: 33 mi (53 km)

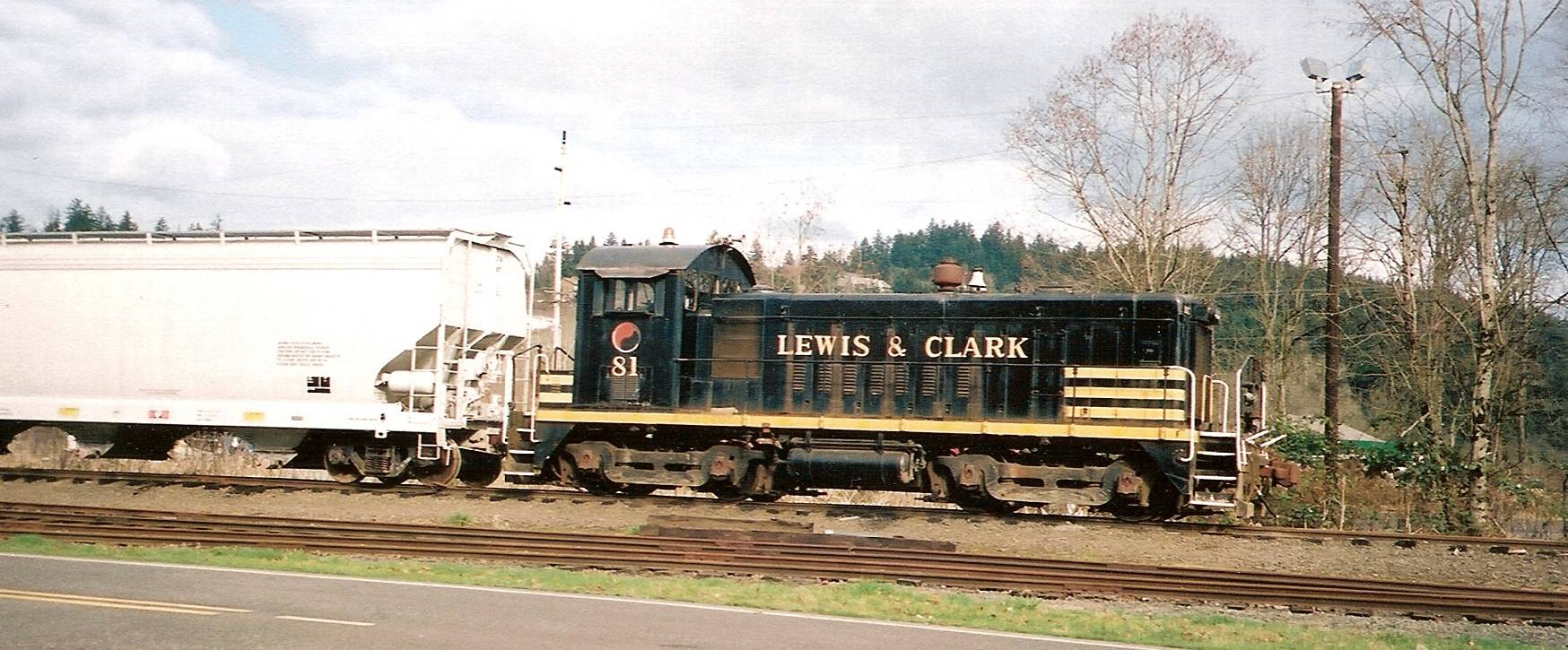
Lewis and Clark Railway train, February 2002.

The Lewis and Clark Railway (reporting mark LINC) was a county-owned Class III shortline railroad located in Clark County, Washington. The line was 33 miles (53 km) long, beginning at the BNSF interchange at Rye Junction in Vancouver, Washington and stretching northeast, passing through Brush Prairie and Battle Ground to the line's northern end past Yacolt.

== History ==
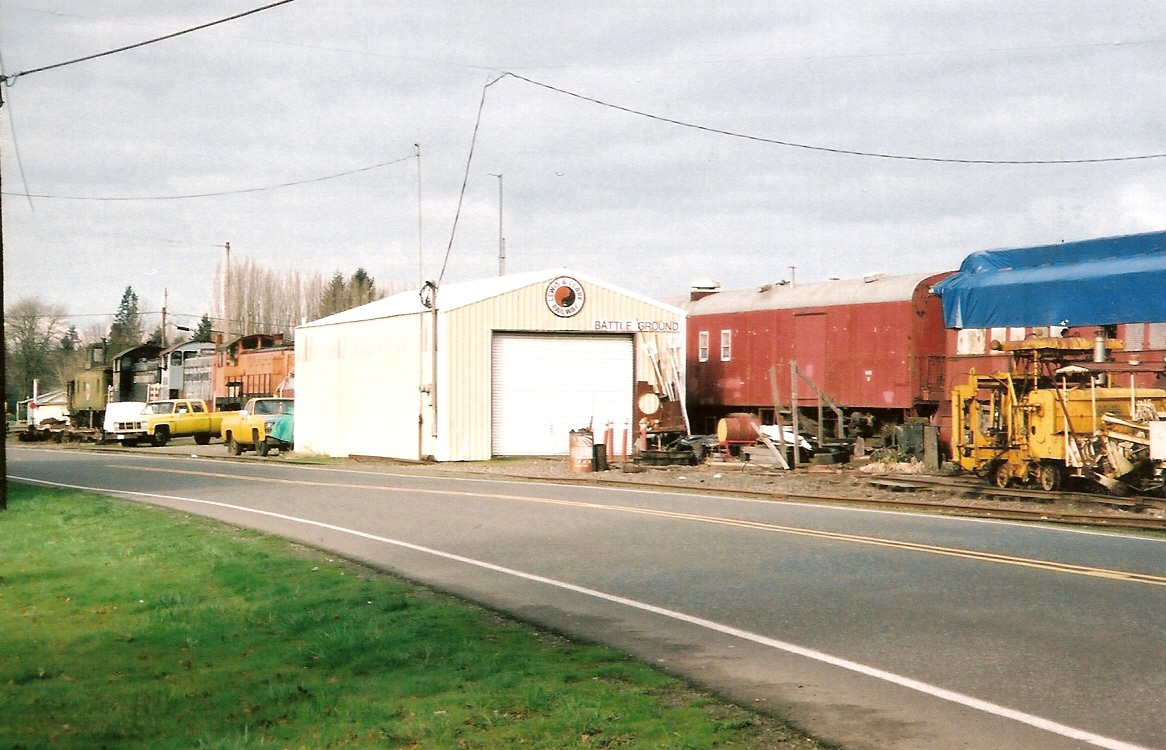
Lewis and Clark Railway Shops, Battle Ground, February 2002.

- 1888: Built to Brush Prairie as the Vancouver, Klickitat & Yakima. Original line extended from a ferry dock near the current Vancouver depot up Lincoln Street.
- 1898: Reorganized by new owners as the Portland, Vancouver and Yakima Railroad.
- 1902: Line extended to Yacolt.
- 1903: Northern Pacific Railway acquires the line.
- 1948: Harbor Plywood Company builds an independent line from Yacolt to Chelatchie Prairie.
- 1950: Longview, Portland and Northern Railway acquires the Harbor Plywood line.
- 1960: Longview, Portland and Northern Railway acquires the NP line from Rye to Yacolt. NP continues to service branch to Rye.
- 1979: International Paper in Chelatchie Prairie closes. Traffic drops precipitously.
- 1981: Chelatchie Prairie Railroad acquires the line.
- 1984: Service discontinued.
- 1985: Abandonment authorized on August 29.
- 1987: Line purchased by Clark County and begins operation as LINC.
- 2001: Chelatchie Prairie Railroad (BYCX) leases the portion of the line from Battle Ground to Chelatchie and begins excursions.
- 2004: The line is leased to the Columbia Basin Railroad to take over operations.
- 2012: The lease agreement is sold to Portland Vancouver Junction Railroad, which is wholly owned by Eric Temple.

== See also ==
- List of Washington (state) railroads
