= Lake Creek and Coeur d'Alene Railroad =

The Lake Creek and Coeur d'Alene Railroad built a 14.18-mile (22.82 km) rail line between Manito, Washington and Amwaco, Idaho. It was incorporated on July 26, 1906, in Oregon, and completed the line on June 12, 1910. From opening, the company's line, and a steamboat it had acquired, were leased to the Oregon Railroad and Navigation Company (OR&N). The OR&N was already operating a line through Manito to Spokane (built by the Washington and Idaho Railroad), and at Amwaco it used the steamboat to cross Lake Coeur d'Alene to Harrison, which was located on another ex-Washington and Idaho Railroad line to Wallace. The combined railroad and steamboat line thus formed a shorter route between Spokane and Wallace than the all-rail route via Tekoa, and helped the OR&N successfully compete with the electric interurban Coeur d'Alene and Spokane Railway and its steamboat connection.

The properties of the OR&N and Lake Creek and Coeur d'Alene Railroad were conveyed to new Union Pacific Railroad (UP) subsidiary Oregon–Washington Railroad and Navigation Company on December 23, 1910. The Interstate Commerce Commission authorized abandonment of the entire line in 1932. Later, in 1955, the UP would acquire trackage rights over the Chicago, Milwaukee, St. Paul and Pacific Railroad's line between Manito and Plummer, again creating a shortcut between Spokane and Wallace, and abandon its ex-Washington and Idaho Railroad line between Tekoa and Plummer.

== See also ==
- List of defunct Idaho railroads
- List of defunct Washington railroads
