= Willapa =

Willapa may refer to:

- Willapa people, an Athapaskan-speaking people in Washington, United States
- Willapa River, river on the Pacific coast of southwestern Washington, United States
- General Miles, a ship
- Willapa Electric Company, an electric railway and electric utility company incorporated on August 2, 1913
- Willapa Bay, a bay located on the southwest Pacific coast of Washington state in the United States
- Willapa Hills, a geologic, physiographic, and geographic region in southwest Washington
