= Oregon, Washington and Idaho Railroad =

The Oregon, Washington and Idaho Railroad built a 72.03-mile (115.92 km) rail line along the right (north) bank of the Snake River between Riparia, Washington and Lewiston, Idaho. The company was incorporated in Oregon on August 8, 1903, and began operating its completed line on July 7, 1908, as an operating subsidiary of the Union Pacific Railroad, which also controlled the Oregon Railroad and Navigation Company (OR&N) through Riparia. A portion of the preliminary work had been done by the Snake River Valley Railroad, which built a completed line along the Snake River below Riparia. Beginning on December 3, 1909, the Camas Prairie Railroad, a joint subsidiary of the OR&N and Northern Pacific Railway (NP), began operating the Oregon, Washington and Idaho Railroad as part of a line between Riparia and Grangeville, Idaho, including segments owned by the NP and subsidiary Clearwater Short Line Railway. On December 23, 1910, the property of the Oregon, Washington and Idaho was conveyed to new Union Pacific subsidiary Oregon–Washington Railroad and Navigation Company, successor to the OR&N, but the Camas Prairie Railroad continued to operate it as agent.

In 1998, the Camas Prairie Railroad was spun off to new shortline Camas Prairie RailNet, which bought the Riparia–Lewiston line from the Union Pacific Railroad. In 2004 the Great Northwest Railroad replaced Camas Prairie RailNet as owner and operator of the line.

== See also ==
- List of defunct Idaho railroads
- List of defunct Washington railroads
