= Chelatchie, Washington =

Unincorporated community in Clark County, Washington

Chelatchie
- Unincorporated community
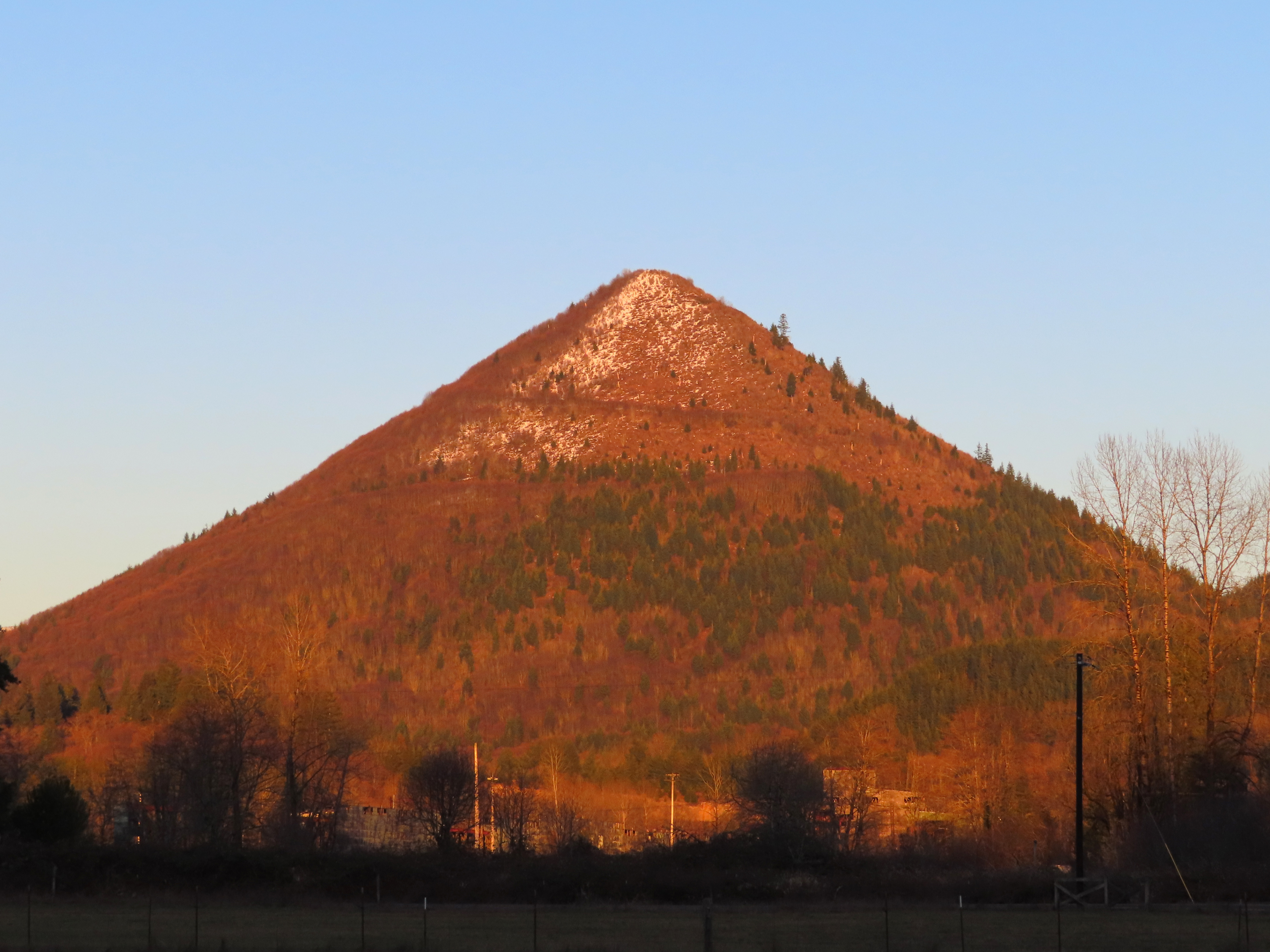
- Tumtum Mountain, visible from Chelatchie

- Location within the state of Washington Chelatchie (the United States)
- Coordinates: 45°55′40″N 122°22′46″W
- Country: United States
- State: Washington
- County: Clark
- Elevation: 509 ft (155 m)
- Time zone: UTC-8 (Pacific (PST))
  - Summer (DST): UTC-7 (PDT)
- Area code: 360
- GNIS feature ID: 1517652

Chelatchie is an unincorporated community in Clark County, Washington.

Chelatchie is located about 30 miles (48 km) northeast of Vancouver, Washington in the Chelatchie Prairie (or Chelatchie Valley) area, and consists of several homes, a general store, and a United States Forest Service visitor center for the Mount St. Helens Volcanic National Monument. It is one of the more remote communities on Washington State Route 503, and serves as a gateway into the Siouxon Creek area of the Gifford Pinchot National Forest.

== History ==
The area was first settled around 1860, and was among the first settlements in the area. The name was derived from "ch'álacha," a Klickitat word describing a valley with tall ferns.

The Chelatchie Prairie Railroad was extended to the area in 1948, with the International Paper Company opening a plywood mill at the end of the line in 1960, which operated until 1979.
