= Aquatrain =

Rail barge formerly operated by the Canadian National Railway

History
- Name: Aquatrain
- Operator: Canadian National Railway
- Route: Prince Rupert, British Columbia, Canada to Whittier, Alaska, United States
- Builder: Shin-A shipbuilding
- Completed: 1982
- Out of service: April 2021

General characteristics
- Type: Sea-going rail barge
- Installed power: None
- Crew: None

The Aquatrain (or AquaTrain) was an unpowered unmanned sea-going rail barge operated by Canadian National Railway (CN) between Prince Rupert, British Columbia, Canada, and the Alaska Railroad in Whittier, Alaska, United States. It was the largest such barge in the world, containing 8 sidings and using a tug for power and control. The length of loadable train, some 50 cars, would, if the cars were placed end to end, rise up twice as tall as the Chicago Willis Tower. The ferry service started operations in 1962, and had a 3-day voyage between Whittier and Prince Rupert, usually operating once a week, year-round. The Aquatrain barge was built in 1982 by South Korea's Shin-A shipbuilding, and is 400 ft × 100 ft (122 m × 30 m). Since 1993, the Aquatrain's maritime tugboats and tug crews were provided by Foss Maritime. Foss utilized two 116 ft (35 m) tugboats Justine Foss and Barbara Foss.

Service ended in April 2021.
