= Olympic Discovery Trail =

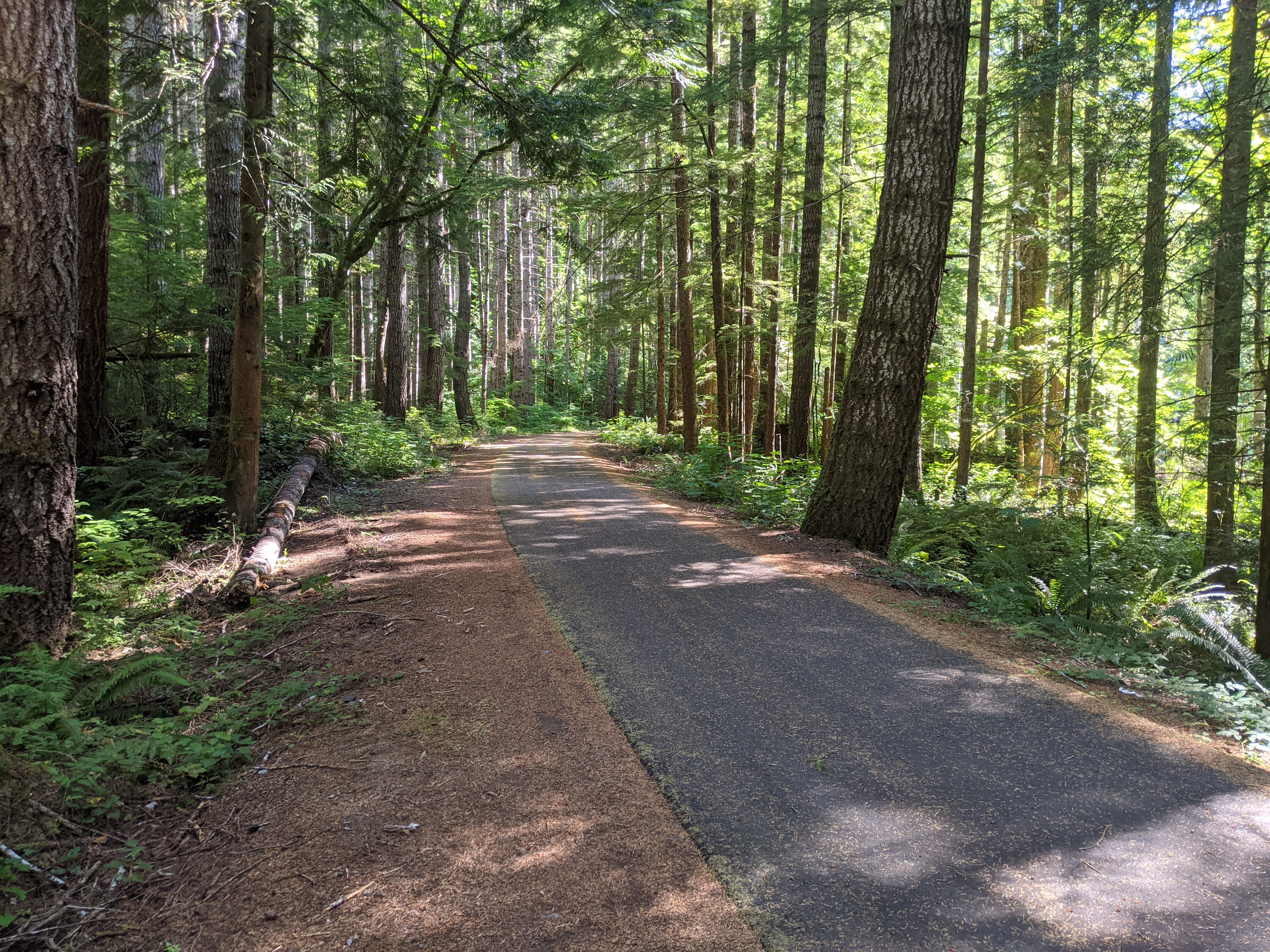
- Olympic Discovery Trail in Clallam County
- Length: 135 miles (217 km)
- Location: Washington (state)
- Use: Multi-use
- Hazards: Trail has undeveloped portions; trail overlays on public roads
- Website: Olympic Discovery Trail

The Olympic Discovery Trail is a rail trail spanning the north end of the Olympic Peninsula in Washington. The route is designated as a multi-use trail and spans 135 miles (217 km) between Port Townsend and La Push on the Pacific Coast. As of 2021, 90 miles (140 km) of the trail have been developed into a complete path. The remainder of the route can be ridden using a combination of public roads.

== History ==
The trail was the brainchild of three area cyclists who formed the Peninsula Trails Coalition (PTC) for the purpose of developing the trail across a derelict railroad grade of the Seattle and North Coast Railroad. The railroad was sold fairly quickly after the formal abandonment. The coalition has been working with a number of agencies to build a contiguous trail system on or along the original rail route.

The Peninsula Trails Coalition continue to bring together many jurisdictions and volunteers who maintain the trail as well as advocate for its development. The 2016 effort to reconstruct the Dungeness River Bridge after the wood trestle was destroyed in the spring of 2015, brought together over 1,400 volunteer hours, a large donation from First Federal Community Foundation to the Jamestown S'Klallam Tribe, which owns and operates the bridge and adjacent Railroad Bridge Park to replace the aging wood deck and other improvement tasks. Public funding to replace the washed-out trestle with a 750' steel span, improved the quality of the river as part of larger salmon recovery project in the area.

== Route ==
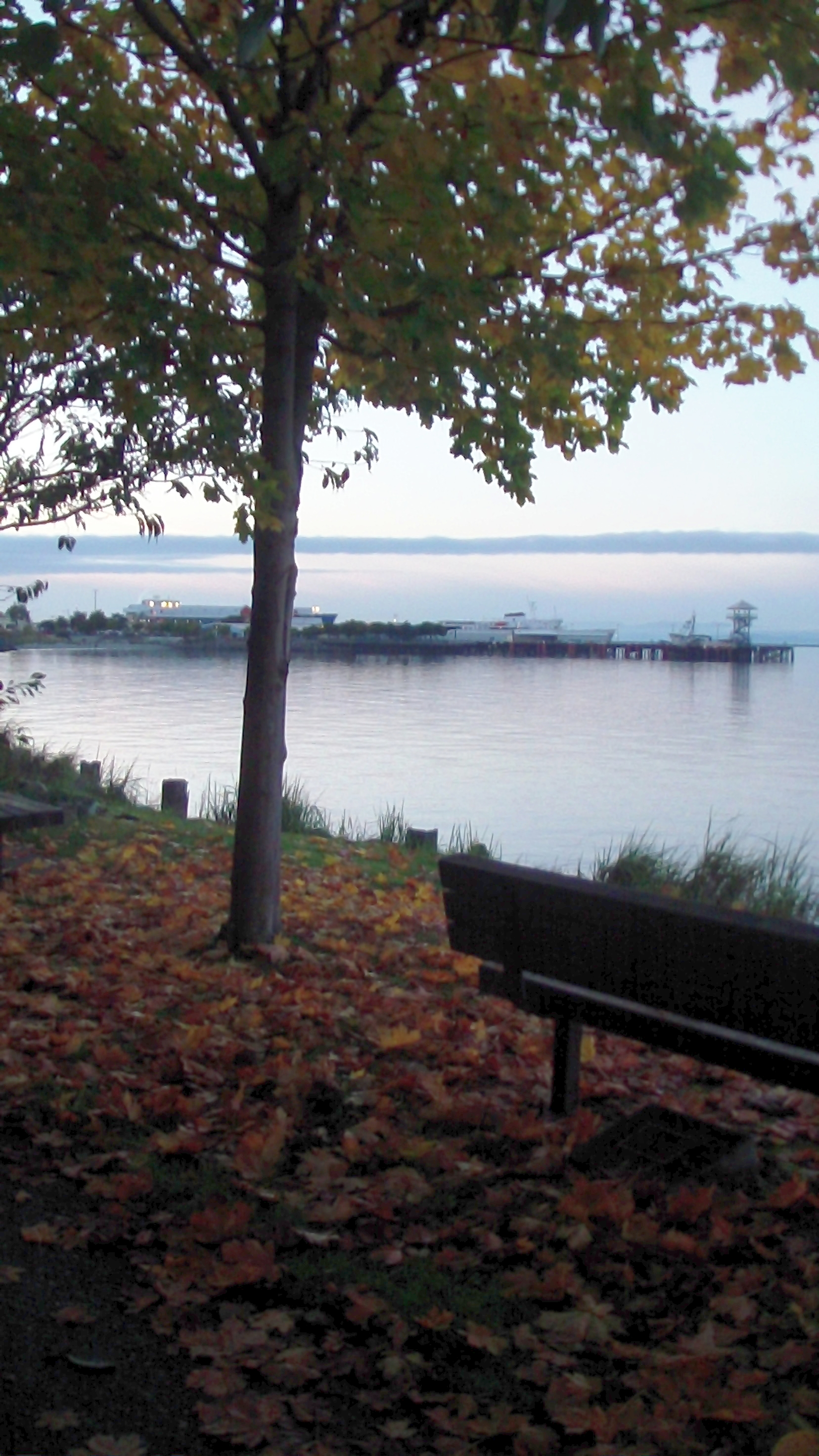
The Strait of Juan de Fuca from the Olympic Discovery Trail

Using public roads and off-street non-motorized trails, the trail is a contiguous 135 miles (217 km) in length. There is an optional Adventure Trail route that can be substituted for the west central section of the trail from Elwha River to Lake Crescent.

=== Trail status ===
As of September 2019

| Section | Off-Street Trail | Light-Road Temporary | Busy-Road Temporary | Total |
|---|---|---|---|---|
| East | 10.5 mi | 7.4 mi | 8.5 mi | 26.4 mi |
| East Central | 24.1 mi | 2.0 mi | 0.0 mi | 26.1 mi |
| West Central | 16.4 mi | 7.6 mi | 9.1 mi | 33.1 mi |
| West | 8.3 mi | 23.6 mi | 10.4 mi | 42.3 mi |
| TOTAL | 59.3 mi | 40.6 mi | 28.0 mi | 127.9 mi |

=== Adventure Trail ===
The Olympic Adventure Trail (OAT) has been built by Clallam County volunteers as an adjunct to the Olympic Discovery Trail. It is built for mountain bikers, hikers, and equestrians. It has 25 miles of mostly single-track riding over scenic, hilly, forested terrain. One-third of this section is forest roads.

== See also ==
- Bicycle touring
- Rail trail
