= Puget Sound Shore Railroad =

Railroad in Washington (state), USA

The Puget Sound Shore Railroad (properly The Puget Sound Shore Railroad Company) and successor Northern Pacific and Puget Sound Shore Railroad (properly Northern Pacific & Puget Sound Shore Railroad Company) built a branch line of the Northern Pacific Railroad between Puyallup and Seattle, Washington, U.S., and partially constructed a line around the east side of Lake Washington to Woodinville.

== History ==
After Congress chartered the Northern Pacific Railroad (NP) in 1864, the communities along Puget Sound competed to be its Pacific terminus. Tacoma, about 40 miles (64 km) south of Seattle, became the winner in July 1873, when the NP, then building north from Portland, selected it. Seattle businessmen immediately incorporated the Seattle and Walla Walla Railroad and Transportation Company to build their own line east, but were only able to build 20 miles (32 km) of narrow gauge line to a coal mine at Newcastle. Although it proved successful in carrying coal to the salt water at Seattle, it did not give Seattle its eastward connection.

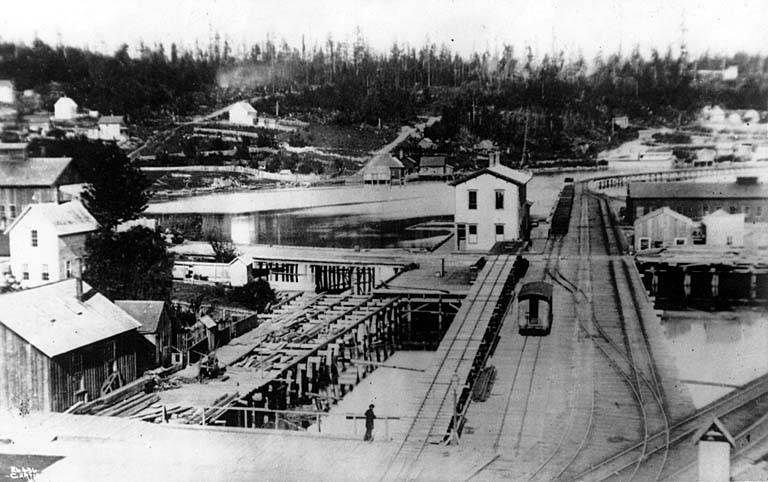
Columbia and Puget Sound Railway station and docks in Seattle

Henry Villard, owner of the Oregon Railway and Navigation Company, bought the Seattle and Walla Walla in November 1880 and reorganized it as the Columbia and Puget Sound Railroad (C&PS), intending to connect the two in eastern Washington. Villard gained control of the NP in June 1881, and created the Oregon and Transcontinental Company (O&T) as a holding company for the NP and other companies that would build branch lines prohibited by the NP's charter. In contrast to the NP's earlier spurning of Seattle, Villard promised that the main line would not end at Tacoma, which it had reached in 1874, but would continue to Seattle.

That city granted the O&T right of way along Elliott Bay between King and Cedar Streets in March 1882, and on August 19 the Puget Sound Shore Railroad was incorporated to build the branch. From a junction with the 1877 Tacoma–Wilkeson branch at Meeker (east of Puyallup) north to Stuck Junction (south of Auburn), the NP itself constructed the line; the remainder to Seattle was built by the new company. North of Black River Junction, the Puget Sound Shore Railroad built its standard gauge line on the grade of the narrow gauge C&PS at the base of Beacon Hill, by laying two new standard gauge rails and replacing one of the C&PS's rails between them in a dual gauge setup. At a junction point near Addition Street (just north of Atlantic Street), the new line left the C&PS's curving alignment and headed directly northwest on a trestle, crossing King Street at First Avenue and then following the waterfront.

The last spike of the NP's transcontinental line was driven on September 8, 1883, but Villard's financial empire collapsed later that year, with the branch to Seattle not yet completed. New NP president Charles B. Wright announced that Tacoma would be the railroad's terminus, with Seattle simply the end of a local branch line. O&T subsidiary Oregon Improvement Company completed the construction, and Seattle's first standard gauge train entered the city on June 17, 1884. Regular service between Seattle and Tacoma did not begin until July 6, 1884, but in late August it suddenly ended when the NP and Oregon Improvement Company could not agree on the operation of what had become known as the "Orphan Road".

The NP incorporated a new lessor subsidiary, the Northern Pacific and Puget Sound Shore Railroad, on August 23, 1884, to acquire the entire line between Meeker and Seattle. Talks dragged on, and finally, in early October 1885, the NP began repairing the damage from a year of neglect, reopening it permanently on October 26. On October 31, 1889, the property of the Puget Sound Shore Railroad was sold to the new NP subsidiary, and on April 21, 1898, the line was sold to the reorganized Northern Pacific Railway. In addition, the company in 1890 and 1891 had partially constructed a branch from Black River Junction around the east side of Lake Washington to Woodinville, which the NP completed in 1903 and 1904. (The NP's line over Stampede Pass would open in 1887, connecting near Wilkeson with the old branch and shortening the distance east from Seattle and Tacoma.)

The C&PS standard-gauged its line in 1897, and in 1901 the C&PS and NP came to an agreement to split the shared right-of-way, the NP taking the west half and the C&PS the east half. The NP also built a new line between Argo and Seattle, mostly along Colorado Avenue, and in 1903 the two companies swapped lines north of Argo. The C&PS now crossed the NP at Argo to reach the Colorado Avenue trackage, and the NP became sole owner of the grade at the base of Beacon Hill north of Argo. This grade soon became a minor branch when a straighter line on Second Avenue opened, connecting at the new King Street Station with the Great Northern Railway's new tunnel under downtown.

The main line between Meeker and Seattle has remained as a major part of today's BNSF Railway, now forming the north end of the Seattle–Vancouver Seattle Subdivision, and carries Amtrak's Coast Starlight and Cascades. On the other hand, the Woodinville Subdivision around the east side of Lake Washington has been mostly abandoned.

== See also ==
- List of defunct Washington railroads
