= List of reporting marks: E =

Note: Marks ending in U are for container owners; marks ending in X are not common carriers; marks ending in Z are for trailers without flanged wheels. All other marks are of common-carrier railroads.

== E ==
- EACH - East Camden and Highland Railroad
- EACU - East Asiatic Company
- EAGX - Eaglebrook, Inc.
- EAMX - Everest Railcar Services, Inc.
- EARY - Eastern Alabama Railway
- EASO - EASX Corporation
- EASU - Waterfront Container Leasing Company
- EASZ - Waterfront Container Leasing Company
- EBAX - Ethyl Corporation
- EBBX - Ed Burrier and Associates
- EBGR - Eastern Berks Gateway Railroad
- EBPX - Empire Builder Private Cars
- ECBR - East Cooper and Berkeley Railroad
- ECCX - Ethyl Canada, Inc.
- ECDU - ECDC Environmental, LC
- ECDX - Edwin Cooper, Inc.
- ECGX - Alabama Power Company
- ECIX - Erman Corporation
- ECLX - ELM-Central Rail Leasing, LP
- ECNX - ECN Rail Finance, LLC
- ECO - Ecorail, Inc.
- ECOX - Eco East
- ECOZ - Ecorail, Inc.
- ECPX - ECC America, Inc.
- ECQX - Engineered Carbons
- ECRX - Econo-Rail Corporation
- ECRZ - Norfolk Southern
- ECTB - East Chattanooga Belt Railway
- ECUX - Exxon Chemical Americas; Exxon-Mobil Corporation
- ECXX - ECDC Environmental, LC
- EDCX - EDC, Inc.
- EDEX - Empire District Electric Company
- EDGX - Alliant Energy
- EDIU - EDI, Inc.
- EDIZ - EDI, Inc.
- EDSX - Exxon Company, USA
- EDW - El Dorado and Western Railway
- EDZX - Envases de Zacatecas, SA de CV
- EE - Ellis and Eastern Company
- EEC - East Erie Commercial Railroad
- EEIX - Electric Energy, Inc.
- EELX - Evans Railcar Leasing Company
- EENX - Equipment Enterprise, Inc.
- EFRR - Effingham Railroad
- EGSX - Entergy Gulf States, Inc.
- EHDX - Luria Steel and Trading Corporation (Erman-Howell Division)
- EHSX - Essex Hybrid Seed Company, Inc.
- EICX - Edlow International Company
- EIDU - Ethyl, SA
- EIRC - Eastern Illinois Railroad
- EIRR - Eastern Idaho Railroad
- EISU - Evergreen International
- EJE - Elgin, Joliet and Eastern Railway
- EJR - East Jersey Railroad and Terminal Company
- EK - Eastern Kentucky Railway; Eastern Kentucky Southern Railway
- EKBU - Keiserling, Ltd.
- EKLU - K Line
- EL - Erie Lackawanna Railway; Norfolk Southern
- ELCX - Eli Lilly and Company
- ELFX - Electric Fuels Corporation
- ELKR - Elk River Railroad
- ELKX - ELkem Metals Company
- ELS - Escanaba and Lake Superior Railroad
- ELSX - Kentucky May Coal Company
- ELTX - Soltex Polymers, Inc.
- EM - Edgemoor and Manetta Railway
- EMAX - EMAS
- EMCU - Evergreen Marine Corporation
- EMCZ - Evergreen International
- EMDX - Electro-Motive Division Leasing
- EMEU - East Med Tanks, Ltd.
- EMHR - East Mahanoy and Hazelton Railroad
- EMHU - EMP
- EMIX - Environmental Management, Inc.
- EMLX - Electro-Motive Division Leasing
- EMMU - Eastern Mediterranean Container Company, Ltd.
- EMPU - REZ-1
- EMPX - Empiregas Equipment Corporation
- EMRY - Eastern Maine Railway
- EMTU - East-Med Tanks International
- EMUU - REZ-1
- EN - E and N Railway (RailAmerica); Canadian Pacific Railway
- E&N - E and N Railway (RailAmerica; Canadian Pacific Railway
- ENCX - EN ERCO International, Inc.
- ENDX - GATX de Mexico, SA de CV
- ENEX - Lake Shore Railway Historical Society
- ENGX - Englehard Corporation
- ENPX - Enterprise Products Company
- ENR - E and N Railway (RailAmerica); Canadian Pacific Railway
- ENRX - United States Enrichment Corporation
- ENSZ - Norfolk Southern
- EOGX - Union Carbide Ethylene Oxide/Glycol Company
- EPAX - Exxon-Mobil Corporation
- EPCX - Enterprise Products Company
- EPIX - EPIC (a division of Synagro)
- EPRY - East Penn Railway
- EPTC - Oregon Pacific Railroad
- EQUX - Equistar Chemicals
- ERBU - Containers for Bulk Haul Kieserling
- ERCU - Erco Industries, Ltd.
- ERCX - Excel Railcar Corporation
- ERDX - Merchants Despatch Transportation Corporation
- ERFU - Ermefer, SA
- ERIE - Erie Railroad; Erie Lackawanna Railway; Norfolk Southern
- ERIX - Eric Dewayne Hopp; ERIX Railcar
- ERLX - Evans Railcar Leasing Company; GE Railcar Services Corporation
- ERSX - Excel Railcar Services, Inc.
- ESCX - First Security Bank National Association
- ESHR - Eastern Shore Railroad
- ESLJ - East St. Louis Junction Railroad
- ESLZ - East St. Louis Junction Railroad
- ESMX - Essem Corporation
- ESRX - Empire State Railcar, Inc.
- ESSU - K Line
- ESSX - Colonial Chemical Company
- ETC - East Texas Central Railroad
- ETCX - Tennessee Eastman Company; Eastman Chemical Company
- ETL - Essex Terminal Railway
- ETMX - Etarco Rail Services Corporation
- ETR - Essex Terminal
- ETRX - Entergy
- ETRY - East Tennessee Railway
- ETSX - Emery Tree Service, Inc.
- ETX - Essex Terminal Railway
- ETTX - East Texas Transportation Company; TTX Corporation
- EUGX - Far-Mar-Co, Inc.; Farmland Industries, Inc.
- EURX - EuroCan Pulp and Paper Company, Ltd.
- EUSX - Exxon-Mobil Corporation
- EV - Everett Railroad
- EVAU - Eisenbahn-Vverkehrsmittel, AG
- EVEX - American Colloid Company
- EVRC - Fremont and Elkhorn Valley Railroad
- EVT - Evansville Terminal Company, Inc.
- EVWR - Evansville Western Railway
- EWG - Eastern Washington Gateway Railroad
- EWR - Elkhart and Western Railroad
- EWSX - Indianapolis Power & Light
- EXEX - Commonwealth Edison Company
- EXFU - Exsif
- EXMX - Express Marco Transportation
- EXO - Réseau de transport métropolitain (exo)
