= Washington Eastern Railroad =

Railroad in Eastern Washington, US

Overview
- Headquarters: Medical Lake, Washington
- Reporting mark: WER
- Locale: Eastern Washington
- Dates of operation: 2018–
- Predecessor: Eastern Washington Gateway Railroad

Technical
- Track gauge: 4 ft 8 1/2 in (1,435 mm)
- Length: 114.8 miles (184.8 km)

Other
- Website: washingtoneasternrr.com

The Washington Eastern Railroad is a shortline railroad located in Eastern Washington in the United States. It runs on the CW Branch built by the Northern Pacific Railway from 1889–1890 and was previously used by the Eastern Washington Gateway Railroad until 2018. The WER was owned by The Western Group; on November 1, 2020, it was acquired by Jaguar Transport Holdings of Joplin, Missouri.

== History ==
The Eastern Washington Gateway Railroad was established on June 1, 2007, after the purchase of the CW branch of the Palouse River and Coulee City Railroad (PCC) by the Washington State Department of Transportation (WSDOT). The branch, which saw low traffic and high deferred maintenance costs, was slated to be abandoned by the railroad. The state purchased the line in February 2007 for $5.6 million, after lobbying from grain growers in the region.

The Inland Northwest Rail Museum was constructed in 2016 in Reardan, Washington, adjacent to trackage owned by EWG. The museum is home to several pieces of historic railroad equipment from Eastern Washington.

EWG went out of business on November 4, 2018, with operations assumed by Washington Eastern Railroad, a new entity operated by the Western Group. The last EWG train ran on November 3, 2018.

The Western Group won the bid from WSDOT to operate the CW Branch on September 4, 2018. In late 2018, WER began building an extension on the Geiger Spur to serve Spokane International Airport and surrounding industrial facilities.

Jaguar Transport Holding acquired the line on November 1, 2020.

== Route ==
The WER operates on the state-owned CW Branch. The route runs starts in Cheney in a junction with the BNSF Railway line. The route then proceeds along SR 904 to Four Lakes. At Four Lakes, the tracks cross under I-90 and meet the grain elevator operated by HighLine Grain Growers. From here, the tracks continue north where they connect with the 6 mile long Geiger Spur, owned by the Spokane County government, that connects with Airway Heights. The tracks follow SR 902 to Medical Lake, then turn north again to US 2. The tracks follow US 2 for the remainder of the route to where it terminates in Coulee City.

== Operations ==
The WER currently hauls scoot trains one to four times a week depending on the time of year. It goes out to Coulee City dropping off empty cars at various communities and comes back one to two days later picking up those loaded cars and taking them to the grain storage operated by HighLine Grain Growers in Four Lakes. After the grain is unloaded, WER heads back out and repeats the process. The company also runs a more infrequent train up the Geiger Spur that mainly transports steel. When the HighLine grain storage is full, WER contacts BNSF, who will send a train via the WER trackage from Cheney and take it elsewhere.

== See also ==
- List of Washington (state) railroads
- List of reporting marks: E
