= Snake River Valley Railroad =

Defunct railroad

The Snake River Valley Railroad built a rail line on the left (southeast) bank of the Snake River between Wallula and Grange City, Washington, United States, a distance of 65.85 miles (105.98 km). The company was incorporated in Oregon on March 3, 1898, and opened its line, operated by the Oregon Railroad and Navigation Company (OR&N), on December 1, 1899. It connected to the OR&N at both ends, providing a better route to Spokane than the existing line via Walla Walla. The properties of both companies were conveyed to new Union Pacific Railroad (UP) subsidiary Oregon–Washington Railroad and Navigation Company on December 23, 1910.

The Snake River Valley Railroad also did some work on the right bank above Riparia for a continuation to Lewiston, Idaho, which was instead completed by the Oregon, Washington and Idaho Railroad. (Between Grange City and Riparia, the OR&N already owned a line, including a bridge at Riparia.)

The line between Wallula and Grange City is still operated by the UP as a main line, mostly as part of the Hinkle, Oregon – Spokane, Washington Ayer Subdivision. At Ayer Junction, this line turns north across the Snake River, and the remaining distance to Grange City is part of the Riparia Subdivision.

== See also ==
- List of defunct Washington railroads
