= Meeker Southern Railroad =

Railroad in Washington state, US

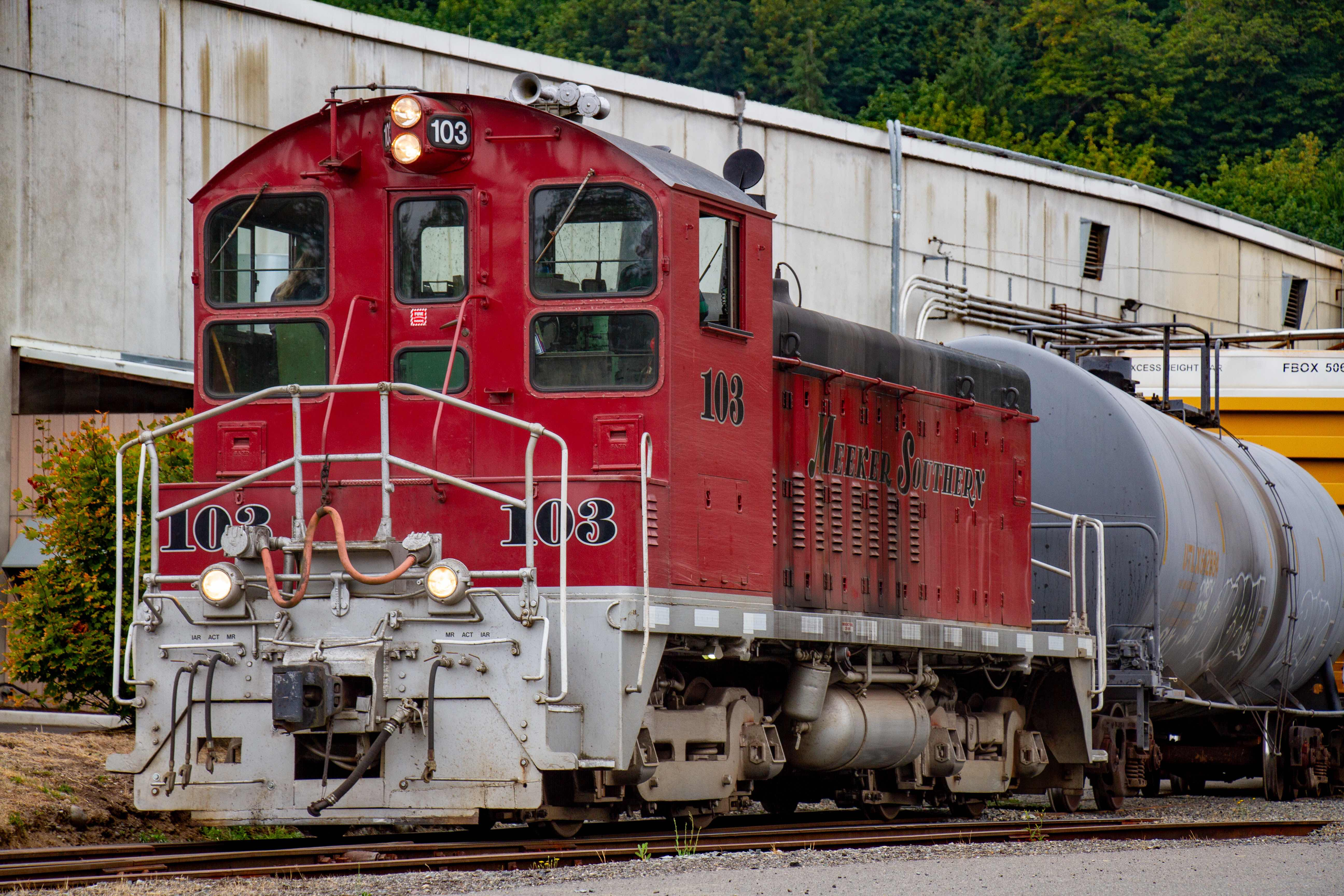
- The Meeker Southern Railroad's train at the McMillin Park of Industry

Overview
- Termini: BNSF Railway Interchange, Meeker, Washington; McMillin, Washington
- Connecting lines: BNSF Seattle Subdivision

Service
- Operator(s): Ballard Terminal Railroad
- Depot(s): Meeker Southern East Puyallup Facility

Technical
- Line length: 5 mi (8.0 km)
- Operating speed: 5 mph (8.0 km/h)

The Meeker Southern Railroad (reporting mark MSN) is a Class III shortline railroad owned by Ballard Terminal Railroad Company LLC that travels approximately 5 miles (8.0 km) between East Puyallup ("Meeker") and McMillin in Washington, United States.

The Meeker Southern runs on former BNSF Railway tracks originally laid by the Northern Pacific Railway.

== History ==
The Meeker Southern's tracks were originally constructed by the Northern Pacific Railway as their main line into the railway's original terminus in Tacoma. The completed rail line formerly connected Puyallup to Palmer Junction via Buckley. From Palmer Junction, the rail line joined the Main Line (currently the BNSF Stampede Subdivision) to continue east over Stampede Pass.

After the opening of the main line extension to Auburn (or the "Palmer Cutoff" through Kanaskat) which branches off from Palmer Junction, the former trackage was transitioned to a branch line, named by the Northern Pacific as the "Buckley Line". In 1984, the former Northern Pacific Main Line over Stampede Pass (the Stampede Subdivision) as well as the Buckley Line were mothballed as redundant by the railroad's successor company, the Burlington Northern. While the Stampede Subdivision would be reopened again some 15 years later, the Buckley Line fell into disuse. Currently, the Buckley Line is truncated with 5 miles of track branching out from Meeker operating as the Meeker Southern, and 5 miles of track branching out from Palmer Junction owned by the BNSF Railway as a storage track in Veazie. A roughly 30 mile gap without rails exists between these two sections; built-over in several communities.

The Meeker Southern was established as a subsidiary of the Ballard Terminal Railroad to operate on the former Buckley Line. Currently the Meeker Southern serves customers in both East Puyallup and McMillin.

== Locomotives ==
The Meeker Southern owns two locomotives. Primary power is provided by number 103, an EMD SW9. In 2020, after the shutdown of the Eastside Freight Railroad (another subsidiary of the Ballard Terminal Railroad), the Meeker Southern acquired their locomotive, an EMD SW1200 numbered 109. 109 currently serves the role of backup power on the Meeker Southern.
