= Ballard Terminal Railroad =

Short line terminal railroads in Washington, US

Coordinates: 47.663294°N 122.379668°W

Ballard Terminal Railroad Company LLC
Overview
- Headquarters: Seattle, Washington
- Reporting mark: BDTL, MSN, EFRX
- Locale: Seattle, Washington, United States
- Dates of operation: 1997–present
- Predecessor: BNSF Railway

Technical
- Track gauge: 4 ft 8 1/2 in (1,435 mm) standard gauge
- Length: 3 miles (4.8 km)

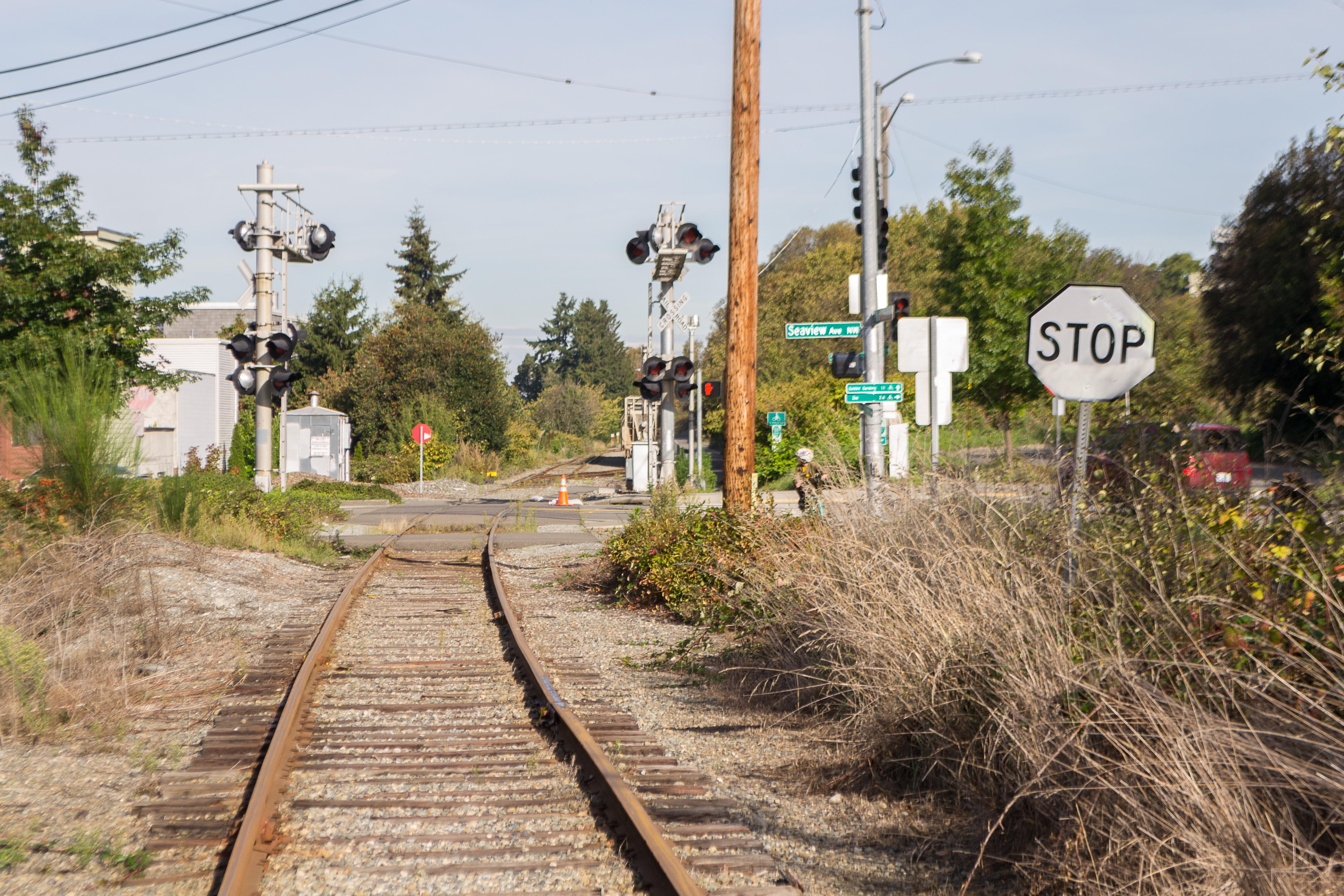
A Ballard Terminal Railroad crossing about ten blocks south of where these tracks join the BNSF Railway

The Ballard Terminal Railroad Company LLC (reporting mark BDTL) operates two Class III short line terminal railroads in western Washington, United States. Founded in 1997 to operate a three-mile spur through Seattle's Ballard neighborhood, the Ballard Terminal Railroad has expanded to operate two additional lines in the Puget Sound area, including Eastside Freight Railroad (reporting mark EFRX) from Snohomish to Woodinville, Washington, and Meeker Southern Railroad (reporting mark MSN), a 5 mi (8.0 km) segment from East Puyallup ("Meeker") to McMillin, Washington. Eastside Freight Railroad has ceased operation as of mid 2020.

== Foundation ==
Burlington Northern Santa Fe Railway stopped offering service on a three-mile spur through Seattle's Ballard neighborhood in January 1997 because only three companies were buying rail shipments, a traffic volume too low to sustain the line according to BNSF. To ensure continued rail service, the three previous customers served by the spur and a fourth company joined with other investors to form the Ballard Terminal Railroad Company, LLC in 1997. The Ballard Terminal Railroad refurbished two locomotives and approached the state of Washington seeking approximately $300,000 in financing to refurbish the track. The railroad began operation in early 1998 with a 1940's era locomotive formerly belonging to the Milwaukee Road.

== Locomotives ==
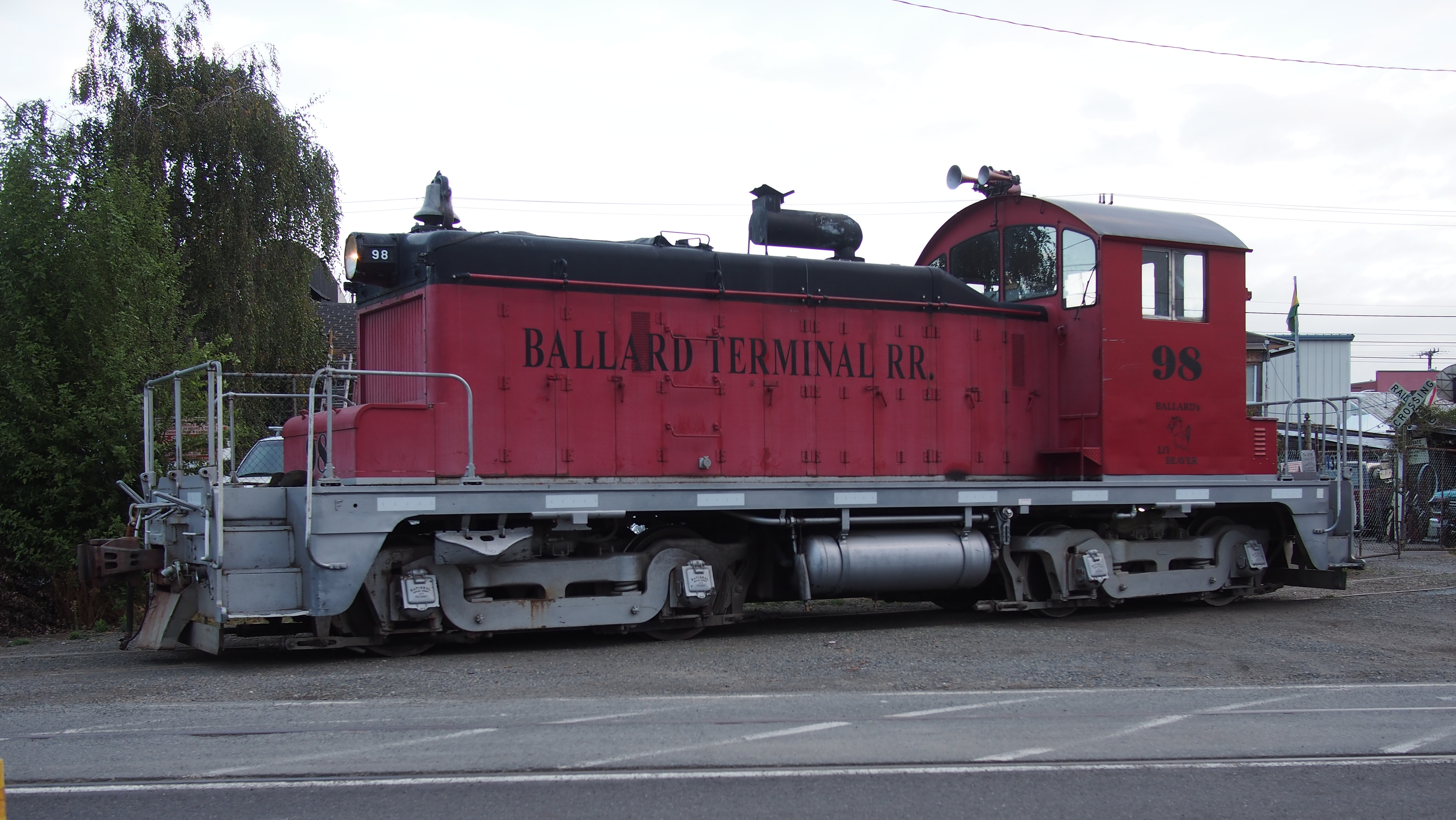
The EMD SW1 locomotive operated by the Ballard Terminal Railroad, nicknamed "Li'l Beaver."

Ballard Terminal Railroad operates one locomotive, a 1939 EMC SW1 locomotive numbered 98 formerly owned by Milwaukee Road. The locomotive's black, red and silver livery and nickname, "Li'l Beaver", pay tribute to the colors and mascot of nearby Ballard High School.

Eastside Freight Railroad once operated an EMD SW1200 locomotive now numbered MSN 109 built in 1963 for the Missouri Pacific. Eastside Freight purchased the locomotive from Tacoma Rail in 2009, which had it listed as surplus property.

Meeker Southern Railroad operates an EMD SW9 locomotive numbered 103, originally owned by Weyerhaeuser .

== Routes ==
The Ballard Terminal Railroad previously operated three rail lines in the greater Seattle area, they now only operate two lines.

=== Ballard Terminal ===
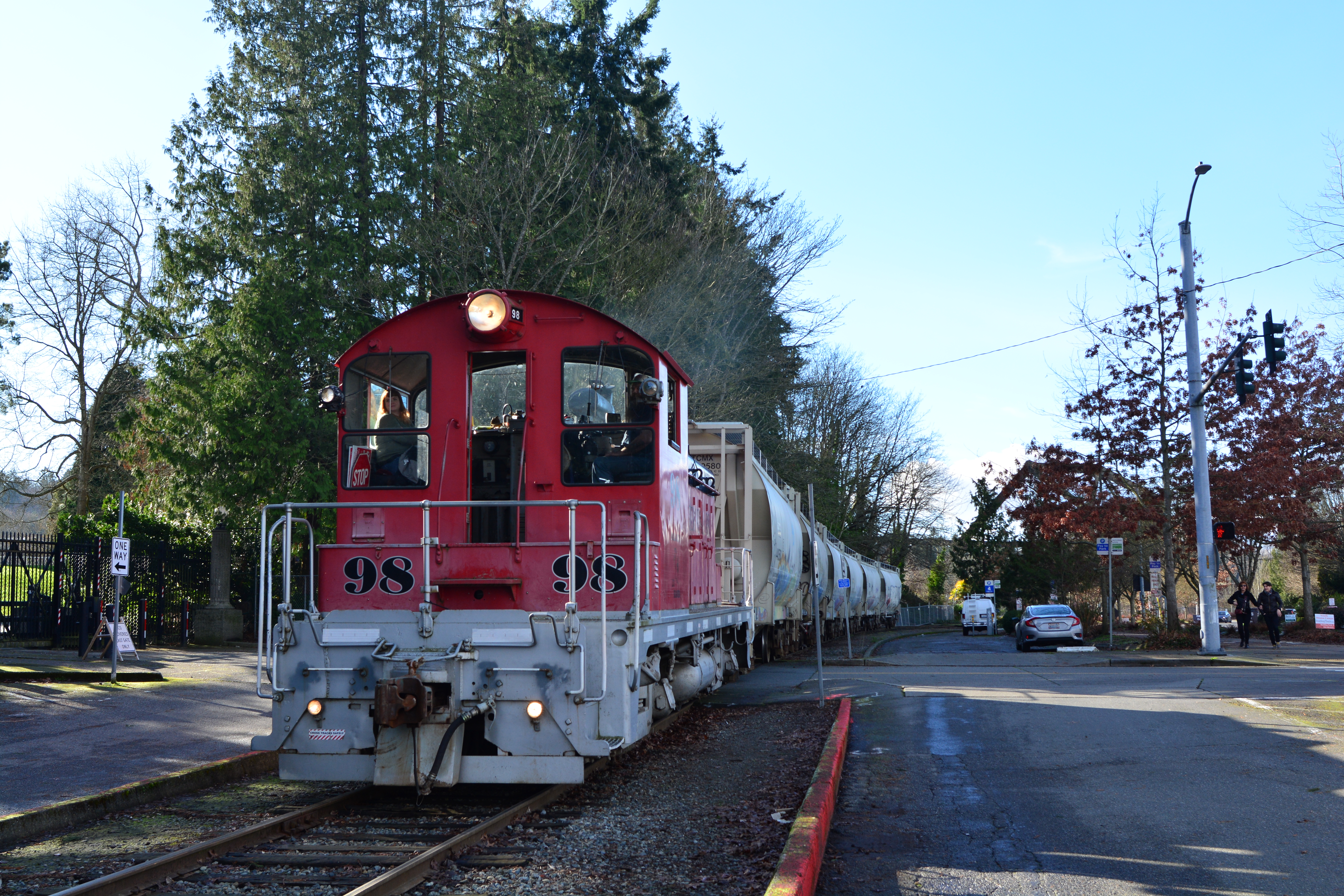
Ballard Terminal Railroad train operating immediately north of the grounds of the Hiram M. Chittenden Locks.

The Ballard Terminal Railroad spur begins at its connection to the BNSF mainline at the Shilshole yard just north of NW 68th Street. The line follows a route along Seaview Avenue NW toward Shilshole Ave NW which the line parallels until NW 45th Street. The line follows NW 45th Street until Leary Way NW, which the line then parallels, passing the Bright Street Yard, then reaching its terminus at NW 40th Street and 6th Avenue NW near the border between the Ballard and Fremont neighborhoods. This route runs parallel to and has multiple crossings with the Burke–Gilman Trail. The Ballard Terminal Railroad owns its tracks outright, but has a 30-year lease on the land underneath, which belongs to the city of Seattle. Most of the railroad was originally part of the Great Northern Railway's main line, moved to the west when the Lake Washington Ship Canal was built. In October 2023, a short stretch of the tracks was paved over, just east of the Ballard Bridge at the intersection of Shilshole Avenue NW and NW 45th Street, thereby cutting the spur in two. Operations continue west of the bridge.

=== Meeker Southern ===
Meeker Southern Railroad's segment runs 5 mi (8.0 km) from East Puyallup ("Meeker") to McMillin, Washington.

=== Eastside Freight ===
Eastside Freight Railroad, which started operation in 2009 on the former BNSF Railway's Woodinville Subdivision, is a segment from Snohomish to Woodinville. Eastside Freight Railroad has ceased operation as of mid 2020.

==== Eastside Rail Corridor ====
On April 1, 2013, Ballard Terminal Railroad filed a federal lawsuit aimed at preventing the City of Kirkland from converting the section of the Eastside Rail Corridor which passes through the city into a trail. On May 3, 2013, Federal District Court Judge Marsha Pechman granted the City of Kirkland's motion to dismiss the case filed by Ballard Terminal Railroad Company seeking to prevent rail salvage on the Cross Kirkland Corridor. In her oral ruling, Judge Pechman stated the Federal District Court did not have jurisdiction to consider Ballard's temporary restraining order (TRO) and that the Surface Transportation Board was the proper forum for adjudicating Ballard's claims. On August 1, 2013, the Surface Transportation Board denied the request by Ballard Terminal Railroad Company to block rail removal along the Cross Kirkland Corridor.

== Operations ==
As of 2008, the Ballard Terminal Railroad serves only one customer on the Ballard Spur, Salmon Bay Sand and Gravel. BNSF delivers cars containing cement, fly ash, stucco and mortar to the Shilshole Yard; the Ballard Terminal Railroad then delivers these cars to Salmon Bay Sand and Gravel two to three times per week, typically at night.

=== Awards ===
In 2007 the Ballard Terminal Railroad received the Jake Award With Distinction, a safety award given by the American Short Line and Regional Railroad Association to railroads with no reportable injuries.
