= Seattle and Walla Walla Railroad =

Former railroad in Seattle

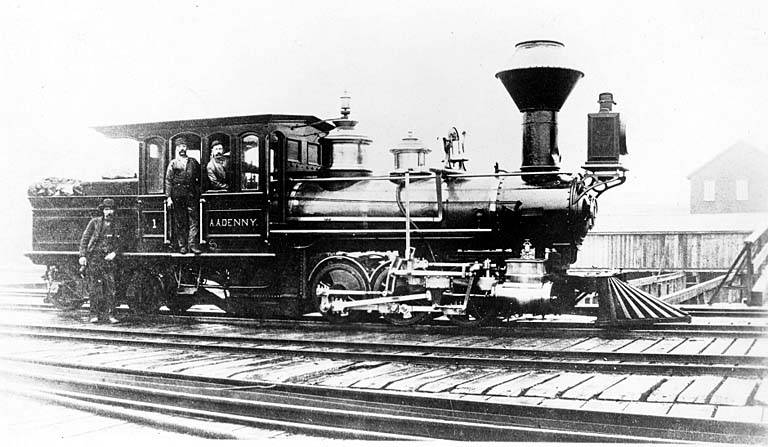
The locomotive A.A. Denny

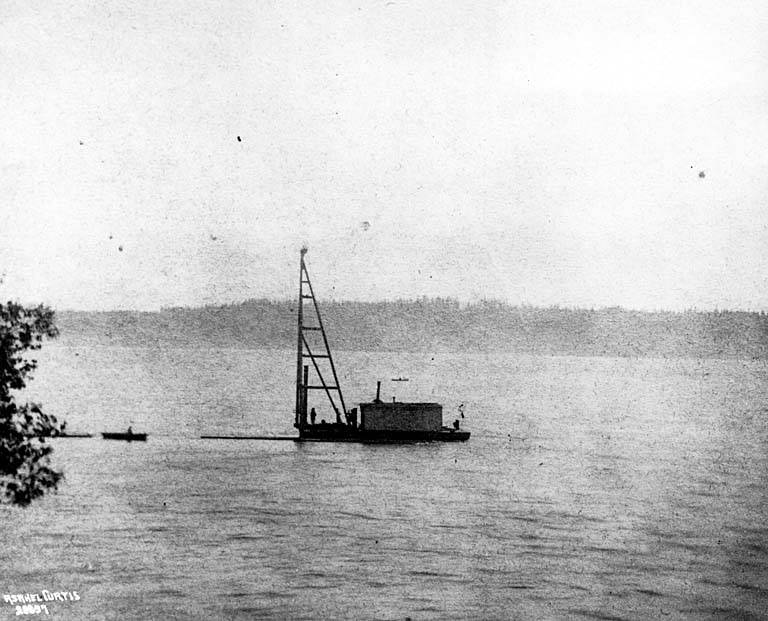
Driving the first pile for the Seattle and Walla Walla

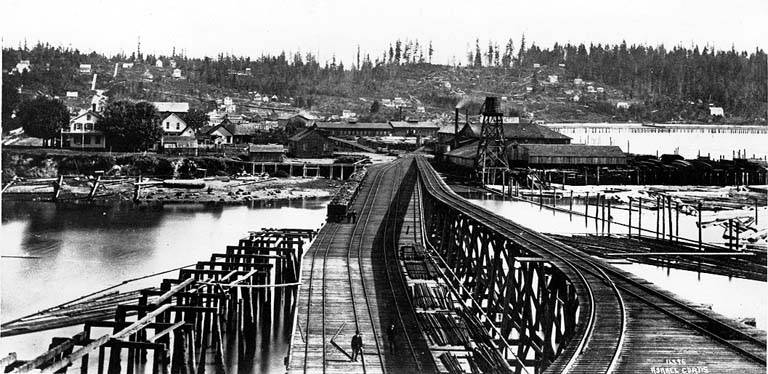
Looking east from the C&PSRR docks in Seattle, 1882

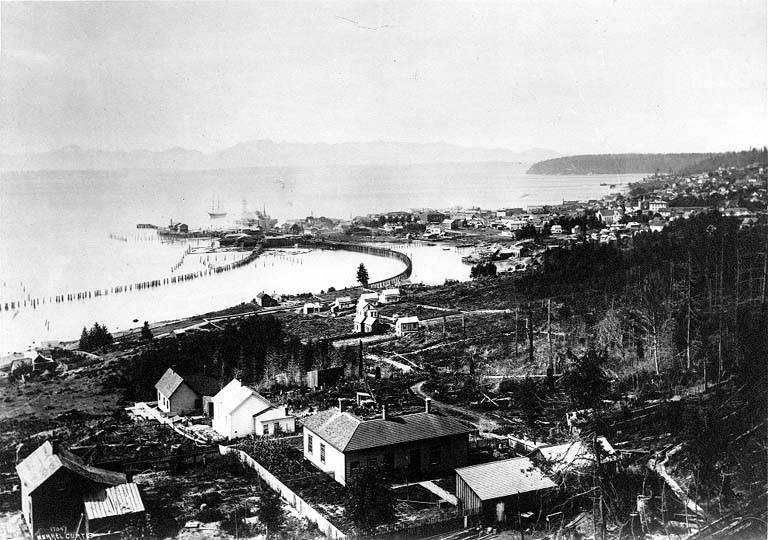
Railway curves along the shore south of Downtown Seattle, 1881

The Seattle and Walla Walla Railroad (earlier Seattle and Walla Walla Railroad and Transportation Company) was a 3 ft (914 mm) narrow gauge railroad and was the first proper railroad to serve Seattle, Washington, preceded only by horse-drawn rail vehicles and by a coal train making the very short haul from Lake Union to Pike Street. Despite its ambitious name, actual construction never went beyond King County, the county of which Seattle itself is the seat. After being sold to Henry Villard's Oregon Improvement Company in 1880 it was renamed the Columbia and Puget Sound Railroad. In 1916, that became the Pacific Coast Railroad Company.

== History ==
=== Seattle and Walla Walla ===
When the Northern Pacific Railway chose nearby Tacoma as its western terminus (1873), many thought that this would condemn Seattle to, at best, a secondary role on Puget Sound. While most of the other towns that were passed over in favor of Tacoma simply accepted their fate, Seattle did not. Selucius Garfielde proposed a railway east through Snoqualmie Pass to the grainfields of Eastern Washington.

The railroad was incorporated September 19, 1873. Its founding trustees were Arthur Denny, John Collins, Franklin Mathias, Angus Mackintosh, Henry Yesler, James McNaught, J. J. McGilvra, J. M. Colman, and Dexter Horton. They ventured to Walla Walla, where they were given a warm welcome, but that city lacked Seattle's concern for the project: they already had land transport to Portland, Oregon, not to mention access to the Columbia River.

J. M. Colman, owner of the Seattle lumber mill founded by Henry Yesler, emerged as the leader of the enterprise. He staked US$20,000 of his own money—a fortune in those days, especially during the slow recovery from the Panic of 1873—on the condition that other Seattle businessmen would loan the enterprise at least twice that sum. Colman brought in labor contractor Chin Gee Hee, who organized cheap Chinese labor to continue the construction. (Chin would eventually become a railway entrepreneur in his native China.)

Despite Walla Walla's lack of interest, construction began on May 1, 1874, at Steele's Landing in Georgetown, the present-day intersection of E. Marginal Way S. and S. Lucille St., which was then near the mouth of the Duwamish River, later re-channeled and straightened. Twelve miles of track had been completed by October of that year, entirely through volunteer labor by the men of Seattle. The line reached the coal fields of Renton in 1877, with the first train running on March 7 and regular commercial runs commencing October 15. Coal made the line profitable, even if it did nothing to link Seattle to the national rail infrastructure.

The most difficult part of building the line was the trestle ran south from the King Street Coal Wharf, carrying trains through the tide flats that would later be filled to form Seattle's Industrial District. Joe Surber sunk numerous piles into the flats, using his pile driver. The resulting trestle was short-lived, though: shipworms attacked the pilings, and this portion of the line had to be replaced by the successor Columbia and Puget Sound Railroad less than five years after it was initially built.

On January 18, 1878 the railroad made it as far as the coal fields of Newcastle, ultimately 22.5 miles (36.2 km) of railway with five locomotives, two passenger cars and sixty freight cars, but never attracted the capitalization that would take it anywhere near the city of Walla Walla from which it took half its name.

Henry Villard's Oregon Improvement Company bought the Seattle and Walla Walla November 25, 1880, combined it with the Seattle Coal and Transportation Co., and renamed it the Columbia and Puget Sound Railroad. The sale was quite profitable for the line's owners, but still did little to connect Seattle to the national land transportation grid.

=== Columbia and Puget Sound ===
The Columbia and Puget Sound Railroad Company (C&PSRR), successor to the Seattle and Walla Walla, was incorporated November 26, 1880, the day after the purchase. Like its predecessor, the C&PSRR continued to lay track in the coal-rich terrain of Western Washington, mainly extending lines south and east from Renton via Black Diamond to Franklin (December 1884), but also extending service a short distance from Newcastle to nearby Coal Creek in December 1881. Additional short lines out of Black Diamond would eventually go to Denny (renamed Bruce in 1897) and 1.65 miles (2.66 km) to Kummer; the latter opened no later than June 30, 1903); about halfway between Renton and Black Diamond, a line was extended from Maple Valley to Taylor (a company town owned by the Denny Clay Company) around May 1893. The C&SPRR eventually had 60.26 miles (96.98 km) of track.

The C&PSRR gave Seattle at least a tenuous link to major railways to its south and east. At Maple Valley, it connected to a line owned by the Milwaukee Road, the Chicago, & Puget Sound Railway Company. Beginning July 1, 1884, a third rail on C&PSRR track from Black River Junction north to Argo allowed the Northern Pacific to run their wide-gauge trains on C&PSRR's otherwise narrow-gauge track, and reach Seattle from the south with their Puget Sound Shore Railroad.

The Puget Sound Shore Railroad was never really an adequate connection to the nation's railroad network. The line was built from the Black River Junction via Kent to Stuck Junction (about halfway between Sumner and Kent), leading in theory to the Northern Pacific's main terminal at Tacoma, but the Northern Pacific largely declined to operate the line. The name "Stuck Junction" became all too apt. "[S]ervice was unpredictable and sometimes absent altogether," charges were high, and no break bulk cargo was allowed (an individual merchant had to ship and receive by the carload). This situation drove Seattle to look at the possibility of connecting north, leading to the creation of the Seattle, Lake Shore & Eastern. There were various degrees of accommodation at various times, but it would not be until 1902 that a genuinely amicable agreement was reached with Northern Pacific, with details finalized in 1903.

The Great Seattle Fire in June 1889 destroyed C&PSRR's Seattle station, shops, roundhouse, coal bunkers, all of its wharves, four freight cars and a locomotive. The railroad was up and running again by the end of the year. The Panic of 1893 severely impacted the Oregon Improvement Company, which went into receivership in 1895, emerging in 1897 as the Pacific Coast Company, a name the reflected its inclusion of the Pacific Coast Steamship Company.

C&PSRR upgraded to standard gauge, work that was completed in November 1897. The 1903 agreement with Northern Pacific gave C&PSRR a good route to access Pacific Coast Steamship Company's new Seattle coal pier at Dearborn Street, where they built a new roundhouse just off of Railroad Avenue (later Alaskan Way).

In 1909, following up on a 1906 agreement, the Milwaukee Road was extended similar trackage rights from the south to what had been granted to the Puget Sound Shore Railroad. By 1913, the C&PSRR was operating 11 locomotives, 8 passenger cars, 152 freight cars, and 236 coal cars. The C&PSRR was consolidated into the Pacific Coast Railroad Company on March 26, 1916.

=== Pacific Coast Railroad Company ===
The Pacific Coast Railroad Company was incorporated November 27, 1897, but did not operate until March 23, 1916. The line from Renton to Newcastle and Coal Creek was closed in 1933. The last of the extensions out of Black Diamond, to Franklin, was closed in 1936. In 1945 the line from Maple Valley to Taylor was closed, and in 1947 the stretch between Maple Valley and Henry's shut as well, leaving only the lines from Seattle via Black River Junction and Renton to Maple Valley, and from Henry's to Black Diamond, a total of about 30 miles (48 km) of track.

In 1951, the Pacific Coast Railroad became a subsidiary of the Great Northern. It was sold to Burlington Northern (now part of the BNSF Railway) March 2, 1970.

== See also ==
- Puget Sound Shore Railroad
