= Moulton Falls Regional Park =

Clark County recreational park

Coordinates: 45.832°N 122.394°W

Moulton Falls Regional Park is a Clark County recreational park in Yacolt, Washington, United States.

The location is notable for its bridge and is a popular trailing, and swimming destination. Th flow is 60 deep from the East Fork Lewis River. It is also a historical location known for preservation by the state, and the bridge has existed since the late 1970s. It officially became recognized as a state park in 2023.

== Incidents ==
In July 2014, a 44-year-old Vancouver man jumped off the rocks and into the river and was submerged for too long, thus eventually drowning. The paramedics were not able to revive him.

In August 2018, a teenage girl was pushed off the bridge by her friend, resulting in the rupture of her rib cage. The friend was charged with reckless endangerment, pleaded guilty, and was sentenced to two days in county jail. The video of the incident received nationwide media coverage.
