= Fruitvale, Washington =

Unincorporated community in Washington, United States

- Unincorporated community
- Location within Yakima County Location within Washington (state)
- Coordinates: 46°37′04″N 120°33′11″W
- Country: United States
- State: Washington
- County: Yakima
- Elevation: 1,132 ft (345 m)
- Time zone: UTC-8 (Pacific (PST))
  - Summer (DST): UTC-7 (PDT)
- ZIP code: 98902
- Area code: 509
- GNIS feature ID: 1512229

Fruitvale is an unincorporated community in Yakima County, Washington, United States, located within the north city limits of Yakima.

The community was established around 1906 around a train station of the North Yakima and Valley Railway Company. The name was chosen because of the importance of fruit production to Yakima Valley's economy and the word 'vale' meaning valley.
