= Veazie, Washington =

Unincorporated community in Washington, US

- Unincorporated community
- Location in Washington and the United States Veazie (the United States)
- Coordinates: 47°14′51″N 121°57′17″W
- Country: United States
- State: Washington
- County: King
- Elevation: 745 ft (227 m)
- Time zone: UTC-8 (Pacific (PST))
  - Summer (DST): UTC-7 (PDT)
- Area code: 360
- GNIS feature ID: 1527692

Veazie is an unincorporated community in King County, in the U.S. state of Washington.

== History ==
A post office called Veazie was established in 1890, and remained in operation until 1892. The community was named after Thomas Veazie, a businessperson in the logging industry.
