= Seattle and North Coast Railroad =

Logo of the Seattle and North Coast Railroad

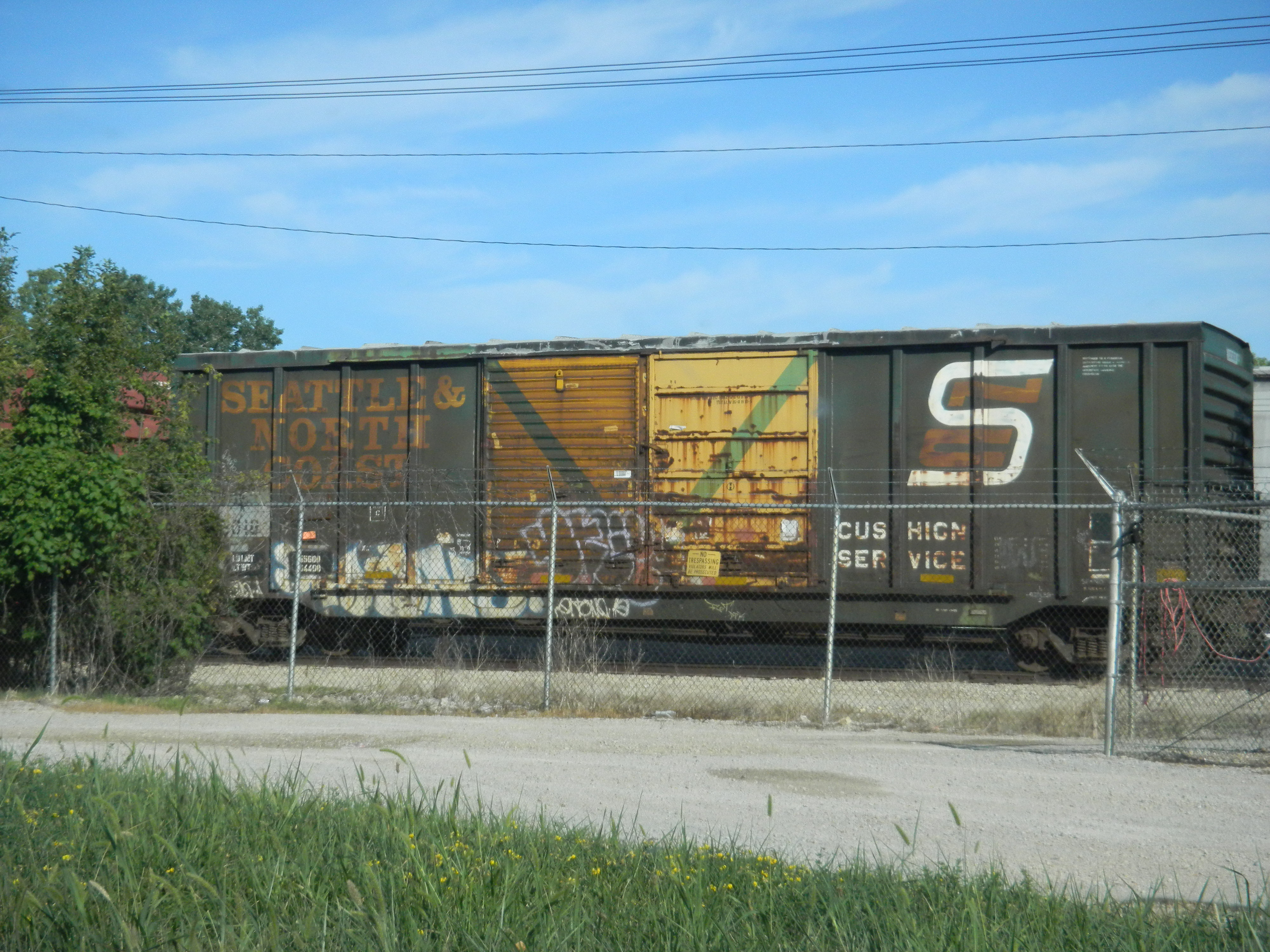
SNC boxcar with CRANDIC markings at Cedar Rapids, Iowa

The Seattle and North Coast Railroad (SNCT) was a short-line railroad that operated on the northern part of the Olympic Peninsula in Washington State from Port Angeles to Port Townsend. The line was a "rail island" with no outside rail connection to a mainline railroad. Instead, rail equipment was brought in via barges that traveled between Port Townsend and Seattle.

At one time there were actually 3 different Companies (the Chicago, Milwaukee, St. Paul and Pacific Railroad, Port Townsend and Western, and the Port Angeles and Western) controlling the lines which ran from west of Sekiu, Washington. and west of Lake Crescent east to Port Townsend with a spur that went south toward the Hood Canal. The consolidated Peninsula Line was part of the Milwaukee, St. Paul and Pacific RR (MILW), which at one time was the longest electrified railroad in the world (the Peninsula portion was not electrified). A long bankruptcy and abandonment process for the Milwaukee created service and maintenance issue throughout the system. Seattle-based private entrepreneurs purchased this section of railroad from the Milwaukee's bankruptcy court. As the new carrier started, an extended period of weak markets for the pulp, paper, plywood and lumber markets, produced on the Peninsula, seriously weakened the enterprise. New efforts to improve the rail freight loadings were met with stiff competition from a barge-to-rail service (Puget Sound Freight Lines) and Piggyback services to the main-line rail carriers (Union Pacific and Burlington Northern) proved overwhelming to the highly leveraged new company. Steadily increasing maintenance costs, after years of neglect by the prior operator, finally caused a complete service shutdown followed by abandonment in 1984. The rails, ties and equipment were removed in 1987. Many adjoining property owners and public land holding agencies sought a legal end to the right-of-ways on the majority of the Line. This also included Pier 2 in Seattle's Elliott Bay, key to the Port of Seattle's expansion plan.

Today significant sections of the abandoned railroad between Port Townsend and Port Angeles has been dedicated as a rails-to-trails route known as the Olympic Discovery Trail.

== History ==
Portions of the rail-line were constructed in the early 1900s by various groups. The citizens of Port Angeles knew that in order to prosper, a rail line would have to link the town to the rest of the country. The first was by the U.S. Army during World War I an effort to log the spruce forests around Lake Crescent for warplane production. This segment was abandoned in 1954. Later, the rail line from Port Angeles to Port Townsend would come under the control of the Milwaukee Road until its bankruptcy in 1980 when it was taken over by the Seattle and North Coast Railroad until its abandonment in 1984.
