= Los Angeles Junction Railway =

Railway track service

Los Angeles Junction Railway (LAJ Railway)
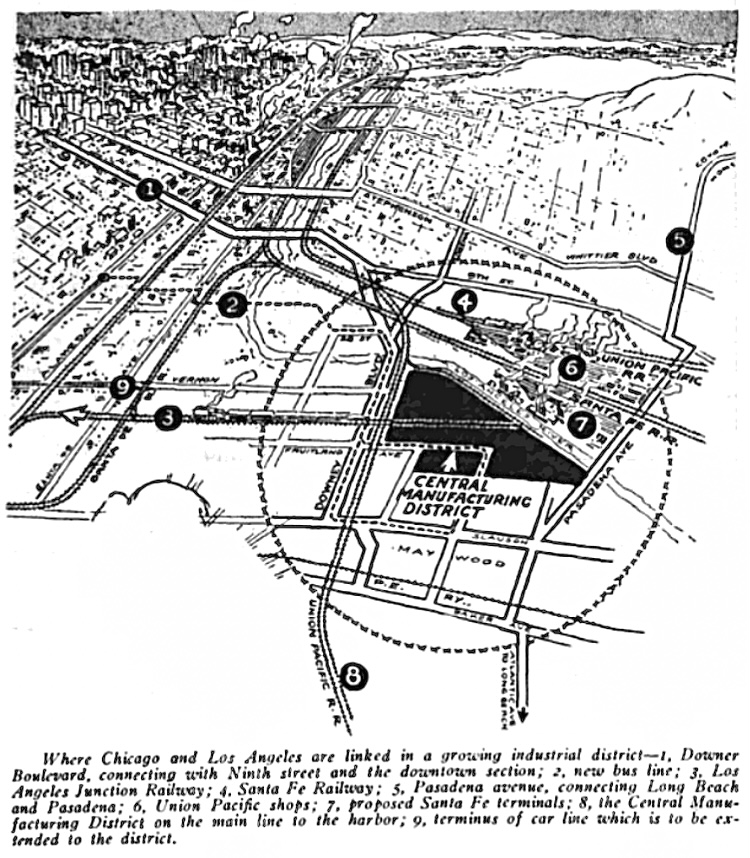
- Los Angeles Central Manufacturing District map with rail lines (1923)

Overview
- Headquarters: Vernon, California
- Reporting mark: LAJ
- Locale: Los Angeles, California
- Dates of operation: May 26, 1923–present

Technical
- Track gauge: 4 ft 8 1/2 in (1,435 mm) standard gauge

Other
- Website: www.lajrailway.com

The Los Angeles Junction Railway (reporting mark LAJ) is a wholly owned subsidiary of the BNSF Railway and provides rail switching service on 64 miles of track in Los Angeles County, California.

Its tracks are in the small industrial city of Vernon and adjacent industrial areas, southeast of Downtown Los Angeles.

== History ==
The LAJ was planned in the early 1920s as the switching railroad for the Central Manufacturing District in the cities of Vernon, Maywood, Bell and Commerce.

Today, the LAJ Railway is a neutral switching railroad and receives interchange from two Class I Railroads, the BNSF Railway and the Union Pacific Railroad.
