= Washington and Idaho Railway =

Shortline railroad connecting lines in Washington and Idaho

Overview
- Headquarters: Marshall, Washington
- Reporting mark: WIR
- Locale: Washington and Idaho
- Dates of operation: 2006–2019
- Predecessor: Spokane, Spangle & Palouse RR

Technical
- Track gauge: 4 ft 8 1/2 in (1,435 mm) standard gauge

The Washington and Idaho Railway (reporting mark WIR) was a shortline railroad that operated in the area south of Spokane, Washington, connecting the BNSF Railway at Marshall to Palouse, Washington, Harvard, Idaho, and Moscow, Idaho. It began operations in 2006 on ex-Northern Pacific Railway and Washington, Idaho and Montana Railway trackage formerly operated by the Palouse River and Coulee City Railroad, which had acquired it from the Burlington Northern Railroad in 1996. The railroad ceased operations in 2019 as a new operator gained control of the line.

== History ==
The Spokane and Palouse Railway, a predecessor of the Northern Pacific Railway (NP), completed a line from the NP's main line at Marshall south to Genesee, Idaho in 1888, and a branch from Pullman to Juliaetta, Idaho in 1891 (extended to Lewiston by the NP in 1898). The Washington, Idaho and Montana Railway (WI&M) finished its line in 1907, extending east from Palouse to Purdue, Idaho. The Chicago, Milwaukee, St. Paul and Pacific Railroad (Milwaukee Road) gained control of the WI&M in 1962, and sold the property to the Burlington Northern Railroad (BN), successor to the NP, in 1980. The BN sold the lines from Marshall to Arrow, Idaho and Palouse to Bovill, Idaho to the newly created Palouse River and Coulee City Railroad (PCC), which began operations in September 1996. It subsequently abandoned the ends from Harvard to Bovill and Moscow to Arrow, and in September 2006 the Washington and Idaho Railway began operating the remainder under contract. The Washington State Department of Transportation bought the trackage within that state in June 2007, and kept the Washington and Idaho Railway as the operator. It also has access to an ex-Union Pacific Railroad line west from Pullman to Risbeck (also formerly owned by the PCC) for railcar storage.

In mid 2019, the WIR ceased operations as the contract was up for the state owned lines. A new operator took over in August 2019 and is called the Spokane, Spangle & Palouse Railway (SSP).
