= Willapa Electric Company =

Electric railway and utility company in Washington, United States

The Willapa Electric Company was an electric railway and electric utility company incorporated on August 2, 1913, as successor to the Willapa Harbor Railway, a 5.60-mile (9.01 km) electric street railway extending from Raymond to South Bend, Washington, in addition to other public utilities in the area: Twin City Electric Company and South Bend Electric Company. The company was to be capitalized at $400,000. The organizers were J S Thornton, R L Fisher and M M Fisher. The company was controlled by the Cities Service Power and Light Company. Rail operations continued until July 1930.

In 1939, the company sold part of its electricity transmission and distribution network to the Bonneville Dam.

In 1940, the company and Grays Harbor Railway and Light Company were both reportedly subsidiaries of Federal Light and Traction.
