= Columbia Basin Railroad =

Common freight carrier in Washington, USA

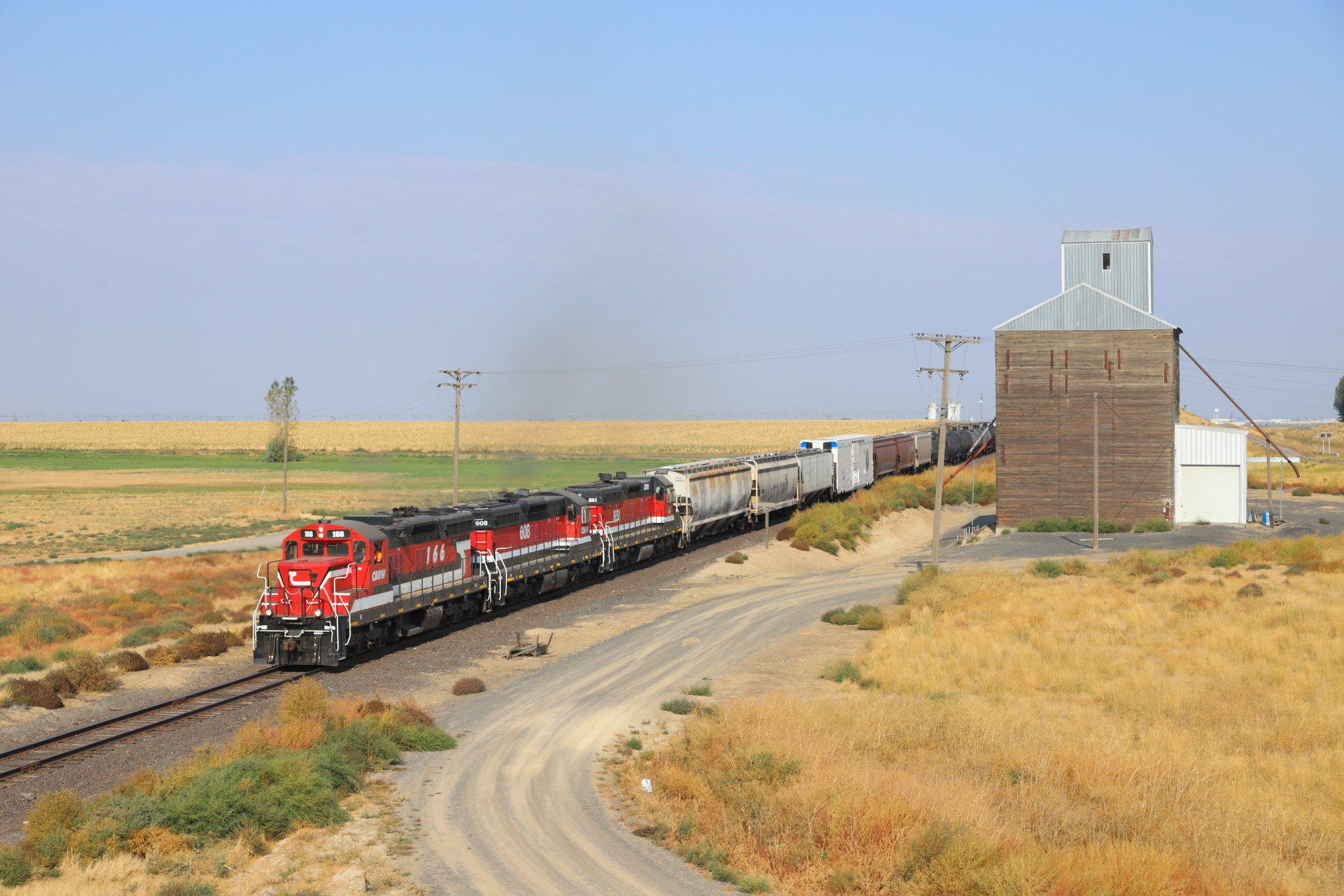
- CBRW freight train in Koren, Adams County, on September 30, 2022.

Overview
- Reporting mark: CBRW, CBRR
- Locale: Eastern Washington
- Dates of operation: 1986–present
- Predecessor: Burlington Northern Railroad

Technical
- Track gauge: 1,435 mm (4 ft 8 1/2 in)

Other
- Website: https://jag-transport.com/columbia-basin-railroad/

The Columbia Basin Railroad (CBRR) was founded in 1986 as a common freight carrier that operates between Moses Lake and Connell in the state of Washington, USA.

== Route ==
The CBRR connects the Washington communities of Moses Lake, Wheeler, Schrag, Warden, Othello and Connell.

== History ==
The Columbia Basin Railroad was established in 1986 as part of the Washington Central Railroad Company, which bought 230 miles (370 km) of railway in Central Washington from Burlington Northern. It was the second largest railroad in the state by route-mileage. The company, owned by Eric Temple, also owned the Spirit of Washington Dinner Train operating in King County, Washington. The line was acquired by Jaguar Transport Holdings in August 2025.

== Traffic ==
According to Railway Age, the CBRR was the busiest shortline railroad in eastern Washington in 2014, with over 10,000 carloads annually of agricultural and industrial shipments.

== See also ==
- List of Washington (state) railroads
