= Longview, Portland and Northern Railway =

Former American short-line railroad

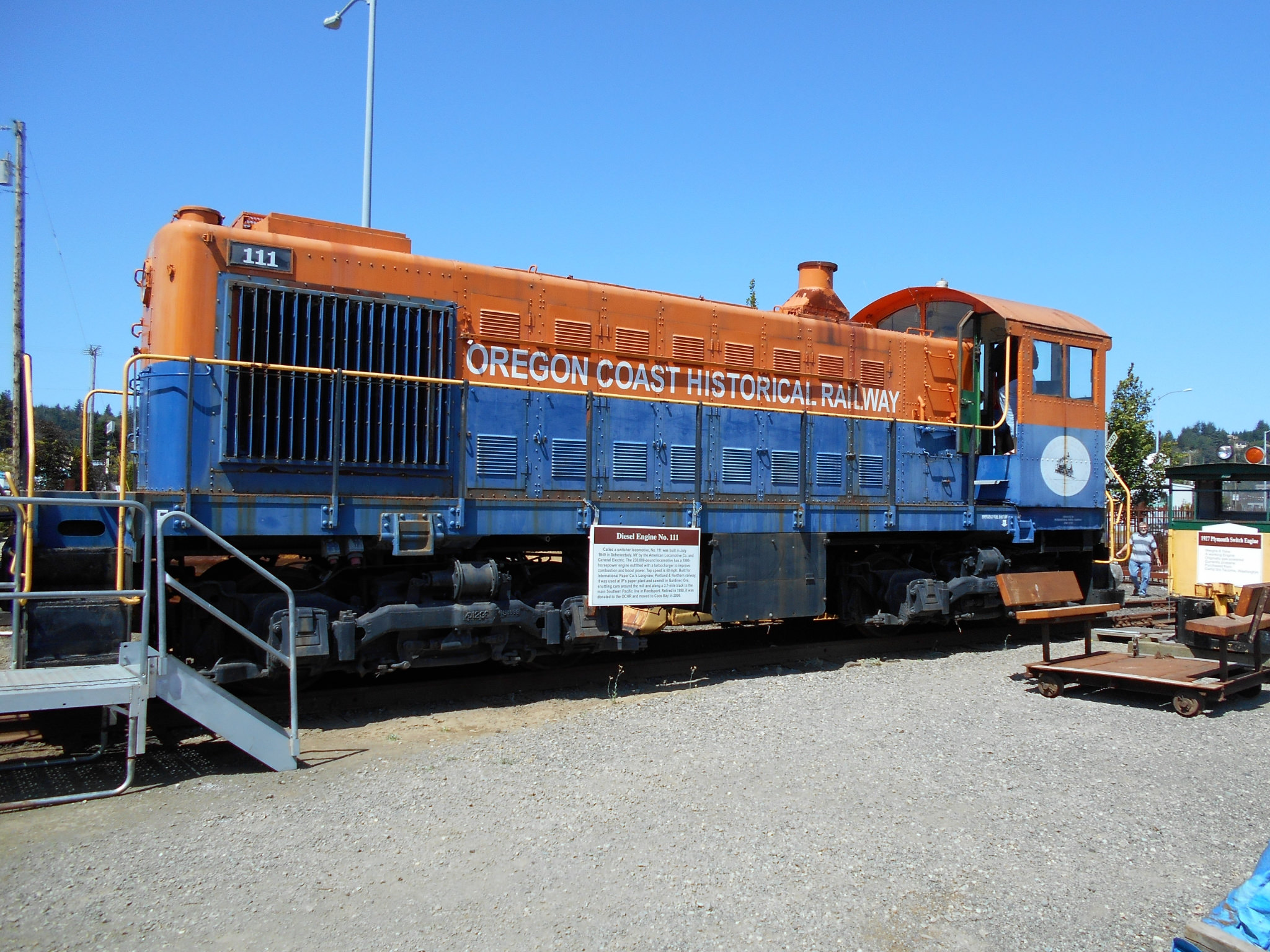
Ex-LP&N switcher #111 at the Oregon Coast Historical Railway in 2015

The Longview, Portland and Northern Railway was a historic railroad operation in the U.S. states of Oregon and Washington. It was founded by timber baron Robert A. Long, the founder of Longview, Washington. The company was incorporated in 1922.

Beginning in 1954, the "LP&N" operated a three-mile-long (4.8 km) short-line railroad on the Oregon Coast that connected the International Paper plant to the Southern Pacific interchange just outside Gardiner, Oregon. The paper plant shut down in 1999 and was razed. All that remains of the plant is the railroad tracks and shop buildings.

In 2006, Robert W. Larson, president of the Oregon, Pacific and Eastern Railway (OP&E), filed with the State of Oregon for the LP&N. According to Mr. Larson, the LP&N will be a joint operation with OP&E. The "Blue Goose" logo will now become a part of the LP&N.

At least one of the railroad's steam locomotives, 2-8-0 No. 680, is known to survive in active service on the Virginia & Truckee Railroad as V&T No. 29.
