= Craigmont, Idaho =

- City
- Location of Craigmont in Lewis County, Idaho.
- Coordinates: 46°14′32″N 116°28′22″W
- Country: United States
- State: Idaho
- County: Lewis

Area
  - Total: 0.78 sq mi (2.02 km^{2})
  - Land: 0.78 sq mi (2.01 km^{2})
  - Water: 0 sq mi (0.00 km^{2})
- Elevation: 3,747 ft (1,142 m)

Population (2020)
  - Total: 458
  - Density: 629.0/sq mi (242.86/km^{2})
- Time zone: UTC-8 (Pacific (PST))
  - Summer (DST): UTC-7 (PDT)
- ZIP code: 83523
- Area code: 208
- FIPS code: 16-19270
- GNIS feature ID: 2410256
- Website: cityofcraigmontid.com

Craigmont is a city in the northwest United States in Lewis County, Idaho. Located on the Camas Prairie in north central Idaho, it is within the Nez Perce Indian Reservation. As of the 2020 census, Craigmont had a population of 458.

== History ==
The city is named for Colonel William Craig (1809–69), a mountain man who had a Nez Perce wife. He settled at Lapwai near his father-in-law Hin-mah-tute-ke-kaikt or James in 1840 when he gave up being a fur trapper due to the collapse of the market for beaver.

The Nez Perce Reservation was opened to white settlement 131 years ago in 1895, and a town named "Chicago," a mile west of the current Craigmont, was founded in 1898. In response to not getting their mail from the post office, it was renamed "Ilo" four years later, after Ilo Leggett, daughter of town founder and merchant W.O. Leggett. A fire burnt the town in 1904 and shortly thereafter the Camas Prairie Railroad bypassed the town and started a settlement, platted by Lewiston financier John P. Vollmer, on the northeast side of the railroad tracks, and he named it "Vollmer." Ilo responded and moved its community to the southwest side of the tracks, adjacent to Vollmer. After a decade-long feud and the consolidation of the school districts, the communities merged in 1920 to become Craigmont.

== Geography ==
Craigmont is located on the Camas Prairie, and entirely within the Nez Perce Indian Reservation.

According to the United States Census Bureau, the city has a total area of 0.76 square miles (1.97 km^{2}), all of it land.

=== Climate ===
The climate in this area has mild differences between highs and lows, and there is adequate rainfall year-round. According to the Köppen Climate Classification system, Craigmont has a humid continental climate, abbreviated "Dfb" on climate maps.

Climate data for Craigmont (1950-1996)
Month	Jan	Feb	Mar	Apr	May	Jun	Jul	Aug	Sep	Oct	Nov	Dec	Year
Record high °F (°C)	55 (13)	66 (19)	69 (21)	83 (28)	89 (32)	94 (34)	97 (36)	96 (36)	95 (35)	84 (29)	69 (21)	57 (14)	97 (36)
Mean daily maximum °F (°C)	35 (2)	39 (4)	47.1 (8.4)	54 (12)	61.6 (16.4)	69.1 (20.6)	77.3 (25.2)	78.2 (25.7)	69.3 (20.7)	57 (14)	40.5 (4.7)	33.5 (0.8)	55.1 (12.8)
Mean daily minimum °F (°C)	20.9 (−6.2)	21.4 (−5.9)	27.7 (−2.4)	32 (0)	37.6 (3.1)	43 (6)	47 (8)	46.3 (7.9)	39.7 (4.3)	32.9 (0.5)	25.4 (−3.7)	18.9 (−7.3)	32.7 (0.4)
Record low °F (°C)	−19 (−28)	−27 (−33)	−2 (−19)	17 (−8)	23 (−5)	29 (−2)	31 (−1)	26 (−3)	19 (−7)	10 (−12)	−13 (−25)	−28 (−33)	−28 (−33)
Average precipitation inches (mm)	1.61 (41)	1.48 (38)	2.18 (55)	2.34 (59)	2.8 (71)	2.07 (53)	1.55 (39)	1 (25)	1.26 (32)	1.53 (39)	2.29 (58)	1.46 (37)	21.58 (548)
Average snowfall inches (cm)	14.1 (36)	10 (25)	8.7 (22)	3.6 (9.1)	0.9 (2.3)	0 (0)	0 (0)	0 (0)	0.1 (0.25)	1.2 (3.0)	10.6 (27)	11.9 (30)	61 (150)
Average precipitation days	13	12	15	14	14	12	8	6	7	10	17	14	142
Source: WRCC

== Transportation ==
=== Railroad ===
Four miles (7 km) south of the city is Lawyers Creek Canyon, with large railroad trestles of the Camas Prairie Railroad, whose second subdivision arrived on the Camas Prairie in 1908 and extended to Grangeville the following year. The largest is the massive century-old steel trestle, 1,488 feet (454 m) in length and its track 287 feet (87 m) above the creek. After several ownership changes since 1998, the line from Spalding is now operated by BG&CM Railroad and terminates in Cottonwood. Passenger service on the Camas Prairie ended in 1955. Lawyers Canyon is named after Chief Lawyer (1801–76) of the Nez Perce, nicknamed for his skill in dealing with the encroaching whites; he is buried in Kamiah.

=== Highways ===
- - US 95 - to Lewiston, Moscow (north) and Grangeville, Boise (via) (south)
- - SH-62 - to Nezperce (east)

Northbound U.S. Route 95 was formerly routed westward through Craigmont as Main Street, then resumed westward toward Winchester. The highway was re-routed in 1991 and now bypasses Craigmont on its south side. Southbound, the new route between Craigmont and Ferdinand stays out of the canyon, crossing it on a 919-foot (280 m) bridge (photo) which opened in October 1991 and passes over the site of the previous 82-foot (25 m) bridge, built in 1948. After the bridge, the southbound highway passes to the east of Ferdinand, a new routing completed in 1993.

Eastbound from Craigmont, State Highway 62 connects to Nezperce, the county seat.

== Demographics ==
Historical population
Census	Pop.	Note	%±
1930	496		—
1940	528		6.5%
1950	594		12.5%
1960	703		18.4%
1970	554		−21.2%
1980	617		11.4%
1990	542		−12.2%
2000	556		2.6%
2010	501		−9.9%
2020	458		−8.6%
2019 (est.)	489		−2.4%
U.S. Decennial Census

=== 2010 census ===
As of the census of 2010, there were 501 people, 230 households, and 149 families residing in the city. The population density was 659.2 inhabitants per square mile (254.5/km^{2}). There were 261 housing units at an average density of 343.4 per square mile (132.6/km^{2}). The racial makeup of the city was 95.2% White, 0.6% Native American, 1.0% Asian, 0.2% Pacific Islander, 1.6% from other races, and 1.4% from two or more races. Hispanic or Latino of any race were 2.0% of the population.

There were 230 households, of which 21.3% had children under the age of 18 living with them, 54.3% were married couples living together, 7.4% had a female householder with no husband present, 3.0% had a male householder with no wife present, and 35.2% were non-families. 31.7% of all households were made up of individuals, and 17.4% had someone living alone who was 65 years of age or older. The average household size was 2.18 and the average family size was 2.68.

The median age in the city was 49.4 years. 18.2% of residents were under the age of 18; 6.2% were between the ages of 18 and 24; 18.2% were from 25 to 44; 37.8% were from 45 to 64; and 19.8% were 65 years of age or older. The gender makeup of the city was 49.7% male and 50.3% female.

=== 2000 census ===
As of the census of 2000, there were 556 people, 225 households, and 157 families residing in the city. The population density was 743.8 inhabitants per square mile (287.2/km^{2}). There were 248 housing units at an average density of 331.8 per square mile (128.1/km^{2}). The racial makeup of the city was 97.12% White, 1.44% Native American, 0.36% Asian, 0.90% from other races, and 0.18% from two or more races. Hispanic or Latino of any race were 0.54% of the population.

There were 225 households, out of which 31.6% had children under the age of 18 living with them, 60.9% were married couples living together, 6.2% had a female householder with no husband present, and 30.2% were non-families. 23.6% of all households were made up of individuals, and 10.7% had someone living alone who was 65 years of age or older. The average household size was 2.47 and the average family size was 2.94.

In the city, the population was spread out, with 26.6% under the age of 18, 5.8% from 18 to 24, 28.1% from 25 to 44, 24.3% from 45 to 64, and 15.3% who were 65 years of age or older. The median age was 39 years. For every 100 females, there were 109.0 males. For every 100 females age 18 and over, there were 105.0 males.

The median income for a household in the city was $31,806, and the median income for a family was $36,719. Males had a median income of $36,250 versus $21,250 for females. The per capita income for the city was $16,548. About 12.9% of families and 13.0% of the population were below the poverty line, including 11.9% of those under age 18 and 11.5% of those age 65 or over.

== Education ==
Craigmont is the home of Highland High School, with an average of 20 to 25 students per graduating class. The Huskies compete in athletics at the IHSAA Class 1A level. The Highland Joint School District #305 was established in 1962 and includes Craigmont, Winchester, Melrose, and Reubens. The current campus of the school was constructed in 1952.
