= List of Idaho railroads =

The following railroads operate in Idaho.

== Common freight carriers ==
- Canadian Pacific Kansas City Railway (CPKC)
- City of Boise Railroad (COB)
- BG&CM Railroad (BGCM)
- BNSF Railway (BNSF)
- Boise Valley Railroad (BVRR) (WATX)
- Eastern Idaho Railroad (EIRR) (WATX)
- Frontier Rail (FTRX)
- Great Northwest Railroad (GRNW) (WATX)
- Idaho and Sedalia Transportation Company (ISR)
- Idaho Northern and Pacific Railroad (INPR)
- Pend Oreille Valley Railroad (POVA)
- St. Maries River Railroad (STMA)
- Union Pacific Railroad (UP)
- Washington, Idaho & Montana Railway LLC (WI&M)

== Passenger carriers ==
- Amtrak (AMTK)
- Silverwood Theme Park Steam Train

== Private ==
- Idaho National Laboratory

== Defunct railroads ==
Name	Mark	System (Note: This is one or more of the Class I railroads that the railroad became part of, if any.)	From	To	Successor	Notes
Alder Creek Railway			1912	1918	N/A	
Boise City Railway and Terminal Company		UP	1893	1910	Oregon Short Line Railroad	
Boise, Nampa and Owyhee Railway		UP	1896	1907	Idaho Northern Railway	
Burlington Northern Inc.	BN		1970	1981	Burlington Northern Railroad	
Burlington Northern Railroad	BN		1981	1996	Burlington Northern and Santa Fe Railway	
Camas Prairie RailNet	CSP		1998	2004	Great Northwest Railroad	
Camas Prairie Railroad	CSP	NP/ UP	1909	1998	Camas Prairie RailNet	
Canyon Creek Railroad		NP	1887	1888	Coeur d'Alene Railway and Navigation Company	
Central Idaho Railroad		UP	1910	1914	Oregon Short Line Railroad	
Chicago, Milwaukee and Puget Sound Railway		MILW	1909	1912	Chicago, Milwaukee and St. Paul Railway	
Chicago, Milwaukee and St. Paul Railway		MILW	1912	1928	Chicago, Milwaukee, St. Paul and Pacific Railroad	
Chicago, Milwaukee and St. Paul Railway of Idaho		MILW	1906	1908	Chicago, Milwaukee and St. Paul Railway of Washington	
Chicago, Milwaukee and St. Paul Railway of Washington		MILW	1908	1909	Chicago, Milwaukee and Puget Sound Railway	
Chicago, Milwaukee, St. Paul and Pacific Railroad	MILW	MILW	1928	1980	St. Maries River Railroad, Union Pacific Railroad	
Clearwater Short Line Railway		NP	1898	1914	Northern Pacific Railway	
Clearwater Valley Railroad		UP	1898	1916	Oregon–Washington Railroad and Navigation Company	
Coeur d'Alene Railway and Navigation Company		NP	1886	1897	Northern Pacific Railway	
Coeur d'Alene and Pend d'Oreille Railway		UP	1910	1941	Spokane International Railroad	
Columbia and Palouse Railroad		UP	1882	1910	Oregon Railroad and Navigation Company	
Craig Mountain Railway			1921	1965	N/A	
Craig Mountain Lumber Company's Railway			1909	1921	Craig Mountain Railway	
Gilmore and Pittsburgh Railroad		NP	1907	1939	N/A	
Great Northern Railway	GN	GN	1890	1970	Burlington Northern Inc.	
Idaho Central Railway		UP	1886	1889	Oregon Short Line and Utah Northern Railway	
Idaho Northern Railroad		UP	1906	1910	Oregon–Washington Railroad and Navigation Company	
Idaho Northern Railway		UP	1897	1912	Oregon Short Line Railroad	
Idaho Southern Railroad			1908	1916	N/A	
Idaho and Washington Northern Railroad		MILW	1907	1916	Chicago, Milwaukee and St. Paul Railway	
Idaho and Western Railway		MILW	1909	1912	Chicago, Milwaukee and Puget Sound Railway	
Intermountain Railway			1907	1935	N/A	
Kootenai Valley Railway		GN	1898	1913	Great Northern Railway	
Lake Creek and Coeur d'Alene Railroad		UP	1906	1910	Oregon–Washington Railroad and Navigation Company	
Lewiston, Nezperce and Eastern Railroad			1915	1924	N/A	
Malad Valley Railroad		UP	1902	1910	Oregon Short Line Railroad	
Milner and North Side Railroad			1907	1915	N/A	
Minidoka and Southwestern Railroad		UP	1904	1910	Oregon Short Line Railroad	
Nezperce Railroad	NEZP		1945	1983	N/A	
Nez Perce and Idaho Railroad			1917	1946	Nezperce Railroad	
Nez Perce and Idaho Railroad			1908	1915	Lewiston, Nezperce and Eastern Railroad	
Northern Pacific Railroad		NP	1864	1896	Northern Pacific Railway	
Northern Pacific Railway	NP	NP	1896	1970	Burlington Northern Inc.	
Ohio Match Company Railway		SI	1903	1944	Converted into roads.	
Oregon Railroad and Navigation Company		UP	1896	1910	Oregon–Washington Railroad and Navigation Company	
Oregon Railway and Navigation Company		UP	1884	1896	Oregon Railroad and Navigation Company	
Oregon Short Line Railroad		UP	1897	1987	Union Pacific Railroad	
Oregon Short Line Railway		UP	1882	1889	Oregon Short Line and Utah Northern Railway	
Oregon Short Line and Utah Northern Railway		UP	1889	1897	Oregon Short Line Railroad	
Oregon–Washington Railroad and Navigation Company		UP	1910	1987	Union Pacific Railroad	
Oregon, Washington and Idaho Railroad		UP	1903	1910	Oregon–Washington Railroad and Navigation Company	
Pacific and Idaho Northern Railway	P&IN	UP	1899	1936	Oregon Short Line Railroad	
Palouse River and Coulee City Railroad	PCC		1996	2006	Washington and Idaho Railway	
Payette Valley Railroad		UP	1906	1914	Oregon Short Line Railroad	
Payette Valley Extension Railroad		UP	1910	1914	Oregon Short Line Railroad	
St. Anthony Railroad		UP	1899	1910	Oregon Short Line Railroad	
Salmon River Railroad		UP	1901	1910	Oregon Short Line Railroad	
Salt Lake and Idaho Railroad		UP	1909	1914	Oregon Short Line Railroad	
San Francisco, Idaho and Montana Railway		UP	1905	1909	Oregon Short Line Railroad	
Spokane, Coeur d'Alene and Palouse Railway		GN	1926	1943	Great Northern Railway	Electric until 1941
Spokane Falls and Idaho Railroad		NP	1886	1898	Northern Pacific Railway	
Spokane International Railroad	SI	UP	1941	1987	Union Pacific Railroad	
Spokane International Railway		UP	1905	1941	Spokane International Railroad	
Spokane and Palouse Railway		NP	1886	1898	Northern Pacific Railway	
Utah Northern Railroad		UP	1872	1878	Utah and Northern Railway	
Utah and Northern Railway		UP	1878	1889	Oregon Short Line and Utah Northern Railway	
Wallace and Sunset Railroad		NP	1890	1898	Northern Pacific Railway	
Washington and Idaho Railroad		UP	1886	1896	Oregon Railroad and Navigation Company	
Washington, Idaho and Montana Railway	WIM	MILW	1905	1980	Burlington Northern Inc.	
Weiser, Idaho and Spokane Railway		UP		1899	Pacific and Idaho Northern Railway	
Yellowstone Park Railroad		UP	1905	1910	Oregon Short Line Railroad	

Electric

- Inland Empire Railroad
- Spokane, Coeur d'Alene and Palouse Railway
- Spokane and Eastern Railway and Power Company
- Spokane and Inland Empire Railroad
