= Ferdinand, Idaho =

- City
- Location of Ferdinand in Idaho County, Idaho.
- Coordinates: 46°09′07″N 116°23′24″W
- Country: United States
- State: Idaho
- County: Idaho

Government
  - Mayor: Ralph B. Wassmuth

Area
  - Total: 0.17 sq mi (0.45 km^{2})
  - Land: 0.17 sq mi (0.45 km^{2})
  - Water: 0 sq mi (0.00 km^{2})
- Elevation: 3,727 ft (1,136 m)

Population (2020)
  - Total: 133
  - Density: 770/sq mi (300/km^{2})
- Time zone: UTC-8 (Pacific (PST))
  - Summer (DST): UTC-7 (PDT)
- ZIP code: 83526
- Area code: 208
- FIPS code: 16-27460
- GNIS feature ID: 2410495

Ferdinand is a city in Idaho County, Idaho, United States. The population was 133 at the 2020 census, down from 159 in 2010. At the southern end of the Nez Perce Indian Reservation, it was founded by F.M. Bieker shortly after the reservation was opened for settlement in 1895. It was named after Ferdinand, Indiana, where his mother's family had lived.

Historical population
Census	Pop.	Note	%±
1920	255		—
1930	196		−23.1%
1940	223		13.8%
1950	206		−7.6%
1960	176		−14.6%
1970	157		−10.8%
1980	144		−8.3%
1990	135		−6.2%
2000	145		7.4%
2010	159		9.7%
2020	133		−16.4%
U.S. Decennial Census

== Geography ==
Ferdinand is located on the Camas Prairie.

According to the United States Census Bureau, the city has a total area of 0.15 square miles (0.39 km^{2}), all of it land.

== Transportation ==
=== Highway ===
- - US 95 - to Craigmont (north) and Cottonwood (south)

Northbound U.S. Route 95 was formerly routed westward through town as Main Street, first passing underneath the railroad tracks. Exiting town, old US-95 then resumed northward, following a descending tributary into Lawyers Creek Canyon. Two miles (3 km) north of Ferdinand, the old highway passed underneath a 493-foot (150 m) timber railroad trestle, Bridge #40, 122 feet (37 m) high, (photos) of the Camas Prairie Railroad, then descended into the canyon to cross the creek into Lewis County. Before climbing a tributary up to Craigmont, the highway briefly paralleled a 1,488-foot (454 m) steel railroad trestle (Bridge #38) near its base, its track 287 feet (87 m) above the creek.

After years of planning, the highway was re-routed in 1993; the straighter US-95 now bypasses Ferdinand on its east side and stays east of the railroad and above the canyon. It crosses Lawyers Creek on a 919-foot (280 m) bridge (photo) which opened in October 1991 and passes over the site of the previous 82-foot (25 m) bridge, built in 1948.

=== Railroad ===
The second subdivision of the Camas Prairie Railroad arrived in Ferdinand in 1909, branching off the main line at Spalding and ending at Grangeville. The line on the Camas Prairie has gone under several ownership changes since 1998; it is now operated by BG&CM Railroad and terminates in Cottonwood. Passenger service on the line ended 71 years ago in 1955.

== Demographics ==
=== 2010 census ===
As of the census of 2010, there were 159 people, 63 households, and 47 families residing in the city. The population density was 1,060.0 inhabitants per square mile (409.3/km^{2}). There were 67 housing units at an average density of 446.7 per square mile (172.5/km^{2}). The racial makeup of the city was 93.7% White, 0.6% Native American, 0.6% Asian, 1.3% from other races, and 3.8% from two or more races. Hispanic or Latino of any race were 3.8% of the population.

There were 63 households, of which 38.1% had children under the age of 18 living with them, 57.1% were married couples living together, 6.3% had a female householder with no husband present, 11.1% had a male householder with no wife present, and 25.4% were non-families. 22.2% of all households were made up of individuals, and 9.6% had someone living alone who was 65 years of age or older. The average household size was 2.52 and the average family size was 2.87.

The median age in the city was 38.5 years. 27% of residents were under the age of 18; 5.8% were between the ages of 18 and 24; 27% were from 25 to 44; 27.7% were from 45 to 64; and 12.6% were 65 years of age or older. The gender makeup of the city was 55.3% male and 44.7% female.

=== 2000 census ===
As of the census of 2000, there were 145 people, 60 households, and 40 families residing in the city. The population density was 1,027.1 inhabitants per square mile (396.6/km^{2}). There were 67 housing units at an average density of 474.6 per square mile (183.2/km^{2}). The racial makeup of the city was 98.62% White, 0.69% Native American, and 0.69% from two or more races.

There were 60 households, out of which 36.7% had children under the age of 18 living with them, 55.0% were married couples living together, 6.7% had a female householder with no husband present, and 31.7% were non-families. 31.7% of all households were made up of individuals, and 18.3% had someone living alone who was 65 years of age or older. The average household size was 2.42 and the average family size was 3.00.

In the city, the population was spread out, with 30.3% under the age of 18, 6.9% from 18 to 24, 25.5% from 25 to 44, 21.4% from 45 to 64, and 15.9% who were 65 years of age or older. The median age was 35 years. For every 100 females, there were 93.3 males. For every 100 females age 18 and over, there were 102.0 males.

The median income for a household in the city was $26,250, and the median income for a family was $35,625. Males had a median income of $25,750 versus $22,917 for females. The per capita income for the city was $13,513. There were 2.9% of families and 9.9% of the population living below the poverty line, including 20.0% of under eighteens and 11.8% of those over 64.
