= Great Northwest Railroad =

Overview
- Locale: North Central Idaho, United States
- Dates of operation: 2004–present
- Predecessor: Camas Prairie RailNet (1998–2004); Camas Prairie Railroad (1909–1998)

Technical
- Track gauge: 4 ft 8 1/2 in (1,435 mm) standard gauge

The Great Northwest Railroad (GRNW) is located in North Central Idaho, and runs a mainline of approximately 77 miles (124 km). Known as the Camas Prairie Railroad until 1998 and then Camas Prairie Railnet, Watco purchased the line in 2004 and renamed it the GRNW.

The railroad runs from Lewiston, Idaho, west to Riparia, Washington, and interchanges with the BNSF and Union Pacific at Ayer, Washington. Construction was completed later to form an additional branch between Spalding and Grangeville for 66 miles (106 km) and a 40-mile (64 km) connection between Orofino and Headquarters. The GRNW interchanges east of Lewiston with the BG&CM Railroad. Primary commodities of the GRNW are forest products consisting of lumber, bark, paper and tissue; agricultural products, industrial and farm chemicals, scrap iron and frozen vegetables.

== Camas Prairie Railroad ==
The Camas Prairie Railroad Company was formed in 1909, jointly owned and operated by the Northern Pacific Railway (later BNSF), and the Oregon Railroad & Navigation Company (later Union Pacific).

According to Watco, "The OWR&N came in to Lewiston via the Snake River from the west and the Northern Pacific reached Lewiston from the North out of Spokane, Washington. The competition continued up the Clearwater River from Lewiston towards Kamiah and Kooskia. This competition was known as the "Clearwater River Railroad Wars" or just "The War". In 1909, the two major carriers joined forces and the Camas Prairie Railroad was born. Rather than constructing two lines along the Clearwater River, one line was constructed and a joint operating company, Camas Prairie Railroad, was formed."
