= Winchester, Idaho =

- City
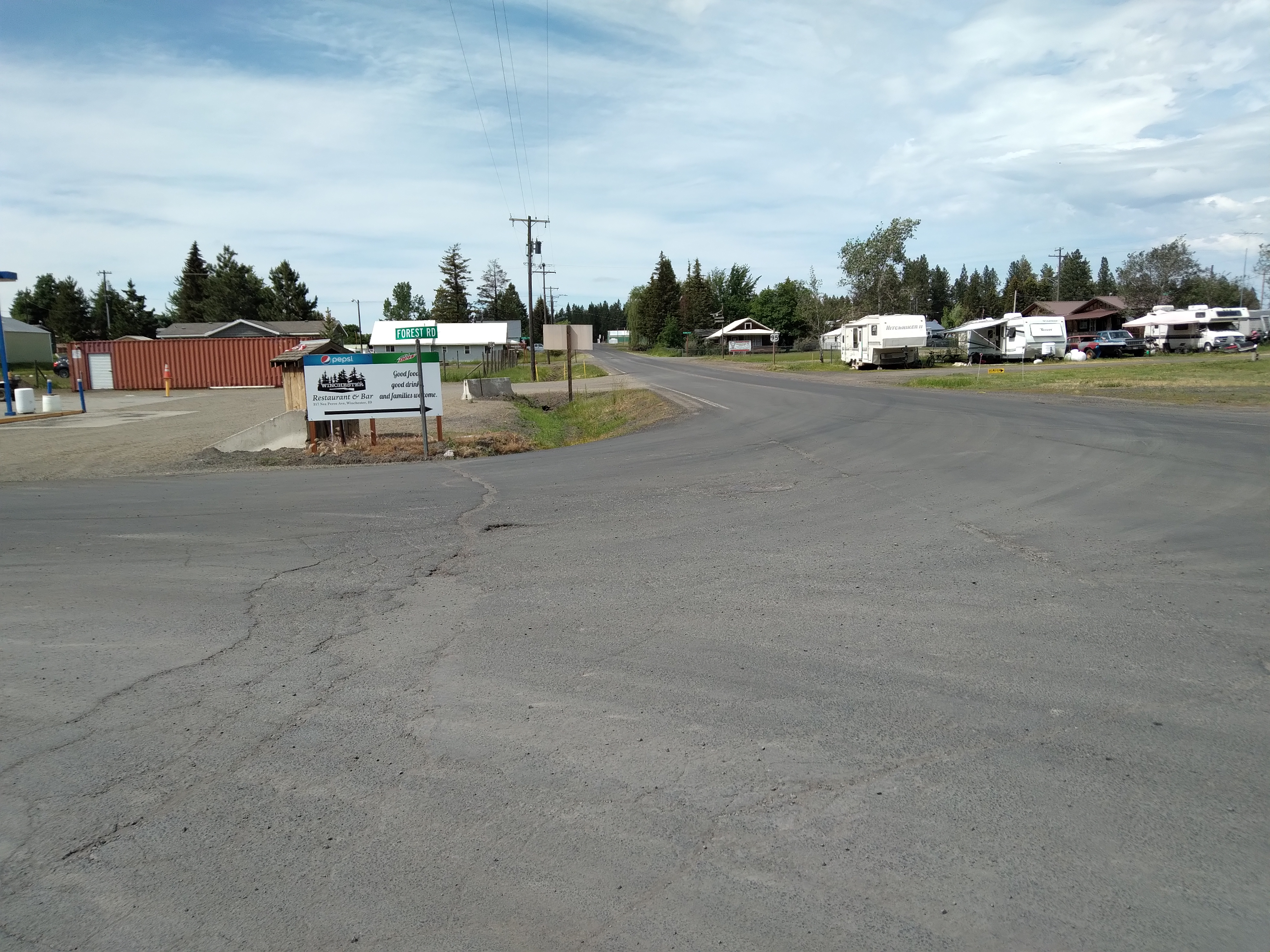
- Business Highway 95 into downtown Winchester

- Location of Winchester in Lewis County, Idaho.
- Coordinates: 46°14′27″N 116°37′32″W
- Country: United States
- State: Idaho
- County: Lewis

Area
  - Total: 0.18 sq mi (0.46 km^{2})
  - Land: 0.18 sq mi (0.46 km^{2})
  - Water: 0 sq mi (0.00 km^{2})
- Elevation: 3,977 ft (1,212 m)

Population (2020)
  - Total: 356
  - Density: 2,512.8/sq mi (970.19/km^{2})
- Time zone: UTC-8 (Pacific (PST))
  - Summer (DST): UTC-7 (PDT)
- ZIP code: 83555
- Area code: 208
- FIPS code: 16-87850
- GNIS feature ID: 2412279

Winchester is a city in western Lewis County, Idaho, United States, located on the Camas Prairie in the north central part of the state. The population was 356 at the 2020 census, up from 340 in 2010. Winchester Lake State Park lies south of the city.

== History ==
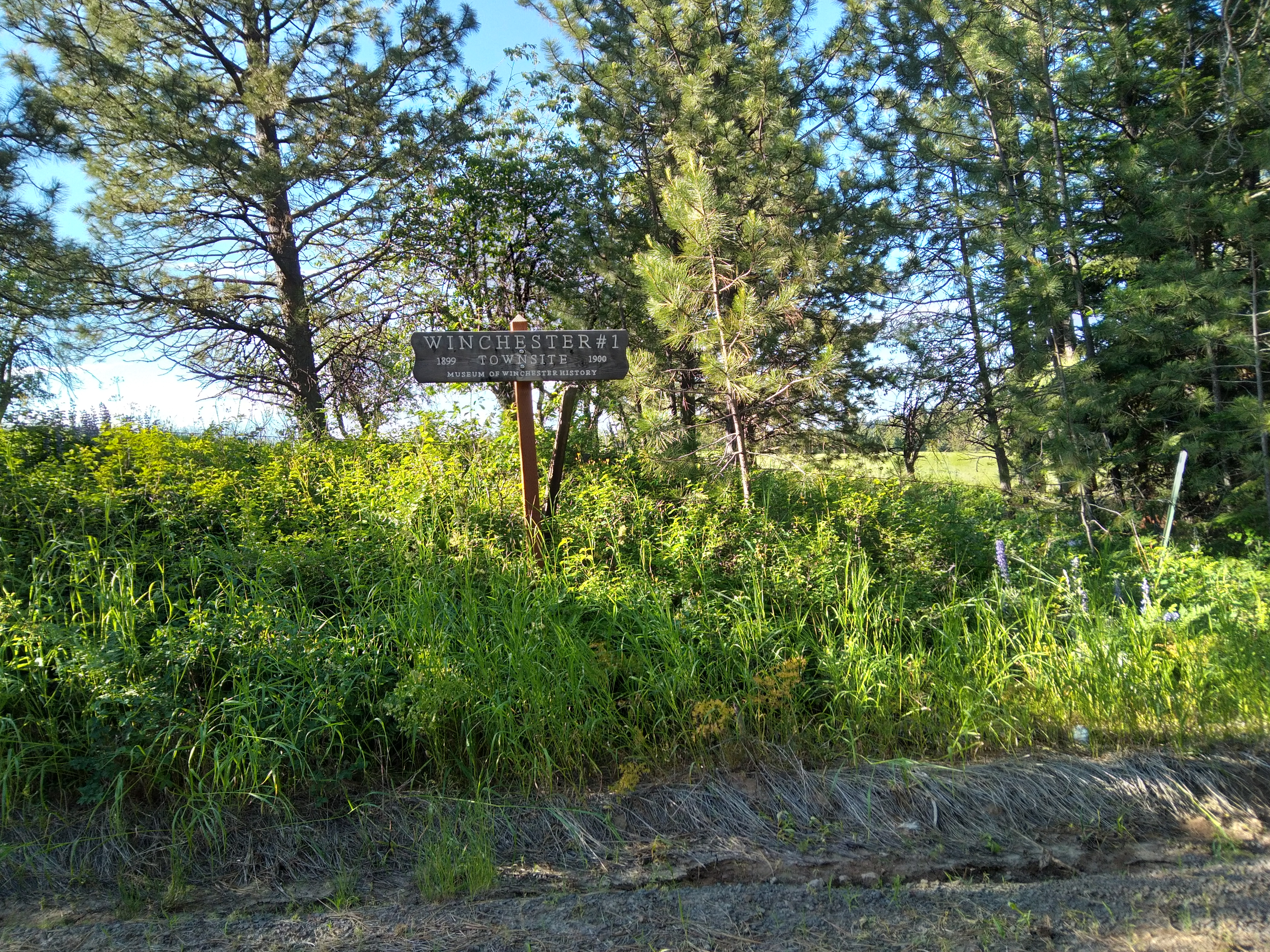
First location of Winchester and post office on Nez Perce land

Winchester is within the Nez Perce Indian Reservation, and similar to the opening of lands in Oklahoma, the U.S. government opened the reservation for white settlement in November 1895. The proclamation had been signed less than two weeks earlier by President Cleveland.

The city was named in 1900 during a meeting to establish a school district. While considering the possibilities, an individual looked at the stack of Winchester rifles at the door and suggested the name, which was approved. The sawmill closed in May 1965 after the mature timber in the area had been cut. The mill was operated by Boise Cascade for its final five years; its closure followed a fire which destroyed much of downtown Winchester in November 1964.

A half-mile (0.8 km) south of town is Winchester Lake State Park, planned in 1966, and established in 1969. Originally it was a mill pond, created in 1910 by damming Lapwai Creek. Water quality issues at the lake were addressed with the installation of aeration units in 2002.

== Geography ==
According to the United States Census Bureau, the city has a total area of 0.18 square miles (0.47 km^{2}), all of it land.

Winchester is located on the northern shore of Lapwai Lake at the location where Lapwai Creek emerges from the lake. U.S. Route 95 passes about a mile to the northeast of Winchester, but the town is connected to the highway by a business route of U.S. 95. It is located in the broader Camas Prairie region.

== Climate ==
Winchester has a Humid Subtropical climate.

Climate data for Winchester, Idaho (3972 feet)
Month	Jan	Feb	Mar	Apr	May	Jun	Jul	Aug	Sep	Oct	Nov	Dec	Year
Mean daily maximum °F (°C)	36.6 (2.6)	39.7 (4.3)	45.3 (7.4)	52.3 (11.3)	59.6 (15.3)	66.7 (19.3)	76.7 (24.8)	78.0 (25.6)	68.9 (20.5)	56.2 (13.4)	42.1 (5.6)	34.7 (1.5)	54.7 (12.6)
Daily mean °F (°C)	29.5 (−1.4)	31.4 (−0.3)	36.3 (2.4)	42.0 (5.6)	48.6 (9.2)	54.8 (12.7)	62.1 (16.7)	62.6 (17.0)	54.8 (12.7)	44.9 (7.2)	34.8 (1.6)	27.7 (−2.4)	44.1 (6.7)
Mean daily minimum °F (°C)	22.3 (−5.4)	23.0 (−5.0)	27.4 (−2.6)	31.8 (−0.1)	37.5 (3.1)	43.0 (6.1)	47.5 (8.6)	47.2 (8.4)	40.7 (4.8)	33.7 (0.9)	27.5 (−2.5)	20.6 (−6.3)	33.5 (0.8)
Average precipitation inches (mm)	1.73 (44)	1.44 (37)	2.36 (60)	2.44 (62)	3.00 (76)	2.23 (57)	1.20 (30)	1.04 (26)	1.28 (33)	1.76 (45)	2.46 (62)	1.58 (40)	22.52 (572)
Average snowfall inches (cm)	17.0 (43)	11.0 (28)	13.9 (35)	8.1 (21)	1.8 (4.6)	0.2 (0.51)	0 (0)	0 (0)	0.1 (0.25)	1.4 (3.6)	13.8 (35)	14.8 (38)	82.1 (208.96)
Source: NOAA (normals 1981−2010)

== Demographics ==
Historical population
Census	Pop.	Note	%±
1920	745		—
1930	665		−10.7%
1940	634		−4.7%
1950	488		−23.0%
1960	427		−12.5%
1970	274		−35.8%
1980	343		25.2%
1990	262		−23.6%
2000	308		17.6%
2010	340		10.4%
2020	356		4.7%
2019 (est.)	443		30.3%
U.S. Decennial Census

=== 2010 census ===
As of the census of 2010, there were 340 people, 134 households, and 84 families residing in the city. The population density was 1,888.9 inhabitants per square mile (729.3/km^{2}). There were 167 housing units at an average density of 927.8 units per square mile (358.2 units/km^{2}). The racial makeup of the city was 92.1% White, 1.2% African American, 3.2% Native American, 0.3% Asian, 0.9% from other races, and 2.4% from two or more races. Hispanic or Latino of any race were 2.1% of the population.

There were 134 households, of which 20.1% had children under the age of 18 living with them, 52.2% were married couples living together, 6.0% had a female householder with no husband present, 4.5% had a male householder with no wife present, and 37.3% were non-families. 34.3% of all households were made up of individuals, and 14.2% had someone living alone who was 65 years of age or older. The average household size was 2.19 and the average family size was 2.75.

The median age in the city was 50.4 years. 17.4% of residents were under the age of 18; 4.3% were between the ages of 18 and 24; 17.6% were from 25 to 44; 39.4% were from 45 to 64; and 21.2% were 65 years of age or older. The gender makeup of the city was 52.1% male and 47.9% female.

=== 2000 census ===
As of the census of 2000, there were 308 people, 135 households, and 88 families residing in the city. The population density was 1,699.7 inhabitants per square mile (656.3/km^{2}). There were 158 housing units at an average density of 871.9 units per square mile (336.6 units/km^{2}). The racial makeup of the city was 94.81% White, 1.30% Native American, 1.30% from other races, and 2.60% from two or more races. Hispanic or Latino of any race were 0.32% of the population.

There were 135 households, out of which 20.0% had children under the age of 18 living with them, 56.3% were married couples living together, 5.9% had a female householder with no husband present, and 34.8% were non-families. 28.9% of all households were made up of individuals, and 14.1% had someone living alone who was 65 years of age or older. The average household size was 2.22 and the average family size was 2.74.

In the city, the population was spread out, with 17.5% under the age of 18, 4.9% from 18 to 24, 23.4% from 25 to 44, 37.0% from 45 to 64, and 17.2% who were 65 years of age or older. The median age was 47 years. For every 100 females, there were 105.3 males. For every 100 females age 18 and over, there were 106.5 males.

The median income for a household in the city was $36,250, and the median income for a family was $40,179. Males had a median income of $35,625 versus $23,125 for females. The per capita income for the city was $16,588. About 8.1% of families and 7.4% of the population were below the poverty line, including 4.8% of those under the age of eighteen and 3.8% of those 65 or over.

== Transportation ==
=== Highway ===
- - US 95 - to Lewiston (north) and Grangeville (south)

The city is about two miles (3 km) west of U.S. Route 95, which connects it to Craigmont to the east and Lewiston to the northwest, via the Lapwai Canyon.

Until 1960, US 95 was routed through Winchester on this spur and descended Culdesac Hill (46.332°N 116.633°W), considered the worst of the three major grades (White Bird, Lewiston), all of which were extremely twisty. The new route through Lapwai Canyon was built in three years and reduced the distance by over four miles (6.5 km) and saved 25 minutes of driving time. The earlier road, now "Old Winchester Grade Road", was completed in 1923; its base meets the present highway near the west end of Culdesac at an approximate elevation of 1,650 feet (500 m) above sea level. The first organized road race on the old road took place in 1964; among the participants in the hill climb was Bob Knievel of Butte, Montana, later known as Evel Knievel.

The timber trestles of the former Camas Prairie Railroad are visible throughout the area.

== Education ==
The public schools are in Craigmont, operated by the Highland Joint School District #305, led by Highland High School. The consolidated district was formed in 1962; prior to that Winchester had its own schools and the high school's mascot was a logger.

== In popular culture ==
In the television series Death Valley Days, the episode “The Thirty-Caliber Town” dramatized how Winchester rifles gave the town its name. An epilogue featuring host Robert Taylor and Lester Shadduck, the mayor of Winchester, was shot on location in 1967.

== See also ==
- List of cities in Idaho
