= BG&CM Railroad =

Shortline railway in Idaho

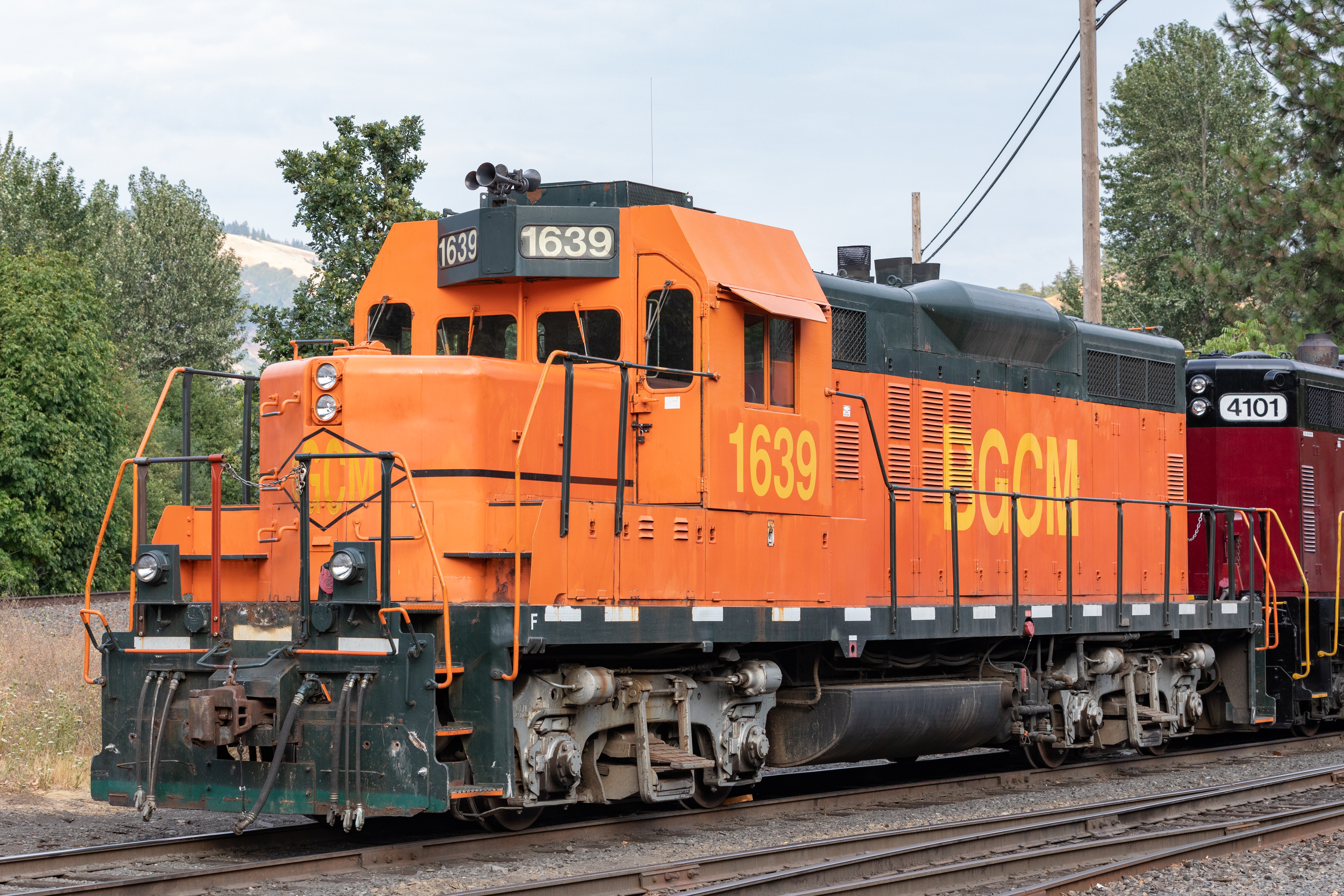
- BG&CM #1639, an EMD GP7u, is seen in Hood River, Oregon in August 2023

Overview
- Locale: North Central Idaho, U.S.
- Dates of operation: 2004–
- Predecessor: Camas Prairie RailNet (1998–2000); Camas Prairie Railroad (1909–1998)

Technical
- Track gauge: 4 ft 8 1/2 in (1,435 mm) standard gauge

The BG&CM Railroad or Bountiful Grain and Craig Mountain Railroad (reporting mark BGCM) is a Class III shortline railroad located in North Central Idaho.

== Summary ==
The BG&CM operated a line between Spalding and Cottonwood along the former Second Subdivision of the Camas Prairie Railroad. Spalding is located about 10 miles (16 km) east of Lewiston, which is at Idaho's western border with Washington. BGCM connects with Great Northwest Railroad at Spalding. BGCM also operates the portion of the former Camas Prairie Railroad which runs from Spalding to Orofino, then to Kooskia along the river grade of the Clearwater River.

BGCM's route consists of the former Camas Prairie Railroad's Second Subdivision line, which was 66.5 miles (107 km) in length from Spalding to Grangeville. As of 2005, only the 52 miles (84 km) between Spalding and Cottonwood were operated; the last 14.5 miles (23.3 km) of track between Cottonwood and Grangeville were removed in late 2002 and 2003. When BG&CM stepped in to operate the second subdivision line in December 2002, it was originally planning to operate the 34 miles (55 km) from Spalding to Craigmont, but a few weeks later decided to continue 17 miles (27 km) south, across Lawyer's Canyon to Cottonwood, stopping the salvage crews from going further north.

In 2005, Watco, owner of the BGCM's Spalding connection Great Northwest Railroad (GRNW), leased to BGCM the entire 75-mile (120 km) GRNW route east of Lewiston of mainline track, including the railroad from Orofino to Konkolville.

The BGCM route had been acquired from Camas Prairie RailNet (CSPR) in December 2002, a subsidiary of North American RailNet, which had acquired the entire Camas Prairie line in April 1998 from the line's previous (and original) co-owners, Union Pacific and BNSF. CSPR received permission from the Surface Transportation Board to abandon the Grangeville Branch in September 2000 and made its last run on that line in late November. Watco had acquired the remainder of the Camas Prairie RailNet in March 2004.

As of April, 2013, the second sub is used for storage of empty flatcars between Lapwai and Culdesac. The grade crossing of US 95 south of Craigmont has been removed and the crossings in that town are graveled over. Also, one of the wooden trestles—Bridge 21.3—near Winchester was lost in a forest fire on September 7, 2011. All that remains of the trestle is a single rail suspended precariously across the chasm, as well as ashes and bits of metal beneath. A fire also destroyed the original elevators at Craigmont, beginning on May 12, 2013. The fire smoldered for nearly three weeks.

In September 2026, a bridge over US 95, on the grade formerly used to climb from Culdesac to Craigmont was removed by the Idaho Transportation Department.

== History ==
The Camas Prairie Railroad was formed in 1909, and was jointly owned and operated by the former Northern Pacific Railway (later Burlington Northern Santa Fe), and the former Oregon-Washington Railroad and Navigation Company (later Union Pacific). The two railroads were competitors throughout the Pacific Northwest, battling to capture railroad traffic in timber, minerals, and agricultural products. Camas Prairie Railroad was sold by co-owners UP and BNSF to North American RailNet of Bedford, Texas in April 1998 and it became Camas Prairie RailNet, Inc. After six years it was sold to Watco and became Great Northwest Railroad in March 2004. There were about 177 miles (285 km) of track in the transaction: 72 miles (116 km) from Riparia, Washington, east to Lewiston; 74 miles (119 km) from Lewiston east to Kooskia; and 31 miles (50 km) from Orofino northeast to near Jaype. The Orofino to Jaype segment was out of service.

BGCM is owned by Midwest Pacific Rail Net & Logistics of Kansas City.

MPRL also owns:

- Boot Hill and Western Railway (Out of Service)
- Dakota Southern Railway
- Fremont Northern Railway
- Iowa River Railroad
- Nevada Northern Railway
- McCloud River Railroad (Out of Service)
- Ozark Valley Railroad
- St. Maries River Railroad
- Washington and Idaho Railway

In 2009, BGCM's owner attempted to purchase a portion of the Arizona and California Railroad, running 49.4 miles (79.5 km) between Rice, California and Ripley, California through Blythe, California from RailAmerica then-recently granted for abandonment, but failed to succeed an offer of financial assistance process.

== Connection ==
Great Northwest Railroad (GRNW) at Spalding, Idaho. GRNW is a WATCO company, which owns 35 shortline railroads nationwide.

== Motive Power ==
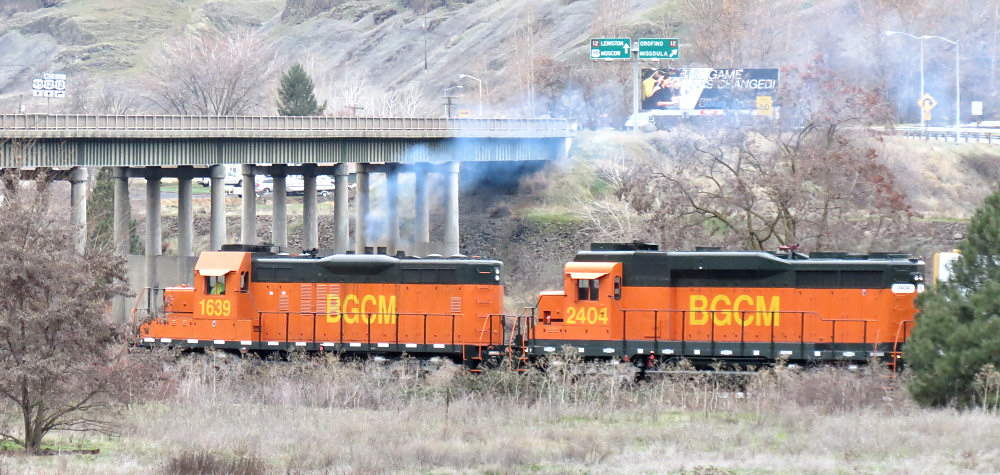
Bountiful Grain and Craig Mountain Railroad GP9u #1639 powers up to take GP30 #2404 and a load of wood products under the US 95 bridge and down the Clearwater River, Dec. 2, 2013

BGCM operates an ex-ATSF GP30, numbered as BGCM 2404 (EMD 27191, 7622-5, April 1962; ex-BNSF 2404; ex-ATSF 2704:2; ex-ATSF 3204; née-ATSF 1204), as well as an EMD GP9u, numbered as BGCM 1639.
