= Fenn, Idaho =

Unincorporated community in Idaho, United States

- Unincorporated community
- Location within Idaho Location within the United States
- Coordinates: 45.965°N 116.260°W
- Country: United States
- State: Idaho
- County: Idaho
- Elevation: 3,274 ft (998 m)
- Time zone: UTC-8 (Pacific (PST))
  - Summer (DST): UTC-7 (PDT)
- ZIP code: 83531
- Area codes: 208, 986
- GNIS feature ID: 396482

Fenn is an unincorporated community in Idaho County, Idaho, United States. It is located on U.S. Route 95 on the Camas Prairie, seven miles (11 km) northwest of Grangeville and eight miles (13 km) south of Cottonwood. Fenn had a post office with ZIP code 83531.

Originally Tharp, it was named in 1915 (or earlier) after the Fenn family. Stephen S. Fenn (1820–92) arrived in Florence from California in 1862 with his wife and four children. He was an early settler, attorney, administrator, speaker of territorial legislature, and a territorial delegate to Congress. His son, Major Frank A. Fenn (1853–1927), also of many professions, was the speaker of the first state legislature. Frank's son Lloyd (1884–1953) also served in the legislature.

An earlier settlement a few miles north, Denver, was mostly abandoned after the Camas Prairie Railroad bypassed it. A grain elevator was constructed in Fenn in 1918, and an upgrade was added in 1946, served by the railroad until the abandonment of its Second Subdivision line to Grangeville in late 2000.

Fenn's population was 25 in 1960.

== Climate ==
According to the Köppen Climate Classification system, Fenn has an oceanic climate, abbreviated "Cfb" on climate maps. The hottest temperature recorded in Fenn was 110 °F (43.3 °C) on June 19, 2021, while the coldest temperature recorded was −16 °F (−26.7 °C) on January 10, 1949.

Climate data for Fenn, Idaho, 1991–2020 normals, extremes 1939–present
| Month | Jan | Feb | Mar | Apr | May | Jun | Jul | Aug | Sep | Oct | Nov | Dec | Year |
|---|---|---|---|---|---|---|---|---|---|---|---|---|---|
| Record high °F (°C) | 63 (17) | 67 (19) | 79 (26) | 94 (34) | 100 (38) | 110 (43) | 109 (43) | 107 (42) | 103 (39) | 87 (31) | 68 (20) | 60 (16) | 110 (43) |
| Mean maximum °F (°C) | 44.8 (7.1) | 53.2 (11.8) | 66.7 (19.3) | 80.1 (26.7) | 89.2 (31.8) | 94.9 (34.9) | 100.3 (37.9) | 99.9 (37.7) | 89.9 (32.2) | 74.9 (23.8) | 56.4 (13.6) | 43.7 (6.5) | 101.6 (38.7) |
| Mean daily maximum °F (°C) | 36.5 (2.5) | 42.6 (5.9) | 52.2 (11.2) | 61.5 (16.4) | 72.0 (22.2) | 78.4 (25.8) | 90.3 (32.4) | 89.7 (32.1) | 77.5 (25.3) | 60.5 (15.8) | 44.5 (6.9) | 35.6 (2.0) | 61.8 (16.5) |
| Daily mean °F (°C) | 31.4 (−0.3) | 35.1 (1.7) | 41.7 (5.4) | 48.7 (9.3) | 57.2 (14.0) | 63.3 (17.4) | 71.7 (22.1) | 70.6 (21.4) | 61.3 (16.3) | 49.1 (9.5) | 37.9 (3.3) | 31.2 (−0.4) | 49.9 (10.0) |
| Mean daily minimum °F (°C) | 26.3 (−3.2) | 27.6 (−2.4) | 31.2 (−0.4) | 36.0 (2.2) | 42.4 (5.8) | 48.2 (9.0) | 53.1 (11.7) | 51.5 (10.8) | 45.2 (7.3) | 37.8 (3.2) | 31.2 (−0.4) | 26.7 (−2.9) | 38.1 (3.4) |
| Mean minimum °F (°C) | 13.0 (−10.6) | 17.6 (−8.0) | 23.3 (−4.8) | 28.8 (−1.8) | 32.9 (0.5) | 40.1 (4.5) | 46.2 (7.9) | 44.7 (7.1) | 37.3 (2.9) | 28.3 (−2.1) | 20.8 (−6.2) | 15.1 (−9.4) | 7.8 (−13.4) |
| Record low °F (°C) | −16 (−27) | −8 (−22) | 0 (−18) | 19 (−7) | 25 (−4) | 18 (−8) | 35 (2) | 36 (2) | 27 (−3) | 9 (−13) | −2 (−19) | −12 (−24) | −16 (−27) |
| Average precipitation inches (mm) | 4.91 (125) | 3.72 (94) | 4.32 (110) | 4.05 (103) | 3.59 (91) | 3.67 (93) | 0.88 (22) | 0.86 (22) | 1.62 (41) | 3.13 (80) | 5.15 (131) | 4.70 (119) | 40.60 (1,031) |
| Average snowfall inches (cm) | 13.3 (34) | 6.8 (17) | 2.7 (6.9) | 0.3 (0.76) | 0.0 (0.0) | 0.0 (0.0) | 0.0 (0.0) | 0.0 (0.0) | 0.0 (0.0) | 0.0 (0.0) | 3.0 (7.6) | 17.0 (43) | 43.1 (109.26) |
| Average extreme snow depth inches (cm) | 10.5 (27) | 6.8 (17) | 2.8 (7.1) | 0.2 (0.51) | 0.0 (0.0) | 0.0 (0.0) | 0.0 (0.0) | 0.0 (0.0) | 0.0 (0.0) | 0.0 (0.0) | 2.1 (5.3) | 8.9 (23) | 12.8 (33) |
| Average precipitation days (≥ 0.01 in) | 17.2 | 16.1 | 17.6 | 17.3 | 14.5 | 12.8 | 5.2 | 4.9 | 6.4 | 13.4 | 16.9 | 18.5 | 160.8 |
| Average snowy days (≥ 0.1 in) | 6.3 | 3.9 | 2.0 | 0.2 | 0.0 | 0.0 | 0.0 | 0.0 | 0.0 | 0.0 | 1.8 | 7.1 | 21.3 |
Source 1: NOAA
Source 2: National Weather Service

== Notable people ==
- James Henry Meyer, Chancellor of the University of California, Davis, from 1969 to 1987
