= Highland High School (Craigmont, Idaho) =

Coordinates: 46.244°N 116.472°W

Highland School
- 112 Boulevard Ave. Craigmont, Idaho; United States

Information
- Type: Public
- Established: 1962
- School district: Highland J.S.D. #305
- Principal: Dennis Fredrickson
- Teaching staff: 16.00 (FTE)
- Grades: PK–12
- Enrollment: 168 (2024–2025)
- Student to teacher ratio: 10.50
- Colors: Gold & Black
- Athletics: IHSAA Class 1A DII
- Athletics conference: White Pine League
- Mascot: Husky
- Rival: Nez Perce Nighthawks
- Newspaper: The Husky Howl
- Information: (208) 924-5211
- Elevation: 3,740 ft (1,140 m) AMSL
- Website: Highland J.S.D. #305

Highland School is a public school in Craigmont, Idaho, the only school in the Highland Joint School District #305. Located on the Camas Prairie in rural Lewis County in the north central part of the state, it is often referred to as "Highland-Craigmont" to distinguish it from the larger and later established Highland High School in Pocatello. The school colors are black and gold, and the mascot is Harold the husky.

In addition to Craigmont, the school district draws from Reubens, Winchester, and Melrose.

== Consolidation ==
In 1962, the Craigmont, Winchester, and Reubens school districts were consolidated into the new Highland Joint School District. The student body selected the new name of Craigmont High and the mascot. The former mascots were Craigmont Cougars, Winchester Loggers, and Reubens Demons. The current campus was constructed ten years earlier, in 1952.

== Athletics ==
The Highland Huskies compete in athletics in IHSAA Class 1A Division II (formerly A-4) in the White Pine League.

=== State titles ===
Boys

- Basketball (1): (A-4) 1984
- Track (2): (A-4) 1995, 1996

Girls

- Basketball (4): (A-4) 1978, 1985, 1993, 1995 (introduced in 1976, A-4 in 1977)
- Track (1): 1993 (introduced in 1971, A-4 in 1993)
