= Camas Prairie Railroad =

Short line railroad in northern Idaho (1909–1998)

Camas Prairie Railroad Company
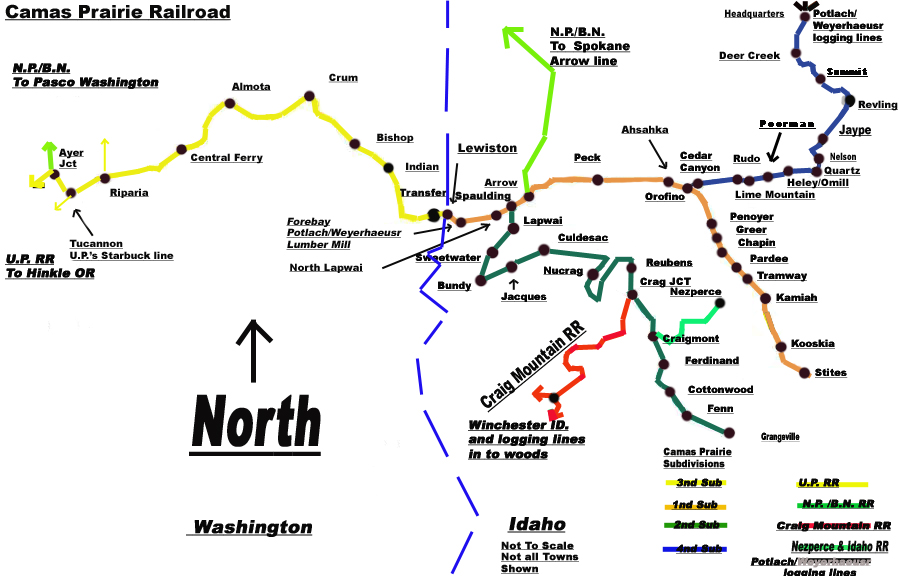

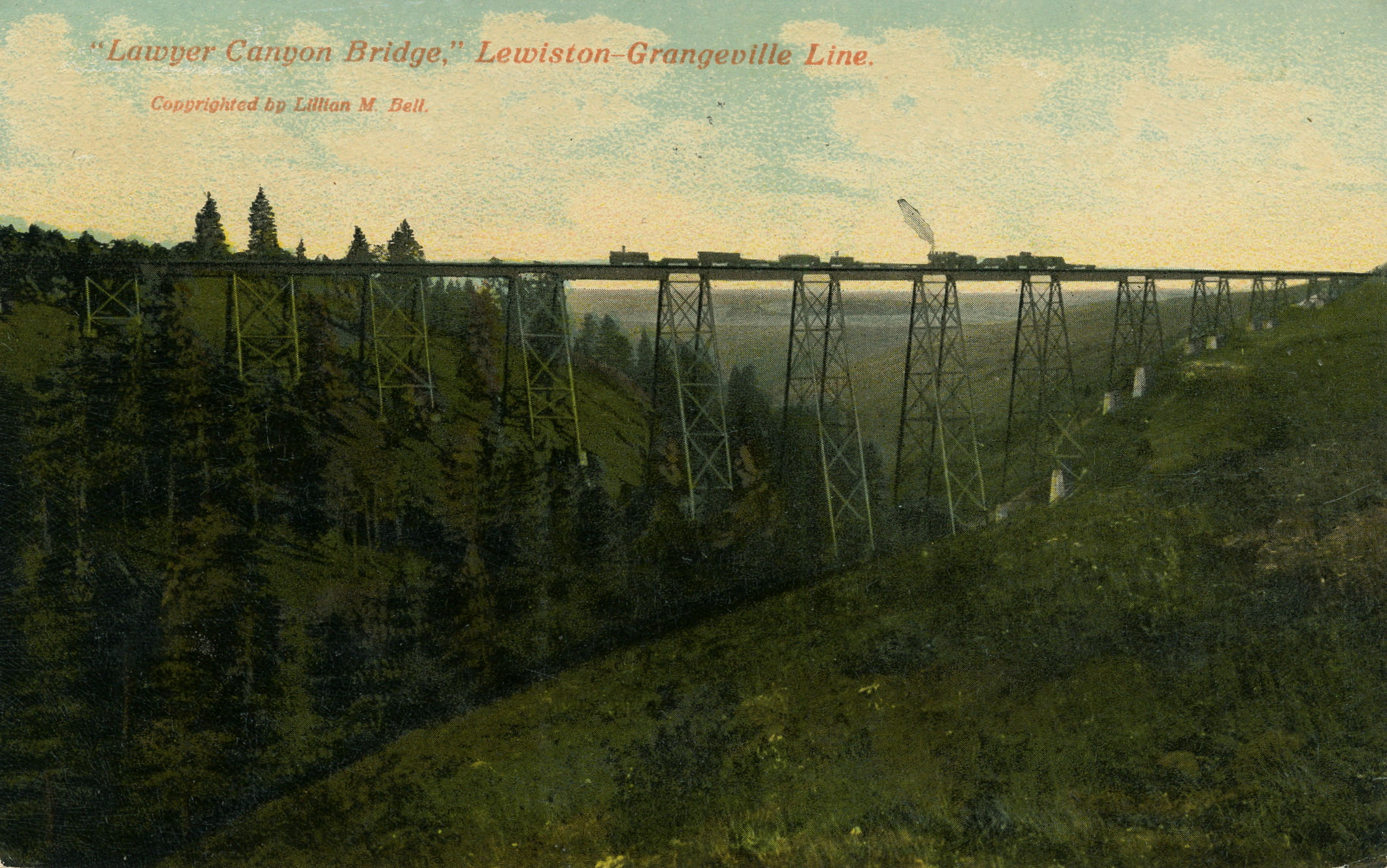
- Lawyer's Canyon steel viaduct (1909) (46.2°N 116.42°W)

Overview
- Headquarters: Lewiston, Idaho, U.S.
- Reporting mark: CSP
- Locale: Lewiston, ID to Riparia, WA; Lewiston to Stites, ID; Spalding to Grangeville, ID; Orofino to Headquarters, ID
- Dates of operation: 1909–1998
- Successor: Camas Prairie RailNet (1998–2004); Great Northwest Railroad (2004– ) BG&CM Railroad (2004– ) (2nd subdivision)

Technical
- Track gauge: 4 ft 8 1/2 in (1,435 mm) standard gauge

Location in the United States

Camas Prairie Railroad Company (reporting mark CSP) was a short line railroad in northern Idaho jointly owned and operated by Northern Pacific Railway and Union Pacific.

Parts of the former railroad are now operated by the Great Northwest Railroad and the BG&CM Railroad.

== History ==
The Nez Perce Indian Reservation was opened to White settlement in 1895. By the turn of the 20th century, Edward H. Harriman and James J. Hill were engaged in a "railroad war" for control of rail routes through this area to reach the Pacific Northwest. Despite their competing interests, the railroad barons co-operated to build the Camas Prairie Railroad.

The CSP was built to tap the rolling, fertile hills of the Camas Prairie and the timber of the forested hills and canyonlands of the Clearwater River. Service to the south terminus of the second subdivision line at Grangeville commenced in December 1908, and continued for 92 years.

== Features ==
The Camas Prairie Railroad was known as the "railroad on stilts" due to the many wooden trestles along its route. In one five-mile (8 km) stretch, there were more than a dozen trestles, and along the entire 66-mile (106 km) length of the second subdivision, the line passes over 45 bridges and seven tunnels (though one bridge has since burned down and tunnel #2 was long ago day-lighted). The sub-division's largest timber trestles and all 7 tunnels are between Culdesac and Reubens, where the line continues up Lapwai Creek Canyon then loops back north and finally climbs out through Rock Creek canyon, a 2,000-foot (610 m) ascent at a 3% grade.

Among the line's notable features are the curved timber-frame trestle Bridge 22, known as "Half-moon Trestle". This bridge, partially visible from U.S. Route 95, has a length of 685 feet (209 m) and is 141 feet (43 m) high, and was built with almost 1 million board-feet of lumber. Tunnel 1, called "horeshoe tunnel", bends at such an angle that neither end can be seen from the middle. This tunnel, and several others are either timber-framed or have timber-framed entrances. In addition to its wooden trestles, the railroad's second subdivision also had a sizable steel viaduct, 1,520 feet (463 m) in length with a maximum height of 280 feet (85 m). Known as Bridge 38 (46.2°N 116.42°W), it spans Lawyer's Canyon between Craigmont and Ferdinand, and is also visible from U.S. 95.

== Nezperce & Idaho Railroad ==
The Nezperce & Idaho Railroad (reporting mark NP&I) was an independently owned short line railroad that connected the community of Nezperce to the Camas Prairie Railroad. Primarily used to ship agricultural products it operated from 1910 until 1975, it was then used for boxcar storage until the 1980s.

== Demise ==
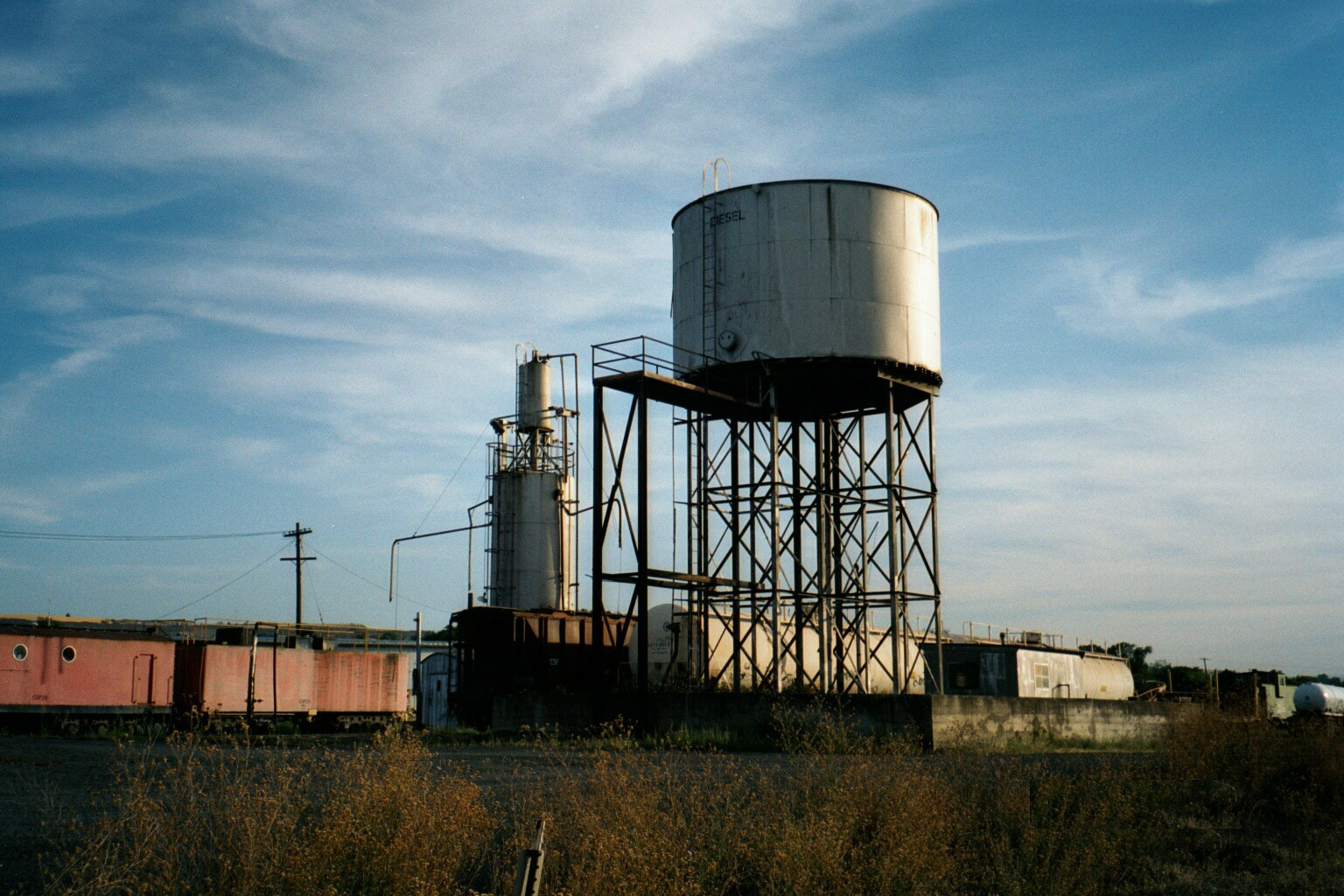
Railroad's water tower in Lewiston (2002)

The railroad was sold to North American RailNet in April 1998, and it became the subsidiary Camas Prairie RailNet, Inc. (CSPR). After less than two years, CSPR notified the U.S. government in late 1999 that the second subdivision line to Grangeville could be subject to abandonment, citing lack of profitability. It made its formal request in May, and it was approved by the Surface Transportation Board in September 2000; the last run to Fenn and Grangeville was on November 29. The tracks were to be removed shortly thereafter, but that was delayed as a new operator for the line was sought. When BG&CM stepped in to operate the second subdivision line in December 2002, it was originally only to extend from Spalding to Craigmont, but a few weeks later decided to continue south, across Lawyer's Canyon to Cottonwood, stopping the salvage crews from going further north.

The tracks from Cottonwood to Grangeville were removed and salvaged in late 2002 and 2003. North American RailNet sold the remainder of the railroad to Watco in March 2004, which renamed it the Great Northwest Railroad.

In 2011, Bridge 21-3 was destroyed in a wildfire. Although BG&CM owner Mike Williams indicated plans to rebuild by spring of 2012 at the latest, no construction has occurred.

By 2021 the tracks had been removed all the way from Grangeville to Ruebens.

== Second subdivision ==
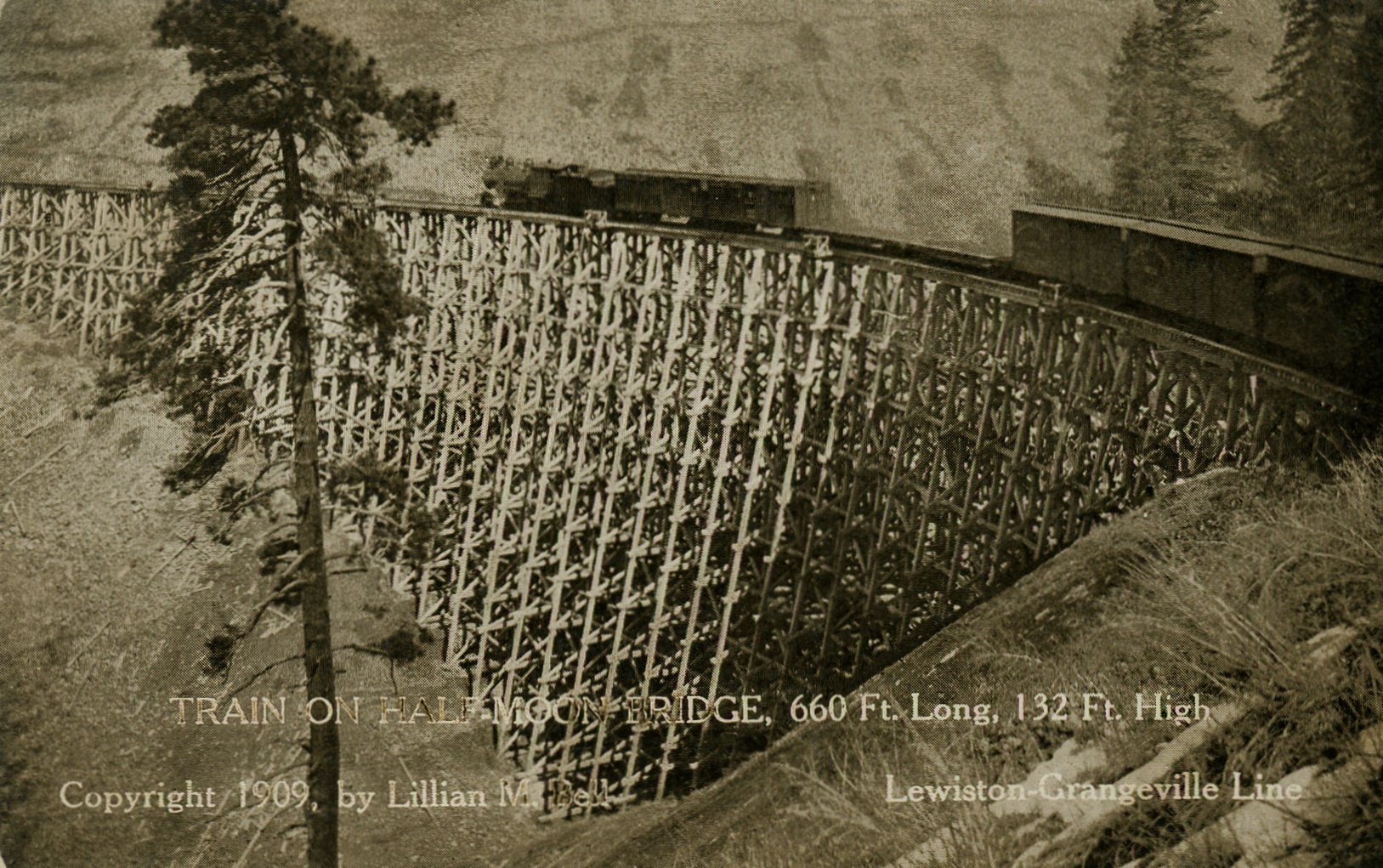
Half Moon Trestle (1909) (46.325°N 116.5743°W)

All locations in north central Idaho

County	City / Stop	Mile	Elevation	
County	City / Stop	Mile	feet	m
Nez; Perce	Spalding	0	805	245
Nez; Perce	Lapwai	3.3	955	291
Nez; Perce	Sweetwater	5.3	1,090	332
Nez; Perce	Culdesac	12.1	1,645	501
Lewis	Nucrag	19.5	2,780	847
Lewis	Reubens	26.1	3,525	1,074
Lewis	Craigmont	34.4	3,740	1,140
Idaho	Ferdinand	42.3	3,720	1,134
Idaho	Cottonwood	51.0	3,495	1,065
Idaho	Fenn	59.5	3,275	998
Idaho	Grangeville	66.8	3,395	1,035

== Passenger service ==
Passenger service on the main line along the Clearwater River to Stites and on the second subdivision to Grangeville was discontinued in August 1955.

== Popular culture ==
The 1975 film Breakheart Pass starring Charles Bronson was filmed on portions of the railroad, as were parts of 1999's Wild Wild West.
