= Idaho County Airport =

- IATA: IDH; ICAO: KGIC; FAA LID: GIC

Summary
- Airport type: Public
- Owner: Idaho County
- Location: Grangeville, Idaho
- Elevation AMSL: 3,314 ft (1,010 m)
- Coordinates: 45°56′33″N 116°07′24″W
- Website: Idaho Co. Airport

Map
- Location in the United States Location in Idaho

Runways
Direction	Length		Surface
Direction	ft	m	Surface
8/26	5,101	1,555	Asphalt

Statistics (2010)
- Aircraft operations: 13,000
- Based aircraft: 14
- Source: Federal Aviation Administration

Idaho County Airport (IATA: IDH, ICAO: KGIC, FAA LID: GIC, formerly S80) is a county-owned, public-use airport in the western United States. Located in north central Idaho, it is one nautical mile (1.15 mi, 1.85 km) north of the central business district of Grangeville, the seat of Idaho County.

Although most U.S. airports use the same three-letter location identifier for the FAA and IATA, this airport is assigned GIC by the FAA and IDH by the IATA (which assigned GIC to Boigu Island Airport in Queensland, Australia).

== Facilities and aircraft ==
Idaho County Airport covers an area of 161 acres (65 ha) at an elevation of 3,314 feet (1,010 m) above mean sea level. It has one runway designated 8/26 with an asphalt surface measuring 5,101 by 75 feet (1,555 x 23 m).

For the 12-month period ending on March 19, 2010, the airport had 13,000 aircraft operations, an average of 35 per day: 81% general aviation and 19% air taxi. At that time, there were 14 aircraft based at this airport: 13 single-engine and 1 ultralight.

Home to the Grangeville Smokejumpers of the U.S. Forest Service, the airport is one of seven USFS smokejumper bases in the western United States.

== See also ==
- List of airports in Idaho
