= Hallalhotsoot =

Nez Percé tribal leader

Hallalhotsoot (Chief Lawyer)
- Hallalhotsoot
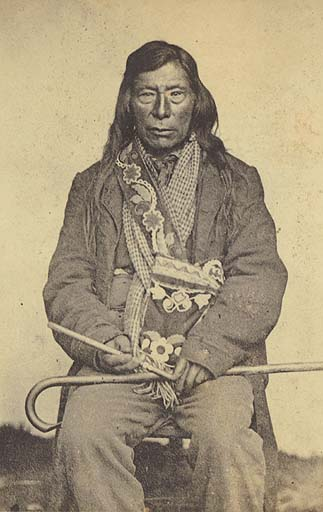
- Hallalhotsoot, c. 1861
- Born: c. 1797
- Died: January 3, 1876; Kamiah, Idaho Territory
- Resting place: Nikesa Cemetery; First Presbyterian Church; Kamiah, Idaho
- Known for: Nez Perce leader
- Successor: Chief Joseph
- Parents: Twisted Hair (father); A Flathead woman (mother)

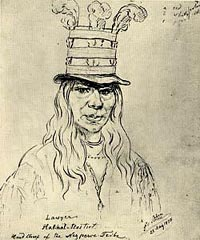
Hallalhotsoot, with his noted mix of an "American" hat with its Niimíipu ornamentation

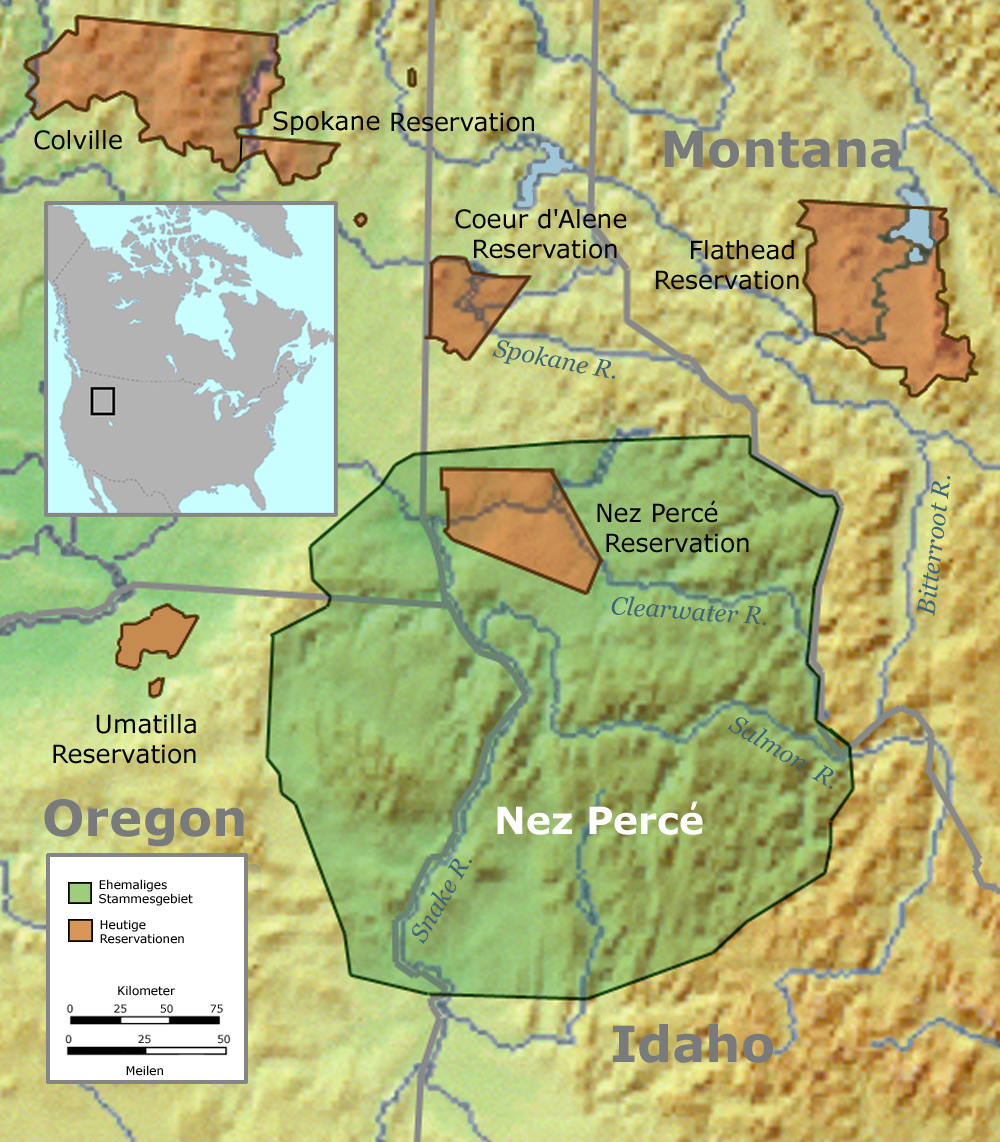
Original Nez Perce territory (green) & reduced reservation of 1863 (brown)

Hallalhotsoot, also Hal-hal-tlos-tsot or "Lawyer" (c. 1797–1876) was a leader of the Niimíipu (Nez Perce) and among its most famous, after Chief Joseph. He was the son of Twisted Hair, who welcomed and befriended the exhausted Lewis and Clark Expedition in 1805. His mother was a Flathead woman. Lawyer learned the languages of his parents and knew some English.

His name appears as early as 1836 in a meeting with Marcus Whitman, and received the nickname "Lawyer" for his eloquence. He served as a guide for Whitman.

After a group of missionaries arrived at Whitman Mission Station in Waiilatpu in 1838, Lawyer taught Asa Bowen Smith the Nez Perce language, from which Smith developed a grammar and dictionary entitled Grammar of the Language of the Nez Perces Indians. Two missionary couples—Cushing and Myra Eels and Elkanah and Mary Richardson Walker—were going to be stationed with the Spokane people. Lawyer helped them learn their language, which was similar to that of the Flatheads.

In 1855, he took part in the Walla Walla Council and signed the Treaty of Stevens. This obtained for him a reservation to the greater part of his territory, between the Clearwater and Salmon rivers.

After gold was discovered in Pierce in 1860, Lawyer agreed to new cessions of land in the Treaty of 1863, in 1868, which Old Joseph (c.1785–1871) did not accept and considered it a betrayal. Therefore, in 1872, Hallalhotsoot was displaced by Chief Joseph as the only head of the tribe.

Lawyer Creek in north central Idaho, a tributary of the Clearwater River, is named for him. It carved the 300-foot (90 m) deep Lawyer's Canyon, between Ferdinand and Craigmont, and flows east to its mouth at Kamiah. He died in Kamiah and is buried at its Nikesa Cemetery at the Presbyterian church, where he was an elder.

== Source ==
- Spalding, Henry H.; Smith, Asa Bowen; Drury, Clifford Merrill (1958). The Diaries and Letters of Henry H. Spalding and Asa Bowen Smith Relating to the Nez Perce Mission, 1838-1842. Northwest historical series,4. Arthur H. Clark Company. hdl:2027/mdp.39015001662900.
