= James Henry Meyer =

James H. Meyer (1922–2002) served as chancellor of the University of California, Davis, from 1969 to 1987.

He was born in Fenn, Idaho in 1922.

He did his undergraduate studies at the University of Idaho. His studies at University of Idaho were interrupted during his service as a 1st Lieutenant in the United States Marine Corps during World War II in the Pacific Theater. He received a B.S. degree in agriculture in 1947 from the University of Idaho in 1947 followed by M.S. and Ph.D. degrees in animal nutrition at the University of Wisconsin–Madison. In 1951, he accepted appointment as instructor in the then Animal Husbandry Department at UC Davis.

He was appointed department chair in 1960 and appointed Dean of the College of Agriculture in 1963. During his term as Dean, Meyer proposed the creation of the Academic Staff Organization (now the Academic Federation) to provide a forum and a voice for the many academic appointees who were not members of the Academic Senate. The Academic Federation's annual Distinguished Achievement Award is named in his honor.

Meyer was inaugurated as the third chancellor of UC Davis in a ceremony on the Quad on April 24, 1970. Campus milestones that occurred during his tenure as chancellor included: acquisition of the UC Davis Medical Center in Sacramento, establishment of the Graduate School of Administration (now Management), the Divisions of Biology and Environmental Sciences, the Work-Learn Center, and construction of Rec Hall without state funds. Meyer served as chancellor until 1987 when Theodore Hullar was appointed as the fourth chancellor of UC Davis.

Meyer Hall was dedicated in his honor on April 15, 1989.

Meyer died on October 12, 2002.
