= Cottonwood, Idaho =

City in the United States

- City
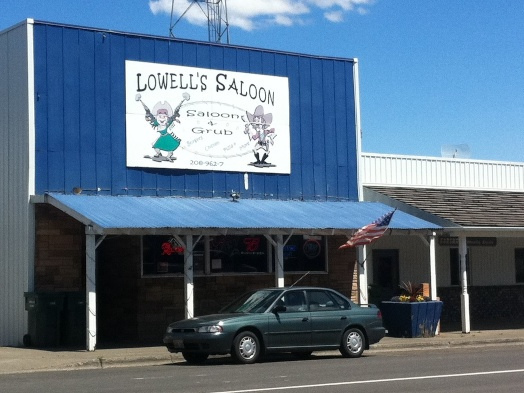

- Location of Cottonwood in Idaho County, Idaho.
- Coordinates: 46°03′04″N 116°20′59″W
- Country: United States
- State: Idaho
- County: Idaho

Area
  - Total: 0.84 sq mi (2.17 km^{2})
  - Land: 0.84 sq mi (2.17 km^{2})
  - Water: 0 sq mi (0.00 km^{2})
- Elevation: 3,521 ft (1,073 m)

Population (2020)
  - Total: 822
  - Density: 1,120.0/sq mi (432.45/km^{2})
- Time zone: UTC-8 (Pacific (PST))
  - Summer (DST): UTC-7 (PDT)
- ZIP codes: 83522
- Area code: 208
- FIPS code: 16-18640
- GNIS feature ID: 2410243

Cottonwood is a city in Idaho County, Idaho. On the Camas Prairie in north central Idaho, the population was 822 at the 2020 census, down from 900 in 2010 and 944 in 2000. It is just west of U.S. Route 95, between Grangeville and Lewiston.

== Origins ==
Cottonwood began in 1862 as a series of way station shelters for prospectors and mining suppliers on their way south to Florence and Warrens. It was named for the dense growth of trees that formerly lined Cottonwood Creek.

== Demographics ==
Historical population
Census	Pop.	Note	%±
1910	555		—
1920	610		9.9%
1930	519		−14.9%
1940	673		29.7%
1950	689		2.4%
1960	1,081		56.9%
1970	867		−19.8%
1980	941		8.5%
1990	822		−12.6%
2000	944		14.8%
2010	900		−4.7%
2020	822		−8.7%
2019 (est.)	940		4.4%
U.S. Decennial Census

=== 2010 census ===
As of the census of 2010, there were 900 people, 363 households, and 240 families residing in the city. The population density was 1,071.4 inhabitants per square mile (413.7/km^{2}). There were 392 housing units at an average density of 466.7 per square mile (180.2/km^{2}). The racial makeup of the city was 97.1% White, 0.9% African American, 0.3% Native American, 0.2% Asian, 0.1% Pacific Islander, 0.4% from other races, and 0.9% from two or more races. Hispanic or Latino of any race were 0.9% of the population.

There were 363 households, of which 31.4% had children under the age of 18 living with them, 52.9% were married couples living together, 10.5% had a female householder with no husband present, 2.8% had a male householder with no wife present, and 33.9% were non-families. 28.7% of all households were made up of individuals, and 17.1% had someone living alone who was 65 years of age or older. The average household size was 2.43 and the average family size was 3.05.

The median age in the city was 43.2 years. 26.6% of residents were under the age of 18; 7.3% were between the ages of 18 and 24; 18.6% were from 25 to 44; 29% were from 45 to 64; and 18.4% were 65 years of age or older. The gender makeup of the city was 48.1% male and 51.9% female.

=== 2000 census ===
As of the census of 2000, there were 944 people, 364 households, and 242 families residing in the city. The population density was 1,136.4 inhabitants per square mile (438.8/km^{2}). There were 398 housing units at an average density of 479.1 per square mile (185.0/km^{2}). The racial makeup of the city was 97.99% White, 0.64% Native American, 0.42% Asian, and 0.95% from two or more races. Hispanic or Latino of any race were 0.42% of the population.

There were 364 households, out of which 34.6% had children under the age of 18 living with them, 54.7% were married couples living together, 8.2% had a female householder with no husband present, and 33.5% were non-families. 28.8% of all households were made up of individuals, and 15.4% had someone living alone who was 65 years of age or older. The average household size was 2.51 and the average family size was 3.14.

In the city, the population was spread out, with 29.7% under the age of 18, 6.3% from 18 to 24, 24.6% from 25 to 44, 21.5% from 45 to 64, and 18.0% who were 65 years of age or older. The median age was 39 years. For every 100 females, there were 94.2 males. For every 100 females age 18 and over, there were 94.2 males.

The median income for a household in the city was $34,167, and the median income for a family was $39,625. Males had a median income of $30,833 versus $20,833 for females. The per capita income for the city was $15,003. About 5.8% of families and 10.7% of the population were below the poverty line, including 6.7% of those under age 18 and 6.2% of those age 65 or over.

== Geography ==
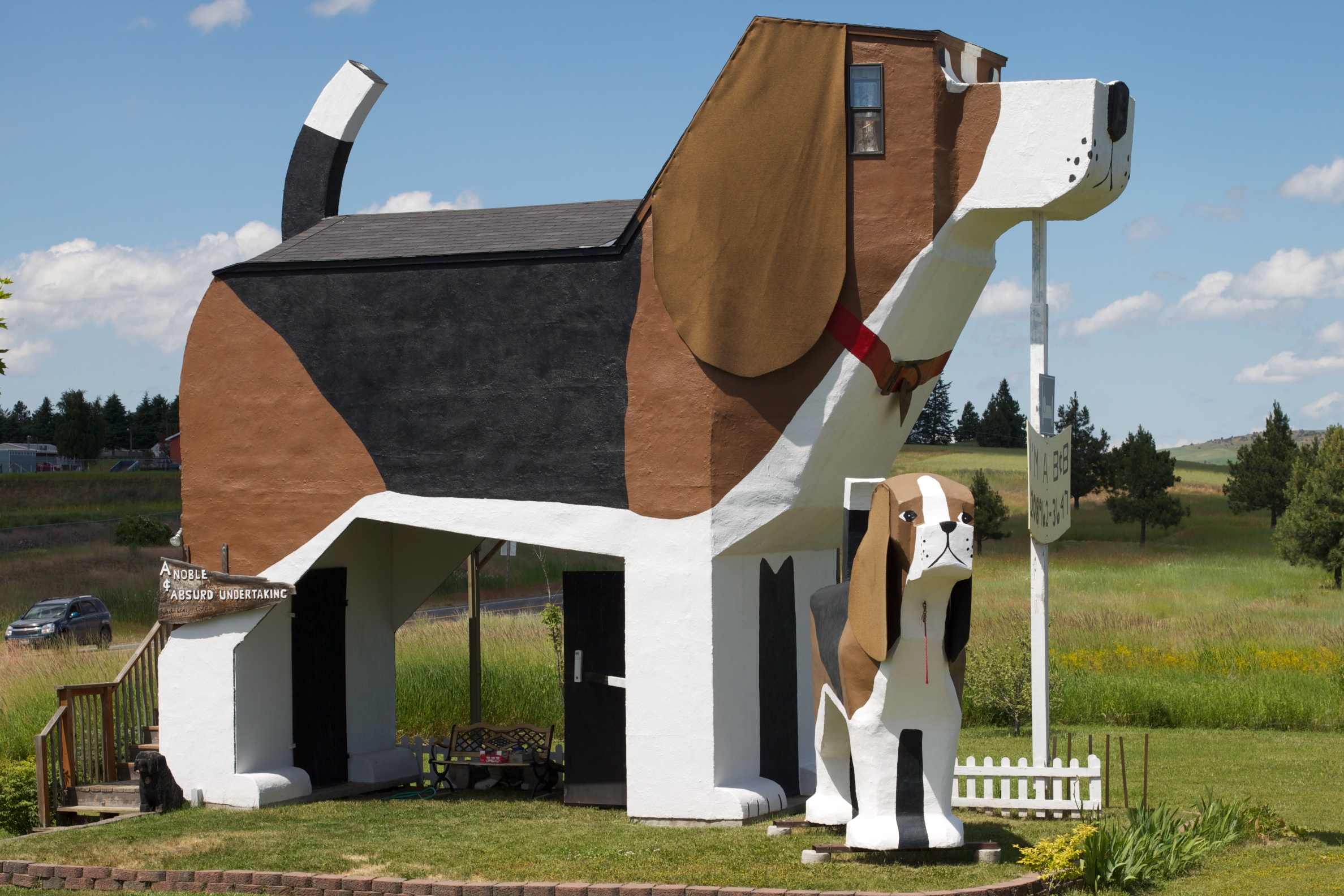
The Dog Bark Park Inn, a dog-shaped hotel room in Cottonwood

According to the United States Census Bureau, the city has a total area of 0.84 square miles (2.18 km^{2}), all of it land.

Cottonwood is home to the Dog Bark Park Inn, a hotel in the shape of a beagle.

=== Climate ===
The climate in this area has mild differences between highs and lows, and there is adequate rainfall year-round. According to the Köppen Climate Classification system, Cottonwood has a marine west coast climate, abbreviated "Cfb" on climate maps.

Climate data for Cottonwood, Idaho (1991–2020 normals, extremes 1976–present)
Month	Jan	Feb	Mar	Apr	May	Jun	Jul	Aug	Sep	Oct	Nov	Dec	Year
Record high °F (°C)	60 (16)	64 (18)	72 (22)	83 (28)	86 (30)	100 (38)	100 (38)	103 (39)	96 (36)	87 (31)	68 (20)	59 (15)	103 (39)
Mean daily maximum °F (°C)	37.1 (2.8)	40.2 (4.6)	47.6 (8.7)	53.9 (12.2)	63.0 (17.2)	69.4 (20.8)	80.6 (27.0)	81.4 (27.4)	72.2 (22.3)	57.4 (14.1)	43.6 (6.4)	35.8 (2.1)	56.9 (13.8)
Daily mean °F (°C)	30.9 (−0.6)	33.3 (0.7)	39.0 (3.9)	44.5 (6.9)	52.6 (11.4)	58.7 (14.8)	68.3 (20.2)	68.6 (20.3)	60.4 (15.8)	48.0 (8.9)	36.8 (2.7)	29.7 (−1.3)	47.6 (8.7)
Mean daily minimum °F (°C)	24.7 (−4.1)	26.3 (−3.2)	30.5 (−0.8)	35.1 (1.7)	42.2 (5.7)	48.1 (8.9)	56.1 (13.4)	55.9 (13.3)	48.7 (9.3)	38.7 (3.7)	29.9 (−1.2)	23.6 (−4.7)	38.3 (3.5)
Record low °F (°C)	−11 (−24)	−20 (−29)	4 (−16)	18 (−8)	24 (−4)	32 (0)	31 (−1)	32 (0)	25 (−4)	8 (−13)	−5 (−21)	−18 (−28)	−20 (−29)
Average precipitation inches (mm)	1.81 (46)	1.64 (42)	2.12 (54)	2.67 (68)	2.78 (71)	2.64 (67)	1.16 (29)	0.84 (21)	1.06 (27)	1.77 (45)	2.20 (56)	1.93 (49)	22.62 (575)
Average snowfall inches (cm)	16.3 (41)	11.0 (28)	8.7 (22)	1.8 (4.6)	0.3 (0.76)	0.0 (0.0)	0.0 (0.0)	0.0 (0.0)	0.1 (0.25)	0.4 (1.0)	6.3 (16)	16.5 (42)	61.4 (156)
Average precipitation days (≥ 0.01 in)	12.6	10.9	13.0	14.8	14.8	12.2	5.5	5.2	6.1	11.0	12.9	12.7	131.7
Average snowy days (≥ 0.1 in)	8.0	5.4	4.6	1.4	0.2	0.0	0.0	0.0	0.0	0.4	3.4	9.5	32.9
Source: NOAA

== Transportation ==
=== Highways ===
- - US 95 - to Lewiston (north) and Grangeville (south)

The city is just west of U.S. Route 95, the state's main north-south highway, which formerly went through central Cottonwood. It was re-routed in 1976 with the completion of the new bypass, east of the city.

=== Railroad ===
The city is the southern terminus of the BG&CM Railroad, a freight line with a northern terminus at Spalding. It runs on the former tracks of the Camas Prairie Railroad, whose second subdivision line continued to Fenn and Grangeville. The last run to Fenn and Grangeville was on November 29, 2000, and those tracks were removed by mid-2003.

== Education ==
The Cottonwood Joint School District #242 operates the public schools, led by Prairie Junior/Senior High School in Cottonwood. St. John Bosco Academy, a Catholic K-12 School, provides a classical Catholic Education.

== Notable people ==
- Don Bies, former professional golfer
- Teel Bruner, Division III college football hall of fame inductee
- Sheryl Nuxoll, state senator
- Bobby Watkins, former NFL cornerback

== See also ==
- Cottonwood Air Force Station (1958–1965)
- Cottonwood Butte
- List of cities in Idaho
