= Dog Bark Park Inn =

Novelty hotel in Idaho, United States

Dog Bark Park Inn Bed & Breakfast
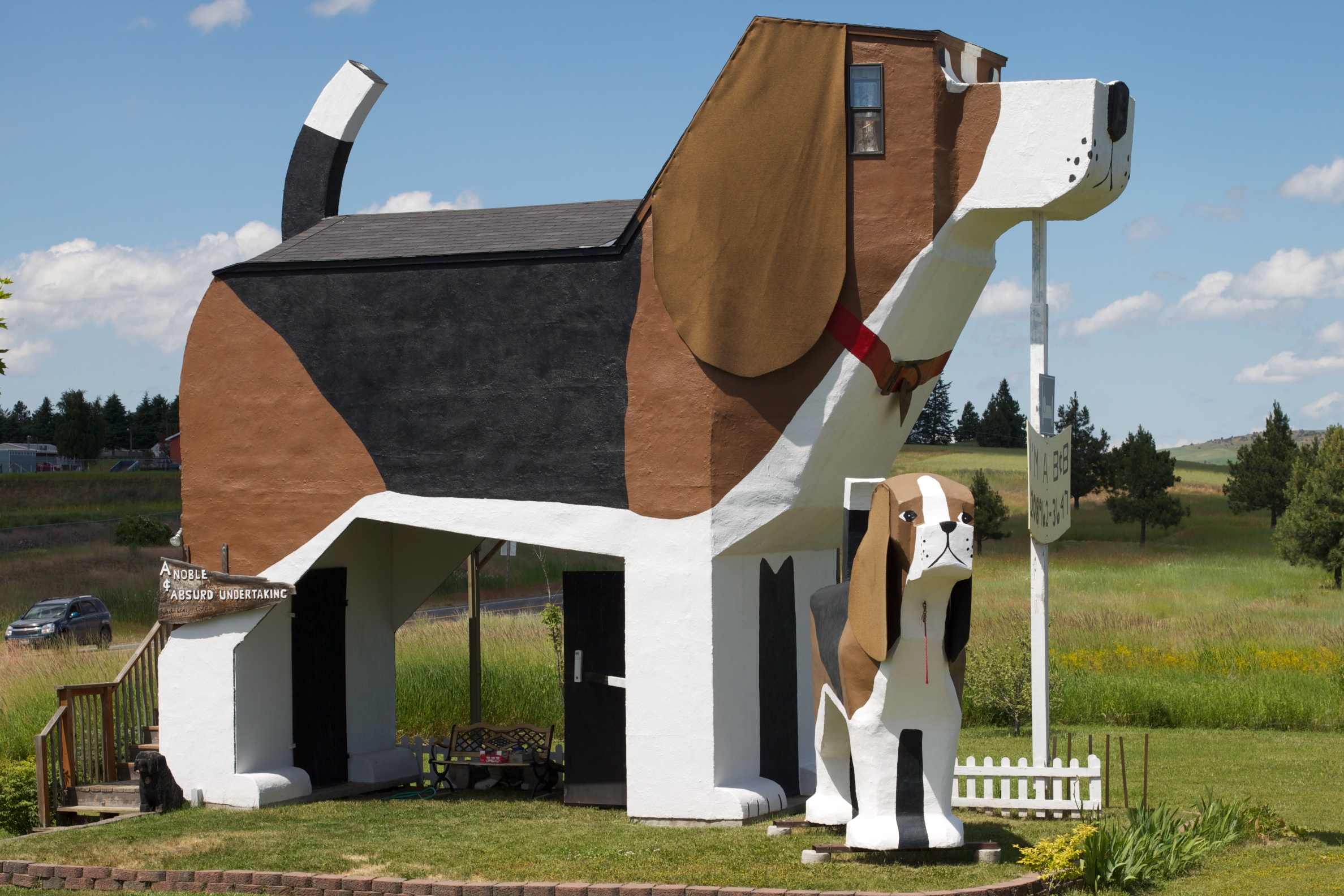
- Interactive map of the Dog Bark Park Inn Bed & Breakfast area

General information
- Location: Highway 95, Cottonwood, Idaho, United States
- Coordinates: 46.057531°N 116.344491°W
- Opening: 2003
- Owner: Dennis Sullivan and Frances Conklin

Height
- Height: 30ft

Technical details
- Floor count: 2

Design and construction
- Architect: Dennis Sullivan
- Developer: Dennis Sullivan and Frances Conklin

Other information
- Number of rooms: 1
- Number of suites: 1
- Parking: off street

Website
- Official website

The Dog Bark Park Inn was a hotel located along Highway 95 in Cottonwood, Idaho. The hotel is built in the shape of a beagle, making it a famous landmark in the state. It is colloquially known as "Sweet Willy" by local residents. The hotel, which is located in north central Idaho, is a two-bedroom bed and breakfast which also features dog-themed contents.

== History ==
Designed and building by Dennis Sullivan & Frances Conklin as the World's Biggest Beagle the bed and breakfast inn opened in August 2003 and closed in 2024.

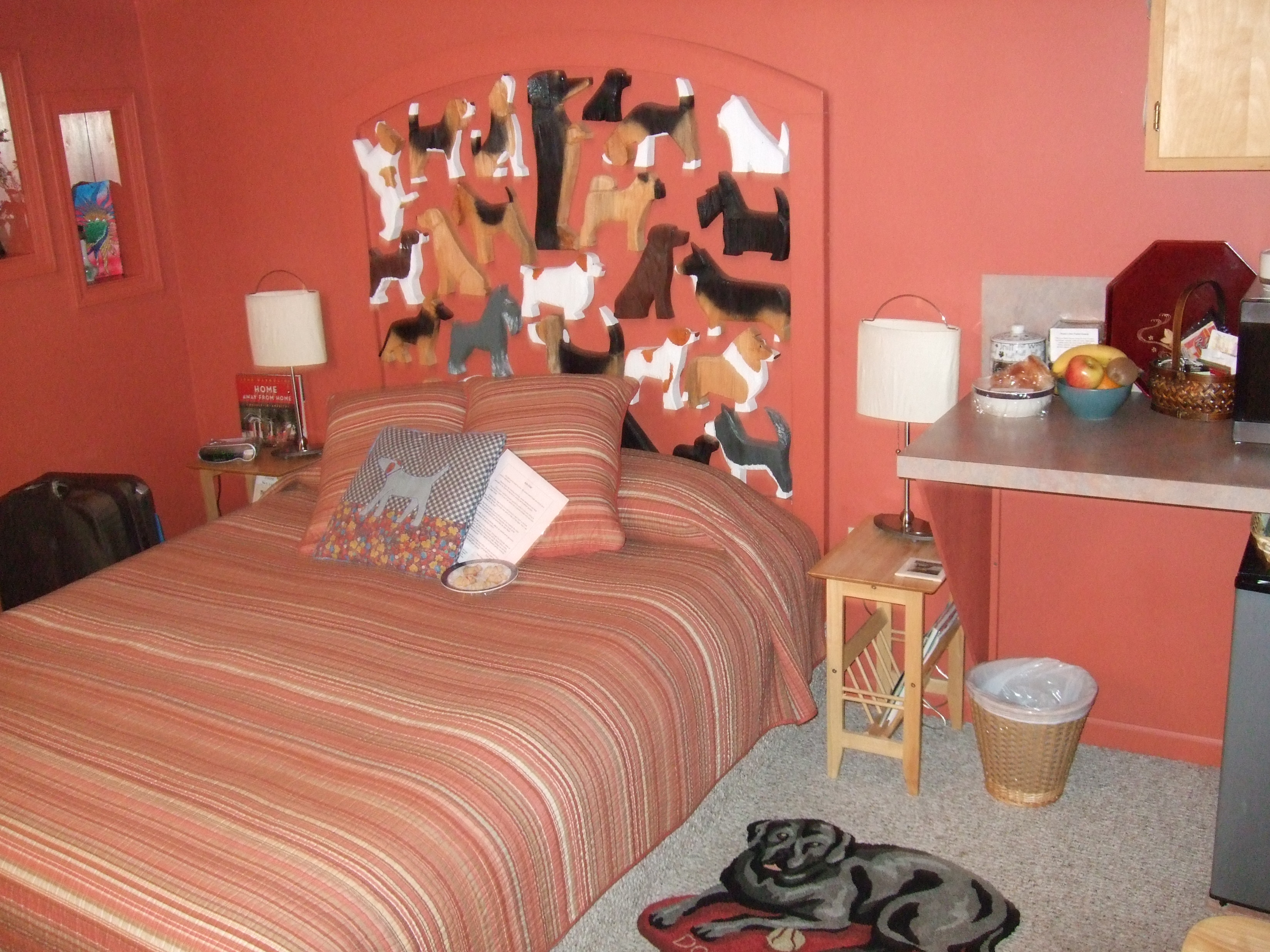
Inside the Dog Bark Park Inn

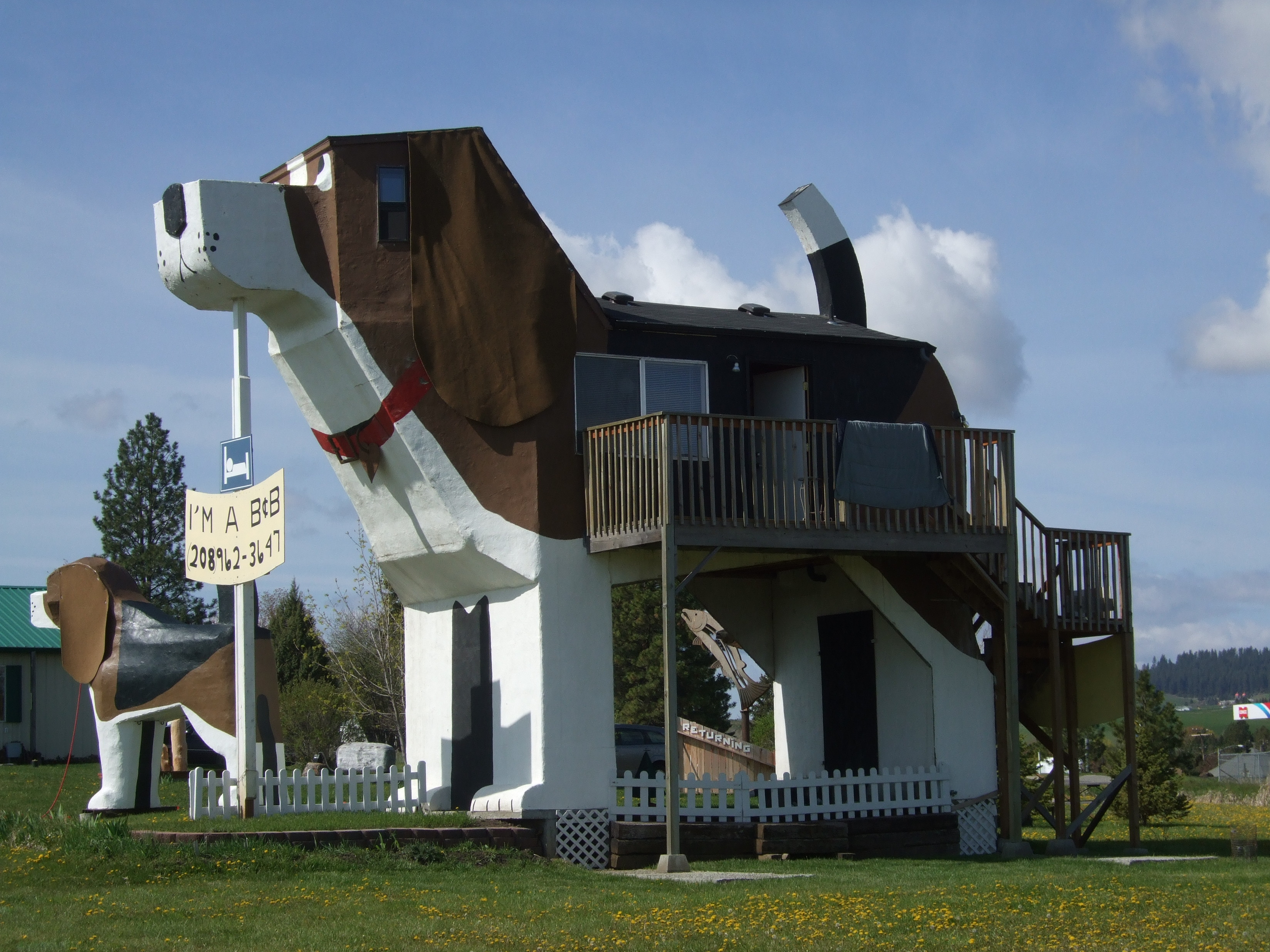
Toby and Sweet Willy Dog Bark Park Inn

== Facilities ==
Dog Bark Park consists of the bed & breakfast inn, a gift shop & visitors center, and the gallery of chainsaw artists Dennis Sullivan & Frances Conklin. Many breeds of dog carvings are prominently featured.
