= St. Maries River Railroad =

Overview
- Headquarters: St. Maries, Idaho
- Reporting mark: STMA
- Locale: Idaho
- Dates of operation: 1980–
- Predecessor: Chicago, Milwaukee, St. Paul and Pacific Railroad

Technical
- Track gauge: 4 ft 8 1/2 in (1,435 mm) standard gauge

The St. Maries River Railroad (reporting mark STMA) is a shortline Class III railroad that operates 71 miles of freight service in northern Idaho. From 1980 until 2010, it was a subsidiary of Potlatch Corp.

== History and Trackage ==
The St. Maries River Railroad began service on May 23, 1980, over trackage that previously had been owned by the bankrupt (and now-defunct) Chicago, Milwaukee, St. Paul & Pacific Railroad, also known as the Milwaukee Road.

The St. Maries River operates between Plummer, Idaho and St. Maries, Idaho on what was the Milwaukee Road's Pacific Northwest main line across the Rockies. The railroad also operated on the Milwaukee Road's former Elk River branch line between St. Maries and Bovill, Idaho.

For several years from 1980 until the mid-1980s, Potlatch also owned and operated 45 miles of adjoining former Milwaukee Road trackage, between St. Maries and Avery, Idaho, as a private logging railroad that connected with the St. Maries River Railroad. The federal government condemned the logging line between St. Maries and Avery in the mid-1980s, prompting its shutdown.

In 2010, Potlatch sold the St. Maries River Railroad for $1.6 million to Mike Williams of the Missouri-based Williams Group, which owns other short line railroads in Idaho, Missouri and South Dakota, including the BG&CM Railroad.

The St. Maries River Railroad connects with the Union Pacific Railroad at Plummer. The line to Bovill, ID is no longer in service as the connecting Washington and Idaho Railway line has been abandoned between Bovill and Harvard, ID.

== Rolling Stock ==
The railroad operates three EMD GP9 locomotives numbered 101-103 and two SW1200 switchers numbered 501–502, all formerly owned by the Chicago, Milwaukee, St. Paul & Pacific Railroad.

Locomotive model	Road no.
EMD GP9	101
EMD GP9	102
EMD GP9	103
EMD SW1200	501
EMD SW1200	502
