= Reubens, Idaho =

- City
- Location of Reubens in Lewis County, Idaho.
- Coordinates: 46°19′23″N 116°32′34″W
- Country: United States
- State: Idaho
- County: Lewis

Area
  - Total: 0.17 sq mi (0.44 km^{2})
  - Land: 0.17 sq mi (0.44 km^{2})
  - Water: 0 sq mi (0.00 km^{2})
- Elevation: 3,524 ft (1,074 m)

Population (2020)
  - Total: 46
  - Density: 378.3/sq mi (146.07/km^{2})
- Time zone: UTC-8 (Pacific (PST))
  - Summer (DST): UTC-7 (PDT)
- ZIP code: 83548
- Area code: 208
- FIPS code: 16-67150
- GNIS feature ID: 2410928

Historical population
Census	Pop.	Note	%±
1920	176		—
1930	191		8.5%
1940	119		−37.7%
1950	116		−2.5%
1960	113		−2.6%
1970	81		−28.3%
1980	87		7.4%
1990	46		−47.1%
2000	72		56.5%
2010	71		−1.4%
2019 (est.)	64		−9.9%
U.S. Decennial Census

Reubens is a city in Lewis County, Idaho, United States, on the Camas Prairie. As of the 2020 census, Reubens had a population of 46.

== Geography ==
According to the United States Census Bureau, the city has a total area of 0.29 square miles (0.75 km^{2}), all of it land.

The town is located on the northern edge of Lewis County, immediately south of the Nez Perce County line. Reubens is located on a flat, with thin and deep valleys located just over a mile to the east and west. On the west, Lapwai Creek cuts a gorge more than a thousand feet deep and carries U.S. Route 95. To the east, the valley of Big Canyon Creek reaches depths of nearly a thousand feet in the immediate vicinity of Reubens.

== Demographics ==
=== 2010 census ===
As of the census of 2010, there were 71 people, 29 households, and 20 families residing in the city. The population density was 244.8 inhabitants per square mile (94.5/km^{2}). There were 32 housing units at an average density of 110.3 per square mile (42.6/km^{2}). The racial makeup of the city was 97.2% White, 1.4% Native American, and 1.4% from two or more races.

There were 29 households, of which 41.4% had children under the age of 18 living with them, 58.6% were married couples living together, 10.3% had a female householder with no husband present, and 31.0% were non-families. 27.6% of all households were made up of individuals, and 3.4% had someone living alone who was 65 years of age or older. The average household size was 2.45 and the average family size was 2.95.

The median age in the city was 39.8 years. 28.2% of residents were under the age of 18; 4.2% were between the ages of 18 and 24; 26.9% were from 25 to 44; 33.7% were from 45 to 64; and 7% were 65 years of age or older. The gender makeup of the city was 46.5% male and 53.5% female.

=== 2000 census ===
As of the census of 2000, there were 72 people, 28 households, and 18 families residing in the city. The population density was 248.1 inhabitants per square mile (95.8/km^{2}). There were 31 housing units at an average density of 106.8 per square mile (41.2/km^{2}). The racial makeup of the city was 97.22% White, 1.39% from other races, and 1.39% from two or more races.

There were 28 households, out of which 39.3% had children under the age of 18 living with them, 57.1% were married couples living together, 3.6% had a female householder with no husband present, and 35.7% were non-families. 32.1% of all households were made up of individuals, and 7.1% had someone living alone who was 65 years of age or older. The average household size was 2.57 and the average family size was 3.33.

In the city, the population was spread out, with 33.3% under the age of 18, 29.2% from 25 to 44, 23.6% from 45 to 64, and 13.9% who were 65 years of age or older. The median age was 38 years. For every 100 females, there were 111.8 males. For every 100 females age 18 and over, there were 100.0 males.

The median income for a household in the city was $29,375, and the median income for a family was $35,417. Males had a median income of $33,750 versus $21,250 for females. The per capita income for the city was $11,078. There were 13.3% of families and 20.5% of the population living below the poverty line, including 21.2% of under eighteens and 27.3% of those over 64.

== Government ==
No government structure is on file.

== See also ==
- Lewis County, Idaho
