= North American RailNet =

North American RailNet, Inc., based in Bedford, Texas, was a holding company of short line railroads. It formerly owned the following:

Company	Date	Notes
Alberta RailNet	1999	Sold 2005 to Savage Companies
Camas Prairie RailNet	1998	Sold 2004 to Watco
Georgia and Florida RailNet	1999	Sold 2005 to OmniTRAX
Illinois RailNet	1997	Sold 2005 to OmniTRAX
Mississippi and Tennessee RailNet	1998	Sold 2003 to Ironhorse Resources
Nebraska, Kansas and Colorado RailNet	1996	Sold 2005 to OmniTRAX
