= Riparia, Washington =

Ghost town in Washington (state)

- Ghost town
- Location within Washington (state) Location within the United States
- Coordinates: 46°34′43″N 118°05′13″W
- Country: United States
- State: Washington
- County: Whitman
- Time zone: UTC-8 (Pacific (PST))
  - Summer (DST): UTC-7 (PDT)

Riparia is an extinct town in Whitman County, in the U.S. state of Washington. The GNIS classifies it as a populated place.

A post office called Riparia was in operation between 1882 and 1963. The community most likely took its name from a nearby riparian zone.

Riparia was a railway stop along the Snake River approximately 81 miles Northeast of Pasco, WA. The town featured a bridge across the Snake River and a hotel.

From April 6, 1917 (coinciding with the declaration of war on the German Empire) till October 16, 1917 a detachment of Company F 2nd Idaho Infantry garrisoned Riparia to guard railroad and waterway infrastructure from sabotage concerns. September 19, 1917 the unit was redesignated Company F, 116th Engineer Regiment, 41st Division.
