= Grangeville, Idaho =

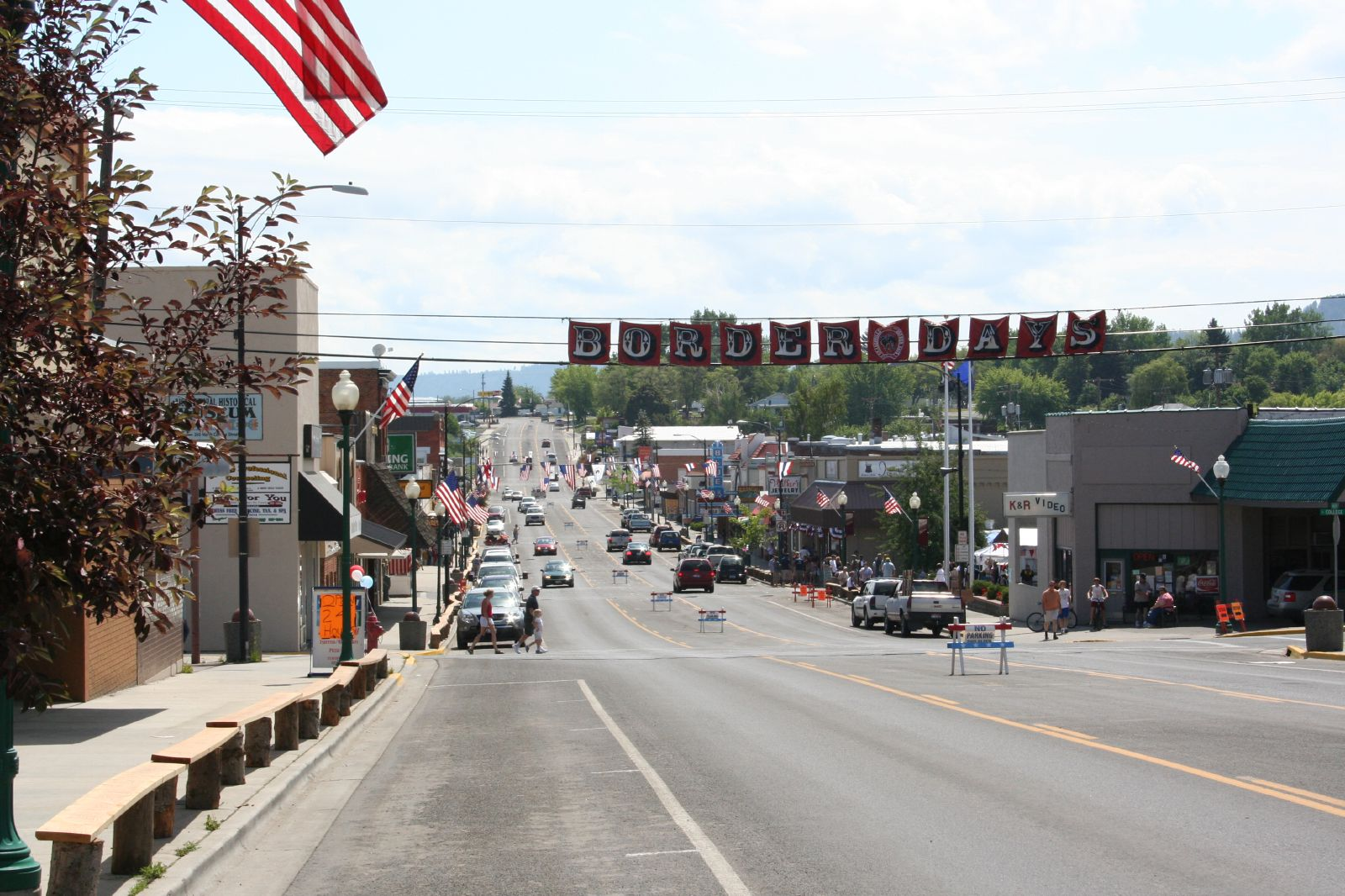
- Main Street in July 2008

- Location of Grangeville in Idaho County, Idaho.

- Location in the United States
- Coordinates: 45°55′32″N 116°07′35″W
- Country: United States
- State: Idaho
- County: Idaho

Area
  - Total: 1.51 sq mi (3.90 km^{2})
  - Land: 1.51 sq mi (3.90 km^{2})
  - Water: 0 sq mi (0.00 km^{2})
- Elevation: 3,399 ft (1,036 m)

Population (2020)
  - Total: 3,308
  - Density: 2,200/sq mi (848/km^{2})
- Time zone: UTC-8 (Pacific (PST))
  - Summer (DST): UTC-7 (PDT)
- ZIP codes: 83530-83531
- Area code: 208
- FIPS code: 16-32950
- GNIS feature ID: 2410641
- Website: www.grangeville.us

Grangeville is the largest city in and the county seat of Idaho County, Idaho, United States, in the north central part of the state. Its population was 3,308 at the 2020 census, up from 3,141 in 2010.

== Geography ==
According to the United States Census Bureau, the city has a total area of 1.45 square miles (3.76 km^{2}), all land.

Grangeville is located on the Camas Prairie, with the mountains of the Nez Perce National Forest rising just to the south of the city. U.S. Route 95 passes along the western edge of the city as it travels north-south through the state. Idaho State Highway 13 has a terminus at U.S. 95 in Grangeville, and passes through the city as Main Street. The Idaho County Airport is located one nautical mile north of the central business district.

=== Climate ===
According to the Köppen climate classification system, Grangeville has a humid continental climate (Köppen Dfb).

Climate data for Grangeville, Idaho (1991–2020 normals, extremes 1893–1906, 1927–present)
Month	Jan	Feb	Mar	Apr	May	Jun	Jul	Aug	Sep	Oct	Nov	Dec	Year
Record high °F (°C)	62 (17)	69 (21)	78 (26)	88 (31)	96 (36)	98 (37)	108 (42)	106 (41)	104 (40)	87 (31)	72 (22)	66 (19)	108 (42)
Mean daily maximum °F (°C)	37.8 (3.2)	42.0 (5.6)	49.3 (9.6)	55.8 (13.2)	63.8 (17.7)	70.3 (21.3)	82.1 (27.8)	82.5 (28.1)	72.7 (22.6)	57.6 (14.2)	44.9 (7.2)	37.0 (2.8)	58.0 (14.4)
Daily mean °F (°C)	31.2 (−0.4)	33.7 (0.9)	39.4 (4.1)	45.1 (7.3)	52.7 (11.5)	58.9 (14.9)	67.9 (19.9)	67.7 (19.8)	58.9 (14.9)	47.0 (8.3)	37.0 (2.8)	30.4 (−0.9)	47.5 (8.6)
Mean daily minimum °F (°C)	24.5 (−4.2)	25.4 (−3.7)	29.4 (−1.4)	34.4 (1.3)	41.6 (5.3)	47.5 (8.6)	53.7 (12.1)	52.9 (11.6)	45.1 (7.3)	36.5 (2.5)	29.1 (−1.6)	23.7 (−4.6)	37.0 (2.8)
Record low °F (°C)	−24 (−31)	−24 (−31)	−9 (−23)	11 (−12)	19 (−7)	27 (−3)	33 (1)	29 (−2)	19 (−7)	0 (−18)	−17 (−27)	−25 (−32)	−25 (−32)
Average precipitation inches (mm)	1.27 (32)	1.43 (36)	2.31 (59)	2.90 (74)	3.44 (87)	3.26 (83)	1.07 (27)	0.90 (23)	1.30 (33)	1.93 (49)	1.91 (49)	1.79 (45)	23.51 (597)
Average snowfall inches (cm)	7.9 (20)	6.2 (16)	6.0 (15)	3.2 (8.1)	0.2 (0.51)	0.0 (0.0)	0.0 (0.0)	0.0 (0.0)	0.0 (0.0)	0.6 (1.5)	5.0 (13)	9.6 (24)	38.7 (98)
Average precipitation days (≥ 0.01 in)	9.6	8.4	11.2	13.9	12.8	11.6	5.5	4.9	5.2	9.7	11.2	10.1	114.1
Average snowy days (≥ 0.1 in)	3.0	2.5	2.7	1.4	0.1	0.0	0.0	0.0	0.0	0.4	2.0	4.5	16.6
Source: NOAA

== Demographics ==
Historical population
Census	Pop.	Note	%±
1880	129		—
1890	540		318.6%
1900	1,132		109.6%
1910	1,534		35.5%
1920	1,439		−6.2%
1930	1,360		−5.5%
1940	1,929		41.8%
1950	2,544		31.9%
1960	3,642		43.2%
1970	3,636		−0.2%
1980	3,666		0.8%
1990	3,226		−12.0%
2000	3,228		0.1%
2010	3,141		−2.7%
2020	3,308		5.3%
U.S. Decennial Census

=== 2020 census ===
As of the 2020 census, Grangeville had a population of 3,308. The median age was 42.1 years. 24.0% of residents were under the age of 18 and 24.9% of residents were 65 years of age or older. For every 100 females there were 97.4 males, and for every 100 females age 18 and over there were 93.5 males age 18 and over.

0.0% of residents lived in urban areas, while 100.0% lived in rural areas.

There were 1,421 households in Grangeville, of which 27.7% had children under the age of 18 living in them. Of all households, 43.1% were married-couple households, 20.8% were households with a male householder and no spouse or partner present, and 29.8% were households with a female householder and no spouse or partner present. About 34.3% of all households were made up of individuals and 18.8% had someone living alone who was 65 years of age or older.

There were 1,538 housing units, of which 7.6% were vacant. The homeowner vacancy rate was 1.5% and the rental vacancy rate was 3.9%.

Racial composition as of the 2020 census
Race	Number	Percent
White	2,944	89.0%
Black or African American	13	0.4%
American Indian and Alaska Native	57	1.7%
Asian	30	0.9%
Native Hawaiian and Other Pacific Islander	0	0.0%
Some other race	77	2.3%
Two or more races	187	5.7%
Hispanic or Latino (of any race)	178	5.4%

=== 2010 census ===
As of the census of 2010, there were 3,141 people, 1,389 households, and 841 families living in the city. The population density was 2,166.2 inhabitants per square mile (836.4/km^{2}). There were 1,527 housing units at an average density of 1,053.1 per square mile (406.6/km^{2}). The racial makeup of the city was 94.8% White, 0.2% African American, 1.4% Native American, 0.6% Asian, 0.1% Pacific Islander, 0.9% from other races, and 1.9% from two or more races. Hispanic or Latino of any race were 3.6% of the population.

There were 1,389 households, of which 27.7% had children under the age of 18 living with them, 46.5% were married couples living together, 9.7% had a female householder with no husband present, 4.3% had a male householder with no wife present, and 39.5% were non-families. 35.0% of all households were made up of individuals, and 15.5% had someone living alone who was 65 years of age or older. The average household size was 2.21 and the average family size was 2.83.

The median age in the city was 44 years. 23.1% of residents were under the age of 18; 6.2% were between the ages of 18 and 24; 21.5% were from 25 to 44; 28.8% were from 45 to 64; and 20.3% were 65 years of age or older. The gender makeup of the city was 48.7% male and 51.3% female.

=== 2000 census ===
As of the census of 2000, there were 3,228 people, 1,333 households, and 857 families living in the city. The population density was 2,366.4 inhabitants per square mile (913.7/km^{2}). There were 1,474 housing units at an average density of 1,080.6 per square mile (417.2/km^{2}). The racial makeup of the city was 96.34% White, 0.03% African American, 1.15% Native American, 0.28% Asian, 0.03% Pacific Islander, 0.68% from other races, and 1.49% from two or more races. Hispanic or Latino of any race were 1.64% of the population.

There were 1,333 households, out of which 31.2% had children under the age of 18 living with them, 52.1% were married couples living together, 9.1% had a female householder with no husband present, and 35.7% were non-families. 32.5% of all households were made up of individuals, and 15.2% had someone living alone who was 65 years of age or older. The average household size was 2.34 and the average family size was 2.96.

In the city, the population was spread out, with 25.8% under the age of 18, 5.6% from 18 to 24, 24.0% from 25 to 44, 24.3% from 45 to 64, and 20.3% who were 65 years of age or older. The median age was 42 years. For every 100 females, there were 87.7 males. For every 100 females age 18 and over, there were 83.1 males.

The median income for a household in the city was $27,984, and the median income for a family was $34,625. Males had a median income of $27,369 versus $16,179 for females. The per capita income for the city was $14,774. About 10.6% of families and 13.6% of the population were below the poverty line, including 15.0% of those under the age of 18 and 10.4% of those 65 and older.

== Arts and culture ==
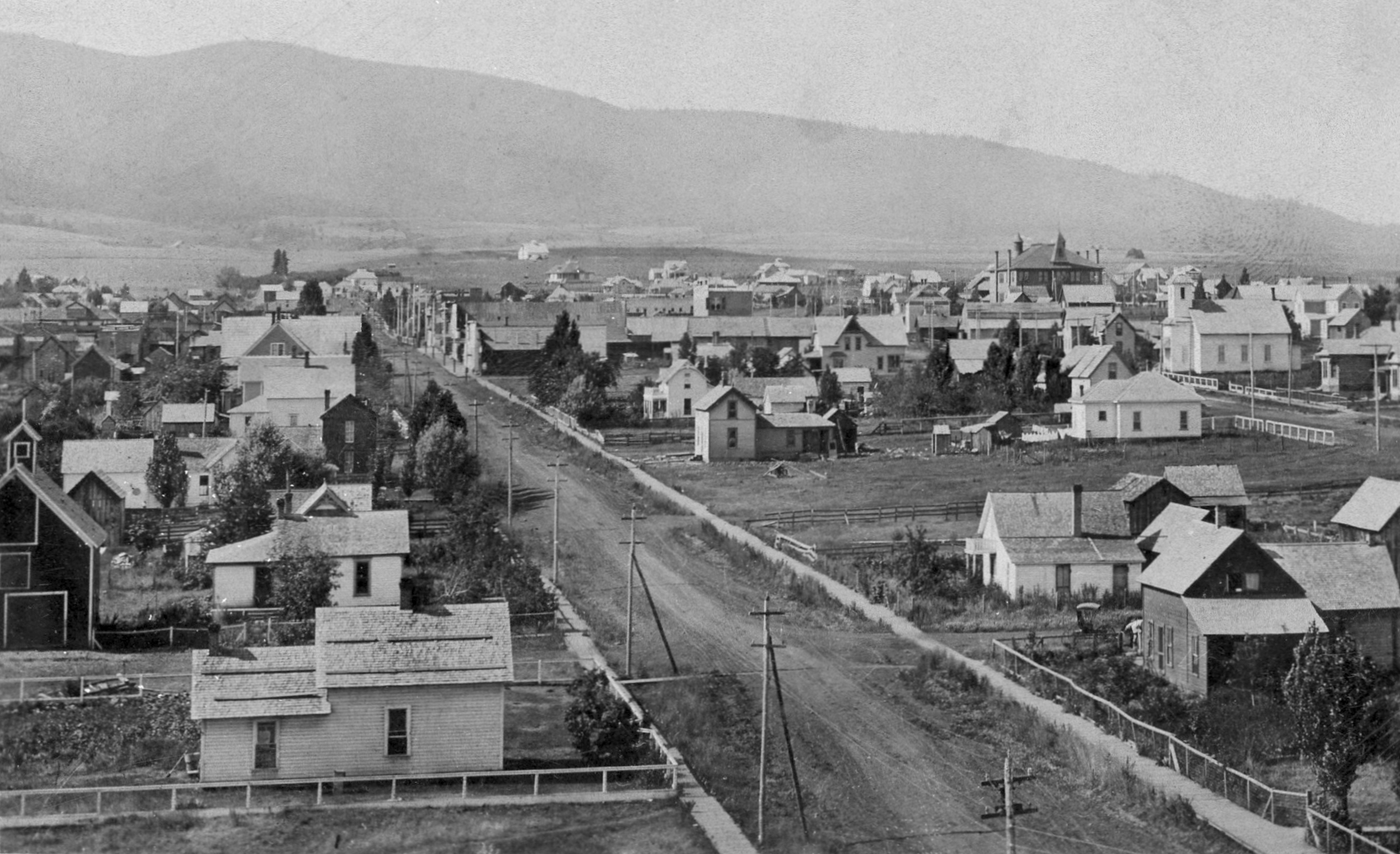
Grangeville, circa 1910

Grangeville's "Border Days" is a large public celebration on the weekend of July 4 (Independence Day), which features the state's oldest rodeo as well as parades, art shows, and the world's largest egg toss.

== Media ==
The Idaho County Free Press is the primary newspaper for the city and is recognized as the oldest weekly newspaper in Idaho, having been founded in 1886. Additionally, the Clearwater Progress is a weekly newspaper that serves the Grangeville, Kamiah, and Nezperce communities. Several radio stations are licensed to or operate within Grangeville, including KORT (AM) 1230, and KORT-FM 92.7. There is an affiliate of Northwest Public Broadcasting, known as KNWO on 90.1, which is licensed to nearby Cottonwood. In addition, the community is served by several religious radio stations. Grangeville receives broadcast television signals from the Spokane and Lewiston markets mostly via local translators. Local affiliates include KREM (CBS), KXLY-TV (ABC), KHQ-TV (NBC), and KAYU (FOX) from Spokane, as well as KLEW-TV (CBS) from Lewiston. Idaho Public Television is available via KUID (PBS) licensed to Moscow.

== Education ==
Grangeville's public schools are operated by Grangeville School District #246, headed by Grangeville High School at the southern end of the city.

== Infrastructure ==
=== Transportation ===
==== Highways ====
- – US 95 – to Lewiston and Moscow (north) and Riggins and Boise (south)
- – SH-13 – to Kooskia and Missoula, Montana (north)

==== Airport ====
Idaho County Airport is a county-owned, public-use airport located north of the central business district of Grangeville.

==== Railroad ====
For over nine decades, the Camas Prairie Railroad served the city. Grangeville was the eastern terminus of its second subdivision, known as the "Railroad on Stilts" due to its abundant timber trestles. Citing lack of profitability, its new owners received permission from the federal government to abandon the line in 2000. The final freight run to Grangeville was on November 29, and the 17 miles (27 km) of track from Grangeville to Cottonwood were removed in 2003 for salvage. The line was revived by BG&CM, but now terminates in Cottonwood. Passenger service to Grangeville was discontinued decades earlier, in August 1955.

== Notable people ==
- Skip Brandt, former state senator
- George Cowgill, anthropologist and archaeologist, specialist in Mesoamerica
- Warren Cowgill, historical linguist, specialist in Indo-European languages
- Matt Hill, NFL tackle (2002–05)
- Len Jordan, governor (1951–55) and U.S. senator (1962–73)
- Charlotte May Pierstorff, known for being shipped through mail by U.S. Post Office parcel post at age five in 1914
- Larry Ramos, Grammy award-winning singer, best known as part of the 1960s pop band the Association
- Ken Schrom, MLB pitcher (1980–87); born and raised in Grangeville
