= Spalding, Idaho =

Place in Nez Perce County, Idaho, US

- Unincorporated community
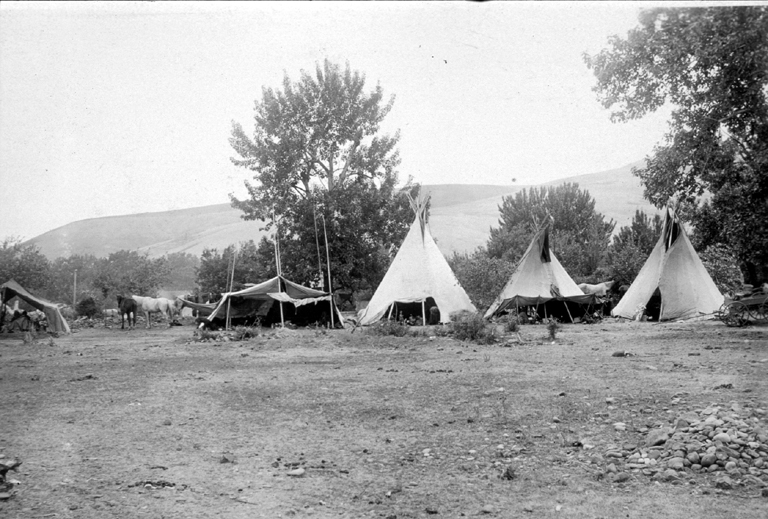
- Nez Perce encampment at Spalding, 1899

- Location within Idaho Location within the United States
- Coordinates: 46°26′47″N 116°49′06″W
- Country: United States
- State: Idaho
- County: Nez Perce
- Time zone: UTC-8 (Pacific (PST))
  - Summer (DST): UTC-7 (PDT)
- ZIP code: 83540
- Area codes: 208, 986
- GNIS feature ID: 397192

Spalding is an unincorporated community in the northwest United States, located in northern Nez Perce County, Idaho.

== Description ==
The community is located ten miles (16 km) east and upstream of Lewiston, on the Clearwater River, at the mouth of the Lapwai Valley. U.S. Route 95 runs through the community and has a junction with U.S. Route 12 just west of town. Spalding is part of the Lewiston, ID-WA Metropolitan Statistical Area. The village was named after Reverend Henry Spalding, a missionary who taught the neighboring Nez Percé irrigation.

The headquarters and visitor center for the Nez Perce National Historical Park are located at Spalding.

This place is notable as the birthplace of Lillian Disney, the wife of Walt Disney.

In the 1966 film El Dorado, John Wayne rode a six-year-old Appaloosa stallion named Zip, from Spalding.
