= Camas prairie =

Grassland areas in the western United States

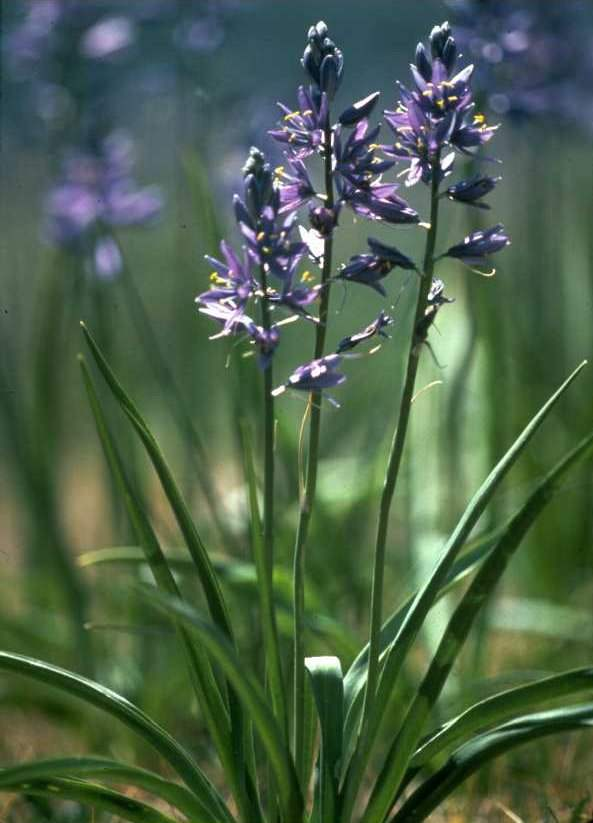
Indian Camas (Camassia quamash)

Camas prairies are found in several different geographical areas in the western United States, and are named for the native perennial camas (Camassia). The culturally and scientifically significant of these areas lie within Idaho, Montana, and the Pacific Northwest. Camas bulbs are an important food source for Native Americans.

== Idaho ==
=== History ===
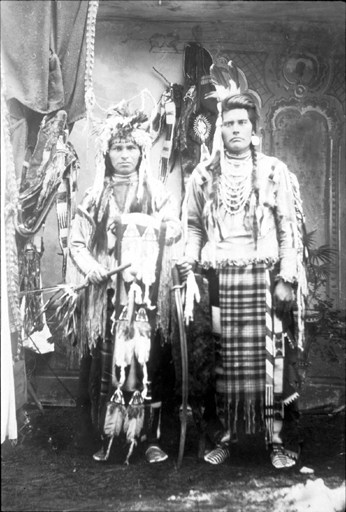
Nez Perce chiefs, 1899

Named for the blue flowering camas—an important food source for all Native Americans in the interior Northwest—the Camas prairie is a traditional Nez Perce gathering place in north central Idaho.

From the Nez Perce National Historical Park: Camas prairie is interpreted at a highway pullout on the north side of U.S. Highway 95, about six miles (10 km) south of Grangeville. This large prairie was a Nez Perce gathering place, where camas roots were harvested for thousands of years. Several nontreaty bands gathered at Tolo Lake in early June 1877 in anticipation of moving to the Nez Perce reservation. In response to the forced move and other hostile actions, several young Nez Perce people took actions that precipitated the Nez Perce War.

Camas prairies are found over a large area, mostly privately owned, that extends many miles between the Salmon and Clearwater River drainages. Most of the area is agricultural and the northern section is within the Nez Perce Indian Reservation. Similar to the opening of lands in Oklahoma, the U.S. government opened the reservation for white settlement on November 18, 1895. The proclamation had been signed less than two weeks earlier by President Cleveland.

The area was home to the second subdivision of the Camas Prairie Railroad, known as the "railroad on stilts" due to its numerous trestles, most of which are constructed of timber. Breakheart Pass, a 1975 film starring Charles Bronson, was filmed on portions of the railroad on the Camas prairie. The railroad ceased operations in the late 1990s.

=== Counties ===
- Camas County—In southern Idaho
- Idaho County
- Lewis County

=== Southern Idaho ===
In southern Idaho, east of Mountain Home, the high plain of Camas County around Fairfield is locally called the "Camas Prairie".

=== Protected areas ===
- Camas Prairie Centennial Marsh Wildlife Management Area

== Montana ==
The Camas Prairie covers the floor of the Camas Prairie Basin in Sanders County. This basin is a distinct north–south oriented elliptical basin that is drained by Camas Creek into the Flathead River at Perma, Montana. Both the prairie and basin are surrounded by north–south trending mountain ranges except where Camas Creek drains into the Flathead River. The basin is about 7 by 13 km (4.3 by 8.1 mi) in dimensions with an area of about 90 km^{2} (35 sq mi). The center of this relatively flat basin lies at elevations just below 850 m (2,790 ft). The basin is bordered by the Salish Mountains on its eastern side and northern end and bordered by the Cabinet Mountains on its western side. These mountains rise above elevations of 1,500 to 1,600 m (4,900 to 5,200 ft).

The Camas prairie region is sparsely populated and lies within the Flathead Indian Reservation. The two main populated places within this region are Camas (Ktunaxa: ya·qa·kmumaǂki) and Perma (Ktunaxa: kxunamaʔnam)

=== Bedrock geology ===
The basin in which the Camas prairie lies is a low-relief valley surrounded by mountains composed of metasedimentary strata that belong to the Prichard Formation of the Belt Supergroup. These strata are intensively folded and thrust faulted. The basin is filled with undifferentiated Cenozoic red, greenish, and bluish siltstone and mudstone and volcanic rock. A few sandy and gravelly beds are also present. These strata outcrop at the surface around the perimeter of the basin. Within the basin, they are cover by 15 to 30 m (49 to 98 ft) of Quaternary deposits that accumulated within glacial Lake Missoula.

=== Quaternary geology ===
The Camas prairie is well known for the large fields of Late Pleistocene giant current ripples that cover a substantial part of its surface. They were created during one of the many times when glacial Lake Missoula drained when its ice dam failed. From the northern edge of the Camas Basin, the fields of giant current ripples extend south (downcurrent) from four mountain passes that were once submerge inlets into the flooded Camas Basin. Southward, these fields of giant current ripples spread out and merge on the basin floor. These sedimentary bedforms are best seen in aerial images and at low sun angles.

These giant current ripples are large-to-very-large subaqueous gravel dunes and antidunes. Although they once covered a significantly larger area, they cover about 26 km^{2} (10 sq mi) of the Camas prairie basin. The wavelength of these dunes and antidunes ranges from 90 to 951 m (295 to 3,120 ft) and their height ranges from 0.3–17 m (0.98–55.77 ft). They are all two-dimensional, flow transverse, sinuous, sedimentary bedforms. The wavelength and height of these giant current ripples decrease away (downcurrent) from the former inlets. Correspondingly, the size of the gravels comprising them decreases south (downcurrent) from boulder and cobble gravels to pebble gravels. Their foreset bedding is poorly defined and their dip varies from 14 to 23 degrees. In addition to the gravel dunes and antidunes, delta-like, expansion bars accumulated below each of the former subaqueous inlets. They consist of foreset beds that consist of boulder-cobble-pebble gravels.

The Pleistocene deposits and bedforms in the basin have not been dated using radiometric dating methods. The lack of absolute dates prevents the construction of a reliable geochronology for Lake Missoula lake drainage events in the Camas prairie basin and correlation of the giant current ripples with bedforms and sedimentary deposits outside of it.

The exposed gravel deposits underlying the giant current ripples at Camas prairie exhibit at least two beds of gravelly deposits that are indicative of deposition by separate Missoula floods. They are separated by an erosional unconformity with a buried and dismembered calcrete, carbonate soil horizon. The calcrete is 15 to 25 cm (5.9 to 9.8 in) thick. It provides empirical evidence of at least two separate periods of giant current ripple activity and associated with separate Missoula Floods that occurred thousands of years apart based the thickness and development of the calcrete.

The giant current ripples of the Camas prairie are analogous to similar giant Pleistocene bedforms described form Channeled Scablands of Washington. They are identical to the giant subaqueous bedforms that developed on the bottom of Lake Kuray-Chuya during the Altai flood in Siberia, Russia. These giant bedforms, which are rare or unknown outside of theoretical and experimental studies, preserved a unique record of the paleohydraulology of a Missoula Flood associated with the catastrophic emptying of Lake Missoula.

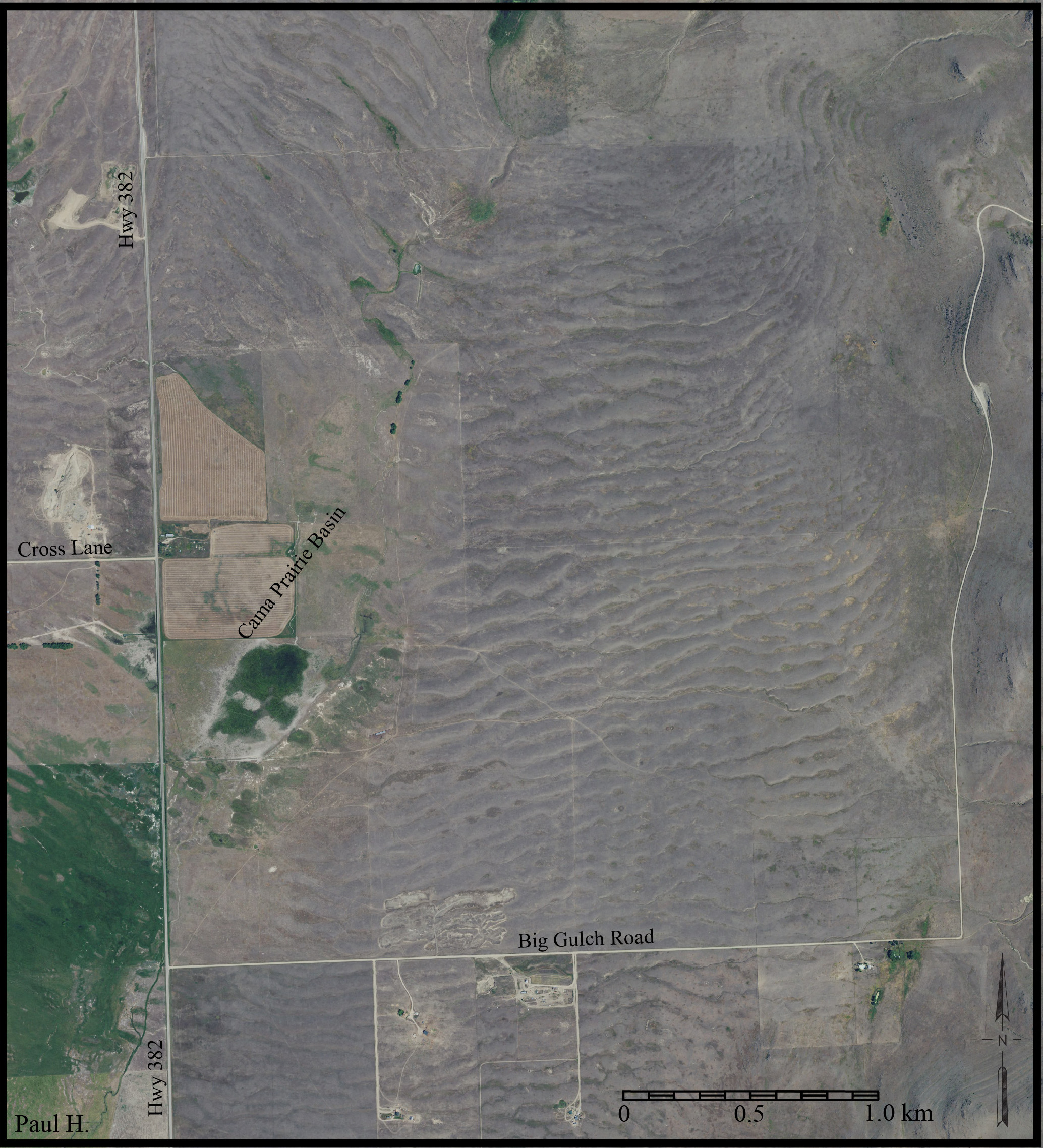
Aerial view of giant ripple marks near Camas Hot Springs, Montana, U.S.

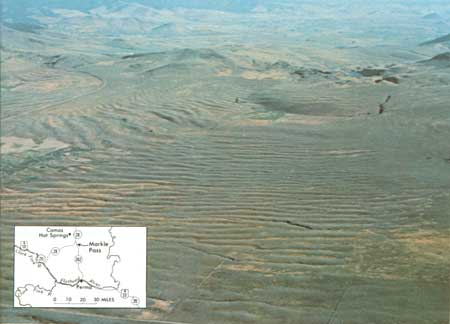
Oblique aerial view of giant ripple marks in Camas Basin, Montana, U.S.

== Oregon ==
Quamash Prairie Natural Area is a prairie in Washington County, Oregon that is specifically managed for the harvest and consumption of camas by the Indigenous community. The land is co-administered by Oregon Metro and the Confederated Tribes of Grand Ronde.

Camassia Natural Area in West Linn is managed by the Nature Conservancy.

== Washington ==
The Burke Meadow, supported by the Burke Museum, is a camas meadow that was established in 2019 to promote tourism and traditional food use. It is maintained by University of Washington students and local Indigenous organizations.

Camas Meadows Natural Area Preserve and Lacamas Prairie Natural Area, both protected by the Washington Department of Natural Resources, support camas populations.

== See also ==
- Ice Age Floods National Geologic Trail
- Palouse
