= RailTerm =

- Industry: Rail Transport Services
- Founded: 1996
- Founder: Geoffrey Chambers; Robert Wheeler
- Headquarters: Dorval, Quebec, Canada
- Area served: Canada; United States
- Key people: François Prénovost Partner; Robert Wheeler Partner
- Products: TrainMaster RTC Software
- Services: Rail Traffic Control, Railway Systems Design, Track & Signal Maintenance, Terminal Management
- Subsidiaries: Rail-Term Corp, RailTerm Systems
- Website: www.railterm.com

RailTerm is a North American corporation which provides rail operation services including dispatching, track and signal maintenance, as well as intermodal terminal management. The company also provides signals, communications, and software systems, as well as licenses the TrainMaster Rail Traffic Control (RTC) software to independent railroads. In Canada, Rail-Term Inc. is located in Dorval, Quebec and Mississauga, Ontario. In the United States, RailTerm operates from Rutland, Vermont.

== History ==
Rail-Term Inc. was formed in 1996, by partners Geoffrey Chambers and Robert Wheeler of the Cygnus Group, to supply outsourced rail services. That year, RailTerm bid on and secured the contract to manage an intermodal terminal for Canadian Pacific's Expressway Service in Montreal. Founded at a time of industry deregulation and sale of short-line railroads, Chambers and Wheeler also established Genesee Rail-One (now Genesee & Wyoming Canada). RailTerm then began rail operations services and, in 1999, provided track and signal maintenance as well as dispatch services to Via Rail and OC Transpo's Capital Railway in 2000. As regional railways rely on dark territory control in addition to a centralized traffic control system (CTC), RailTerm developed a web-based dispatch software which integrated both functions. Called the TrainMaster, the software was used by RailTerm in outsourced, rail traffic control contracts as well as licensed to independent railroads for their own dispatch services. In 2005, the company established Rail-Term Corp. in Rutland, Vermont, to provide rail traffic control services in the United States. By 2010, RailTerm's terminal operations in Montreal had expanded to include Canadian Pacific's Toronto's Expressway service in Milton and Agincourt, and, by 2013, Canadian Pacific's intermodal terminals in Vaughan, Ontario, and Lachine, Quebec.

In December 2010, RailTerm provided rail traffic control (RTC) services for more than 20 rail lines, covering 4,300 miles of track throughout North America. In December 2011, the company provided dispatch services to: Via Rail, Genesee & Wyoming's Huron Central Railway, Quebec Gatineau Railway and St Lawrence & Atlantic Railroad, as well as OmniTRAX's Carlton Trail Railway and Hudson Bay Railway In the United States, Rail-Term Corp. provided dispatching services to: Genesee & Wyoming's St Lawrence & Atlantic Railroad; OmniTRAX's Alabama & Tennessee River Railway, Georgia & Florida Railway, Illinois Railway, Kettle Falls International Railway, Panhandle Northern Railroad and the Nebraska Kansas Colorado Railway; as well as the Aberdeen Carolina and Western Railway, Carolina Coastal Railway and the Washington and Idaho Railway. In 2016, RailTerm also provided dispatch services to Southern Railway of British Columbia, Southern Railway of Vancouver Island, Alberta Prairie, Quebec North Shore & Labrador Railway, Société de chemin de fer de la Gaspésie, CMQ Canada in addition to NBM Railways' New Brunswick Southern Railway, Maine Northern Railway and Eastern Maine Railway and the Central Maine & Quebec Railway.

== Service segments ==
Rail-Term provides rail traffic control services, track and signal maintenance as well as intermodal terminal management. The company also designs and commissions track circuits, signalling systems and control-center software. RailTerm's systems group designs and implements new technological tools for rail operations including dispatch software, mobile technologies and communications systems for track, signal and rail traffic control clients. This includes complex field-signal systems to RTC software with management reporting tools.

Rail Traffic Control Services RailTerm offers dispatch services to freight railways, intercity passenger and commuter trains. To coordinate safe train movement and maintenance, the company developed a web-based software, the TrainMaster, an integrated centralized Rail Traffic Control (RTC) system with dark territory control. The software operates on mobile devices to allow managers, dispatchers and rail maintenance crews to communicate simultaneously. The TrainMaster is used at RailTerm's dispatch centers in Dorval, Quebec, and Rutland, Vermont, and is also licensed to independent railroads.

Track and Signal Maintenance RailTerm carries out day-to-day track, signal and structure maintenance. The company manages major installation and repair projects for railroads including infrastructure upgrades in addition to renewal investments. It also advises clients such as Via Rail on new technologies and safety measures.

Intermodal Terminal Management RailTerm has operated Canadian Pacific's Expressway service in Montreal, Quebec, and Milton, Ontario, since 1996, and CPR's intermodal terminals in Vaughan, Ontario, and Lachine, Quebec, since 2013. Daily operations include loading and unloading freight to train or truck in addition to management of yard inventory as a "'just-in-time' operation".

== TrainMaster Dispatch Software ==
RailTerm developed a bilingual (English-French) Rail Traffic Control (RTC) dispatch software, the TrainMaster, which it licenses to independent railroads. The TrainMaster is a web-based Windows application which integrates the Daily Operating Bulletins (DOB), General Bulletin Orders (GBO), Tabular General Bulletin Orders (TGBO) with centralized traffic control (CTC) and dark territory authority. RailTerm customizes the software to accommodate multiple rule sets (Canadian Rail Operating Rules (CROR), General Code of Operating Rules (GROR), and Norfolk Southern rules). According to the company's website, the TrainMaster is licensed to Rio Tinto, Canadian Pacific, OC Transpo, Via Rail, Quebec North Shore & Labrador Railway and Mines Wabush in Canada. It is also licensed to the Iowa Pacific and Western New York & Pennsylvania Railroad in the United States, as well as ArcellorMittal in Liberia.

== Company organization ==
RailTerm is a privately owned corporation with headquarters in Dorval, Quebec, Canada. Rail-Term Inc. is an associate member of the Railway Association of Canada (RAC), and the Canadian Association of Railway Suppliers (CARS). RailTerm is also a member of the Railway Systems Suppliers, Inc. (RSS1), and its American subsidiary Rail-Term Corp. is a member of the American Short Line and Regional Railroad Association. A second subsidiary, RailTerm Systems Inc. (formerly Centre-Rail Control Inc.) is located in Mississauga, Ontario, and in Dorval, Quebec.

Partners

- Geoffrey Chambers
- Robert Wheeler
- François Prénovost
