= Jake Award =

The Jake Award is an annual award presented to North American short line (Class III) railroads by rail transport industry group American Short Line and Regional Railroad Association. The award recognizes railroads with a frequency-severity index (FSI) rating of 0.00, thus having no FRA reportable injuries.

== 2007 Award Winners ==
- Aberdeen, Carolina and Western Railway
- Alabama and Tennessee River Railway
- Alliance Terminal Railroad
- Alexander Railroad
- Angelina and Neches River Railroad
- Ann Arbor Railroad
- Appalachian and Ohio Railroad
- Arkansas Midland Railroad
- Arkansas and Missouri Railroad
- Belt Railway of Chicago
- Birmingham Southern Railroad
- Brandywine Valley Railroad
- Brownsville and Rio Grande International Railroad
- Cedar Rapids and Iowa City Railway
- Central Oregon and Pacific Railroad
- Chicago South Shore and South Bend Railroad
- Clarendon and Pittsford Railroad
- Cloquet Terminal Railroad
- Columbia and Cowlitz Railway
- Columbus and Ohio River Rail Road
- Corpus Christi Terminal Railroad
- East Camden and Highland Railroad
- Eastern Illinois Railroad
- Elgin, Joliet and Eastern Railway
- Escanaba and Lake Superior Railroad
- Farmrail Corporation
- Finger Lakes Railway
- Florida Northern Railroad
- Georgetown Railroad
- Golden Isles Terminal Railroad
- Grainbelt Corporation
- Great Northwest Railroad
- Great Smoky Mountains Railroad
- Great Western Railway of Colorado
- Huron and Eastern Railway
- Idaho Northern and Pacific Railroad
- Illinois and Midland Railroad
- Indiana Northeastern Railroad
- Indiana and Ohio Railway
- Iowa Interstate Railroad
- Kansas and Oklahoma Railroad
- Kaw River Railroad
- Kiamichi Railroad
- Kyle Railroad
- Lake Michigan and Indiana Railroad
- Lake State Railway
- Lake Superior and Ishpeming Railroad
- Louisiana and Delta Railroad
- Louisiana Southern Railroad
- Manufacturers Railway
- Marquette Rail
- Maryland and Delaware Railroad
- Michigan Shore Railroad
- Minnesota, Dakota and Western Railway
- Mission Mountain Railroad
- Mississippi Export Railroad
- Missouri and Northern Arkansas Railroad
- Modesto and Empire Traction Company
- Montana Rail Link
- Morristown and Erie Railway
- Nebraska Central Railroad
- Nebraska Northeastern Railway
- New England Central Railroad
- New Orleans Public Belt Railroad
- New York and Atlantic Railway
- Northern Plains Railroad
- Paducah and Louisville Railway
- Panhandle Northern Railroad
- Patapsco and Back Rivers Railroad
- Pioneer Valley Railroad
- Port of Tillamook Bay Railroad
- Progressive Rail
- San Joaquin Valley Railroad
- Santa Fe Southern Railway
- Savannah Port Terminal Railroad
- South Branch Valley Railroad
- South Carolina Central Railroad
- South Central Florida Express
- St. Maries River Railroad
- Steelton and Highspire Railroad
- Stillwater Central Railroad
- Tacoma Rail
- Tennessee Southern Railroad
- Terminal Railroad Association of St. Louis
- Terminal Railway Alabama State Docks
- Texas and Northern Railway
- Texas North Western Railway
- Timber Rock Railroad
- Trona Railway
- Twin Cities and Western Railroad
- Union Railroad
- Utah Railway
- Vicksburg Southern Railroad
- West Tennessee Railroad
- Western Maryland Scenic Railroad
- Western New York and Pennsylvania Railroad
- Wheeling and Lake Erie Railway
- Wisconsin and Southern Railroad
