= Illinois Railway =

Overview
- Parent company: OmniTRAX
- Headquarters: Ottawa, Illinois
- Reporting mark: IR
- Locale: Northern Illinois
- Dates of operation: 1997–present
- Predecessor: BNSF

Technical
- Track gauge: 4 ft 8 1/2 in (1,435 mm) standard gauge
- Length: 113 miles (182 km)

Other
- Website: omnitrax.com/our-company/our-railroads/illinois-railway-llc

The Illinois Railway (reporting mark IR), formerly Illinois Railnet, is a shortline railroad operating in Northern Illinois owned by OmniTRAX. It operates 113 miles (182 km) of former BNSF trackage. It was created in 1997 and operates four lines in Northern Illinois.

== Lines ==
ID	From	To	Trackage Rights	Acquired	Operations	Route Map
Ottawa Branch	Streator, Illinois	Montgomery, Illinois	From Montgomery to BNSF's Eola Yard in Aurora	December 1997	Switching at U.S. Silica in Ottawa (Job 103/203); Switching in Wedron (Job 108/208); Transfers between Ottawa and Wedron (Job 104); Daily freight from Ottawa to Eola (Job 104 to Wedron and Job 206 to Eola); Daily freight from Eola to Wedron (Job 206); Ottawa to Streator used for rail car storage only	dCONTgq ABZq+l dCONTfq HST KRZ ABZg+l ABZg+r KHSTe
La Salle Branch	La Salle	Zearing		2004	Daily from Peru Industrial to Zearing, back to Peru. Occasional freight from LaSalle (Job 105)	dCONTgq ABZq+r dCONTfq HST ABZql
Oregon Branch	Mount Morris	Oregon	Oregon to Flagg Center	2004	Daily Unit Sand to West Oregon; Occasional Freight From Oregon to Mt. Morris	KHSTa HST dCONTgq ABZql dCONTfq
Rockford Branch	Flagg Center	Rockford	Flagg Center to Oregon	January 1999	Nightly	KHSTa v-SHI3+l; v-STR+4; lCONTf4 xSHI3gr v-STR2 KBSTxa; STRc3 STRc1 STR; ABZ4+fl dCONTfq HST dCONTgq KRZlr ABZqlr

== Trackage rights ==
- Montgomery to Eola
- Power only Oregon to Aurora
- Power only Zearing to Montgomery

== Locomotives ==
ID	Model	Location	Notes
GMTX 2698	EMD GP38-2	Rockford Branch	
OMLX 3807	EMD GP38-3	Ottawa Branch	Née-Union Pacific, ex-OMLX 916, ex-Helm Leasing Company
OMLX 3808	EMD GP38-3	Ottawa Branch	Rebuilt EMD GP40, ex-OMLX 1019, Née-Union Pacific, ex Helm Leasing Company
OMLX 2525	EMD GP38-3	Ottawa Branch	Rebuilt EMD GP40, Née-Union Pacific, ex Helm Leasing Company
OMLX 6296	EMD SD40-2	Ottawa Branch	ex-Burlington Northern
OMLX 7193	EMD SD40-2	Ottawa Branch	Née-Burlington Northern, ex Helm Leasing Company
OMLX 7233	EMD SD40-2	Ottawa Branch	Née-Burlington Northern, ex Helm Leasing Company
OMLX 8163	EMD SD40-2	Ottawa Branch	Née-Burlington Northern Railroad, ex Helm Leasing Company
OMLX 5009	EMD SD50	LaSalle Branch	ex-Union Pacific, Hudson Bay Railway
OMLX 5006	EMD SD50	LaSalle Branch	ex-Union Pacific, Hudson Bay Railway
OMLX 5001	EMD SD50	Oregon Branch	ex-Union Pacific, Hudson Bay Railway
OMLX 5008	EMD SD50	Oregon Branch	ex-Union Pacific, Hudson Bay Railway
OMLX 3500	EMD GP35	Rockford Branch	ex-Southern Pacific

=== Former Locomotives ===
ID	Model	Location	Notes
NREX 7285	EMD SD40-2	Purchased by D and I Railroad	ex-Burlington Northern
OMLX 5625	EMD GP20MQ	Transferred to Alabama & Tennessee River RR	Former Demonstrator, ex-SP, 645 prime mover
HLCX 3839	EMD GP38-2	Returned	Off Lease
ILSX 1390	EMD GP39-2	Off property	
NREX 3333	EMD GP50	Sent to Chicago Rail Link	ex-Chicago & Northwestern 5075
GATX 2657	EMD GP38-2	Off lease	ex-Conrail, rebuilt EMD GP38
HLCX 1027	EMD GP38-2	Off lease	Rebuilt EMD GP40
OMLX 9259	EMD SD45T-2	Transferred to NKCR	Née-SP, ex-LTEX
NKCR 2	EMD GP7	Operated by ADM of Ottawa	Lease Expired
NKCR 3	CF-7	Scrapped	Lease Expired
LLPX 1513	EMD GP15-1	Off Property	Lease Expired
CSP 1	GE B23-7	Sold, Scrapped.	
CSP 2	GE B23-7	Sold, Scrapped.	
CSP 3	GE B23-7	Sold, Scrapped.	
CSP 4	GE B23-7	Sold, Scrapped	May have been saved.
IR 5	CF-7	Scrapped	
IR 6	GE B23-7	Sold, Scrapped.	
IR 7	GE B23-7	Sold, Scrapped.	
GMTX 9041	EMD SD60	Sold to Providence & Worcester. Renumbered GMTX 9000.	Ex: EMDX 3. Only SD60 with Radial Trucks.
GATX 2604	EMD GP38-2	Returned	
IR 7444	EMD SD45R	Sold to Motive Power Resources, Unknown disp.	ex-Southern Pacific
IR 9238	EMD SD45T-2	Sold to Motive Power Resources, Unknown disp.	ex-Southern Pacific
OMLX 1472	EMD SW14	Off Property	Rebuilt Illinois Central SW9
OMLX 2551	EMD GP38-2	Sent to Decatur Central Railroad	Rebuilt Union Pacific EMD GP40, Now owned by Omnitrax
OMLX 1000	EMD GP38-3	Sent to Chicago Rail Link	Rebuilt Union Pacific EMD GP40, Now owned by Omnitrax
OMLX 1003	EMD GP38-3	Sent to Decatur Central Railroad	Rebuilt Union Pacific EMD GP40, Leased from Helm Leasing Company
