= Atlanta and Birmingham Air Line Railway =

Overview
- Locale: Georgia; Alabama
- Dates of operation: 1902–1909
- Predecessor: East and West Railroad of Alabama
- Successor: Seaboard Air Line Railroad

Technical
- Length: 162.6 miles (261.7 km)

The Atlanta and Birmingham Air Line Railway (A&BAL) was a railroad line running from Atlanta, Georgia to Birmingham, Alabama. It eventually came under the ownership of the Seaboard Air Line Railroad.

== History ==
The Atlanta and Birmingham Air Line Railway was formed when the Seaboard Air Line Railroad (SAL) purchased the capital stock of the bankrupt East and West Railroad of Alabama (E&W) on April 23, 1902. The E&W Railroad had already established a line from Cartersville, Georgia, to Pell City, Alabama, through the cities of Rockmart, Georgia, Cedartown, Georgia, and Piedmont, Alabama.

The SAL then merged the E&W into a new subsidiary called the Atlanta and Birmingham Air Line Railway. With this new subsidiary, a 37-mile extension was built from Coal City, Alabama (renamed to Wattsville in 1917) to Birmingham, AL. In addition, a 43-mile connection from Howells, Georgia (located in Northwest Atlanta) was constructed to meet the former E&W at Rockmart.

Some of the sights on the line include the Pumpkinvine Creek Trestle located in Paulding County, Georgia, which was built in 1901 by the E&W and is 126 feet high and 750 feet long. Because of the mountainous terrain in Alabama, 3 tunnels were constructed on this line. At the time, SAL had no tunnels anywhere on their entire system. The tunnels constructed were the Divide Tunnel (now called Bushy Mountain Tunnel) located near Braswell, Georgia, the Hardwick Tunnel located between Odenville and Wattsville, Alabama, and the Roper Tunnel located near Trussville, Alabama. The 3 tunnels totaled 2,964 ft. in length. Currently, the Hardwick and Roper tunnels are being used by the Alabama and Tennessee River Railway, a subsidiary railroad of OmniTRAX.

In 1904 the A&BAL reached Birmingham where it interchanged with the Louisville & Nashville Railroad (L&N), the St. Louis–San Francisco Railway (Frisco) and the Illinois Central Railroad (IC). The A&BAL also reached Howells (located in Northwest Atlanta), which became the location of the Seaboard Georgia Division offices, and a switching yard and Locomotive servicing and repair shop. After the A&BAL opened in late 1904, the 22-mile Rockmart-Cartersville link and the Coal City-Pell City tracks became branches off the main line. The line officially opened for freight traffic on December 5, 1904, and passenger service July 2, 1905.

Birmingham Subdivision

Overview
- Status: Some segments still operating
- Owner: Seaboard Air Line Railroad
- Termini: Atlanta, Georgia; Birmingham, Alabama

Technical
- Line length: 162.6 mi (261.7 km)
- Electrification: No

The Seaboard Air Line fully absorbed the A&BAL in 1909. Once the Seaboard gained full control of the line, they designated the line from Atlanta to Birmingham as the Birmingham Subdivision. Track from Rockmart to Cartersville was designated as the Cartersville Subdivision. All tunnels on the line were eventually concrete-lined, starting in 1909. The rebuilding of the original E&W line in 1909 also included straightening of curves on the existing trackage which required deep cuts through granite rock, resulting in the removal of over 6 miles of circuitous trackage.

The Silver Comet, The Cherry Blossoms, and The Capitol were Seaboard passenger trains that ran the line daily from Atlanta to Birmingham.

In 1967, the Seaboard Air Line merged with its rival, the Atlantic Coast Line Railroad (ACL). The merged company was named the Seaboard Coast Line Railroad (SCL). In 1980, the Seaboard Coast Line's parent company merged with the Chessie System, creating the CSX Corporation. The CSX Corporation initially operated the Chessie and Seaboard Systems separately until 1986, when they were merged into CSX Transportation.

The original SAL Birmingham Subdivision was eventually abandoned in 1988 by CSX from Cedartown to Wellington and from Rockmart to Smyrna, Georgia (near Atlanta).

== Current conditions ==
=== Cartersville Subdivision ===
The line is still in service from Rockmart, Georgia to Cedartown, Georgia along with the former SAL Cartersville Subdivision. This segment is still owned and operated by CSX and the full length of this segment from Cartersville to Cedartown via Rockmart is now known as the Cartersville Subdivision.

=== West of Cedartown ===
The former right of way from Cedartown to Maxwellborn has been redeveloped into a rail trail. It is now part of the Silver Comet Trail in Georgia as well as the Chief Ladiga Trail in Alabama.

The remaining line from Wellington to Birmingham was leased by CSX to the Alabama and Tennessee River Railway, a short line operated by OmniTRAX in 2004.

== Historic stations ==
Birmingham Subdivision
State	Milepost	City/Location	Station	Connections and notes
GA		Atlanta	Terminal Station	
GA	SG 574.8	Atlanta	Howell Yard	junction with Seaboard Air Line Railroad Atlanta Subdivision
GA	SG 575.6	Atlanta	W&A Junction	junction with Nashville, Chattanooga and St. Louis Railway
GA	SG 580.1		Edna	
GA	SG 586.3		Floyd	
GA	SG 592.0	Powder Springs	Powder Springs	
GA	SG 602.3	Dallas	Dallas	
GA	SG 608.4		Hanlin	
GA	SG 612.9		Divide	
GA	SG 618.5	Rockmart	Rockmart	junction with Cartersville Subdivision
GA	SG 623.7		Fish	
GA	SG 631.3	Cedartown	Cedartown	junction with Chattanooga, Rome and Columbus Railroad (CoG/SOU)
GA	SG 632.7	Cedartown	E&W Siding	
GA	SG 640.8		Esom	
AL	SG 644.4		Palestine	
AL	SG 655.2	Piedmont	Piedmont	
AL	SG 662.7		Maxwellborn	junction with Alabama and Tennessee River Railroad (ETV&G/SOU)
AL	SG 667.6		Anderson	
AL	SG 673.4	Wellington	Wellington	junction with Alabama Mineral Railroad (L&N)
AL	SG 680.5	Ohatchee	Ohatchee	
AL	SG 690.6	Ragland	Ragland	
AL	SG 699.5		Wattsville	originally Coal City
AL	SG 708.8	Odenville	Odenville	
AL	SG 714.2		Sanie	
AL	SG 717.7		Parsons	
AL	SG 722.3		Roper	
AL	SG 731.4	Irondale	Irondale	
AL	SG 736.6	Birmingham	Birmingham Yard	junction with
AL	SG 737.4	Birmingham	Birmingham Terminal Station	junction with: Louisville & Nashville Railroad; St. Louis–San Francisco Railway; Illinois Central Railroad; Atlanta, Birmingham and Coast Railroad (ACL)

Cartersville Subdivision
Milepost	City/Location	Station	Connections and notes
SGC 618.5	Rockmart	Rockmart	junction with Birmingham Subdivision
SGC 622.5	Aragon	Aragon	
SGC 627.4	Taylorsville	Taylorsville	
SGC 641.2	Cartersville	Cartersville	junction with Nashville, Chattanooga and St. Louis Railway
