= PNR (disambiguation) =

A passenger name record is the detail of a passenger's travel held by an airline or transport operator.

PNR may also refer to:

== Government ==
- Regional nature parks of France (French: parc naturel régional), a statutory conservation designation
- Policía Nacional Revolucionaria, Cuba's national police force

== Political parties ==
- Partido Nacional Renovador, Portugal (so named 2000–2020)
- Partidul Național Român, an ethnic Romanian party of Austria–Hungary (1881–1918) and Romania (1919–1926)
- Partidul Național Român (Moldova) (so named 2000–2013; now New Historical Option)
- Partidul Neamului Românesc or Romanian Nationhood Party (founded 2019)
- Partido Nacional Revolucionario, Mexico (so named 1929–1938; now Partido Revolucionario Institucional)

== Transport ==
- Panhandle Northern Railroad, reporting mark PNR
- Penrith railway station, Cumbria, England (by GBR station code)
- Philippine National Railways, Philippines
- Pioneer MRT station, west Singapore (by MRT station code)
- Pointe Noire Airport, Congo (by IATA code)

== Other uses ==
- Paranormal romance, a subgenre of fiction depicting romantic relationships with supernatural creatures
- Paul North Rice, American librarian
- Photoreceptor cell-specific nuclear receptor
- Point of no return, an idiomatic expression
- Pick and roll, a common offensive action in basketball
