= Sand Springs Railway =

Class III railroad operating in Oklahoma

- Sand Springs Interurban Railway
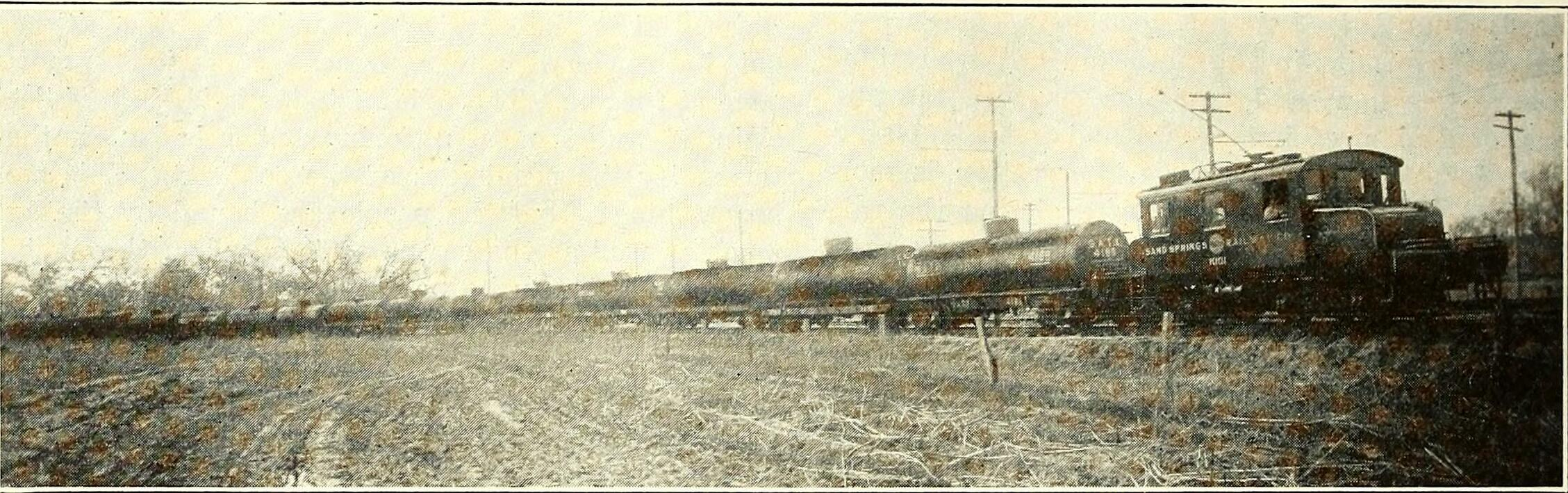
- A Sand Springs Railway freight train in 1919

Overview
- Parent company: OmniTRAX
- Reporting mark: SS
- Dates of operation: 1911–

Technical
- Track gauge: 4 ft 8 1/2 in (1,435 mm) standard gauge
- Electrification: 1912-1955
- Length: 32 miles (51 km)

Other
- Website: Official website

The Sand Springs Railway (reporting mark SS; originally the Sand Springs Interurban Railway) is a class III railroad operating in Oklahoma. It was formed in 1911 by industrialist Charles Page to connect his newly formed city of Sand Springs to Tulsa, operating both as a passenger-carrying interurban and a freight carrier. At Sand Springs, the company also served his children's home, and Page directed all railroad profits to support the home's operations.

Passenger service was discontinued January 2, 1955, but the railroad has continued to operate to the present. Following a federal requirement to divest the railroad, in 1987 HMK Inc became the company's new owner, via subsidiary Sheffield Steel, operator of a steel plant served by the railroad. Gerdau Ameristeel Corporation took over the company in 2006. Gerdau sold the railway to shortline railroad holding company OmniTRAX on July 1, 2014, having previously shut down its steel plant in 2009.

== History ==
=== Formation and construction ===
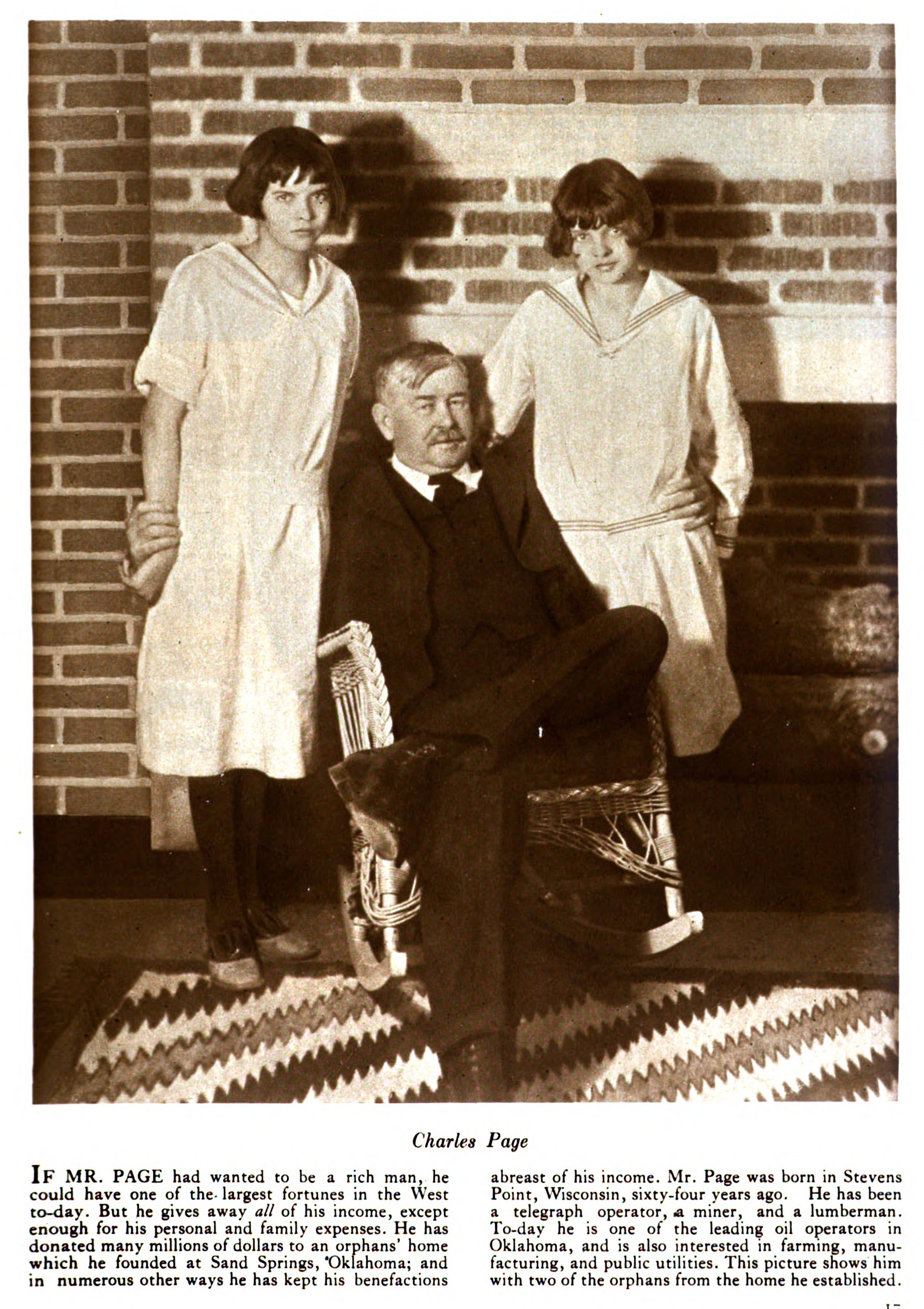
Charles Page, seen with two orphans at his children's home, was the founder of the Sand Springs Railway

The Sand Springs Interurban Railway was incorporated on February 6, 1911 by Charles Page, a wealthy industrialist. Page had previously started a home for needy children at Sand Springs, Oklahoma, in 1908, and the railroad served both the home and the "model city" he planned to build. Page additionally offered incentives for factories to build in Sand Springs, including $200,000 and free supplies of gas. From the beginning, the railroad was officially designated as a funding source for the Sand Springs Home, and was to terminate at an amusement park in Sand Springs also to be built by Page.

Construction of the line, which was to connect Sand Springs to Tulsa, began in earnest on February 20, 1911. The route roughly followed the Arkansas River, and was described as "mostly level". In February, it was reported that two bridges were to be built along the route, including "one 30-foot steel bridge and one 120-foot trestle". By March, this had changed to a 20 foot long bridge, and two shorter trestles of 30 feet in length each. Contracts for the grading of the line were issued by March, reported to require the movement of 7,000 cubic yards of earth per mile.

A local newspaper reported that "the equipment to be used on the road is to be... the best and most expensive obtainable". In addition to two "elegantly equipped" gas powered interurban cars from the McKeen Motor Car Company, the company also purchased a steam locomotive to haul freight traffic. Significant portions of the line were completed by early April, with the remaining obstacles being securing a route into downtown Tulsa, and delays in the arrival of sufficient spikes to install the remaining rails. Following trains which were run for the press and Tulsa officials on May 11, the Sand Springs Railroad officially opened to passenger traffic on May 14, 1911. The company later claimed that "when the railway was first established, only 40 people lived along the entire length of the line".

=== Interurban operations (1911–1955) ===
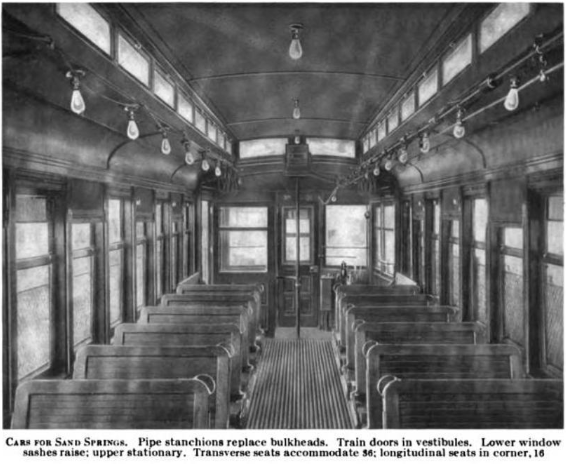
The interior of one of the gas-powered interurban cars

The opening of the railroad played a role in attracting residents and businesses to Sand Springs. "The best equipped interurban in the southwest" was one of the benefits touted in advertising for the city. By September 1911, passenger business was reportedly so strong that the line's regularly scheduled service could not meet demand. As a result, service frequencies were increased, with the company's steam locomotive and passenger cars used to supplement the two interurban cars.

In addition to robust passenger business, the Sand Springs Railway advertised its freight business, offering connections to four other railroads in downtown Tulsa. A number of industries had already opened or begun building factories in Sand Springs, including manufacturers of oil well supplies, glass, and cotton goods. The company also served a waterworks facility on the western outskirts of Tulsa, connecting it to the St. Louis–San Francisco Railway (known as the Frisco) in downtown. Besides the Frisco, the Sand Springs Railway also connected to the Atchison, Topeka and Santa Fe Railway (the Santa Fe), the Midland Valley Railroad, and the Missouri–Kansas–Texas Railroad (known by its initials MKT or as the "Katy").

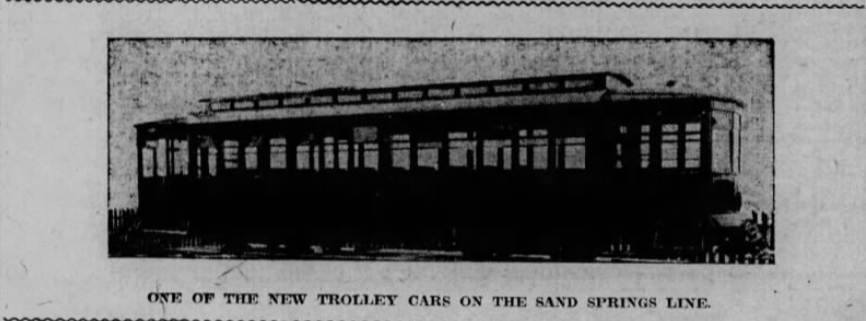
One of the company's trolley cars in 1912

Electrification of the line rapidly progressed in 1912, with the railroad ordering seven electric cars to supplement the two McKeen gasoline cars, which were to be retained as well. A new power plant was constructed to power the railroad, as well as the city of Sand Springs. The company formally changed its name to drop the word "interurban" from its name in April 1912. It maintained corporate headquarters at the First National Bank Building in Tulsa, with a repair shop located in Sand Springs.

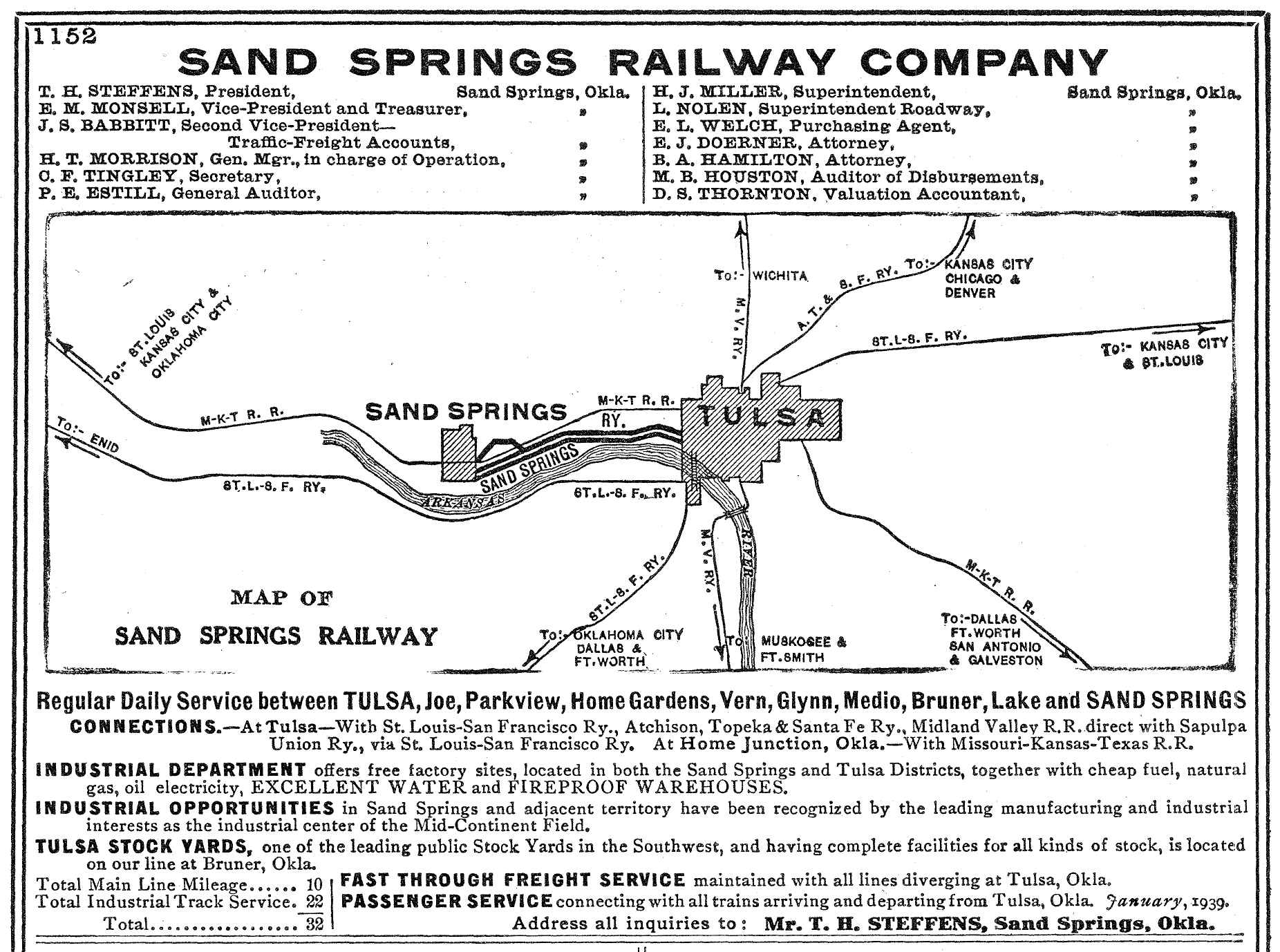
A 1939 map of the Sand Springs Railway

The city of Tulsa voted overwhelmingly to grant the Sand Springs Railway authority to construct a route within the city on May 29, 1911, securing it access to downtown. At the time, trains were running from a temporary terminal at Third Street. With the extension granted, the new terminus was to be located at the intersection of Main and Archer Streets, with the Brady Hotel to be used as a waiting room for passengers. The Sand Springs Railway planned to complete the extension within three weeks.

Within a few years of electrification, the two McKeen gas cars were sold to two other lines in Texas and Oklahoma, as the units were found to be inadequate for the Sand Springs Railway's needs. In March 1914, the Sand Springs Railway purchased a unique 50 ton, 400 horsepower Baldwin-Westinghouse electric locomotive to handle increasing freight traffic. A double-tracking project was launched in 1916 to increase the line's capacity between Sand Springs and Tulsa. The Sand Springs Railway began hauling mail traffic between the two cities on June 1, 1916. Mail service initially made one round trip per day, later increased to three round trips daily. The company's offices were relocated to a new building in Sand Springs in 1920.

By 1940, the Sand Springs Railway handled a total of more than 1 million passengers each year, along with approximately 11,000 freight cars. The company counted 125 employees, and served 85 different customers along its line. In 1940, the fare for a trip between Sand Springs and Tulsa was ten cents, and five cents for shorter trips, unchanged from the fares charged when the company started operations in 1911. Fares were further discounted by half for many groups, including schoolchildren and scouts, while first responders and mail carriers were granted free fares. Interurban service ran day and night, with so-called "owl cars" running after dark. Every day, 136 passenger trips were scheduled to operate, on a rush hour frequency of every ten minutes, with service every 20 minutes at all other times.

=== Freight-only operations (1955–1987) ===
In September 1954, the company announced it was discontinuing its interurban service, selling the rights to a bus company and ending its passenger runs as soon as sufficient bus equipment arrived. When the final passenger train ran on January 2, 1955, it was the last interurban operated in Oklahoma. Writing in 1961, a local newspaper opined that the "line might still be running today if the company could have secured a more direct entry into downtown Tulsa". Freight business remained busy on the Sand Springs Railway, despite the end of passenger operations. Dieselization took place around the same time as electric operations ended, with the company replacing steam power with three new EMD SW900s in 1956.

Traffic continued to be strong in the 1970s, with the company identified as one of the most profitable railroads in the United States. All profit from the company was used to support the children's home built by Page, which fully owned the railroad company. In 1975, the Sand Springs Railway counted over 70 customers along its line, and also benefitted from an exclusive franchise originally established by Page. The railroad's president also cited the dedication of its employees, which while being fully unionized had never gone on strike, to supporting the children's home.

The Sand Springs Home was required to sell the Sand Springs Railway in December 1986, citing federal tax laws.

=== Steel mill ownership (1987–2014) ===
The railroad was acquired by HMK Incorporated in 1987. The Sand Springs Railway joined nine other railroads operating in Oklahoma in a lawsuit against the State of Oklahoma and Governor Henry Bellmon in 1989, alleging that the state was unfairly taxing railroad companies. Railroad operations were temporarily halted on April 18, 1991, by a nationwide railroad strike, with the majority of the company's workforce (21 employees, of which 18 were union members) joining the strike. The company's manager told The Daily Oklahoman "We won't operate until they go back to work". The strike was forced by the federal government to end within 24 hours of it starting.

In 1993, the railroad was bought by Sheffield Steel, which operated a melt shop and rolling mill in the city of Sand Springs, later declaring bankruptcy. The railroad was then bought by a subsidiary of Gerdau Ameristeel Corporation in 2006. The steel mill was shuttered by Gerdau in 2009, but rail operations continued for other customers.

=== OmniTRAX (2014–present) ===
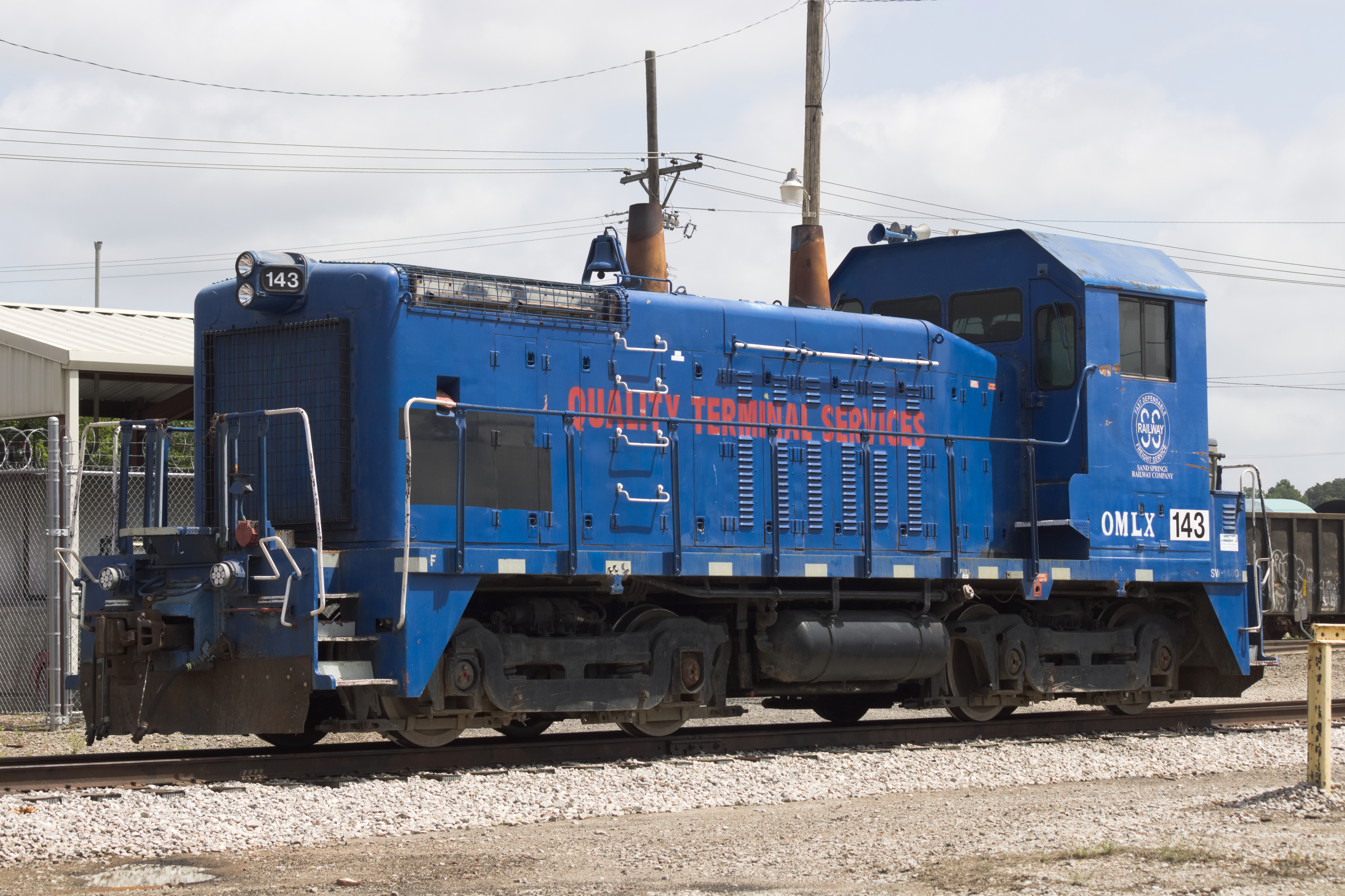
OMLX 143, an EMD SW14, operating on the Sand Springs Railway in June 2026

Shortline railroad holding company OmniTRAX purchased the Sand Springs Railway in June 2014, with OmniTRAX's CEO citing the diverse mix of industry in the Tulsa area as a reason for the purchase. OmniTRAX began operations on July 1, 2014, marking the first time in several decades the railroad was run by a railroad company, rather than a steel mill. Since 2021, the Sand Springs Railway operates 32 miles (51 km) of track. The company is classified as a class III railroad by the Surface Transportation Board. As of 2024, the SW900 locomotives have been sold, and the railroad operates at least one EMD SW14 locomotive known as OMLX 143.

== Preservation ==
Sand Springs 68, an interurban car built by the Cincinnati Car Company, operated on the Sand Springs Railway from 1932 until the end of passenger operations in 1955. The car was rescued from a Tulsa area scrapyard by Illinois Railway Museum volunteers and taken to that museum in 1967 on a flatcar. Initially only the shell of the car remained, but following a 40-year-long restoration effort by museum volunteer Bob Kutella, Sand Springs 68 operated under its own power in 2004 and has operated at the museum since.
