= Chicago and Illinois Western Railroad =

Overview
- Headquarters: Chicago, Illinois, USA
- Reporting mark: CIW
- Dates of operation: 1903–1984
- Successor: Illinois Central Gulf Railroad

Technical
- Track gauge: 4 ft 8 1/2 in (1,435 mm) standard gauge
- Length: 12.027 miles (19.36 km) (1929)
- Track length: 16.839 miles (27.10 km)

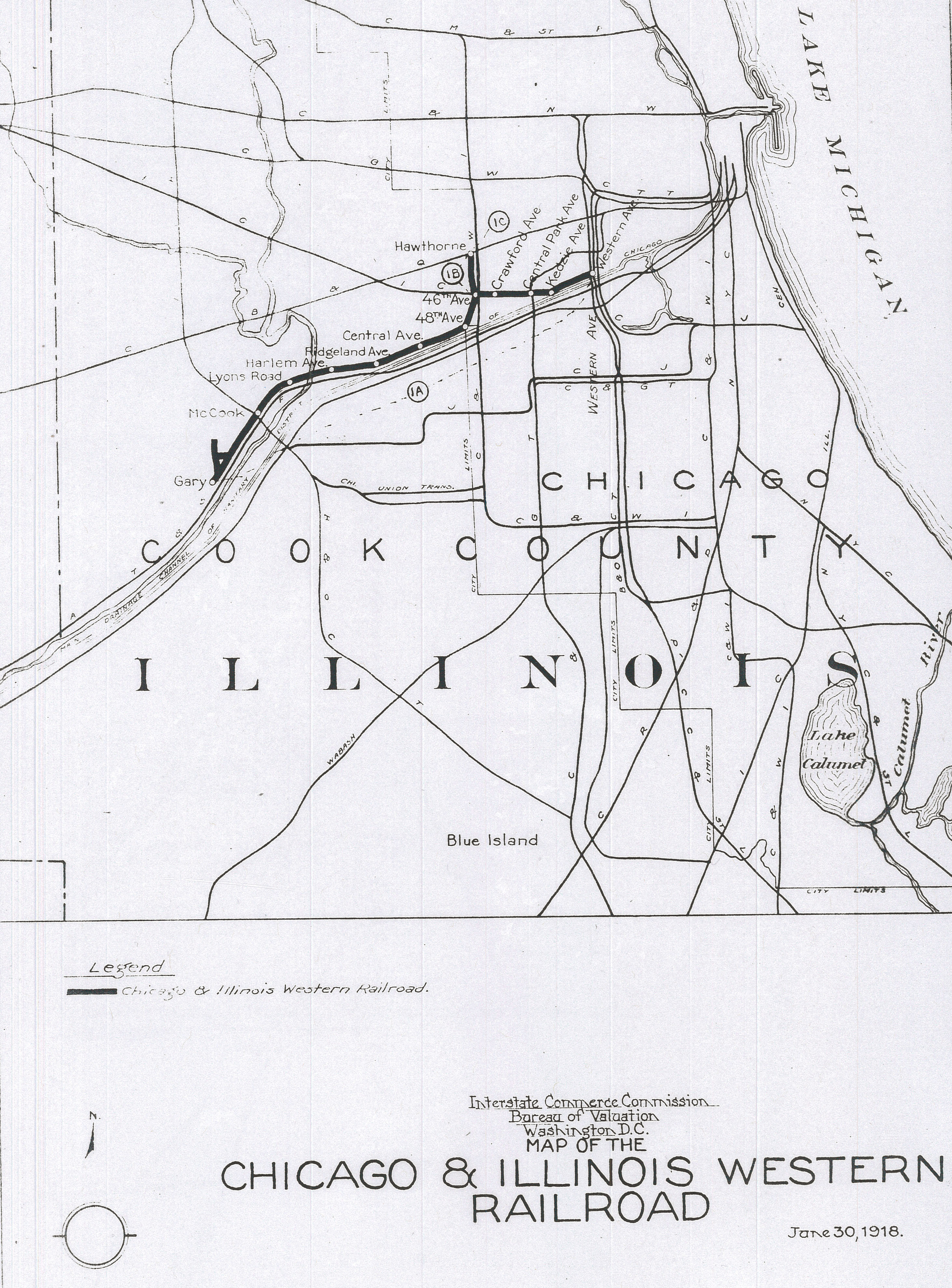
1918 map of the railroad

The Chicago and Illinois Western Railroad (reporting mark CIW) was an industrial switching railroad serving the west side of Chicago and southwest Cook County. From a connection with a now defunct north–south railroad line near 31st Blvd. and Western Ave. it went west along 33rd St. to Cicero. Just before Cicero Ave. (Ill. 50) it turned south and roughly paralleled Cicero Ave. to the Chicago Sanitary and Ship Canal. At the canal it turned west and paralleled the canal and then the Des Plaines River to Hodgkins. Incorporated in 1903, it was merged into the Illinois Central Gulf Railroad in 1984. In 2020 a short segment is used by the Canadian National Railway and the Cicero Central Railroad.

== History ==
The Chicago and Illinois Western Railroad (C&IW) was incorporated February 26, 1903, by Dolese and Shepard, a limestone mining company. They had a quarry in "Hawthorne" (Cicero) and wanted to connect with their larger quarry near "Gary", Illinois (a railroad station in Hodgkins). This section was completed in 1907.

In 1906 the railroad began negotiating with the Chicago City Council (the Hawthorne-Gary segment was outside of the city) for a line that would go east along 33rd street to a connection with a north–south line near 31st Blvd. and Western Ave. An ordinance was passed in 1907 but construction was slow. The line was completed in 1914.

There were also plans to go further southwest to Joliet and tracks were laid as far as Willow Springs, but they had been cut back to Hodgkins by 1918.

In 1924 utilities investor Samuel Insull began building the large Commonwealth Edison and Peoples Gas Light and Coke Crawford coal generating plants at Pulaski Ave. along the south side of the railroad. In 1925 the two utilities bought the railroad to supply coal to the plants. At that time the Illinois Central began operating the railroad.

In 1967 the Interstate Commerce Commission approved the sale of the railroad to the Illinois Central. They operated it as a separate line until April 30, 1983, when it was merged into the (renamed) Illinois Central Gulf Railroad.

== Trackage ==
By 1918 all track was in place with the exception of that between Hodgkins and Willow Springs, which had been removed. At that time the railroad owned 12.027 miles (19.36 km) of track, leased 4.758 miles (7.66 km), and had trackage rights on 9.95 miles (16.01 km). The general route was from Western Ave. in Chicago west along 35th St. to Cicero., south along Cicero Ave. to the Sanitary Canal, and then west along the canal through Stickney Township to Harlem Ave. There it crossed the Des Plaines River and went southwest parallel to it through Lyons and McCook to Hodgkins.

The railroad's engine servicing and main yard were in Dolese and Shepard's Hawthorne Quarry, on the east side of Cicero Ave. from 30th St. to 33rd St. The area was bounded by Western Electric's lumber and pole yard on the North, the Belt Railway of Chicago on the East, the Illinois Central Railroad (now CN Railway) on the South, and Cicero Ave. on the west.

The eastern end of the tracks was a connection with the now defunct Pittsburgh, Cincinnati, Chicago and St. Louis Railroad (the "Panhandle Line", part of the Pennsylvania Railroad system), from the southbound Panhandle it split west, crossing 31st Bvld. on a curving bridge, and then followed the Sanitary Canal. Just east of Damen Ave. they crossed the "Collateral Channel" (now a slip) on an unusual Rall bascule lift bridge.

West of Damen Ave. the Illinois Central crossed over to the north side of the Sanitary Canal and ran west just south of 33rd St. The C&IW crossed it and ran along its south side, switching heavy industry on the south side of the tracks.

At Central Park Ave. there was an interchange with the north–south Illinois Northern Railroad.

In 1925 Pulaski Road was named Crawford Ave. Commonwealth Edison built a large coal generating plane east of Pulaski Rd., Peoples Gas Light and Coke (under common ownership) had one on the west side, and the C&IW had a large yard west of Pulaski, switching coal to the plants. All three were named Crawford Ave. even after the 1952 name change.

The Belt Railway was the Chicago city limits, after the Illinois Railroad and Warehouse Commission gave approval to a crossing with the Belt Railway in 1913 the eastern part of the line could open in 1914. When the line crossed the Belt Railway it curved south through an industrial area between the Belt Railroad and Cicero Ave. down to the sanitary canal. There the tracks turned southwest.

In 1930 the Sanitary District of Chicago (now Metropolitan Water Reclamation District of Greater Chicago) opened its Stickney plant. The sanitary district has its own railroad which the C&IW used for short distances switching outside traffic to the district, but the two railroads don't interchange cars.

At about Oak Park Ave. the Atchison, Topeka and Santa Fe Railway (now BNSF Railway) crossed over to the north side of the Sanitary Canal and went west. Just west of Harlem Ave. it crossed the Des Plaines River and generally followed along the north side of the river through Hodgkins and on to Joliet. The C&IW ran along the north side of the Santa Fe southwest to Hodgkins, where it entered the Santa Fe's yard and ended.

Just east of today's 1st Ave. (Ill. 171) the tracks turned farther south and continued into the C&IW McCook yard. At the west end of the yard they crossed the north–south Indiana Harbor Belt Railroad and ran along the south side of the Dolese and Shepard (now Vulcan Materials Company) and other quarries to the Santa Fe yard at Hodgkins.

The C&IW had one branch line from the north–south section along Cicero Ave. Northbound traffic could, instead of curving to the east and crossing the Belt Railway at 33rd St., continue north, cross the Illinois Central, and run through the Hawthorne quarry to the Chicago, Burlington and Quincy Railroad (now BNSF Railway) and a connection with the Manufacturers' Junction Railway north of there.

== Equipment ==
In 1913 the C&IW owned three steam locomotives, in 1918 they owned four, including [0-4-0] switcher #701. They then owned 2-6-0 #201 and 0-6-0 #601. In 1926 they bought two Baldwin 0-8-0s, #801 and #802. In 1929 they bought two Lima 0-8-0s, #803 and #804.

In 1936 the C&IW bought a very early diesel switcher, Alco HH600 #1.

In 1950 they dieselized with three EMD SW7 and one EMD SW9 switcher locomotives, #101, #102, #103, and #104.

In 1913 the C&IW owned five hundred and thirteen cars total, five hundred and four gondolas, three box cars, three flat cars, and three cabooses. In 1918 they had 50 fewer revenue cars.
