= Manufacturers' Junction Railway =

American shortline railroad in Illinois

Overview
- Parent company: Western Electric (1903); Chicago West Pullman Transportation (1986); OmniTRAX (1992)
- Headquarters: Cicero, Illinois, USA
- Reporting mark: MJ
- Dates of operation: 1903–

Technical
- Track gauge: 4 ft 8 1/2 in (1,435 mm) standard gauge
- Track length: 21.68 miles (34.89 km) (1917); 5.5 miles (8.85 km) (1998)

The Manufacturers' Junction Railway (reporting mark MJ) is a shortline railroad in Cicero, Illinois. Originally a subsidiary of Western Electric used to switch their Hawthorne Works, after the plants were phased out it was sold to OmniTRAX, a company offering railroad management and other services.

== History ==
The railroad was founded on 28 January 1903, with the route opening in 1906, to switch Western Electric's Hawthorne Works. In 1917 it had a track length of 21.68 miles (34.89 km) in spite of it being less than 2 miles (3.22 km) long. In 1958 it was operating approximately 13 miles (20.92 km) of track.

In May 1986, after the Hawthorne Works were closed in 1983, the railroad was sold to the Chicago West Pullman Transportation Corp., a holding company who also owned a railroad on the south side of Chicago.

In 1992, OmniTRAX bought the railroad and a large part of the Hawthorne Works property, intending to make a business center with rail access. In 1998, the railroad was 1.78 miles (2.86 km) long with 5.5 miles (8.85 km) miles of track and served seven customers.

Changing demands reduced customers, in 2009 the railroad terminated their final employee. In 2017, the railway had not been formally dissolved and was still under US Surface Transportation Board jurisdiction but was out of service. In 2022, OmniTrax's site advertises owning and operating 6 miles (9.66 km) of track but only mentions "rail customer candidates".

== Trackage ==
The Manufacturers' Junction's primary interchange when built was with the Chicago, Burlington and Quincy Railroad (now BNSF Railway)'s Clyde (Cicero) yard. From the east end, near Cicero Ave. (Ill. 50), an eastbound track diverged to the left (north) and entered a yard with a five-stall roundhouse and servicing area between Cicero Ave. and the Chicago and Western Indiana (Belt Railway of Chicago) north-south line. The main line curved north from there and ran next to the Belt Railway to switch Western Electric's telephone apparatus building, merchandising building, foundry, and smaller plants between 24th St. and Cermak Rd. (22nd. St. in 1905). At Cermak Rd. the line continued north over a single-track bridge to switch customers on 46th Ct. between 16th and 19th St.

From the servicing area a line continued east under the Belt Railway (the Chicago city limits) and curved north to switch storage areas and the Western Electric cable plant on Cermak Rd.

From the main line near Cermak Rd. a branch reversed and went south on bridges and elevated track over Ogden Ave. (US 34), the BNSF Line, a connection between the BNSF and Belt Railway, and 26th. St. to switch the south lumber yard and connect with the Chicago and Illinois Western Railroad (now CN).

In 2022, the line is advertised as having six miles of track, from a connection with CSX Transportation north of 16th St. south to a connection with the Belt railway north of Cermak Rd., a connection with the BNSF at 26th St., and on to a connection with the CN Railway) at 33rd St., with all connections made through the Belt Railway. Most former Western Electric property in Cicero is now retail development but north of Cermak Rd. there is still a light manufacturing district. The Western Electric property in Chicago, east of the Belt Railway, is zoned or pending as light industry with potential rail service.

== Equipment ==
In 1917, the Manufacturers' Junction owned three steam locomotives, twenty-one boxcars, ten flatcars, and one caboose. In 1947, the railroad replaced four steam locomotives with two EMD SW1 locomotives: #6 (renumbered to 23), and #7 (renumbered to 33). #7 was originally EMD SW1 demonstrator #700. In 1996 both locomotives and 72 boxcars were in service. Approximately in 1998 and 1999, photos were taken of the locomotives #23, #33, and crane #91 inside the MJRY roundhouse and outside rails. All three railway equipment were repainted in Chicago Bulls colors to commemorate the third year in a row basketball championships. Each equipment numbering represented three basketball players: Michael Jordan #23, Scottie Pippen #33, and Dennis Rodman #91. After the railroad suspended operations the locomotives were heavily vandalized. As of 2016, the MJ roundhouse had been torn down and the engines had been scrapped.
