= Chicago Rail Link =

Switching railroad in Chicago, Illinois, US

Overview
- Current operator: OmniTRAX
- Headquarters: 2728 E 104th Street, Chicago, Illinois
- Reporting mark: CRL
- Locale: South Side of Chicago
- Dates of operation: 1980–present
- Predecessors: Rock Island; LaSalle & Bureau County Railway: 1892-1986

Technical
- Track gauge: 4 ft 8 1/2 in (1,435 mm) standard gauge
- Length: 72 miles (116 km)

Other
- Website: OmniTRAX: CRL

The Chicago Rail Link (reporting mark CRL) is a shortline switching railroad in Illinois. It owns and operates more than 72 miles of track on the South Side of Chicago. It is owned by OmniTRAX.

== History ==
The Chicago Rail Link was essentially organized 29 August 1980 after the Chicago, Rock Island and Pacific railroad abandoned track when it went defunct. It was originally called the LaSalle & Bureau County Railway and owned former CRI&P track between LaSalle and Midway, Illinois. This track was abandoned in the Link's early years and is now owned by the Iowa Interstate Railroad. The Chicago Rail Link merged with Chicago, West Pullman & Southern railroad on August 15, 1996.

In late 2018, Senators Dick Durbin and Tammy Duckworth announced that the Chicago Rail Link will receive $1.6 million in funding from the United States Department of Transportation to implement positive train control.

The Chicago Rail Link was the contract switching operator for Union Pacific and CSX's intermodal facilities in Chicago as of 2010, but it is unclear whether this contract is still effective. The CRL serves the Port of Chicago, as well as being the current switching operator over Metra trackage to their Blue Island yard on the Rock Island District.

== Trackage ==
The Chicago Rail Link's trackage stretches between Kensington, Irondale, Mokena, and Chicago, Illinois. The Chicago Rail Link has access to the BNSF Railway, the Canadian National Railway, the Canadian Pacific Railway, the CSX Transportation network, the Kansas City Southern Railway, the Norfolk Southern Railway, and the Union Pacific Railroad through the Belt Railway of Chicago. This is supplemented by trackage rights on the BRC for direct access. The Chicago Rail Link also provides access to the Iowa Interstate Railroad through Blue Island.

=== CRI&P Subdivision 1B ===
The majority of the Chicago Rail Link's trackage was CRI&P's Subdivision 1B, which was constructed in 1874. Automatic block signalling was installed in the 1910s; however, upon Chicago Rail Link ownership, the line was downgraded to be unsignaled and single-tracked. This subdivision was used by Baltimore & Ohio Railroad for passenger trains crossing the Rock Island main line at Gresham Junction. This junction is now where Metra Rock Island District splits.

There was a former extension of the line that went almost one half of a mile further, which intersected the main branch of the current day Metra Rock Island District.

== Industrial Site Development ==
The Chicago Rail Link owns two plots of land in the South Side of Chicago. It is a part of OmniTRAX's Rail-Ready Sites program. OmniTRAX is cooperating with the Calumet Area Industrial Commission to sell these plots of land. They are both served by the Chicago Rail Link.

== Equipment ==
Model	Road number
EMD GP7	4
EMD GP7	28
EMD GP7	29
EMD GP7	2066
EMD GP7	4297
EMD GP9	58
EMD GP9	59
EMD GP10	1042
EMD GP18	14
EMD GP18	15
EMD GP35	2
EMD SW8	43
EMD SW8	46
EMD SW9	51
EMD SW1200	52
EMD SW1500	18
EMD SW1500	19
