= Decatur Junction Railway =

Coordinates: 39°32′11.7″N 89°2′41.0″W

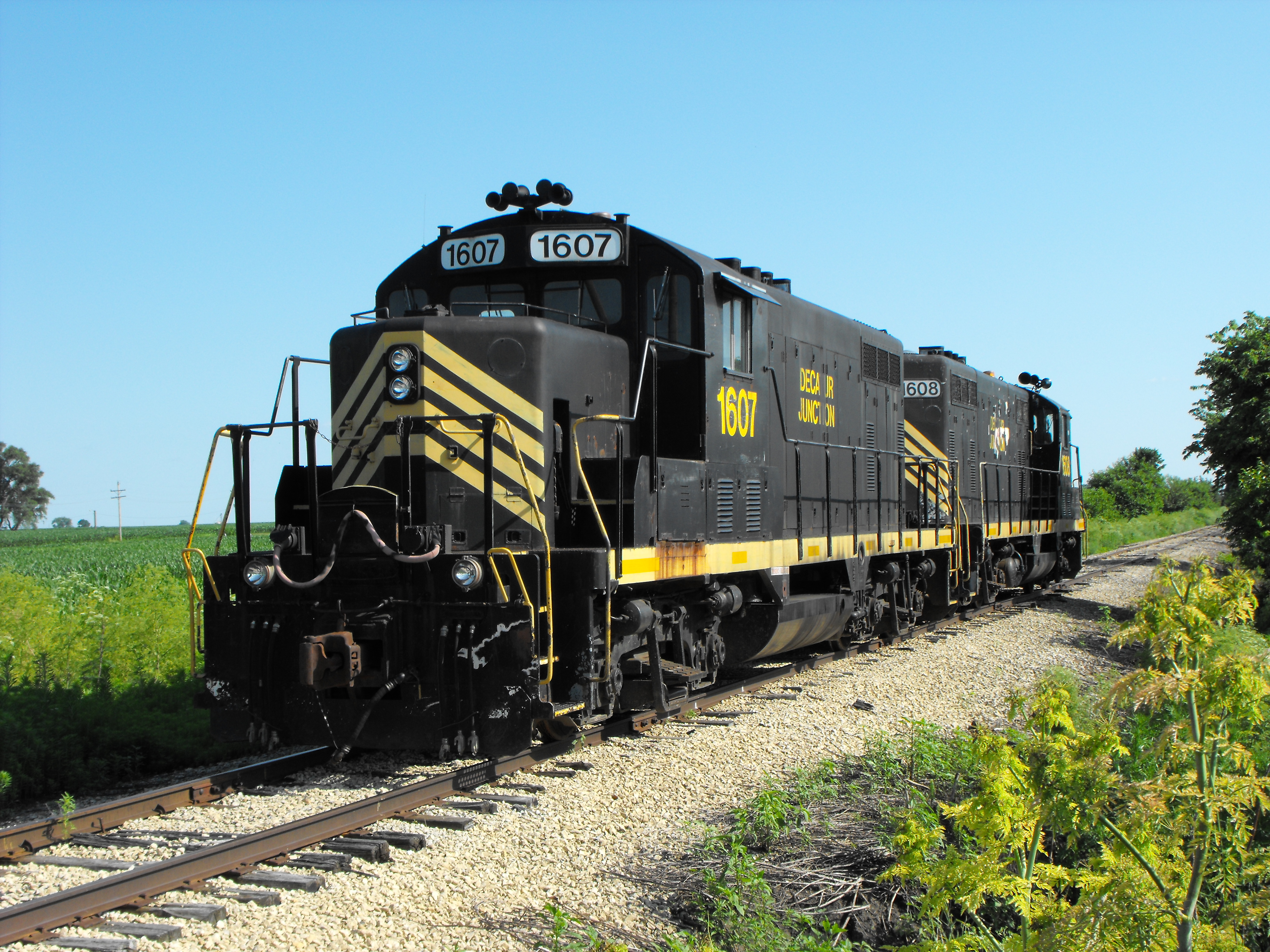
- Decatur Junction GP16 1607

Overview
- Headquarters: Assumption, Illinois, USA
- Reporting mark: DT
- Locale: Central Illinois
- Dates of operation: September 23, 1993–Present

Technical
- Track gauge: 4 ft 8 1/2 in (1,435 mm) (standard gauge)

The Decatur Junction Railway (reporting mark DT) is a Class III railroad which operates in the state of Illinois. It was one of several short-line railroads owned by Pioneer Railcorp. The latter was acquired by Patriot Rail Company in 2022.

On September 23, 1993, the Decatur Junction Railway Co. (DT) signed a lease agreement for the lease rights of two segments of track in east central Illinois from Assumption to Cisco owned by a consortium of grain dealers. The railroad's principal commodities are grain, fertilizer and plastics.

In January 2017, short-line operator OmniTrax, via subsidiary Decatur Central Railroad, took over operations of 16 miles (26 km) of track north of Decatur to Cisco that had previously been part of the Decatur Junction. The change in operators left the Decatur Junction with a 21-mile (34 km) line running from Elwin, near Decatur, south to Assumption.
