= Fulton County Railway =

Railway in Georgia, United States

The Fulton County Railway (reporting mark FCR) began operations in 2004, operating on about 25 miles of track owned by CSX Transportation in Georgia. It is owned by OmniTRAX.
