= Newburgh and South Shore Railroad =

Railroad in Cleveland, Ohio

The Newburgh & South Shore Railroad (reporting mark NSR) is a railroad that operates in Cleveland, Ohio, in the United States on 13 miles (21 km) of track. It opened in 1904 to service steel mills in the Cleveland area.

== History ==
The company was incorporated in 1899 as a subsidiary of the American Steel and Wire Company, a steel firm with several plants scattered throughout Cleveland. Construction began that year, and was complete in 1904. The line ran from the company's Central Furnaces (the area roughly bounded today by the Cuyahoga River, Interstate 490, and Broadway Avenue) and ran briefly south before crossing the Cuyahoga River at the now-demolished Jefferson Avenue Bridge. The track ran through the company's plant on the west side of the Cuyahoga, and recrossed the river near the now-demolished Clark Avenue Bridge. The line ran south (passing over Campbell Road and under Harvard Avenue) before turning east. After an at-grade crossing of E. 49th Street and the bridging of E. 71st Street, the tracks turned north at E. 76th Street into the company Newburgh Works, terminating at Aetna Road.

American Steel and Wire merged with a number of other steel companies to form U.S. Steel in 1901. U.S. Steel consolidated the NSR with another subsidiary railroad, the Bessemer & Lake Erie Railroad, in 1951. Traffic on the road declined significantly after World War II, and largely ceased when U.S. Steel closed its Cuyahoga Works in 1984. The NSR sold 2.2 miles (3.5 km) of its main line to the Cuyahoga Valley Railway, and then closed on June 30, 1986.

In July 1986, the track was sold to the Chicago West Pullman Transportation Co., now known as Omnitrax.
