= Northern Ohio and Western Railway =

Overview
- Headquarters: Tiffin, Ohio
- Reporting mark: NOW

Technical
- Track gauge: 4 ft 8 1/2 in (1,435 mm) standard gauge

Other

The Northern Ohio and Western Railway (reporting mark NOW) is a rail line owned by OmniTRAX located in Northwest Ohio. It is based in Tiffin, Ohio, and operates between Tiffin, located on CSX's Williard Subdivision, and Woodville.

It originally was a Pennsylvania Railroad (PRR) line that traveled from Toledo to Mansfield. Most of the line south of Tiffin has been abandoned except for a stretch that once reached a Republic grain elevator in Tiro. In 1959, the section of track from Carrothers to Mansfield was abandoned by PRR. In 1984, from Tiffin to Carrothers was abandoned by Conrail. As of 2011 only 21 miles of the line is owned by the NOW; the other half is owned by CSX Transportation.
