= Alliance Terminal Railroad =

The Alliance Terminal Railroad (reporting mark ATR) is a Class III terminal railroad in Haslet, Texas, responsible for the switching and operations of the Alliance Intermodal Facility. It is owned by OmniTRAX and subleases the terminal yard from Quality Terminal Services, also owned by OmniTRAX. It connects with the BNSF Railway at Haslet, and operates on approximately 24 miles (39 km) of BNSF's track through incidental trackage rights.
