= American Short Line and Regional Railroad Association =

North American trade group

The American Short Line and Regional Railroad Association (ASLRRA) is an association of North American short line and regional railroads based in Washington DC. Founded in 1913, the ASLRRA has a range of members, include a variety of Class II and Class III railroads. The association comprises approximately 1000 small businesses, all within the railway transportation industry. The ASLRRA acts as a lobbying group for member railroads, representing them for both legislation and regulation. They are often charged with conducting compliance assessments for their members. Since 1998, they have also been awarding the Jake Award - recognizing railroads for their safety record which had originally been started by L. S. “Jake” Jacobson.
