= Hawthorne Works =

1905–1983 factory complex in Cicero, Illinois, US

Coordinates: 41.850°N 87.740°W

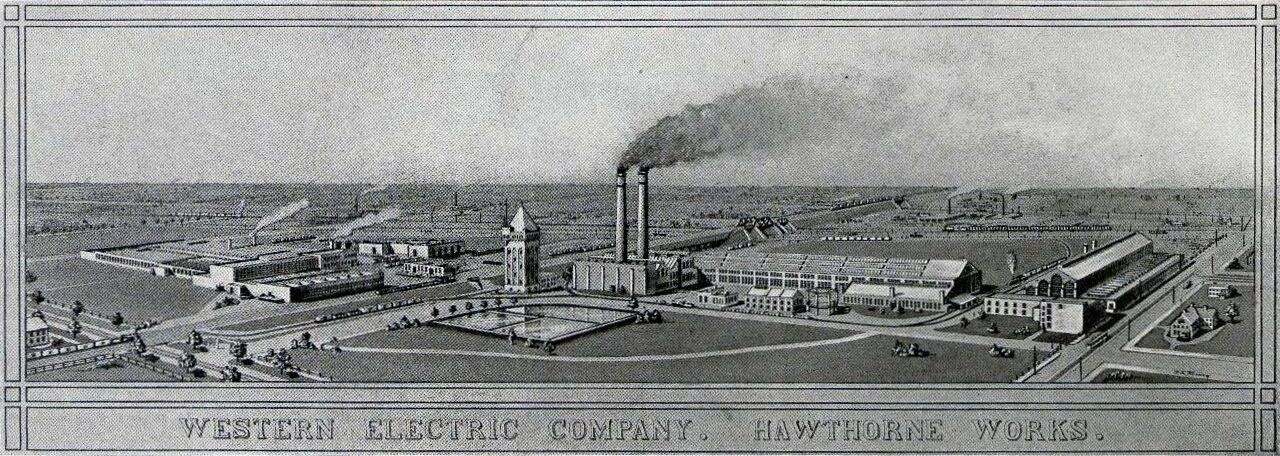
Aerial view of the Hawthorne Works, c. 1907

The Hawthorne Works was a large factory complex of the Western Electric Company in Cicero, Illinois. In addition to industrial plants, several on-site community amenities were provided to workers. Named for the original name of what became Cicero, Hawthorne, it opened in 1905 and operated until 1983. At its peak of operations, Hawthorne employed 45,000 workers, producing large quantities of telephone equipment, but also a wide variety of consumer products.

The facility is well-known for the studies in industrial relations held there in the 1920s, and the Hawthorne effect for a worker management behavior is named for the works.

== History ==
The Hawthorne Works complex was built at the intersection of Cicero Avenue and Cermak Road and was opened in 1905. Hawthorne Works was named for Hawthorne, Illinois, a small town that was later incorporated as Cicero. The facility consisted of several buildings and contained a private railroad, Manufacturers' Junction Railway, to move shipments through the plant to the nearby Chicago, Burlington and Quincy Railroad freight depot. In the first decades, the factory complex was significantly expanded.

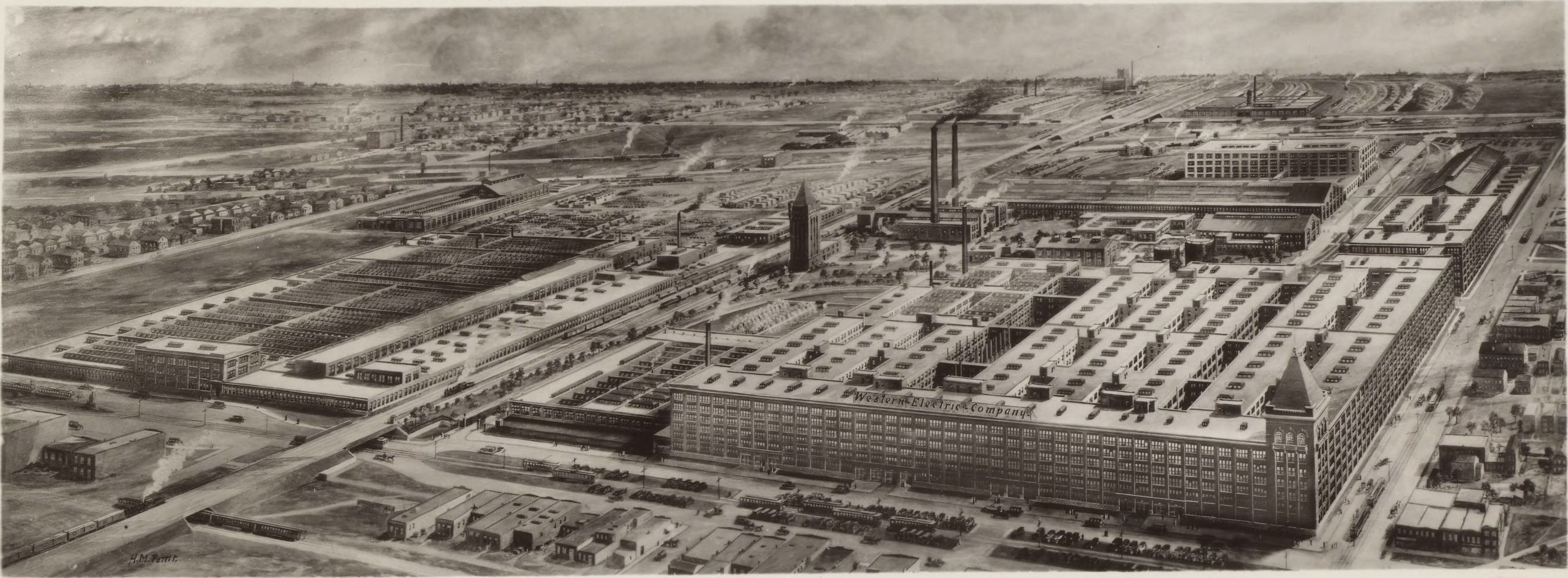
Aerial view of the Hawthorne Works, c. 1925. This image and the image above are created from the same angle.

The Hawthorne Works produced a large output of telephone equipment. In addition, Western Electric produced a wide variety of consumer products and electrical equipment, such as refrigerators. The works employed up to 45,000 employees at the height of operations. Workers regularly used bicycles for transit within the plant.

The Hawthorne Works was in operation until 1983, when it was closed as a result of the divestiture of AT&T and the breakup of the Bell System. It was purchased in the mid-1980s by the late Donald L. Shoemaker and replaced with a shopping center. One of the original towers remained at the corner of 22nd Street and Cicero Ave.

Due to its significance in industrial manufacturing in the United States, the Hawthorne Works was the site of well-known industrial studies. The Hawthorne effect is named for the works. North American Quality pioneer Joseph Juran referred to the Hawthorne Works as "the seed bed of the Quality Revolution". The career arcs of other notable quality professionals such as Walter Shewhart and W. Edwards Deming also intersected at the Hawthorne Works.

Paul Mattick, the Marxist theorist, worked here as a mechanic from 1928/29 until 1932.

220 employees of the Hawthorne works, many of them Czech immigrants, were among those killed in the capsizing of the SS Eastland in Chicago on July 24, 1915; they were preparing to depart on a company-sponsored excursion at the time.

=== Hawthorne effect ===
The term "Hawthorne effect" refers to the type of reactivity in which individuals modify an aspect of their behavior in response to their awareness of being observed. It was first observed in data from the Hawthorne Works collected by psychologist Elton Mayo and later reinterpreted by Henry A. Landsberger, who coined the term.

== Hawthorne Works Museum ==
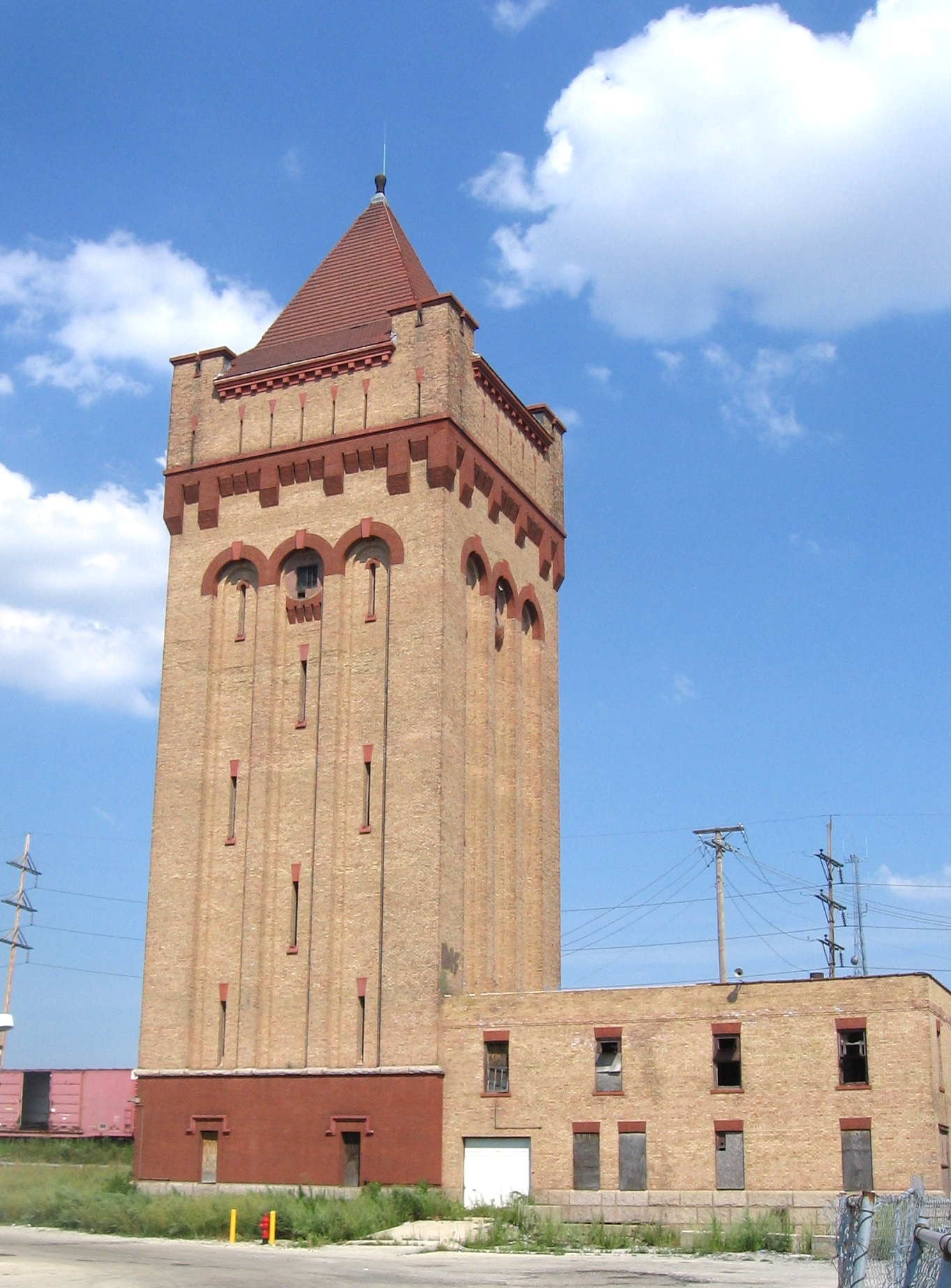
The last vestige of the Hawthorne Works. This tower can be seen in the center-left of the aerial view (above).

The Hawthorne Works Museum, operated by Morton College, tells the story of the Hawthorne Works facility, its products and its employees. Exhibits show Western Electric products, such as telephones, communications and electronics equipment, inventions by Bell Laboratories, local immigrant workers and local history.
