= Alabama and Tennessee River Railway =

Overview
- Headquarters: Gadsden, Alabama
- Reporting mark: ATN
- Locale: Birmingham, Alabama to Guntersville, Alabama
- Dates of operation: December 30, 2004–present

Technical
- Track gauge: 4 ft 8 1/2 in (1,435 mm) standard gauge
- Track length: 120 miles (193 km)

Other
- Website: Official website

The Alabama and Tennessee River Railway (reporting mark ATN) is a shortline railway operating (via lease) over trackage formerly operated by CSX Transportation. The line's western terminus is a junction with the CSX (former Louisville and Nashville Railroad) main line in Birmingham, Alabama, near CSX's Boyles Yard. The eastern terminus is Guntersville, Alabama, near the Tennessee River. The parent company of the ATN is OmniTRAX, a major operator of American and Canadian short lines.

The route is a combination of the remnants of three former lines: the Seaboard Air Line's (SAL) Birmingham Subdivision from Birmingham to Wellington, the Louisville and Nashville Railroad (L&N) former Mineral Belt line from Birmingham to Gadsden, and the Nashville, Chattanooga and St. Louis Railway (NC&StL) line (ex-Tennessee and Coosa Railroad) from Guntersville to Gadsden, which once went further north to Huntsville using a car ferry over the Tennessee River. All of these lines eventually fell under the ownership of CSX. CSX abandoned the L&N line south of Wellington, where it crossed over the SAL main line, to Anniston, Alabama. Later, the SAL main line was abandoned from Wellington to Cedartown, Georgia. The portion of the former L&N line from just west of Ivalee, Alabama (near the junction with the NC&StL line) through Oneonta to Birmingham was sold to a quarry owner along the line who intended to operate it as an independent shortline. Almost all of the line was later abandoned, leaving an L-shaped line from Birmingham to Guntersville. CSX operated this as the Alabama Mineral Subdivision.

In 2004, CSX leased the line to OmniTRAX, which gave the line its current name. According to OmniTRAX, there are more than three dozen online customers. The line includes a short branch to Ivalee, Alabama which serves a Tyson Foods feed plant; this branch is a stub of the former L&N line to Birmingham. The ATN interchanges with CSX Transportation at Boyles Yard, and with Norfolk Southern (former Southern Railway) at Alabama City. The ATN also serves the Port of Guntersville.

== Locomotive roster ==
Model	Road number
EMD SD40-2	6298
EMD SD40-2	7371
EMD SD40-2	7204
EMD SD45	408
EMD SD40T-2	5387
EMD GP40-2LW	9401
EMD GP40-2LW	9651
EMD GP40-2LW	4291
EMD SD60M/SD60I	6799
EMD SD60M/SD60I	8721
EMD SD60M/SD60I	8733
EMD SD70M	4669
EMD SD70M	4678
EMD SD70M	4610
EMD SD70M	4683
