= EMD SW14 =

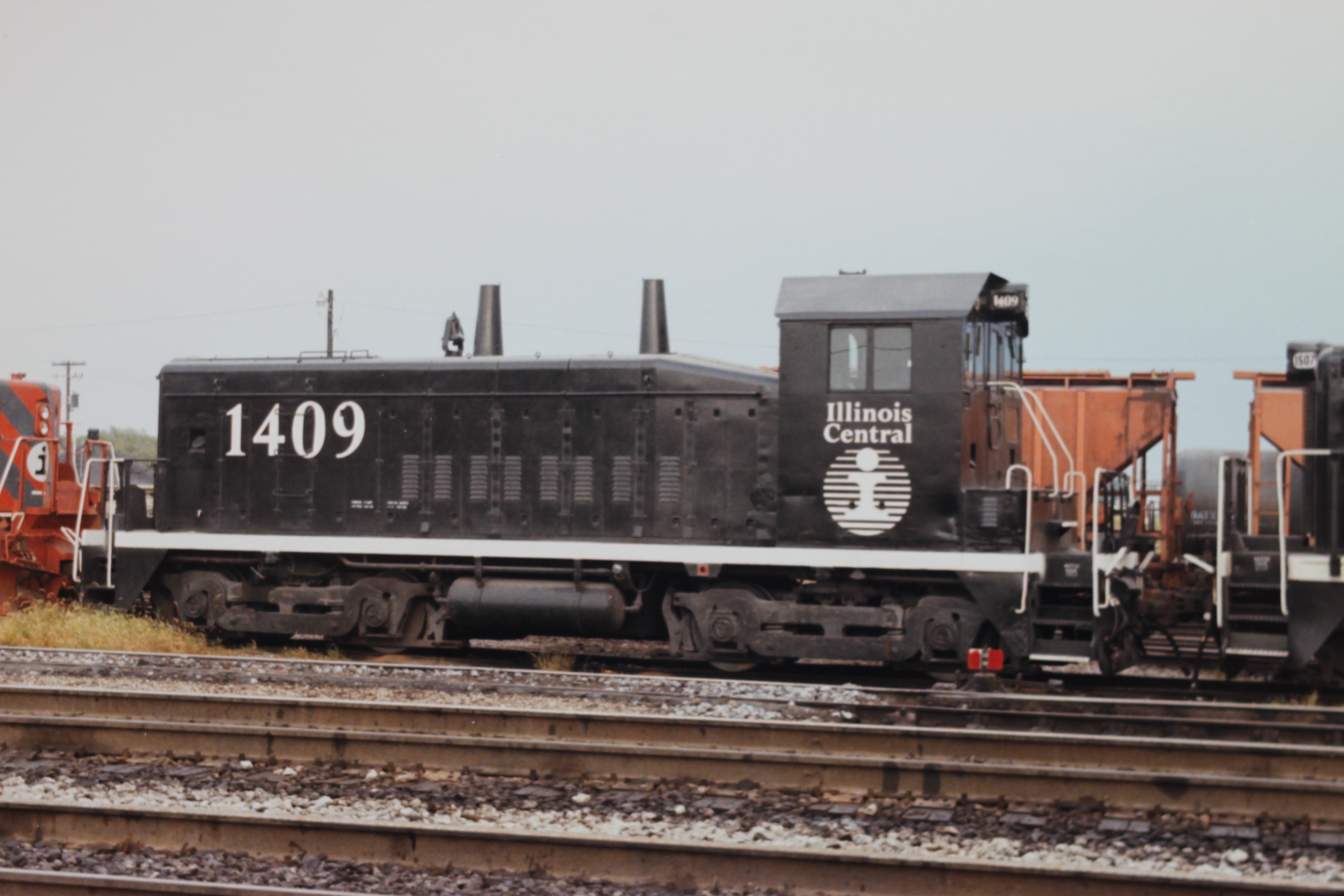
- Illinois Central 1409 in 1988
Type and origin
- Power type: Diesel-electric
- Builder: Illinois Central
- Build date: 1978 - 1982
- Total produced: 112
Specifications
- Gauge: 4 ft 8 1/2 in (1,435 mm) standard gauge

The EMD SW14 is a model of diesel switcher locomotives built by the Illinois Central's shops in Paducah, Kentucky between 1978 and 1982. A total of 112 were rebuilt from EMD NW2, EMD SW7 and EMD SW9s. When Canadian National took over Illinois Central in 1998, 26 remained in service. By 2018, only nine remained operational.
