= Decatur Central Railroad =

Coordinates: 39°58′45″N 88°49′34″W

Overview
- Reporting mark: DCC
- Dates of operation: August 2016–

Other
- Website: official website

The Decatur Central Railroad (reporting mark DCC) is an American railroad that operates in central Illinois. It was founded in August 2016 as a joint venture between short-line railroad operator OmniTrax, which operates the railroad, and grain cooperative Topflight Grain, which owns the right-of-way and trackage. The route, which runs between Cisco and Decatur, was previously operated by the Decatur Junction Railway. The railroad began operation in January 2017.

The railroad's primary market is local grain transportation, though it also serves an intermodal facility and can interchange traffic with the Canadian National Railway in Decatur.

== Locomotive roster ==
Model	Road number
EMD GP38-2	GMTX 2214
EMD GP38-2	GMTX 2227
EMD GP38-2	GMTX 2551
