= Brownsville and Rio Grande International Railroad =

The Brownsville and Rio Grande International Railroad (reporting mark BRG) is a terminal switching railroad headquartered in Brownsville, Texas.

BRG operates 42 mi (68 km) of line at the Port of Brownsville, and interchanges with Union Pacific and TFM. BRG traffic includes steel, agricultural products, food products, and general commodities.

BRG commenced operations in 1984 when the Brownsville Navigation District (the owner of the rail line) reclaimed operations from the Missouri Pacific Railroad. This authority, which manages the port of Brownsville, appointed regional and shortline group OmniTRAX to manage the Brownsville & Rio Grande International Railroad on its behalf. The initial arrangement ran for 30 years, and included the development of an industrial park on adjacent land.
