= Wattsville, Alabama =

- Unincorporated community
- Location within Alabama Location within the United States
- Coordinates: 33°40′53″N 86°16′47″W
- Country: United States
- State: Alabama
- County: St. Clair
- Elevation: 577 ft (176 m)
- Time zone: UTC-6 (Central (CST))
  - Summer (DST): UTC-5 (CDT)
- ZIP code: 35182
- Area codes: 205, 659
- GNIS feature ID: 164904

Wattsville is an unincorporated community in St. Clair County, Alabama, United States. Wattsville is located along U.S. Route 231 (State Route 53), 6.6 miles (10.6 km) north of Pell City. Wattsville has a post office with ZIP code 35182.
