= Wellington, Alabama =

- Unincorporated community

- Location within Alabama Location within the United States
- Coordinates: 33°49′21″N 85°53′34″W
- Country: United States
- State: Alabama
- County: Calhoun
- Elevation: 545 ft (166 m)
- Time zone: UTC-6 (Central (CST))
  - Summer (DST): UTC-5 (CDT)
- ZIP code: 36279
- Area codes: 256 & 938
- GNIS feature ID: 128732

Wellington is an unincorporated community in Calhoun County, Alabama, United States. Wellington is located near U.S. Route 431, 11.8 miles (19.0 km) north-northwest of Anniston. Wellington has a post office with ZIP code 36279.

== Notable residents ==
- Teresa Cheatham
- Lynnette Hesser
- Steve Loucks
