= Nebraska Kansas Colorado Railway =

American railroad

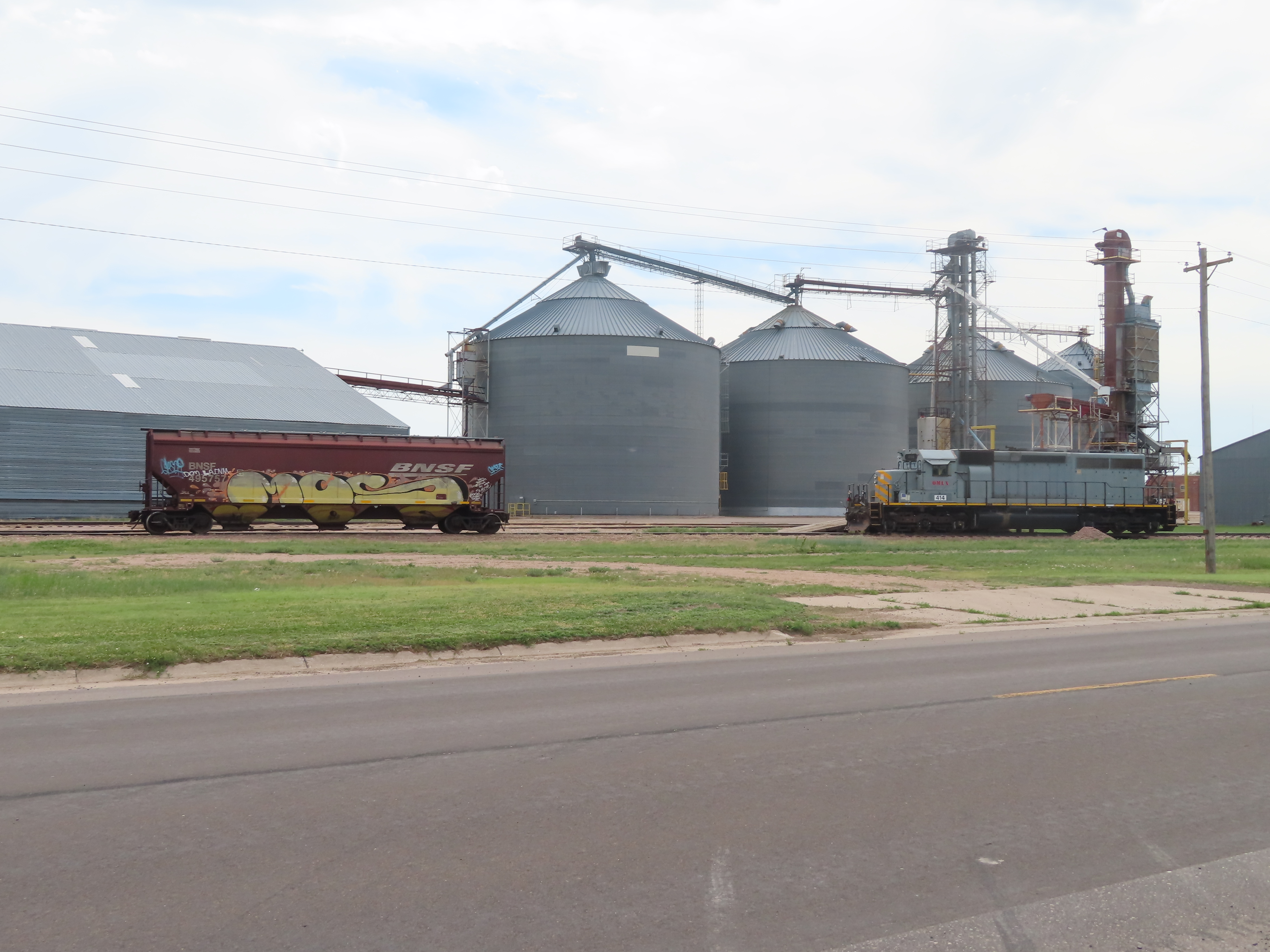
- NKCR/Omnitrax 414; Imperial, NE, 2022

Overview
- Headquarters: Grant, Nebraska
- Reporting mark: NKCR
- Locale: Colorado, Kansas, Nebraska
- Dates of operation: 1996–

Technical
- Track gauge: 4 ft 8 1/2 in (1,435 mm) standard gauge

Other
- Website: omnitrax.com/nebraska-kansas-colorado-railway-llc

The Nebraska Kansas Colorado Railway (reporting mark NKCR), formerly the Nebraska, Kansas and Colorado RailNet, is based in Grant, Nebraska, and operates about 509 miles (819 km) of track in southwestern Nebraska, northern Kansas and northeastern Colorado. It carries mainly agricultural-related products, especially grains, as well as coal to the Nebraska Public Power District's Gerald Gentleman Station which is Nebraska's largest coal-fired power plant. It is owned by OmniTRAX.

== Subdivisions ==
The NKCR consists of 5 subdivisions:

- Holdrege Subdivision - Holdrege, NE to Maywood, NE (78 miles)
  - While the rail is still in place, trains do not run between Maywood, NE and Wallace, NE
- Wallace Subdivision - Wallace, NE to Sterling, CO (112 miles)
  - This subdivision connects to the Gerald Gentleman Station at Wallace Jct., just east of town
- Imperial Subdivision - Culbertson, NE to Imperial, NE (48 miles)
- St. Francis Subdivision - Orleans Jct. to St. Francis, KS (134 miles)
  - While not officially abandoned, no trains have run on this subdivision since 2015
- Franklin Subdivision - Oxford Jct. to Franklin, NE (38 miles)
  - Similar to the St. Francis Subdivision, no trains have run east of Alma, NE since 2015
