= OmniTRAX =

American railroad holding company

- Type: Private
- Industry: Railroads; Port multimodal transportation terminal operator; Industrial park developer
- Founded: 1996; 30 years ago in Denver, Colorado, U.S.
- Founder: Pat Broe
- Headquarters: Denver, Colorado, U.S.
- Areas served: U.S. and Canada
- Parent: The Broe Group
- Website: omnitrax.com

OmniTRAX, Inc. is a transportation and transportation infrastructure holding company based in Denver, Colorado, in the United States. It primarily owns or operates railroads, with a network of over 30 regional and shortline railroads in 18 U.S. states and two Canadian provinces. It is one of the largest privately owned railroad companies in the United States. The firm also invests in, develops, and operates ports, multimodal transportation terminals, and industrial parks.

== History ==
OmniTRAX was incorporated in 1986 as a subsidiary of The Broe Group, a privately held energy development and real estate company founded by Denver businessman Pat Broe in 1972. OmniTRAX purchased the Great Western Railway of Colorado that year in order to augment the value of Broe's industrial real estate developments in northeastern Colorado.

=== Initial expansion ===
OmniTRAX leased the 278-mile (447 km) Kansas Southwestern Railway from the Union Pacific Railroad in April 1991.

In June 1992, OmniTRAX purchased all the outstanding stock of the Chicago West Pullman Transportation Co., which owned the 1.78-mile (2.86 km) Manufacturers' Junction Railway at Cicero, Illinois; the 13-mile (21 km) Newburgh and South Shore Railroad at Cleveland, Ohio; the 72-mile (116 km) Chicago Rail Link at Chicago, Illinois; the 25-mile (40 km) Chicago, West Pullman and Southern Railroad in Chicago; (Note: The Chicago, West Pullman & Southern merged with Chicago Rail Link on August 15, 1996. Chicago Rail Link is the successor company.) the 17.3-mile (27.8 km) Georgia Woodlands Railroad in Warren and Wilkes counties, Georgia; and the Wisconsin and Calumet Railroad in southern Wisconsin and northern Illinois. The Wisconsin & Calumet was sold less than a month later to the Wisconsin and Southern Railroad. OmniTRAX purchased the abandoned Western Electric Hawthorne Works in Cicero, which was adjacent to the Manufacturers' Junction Railway, and began developing it as a multimodal transfer center.

In October 1992, OmniTRAX purchased 800 miles (1,300 km) of track in Kansas and Oklahoma from the Atchison, Topeka & Santa Fe Railway. The main lines of track stretched from Salina, Kansas, to Osborne, Kansas, and from Marion, Kansas, to Scott City, Kansas. OmniTRAX formed the Central Kansas Railway to run on the lines. The Kansas Southwestern Railway merged into the Central Kansas Railway in May 2000, and then OmniTRAX sold the Central Kansas Railway to Watco in April 2001.

OmniTRAX purchased 31 miles (50 km) of track between Borger and Panhandle, Texas, from the Atchison, Topeka & Santa Fe in November 1993. It formed the Panhandle Northern Railroad to operate on this track. Eighteen months later, in May 1995, OmniTRAX leased the 25.5-mile (41.0 km) Northern Ohio & Western Railway from the Sandusky County/Seneca County/Tiffin Port Authority.

=== Move into Canada ===
OmniTRAX moved into Canada in November 1996 with its purchase of the Hudson Bay Railway, which ran from The Pas, Manitoba, to the Port of Churchill in Churchill, Manitoba. OmniTRAX then purchased the port itself for C$1 in November 1997. As part of the deal, the Canadian government agreed to put C$34 million worth of upgrades, dredging, and repairs into the port, while OmniTRAX pledged to add C$45 million in upgrading the port facilities and Hudson Bay Railway. Three months later, OmniTRAX purchased the Carlton Trail Railway track bought from the Canadian National Railway. The 280 miles (450 km) ran from Warman, Saskatchewan, to White Star, Saskatchewan, and from Speers Junction (near White Star) to end of the line at Meadow Lake, Saskatchewan.

=== Post-2000 expansion ===
OmniTRAX expanded its presence in the American Southeast in 2004 by purchasing the 245-mile (394 km) Georgia and Florida Railnet (renamed the Georgia and Florida Railway) from North American RailNet. It also leased the 22-mile (35 km) terminal switching Fulton County Railway (based in Atlanta), and the Alabama and Tennessee River Railway in Alabama. It purchased both lines outright in 2018.

OmniTRAX made its first venture into Washington state when it purchased a 76.5-mile (123.1 km) BNSF Railway route in January 2005. This route, shaped like an inverted capital "U", ran from Kettle Falls, Washington, north to the U.S.-Canadian border at Laurier, Washington, crossed the border to reach Cascade City, British Columbia, traveled west to Almond Gardens, then south to cross the border to follow Washington State Route 21 to Republic, Washington. Another 83 miles (134 km) of line (from Kettle Falls southeast to Chewelah, Washington, and from Kettle Falls northwest to Columbia Gardens, British Columbia) was leased from BNSF. The Kettle Falls International Railway was created to run on these lines.

OmniTRAX completed its purchase of all of North American Railnet's assets in April 2005 when it purchased the 509-mile (819 km) Nebraska Kansas Colorado Railway and the 113-mile (182 km) Illinois Railway.

=== 2010s to present ===
OmniTRAX moved into California for the first time in 2011 when it purchased the 25-mile (40 km) Stockton Terminal & Eastern Railroad, a short line linking several industrial customers to the Port of Stockton, the Union Pacific, and the BNSF.

The company expanded its operations in Oklahoma in June 2014 when it purchased the 32-mile (51 km) Sand Springs Railway between Tulsa, Oklahoma and Sand Springs, Oklahoma. In September 2016, it acquired the 146-acre (59 ha) former Gerdau steel mill site in Sand Springs. The company said it would work with other Broe Co. subsidiaries to build residential, retail, industrial, logistics, and transportation buildings and facilities there.

June 2014 also saw OmniTRAX purchase the Brownsville and Rio Grande International Railroad in Texas, bringing its number of rail subsidiaries to 19. This made OmniTRAX the third-largest shortline railroad company in the United States, behind Genesee & Wyoming and Watco. As part of the Brownsville & Rio Grande purchase, OmniTRAX also received a 30-year lease on 1,200 acres (490 ha) within the Brownsville Navigation District (the governmental entity which runs the Port of Brownsville and other transportation and shipping infrastructure in the Brownsville, Texas, area). Under the terms of the deal, the company agreed to invest at least $8.5 million in rail and port upgrades, and help market 1,200 acres (490 ha) of undeveloped port land. OmniTRAX said it would build an industrial park on the land. By the end of 2014, the firm also controlled the Peru Industrial Railroad, a 3-mile (4.8 km) switching railroad in Peru, Illinois.

By March 2016, OmniTRAX owned 20 shortline railroads operating in 12 U.S. states and three Canadian provinces. In the early months of the year, it spent $14 million restoring 7 miles (11 km) of track between Greeley and Windsor, Colorado. This halved the rail traffic passing through the town of Fort Collins by providing a shorter route for traffic intended for routing along the Union Pacific. In July of that year, the company partnered with the Topflight Grain Cooperative to operate the new Decatur Central Railroad. OmniTRAX purchased 16 miles (26 km) of Decatur Junction Railway track that connected Topflight's facility at the Midwest Inland Port near Cisco, Illinois, with a variety of grain and cereal processing plants in and around Macon County, Illinois. The top companies shared the costs of equipment and operations of the railroad.

OmniTRAX proposed buying Iowa Pacific Holdings' Sanford Lake Branch track (also known as the Saratoga-North Creek Railway), which ran 29 miles (47 km) from North Creek, New York, to Tahawus, New York, in August 2019. The firm also proposed buying track owned by Warren County which ran from North Creek to Corinth, New York. This would allow OmniTRAX to make additional connections with Class I railroads. Local residents, concerned that OmniTRAX would permit its track to be used for the storage of oil tank cars, opposed the sale. Warren County officials did not want to sell their track for fear of losing control over the uses to which it could be put. After a year of public debate, OmniTRAX declined to pursue both deals.

In July 2019, OmniTRAX purchased the 100-mile (160 km) Winchester & Western Railroad's Virginia Division from Covia Holdings for $105 million. The division included 53 miles (85 km) of track in western Virginia and 47 miles (76 km) of track in New Jersey. The purchase was subject to review and approval by the Surface Transportation Board, a federal agency. It was completed in September 2019.

OmniTRAX picked up its 25th rail operation in August 2022, when it was selected to run the Port of Catoosa Industrial Railroad (PCIR) by Tulsa Ports.

== Churchill rail line ==
In 1997, the Canadian National Railway sold the Port of Churchill and accompanying rail line to OmniTRAX as part of the privatization of CN. OmniTRAX operated the railway for the ensuing two decades, shipping mostly wheat to the Port of Churchill on behalf of the Canadian Wheat Board.

In June 2017, OmniTRAX suspended service on the Churchill rail line after severe flooding washed out the line in multiple locations. OmniTRAX refused to repair the railway, claiming it was not economically feasible. The company claimed that due to the closure of the Canadian Wheat Board in 2008, it was no longer economical to operate the line or the Port of Churchill. As part of a 2008 contract between the Federal Government and OmniTRAX, the Government of Canada had given OmniTRAX C$20 million for upgrades to both the Railway and Port with the agreement that the company would match the funds. The contract stipulated that OmniTRAX could not reduce or abandon service on the line, or the funding would be required to be returned.

On October 13, 2017, Minister of Natural Resources Jim Carr issued a notice of default to OmniTRAX, advising the company that they had 30 days to make repairs to the rail line or face default on the agreement. On November 14, the Federal Government issued a notice of default against OmniTRAX claiming C$18 million, plus interest. In response, the company filed a complaint through NAFTA Chapter 11 claiming the Canadian Federal Government had sabotaged efforts to repair and transfer ownership of the railway.

In June 2018, OmniTRAX was ordered by federal regulators to repair the tracks. On August 31, 2018 the port and rail line were sold to Arctic Gateway Group, a consortium of investors including First Nations, local governments, financial holding companies, and grain producers.

== BC Rail ==
In 2003, OmniTRAX was one of three companies bidding for BC Rail, a 1,441-mile (2,319 km) province-owned railroad in British Columbia then being privatized by the government. OmniTRAX officials began communicating with provincial officials in 2001, urging the privatization of the railroad. Although the British Columbia Liberal Party had pledged during 2001 elections not to sell the road, OmniTRAX officials continued to urge them to do so in 2002.

BC Rail officials recommended the privatization of the line in the fall of 2002. OmniTRAX partnered with BNSF to bid on the line.

OmniTRAX hired Pilothouse Communications, a Victoria-based lobbyist firm, to represent its interests. Pilothouse lobbyist Erik Bornmann bribed two ministerial aides from 2001 to 2003 with cash and gifts in exchange for confidential government documents that were then passed to OmniTRAX. Brian Kieran, Pilothouse's owner, claimed he advised OmniTRAX against offering one a gift (a trip to Denver to see a football game), but OmniTRAX officials disregarded his advice. Law enforcement officials never charged OmniTRAX with any wrongdoing in regards to the bribery effort or the receipt of stolen documents.

OmniTRAX ultimately bid C$710 million for BC Rail, a C$4 million increase over its initial second-round bid. Although Crown prosecutors believed the improved OmniTRAX bid was related to its receipt of leaked documents, court testimony indicated that the government's bid evaluation team thought the improved offer was merely an attempt to win the auction. OmniTRAX dropped out of the auction (police later alleged, based on wiretap information) after its officials came to believe that the provincial government had predetermined Canadian National Railway to be the successful bidder. David Basi, an aide to BC Finance Minister Gary Collins, then advised Collins to arrange an unnamed "consolation prize" for OmniTRAX.

In December 2003, Pat Broe and Dwight Johnson (a vice president of The Broe Group) had dinner at a Vancouver restaurant with Collins. Their conversation allegedly regarded the sale of a BC Rail spur line to OmniTRAX. The sale of the spur was cancelled after law enforcement officials revealed to Collins that the sale had been compromised due to the disclosure of confidential government information. Law enforcement officials investigated the dinner meeting, but never charged Broe, Johnson, or Collins with wrongdoing. OmniTRAX strongly asserted it had committed no ethical or legal infractions regarding the meeting.

== Operations ==
OmniTRAX is subsidiary of The Broe Group, a company with an array of financial interests in energy development, healthcare technology, real estate, transportation, and other industries. As of September 2025, OmniTRAX operated over 30 rail lines, making it one of the largest privately owned rail transportation companies in the United States.

OmniTRAX's corporate strategy is to identify companies or groups of companies transporting cargo 500 to 1,000 miles (800 to 1,610 km) but not using railroads to do so. It then looks for unused or under-used rail opportunities nearby to serve these customers. Commodities which the company transports include aggregate, chemicals, clay, grain, and stone. OmniTRAX railroads often connect to Class I railroads.

OmniTRAX also operates ports, terminals, and multimodal transhipment facilities. It sometimes engages (alone or in concert with other Broe Group companies) in industrial development.

=== Subsidiaries ===
OmniTRAX owned and managed railroads include:

- Alabama & Tennessee River Railway
- Brownsville and Rio Grande International Railroad
- Carlton Trail Railway
- Central Texas and Colorado River Railway
- Chicago Rail Link
- Cleveland & Cuyahoga Railway
- Cleveland Port Railway
- Fulton County Railway
- Georgia & Florida Railway
- Georgia Woodlands Railroad
- Great Western Railway of Colorado
- Illinois Railway
- Kettle Falls International Railway
- Manufacturers' Junction Railway
- Mount Vernon Railroad
- Nebraska Kansas Colorado Railway
- Newburgh & South Shore Railroad
- Northern Ohio & Western Railway
- Panhandle Northern Railroad
- Peru Industrial Railroad
- Port of Catoosa Industrial Railroad
- Port Muskogee Railroad
- River Ridge Railroad
- Sand Springs Railway
- Santa Maria Valley Railroad
- Savannah Industrial Transportation
- South Branch Valley Railroad
- Sonoran Valley Rail
- Stockton Terminal and Eastern Railroad
- Winchester and Western Railroad

TransCANADA Switching Services (TSS) was formed by OmniTRAX in 1996. In 1997, TSS won a contract to provide switching services at the newly opened Deltaport, the Port of Vancouver's new container shipping facility. OmniTRAX ceased to provide services at Deltaport in July 2008.

OmniTRAX Logistics Services (OLS) is a subsidiary of OmniTRAX that provides materials handling. In 2016, OLS purchased the assets of Terracor Group, a firm that provided ultra-fine-grain sand for hydraulic fracturing purposes. These included three "frac sand" facilities (in Montana and Texas) and the mineral rights to a frac sand mine in Wisconsin. OmniTRAX intended to supply frac sand to Broe Group energy development companies as well as to other customers in Bakken Formation of Manitoba, Montana, North Dakota, and Saskatchewan; the Eagle Ford Shale of Texas; and the Permian Basin of New Mexico and Texas. OmniTRAX's attempt to open the Wisconsin mine led to a lawsuit in February 2017 by local residents who feared the noise, light, and traffic associated with the mine. Although OmniTRAX won a state permit to fill in 4 acres (1.6 ha) of wetland as part of a proposed 10-mile (16 km) railroad associated with the mine, a state court permitted the lawsuit to proceed. In May 2019, OmniTRAX said it had abandoned the mine project.

OmniTRAX Sand Holdings is a subsidiary of OmniTRAX which provides transportation options for frac sand and ceramics. It is a joint venture of OmniTRAX and Arrows Up, a bulk materials storage and transportation company. The joint venture is marketing the Arrows Up Jumbo Bin, a container which can be used by rail or trucks that is capable of holding up to 25 short tons (23 t) of frac sand or ceramic material. The bin can be used for transportation or storage, and contains its own dust suppression features.

== Bibliography ==
- Lewis, Edward A. (1996). American Shortline Railway Guide. Waukesha, Wisc.: Kalmbach Publishing. ISBN 9780890242902.
