= EMD SW9 =

Model of 1200 hp North American diesel switcher

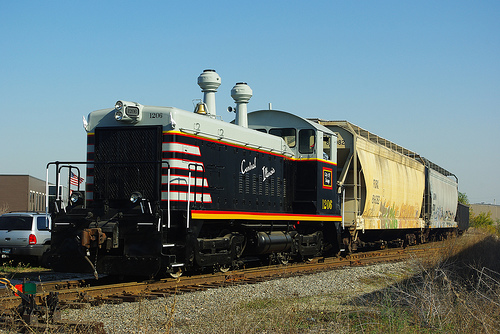
- CIRY 1206, an SW9 built in 1951 on October 31, 2008
Type and origin
- Power type: Diesel–electric
- Builder: General Motors Electro-Motive Division (EMD); General Motors Diesel (GMD, Canada)
- Model: SW9, TR5
- Build date: November 1950 – December 1953
- Total produced: EMD SW9: 786; GMD SW9: 29; EMD TR5A: 10; EMD TR5B: 12
Specifications
- Configuration
  - AAR: B-B
  - UIC: Bo′Bo′
- Gauge: 4 ft 8 1/2 in (1,435 mm) standard gauge
- Prime mover: EMD 12-567B
- Engine type: V12 Two-stroke diesel
- Aspiration: Roots-type blower
- Cylinders: 12
Performance figures
- Power output: 1,200 hp (890 kW)
Career
- Locale: North America

The EMD SW9 is a model of diesel switcher locomotives built by General Motors Electro-Motive Division between November 1950 and December 1953. Additional SW9s were built by General Motors Diesel in London Ontario Canada from December 1950 to March 1953. Power was provided by an EMD 567B 12-cylinder engine, producing 1,200 horsepower (895 kW).

786 examples of this model were built for American railroads and 29 were built for Canadian railroads.

== Original buyers ==
=== SW9 locomotives built by Electro-Motive Division, USA ===
Railroad	Quantity	Road numbers	Notes
Aliquippa and Southern Railroad	1	1200	Built with a 567BC engine
Apalachicola Northern Railroad	7	705–711	710-711 built with 567BC engines
Arkansas and Louisiana Missouri Railway	1	12	
Ashley, Drew and Northern Railway	1	174	
Atchison, Topeka and Santa Fe Railway	19	2420–2438	2434-2438 built with 567BC engines
Atlantic Coast Line Railroad	65	652–716	
Baltimore and Ohio Chicago Terminal Railroad	8	590–597	
Baltimore and Ohio Railroad	6	598–603	
Bauxite and Northern Railway	1	10	
Bellefonte Central Railroad	1	5323	
Belt Railway of Chicago	4	520–523	
Boston and Maine Railroad	12	1220–1231	
Cambria and Indiana Railroad	8	30–37	
Campbell's Creek Railroad	1	13	
Central of Georgia Railway	10	301–310	
Central Railroad of New Jersey	11	1084–1094	
Charleston and Western Carolina Railway	2	802–803	
Chattanooga Traction Company	1	5	First SW9 built
Chesapeake and Ohio Railway	35	5080–5093, 5245–5265	5092-5093 built with 567BC engines
Chicago and Illinois Western Railroad	1	104	
Chicago and North Western Railway	9	1101–1105, 1122–1125	
Chicago, Burlington and Quincy Railroad	2	9269–9270	to Burlington Northern 160-161
Chicago, Rock Island and Pacific Railroad	5	775–779	Built with 567BC engines
Chicago, West Pullman and Southern Railroad	2	47–48	
Conemaugh and Black Lick Railroad	2	118–119	
Delaware, Lackawanna and Western Railroad	10	551–560	
Detroit and Toledo Shore Line Railroad	3	119–121	
Duluth, Missabe and Iron Range Railway	15	11–25	
Erie Railroad	7	434–440	
Florida East Coast Railway	8	221–228	
Georgia Railroad	2	906–907	
Grand Trunk Western Railroad	7	7010–7016	
Great Lakes Steel Corporation	3	27–29	
Great Northern Railway	7	17–23	to Burlington Northern 149-155
Great Western Railway of Colorado	2	121–122	
Houston Belt and Terminal Railway	10	22–31	
Illinois Central Railroad	70	9320–9334, 9430–9484	
Indiana Harbor Belt	7	9002–9008	9004-9008 built with 567BC engines
Anaconda Copper (Inspiration Consolidated Copper Company)	2	22–23	
Kirby Lumber Company	1	1000	
Kosmos Timber Company (US Plywood Corp - Champion Intl )	1	100	Built with 567BC engine
Lehigh Valley Railroad	13	280–292	
Louisville and Nashville Railroad	30	2267–2296	
Maine Central Railroad	2	334–335	335 built with 567BC engine
Maryland and Pennsylvania Railroad	1	82	
Milwaukee Road	3	1643–1645	Renumbered 620-622
Mississippi Central Railroad	10	201–210	to Illinois Central
Missouri Pacific Railroad	22	9170–9191	renumbered 1232-1253
Missouri–Kansas–Texas Railroad	10	1226–1235	Renumbered 12-21
Monessen Southwestern	4	23–25, 27	
Montour Railroad	12	73–84	
Nashville, Chattanooga and St. Louis Railway	5	34–38	
New York Central Railroad	60	8922–8930, 8941–8951, 8962–9001	
New York Central (Indiana Harbor Belt Railroad)	7	9002–9008	
New York Central (Pittsburgh and Lake Erie Railroad)	20	8931–8940, 8952–8961	
New York, Chicago and St. Louis Railroad ("Nickel Plate Road")	12	233–244	
Northern Pacific Railway	4	115–118	to Burlington Northern 156-159
Oliver Iron Mining Company	6	934–939	
Pennsylvania Railroad	36	8513–8544, 8859–8860, 8869–8870	
Peoria and Pekin Union Railway	2	411–412	
Philadelphia, Bethlehem and New England Railroad	4	35–38	
Pittsburg and Shawmut Railroad	9	231–239	Built with 567BC engines
Pittsburgh, Chartiers and Youghiogheny Railway	4	2–5	
Republic Steel Corporation	1	344	
Reserve Mining Company	1	1211	
Soo Line (Wisconsin Central Railway)	8	2111–2115, 2117–2119	
Southern Pacific (Texas and New Orleans Railroad)	5	108–112	renumbered to 2208-2212 in 1965
Spokane, Portland and Seattle Railway	3	43–45	to Burlington Northern 167-169
St. Louis Southwestern Railway ("Cotton Belt")	4	1058–1061	renumbered to 2204-2207 in 1965
St. Louis–San Francisco Railway ("Frisco")	10	305–314	
Steelton and Highspire Railroad	4	40–43	
Terminal Railroad Association of St. Louis	13	1206–1218	
Texas and Pacific Railway	13	1024–1036	
Union Pacific Railroad	42	1825–1866	1847-1866 built with 567BC engines
Union Railroad	14	575–588	
Wabash Railroad	12	363–374	
Western Pacific Railroad	6	601–606	
Weyerhaeuser Timber Company	3	302–303, 305	305 built with 567C engine
Wheeling Steel	2	1252–1253	1253 built with 567BC engine
Total	786		

=== SW9 locomotives built by General Motors Diesel, Canada ===
Railroad	Quantity	Road numbers	Notes
Canadian National Railways	10	7000–7009	
Canadian Pacific Railway	6	7400–7405	
Chesapeake and Ohio Railway	5	5240–5244	
Great Northern Railway	3	14–16	to Burlington Northern 146-148
Steel Company of Canada	1	70	
Toronto, Hamilton and Buffalo Railway	4	55–58	
Total	29		

=== TR5 locomotives built by Electro-Motive Division, USA ===
Railroad	Quantity A units	Quantity B units	Road numbers A units	Road numbers B units	Notes
Union Pacific Railroad	8	8	1870A–1877A	1870B–1877B	Dynamic brakes were added to TR5As by UP shortly after delivery
Union Railroad	2	4	701–702	701C–704C	
Total	10	12			

== Design and production ==
The SW9 was EMD's successor to the SW7. Like the SW7, the SW9 retained a power output of 1,200 hp and the same general design. It differed in lacking the upper hood vents found on the SW7, and with the installation of a 567B engine to replace the 567A found in the SW7.

Starting in October 1953 a number of SW9s were built with the 567BC engine. In December 1953, one locomotive, Weyerhaeuser 305, was built with a 567C engine. The 567C was subsequently installed on the SW9's successor, the SW1200.

In addition to the single units produced, ten TR5 cow–calf paired sets were produced (eight for the Union Pacific Railroad, and two for the Union Railroad of Pittsburgh). The Union Railroad also bought an additional two TR5B "calves".

=== SW1000R ===
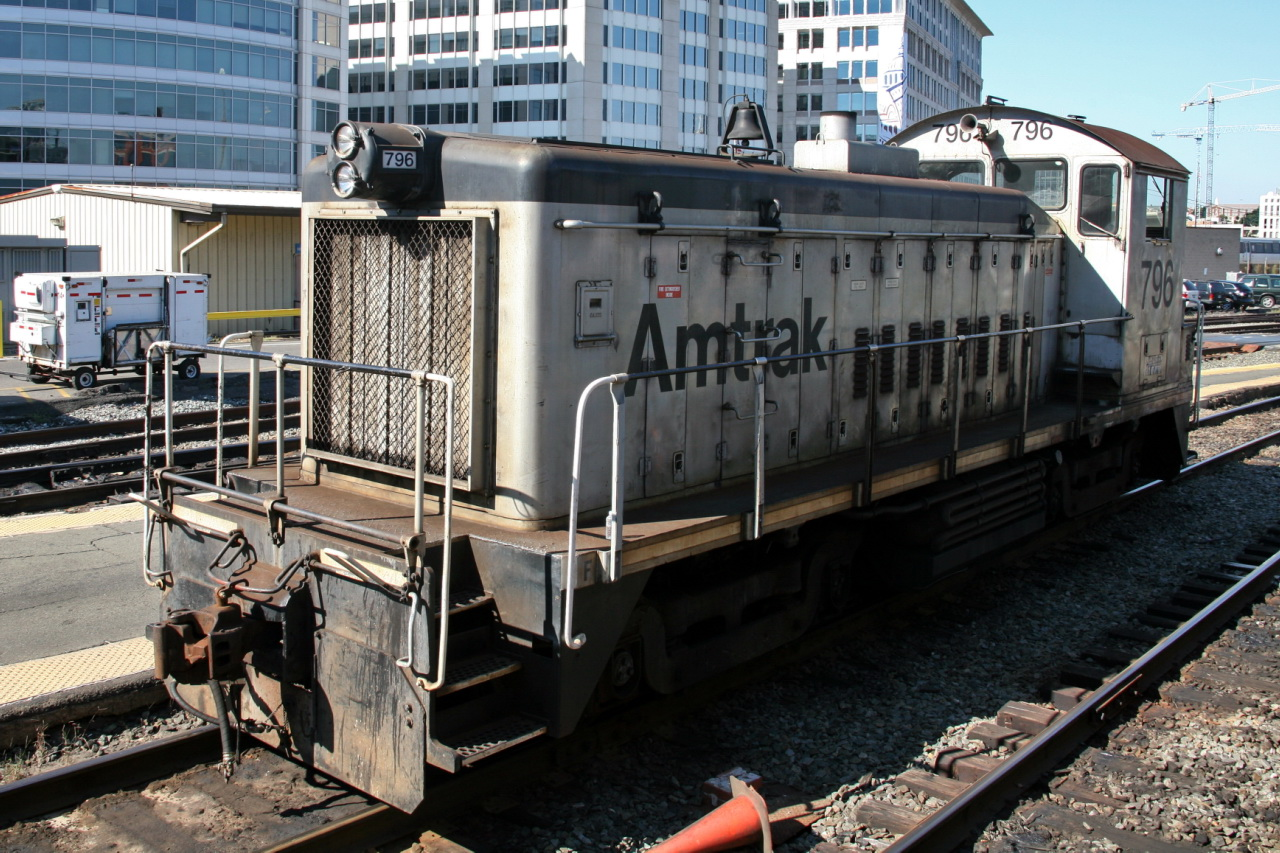
Amtrak #796, which started life in 1952 as P&LE #8959, idles in Washington, D.C. in 2008.

In 1994 Amtrak acquired nine SW9s from various railroads and had them rebuilt by the National Railway Equipment Company. These switchers were reclassified as EMD SW1000R.

== See also ==
- List of GM-EMD locomotives
- List of GMD Locomotives
- Detailed specs
