= Panhandle Northern Railroad =

Overview
- Headquarters: Borger, Texas
- Reporting mark: PNR
- Locale: Texas
- Dates of operation: 1993–present

Technical
- Track gauge: 4 ft 8 1/2 in (1,435 mm) standard gauge
- Length: 31 miles (50 km)

The Panhandle Northern Railroad is a class III short-line railroad that operates 31 miles of track between Borger, Texas and Panhandle, Texas. The line operates on former Atchison, Topeka and Santa Fe Railway trackage that was sold off in 1993. It is owned by OmniTRAX.

== Equipment ==
Road number	Model	Disposition
1200	EMD SW1200	
1800	EMD GP10	
2069	EMD GP9u	
2087	EMD GP9u	
2230	EMD GP9u	
2254	EMD GP30U	
2300	EMD GP39-2	
2301	EMD GP39-2	
FURX 3050-51	EMD SD40-2	
LLPX 3102 & 3104	EMD GP40	
4136	EMD GP38-2	
4310	EMD SD9E	
4370	EMD SD9E	
4425	EMD SD9E	
