= Belt Railway of Chicago =

Largest terminal railroad in the United States

Coordinates: 41°46′4″N 87°45′10″W

Belt Railway Company of Chicago

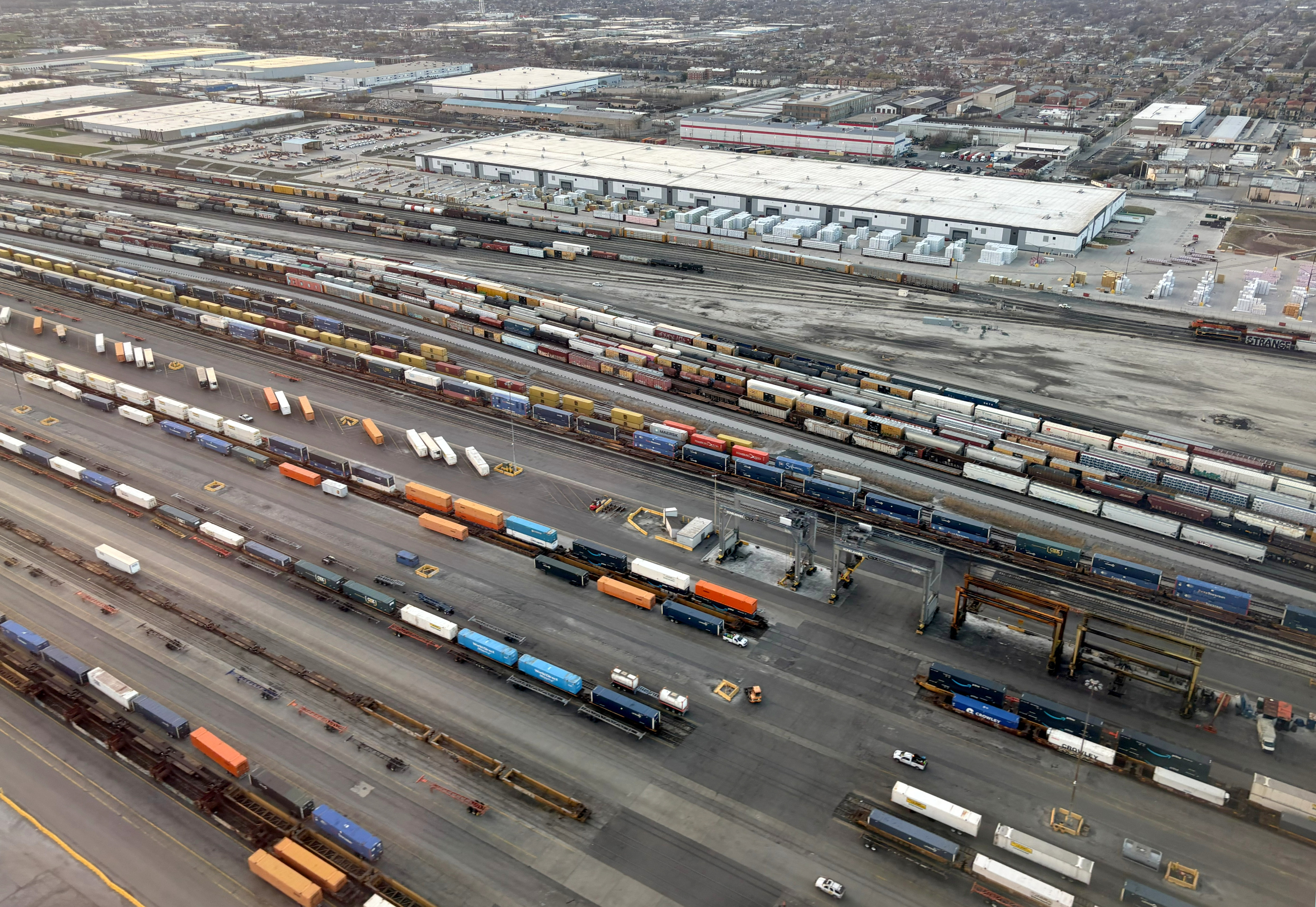
- Belt Railway's Clearing Yard

Overview
- Parent company: BNSF, Union Pacific, CPKC, Canadian National, Norfolk Southern, CSX
- Headquarters: Bedford Park, Illinois
- Reporting mark: BRC
- Locale: Chicago and suburbs
- Dates of operation: 1882–present

Technical
- Track gauge: 4 ft 8 1/2 in (1,435 mm) Standard gauge

Other
- Website: beltrailway.com

The Belt Railway Company of Chicago (reporting mark BRC), headquartered in Bedford Park, Illinois, is the largest switching terminal railroad in the United States. It is co-owned by the six Class I railroads of the United States and Canada — BNSF, Canadian National, CPKC (the BRC's north–south main line's northern terminus is, like the Indiana Harbor Belt, the Milwaukee District West Line in Chicago's Cragin neighborhood), CSX, Norfolk Southern and Union Pacific — each of which uses the switching and interchange facilities of the BRC. Owner lines and other railroads bring their trains to the Belt Railway to be separated, classified, and re-blocked into new trains for departure. The BRC also provides rail terminal services to approximately 100 local manufacturing industries. The company employs about 440 people, including its own police force.

== BRC trackage ==
The BRC has 28 miles (45 km) of mainline route with interchanges to each of its owner railroads, and over 300 miles (500 km) of switching tracks. The vast majority of the latter are located in the Clearing Yard.

== Clearing Yard ==
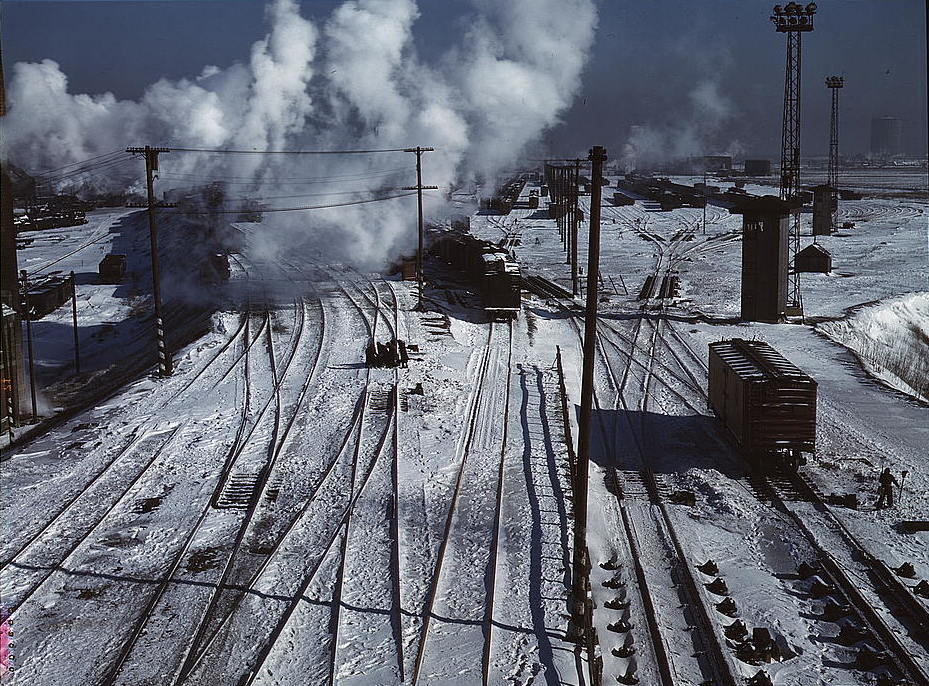
Looking toward the west yard of Clearing Yard, 1943.

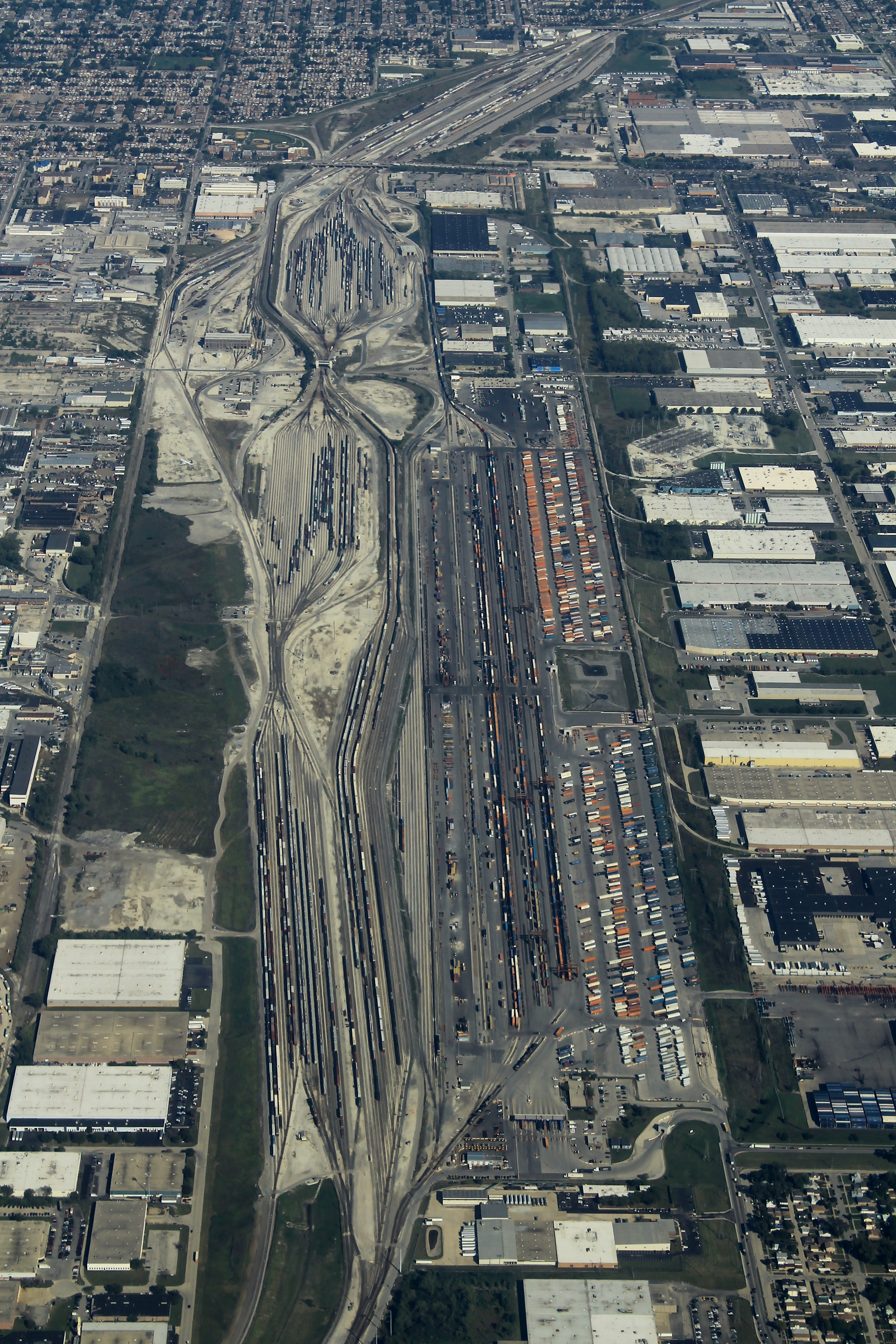
Aerial photograph of the yard

The Clearing Yard, located on the boundary between Chicago and Bedford Park, Illinois, just south of Chicago Midway International Airport directly adjacent to CSX Intermodal's Bedford Park terminal, is one of the largest hump classification facilities in the United States. Some 5.5 miles in length and covering 786 acres (3.2 km^{2}), the yard supports more than 250 miles (400 km) of track. It has six main subdivisions; one arrival, classification, and departure yard in the eastbound and westbound directions.

At the heart of the yard is the wicket-shaped tower which straddles the hump and from which are controlled the switches and retarders of both east- and westbound classification yards to either side of it. Using computer controls, the hump tower efficiently dispatches more than 8,400 rail cars per day. Operating around the clock, employees are able to classify between 40 and 50 miles of consists daily.

== Locomotives ==
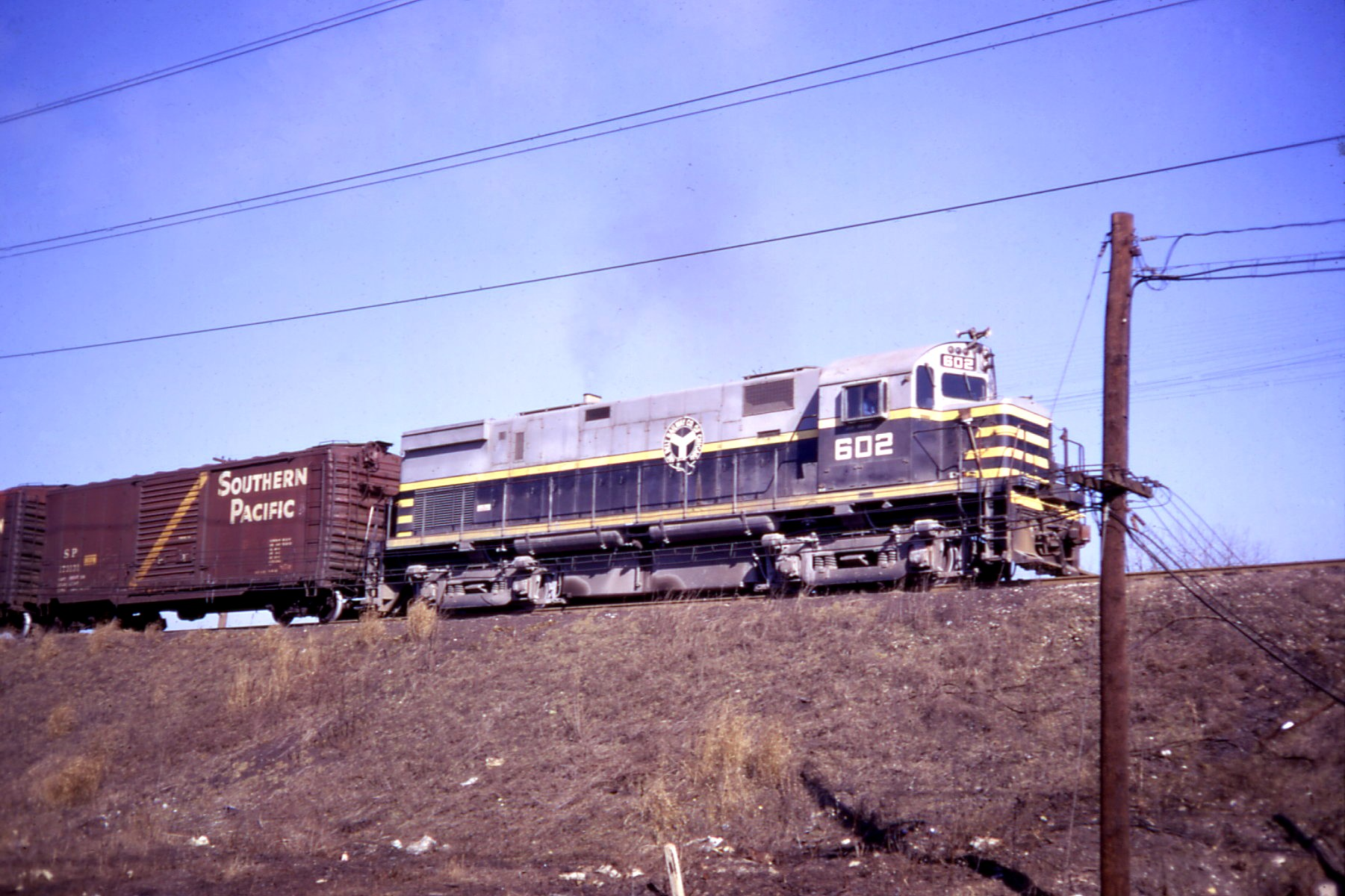
Belt Railway ALCO Century 424 #602 locomotive in 1968.

The BRC was noted for a fleet of Alco-built locomotives, even though Alco did not build locomotives in the United States after 1970. Specifically, the BRC owned six 2400HP ALCO Century 424s numbered 600-605. All six locomotives were removed from BRC's roster and sold. 600 and 601 have been scrapped. 605 is privately owned and planned for return to service. The 605 currently has its own Facebook page. BRC currently operates rebuilt Electro-Motive Diesel locomotives, such as the SD38, SD40, GP38, SW1500 and MP15DC switchers. As is popular in large hump yards, slugs are used in Clearing Yard to shove the hump.

== Awards and recognition ==
The Belt Railway Company of Chicago has been honored several times with E. H. Harriman Awards, in the switching and terminal railways category, for employee safety, including a gold award for 1999.

== See also ==
- Rail transportation in the United States
