= Nealey =

Nealey is a surname. Notable people with the surname include:

- Darwin R. Nealey (1919–2002), American politician
- Paul Nealey, American molecular engineer
- Terry Nealey (born 1947), American politician

== See also ==
- Nealy
