= List of shipwrecks in December 1889 =

The list of shipwrecks in December 1889 includes ships sunk, foundered, grounded, or otherwise lost during December 1889.

== 1 December ==
List of shipwrecks: 1 December 1889
Ship	State	Description
Aldborough	United Kingdom	The steamship collided with the steamship Ascupart (United Kingdom) in the River Thames at Barking, Essex. Aldborough subsequently ran aground at Dagenham, Essex. She was on a voyage from London to the Natal Colony.
Vichuquen	France	The ship was wrecked on Cambridge Island, Chile. Her crew survived; they were rescued on 1 January 1890 by the steamship Sorata (United Kingdom). Vichuquen was on a voyage from Nantes, Loire-Inférieure to Talcahuano, Chile.

== 2 December ==
List of shipwrecks: 2 December 1889
Ship	State	Description
Ferret	United Kingdom	The steam launch collided with the ferry Tynemouth (United Kingdom) at South Shields, County Durham and was abandoned. Her crew were rescued by Tynemouth. Ferret was beached with assistance from the tug Conqueror (United Kingdom).
Unnamed	British Honduras	The lighter foundered at a port in British Honduras.

== 3 December ==
List of shipwrecks: 3 December 1889
Ship	State	Description
Adolph Woermann	Germany	The steamship ran aground at Akassa, Oil Rivers Protectorate. She was refloated with assistance from the steamship King Tofa (Flag unknown) and towed in to Akassa.
County of Merioneth	United Kingdom	The barque was driven ashore at "Bancochico", Argentina. She was on a voyage from Liverpool, Lancashire to Buenos Aires, Argentina. She was refloated and taken in to Buenos Aires.
Falshaw	United Kingdom	The steamship was driven ashore at Brăila, Romania. She was on a voyage from Brăila to Galați. She was refloated.

== 4 December ==
List of shipwrecks: 4 December 1889
Ship	State	Description
Ancona, and Kungpai	Hong Kong	The steamships collided at Hong Kong. Both vessels were severely damaged and were beached. Ancona was on a voyage from Hong Kong to Yokohama, Japan.
Euphemia	United Kingdom	The ship struck the Shark's Fin Rock and foundered. She was on a voyage from Porthcawl, Glamorgan to Penzance, Cornwall.

== 5 December ==
List of shipwrecks: 5 December 1889
Ship	State	Description
Echo	United Kingdom	The tug collided with the steamship Northenden (United Kingdom) and sank off Grimsby, Lincolnshire. Her crew were rescued by Northenden.
HMS Watchful	Royal Navy	The Albacore-class gunboat was driven ashore at Lowestoft, Suffolk. She was refloated on 8 December.

== 7 December ==
List of shipwrecks: 7 December 1889
Ship	State	Description
Nord	France	The ship ran into the quayside on being launched at Stobcross, Renfrewshire, United Kingdom and was damaged.

== 9 December ==
List of shipwrecks: 9 December 1889
Ship	State	Description
Karoon	United Kingdom	The steamship, on a voyage from Savannah, Georgia, to Bremerhaven, Germany, stranded on Razende Bol off the North Dutch coast, and the crew taken off as a precaution. She was refloated the following morning and completed her voyage in tow before repairs in England.

== 10 December ==
List of shipwrecks: 10 December 1889
Ship	State	Description
Attila	United Kingdom	The steamship ran aground off Cape Barfa. She was refloated and put in to Gibraltar.
Blagdon	United Kingdom	The steamship departed from Reval, Russia for London. Lifebelts and papers from the ship were discovered at Hanko, Finland on 13 December. Presumed foundered with the loss of all 25 crew.
Juan	United Kingdom	The barquentine was abandoned in the Atlantic Ocean. Her crew were rescued by the steamship Pennland (Belgium). Juan was on a voyage from St. John's, Newfoundland to Glasgow, Renfrewshire. Also reported as 20 December, which may be the date the crew were rescued.
Lizzie	United Kingdom	The fishing boat was driven ashore and wrecked at Portslade, Sussex, The sole crew member was rescued.

== 11 December ==
List of shipwrecks: 11 December 1889
Ship	State	Description
Ann and Ellen, Starand; Zaripha	United Kingdom	The steamship Zaripha collided with the tank barge Star in the River Thames at London, driving her into the schooner Ann and Ellen, which was severely damaged. Zaripha then collided with the steamship Kent (United Kingdom). Star was beached, but consequently sank.
Ingrid	United Kingdom	The derelict schooner was towed in to Lowestoft, Suffolk by a tug.

== 12 December ==
List of shipwrecks: 12 December 1889
Ship	State	Description
Clara Felicia	United Kingdom	The ship ran aground on the Goodwin Sands, Kent.
Dragonfly	United Kingdom	The steamship was driven ashore in the Nieuw Diep. Her crew were rescued. She was on a voyage from Taganrog, Russia to Amsterdam, North Holland, Netherlands.
Fred E. Scammell	United Kingdom	The barque ran aground on the Ile du Nord, Tasmania. She was refloated.
Iron Duke	Germany	The full-rigged ship ran aground near Dublin, United Kingdom. She was on a voyage from San Francisco, California, United States to Dublin. She was refloated and towed in to Dublin.
Mandalay	United Kingdom	The barque ran aground on the Goodwin Sands. She was on a voyage from Middlesbrough, Yorkshire to Bahia Blanca, Brazil. She was refloated.
Richard Porter	United Kingdom	The ship was wrecked on the Swedish coast. Her crew were rescued. She was on a voyage from Hull, Yorkshire to Rostock, Germany.

== 15 December ==
List of shipwrecks: 15 December 1889
Ship	State	Description
Leerdam, and Gaw Quan Sia	Netherlands; United Kingdom	The steamships collided in the North Sea. Both vessels sank, Gaw Quan Sia with the loss of two of her crew. Surviving crew of both vessels and all 400 passengers from Leerdam took to the boats. They were rescued the next day by the steamship Emma (France). Leerdam was on a voyage from Amsterdam, North Holland to Buenos Aires, Argentina. Gaw Quan Sia was on a voyage from Calcutta, India to Hamburg, Germany.

== 16 December ==
List of shipwrecks: 16 December 1889
Ship	State	Description
Challenge	United Kingdom	The smack foundered in the North Sea north of Flamborough Head, Yorkshire. Her crew survived.
Delphine Mélanie	France	The barque was driven ashore at Tacumshane, County Wexford, United Kingdom. Her crew were rescued. She was on a voyage from Havre de Grâce, Seine-Inférieure to Glasgow, Renfrewshire, United Kingdom.
Progress	United Kingdom	The steamship ran aground in the River Ouse at Whitton, Lincolnshire. She was on a voyage from Calais, France to Goole, Yorkshire. She was refloated on 18 December with the assistance of a tug and taken in to Goole.
Ralph Creyke	United Kingdom	The steamship ran aground in the River Ouse at Goole. She was on a voyage from Antwerp, Belgium to Goole. She was refloated the next day with the assistance of a number of tugs and taken in to Goole.
W. W. Lloyd	United Kingdom	The ship ran aground at Piel Island, Lancashire. She was on a voyage from Rouen, Seine-Inférieure, France to Barrow-in-Furness, Lancashire.

== 17 December ==
List of shipwrecks: 17 December 1889
Ship	State	Description
America	Germany	The steamship ran aground in the Weser. She was on a voyage from Baltimore, Maryland, United States to Bremen. She was refloated and taken in to Bremerhaven.
Ruby	United Kingdom	The steam fishing boat was driven ashore at Berwick upon Tweed, Northumberland. Her crew were rescued. Ruby was on a voyage from Leith, Lothian to Berwick upon Tweed. She was refloated and towed in to Berwick upon Tweed.
Tenby Castle	United Kingdom	The barque was wrecked at the South Stack, Anglesey with the loss of eleven of the fourteen people on board. Survivors were rescued by the Holyhead Lifeboat.
White Water	United States	The steamship ran aground at the mouth of Oyster Bay.

== 18 December ==
List of shipwrecks: 18 December 1889
Ship	State	Description
Eastbourne	United Kingdom	The steamship ran aground in the Elbe at Lühe, Germany. She was on a voyage from Odesa to Hamburg.
Edith	United Kingdom	The steamship ran aground at Rotterdam, South Holland, Netherlands. She was refloated.
Maggie Douglas	United Kingdom	The ship departed from Mobile, Alabama, United States for Queenborough, Kent. No further trace, reported missing.
Maid of Anglesey	United Kingdom	The schooner ran aground on the Goodwin Sands, Kent. Her crew were rescued by the steamship Strathblane (United Kingdom). Maid of Anglesey was on a voyage from Newcastle upon Tyne, Northumberland to Truro, Cornwall.
Romanby	United Kingdom	The steamship ran aground in the Elbe at Schulau.
Wave	United Kingdom	The steamship ran aground in the Elbe at Finkenwerder. She was on a voyage from Odesa to Hamburg.
Wilhelm	Norway	The barque was abandoned in the Atlantic Ocean (42°N 34°W). Her crew were rescued by Zadok (Flag unknown). Wilhelm was on a voyage from Cardiff, Glamorgan, United Kingdom to Bermuda.
Will o' the Wisp	United Kingdom	The lighter ran aground and sank at Dundee, Forfarshire.

== 19 December ==
List of shipwrecks: 19 December 1889
Ship	State	Description
Fergusons	United Kingdom	The tanker was destroyed by an explosion and fire at Rouen, Seine-Inférieure, France with the loss of a crew member.
Laura Fell	Flag unknown	The steamship foundered in the North Sea. Her crew survived. She was on a voyage from Emden, Germany to Hull, Yorkshire, United Kingdom.
Newnham	United Kingdom	The steamship was driven ashore in the Nieuwe Diep.

== 20 December ==
List of shipwrecks: 20 December 1889
Ship	State	Description
Benisaf	United Kingdom	The steamship ran aground at Maryport, Cumberland. She was on a voyage from Benisaf, French Algeria to Maryport.
Cleddy	United Kingdom	The steamship collided with the steamship Isle of Cyprus (United Kingdom) and sank off St. Catherine's Point, Isle of Wight. Twelve of her 25 crew reached Bembridge, Isle of Wight in a boat; the rest were reported missing. The ship's cat was rescued from floating wreckage off Shanklin, Isle of Wight by fishermen. Cleddy was on a voyage from Odesa, Russia to Antwerp, Belgium.
Fairway	United Kingdom	The steamship collided with the steamship Kirkstall (United Kingdom) in the River Ouse and was beached at Blacktoft, Yorkshire. Fairway was on a voyage from Goole, Yorkshire to London.
Lancashire	Norway	The full-rigged ship was run into by the barque Julia (United Kingdom) in The Downs and was severely damaged. Lancashire was on a voyage from Antwerp, Belgium to Buenos Aires, Argentina.
Prins Willem I	Netherlands	The steamship foundered in the English Channel. Twenty-eight of the 41 people on board were rescued; the rest were reported missing. Prins Willem I was on a voyage from Paramaribo, Surinam to Amsterdam.
Wick Bay	United Kingdom	The steamship ran aground in the Lynn Channel. She was on a voyage from Baltimore, Maryland, United States to King's Lynn, Norfolk.

== 21 December ==
List of shipwrecks: 21 December 1889
Ship	State	Description
Alice V. Goodhue	United Kingdom	The ship was driven ashore at North Somercotes, Lincolnshire. Her crew survived. She was on a voyage from Shoreham-by-Sea, Sussex to Sunderland, County Durham.
Sandringham	United Kingdom	The steamship collided with the barque Joseph Haydn (Germany) and was severely damaged. Sandringham put in to Boston, Lincolnshire.
Stad	Flag unknown	The steamship ran aground in the Humber at Whitton, Lincolnshire, United Kingdom. She was on a voyage from Goole, Yorkshire to Nieuport.
St. Andrew	United Kingdom	The steamship collided with the steamship Newent (United Kingdom) and sank off Yantlet, Kent. Her crew were rescued by Newent. St. Andrew was on a voyage from Valencia, Spain to London.

== 22 December ==
List of shipwrecks: 22 December 1889
Ship	State	Description
Adonis	United States	The wooden brigantine was wrecked approximately 15 nautical miles (28 km) south of Crowdy Head, New South Wales when she sprang a leak whilst on a voyage from Wollongong to the Richmond River in New South Wales.
Dunrobin	United Kingdom	The steamship was driven ashore and wrecked near Laxey, Isle of Man. Her crew survived. She was on a voyage from Maryport, Cumberland to Ardrossan, Ayrshire.
Igor	United Kingdom	The schooner was wrecked on the Dulas Rock, Anglesey. Her crew were rescued by the Moelfre Lifeboat.
Jedda C. Yedea	France	The brigantine put in to the Mumbles, Glamorgan, United Kingdom in a sinking condition. Her crew were rescued. She was on a voyage from Cardiff, Glamorgan to Vannes, Morbihan.
Mona	United Kingdom	The ketch was driven ashore near Youghal, County Cork. She was refloated and taken in to Youghal, where she sank.

== 23 December ==
List of shipwrecks: 23 December 1889
Ship	State	Description
Annie M. Jordan	United States	The schooner was wrecked on Gallantry Head, Saint-Pierre, Saint Pierre and Miquelon.
James Williamson	United Kingdom	The schooner was wrecked at Rue Point, Isle of Man. Her four crew were rescued. She was on a voyage from Creetown, Wigtownshire to Liverpool, Lancashire.
Sparrow Hawk	Flag unknown	The schooner was abandoned and set afire 40 nautical miles (74 km) south of Whitehead, Nova Scotia, Canada. Her crew were rescued by the schooner Norseman (Flag unknown). Sparrow Hawk was on a voyage from Charlottetown, Prince Edward Island, Dominion of Canada to Bermuda.

== 24 December ==
List of shipwrecks: 24 December 1889
Ship	State	Description
Ehren	United Kingdom	The schooner was driven ashore and wrecked at Newhaven, Sussex.

== 25 December ==
List of shipwrecks: 25 December 1889
Ship	State	Description
Gemini	United Kingdom	The steamship was driven ashore at Cardiff, Glamorgan.
Jane and William	United Kingdom	The ship was driven ashore near Castletown, Isle of Man.
Wide West	United States	The steamship was wrecked on Destruction Island, Washington, United States, after losing her propeller and auxiliary sailing rig in high winds and heavy seas. Her crew abandoned ship safely.

== 26 December ==
List of shipwrecks: 26 December 1889
Ship	State	Description
Clan McKenzie	United Kingdom	The steamship was sunk in a collision in snow with the steamship Oregon (United States) in the Columbia River at Coffee Rock 47 miles (76 km) upstream of Astoria, Oregon. Two crew were killed. Survivors made it to shore in her boats. She was refloated on 28 January 1890.
Oregon	United States	The steamer was damaged in a collision with Clan McKenzie (United Kingdom) in the Columbia River at Coffee Rock 47 miles (76 km) above Astoria, Oregon in snow, losing her bow, and drifted ashore, later refloated.

== 27 December ==
List of shipwrecks: 27 December 1889
Ship	State	Description
Albatross, and Ida	Norway; United Kingdom	The brig Albatross collided with Ida in the North Sea and was severely damaged. She was on a voyage from St. Davids, Pembrokeshire to Ålesund. She put in to Leith, Lothian. Ida was also damaged; she was towed in to Leith.
Albatross	Norway	The barquentine was driven ashore at Dungeness, Kent, United Kingdom. Her crew were rescued. She was refloated on 6 January 1890 with assistance from the tug Lady Vita (United Kingdom) and towed in to Dover, Kent. Subsequently repaired and returned to service.
Lennie	United Kingdom	The barque ran ashore on Digby Neck, Nova Scotia, Canada and was wrecked. She was on a voyage from Antigua to Yarmouth, Nova Scotia.
Sarmatia	United Kingdom	The steamship ran aground in the Scheldt. She was on a voyage from Sulina, Romania to Antwerp, Belgium. She was refloated and completed her voyage.

== 28 December ==
List of shipwrecks: 28 December 1889
Ship	State	Description
Ailsa Craig	United Kingdom	The steamship collided with the quayside at Dundee, Forfarshire and was damaged.
Clan Mackenzie	United Kingdom	The full-rigged ship was run into by the steamship Oregon (United States) and sank in the Columbia River with the loss of two of her crew. Clan Mackenzie was on a voyage from Rio de Janeiro, Brazil to Portland, Oregon, United States.
Cortez	Brazil	The steamship was holed by ice and put in to "Woosund". She was on a voyage from Hamburg, Germany to Pernambuco.
John Bowes	United Kingdom	The steamship was driven ashore near Gravesend, Kent. She was later refloated.
Eos	Norway	The ship was driven ashore at Rio do Fogo, Brazil.
J. A. Howland	United States	The whaler was driven ashore on Johnson's Island.
Queen	United Kingdom	The schooner was abandoned off the coast of County Waterford. Her crew were rescued by the Dunmore East Lifeboat. She was on a voyage from Youghal, County Cork to New Ross, County Wexford. Queen was subsequently reboarded and taken in to Waterford.
Star of China	United Kingdom	The ship ran aground at Saint Helena. She was on a voyage from Cochin, India to New York, United States. She was refloated and taken in to port.

== 29 December ==
List of shipwrecks: 29 December 1889
Ship	State	Description
Bahrenfeld	Germany	The steamship ran aground in the Elbe near Finkenwarder.
Carisbrook	United Kingdom	The steamship ran aground in the Elbe near Finkenwarder.
Château Yquem	United Kingdom	The steamship caught fire at Havre de Grâce, Seine-Inférieure.
Dux, and Glendale	Norway; United Kingdom	The barque Dux collided with Glendale in the River Thames and was damaged. She was on a voyage from London to the Falkland Islands. She put back to Gravesend, Kent. Glendale was severely damaged.
Edith	United Kingdom	The steamship collided with the steamship Mary Nixon (United Kingdom) at Gravesend and was beached at Tilbury, Essex. Edith was on a voyage from Goole, Yorkshire to London.
Erin	United Kingdom	The steamship departed from New York, United States for London. Presumed subsequently foundered with the loss of all 72 people on boat. A lifeboat was discovered in the Atlantic Ocean (45°10′N 26°20′W) on 8 January 1890 by the steamship Creole (United Kingdom.
Haakon Jarl	Norway	The steamship ran aground at "Flaavor". She was refloated.
Medusa	United Kingdom	The steamship was driven ashore at Suakim, Mahdist State. She was refloated with assistance from the steamship Albicore (Flag unknown).
Ovington	United Kingdom	The steamship collided with the steamship Queen Victoria (United Kingdom) and sank in the Firth of Clyde off Toward Point, Argyllshire with the loss of six of her fourteen crew. Survivors were rescued by Queen Victoria. Ovington was on a voyage from Glasgow, Renfrewshire to Antwerp, Belgium.

== 30 December ==
List of shipwrecks: 30 December 1889
Ship	State	Description
Cherwell	United Kingdom	The barque was wrecked on the coast of County Cork with the loss of two of her crew.
Earl of Durham	United Kingdom	The steamship was driven ashore at Egmond aan Zee, North Holland, Netherlands. She was on a voyage from Sunderland, County Durham to Amsterdam, North Holland.
Effort	United Kingdom	The ketch was driven ashore at Boulmer, Northumberland. Both crew were rescued by the Boulmer Lifeboat. She was on a voyage from Coldingham, Northumberland to Sunderland, County Durham.
Francis Thorpe	United Kingdom	The ship was driven ashore at Bahía Blanca, Brazil. She was refloated in January 1890.
Hibernia	United Kingdom	The tug was run into by the steamship Parana in the River Thames at Poplar, London and was beached.

== 31 December ==
List of shipwrecks: 31 December 1889
Ship	State	Description
Bertha	United Kingdom	The Thames barge was run into by the steamship Bertha (United Kingdom) and sank in the River Thames at Wapping, London.
County of Salop	United Kingdom	The steamship caught fire at Bremerhaven, Germany. The fire was extinguished.
Cronin	Germany	The steamship collided with a British steamship at the mouth of the River Tyne and was damaged. She put in to North Shields, Northumberland, United Kingdom.
Cwnhovan	United Kingdom	The schooner was driven ashore at Moville, County Donegal. Her crew were rescued by the Moville Lifeboat. She was on a voyage from a port in Gloucestershire to Londonderry. She was refloated and towed in to Londonderry.
Indiana	United States	The steamship collided with the quayside at Liverpool, Lancashire, United Kingdom and was severely damaged. She was on a voyage from Philadelphia, Pennsylvania to Liverpool.
Londesborough	United Kingdom	The brig was wrecked on the Haisborough Sands, in the North Sea off the coast of Norfolk. Her crew were rescued by the Sea Palling Lifeboat.
Ringwood	United Kingdom	The steamship was driven ashore 2 nautical miles (3.7 km) north of Staithes, Yorkshire. She was refloated and taken in to Hartlepool, County Durham, where she sank. Ringwood was on a voyage from Amble, Northumberland to Hamburg, Germany.

== Unknown date ==
List of shipwrecks: Unknown date in December 1889
Ship	State	Description
Agenora	United Kingdom	The brig collided with the steamship Whitley (United Kingdom) in the North Sea off the coast of Essex and was severely damaged. Agenora was on a voyage from the River Tyne to Weymouth, Dorset. She put in to Great Yarmouth, Norfolk.
Aidar	United Kingdom	The steamship ran aground at Pera, Ottoman Empire. She was refloated on 21 December.
Alexandra	United Kingdom	The barque was driven ashore and wrecked at Rettimo, Greece. Her crew were rescued.
Alford	United Kingdom	The steamship was driven ashore in the Danube downstream of Galaţi, Romania by ice. She was later refloated.
Andrea Antonia	Flag unknown	The ship was driven ashore at Bahia Blanca, Brazil. She was on a voyage from Sharpness, Gloucestershire, United Kingdom to Bahia Blanca.
Angostura	Germany	The barque was driven ashore on Terschelling, Friesland, Netherlands. She was on a voyage from Hamburg to Callao, Peru. She was refloated with assistance and taken in to Vlieland, Friesland.
Ariel	United Kingdom	The steamship ran aground at Ochakoff, Russia. She was later refloated and taken in to Odesa, Russia.
Barunga	South Australia	The steamship ran aground in the Pirie River. She was on a voyage from Port Pirie to New Zealand.
Beltana	United Kingdom	The ship was damaged by fire at Lyttleton, New Zealand.
B. Kemeny, and Germania	Austria-Hungary; Germany	The steamship B. Kemeny collided with the steamship Germania and was severely damaged. B. Kemeny was on a voyage from Fiume to Antwerp, Belgium. Germania sank. Her crew were rescued. She was on a voyage from Antwerp to Hamburg.
Bonnet	French Navy	The cruiser was wrecked at Ras Makuduchi, Zanzibar.
Charles Napier	United Kingdom	The schooner was driven ashore at "Fidari", Greece.
City of Oxford	United Kingdom	The steamship ran aground in the Suez Canal. She was refloated on 16 December.
Cobija	France	The barque was abandoned at sea. Her crew were rescued. She was on a voyage from Havre de Grâce, Seine-Inférieure to Gaboon.
Dalswinton	United Kingdom	The full-rigged ship caught fire at Galle, Ceylon. She was scuttled to extinguish the fire.
Dora, and an unnamed vessel	United Kingdom; Ottoman Empire	The steamships collided at Constantinople and were both severely damaged.
Durham	United Kingdom	The ship caught fire at Port Costa, California, United States. She was severely damaged.
Eask	Norway	The brig was driven ashore at "Kaageleie". She was on a voyage from Lisbon, Portugal to Ystad, Sweden. She was refloated and put in to Helsingør, Denmark in a leaky condition.
Elefterios	Greece	The brig collided with the steamship Brazil (Italy) and sank off Cape Noli, Italy.
Elisa	France	The ship was driven ashore at Ambleteuse, Pas-de-Calais and became severely leaky. She was on a voyage from Treguier, Côtes-du-Nord to Boulogne, Pas-de-Calais.
Empusa	United Kingdom	The steamship struck a rock off Ouessant, Finistère, Franch. She put in to Torbay in a leaky condition.
Energia	United Kingdom	The steamship ran aground at Maassluis, South Holland, Netherlands. She was on a voyage from Feodosiya, Russia to Rotterdam, South Holland.
Erato	United Kingdom	The steamship was driven ashore in the Patapco River. she was on a voyage from Baltimore, Maryland, United States to Sligo.
Estrella	France	The schooner was wrecked 20 nautical miles (37 km) west of Cape Finisterre, Spain. Her crew were rescued.
Étrangère	France	The yacht collided with the steamship Cossack (United Kingdom) at Bordeaux, Gironde and was severely damaged.
Frontera	Germany	The ship was lost at sea.
Glynaeron	United Kingdom	The ship was driven ashore near Holyhead, Anglesey. She was later refloated and assisted in to Holyhead by a tug.
Gustava	(Russian Empire) Grand Duchy of Finland	The ship struck a rock and foundered off the Norwegian coast with the loss of two of her crew. She was on a voyage from Grimsby, Lincolnshire, United Kingdom to Christiania, Norway.
Hector	Romania	The lighter collided with the steamship Heathmore (United Kingdom) and sank at Brăila.
Holt Hill	New South Wales	The ship was wrecked at Saint Paul's. She was on a voyage from Rio de Janeiro, Brazil to the Sand Heads.
Idaho	United States	The steamship was driven ashore near San Francisco, California and wrecked. She floated off on 20 December and came ashore on "Bentickland Island".
Isa	United Kingdom	The schooner was wrecked on the Dulas Rocks, Anglesey. Her crew were rescued. She was on a voyage from Charlestown, Cornwall to Runcorn, Cheshire.
Jacob M. Haskell	United States	The schooner was abandoned in the Atlantic Ocean before 22 December.
James Martin	United Kingdom	The barque ran aground at Banjoewangie, Netherlands East Indies. She was on a voyage from Samarang, Netherlands East Indies to Australia.
Jane	United Kingdom	The barquentine was driven ashore near Lamlash, Isle of Arran. She was refloated.
Janet	United Kingdom	The brig was driven ashore south of Newbiggin-by-the-Sea, Northumberland. Her nine crew were rescued by the Newbiggin Lifeboat. She was refloated on 20 December and towed in to the River Tyne in a waterlogged condition.
John M. Clerk	United States	The barque was lost at sea. Her crew were rescued by an American barque. She was on a voyage from Sydney, New South Wales to Shanghai, China.
John Ormston	United Kingdom	The steamship ran aground at Hamburg. She was on a voyage from Hamburg to Newcastle upon Tyne, Northumberland.
Jozic	Austria-Hungary	The barque was driven ashore and wrecked at "Beauduc", Bouches-du-Rhône, France. She was on a voyage from Cette, Hérault to Marseille, Bouches-du-Rhône.
Juan Ramos	Spain	The steamship put in to Roses in a waterlogged condition. She was on a voyage from Alicante to Marseille.
Karoon	Flag unknown	The steamship was driven ashore in the Nieuwe Diep. She was on a voyage from Savannah, Georgia, United States to Bremen, Germany. She was refloated.
Kimon	Norway	The brig was abandoned at sea. Her crew were rescued She was towed in to Mossel Bay in a waterlogged condition by the steamship Hawarden Castle (United Kingdom).
Kinsembo	United Kingdom	The steamship was driven ashore on the coast of Sierra Leone. She was refloated. She was refloated with assistance on 30 December and beached in Clines Bay. She sailed in mid-February 1890.
Kong Magnus	Norway	The steamship ran aground at Cuxhaven, Germany. She was refloated on 30 December.
Loch Ness	United Kingdom	The steamship was driven ashore at Dagerort, Russia. She was refloated and taken in to Reval, Russia.
Marco Minghetti	Italy	The steamship was driven ashore on Chios, Greece. She was later refloated and taken in tow by Psara (Royal Hellenic Navy) but the tow was lost off Tinos, Greece. Eighty passengers and crew were rescued. Marco Minghetti was subsequently taken in to Naxos, Greece.
Mathilde	Mauritius	The schooner ran aground on the Southern Reef between 3 and 7 December. She was on a voyage from Tamatave, Madagascar to "Mangasostra". She was refloated and found to be severely leaky.
Mizpah	(United Kingdom of Great Britain and Ireland) Jersey	The ketch was driven ashore at Kingsdown, Kent. She was refloated with assistance.
Monte Rosa	United Kingdom	The steamship caught fire at Savannah, Georgia, United States. The fire was extinguished.
Mute	United Kingdom	The ship ran aground on the Pennington Spit, in the Solent.
Norkoowa	Victoria	The steamship was driven ashore in Wreck Bay. She was on a voyage from Melbourne to Newcastle, New South Wales. She was refloated on 22 December with the assistance of two steamships.
Nostra Genitori	Italy	The ship was abandoned at sea. She was subsequently towed in to Boston, Massachusetts, United States and beached.
Rapid	Norway	The steamship was driven ashore at Haugesund. She was on a voyage from Bergen to a Spanish port. She was refloated in June 1890 and taken in to "Kvalsirken".
Romany	United Kingdom	The steamship ran aground in the Elbe at Schulau. She was on a voyage from Odesa to Hamburg.
Shakespeare	Germany	The barque was abandoned in the Atlantic Ocean before 27 December. Her eighteen crew were rescued by the steamship Gallia (United Kingdom. Shakespeare was on a voyage from Hamburg to New York.
S. J. Musson	United Kingdom	The brigantine was wrecked on Grand Cayman, Cayman Islands. Her crew were rescued.
St. Dunstan	United Kingdom	The steamship collided with a Royal Navy ship at Singapore, Straits Settlements and was beached.
Strathclyde	United Kingdom	The steamship ran aground in the Suez Canal. She was refloated and take in to Alexandria, Egypt in a leaky condition.
Thorbeke VII	Netherlands	The barque collided with the steamship P. Caland (Netherlands) and sank in the Nordzeekanaal. Thorbeke VII was on a voyage from Java, Netherlands East Indies to Amsterdam. She was later refloaed and taken in to Amsterdam, North Holland, where she arrived on 31 December.
Tiogo	Flag unknown	The steamship ran aground in the Strait of Mackinac.
Vesta	United Kingdom	The ship was destroyed by fire at sea. Her crew were rescued. She was on a voyage from Sunderland, County Durham to Valparaíso, Chile.
Warrington	United Kingdom	The steamship collided with the steamship Harsley (United Kingdom) and was severely damaged. Warrington was taken in to Hamburg.
