= Oregon Railroad and Navigation Company =

Railway company

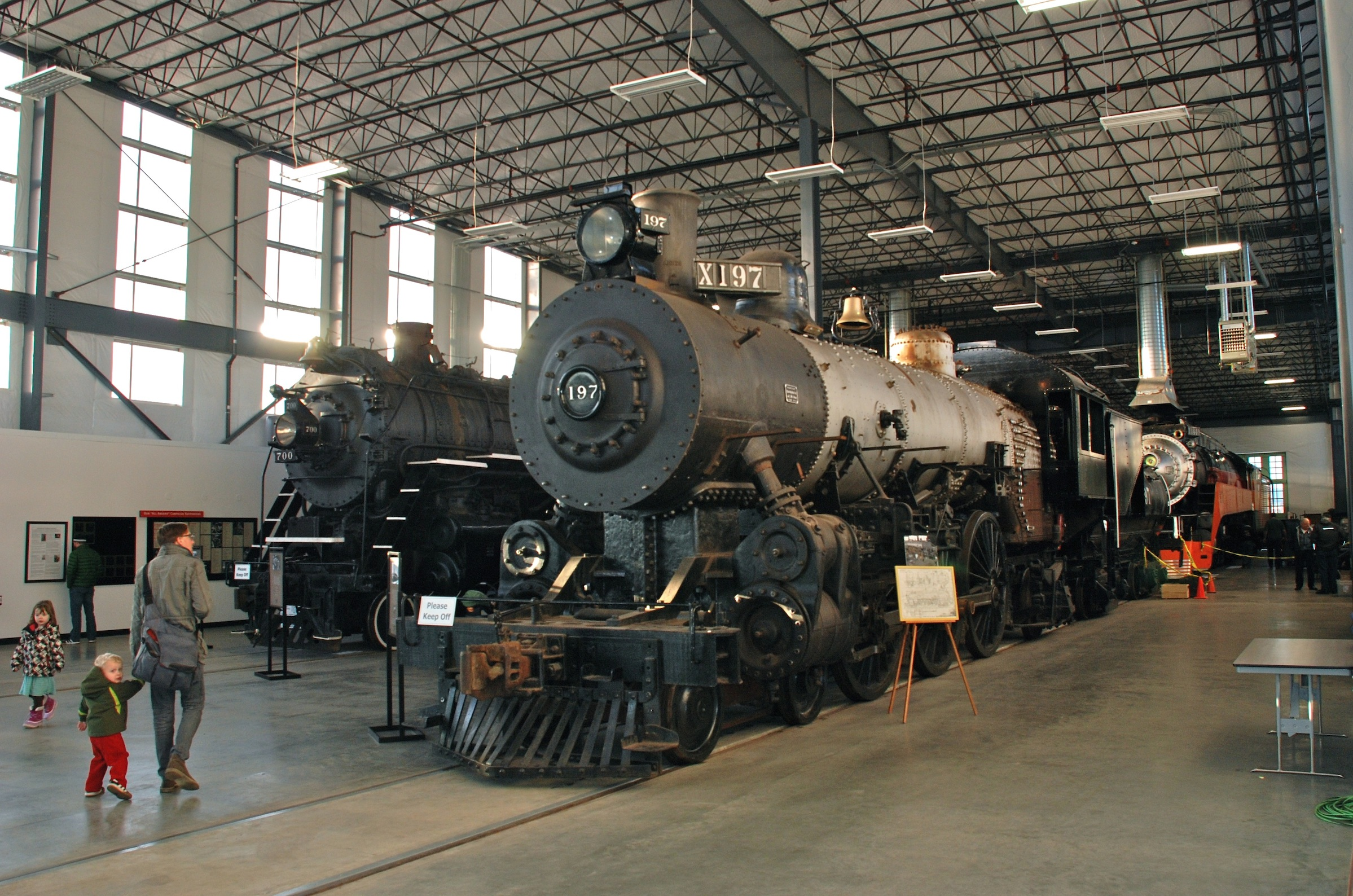
- OR&N 197 at Oregon Rail Heritage Center
- Type: Subsidiary of the Union Pacific Railroad
- Industry: Railroad and Shipping
- Founded: 1879 (Origins trace back to 1860)
- Defunct: 1910 (O.R. & N); 1936 (O.W.R. & N)
- Successor: Oregon-Washington Railroad and Navigation Company; Union Pacific Railroad
- Headquarters: United States
- Area served: United States
- Key people: Henry Villard
- Parent: Union Pacific Railroad Company

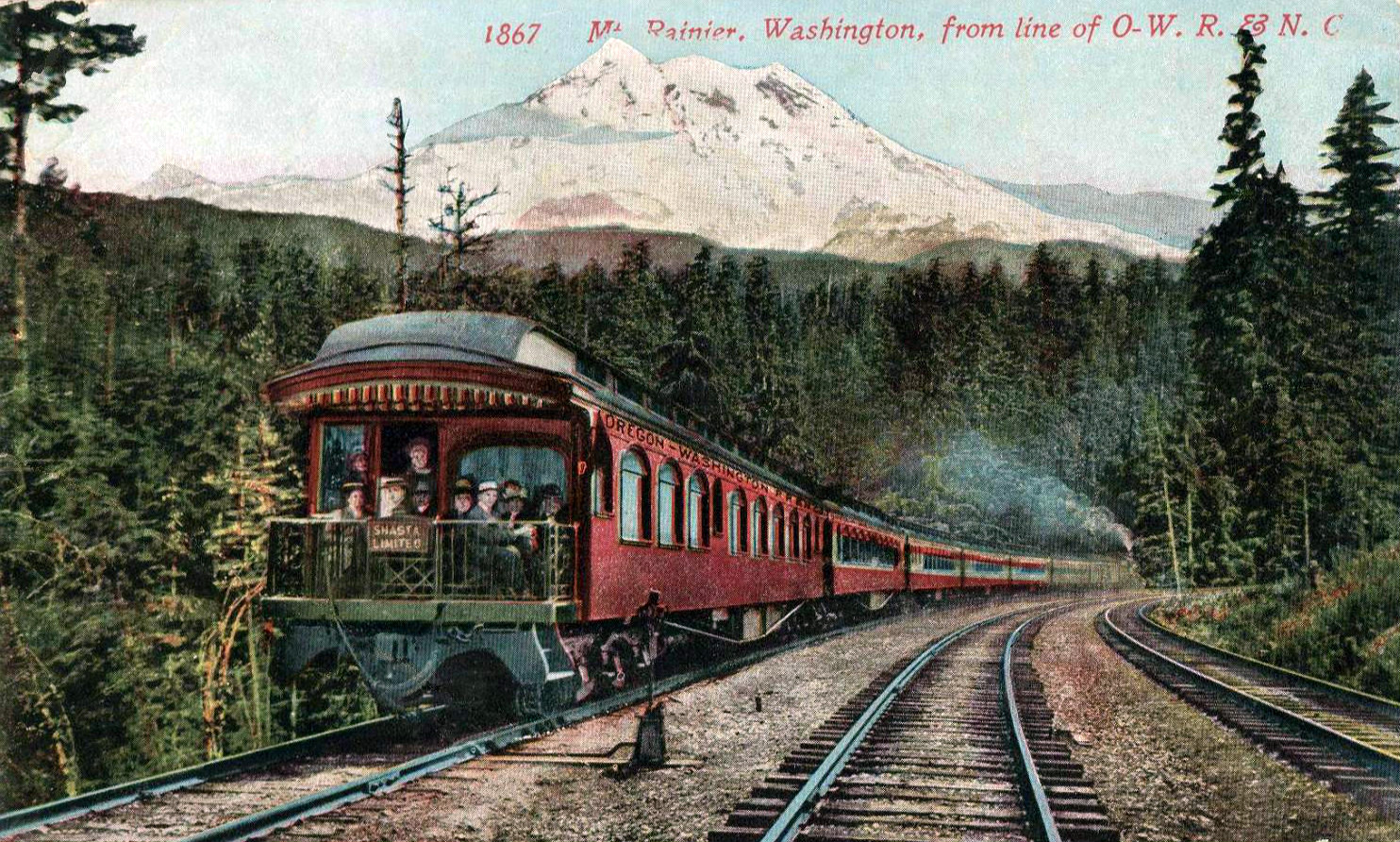
Southern Pacific's Shasta Limited on the OWR & N.

The Oregon Railroad and Navigation Company (OR&N) was a rail and steamboat transport company that operated a rail network of 1,143 miles (1,839 km) running east from Portland, Oregon, United States, to northeastern Oregon, northeastern Washington, and northern Idaho. It operated from 1896 as a consolidation of several smaller railroads.

OR&N was initially operated as an independent carrier, but Union Pacific (UP) purchased a majority stake in the line in 1898. It became a subsidiary of UP titled the Oregon–Washington Railroad and Navigation Company in 1910. In 1936, Union Pacific formally absorbed the system, which became UP's gateway to the Pacific Northwest.

== Predecessors ==
The OR&N was made up of several railroads:

- Columbia Southern Railway from Biggs to Shaniko, Oregon.
- Oregon Railway and Navigation Company traces its roots back as far as 1860. It was incorporated in 1879 in Portland, Oregon and operated between Portland and eastern Washington and Oregon until 1896, when it was reorganized into the Oregon Railroad and Navigation Company. The Oregon Railway and Navigation Company was the core 643 miles (1,035 km)of the OR&N. Its route eventually became the backbone of Union Pacific Railroad's mainline from Utah to the Pacific Northwest.
- Columbia and Palouse Railroad was incorporated in 1882 and built 145 miles (233 km) of track. The track ran from Connell, Washington, where it interchanged with the Northern Pacific Railway and ran east through Hooper, La Crosse, Winona and Colfax. At Colfax, one line ran northeast to Farmington, Washington, located on the Idaho state line. The other line ran southeast from Colfax to Moscow, Idaho. The railroad was a non-operating subsidiary of the OR&N in 1888 and was eventually sold to the OR&N in 1910.
- Walla Walla and Columbia River Railroad was a wood-railed narrow-gauge railroad incorporated in 1868 at Walla Walla, Washington, and built 46 miles (74 km) of track from Wallula, Washington. The track went east from Wallula to Touchet, Frenchtown and Whitman. At Whitman, the line continued east to Walla Walla and a branch that was built in 1879 went south to Blue Mountain, Oregon via Barrett (Milton). The first 33 miles (53 km) took 6 years to build. In 1881 the railroad came under the control of the OR&N, and the narrow-gauge was converted to standard gauge. In 1910, the Walla Walla and Columbia River Railroad was consolidated into the OR&N.
- Mill Creek Flume and Manufacturing was incorporated in 1880 as a narrow gauge lumber carrier operating 13 miles (21 km) of track between Walla Walla and Dixie. In 1903 the Mill Creek Flume and Manufacturing Company was purchased by the OR&N and renamed the Mill Creek Railroad. The track was standardized in 1905. After the track was standardized, the OR&N sold the Mill Creek Railroad and it was merged into the Washington and Columbia River Railway which became part of the Northern Pacific Railway in 1907.
- Oregon Railway Extensions Company was incorporated in 1888 at Portland and built 69 miles (111 km) of track with two branches. One branch ran from La Grande, Oregon where it interchanged with the OR&N and then ran northeast to Elgin. The other branch ran from Winona, Washington, to Seltice via St. John, Sunset, Thornton and Oakesdale. The railroad was a non-operating subsidiary of the OR&N. In 1896 it was sold at foreclosure to the OR&N.
- Washington and Idaho Railroad was incorporated in 1886 and was also sold at foreclosure to the OR&N in 1896. The Washington and Idaho Railroad operated 154 miles (248 km) of track. The O.R.&.N. gained access to Burke, Idaho through the acquisition of the Washington and Idaho Railroad. Union Pacific continued to operate the Washington and Idaho to Burke until 1985 after the O.R.&.N. abandoned it in 1936–38.
- Idaho Northern Railroad was built as a subsidiary of the O.R.&.N. and was absorbed as a branch-line in 1910.

== Development of the Oregon Railway and Navigation Company ==
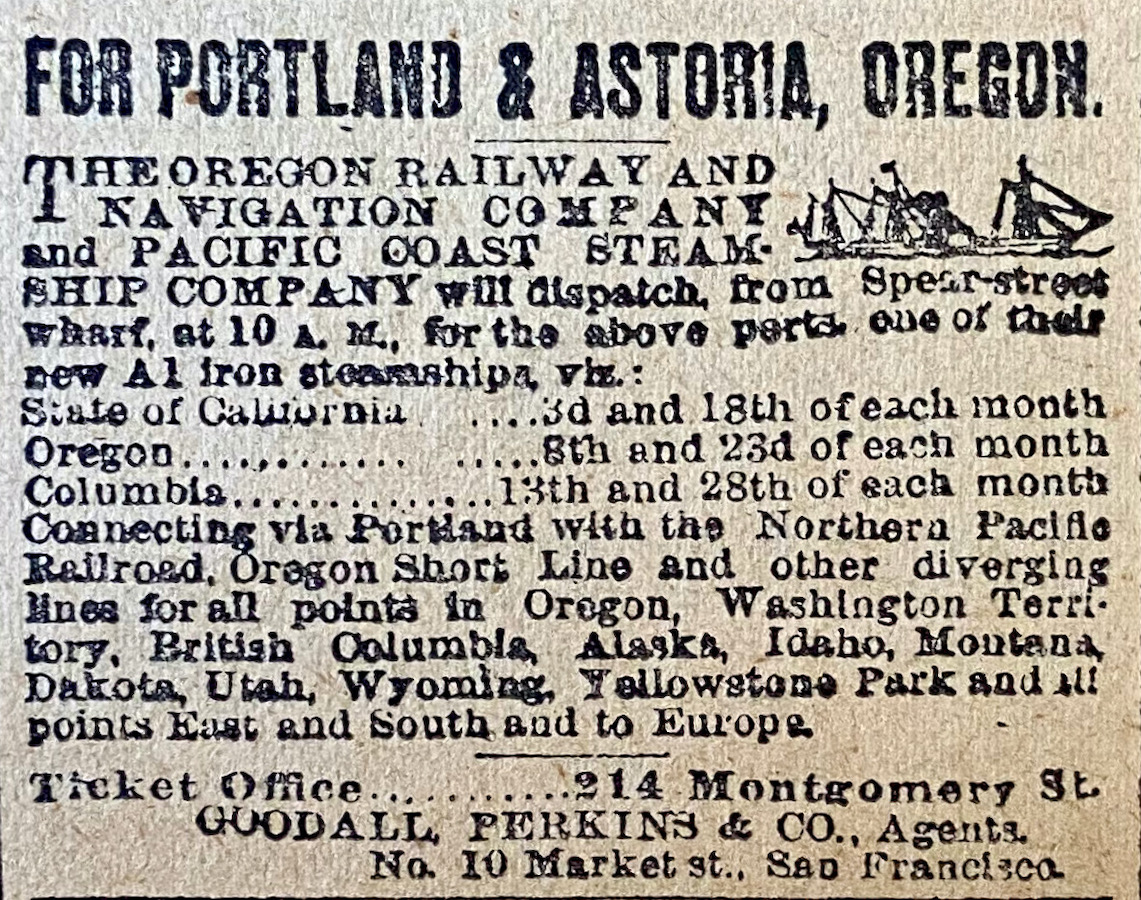
Advertisement in 1887

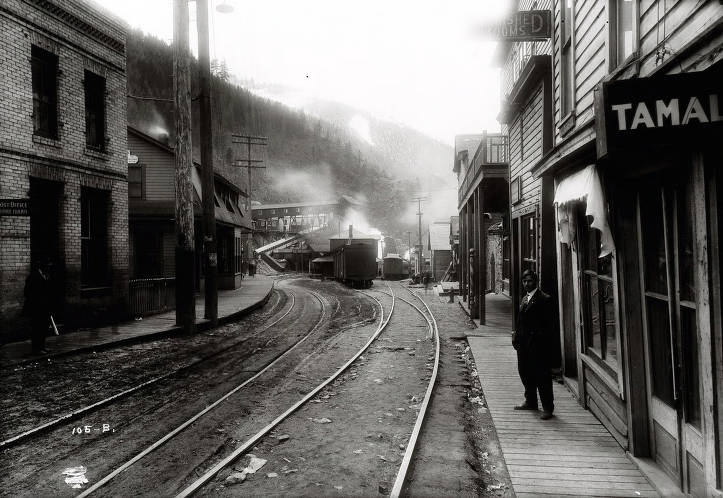
The ghost town of Burke, Idaho was situated in such a narrow canyon that the O.R.&.N. and Northern Pacific operated on main street. (1914) The Tiger Hotel was built over the tracks due to space constraints.

The Oregon Railway and Navigation Company's purchase of the Oregon Steam Navigation Company in 1880 gave it a partial route on the south (Oregon) side of the Columbia River. The company then pursued expansion of its Columbia River route, surveying from where the Oregon Steam Navigation tracks ended at Celilo and continuing east to Wallula. By 1882 the route along the Columbia River was complete.

Starting in 1880, one of the competitors of the Oregon Railway and Navigation Company was the Shaver Transportation Company.

=== Blue Mountain route ===
The company purchased right-of-way in 1882 from Alfred B. Meacham and John Harvey Meacham, along their Meacham Road through the Blue Mountains. The Meacham road, built in 1862, had a lower pass (4,185 feet (1,276 m)) than competing roads, and was a corduroy road, allowing it to hold up in poor weather conditions. The railroad was laid in 1884.

== Shipping ==
Before 1879, the Oregon Steamship Company provided passenger service onboard coastal steamships from San Francisco, California, to Portland, Oregon, while the Oregon Steam Navigation Company operated multiple steamboats along the Columbia River. That year, the Oregon Railroad and Navigation Company purchased the entirety of both companies, which helped to create a monopoly over transportation in Oregon. The large steamships City of Chester, George W. Elder and Oregon were included in the purchase.

=== Columbia ===
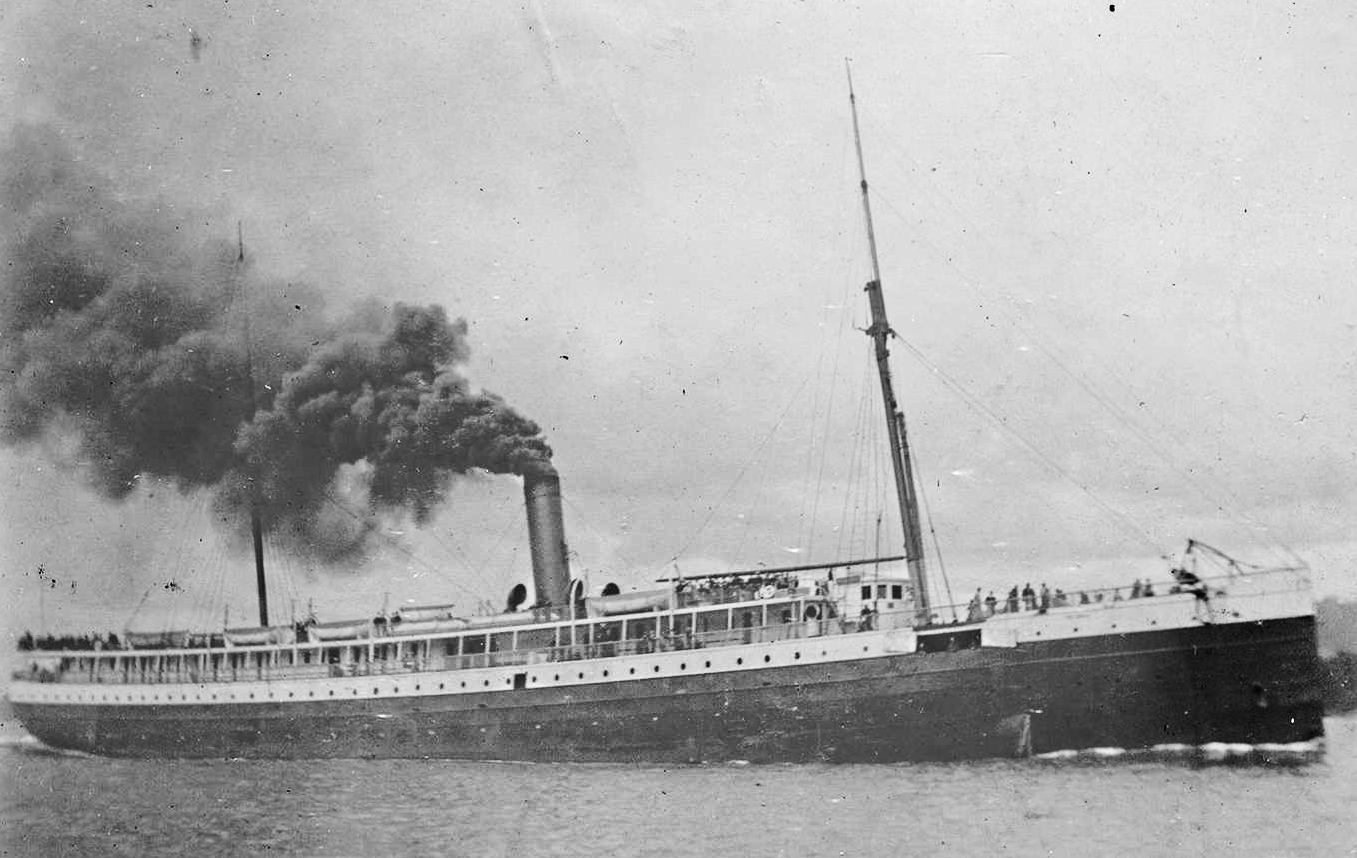
The innovative and ill-fated Columbia.

In 1880, the Oregon Railroad and Navigation Company accepted delivery of the steamship Columbia from John Roach & Sons in Chester, Pennsylvania. Columbia was innovative for her time as she featured a dynamo that powered electric light bulbs, instead of oil-based lanterns. Columbia mainly served on the San Francisco, California, to Portland, Oregon, run in her career. Columbia remained with the company after the Union Pacific takeover in 1898. The shipping faction of the Oregon Railroad and Navigation Company that operated Columbia was renamed the San Francisco and Portland Steamship Company in 1904. Columbia was lost on July 20, 1907, following a collision with the schooner San Pedro.

=== George W. Elder ===
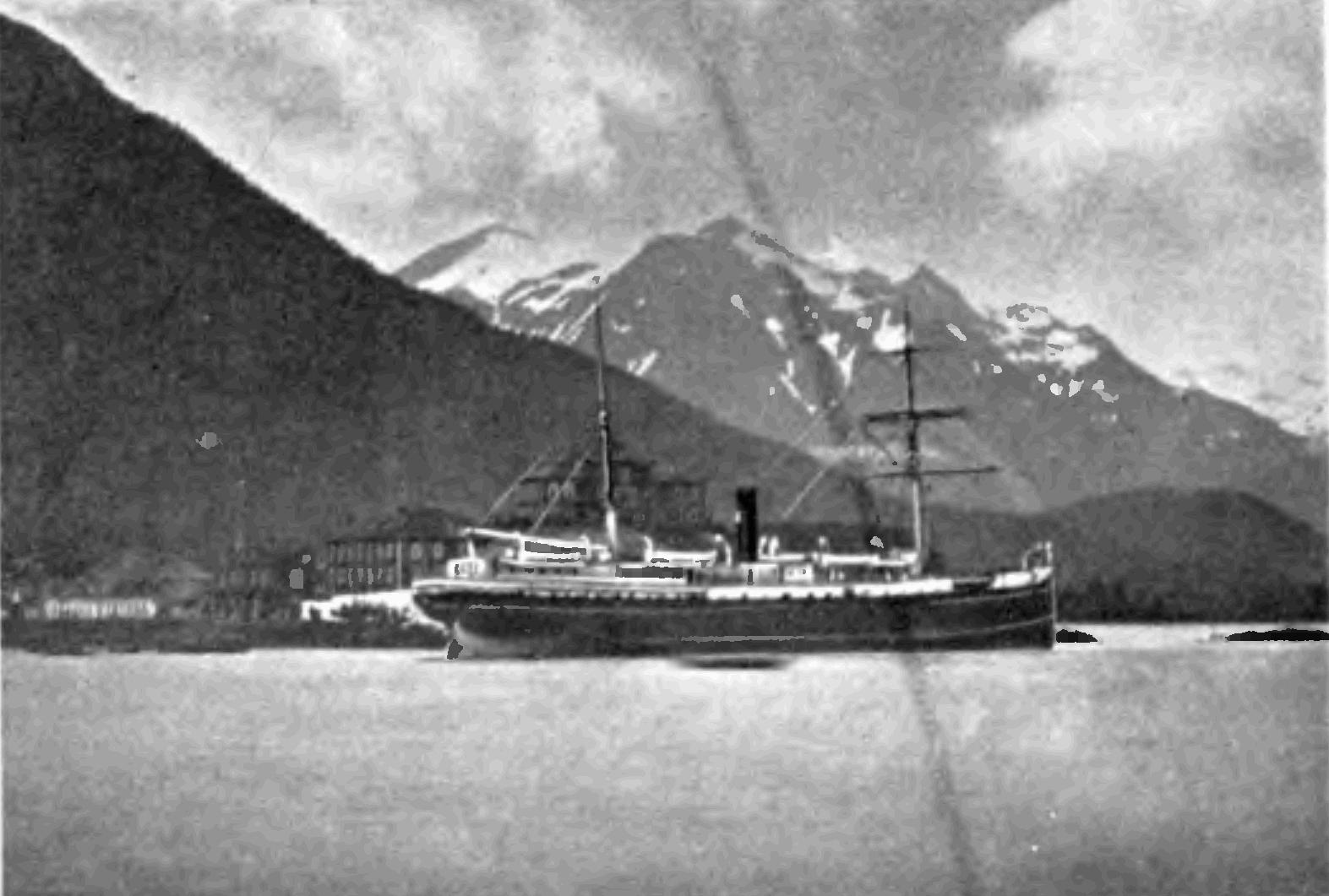
An undated photograph of the George W. Elder in Sitka, Alaska.

The George W. Elder was another steamship operated by the Oregon Railroad and Navigation Company. Originally an east coast steamer built by John Roach & Sons in Chester, Pennsylvania, the George W. Elder was purchased by the Oregon Steamship Company and sailed around Cape Horn to Oregon in 1876. The Oregon Steamship Company later sold the George W. Elder to the Oregon Railroad and Navigation Company. On May 31, 1899, the George W. Elder left Seattle, Washington, carrying 126 passengers and crew on a 9,000-mile (14,000 km) scientific expedition to Russia, visiting Alaska and British Columbia along the way. Later that year, the George W. Elder was used as a troopship in the Philippines by the U.S. Army. The George W. Elder Continued to operate with the Oregon Railroad and Navigation Company until 1904, when it was transferred to the San Francisco and Portland Steamship Company. In 1905, the George W. Elder struck a rock in the Columbia River and sank into 16 feet (5 m) of water. The ship was subsequently raised and acquired by the North Pacific Steamship Company. In 1907, the George W. Elder helped rescue the survivors of the Columbia. The ultimate fate of the George W. Elder following its retirement in 1935 remains uncertain.

=== Other ships ===
The house flag of the O.R. & N's shipping division.

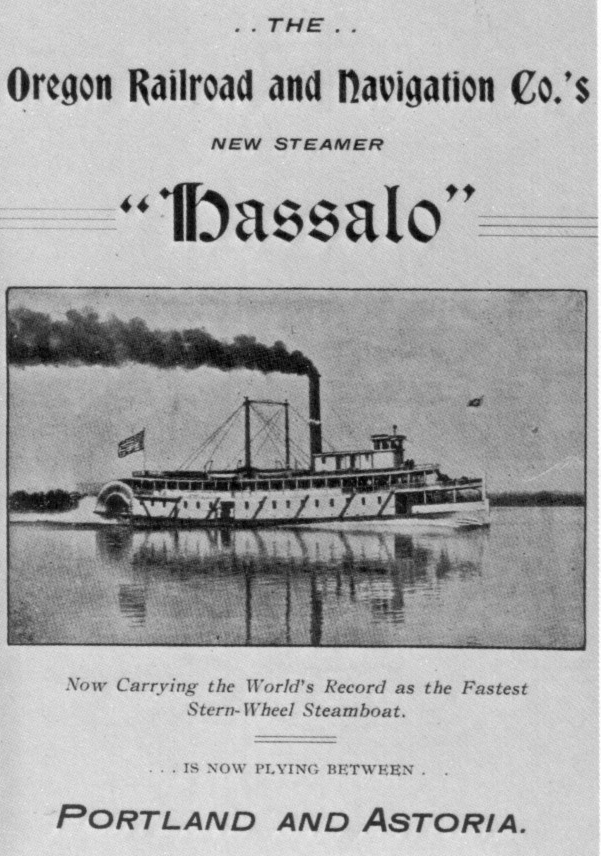
1899 advertisement for the steamboat Hassalo.

The 1899 Annual Report of Directors for the Oregon Railroad & Navigation Company lists 26 or 27 other ships besides the Columbia and George W. Elder between June 30, 1898, and June 30, 1899. The fleet listing from June 30, 1898, to June 30, 1899, goes as follows

Steamships

- Columbia
- State of California
- City of Chester
- Oregon
- George W. Elder
- Victorian - Reported to have been sold between 1898 and 1899.
- Olympian

River Steamers

- T.J. Potter
- R.R. Thompson
- Harvest Queen
- D.S. Baker
- Sehome
- Almota
- Emma Hayward
- Hassalo (Original) - Removed from service between 1898 and 1899. Reasoning given says Hassalo was "worn out".
- Modoc
- Oklahoma
- Elmore
- Ruth
- Gypsy
- Lewiston
- Spokane - Constructed between 1898 and 1899.
- Hassalo (Later) - Constructed between 1898 and 1899.

Tug boats

- Escort
- Wallowa - Constructed in 1889 and still exists today.

Barges

- Columbia's Chief
- Atlas
- Wyatchie
- Autocrat
- Siwash

== Predecessors of the Oregon Railway and Navigation Company ==
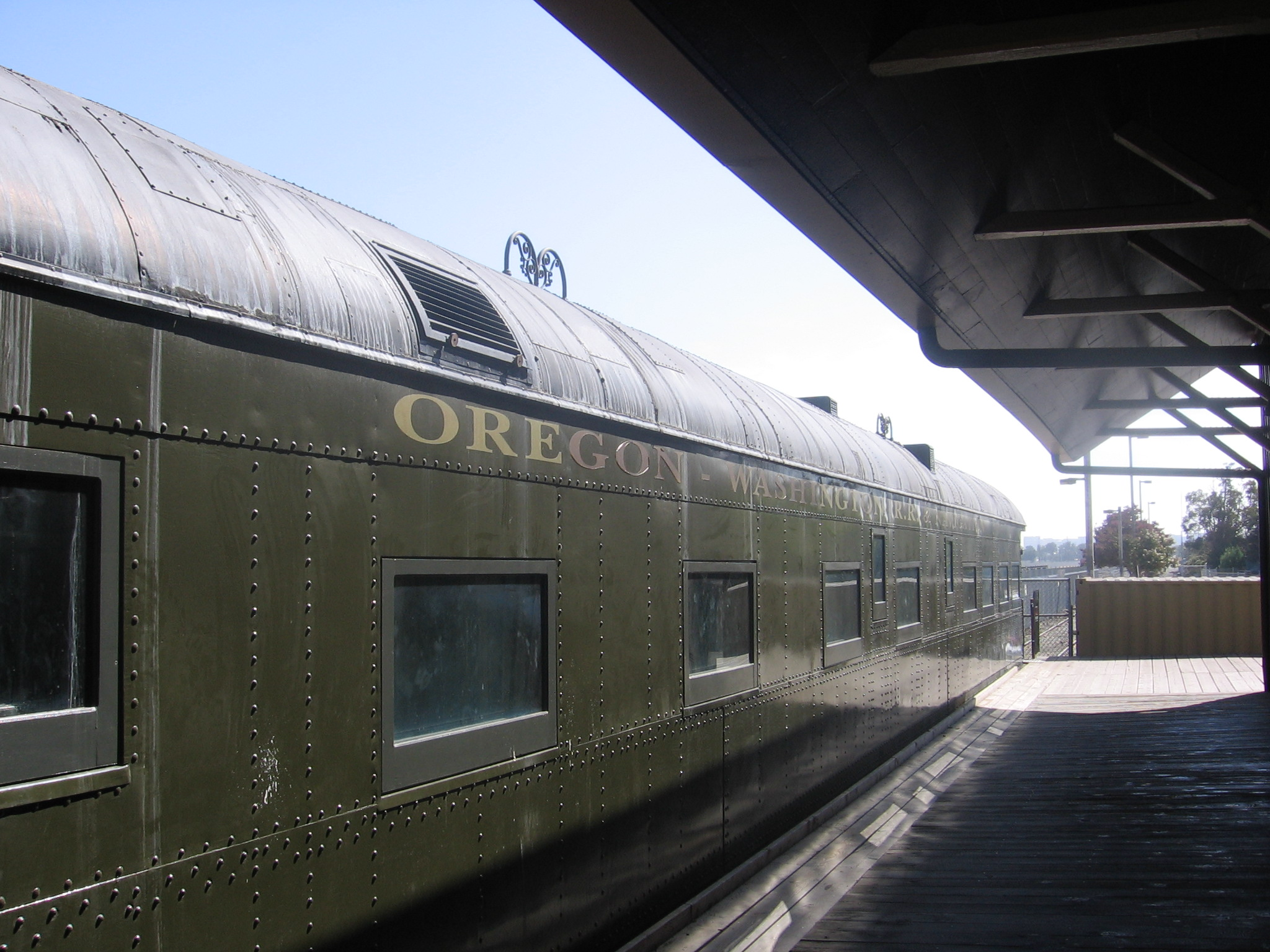
OWR&N car #84 being restored to its 1922 appearance in 2012 at the South Bay Historical Railroad Society in California.

- Oregon Steam Navigation Company was incorporated in 1862 in Portland. It operated steamships between San Francisco and ports along the Columbia River at Astoria, Portland, and The Dalles, serving the lumber and salmon fishing industries. The company built the railroad to serve the steamship operation. The Oregon Steam Navigation Company was sold to Oregon Railway and Navigation in 1880.
- Oregon Steam Navigation Company (of Washington) was incorporated in 1860 to operate via land along a portion of the Columbia River that was unnavigable by steamship because of the rapids. The railroad operated from The Dalles to Celilo Falls.
- Oregon Portage Railroad operated 4.5 miles (7.2 km) of track between Bonneville (on the Columbia River) and Cascade (Cascade Locks, Oregon) from 1858 to 1863. The railroad hauled primarily military and immigrant traffic. In 1862 the railroad was sold to the Oregon Railway and Navigation Company for $155,000.
- Ilwaco Railway and Navigation Company ran a narrow gauge rail line on the Long Beach Peninsula from Ilwaco in the south, to Nahcotta in the north, with steamboat connections at both ends. In 1900, the Oregon Railway and Navigation Company bought a controlling interest in the company.

== See also ==
- Albina Yard
- Colgate Hoyt
- Oregon Railroad and Navigation Company 197
- Idaho Northern - Absorbed into OR&N in 1910.
- Henry W. Corbett
