= Walla Walla and Columbia River Railroad =

The Walla Walla and Columbia River Railroad was a 3 ft (914 mm) narrow gauge railroad that operated a 46 miles (74 km) of track running east from Wallula, to Walla Walla, Washington, United States. It is also known as the Rawhide or Strap Iron Railroad. The nicknames come from the early days when the rail line used wooden rails. Strap iron was placed on top of the wooden rails to improve the longevity of the rails. The strap iron was secured in place by nails. Rawhide was used when a quick repair was needed to secure a snakehead.

In 1881, the railroad came under the control of the Oregon Railroad and Navigation Company (OR&N), and the narrow-gauge was converted to standard gauge. In 1910, the Walla Walla and Columbia River Railroad was consolidated into the OR&N.
