= Laura Grant-Herriot =

American politician

Laura Grant-Houston

Member of the Washington House of Representatives from the 16th district
- In office February 20, 2009 – November 3, 2009 Serving with Maureen Walsh
- Preceded by: William A. Grant
- Succeeded by: Terry Nealey

Personal details
- Party: Democratic
- Education: Eastern Washington University
- Occupation: Teacher

Laura Grant-Herriot is an American politician serving in the Washington House of Representatives for the 16th district from February 20, 2009, to November 3, 2009. She was appointed to the seat after her father, Bill Grant, died earlier in the session.
