= LaCrosse, Washington =

LaCrosse
- Town
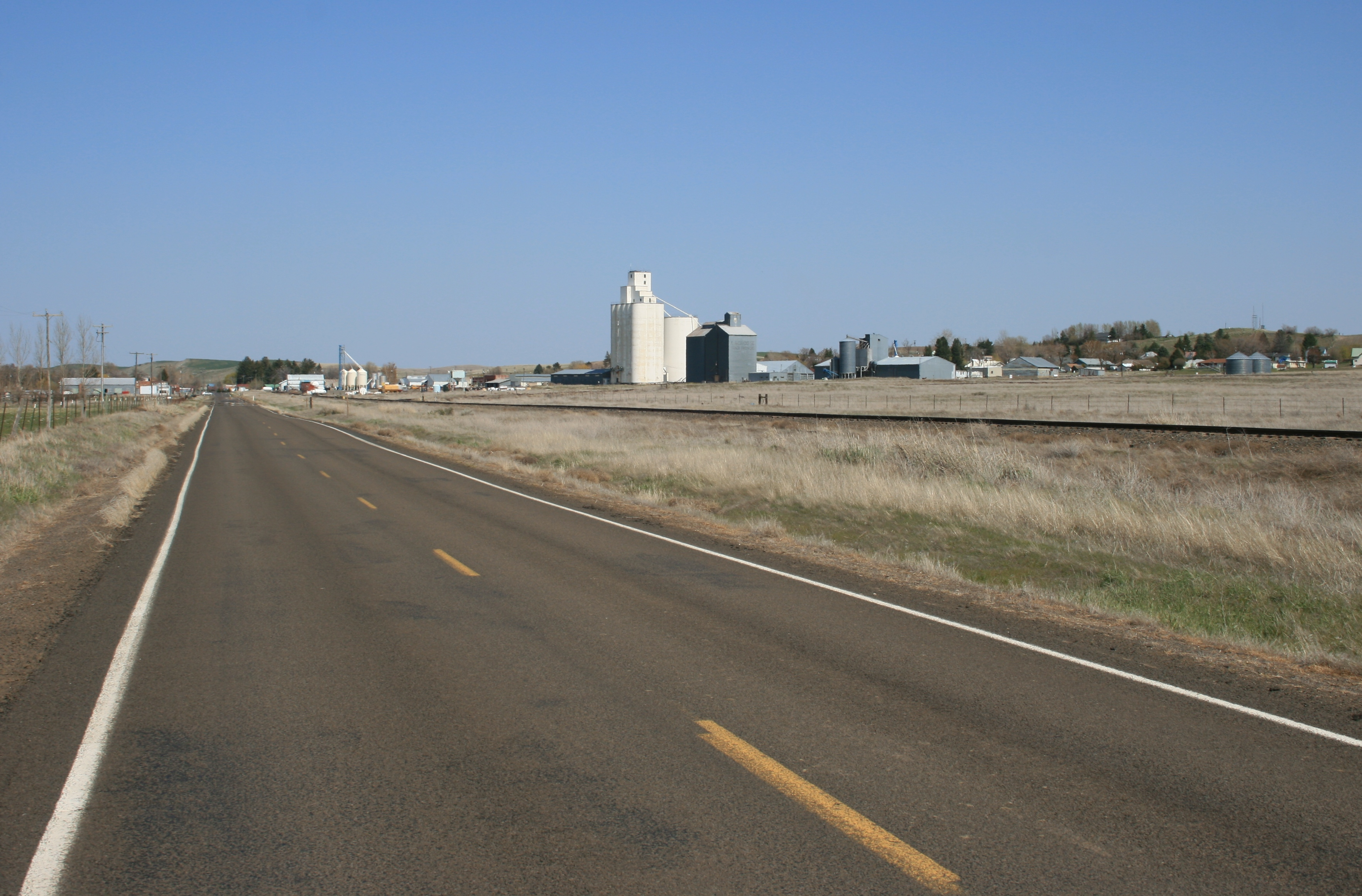
- Photo of LaCrosse taken from the south

- Location of LaCrosse, Washington
- Coordinates: 46°48′26″N 117°53′48″W
- Country: United States
- State: Washington
- County: Whitman
- Incorporated: February 19, 1917

Government
  - Type: Mayor–council
  - Mayor: Randy Camp

Area
  - Total: 0.85 sq mi (2.21 km^{2})
  - Land: 0.85 sq mi (2.21 km^{2})
  - Water: 0 sq mi (0.00 km^{2})
- Elevation: 1,483 ft (452 m)

Population (2020)
  - Total: 297
  - Estimate (2022): 294
  - Density: 373.3/sq mi (144.14/km^{2})
- Time zone: UTC–8 (Pacific (PST))
  - Summer (DST): UTC–7 (PDT)
- ZIP codes: 99136, 99143
- Area code: 509
- FIPS code: 53-36850
- GNIS feature ID: 2412853
- Sales tax: 7.9%
- Website: lacrossewa.us

LaCrosse is a town in Whitman County, Washington, United States. The population was 297 at the 2020 census.

== History ==
With the completion in 1888 of the Oregon Railroad and Navigation Company (O.R. & N) railroad line between Riparia and LaCrosse, George Dawson and his wife built a shack constructed from railroad ties. By 1889, LaCrosse had a population of 12. The first real store was constructed in 1899 by Tom Shobe. The town was named for LaCrosse, Wisconsin, to match with nearby Winona (named for the Minnesota town), by settlers from the Midwest.

LaCrosse was incorporated on February 19, 1917. Beginning in the 1980s, many farmers in the area surrounding LaCrosse opted to enroll in the federal Conservation Reserve Program and leave their lands unused for agriculture. The loss of business is cited as one factor in the town's population decline. A community benefit group formed in 2012 to fund revitalization projects and lure new businesses to replace closed services; the lone grocery store in LaCrosse closed in the 2000s and was followed by the town's hardware store a few years later. LaCrosse also enrolled in the state government's "Washington Main Street" program to advertise its historic downtown.

== Geography ==
According to the United States Census Bureau, the town has a total area of 0.78 square miles (2.02 km^{2}), all of it land.

=== Climate ===
According to the Köppen Climate Classification system, LaCrosse has a warm-summer humid continental climate (Dsb) if using the 0 C isotherm or warm-summer Mediterranean climate (Csb) if using the -3 C isotherm.

Climate data for La Crosse, Washington (1991–2020 normals, extremes 1901–2021)
Month	Jan	Feb	Mar	Apr	May	Jun	Jul	Aug	Sep	Oct	Nov	Dec	Year
Record high °F (°C)	64 (18)	70 (21)	80 (27)	95 (35)	100 (38)	113 (45)	110 (43)	113 (45)	104 (40)	92 (33)	76 (24)	66 (19)	113 (45)
Mean maximum °F (°C)	54.8 (12.7)	58.1 (14.5)	68.9 (20.5)	78.4 (25.8)	87.8 (31.0)	95.4 (35.2)	102.3 (39.1)	102.2 (39.0)	94.4 (34.7)	80.4 (26.9)	62.9 (17.2)	53.8 (12.1)	104.2 (40.1)
Mean daily maximum °F (°C)	38.8 (3.8)	44.8 (7.1)	53.7 (12.1)	61.9 (16.6)	71.5 (21.9)	79.4 (26.3)	90.0 (32.2)	88.8 (31.6)	78.5 (25.8)	62.7 (17.1)	47.3 (8.5)	37.9 (3.3)	62.9 (17.2)
Daily mean °F (°C)	32.3 (0.2)	35.8 (2.1)	42.3 (5.7)	48.7 (9.3)	56.7 (13.7)	63.6 (17.6)	71.3 (21.8)	70.3 (21.3)	61.2 (16.2)	49.3 (9.6)	38.6 (3.7)	31.2 (−0.4)	50.1 (10.1)
Mean daily minimum °F (°C)	25.8 (−3.4)	26.9 (−2.8)	30.8 (−0.7)	35.5 (1.9)	41.9 (5.5)	47.7 (8.7)	52.5 (11.4)	51.8 (11.0)	44.0 (6.7)	35.8 (2.1)	29.8 (−1.2)	24.5 (−4.2)	37.3 (2.9)
Mean minimum °F (°C)	6.7 (−14.1)	10.3 (−12.1)	16.9 (−8.4)	22.1 (−5.5)	27.9 (−2.3)	35.3 (1.8)	39.9 (4.4)	39.4 (4.1)	30.7 (−0.7)	19.1 (−7.2)	12.6 (−10.8)	6.6 (−14.1)	−3.1 (−19.5)
Record low °F (°C)	−30 (−34)	−24 (−31)	−6 (−21)	8 (−13)	19 (−7)	26 (−3)	30 (−1)	28 (−2)	15 (−9)	3 (−16)	−17 (−27)	−34 (−37)	−34 (−37)
Average precipitation inches (mm)	1.96 (50)	1.34 (34)	1.66 (42)	1.30 (33)	1.26 (32)	0.96 (24)	0.31 (7.9)	0.32 (8.1)	0.50 (13)	1.12 (28)	1.96 (50)	2.37 (60)	15.06 (383)
Average snowfall inches (cm)	4.1 (10)	2.2 (5.6)	0.8 (2.0)	0.1 (0.25)	0.0 (0.0)	0.0 (0.0)	0.0 (0.0)	0.0 (0.0)	0.0 (0.0)	0.0 (0.0)	1.8 (4.6)	8.1 (21)	17.1 (43)
Average precipitation days (≥ 0.01 in)	14.0	11.4	11.9	9.1	7.9	6.3	2.9	2.7	3.6	8.3	13.2	14.6	105.9
Average snowy days (≥ 0.1 in)	4.4	1.7	1.1	0.2	0.0	0.0	0.0	0.0	0.0	0.1	1.2	5.3	14.0
Source: NOAA

== Demographics ==
Historical population
Census	Pop.	Note	%±
1930	471		—
1940	475		0.8%
1950	457		−3.8%
1960	463		1.3%
1970	426		−8.0%
1980	373		−12.4%
1990	336		−9.9%
2000	380		13.1%
2010	313		−17.6%
2020	297		−5.1%
2022 (est.)	294	▼	−1.0%
U.S. Decennial Census; 2020 Census

=== 2010 census ===
As of the 2010 census, there were 313 people, 153 households, and 96 families residing in the town. The population density was 401.3 inhabitants per square mile (154.9/km^{2}). There were 181 housing units at an average density of 232.1 per square mile (89.6/km^{2}). The racial makeup of the town was 95.8% White, 0.3% African American, 0.6% Native American, 0.3% Asian, 0.3% from other races, and 2.6% from two or more races. Hispanic or Latino of any race were 0.3% of the population.

There were 153 households, of which 19.6% had children under the age of 18 living with them, 52.9% were married couples living together, 5.2% had a female householder with no husband present, 4.6% had a male householder with no wife present, and 37.3% were non-families. 33.3% of all households were made up of individuals, and 22.9% had someone living alone who was 65 years of age or older. The average household size was 2.05 and the average family size was 2.53.

The median age in the town was 51.8 years. 15.7% of residents were under the age of 18; 5.4% were between the ages of 18 and 24; 14.8% were from 25 to 44; 34.2% were from 45 to 64; and 30% were 65 years of age or older. The gender makeup of the town was 50.2% male and 49.8% female.

=== 2000 census ===
As of the 2000 census, there were 380 people, 164 households, and 105 families residing in the town. The population density was 1,101.6 people per square mile (431.5/km^{2}). There were 187 housing units at an average density of 542.1 per square mile (212.4/km^{2}). The racial makeup of the town was 93.42% White, 3.16% Native American, 0.26% Asian, 0.53% from other races, and 2.63% from two or more races. Hispanic or Latino of any race were 0.53% of the population.

There were 164 households, out of which 31.1% had children under the age of 18 living with them, 54.3% were married couples living together, 9.1% had a female householder with no husband present, and 35.4% were non-families. 32.9% of all households were made up of individuals, and 19.5% had someone living alone who was 65 years of age or older. The average household size was 2.32 and the average family size was 2.90.

In the town, the age distribution of the population shows 28.2% under the age of 18, 1.6% from 18 to 24, 26.6% from 25 to 44, 21.1% from 45 to 64, and 22.6% who were 65 years of age or older. The median age was 42 years. For every 100 females, there were 99.0 males. For every 100 females age 18 and over, there were 88.3 males.

The median income for a household in the town was $30,893, and the median income for a family was $40,833. Males had a median income of $30,972 versus $20,313 for females. The per capita income for the town was $16,656. About 2.1% of families and 5.9% of the population were below the poverty line, including 4.5% of those under age 18 and 6.0% of those age 65 or over.

== Notable groups and events ==
The La Crosse Arts and Beautification Council was created in 2005 with aspirations of renovating downtown LaCrosse while promoting the arts, local culture, and history of LaCrosse and the Palouse. Events have included the Valentine Fine Arts Night and the Spring Faire.

The La Crosse Gun Club holds an annual "Bacon & Crab Shooting" event at the end of January.
