= Darwin R. Nealey =

American politician from Washington

Member of the Washington House of Representatives from the 9th, Position 1 district
- In office January 3, 1983 – January 3, 1993
- Preceded by: Otto Amen
- Succeeded by: Larry Sheahan

Personal details
- Born: July 5, 1919 Washington, U.S.
- Died: January 21, 2002 (aged 82) LaCrosse, Washington, U.S.
- Party: Republican
- Spouse: Evelyn Nealey (died 2008)
- Relatives: Terry Nealey (son)

Darwin Ralph Nealey (July 5, 1919 – January 21, 2002) was an American politician in the state of Washington. He served in the Washington House of Representatives from 1983 to 1993 for district 9.

== Career ==
Nealey was a farmer in Washington.

On November 2, 1982, Nealey won the election and became a Republican member of Washington House of Representatives for District 9, Position 1. Nealey defeated Jim Timmons with 50.94% of the votes. On November 6, 1984, as an incumbent, Nealey won the election and continued serving as a member of Washington House of Representatives District 9, Position 1. Nealey defeated Jim Timmons with 56.29% of the votes. On November 4, 1986, as an incumbent, Nealey won the election and continued serving as a member of Washington House of Representatives District 9, Position 1. Nealey defeated Ken Casavant with 51.94% of the votes. On November 8, 1988, as an incumbent, Nealey won the election and continued serving as a member of Washington House of Representatives District 9, Position 1. Nealey defeated Victor Moore with 59.98% of the votes. On November 6, 1990, as an incumbent, Nealey won the election and continued serving as a member of Washington House of Representatives District 9, Position 1. Nealey defeated Victor Moore with 51.17% of the votes.

== Personal life ==
Nealey's second wife was Evelyn Moland Nealey (died 2008). Nealey had 2 sons, a daughter, and 2 step-sons from Evelyn. Nealey and his family live in LaCrosse, Washington.

On Jan. 21, 2002, Nealey died from a heart attack at his home in LaCrosse, Washington.
