= Wallula, Washington =

- CDP
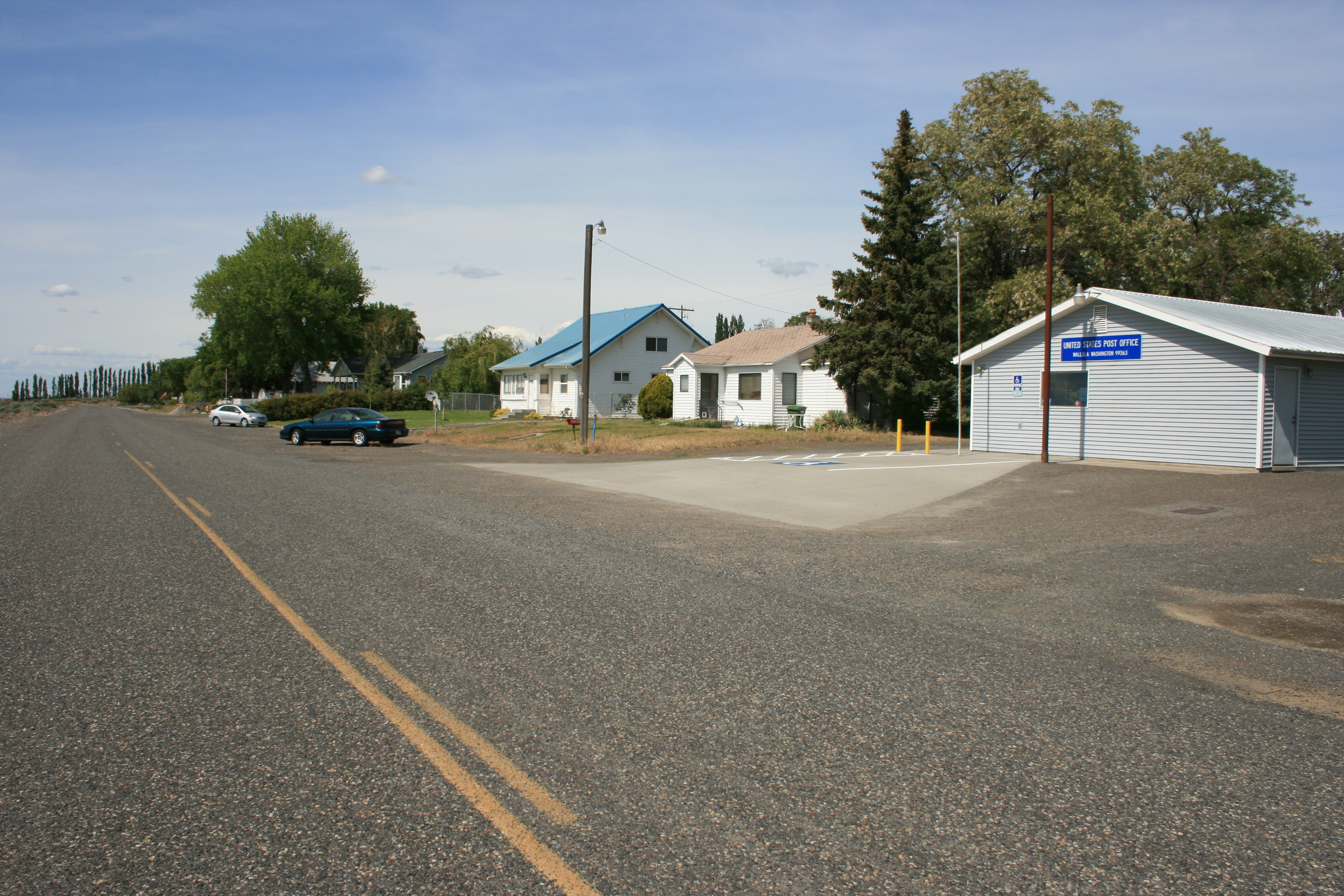
- Main Street in 2008

- Location of Wallula, Washington
- Coordinates: 46°05′05″N 118°54′20″W
- Country: United States
- State: Washington
- County: Walla Walla

Area
  - Total: 0.12 sq mi (0.3 km^{2})
  - Land: 0.12 sq mi (0.3 km^{2})
  - Water: 0 sq mi (0.0 km^{2})
- Elevation: 413 ft (126 m)

Population (2020)
  - Total: 140
  - Density: 1,200/sq mi (470/km^{2})
- Time zone: UTC-8 (Pacific (PST))
  - Summer (DST): UTC-7 (PDT)
- ZIP code: 99363
- Area code: 509
- FIPS code: 53-75985
- GNIS feature ID: 2409525

Wallula (/wəˈluːlʌ/) is a census-designated place (CDP) in Walla Walla County, Washington, United States. As of the 2020 census, Wallula had a population of 140.

== History ==
The Lewis and Clark Expedition reached this area April 27, 1806, on their return journey from the Pacific. The expedition spent three days at the village of Chief Yallept and his tribe of Walla Walla people (relatives of the Nez Perce), in the company of about a hundred Yakama people. Meriwether Lewis estimated the total of Native American people at around 550. There the expedition learned of an overland route to the Nez Perce homelands, which shortened their route by some eighty miles.

During David Thompson's 1811 voyage down the Columbia River, he camped at the Snake River confluence on July 9, 1811. There he erected a pole and notice claiming the country for Great Britain and stating the intention of the North West Company to build a trading post at the site.

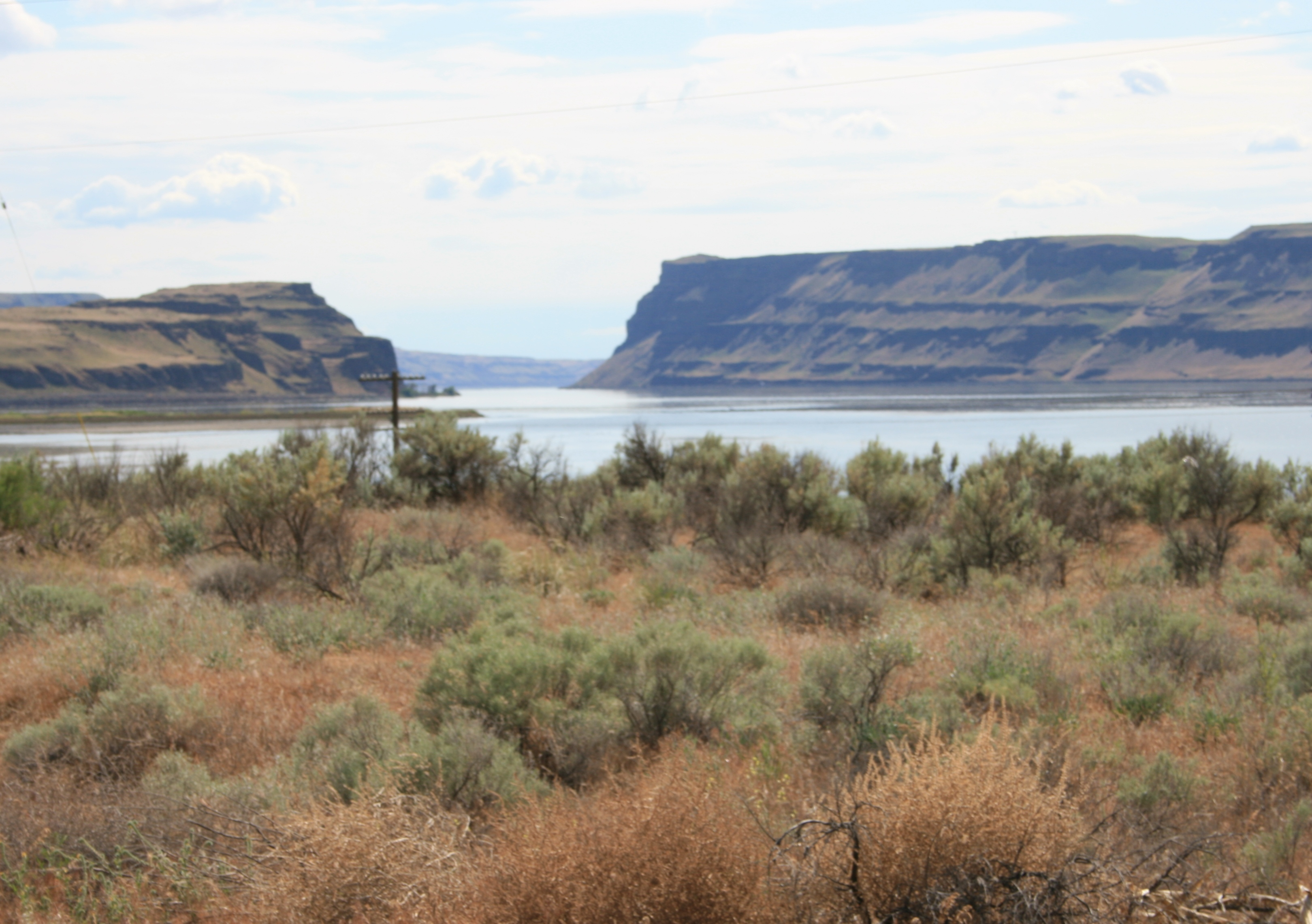
View of Wallula Gap from Main Street in 2008

European settlement of the area began in 1818, when the North West Company built Fort Nez Perce at the mouth of the Walla Walla River. The location was chosen to compete with the Hudson's Bay Company for the fur trade in the Pacific Northwest. That site was maintained until 1855.

The first railroad to connect Walla Walla with the Columbia River at Wallula was begun in 1871. The 30-mile (48 km) line, called the Walla Walla and Columbia River Railroad, was completed October 23, 1875. The line was later absorbed into the Northern Pacific Railroad. To save money, the original rails were wooden, with strap iron on the upper surface.

In 1883, the Northern Pacific completed its line from St. Paul, Minnesota, to present-day Wallula. It built a railroad bridge across the river to connect to the Oregon Railway and Navigation Company tracks along the south side of the Columbia River.

== Geography ==
According to the United States Census Bureau, the CDP has a total area of 0.1 square miles (0.26 km^{2}), all land.

The water gap in the Columbia River called Wallula Gap is near the settlement.

== Demographics ==
Historical population
Census	Pop.	Note	%±
2000	197		—
2010	179		−9.1%
2020	140		−21.8%
U.S. Decennial Census; 1970 1980 1990; 2000 2010

Wallula first appeared as a census designated place in the 2000 U.S. census.

=== Racial and ethnic composition ===
Wallula CDP, Washington – Racial and ethnic composition Note: the US Census treats Hispanic/Latino as an ethnic category. This table excludes Latinos from the racial categories and assigns them to a separate category. Hispanics/Latinos may be of any race.
Race / Ethnicity (NH = Non-Hispanic)	Pop 2000	Pop 2010	Pop 2020	% 2000	% 2010	% 2020
White alone (NH)	162	134	72	82.23%	74.86%	51.43%
Black or African American alone (NH)	0	0	0	0.00%	0.00%	0.00%
Native American or Alaska Native alone (NH)	2	0	1	1.02%	0.00%	0.71%
Asian alone (NH)	0	0	0	0.00%	0.00%	0.00%
Native Hawaiian or Pacific Islander alone (NH)	0	0	0	0.00%	0.00%	0.00%
Other race alone (NH)	0	0	0	0.00%	0.00%	0.00%
Mixed race or Multiracial (NH)	0	0	5	0.00%	0.00%	3.57%
Hispanic or Latino (any race)	33	45	62	16.75%	25.14%	44.29%
Total	197	179	140	100.00%	100.00%	100.00%

=== 2000 census ===
As of the census of 2000, there were 197 people, 60 households, and 48 families residing in the CDP. The population density was 1,978.5 people per square mile (763.9 people/km^{2}). There were 64 housing units at an average density of 642.8 units per square mile (248.2 units/km^{2}). The racial makeup of the CDP was 87.31% White, 1.02% Native American, 11.68% from other races. Hispanic or Latino of any race were 16.75% of the population.

There were 60 households, out of which 45.0% had children under the age of 18 living with them, 61.7% were married couples living together, 11.7% had a female householder with no husband present, and 20.0% were non-families. 8.3% of all households were made up of individuals, and 1.7% had someone living alone who was 65 years of age or older. The average household size was 3.28 and the average family size was 3.38.

In the CDP, the age distribution of the population shows 39.6% under the age of 18, 2.5% from 18 to 24, 26.9% from 25 to 44, 20.8% from 45 to 64, and 10.2% who were 65 years of age or older. The median age was 32 years. For every 100 females, there were 91.3 males. For every 100 females age 18 and over, there were 83.1 males.

The median income for a household in the CDP was $26,071, and the median income for a family was $26,071. Males had a median income of $26,000 versus $18,611 for females. The per capita income for the CDP was $3,213 in 2015. About 7.4% of families and 11.7% of the population were below the poverty line, including 18.7% of those under the age of eighteen and none of those 65 or over.

A paper mill of Packaging Corporation of America is in Wallula, originally a Boise Cascade facility constructed in 1958; to produce corrugated shipping containers. PCA acquired it in 2013 and it is part of their Boise Paper division. The only other businesses in the area are a U.S. Post Office and an auto wreck yard.
