= SS Oregon (1878) =

Coastal passenger/cargo ship

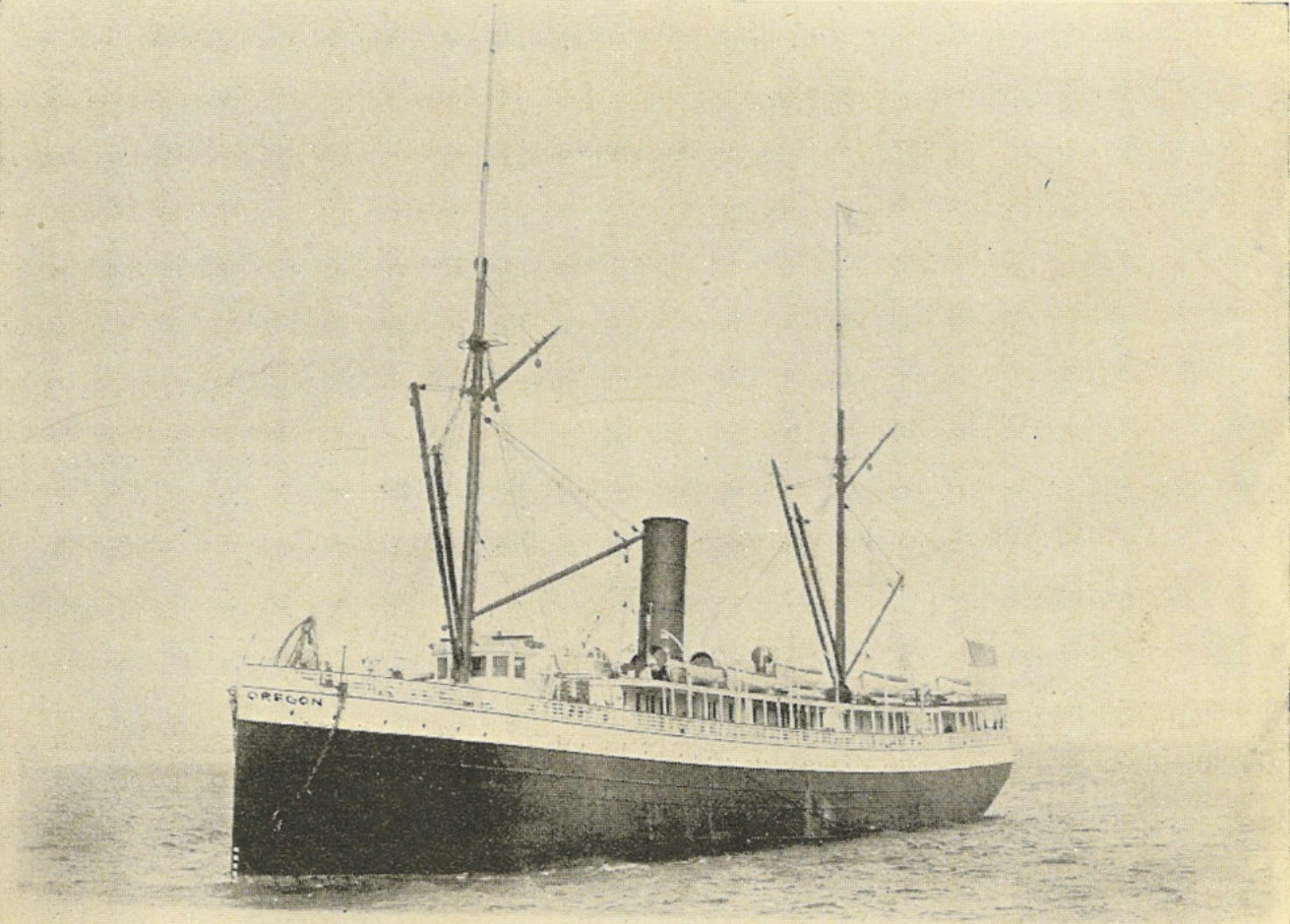
- SS Oregon in 1900

History

United States
- Name: Oregon
- Owner: Oregon Steamship Company (1878–1879); Oregon Railroad and Navigation Company (1879–1899); White Star Steamship Company (c.1902–1905)
- Route: San Francisco, California–Portland, Oregon (1878–?); Alaska–Puget Sound (?–1906)
- Builder: Delaware River Iron Ship Building and Engine Works, Chester, Pennsylvania
- Launched: February 1878
- In service: 1878
- Out of service: 1906
- Fate: Wrecked 13 September 1906
- Notes: Declared a total loss

General characteristics
- Type: Coastal passenger/cargo ship
- Tonnage: 2,335 tons
- Length: 283 ft (86 m)
- Beam: 37 ft (11 m)

SS Oregon was a coastal passenger/cargo ship constructed in Chester, Pennsylvania by the Delaware River Iron Ship Building and Engine Works in February 1878. Oregon was first employed on the Portland, Oregon to San Francisco, California route along the western coast of the United States. After a series of incidents that damaged the ship's hull and the use of concrete as ballast, the vessel was considered unsuitable for use as a passenger ship and operated solely as a cargo ship. Oregon was laid up from 1894 to 1899 when the vessel became re-certified as a passenger ship. In 1889, Oregon sank Clan McKenzie in a collision on the Columbia River which killed two people. Oregon then took up service to the District of Alaska where the vessel ran aground at Cape Hinchinbrook on September 13, 1906, and declared a total loss.

== Construction and career ==
Originally delivered to the Oregon Steamship Company in 1878, she was used on the Portland, Oregon to San Francisco, California route for many years. In 1879, the Oregon Railroad and Navigation Company became Oregon's new owners after purchasing the Oregon Steamship Company. Also included in this purchase were the steamships George W. Elder and City of Chester. While in O.R. & N service, Oregon served alongside Columbia, which made the first commercial use of Thomas Edison's incandescent light bulb. Like Oregon, Columbia was also built by John Roach & Sons in Chester, Pennsylvania. Over time, Oregon's hull became breached after a number of incidents. Furthermore, the hull had been weighted with concrete to the point where she was considered unsuitable for service as a passenger liner. After operating as a cargo ship, she was laid up in 1894 at Portland. In 1899, Oregon was re-qualified to carry passengers once more. She was sold by O.R. & N the same year. Despite this, she was viewed as a cursed ship by her crew. On 26 December 1889 she sank Clan McKenzie in a collision in snow on the Columbia River at Coffee Rock 47 miles (76 km) above Astoria, Oregon. Two of Clan McKenzie's crew were killed and one other injured. Oregon's bow was damaged and she drifted ashore. Oregon was later pulled off.

The steamship appears as docked In Alaska at the time for the 1900 census.

Oregon was owned by the White Star Steamship Company (not to be confused with the White Star Line) from around 1902 to 1905. Around this time, Oregon was operating between Alaska and Puget Sound.

On 13 September 1906, Oregon ran aground on the rocky shoreline of Cape Hinchinbrook, Alaska. At the time, there was no active lighthouse at Cape Hinchinbrook, although one was under construction. It is unknown whether poor navigation or reduced visibility caused the wreck. Shortly after the collision, the bottom of the vessel tore open and water began flooding the ship. Oregon became stuck on the rocks without any barrier from the open sea. After crew members began boarding the lifeboats without orders, Captain Horace E. Soule threatened to shoot any man attempting to steal one. This led to the crew obeying all further orders and a small party was sent off in a lifeboat to report the disaster in Valdez, Alaska. When the report of Oregon's wreck reached Valdez, many ships set out to rescue the passengers and crew. Remarkably, all 110 remaining people on board Oregon were rescued by the revenue cutter USRC Columbine. Oregon however, was reported as a total loss.
