= Terry Nealey =

American politician from Washington

Member of the Washington House of Representatives from the 16th district
- In office November 3, 2009 – January 14, 2019
- Preceded by: Laura Grant-Herriot
- Succeeded by: Skyler Rude

Personal details
- Born: Terry Robert Nealey; January 30, 1947 (age 79) Walla Walla, Washington, U.S.
- Party: Republican
- Parent: Darwin R. Nealey (father)
- Education: Washington State University (BA); Gonzaga University School of Law (JD)

Terry Robert Nealey (born January 30, 1947) is an American politician of the Republican Party. He is a former member of the Washington House of Representatives, representing the 16th district from 2009 to 2019. He was initially elected in a special election in November 2009.

In March 2018, Nealey announced he would not seek re-election in 2018 and would retire from the legislature.

== Awards ==
- 2014 Guardians of Small Business award. Presented by NFIB.

== Personal life ==
Nealey's wife is Janice Nealey. They have two children. Nealey and his family live in Dayton, Washington.
