= Winona, Washington =

Unincorporated community in Washington, United States

- Unincorporated community
- Location within Washington (state)
- Coordinates: 46°56′44.58″N 117°48′1.76″W
- Country: United States
- State: Washington
- County: Whitman
- Time zone: UTC-8 (Pacific (PST))
  - Summer (DST): UTC-7 (PDT)
- Area code: 509
- GNIS feature ID: 1509598

Winona is an unincorporated community in Whitman County, Washington, United States. Winonia is 5.20 miles (8.37 km) east of Endicott. Winona had a post office from 1891 to 1973.
