= Pinsly Railroad Company =

Pinsly Railroad Company may refer to:

- Pinsly Railroad Company (1938–2023), American short line railroad holding company (1938–2023)
- Pinsly Railroad Company (2024), railroad company
