= Grenada station =

Former train station in Mississippi, US

Grenada, MS
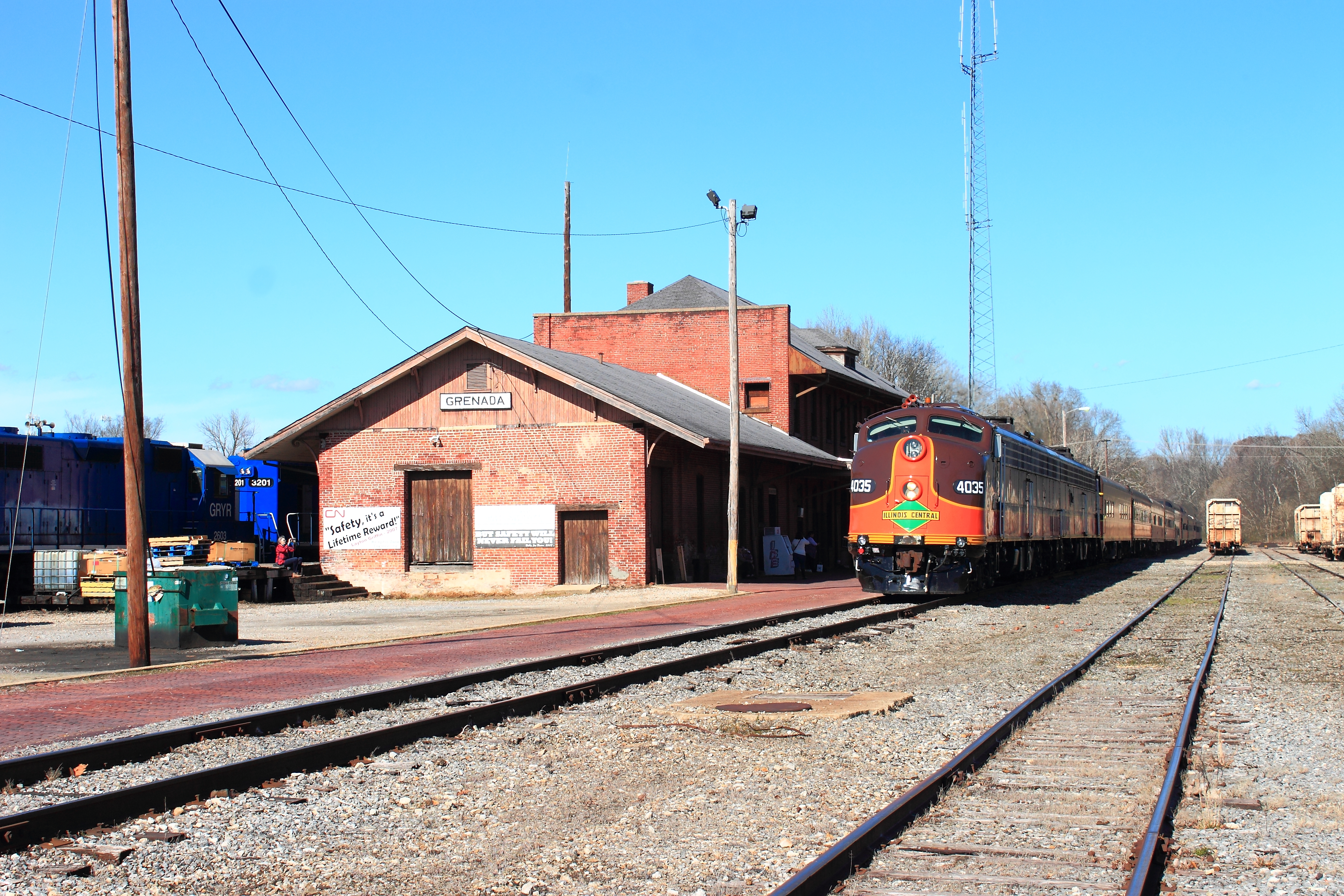
- Grenada station in January 2016

General information
- Location: 643 1st Street; Grenada, Mississippi
- Coordinates: 33°46′59″N 89°47′52″W

History
- Opened: September 1859
- Closed: September 10, 1995
- Rebuilt: c. 1870s, c. 1886, 1907, c. 1928

Services
Preceding station	Amtrak	Following station
Winona toward New Orleans	City of New Orleans	Batesville toward Chicago
Preceding station	Illinois Central Railroad	Following station
Winona toward New Orleans	Main Line	Oakland toward Chicago
Terminus	Grenada – Fulton	West Virginia Junction toward Fulton
- Illinois Central Depot
- U.S. National Register of Historic Places
- NRHP reference No.: 87002308
- Added to NRHP: April 7, 1988
Location

Grenada station is a former railroad station in Grenada, Mississippi. It was jointly constructed by the Mississippi Central and Tennessee and Mississippi Railroad in 1870. The two previous depots were burned during the United States Civil War. The second story and sheds were added by the Illinois Central Railroad in 1926. The building is now used for the Grenada Railroad as its headquarters.

== History ==
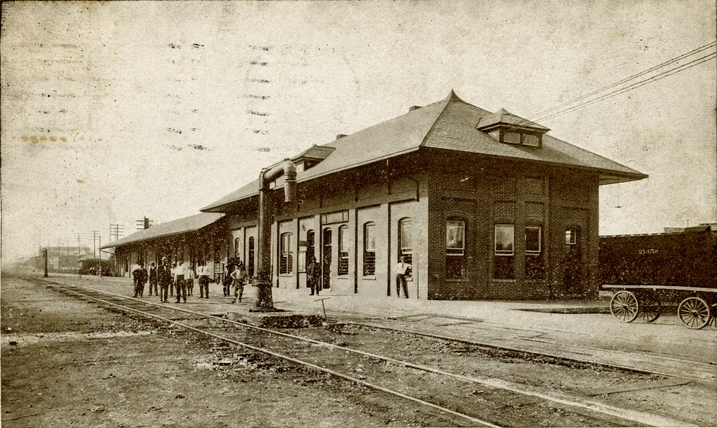
The depot c. 1921

The Mississippi Central Railroad reached Grenada in September 1859, with the Mississippi and Tennessee Railroad following in 1861. The first depot on the site was destroyed by the Union army in 1863 and the second depot in 1865 during the United States Civil War. Following the end of the war, the station was rebuilt several times to handle increasing traffic. By 1921, a total of 20 trains of both the Illinois Central Railroad and Yazoo and Mississippi Valley Railroad stopped at Grenada daily. The modern station was built around 1928. It was added to the National Register of Historic Places on April 7, 1988. Amtrak served the station with the City of New Orleans until September 10, 1995, when the train was rerouted. Restoration work under the owners of the building, Gulf & Atlantic Railways, began in 2024 and was completed in 2025.
