= CPIX =

CPIX may refer to:

- Consumer price index (South Africa)
- Network Processing Forum, previously known as the Common Programming Interface Forum
- Continental Polymers, Inc., Railway reporting mark CPIX
- Cumberland Pharmaceuticals, Inc., NASDAQ
- Content Protection Information eXchange, specification by DASH-IF to exchange keys and DRM information
