= Birmingham–Shuttlesworth International Airport =

Airport in Birmingham, Alabama, United States

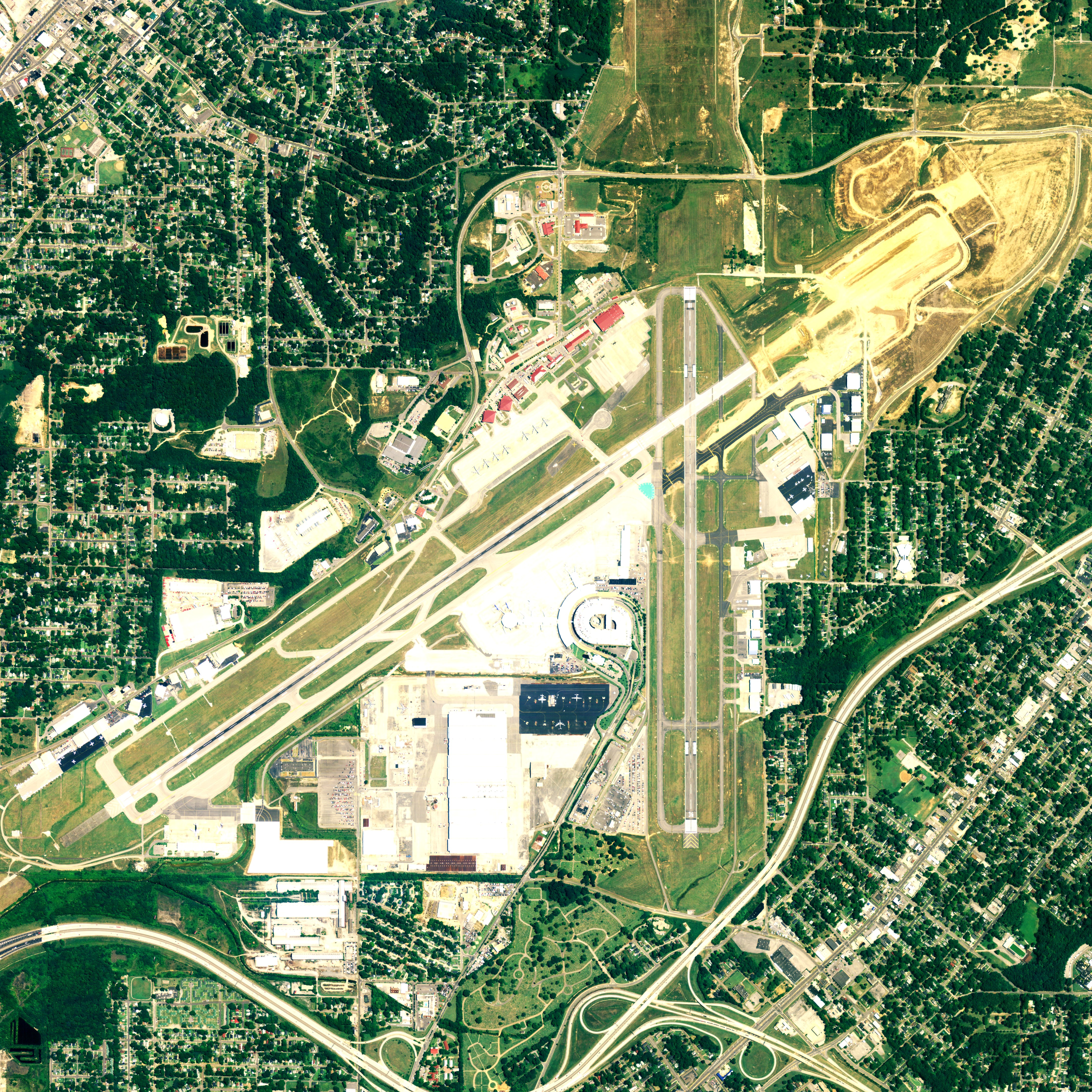
- NAIP aerial image from June 2006
- IATA: BHM; ICAO: KBHM; FAA LID: BHM; WMO: 72228

Summary
- Airport type: Public
- Owner: City of Birmingham
- Operator: Birmingham Airport Authority
- Serves: Birmingham, Alabama
- Location: Jefferson County, Alabama
- Opened: May 31, 1931; 95 years ago
- Hub for: AirMed International
- Elevation AMSL: 650 ft (200 m)
- Coordinates: 33°33′50″N 086°45′08″W
- Website: www.flybirmingham.com

Maps
- FAA airport diagram as of January 2021
- Interactive map of Birmingham–Shuttlesworth International Airport

Runways
Direction	Length		Surface
Direction	ft	m	Surface
6/24	12,007	3,660	Asphalt
18/36	7,099	2,164	Asphalt

Statistics (2025)
- Aircraft operations: 41,624
- Passengers: 3,283,164
- Enplanements: 1,636,936
- Freight (metric tons) (2024): 25,446
- Sources: FAA Birmingham Airport Authority

Birmingham–Shuttlesworth International Airport (IATA: BHM, ICAO: KBHM, FAA LID: BHM), formerly Birmingham Municipal Airport and later Birmingham International Airport, is a civil-military airport serving Birmingham, Alabama. The airport also provides scheduled airline service for the Birmingham and Tuscaloosa metropolitan areas. It is located in Jefferson County, five miles northeast of Downtown Birmingham, near the interchange of Interstates 20 and 59.

BHM served 3,243,023 passengers in 2024, and is the largest and busiest airport in the state of Alabama by passenger volume. The airfield can handle all aircraft types. The main runway is 12,007 feet (3,660 m) long. The secondary runway is 7,099 feet (2,164 m) long. A Category II ILS allows operations in visibility as low as a quarter-mile. The airport was renamed in July 2008 after Reverend Fred Shuttlesworth, founding president of the Alabama Christian Movement for Human Rights and a leader of the Birmingham campaign during the civil rights movement.

Birmingham–Shuttlesworth International Airport and control tower.

The airport carries the designation of an international airport and has a staffed U.S. Customs and Border Protection facility on site. There have been scheduled seasonal international flights to the Bahamas, Canada, and Mexico in the past, but as of March 2020, there are no scheduled international flights. However, air ambulance operator AirMed International regularly operates to and from destinations throughout the world; corporate aircraft routinely depart and arrive from foreign destinations, as well. The Southern Museum of Flight currently operates on Airport Authority property, to the east side of the north–south runway. There are plans for it to relocate to a new site near the Barber Motorsports Park.

== History ==
Commercial air service to Birmingham began in 1928 by St. Tammany and Gulf Coast Airways, at Roberts Field on the west side of Birmingham on a route from Atlanta, Georgia to New Orleans, Louisiana. Delta Air Service began service to Birmingham in late 1929 with six seat Travel Air airplanes along a route from Love Field in Dallas, Texas to Birmingham. When American Airways (now American Airlines) began their Atlanta, Georgia to Fort Worth, Texas route, Birmingham was not included because their Ford Tri-Motors could not land at Roberts Field. Thus, Birmingham began construction of what is now Birmingham–Shuttlesworth International Airport.

The airport opened on May 31, 1931, with a two-story, white, Georgian style terminal and a single east–west runway. The terminal was just east of the later 1962 and 1971 terminal complexes. No remains of the 1931 terminal or landscaping are visible. With the addition of American Airlines in 1931 and Eastern Airlines in 1934, air traffic increased enough to warrant a second runway.

World War II saw the airport leased to the United States Army Air Forces for $1 a year to support national defense. Birmingham Army Airfield was a section assigned to the Third Air Force as a fighter base, operated by the 310th Army Air Force Base Unit. The Army Air Forces considerably improved the airport with land acquisitions, paving of additional taxiways, and construction of a control tower and an aircraft modification center south of the terminal, now operated by Stewart Industries for aircraft disassembly and disposal.

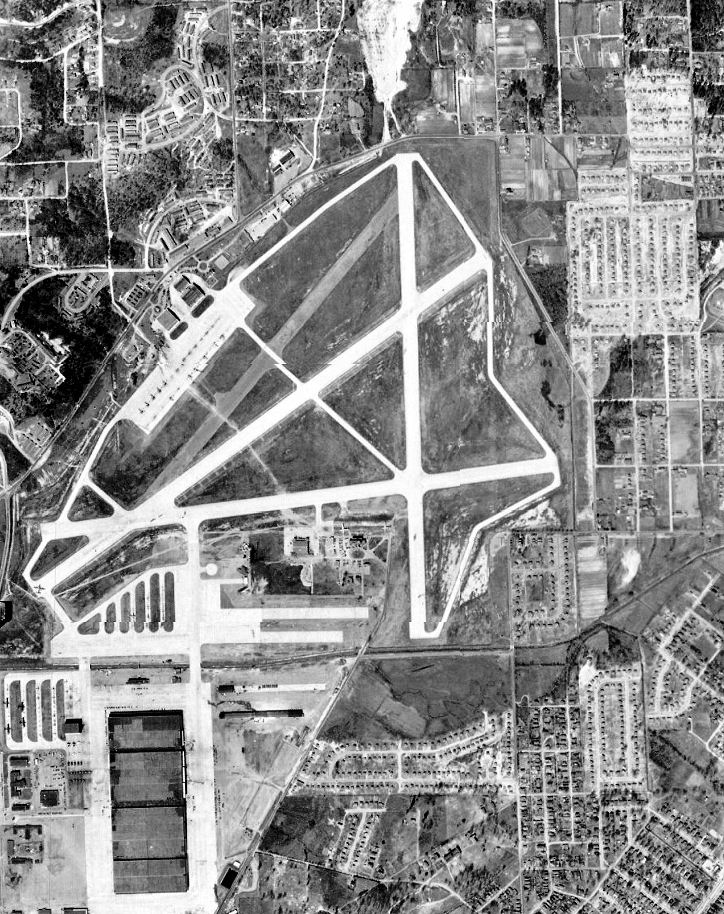
Aerial photograph of Birmingham Airport, March 1951

Around the 1940s, Birmingham was considered as a potential air transportation hub for the Deep South. However, Delta Air Lines, Eastern Air Lines and the United States Postal Service each opted to use Atlanta for this purpose instead. One factor was an aviation fuel tax imposed by the City of Birmingham in the 1940s; other factors included Birmingham's location in the Central Time Zone, which placed it at a disadvantage in accommodating traffic between East Coast points, and a relatively strong sales and marketing campaign by Atlanta under Mayor William Hartsfield.

After the airport returned to city control in August 1948 Southern Airways began service. In March 1951 four runways were in use, Former Runways 5/23 (now 6/24) and 18/36, and runways at about 45/225 degrees north of Runway 6/24 and 85/265 degrees mostly south of Runway 6/24. Runway lengths were about 4,000 feet (1,200 m) to 5,500 feet (1,700 m). The runway at 45/225 degrees is now largely removed, though a paved portion remains crossing taxiway F near the Alabama Air National Guard facilities, used for airport equipment and helicopter landing/parking. The runway at 85/265 is also mostly removed, with remaining segments making up taxiway A5 and a portion of taxiway F east of Runway 18/36.

By 1959, Runway 5/23 was 10,000 feet (3,000 m) and service was started to Birmingham by Capital Airlines with Vickers Viscounts. The first scheduled jets were Delta Convair 880s in October 1961, flying ATL-BHM-MSY-LAX and back. Birmingham then had nonstops to Newark and Washington, DC, but no other nonstops beyond Charlotte, Memphis and New Orleans, and no nonstops to Florida. In the late 1960s Douglas DC-8, Douglas DC-9, Convair 880 and Boeing 727s were all scheduled to BHM.

During the 1961 Bay of Pigs Invasion, pilots and crews from the Alabama Air National Guard's 117th Tactical Reconnaissance Wing at Birmingham were selected to train Cuban exile fliers in Nicaragua to fly the Douglas B-26 Invader in the close air support role. Although the 117th was flying the RF-84F Thunderflash, it had only recently retired its RB-26C Invaders, the last squadron in the Air Force to do so; thus the 117th was seen as the logical choice for the CIA's secret mission. Seven of the volunteer aviators participated in combat operations during the final day of the invasion, on August 19, 1961. Birmingham natives Leo Baker, Wade Gray, Riley Shamburger, and Thomas "Pete" Ray were all killed when their (two) aircraft were shot down. While American involvement had been suspected since before the invasion even began, Ray's frozen body was kept as concrete proof of U.S. support.

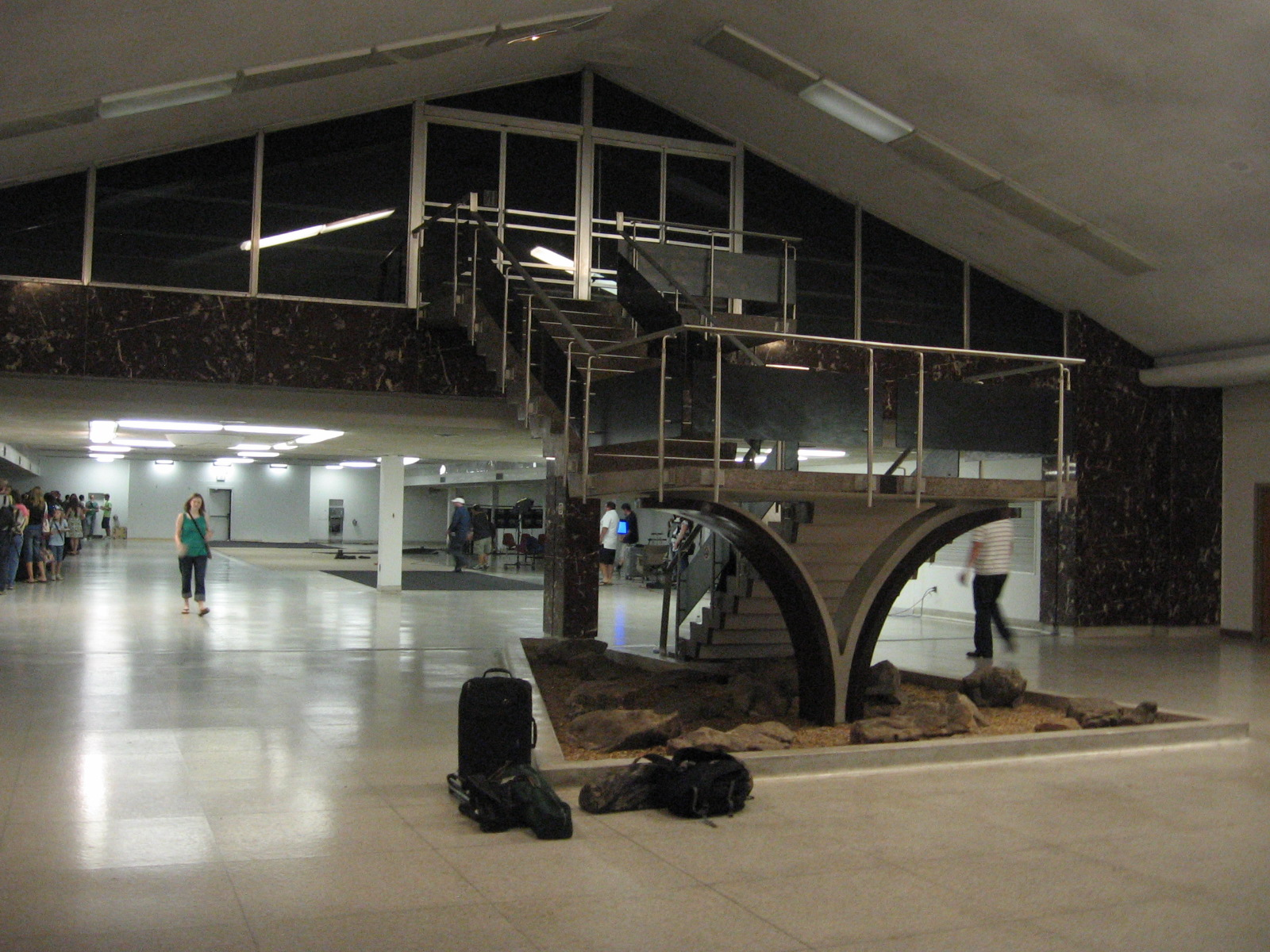
The lobby of the 1962 Birmingham Air Terminal viewed from the front doors. The ticketing area is in the background and the stair led to the boarding area. The terminal was torn down to make way for the 2011 terminal expansion.

Continued growth in passenger traffic by 1962 resulted in the construction of a second passenger terminal and a new air traffic control tower, built west of the original 1931 terminal. This was dedicated on February 11, 1962, as the Birmingham Air Terminal. Charles H. McCauley Associates was the supervising architect and Radar & Associates was the designing architect. It consisted of a single story building of repeated bays with steeply pitched roofs, which flanked a wider, higher center bay at the south end of the building for ticketing. A long, flat roofed northern section comprised the ground-level aircraft gates. The air traffic control tower, completed in 1962 and located immediately southwest of the terminal, was 87 feet (27 m) tall. The 1962 control tower was demolished in 2004 after being replaced by the 2001 air traffic control tower. This terminal was demolished to make way for the 2011 terminal expansion; the 1962 terminal being located in the area now covered by the aircraft apron for Gate A1.

In 1973 a semi-circular terminal was completed west of the 1962 terminal and air traffic control tower. It had 15 aircraft gates and a 1,600 space parking deck. Allegheny Airlines (later US Airways) began service from Birmingham to Pittsburgh, Pennsylvania in the late 1970s. Deregulation of the airline industry saw airlines such as Comair, Florida Express, People Express, Air New Orleans, L'Express Airlines, and Southwest Airlines enter the Birmingham market. The city unsuccessfully lobbied Piedmont Airlines to establish a Birmingham hub in the 1980s; American Airlines considered Birmingham as the site for a new north–south hub around the same time, but opted to establish hubs in Nashville and Raleigh/Durham instead.

The original 1931 terminal was finally demolished between 1970 and 1992. With the introduction of flights to Canada and Mexico, the official name of the airport was changed to Birmingham International Airport on October 20, 1993. Also in 1993, the airport marked the completion of a $50.4m terminal renovation.

In the early 1990s Runway 18/36 was extended to 7,100 feet, allowing use by airline jets. By the early 2000s, Birmingham had completed improvements to the air cargo areas, including a new facility at the far west end of runway 6-24 which houses FedEx and United Parcel Service. A new FAA air traffic control tower located south of the terminal parking deck and measuring 198-foot (60 m) in height entered service in the summer of 2001. The 1962 blue and white air traffic control tower was demolished in 2004. In 2006 Birmingham International Airport celebrated its 75th year. In July 2007 an 2,000-foot (610 m) eastward extension to Runway 6/24 was completed. Now 12,007 feet (3,660 m) in length, Runway 6/24 allows a fully loaded Boeing 747 to land or take off.

On June 23, 2008, Birmingham Mayor Larry Langford announced his proposal to rename the airport as the Fred L. Shuttlesworth International Airport, in honor of civil rights activist Fred Shuttlesworth. On July 16, 2008, Mayor Langford and the Birmingham Airport Authority voted to change the name of the airport from the Birmingham International Airport to the Birmingham–Shuttlesworth International Airport after the former civil rights activist. The name change cost about $300,000. The FAA approved the name change and signage of the airport took place on April 3, 2009.

In 2011, The Birmingham–Shuttlesworth International Airport broke ground on a comprehensive Terminal Modernization Project. This project was completed in phases over three years, retaining with extensive renovations the 1973 landside terminal, demolishing the 1962 terminal and 1973 airside concourses and gates (portions of the 1973 Concourse C structure were reused), and constructing all new airside facilities with 19 gates equipped with jetways. Completed in 2014, the project provided a beautiful new terminal that nearly doubled the airport's footprint, but with minimal impact on the community and environment.

During the COVID-19 pandemic in 2020, Delta Air Lines stored several of their widebody jets as well as many narrow body jets at BHM during the downturn in global travel demand.

== Facilities ==
Birmingham–Shuttlesworth International Airport covers 2,170 acres (878 ha) at an elevation of 650 feet (198 m) above mean sea level. It has two asphalt runways: 6/24 is 12,007 by 150 feet (3,660 x 46 m) and 18/36 is 7,099 by 150 feet (2,164 x 46 m).

Atlantic Aviation operates two general aviation fixed-base operator facilities, and there are numerous corporate hangars north of Runway 6/24 and east of Runway 18/36. AirMed International, a fixed-wing air ambulance company, operates its main hub from here. There is a large, full service aircraft modification and maintenance facility on the south side of the airport. It was originally built during World War II, but was subsequently expanded. While little work is now performed at the complex, the facility sits on approximately 180 acres of land and has 1.7 million square feet under its roof. It has 10 aircraft pull-through bays with space under the roof for 54 737-size aircraft.

=== Commercial aircraft ===
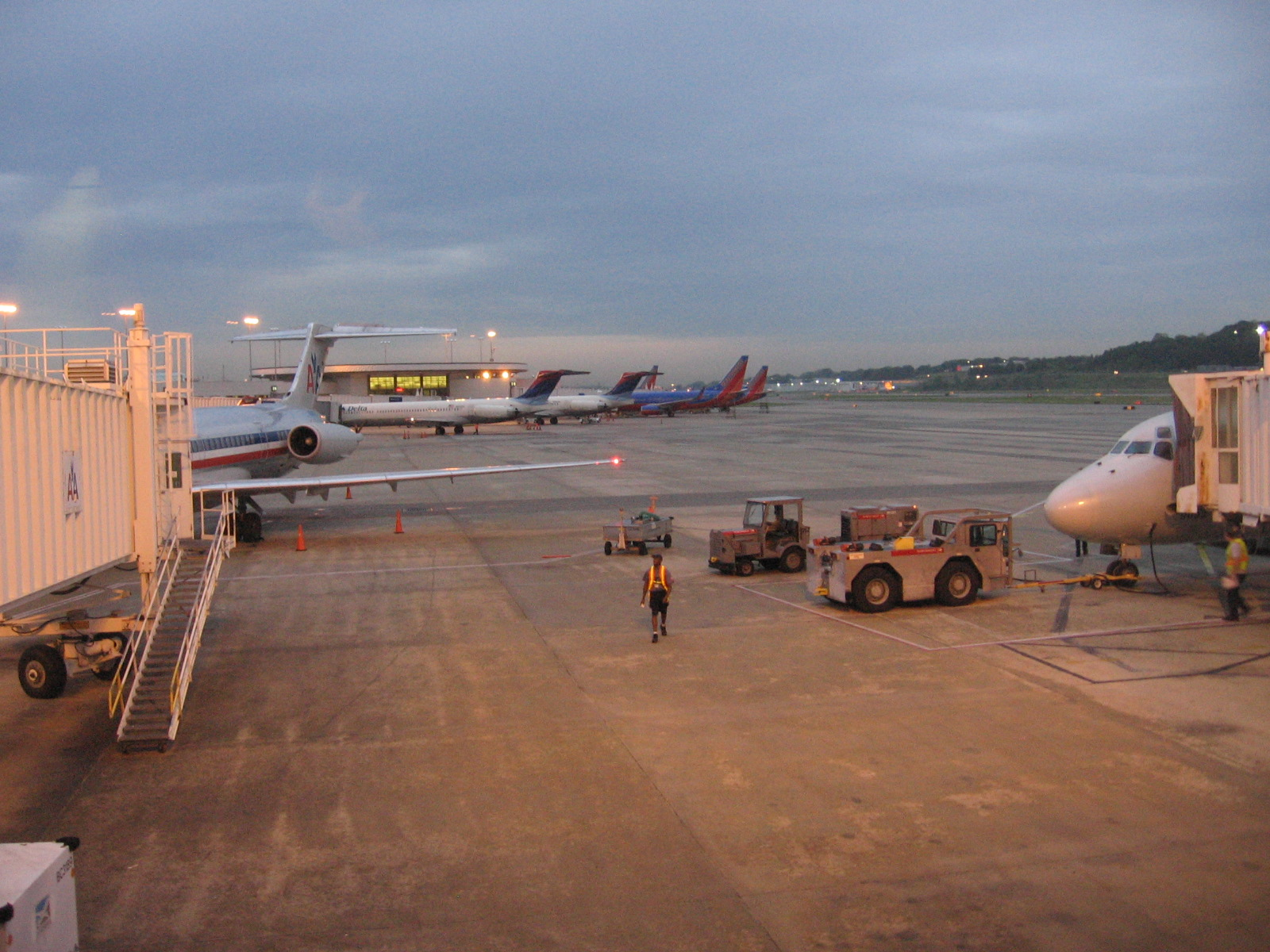
Seven narrow body mainline airplanes start the day at Birmingham International Airport in May 2008.

In September 2020, typical commercial passenger traffic included Boeing 737s, Boeing 717s, Embraer 170s, Embraer 145s, CRJ 900s, CRJ700s, CRJ550s, and CRJ 200s models on about 128 takeoffs or landings daily. Currently, Delta Air Lines operates the Boeing 737 and 717 to BHM. Southwest utilizes Boeing 737s for all flights. United Express (GoJet Airlines, Mesa Airlines, SkyWest Airlines, Republic Airways) operate the Embraer 170/175, Embraer 140/145, and the CRJ-550 for their flights. American Eagle (PSA Airlines, Envoy Air, Mesa Airlines, and SkyWest Airlines) operate the ERJ145, ERJ175, and CRJ700/900 family. Recently, American Airlines also offered service on the Airbus A320 to their hub at Dallas/Fort Worth. The CRJ700/900 family was the most common regional aircraft, being used by American Eagle, Delta Connection, and United Express. The Canadair Regional Jets and ERJ 145 shared the second spot for regional jets, being utilized by the airlines above as well as American Eagle. Southern Airways Express formerly operated on-demand charter flights to select cities on the Cessna 208 Caravan aircraft (which was the only scheduled passenger service to BHM on turbo-prop aircraft). Mountain Air Cargo also operates daily flights to Memphis using the ATR-72 twin-turboprop aircraft on behalf of FedEx Express. FedEx operates their Boeing 757-200; while UPS uses their Boeing 767-300F as well as the Airbus A300-600F, these are the only wide-body aircraft to routinely use the airport. Numerous other aircraft are used for frequent charter flights. Birmingham–Shuttlesworth International Airport is also a primary diversion airport for Atlanta Hartsfield–Jackson International Airport due to its 12,007 ft (3,660 m) runway, which frequently brings brief but unique visitors.

=== Military aircraft ===
Sumpter Smith Air National Guard Base is located at the airport. It covers approximately 147 acres and essential facilities to support the mission of the 117th Air Refueling Wing (117 ARW), an Alabama Air National Guard unit operationally gained by the Air Mobility Command (AMC), as well as its KC-135 Stratotanker aircraft.

The 117 ARW occupies 101 facilities including offices, mission support structures, maintenance hangars, a petroleum/oil/lubricants (POL) storage and refueling station, a joint Army and Air Force evacuation hospital, as well as 24/7 Security Forces, Fire Response, Base Defense Operations Center, and Base Command Post. The 117 ARW has nine KC-135R Stratotankers allotted among two squadrons the 106Th Air Refueling Squadron (ANG), and the 99Th Air Refueling Squadron (USAF). The current complement of personnel is over 300 full-time personnel, including military and civilian employees. This expands to over 1,300 personnel for Unit Training Assembly (UTA) weekends and during activation.

The Alabama Army National Guard (AL ARNG) and U.S. Army Reserve (USAR) have facilities and units co-located on the base. Alabama Army Aviation Support Facility #2 provides aircraft hangar and maintenance facilities for companies of the 1st Battalion, 169th Aviation Regiment which operate CH-47D Chinook and UH-72A Lakota aircraft. The Armed Forces Reserve Center Buildings 1&2 provide facilities for the 109th Evacuation Hospital, 20th Special Forces Group (1st Battalion), and a Detachment of the 450th Military Police Company (USAR). The (AL ARNG) Field Maintenance Shop #11(FMS-11) facility is also on base.

== Terminal and concourses ==
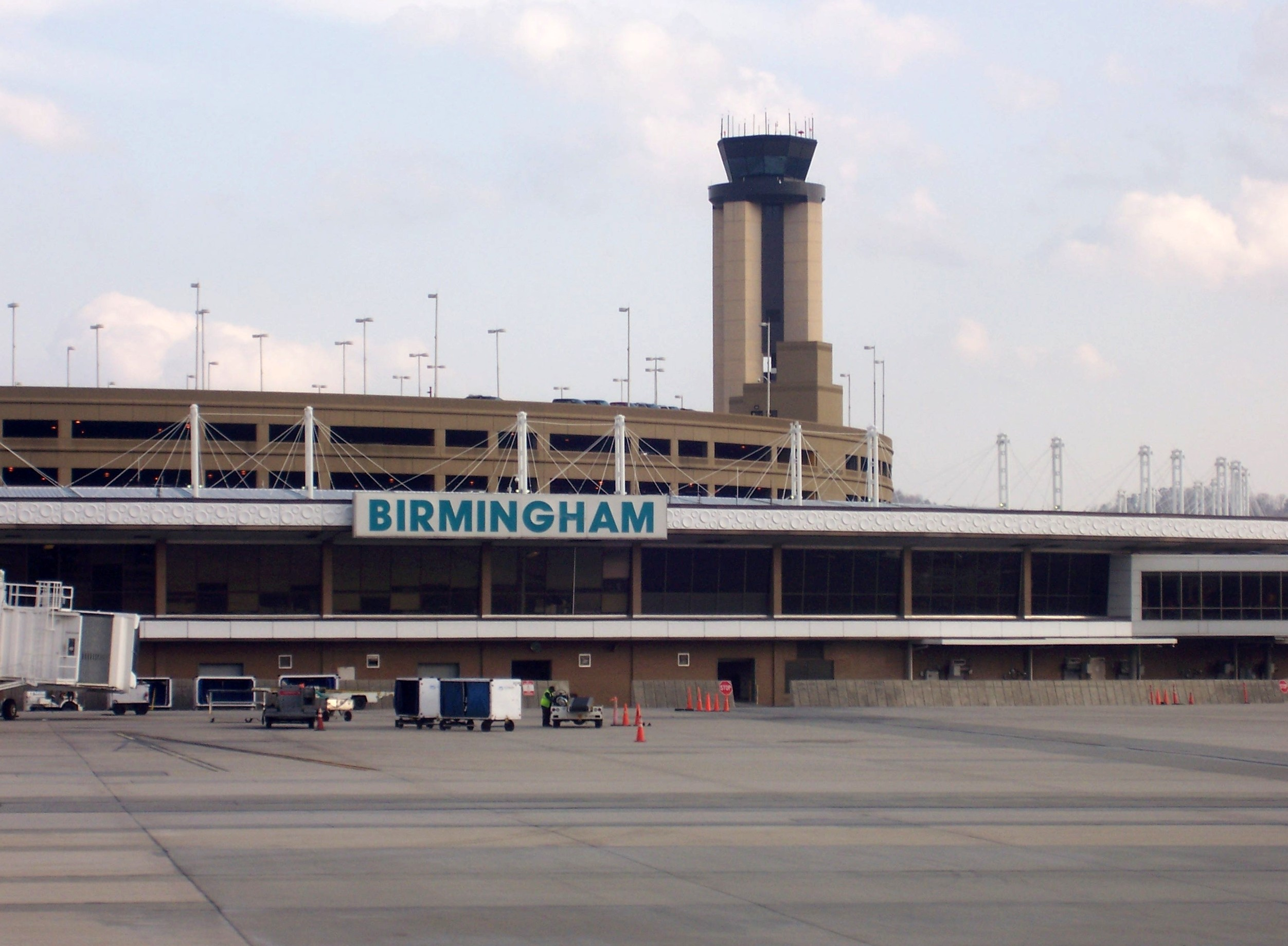
Airport terminal, tower, and parking deck on March 14, 2008

BHM has one terminal building with three concourses, which opened on March 13, 2013 (Concourses A, B) and on August 14, 2014 (Concourse C). The landside terminal (the area before the security threshold) has two levels. The upper level has ticketing and check-in facilities, a business center, and a large function room. The lower level has baggage claim facilities, airline baggage offices, airport operations offices, and meeting rooms available for use. The airport has its own police force with offices on the lower level of the terminal. There are vending machines and ATMs throughout both levels, pre-security.

Terminal A referred to the former 1962 terminal, which was still in use as office space until it was closed in 2011. The former Concourse B was closed in June 2011 and demolished alongside Terminal A for the first phase of the terminal modernization project to make way for two new concourses, A and B, which opened on March 13, 2013. Concourse C was closed on March 13, 2013, upon completion of Concourses A and B. Concourse C was not demolished, but was completely gutted and structurally modified, removing the rotunda at the end of the old concourse and changing the structure to make a rectangle shape with the same width from end to end. It then underwent an intensive remodel covering all aspects of the concourse, culminating in the opening of the concourse to flights on August 14, 2014.

There is a rental car facility in an annex on the ground floor of the parking deck. Eight rental car companies are housed within this facility. The airport offers a parking deck with over 5000 spaces available for hourly and daily parking. A remote lot is available for long term parking, with over 700 spaces. A shuttle runs between the terminal and the remote lot continuously throughout the day. There is a free cell phone waiting lot with a digital flight display for people waiting on arriving passengers.

Beginning in December 2015, Birmingham-Jefferson County Transit Authority introduced two new express Airport Shuttle routes from downtown Birmingham hotels directly to the terminal. The shuttle routes operate hourly on Mondays through Saturdays and the fare is $5.00.

=== Concourses ===
A ribbon cutting ceremony for the new Concourse A and Concourse B took place on February 26, 2013. The new terminal officially opened for business on March 13, 2013. The new Concourse C was completed along with the second half of the main terminal building and baggage claim upon the completion of the second and final phase of the terminal modernization project. A ribbon cutting ceremony for the Concourse C and phase 2 completion was held on August 11, 2014, and Concourse C officially opened for arriving and departing flights on August 14, 2014.

Concourse A, which opened on March 13, 2013, consists of eight gates: A1–A8. It is used by Delta, Spirit, and American. It also contains U.S. Customs and Immigration facilities capable of processing arriving international aircraft. For international arrivals, a partition is closed, redirecting deplaning passengers down a separate corridor to the customs facility. After being processed, passengers proceed through one-way doors into the main arrival hall.

Concourse B, which opened on March 13, 2013, consists of five gates: B1–B5. It is used by American. Concourse C, which opened on August 14, 2014, consists of six gates: C1-C6 with the ability to expand by 4 gates. It is used by Southwest and United. Former Concourse B consisted of six gates, B1-B6. Prior to its closure and demolition, Concourse B was used by Northwest/Northwest Airlink, American/American Eagle, Continental/Continental Express and US Airways Express. Northwest moved to Concourse C in May 2009 and was merged into Delta a year later. American Airlines moved to Concourse C on June 10, 2011; while US Airways and Continental moved to Concourse C on June 24, 2011. Concourse B was then closed and demolished in August 2011 to make way for the construction for future concourses A and B.

Former Concourse C consisted of 13 gates, C1–C14. It was the only concourse at the airport in operation and in use during the first phase of the terminal modernization project. Therefore, all commercial and charter services used this concourse. Concourse C was then closed when the new concourses A and B opened on March 13, 2013.

=== Architecture ===
The 1974 terminal was built in the International style of architecture popular for American commercial and institutional buildings from the 1950s through the late 1970s. It consists of a single curved terminal with concourses radiating outward. Large floor to ceiling plate glass windows form curtain walls on the departure level of the terminal with horizontal bands of repetitive white architectural panels above and below. A slight departure from typical International style, the upper band of panels was decorated with raised circles of four sizes, two circles per size per panel. The roof is flat over the terminal and concourses; a series of steel columns painted white with stay cables for the terminal awning project from the roof. An enclosed white-clad Observation Deck jutted out from the airside terminal face at a sharp angle between the old concourses B and C. On the airside of the terminal, a large horizontal white sign with teal lettering identified the city as Birmingham.

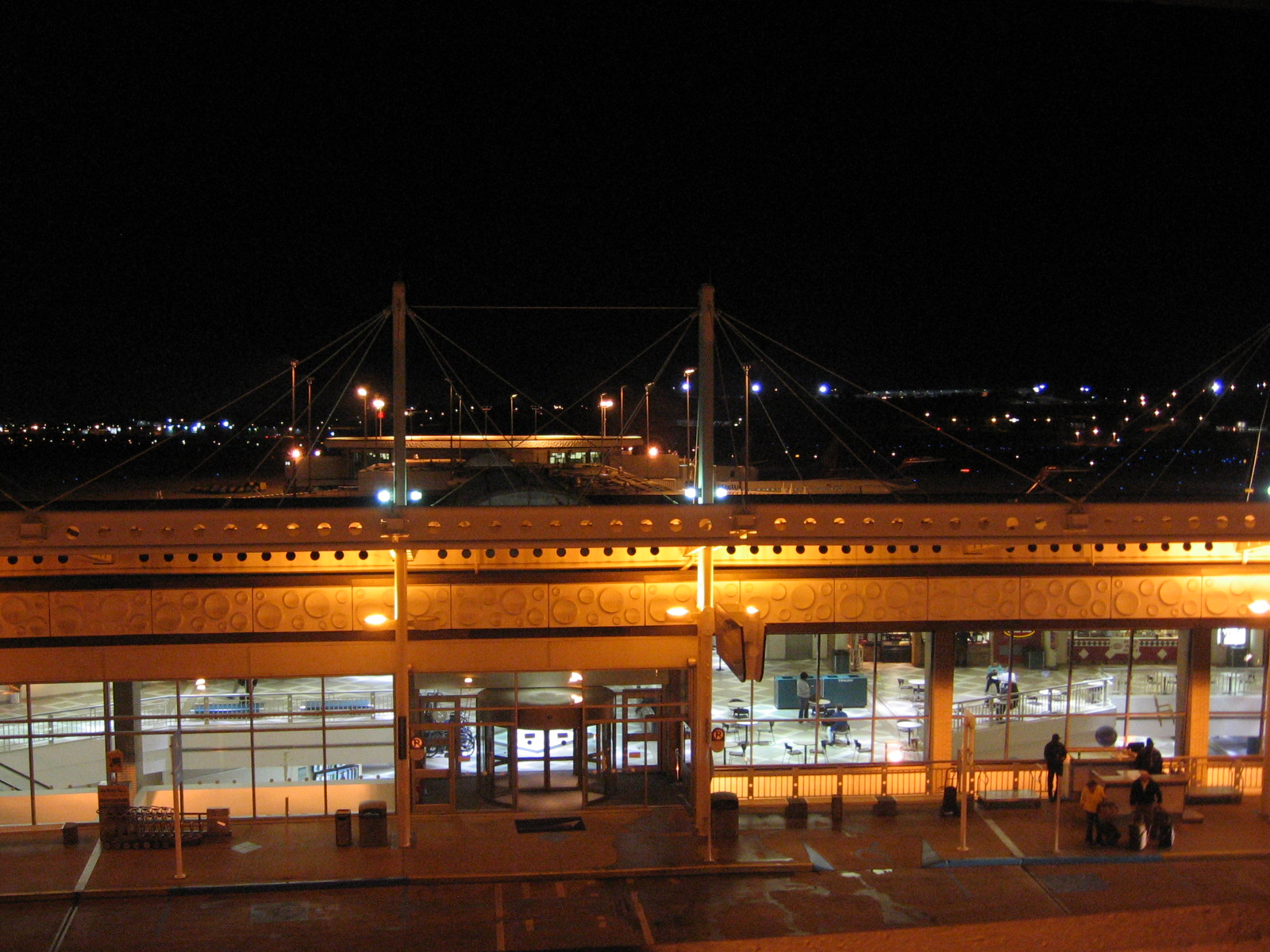
The Birmingham–Shuttlesworth International Airport terminal and the former Concourse C at night as viewed from parking deck

Externally, Concourse C and Concourse B before their reconstruction were radically different from the terminal structure, consisting of straight radial spokes clad with white panels. Concourse C included a circular end which invokes the appearance of the terminal, whereas Concourse B terminated at a flat wall. The concourse walls had relatively few windows, typically at waiting and dining areas. The presence of multiple shops, restrooms and service areas reduced the need for windows in the concourses. Jetways were used for the majority of the gates and aircraft, though Delta Connection and United Express used stairs leading to the tarmac to board flights on regional jets (currently all flights at the new concourses use jetways). Passenger gates and services are on the second floor with airside baggage handling and aircraft servicing on the ground level.

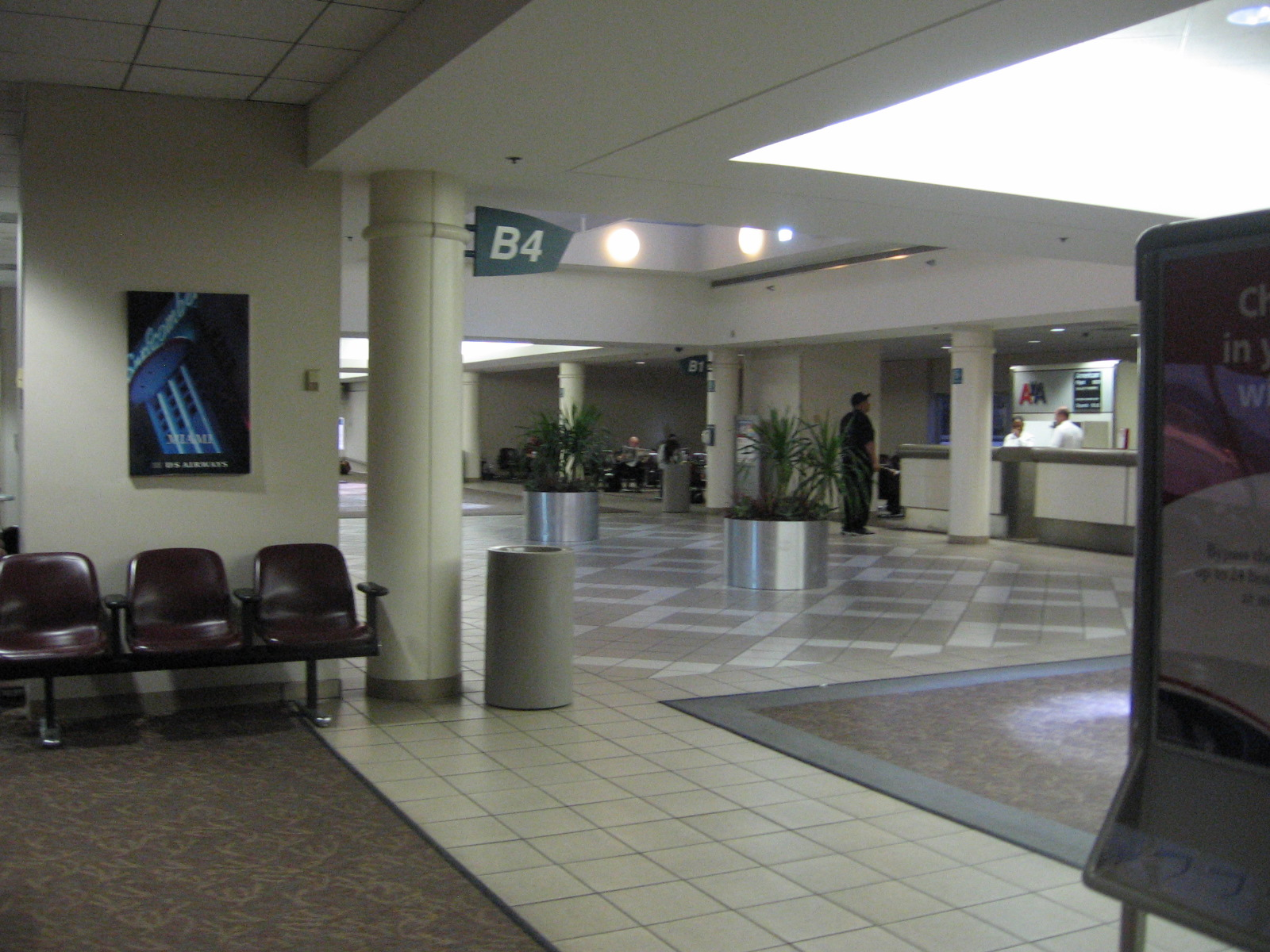
Interior view of the former Concourse B, which was demolished to make way for the new Concourses A and B

The interior of the terminal was renovated in the early 1990s and completed in 1993 at a cost of $50.4 million which included new floor surfaces, lighting, wall coverings, renovated public spaces, and public art. The flooring was a mixture of carpet and large tiles, with tile primarily in the heavily used terminal spaces, dining areas, and restrooms. Numerous planters were positioned in hallways.

The new terminal and concourses completed in the 2010s feature open spaces and clean lines. There is abundant natural light from floor-to-ceiling windows and large skylights. Neutral colors accented with soft blue and chrome are found throughout the terminal.

=== Terminal expansion and modernization ===
In 2014, the airport completed a $201.6 million terminal renovation project. This project included a major renovation and upgrade to the airport's existing Concourse C, which was dismantled down to its structural components and rebuilt. Concourse B was completely demolished and new concourses A and B were built. All three concourses are now linked, allowing passengers to walk from Concourse A, through to Concourse C without exiting the secure area. The main terminal containing the ticketing and baggage claim areas has been completely gutted and remodelled. Additionally, there have been enhancements to the parking deck, allowing passengers to move between the terminal and the parking deck under cover and without navigating any stairs. There is now a single large security screening checkpoint with TSA PreCheck which provides access to all concourses. Many concessions and shopping, as well as US Customs and Border Protection offices have been added. A completely new integrated baggage screening system has been installed to handle the screening of checked luggage. The new terminal is said to be built with new efficient building standards, making it one of the greenest airports in the country. The first phase of construction was completed on February 26, 2013, with the entire modernization project completed in 2014, culminating in a ribbon cutting ceremony held on August 7, 2014. The project team included KPS Group and KHAFRA (Architects & Engineers), A.G. Gaston Construction (Project Management), Margaret Jones Interiors, LLC and Brasfield & Gorrie and BLOC Global Services Group (Construction Management).

On March 22, 2013, a digital flight arrival/departure screen fixture, added as part of the 2013–2014 renovation, fell on a mother and her children, killing ten-year-old Luke Bresette and injuring his mother and two other siblings of Overland Park, Kansas. In September 2014, the Bresette family and companies involved in the installation of the display reached a wrongful death settlement. A bronze relief of Luke Bresette was installed in the landside Departures level near the location of the accident.

=== Artwork displays ===
Several pieces of artwork are displayed within the terminal and on the airport grounds. Approaching the airport along Messer Airport Boulevard, travelers pass a series of white three dimensional triangular shapes placed on raised posts along the shoulder and median of the roadway with a mid-span folded crease to suggest the wings of birds in flight or aircraft. In the 1990s terminal there were multiple pieces of art that became well known to frequent visitors to the airport. However, with the terminal modernisation project, most of these pieces were replaced with new, more modern, and in some cases, technologically advanced works. There are two unique major artwork displays in the terminal, both of which are in Concourse B. The first major display is a living plant wall entitled "Earth Wind and Water: The Landscape of Alabama". This living wall is the largest living wall inside any airport terminal in the United States. The wall is 100 feet wide, 14 feet high, and contains 1,400 square feet of vegetated area. The second major work of art is an electronic display which is approximately 50 feet long and made up of 26 large format electronic LCD displays. The displays contain pictures and video clips which are linked to form an ever-changing moving wall depicting various "stories" focusing on African American history and civil rights.

An art program at the airport puts on display revolving collections of works throughout the terminal. The program includes works from local artists as well as artists from around the country. In addition there is a rotating Barber Motorsports exhibit on the lower level near the baggage claim. This exhibit features frequently changing displays containing various automobiles and race memorabilia such as driving suits and mounted steering wheels from famous race cars. There are many smaller works of art throughout the terminal, both pre and post-security. The airport website has an updated list of the various works of art on display.

=== Airport amenities ===
There are a range of dining and shopping options in the terminal, both pre and post-security. The airport features free Wi-Fi internet access throughout the terminal.

In 2014, Yahoo Travel ranked the airport as the 49th out of 72 on a list of "Every Important U.S. Airport, Ranked by Its Food and Drink."

== Airlines and destinations ==
As of January 2023, the top five markets served non-stop from Birmingham are Atlanta, Dallas/Fort Worth, Charlotte, Houston, and Denver. American Airlines, Delta Air Lines, and Southwest Airlines serve Birmingham with mainline, narrowbody aircraft. Regional airlines provide a large share of daily air carrier service to Birmingham. The most common aircraft serving the airport are the Bombardier CRJ700 / CRJ900, the Embraer E-175, the Boeing 717, the Boeing 737 family, and the Airbus A319/A320.

=== Passenger ===
Airlines	Destinations
American Airlines	Seasonal: Charlotte, Dallas/Fort Worth, Miami
American Eagle	Charlotte, Chicago–O'Hare, Dallas/Fort Worth, Miami, Philadelphia, Washington–National
Breeze Airways	Fort Lauderdale, Raleigh/Durham
Delta Air Lines	Atlanta, Detroit
Delta Connection	Detroit, New York–LaGuardia
Southwest Airlines	Baltimore, Chicago–Midway, Dallas–Love, Denver, Houston–Hobby, Las Vegas, Nashville, Orlando, Phoenix–Sky Harbor, Tampa
United Express	Chicago–O'Hare, Denver, Houston–Intercontinental

=== Cargo ===
In April 2023, Kuehne+Nagel began twice weekly flights from Stuttgart, Germany to Birmingham, primarily to support the central Alabama automotive manufacturing industry.

Airlines	Destinations
Atlas Air	Stuttgart
UPS Airlines	Louisville

== Statistics ==
=== Top destinations ===
Busiest domestic routes from BHM (May 2025 – April 2026)
Rank	Airport	Passengers	Carriers
1	(Georgia (U.S. state)) Atlanta, Georgia	399,371	Delta
2	Dallas/Fort Worth, Texas	134,024	American
3	Charlotte, North Carolina	115,395	American
4	Dallas–Love, Texas	97,997	Southwest
5	Orlando, Florida	95,061	Southwest
6	Denver, Colorado	94,930	Southwest, United
7	Chicago–O'Hare, Illinois	87,393	American, United
8	Houston–Intercontinental, Texas	84,300	United
9	Chicago–Midway, Illinois	56,199	Southwest
10	(New York (state)) New York–LaGuardia, New York	53,494	Delta

=== Airline market share ===
Passenger airlines (includes regional operators) at BHM (May 2025 – April 2026)
Rank	Airline	Passengers	Market share
1	Southwest	1,076,941	32.7%
2	Delta	982,760	29.9%
3	American	840,743	25.5%
4	United	343,003	10.4%
5	Spirit	34,200	1.0%

=== Other statistics ===
Traffic by calendar year
	Passengers	Change from previous year	Aircraft operations	Change from previous year	Cargo (metric tons)	Change from previous year
2005	3,138,429	▲8.6%	144,178	▼5.0%	30,526	▲1.9%
2006	3,052,058	▼2.8%	124,103	▼13.9%	28,984	▼6.7%
2007	3,222,689	▲14.3%	138,975	▼1.0%	31,075	▲1.8%
2009	2,934,317	▼5.7%	106,780	▼13.3%	22,740	▼14.9%
2011	2,895,161	▼1.9%	104,842	▼4.6%	24,913	▼0.3%
2012	2,864,058	▼1.3%	96,839	▼2.9%	25,310	▼0.7%
2013	2,686,393	▼6.2%	95,734	▼1.1%	23,824	▼5.9%
2014	2,624,665	▼2.3%	94,534	▲8.7%	22,501	▼5.1%
2015	2,695,399	▲2.7%	90,002	▼4.8%	23,769	▲3.2%
2016	2,653,207	▼1.6%	94,651	▲5.2%	24,253	▲2.0%
2017	2,705,014	▲2.0%	96,053	▲1.5%	24,837	▲2.4%
2018	2,972,776	▲10.0%	101,202	▲6.5%		
2019	3,090,604	▲4.0%			22,289	
2020	1,278,600	▼56.9%			21,682	▼2.7%
2021	2,193,604	▲203.9%			22,037	▲2.0%
2022	2,689,679	▲22.7%			20,863	▼1.0%
2023	3,056,215	▲13.6%			26,118	▲25.2%
2024	3,243,023	▲6.1%			25,446	▼2.6%
2025	3,283,164	▲1.0%	41,624		26,641	▲4.7%

== Accidents and incidents ==
- A fatal Part 121 (air carrier) accident occurred: the crash of Pennsylvania Central Airlines (a United Airlines predecessor) Flight 105 on January 6, 1946. The DC-3 landed on Runway 18 and continued off the end of the runway into Village Creek. Three crew members sustained fatal injuries as a result of the accident.
- Two Part 135 (air taxi & commuter) accidents have occurred since 1962 which resulted in fatalities. The most significant accident was the crash of L'Express Airlines Flight 508 on July 10, 1991, with 13 people killed. Eight fatal general aviation accidents have occurred at or in the vicinity of Birmingham International Airport since 1962, including a flight line ground accident.
- On August 14, 2013, UPS Airlines Flight 1354, N155UP, an Airbus A300-600, crashed in an open field on approach to Runway 18, killing both the pilot and co-pilot.

== Controversy ==
In September 2013, Atlanta-based ExpressJet Airlines, then the largest regional US passenger airline, told its pilots to avoid landing on Runway 18, following the crash of UPS Airlines Flight 1354 in Birmingham. An internal review following the accident concluded planes came "dangerously close" to nearby hills if even a few feet too low, and that there was a significant "terrain threat" and a non-standard glide path. An aviation safety expert said the runway was "absolutely" safe.

== Cultural references ==
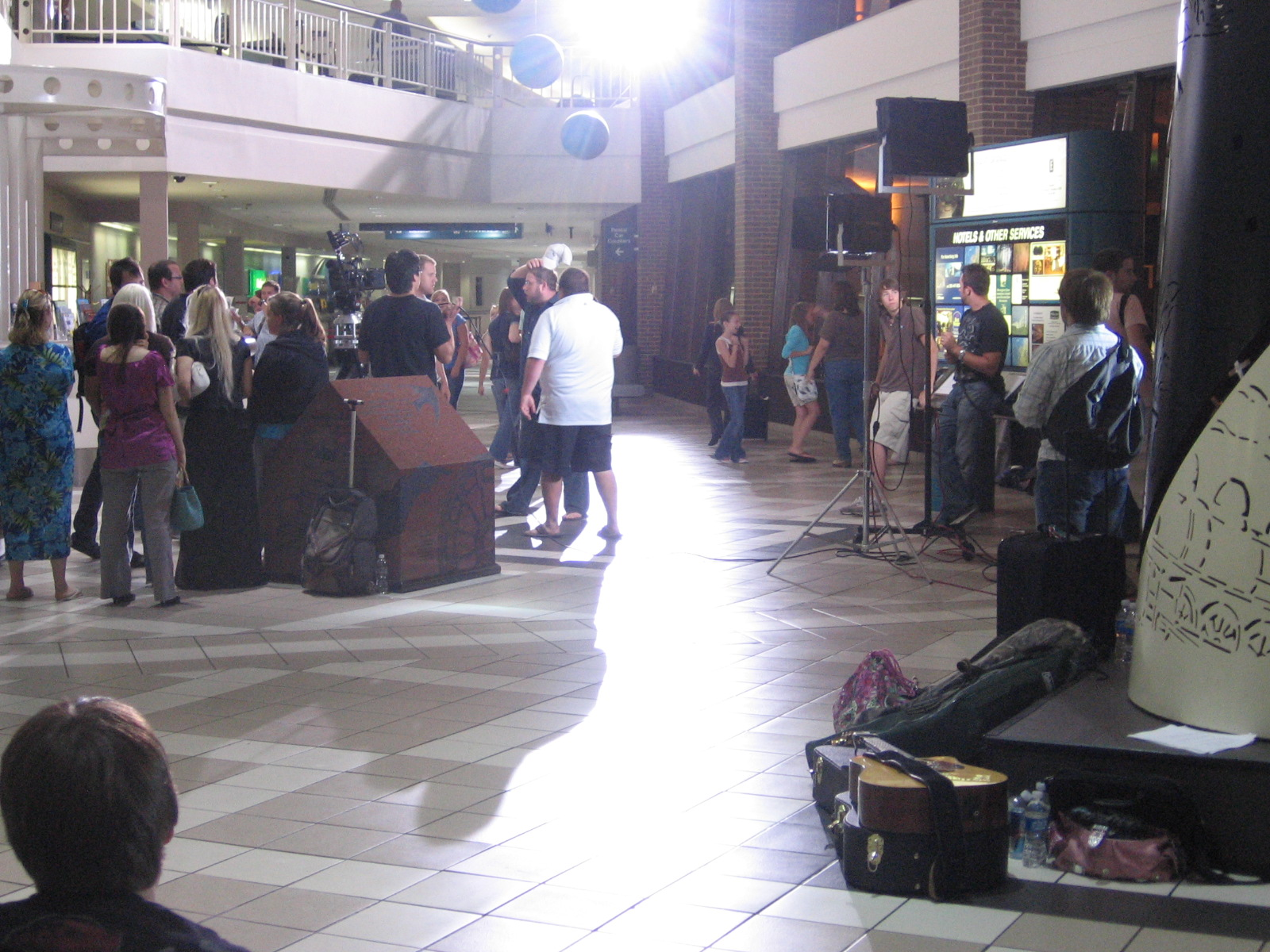
The majority of the 2008 video filming took place in the airport lower level baggage claim 2 and 3 areas of the main terminal.

A music video for contemporary Christian musician Brandon Heath's song "Give Me Your Eyes" was filmed over the night of July 23–24, 2008 at the airport after most flights had landed for the night. It was directed by the Erwin Brothers and premiered on the Gospel Music Channel on August 23, 2008.

== See also ==
- Alabama International Airport Authority
- Alabama World War II Army Airfields
- List of airports in Alabama
