= CCIX =

CCIX may refer to:

- The Roman number notation for 209
- Cache coherent interconnect for accelerators, a consortium dealing with connectivity and communications issues in computer technology
- CCIX, a historic Association of American Railroads reporting mark for Stauffer Chemical Company, now Cleveland-Cliffs Iron Ore Co.
- UA-CCIX, the codename for the Kilgore cyborgs in the fighting video game Killer Instinct
