= Pioneer Valley Railroad =

Railroad in Massachusetts

Coordinates: 42°8′32″N 72°43′36.5″W

Pioneer Valley Railroad (PVRR)

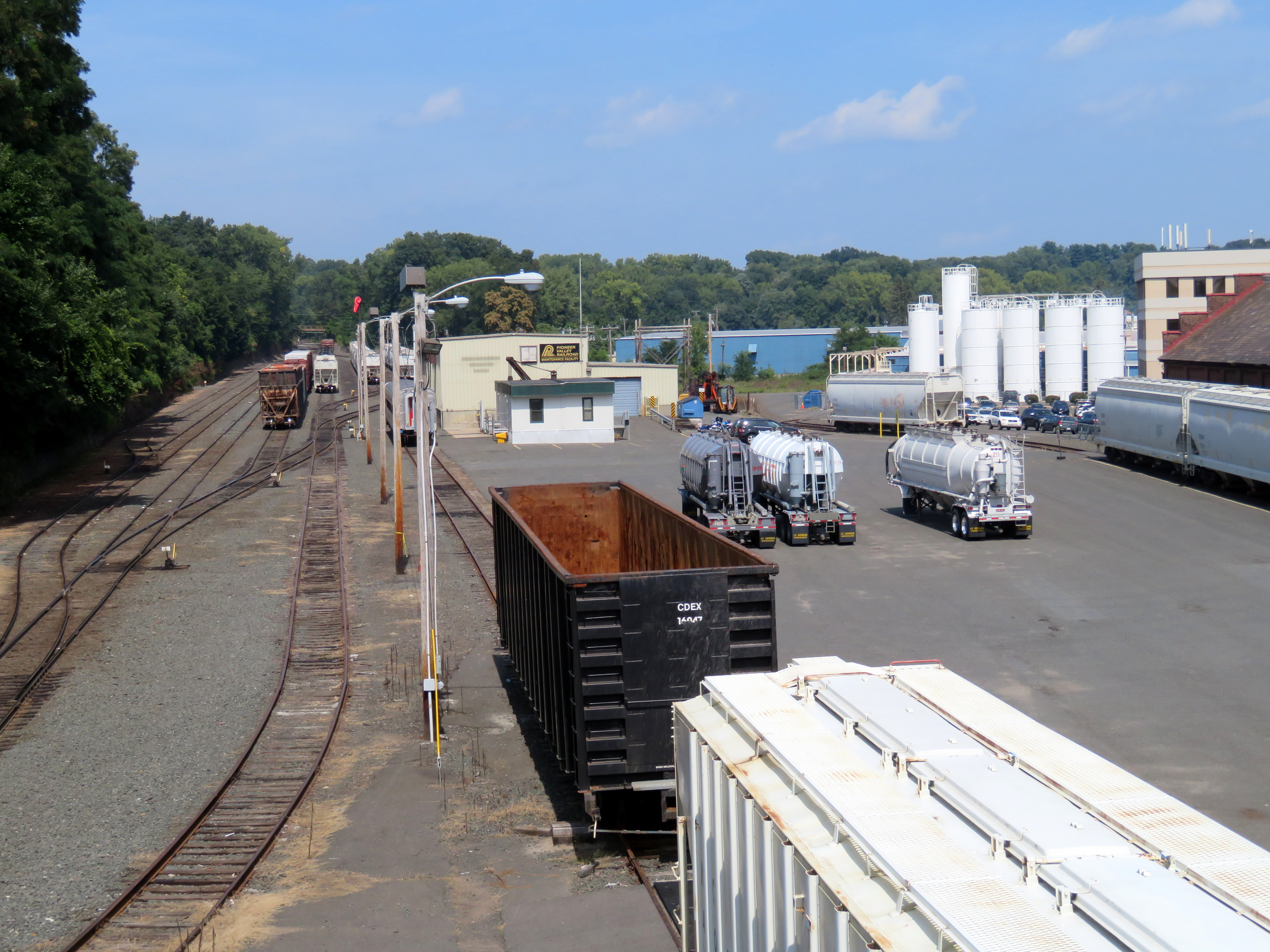
- Westfield Yard in August 2018

Overview
- Headquarters: Westfield, Massachusetts
- Reporting mark: PVRR
- Locale: Hampden County, Massachusetts
- Dates of operation: 1982–
- Predecessor: Conrail

Technical
- Track gauge: 1,435 mm (4 ft 8 1/2 in) standard gauge
- Length: 17 miles (27 km)

Other
- Website: pinsly.com

The Pioneer Valley Railroad, founded in 1982, is a Class III short line freight railroad operating the former Conrail (née-New York, New Haven & Hartford) trackage in the western part of Massachusetts in towns of Westfield, Holyoke, and Southampton. The railroad has been owned by the Pinsly Railroad Company since its founding, with headquarters in Westfield, Massachusetts.

In August 2023, Macquarie Infrastructure Partners reached an agreement with Pinsly to acquire the railroad through its subsidiary Gulf & Atlantic Railways.

== History ==
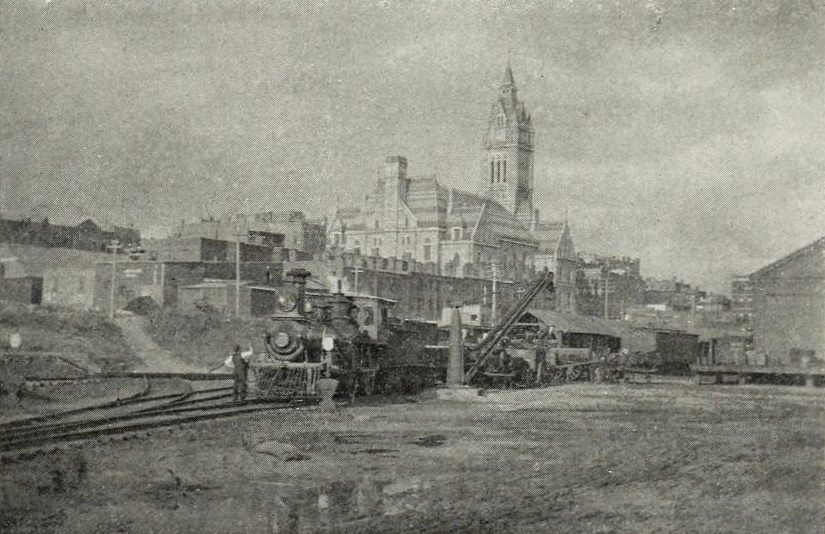
An engine for the New York, New Haven and Hartford Railroad in the 1890s at a line of the present-day Pioneer Valley Railroad, now used for recreation at Holyoke Heritage State Park.

=== Before the PVRR (1847–1982) ===
The tracks that the PVRR operates on were originally constructed by the New Haven and Northampton (also known as the Canal Line) from 1842 to 1856 as part of the company's line between its namesake cities. The branch line connecting Westfield and Holyoke was built in 1871. Both lines passed to the New York, New Haven and Hartford Railroad (reporting mark NH) when it took control of the New Haven and Northampton in 1887. The bankrupt New Haven was included in the newly formed Penn Central Railroad on January 1, 1969, which abandoned the tracks north of Southampton. Penn Central promptly went bankrupt in what was at the time the largest corporate bankruptcy in U.S. history, and was folded into government created Conrail in 1976, which became the new operator. Conrail ended operations on the tracks around Westfield in 1982, claiming the two lines were no longer profitable to operate. At this time, Pinsly Railroad Company purchased both from Conrail for under $300,000, along with making a guarantee to the state of Massachusetts to commit $800,000 in spending to track repairs and improvements within four years of the purchase. Upon purchasing the two lines, Pinsly began railroad operations on the line under the Pioneer Valley Railroad name.

=== Pioneer Valley Railroad begins operations (1982–2000) ===
The Pioneer Valley Railroad began operations with three locomotives of 1939 and 1949 vintage, 13 employees, and 24 miles of trackage. In 1983, the railroad had a total of 40 customers. The company began to reverse the fortunes of its lines by dropping a $590 surcharge per car that was instated by Conrail, pursuing small customers that Conrail ignored, and forging good relationships with shippers.

The company gained an additional 1.7 miles (2.7 km) of track in Easthampton by a $17,500 purchase from previous owner Boston and Maine Railroad on March 20, 1984. Similarly to its lines purchased from Conrail, PVRR pledged to drop a $276 per car surcharge that B&M had charged customers, which was responsible for the loss of most business on the line. Several customers which had previously switched to trucking expressed support of PVRR's purchase of the line and ending of the surcharge.

As traffic began to grow in the 1980s, the railroad received part of a $5.3 million appropriation from the United States Congress in the summer of 1987 to install heavier rail on its line between Westfield and Holyoke.

Service to Easthampton was discontinued following an April 23, 1987, derailment of a PVRR train. Despite criticism from residents and local industry, the company stated in January 1992 that it had no plans to resume service, and was considering selling the right of way, due to a downturn in Easthampton's industries during the 1980s.

=== The PVRR in the 21st century (2000–present) ===
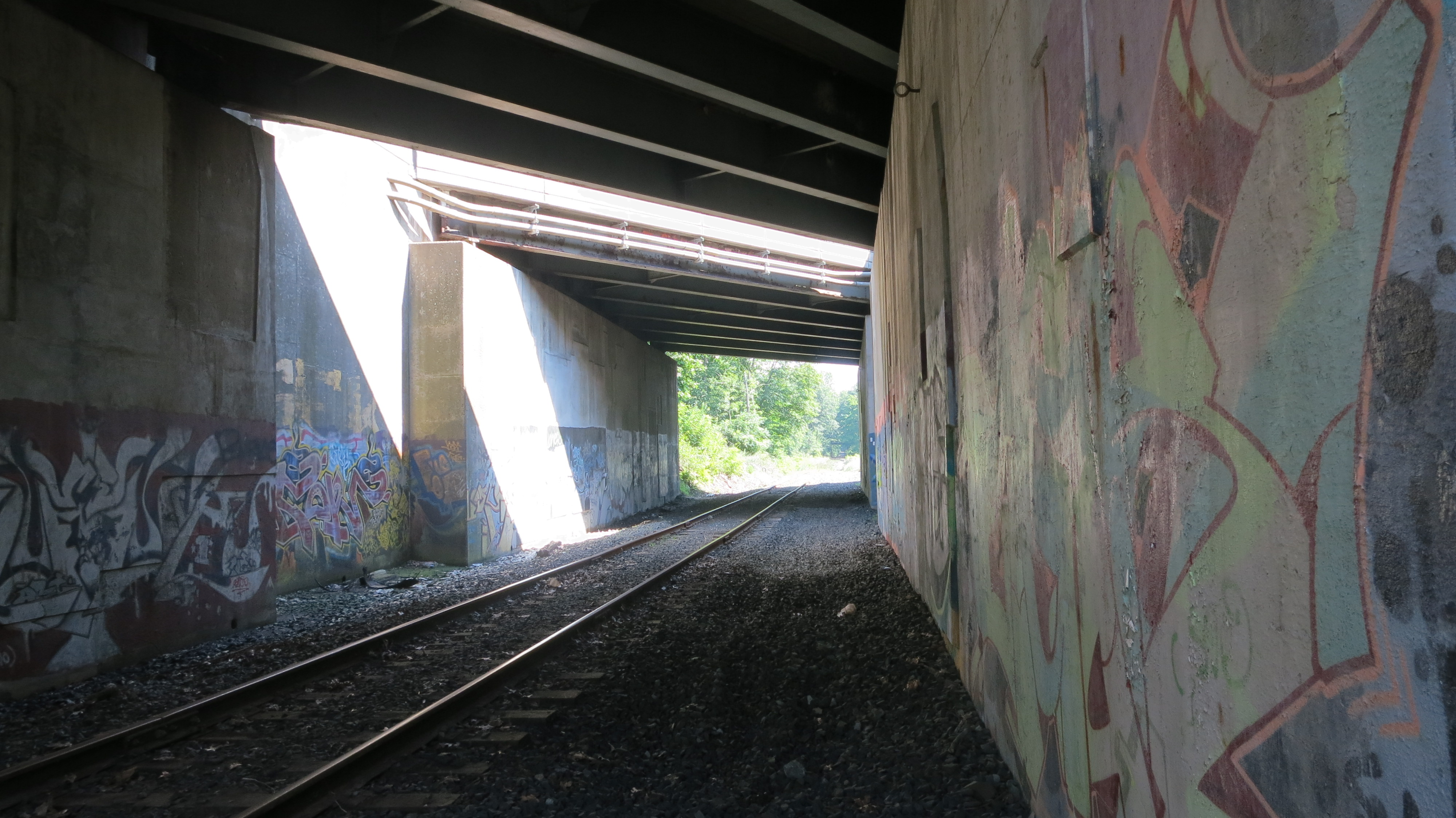
The Pioneer Valley Railroad's line to Holyoke seen under the Mass Pike in Westfield

The PVRR was one of 6 railroad companies to receive a request for proposals from the state of Vermont in early 2000 to potentially operate a railroad line owned by the state between White River Junction and Wells River. Ultimately, the state chose a railroad based in Vermont to operate the line.

On October 5, 2017, the Massachusetts Department of Transportation awarded PVR a $495,000 grant to complete the PVR Knowledge Corridor Service Interchange project that is planned to reduce local truck traffic by improving the connection between Pan Am Railways and Pioneer Valley Railroad in Holyoke. MassDOT awarded the railroad a grant of $384,022 in September 2021 to expand its yard facilities in Easthampton, matching PVRR's commitment of 40% of the total project cost.

In August 2023, Macquarie Infrastructure Partners reached an agreement with Pinsly to acquire the railroad through its subsidiary Gulf & Atlantic Railways, now known as the Pinsly Railroad Company.

On January 2025, PVRR gained approval to build a 156,000-square-foot warehouse and spur on a undeveloped 13.3-acre lot owned by the railroad.

The Pioneer Valley Railroad's #2189 on running along Middle Water St in Holyoke.

== Routes ==
As of March 2022, the Pioneer Valley Railroad owns and operates 31 miles of trackage in Massachusetts, split between two lines which connect at Westfield Main Yard in Westfield, Massachusetts. It is also where the railroad interchanges with CSX Transportation. Major commodities transported include lumber, steel, and waste.

- Holyoke Branch: Westfield to Holyoke
- Southampton Branch: Westfield to Southampton

== See also ==
- Manhan Rail Trail
