= Pinsly Railroad Company (1938–2023) =

- Industry: Rail transport
- Founded: 1938; 88 years ago
- Founder: Samuel M. Pinsly
- Successor: Pinsly Railroad Company (2024)
- Headquarters: Westfield, Massachusetts
- Subsidiaries: Pioneer Valley Railroad
- Website: www.pinsly.com

Pinsly Railroad Company, based in Westfield, Massachusetts, was an American short line railroad holding company. It was one of the oldest such companies in the United States, and has owned railroads continuously since its founding in 1938. As of 2022 Pinsly's sole railroad subsidiary is the Pioneer Valley Railroad in Massachusetts. In August 2023, Macquarie Infrastructure Partners reached an agreement with Pinsly to acquire the railroad through its subsidiary Gulf & Atlantic Railways, which became the new Pinsly Railroad Company.

== History ==
Born in Cambridge, Massachusetts in 1899, Samuel M. Pinsly received degrees in engineering and law from Northwestern University before briefly serving in the U.S. Army during World War I. Pinsly founded his shortline operating company in 1938 with the purchase of the Hoosac Tunnel and Wilmington Railroad from his father-in-law, fellow shortline operator H.E. Salzberg. While the line was rebuilt and turned a profit, extensive line relocations due to a new dam forced the railroad to be abandoned in 1971. Pinsly went on to acquire a number of lines throughout New England and the Southeast until his death in 1977. He was succeeded by Marjorie "Maggie" Silver, one of the first women to own a railroad company in the United States.

Pinsly sold their 3 Florida shortlines (Florida Central Railroad, Florida Midland Railroad and Florida Northern Railroad) to 3i RR Holdings GP, LLC and subsidiaries (d.b.a. "Regional Rail, LLC") in November 2019. Pinsly's business development manager stated in 2022 that the company sold off its other subsidiaries to focus exclusively on the Pioneer Valley Railroad. Pinsly additionally owns Railroad Distribution Services, a company which handles distribution and transloading.

=== Historic list of Pinsly railroads ===
These are the railroads that were once under the common ownership of Pinsly, listed in order of acquisition.

- Hoosac Tunnel and Wilmington Railroad - (1938-1971)
- Saratoga and Schuylerville Railroad - (1945-1956)
- Sanford and Eastern Railroad - (1949-1961)
- Suncook Valley Railroad - (October 1952 - December 1952)
- Claremont and Concord Railroad - (1954-1988)
- Montpelier and Barre Railroad - (1957-1980)
- Greenville and Northern Railway - (1957-1997)
- Frankfort and Cincinnati Railroad - (1961-1985)
- St. Johnsbury and Lamoille County Railroad - (1968-1973)
- Pioneer Valley Railroad - (1982–present) Formed in 1982 to operate former New York, New Haven and Hartford Railroad branch lines acquired from Conrail serving Westfield and Holyoke, Massachusetts.
- Arkansas Midland Railroad - (1992-2014)
- Warren and Saline River Railroad - (1992-2014)
- Prescott and Northwestern Railroad - (2010-2014) Founded in 1992, the Arkansas Midland Railroad was formed to operate a number of disconnected branches, including the Prescott and Northwestern Railroad and the Warren & Saline River Railroad. The Arkansas lines were sold to Genesee & Wyoming Industries in 2014.
- Florida Central Railroad - (1986-2019)
- Florida Midland Railroad - (1987-2019)
- Florida Northern Railroad - (1988-2019)
