= North Louisiana and Arkansas Railroad =

Railroad in Louisiana and Arkansas

Overview
- Headquarters: Russellville, Arkansas
- Locale: Arkansas and Louisiana
- Dates of operation: 2011–

Technical
- Track gauge: 4 ft 8 1/2 in (1,435 mm)
- Length: 62 mi (100 km)

The North Louisiana and Arkansas Railroad (NL&AR) operates more than 62 miles of track, extending from McGehee, Arkansas to Lake Providence, Louisiana. The NL&AR owns about 24 miles of the track, while about 41 miles are leased from the Lake Providence Port Authority Commission and the Southeast Arkansas Economic Development District.

== History ==
The rail line was originally built by the Memphis, Helena and Louisiana Railroad in 1878, and has had a number of owners over the years. In 1988, the line was sold to the Delta Southern Railroad. In 2011, when the Delta Southern sought to abandon the line, the current owners acquired it and began NL&RA operations in August 2011. Arkansas Short Line Railroads of Russellville, Arkansas owns the NL&RA.

== Operations ==
The line interchanges with the Arkansas Midland Railroad at McGehee, which in turn interchanges with the Union Pacific.

As reported in 2019, the trackage was in poor shape, with NL&AR trains averaging just 2.5 miles per hour. However, the line received a federal grant that year which, along with funding from other public and private entitles, is intended to rehabilitate the line and at least allow 25 mile-per-hour speeds.
