= South Buffalo Railway =

US railroad

Overview
- Headquarters: Rochester, New York
- Reporting mark: SBRR
- Locale: New York, United States

Technical
- Track gauge: 4 ft 8 1/2 in (1,435 mm) standard gauge

The South Buffalo Railway (reporting mark SBRR) operates more than fifty miles of railway lines along the southeast shore of Lake Erie, in the United States. South Buffalo connects to CSX, Norfolk Southern, Canadian Pacific, and Canadian National Railway.

== Historical connections ==
At one time the connections were with New York Central Railroad, Pennsylvania Railroad, Lehigh Valley Railroad, Baltimore and Ohio Railroad, Norfolk and Western Railway, Chesapeake and Ohio Railway, Delaware, Lackawanna and Western Railroad, and New York, Chicago and St. Louis Railroad.

== Ownership ==
The South Buffalo Railway was sold by a private family in 2001 for $36.4 million to the Genesee and Wyoming Railroad. The main office is in Rochester, New York.

== Short Line Railroad of the Year ==
Preceded by Arkansas Midland Railroad	Short Line Railroad of the Year; 2001	Succeeded by Winchester and Western Railroad
