= Arkansas Midland Railroad (1992) =

American Class III short-line railroad

Overview
- Headquarters: Malvern, Arkansas
- Reporting mark: AKMD
- Locale: Arkansas
- Dates of operation: 1992–present

Technical
- Track gauge: 4 ft 8 1/2 in (1,435 mm)

The Arkansas Midland Railroad (reporting mark AKMD) is a Class III short-line railroad headquartered in Malvern, Arkansas.

AKMD operates 138 miles (222 km) of line in Arkansas consisting of seven disconnected branch lines and two sister railroads, the Prescott & Northwestern (PNW) and the Warren & Saline River (WSR). The AKMD branches were formerly part of the Union Pacific Railroad, or a predecessor, while the PNW and WSR lines were acquired from Potlatch Corporation. All branch lines connect (interchange traffic) with Union Pacific Railroad. AKMD also interchanges with BNSF in North Little Rock, and the North Louisiana and Arkansas Railroad at McGehee.

- Hot Springs Branch: 33.3 mi (53.6 km) from Malvern, through Hot Springs, to Mountain Pine
- North Little Rock Branch: 14.6 miles (23.5 km) from North Little Rock to Galloway (7.8 mi. former Cotton Belt, 6.8 mi (10.9 km). former Rock Island)
- Warren Branch: 39.4 mi (63.4 km) from Warren to Dermott, with trackage rights over an additional 5.6 miles (9.0 km) to McGehee
- Cypress Bend Branch: 11.2 mi (18.0 km) from McGehee to Cypress Bend
- Helena Branch: 24.9 mi (40.1 km) from Lexa to Helena
- Jacksonville Branch: 2.7 mi (4.3 km)
- Prescott and Northwestern Railroad (PNW, affiliated): 5.7 mi (9.2 km)
- Warren and Saline River Railroad (WSR, affiliated): 2.7 mi (4.3 km)
- Gurdon Branch (emergency operation of a segment of the Caddo Valley Railroad): 3.1 mi (5.0 km)

AKMD traffic generally consists of forest and agricultural products, aggregates, aluminum, building materials and chemicals.

AKMD was a subsidiary of Pinsly Railroad Company, a holding company owning seven short-line railroads in the United States. The Hot Springs, Helena and Galloway branches are owned by AKMD (purchased in 1992); the Warren, Cypress Bend and Jacksonville branches are leased; the PNW and WSR are owned by Pinsly and operated by AKMD.

On December 5, 2014, Genesee & Wyoming filed a Notice of Exemption with the Surface Transportation Board to acquire AKMD (along with affiliates PNW and WSR) from Pinsly. The acquisition was complete by 2015.

== Locomotive fleet ==
No.	Model	Builder	Built date	Status	Notes
707	GP8	EMD	-	Scrapped	Scrapped due to G&W's EPA scandal
722	GP8	EMD	March 1953	Operational	
728	GP8	EMD	-	Slated for scrap	Set to be scrapped due to G&W's EPA scandal
908	GP8	EMD	January 1952	Operational	
2076	GP38-2	EMD	November 1963	Sold	
2500	GP35	EMD	May 1964	Operational	
2501	GP35	EMD	November 1963	Operational	
2502	GP35	EMD	April 1965	Operational	
2503	GP35	EMD	May 1964	Operational	
2504	GP35	EMD	February 1964	Operational	
2505	GP35	EMD	February 1964	Sold	
3500	GP38-2	EMD	-	Operational	
3502	GP38-2	EMD	-	Operational	
3558	GP38-2	EMD	November 1976	Operational	

Preceded by South Central Florida Express	Short Line Railroad of the Year; 2000	Succeeded by South Buffalo Railway
