= Caddo and Choctaw Railroad =

Shortline rail carrier in Arkansas, US

Overview
- Headquarters: Rosboro, Arkansas, US
- Reporting mark: C&CRR
- Locale: Arkansas
- Dates of operation: 1907–1924

Technical
- Track gauge: 4 ft 8 1/2 in (1,435 mm) standard gauge
- Length: 14.018 miles (22.560 km)

The Caddo and Choctaw Railroad (reporting mark C&CRR) was a shortline rail carrier in Arkansas between 1907 and 1924. It primarily served the timber industry.

== History ==
The C&CRR was incorporated April 19, 1907, in Arkansas, for the stated purpose of constructing, owning, operating, and maintaining a railroad from Rosboro in Pike County to a point near Langley, Arkansas, also in Pike County, about 23 miles. One source indicates the ultimate goal was to extend to Ft. Smith. However, the route as built between 1908 and 1911 extended only from Rosboro, where it interchanged with the St. Louis, Iron Mountain and Southern Railway, to a point known as Cooper Junction—near the present Daisy, Arkansas— where it connected with the private trackage of its majority stakeholder, the Caddo River Lumber Company. The line's revenue was mostly made from tonnage incident to the lumber industry, but it did also carry passengers and other freight. Its single-track, standard gauge mainline was 13.056 miles long, which with 0.962 miles of yard tracks and sidings made the entire railroad 14.018 miles in length.

The C&CRR was sold in September 1911 to the Memphis, Dallas and Gulf Railroad, and was operated by that company until April 1913 when the purchaser failed to comply with the sale agreement. At that point the railway reverted to being an independent carrier. A snapshot of the company's condition as of June 30, 1916 shows it with two locomotives and 44 train freight cars. A 1919 builder's photo shows one of its engines, a Baldwin 2-6-2 Prairie-type steam locomotive, in C&CRR livery.

The railroad stopped operations in 1924. The trackage was subsequently abandoned.

== Legacy ==
C&CCR #2, a 1919 Baldwin 2-6-2 which started as the Ozan-Graysonia Lumber Company #2 and after service with the C&CRR was sold to the Prescott and Northwestern Railroad which renumbered it as 7, was most recently in service from 1962 until 2012 and is still on display at the Black Hills Central Railroad in Keystone, South Dakota. It has appeared on screen in the miniseries Into the West, in the Snow Train episodes in Season 16 of the TV series Gunsmoke, and elsewhere.

C&CRR #4, a Baldwin 2-8-2 built in 1915 for the railroad, after many changes in ownership and appearances in films such as Emperor of the North and Stand by Me, is operational and currently located at the Age of Steam Roundhouse lettered as the McCloud River #19.

C&CRR #11, a 2-6-2 built for the road by Baldwin, was sold to the Reader Railroad in Arkansas in 1941, and has had multiple other owners over time, ending up on static display in Riney-B Park near Nicholasville, Kentucky where it still resides.
