= Prescott and Northwestern Railroad =

Overview
- Parent company: Genesee & Wyoming
- Headquarters: Prescott, Arkansas
- Reporting mark: PNW
- Locale: Arkansas
- Dates of operation: 1890–present

Technical
- Track gauge: 4 ft 8 1/2 in (1,435 mm) standard gauge
- Length: 6 miles (9.7 km)

The Prescott and Northwestern Railroad (reporting mark PNW) is a 6 miles (9.7 km) long short-line railroad headquartered in Prescott, Arkansas. It is operated by Arkansas Midland Railroad, which is owned by Genesee & Wyoming.

The railroad was chartered in 1890, for the purpose of constructing a railroad north-northwest from Prescott to access timberlands for the Ozan Lumber Company. Track was gradually extended from Prescott to Arcadia, Blevins, McCaskill, Belton, Tokio, and Highland (Pike County), a distance of 31 miles. Early in its history, the railroad operated several logging branches and the line extended beyond Highland to tap lumber stands. The railroad connected at Tokio with the line of the Memphis Dallas and Gulf Railroad which operating between Ashdown, Arkansas and Hot Springs. After 1922, that line became the Murfreesboro -Nashville Southwestern Railroad, operating between Nashville and Murfreesboro until 1951. For many years the unused crossing diamond lay in the weeds next to the mainline of the PNW in Tokio.

The primary traffic carried by the Prescott and Northwestern was forest products, but for a number of years the line also carried an extensive crop of Elberta peaches from Highland (Pike County) to Prescott during the fruit harvesting season. At Prescott, the refrigerator cars of fruit shipments were transferred to the Missouri Pacific Railroad for shipment to northern markets. The remains of the concrete icing house still stands adjacent to the line in Prescott. There were several gravel pits located in the Tokio area that saw extensive use prior to 1920.

By the 1950s, outbound lumber from the Prescott mill, along with gypsum from a gypsum mine at Highland made up most of the traffic handled by the PNW.

Mixed train passenger service was discontinued in November 1945, and freight service to Highland ended with the closure of a gypsum mine, the last industry not in Prescott utilizing rail service, in 1980. The railroad was famous for operating a full steam pulled, mixed train only on Fridays after 1930. The remainder of the week, passenger, express and mail service were handled by a homemade metal railbus known as the Elberta Zephyr. The rear storage area of that vehicle still exists as a storage building next to the enginehouse. Although unused north of Prescott, the track continued to be maintained by the railroad for possible reuse when second growth timber was harvested. During the early 1970s, the original rail was replaced by heavier and newer rail on the mainline.

In 1994 a change in corporate strategy resulted in the unused part of the railroad being formally abandoned and dismantled. Since that time, PNW has operated 5 miles of switching track in Prescott, with traffic being between the sawmill, a Firestone Rubber Plant and the Missouri Pacific (now Union Pacific) connection. The Prescott sawmill changed hands several times over the years. Current owner Potlatch has closed the mill and sold the railroad to Arkansas Midland. Firestone is currently the only customer.

The railroad operated a number of steam engines over the years, some bought new, some from other Ozan Lumber Company properties. A PNW 1919 Baldwin 2-6-2, starting life as the Ozan-Graysonia Lumber Company #2 before seeing service as a Caddo and Choctaw Railroad unit and later becoming the Prescott and Northwestern Railroad #7, was in service from 1962 until 2012 and is still on display at the Black Hills Central Railroad in Keystone, South Dakota. It has appeared on screen in the miniseries Into the West, in the Snow Train episodes in Season 16 of the TV series Gunsmoke, and elsewhere.

After steam was retired in the mid-fifties, the line operated three 70-ton General Electric locomotives bought second hand. The railroad currently operates an EMD SW-series switch engine.

Pinsly Railroad Company acquired PNW in 2009. On December 5, 2014, Genesee & Wyoming filed a Notice of Exemption with the Surface Transportation Board to acquire PNW along with the Arkansas Midland Railroad and the Warren and Saline River Railroad, from Pinsly.

Map of Prescott and Northwestern Railroad
