= Grenada Railroad =

American railroad

Grenada Railroad LLC
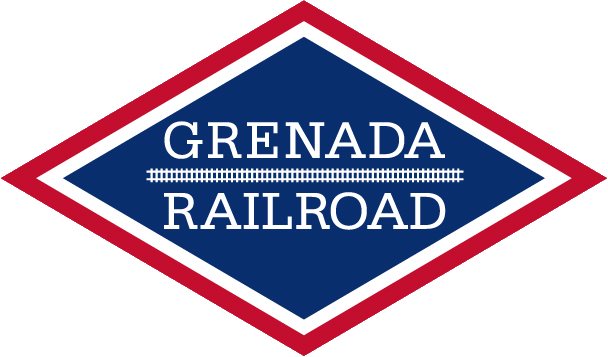
- Grenada Railroad Logo

Overview
- Headquarters: Grenada, Mississippi
- Reporting mark: GRYR
- Locale: Southern United States
- Dates of operation: 2009–present
- Predecessor: Grenada Railway; Canadian National; Illinois Central Railroad
- Successor: Grenada Railroad LLC

Technical
- Track gauge: 4 ft 8 1/2 in (1,435 mm) standard gauge
- Length: 230 mi (370 km)

Other
- Website: pinsly.com/railroads/grenada-railroad/

The Grenada Railroad (reporting mark GRYR) is a 228-mile long (290 km) shortline railroad that runs from Southaven, Mississippi to Canton, Mississippi, along the former Illinois Central Railroad trackage operated by Gulf & Atlantic Railways LLC. Grenada station is its headquarters.

The main commodities the Class III railroad hauls include chemicals, flour, lumber, paper, plastics, and petroleum. The GRYR interchanges at Canton, Mississippi, with the Canadian National, and at Memphis, Tennessee with CN, Norfolk Southern, Union Pacific, BNSF, CSX, Canadian Pacific Kansas City (at Jackson, Mississippi,)

== History ==
The Line began in the 1860s when two railroads met in Grenada, Mississippi. The Mississippi Central Railroad arrived in Grenada in 1860, and in 1861, the Mississippi and Tennessee Railroad. After the Civil War, the lines were rebuilt, and both were acquired by the Illinois Central Railroad during the 1870s.

In the 1970s, Illinois Central Gulf (ICG), formed by the 1972 merger of Illinois Central and Gulf, Mobile & Ohio attempted to dispose of the Grenada District. An operating agreement with Amtrak, however, which required ICG (and later IC) to maintain the line in FRA Class 4 condition, prohibited abandonment. This kept the route open to passenger traffic, including Amtrak's City of New Orleans, until the agreement lapsed in 1995.

The early 1990s had the line operating with four Chicago–New Orleans piggyback trains (I-01, I-02, I-03, I-04). In 1995, I-03 and I-04 went off route into the Yazoo District; in 1996, I-04 was on the through freight MEFE (Memphis–Ferguson) temporarily; and in 1996, I-01 and I-02 were rerouted but still took occasional detours via the Grenada District. Before Amtrak ceased operation in 1995, the passenger trains were operating at 60 mph slow orders and the freight at 40 mph since maintenance had been postponed.

In January 1996, the line's speed limit was formally reduced to 40 mph. While CN acquired Illinois Central in 1998 and began preferentially using the flatter Yazoo District, some traffic remained. During 2003-2009, especially once the Nissan plant was operating in Canton, numerous empty auto rack trains traveled the Grenada District.

In the years prior to CN selling the line, numerous 25 mph slow orders began to accumulate, including one long 25 mph slow order between West, Mississippi, and Canton, Mississippi. Shortly after the Grenada Railway took over the line in 2009, the maximum speed was officially lowered to 25 mph, and it still is today.

=== Grenada Railway, 2009-2018 ===
The Grenada Railway was formed in 2009 when Canadian National spun off the 175-mile branch line from the Tennessee border south through Grenada to Canton due to low traffic. On May 14, 2009, the Grenada Star reported, "The Grenada Branch Line, the Water Valley Branch Line, and the Natchez Branch Line were sold to Grenada Railway, LLC, and Natchez Railway, LLC, both non-carrier affiliates of V&S Railway and A&K Railroad Materials." The 81-mile section running south from Grenada to Canton was taken out of service in 2011 and was the subject of a dispute between Grenada Railway, the local towns and the counties along the tracks and the Surface Transportation Board. GRYR claimed there was not enough traffic to justify keeping the line open, while the towns and counties bordering the tracks argued that abandoning the railroad would hurt them economically. The railroad eventually withdrew its application to abandon the trackage in November 2011.

In 2015, the North Central Mississippi Regional Railroad Authority purchased the entire rail line for $43 million from previous owner A&K Railroad Materials. The state of Mississippi contributed a $30 million bond, while Iowa Pacific Holdings paid the remaining $13 million. Iowa Pacific then leased the line from the Authority, the lease payments being applied to pay back the state bond. It was reported that Iowa Pacific would continue to operate the Grenada Railway, as well as work to rebuild the trackage between Grenada and Canton. Currently, tracks had been in use for car storage as far south as Winona, Mississippi.

In 2016 Iowa Pacific sent their passenger train (decorated in the colors of the Illinois Central) to Batesville, MS to run a polar express train. The train was such a success that Iowa Pacific bought a warehouse and planned to run regular dinner trains.

=== Grenada Railroad, 2018- ===
In August 2018 it was announced that International Rail Partners (IRP) had concluded a lease-purchase agreement with the NCMRRA, and would operate the line under the new name Grenada Railroad LLC.

Two months later in October, it was announced that IRP had partnered with Equity Group Investments in a $200 million deal to form a railroad holding subsidiary, RailUSA LLC; thus placing the Grenada Railroad in the group. They planned on continuing to upgrade the track to class 3 (40 MPH).

In November 2022 Grenada Railroad Receives 286K GWR Certification.

On April 27, 2023, Grenada Railroad LLC (GRR) announced it had bought Grenada Railway LLC (GRY) and it's 228-mile trackage.

In August 2023, the parent company of Grenada announced the celebration of the complete restoration of its 235-mile line that runs between Canton, Miss., and Memphis, Tenn.

In November 2024, Grenada Railroad will receive a $18.2 million grant for rail upgrades and expansion. This new grant will fund the upgrading and modernizing of the rail line from Canton, Mississippi, to Southaven, Mississippi, on the Mississippi-Tennessee border, and significantly increase capacity to support the rapid growth of industrial development in central Mississippi.

== The failed 2011 abandonment attempt ==
In September of 2011, Grenada Railway filed to abandon the line from Grenada, Mississippi, to Canton, Mississippi. Multiple towns protested, including the owner of Chicago, Rock Island and Pacific Railroad (2017). GRYR claimed the line had minimal traffic and substantial losses (on the order of $100,000 per year) on the southern segment. The proposed abandonment of the line caused immediate opposition from many people and places, including local governments, businesses, and elected officials, even all the way up to members of the U.S. Congress. Multiple People petitioned in 2012 for the abandonment application to be withdrawn, asserting that the claims of GRYR were false. The STB denied this in 2013 largely due to the fact that the opponents lacked definitive proof upon which to contest GRYR. Most notably at the time, the key papers, specifically a sale agreement dated 2009, had not yet been obtained, and the opposition was left scrambling to "connect the dots" without an apparent, fact-based basis. This concession may have been made during the discovery process, which was not pursued in the original challenge, as was later revealed. There was an opportunity for discovery in 2013, when GRYR submitted a second motion to abandon the same route. Through a motion for discovery in 2009, opponents were able to obtain access to the agreement of sale thanks to this second application. It was widely believed that the GRYR lawyers did not want the terms of this arrangement to be made public since doing so would seriously harm their case by potentially exposing plans that were incompatible with their abandoning goal. The state and local governments responded simultaneously to the threat of permanent abandonment. Simultaneously, local and state governments responded to the threat of perpetual abandonment. In 2013 and 2014, the North Central Mississippi Regional Railroad Authority (NCMRRA) was formed with the goal of keeping rail service in the region. Around the same time, Iowa Pacific Holdings committed to entering into a lease-purchase agreement with A&K Railroad Materials GRYR's parent company if public funding was secured to purchase the line. By 2015, these cooperative endeavors were fruitful. The line was officially preserved through a public-private partnership that allowed the NCMRRA to acquire the route with the assistance of federal and state sources of funding. The Grenada line remained in service under new ownership, averting abandonment and protecting the corridor for continued railroad use and economic development.

== Current operations ==
As of 2023, the Grenada District has been fully restored for freight service under the name Grenada Railroad, and major upgrades have been completed for 25 MPH and 286K on gross rails, and it is now working on a rail project that will replace all jointed rail with welded rail for greater speeds, and CN is potentially operating on it via trackage rights.

On July 6, 2025, Due to a derailment on the CN Yazoo Subdivision, a detoured CN train was forced to detour on the Grenada Railroad. However, the detoured train derailed close to Sardis, Mississippi, and half of the train traveled across the Grenada Railroad the next day.
