= Hondo Railway =

Overview
- Headquarters: Hondo, Texas
- Reporting mark: HRR
- Locale: South Texas
- Dates of operation: 2006–present

Technical
- Track gauge: 4 ft 8 1/2 in (1,435 mm) standard gauge

Hondo Railway (reporting mark HRR) is a Class III shortline railroad formed in 2006 that operates about 5 miles (8 km) of trackage near Hondo, Texas, about 30 miles west of San Antonio, Texas. It entered into a definitive agreement on August 20, 2024, subject to regulatory approval, to be acquired by short-line operator Pinsley Railroad.

Interchanging with Union Pacific Railroad, Hondo Railway carries ethanol, food, agricultural products and industrial products. Roughly half of its track (13,200 feet or 4 km) is terminal trackage leased from Texas Liquid Terminal, Inc.
