= Alabama International Airport Authority =

1990s U.S. state commission

The Alabama International Airport Authority was a commission designated with the task of developing a proposal for a new international airport within the state in the 1990s. The airport was envisioned to relieve air traffic from Atlanta's Hartsfield International Airport in addition to serving as a replacement for the existing Birmingham Airport. The $1.5 billion facility was to have seen its first phase complete and operational by 1999 but never received sufficient funding to be carried out.

== History ==
The idea of replacing the existing Birmingham International Airport first came to fruition in 1988 when then governor Guy Hunt proposed that the state build a new airport to serve as a replacement for the aging Birmingham facility. In 1991, the Alabama International Airport Authority was established by the state legislature with the purpose of developing both where the facility would be constructed as well as the method by which it would be constructed. The laws for establishing and running this Authority are in the Code of Alabama under Chapter 4-2A "Alabama International Airport Authority."

The authority was composed of ten citizens appointed by the governor, lieutenant governor, the speaker of the House of Representatives and by the mayors of Birmingham, Mobile, Montgomery, Huntsville and Dothan. William A. Bell was selected as Birmingham's representative by then mayor Richard Arrington, and by June 1993, Bell was named chairman of the authority.

In December 1992, the authority received an initial $800,000 grant from the FAA to formally begin the study for the proposed facility. Initially ten separate sites were evaluated as possible locations for the facility. The selections were then narrowed down to two sites as possible locations for the airport. The first was located in Chilton County near Buxahatchee and the second was located in St. Clair County near Gadsden. By July 1993, the existing Birmingham Airport also emerged as a possibility for the new facility through an aggressive expansion plan.

In July 1994, governor Jim Folsom announced that the St. Clair site was chosen as the site for the proposed airport.

By 1995 the authority had developed a master plan for the St. Clair site. Located between Steele and Rainbow City the plan called for a two runway facility with a 21-gate terminal at an initial cost of $470 million. Additionally, the plan also envisioned an expansion of two additional runways and expansion of the terminal to 125 gates at a cost of $996 million by 2015. It was estimated that the completed facility would generate tax revenues in excess of $96 million in addition to the creation of 47,000 jobs.

In May 1995, the FAA denied the authority additional funding stating that there was no current need for a new or expanded international airport within the state. Without funding from the FAA, the proposal for the facility essentially died with the authority being out of operation by the early 2000s.

== Proposed Birmingham facility ==
The proposed expansion of the Birmingham Airport would have resulted in the displacement of over 2,000 residents businesses, churches and other facilities to complete. Its expansion would have resulted in the acquisition of much of present-day East Lake to the northeast of the existing facility. As part of the envisioned expansion, 1st Avenue North would have to be tunneled underneath the expanded runway. Additionally, East Lake Park would be a casualty of the expansion in addition to the relocation of the Putnam Water Plant and the clean-up of a former landfill site for construction to commence on the expansion.

== Proposed Buxahatchee facility ==
The proposed Buxahatchee facility would have resulted in the displacement of 20 residences, several older churches, cemeteries and other structures to complete. It would have been located 12 miles to the northeast of Clanton accessible from Interstate 65.

== See also ==
- Birmingham-Shuttlesworth International Airport
