= AirMed International =

Air ambulance service

- Formerly: MEDjet
- Industry: Airline
- Founded: 1987
- Key people: Denise M. Treadwell (President); Darby Wix (Vice President of Aviation Operations); Brandon Bates (Sr. Director of Global Strategy & Partner Relations; Amber Payne-Gregory (Director of Medical Operations)

AirMed International, LLC, based in Birmingham, Alabama, is an FAA-approved fee-for-service air ambulance airline. AirMed holds accreditation from the Commission on Accreditation of Medical Transport Systems (CAMTS) and the European Aero-medical Institute, and is an accredited service provider with the International Assistance Group (IAG).

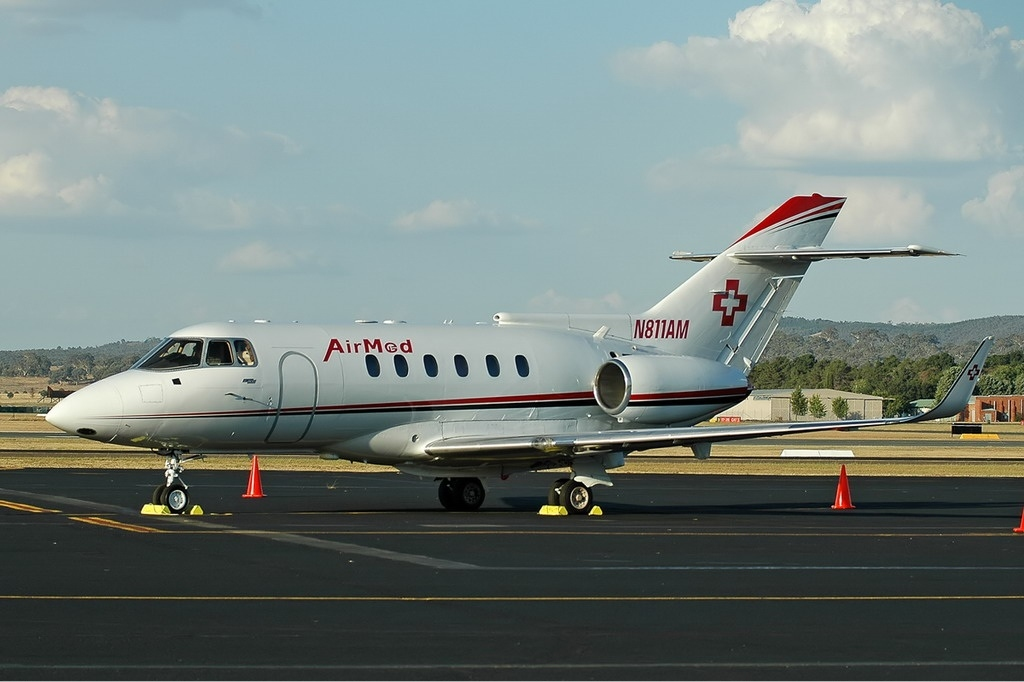
Hawker 800 at Canberra Airport (2006).

== History ==
The company was founded in 1987 as MEDjet International and was renamed AirMed International in 2003. AirMed offers international service to all countries except for Iraq, North Korea, and Libya.

In 2017, the company acquired the ambulance medical company Air Medical.

The University of Alabama at Birmingham School of Nursing and Airmed entered a partnership in 2018 to give nurses and other healthcare providers the opportunity to participate in simulated trainings that will help prepare them for real-world scenarios.

AirMed is a contracted carrier for the U.S. Department of Defense. AirMed is a member of the Association of Air Medical Services (AAMS), and created an air ambulance industry website, weatherturndown.com, allowing medical transport programs to share current information regarding delays or cancellations due to weather or other hazards.

AirMed sells a pre-paid air ambulance membership for individuals and families.

In 2011, AirMed International was named Official Air Ambulance of INDYCAR, the Izod IndyCar Series and Firestone Indy Lights.

In 2022, AirMed partnered with Wheels Up Experience Inc. to bring medical services to Wheels Up members and families.

== Awards and recognition ==
In 2011, AirMed became a finalist for the award, Air Ambulance Provider of the Year, presented by the International Travel Insurance Journal. In 2017, Airmed received the Fixed Wing Award of Excellence.

== Hubs ==
- Birmingham-Shuttlesworth International Airport, Birmingham, Alabama (Main Hub): Base of international operations, and AirMed's two Hawker 800A aircraft.
- San Antonio, Texas: In March 2017, AirMed acquired Air Medical of San Antonio, Texas.
- Las Vegas, NV
- Ypsilanti, MI
- Mississauga, Ontario

== Fleet ==
Aircraft in the Airmed International fleet are as follows;

- Hawker 800A (1)
- Hawker 800XP (5)
- Beechjet 400 (1)
- Beechcraft B200 (1)
- Beechcraft C90B (3)
- Cessna 550 Citation Bravo (1)
- Nextant 400XTi (1)
- Beechcraft 400A (1)
- Bombardier Challenger 601

=== Medical capabilities ===
The long-range Hawker jets are equipped with a liquid oxygen system (LOX), allowing for longer transport of ventilator-dependent patients without the need to replenish on-board oxygen supply. AirMed's Hawker aircraft have the capability of transporting two patients simultaneously. The company's aeromedical crews perform neonatal, pediatric and adult transports, in addition to highly specialized ECMO transports.
