= Pinsly Railroad Company (2024) =

American short line railroad holding company

- Formerly: Gulf & Atlantic Railways ^{(2023-2024)} RailUSA ^{(2018-2023)}
- Industry: Rail transport
- Founded: October 2018
- Headquarters: Jacksonville, Florida, United States
- Area served: Florida, Mississippi, Indiana, Illinois, Massachusetts, Ohio
- Parent: Macquarie Infrastructure Partners
- Subsidiaries: Florida Gulf & Atlantic Railroad; Grenada Railroad; Chesapeake & Indiana Railroad; Camp Chase Railroad; Vermilion Valley Railroad; Pioneer Valley Railroad; Hondo Railway
- Website: pinsly.com

Pinsly Railroad Company is an American short line railroad holding company, that owns and operates 6 railroads in the United States. Formerly known as Gulf & Atlantic Railways, the company rebranded to Pinsly Railroad Company on March 1, 2024. Pinsly has a rail network of 767 miles.

== History ==
The original Pinsly Railroad Company dated back to 1938 and is one of the oldest short-line holding companies in U.S. history. Today's Pinsly was founded as RailUSA in October 2018 by private equity firm Equity Group Investments.

RailUSA first purchased the Grenada Railroad from Iowa Pacific with plans to restore and re-open the 87-mile southern portion of the line, which had been closed since 2011. Another investment followed in 2019 with the purchase of Florida Gulf & Atlantic Railroad from CSX.

In April 2022, RailUSA was purchased by Macquarie Infrastructure Partners. On March 1, 2023, RailUSA announced they would relocate to Jacksonville, Florida, and change their name to Gulf & Atlantic Railways, showing focus on new growth.

In May 2023, G&AR acquired 3 small railroads from Midwestern & Bluegrass Rail, the Camp Chase Railroad, Chesapeake & Indiana Railroad and Vermilion Valley Railroad, and increased its portfolio from two to five short lines. In August 2023, Macquarie Infrastructure Partners reached an agreement with the Pinsly Railroad Company to acquire a 6th short-line, Pioneer Valley Railroad, through its subsidiary Gulf & Atlantic Railways. This acquisition also included a warehousing company, Railroad Distribution Services. Towards the end of 2023, G&AR announced they would acquire the Northern Indiana Railroad Company (NIRC), which maintained the land assets of the Chesapeake & Indiana Railroad (CKIN).

In February 2024, G&AR announced they would seek to merge NIRC into the CKIN. On May 1, 2024, the company rebranded to Pinsly Railroad Company. On August 20, 2024, they entered into a definitive agreement, subject to regulatory approval, to acquire Hondo Railway.

In January 2025, Pinsly's newly formed North Florida Industrial Railroad was chosen to be the rail operator of the North Florida Mega Industrial Park.

In October 2025, RailwayAge announced Pinsly will operate a 36-mile line, formerly operated by Genesee & Wyoming's Three Notch Railway that connects to CSX at Georgiana, Ala., and goes to Andalusia, Alabama. Towards the end of January 2026, Pinsly completed a 6 million dollar rehabilitation of the line.

On September 18 2026, it was announced that Pinsly was to acquire the Kankakee, Beaverville and Southern Railroad from the Stroo family.

== Railroads ==
Name	Mark	Class	Holding	Trackage	State(s)	Notes
Grenada Railroad	GRYR	III	Acquired - 2018^{a}	235.8 mi (379.5 km)	MS	
Florida Gulf and Atlantic Railroad	FGA	III	Acquired - 2019^{a}	438.1 mi (705.1 km)	FL	
Camp Chase Railway	CAMY	III	Acquired - May 2023^{a}	17.1 mi (27.5 km)	OH	
Chesapeake & Indiana Railroad	CKIN	III	Acquired - May 2023^{a}	34.9 mi (56.2 km)	IN	
Vermilion Valley Railroad	VVRR	III	Acquired - May 2023^{a}	9.3 mi (15.0 km)	IN/IL	
Pioneer Valley Railroad	PVRR	III	Acquired - Aug. 2023^{a}	27 mi (43 km)	MA	
Hondo Railway	HRR	III	Acquired - Aug 2024^{a}	5 mi (8.0 km)	TX	
Georgianna & Andalusia Railroad	GARR	III	Acquired - Oct 2025^{a}	36 mi (58 km)	AL	Assets of former Three Notch Railway
North Florida Industrial Railroad		III	Acquired - Jan 2025^{a}	1 mi (1.6 km)	FL	Rail spur off FGA connecting to N. Florida Mega Industrial Park
Kankakee, Beaverville and Southern Railroad	KBSR	III	Acquired - Sept 2026^{a}	160 mi (260 km)	IN/IL	
