= Caddo Valley Railroad =

Short-line railroad in Arkansas, US

Overview
- Headquarters: Glenwood, Arkansas
- Reporting mark: CVYR
- Locale: Arkansas

Technical
- Track gauge: 4 ft 8 1/2 in (1,435 mm) standard gauge

Caddo Valley Railroad (reporting mark CVYR) is a short-line railroad headquartered in Glenwood, Arkansas.

CVYR operates a 52-mile line in Arkansas from Gurdon, Arkansas, (where it interchanges with Union Pacific) to Bird Mill, Arkansas.

The line was first owned by Missouri Pacific, a predecessor of Union Pacific, and was sold to Arkansas Midland Railroad (AKMD) in 1992, then in 2000 sold by AKMD to its present owners under a sale ordered by the Surface Transportation Board.

CVYR and AKMD are involved in a controversy regarding a planned sale of CVYR to Pioneer, a shortline operator. AKMD claims that, under the provisions of the sale, before the line can be sold to another party, AKMD must be given the first opportunity to repurchase it. A hearing was pending in May 2006.

In September 2010, Bean Lumber of Glenwood, AR (the main customer & owner of the line) closed its doors. The CVYR has not provided service since that time. A rail has been rolled near the Highway 53 crossing, and a red flag rendering the line out of service beyond that point.

Arkansas Midland has been providing service between the UP interchange and Highway 53 (northwest of town) to service the Georgia-Pacific saw mill on US Highway 67 (US 67). MM GP10 #7530, presumably owned by the Caddo Valley, remains in unserviceable condition at the old open air shop in Antoine, Arkansas. Supposedly everything has been sold to a scrapper.
