= Mississippi and Tennessee Railroad =

American railroad

Overview
- Locale: Mississippi, Tennessee, United States
- Dates of operation: 1852–1886
- Successor: Illinois Central Railroad

Technical
- Length: 97 miles (156 km)

The Mississippi and Tennessee Railroad was an American railroad constructed in the 1850s, connecting Memphis, Tennessee, with Grenada, Mississippi. In Grenada, the line connected with the Mississippi Central Railroad.

== History ==
The railroad was incorporated on October 16, 1852, and enabled cotton plantations in the Mississippi Delta to ship their product to Memphis, where it was loaded onto steamboats and transported to New Orleans.

The city of Batesville, Mississippi, founded following the construction of the railway, drew its residents from surrounding communities.

During the Civil War, the railroad's trestle over the Coldwater River was destroyed by federal troops. Following the war, the railroad was "a complete wreck, and literally without rolling stock".

The railroad was purchased in 1886 by the Illinois Central Railroad.

== Current use ==
The line is currently used by the Grenada Railway.
