= List of reporting marks: C =

Note: Marks ending in U are for container owners; marks ending in X are not common carriers; marks ending in Z are for trailers without flanged wheels. All other marks are of common-carrier railroads.

== C ==
- CA - Chesapeake and Albemarle Railroad
- CABU - Bacardi and Company, Ltd.
- CABX - Cabot Corporation
- CACV - Cooperstown and Charlotte Valley Railroad
- CACZ - Comacasa Line
- CAD - Cadiz Railroad
- CADX - Cando Corporation
- CAEG - Coffeen and Western Railroad (subsidiary of Ameren)
- CAFU - Bay Cities Leasing Company
- CAGX - MHC, Inc. (subsidiary of ConAgra)
- CAGY - Columbus and Greenville Railway
- CAGZ - Columbus and Greenville Railway
- CAIX - Cominco American, Inc.; CAI Rail, Inc.
- CALA - Carolina Southern Railroad
- CALX - California Railcar Corporation
- CAMX - Canamax Commodity Corporation
- CAMY - Camp Chase Railway
- CANX - CANAC International, Inc.
- CAOX - Westlake CA and O
- CAPX - TransAlta Utilities Corporation
- CARR - Carrollton Railroad
- CARX - Carlon; Lamson and Sessions
- CARZ - Anton Caraton and Son
- CASO - Canada Southern Railway; New York Central Railroad; Penn Central; Canadian Pacific Railway
- CATU - CATU Containers, SA
- CAXU - Container Applications International, Inc.
- CBC - Carbon County Railway; Chemin de fer Baie des Chaleurs
- CBCX - Colonial Brick Company, Inc.
- CBFX - CIT Group/Capital Finance, Inc.
- CBGR - Council Bluffs Railway; Great Western Railway of Iowa
- CBHU - China Ocean Shipping Company
- CBIU - Combi Line-Lash
- CBIX - Central Bi-Products
- CBL - Conemaugh and Black Lick Railroad
- CBLU - Cooper Brothers Containers, Ltd.
- CBNS - Cape Breton and Central Nova Scotia Railway
- CBPU - CBSL Transportation Services, Ltd.
- CBQ - Chicago, Burlington and Quincy Railroad; Burlington Northern Railway; Burlington Northern and Santa Fe Railway; BNSF Railway
- CBQZ - Chicago, Burlington and Quincy Railroad; Burlington Northern Railway; Burlington Northern and Santa Fe Railway; BNSF Railway
- CBRM - Chillicothe-Brunswick Rail Maintenance Authority
- CBRW - Columbia Basin Railroad
- CBRX - Charles Barthoid
- CBRY - Copper Basin Railway
- CBTX - Central Bi-Products
- CBYN - Crosbyton Railway
- CC - Chicago Central and Pacific Railroad
- CCAX - FDJ Leasing
- CCBX - Union Carbide Corporation
- CCC - Clinchfield Coal Corporation
- CCCL - Connecticut Central Railroad
- CCCU - Compass Container Company, Inc.
- CCCX - Carondelet Coke Corporation
- CCCZ - Compass Container Company, Inc.
- CCDX - Dayton Power and Light Company
- CCET - Cincinnati East Terminal Railway
- CCEZ - Chicago Central and Pacific Railroad
- CCFG - Chemin de fer Gaspésie
- CCFZ - Chi-Can Freight Forwarding
- CCGX - Cando Contracting, Ltd.
- CCHX - Columbian Chemicals Canada, Ltd.
- CCIM - Corpus Christi Terminal Railroad
- CCIX - Stauffer Chemical Company (Consolidated Chemical Division)
- CCIZ - Crete Intermodal
- CCKX - California Contemporary, Inc.; CCKX, Inc.
- CCKY - Chattooga and Chickamauga Railway
- CCLU - Char Ching Shipping (USA), Ltd.
- CCLX - Crystal Car Lines
- CCMX - Calcium Carbonate Company
- CCPR - Chelatchie Prairie Railroad
- CCPX - Canadian Chemical Producers
- CCQX - Construction Carrier, Inc.
- CCR - Corinth and Counce Railroad; Kansas City Southern Railway
- CCRR - Claremont Concord Railroad
- CCRU - Compagnie Des Containers Reservoir
- CCRX - Coastal Refining and Marketing, Inc.
- CCRY - Charles City Railway
- CCRZ - Kansas City Southern Railway
- CCSU - Trans Ocean, Ltd.
- CCT - Central California Traction Company
- CCTU - Coordinated Caribbean Transport, Inc.
- CCTX - Central Power and Light Company
- CCTZ - Crowley Maritime Corporation
- CCUO - Chicago-Chemung Railroad
- CCWX - Coastal Chem, Inc.
- CCX - Columbian Chemicals Company
- CCXU - Char Ching Shipping (USA), Ltd.
- CCXX - Costain Coal, Inc.
- CDAC - Canadian American Railroad; Bangor and Aroostook Railroad; Montreal, Maine and Atlantic
- CDAU - Canadian Tire Corporation Ltd.
- CDAZ - Canadian Tire Corporation Ltd.
- CDCX - Air Liquide America Corporation
- CDEX - Coastal Distribution, LLC
- CDGX - Carolinas Domestic Gas Company, Inc.; Chatham Oil Company
- CDHX - Caledonian Rail Lines, LLC
- CDLZ - Cardinal Freight Carriers
- CDNU - Carotrans International
- CDPX - Chevron USA, Inc.
- CDTX - California Department of Transportation (Amtrak California)
- CDVX - Caddo Valley Railcar Repair, Inc.
- CEBX - Combustion Engineering, Inc.
- CEDR - Cedar River Railroad
- CEFX - CIT Group/Capital Finance, Inc.
- CEI - Chicago and Eastern Illinois Railroad; Missouri Pacific Railroad; Union Pacific Railroad
- CEIW - Central Indiana and Western Railroad
- CELX - Celtran, Inc.
- CEMR - Central Manitoba Railway
- CEMX - Cementos Mexicanos, SA; Cemex Mexico, SA de CV
- CENX - Western Aggregates, Inc.
- CEPX - Cajun Electric Power Cooperative, Inc.; Trinity Industries Leasing
- CERA - Central Railroad Company of Indianapolis
- CERX - Carpenter Chemical Company; ER Carpenter, LLP
- CETU - Custom Environmental Transport, Inc.
- CEWX - Canadian Enterprise Gas Products
- CF - Cape Fear Railway
- CFC - Chemin de fer Charlevoix
- CFE - Chicago, Fort Wayne and Eastern
- CFKZ - XTRA Intermodal
- CFL - Chemin de fer Lanaudière
- CFLX - Crestbrook Forest Industries
- CFM - Chemin de fer de Matapédia et du Golfe
- CFMG - Chemin de Fer de Matapédia et Gaspésie
- CFMX - Cargill, Inc.
- CFNR - California Northern Railroad
- CFO - Ottawa Central Railway
- CFPX - GE Railcar Services Corporation
- CFQC - Quebec Central Railway
- CFRR - Chemin de fer Rivière Romaine
- CFRU - Cardinal Freight Carriers
- CFS - Sartigan Railway
- CFSX - C and T Refinery, Inc.
- CFTX - Canadian Fertilizers, Ltd.
- CFWR - Caney Fork and Western Railway
- CG - Central of Georgia Railway; Norfolk Southern Railway
- CGA - Central of Georgia Railway; Norfolk Southern Railway
- CGAX - Cargill, Inc. (C.G.D. Division)
- CGBX - Procor, Ltd.; Dow Chemical Canada, Inc.
- CGCX - Continental Grain Company
- CGDX - Country Gas Distributors, Inc.; Eastern Propane Gas
- CGEX - Canadian General Electric Company, Ltd.; Cargill, Inc.
- CGFX - Consolidated Gas Company of Florida
- CGLX - Canadian General Transit; General American Train Company
- CGMU - Compagnie Generale Maritime
- CGMX - GATX Rail Canada Corporation
- CGMZ - Compagnie Generale Maritime
- CGNE - Champagne Railroad, Inc.
- CGOX - Cargill, Inc.
- CGR - CG Railway
- CGRX - Consolidated Grain and Barge Company
- CGRY - Carrizo Gorge Railway, Inc.
- CGSX - Proflame Incorporated
- CGT - Canada and Gulf Terminal Railway
- CGTU - Compagnie Generale Maritime
- CGTX - Canadian General Transit; General American Train Company
- CGW - Chicago Great Western Railway; Chicago and North Western Railway; Union Pacific Railroad
- CHAT - Chattahoochee and Gulf Railroad
- CHAU - Combined Transport Group, Inc.
- CHAX - Chartrand's Tank Car Service, Inc.
- CHEX - Chemplex Company; Equistar Chemicals
- CHFU - Challenge International
- CHH - Cheswick and Harmar
- CHIU - Chimco - Bulgaria
- CHLX - Chemleco, Inc.
- CHMX - C. H. Masland and Sons; First Union Rail
- CHOX - Sugar Express
- CHP - Ferrocarril de Chihuahua al Pacifico, SA de CV; Ferrocarriles Nacionales de Mexico
- CHR - Chestnut Ridge Railway
- CHRC - Chaparral Railroad
- CHRR - Chesapeake Railroad
- CHRX - Chesapeake Railway Association; previously the Chesapeake Division, Railroad Enthusiasts, Inc. until 1 Dec 1999.
- CHS - Charlotte Southern Railroad
- CHSX - Cenex Harvest States Cooperative
- CHSZ - Intermodal Services, Inc.
- CHTS - Penn Eastern Rail Lines, Inc.
- CHTT - Chicago Heights Terminal Transfer Railroad; Missouri Pacific Railroad; Union Pacific Railroad
- CHV - Chattahoochee Valley Railway
- CHVX - Chevron Chemical Company
- CHW - Chesapeake Western Railway; Norfolk Southern
- CI - Cambria and Indiana Railroad
- CIBX - CIT Group/Capital Finance, Inc.
- CIC - Cedar Rapids and Iowa City Railway (Crandic)
- CIGX - CIT Group/Capital Finance, Inc.
- CIIX - Contico International, Inc.
- CIM - Chicago and Illinois Midland Railway
- CIND - Central Railroad Company of Indiana
- CIPX - Central Illinois Public Service Company; Ameren Energy Generating Company
- CIR - City of Rochelle, Illinois
- CIRR - Chattahoochee Industrial Railroad
- CIRX - Consbec, Inc.
- CIRY - Central Illinois Railroad
- CISD - Colonel's Island Railroad
- CITU - Cincinnati Union Terminal
- CITX - CIT Group/Capital Finance, Inc.
- CIW - Illinois Central Gulf; Illinois Central Railroad; Canadian National Railway
- CIWN - Cincinnati, Indianapolis and Western Railroad
- CIXX - Calciner Industries, Inc.
- CJPX - General Electric Rail Services Corporation
- CKIN - Chesapeake and Indiana Railroad
- CKIX - C.K. Industries
- CKP - Colorado Kansas and Pacific Railway
- CKRR - Cumberland and Knox Railroad
- CKRY - Kansas and Oklahoma Railroad
- CKSI - Carthage Knightstown and Shirley Railroad
- CL&N - Cincinnati, Lebanon and Northern Railway
- CLC - Columbia and Cowlitz Railway
- CLCO - Claremont and Concord Railway
- CLCX - Union Oil Company of California; Chattahoochee Locomotive Company
- CLCZ - Complete Logistics Company
- CLDZ - Celadon Trucking Services, Inc.
- CLEX - Chemical Enterprises, Inc.; Cieco Corporation
- CLGR - Central Louisiana and Gulf Railroad
- CLGU - Costa Line Cargo Services
- CLIF - Cliffside Railroad
- CLIX - Calumet Lubricants
- CLK - Cadillac and Lake City Railway
- CLMX - Consolidated Thompson Iron Mines Limited
- CLNA - Carolina Coastal Railway
- CLOU - CLOU Container Leasing, GmbH
- CLOX - Clark Refining and Marketing, Inc.
- CLP - Clarendon and Pittsford Railroad
- CLPX - Boulder Scientific Company
- CLPZ - Clarendon and Pittsford Railroad
- CLRX - Clayton Rail
- CLSL - Columbia and Silver Creek Railroad
- CLSX - Cargill (Salt Division)
- CLTU - Chemical Leaman Tank Lines, Inc.
- CLTX - Cloro de Tehuantepec, SA de CV
- CM - Central Montana Rail
- CMBU - CMB, SA
- CMC - CMC Railroad, Inc.
- CMCU - Crowley Maritime Corporation
- CMCX - Sweetman Construction Company
- CMCZ - Crowley Maritime Corporation
- CMDX - Cargill, Inc.
- CMER - Curtis, Milburn and Eastern Railroad
- CMEX - CEMEX, Inc.
- CMG - Chicago, Milwaukee and Gary Railway
- CMGN - Central Michigan Railway
- CMHX - CarMath, Inc.
- CMIX - Consolidated Minerals, Inc.
- CMLU - Containers Marine Lines (Division of American Export Lines)
- CMLX - Craggy Mountain Line, Inc.
- CMLZ - Containers Marine Lines Isbrandtsen
- CMMU - Medcontainers
- CMO - Chicago, St. Paul, Minneapolis and Omaha Railway; Chicago and North Western Railway; Union Pacific Railroad
- CMPA - Madison Railroad Division of City of Madison Port Authority
- CMPU - Complete Logistics Company
- CMQ - Central Maine and Quebec Railway
- CMR - Central Midland Railway Company
- CMRX - The Chemours Company, LLC
- CMSX - Cape May Seashore Lines
- CMSN - Crowley Marine Services
- CMU - Columbus Charter Service
- CMUU - Canada Maritime Agencies Limited
- CMWX - Chateau Martin Wine
- CN - Canadian National Railway
- CNA - Canadian National Railway
- CNAZ - Grand Trunk Western Railroad; Canadian National Railway
- CNCX - Columbia Nitrogen Corporation
- CNDX - Connecticut Department of Transportation
- CNE - Central New England Railway; New York, New Haven and Hartford Railroad
- CNEU - Canadian National Railway
- CNEZ - Canadian National Railway
- CNGU - Sicng (Ind. Chim. Du Nord de la Grece SA)
- CNGX - CONAG Finance, Inc.
- CNHX - Ontario Hydro; Ontario Power Generation
- CNIS - Canadian National Railway
- CNJ - Central Railroad of New Jersey; Norfolk Southern
- CNL - Columbia, Newberry and Laurens Railroad; Atlantic Coast Line Railroad; CSX Transportation
- CNLX - CANAC International
- CNMZ - Norfolk Southern
- CNNU - Compania Nacional de Nabegacao
- CNOR - Cincinnati Northern Railroad
- CNOW - Columbia and Northern Railway
- CNOX - Shell Canada, Ltd.
- CNoR - Canadian Northern Railway
- CNPU - Canadian National Railway
- CNPZ - Canadian National Railway
- CNQ - Canadian National Railway End Of Train Devices
- CNRR - California Northern Railroad
- CNRU - Canadian National Railway
- CNRX - Canadian National Railway
- CNRZ - Canadian National Railway
- CNSM - Chicago North Shore and Milwaukee Railroad
- CNSX - Consolidated Oil and Transportation Company, Inc.
- CNTP - Cincinnati, New Orleans and Texas Pacific Railway
- CNTX - Continental Tank Car Corporation
- CNUR - C&NC Railroad
- CNVX - Convoyeur National, Inc.
- CNW - Chicago and North Western Railway; Union Pacific Railroad
- CNWS - Chicago and North Western Railway
- CNWX - Canadian Wheat Board
- CNWZ - Chicago and North Western Railway; Union Pacific Railroad
- CNYK - Central New York Railroad
- CNYX - Central New York Locomotive Company
- CNZR - Central New England Railroad
- CO - Chesapeake and Ohio Railway; Chessie System; CSX Transportation
- COAX - Trinity Rail Management, Inc.
- COBX - Cobre Mining Company, Ltd.
- COCX - Chevron Oronite Company LLC
- COE - Colorado and Eastern Railroad
- COEH - Conecuh Valley Railroad
- COER - Crab Orchard and Egyptian Railroad
- COEZ - Crab Orchard and Egyptian Railroad
- COLX - Alliant Energy
- COMX - Commonwealth Edison Company
- CONU - Contrans
- CONX - Conoco Inc.
- COOK - Cook Transit
- COOX - Cooperative Producers, Inc.; First Union Rail
- COP - City of Prineville Railway
- COPX - CanadianOxy Industrial Chemicals, LP
- CORP - Central Oregon and Pacific Railroad
- CORU - CATU Containers, SA
- CORX - Coors Brewing Company
- COSU - China Ocean Steamship, Ltd.
- COSX - Cabot Corporation (CAB-O-SIL Division)
- COTX - Consolidated Transportation Corporation; GLNX Corporation
- COZ - CSX Transportation
- CP - Canadian Pacific Railway
- CPAA - Canadian Pacific Railway
- CPAX - CITGO Petroleum Corporation
- CPBU - Soo Line; Canadian Pacific Railway
- CPBZ - Soo Line; Canadian Pacific Railway
- CPCX - Chevron Phillips Chemical Company
- CPDR - South Carolina Central Railroad (Carolina Piedmont Division); Carolina Piedmont Railway
- CPDU - Delaware and Hudson Railway
- CPDX - Chevron USA, Inc.
- CPDZ - Delaware and Hudson Railway
- CPGZ - ContainerPort Group, Inc.
- CPHX - Ontario Hydro; Ontario Power Generation
- CPI - Canadian Pacific Railway
- CPIX - Continental Polymers, Inc.; ICI Acrylics, Inc.
- CPKC - Canadian Pacific Kansas City
- CPLJ - Camp Lejeune Railroad
- CPLT - Camino, Placerville and Lake Tahoe Railroad
- CPLX - CPLX Leasing
- CPMY - Coopersville and Marne Railway
- CPOX - Consumers Power Company
- CPPU - Canadian Pacific Railway
- CPPX - Consolidated Papers, Inc.
- CPPZ - Canadian Pacific Railway
- CPR - CaterParrott Railnet
- CPRS - Canadian Pacific Railway
- CPRX - Carolina Power and Light Company
- CPRZ - Canadian Pacific Railway
- CPSX - Commercial Plastics Systems, Inc.
- CPSU - CP Ships; Hapag Lloyd
- CPT - Canadian Pacific Railway end of train devices
- CPVU - Containers and Pressure Vessels, Ltd.
- CPWX - Canadian Wheat Board
- CQPA - Central Columbiana and Pennsylvania Railway
- CR - Norfolk Southern
- CRAX - Crystal Hopper Associates
- CRAZ - Cornucopia Transportation, Inc.
- CRCR - Crete Carrier Corporation
- CRCX - Conrail Shared Assets Operations - Legal Name: Conrail
- CRCZ - Norfolk Southern
- CRDX - Chicago Freight Car Leasing Company
- CREU - Canadian Retail Shippers Association
- CREX - Merchants Investment Company; Citicorp Railmark, Inc.
- CREZ - Canadian Retail Shippers Association
- CRGX - Cargill, Inc.
- CRIJ - Carolina Rail Services, Inc.
- CRIX - GE Railcar Services Corporation; Citicorp Railmark, Inc.
- CRL - Chicago Rail Link
- CRLE - Coe Rail, Inc.
- CRLU - Carlisle Leasing International
- CRLX - Canadian Railserve, Ltd.
- CRMU - Norfolk Southern
- CRMX - The Cropmate Company
- CRMZ - Norfolk Southern
- CRN - Carolina and Northwestern Railway; Norfolk Southern
- CRNX - Coffeyville Resources Nitrogen Fertilizers, LLC
- CROX - Sylvachem Corporation
- CRP - Central Railroad of Pennsylvania; Norfolk Southern
- CRPU - Norfolk Southern
- CRPX - Centennial Gas Liquids
- CRQU - Norfolk Southern
- CRR - Clinchfield Railroad; Seaboard System Railroad; CSX Transportation
- CRRR - Copper Range Refrigerator
- CRRX - Cañon City and Royal Gorge Railroad, LLC
- CRSX - Cost Rail Service
- CRTZ - Norfolk Southern
- CRXU - Cronos Containers (UK)
- CRYX - Cryo-Trans, Inc.
- CRZ - Norfolk Southern
- CS, CX - Colorado and Southern Railway; Burlington Northern Railway; Burlington Northern and Santa Fe Railway; BNSF Railway
- CSAU - Costa Line
- CSBX - Cargill (Salt Division)
- CSCD - Cascade and Columbia River Railroad
- CSCX - Oglebay Norton; Coal Supply Corporation
- CSDX - Metropolitan Water Reclamation District of Greater Chicago
- CSGX - Central Sand and Gravel Company
- CSKR - C and S Railroad
- CSKU - Consolidated Services, Inc.
- CSL - Chicago Short Line Railway
- CSMX - Carol and Andy Muller
- CSNX - Cities Service Oil and Gas Corporation; Trident NGL, Inc.
- CSO - Connecticut Southern Railroad
- CSOR - Connecticut Southern Railroad
- CSOX - CITGO Petroleum Corporation
- CSP - Camas Prairie RailNet
- CSPX - Chesapeake Speciality Products; Cities Service Company
- CSRX - Conway Scenic Railroad
- CSRZ - CSX Transportation
- CSS - Chicago South Shore and South Bend Railroad
- CSTX - Canadian Starch Company (Casco)
- CSUX - City of Colorado Springs Department of Electric Generation
- CSVU - Compania Sud Americana de Vapores, GmbH
- CSWX - Central and South West Services, Inc.
- CSX - Central Transportation Company, Inc.
- CSXE - CSX Transportation End Of Train Devices
- CSXT - CSX Transportation
- CSXU - CSX Transportation
- CSXZ - CSX Transportation
- CSYX - Central Soya
- CT - Columbia Terminal Railroad
- CTCU - Container Trading Company
- CTCX - GE Railcar Services Corporation; Endasa, SA de CV
- CTE - Cen-Tex Rail Link
- CTEU - Spanish Lines
- CTEX - Canterra Energy, Ltd.; PLM International, Inc.
- CTGZ - Combined Transport Group, Inc.
- CTIE - Kansas City Southern Railway
- CTIU - CTI-Container Transport International, Inc.
- CTIX - Southeastern Industrial Enterprises, Inc.
- CTIZ - CTI-Container Transport International, Inc.
- CTKU - Container Tank Services, Ltd.
- CTLX - Endasa, SA de CV
- CTML - Cairo Terminal Railroad
- CTN - Canton Railroad
- CTNX - Continental Carbon
- CTOU - Chem-Rail Logistics, LLC
- CTPX - Certain Teed Corporation; Courtesy Corporation
- CTR - Clinton Terminal Railroad; Carlton Trail Railway
- CTRN - Central of Tennessee Railway and Navigation Company
- CTRR - Cloquet Terminal Railroad
- CTRU - Container Trading Company
- CTRW - Carlton Trail Railway
- CTRX - C and T Refinery, Inc.
- CTSU - Bibby Bros Company
- CTSX - CTS Cement Manufacturing, Inc. (Chem Comp Systems)
- CTSZ - Carotrans International
- CTTX - TTX Company
- CTUU - Container Trading Company
- CTVX - Cleveland Terminal and Valley Railway
- CTWU - Container Trading Company
- CTZZ - Continental Transportation Company
- CUEX - Colorado-Utility Electric Association
- CUOH - Columbus and Ohio River Rail Road
- CURB - Curtis Bay Railroad
- CUST - Chicago Union Station Company
- CUT - Cincinnati Union Terminal
- CUVA - Cuyahoga Valley Railway; ISG Cleveland Works Railway
- CV - Central Vermont Railway; Grand Trunk Western; Canadian National Railway
- CVC - Central Vermont Railway; Canadian National Railway
- CVQ - Grand Trunk Western Railroad; Canadian National Railway
- CVR - Cimarron Valley Railroad
- CVRX - Locomotive and Tower Preservation Fund, Ltd.
- CVRY - Caddo Valley Railroad
- CVRZ - Grand Trunk Western Railroad; Canadian National Railway
- CVSR - Cuyahoga Valley Scenic Railroad
- CVYR - Caddo Valley Railroad
- CW - Colorado and Wyoming Railway
- CWBX - C. W. Brooks, Inc.
- CWCX - Canandaigua Wine Company, Inc.
- CWCY - Caldwell County Railroad
- CWEX - Commonwealth Edison Company; Midwest Generation, LLC
- CWI - Chicago and Western Indiana Railroad
- CWIU - Con-Way Intermodal
- CWIZ - Con-Way Intermodal
- CWMX - Chemical Waste Management, Inc.
- CWP - Chicago, West Pullman and Southern Railroad; Chicago Rail Link
- CWR - California Western Railroad; CWR, Inc.
- CWRC - Central Wisconsin Railroad
- CWRL - Central Western Railway
- CWRO - Cleveland Works Railway
- CWRX - CWR Transportation Co.
- CWRY - Commonwealth Railway
- CWRZ - Providence and Worcester Railroad
- CWSX - USS Fabrication Division (United States Steel Corporation)
- CWTX - ChemWest Industries, Inc.
- CWTZ - Con-Way Truckload Services
- CXCZ - CSX Lines, LLC
- CXIX - Chemical Exchange Industries, Inc.
- CXPZ - CSX Transportation
- CXR - Colorado Pacific Railroad
- CXRG - Colorado Pacific Rio Grande Railroad
- CXRZ - CSX Transportation
- CXVZ - CSX Intermodal, Inc.
- CYCY - Crystal City Railroad
- CYDX - Conrad Yelvington Distributors, Inc.
- CYTX - Construcciones Y Trituaraciones, SA de CV
- CYX - American Cyanamid Company
- CZ - Coahuila and Zacatecas Railway
- CZCX - Crown Zellerbach Corporation
- CZRY - Carrizo Gorge Railway
