= Macquarie Infrastructure Corporation =

American infrastructure corporation

- Type: Private
- Industry: Aerospace; Bulk Liquid Storage; Hydronics; Oil and gas
- Founded: 2004
- Headquarters: 125 West 55th Street; New York, New York, United States
- Key people: Martin Stanley (Chairman) James Hooke (President & CEO) Liam Stewart (CFO)
- Revenue: ▲US$1.03 billion (FY 2012)
- Operating income: ▼US$29.5 million (FY 2012)
- Net income: ▼US$13.3 million (FY 2012)
- Total assets: ▲US$2.22 billion (FY 2012)
- Total equity: ▼US$655.0 million (FY 2012)
- Number of employees: +2,000
- Subsidiaries: Atlantic Aviation, IMTT, MIC Hawaii, CP&E
- Website: https://www.micinc.com

Macquarie Infrastructure Holdings, LLC., (MIH) formerly Macquarie Infrastructure Corporation (MIC), owned, operated and invested in a diversified group of infrastructure businesses. Macquarie Infrastructure Corporation's business consisted of the largest network of fixed-base operations in the United States, the largest bulk storage terminal business in the U.S., a gas production and distribution business, and a controlling interest in two district energy businesses. The company was headquartered in New York City. MIC was managed by Macquarie Infrastructure Management (USA) Inc. (MIMUSA), which was also one of MIC's largest shareholders. MIMUSA was a member of Sydney-based Macquarie Group Limited.

MIC's Atlantic Aviation division was sold to KKR & Co. in 2021 and the remainder of its assets and operations were bought by Argo Investments in a complex merger with Argo affiliate AMF Hawaii Holdings, LLC finalized in 2022. Its de-facto successor is Macquarie Infrastructure Partners, which through Macquarie Asset Management is another subsidiary of the Macquarie Group with similar holdings, but a distinct legal entity from both MIC and MIH, both of which cased to exist following the aforementioned mergers and acquisitions.

== History ==
The company took its name from Macquarie Bank, which took its name from Lachlan Macquarie, who was Governor of New South Wales. One of his achievements includes the establishment of Australia's first bank and introduction of its first domestic coinage in 1813, the Holey dollar. Macquarie's logo is a stylized version of Holey dollar coin.

On December 16, 2004 the company went public as Macquarie Infrastructure Company Trust: it sold 26 million shares at $25 a piece and collected $665 million.

On January 11, 2006, the AvPorts division was merged into the Atlantic division.

On January 1, 2007, Macquarie Infrastructure Company Trust was succeeded by Macquarie Infrastructure Company LLC.

On January 1, 2009, AvPorts was sold to Aviation Facilities Company, Inc. (AFCO).

On January 28, 2010, Macquarie Infrastructure Corporation announced that its airport parking business, Parking Corporation of America Airports (PCAA), had entered into an asset purchase agreement with Bainbridge ZKS - Corinthian Holdings, LLC. The company had earlier filed for Chapter 11 Bankruptcy.

On May 21, 2015, membership interests in Macquarie Infrastructure Company LLC were exchanged, one for one, for shares of Macquarie Infrastructure Corporation as a result of the conversion of the Company from a Delaware limited liability company to a Delaware corporation.

On July 21, 2022, Macquarie Infrastructure Holdings, LLC (“MIC”) announced that it completed its previously disclosed merger with an affiliate of Argo Infrastructure Partners, LP and the units of the Company were delisted from the New York Stock Exchange. MIC completed sales of its International-Matex Tank Terminals business in 2020 and its Atlantic Aviation business in 2021.

== Subsidiaries ==
- Atlantic Aviation
- MIC Hawaii (formerly Hawai'i Gas)
- CP&E

=== MIC Hawaii ===
MIC Hawaii (formerly Hawaii Gas) is a wholly owned subsidiary of Macquarie Infrastructure Corporation, founded in 1904. It is the sole franchised gas utility provider in the state of Hawaii. The company provides synthetic natural gas, and propane, and is working on providing Liquid Natural Gas (LNG) to 70,000 customers in Hawaii. The company recently underwent a rebranding, changing its name from The Gas Company to Hawai'i Gas, to reflect its position on changing Hawaii's energy future.

=== International-Matex Tank Terminals ===
International-Matex Tank Terminals (IMTT), founded in 1939 and based in New Orleans, Louisiana, is the owner of the largest bulk storage terminal businesses in the United States. It stores and handles petroleum products, vegetable and tropical oils, renewable fuels, and various chemicals. The company also provides support services, such as design, procurement, and construction management of retrofit and grassroots facilities in petrochemical and chemical storage facilities; inventory management; tank leasing; packaging; and heating, blending, and product services. In addition, IMTT offers intra-company rail service flexible blending and transfer, customer waterfront, economical heating, petroleum reserve, and drum filling services. Macquarie Infrastructure Group purchased 50 percent stake in 2006, and assumed full ownership in 2014.

Storage Terminal Locations

1. Richmond, CA
2. Joliet, IL
3. Lemont, IL
4. Avondale, LA
5. Geismar, LA
6. Gretna, LA
7. St. Rose, LA
8. Bayonne, NJ
9. Chesapeake, VA
10. Richmond, VA
11. Quebec, Canada
12. Placentia Bay, Newfoundland
