= List of railroads owned by Genesee & Wyoming =

The following is a list of railroads owned by Genesee & Wyoming. Genesee & Wyoming owns or leases 122 railroads across the United States, Canada, the United Kingdom and Europe.

== United States ==
Name	Mark	Class	Holding	Date	Trackage	Notes
Alabama and Gulf Coast Railway	AGR	II	Acquired (Note: Part of RailAmerica purchase.)	2012	339 mi (546 km)	
Aliquippa and Ohio River Railroad	AOR	III	Acquired	2008	9 mi (14 km)	
AN Railway	AN	III	Acquired	2005	119 mi (192 km)	Operates the original line of the Apalachicola Northern Railroad
Arizona and California Railroad	ARZC	III	Acquired	2012	204 mi (328 km)	
Arizona Eastern Railway	AZER	III	Acquired	2011	206 mi (332 km)	
Arkansas, Louisiana and Mississippi Railroad	ALM	III	Acquired	2003	117 mi (188 km)	
Arkansas Midland Railroad	AKMD	III	Acquired	2015	140 mi (230 km)	
Atlantic and Western Railway	ATW	III	Acquired	2005	19 mi (31 km)	
Bauxite and Northern Railway	BXN	III	Acquired	2012	7 mi (11 km)	
Bay Line Railroad	BAYL	III	Acquired	2005	182 mi (293 km)	
Berkshire and Eastern Railroad	BERX	III	Founded	2023	414 mi (666 km)	Operates Pan Am Southern jointly owned by Norfolk Southern Railway and CSX Corporation.
Buffalo and Pittsburgh Railroad	BPRR	II	Founded	1988	728 mi (1,172 km)	Operates Allegheny and Eastern Railroad, Pittsburg and Shawmut Railroad.
California Northern Railroad	CFNR	III	Acquired	2012	255 mi (410 km)	
Carolina Piedmont Railroad	CPDR	III	Acquired	2012	33 mi (53 km)	
Cascade and Columbia River Railroad	CSCD	III	Acquired	2012	145 mi (233 km)	
Central Oregon and Pacific Railroad	CORP	II	Acquired	2012	362 mi (583 km)	
Central Railroad of Indiana	CIND	III	Acquired	2012	92 mi (148 km)	
Central Railroad of Indianapolis	CERA	III	Acquired	2012	60 mi (97 km)	
CG Railway	CGR	III	Acquired	2017	—N/a	50/50 joint venture with SEACOR Holdings. Train ferry service between the Port of Mobile, Alabama, U.S. and Coatzacoalcos, Mexico, across the Gulf of Mexico
Chattahoochee Bay Railroad	CHAT	III	Acquired	2006	26 mi (42 km)	
Chattahoochee Industrial Railroad	CIRR	III	Founded	2003	15 mi (24 km)	
Chattooga and Chickamauga Railway	CCKY	III	Acquired	2008	49 mi (79 km)	
Chesapeake and Albemarle Railroad	CA	III	Acquired	2012	68 mi (109 km)	
Chicago, Fort Wayne and Eastern Railroad	CFE	III	Acquired	2012	281 mi (452 km)	
Columbus and Chattahoochee Railroad	CCH	III	Founded	2012	26 mi (42 km)	
Columbus and Greenville Railway	CAGY	III	Acquired	2008	151 mi (243 km)	
Columbus and Ohio River Railroad	CUOH	III	Acquired	2008	247 mi (398 km)	
Commonwealth Railway	CWRY	III	Acquired	1996	24 mi (39 km)	
Conecuh Valley Railroad	COEH	III	Acquired	2012	13 mi (21 km)	
Connecticut Southern Railroad	CSO	III	Acquired	2012	23 mi (37 km)	
Corpus Christi Terminal Railroad	CCPN	III	Founded	1997	42 mi (68 km)	
Dallas, Garland and Northeastern Railroad	DGNO	III	Acquired	2012	168 mi (270 km)	
East Tennessee Railway	ETRY	III	Acquired	2005	4 mi (6.4 km)	
Eastern Alabama Railway	EARY	III	Acquired	2012	26 mi (42 km)	
First Coast Railroad	FCRD	III	Founded	2005	32 mi (51 km)	
Fordyce and Princeton Railroad	FP	III	Acquired	2003	57 mi (92 km)	
Galveston Railroad	GVSR	III	Acquired	2005	39 mi (63 km)	
Georgia Central Railway	GC	III	Acquired	2005	171 mi (275 km)	
Georgia Southwestern Railroad	GSWR	III	Acquired	2008	231 mi (372 km)	
Golden Isles Terminal Railroad	GITM	III	Founded	1998	13 mi (21 km)	
Grand Rapids Eastern Railroad	GR	III	Acquired	2012	22 mi (35 km)	
Heart of Georgia Railroad	HOG	III	Acquired	2017	219 mi (352 km)	
Hilton and Albany Railroad	HAL	III	Founded	2011	56 mi (90 km)	
Huron and Eastern Railway	HESR	III	Acquired	2012^{a}	320 mi (510 km)	
Illinois and Midland Railroad	IMRR	III	Founded	1996	97 mi (156 km)	
Indiana and Ohio Railway	IORY	III	Acquired	2012	469 mi (755 km)	
Indiana Southern Railroad	ISRR	III	Acquired	2012	166 mi (267 km)	
Kentucky West Tennessee Railway	KWT	III	Acquired	2005	69 mi (111 km)	
Kiamichi Railroad	KRR	III	Acquired	2012	231 mi (372 km)	
Kyle Railroad	KYLE	III	Acquired	2012	505 mi (813 km)	
Little Rock and Western Railway	LRWN	III	Acquired	2005	79 mi (127 km)	
Louisiana and Delta Railroad	LDRR	III	Founded	1987	86 mi (138 km)	
Luxapalila Valley Railroad	LXVR	III	Acquired	2008	34 mi (55 km)	
Mahoning Valley Railway	MVRY	III	Acquired	2008	6 mi (9.7 km)	
Marquette Rail	MQT	III	Acquired	2012	126 mi (203 km)	
Maryland Midland Railway	MMID	III	Acquired	2007	70 mi (110 km)	
Massena Terminal Railroad	MSTR	III	Acquired	2012	3 mi (4.8 km)	
Meridian and Bigbee Railroad	MNBR	III	Acquired	2005	147 mi (237 km)	
Michigan Shore Railroad	MS	III	Acquired	2012	4 mi (6.4 km)	
Mid-Michigan Railroad	MMRR	III	Acquired	2012	87 mi (140 km)	
Missouri and Northern Arkansas Railroad	MNA	II	Acquired	2012	483 mi (777 km)	
New England Central Railroad	NECR	III	Acquired	2012	324 mi (521 km)	
North Carolina and Virginia Railroad	NCVA	III	Acquired	2012	53 mi (85 km)	
Ohio Central Railroad System	OHCR	III	Acquired	2008	70 mi (110 km)	
Ohio Southern Railroad	OSRR	III	Acquired	2008	18 mi (29 km)	
Olympia and Belmore Railroad	OYLO	III	Acquired	2016	12 mi (19 km)	
Otter Tail Valley Railroad	OTVR	III	Acquired	2012	54 mi (87 km)	
Pittsburgh and Ohio Central Railroad	POHC	III	Acquired	2008	35 mi (56 km)	
Point Comfort and Northern Railway	PCN	III	Acquired	2012	14 mi (23 km)	
Portland and Western Railroad	PNWR	II	Founded	1995	288 mi (463 km)	Operates Willamette and Pacific Railroad.
Prescott and Northwestern Railroad	PNW	III	Acquired	2015	6 mi (9.7 km)	
Providence and Worcester Railroad	PWRR	II	Acquired	2016	163 mi (262 km)	
Puget Sound and Pacific Railroad	PSAP	III	Acquired	2012	135 mi (217 km)	
Rapid City, Pierre and Eastern Railroad	RCPE	II	Founded	2014	743 mi (1,196 km)	Purchased for $210 million from Canadian Pacific Railway.[24]
Riceboro Southern Railway	RSOR	III	Acquired	2005	18 mi (29 km)	
Rochester and Southern Railroad	RSR	III	Founded	1986	58 mi (93 km)	Operates original Genesee and Wyoming Railroad and Dansville and Mount Morris Railroad.
Rockdale, Sandow and Southern Railroad	RSS	III	Acquired	2012	4 mi (6.4 km)	
St. Lawrence and Atlantic Railroad	SLR	III	Acquired	2002	143 mi (230 km)	Sister railroad to the Canada-based St-Laurent et Atlantique Railroad
San Diego and Imperial Valley Railroad	SDIY	III	Acquired	2012	1 mi (1.6 km)	
San Joaquin Valley Railroad	SJVR	III	Acquired	2012	297 mi (478 km)	
Savannah Port Terminal Railroad	SAPT	III	Founded	1998	18 mi (29 km)	
South Buffalo Railway	SB	III	Acquired	2001	54 mi (87 km)	
South Carolina Central Railroad	SCRF	III	Acquired	2012	47 mi (76 km)	
Tazewell and Peoria Railroad	TZPR	III	Founded	2004	24 mi (39 km)	Lessee of Peoria and Pekin Union Railway
Texas Northeastern Railroad	TNER	III	Acquired	2012	67 mi (108 km)	
Three Notch Railway	TNHR	III	Acquired	2012	34 mi (55 km)	Assets sold to Pinsly Railroad Company in 2025
Toledo, Peoria and Western Railway	TPW	III	Acquired	2012	207 mi (333 km)	
Tomahawk Railway	TR	III	Acquired	2005	6 mi (9.7 km)	
Utah Railway	UTAH	III	Acquired	2002	41 mi (66 km)	Operates Salt Lake City Southern Railroad.
Valdosta Railway	VR	III	Acquired	2005	10 mi (16 km)	
Ventura County Railroad	VCRR	III	Acquired	2012	9 mi (14 km)	
Warren and Saline River Railroad	WSR	III	Acquired	2015	5 mi (8.0 km)	
Warren and Trumbull Railroad	WTRM	III	Acquired	2008	4 mi (6.4 km)	
Wellsboro and Corning Railroad	WCOR	III	Acquired	2012	35 mi (56 km)	
Wilmington Terminal Railroad	WTRY	III	Acquired	2005	17 mi (27 km)	
Wiregrass Central Railroad	WGCR	III	Acquired	2012	20 mi (32 km)	
York Railway	YRC	III	Acquired	2002	42 mi (68 km)	
Youngstown and Austintown Railroad	YARR	III	Acquired	2008	5 mi (8.0 km)	
Youngstown Belt Railroad	YB	III	Acquired	2008	14 mi (23 km)	

== Canada ==
Name	Mark	Class	Holding	Date	Trackage	Notes
Cape Breton and Central Nova Scotia Railway	CBNS	III	Acquired	2012	245 mi (394 km)	
Goderich–Exeter Railway	GEXR	III	Acquired	2012	184 mi (296 km)	
Huron Central Railway	HCRY	III	Founded	1997	173 mi (278 km)	
Knob Lake and Timmins Railway	KLT	III	Founded	2015	13 mi (21 km)	
Ottawa Valley Railway	OVR	III	Acquired	2012	157 mi (253 km)	
Quebec Gatineau Railway	QGRY	III	Founded	1997	301 mi (484 km)	Lessee of Mirabel Railway
Red Deer Railway	RDRY	III	Founded	2024	43 mi (69 km)	
St-Laurent et Atlantique Railroad	SLQ	III	Acquired	2002	95 mi (153 km)	Sister railroad to the US-based St. Lawrence and Atlantic Railroad
Southern Ontario Railway	SOR	III	Acquired	2012	46 mi (74 km)	
Western Labrador Rail Services	WLRS	III	Founded	2010	19 mi (31 km)	

== Other ==
- Freightliner Group
- Rotterdam Rail Feeding ^{[Dutch]}
