= Philadelphia and Baltimore Central Railroad =

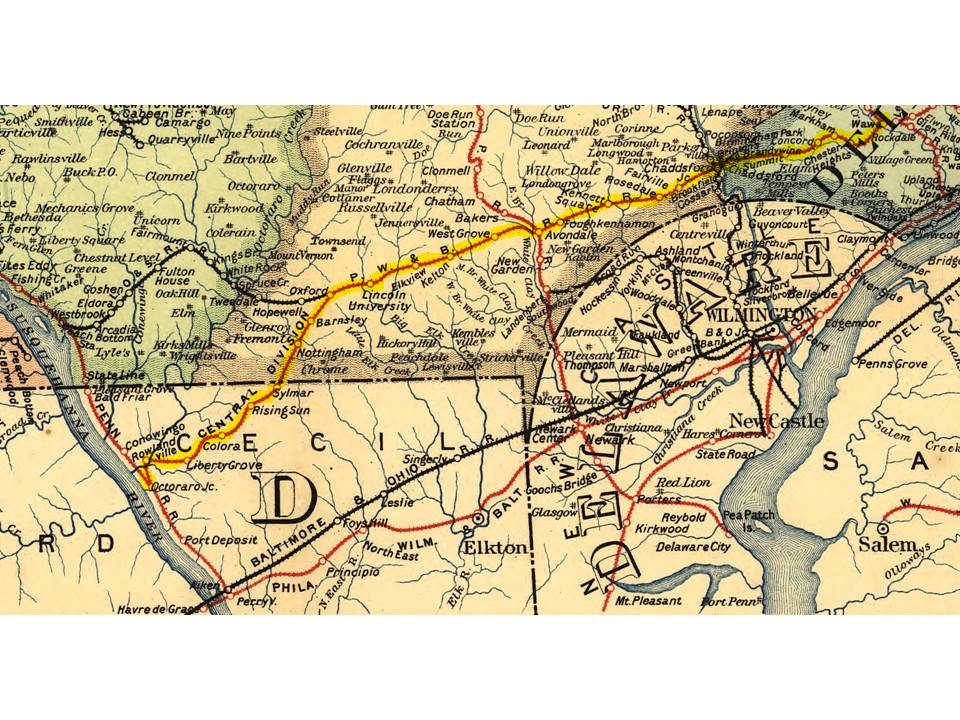
- 1895 map of the P&BC, labeled as "PW&B," reflecting its control by the Philadelphia, Wilmington and Baltimore Railroad

Overview
- Headquarters: Philadelphia
- Locale: Pennsylvania and Maryland
- Dates of operation: 1854–1916
- Successor: Philadelphia, Baltimore and Washington Railroad

Technical
- Track gauge: 4 ft 8 1/2 in (1,435 mm) standard gauge
- Length: 110 miles (180 km)

The Philadelphia and Baltimore Central Railroad (P&BC) was a railroad that operated in Pennsylvania and Maryland in the 19th and early 20th centuries. It operated a 110-mile (180 km) main line between West Philadelphia and Octoraro Junction, Maryland (near Port Deposit), plus several branch lines.

== History ==
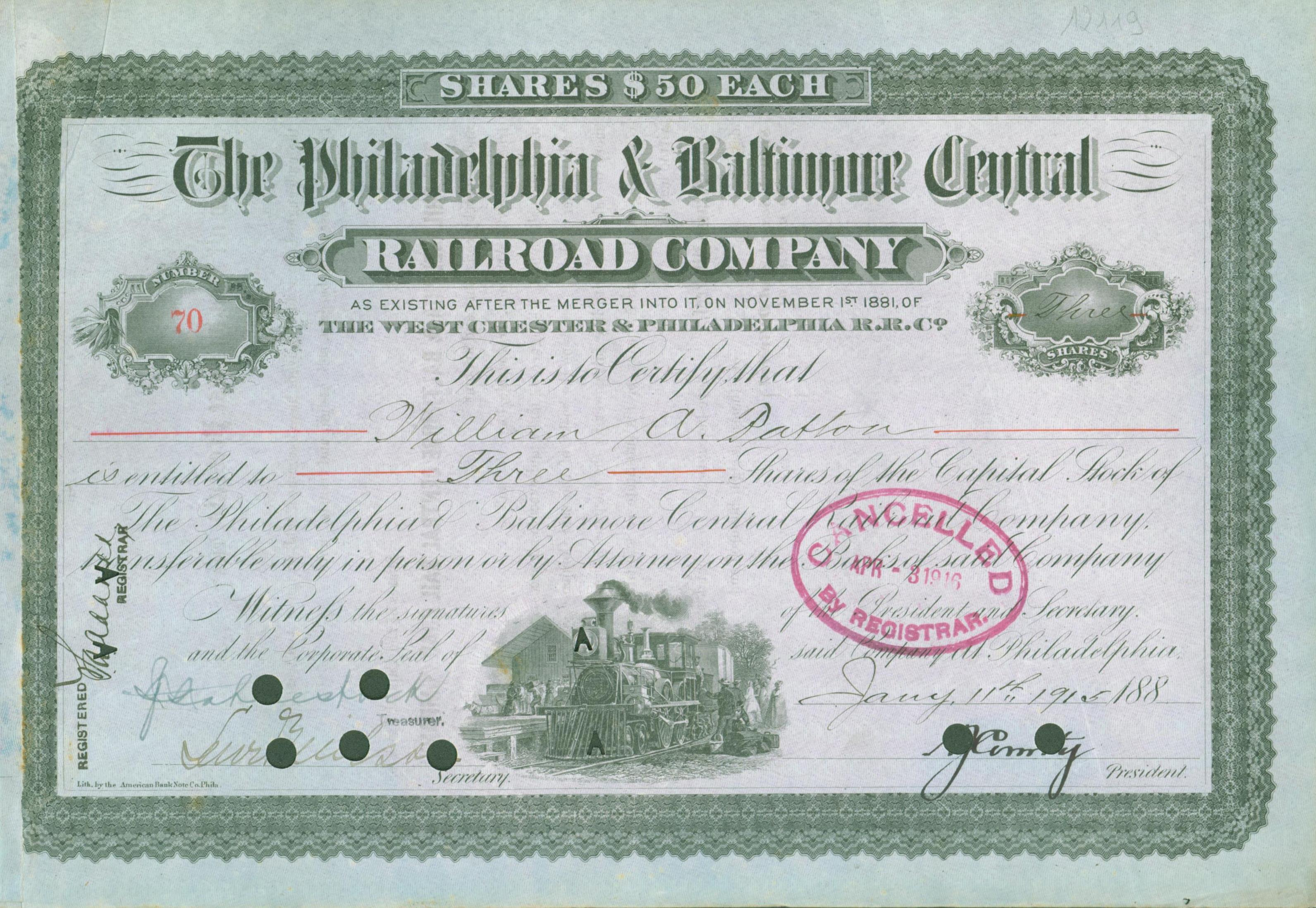
Share of the Philadelphia & Baltimore Central Railroad Company, issued 11 January 1915

The P&BC was chartered in Pennsylvania in 1854 and quickly absorbed the Baltimore & Philadelphia Railroad and its Maryland charter. Starting from a connection with the West Chester & Philadelphia Railroad (WC&P) at Wawa, Pennsylvania (formerly called Grubb's Bridge), the initial plan was to build southwest for 78 miles (126 km) to a junction with the Northern Central Railway, north of Baltimore. As built, however, the line would reach only from Wawa (where the WC&P line arrived from Philadelphia in 1856) to the northern bank of the Susquehanna River, in Cecil County, Maryland, near Port Deposit.

P&BC construction began in 1855 at Concordville, Pennsylvania. The first section of the line, between Wawa Junction and Chadds Ford, Pennsylvania, opened in 1859. Rails reached Oxford, Pennsylvania by the following year, and the first train arrived there on December 22, 1860.

P&BC reached Rising Sun, Maryland on Christmas morning, 1865. By December 1868, it reached 46 miles (74 km) and its southernmost point at Rowlandsville (4 miles (6.4 km) north of Port Deposit, along Octoraro Creek), where it connected with the Columbia & Port Deposit Railroad (C&PD). Instead of building its own bridge over the Susquehanna to continue service toward Baltimore, the P&BC simply leased the C&PD line for a few miles to Perryville, where trains could proceed south over the new bridge built by the Philadelphia, Wilmington & Baltimore Railroad (PW&B).

In 1881, P&BC absorbed the West Chester & Philadelphia Railroad — both lines were controlled by the PW&B, which was itself controlled by the Pennsylvania Railroad (PRR) — extending its main line to West Philadelphia.

In 1916, P&BC was formally purchased by PW&B's successor company, the Philadelphia, Baltimore & Washington. Subsequently, the line from Wawa south to Rowlandsville was called the Octoraro Branch. Passenger train service from Octoraro to Perryville over the C&PD line ended in 1935, and during or shortly after World War II, passenger service was cut back to Oxford before being ended entirely in April 1948.

== Decline ==
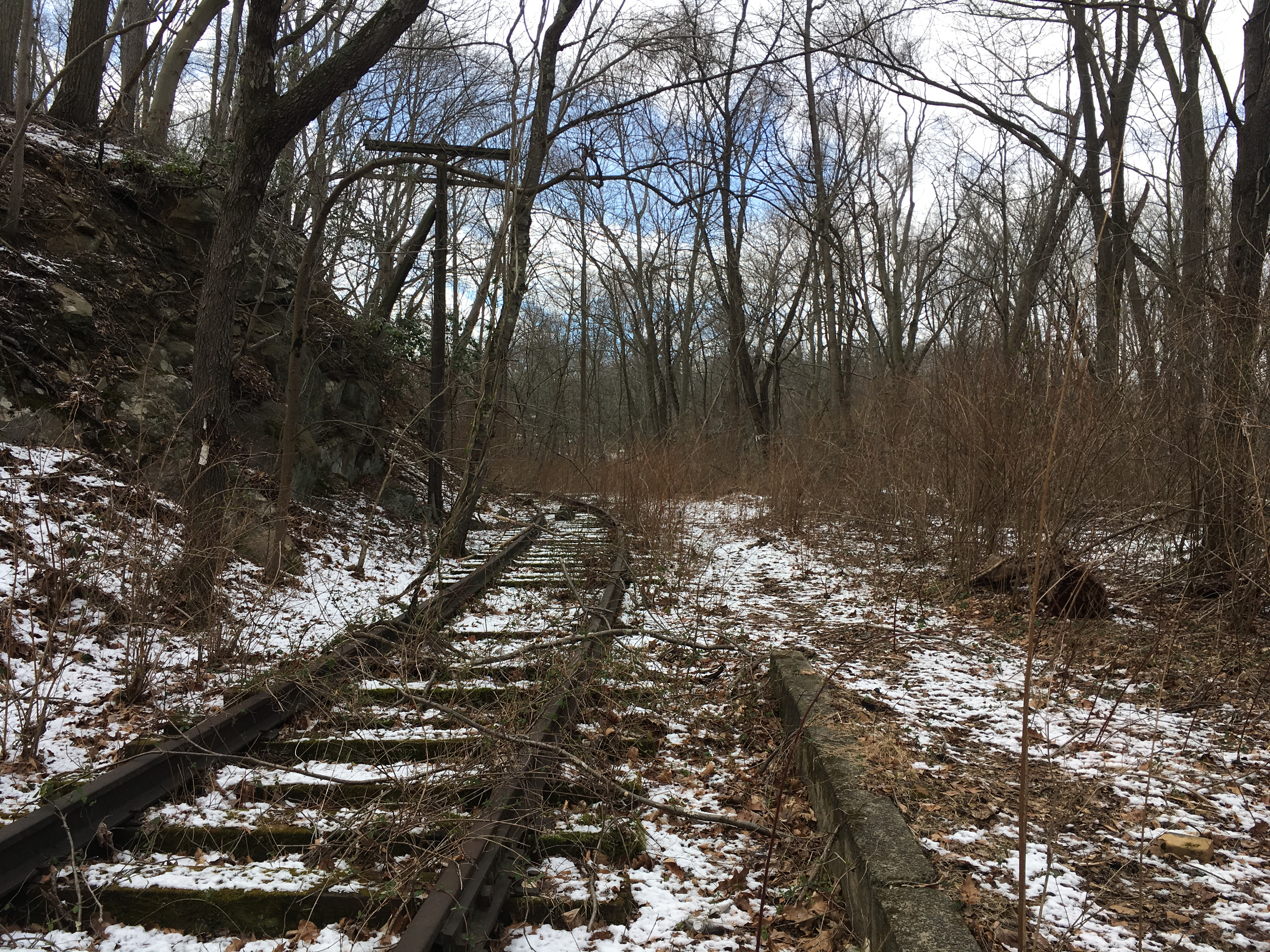
The abandoned Octoraro Branch at Wawa Station in 2017

In 1961, the PRR abandoned the Octoraro Branch south of Colora, Maryland. Tourist operator Wawa & Concordville Railroad leased the line between Concordville and Wawa in 1967 and 1968. The PRR merged with the New York Central Railroad in 1968 to form the Penn Central (PC), which was bankrupt by 1970. Hurricane Agnes caused several washouts in 1972 and rendered the line unusable north of Brandywine Creek.

Following the PC bankruptcy, ownership of the line went to Conrail, and then to the Southeastern Pennsylvania Transportation Authority (SEPTA), which leased the operable section to short-line freight railroad companies. The Octoraro Railway provided service between Oxford and Chadds Ford Junction from 1977 to 1994, while also operating the ex-Reading Wilmington & Northern branch through a connection at the latter place. In succession, the Delaware Valley Railway, the Brandywine Valley Railroad, and the Morristown & Erie Railway operated the line between 1994 and 2004. The East Penn Railroad bought the line from SEPTA in 2004, and currently operates between Nottingham, Pennsylvania and Chadds Ford Junction. SEPTA has retained ownership of the derelict Chadds Ford-Wawa section.

== See also ==
- List of defunct Maryland railroads
- List of defunct Pennsylvania railroads
- Wawa Station
