= EMD MP15DC =

Type of diesel-electric locomotive

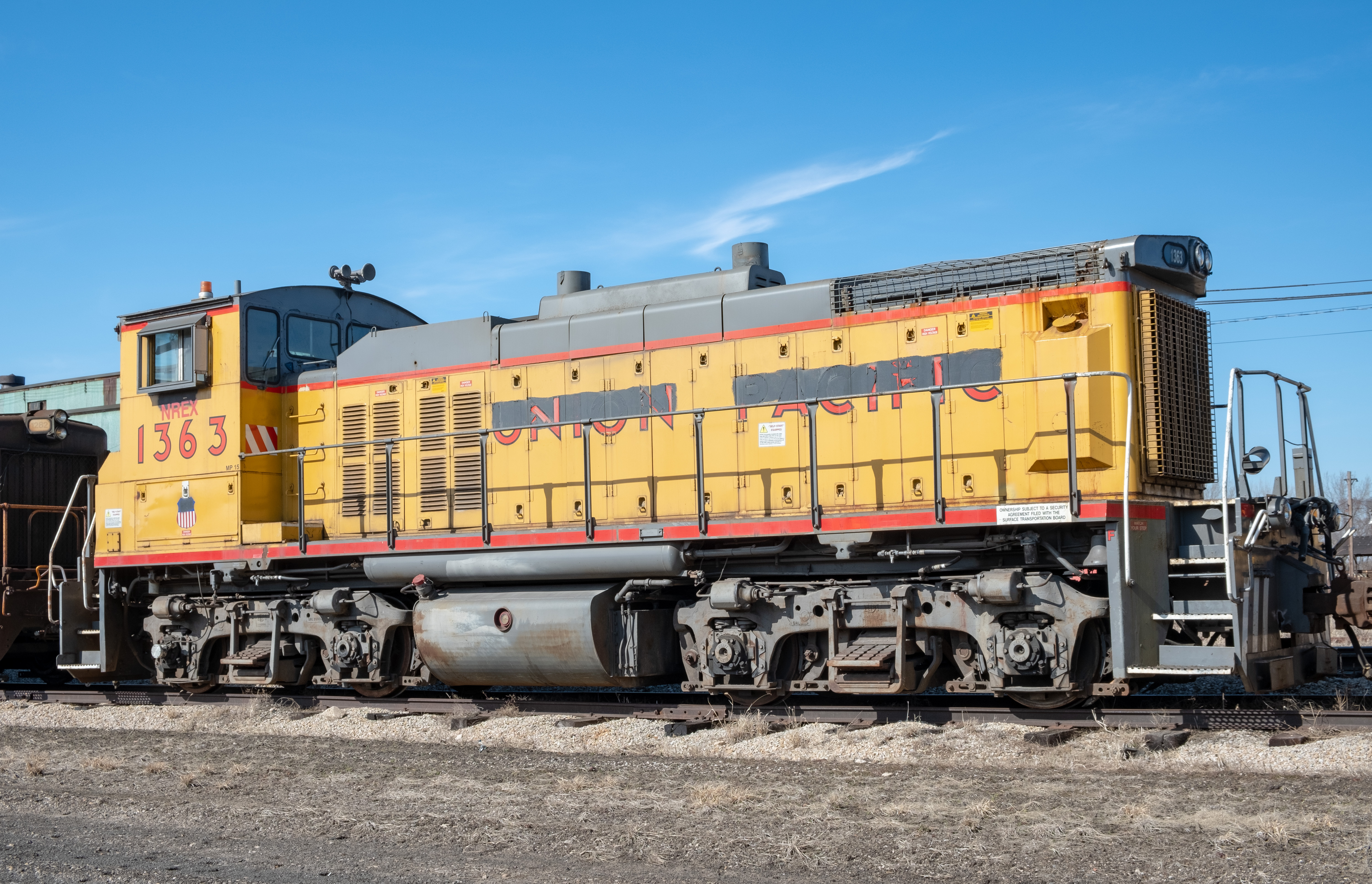
- NREX 363 (ex-MP 1363) in Silvis, Illinois (2020)
Type and origin
- Power type: Diesel-electric
- Builder: Electro-Motive Division (EMD)
- Model: MP15DC
- Build date: March 1974 – November 1980
- Total produced: 351
Specifications
- Configuration
  - AAR: B-B
- Gauge: 4 ft 8 1/2 in (1,435 mm) standard gauge
- Trucks: Blomberg B
- Wheel diameter: 40 in (1,016 mm)
- Minimum curve: 55° (107 ft (32.614 m)
- Wheelbase: 24 ft 2 in (7.366 m) between bolsters; 9 ft 0 in (2.743 m) between axles in each truck
- Length: 47 ft 8 in (14.53 m) or 48 ft 8 in (14.83 m) depending on build date
- Width: 10 ft 0 3/4 in (3.067 m)
- Height: 15 ft 0 in (4.57 m)
- Loco weight: 248,000 lb (112,493 kg)
- Fuel capacity: 1,100 or 1,400 US gal (4,200 or 5,300 L; 920 or 1,170 imp gal)
- Lubricant cap.: 197 or 284 US gal (746 or 1,075 L; 164 or 236 imp gal)
- Coolant cap.: 230 US gal (871 L; 192 imp gal)
- Sandbox cap.: 0.849 or 1.133 m^{3} (30.0 or 40.0 cu ft)
- Prime mover: EMD 12-645E
- RPM
  - RPM low idle: 235 RPM
  - RPM idle: 318±4 RPM (normal); 517±15 RPM (switching 2 mode)
  - Maximum RPM: 904±4 RPM
- Engine type: V12 diesel
- Aspiration: Mechanical using a Roots blower
- Displacement: 645 cu in (10.57 L) / cyl; 7,740 cu in (126.8 L)
- Generator: D32
- Traction motors: 4 × D77/78 DC
- Cylinders: 12
- Cylinder size: 9 1/16 in × 10 in (230 mm × 254 mm)
- Gear ratio: 62:15
Performance figures
- Maximum speed: 65 mph (104.6 km/h)
- Power output: 1,500 hp (1,119 kW)
- Tractive effort: 62,000 lbf (275.79 kN)

The EMD MP15, sometimes referenced as MP15DC, is a 1,500 hp (1,119 kW) diesel–electric road switcher locomotive model produced by General Motors' Electro-Motive Division between 1974 and 1980. It was equipped with a V12 12-645E engine sporting a Roots blower. The length was either 47 ft 8 in (14.53 m) or 48 ft 8 in (14.83 m) depending on the build date.

The early MP15 and the SW1500 were similar in appearance and applications. They were fitted with the same engine in a similar appearance. The primary difference is the MP15's standard Blomberg B trucks.

== Development ==
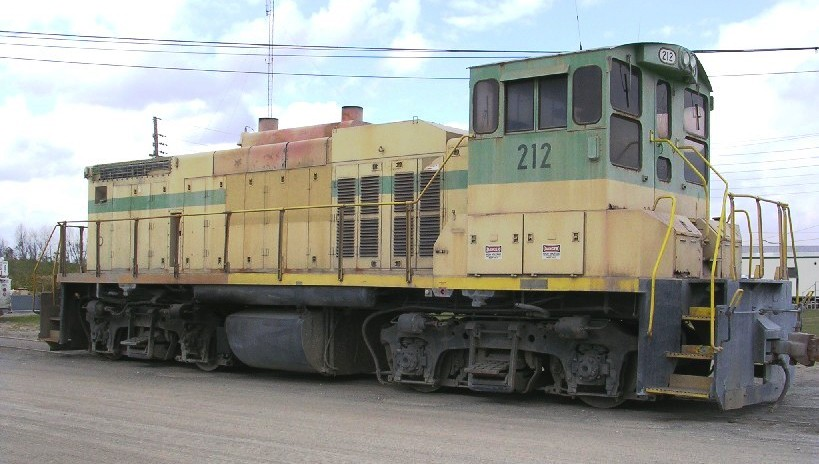
Mosaic 212, an EMD MP15DC Fort Meade, Florida

Switchers up to the SW1500 had been restricted to AAR type A switcher or Flexicoil lightweight trucks, both with a 96 in (2,438 mm) wheelbase. In 1973 60 special order Mexico-only SW1504s were built on a slightly longer frame, allowing EMD's standard Blomberg B trucks, with a 108 in (2,743 mm) wheelbase, to be used. In EMD's eyes (among others) this made the new locomotive a road switcher rather than a pure switcher, since it was capable of road speeds up to 60 mph (97 km/h) or so. The new model MP15DC designation thus meant Multi-Purpose locomotive, 1500 hp, DC generator. Originally the locomotive was simply designated the MP15; the arrival of the alternator/rectifier MP15AC in 1975 changed the name.

With the success of the MP15, there was a demand for a model with an advanced AC drive system. The MP15AC replaced the MP15DC's DC generator with an alternator producing AC power which is converted to DC for the traction motors with a silicon rectifier. The MP15AC is 1.5 ft (457 mm) longer than an MP15DC, the extra space being needed for the rectifier equipment. The alternator-rectifier combination was more reliable than a generator, and this equipment became the standard for new diesel-electric locomotive designs.

The MP15AC was easily distinguished from the DC models. Instead of the front-mounted radiator intake and belt-driven fan used on all previous EMD switchers, these had intakes on the lower forward nose sides and electric fans. Side intakes allowed the unit to take in cooler air, and the electric fans improved a serious reliability issue found in its earlier DC sisters.

== Engine ==
The MP15 used a 12-cylinder version of the 645E series engine developing 1,500 hp at 904±4 rpm. Introduced in the SW1500, this was a 2-stroke, 45-degree V type, with a 9 1/16-inch bore by 10-inch stroke, giving 645 cubic inches displacement per cylinder. The 645 series, introduced in 1966, was EMD's standard engine through the 1980s.

== Original buyers ==
Railroad	Quantity	Road numbers	Notes
Alcoa	1	7	
Alton and Southern Railway	1	1522	
Altos Hornos de México	5	146–148, 159, 166	
American Cyanamid	2	18, 19	
Arizona Public Service	1	2	
Bauxite and Northern Railway	2	15, 16	
BC Hydro	3	151–153	
Belt Railway of Chicago	4	533–536	
Birmingham Southern Railroad	2	260, 261	
Cambria and Indiana Railroad	2	19, 20	
Chicago and Northwestern	15	1302–1316	C&NW 1313 retired prior to UP merger. Remaining 14 units renumbered to UP 1315–1328 in 2000–2001.
Cities Service	1	109	
Conn. Davison Chemical Division	4	121, 122, 131, 132	
Genesee and Wyoming Railroad	2	45, 46	
Georgetown Railroad	2	1011, 1012	
Graysonia, Nashville & Ashdown Railroad	1	80	
Gulf Oil	1	101	
Houston Belt & Terminal Railroad	5	60–64	
Industrial Minera México	2	2, 10	
Kansas City Southern Railway	4	4363–4366	
Kelly's Creek and Northwestern Railroad	2	1, 2	
Lake Erie, Franklin and Clarion Railroad	4	25–28	
Louisville and Nashville Railroad	10	5030–5039	
Manufacturers Railway	3	251, 252, 254	
Metropolitan Sanitary District of Greater Chicago	1	4	
Missouri Pacific Railroad	62	1530–1554, 1356–1392	#1530 was the first MP15 built; renumbered by UP as 1330–1392 between 1986 and 1993.
North Louisiana and Gulf Railroad	4	42–45	
Pittsburgh and Lake Erie Railroad	25	1574–1598	15 units sold to Union Pacific in 1985 (1574-1583 and 1584, 1587, 1588, 1596 and 1598). Repainted and numbered 1300-1314 by UP in 1987.
Point Comfort and Northern Railway	5	11–15	
Quebec Iron and Titanium	2	9, 10	
Reading Company	10	2771–2780	Equipped with remanufactured and renewed ALCO RS-3 truck assemblies, including the General Electric 752 traction motors. To Conrail as #9621–9630
Rockdale, Sandow and Southern Railroad	3	13–15	
Southern Pacific Railroad	12	2690–2701	2691 and 2692 retired in 1994 and sold to Progress Rail, then OmniTRAX, and then Helm Financial, which leased them to Union Pacific as 1289 and 1290; these retired from UP in 2002 and sold to Caltrain in 2003 as 503 and 504. 2690 rebuilt by Union Pacific in 2005 and renumbered to 2005 as a GS14B Truck Engine Switcher, which was the first Genset locomotive. 2697 retired prior to merger with UP; remaining eight (2693-2696;2698-2701) renumbered consecutively as UP 1292-1299 after merger.
Southern Railway	88	2348–2435	
St. Louis–San Francisco Railway	5	361–365	To Burlington Northern Railroad as #4000–4004, later renumbered to #1000–1004
St. Mary's Railroad	2	504, 505	
Swift Chemical Company	1	1976	
Tennessee Eastman	1	2	
Terminal Railway Alabama State Docks	7	761, 771, 772, 801, 802, 821, 822	
Texas and Northern Railway	2	998, 999	
Texas City Terminal Railway	3	35–37	Split from the last Missouri Pacific order of MP15DCs. Painted and lettered for Missouri Pacific
Union Railroad	24	10–33	
U.S. Steel	15	170, 955–968	
Total	351		

== See also ==
- List of GM-EMD locomotives
- EMD MP15AC
