= RailAmerica =

Railroad holding company

RailAmerica, Inc.
- Type: Private
- Industry: Rail transport
- Founded: 1986
- Fate: Acquired by Genesee & Wyoming in 2012
- Successor: Genesee & Wyoming Inc.
- Headquarters: Jacksonville, Florida, United States
- Services: Short line and regional railroads
- Revenue: US$410.6 million (2009)

RailAmerica, Inc., based in Jacksonville, Florida, was a holding company of a number of short-line railroads and regional railroads in the United States and Canada.

In 2007, RailAmerica was acquired by Fortress Investment Group. Before that, it traded on the New York Stock Exchange with the ticker symbol RRA. It was relisted in October 2009 with the ticker symbol RA.

On June 30, 2010, the company announced that it had acquired Atlas Railroad Construction, a construction and maintenance company operating in the Northeast and Midwest United States, for US$24 million.

In April 2011, RailAmerica made its first shortline purchase in over five years by initiating a deal with Gulf and Ohio Railways to acquire three Alabama shortlines for $12.7 million.

On July 23, 2012, Genesee & Wyoming Inc. announced that it intended to purchase RailAmerica in a deal valued at $1.39 billion. Approval of the purchase was granted by the U.S. Surface Transportation Board on December 19, 2012. While awaiting the decision, Genesee & Wyoming put RailAmerica control in the hands of a trust. They assumed control on December 28, 2012, and the company was in the process of integration to G&W.

== Former subsidiaries ==
RailAmerica controlled the following railroads. It acquired some through purchase of other holding companies: RailLink Canada in July 1999, RailTex in February 2000, ParkSierra and StatesRail in January 2002, and the rail properties of Alcoa in September 2005.

In addition to those listed below, RailAmerica's prior owner, Fortress Investment Group, purchased the Florida East Coast Railway (FEC) in September 2007 from Florida East Coast Industries. Although Fortress maintained a level of common control between the two railroads, FEC was never made a formal part of the RailAmerica family, and Fortress did not include FEC in the RailAmerica spinoff.

RailAmerica was founded by Gary O. Marino and John H. Marino in 1986.

Company	Acquired from	Date	Notes
Alabama and Gulf Coast Railway	StatesRail	January 2002	
Arizona and California Railroad	ParkSierra	January 2002	
Bauxite and Northern Railway	Alcoa	September 2005	
California Northern Railroad	ParkSierra	January 2002	
Cape Breton and Central Nova Scotia Railway	RailTex	February 2000	
Carolina Piedmont Railroad	RailTex	February 2000	
Cascade and Columbia River Railroad	direct	September 1996	
Central Michigan Railway	direct	January 2004	Leased by Huron and Eastern Railway
Central Oregon and Pacific Railroad	RailTex	February 2000	
Central Railroad of Indiana	RailTex	February 2000	
Central Railroad of Indianapolis	RailTex	February 2000	Also operates Winamac Southern Railway as agent
Chesapeake and Albemarle Railroad	RailTex	February 2000	
Chicago, Fort Wayne and Eastern Railroad	direct	July 2004	
Connecticut Southern Railroad	RailTex	February 2000	
Dallas, Garland and Northeastern Railroad	RailTex	February 2000	
Eastern Alabama Railway	StatesRail	January 2002	
Goderich-Exeter Railway	RailTex	February 2000	
Grand Rapids Eastern Railroad	RailTex	February 2000	
Huron and Eastern Railway	direct	March 1992	
Indiana and Ohio Railway	RailTex	February 2000	
Indiana Southern Railroad	RailTex	February 2000	
Kiamichi Railroad	direct	January 2002	
Kyle Railroad	StatesRail	January 2002	
Lahaina, Kaanapali and Pacific Railroad	StatesRail	January 2002	
Marquette Rail	direct	February 2012	
Massena Terminal Railroad	Alcoa	September 2005	
Michigan Shore Railroad	RailTex	February 2000	
Mid-Michigan Railroad	RailTex	February 2000	
Missouri and Northern Arkansas Railroad	RailTex	February 2000	
New England Central Railroad	RailTex	February 2000	
North Carolina and Virginia Railroad	RailTex	February 2000	
Ottawa Valley Railway	RaiLink	July 1999	
Otter Tail Valley Railroad	direct	October 1996	
Point Comfort and Northern Railway	Alcoa	September 2005	
Puget Sound and Pacific Railroad	ParkSierra	January 2002	
Raillink Canada Limited	Direct	January 2002	Registered office in Montreal
Rockdale, Sandow and Southern Railroad	Alcoa	September 2005	
San Diego and Imperial Valley Railroad	RailTex	February 2000	
San Joaquin Valley Railroad	StatesRail	January 2002	
South Carolina Central Railroad	RailTex	February 2000	
Southern Ontario Railway	RaiLink	July 1999	
Texas Northeastern Railroad	RailTex	February 2000	
Toledo, Peoria and Western Railway	direct	September 1999	
Ventura County Railroad	direct	August 1998	
Virginia Southern Railroad	RailTex	February 2000	
A&R Line, Inc.	TP&W	September 1999	Leased by TP&W since 1997; owned by Cargill; service ended in September 2002
Arizona Eastern Railway	StatesRail	January 2002	Sold December 2004 to Permian Basin Railways
Central Western Railway	RaiLink	July 1999	Sold January 2006
Dakota Rail, Inc.	direct	September 1995	Sold December 2001 to Hennepin County Regional Railroad Authority
Delaware Valley Railway	direct	July 1994	Lease transferred March 1999 to Brandywine Valley Railroad
E&N Railway	direct	January 1999	Sold June 2006 to Southern Railway of British Columbia
Evansville Terminal Company	direct	June 1996	Sold September 1997 to John H. Marino
Ferronor	direct	February 1997	Leased Potrerillos Railway in January 2002; sold February 2004
Freight Australia	direct	April 1999	Sold August 2004 to Pacific National
Georgia Southwestern Railroad	RailTex	February 2000	Sold March 2002 to local interests
Gettysburg Railway	direct	November 1996	Sold October 1997 to John H. Marino; included Gettysburg Scenic Rail Tours
Indiana and Ohio Central Railroad	RailTex	February 2000	Merged May 2005 into Indiana and Ohio Railway
J.K. Line, Inc.	TP&W	September 1999	Leased by TP&W since 1998; owned by Cargill; service ended in April 2002
Lakeland and Waterways Railway	RaiLink	July 1999	Sold January 2006
Mackenzie Northern Railway	RaiLink	July 1999	Sold January 2006
Minnesota Northern Railroad	direct	December 1996	Sold August 2000 to KBN, Inc.
Ontario L'Orignal Railway	RailTex	February 2000	Sold December 2000
Pittsburgh Industrial Railroad	RailTex	February 2000	Sold December 2000 to Summit View, Inc.
Plainview Terminal Company	direct	November 1995	
St. Croix Valley Railroad	direct	September 1997	Sold August 2000 to KBN, Inc.
Saginaw Valley Railway	direct	March 1992	Merged September 2004 into Huron and Eastern Railway
San Luis and Rio Grande Railroad	direct	June 2003	Sold December 2005 to Permian Basin Railways
San Pedro and Southwestern Railway	StatesRail	January 2002	Sold October 2003 to Arizona Railroad Group
South Central Tennessee Railroad	direct	February 1994	Sold December 2000 to Henry G. Hohorst et al.
Texas-New Mexico Railroad	RailTex	February 2000	Sold May 2002 to Permian Basin Railways
West Texas and Lubbock Railroad	direct	November 1995	Leased May 2002 to Permian Basin Railways subsidiary West Texas and Lubbock Railway; sold December 2004 to Permian Basin Railways
