= Octoraro Railway =

Overview
- Headquarters: Kennett Square, Pennsylvania
- Reporting mark: OCTR
- Locale: Chester County, Pennsylvania and New Castle County, Delaware
- Dates of operation: 1977–1994
- Predecessor: Conrail
- Successor: Delaware Valley Railroad

Technical
- Track gauge: 4 ft 8 1/2 in (1,435 mm) standard gauge

The Octoraro Railway was an American shortline railroad that operated in Pennsylvania and Delaware from 1977 to 1994.

== History ==
This company was formed in 1976. It obtained a lease from SEPTA to operate freight trains on the Octoraro Branch, a former Pennsylvania Railroad branch line, between Chadds Ford, Pennsylvania and the state line near Sylmar, Maryland. It also leased the Wilmington and Northern Railroad, a former Reading Company branch, from Elsmere Jct. (Wilmington, Delaware) to South Modena (Modena, Pennsylvania).

The company then created a connection between the two lines at Chadds Ford.

The Octoraro Railway ceased operations on June 30, 1994. The Delaware Valley Railway acquired the company on July 1, 1994.

== Successor operations ==
Delaware Valley, a subsidiary of RailAmerica, operated the line until 1999, followed by the Brandywine Valley Railroad (BVRY). The Morristown and Erie Railway provided freight service from July 1, 2003, to November 18, 2004, but operated under the trade name of Octoraro Railroad. East Penn Railway took over operation in 2004 and purchased the right of way from SEPTA. In 2007 the company merged to become East Penn Railroad and operates the Octoraro line.

== See also ==
- List of Pennsylvania railroads
