= Coopersville and Marne Railway =

Tourist railroad in Coopersville, Michigan, U.S.

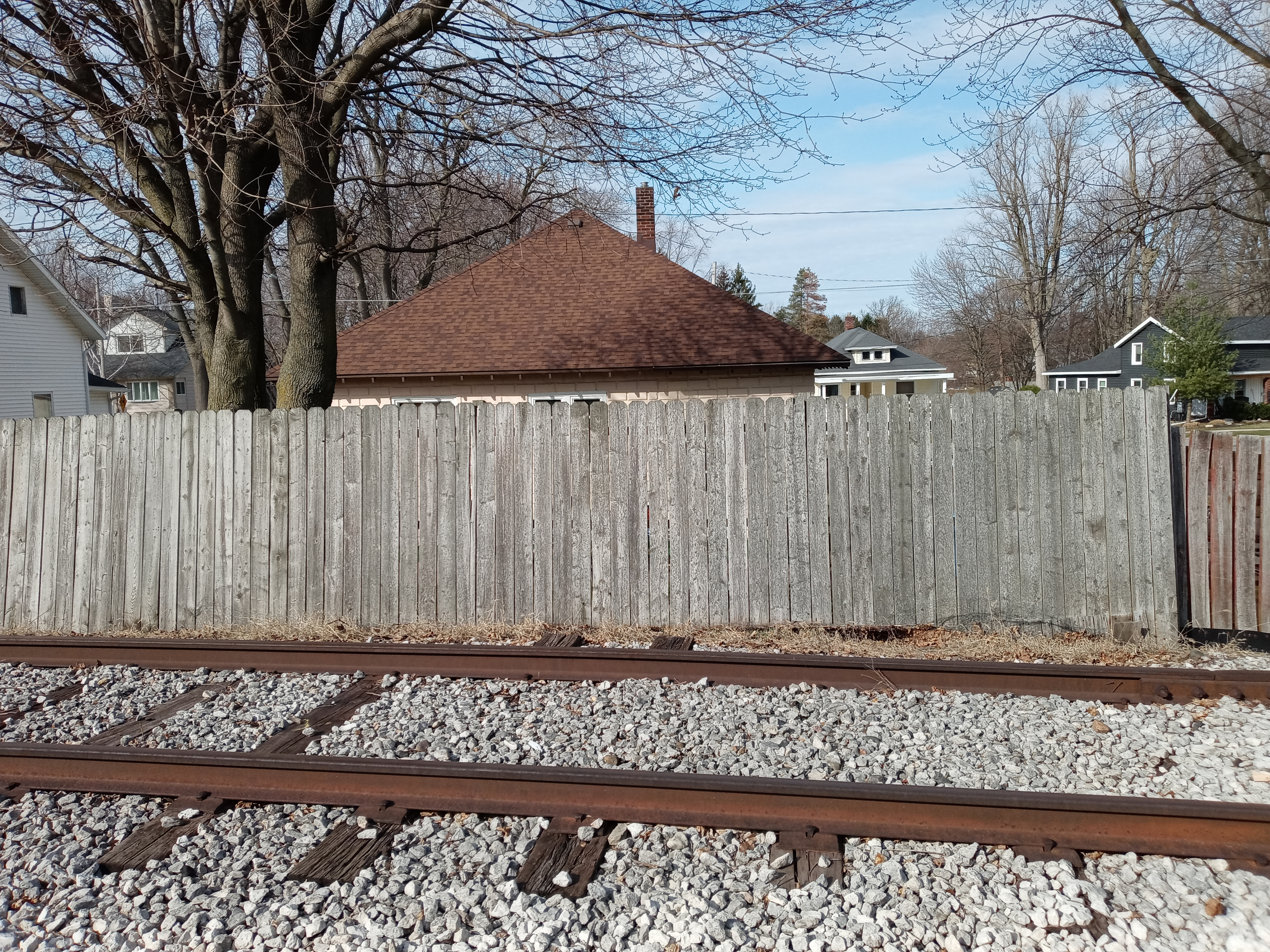

Overview
- Headquarters: Coopersville, Michigan
- Reporting mark: CPMY
- Locale: West Michigan
- Dates of operation: 1989–present
- Predecessor: Central Michigan Railway

Technical
- Track gauge: 4 ft 8 1/2 in (1,435 mm) standard gauge
- Length: 14.28 miles (22.98 km)

Other
- Website: mitrain.net

The Coopersville and Marne Railway is a non-profit tourist railroad and common carrier in West Michigan. It connects with the Grand Rapids Eastern Railroad in Grand Rapids. The company owns the track, which runs from Walker, Michigan to Coopersville, Michigan in Kent and Ottawa counties, approx 14 miles. It runs passenger excursion trains from Coopersville to Marne and back. Some are theme oriented while others are just train rides. They also service one freight customer, near the eastern end of the line, with cars of lumber.

As of 2008, one car in their fleet was selected to be handicapped accessible in the near future.

As of 2022, the handicap-accessible car was still under restoration. No completion date had been announced.

As of 2023, the handicap-accessible car had completed restoration and is operational.

The heritage of the line can be traced back to the 1850s, as the Oakland and Ottawa Railway. It later became part of the Detroit and Milwaukee Railroad, being the mainline to Grand Haven where they operated lake ferries to transport cars across Lake Michigan. Ultimately becoming part of the Grand Trunk Railroad, it became a branch line after the Trunk moved its ferry operations to Muskegon, via a shared trackage route with the Pennsylvania Railroad from Walker to Muskegon, thru Conklin and Ravenna. The Coopersville to Grand Haven route became a lighter use branch line for the remainder of the GT ownership, eventually being cut back to Coopersville before being sold to the Central Michigan in 1983. The Central Michigan also purchased the Muskegon route, eventually abandoning and removing the rail to be sold or used elsewhere. This fate was spared for the Coopersville segment, however, as a General Motors owned facility in Coopersville had a strategic supply contract in place with the US military at the time, requiring rail access in case of wartime needs. The tracks had already began to be removed on the west end of Coopersville city limits, when this was discovered. The tracks were placed back into operation and the line was put up for sale, as the Central Michigan did not have interest in owning the line for lack of customers.

== Locomotives ==
Locomotive details
Number	Original Owner	Type	Built	Builder	Notes
20	United States Army	20-ton Switcher	Unknown	Whitcomb Locomotive Works	Non-Operational, stored.
1395	Canadian National Railway	4-6-0	1913	Montreal Locomotive Works	Non-Operational, cosmetically restored and on display.
2394	Vermont Railway	RS-1	1942	American Locomotive Company	Non-Operational, poor candidate for restoration. Former Tuscola and Saginaw Bay Railway.
3049	DuPont Chemical	50-ton Switcher	157	General Electric	Operational, secondary locomotive used on the railroad.
5208	Chesapeake and Ohio Railway	NW2	1949	Electro-Motive Diesel	Non-Operational, used as a parts engine for #7014.
7014	Grand Trunk Western Railroad	SW9	1952	Electro-Motive Diesel	Privately owned. Operational, main locomotive used on the railroad.
7209	Consumers Energy	125-ton Center Cab Switcher	1949	General Electric	Gifted to CPMY in February, 2023, as part of the J.H. Campbell generation facility's planned 2025 closure. Was used as a switcher for coal gondolas at the facility. Source

== See also ==
- Employer determination
