= Octoraro =

Octoraro may refer to:

- Octoraro Creek, a tributary of the Susquehanna River in Pennsylvania
- Octoraro Railway, a shortline railroad that operated in Pennsylvania between 1977 and 1994
