= CCTR =

CCTR may refer to:

- Corpus Christi Terminal Railroad
- Camino Colombia Toll Road
