= Central Michigan Railway =

Former railroad in Michigan, United States

Overview
- Headquarters: Bay City, Michigan
- Reporting mark: CMGN
- Locale: Central Michigan
- Dates of operation: 1987–2004
- Predecessor: Grand Trunk Western
- Successor: Huron and Eastern Railway

Technical
- Track gauge: 1,435 mm (4 ft 8 1/2 in)

The Central Michigan Railway (CMGN) was a railroad that operated former Grand Trunk Western Railroad (GTW) north of Durand, Michigan, and other lines in the area.

== History ==
The Central Michigan Railway was formed in 1987 when the Straits Corporation bought GTW lines north of Durand. The line from Coopersville to Marne would be sold to the Coopersville & Marne Railroad in 1989, and in 1990 the Muskegon route was sold to the Michigan Shore Railroad. In 2004, Central Michigan Railway was bought by RailAmerica, which had merged it into the Huron and Eastern Railway.
