= Lake Erie, Franklin and Clarion Railroad =

Lake Erie, Franklin & Clarion Railroad
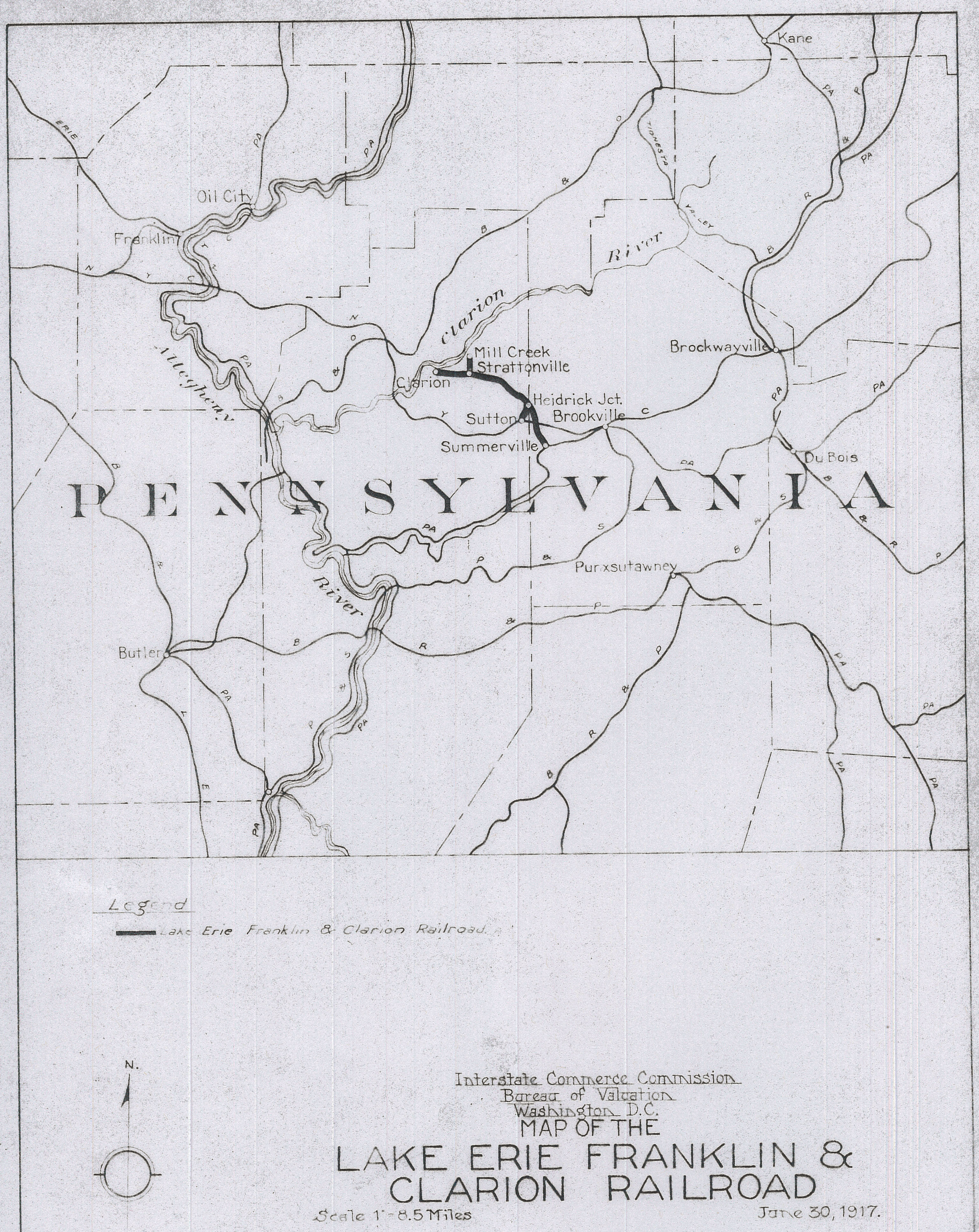
- 1917 map of the railroad

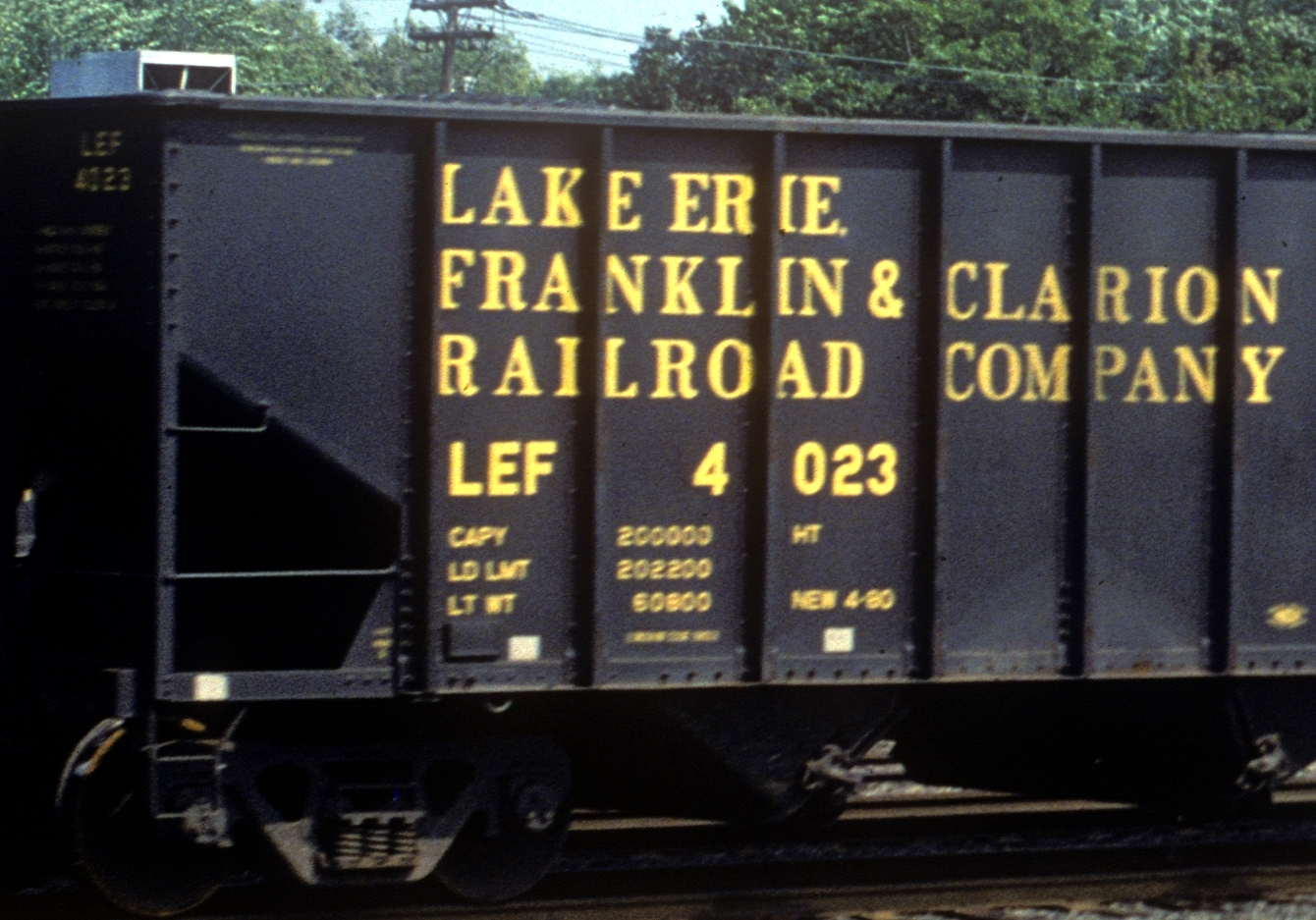
- LEF&CRRCo 100 Ton Hopper Car LEF 4023 was built in April 1980.

Overview
- Headquarters: Clarion, Pennsylvania
- Reporting mark: LEF
- Locale: Western Pennsylvania
- Dates of operation: 1913–1993

Technical
- Track gauge: 4 ft 8 1/2 in (1,435 mm) standard gauge
- Length: 15 miles (24 km)

The Lake Erie, Franklin, and Clarion Railroad (reporting mark LEF) was a fifteen mile long short line that ran from a Conrail connection at Summerville, Pennsylvania, to Clarion, Pennsylvania, the county seat of Clarion County, and included a short branch from Sutton to Heidrick. The road was incorporated in 1913 as a consolidation of several other railroads, the Pennsylvania Northern, Pennsylvania Southern, and the Pittsburgh, Clarion and Franklin, which itself was formed from the Pittsburgh, Summerville, and Clarion [which began operation in 1904 and was leased to the Pennsylvania Southern in 1910. Length peaked at about 80 miles of track in around 1924. The corporate name was somewhat optimistic: the railroad never reached either Franklin or Lake Erie.

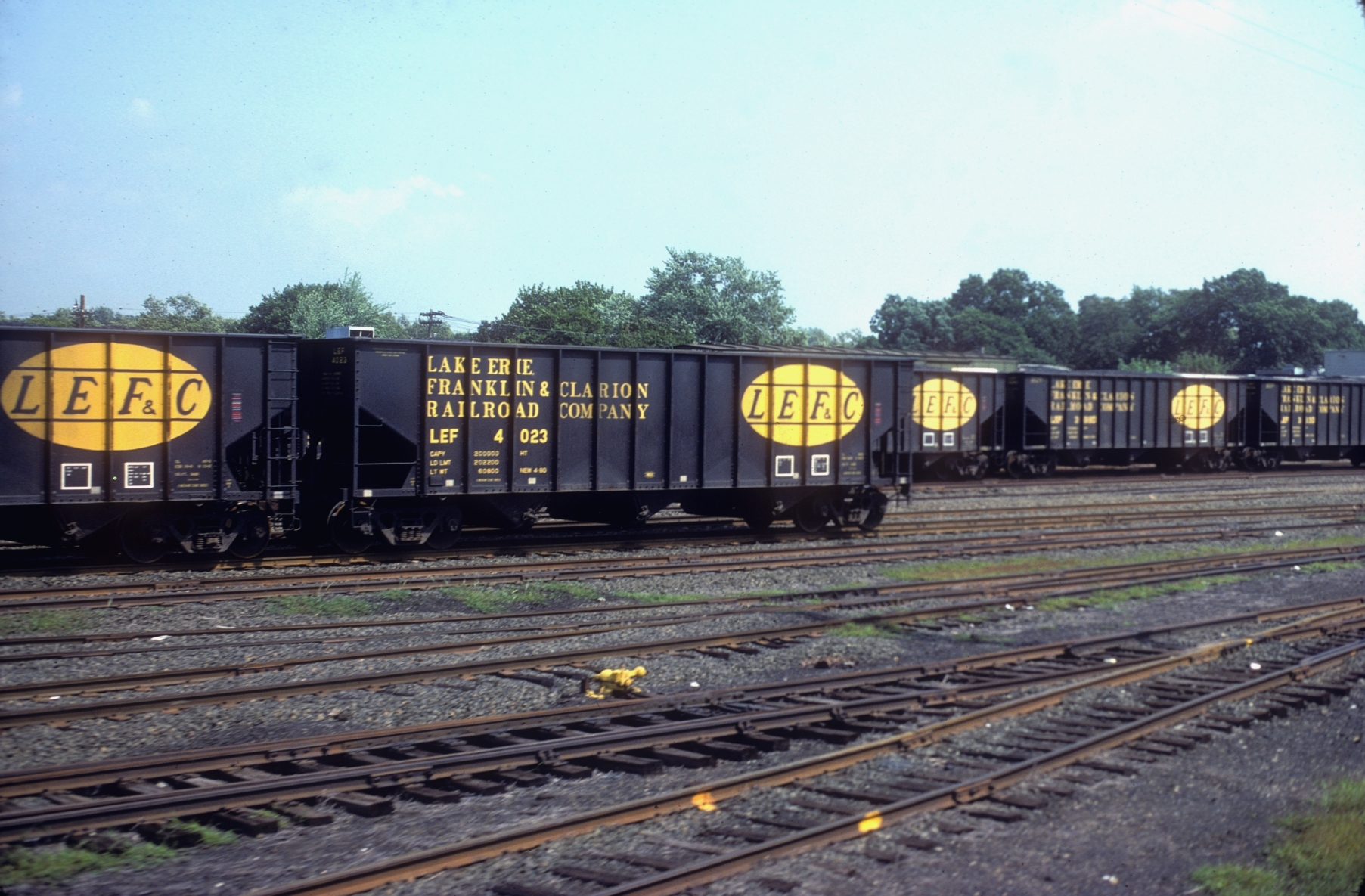
Lake Erie, Franklin and Clarion Railroad Company One Hundred Ton hopper Cars containing Unit Coal for Kings Park State Hospital New York.

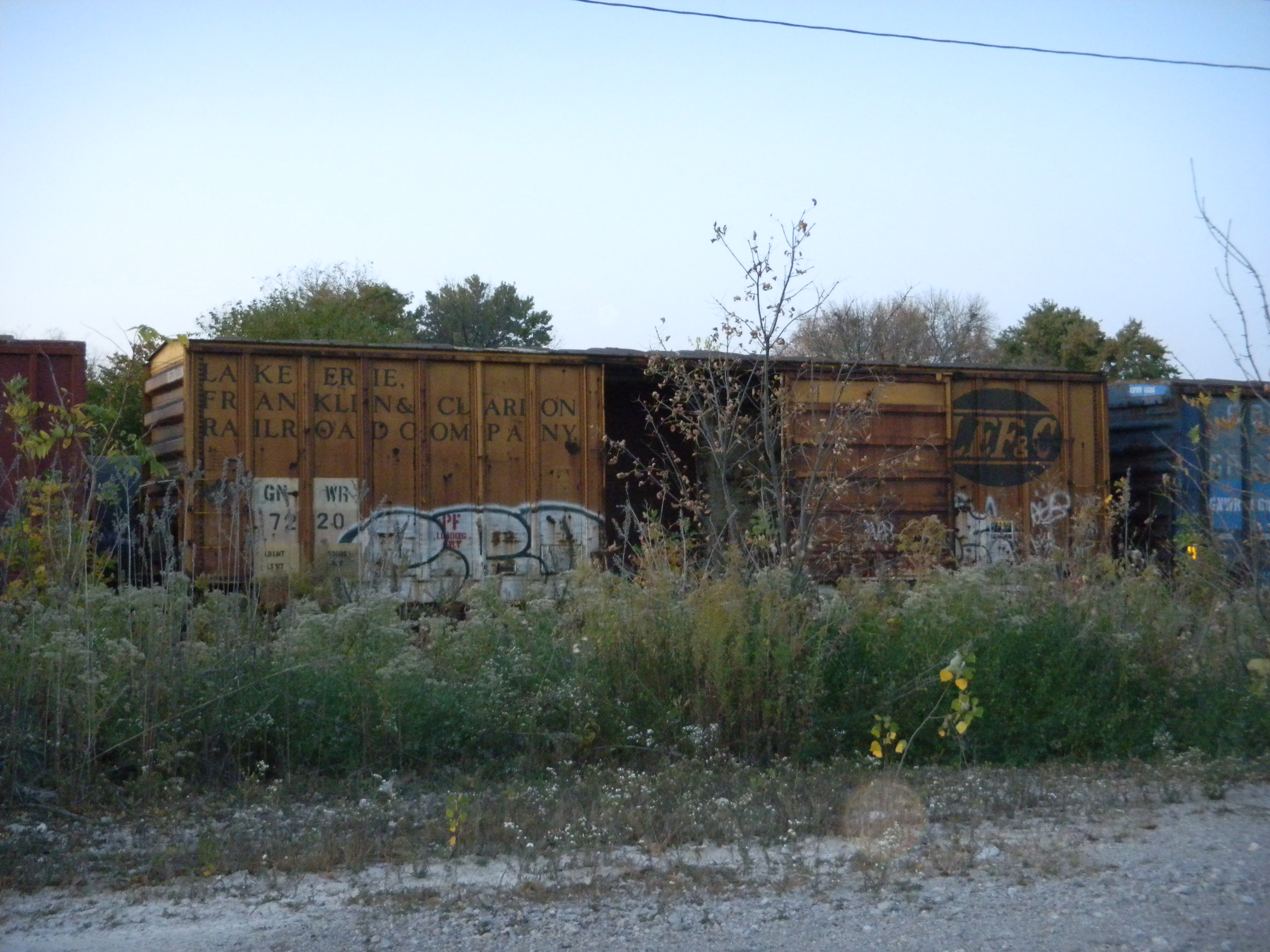
LEF boxcar on the CRANDIC at Cedar Rapids, Iowa

The line's yard and engine facility were located in Clarion, just south of U.S. route 322 and behind many of the buildings of Clarion University of Pennsylvania, formerly Clarion State Teachers' College. A section house was located at the siding to Hanley Brick, now Glen-Gary in Summerville. Motive power in the line's final years was four EMD MP15DC switchers #25-28, which replaced two earlier EMD SW1500s #23-24. During the final years when steam locomotives powered LEF&C trains, most of the road's locomotives were 2-8-0's which had been acquired second hand from other railroads.

In the late 20th century, traffic included sand for Clarion's glass making plant, glass bottles, lumber, and outbound shipments of coal, some of it in unit trains from the extensive coal deposits around Clarion. Traffic also included brick from the Hanley Brick Plant in Summerville.

== Abandonment ==
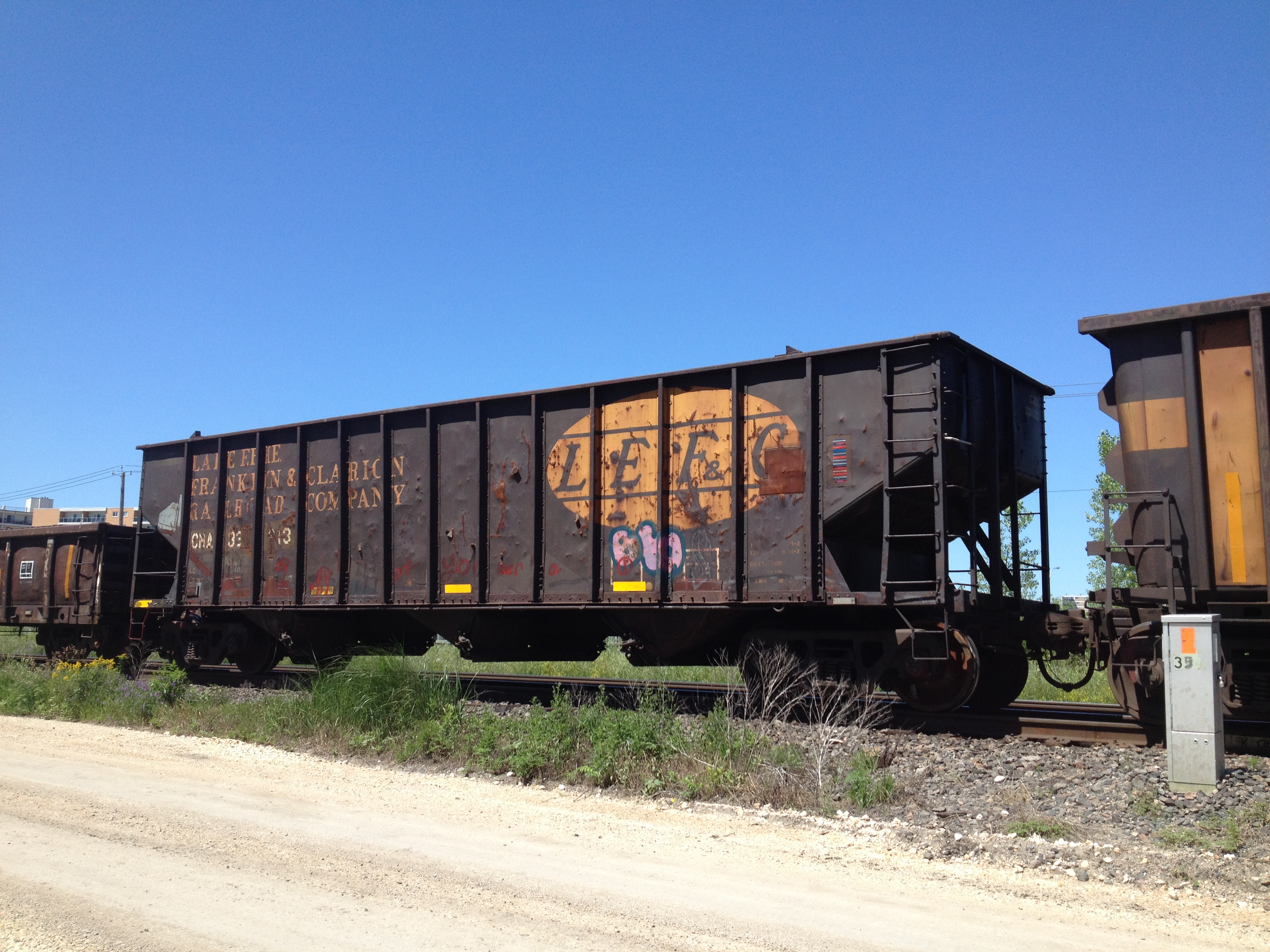
A Lake Erie, Franklin & Clarion hopper, now owned by CN.

The line ceased operation in the last decade of the 20th century due to a sharp decline in area coal mining. From the United States Government Publishing Office (GPO):

The Interstate Commerce Commission (ICC) granted LEF&C's petition for exemption to abandon its operations on September 17, 1992. Effective October 20, 1992, the ICC extended the time for the Mountain Laurel Railroad Company (MNL) to file an offer of financial assistance (OFA) to November 2, 1992, thereby postponing the effective date of the abandonment exemption to November 12, 1992. MNL did not file an OFA, thus freezing the abandonment date at November 12, 1992. According to Terry R. Zuckerman, President of the LEF&C, in his letters dated January 25, 1993 and June 22, 1993, only one or two employees worked in 1993. Mr. Zuckerman also advised that the last day worked by employees of LEF&C was January 5, 1993, and the operation of track has been abandoned.

The track was taken up and the roadbed is now a hiking path. One of the railroad's cabooses had been used for several years as a Chamber of Commerce roadside information booth across the highway from the local Wal-Mart, but has been removed and is now serving much the same purpose in the town of Foxburg on the Allegheny River, a few miles to the southwest.

== Preservation ==
LEF 20, an ALCO RS-1 diesel-electric locomotive built for the LEF&C in 1949, was sold to the Livonia, Avon and Lakeville Railroad in 1972. The LA&L adopted the LEF&C's paint scheme, and then in 2016 donated 20 to the Rochester & Genesee Valley Railroad Museum in Rush, New York, where the locomotive remains in operation for excursions under the LA&L name.

== See also ==
- List of defunct Pennsylvania railroads
