= Bauxite and Northern Railway =

Railroad in the United States

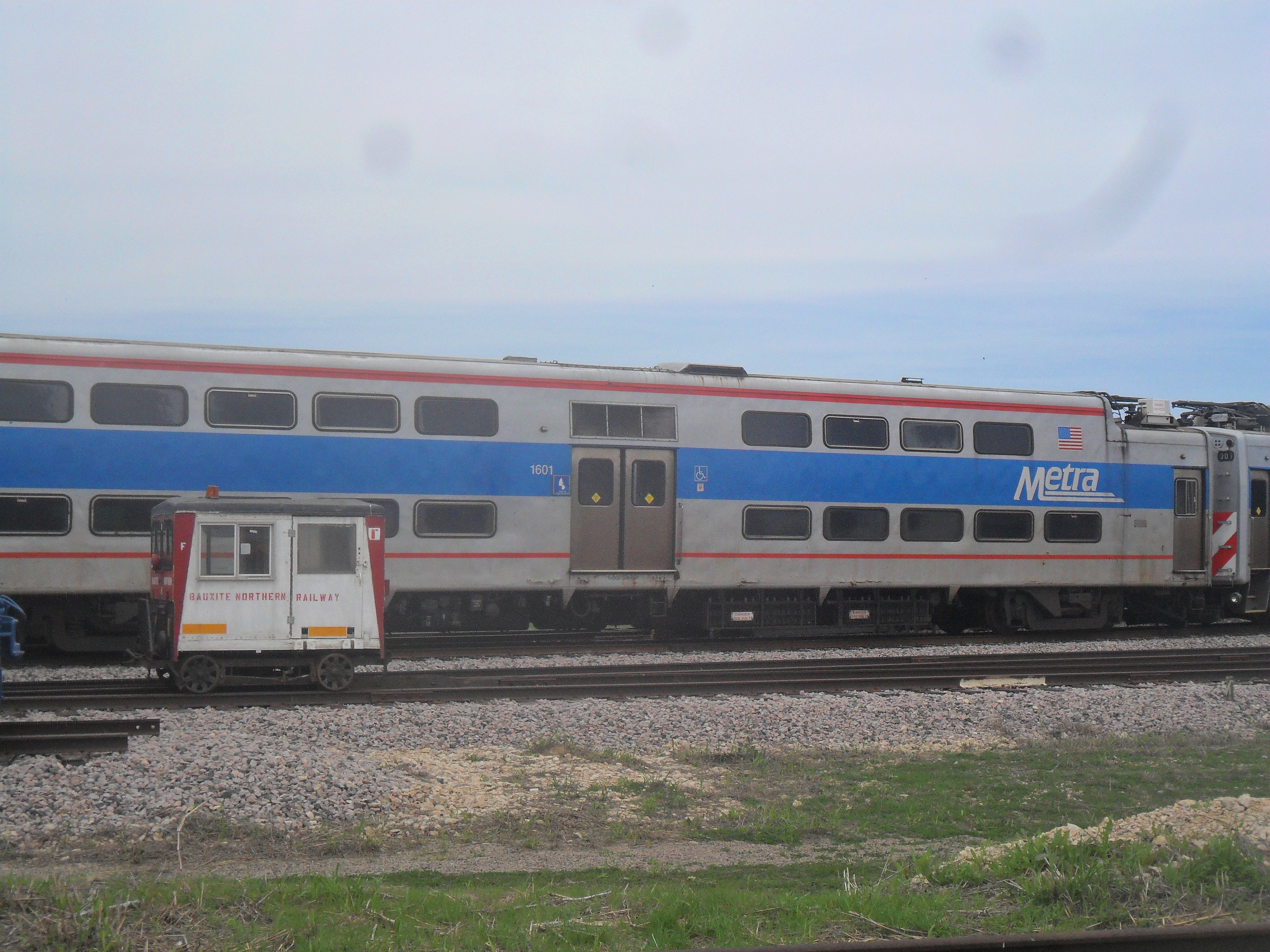
- A speeder from the Bauxite and Northern is on display at the Museum of the American Railroad in Frisco, Texas.

Overview
- Reporting mark: BXN
- Locale: Bauxite, Arkansas
- Dates of operation: 1906–present

Technical
- Track gauge: 4 ft 8 1/2 in (1,435 mm) standard gauge
- Length: 3 miles (4.8 km)

Other
- Website: Official site

The Bauxite & Northern Railway (reporting mark BXN) is a Class III railroad operating in the United States state of Arkansas. BXN operates over 3 miles (4.8 km) of track in Bauxite, Arkansas. Traffic consists of largely of alumina, and the railroad hauls 4,059 carloads per year. In 2005, the railroad was purchased by holding company RailAmerica. In December 2012, Genesee & Wyoming acquired the railroad in its acquisition of RailAmerica. As of 2023, Bauxite & Northern Railway interchanges with Union Pacific in Bauxite, Arkansas and can hold up to 286,000 pounds of supplies.

== History ==
The Bauxite and Northern Railway was incorporated in Arkansas on November 13, 1906 and began operations in 1907, for the purpose of constructing and operating a railroad from the town of Bauxite Saline County to a junction with the St. Louis, Iron Mountain and Southern Railway. The BXN connected with the Rock Island at Bauxite, and connected with the Missouri Pacific at BN Junction. For the railroad's first 100 years, it was a wholly owned subsidiary of the Aluminum Company of America.

The connection for the old Rock Island is now gone, but the remnants are still visible, including a bridge over the Rock Island roadbed and local highway.

Current motive power are two EMD MP15DC locomotives, and an EMD SW1500, housed in a two-stall enginehouse just outside the Alcoa plant. Former power was an ALCO RS-3 diesel.
