= Delaware Valley Railway =

Railway in Pennsylvania, the United States

Overview
- Reporting mark: DV
- Locale: Eastern Pennsylvania and Delaware
- Dates of operation: 1994–1999
- Predecessor: Octoraro Railroad
- Successor: Brandywine Valley Railroad

Technical
- Track gauge: 4 ft 8 1/2 in (1,435 mm) standard gauge

The Delaware Valley Railway (reporting mark DV) was a short-line railroad in southeastern Pennsylvania and northern Delaware in the United States. The railroad was owned by RailAmerica. The Delaware Valley Railway operated two lines: one running from Elsmere, Delaware north to Modena, Pennsylvania and one running from Sylmar, Pennsylvania to Wawa, Pennsylvania. The railroad interchanged with CSX Transportation in Elsmere and the Brandywine Valley Railroad in Modena. The Delaware Valley Railway took over operations of these lines from the Octoraro Railroad on July 1, 1994. In 1999, the Delaware Valley Railway ceased operations, with the Brandywine Valley Railroad taking over operations of these lines. These lines are currently operated by the East Penn Railroad.
