= Puget Sound and Pacific Railroad =

Transport company

Overview
- Parent company: Genesee & Wyoming
- Headquarters: Centralia
- Reporting mark: PSAP
- Locale: Washington
- Dates of operation: August 30, 1997–
- Predecessor: BNSF Railway

Technical
- Track gauge: 4 ft 8 1/2 in (1,435 mm) standard gauge
- Length: 131 miles (211 km)

Other
- Website: gwrr.com/psap/

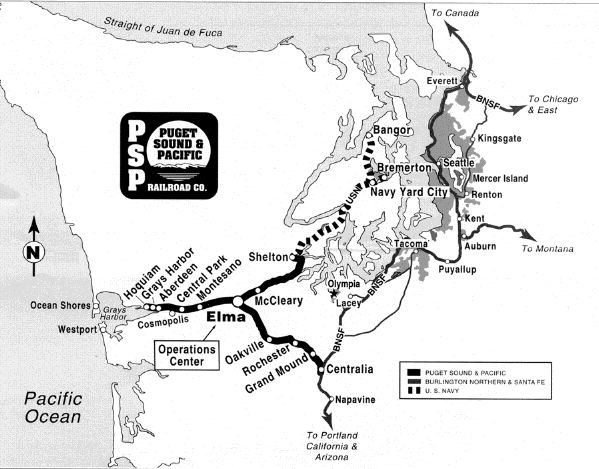
Operations map of the Puget Sound & Pacific Railroad during RailAmerica ownership.

The Puget Sound and Pacific Railroad (reporting mark PSAP) is a Class III shortline railroad that operates 131 miles (211 km) of track serving the Kitsap Peninsula, Grays Harbor County and Centralia, Washington in the U.S. State of Washington, and is headquartered in Centralia, where the railroad interchanges with the BNSF Railway and the Union Pacific Railroad. The railroad has been a subsidiary of the Genesee and Wyoming since 2012.

== History ==
Much of the line was originally constructed by the Puget Sound & Grays Harbor Railroad in 1890. The Northern Pacific Railway purchased this line from Summit, Washington, to Montesano shortly after the PS&GH started operations. The NP then completed a line from Centralia to Elma and from Montesano to Grays Harbor bringing rail service to Grays Harbor in 1892.

The company began operations on August 30, 1997, when the line was purchased from the Burlington Northern Santa Fe Railway (BNSF) by the ParkSierra Railgroup, which also formed the Arizona and California Railroad and the California Northern Railroad. The ParkSierra Railgroup was purchased in January 2002 by RailAmerica. In 2012, RailAmerica, along with the PSAP, was purchased by Genesee and Wyoming Inc with an STB approval in December 2012.

The PSAP interchanges with BNSF Railway and Union Pacific Railroad near Centralia, Washington. From there, the line reaches west to Grays Harbor, Washington, and northeast to Bangor Base, Washington, a total of nearly 80 miles (130 km). This line serves Naval Base Kitsap with its only rail connection to the rest of the North American rail network.

== Operations ==
The railroad's main commodities are timber products, garbage, and chemicals. In the 2010s, the Port of Grays Harbor saw a steady increase in business due to the Army Corps of Engineers deepening of the navigation channel to 38 feet (from 36 feet) and other port-facility improvements undertaken by the Port of Grays Harbor Commission. The improvements made (or planned) include the addition of more than nine miles of trackage in order to handle unit trains of up to 110 cars. Though small compared to the nearby Ports of Seattle and Tacoma, its location directly on the Pacific Coast makes the Port of Grays Harbor slightly closer to Asian ports than those located on Puget Sound. This results in savings in transit time and specialized-personnel costs.

The PSAP line from Centralia, Washington to Grays Harbor, Washington now has unit grain, soy bean, soda ash, auto, garbage, and military trains in addition to their regular local traffic. BNSF Railway and Union Pacific Railroad locomotives run through on unit trains to Grays Harbor, Washington for transshipment. These run-through trains are operated by PSAP crews. The PSAP hauled around 80,000 carloads in 2011.

== Subdivisions ==
=== Elma Subdivision ===
The Elma Subdivision is the primary mainline for the Puget Sound and Pacific Railroad and is approximately 70 miles in length. The Elma Sub starts in Centralia, Washington, Milepost 5, and ends in Hoquiam, Washington, Milepost 75. This subdivision handles traffic to and from the Port of Grays Harbor including grain, autos, soda ash, soybean, garbage, manifest, and local trains.

=== Shelton Subdivision ===
The Shelton Subdivision stretches from Elma, Washington to Shelton, Washington and is approximately 26 miles in length. The primary commodities on the Shelton Sub are lumber, garbage, and propane gas cars. The loaded lumber comes from the Simpson Timber Railroad, which is part of the Simpson Investment Company empire. Garbage comes from the Kitsap County, Washington Olympic View Transfer Station in Bremerton, Washington. The garbage is loaded into container cars and is shipped via rail to Waste Management's Columbia Ridge Landfill in Arlington, Oregon. Propane is heavily used by Kitsap County, Washington residents in the fall, winter, and spring months and comes in via rail for destinations in Shelton, Washington, Belfair, Washington, and Bremerton, Washington.

=== Bangor & Bremerton Subdivisions ===
The Bangor Subdivision stretches from Shelton, Washington to Bangor Base, Washington and is approximately 48 miles in length. Primary commodities are the same as the Shelton Subdivision with the addition of military and other U.S. Government traffic from Naval Base Kitsap in Bremerton, Washington and Bangor Base, Washington. At Bremerton Junction, Milepost 32.1 on the Bangor Sub, the line splits and the Bangor Subdivision continues northwest to Silverdale, Washington and Bangor while the Bremerton Subdivision continues northeast to Bremerton, Washington.
