= Texas Northeastern Railroad =

American shortline railroad

Overview
- Headquarters: Garland, Texas
- Reporting mark: TNER
- Locale: Texas
- Dates of operation: 1990–present

Technical
- Track gauge: 4 ft 8 1/2 in (1,435 mm) standard gauge
- Length: 104 miles (167 km)

The Texas Northeastern Railroad (reporting mark TNER) is a Class III railroad operating in the United States state of Texas that began operations in 1990. It consists of 104 miles (167 km) of track on two lines.

- One line runs from Bonham, Texas to Sherman, Texas, with a branch from Bells, Texas to Trenton, Texas. The TNER operates via trackage rights over the BNSF from Sherman to Denison, Texas. Connections are made with the BNSF Railway at Sherman, the Union Pacific Railroad at Denison and sister railroad Dallas, Garland and Northeastern Railroad at Trenton.
- Another line runs from New Boston, Texas to Texarkana, Texas. Connections on this line are with the Union Pacific and Kansas City Southern Railroad at Texarkana.

The railroad originally consisted of a through route between Whitesboro and Texarkana, originally owned by the Missouri Pacific Railroad, but abandoned the section between Whitesboro and Sherman in 1991, and in sections the route between Paris and New Boston during the late 1990s and early 2000s. Service was discontinued on the section between Bonham and Paris in the early 2000s; although the line is still intact and has been sold to Fannin County, who is currently searching for a carrier to operate the line.

In 1998, the operations of the TNER were merged with the operations of sister railroad DGNO. The TNER is operated entirely by DGNO and basically exists only on paper.

In 2000, the holding company RailAmerica purchased the railroad. Another holding company, Genesee & Wyoming Inc., purchased RailAmerica in late 2012.

The railroad's traffic comes mainly from aggregates, grain, fertilizer and plastic products, as well as military equipment to and from the Red River Army Depot. The TNER hauled around 10,000 carloads in 2008.
