= Brandywine Valley Railroad =

Overview
- Headquarters: Coatesville, Pennsylvania
- Reporting mark: BVRY
- Locale: Coatesville, Pennsylvania
- Dates of operation: 1981–

Technical
- Track gauge: 4 ft 8 1/2 in (1,435 mm) standard gauge

The Brandywine Valley Railroad (reporting mark BVRY) is a class III railroad operating in Pennsylvania.

It was established in 1981 by the Lukens Steel Company to operate trackage at Coatesville, Pennsylvania and the neighboring town of Modena and bought the 3.6 miles of track from Conrail for $400,000 in 1982.

It was acquired, with the rest of the Lukens properties, by Bethlehem Steel Corporation in 1998.

The Brandywine Valley's main line was originally built by the Wilmington and Northern Railroad, largely following the Brandywine Creek, to connect Reading with Wilmington, Delaware. By the time of the Brandywine Valley's formation, the line had been abandoned north of Valley Station, just north of Coatesville. BVRY took over the line from this point, the site of an interchange with Amtrak's Keystone Corridor, south to Modena, below which the ex-W&N was owned by PennDOT and operated by a number of short lines over the years.

Under Bethlehem operation, BVRY took over the operation of the Delaware Valley Railroad, then operating the remainder of the ex-Wilmington and Northern, in early 1999. This gave the railroad interchange access not only to Conrail at Coatesville (subsequently replaced by the Norfolk Southern Railway), but to CSX Transportation at the southern end of the line at Elsmere, Delaware. Hence, it also began to operate a connecting branch of the former Pennsylvania Railroad from Chadds Ford, Pennsylvania, on the W&N, to Nottingham.

After the acquisition of Bethlehem Steel's assets by International Steel Group in 2003, Brandywine Valley began to scale back its operations. The ex-PRR line, also known as the Octoraro line, was taken over in that year by the Morristown and Erie Railroad. In 2005, the ex-W&N line south of Modena was turned over to the East Penn Railroad, reducing the Brandywine Valley to its original extent.

With the merger of ISG in 2005, the railroad and steel plant were taken over by Mittal Steel Company, which became ArcelorMittal in 2006.

An article in Progressive Railroading dated November 9, 2020 announced that Cleveland-Cliffs Inc. "intends to acquire control of six short lines owned by ArcelorMittal USA LLC," which will include the Brandywine Valley Railroad.
