= Massena Terminal Railroad =

Class III railroad in New York

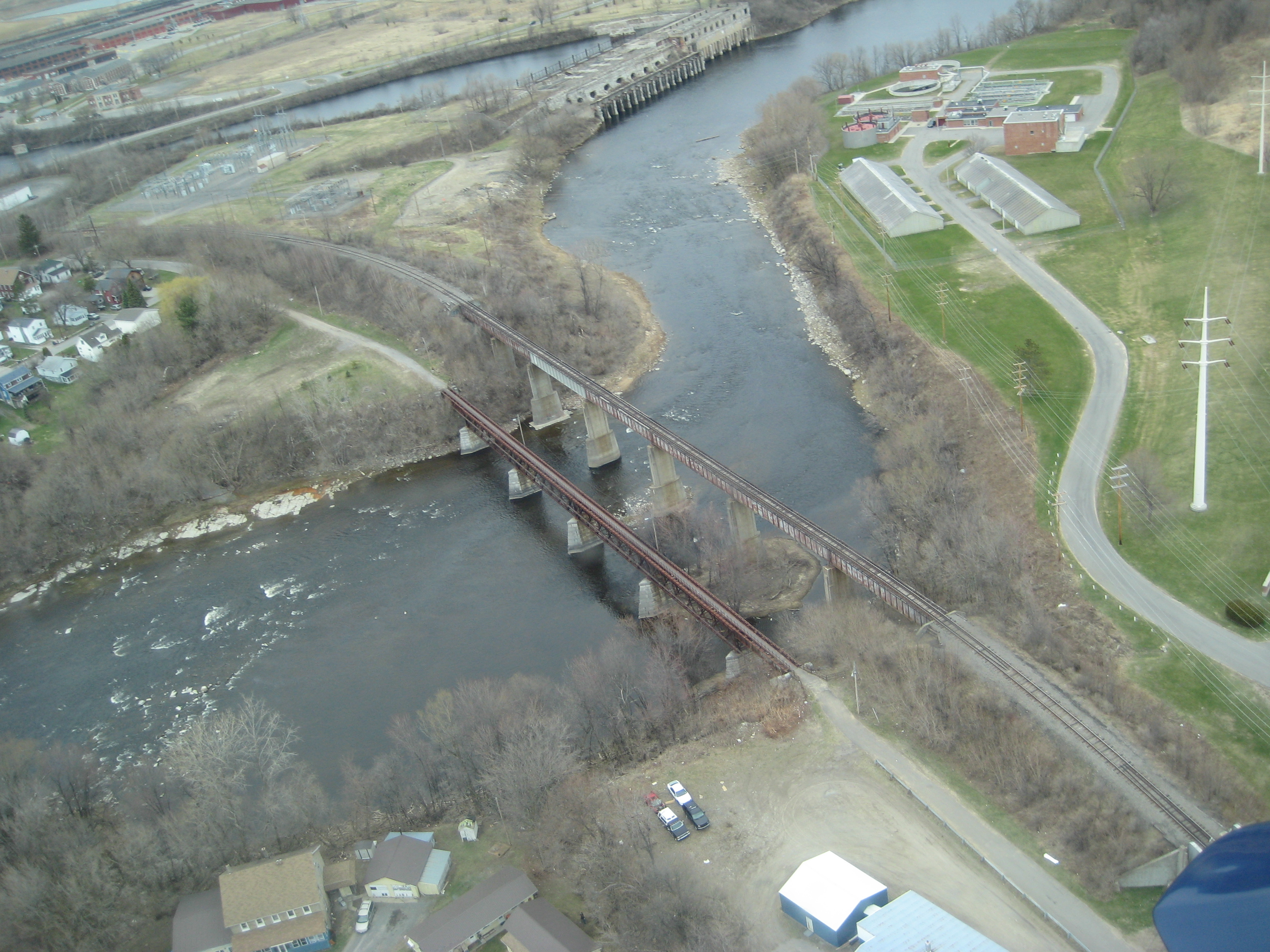
- The company's current and former bridges over the Grasse River

Overview
- Parent company: Genesee and Wyoming
- Headquarters: Massena, New York
- Reporting mark: MSTR
- Locale: Massena, New York
- Dates of operation: 1900–present

Technical
- Track gauge: 4 ft 8 1/2 in (1,435 mm) standard gauge
- Length: 3 miles (4.8 km)

Other
- Website: Official website

The Massena Terminal Railroad (reporting mark MSTR) is a Class III terminal railroad operating in the U.S. state of New York. It operates 3 miles (4.8 km) of track from a connection at the CSX Transportation yard in Massena north to the Alcoa plant, the railroad's only customer. It was built in the early 20th century, beginning operations in 1900. In 2005, the railroad was purchased by holding company RailAmerica. Shortline holding company Genesee & Wyoming acquired the Massena Terminal Railroad in 2012 as part of its purchase of RailAmerica. The railroad's traffic comes mainly from aluminum and petroleum products. The MTR hauled around 4,300 carloads in 2008.

== History ==
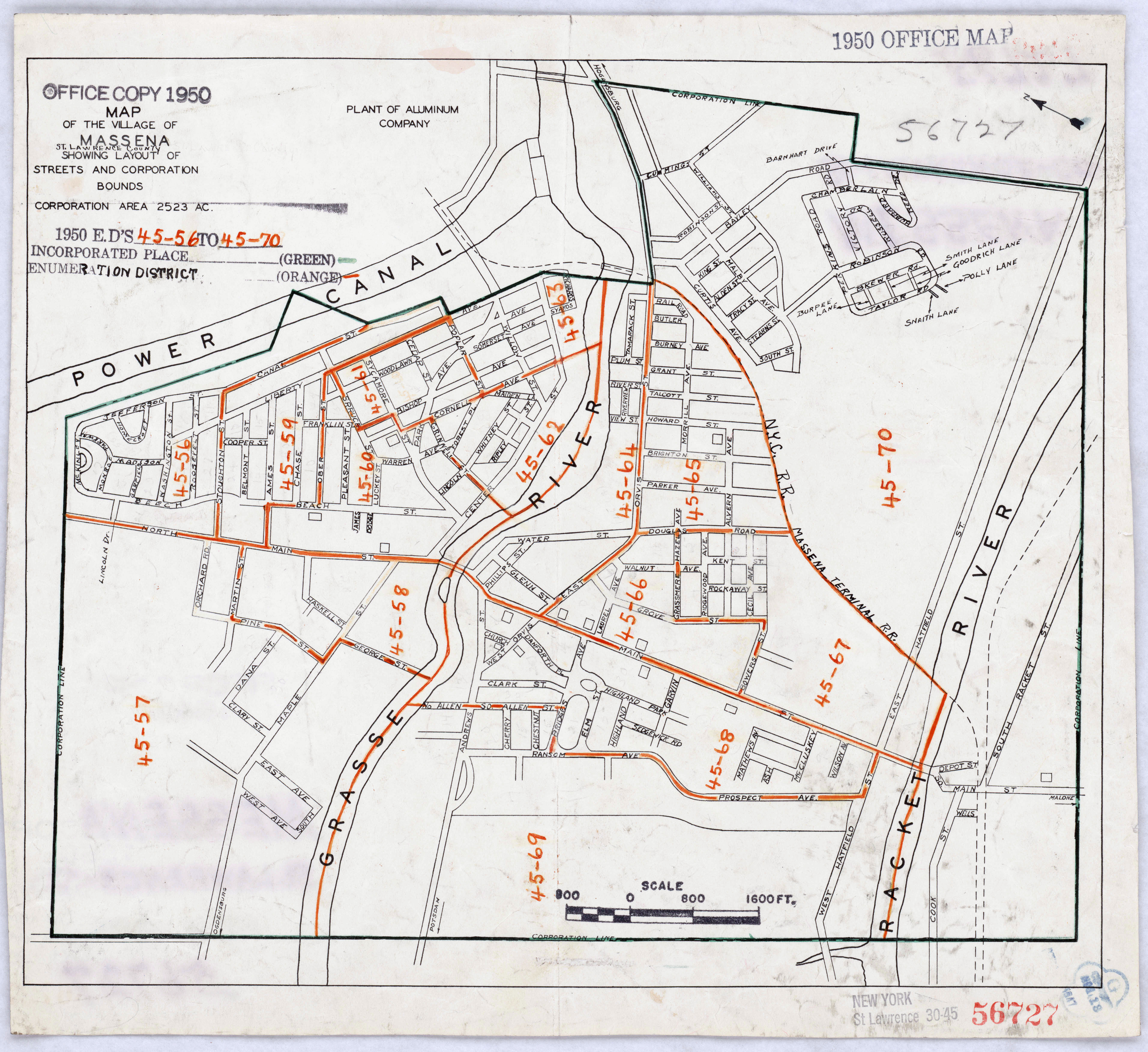
A 1950 map shows part of the Massena Terminal Railroad's route, labeled "N.Y.C. R.R. - Massena Terminal R.R.".

The Massena Terminal Railroad was incorporated in May 1900, to connect a power plant of the St. Lawrence Power Company to the Rome, Watertown and Ogdensburg Railroad and Grand Trunk Railway at Massena. The New York Central Railroad took over rail operations for the MTR in 1915, with the latter remaining owner of the physical infrastructure.

Significant traffic was carried by the Massena Terminal Railroad during the construction of the St. Lawrence Seaway; new tracks were laid to support the project, and then removed upon its completion. When the company had its bridge across the Grasse River replaced in 1946, it included an Alcoa-designed all-aluminum bridge span that was reportedly the first in the world.

The New York Central Railroad announced an agreement to purchase the MTR from Alcoa in 1966, with Alcoa citing "improved operating efficiencies" as the reason for the sale. Alcoa ultimately continued to own the railroad until 2005, when it was purchased by shortline holding company RailAmerica. The railroad was assigned to RailAmerica's Northeast Region in 2008. RailAmerica was itself purchased by fellow shortline holding company Genesee & Wyoming in 2012, which became the Massena Terminal Railroad's owner. The railroad received a $1.6 million grant from the New York State Department of Transportation in 2013 for infrastructure improvements.

== Operations ==
The company's primary customer is an Alcoa facility in Massena. The MTR connects this facility with a CSX Transportation line also in Massena. In 2008, the company reported approximately 4,300 carloads. As of 2024, the Massena Terminal Railroad has a total of 3 miles (4.8 km) of tracks.
