= Grand Rapids Eastern Railroad =

Railroad in western Michigan, United States

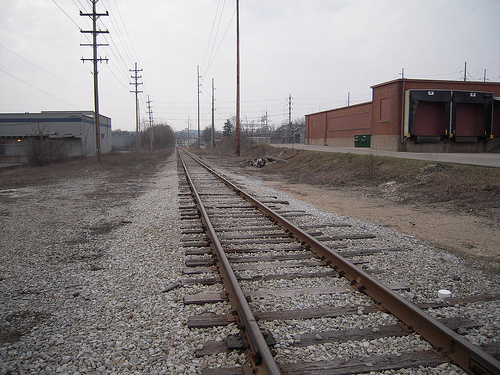
- Grand Rapids Eastern Railroad, looking west from Fuller in Grand Rapids

Overview
- Headquarters: Vassar, Michigan
- Reporting mark: GR
- Locale: Grand Rapids, Michigan
- Dates of operation: 1993–

Technical
- Track gauge: 4 ft 8 1/2 in (1,435 mm) standard gauge
- Length: 21 miles (34 km)

Other
- Website: Official website

The Grand Rapids Eastern Railroad (reporting mark GR) is a railroad in western Michigan, United States. The line runs east–west through Grand Rapids, Michigan to Lowell. Its 21 miles (34 km) of trackage ends at the Saint Mary's Siding, where it meets the Coopersville and Marne Railway. It interchanges with CSX Transportation, Coopersville and Marne Railway, and the Grand Elk Railroad at Grand Rapids, Michigan. It was established in 1993 and purchased by RailAmerica in 2000. The railroad was later acquired by Genesee & Wyoming Inc. as part of its acquisition of RailAmerica in late 2012.

As of 2023, the railroad can handle freight cars with loads up to 286,000 pounds.

Most of the railroad's traffic comes from grain, lumber, and sodium carbonate. The GR hauled around 1,250 carloads in 2008.

The Grand Rapids Eastern only has three customers on its line currently: Precision Poly in Grand Rapids, Amway in Ada, and King Milling in Lowell. King Milling is the largest customer on the line. King Milling receives grain to make into flour. In the past, King Milling has attempted to ship out flour via the GRE, however, the process takes too long for the customers. The flour is not currently shipped by rail.
