= Huron and Eastern Railway =

Short line railroad in Michigan, US

Overview
- Parent company: Genesee and Wyoming
- Headquarters: Vassar, Michigan
- Reporting mark: HESR
- Locale: Michigan
- Dates of operation: 1986–present
- Predecessor: Saginaw Valley, Central Michigan Railway, CSX, Tuscola and Saginaw Bay Railway

Technical
- Track gauge: 4 ft 8 1/2 in (1,435 mm) standard gauge
- Length: 331 miles (533 km)

Other
- Website: Official website

Huron and Eastern Railway (reporting mark HESR) is a short line railroad operating 331 miles (533 km) of track in The Thumb and Flint/Tri-Cities area of the lower peninsula of Michigan. It is currently owned by Genesee & Wyoming, Inc., who purchased it from RailAmerica in 2012. Its headquarters is in the former Michigan Central Railroad depot in Vassar, Michigan.

== History ==
HESR began operations in 1986, over 83 miles of former Chesapeake and Ohio track in Michigan's thumb area. This track served areas in Huron and Sanilac Counties, roughly between Bad Axe and Croswell, with a few spurs to outlying small towns. On December 22, 1988, HESR acquired CSX Transportation's Bad Axe Subdivision between Saginaw and Bad Axe.

On January 22, 1991, HESR again added more track to its system, acquiring a cluster of former Penn Central lines from the Tuscola and Saginaw Bay Railway. This new track crossed the current HESR track in Reese, and allowed the HESR to now serve Vassar and Caro, among other towns. On April 30, 1998, HESR purchased CSX's Port Huron Subdivision from Saginaw to Brown City. The line beyond Brown City is still in place to Avoca, but has been out of service since the HESR acquisition.

On January 26, 2004, HESR again increased in size with the acquisition of the Central Michigan Railway, allowing the HESR to reach Bay City and Midland, as well as interchange with Class I Canadian National in Durand. Furthermore, in May 2004, RailAmerica underwent an inter-corporate merger between the Saginaw Valley Railway and HESR. Saginaw Valley, who operated a line from Buena Vista to Denmark Junction. The result was another Huron and Eastern line extending east from Saginaw. Due to the merger, HESR is sometimes referred to as the Huron and Eastern Saginaw Valley Railroad.

The former Saginaw Valley line east to Richville and was soon abandoned with the exception of a two-mile segment from Richville to Denmark Junction. HESR had three parallel lines into Saginaw from the east, and the line was in desperate need of repair. Other than the former Saginaw Valley line, Huron and Eastern has abandoned very little track.

== Today ==
Huron and Eastern's locomotive power is a mix of former Central Michigan, Saginaw Valley, and original HESR rolling stock.

The railway's main line extends northeast from Saginaw to Bad Axe, and then southeast to Croswell.

HESR has over 100 freight railroads around Mid-Michigan, and 140 and more Transloading access points.

HESR's other line extends from Midland east to Bay City, and then south, through Saginaw to Durand. The line was former Central Michigan Railway and Grand Trunk Western Railroad track.

HESR interchanges with Canadian National Railway and Great Lakes Central Railroad in Durand; and Lake State Railway in Saginaw and Bay City.

The railroad's traffic comes largely from agricultural products, as well as industrial goods, such as cement, fly ash, and chemicals. The HESR hauled around 34,000 carloads in 2008.
