= Corpus Christi Terminal Railroad =

Overview
- Headquarters: Corpus Christi, Texas
- Reporting mark: CCPN
- Locale: Corpus Christi, Texas
- Dates of operation: 1924–

Technical
- Track gauge: 4 ft 8 1/2 in (1,435 mm) standard gauge

The Corpus Christi Terminal Railroad (reporting mark CCPN) was a terminal railroad originally created in 1924 to facilitate heavy bulk freight cargo traffic flow from the recently completed deep water port channel of the new Corpus Christi Port. Wishing to maximize freight handling potential while holding down rates, the Port Authority decided to allow traffic to all of its docks and facilities by no less than three competing railroads, the Southern Pacific, the Missouri Pacific and the Tex Mex railroads. To accomplish this the Port of Corpus Christi Authority built its own trackage along the channel and to the docks, and allowed all three carriers access to it. While the Authority's scheme at first heightened tensions among the three railroads, they eventually began to cooperate, assuring a good flow of bulk freight and the eventual success of the Port facilities.

On August 3, 1997, Rail Link, a wholly owned subsidiary of Genesee & Wyoming., leased the lines and took over day-to-day operation of the railroad, though the 26 miles (42 km) of physical trackage is still owned by the Port of Corpus Christi Authority. As of 2007 railroad connections existed with the Union Pacific, BNSF and Texas Mexican railroads.

== Motive power ==
Road No.	Builder	Model	Orig. Built as	Bld Date	Built For	Rebuilt For	Rebuilt Date	Color Scheme / Notes
339	EMD	SW1500		3/1972	Penn Central	Conrail		GWI
457	EMD	CF7	F7A		Santa Fe			CCTR
475	EMD	CF7	F7As 263L	8/1951	Santa Fe		10/1976	CCTR - Nose Logo
547	EMD	CF7	F7As 231L	3/1950	Santa Fe		10/1973	CCTR - Nose Logo
9576	EMD	SW1500		10/1973	Penn Central	Conrail		GWI
9591	EMD	SW1500		7/1966	Reading Company	Conrail		GWI

Table information

Note: The company's general manager has confirmed that CF7s are no longer on the company roster. No. 475 and No. 547 remained in the local area after being sold to ADM Grain, 2122 Navigation Boulevard, Corpus Christi, TX 78402 and repainted in silver with black tops. They can be easily seen from Navigation Boulevard. Additionally, EMD GP locomotives with G&W paint schemes have been added to the CCPN roster.
