= Red Deer Railway =

- Red Deer Railway Ltd.

Overview
- Parent company: Genesee & Wyoming
- Headquarters: Red Deer, Alberta
- Reporting mark: RDRY
- Locale: Alberta, Canada
- Dates of operation: 2024–present
- Predecessor: Canadian Pacific Kansas City

Technical
- Track gauge: 1,435 mm (4 ft 8 1/2 in)
- Length: 43 mi (69 km)

Other
- Website: gwrr.com/rdr

Red Deer Railway is a shortline railroad in Alberta, Canada, operated by Genesee & Wyoming. The railway began operations on 2 December 2024 and became Genesee & Wyoming's first railroad in western Canada and its first newly created subsidiary in a decade.

The railway operates on the former Canadian Pacific Kansas City (CPKC) Hoadley Subdivision between Homeglen and Jackson, with additional operating rights south to Red Deer and east to the towns of Chigwell and Prentiss in Lacombe County. It interchanges with CPKC in Red Deer and primarily serves energy industry customers.

== History ==
Red Deer Railway was created as part of an agreement associated with Genesee & Wyoming's sale of a portion of its Meridian and Bigbee Railroad in Alabama to CPKC. Under the arrangement, Genesee & Wyoming acquired rail assets and operating rights in Alberta from CPKC.

The railway officially launched operations on 2 December 2024 in Bentley, Alberta. At the start of operations, the company employed 10 people and operated three locomotives.

== Operations ==
Red Deer Railway operates approximately 43 miles (69 km) of rail line between Homeglen and Jackson, located midway between Calgary and Edmonton. The track also has operating rights over a further 36 miles (58 km) of CPKC tracks to Red Deer, Chigwell and Prentiss. The railway provides freight service, railcar storage, transloading, and switching services. The system also includes storage capacity for approximately 110 railcars.
