= Michigan Shore Railroad =

Overview
- Parent company: Genesee and Wyoming
- Headquarters: Vassar, Michigan
- Locale: Michigan
- Dates of operation: 2012–present

Technical
- Track gauge: 4 ft 8 1/2 in (1,435 mm) standard gauge
- Length: 53 miles (85 km)

Other
- Website: www.gwrr.com/ms

The Michigan Shore Railroad (reporting mark MS) is a short line railroad in the United States owned by Genesee & Wyoming that operates 53 miles (85 km) of track, connecting Fremont to CSX at West Olive, Michigan with trackage rights extending south to Holland, Michigan.

The railroad began operations in 1990, and was purchased by RailAmerica in 2000 which itself was purchased by Genesee & Wyoming in 2012.

The railroad's traffic comes mainly from sand and chemical products. They haul mainly sand and chemicals for the Webb Chemical Company in Muskegon Heights and sand for the Nugent Sand Company near Grand Haven. The MS hauled around 6,300 carloads in 2008.

== Equipment ==
Locomotive model	Road number
EMD GP38-2 RS3L	2170
EMD GP-38 P5	2019
