= Dallas, Garland and Northeastern Railroad =

Short line railroad in North Texas

Dallas, Garland & Northeastern Railroad

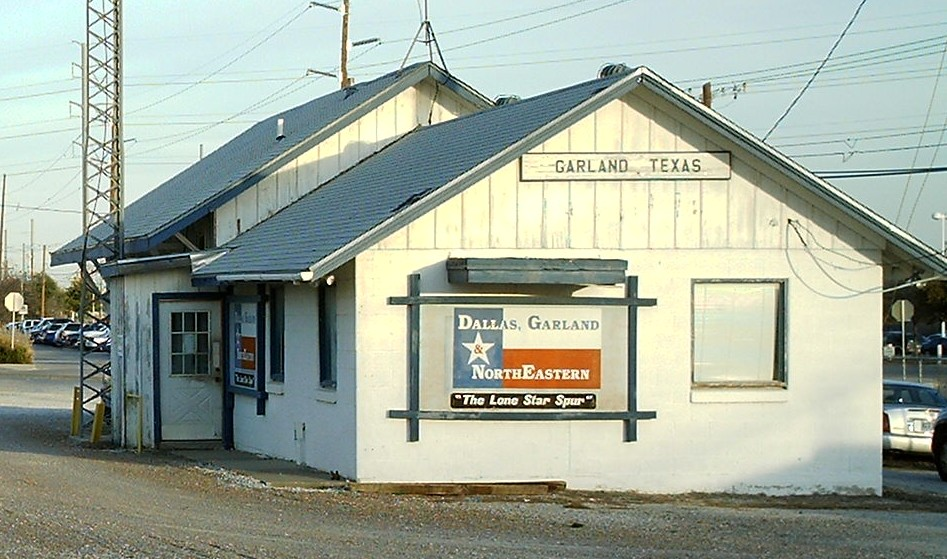
- Former Garland depot (demolished in 2013)

Overview
- Parent company: Genesee & Wyoming
- Headquarters: Garland, Texas
- Reporting mark: DGNO
- Locale: North Texas
- Dates of operation: 1992–
- Predecessor: Union Pacific (Garland/Trenton segment)

Technical
- Track gauge: 4 ft 8 1/2 in (1,435 mm)
- Length: 170 miles (270 km)

Other
- Website: Official website

The Dallas, Garland & Northeastern Railroad (reporting mark DGNO) is a short-line railroad headquartered in Garland, Texas. The railroad operates over 170 miles (270 km) of track in the North Texas region. It is a subsidiary of short-line operator Genesee & Wyoming.

== Routes ==
DGNO consists of three major segments. Significant portions of these routes utilize track leased from Union Pacific or Dallas Area Rapid Transit.

- The northern segment connects McKinney and Sherman. The line extends further north to Denison through trackage rights with BNSF.
- The eastern segment connects Trenton, Greenville, and Garland.
- The western segment connects Dallas (specifically West Dallas), Carrollton, and Lake Dallas, with an additional spur connecting Carrollton to Richardson.

The Texas Northeastern Railroad (which is legally separate but shares operations with DGNO) connects the northern and eastern segments, while a CPKC corridor (which DGNO holds trackage rights to) connects the eastern and western segments. The line interfaces with all three Class I railroads in the area, namely BNSF, CPKC, and Union Pacific.

== History ==
In 1992, short-line operator Rail-Tex announced the creation of DGNO, a 62-mile (100 km) railroad connecting Garland, Greenville, and Trenton. The railroad would be based in Garland and would operate out of a depot built by the Missouri–Kansas–Texas Railroad (MKT). The proposed right-of-way was owned by Union Pacific; UP sold the Greenville/Trenton segment to Rail-Tex and leased the rest.

In 1999, DGNO leased an additional 89 miles (143 km) of track from Union Pacific and Dallas Area Rapid Transit (DART). This included a stretch of Union Pacific track between Plano and Sherman, as well as a DART-owned St. Louis Southwestern corridor between Carrollton and Plano. (The latter corridor would later become the basis for DART's Silver Line.) Also included in the deal were trackage rights to a Burlington Northern & Santa Fe corridor between Sherman and Irving.

In 2010, the railroad's Garland depot was relocated to a new site, located 1/2 mile (0.80 km) east of the MKT depot. This was done to accommodate the construction of a rail bridge over First Street and Lavon Drive (which was part of DART rail's extension from Garland to Downtown Rowlett). The MKT depot was demolished in 2013.

== Gallery ==
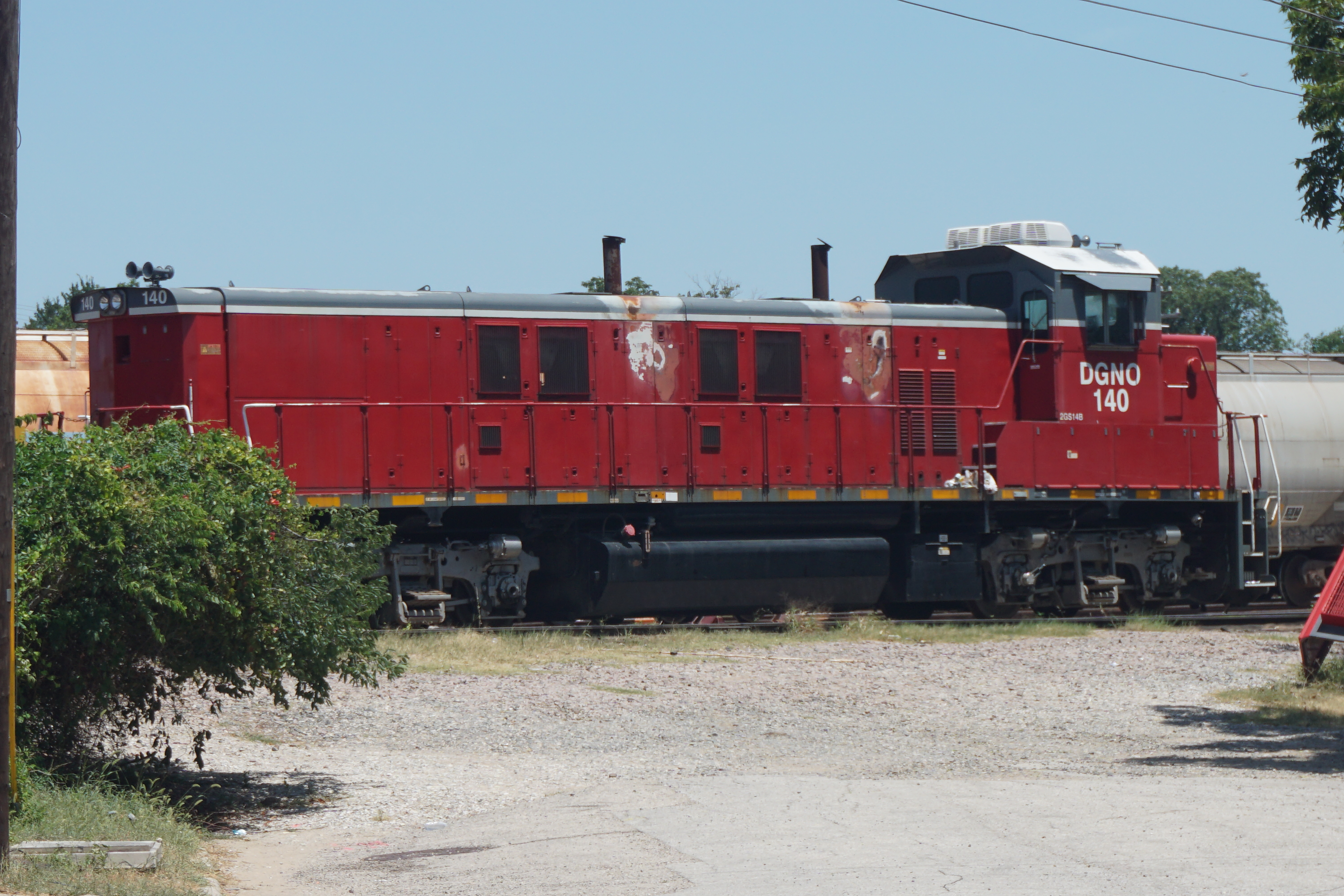
NRE 2GS14B No. 140: Switcher locomotive with RailTex coloration

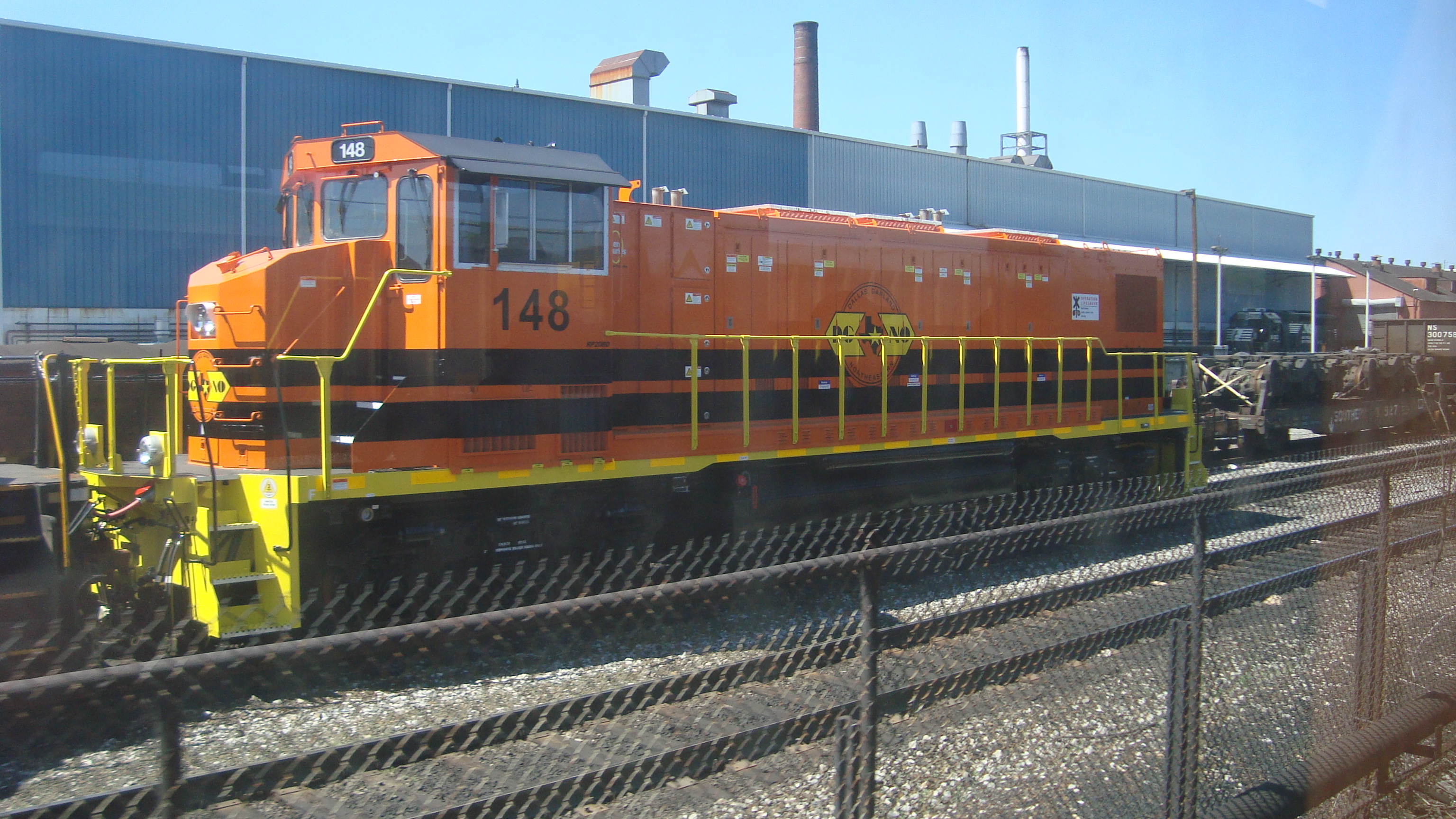
RP20BD No. 148: Genset locomotive with G&W coloration
