= Rockdale, Sandow and Southern Railroad =

Overview
- Reporting mark: RSS
- Locale: Texas
- Dates of operation: 1923–2019

Technical
- Track gauge: 4 ft 8 1/2 in (1,435 mm) standard gauge
- Length: 5 miles (8.0 km)

The Rockdale, Sandow and Southern Railroad (reporting mark RSS) was a Class III railroad operating in the United States state of Texas. It consisted of 5 miles (8.0 km) of track between Rockdale and Marjorie, Texas.

In 2005, the holding company RailAmerica purchased the railroad. It ultimately became part of Genesee & Wyoming's holdings.

The railroad's traffic came mainly from aluminum products, as well as other metals. RSS hauled around 6,100 carloads in 2008.

In December 2018, Alcoa Energy Services, which owned a closed smelter on the line, announced that it planned to acquire the railroad, which by that time was inactive, and a year later filed to abandon the line on the grounds that it had no realistic chance of obtaining customers.
