= EMD SW1500 =

Model of 1500 hp American diesel switching locomotive

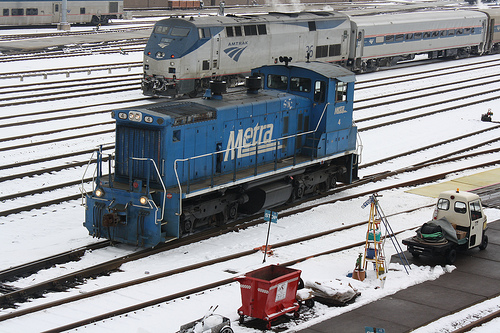
- NIRC 4 performs switching duties near Chicago Union Station
Type and origin
- Power type: Diesel
- Builder: General Motors Electro-Motive Division (EMD)
- Model: SW1500
- Build date: June 1966 – January 1974
- Total produced: 808
Specifications
- Configuration
  - AAR: B-B
  - UIC: Bo'Bo'
- Gauge: 4 ft 8 1/2 in (1,435 mm) standard gauge
- Length: 44 ft 8 in (13.61 m)
- Height: 15 feet (4.57 meters)
- Loco weight: 248,000 lb (112,491 kg)
- Prime mover: EMD 645
- Engine type: V12 2-stroke diesel
- Aspiration: Roots blower
- Displacement: 9,072 in^{3} (149 L)
- Generator: Main: D32
- Traction motors: D77/78DC
- Transmission: Diesel-electric
- Loco brake: Straight air
- Train brakes: Air
Performance figures
- Power output: 1,500 hp (1,119 kW)
- Tractive effort
  - Continuous: 42,250 lbf (187.94 kN)
Career
- Locale: North America South America

The EMD SW1500 is a 1,500 hp (1,119 kW) diesel-electric switcher locomotive built by General Motors' Electro-Motive Division from 1966 to 1974. The SW1500 replaced the SW1200 in the EMD product line. Many railroads regularly used SW1500s for road freight service.

It is similar in appearance to the EMD SW1000 model which had a different engine and had one exhaust stack while the SW1500 had two.

== Original owners ==
Domestic (US/Export) orders
| Railroad | Quantity | Road numbers |
|---|---|---|
| Alton and Southern Railway | 18 | 1500–1517 |
| Alcoa Terminal Railroad | 1 | 9 |
| Apalachicola Northern Railroad | 8 | 712–719 |
| Armco Steel | 5 | 701–705 |
| Ashley, Drew and Northern Railroad | 1 | 150 |
| Angelina and Neches River Railroad | 1 | 1500 |
| Belt Railway of Chicago | 3 | 530–532 |
| Burlington Northern Railroad | 15 | 310–324 |
| Cambria and Indiana Railroad | 2 | 15, 16 |
| Chattahoochee Valley Railway | 1 | 100 |
| Chicago Short Line Railroad | 2 | 30, 31 |
| General Motors Electro-Motive Division | 9 | 106–114 |
| Georgia Power | 5 | 1401–1402, 1405, 1503–1504 |
| W.R. Grace Chemical | 2 | 101, 102 |
| Great Northern Railway | 10 | 200–209 |
| Houston Belt and Terminal Railway | 6 | 50–55 |
| Howe Coal | 2 | 1, 2 |
| Indiana Harbor Belt Railroad | 27 | 9200–9221, 9223–9227 |
| Illinois Terminal Railroad | 7 | 1509–1515 |
| Indianapolis Union Railway | 5 | 24, 26, 30–32 |
| Inland Steel | 7 | 119–125 |
| Kansas City Southern Railway | 42 | 1500–1541 |
| Kentucky and Indiana Terminal Railroad | 16 | 67–68, 70–83 |
| Lake Erie, Franklin and Clarion Railroad | 2 | 23, 24 |
| Longview, Portland and Northern Railway | 1 | 130 |
| Louisville and Nashville Railroad | 30 | 5000–5029 |
| Minneapolis, Northfield and Southern Railway | 2 | 36–37 |
| Minnesota Taconite US Steel | 6 | 949–954 |
| Minnesota Transfer Railway | 7 | 300–306 |
| Mississippi Export Railroad | 1 | 64 |
| Missouri–Kansas–Texas Railroad | 6 | 50–55 |
| Missouri Pacific Railroad | 4 | 1518–1521 |
| New Orleans Public Belt Railroad | 3 | 151–153 |
| Patapsco and Back Rivers Railroad | 2 | 160, 161 |
| Penn Central | 84 | 9500–9583 |
| Pittsburgh and Lake Erie Railroad | 40 | 1534–1563, 9280–9289 |
| Reading Railroad | 21 | 2750–2770 |
| Richmond, Fredericksburg and Potomac Railroad | 9 | 1–8, 91 |
| Rock Island | 10 | 940–949 |
| Roscoe, Snyder and Pacific Railway | 2 | 500, 600 |
| St. Mary's Railroad | 1 | 503 |
| Sandersville Railroad | 2 | 100, 300 |
| St. Louis–San Francisco Railway | 46 | 315–360 |
| Southern Railway | 48 | 2300–2347 |
| Southern Pacific Railroad | 204 | 2450–2480, 2493–2510, 2523–2578, 2591–2689 |
| St. Louis Southwestern Railway | 36 | 2481–2492, 2511–2522, 2579–2590 |
| Tennessee Copper | 1 | 108 |
| Tennessee Eastman Corporation (Eastman Kodak) | 1 | 1 |
| Terminal Railroad Alabama State Docks | 2 | 681, 682 |
| Terminal Railroad Association of St. Louis | 17 | 1501–1517 |
| Toledo, Peoria and Western Railroad | 4 | 303–306 |
| Union Railroad | 9 | 1–9 |
| U S Pipe and Foundry | 4 | 51–54 |
| Vermont Railway | 1 | 501 |
| Weyerhaeuser Timber Co. | 2 | 306, 307 |
| Winifrede Railroad | 1 | 13 |
| Western Pacific Railroad | 3 | 1501–1503 |
Export orders
| Amapá Railway, Brazil | 1 | 5 |
| Total | 808 | |

== Preservation ==
Many SW1500s remain in active service, used mostly by shortlines, switching and terminal railroads, and railroad equipment leasing companies such as GATX. However, several examples of this popular model have been preserved:

- CSX #1100 (built 1970 as L&N #5000) is preserved and operational at the Kentucky Steam Heritage Corporation in Irvine, Kentucky.
- CSX #1103 (built 1970 as L&N #5003) is preserved and operational at the Kentucky Railway Museum in New Haven, Kentucky
- Western Pacific #1503 (built 1973) is preserved and operational at the Western Pacific Railroad Museum in Portola, California. It was donated to the museum by Union Pacific in 2011, and restored to its original paint scheme in 2019.
- Wisconsin Central #1563 (built 1971) is preserved and operational at the National Railroad Museum in Green Bay, Wisconsin. It was donated to the museum by Canadian National in 2019.

== See also ==
- List of GM-EMD locomotives
