= Modena, Pennsylvania =

Borough in Pennsylvania, US

- Borough
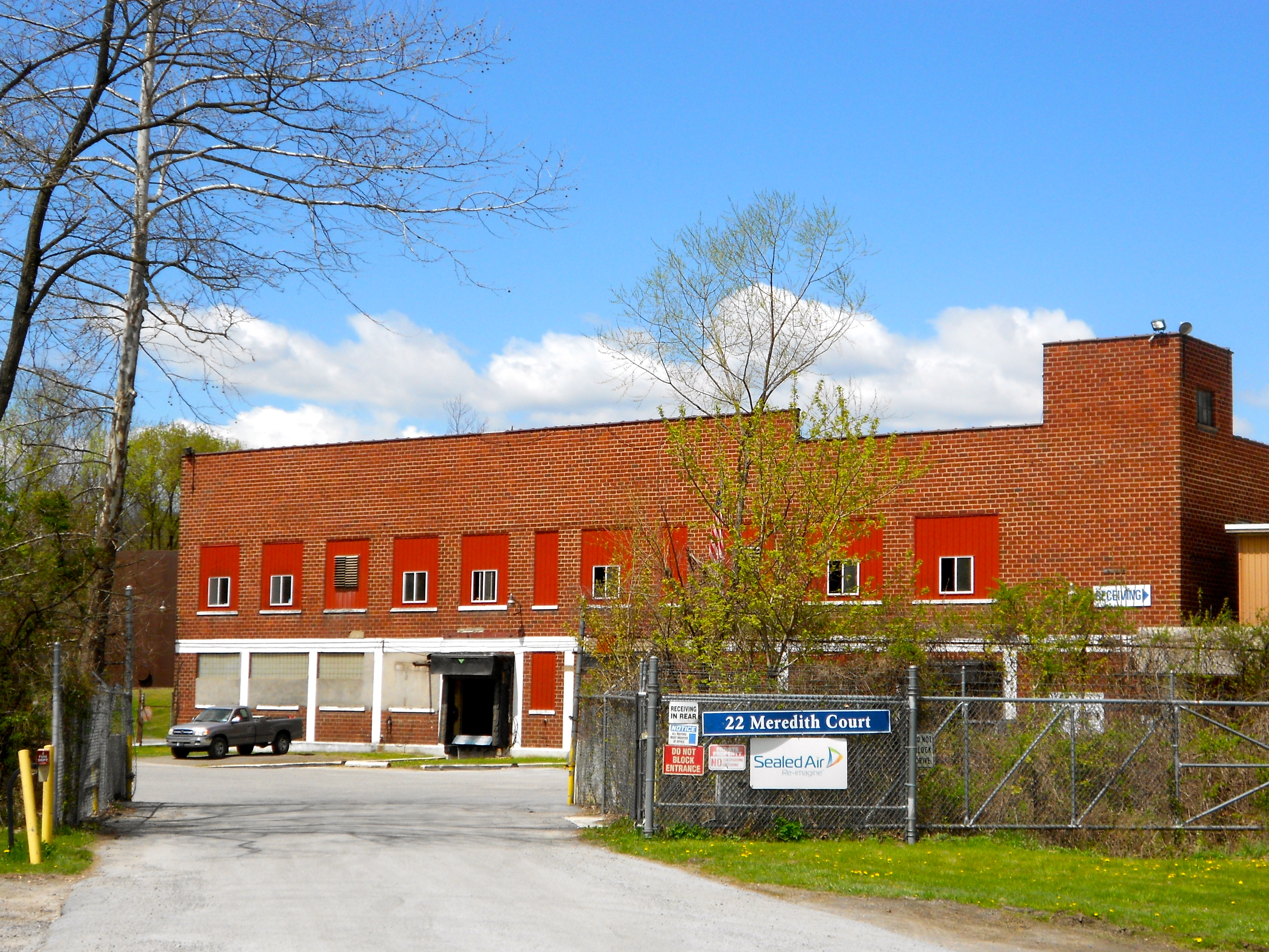
- Sealed Air plant

- Location in Chester County and the U.S. state of Pennsylvania

- Location in Pennsylvania Location in the United States
- Coordinates: 39°57′44″N 75°48′08″W
- Country: United States
- State: Pennsylvania
- County: Chester

Government
  - Mayor: Christina Puff

Area
  - Total: 0.35 sq mi (0.91 km^{2})
  - Land: 0.34 sq mi (0.89 km^{2})
  - Water: 0.0077 sq mi (0.02 km^{2})
- Elevation: 371 ft (113 m)

Population (2020)
  - Total: 541
  - Density: 1,571.0/sq mi (606.57/km^{2})
- Time zone: UTC-5 (EST)
  - Summer (DST): UTC-4 (EDT)
- ZIP code: 19358
- Area codes: 610 and 484
- FIPS code: 42-50232
- Website: boroughofmodenapa.org

Modena is a borough in Chester County, Pennsylvania, United States. The population was 544 at the 2020 census. It was originally called Modeville, after the local Mode family.

== Geography ==
Modena is located at 39°57′44″N 75°48′8″W (39.962256, -75.802158).

According to the United States Census Bureau, the borough has a total area of 0.3 square miles (0.78 km^{2}), all land.

== Transportation ==
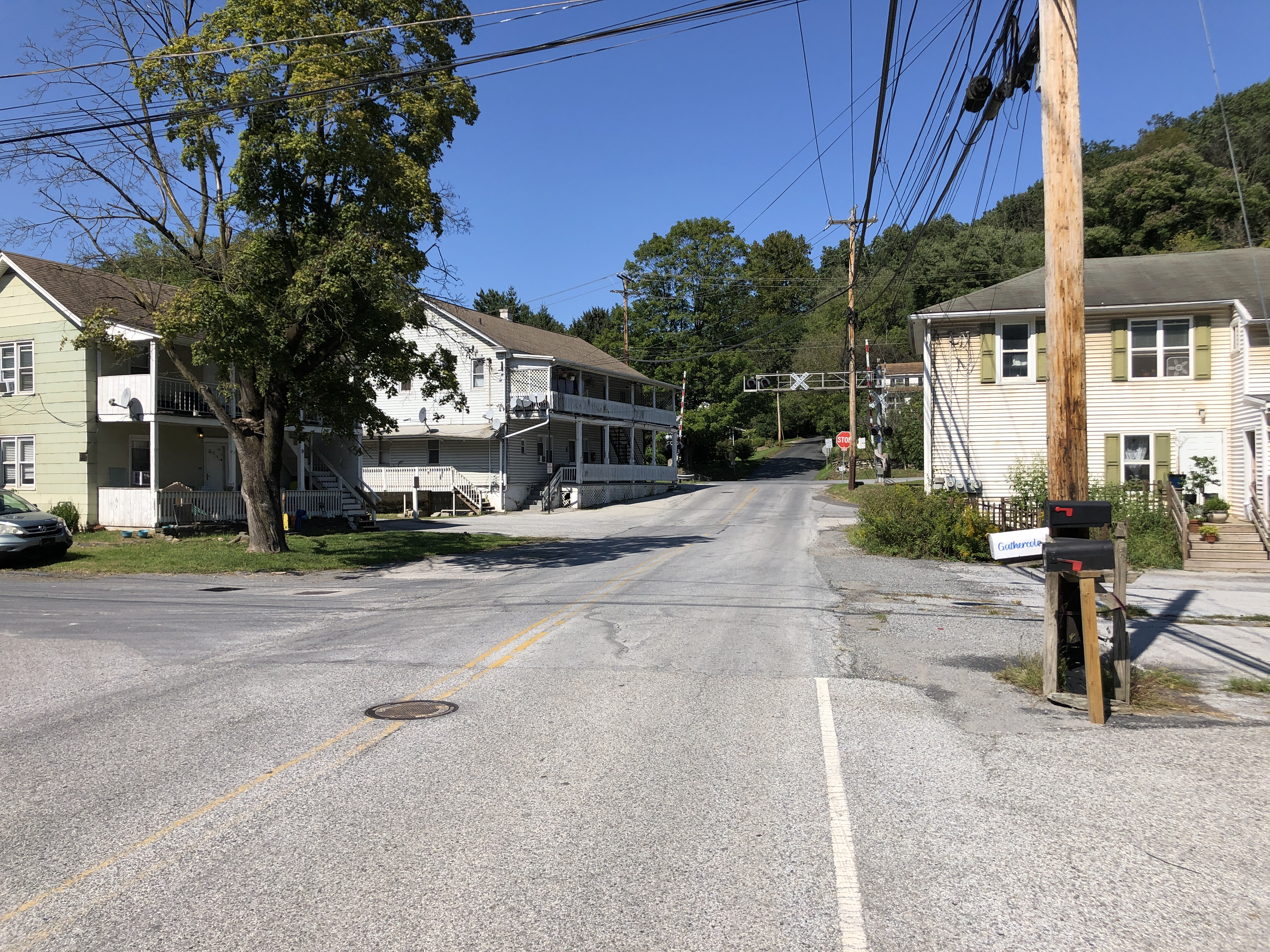
Union Street in Modena

As of 2011, there were 3.13 miles (5.04 km) of public roads in Modena, of which 1.15 miles (1.85 km) were maintained by Pennsylvania Department of Transportation (PennDOT) and 1.98 miles (3.19 km) were maintained by the borough.

No numbered highways serve Modena directly. Main thoroughfares in the borough include Union Street, Modena Road, Mortonville Road and Hephzibah Hill Road, all of which intersect near the center of town.

== Demographics ==
Historical population
Census	Pop.	Note	%±
1880	126		—
1930	599		—
1940	625		4.3%
1950	824		31.8%
1960	859		4.2%
1970	867		0.9%
1980	672		−22.5%
1990	563		−16.2%
2000	610		8.3%
2010	535		−12.3%
2020	541		1.1%
2021 (est.)	547	▲	1.1%

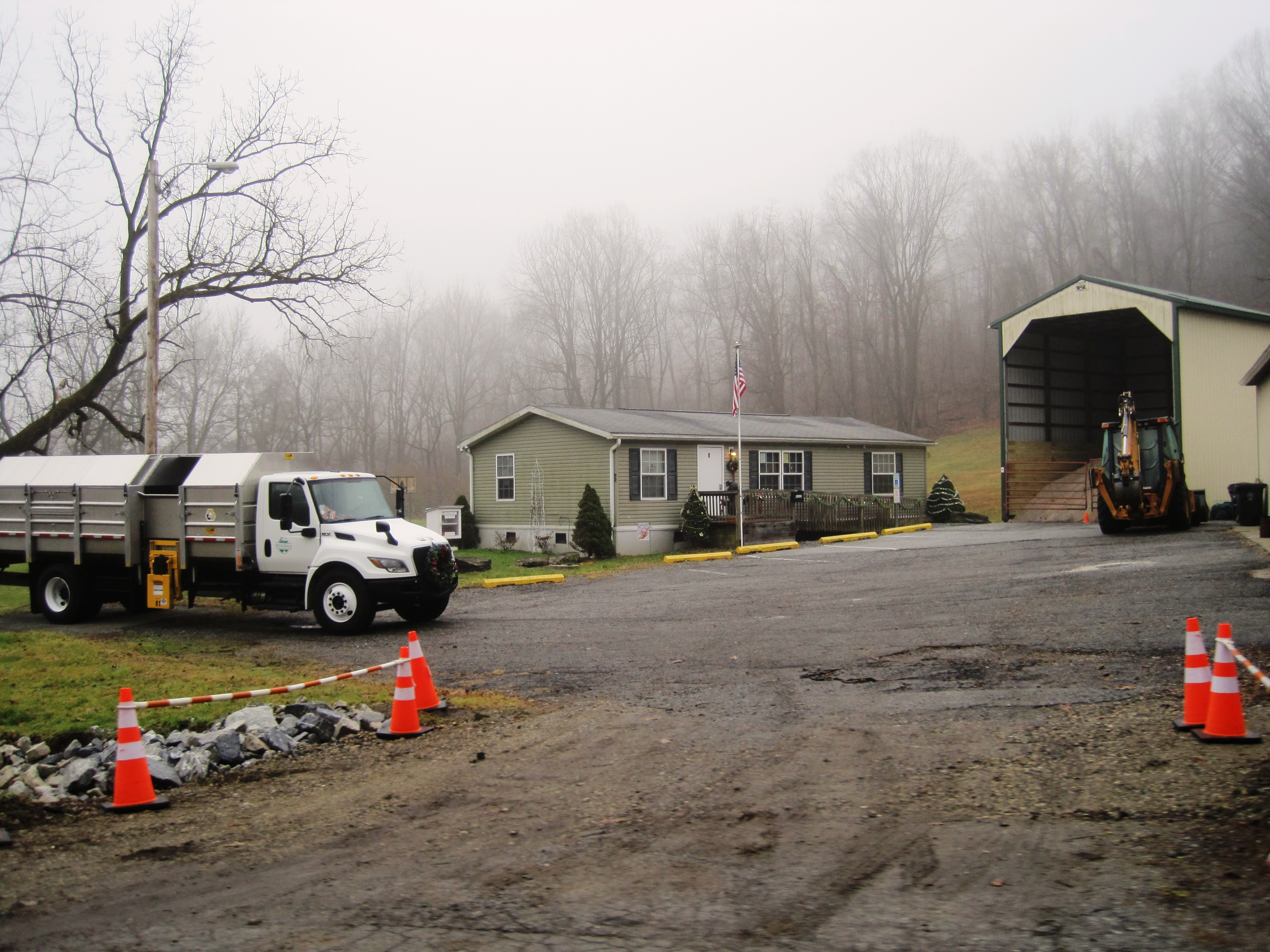
Modena Municipal Building

At the 2010 census, the borough was 56.6% non-Hispanic White, 22.6% Black or African American, 0.2% Native American, 0.6% Asian, and 5.0% were two or more races. 17.4% of the population were of Hispanic or Latino ancestry.

At the 2000 census there were 610 people, 200 households, and 160 families living in the borough. The population density was 1,847.4 inhabitants per square mile (713.3/km^{2}). There were 211 housing units at an average density of 639.0 per square mile (246.7/km^{2}). The racial makeup of the borough was 75.57% White, 18.03% African American, 0.49% Native American, 1.80% from other races, and 4.10% from two or more races. Hispanic or Latino of any race were 11.64%.

There were 200 households, 45.5% had children under the age of 18 living with them, 46.5% were married couples living together, 23.5% had a female householder with no husband present, and 20.0% were non-families. 14.5% of households were made up of individuals, and 3.5% were one person aged 65 or older. The average household size was 3.05 and the average family size was 3.33.

The age distribution was 36.4% under the age of 18, 8.4% from 18 to 24, 32.1% from 25 to 44, 15.9% from 45 to 64, and 7.2% 65 or older. The median age was 29 years. For every 100 females there were 95.5 males. For every 100 females age 18 and over, there were 84.8 males.

The median household income was $36,125 and the median family income was $34,000. Males had a median income of $32,000 versus $24,375 for females. The per capita income for the borough was $12,269. About 23.4% of families and 24.7% of the population were below the poverty line, including 29.4% of those under age 18 and 40.4% of those age 65 or over.

== Education ==
The school district is Coatesville Area School District.
