= List of reporting marks: G =

Note: Marks ending in U are for container owners; marks ending in X are not common carriers; marks ending in Z are for trailers without flanged wheels. All other marks are of common-carrier railroads.

== G ==
- GA - Georgia Railroad, Seaboard System Railroad, CSX Transportation
- GAAB - South Carolina Central Railroad (Georgia and Alabama Division)
- GABX - General American Marks Company
- GACX - General American Marks Company, GATX Corporation
- GAEX - General American Marks Company
- GAFX - Fuller Company
- GALX - Georgia Power Company
- GAMX - General American de Mexico, Arrendadora Nacional De Carros De Ferrocaril
- GANO - Georgia Northern Railway
- GAOX - General American Transportation Corporation
- GAPX - Georgia-Pacific Corporation (Plaquemine Division), Georgia Gulf Corporation
- GARX - General American Transportation Corporation, GATX de Mexico, SA de CV
- GASC - Georgia, Ashburn, Sylvester & Camilla Railroad
- GASX - General American Marks Company
- GATU - Gateway Container Leasing
- GATX - General American Marks Company, GATX Corporation
- GAUX - General American Transportation Corporation
- GAYX - General American Transportation Corporation
- GBRX - Greenbrier Leasing Corporation
- GBRY - Gettysburg Railway
- GBRZ - Greenbrier Leasing Corporation
- GBW - Green Bay and Western Railroad; Fox Valley and Western Railroad; Wisconsin Central Railway; Canadian National Railway
- GBWX - Gerber Products Company; Sandoz; Novartis
- GC - Georgia Central Railway
- GCAU - GCA Transport
- GCCX - General American Marks Company
- GCDU - Overseas Container
- GCEU - Genstar Container Corporation
- GCEZ - Genstar Container Corporation
- GCFX - Alstom Canada Transport
- GCGX - Gulf Coast Grain
- GCIX - Gabriel Chemicals
- GCLX - Gold Coast Limited
- GCLZ - Global Chassis Leasing
- GCMX - National Railway Historical Society (Gold Coast Chapter)
- GCOX - Gold Coast Railroad Museum
- GCPU - Genstar (Burlington Northern and Santa Fe Railway; BNSF Railway)
- GCPX - Georgia Gulf Corporation (PVC Division)
- GCRX - Grand Canyon Railway
- GCSF - Gulf, Colorado and Santa Fe Railway
- GCSR - Gulf, Colorado and San Saba Railway
- GCSU - G.C.S. Containers Service, SA
- GCTU - Gulf Container Lines
- GCTX - General Chemical Corporation
- GCW - Garden City Western Railway
- GCX - Alltank Equipment Corporation, Honeywell
- GDCX - General American Marks Company
- GDJX - Grimmel Industries
- GDLK - Grand Elk Railroad
- GEAX - Trinity Rail Management
- GECX - GE Transportation
- GECZ - GE Capital Container Finance Corporation
- GEGX - GE Gas Turbine
- GELX - Garvey Elevators, Grain Marketing
- GEMX - GE Rail Services
- GENX - GE Rail Services
- GEOX - GEO Specialty Chemicals
- GEPX - Trinity Rail Management
- GETX - Getty Refining and Marketing Company, General American Marks Company
- GETY - Gettysburg Railroad (1976-1996)
- GETZ - Transport International Pool
- GEX - General Electric Company
- GEXR - Goderich-Exeter Railway (RailAmerica)
- GF - Central of Georgia Railroad, Norfolk Southern
- GFAX - Gordon Fay Associates
- GFC - Grand Falls Central Railway
- GFCX - Glens Falls Lehigh Cement Company
- GFCZ - General Foods Corporation
- GFHX - Commercial Credit Capital Corporation
- GFJX - Garret Railroad Car & Equipment
- GFLX - Greenfield Logistics
- GFR - Grand Forks Railway
- GFRR - Georgia & Florida Railroad
- GFSX - General American Marks Company
- GGCX - Georgia Gulf Corporation (Plaquemine Division)
- GGIX - Garvey International (Garvey Grain Division)
- GGMX - Golden Gate Railroad Museum
- GGPX - General American Marks Company
- GGS - South Carolina Central Railroad (Georgia Great Southern Division)
- GHBX - G. Heileman Brewing Company
- GHH - Galveston, Houston and Henderson Railroad
- GHRD - Green Hills Rural Development (Chillicothe-Brunswick Rail Maintenance Authority)
- GHRX - GHR Energy Corporation
- GIEX - General American Marks Company
- GIHX - Gifford-Hill & Company (Cornerstone C & M Incorporated); Hanson
- GILX - Gilman Paper Company
- GIMX - General American Marks Company
- GITM - Golden Isles Terminal Railroad
- GJ - Greenwich and Johnsonville Railway
- GJR - Guelph Junction Railway
- GKLX - Gold Kist
- GLBZ - Trac Lease
- GLC - Great Lakes Central Railroad
- GLCU - Flex-Van Leasing
- GLCX - Great Lakes Carbon
- GLKU - Great Lakes Chemical Corporation
- GLKX - Great Lakes Chemical Corporation
- GLLX - Great Lakes Locomotive Leasing
- GLNX - GLNX Corporation
- GLRX - Georgetown Loop Railroad
- GLSR - Gloster Southern Railroad
- GLSX - Glacier State Distribution Services
- GMCX - General Motors Corporation
- GMDX - General Motors Diesel Canada
- GMGX - M and G Polymers USA
- GMHX - General American Marks Company
- GMTX - General American Marks Company
- GMIX - Chicago Freight Car Leasing Company
- GMO - Gulf, Mobile and Ohio Railroad, Illinois Central Gulf Railroad, Illinois Central, Canadian National Railway
- GMRC - Green Mountain Railroad
- GMRY - Great Miami and Scioto Railway
- GMSR - Kansas City Southern Railway
- GN - Great Northern Railway, Burlington Northern Railroad, Burlington Northern and Santa Fe Railway; BNSF Railway
- GNA - Graysonia, Nashville and Ashdown Railroad, Kansas City Southern Railway
- GNAX - Holnam
- GNBC - Grainbelt Corporation, Farmrail
- GNCU - Gallatin National Company
- GNFX - Gainesville, Florida (City of)
- GNLX - Georgia Industrial Leasing Company
- GNRR - Georgia Northeastern Railroad
- GNTX - Railgon Company, TTX Corporation
- GNWR - Genesee and Wyoming Railroad
- GOCU - Greenfield Overseas Container
- GOCX - Gulf Oil Products Company, Chevron Phillips Chemical Company
- GOHX - General American Marks Company
- GONX - Railgon Company, TTX Corporation
- GOT - Greater Toronto Transit Authority
- GOTU - Gulf Overseas Towing
- GPBX - Georgia-Pacific Corporation
- GPCX - General Electric Company (General Purpose Control Department), Georgia-Pacific Corporation
- GPDX - General American Marks Company
- GPEX - General American Transportation Corporation
- GPFX - General American Marks Company, GATX Corporation
- GPIX - General Portland, Sunbelt Cement
- GPLU - Management Control and Maintenance
- GPLX - General American Marks Company
- GPMX - Georgia-Pacific Corporation (Mid Continent Wood Products Manufacturing Division)
- GPPX - Georgia-Pacific Corporation (Portland Division)
- GPSX - Georgia-Pacific Corporation (Eastern Wood Products Manufacturing Division)
- GPUX - GPU Service Corporation
- GR - Grand Rapids Eastern Railroad
- GRCX - Granite Rock Company (Graniterock)
- GRDX - Grand River Dam Authority
- GREX - Georgetown Rail Equipment Company
- GRFF - Georgia and Florida Railroad
- GRIV - Gauley River Railroad
- GRLW - Greenville & Western Railway Company (Western Carolina Railway Service Corporation)
- GRMX - Gopher State Railway Museum
- GRN - Greenville and Northern Railway (retired mark, line now abandoned)
- GRNR - Grand River Railway
- GRNW - Great Northwest Railroad
- GROI - Genesee Rail-One
- GROX - Growth Nonstop Cooperative, First Union Rail
- GRPX - General Chemical, CIT Financial
- GRR - Georgetown Railroad
- GRRX - Wampum Hardware
- GRRY - Grand River Railway
- GRSX - Gunderson Rail Services
- GRTX - Savage-Tolk Energy Services
- GRWR - Great Walton Railroad
- GRYR - Grenada Railway
- GRYX - John H. Grace Company, Transmatrix
- GSAX - Granite State Concrete Company
- GSCU - Eurotainer US
- GSCX - Greenville Leasing Company, General American Marks Company
- GSF - Georgia Southern and Florida Railway
- GSI - Gulf and Ship Island Railroad
- GSIX - Gas Supply, Williams Energy Ventures
- GSLX - George R Silcott Railway Equipment
- GSM - Great Smoky Mountains Railroad
- GSNX - Gulf States Utilities Company, Helm Financial Corporation
- GSOR - Indiana Hi-Rail Corporation
- GSPX - Great Southern Plywood Company
- GSRX - Golden Spike Railroad Services
- GSSX - Gopher State Scrap and Metal
- GSTU - Genstar Container Corporation
- GSUX - Girl Scouts USA
- GSW - Great Southwest Railroad
- GSWR - South Carolina Central Railroad (Georgia Southwestern Division)
- GSWX - G and S Company
- GT - Grand Trunk Railway
- GTA - Grand Trunk Western, Canadian National Railway
- GTAX - Harvest States Cooperative
- GTC - Gulf Transport
- GTEU - General Transport Equipment Company
- GTER - Grafton Terminal Railroad
- GTIS - Guilford Transportation Industries
- GTIZ - G. T. Intermodal USA
- GTLZ - G. T. Leasing
- GTP - Grand Trunk Pacific Railway (expired)
- GTPR - Grand Trunk Pacific Railway
- GTPZ - TIT Services
- GTR - Great River Railroad (Rosedale-Bolivar County Port Commission)
- GTRA - Golden Triangle Railroad
- GTTX - Trailer Train Company, TTX Company
- GTW - Grand Trunk Western, Canadian National Railway
- GTWQ - Grand Trunk Western, Canadian National Railway
- GTZZ - GT Trucking
- GU - Grafton and Upton Railroad
- GUAX - Georgia Power Company
- GUEX - General American Marks Company
- GURZ - Grafton and Upton Railroad
- GVCX - Glen-Valley Corporation
- GVDX - Oxy Vinyls
- GVSR - Galveston Railroad
- GWAX - Railroad Salvage and Restoration
- GWCX - Greenway Centre
- GWER - Gateway Eastern Railway; Kansas City Southern Railway
- GWF - Galveston Wharves
- GWHX - Stevens Energy
- GWIX - GWI Leasing Corporation
- GWR - Great Western Railway of Colorado
- GWRC - Georgia Woodlands Railroad
- GWRS - Great Western Railway (Saskatchewan)
- GWSR - Great Western Railway (Saskatchewan)
- GWSW - GWI Switching Services, LP
- GWWD - Greater Winnipeg Water District
- GWWE - Gateway Eastern Railway
- GWAG - Greenwood And Grizzly RailRoad
- GWWR - Gateway Western Railway
- GYLX - Gaylord Container Corporation
