= List of reporting marks: B =

Note: Marks ending in U are for container owners; marks ending in X are not common carriers; marks ending in Z are for trailers without flanged wheels. All other marks are of common-carrier railroads.

== B ==
- BA - Boston and Albany Railroad; New York Central Railroad; Penn Central; Conrail
- BADX - Baden Investment Company
- BAEX - Farmers Elevator Company of Bondurant, IA; The Andersons
- BALX - Bayer Corporation
- BANU - Bank Winter and Co Aktiengesellschaft
- BAP - Butte, Anaconda and Pacific Railway
- BAPX - Bay Area Piggyback, Inc.
- BAR - Bangor and Aroostook Railroad; Montreal, Maine and Atlantic Railway
- BARU - Barons Leasing Corporation
- BARZ - Bangor and Aroostook Railroad; Montreal, Maine and Atlantic Railway
- BASF - BASF
- BASX - Bay State Milling Company
- BAWX - Babcock & Wilcox Company
- BAYL - Bay Line Railroad
- BAYU - Mobay Chemical Corporation
- BAYX - Union Tank Car Company; Bayer Corporation
- BAZX - Bay Chemical Company, Inc.
- BB - Buckingham Branch Railroad
- BBCX - BBC Brown Boveri, Inc.; ABB Power Generation, Inc.
- BBRX - Bombardier Inc. (Transportation Equipment Group)
- BBSZ - Barbar Steamship Lines, Inc.
- BBTU - Bress Bulk International Bulk Transport and Consulting
- BCAX - Blue Circle, Inc.
- BCCX - Border Chemical Company
- BCDX - Borden Chemical (a division of Borden, Inc.)
- BCE - British Columbia Hydro and Power Authority
- BCFX - GE Railcar Services Corporation
- BCGX - Bay Cities Gas Corporation
- BCH - British Columbia Hydro and Power Authority; Southern Railway of British Columbia
- BCIT - British Columbia Railway; Canadian National Railway
- BCIU - Bay Cities Leasing Company
- BCIX - Blue Circle, Inc.
- BCJU - Bay Cities Leasing Company
- BCK - Buffalo Creek Railroad; Conrail
- BCER - British Columbia Electric Railway
- BCLR - Bay Colony Railroad; Massachusetts Coastal Railroad
- BCLU - Bibby Bros. Company
- BCMX - Bullet Concrete Materials Company
- BCNE - Canadian National Railway
- BCOL - British Columbia Railway; Canadian National
- BCPX - Brighton Corporation
- BCRR - Boyne City Railroad
- BCRX - GE Capital Rail Services
- BCRY - Barrie-Collingwood Railway
- BCTX - Boise Cascade
- BCTZ - Boise Cascade
- BCVX - West Coast Express
- BCWX - Union Tank Car Company
- BCYU - Bay Cities Leasing Company; Union Pacific
- BDCX - Anchor Glass Container
- BDLX - BDL Company
- BDMX - Blue Diamond Mining, Inc.
- BDNX - Baroid Division, NL Industries, Inc.; Baroid Drilling Fluids, Inc.
- BDRV - Belvidere and Delaware River Railway
- BDTL - Ballard Terminal Railroad
- BDW - Bighorn Divide and Wyoming Railroad
- BE - Baltimore and Eastern Railroad; Conrail
- BECX - FMC Corporation (Inorganic Chemicals Division)
- BEEM - Beech Mountain Railroad
- BEKR - Berks Rail Corporation
- BELX - Bell Processing, Inc.
- BENX - Bennett Lumber Products, Inc.; Investors Property Service
- BEPX - Coastal States Energy Company
- BFC - Bellefonte Central Railroad
- BFCF - Bremerton Freight Car Ferry
- BFCX - Berwick Freight Car Company
- BFFX - Berwick Forge and Fabrication Division Whittaker Corporation
- BFGX - B. F. Goodrich Company (Chemical Group); Oxy Vinyls, LP
- BFHU - Bailee Freight Services, Ltd.
- BFIX - Bethlehem Steel Corporation
- BFJR - Brillion and Forest Junction Railroad
- BFPX - Besse Forest Products
- BFRX - Bakery Trading Company
- BFSU - Bailee Freight Services, Ltd.
- BFTX - Bill Frank Rail Service
- BGCM - Bountiful Grain and Craig Mountain Railroad
- BGEX - General American Marks Company
- BGFX - Barnabas Group Foundation
- BGKU - Schering AG
- BGSX - Strata Corporation
- BH - Bath and Hammondsport Railroad; B and H Rail Corporation
- BHCR - Black Hills Central Railroad
- BHCU - Bridgehead Container Service
- BHP - BHP Nevada Railroad
- BHTX - Bernhart Crane and Rigging Company
- BHWY - Boot Hill and Western Railway
- BIAX - Ocala Recycling
- BICX - Beker Industries Corporation
- BIDU - Universal Bulk-Handling, Ltd.
- BIGX - Big Three Industries, Inc.; Air Liquide America Corporation
- BIRR - Bellingham International Railroad
- BISX - Brandenburg Industrial Service Company
- BITY - Penn Eastern Rail Lines, Inc.
- BJGX - BJ Gas Supply, Inc.
- BJHX - B. J. Hughes, Inc.; BJ Titan Services Company
- BJOX - Citicorp Railmark Inc. (Citirail)
- BJRY - Burlington Junction Railway
- BKLU - Bank Line Limited
- BKRR - Batten Kill Railroad
- BKRU - Baker Tanks
- BKTY - Missouri-Kansas-Texas Railroad; Union Pacific
- BLA - Baltimore and Annapolis Railroad
- BLCX - The Commonwealth Plan, Inc.
- BLE - Bessemer and Lake Erie Railroad
- BLFX - Brightline
- BLHX - SMBC Rail Services
- BLKM - Black Mesa & Lake Powell Railroad
- BLKU - Bulkhaul Company
- BLKZ - Mid-American Intermodal Equipment Corporation
- BLMR - Blue Mountain Railroad
- BLOL - Bloomer Line
- BLU - Blue Ridge Southern Railroad
- BM - Boston and Maine Railroad; Pan Am Railways
- BMAZ - Better Asset Management; Transamerica Leasing
- BMCX - Bluewater Michigan Chapter, Inc.
- BMDX - GE Railcar Services Corporation
- BMDZ - Minnesota, Dakota and Western Railway
- BMEX - Brookville Equipment Corporation
- BMH - Beaufort and Morehead Railroad
- BMIZ - Burlington Motor Carriers
- BML - Belfast and Moosehead Lake Railroad
- BMRG - Blue Mountain and Reading Railroad
- BMS - Berlin Mills Railway; St. Lawrence and Atlantic Railroad
- BMSX - Bemis Company, Inc.
- BMT - Brooklyn–Manhattan Transit
- BMZ - Boston and Maine Railroad; Pan Am Railways
- BN - Burlington Northern Railroad; Burlington Northern and Santa Fe Railway; BNSF Railway
- BNAU - Burlington Northern and Santa Fe Railway; BNSF Railway
- BNAZ - Burlington Northern and Santa Fe Railway; BNSF Railway
- BNFE - Burlington Northern Railroad; Burlington Northern and Santa Fe Railway; BNSF Railway
- BNFT - Burlington Northern Railroad; Burlington Northern and Santa Fe Railway; BNSF Railway
- BNGR - Blackwell Northern Gateway Railroad
- BNIU - British and Irish Steam Packet Company
- BNML - Burlington Northern (Manitoba), Ltd.
- BNO - Burlington Northern and Santa Fe Railway; BNSF Railway
- BNOW - Burlington Northern (Oregon-Washington), Inc.
- BNPZ - Pacific Rail Services
- BNQ - Burlington Northern Railroad; Burlington Northern and Santa Fe Railway; BNSF Railway End Of Train Devices
- BNRQ - Burlington Northern and Santa Fe Railway; BNSF Railway
- BNRZ - Burlington Northern and Santa Fe Railway; BNSF Railway
- BNSF - Burlington Northern and Santa Fe Railway; BNSF Railway
- BNXU - Burlington Northern and Santa Fe Railway; BNSF Railway
- BNZ - Burlington Northern and Santa Fe Railway; BNSF Railway
- BO - Baltimore and Ohio Railroad; Chessie System; CSX Transportation
- BOBX - Freeman Gas of N.C., Inc.
- BOCT - Baltimore and Ohio Chicago Terminal Railroad; CSX Transportation
- BOCX - BOC Gases
- BOCY - Boat Company
- BOGU - BSL Transport
- BOMX - Baltimore and Ohio Railroad Museum
- BONU - Bond International, Ltd.
- BOP - Border Pacific Railroad
- BORX - US Borax, Inc.
- BORZ - Ecorail, Inc.
- BOSU - W. BOS Vloeistof Transport, B.V.
- BOZ - CSX Transportation
- BPAX - United States Department of Energy (Bonneville Power Administration)
- BPAZ - Acme Markets, Inc.
- BPCU - BP Chemicals Belgium
- BPCX - Basin Electric Power Cooperative
- BPIX - Nova Chemicals, Inc.
- BPLU - M1 Engineering, Ltd.
- BPLX - Nova Chemicals, Inc.
- BPOX - BP Amoco Chemical Company (BP Oil Division)
- BPPX - Brewster Phosphates of Bradley, Florida; General American Marks Company
- BPRC - Bergen Passaic Railway Corporation
- BPRR - Buffalo and Pittsburgh Railroad
- BPRX - Bergen Passaic Railway Corporation
- BPTR - Bergen Passaic Terminal Railroad
- BR - Bradford Industrial Rail
- BRAN - Brandon Corporation
- BRAX - Brae Corporation; CIT Group
- BRBX - Bombardier Transportation
- BRC - Belt Railway of Chicago
- BRCX - Bunge North America, Inc.
- BRCY - Cando Contracting, Ltd.
- BRE - Burlington Northern Railroad
- BREX - Big Rivers Electric Corporation
- BRG - Brownsville and Rio Grande International Railroad
- BRGX - Bridger Rail Shipping, LLC
- BRIX - Incobrasa Industries; Union Tank Car Company
- BRKX - Burke Energy Corporation
- BRLX - BRS Leasing Company
- BRNU - Brun, SA
- BRNZ - Comtrak
- BROU - Swedish Transocean Lines
- BRR - Battle River Railroad (formerly used by Belton Railroad)
- BRRC - Borinstein Railroad
- BRRX - Brooklyn Resource Recovery, Inc.
- BRSR - Blue Ridge Scenic Railway
- BRW - Black River and Western
- BS - Birmingham Southern Railroad
- BSAX - Scouting America
- BSCX - Bethlehem Steel Corporation
- BSDA - BSDA Railroad
- BSIX - Bethlehem Steel Corporation
- BSLU - Blue Star Line, Ltd.
- BSMX - Bay State Milling Company
- BSOR - Buffalo Southern Railroad
- BSPX - Otter Tail Power Company
- BSR - Big Spring Rail
- BSRR - Branford Steam Railroad
- BSRX - Branson Scenic Railway
- BST - Bi-State Transit; MetroLink
- BSTX - Trinitas Corporation
- BSVY - Boone and Scenic Valley Railroad
- BTAX - Big Three Lincoln-Alaska, Inc.; Air Liquide America Corporation
- BTC - Birmingham Terminal
- BTCO - Boston Terminal Company
- BTCU - Bulkmatic Transport Company
- BTCZ - Bulkmatic Transport Company
- BTEX - BTE Equipment
- BTLZ - Intermodal Services, Inc.
- BTR - Boundary Trail Railway Company
- BTRX - Rocky Mountain Transportation Services
- BTTX - Trailer Train Company; TTX Corporation
- BUDX - Budd Company
- BUDZ - Bud Antle
- BUGX - Bruggere and Monson
- BUKX - Louisville Gas and Electric Company
- BUNX - The Buncher Company
- BUNZ - Burnside International Trucks
- BVCX - West Coast Express
- BVHX - BV Heddrick Gravel and Sand Company
- BVRY - Brandywine Valley Railroad
- BVS - Bevier and Southern Railroad
- BWC - Berwind Corporation; Pennsylvania Railroad; Penn Central; Conrail
- BWCX - Borg-Warner Chemicals; GE Plastics
- BXBX - BXB Corporation
- BXN - Bauxite and Northern Railway
- BYCX - Battle Ground Yacolt and Chelatchie Prairie Railroad
