= General American (disambiguation) =

General American or General American English is a group of accents used by a majority of Americans.

General American may also refer to:

- General American Investors Company
- General American Marks Company
- General American Transportation Corporation, now GATX
- General American Life Insurance Company, a subsidiary of MetLife
- General American Oil Company, a subsidiary of Phillips Petroleum Company
