= GCX =

GCX or Gcx can refer to:

- Global Cloud Xchange, a networking company from 2014 to 2022
- Gaochang District, a district in Turpan, Xinjiang Uyghur Autonomous Region, China; see List of administrative divisions of Xinjiang
- Global Challenges Index, which the company Aurubis is listed in
- Gorceixite, a mineral; see List of mineral symbols
- Ghana Commodity Exchange, an agricultural commodity exchange based in Accra, Ghana; see List of commodities exchanges
- Alltank Equipment Corporation, a company whose reporting mark on rail networks is "GCX"; see List of reporting marks: G
