= List of reporting marks: X =

Note: Marks ending in U are for container owners; marks ending in X are not common carriers; marks ending in Z are for trailers without flanged wheels. All other marks are of common-carrier railroads.

== X ==
- XCLX - Xcel Energy
- XCWZ - Union Pacific Railroad
- XFEZ - Florida East Coast Railway
- XNWZ - Norfolk Southern Railway
- XOMX - Exxon-Mobil Corporation
- XRFZ - CSX Transportation
- XSCZ - CSX Transportation
- XSLZ - Soo Line Railroad
- XTRX - XTRA, Inc.; First Union Rail
- XTTX - Trailer Train Company
