= Grex =

Grex or GREX may refer to:

- Grex (biology), a multicellular aggregate of amoeba of the phyla Acrasiomycota or Dictyosteliomycota
- Grex (horticulture), (pl. greges) a kind of group used in horticultural nomenclature applied to the progeny of an artificial cross from specified parents
- Formerly used to mean species aggregate
- Georgetown Rail Equipment Company, a provider of railway maintenance equipment and related services based in Georgetown, Texas
