= Edgecliff (Winnetka, Illinois) =

Coordinates: 42.1173°N 87.7340°W

Edgecliff (aka the Max Epstein House) is a Samuel Abraham Marx–designed estate in Winnetka, Illinois, in the wealthiest region of Chicago's prestigious North Shore suburbs. It is notable for once having the highest residential property taxes in Cook County, Illinois.

== History ==
Edgecliff was commissioned by Max Epstein when he became chairman of General American Transportation Company in 1929. The building was completed in 1930 by Samuel Abraham Marx.

Nathan Cummings, whose business became Consolidated Foods Corporation and then Sara Lee Corporation, purchased the building in 1954 from Epstein's estate. He, his daughter and son-in-law lived there until 1961 when Cummings relocated to New York after remarrying. His son-in-law, Robert Mayer, acquired the house in 1961 and added a 10,000-square-foot (929 m^{2}) art gallery along the south end of the estate. The property had several galleries when it was owned by Buddy and Robert B. Mayer. Terry McKay acquired the property in 1995 for $4.6 million. By 1996, he had removed the art gallery.

== Description ==
The 4-1/5 acre (1.7 hectare) property contains the two-story main complex, which is fronted by matching gatehouses, a long driveway and forecourt, is described as inspired by the 17th- and 18th-century French manor houses of Normandy and the Loire Valleys. The main building is flanked by one-story Mansard roofed wings that are attached to the north and south ends of the main building; the property also includes gardens, a pool, gazebo, and several service buildings. The building has minimal exterior decoration and the interior is marked by French doors.

Located at 915 Sheridan Road and sometimes referred to as the Max Epstein House, it was the eighth property designated as a Landmark by the Winnetka Landmark Preservation Commission. In 2014, eight of the ten highest property taxed residences in Cook County were in the North Shore villages of Winnetka and Glencoe. With a 2014 valuation of $12.2 million, Edgecliff had a property tax of $294,001.88, making it the highest taxed residential property in Cook County. When Edgecliff repeated atop the Cook County property tax roll for 2015 with a bill of $300,439, it was one of five residences on Sheridan Road in Winnetka that made the top ten.
