= Gateway Eastern Railway =

Overview
- Headquarters: Fairview Heights, Illinois
- Reporting mark: GWWE, GWER
- Locale: Illinois, Arkansas, Oklahoma
- Dates of operation: January 1994–

Technical
- Track gauge: 4 ft 8 1/2 in (1,435 mm) standard gauge

The Gateway Eastern Railway (reporting mark GWWE) was a railroad subsidiary of the Kansas City Southern Railway (KCS) (later the CPKC Railway), owning a 17-mile (27 km) main line between East Alton and East St. Louis, Illinois, United States. Originally created in 1994 as a subsidiary of the Gateway Western Railway, which acquired the East St. Louis-Kansas City line of the Chicago, Missouri and Western Railway in 1990. It was acquired by KCS along with its parent in 1997.

Separately, Gateway Eastern Railway (reporting mark GWER) owns unconnected trackage in Arkansas and Oklahoma.

== Illinois ==
The line between East St. Louis and East Alton was completed by the Belleville and Illinoistown Railroad in 1856, as an extension of its Belleville-East St. Louis (Illinoistown) line. Ownership passed to the St. Louis, Alton and Terre Haute Railroad, a predecessor of the Illinois Central Railroad, but in 1890 that company sold that segment to the Cairo, Vincennes and Chicago Railway, which became part of the Cleveland, Cincinnati, Chicago and St. Louis Railway (Big Four) and eventually the New York Central Railroad and Conrail. By 1906, the parallel Big Four and Chicago and Alton Railroad lines between Bridge Junction (East St. Louis) and Wann (near East Alton), the former just east of the latter, were being operated as a double-track line by both companies through reciprocal trackage rights.

In July 1993, the Interstate Commerce Commission approved purchase by Gateway Eastern of this line from Conrail, as well as a 1.9-mile (3.1 km) segment of the ex-Pennsylvania Railroad Main Line (Pittsburgh to St. Louis) from the Mississippi River just north of the Eads Bridge to Conrail's Rose Lake Yard at Willows. A short segment of trackage rights over the Terminal Railroad Association of St. Louis's (TRRA's) Eads Subdivision, also acquired from Conrail, connected the two lines. Gateway Eastern also had access to CSX Transportation's Cone Yard, west of Willows. Operations began January 28, 1994.

In order to connect its sections without trackage rights, Gateway Western bought a strip of land from CSX Transportation on which it planned to build the "Q Connection", crossing the TRRA north of "Q Tower". After a seven-year legal battle with the TRRA, during which Gateway Western placed the line in service in May 1995 through a temporary injunction, the courts ruled in favor of Gateway Western, then part of KCS, in 1998.

=== Operations ===
Gateway Eastern's primary business was switching ex-Conrail customers in the Alton area from Conrail's Rose Lake Yard (now CSX). It had one locomotive, a 1969 EMD GP38, and operated one scheduled train per day, five days per week. Interchange was with its parent Gateway Western, Conrail, and the Southern Pacific Transportation Company subsidiary SPCSL. The reciprocal trackage rights agreement from 1906 with the Alton continues to this day, now between Gateway Eastern and the Union Pacific Railroad (successor to SPCSL, purchaser of the ex-Alton main line).

== Arkansas and Oklahoma ==
Gateway Eastern Railway Company was registered April 25, 2007 in Arkansas for use on an unconnected branch line between Fort Smith, Arkansas and Poteau, Oklahoma. The Oklahoma State Rail Plan from September 15, 2021 indicates the line is 23 miles long, 14 of which are in Oklahoma, and that GWER both owns and operates the line. GWER has no trackage that is leased or operated under contract, operated under trackage rights, or operated under haulage rights. In 2023, Canadian Pacific individually listed Gateway Eastern as one of the subsidiaries included in the new CPKC. However, CPKC for its part, and many other sources, simply show this trackage as a CPKC route, and CPKC is a lawful "fictious name" under which GWER may operate. GWER averages one train per day over the line. The Oklahoma 2026-2028 State Railroad Map continues to show this as an active line owned by GWER, branching from the CPKC line at Poteau.
