= Incobrasa Industries =

Biodiesel manufacturing firm

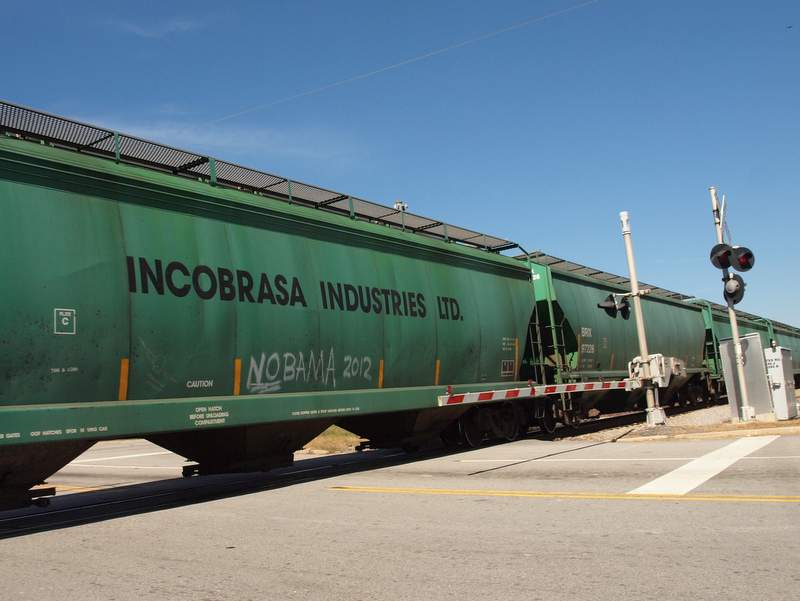
Incobrasa covered hoppers

Incobrasa Industries Limited is a biodiesel manufacturing firm in Gilman, Illinois. The firm was founded by Brazilian businessman Renato Ribeiro. Construction began in 1995 on a 2,000 ton-per-day soybean crushing facility, and the company started production in 1997. The company built on-site bottling and packaging facilities in 2004 in order to fill, label and package bottles of soybean oil for retailers. The line can fill around 24,000 bottles per hour of soybean oil, known by consumers as vegetable oil.

The company processes and distributes a variety of soybean products.

The company leases a fleet of 100 5,259 ft³ covered hopper cars to transport soybeans to the plant. The cars are leased from First Union Rail Corporation and operate under reporting marks FURX and BRIX.

== Radio service ==
Incobrasa Industries runs a radio station under call sign WNVW879, using 3 frequencies for use around the plant. A mobile relay and two mobile stations are allowed to cover a 56.0 km radius per the FCC license.
