= Georgetown Railroad =

Railroad in Texas, US

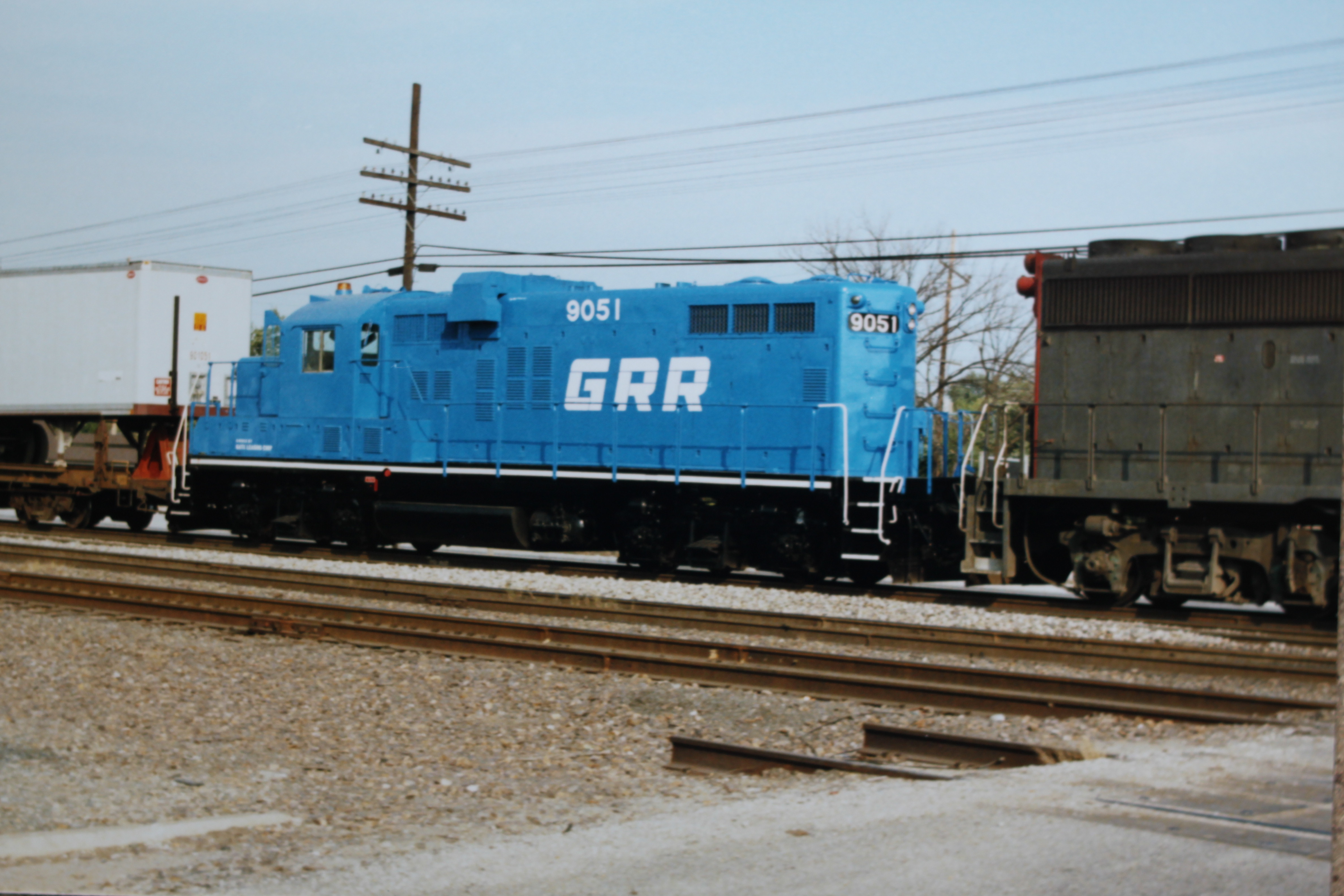
- GRR 9051, an EMD GP20, in 1989

Overview
- Headquarters: Georgetown, Texas
- Reporting mark: GRR
- Locale: Texas
- Dates of operation: 1878–present

Technical
- Track gauge: 4 ft 8 1/2 in (1,435 mm)
- Length: 30.2 miles (48.6 km)

The Georgetown Railroad (reporting mark GRR) is a class III short-line railroad headquartered in Georgetown, Texas.

== History ==
The original Georgetown Railroad Company was chartered on May 31, 1878, with a commitment to build a railroad the approximate 10-mile (16 km) distance between Georgetown and Round Rock. The first board of directors consisted of Emzy Taylor, Moses E. Steele, Thomas B. Hughes, J. H. Rucker, Duncan G. Smith, and John J. Dimmitt, all of Williamson County, and David Love. The headquarters was in Georgetown.

The first stock offering raised about $50,000, and by the end of 1878 the GRR had connected Georgetown to Round Rock. Soon, however, the railroad found itself in difficult financial straits and was sold in foreclosure on August 5, 1879. The International-Great Northern Railroad purchased the Georgetown and operations were merged with that company in 1882. The branch was operated by the I-GN and its successors until 1959, when it was sold to the new Georgetown Railroad Company.

This company was incorporated on July 25, 1958, and it acquired eight miles of the Georgetown branch of the Missouri Pacific Railroad, a successor to the I-GN.

On June 3, 1991, the Georgetown Railroad acquired that portion of the Belton Railroad east of Interstate 35 at Belton and began operating it as its Belton Subdivision.

== Operations ==
- The "Granger Branch", a 24.3-mile (39.1 km) line from an interchange with Union Pacific at Round Rock through Georgetown to an interchange with Union Pacific at Granger, Texas. (The line was previously owned by the Missouri Pacific and Missouri-Kansas-Texas.)
- The "Belton Branch", a 5.9-mile (9.5 km) line from Belton, Texas to an interchange with Union Pacific at Smith, Texas. (The line was previously owned by Missouri-Kansas-Texas). It has sat out of service for about a decade.

The Georgetown Railroad primarily handles unit aggregate trains for the Texas Crushed Stone Company's large quarry located west of Georgetown, but it also delivers building materials to the Builders FirstSource lumber yard in Georgetown.

== See also ==
- Georgetown Rail Equipment Company
