= Gateway Western Railway =

Defunct American railway

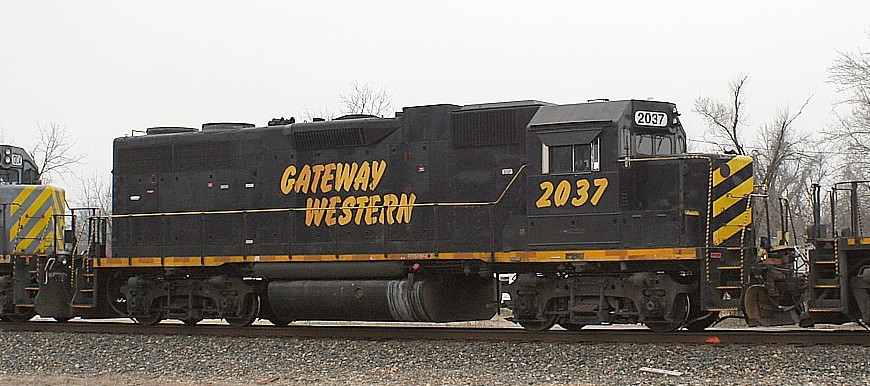
- GWWR #2037, an EMD GP38.

Overview
- Reporting mark: GWWR
- Locale: Illinois, Missouri
- Dates of operation: 1990–2001
- Predecessor: Chicago, Missouri and Western Railway
- Successor: Kansas City Southern Railway, currently Canadian Pacific Kansas City (CPKC)

Technical
- Track gauge: 4 ft 8 1/2 in (1,435 mm)
- Length: 408 miles (657 km)

The Gateway Western Railway (reporting mark GWWR) was a Class II railroad that operated 408 miles of former Chicago and Alton Railroad track between Kansas City and St. Louis, Missouri. It also operated between Kansas City, Missouri, and Springfield, Illinois on the old Alton Railroad line that eventually was the Chicago, Missouri and Western Railway.

== History ==
The Gateway Western Railway began operations on January 9, 1990, after purchasing the Kansas City to St. Louis right-of-way from the bankrupt Chicago, Missouri and Western Railway. Originally the Kansas City, St. Louis & Chicago, the line came under Chicago & Alton control in 1878, but never had much success under several operators of its line over the years, which included the Alton Railroad, Gulf, Mobile and Ohio Railroad from 1947 to 1972, and Illinois Central Gulf Railroad from 1972 to 1987. On April 28, 1987, Illinois Central Gulf, divesting itself of surplus lines to get itself down to a core system, sold the Kansas City line, and the Chicago (actually with ownership ending at Joliet, Illinois, then with trackage rights from there to Chicago via the Illinois Central Railroad) to East St. Louis mainline, to a new 633 mile regional, Chicago, Missouri and Western Railway.

In 1989, the Chicago, Missouri and Western Railway entered bankruptcy. The Atchison, Topeka and Santa Fe Railway (ATSF) had always wanted an access to St. Louis. Seeing an opportunity, Santa Fe arranged for a New York investment firm to purchase the Chicago, Missouri and Western Railway's Kansas City to St. Louis line, thus creating the Gateway Western Railway. Santa Fe routed quite a bit of intermodal traffic via this routing during this period. However, by 1995, the Burlington Northern Railroad (BN) and the Santa Fe merged to form the Burlington Northern and Santa Fe Railway. With the BN already owning a St. Louis line via a couple of routes already, less and less ATSF traffic was routed this way.

In 1997, the GWWR and its Illinois subsidiary Gateway Eastern Railway were purchased by Kansas City Southern (KCS). The KCS operated the GWWR as a subsidiary until October 1, 2001, when it transferred its controlling interest to its own parent company and officially merged the GWWR into the KCS. The Gateway Eastern, however, remained a KCS subsidiary. After the KCS was merged into Canadian Pacific Kansas City, the ownership GWWE from the KCS fell into the new company.

In 2022, during the hearings before the STB for the CP-KCS merger, Canadian National Railway (CNR), which had lost the battle against CP for the acquisition of KCS, presented a plan to acquire the GWWR line and thus create both via Springfield and via St. Louis, a new corridor between Kansas City and St. Louis with Michigan and Eastern Canada, bypassing Chicago, and which, according to the plan presented by CN, would divert 80,000 long-haul truck shipments to rail annually. A few months later, CN resigned its intentions to purchase the Springfield Line in order to try to obtain trackage rights on the line, always with the same intention of creating the corridor proposed in the original plan to purchase the line filed with the STB. Both the initial plan to purchase the line and the subsequent plan to acquire trackage rights included the execution of corridor improvement works, valued at more than US$250 million. The STB would ultimately reject plans submitted by CN to operate on the Springfield Line.
