= Bluewater Michigan Chapter NRHS =

Chapter of National Railroad Historical Society

The Bluewater Michigan Chapter of the National Railroad Historical Society, colloquially called Bluewater, was a 501(c)(3) non-profit organization which offered events/trips involving historical railroads. Bluewater NRHS ceased to operate at the end December 2019.

== History ==
=== Early years ===
Bluewater Michigan Chapter was originally intended to exist in the Port Huron, Michigan area and thus named "Bluewater." Shortly after, however, it leased the former SEMTA Commuter Rail maintenance facility in Pontiac, Michigan, adjacent to the large Grand Trunk Western yards.

Bluewater focused on railway excursions around and beyond the state of Michigan, usually hauled by the host railroad's locomotives. They also loaned their coach fleet out to other excursion operators. An example of a Bluewater excursion would be from Detroit to Fort Wayne, Indiana on July 28 and 29, 1984, where the Norfolk and Western 611 steam locomotive hauled 24 cars including Bluewater coaches.

Many Bluewater members stored and maintained their privately owned coaches at Bluewater's yard locations. This proved to be a symbiotic relationship, as Bluewater was able to use these coaches in their excursions, allowing passenger trains longer than 20 cars.

In Owosso, Michigan, Project 1225 had restored the steam locomotive Pere Marquette 1225 and allied with Bluewater to run excursion trains in 1988.

=== Saginaw relocation ===
Bluewater lost the lease to the SEMTA rail facility, and a search for a new location led them to the former Pere Marquette roundhouse/locomotive shops in Saginaw, Michigan which they lease from the Lake State Railway. However, the lease was cancelled in 2009 and the Bluewater shops have moved to another facility in the Saginaw area. This lease was also lost, which resulted in selling all of the rail car fleet (both freight and passenger cars).

=== Modern day ===
Bluewater operated occasional trips around Michigan into the late 2000s (decade). They also held a monthly membership meeting in Royal Oak, Michigan. Bluewater NRHS ceased to operate at the end December 2019.
