= Chicago, Missouri and Western Railway =

Railroad in the midwestern United States

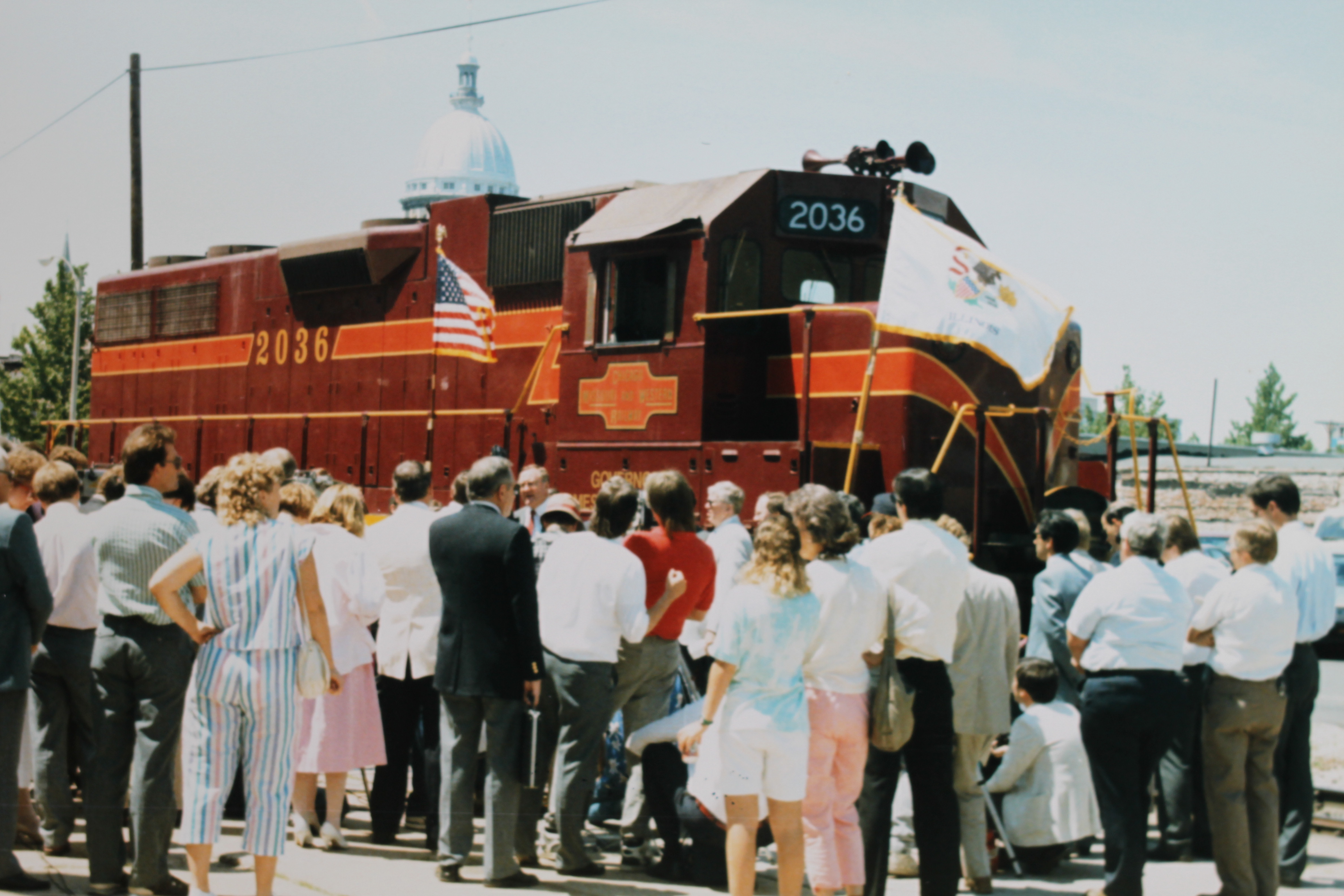
- Illinois Governor James R. Thompson dedicates one of CMNW's EMD GP38 diesel locomotives in 1988

Overview
- Reporting mark: CMNW
- Locale: Illinois, Missouri
- Dates of operation: 1987–1989
- Predecessor: Chessie System, Illinois Central Gulf
- Successor: Gateway Western Railway, SPCSL Corporation

Technical
- Track gauge: 4 ft 8 1/2 in (1,435 mm) standard gauge

The Chicago, Missouri and Western Railway (CM&W; reporting mark CMNW) was a Class II railroad that operated in the midwest of the United States between 1987 and 1989. Never financially stable, less than a year after it was created it was bankrupt and sold off its lines piecemeal to other railroads in 1989.

== History ==
The Chicago and Alton Railroad (C&A) had built and operated lines from Chicago, Illinois to Springfield, Illinois, from Springfield to Roodhouse, Illinois and St. Louis, Missouri, and from Roodhouse to Kansas City, Missouri and St. Louis, until that railroad was merged into the Gulf, Mobile and Ohio Railroad (GM&O (reporting mark GMO)) in 1947. The GM&O itself was merged into the Illinois Central Gulf Railroad (ICG) in 1972. When the ICG began spinning off its redundant lines, the Chicago, Missouri and Western Railway (CM&W (reporting mark CMNW)) purchased the lines from the ICG on April 28, 1987. The line struggled financially, leading to deferred maintenance on the track, and the company was bankrupt within the year.

== Parent company ==
Venango River was formed by former Atchison, Topeka, and Santa Fe managers to purchase the legendary South Shore Line from the Chessie System. The South Shore acquisition met with modest success, but whether the success correlated with management skill is still up for debate. The Chessie had all but neglected the railroad, making success easy to come by. Further, the Chessie equipped the South Shore with ten new locomotives ideal for shortline railroading, leading to low maintenance costs. Flush with success, Venango River purchased the CM&W from ICG with the South Shore as guarantor of the loans at Citibank. President John Darling had grand dreams of serving three steel mills belonging to National Steel, one in Detroit, one in Burns Harbor (on Chicago South Shore), and one near St. Louis (on CM&W).

== Failure ==
Collective insight suggests Venango River overpaid for the railroad, and could not service the debt with revenues. While South Shore revenues were directed toward servicing CM&W debt for a time, when the state of Indiana failed to adequately subsidize South Shore's passenger trains, the house of cards fell. The affair was not helped by the dilapidated ex-Western Pacific EMD GP40 locomotives acquired for CM&W (only a few were repainted for CM&W). The Chicago-St. Louis line was acquired at bankruptcy sale by the Southern Pacific Transportation Company and, as a result of the UP buyout, is now part of Union Pacific. The Kansas City-St. Louis (along with Roodhouse-Springfield) line was purchased by Gateway Western Railway, eventually coming under Kansas City Southern control.

== Notable service and trackage rights ==
- Piggyback service from South Shore's Burnham Yard to St. Louis
- Amtrak's Chicago-St. Louis service
- Chicago Terminal trackage rights to connect Chicago South Shore and CM&W and other area railroad yards, including Proviso (still held by CSS)
- Run-through steel coil shipments between CM&W, CSS, and GTW (for National Steel)
- Business trains featuring bright orange CSS locomotives and business cars as well as other leased business cars
