= Georgetown Rail Equipment Company =

American railroad maintenance company

Georgetown Rail Equipment Company (GREX)
- Company type: Private
- Industry: Railroad
- Founded: Texas, United States (1993)
- Founder: Ned Snead
- Headquarters: 111 Cooperative Way, Suite 100, Georgetown, Texas
- Key people: William C. "Wiggie" Shell, President & CEO; H. Lynn Turner, VP Marketing and Sales; Nate Bachman, VP Operations; Greg Grissom, VP Engineering
- Parent: Loram Maintenance of Way (Since 2018)
- Website: http://www.georgetownrail.com

The Georgetown Rail Equipment Company (GREX) is a provider of railway maintenance equipment and related services based in Georgetown, Texas. The company was founded in 1993 and is often referred to using the abbreviation GREX, also used for its logotype.

== History ==
The Snead family founded several businesses in Georgetown, Texas, including the limestone quarry Texas Crushed Stone and a railroad. Edwin Brazelton Snead founded the quarry in the 1940s, and then the railroad with his sons Ned and Bill to haul the limestone from Georgetown to Austin. Ned Snead founded the Georgetown Rail Equipment Company in 1993.

In February 2018, Loram Maintenance of Way acquired and merged with GREX. In December 2020, GREX was rebranded and started to operate under the brand name Loram Technologies Inc.

== Namesakes ==
GREX is not related to the neighboring Georgetown Railroad nor the Georgetown line in Ontario, Canada.

== Products ==
GREX train in Colorado.

- Material handling: Dump Train, Self-Powered Slot (SPS), Slot Machine, Spoils Receiver (SRS)
- Aurora
- BallastSaver
- Rail car kits: GateSync, Solaris, HydraDump

== See also ==
- List of reporting marks: G
