= GATX =

Equipment finance company

GATX Corporation

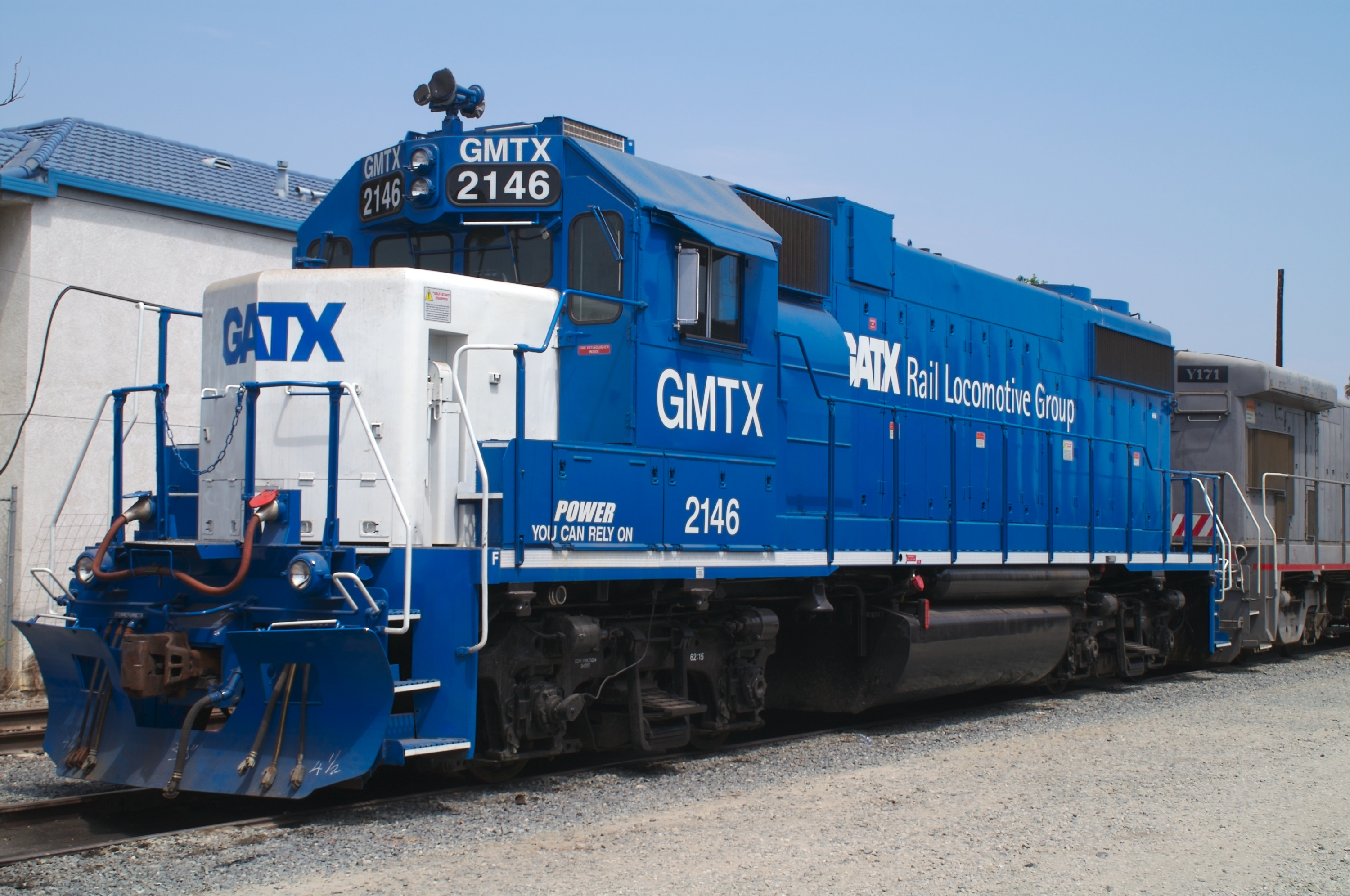
- A GATX EMD GP38-2 locomotive
- Type: Public company
- Traded as: NYSE: GATX; S&P 400 component
- Industry: Railcar leasing
- Founded: 1898; 128 years ago
- Founder: Max Epstein
- Headquarters: Chicago, Illinois
- Key people: Robert C. Lyons, CEO
- Revenue: ▲US$1.74 billion (2025)
- Net income: ▲US$333 million (2025)
- Total assets: ▲US$18 billion (2025)
- Total equity: ▲US$2.75 billion (2025)
- Number of employees: 1,904 (2020)
- Website: www.gatx.com

GATX Corporation is a railcar lessor that owns fleets in North America, Europe, and Asia. In addition, jointly with Rolls-Royce Limited, it owns one of the largest aircraft spare engine lease portfolios. It is headquartered in Chicago, Illinois. As of December 31, 2020, the company owned 148,939 rail cars, including 83,959 tank cars, 64,980 freight cars, and 645 locomotives. Other major car types owned include covered hoppers, open-top hopper cars, and gondolas. It primarily serves the petroleum industry (29% of 2020 revenues), chemical industry (22% of 2020 revenues), food industry (11% of 2020 revenues), mining industry (10% of 2020 revenues), and transportation industry (20% of 2020 revenues).

== History ==
The company was founded as Atlantic Seaboard Dispatch in Chicago, Illinois, in 1898 by Max Epstein to ship beer in refrigerated railcars for Duquesne Brewing Company.

In 1902, the company was renamed German-American Car Co. In 1916, it changed its name to General American Tank Car Corp. and became a public company via an initial public offering, and in 1933, it was renamed General American Transportation Corp.

In 1949, the company worked with designer Russel Wright to develop "Meladur", a melamine dinnerware.

Effective January 1, 2000, General American Transportation Corporation was renamed GATX Rail Corporation, a unit of GATX Corporation.

In 2004, the company sold its technology-leasing unit to CIT Group for about $200 million in cash.

In September 2013, the company sold its 37.5% interest in AAE Ahaus Alstätter Eisenbahn Cargo AG to its partner, AAE Ahaus Alstätter Eisenbahn, for €84.5 million.

In March 2014, the company acquired the North American per diem boxcar fleet of GE Capital Rail Services, consisting of more than 18,500 boxcars.

In November 2018, the company announced an agreement to acquire up to 3,100 railcars from ECN Capital for up to $229 million.

In May 2020, the company sold American Steamship Company, its dry bulk vessel business, to Rand Logistics for $260 million.

In December 2020, the company acquired Trifleet Leasing Holding B.V., the fourth largest global tank container lessor.

In 2025, GATX partnered with Brookfield Infrastructure Partners to acquire Wells Fargo Rail's $4.4 billion railcar portfolio. The deal closed in early 2026.

== Reporting marks ==
GATX's primary freight car reporting marks are:

- GATX (for tank cars)
- GACX (for general-service freight cars)
- GGPX (for coal cars)
- GIMX (for intermodal cars)
- GPLX (for plastic pellet cars)
- GMTX and LLPX (for locomotives)
- GPFX (for pressure-differential cars)

GATX also owns other marks including CGTX, GABX, GAEX, GCCX, GFSX, GOHX, GSCX, IPSX, and TRIX including for General American Marks Company and GATX Rail. Many GATX cars carry a large "GATX" logo in the upper corner of the cars regardless of the reporting mark they carry; this logo is applied for marketing reasons and does not have any operational significance.

== Gallery ==
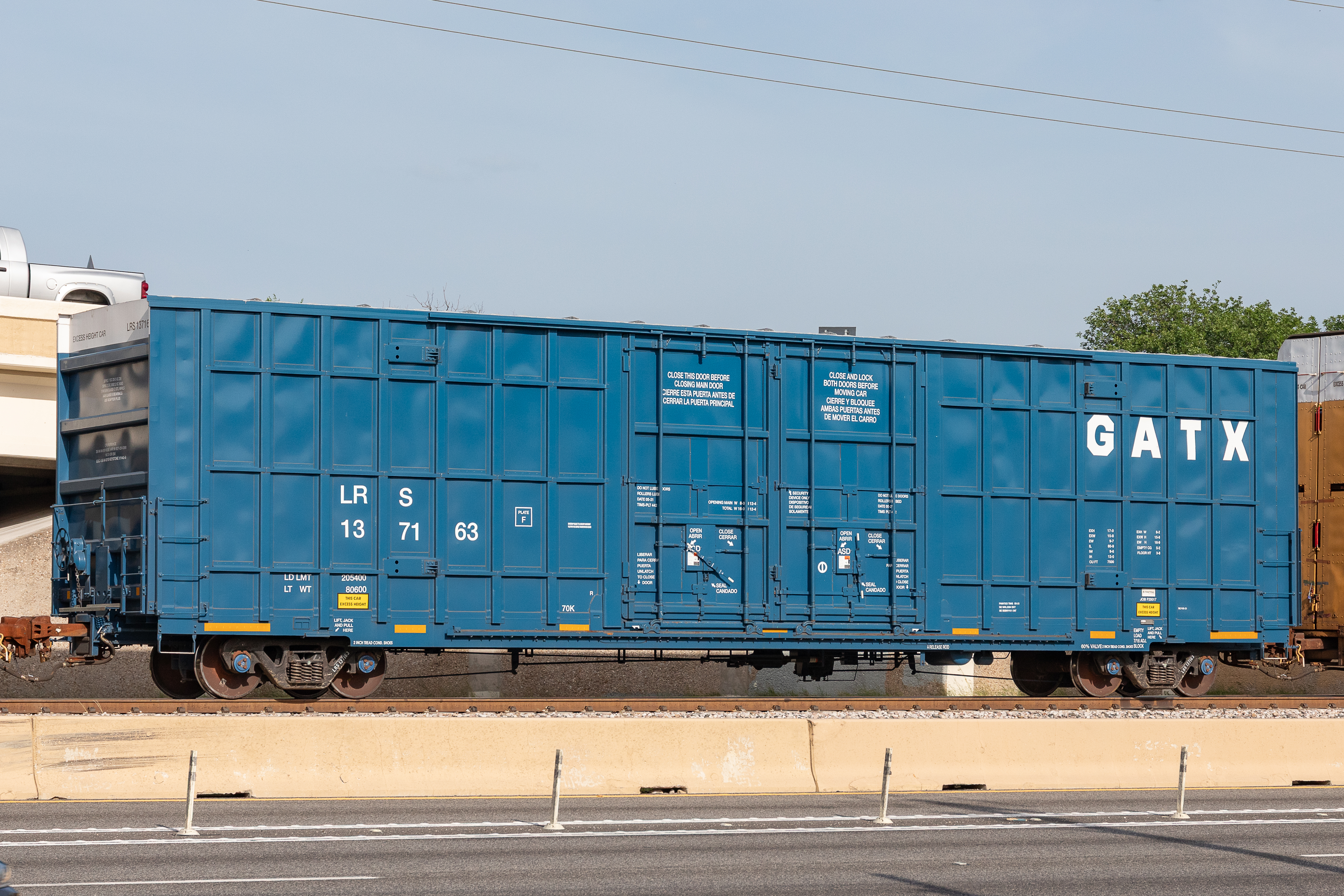
A Laurinburg & Southern boxcar wearing GATX logos.

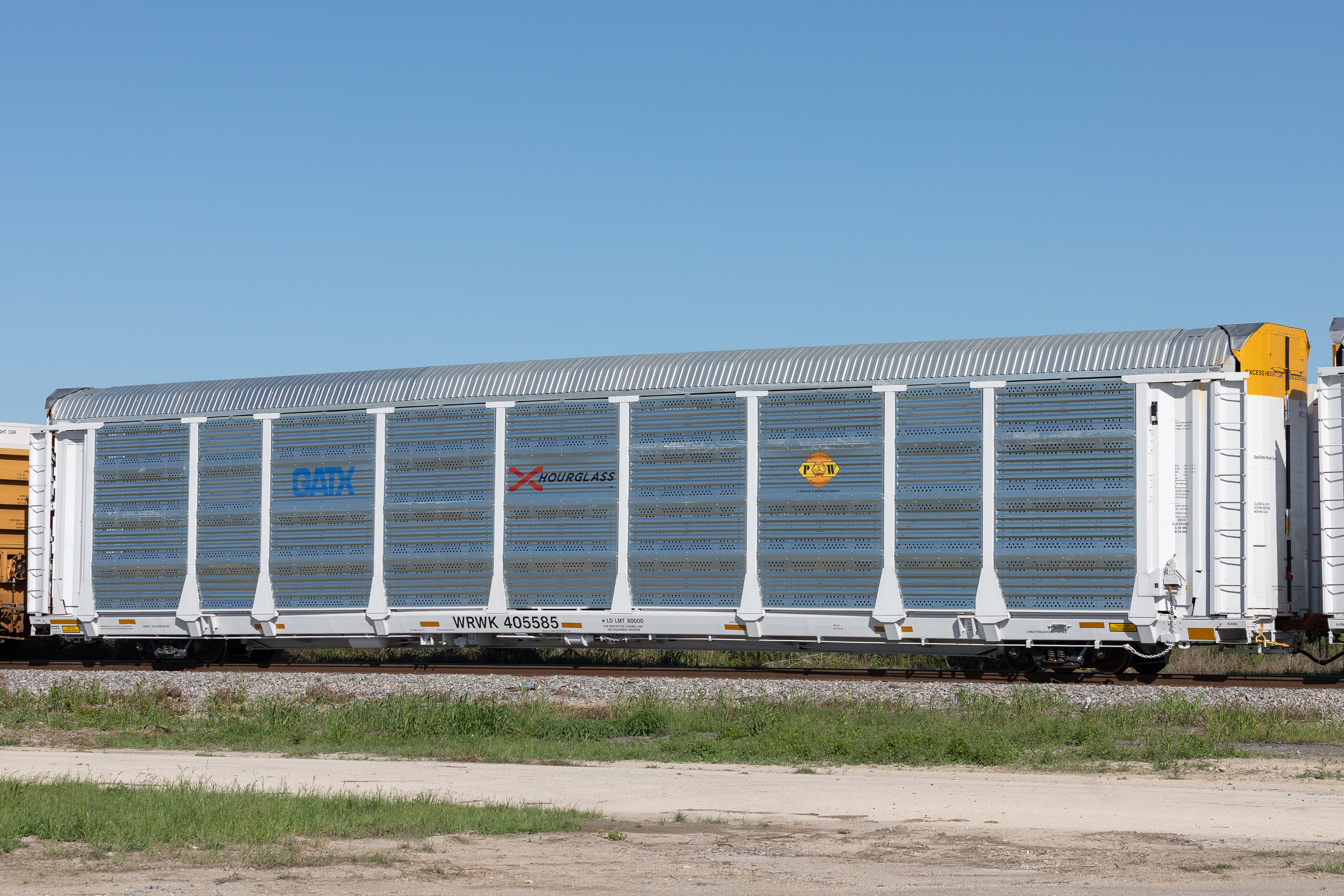
A Warwick Railway autorack wearing GATX logos.

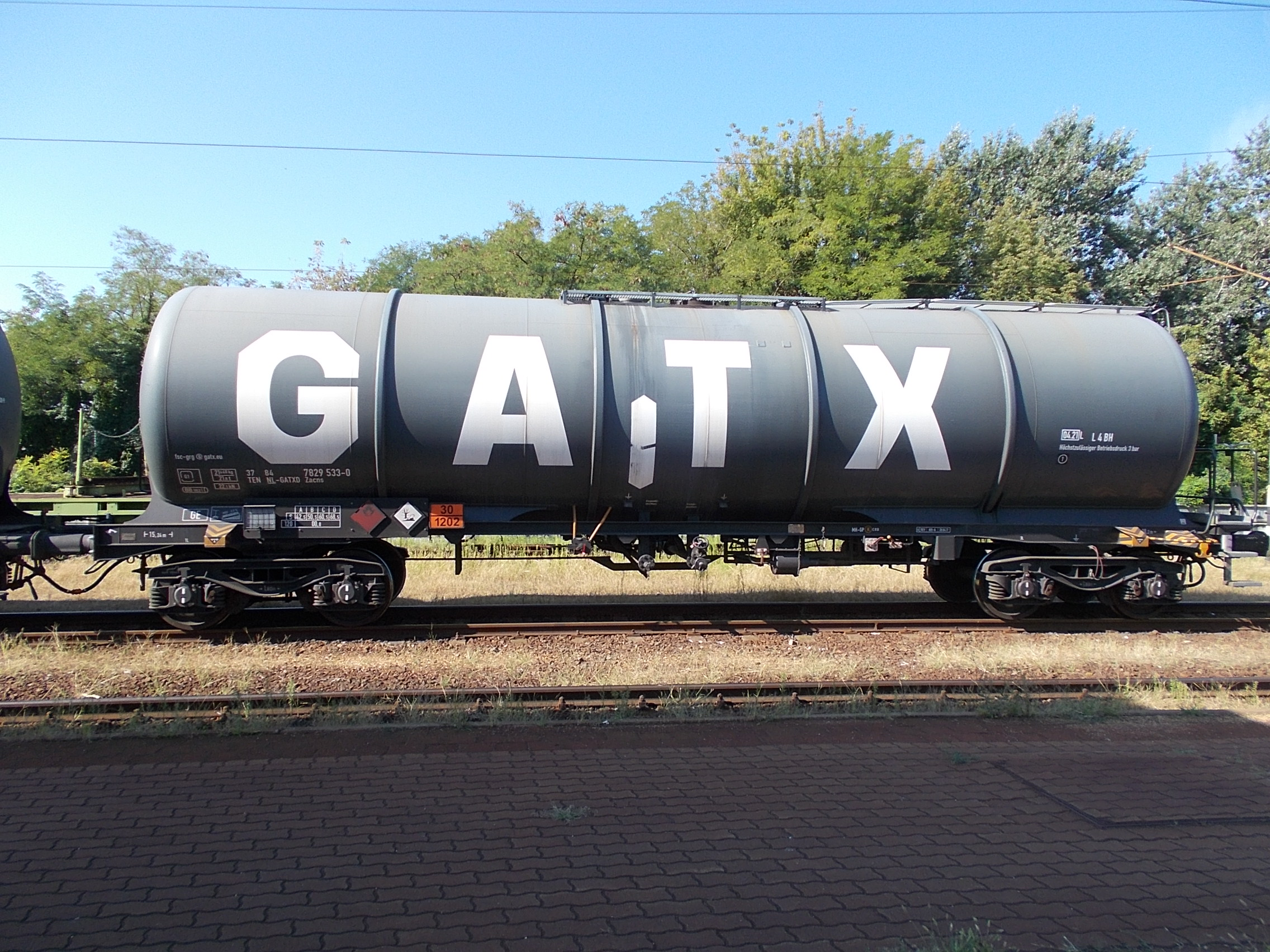
A GATX tank car in Europe

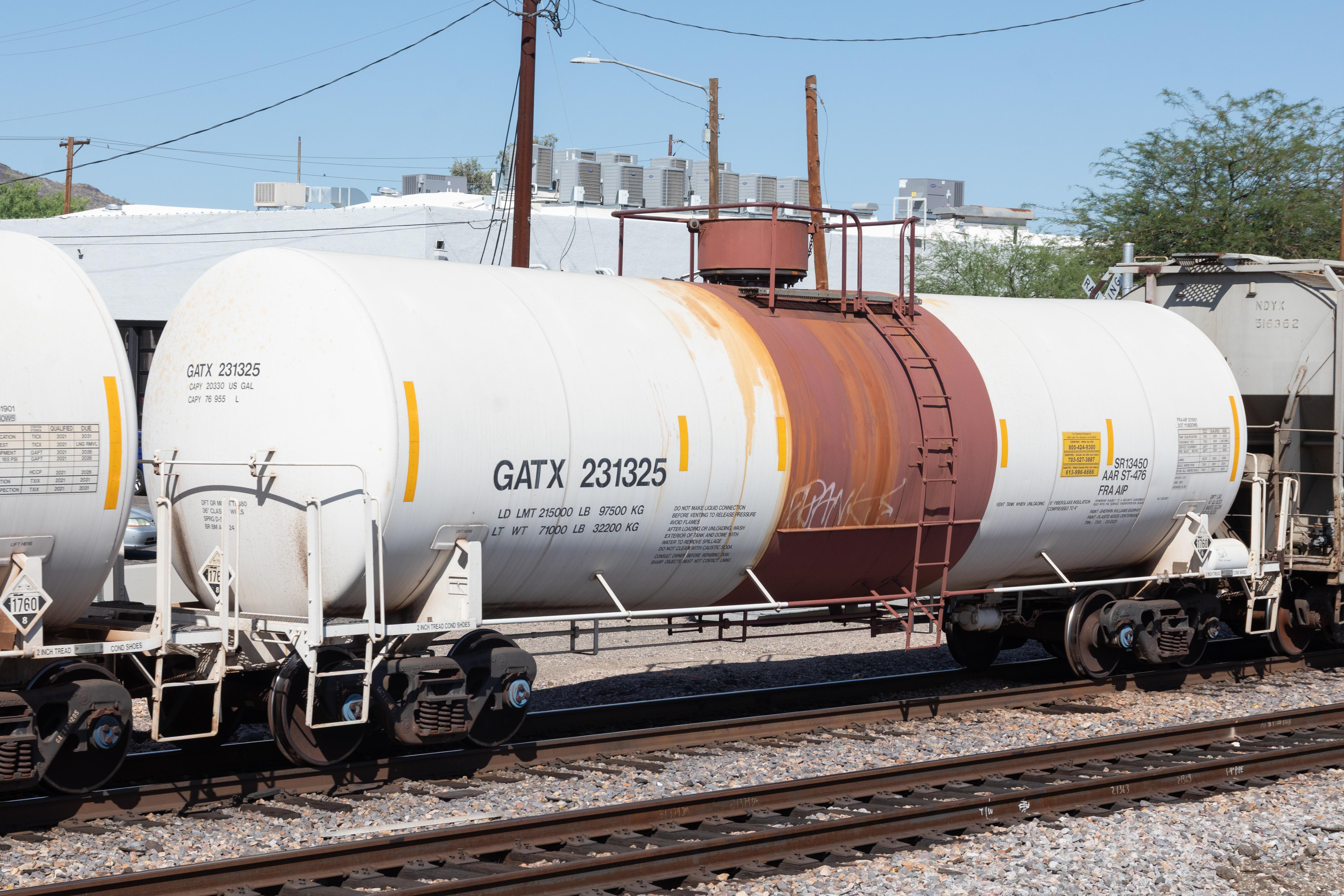
A GATX tank car in Tucson, Arizona.

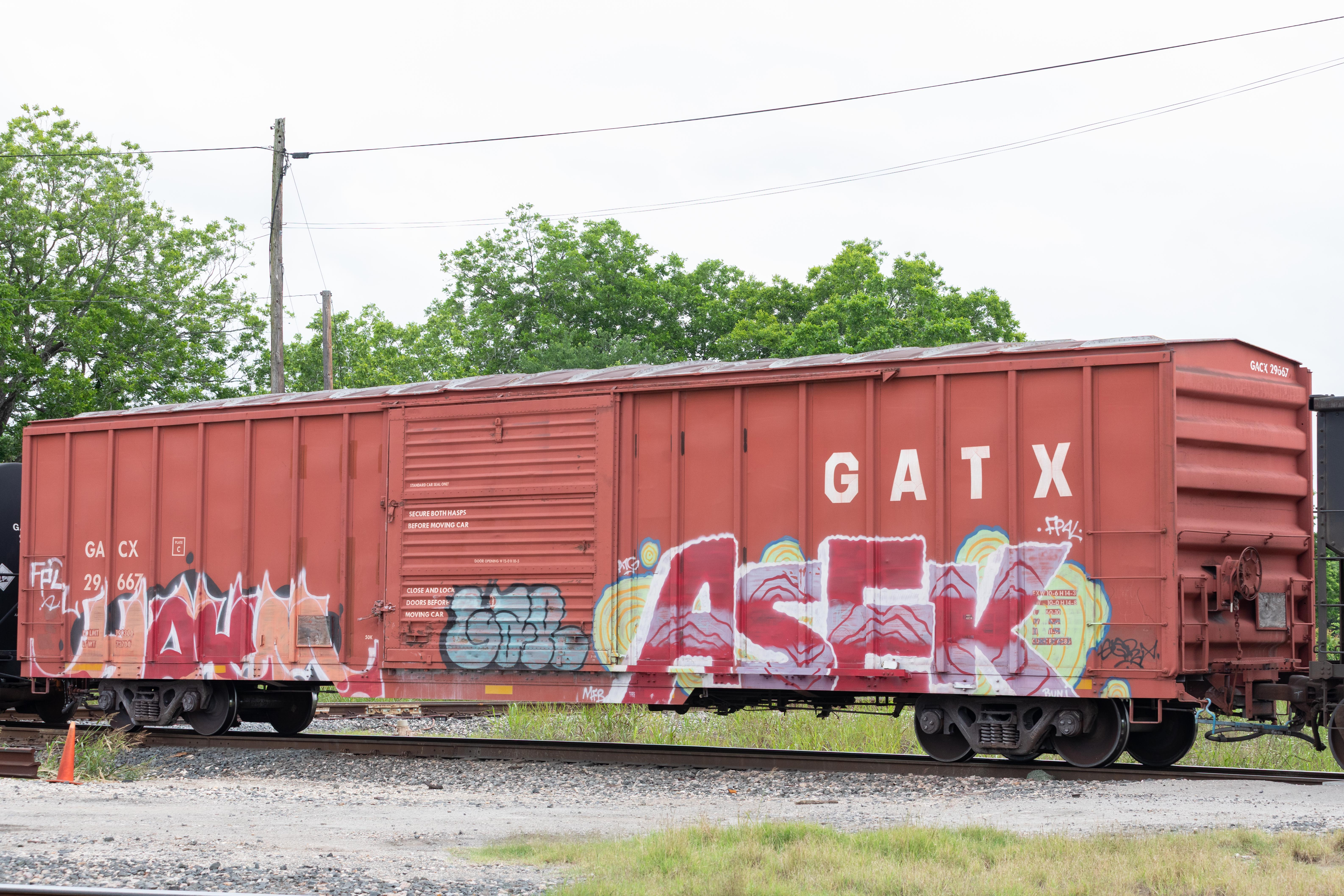
A GACX boxcar in Flatonia, Texas.

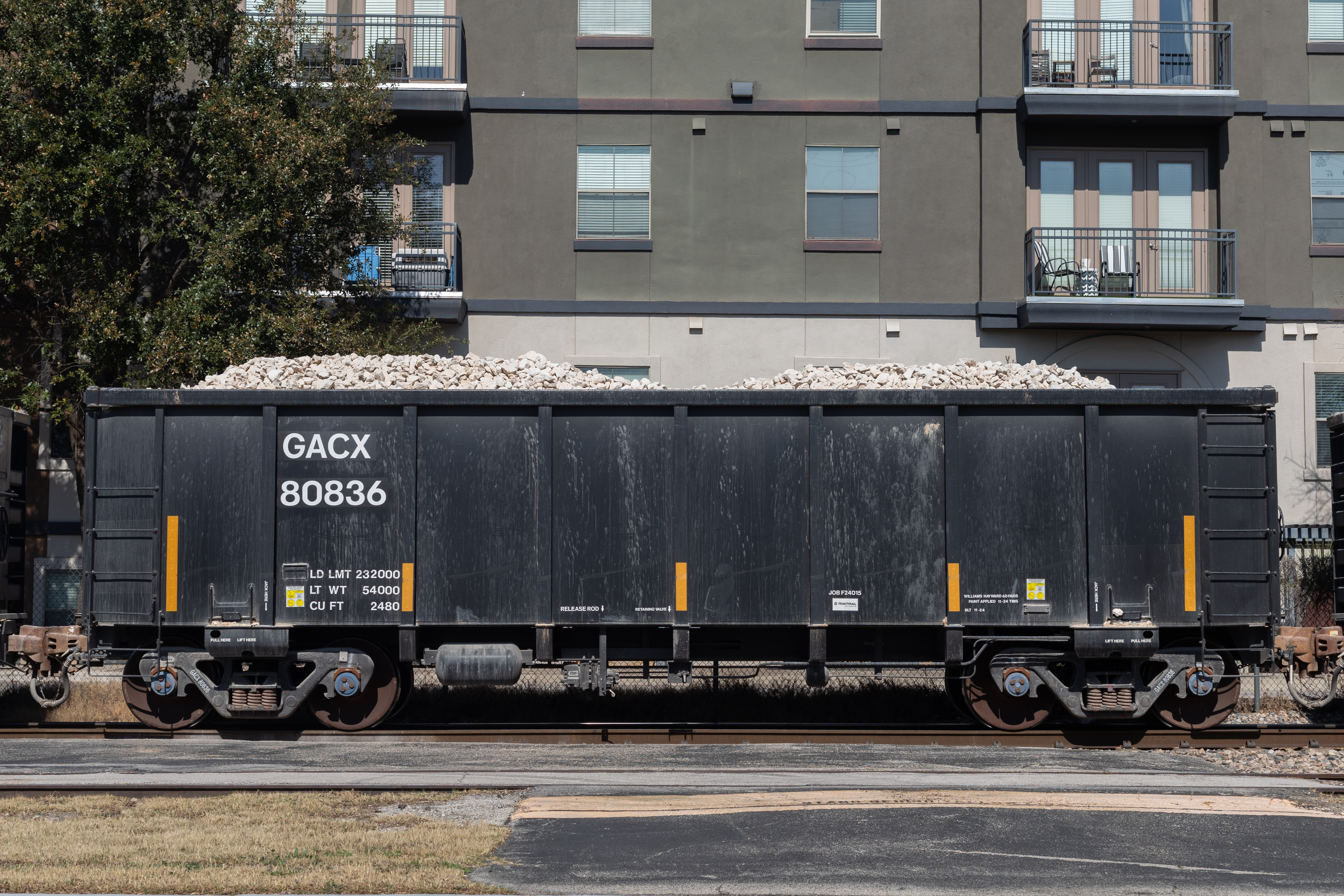
A GACX aggregate gondola in Austin, Texas

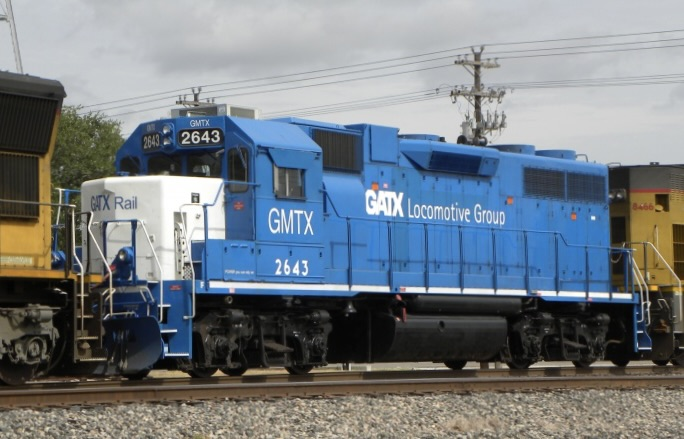
A GMTX GP38-2 in Kyle, Texas

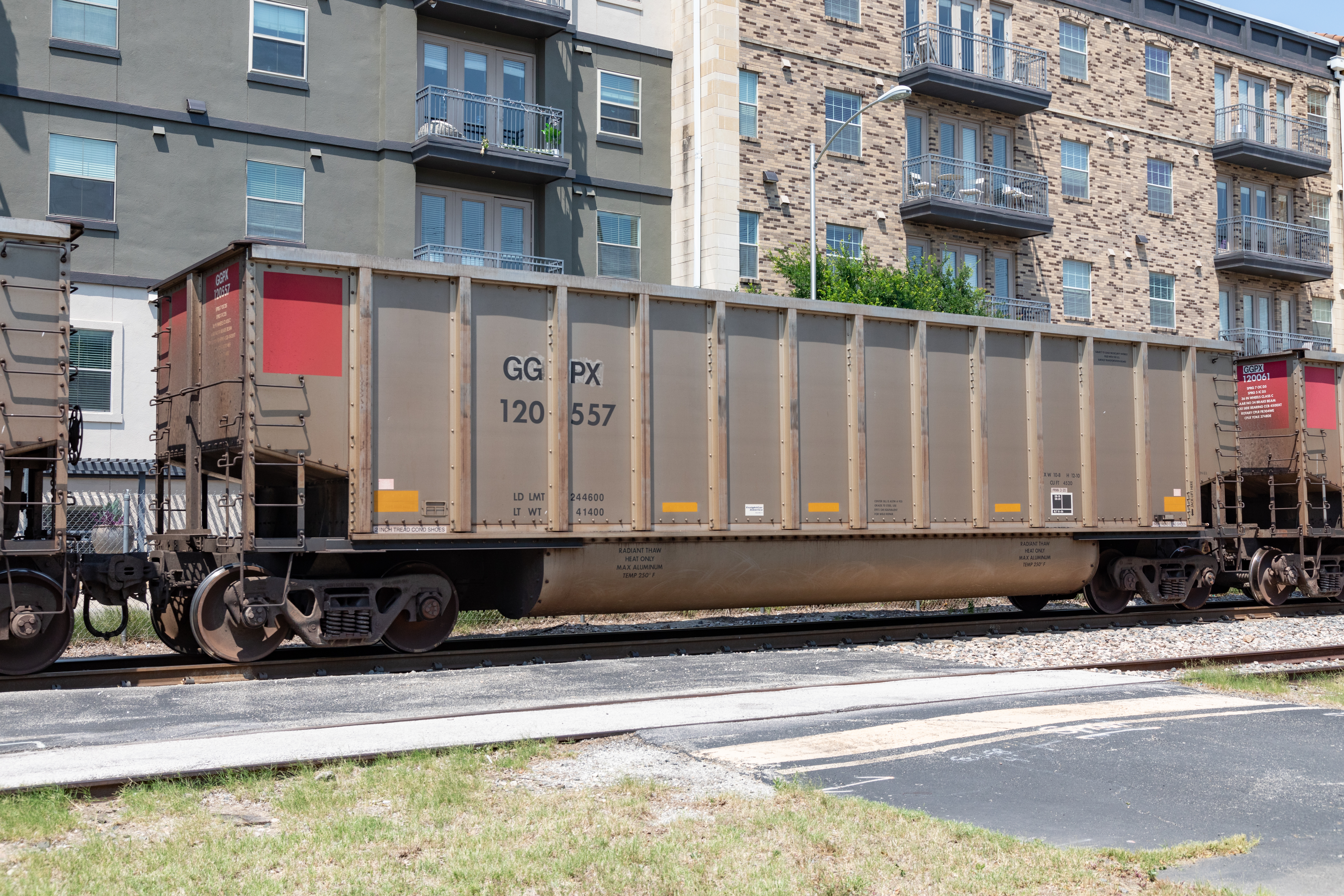
A GGPX bathtub coal gondola in Austin, Texas.

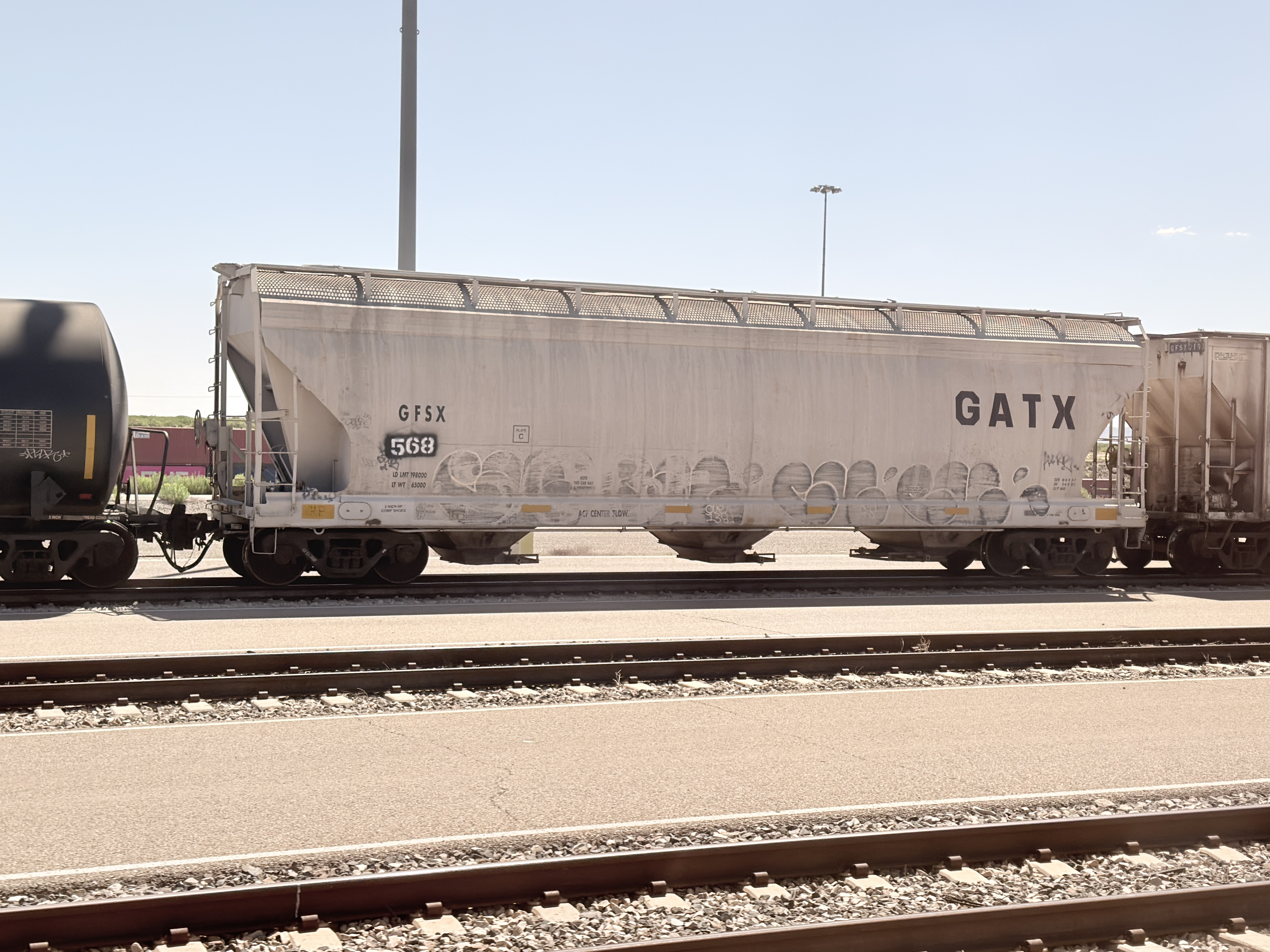
A GFSX covered hopper in Santa Teresa, New Mexico.
