= General American Marks Company =

The General American Marks Company is a part of GATX Corporation, formerly the General American Transportation Company, headquartered in Chicago. GATX Corporation owns businesses that lease railcars, locomotives, and aircraft.

Some past and present locomotive and railcar reporting marks for GATX companies, including General American Marks Company and GATX Rail, are GMTX, GABX, GACX, GATX, GSCX and GCCX.
