= Wells Fargo Rail =

American Railcar Leasing Company

- Type: Subsidiary
- Industry: Rail transportation
- Predecessor: First Union Rail; GE Capital Rail Services
- Founded: January 1, 2016; 10 years ago
- Defunct: January 1, 2026; 8 months ago
- Headquarters: Rosemont, Illinois, U.S.
- Parent: Wells Fargo
- Website: firstunionrail.wellsfargo.com

Wells Fargo Rail (reporting marks WFRX, FURX (Note: Formerly used by First Union Rail, now inherited by Wells Fargo Rail), FBRX (Note: Formerly used by the Fiske Brothers Refinery Company, later acquired by First Union Rail), SPTX (Note: Formerly used by Sugar Products Company, later acquired by Trinity Rail Management, then First Union Rail, then Wells Fargo Rail)) was a railcar and locomotive operating lessor combined from both the historic First Union Rail Corporation along with the former GE Capital Rail Services, which Wells Fargo purchased from GE in September 2015. The new company/name took effect January 1, 2016, and was based in Rosemont, Illinois, USA. Wells Fargo Rail was the largest railcar and locomotive lessor in North America with more than 135,000 railcars and 850 locomotives. In 2025, GATX partnered with Brookfield Infrastructure Partners to acquire Wells Fargo Rail's $4.4 billion railcar portfolio. The deal closed in early 2026.

== Equipment ==
=== Railcars ===
- Autoracks—for transporting vehicles, can be bi-level or tri-level
- Box cars
- Flatcars
  - Centerbeam flatcar
- Gondolas - (Rotary Dump Coal Gondola)
- Hopper cars - (Both Covered & Open Hoppers)
- Intermodals
  - Double stacked Intermodals
- Tank car

=== Locomotives ===
- EMD GP38-2
- EMD GP40-2
- EMD MP15DC/EMD MP15AC
- EMD SD40-2
- EMD SD70MAC

== Services ==
Wells Fargo Rail provides various services to its rail customers. It leases the railcars and locomotives and also provides financing for the leases (Operating Leases, Net Lease, Full Service Lease and Car Hire Arrangement). This includes Sale/Leaseback (buying rail stock from company and leasing it back to them), Portfolio Acquisitions, Asset Sales and Lease/Sublease.

It also offers Management Services and various Marketing Services.

== Gallery ==
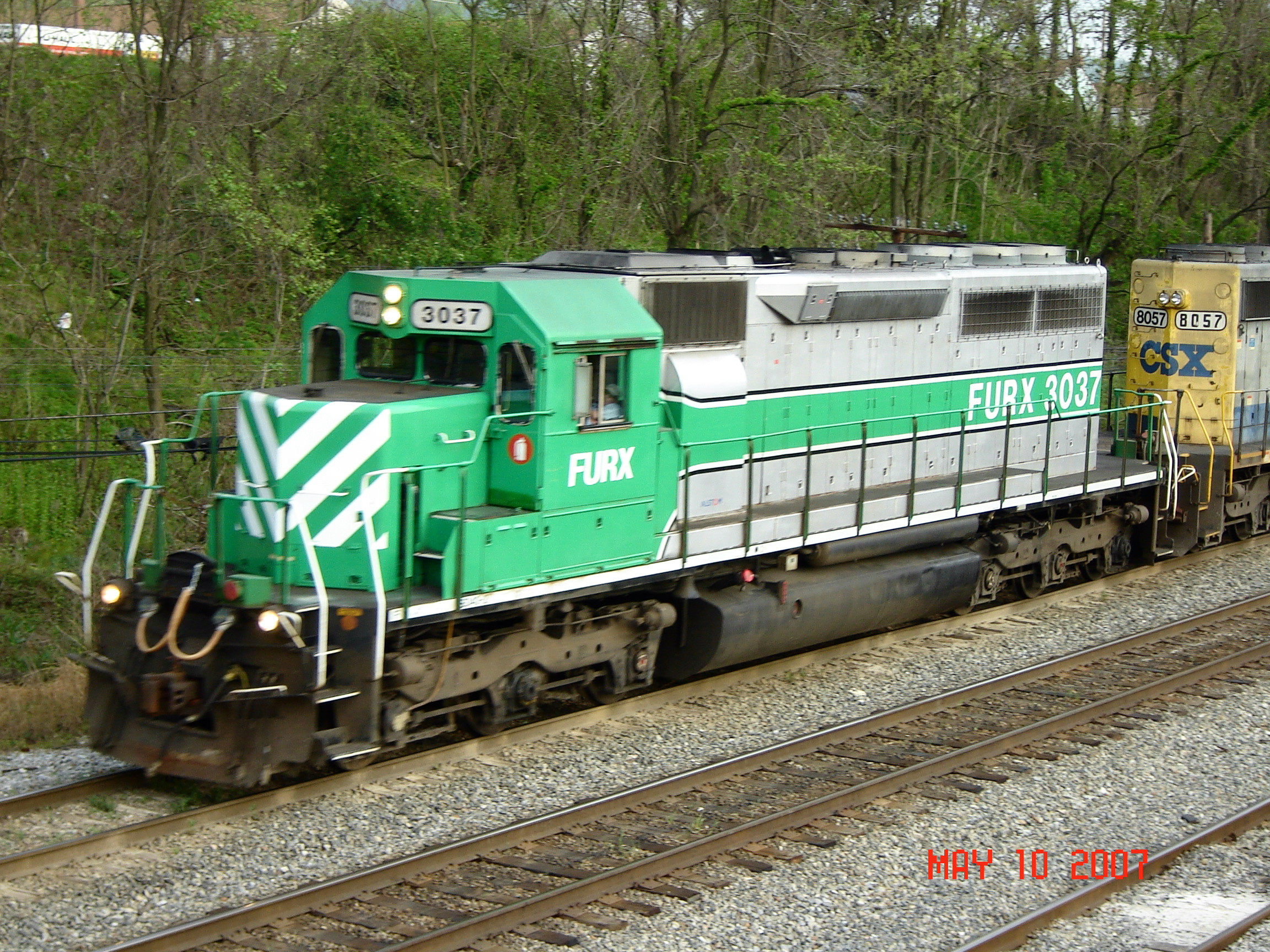
An FURX SD40-2

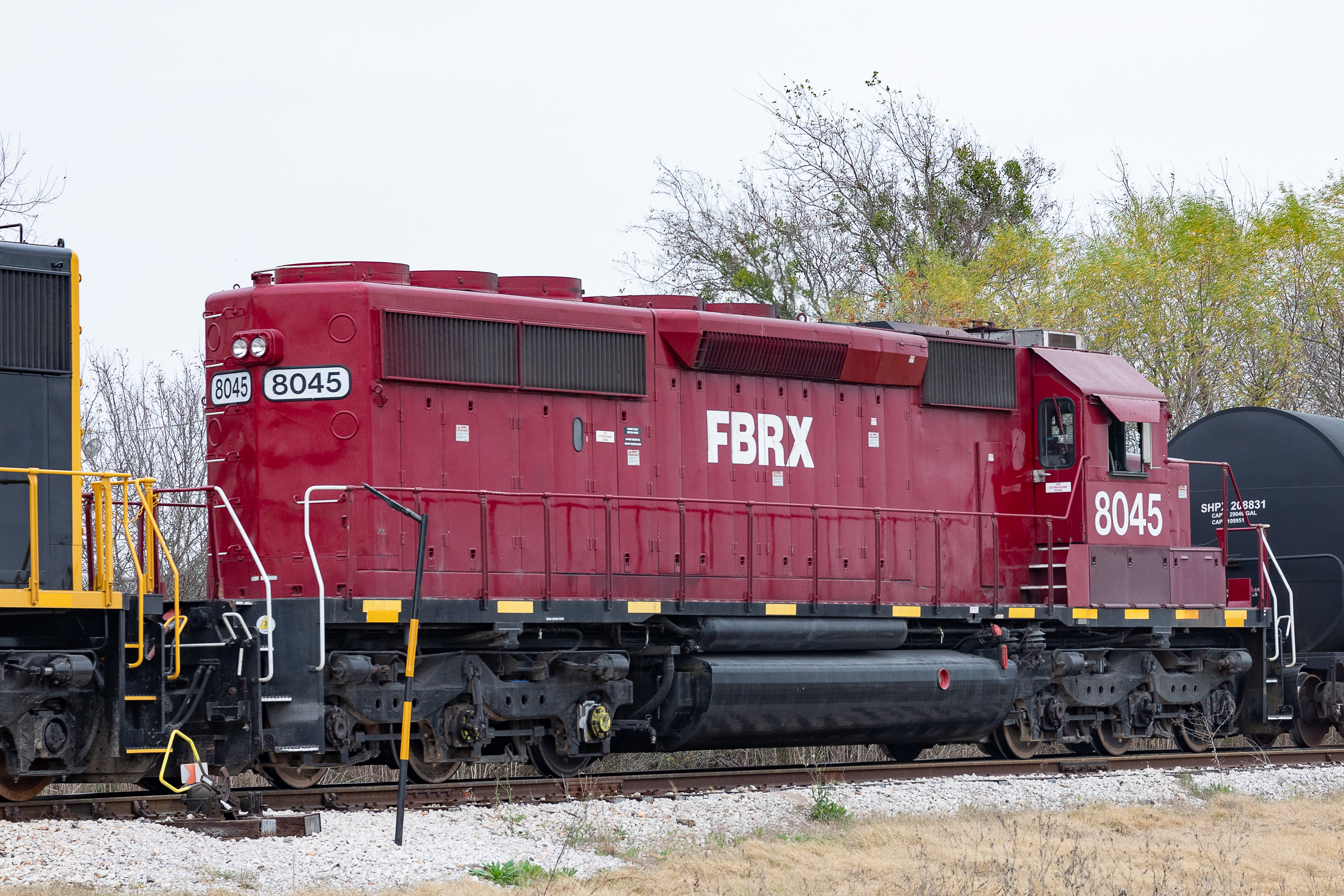
An FBRX SD40-2 in Manor, Texas.

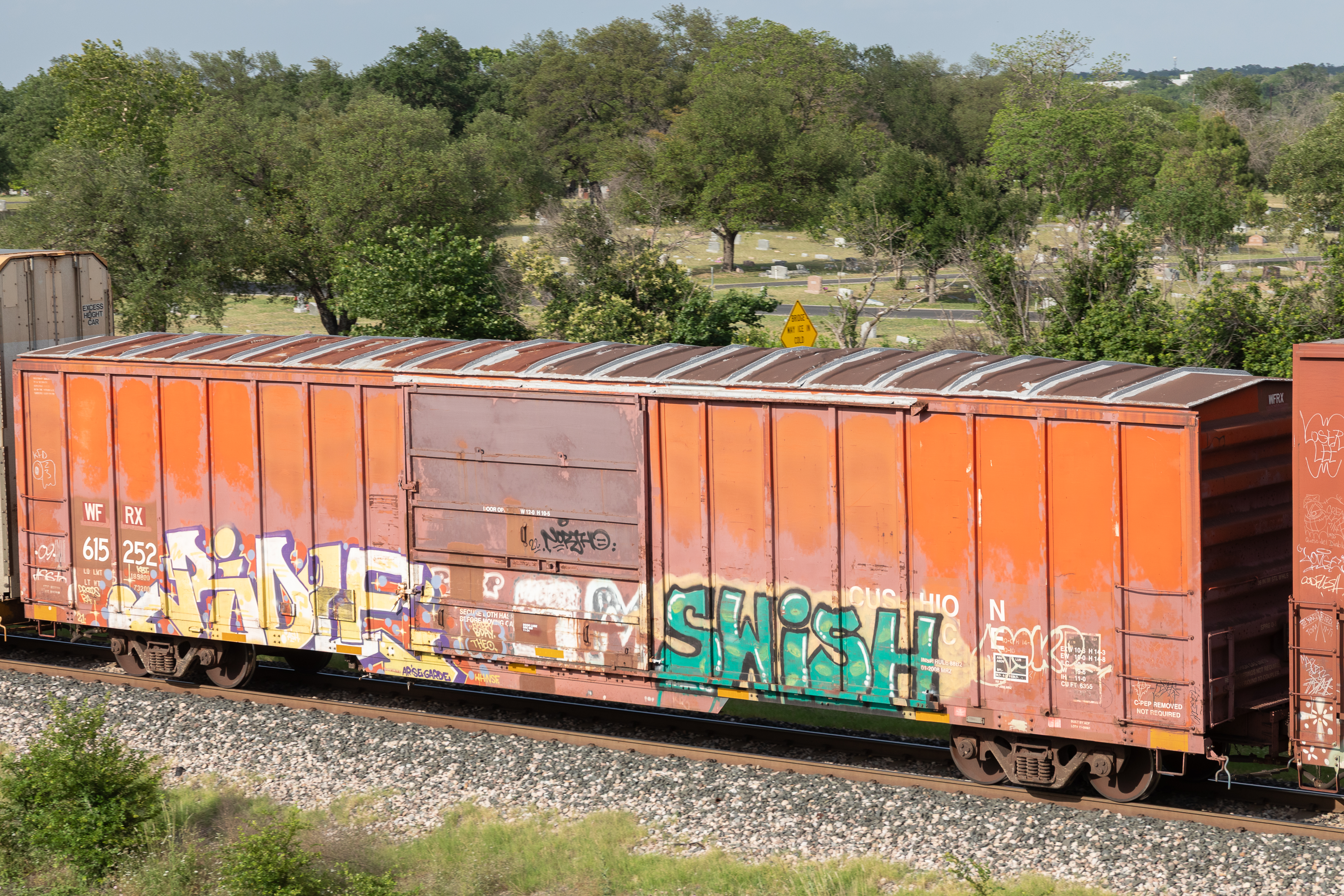
A WFRX boxcar in Austin, Texas

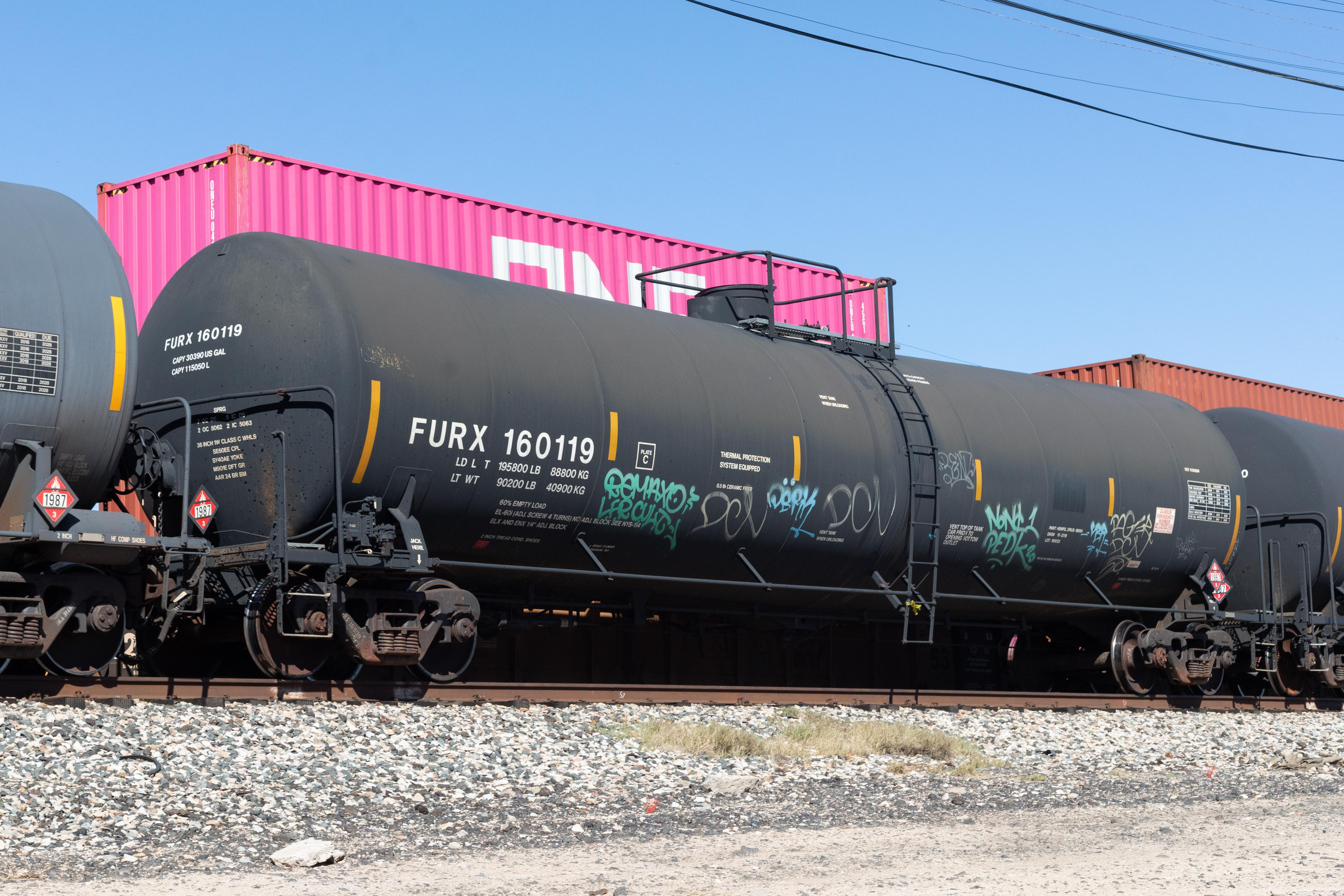
An FURX tank car in Tucson, Arizona.

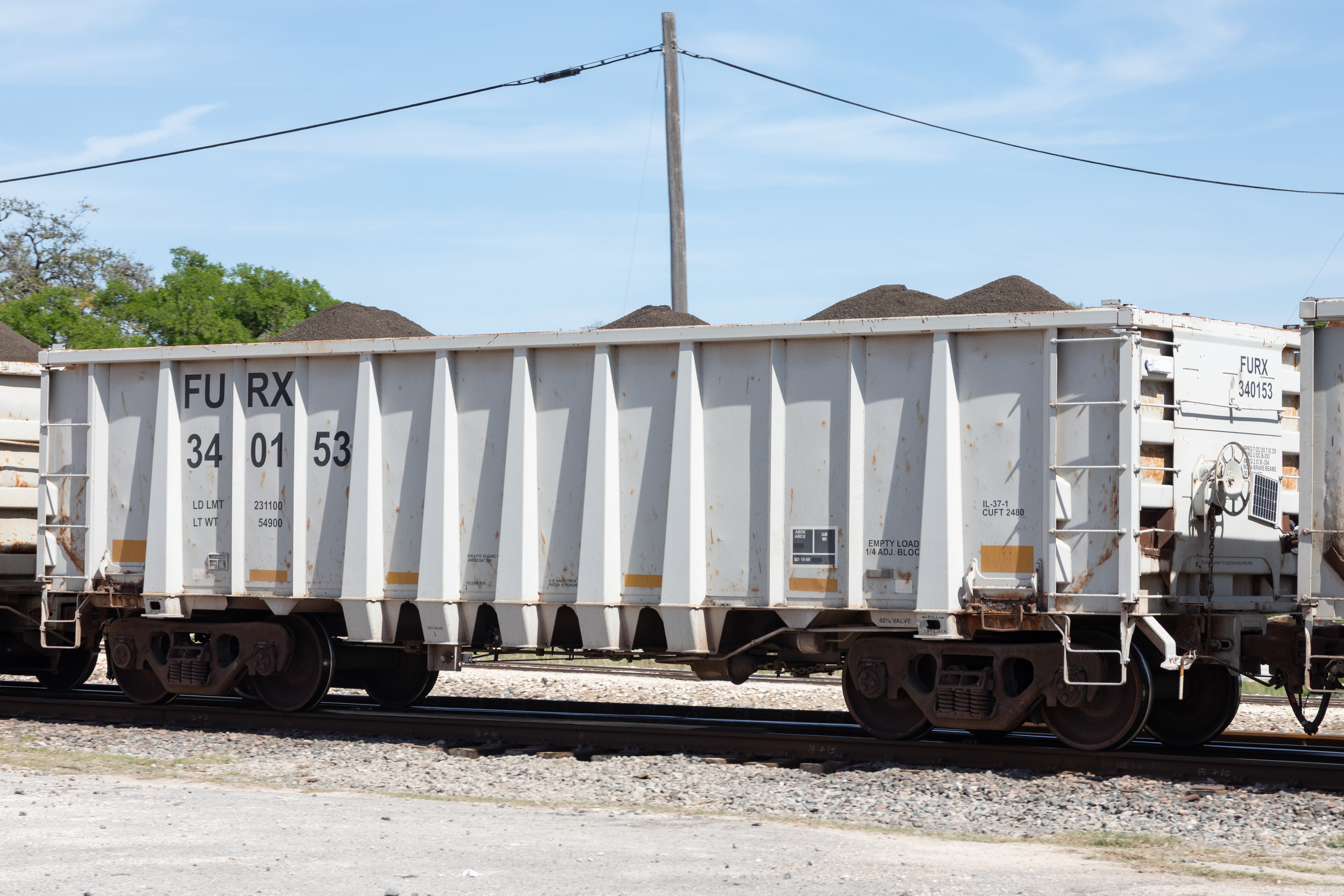
An FURX aggregate gondola in McNeil, Texas.

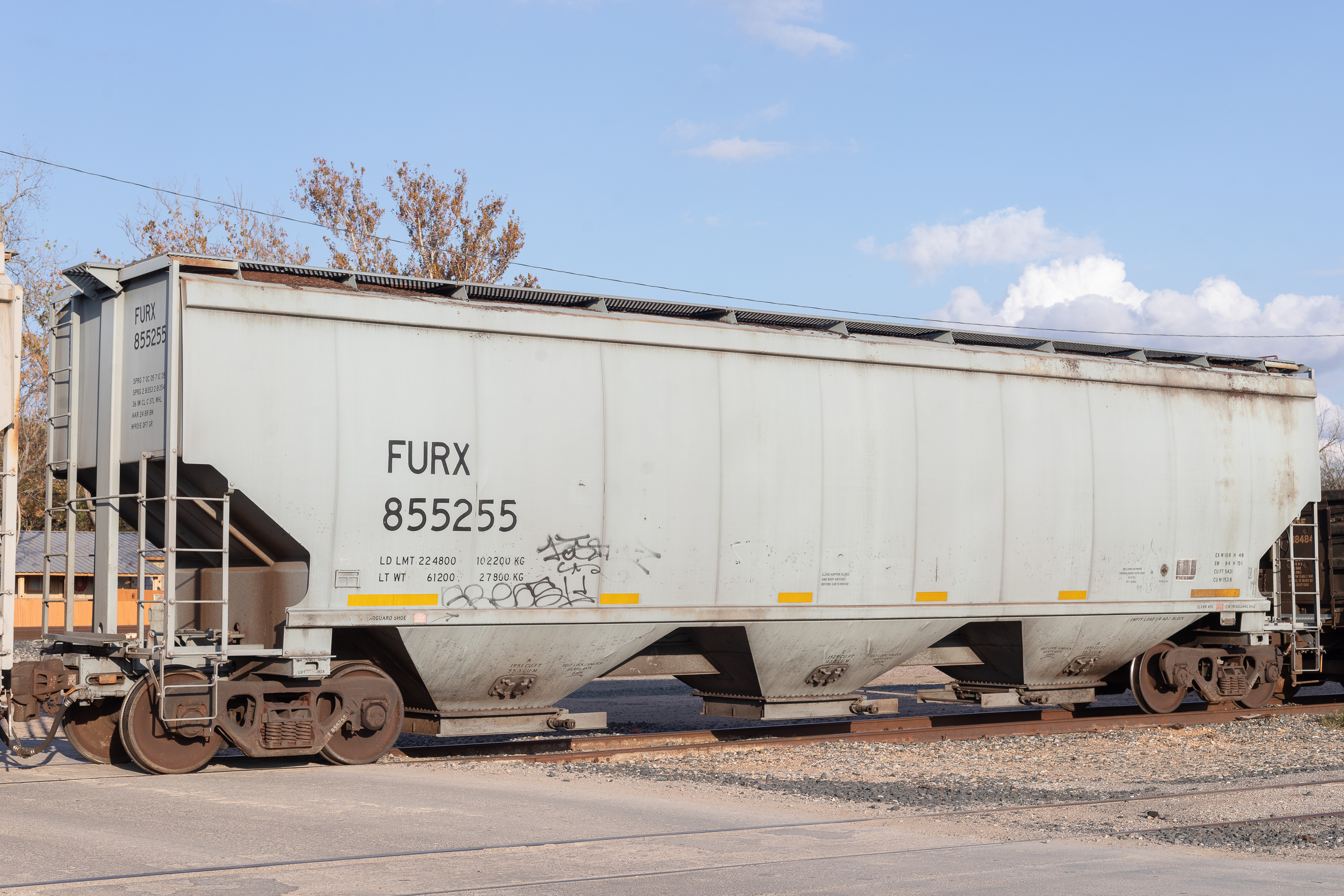
An FURX covered hopper in Smithville, Texas.

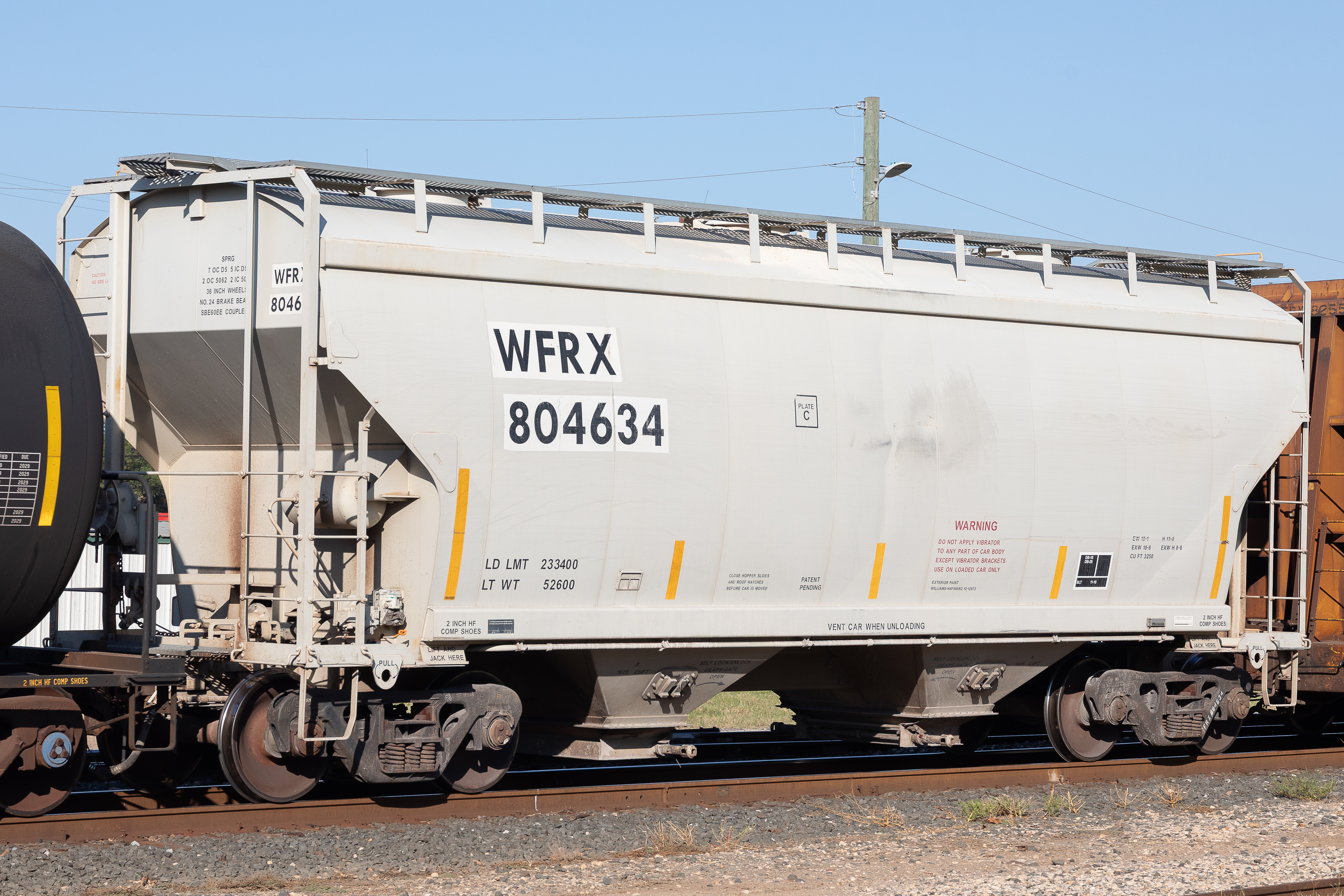
A WFRX covered hopper in Hearne, Texas.
