= List of preserved EMD SD40-series locomotives =

This is a summary, listing every diesel locomotive from the SD40-series in preservation. This list includes the models SD40, SDP40, SD40A, SD40-2, SDP40F, SD40T-2, SD40-2W, SD40-2S.

== SD40 (EMD-built) ==
Photograph	Serial no.	Locomotive	Build date	Former operators	Retire date	Disposition and location	Notes	References
	31899	Norfolk and Western 1580	May 1966	Norfolk and Western Railway (N&W); Norfolk Southern Railway (NS)	August 2009	Owned by the Roanoke Chapter of the National Railway Historical Society		
	32135	Western Maryland 7471	August 1966	Western Maryland Railway (WM); CSX (CSXT); Morrison–Knudsen (MK); Helm Financial (HCLX); Georges Creek Railway (GCK)	-	Operational, Owned by Precision Locomotive Leasing (PNLX)		
	34105	CSX 4621	August 1966	Western Maryland Railway (WM); CSX (CSXT)	-	Stored at the Western Maryland Scenic Railroad in Cumberland, Maryland	Privately owned, to be restored to original Western Maryland livery and number.	
	34759	Louisville and Nashville 1230	April 1969	Louisville and Nashville Railroad (L&N); Seaboard Coast Line Railroad (SCL); Seaboard System Railroad (SBD); CSX Transportation (CSX); Morrison–Knudsen (M–K); Utah Railway (UTAH); Wisconsin and Southern Railroad (W&S); FirstEnergy (FE); Tyner Terminal Railroad (TTRR)	-	Operational at the Tennessee Valley Railroad Museum in Chattanooga, Tennessee		
	37211	Chesapeake and Ohio 7534	March 1971	Chesapeake and Ohio Railway (C&O); CSX Transportation (CSX)	2017	On static display at the C&O Historical Society in Clifton Forge, Virginia		
	37355	Southern 3170	April 1971	Southern Railway (SOU); Norfolk Southern Railway (NS)	2007, 2016	Stored at the Tennessee Valley Railroad Museum in Chattanooga, Tennessee		
	38931	Progress Rail 3066	November 1971	Ferrocarriles Nacionales de México (NdeM); Transportacion Ferroviaria Mexicana (TFM); Progress Rail Services (PRS)	2013	On static display at the Coastal Pines Technical College in Waycross, Georgia		

=== Preserved EMD-built SD40 parts ===
Serial no.	Locomotive	Build date	Model	Former operators	Retire date	Preserved part(s)	Location	Notes	References
31913	Norfolk Southern 1594	July 1966	SD40	Norfolk and Western Railway (N&W); Norfolk Southern Railway (NS)	December 21, 2007	Cab	On static display at the Virginia Museum of Transportation in Roanoke, Virginia		

== Rebuilt SD40 (EMD-built) ==
Photograph	Serial no.	Locomotive	Build date	Model	Rebuild date	Rebuilder	Former operators	Retire date	Disposition and location	Notes	References
	31556	Southern Pacific 7362	May 1966	SD40R	April 10, 1981	SP's Sacramento shops	Southern Pacific Transportation Company (SP); Union Pacific Railroad (UP)	June 29, 1998	On static display at Mid-Plains Community College in North Platte, Nebraska		
	32043	Atchison, Topeka and Santa Fe 5007	April 1966	SD40u	December 1981	ATSF's San Bernardino shops	Atchison, Topeka and Santa Fe Railway (AT&SF); Burlington Northern and Santa Fe Railway (BNSF); Great Northern Railway (GN) (Note: Though the Great Northern Railway went defunct in 1970, ATSF 5007 and 5008 was operated under BNSF and operated as a GN locomotive)	-	On static display at the Western America Railroad Museum in Barstow, California		
	32044	Atchison, Topeka and Santa Fe 5008	April 1966	SD40u	September 1981	ATSF's San Bernardino shops	Atchison, Topeka and Santa Fe Railway (AT&SF); Burlington Northern and Santa Fe Railway (BNSF); Great Northern Railway (GN)	2009	On static display at Marceline, Missouri		

== SD40 (GMD-built) ==
Photograph	Serial no.	Locomotive	Build date	Model	Former operators	Retire date	Disposition and location	Notes	References
	A2133	Canadian Pacific 5500	July 1966	SD40	Canadian Pacific Railway (CP)	2001	On static display at the Revelstoke Railway Museum in Revelstoke, British Columbia	CP class DRF-30a	
	A2594	Canadian National 5232	November 1971	SD40	Canadian National Railway (CN); Athabasca Northern Railway (ANR); Cando Contracting Limited (CCLX)	-	Under ownership of the Vintage Locomotive Society in Winnipeg, Manitoba	CN class GF-30m	

== SD40X ==
Serial no.	Locomotive	Build date	Model	Former operators	Retire date	Disposition and location	Notes	References
29025	Illinois Central 6071	July 1964	SD40-2R	Gulf, Mobile and Ohio Railroad (GM&O); Illinois Central Gulf Railroad (ICG); Illinois Central Railroad (IC); Canadian National Railway (CN)	March 11, 2009	On static display at the Monticello Railway Museum in Monticello, Illinois		

== SDP40 ==
Photograph	Serial no.	Locomotive	Build date	Former operators	Retire date	Disposition and location	Notes	References
	31597	Great Northern 325	May 1966	Great Northern Railway (GN); Burlington Northern Railroad (BN); Burlington Northern and Santa Fe Railway (BNSF)	May 2009	Operational at the Minnesota Transportation Museum in Saint Paul, Minnesota		

== SD40A ==
Photograph	Serial no.	Locomotive	Build date	Former operators	Retire date	Disposition and location	Notes	References
	34947	Illinois Central 6014	May 1966	Illinois Central Railroad (IC); Illinois Central Gulf Railroad (ICG); Indiana Box Car Corporation (IBCX)	-	Undergoing restoration to operating condition by Railexco in Eden Prairie, Minnesota.		

== SD40-2 (EMD-built) ==
Photograph	Serial no.	Locomotive	Build date	Model	Former operators	Retire date	Disposition and location	Notes	References
	7396-27	Milwaukee Road 156	August 1972	SD40-2	Milwaukee Road (MILW); Soo Line Railroad (SOO); Ferrocarriles Nacionales de México (NdeM); Kansas City Southern de México (KCS); Maine Central Railroad (MEC); Pan Am Railways (PAR); Dieselmotive Company, Inc. (BUGX)	August 1987	Cosmetically restored into its "Bicentennial" attire by the Midwest Overland Rail Preservation Society (MOPX) in Perry, Oklahoma	MILW class 30-ERS-6	
	74609-32	Chicago and North Western 6847	March 1974	SD40-2	Chicago and North Western Transportation Company (C&NW); Union Pacific Railroad (UP)	December 2008	Operational at the Illinois Railway Museum in Union, Illinois		
	776086-24	Norfolk and Western 6162	May 1978	SD40-2	Norfolk and Western (N&W); Norfolk Southern (NS)	June 2020	Operational at the Kentucky Steam Heritage Corporation in Ravenna, Kentucky	Repainted to its original livery in 2023.	
	776088-14	Branson Scenic Railway 3460	March 1978	SD40-2	Union Pacific Railroad (UP); Capital Finance, Inc. (CEFX); Norfolk Southern Railway (NS); Mervis Recycling; Indiana Box Car Corporation (IBCX)	October 31, 2000 (UP); 2020 (NS)	Operational at the Branson Scenic Railway (BSR) in Branson, Missouri		
	786181-8	Union Pacific 3105	June 1979	SD40-2C	Missouri Pacific Railroad (MP); Union Pacific Railroad (UP)	December 2013	On static display at the RailGiants Train Museum in Pomona, California		
	786218-20	Rapid City, Pierre and Eastern 3422	August 1979	SD40-2	Union Pacific Railroad (UP); Iowa, Chicago and Eastern Railroad (ICE); Rapid City, Pierre and Eastern Railroad (RCPE)	January 31, 2003 (UP)	Donated to the American Heartland Railroad Society in Sioux City, Iowa		
	786269-9	Union Pacific 9950	April 1980	SD40-2	Missouri Pacific Railroad (MP); Union Pacific Railroad (UP)	August 22, 2001	On static display at the Western America Railroad Museum at Barstow, California		

== SD40-2 (GMD-built) ==
Photograph	Serial no.	Locomotive	Build date	Model	Former operators	Retire date	Disposition and location	Notes	References
	A2576	Canadian Pacific 5577	March 1972	SD40-2	Canadian Pacific Railway (CP); Pennsylvania Northeastern Railroad (PN)	February 2006	Operational on the New Hope Railroad in New Hope, Pennsylvania	CP class DRF-30s	
	A3670	Canadian Pacific 5903	December 1978	SD40-2	Canadian Pacific Railway (CP)	2018	On static display at ExpoRail in Saint-Constant, Quebec	CP class DRF-30s	

== SDP40F ==
Photograph	Serial no.	Locomotive	Build date	Model	Former operators	Retire date	Disposition and location	Notes	References
	74611-65	BNSF 6976	October 1974	SDF40-2	Amtrak (AMTK); Atchison, Topeka and Santa Fe Railway (ATSF); BNSF Railway (BNSF); Dynamic Rail Preservation (DYMX)	May 2002	Operational at the Illinois Railway Museum in Union, Illinois		

== SD40T-2 ==
Photograph	Serial no.	Locomotive	Build date	Former operators	Retire date	Disposition and location	Notes	References
	756046-16	Denver and Rio Grande Western 5371	August 1975	Denver and Rio Grande Western Railroad (D&RGW); Union Pacific Railroad (UP)	December 5, 2008	On static display at the Utah State Railroad Museum in Ogden, Utah		
	776098-2	Alabama and Tennessee River 5387	August 1978	Denver and Rio Grande Western Railroad (D&RGW); Southern Pacific Railroad (SP); Larry's Truck and Electric (LTEX); Alabama and Tennessee River Railway (ATN)	May 22, 2001	Operational, owned by the Midwest Overland Rail Preservation Society in Perry, Oklahoma		
	786174-42	Union Pacific 8755	January 1979	Southern Pacific Transportation Company (SP); Union Pacific Railroad (UP)	January 24, 2008	Stored at the Fire Training Academy, at San Antonio, Texas		
	786264-4	Denver and Rio Grande Western 5401	March 1980	Denver and Rio Grande Western Railroad (D&RGW); Union Pacific Railroad (UP)	April 12, 2010	Awaiting cosmetic restoration by the Colorado Railroad Museum in Golden, Colorado		

== See also ==
- List of preserved EMD locomotives
- List of preserved EMD GP7 locomotives
- List of preserved EMD GP9 locomotives
- List of preserved EMD SD9 locomotives
