= List of reporting marks: Y =

Note: Marks ending in U are for container owners; marks ending in X are not common carriers; marks ending in Z are for trailers without flanged wheels. All other marks are of common-carrier railroads.

== Y ==
- YAN - Yancey Railroad
- YARR - Youngstown and Austintown Railroad
- YB - Youngstown Belt Railroad
- YCR - Yakima Central Railway
- YCRK - Yellow Creek Railroad
- YDHR - York Durham Heritage Railway
- YRC - York Railway
- YKR - Yorkrail; York Railway
- YRPL - Yelm Roy Prairie Line
- YS - Youngstown and Southern Railway
- YSDX - Youngstown Steel Door Company
- YSMX - Canadian Gypsum Company
- YSRR - Youngstown and Southeastern Railroad
- YSTX - Youngstown Sheet and Tube Company
- YSVR - Yellowstone Valley Railroad
- YV - Yosemite Valley Railway
- YVT - Yakima Valley Transportation Company
- YW - Yreka Western Railroad
