= List of preserved EMD GP9 locomotives =

This is a summary, listing every EMD GP9 locomotive in preservation.

== EMD-built (high hood; GP9) ==
Photograph	Serial no.	Locomotive	Build date	Former operators	Retire date	Disposition and location	Notes	References
	19201	Indiana Transportation Museum 200	April 1954	Union Pacific Railroad (UP); Rail Car Corporation (RCCX); Dixie Railroad; Great Smoky Mountains Railroad (GSMR); Central Railroad of Indianapolis (CERA); Indiana Transportation Museum (ITMZ)	March 6, 1980	Operational on the Nickel Plate Express		
	19893	Great Western Railway 296	September 1954	Union Pacific Railroad (UP); Great Western Railway (GWR)	March 18, 1985	Undergoing restoration at the Heber Valley Railroad in Heber, Utah		
	20696	Western Pacific 725	September 1955	Western Pacific Railroad (WP); Union Pacific Railroad (UP)	May 1985	On static display at the Western Pacific Railroad Museum in Portola, California		
	20698	Western Pacific 727	September 1955	Western Pacific Railroad (WP)	February 1984	On static display at the Elko Railroad Park, Elko, Nevada		
	20704	Pennsylvania Railroad 7000	October 1955	Pennsylvania Railroad (PRR); Penn Central (PC); Conrail (CR); New Jersey Transit (NJT)	-	Operational at the Cape May Seashore Lines in New Jersey		
	20710	Pennsylvania Railroad 7006	October 1955	Pennsylvania Railroad (PRR); Penn Central (PC); Conrail (CR)	1985	On static display at the Railroad Museum of Pennsylvania in Strasburg, Pennsylvania		
	20752	Pennsylvania Railroad 7048	December 1955	Pennsylvania Railroad (PRR); Penn Central (PC); Conrail (CR)	1985	On static display at the Horseshoe Curve, Altoona, Pennsylvania		
	20754	Western Pacific 731	September 1955	Western Pacific Railroad (WP); Union Pacific Railroad (UP)	May 1985	On static display at the Western Pacific Railroad Museum in Portola, California		
	20849	Shenandoah Valley Railroad 40	August 1955	Chesapeake and Ohio Railway (C&O); Chessie System (WM); Allegany Central Railroad (ALGC); Virginia Central Railway (VC); Durbin and Greenbrier Valley Railroad (DGVR)	-	Operational at the Shenandoah Valley Railroad in Harrisonburg, Virginia	Currently wears C&O Colors and has been renumbered to 5940.	
	21090	Northern Pacific 245	February 1956	Northern Pacific Railway (NP); Burlington Northern Railroad (BN); Independent Locomotive Service (ILSX); North Shore Scenic Railroad (LSRX)	-	Operational at the Lake Superior Railroad Museum in Duluth, Minnesota		
	21703	Port of Tillamook Bay 101	June 1956	Chesapeake and Ohio Railway (C&O); Huron and Eastern Railway (HESR); Idaho Northern and Pacific Railroad (INDR); Port of Tillamook Bay Railroad (POTB)	-	Operational at the Oregon Coast Scenic Railroad (OHCR) in Garibaldi, Oregon	Named "County of Sanilac" by HESR	
	22036	Conway Scenic 1751	September 1956	Chesapeake and Ohio Railway (C&O); Baltimore and Ohio Railroad (B&O); Buffalo and Pittsburgh Railroad (BPRR); Finger Lakes Railway (FLGK)	-	Operational at the Conway Scenic Railroad in North Conway, New Hampshire		
	22050	Belton, Grandview and Kansas City 102	September 1956	Chesapeake and Ohio Railway (C&O); Baltimore and Ohio Railroad (B&O); Huron and Eastern Railway (HESR); Idaho Northern and Pacific Railroad (INDR); Western Rail, Inc. (WRIX)	-	Operational at the Belton, Grandview and Kansas City Railroad in Belton, Missouri		
	22243	West Chester 6499	October 1956	Baltimore and Ohio Railroad (B&O); Ohio Central Railroad System (OHCR)	-	Operational at the West Chester Railroad in West Chester, Pennsylvania		
	22256	Baltimore and Ohio 6607	October 1956	Baltimore and Ohio Railroad (B&O); Chessie System (B&O); Golden Spike Railroad Services (GSRX)	July 16, 1986	Operational at the National Museum of Railroad History & Innovation in Baltimore, Maryland		
	22561	Black Hills Central 63	November 1956	Chesapeake and Ohio Railway (C&O); Indiana and Ohio Railway (IORY); Northeast Kansas and Missouri (NEKM); Chillicothe-Brunswick Rail Maintenance (CBRM); Progressive Rail (PGR)	-	Operational at the Black Hills Central Railroad in Keystone, South Dakota		
	22739	Plymouth and Lincoln 1921	November 1956	Northern Pacific Railway (NP); Burlington Northern Railroad (BN); MBTA Commuter Rail (MBTX)	-	Stored at the Plymouth and Lincoln Railroad in Lincoln, New Hampshire		
	22863	MBTA 902	January 1957	Grand Trunk Western (GTW); South East Michigan Trans Authority (SEMTA); MBTA Commuter Rail (MBTX)	-	On static display at the Illinois Railway Museum in Union, Illinois		
	22986	Baltimore and Ohio 6512	May 1957	Baltimore and Ohio Railroad (B&O); Durbin and Greenbrier Valley Railroad (DGVR)	-	Operational at the Shenandoah Valley Railroad in Harrisonburg, Virginia		
	23006	Durbin and Greenbrier Valley 6532	June 1957	Baltimore and Ohio Railroad (B&O); Aggregate Industries (AI); Durbin and Greenbrier Valley Railroad (DGVR)	-	Operational at the Cass Scenic Railroad (CSRR) at Cass, West Virginia		
	23224	Heber Valley 5926	December 1957	Boston and Maine Railroad (B&M); Springfield Terminal Railway (ST); Pan Am Railways (PAR)	-	Operational at the Heber Valley Railroad in Heber City, Utah		
	23230	Boston and Maine 1732	May 1957	Boston and Maine Railroad (B&M); Springfield Terminal Railway (ST)	-	Stored at the Railroad Museum of New England in Thomaston, Connecticut		
	23236	Heber Valley 5938	June 1957	Boston and Maine Railroad (B&M); Springfield Terminal Railway (ST); Pan Am Railways (PAR)	-	Under restoration at the Heber Valley Railroad in Heber City, Utah		
	23239	Boston and Maine 1741	July 1957	Boston and Maine Railroad (B&M); Springfield Terminal Railway (ST)	-	Operational at the Conway Scenic Railroad in North Conway, New Hampshire		
	24301	Adirondack Scenic 6076	October 1957	Pennsylvania Railroad (PRR); Penn Central (PC); Conrail (CR); Adirondack Railroad (ADIX)	-	Operational at the Northern Central Railway of York in New Freedom, Pennsylvania		
	24505	Nickel Plate 514	March 1958	Nickel Plate Road (NKP); Norfolk and Western Railway (N&W); Norfolk Southern Railway (NS)	April 5, 1985	Operational at the Steamtown National Historic Site in Scranton, Pennsylvania		
	24772	Norfolk and Western 620	October 1958	Norfolk and Western Railway (N&W)	September 16, 1985	Operational at the North Carolina Transportation Museum (NCTM) in Spencer, North Carolina		
	24827	Norfolk and Western 675	February 1959	Norfolk and Western Railway (N&W); Mid-America Locomotive and Car Repair Inc. (MALX)	April 16, 1987	Operational at the Bluegrass Scenic Railroad and Museum in Versailles, Kentucky		
	24838	Norfolk and Western 686	February 1959	Norfolk and Western Railway (N&W); Norfolk Southern Railway (NS); Hampton and Branchville Railroad (H&B)	April 16, 1987	Operational at the Railroad Museum of New England in Thomaston, Connecticut		
	24868	Norfolk and Western 859	June 1959	Norfolk and Western Railway (N&W); Norfolk Southern Railway (NS); Hampton and Branchville Railroad (H&B)	April 16, 1987	Operational at the Railroad Museum of New England in Thomaston, Connecticut		
	24956	Norfolk and Western 514	November 1958	Norfolk and Western Railway (N&W); Tennessee Southern (TSRR); Indiana Boxcar Corporation (IBCX); Keystone Cooperative (KC)	April 16, 1987	Unrestored, under ownership of the Roanoke Chapter of the National Railway Historical Society		
	24963	Norfolk and Western 521	December 1958	Norfolk and Western Railway (N&W)	February 10, 1988	On static display at the Virginia Museum of Transportation in Roanoke, Virginia		
	24968	Grand Trunk Western 4138	November 1958	Grand Trunk Western Railroad (GTW); Central Vermont Railroad (CV)	-	Operational at the Prairie Dog Central Railway at Winnipeg, Manitoba		
	25091	Otter Tail Valley 1483	January 1959	Nickel Plate Road (NKP); Norfolk and Western Railway (N&W); Dakota, Minnesota and Eastern Railroad (DME); Minnesota Northern Railroad (MNN)	April 22, 1985	Operational at the Belfast and Moosehead Lake Railroad in Unity, Maine	Leased to the Belfast and Moosehead Lake by the Otter Tail Valley Railroad, named "City of Springfield" by DME	

== EMD-built (high hood; rebuilt GP9) ==
Photograph	Serial no.	Locomotive	Build date	Model	Rebuild date	Rebuilder	Former operators	Retire date	Disposition and location	Notes	References
	19373	OKRX 1	June 1954	GP10	November 1967	IC's Paducah, Kentucky shops	Illinois Central Railroad (IC); Chattahoochee Industrial Railroad (CIRR); Georgia Pacific Paper (GAPX)	-	Stored at the Oklahoma Railway Museum in Oklahoma City, Oklahoma		
	19483	Southern Pacific 3194	May 1954	GP9R	April 21, 1978	SP's Sacramento shops	Texas and New Orleans Railroad (T&NO); Southern Pacific Transportation Company (SP); Union Pacific Railroad (UP)	March 26, 1997	Operational at the Golden Gate Railroad Museum in Schellville, California		
	19485	Baltimore and Ohio 6641	May 1954	GP9R	October 21, 1977	SP's Sacramento shops	Texas and New Orleans Railroad (T&NO); Southern Pacific Transportation Company (SP); Western Pacific Railroad Museum (WPRM); Connecticut Central Railroad (CCCL); Providence and Worcester Railroad (PW); Housatonic Railroad (HRRC); New Hampshire Central Railroad (NHCR)	1993	Operational at the West Virginia Central Railroad (WVC) at Elkins, West Virginia		
	19978	Southern Pacific 5623	April 1955	GP9R	April 15, 1977	SP's Sacramento shops	Southern Pacific Transportation Company (SP)	1991	Operational at the Niles Canyon Railway in Sunol, California	"torpedo boat" version	
	22897	Southern Pacific 2873	December 1956	GP9R	February 18, 1977	SP's Sacramento shops	Texas and New Orleans Railroad (T&NO); Southern Pacific Transportation Company (SP)	April 1991	Undergoing repairs at the Western Pacific Railroad Museum in Portola, California		
	22915	Southern Pacific 3769	January 1957	GP9E	September 1974	SP's Sacramento shops	Southern Pacific Transportation Company (SP)	May 28, 1986	On static display at the Utah State Railroad Museum in Ogden, Utah	Donated on July 23, 1987	
	23328	Pennsylvania Railroad 7580	June 1957	GP10	-	IC's Paducah, Kentucky shops	Pennsylvania Railroad (PRR); Penn Central (PC); Conrail (CR); Rail Tours (RTI); Big Dog Lines (BDLX); Clinton Terminal Railroad (CTR)	-	Operational at the Colebrookdale Railroad in Boyertown, Pennsylvania	PRR Class EFS-17M	
	24288	Pennsylvania Railroad 7236	October 1959	GP10	-	IC's Paducah, Kentucky shops	Pennsylvania Railroad (PRR); Penn Central (PC); Conrail (CR); Juniata Terminal Company, Inc. (JTFS); Mobile Locomotive Services. Inc. (MLSX); Midwest Rail (MR)	-	Operational at the Colebrookdale Railroad in Boyertown, Pennsylvania		
	25020	Southern Pacific 3873	February 1959	GP9R	July 1977	SP's Sacramento shops	St. Louis Southwestern Railway (SSW); Southern Pacific Transportation Company (SP)	May 21, 1996	Operational at the Pacific Southwest Railway Museum in Campo, California		
	25150	Hoosier Southern 465	February 1959	GP9E	December 1976	SP's Sacramento shops	Texas and New Orleans Railroad (T&NO); Southern Pacific Transportation Company (SP); Hoosier Southern Railway (HOS)	September 18, 1995	Operational at the Indiana Railroad Museum in French Lick, Indiana		
	25152	Albany and Eastern 1750	February 1959	GP9R	January 9, 1978	SP's Sacramento shops	Texas and New Orleans Railroad (T&NO); Southern Pacific Transportation Company (SP); Willamette Valley Railway (WVR)	February 20, 1991	Operational at the Albany and Eastern Railroad in Lebanon, Oregon		

== EMD-built (low hood; GP9) ==
Photograph	Serial no.	Locomotive	Build date	Former operators	Retire date	Disposition	Notes	References
	19548	Western Maryland 25	May 1954	Western Maryland Railway (WM); Great Walton Railroad (GWRR)	-	Awaiting restoration near Barton, Maryland, Owned by the Western Maryland Scenic Railroad		
	20644	Leadville, Colorado and Southern 1714	August 1955	Northern Pacific Railway (NP); Burlington Northern Railroad (BN)	-	Operational at the Leadville, Colorado and Southern Railroad in Leadville, Colorado		
	22053	California Western 66	November 1956	Chesapeake and Ohio Railway (C&O); Chessie System (B&O); Buffalo and Pittsburgh Railroad (B&P); Golden Spike Rail Services (GSRX)	-	Operational at the California Western Railroad, Mendocino County, California		
	22736	Leadville, Colorado and Southern 1918	August 1957	Northern Pacific Railway (NP); Burlington Northern Railroad (BN)	-	Operational at the Leadville, Colorado and Southern Railroad in Leadville, Colorado		
	22774	Leadville, Colorado and Southern 1729	February 1957	Northern Pacific Railway (NP); Burlington Northern Railroad (BN); Montana Rail Link (MRL)	-	Operational at the Leadville, Colorado and Southern Railroad in Leadville, Colorado		
	23270	Western Maryland 39	April 1957	Western Maryland Railway (WM); Gettysburg Railroad (GETY); Knox and Kane Railroad (KKRR); Georges Creek Railway (GCK)	-	Awaiting restoration near Barton, Maryland, Owned by the Western Maryland Scenic Railroad		
	23369	Mount Hood Railroad 4101	June 1957	Chesapeake and Ohio Railway (C&O); Kiamichi Railroad (KRR); Rio Valley Switching Company (RVSC); S&S Sales and Leasing (SSRX)	-	Operational at the Mount Hood Railroad in Hood River, Oregon		
	25301	Leadville, Colorado and Southern 1889	May 1959	Milwaukee Road (MILW); Minnesota Valley (MNVA); Mount Hood Railroad (MHRR); Leadville Colorado & southern Railroad	-	Operational at the Leadville, Colorado and Southern Railroad in Leadville, Colorado		
	25632	Southern Pacific 3709	August 1959	Southern Pacific Transportation Company (SP); U.S. Army Transportation School (USATS); Department of Transportation (DOT); United States Marine Corps (USMC)	December 1986	Operational at the Pacific Southwest Railway Museum in Campo, California		

== EMD-built (low hood; rebuilt GP9) ==
Photograph	Serial no.	Locomotive	Build date	Model	Rebuild date	Rebuilder	Former operators	Retire date	Disposition and location	Notes	References
	19968	Great Smoky Mountains 1751	May 1955	GP9E	May 14, 1970	SP's Sacramento shops	Texas and New Orleans Railroad (T&NO); Southern Pacific Railroad (SP); Kyle Railroad (KYLE); San Joaquin Valley Railroad (SJVR)	1986	Operational at the Great Smoky Mountains Railroad in Bryson City, North Carolina		
	19997	California Western 65	October 1954	GP9R	January 1975	SP's Sacramento shops	Southern Pacific Railroad (SP); Kyle Railroad (KYLE)	1986	Operational at the California Western Railroad in Mendocino County, California		
	20132	California Western 64	January 1955	GP9R	May 11, 1970	SP's Sacramento shops	Southern Pacific Railroad (SP); Kyle Railroad (KYLE)	-	Operational at the California Western Railroad in Mendocino County, California		
	20971	Blue Ridge Scenic 7529	February 1956	GP10	1978	Illinois Central Railroad's Paducah shops	New York Central Railroad (NYC); Penn Central Transportation Company (PC); Conrail (CR); Georgia Northeastern Railroad (GNRR)		Operational at the Blue Ridge Scenic Railway in Blue Ridge, Georgia		
	21359	Great Smoky Mountains 1755	April 1956	GP9E	February 1974	SP's Sacramento shops	Southern Pacific Railroad (SP); Arizona Eastern Railway (AZER); San Joaquin Valley Railroad (SJVR)	-	Operational at the Great Smoky Mountains Railroad in Bryson City, North Carolina		
	21572	Bountiful Grain and Craig Mountain 1639	May 1956	GP9u	April 25, 1978	AT&SF's Cleburne Texas shops	Atchison, Topeka and Santa Fe Railway (AT&SF); Burlington Northern and Santa Fe Railway (BNSF); Bountiful Grain and Craig Mountain Railroad (BG&CM); Washington and Idaho Railway (WIR)	-	Operational at the Mount Hood Railroad in Hood River, Oregon		
	23807	Hocking Valley Scenic 701	December 1957	GP10	January 1974	Illinois Central Railroad's Paducah shops	Illinois Central Railroad (IC); Illinois Central Gulf Railroad (ICG); MidSouth Rail Corporation (MSRC); Southern Pacific Construction Services (SPCX)	-	Operational at the Hocking Valley Scenic Railway in Nelsonville, Ohio		
	24970	Blue Ridge Scenic 4631	November 1958	GP9R	1992	GTW's Battle Creek Shops	Grand Trunk Western Railroad (GTW); Progress Rail (PRLX); Georgia Northeastern Railroad (GNRR)	-	Operational at the Blue Ridge Scenic Railway in Blue Ridge, Georgia		
	25038	Illinois Central 8733	December 1958	GP11	March 1980	Illinois Central Railroad's Paducah shops	Illinois Central Railroad (IC); Illinois Central Gulf Railroad (ICG); Canadian National Railway (CN)	2001	Operational at the Monticello Railway Museum in Monticello, Illinois		
	23830	Big South Fork Scenic 107	December 1957	GP11	August 1979	Illinois Central Railroad's Paducah shops	Illinois Central Railroad (IC); Illinois Central Gulf Railroad (ICG); South Central Florida Express, Inc. (SCFE); U.S. Sugar Corporation (USSC); Railexco (RXCX)	-	Operational at the Big South Fork Scenic Railway in Stearns, Kentucky		

== GMD-built (high hood; GP9) ==
Photograph	Serial no.	Locomotive	Build date	Model	Former operators	Retire date	Disposition and location	Notes	References
	A1083	APXX 7438	April 1957	GP9	New York Central Railroad (NYC); Penn Central (PC); Conrail (CR); RailAmerica Central Western Railway Corporation (CWRL)	-	Operational at the Alberta Prairie Railway Excursions (APXX) at Stettler, Alberta		
	A1091	BNSF 1685	March 1957	GP9	Burlington Northern (Manitoba) Limited (BN); BNSF Railway (BNSF)	-	Operational at the Prairie Dog Central Railway, Winnipeg, Manitoba	"torpedo boat" version	

== GMD-built (low hood; rebuilt GP9) ==
Photograph	Serial no.	Locomotive	Build date	Model	Rebuild date	Rebuilder	Former operators	Retire date	Disposition and location	Notes	References
	A714	Canadian Pacific 8250	December 1954	GP9u	1984	CP's Ogden Shops	Canadian Pacific Railway (CP); Larry's Truck and Electric (LTEX)	April 28, 2015	Operational at the Potomac Eagle Scenic Railroad in Romney, West Virginia		
	A1134	Pennsylvania Northeastern 8218	August 1957	GP9u	1988	CP's Ogden Shops	Canadian Pacific Railway (CP); Pennsylvania Northeastern Railroad (PN)	April 28, 2015	Operational at the New Hope Railroad in New Hope, Pennsylvania		
	A1297	Canadian National 4019	November 1957	GP9RM	December 1982	CN's Pointe St. Charles Shops	Canadian National Railway (CN); British Columbia Institute of Technology (BCIT)	2005	Donated to the Alberta Railway Museum (ARM) in Edmonton, Alberta		
	A1664	AMT 1311	March 1959	GP9RM	March 1990	CN's Pointe St. Charles Shops	Canadian National Railway (CN); Agence métropolitaine de transport (AMT)	February 14, 2011	On static display at the Canadian Railway Museum in Saint-Constant, Quebec		
	A1721	Black River and Western 1888	July 1959	GP9u	1988	CP's Ogden Shops	Canadian Pacific Railway (CP); J&L Consulting Ltd. (JLCX)	September 2015	Operational at the Black River and Western Railroad (BR&W) in East Amwell Township, New Jersey		

== Formerly preserved, scrapped ==
=== EMD-built high hood (GP9) ===
Photograph	Serial no.	Locomotive	Build date	Former operators	Retire date	Last seen	Scrap date	Cause of scrapping	Notes	References
	21888	Conway Scenic 1757	November 1956	Pennsylvania Railroad (PRR); Penn Central Transportation Company (PC); Conrail (CR); New Hampshire Northcoast Railroad (NHN)	-	Conway Scenic Railroad in North Conway, New Hampshire	March 1, 2022	Used as parts donor		
	22019	Chesapeake and Ohio 6661	September 1956	Chesapeake and Ohio Railway (C&O); Baltimore and Ohio Railroad (B&O); Atlanta, Stone Mountain and Lithonia Railway (ASML)	July 1986	Stone Mountain Scenic Railroad in Stone Mountain, Georgia	2011	-		

=== EMD-built high hood (rebuilt GP9) ===
Photograph	Serial no.	Locomotive	Build date	Model	Rebuild date	Rebuilder	Former operators	Retire date	Last seen	Scrap date	Cause of scrapping	Notes	References
	22900	Port of Tillamook Bay 3771	December 1956	GP9E	December 1974	SP's Sacramento shops	Southern Pacific Transportation Company (SP); Port of Tillamook Bay Railroad (POTB)	1985	Tillamook Air Museum in Tillamook, Oregon	2010	Shutdown of the POTB from a storm in 2007		

=== EMD-built low hood (rebuilt GP9) ===
Photograph	Serial no.	Locomotive	Build date	Model	Rebuild date	Rebuilder	Former operators	Retire date	Last seen	Scrap date	Cause of scrapping	Notes	References
	19104	Great Smoky Mountains 711	July 1957	GP9R	May 2, 1977	C&NW's Oelwein, Iowa shops	Union Pacific Railroad (UP); Chicago and North Western Transportation Company (C&NW); Railway Equipment Leasing Company (RELX)	September 1976 (UP); December 20, 1989 (C&NW); December 2022 (GSMR)	A field in Whittier, North Carolina	2022	Destroyed in staged train wreck by MrBeast		
	19874	Great Smoky Mountains 777	September 1954	GP9R	May 24, 1977	C&NW's Oelwein, Iowa shops	Union Pacific Railroad (UP); Chicago and North Western Transportation Company (C&NW); Railway Equipment Leasing Company (RELX)	September 1976 (UP); December 20, 1989 (C&NW); December 2022 (GSMR)	Great Smoky Mountains Railroad in Bryson City, North Carolina	2022	Destroyed in staged train wreck by MrBeast		
