= Mahoning Valley Railway =

Overview
- Parent company: Genesee and Wyoming
- Headquarters: Youngstown, Ohio
- Reporting mark: MVRY
- Locale: Ohio

Technical
- Track gauge: 4 ft 8 1/2 in (1,435 mm) standard gauge
- Length: 56 miles (90 km)

Other
- Website: Official website

Mahoning Valley Railway (MVRY) is a short-line railroad in Mahoning County, Ohio, United States, owned by Genesee & Wyoming Inc. It has an interchange with Norfolk Southern Railway at its east end. The west end is Youngstown Belt Railroad which is also owned by Genesee & Wyoming. This services Youngstown, Ohio area for its steel mills. The line connects Struthers, Ohio with Youngstown.

The company was acquired by Genesee & Wyoming in 2008 as part of its purchase of the Ohio Central Railroad System.

In March 2020, MVRY purchased Ohi-Rail Corporation's lines in Eastern Ohio and also took over the lease of the lines which Ohi-Rail used to lease from the State of Ohio, thereby taking over all of Ohi-Rail's freight operations.

As of 2024, it operates 56 miles (90 km) of rail, all in Ohio. It interchanges with several railroads:

- Columbus and Ohio River Railroad at Hopedale, OH
- CSX at Ohio Junction, OH
- Norfolk Southern at Struthers and Bayard, OH
- Wheeling & Lake Erie Railway at Minerva Junction, OH
- Youngstown Belt Railroad at Youngstown, OH
- Youngstown and Southeastern Railroad at Youngstown, OH
