= CQPA =

CQPA may refer to:

- Central Columbiana and Pennsylvania Railway reporting mark
- Certified Quality Process Analyst, an American Society for Quality (ASQ) certification
