= Ohio and Pennsylvania Railroad =

Ohio and Pennsylvania Railroad may refer to:

- Ohio and Pennsylvania Railroad (1848–1856), later part of the Pennsylvania Railroad
- Ohio and Pennsylvania Railroad (1995–present), a short line in northeast Ohio
