= List of preserved EMD GP7 locomotives =

This is a summary, listing every EMD GP7 locomotive in preservation.

== EMD-built (high hood; GP7) ==
Photograph	Serial no.	Locomotive	Build date	Model	Former operators	Retire date	Disposition and location	Notes	References
	10133	Chesapeake and Ohio 5704	June 1950	GP7	Chesapeake and Ohio Railway (C&O); Indiana and Ohio Railway (IORY)	-	Operational at the Lebanon Mason and Monroe Railroad in Lebanon, Ohio		
	10217	Atlantic Coast Line 100	May 1950	GP7	Atlantic Coast Line Railroad (ACL); Seaboard Coast Line Railroad (SCL)	-	Operational at the Conrad Yelvington Distributors in Gainesville, Florida		
	10551	Nashville, Chattanooga and St. Louis 710	September 1950	GP7	Nashville, Chattanooga and St. Louis Railway	-	Operational at the Tennessee Valley Railroad Museum in Chattanooga, Tennessee		
	12001	Georgia Railroad 1026	October 1950	GP7	Georgia Railroad and Banking Company	-	Operational at the Southeastern Railway Museum in Duluth, Georgia		
	12369	Maine Central 573	September 1950	GP7	Maine Central Railroad; Springfield Terminal	1995	Operational at the Conway Scenic Railroad in New Hampshire		
	12391	Louisville and Nashville 405	April 1951	GP7	Louisville and Nashville Railroad (L&N)	-	Operational at the Tennessee Central Railway Museum in Nashville, Tennessee		
	13511	Richmond, Fredericksburg and Potomac 101	December 1950	GP7	Richmond, Fredericksburg and Potomac Railroad (RFP)	-	Operational, owned by the Old Dominion Chapter NRHS		
	14572	Aberdeen and Rockfish 205	September 1951	GP7	Aberdeen and Rockfish Railroad (A&R)	-	Operational at the North Carolina Transportation Museum in Spencer, North Carolina	Last GP7 continuously operated by original owner, never rebuilt.	
	15182	Soo Line 559	October 1951	GP7	Soo Line Railroad (SOO); Chicago, Rock Island and Pacific Railroad (CRI&P)	1998	Operational at the Minnesota Transportation Museum in Saint Paul, Minnesota		
	15692	United States Army 1822	August 1951	GP7	Sunny Point Military Ocean Terminal	-	Stored at the Florida Railroad Museum in Parrish, Florida		
	15694	United States Army 1824	August 1951	GP7L	Tennessee Valley Railroad	-	Stored at the Tennessee Valley Railroad Museum in Chattanooga, Tennessee		
	15699	United States Army 1829	August 1951	GP7L	Tennessee Valley Railroad	-	Stored at the Tennessee Valley Railroad Museum in Chattanooga, Tennessee		
	15705	United States Army 1835	August 1951	GP7	Sunny Point Military Ocean Terminal	-	Operational at the Florida Railroad Museum in Parrish, Florida		
	17029	Western Pacific 705	October 1952	GP7	Western Pacific Railroad (WP)	March 18, 1985	On static display at the Western Pacific Railroad Museum in Portola, California		
	17031	Western Pacific 707	October 1952	GP7	Western Pacific Railroad (WP)	March 18, 1985	Operational at the Western Pacific Railroad Museum in Portola, California		
	17049	Chesapeake and Ohio 5828	November 1952	GP7	Chesapeake and Ohio Railway (C&O)	-	On static display at the C&O Railway Heritage Center in Clifton Forge, Virginia		
	17056	Western Pacific 708	October 1952	GP7	Western Pacific Railroad (WP)	August 1, 1984	On static display at the Western Pacific Railroad Museum in Portola, California		
	17101	Central Railroad of New Jersey 1523	November 1952	GP7	Central Railroad of New Jersey (CNJ); Conrail (CR); New Jersey Department of Transportation (NJDOT); NJ Transit (NJT)	-	On static display at the United Railroad Historical Society of New Jersey in Boonton, New Jersey		
	17102	Central Railroad of New Jersey 1524	November 1952	GP7	Central Railroad of New Jersey (CNJ); Conrail (CR); New Jersey Department of Transportation (NJDOT); NJ Transit (NJT)	-	On static display at the United Railroad Historical Society of New Jersey in Boonton, New Jersey		
	17239	Louisville and Nashville 411	September 1952	GP7	Louisville and Nashville Railroad (L&N)	-	Operational at the Kentucky Railway Museum in New Haven, Kentucky		
	17280	Chesapeake and Ohio 5833	October 1952	GP7	Chesapeake and Ohio Railway (C&O); Chicago South Shore and South Bend Railroad	-	Owned by the Hocking Valley Scenic Railway in Nelsonville, Ohio		
	17982	Pittsburgh and Lake Erie 1501	April 28, 1953	GP7	Pittsburgh and Lake Erie Railroad (P&LE); Youngstown and Austintown Railroad (YA); Ohio Central Railroad (OHCR)	-	Owned by the Age of Steam Roundhouse in Sugarcreek, Ohio		
	18075	Chesapeake and Ohio 5896	April 1953	GP7	Chesapeake and Ohio Railway (C&O)	-	Operational at the Stone Mountain Scenic Railroad in Stone Mountain, Georgia		
	18168	Sacramento Northern 712	April 1953	GP7	Western Pacific Railroad (WP); Sacramento Northern Railway (SN)	March 18, 1985	On static display at the Western Pacific Railroad Museum in Portola, California		
	18169	Western Pacific 713	April 1953	GP7	Western Pacific Railroad (WP)	October 26, 1983	Operational at the Niles Canyon Railway in Sunol, California		
	18707	Illinois Terminal 1605	August 1953	GP7	Illinois Terminal Railroad (IT); Norfolk and Western Railway (N&W)	April 9, 1984	Operational at the Illinois Railway Museum in Union, Illinois		

== EMD-built (high hood; rebuilt GP7) ==
Photograph	Serial no.	Locomotive	Build date	Model	Rebuild date	Rebuilder	Former operators	Retire date	Disposition and location	Notes	References
	10852	Chicago and North Western 1518	October 1949	GP7R	October 1972	C&NW's Oelwein, Iowa shops	Chicago and North Western Transportation Company (C&NW)	August 11, 1986	Operational at the Illinois Railway Museum in Union, Illinois	EMD demonstrator unit	
	17597	Rock Island 4506	October 1952	GP7R	February 23, 1976	C&NW's Oelwein, Iowa shops	Chicago, Rock Island and Pacific Railroad (CRI&P); Chicago and North Western Transportation Company (C&NW); Union Pacific Railroad (UP)	April 3, 1998	Operational at the Illinois Railway Museum in Union, Illinois		

== EMD-built (low hood; GP7) ==
Photograph	Serial no.	Locomotive	Build date	Former operators	Retire date	Disposition and location	Notes	References
	11690	Plymouth and Lincoln 302	August 1950	Chicago, Rock Island and Pacific Railroad (CRIP); New England Southern Railroad (NEGS)	-	Operational at the Plymouth & Lincoln Railroad in Lincoln, New Hampshire		
	13552	Colorado and Wyoming 102	March 1951	Colorado and Wyoming Railway (CW)	-	Operational at the Pueblo Railway Museum in Pueblo, Colorado		
	15704	Atlantic Coast Line 1804	August 1951	United States Army (USAX); Alaska Railroad (ARR)	-	Under restoration at the Gold Coast Railroad Museum in Miami, Florida		
	15746	Colorado and Wyoming 103	December 1951	Colorado and Wyoming Railway (CW)	-	Operational at the Pueblo Railway Museum in Pueblo, Colorado		
	15747	Colorado and Wyoming 104	December 1951	Colorado and Wyoming Railway (CW)	-	Operational at the Pueblo Railway Museum in Pueblo, Colorado		
	15943	Cape Cod Central 1501	January 1952	Bay Line Railroad (ASAB); South Central Florida Express (SCFE)	-	Operational at the Cape Cod Central Railroad (CCCR) in Cape Cod, Massachusetts		

== EMD-built (low hood; rebuilt GP7) ==
Photograph	Serial no.	Locomotive	Build date	Model	Rebuild date	Rebuilder	Former operators	Retire date	Disposition and location	Notes	References
	13162	Burlington Junction Railway 714	October 1950	GP7u		AT&SF's Cleburne Texas shops	Atchison, Topeka and Santa Fe Railway (ATSF); Great Western Railway (GWR); Council Bluffs Railway (CBGR); Burlington Junction Railway (BJRY)	-	On static display at Ottumwa, Iowa		
	14409	BUGX 804	July 1951	GP8	February 3, 1975	ICG's Paducah, Kentucky shops	Wabash Railroad (WAB); Norfolk and Western Railway (N&W); Precision National Corporation (PNC); Illinois Central Gulf Railroad (ICG); Pioneer Rail Equipment Company (PREX); Garden City Western Railway (GCW); Dieselmotive Company, Inc. (BUGX)	January 13, 1973 (N&W); 1990 (ICG)	Operational at the Louisiana Steam Train Association (LASTA) in Jefferson, Louisiana		
	16383	Santa Fe 2185	August 1952	GP7u		AT&SF's Cleburne Texas shops	Atchison, Topeka and Santa Fe Railway (ATSF); Georgia Southwestern Railroad (GSWR); Virginia Southern Railroad (VSRR)	-	On static display at the Crewe Railroad Museum in Crewe, Virginia	Displayed in Norfolk and Western lettering.	
	16388	Santa Fe Southern 07	August 1952	GP7u		AT&SF's Cleburne Texas shops	Atchison, Topeka and Santa Fe Railway (ATSF); Texas - New Mexico Railroad (TNMR); Dallas, Garland and Northeastern Railroad (DGNO); West Texas and Lubbock Railway (WTLC)	-	Operational at the Sky Railway in Santa Fe, New Mexico		
	16391	Grand Canyon 1105	August 1952	GP7u		AT&SF's Cleburne Texas shops	Atchison, Topeka, and Santa Fe Railroad (AT&SF)	-	Operational at the Grand Canyon Railway (GCRY) in Williams, Arizona		
	17015	Grapevine Vintage 2199	March 1953	GP7u		AT&SF's Cleburne Texas shops	Atchison, Topeka and Santa Fe Railway (AT&SF); Central Kansas Railway (CKRY)	-	Operational at the Grapevine Vintage Railroad (GVRR) in Grapevine, Texas	Nicknamed "Vinny" by the Grapevine Vintage.	
	17242	Santa Fe Southern 93	September 1952	GP16	October 1982	-	Louisville and Nashville Railroad (LN); Seaboard System (SBD); CSX Transportation (CSXT)	July 23, 1992	Operational at the Sky Railway in Santa Fe, New Mexico		
	17382	French Lick Scenic 1813	September 1952	GP16	September 1981	-	Seaboard Air Line Railroad (SAL); Seaboard Coast Line Railroad (SCL); Seaboard System (SBD); CSX Transportation (CSXT)	February 18, 1993	Operational at the Indiana Railway Museum in French Lick, Indiana		
	18410	Illinois Central Gulf 7738	May 1953	GP8	August 1975	ICG's Paducah, Kentucky shops	Reading Company (RDG); Illinois Central Gulf Railroad (ICG); Mississippi Delta Railroad (MSDR); Lexington and Ohio Railroad (LXOH)	-	Operational at the Bluegrass Railroad Museum (BGRM) in Versailles, Kentucky		
	18898	Grand Canyon 2134	November 1953	GP7u		AT&SF's Cleburne Texas shops	Atchison, Topeka, and Santa Fe Railroad (AT&SF)	-	Stored at the Grand Canyon Railway (GCRY) in Williams, Arizona		

== GMD-built (low hood; GP7) ==
Photograph	Serial no.	Locomotive	Build date	Former operators	Retire date	Disposition and location	Notes	References
	A537	Canadian National 4803	August 1953	Canadian National Railway (CN)	-	Operational at the Toronto Railway Museum in Toronto, Ontario		

== Formerly preserved, scrapped ==
=== EMD-built low hood (GP7) ===
Photograph	Serial no.	Locomotive	Build date	Former operators	Retire date	Last seen at	Scrap date	Cause of scrapping	Notes	References
	15635	Oregon Eastern 1608	January 1952	Toledo, Peoria and Western Railway (TP&W); Michigan Northern Railway (MIGN); Wyoming and Colorado Railroad (WYCO); Oregon Eastern Railroad (OERR)	-	OERR in Vale, Oregon	February 2022	Cannibalized as a parts source, traded to Western Rail, Inc. (WRIX) in exchange for WRIX GP39-3 3600		

=== EMD-built low hood (rebuilt GP7) ===
Photograph	Serial no.	Locomotive	Build date	Model	Rebuild date	Rebuilder	Former operators	Retire date	Last seen at	Scrap date	Cause of scrapping	Notes	References
	13164	Oregon Eastern 2071	October 1950	GP7u	October 1979	AT&SF's Cleburne Texas shops	Atchison, Topeka and Santa Fe Railway (AT&SF); Southwestern Railroad (SW); Wyoming and Colorado Railroad (WYCO); Oregon Eastern Railroad (OERR)	-	OERR in Vale, Oregon	February 2022	Cannibalized as a parts source		
	18905	Oregon Eastern 2072	January 1952	GP7u	June 17, 1974	AT&SF's Cleburne Texas shops	Atchison, Topeka and Santa Fe Railway (AT&SF); Grand Canyon Railway (GCRY); Southwestern Railroad (SW); Wyoming and Colorado Railroad (WYCO); Oregon Eastern Railroad (OERR)	-	OERR in Vale, Oregon	February 2022	Cannibalized as a parts source		
