= Vermilion Valley Railroad =

Railway line in Indiana and Illinois

Overview
- Headquarters: Connersville, Indiana
- Reporting mark: VVRR
- Locale: Western Indiana, eastern Illinois
- Dates of operation: 2003–

Technical
- Track gauge: 4 ft 8 1/2 in (1,435 mm) standard gauge

The Vermilion Valley Railroad (reporting mark VVRR) is a 5.9-mile (9.5 km) short-line railroad that operates across the Indiana-Illinois state line, connecting the Flex-N-Gate Corporation facility west of Covington, Indiana with CSX Transportation in Danville, Illinois.

Operations by the VVRR began in 2003 after CSX abandoned the ex-New York Central Railroad line. On May 12, 2023, VVRR was acquired by Gulf & Atlantic Railways.

== History ==
The line was completed in 1869 by the Indianapolis, Crawfordsville and Danville Railroad, and later became part of the Pekin-Indianapolis line of the Peoria and Eastern Railway, a New York Central Railroad subsidiary.

Successor Conrail abandoned the portion between Olin and Crawfordsville by 1985, and in 1999 the remaining pieces were conveyed to New York Central Lines LLC for operation by CSX. CSX filed with the Surface Transportation Board for abandonment between Danville and Olin in 2001, since there had been no traffic for the past three years.

Flex-N-Gate Corporation is an Illinois-based auto parts manufacturer that has submitted an offer of financial assistance and bought the line through newly created FNG Logistics Corporation in December 2002. The Vermilion Valley Railroad began operating the line in April 2003.

After being run by Indiana Boxcar Corporation until 2019 and Midwest and Bluegrass until 2023, VVRR operations have transitioned to Gulf & Atlantic Railways.

== Locomotive roster ==
Locomotive model	Road no.
EMD GP9	1726
EMD GP9	5620
EMD GP9RM	4029
EMD F9A	4210 is Now owned by Smoky Mountain Rail Road as "The Polar Express".
EMD F9A	4214
EMD SDM	IBCX 809
EMD SDM	IBCX 811 & 813
EMD SD18	IBCX 616
