= Ohio Central Railroad System =

Rail network

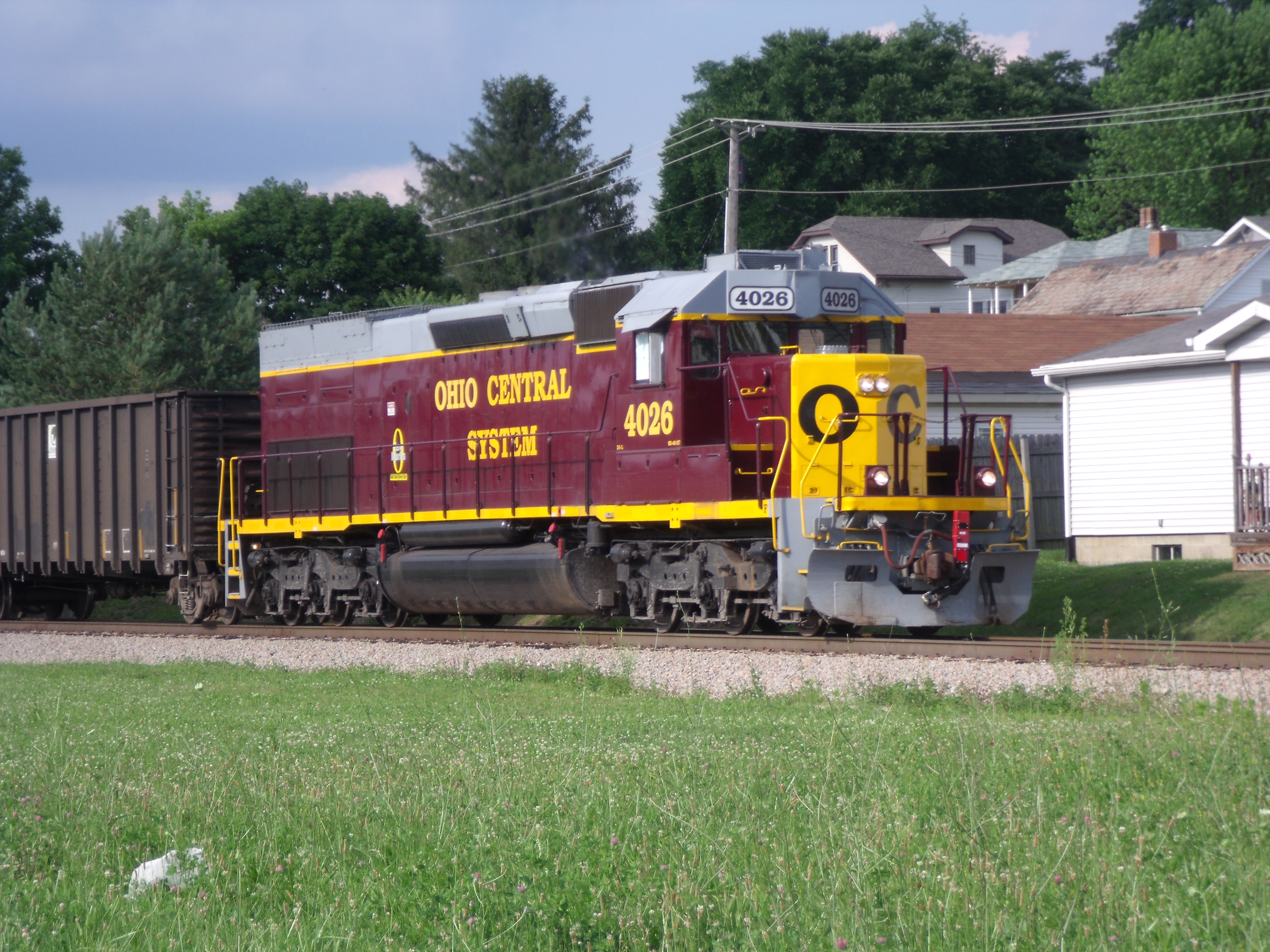
- An Ohio Central train in South Zanesville, Ohio

Overview
- Headquarters: Coshocton, Ohio
- Reporting mark: OHCR, OSRR, CUOH, MVRY, OHPA, WTRM, YARR, YB, POHC, AOR
- Locale: Ohio, Pennsylvania
- Dates of operation: 1988–present

Technical
- Track gauge: 4 ft 8 1/2 in (1,435 mm) standard gauge
- Length: 500 miles (800 km)

Other
- Website: www.gwrr.com/ohcr/

The Ohio Central Railroad System (reporting mark OHCR) is a network of ten short line railroads operating in Ohio and western Pennsylvania. It is owned by Genesee & Wyoming.

Headquartered in Coshocton, Ohio, the system operates 500 miles (800 km) of track divided among 10 subsidiary railroads. Most of the system's routes were divested from Class I railroads and connect industries to the Class I railroads.

The Ohio Central operates on track owned by other entities, including a line from Newark, Ohio to Mount Vernon, Ohio owned by CSX and the old Panhandle Route, owned by the State of Ohio.

== Railroads in the system ==
Ohio Central's rail system comprises

- Ohio Central Railroad
- Ohio Southern Railroad
- Columbus and Ohio River Rail Road, the former Pennsylvania Railroad Panhandle Route
- Mahoning Valley Railway
- Ohio & Pennsylvania Railroad
- Ohi-Rail Corporation
- Warren & Trumbull Railroad
- Youngstown & Austintown Railroad
- Youngstown Belt Railroad
- Pittsburgh & Ohio Central Railroad (Note: Formerly the Pittsburgh Industrial Railroad, a 42-mile (68 km) line from Arden to Neville Island, Pennsylvania. The Ohio Central purchased this line from RailAmerica, in December 2000 for $7.7 million. In 2005, the State of Pennsylvania awarded $2.1 million to repair flood damage along this line.)
- Aliquippa & Ohio River Railroad

== Steam operations ==
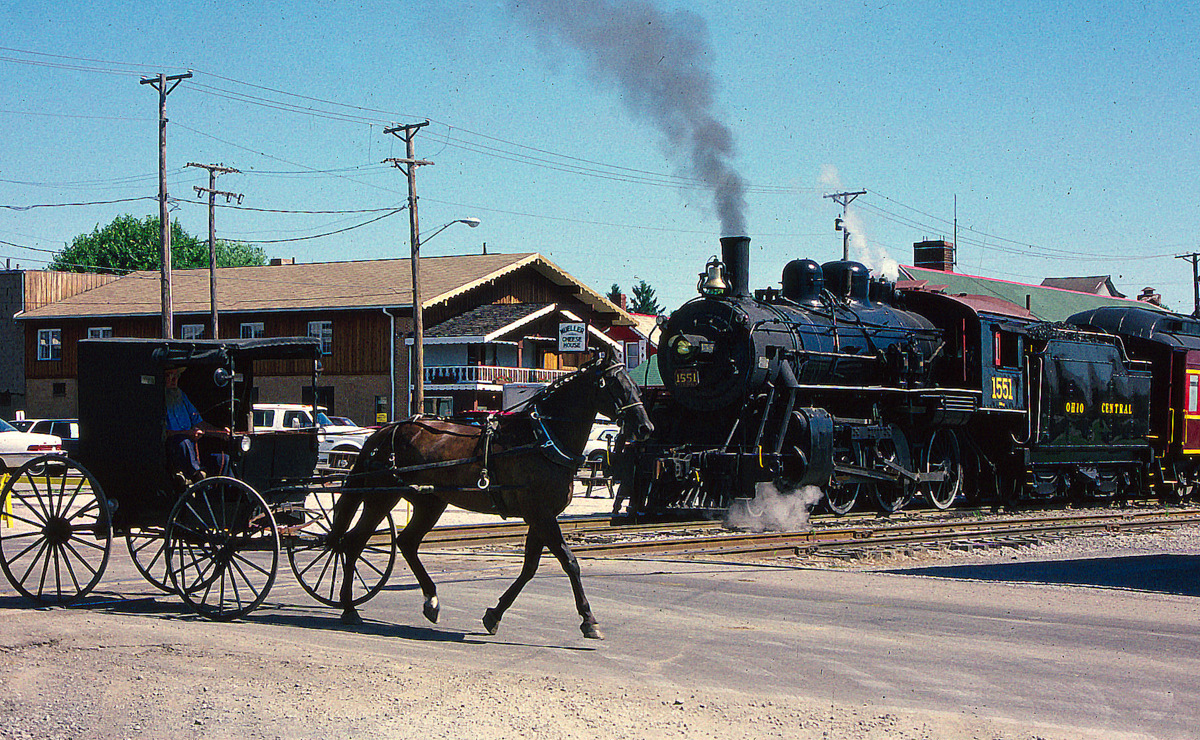
No. 1551 awaiting at the depot on the Ohio Central Railroad, July 1993

As well as being a regular revenue railroad, the Ohio Central had its own steam department that operated steam locomotives for tourist trains, excursions, and special events. When owner Jerry Joe Jacobson sold OHCR in 2008, he retained ownership of the antique equipment, including the collection of steam locomotives. He built the Age of Steam Roundhouse in Sugarcreek, Ohio, to house the equipment. Jacobson died in 2017 at the age of 74.

The collection includes the following:

- Canadian National 1551
- Buffalo Creek & Gauley Railroad 13
- Grand Trunk Western 6325
- Southern Wood Preserving Company 3
- Canadian Pacific 1293
- Lake Superior and Ishpeming 33
- Canadian National 96
- Canadian Pacific 1278
- Nickel Plate Road 763
- Baldwin Locomotive Works 26, was traded for Canadian National 1551 in 1986 to Steamtown.
- Reading 2100, sold in 1998 to Tom Payne, and it was moved to St. Thomas, Ontario.
- Mississippian Railway 76, sold in 2005 to the Steam Railroading Institute of Owosso, Michigan.

== Acquisition by Genesee and Wyoming ==
On August 5, 2008, Genesee & Wyoming announced an agreement to purchase the Ohio Central System for $219 million. Approval was granted by the Surface Transportation Board on December 30, 2008.
