= Warren and Trumbull Railroad =

Railway line in Ohio

Overview
- Headquarters: Youngstown, Ohio
- Reporting mark: WTRM
- Locale: Ohio
- Dates of operation: 1994–

Technical
- Track gauge: 4 ft 8 1/2 in (1,435 mm) standard gauge

The Warren and Trumbull Railroad (reporting mark WTRM) is a part of the Ohio Central Railroad System, which was bought by Genesee & Wyoming Inc. in 2008, operating three lines in and near Warren. It began operations in 1994 on a line formerly operated by CSX Transportation, and expanded in 1996 on two ex-Conrail lines.

All WTRM-operated lines are owned by the nonprofit Economic Development Rail II Corporation (EDR-II). The WTRM however owns several lines that are leased to the affiliated Youngstown Belt Railroad.

As of 2023, Genesee & Wyoming owns 4 miles of the Warren and Trumbull Railroad, and can hold up to 286,000 pounds of supplies. It also interchanges with Norfolk Southern and the Youngstown Belt Railroad in Warren, Ohio.

== History ==
The first line of the WTRM extended from a CSX connection at Deforest Junction, near Deforest Road, through Warren to the Warren Steel plant. The Interstate Commerce Commission approved abandonment by CSX in 1993, after which the Mahoning Valley Economic Development Corporation formed EDR-II to buy the ex-Baltimore and Ohio Railroad line, which had been built by the Painesville and Youngstown Railroad in the 1870s; the WTRM began operations in March 1994. EDR-II subsequently acquired two lines from Conrail in 1996, with operation by the WTRM under trackage rights. One line, extending north from a Conrail (now Youngstown Belt Railroad, with Norfolk Southern Railway trackage rights) connection in Warren, was opened in 1873 by the Ashtabula, Youngstown and Pittsburgh Railroad, a Pennsylvania Railroad predecessor, and the other, extending west from the same junction, and crossing the original line in Warren, was opened by the Atlantic and Great Western Railroad, an Erie Railroad predecessor, as part of a main line to Dayton in 1863. The original line (ex-B&O) south of the crossing with the new east–west line (ex-Erie) was abandoned the next year, since all traffic was overhead, and had moved to the new lines.

The WTRM bought outright a number of lines in 1996, and later that year leased a connecting ex-B&O line near Youngstown from CSX. Effective January 1, 1997, the Youngstown Belt Railroad began operating this trackage under lease.
