= List of preserved EMD SD9 locomotives =

This is a summary, listing every EMD SD9 locomotive in preservation around the world. All are listed by serial number.

== Currently preserved in Korea ==
Works no.	Locomotive	Build date	Former operators	Retire date	Disposition and location	Notes	References
23901	Korail 5025	October 1957	Korail	1998	On static display at the Daejeon Railway Vehicle Maintenance Depot in Daejeon, South Korea		

== Currently preserved in the United States ==
=== SD9 ===
Photograph	Works no.	Locomotive	Build date	Former operators	Retire date	Disposition and location	Notes	References
	20448	Algiers, Winslow and Western Railway 205	April 1955	Central of Georgia Railway (CofG); Southern Railway (SOU); Algiers, Winslow and Western Railway (AWW)	-	Stored at the Tennessee Valley Railroad Museum in Chattanooga, Tennessee	Number is labelled as "206" instead of 205	
	20562	BNSF 1727	August 1955	Chicago, Burlington and Quincy Railroad (CB&Q); Burlington Northern Railroad (BN); Burlington Northern and Santa Fe Railway (BNSF)		On static display at the Brookfield Public Library in Brookfield, Missouri (coordinates: 39°47'08.4"N 93°04'25.5"W)		
	23105	South Branch Valley Railroad 181	February 1957	Duluth, Missabe and Iron Range Railway (DM&IR); Bessemer and Lake Erie Railroad (B&LE); Larry's Truck and Electric (LTEX)		Stored at the South Branch Valley Rail Road in Moorefield, West Virginia		
	23106	South Branch Valley Railroad 180	February 1957	Duluth, Missabe and Iron Range Railway (DM&IR); Bessemer and Lake Erie Railroad (B&LE); Larry's Truck and Electric (LTEX)		Stored at the South Branch Valley Rail Road in Moorefield, West Virginia		
	24100	Great Northern 598	May 1958	Great Northern Railway (GN); Burlington Northern Railroad (BN); Burlington Northern and Santa Fe Railway (BNSF)	July 2008	Undergoing restoration at the Inland Northwest Rail Museum at Reardan, Washington		
	24101	Great Northern 599	June 1958	Great Northern Railway (GN); Burlington Northern Railroad (BN); Burlington Northern and Santa Fe Railway (BNSF)	July 2008	Some spare parts used for GN 598 at the Inland Northwest Rail Museum at Reardan, Washington		
	25159	Burlington Northern 6234		April 1959: Colorado and Southern Railway (C&S); Burlington Northern Railroad (BN); Burlington Northern and Santa Fe Railway (BNSF)	2003	Operational at the Minnesota Transportation Museum in Saint Paul, Minnesota		

=== Rebuilt SD9 ===
Photograph	Works no.	Locomotive	Build date	Model	Rebuilt date	Rebuilder	Former operators	Retire date	Disposition and location	Notes	References
	18780	Milwaukee Road 532	February 1954	SD10	October 1975	MILW's West Milwaukee shops	Milwaukee Road (MILW); Soo Line Railroad (SOO)	2001	Operational at the Whitewater Valley Scenic Railroad (WVSR) in Connersville, Indiana		
	19340	BNSF 1550	February 1954	SD9-3	December 17, 1998	VMV Enterprises (VMVX)	Great Northern Railway (GN); Burlington Northern Railroad (BN); Burlington Northern and Santa Fe Railway (BNSF)	-	Operational at the Lake Superior Railroad Museum in Duluth, Minnesota		
	19442	Southern Pacific 4451	April 1954	SD9E	February 14, 1974	SP's Sacramento Shops	Southern Pacific Transportation Company (SP); Progress Rail	August 30, 1995	Stored in Schellville, California		
	19940	Southern Pacific 5399	February 1955	SD9E	January 12, 1973	SP's Sacramento Shops	Southern Pacific Transportation Company (SP); Willamette Valley Railway (WVR); Lavacot Locomotive Works (LLW)	1991	Operational at the Albany and Eastern Railroad (AERC) at Lebanon, Oregon		
	20204	Portland and Western 1854	April 1955	SD9E	December 19, 1977	SP's Sacramento Shops	Southern Pacific Transportation Company (SP); Willamette Valley Railroad (WVR); Lavacot Locomotive Works (LLW); Portland and Western Railroad (PNWR)	SP: February 1, 1990; PNWR: November 6, 2023 (1st); February 2024 (2nd)	Donated to the Oregon Rail Heritage Foundation in Portland, Oregon, currently stored in Lebanon, Oregon		
	20445	Black River and Western 9581	March 1955	SD9m	1992	NS' Roanoke Shops	Central of Georgia Railway (CofG); Southern Railway (SOU); Norfolk Southern Railway (NS)	2010	Operational at the Black River and Western Railroad in Ringoes, New Jersey		
	21293	Nevada Northern 250	February 1956	SD9E	June 15, 1977	SP's Sacramento Shops	Southern Pacific Transportation Company (SP); Progress Rail; BHP Nevada Railroad (BHP)	September 18, 1995	Operational the Nevada Northern Railway Museum in Ely, Nevada		
	21297	Southern Pacific 5472	March 1956	SD9E	May 27, 1977	SP's Sacramento Shops	Southern Pacific Transportation Company (SP); OmniTRAX (OMLX); Northwestern Pacific Railroad (NWP)	July 15, 1994	Operational at the Niles Canyon Railway (NCRY) in Sunol, California		
	23164	Norfolk and Western 2349	April 1957	SD9m	September 1990	NS' Roanoke Shops	Nickel Plate Road (NKP); Norfolk and Western Railway (N&W); Norfolk Southern Railway (NS)	March 22, 2010	On static display at the Mad River and NKP Railroad Museum in Bellevue, Ohio		
	23173	Nickel Plate Road 358	April 1957	SD9m	June 1991	NS' Roanoke Shops	Nickel Plate Road (NKP); Norfolk and Western Railway (N&W); Norfolk Southern Railway (NS)	March 22, 2010	Operational at the Fort Wayne Railroad Historical Society in New Haven, Indiana		
	25262	Duluth, Missabe and Iron Range 814	April 1959	SD-M	September 1990	DM&IR	Duluth, Missabe and Iron Range Railway (DM&IR); Elgin, Joliet and Eastern Railway (EJ&E); Indiana Boxcar Corporation (IBCX); Chesapeake and Indiana Railroad (C&I)	2009 (EJ&E); 2021 (C&I)	Operational at the Hoosier Valley Railroad Museum in North Judson, Indiana		
	25272	Elgin, Joliet and Eastern 818	April 1959	SD-M	November 1990	DM&IR	Duluth, Missabe and Iron Range Railway (DM&IR); Elgin, Joliet and Eastern Railway (EJ&E); Indiana Boxcar Corporation (IBCX); Chesapeake and Indiana Railroad (C&I)	2009 (EJ&E); 2021 (C&I)	Undergoing restoration at the Hoosier Valley Railroad Museum in North Judson, Indiana		

== Formerly preserved, scrapped ==
=== Korea ===
Works no.	Locomotive	Build date	Former operators	Retire date	Last seen	Scrap date	Notes	References
23500	Korail 5020	July 1957	Korail	1997	Busan Railway Vehicle Maintenance Group in Busanjin District, Busan, South Korea	2009		

=== United States (rebuilt SD9) ===
Photograph	Works no.	Locomotive	Build date	Model	Rebuild date	Rebuilder	Former operators	Retire date	Last seen	Scrap date	Cause of scrapping	Notes	References
	19443	Southern Pacific 4303	April 1954	SD9E	August 31, 1970	SP's Sacramento shops	Southern Pacific Transportation Company (SP); Progress Rail; BHP Nevada Railroad (BHP)	September 18, 1995	Stored at the Nevada Northern Railway Museum in Ely, Nevada	2011	Cannibalized for spare parts for NNRY #204 (now NNRY #250)		
	19452	Southern Pacific 4450	April 1954	SD9E	November 23, 1973	SP's Sacramento shops	Southern Pacific Transportation Company (SP); Union Pacific Railroad (UP)	March 26, 1997	Western Pacific Railroad Museum (WPRM) in Portola, California	August 20, 2013	Poor condition and lack of alignment control couplers.	Nicknamed "Huff"	
