= Indiana Boxcar Corporation =

Locomotive leasing company in Connersville, Indiana

The Indiana Boxcar Corporation (IBC), based in Connersville, Indiana, United States, provides services such as locomotive leasing to the rail industry. It also owned several short-line railroads which operated lines under contract for their owners:

- Chesapeake and Indiana Railroad under contract for the town of North Judson, Indiana (2004–2019)
- Ohi-Rail Corporation (managed by IBC, 2006–2020)
- Vermilion Valley Railroad under contract for the FNG Logistics Company (2003–2019)
- Youngstown and Southeastern Railroad under contract for the Eastern States Railroad (2006–2019)
- Camp Chase Railroad, Camp Chase Railway (“CAMY”) assumed operations of the 14-mile rail line, which runs from Columbus to Lilly Chapel, Ohio, beginning Thursday October 1, 2015. (2015–2019)
- Evansville Terminal Company (1997–2000)
- Tishomingo Railroad under contract for the Mississippi Department of Economic and Community Development (jointly owned with Vintage Locomotives, Inc., 2006–2009)

In 2019, four lines were transferred to the new Midwest and Bluegrass Rail holding.
