= Leadville, Colorado and Southern Railroad =

Tourist railroad in Colorado, United States

The Leadville Railroad
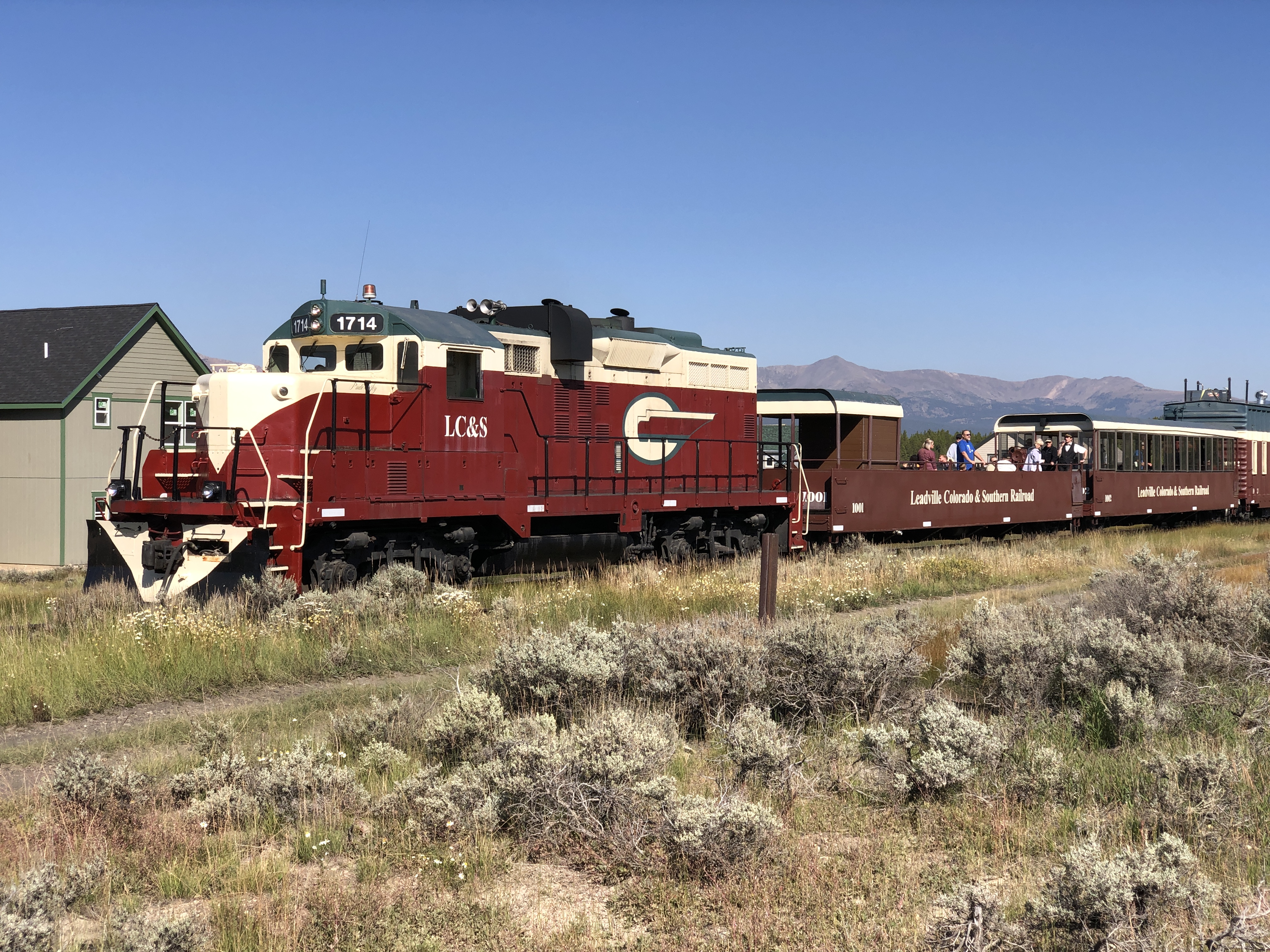
- Leadville, Colorado and Southern RR tourist train

Overview
- Headquarters: 326 East 7th Street, Leadville, Colorado 80461, United States.
- Dates of operation: 1988–current

Technical
- Track gauge: 4 ft 8 1/2 in (1,435 mm) standard gauge
- Previous gauge: pre-1934 narrow gauge 30 in
- Length: 14 miles
- Highest elevation: 10,200-10,800

Other
- Website: http://www.leadville-train.com/

The Leadville Railroad is a tourist railroad based in Leadville, Colorado, United States.

The Leadville Railroad has operated as a tourist Railroad in Leadville, Colorado since 1988. They operate year-round, offering both summer and winter train rides.

The line was established in 1884 by the Denver South Park and Pacific Railroad a subsidiary of the Union Pacific as a narrow-gauge passenger and freight line from the boom town of Leadville to Denver. After the bankruptcy in the late 1890s, the line was sold to the Leadville, Denver & Gunnison in 1898. It was later sold to the Colorado and Southern Railroad in 1909. It continued to operate from Leadville to Denver until 1934, when the line between Climax and Denver was abandoned, with only the Climax to Leadville section remaining. The line was converted to standard gauge in 1943 to allow for heavier freight service to Climax during WWII. During the 1980s recession, the Climax mine closed its doors, and the Burlington Northern Railroad sold the line to Ken Olsen for $10 in 1987, with the Leadville Colorado and Southern Railroad opening in 1988 as a tourist railroad.

== Roster ==
| Number | Image | Model | Built |
|---|---|---|---|
| 1714 | | EMD GP9 | 1955 |
| 1918 | | EMD GP9 | 1957 |
| 1889 | | EMD GP9 | 1959 |
| 1729 | | EMD GP9 | 1957 |
