= Ohi-Rail Corporation =

Train line railroad

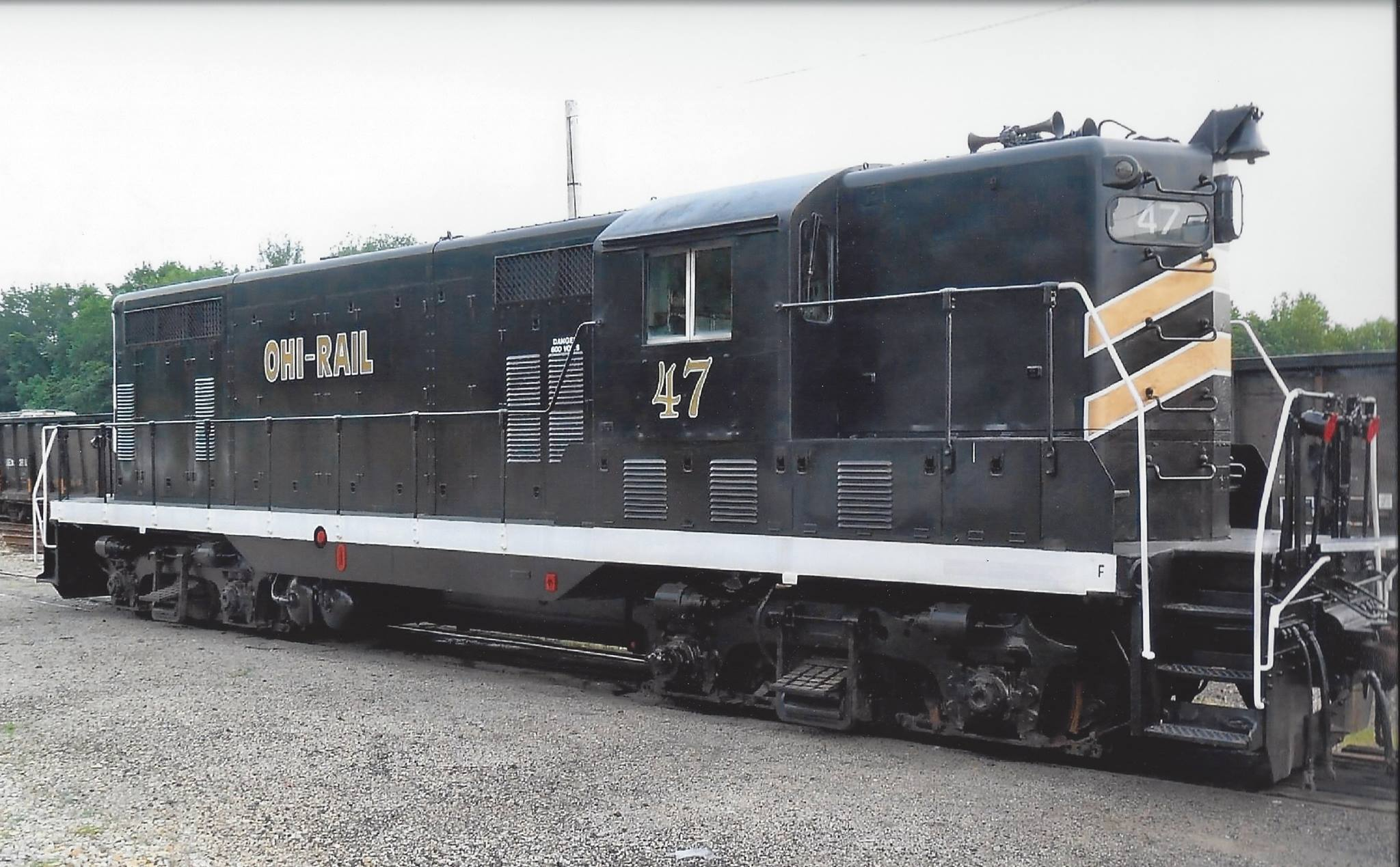
Engine #47

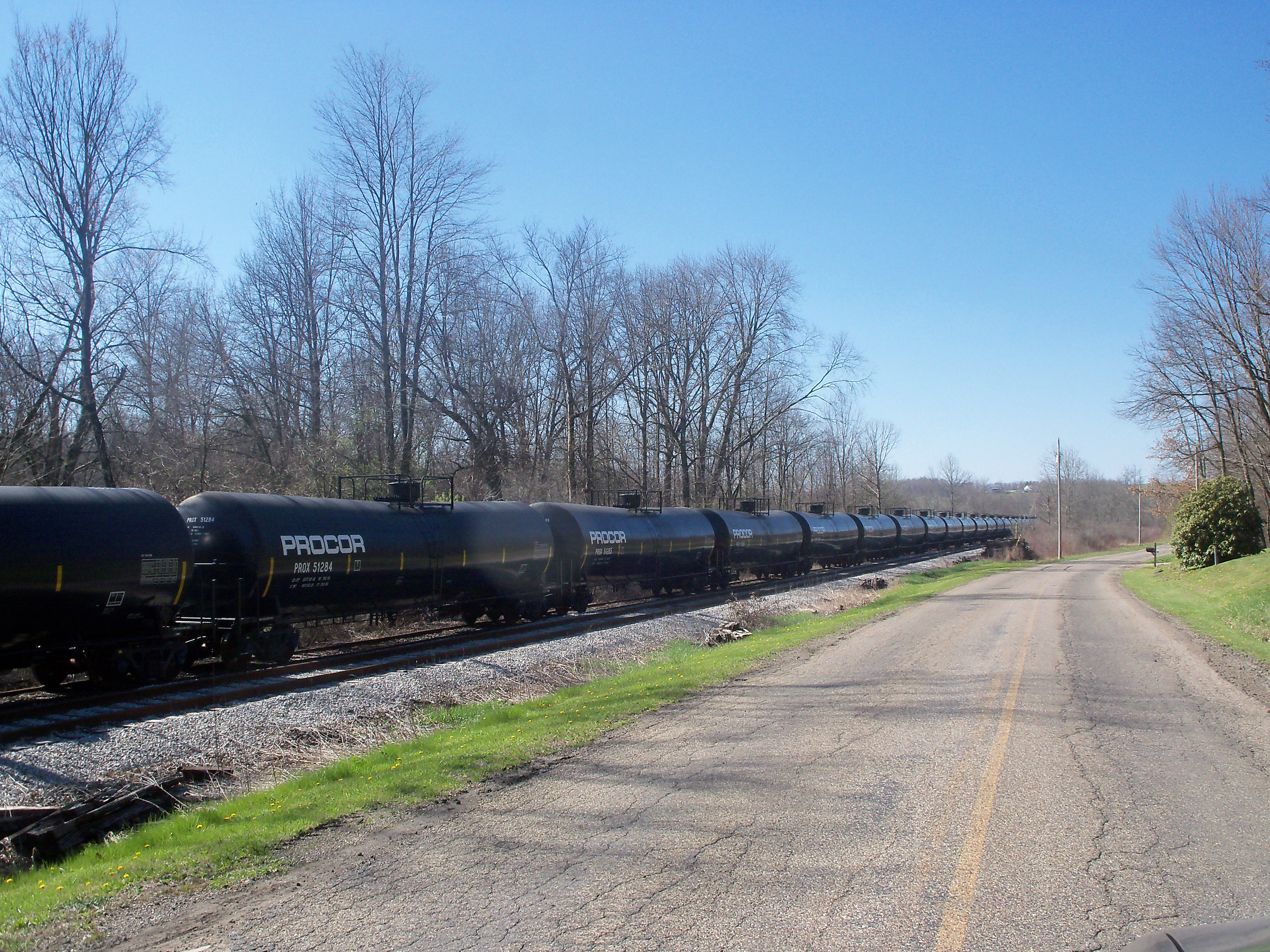
Tank cars parked near Augusta, Ohio

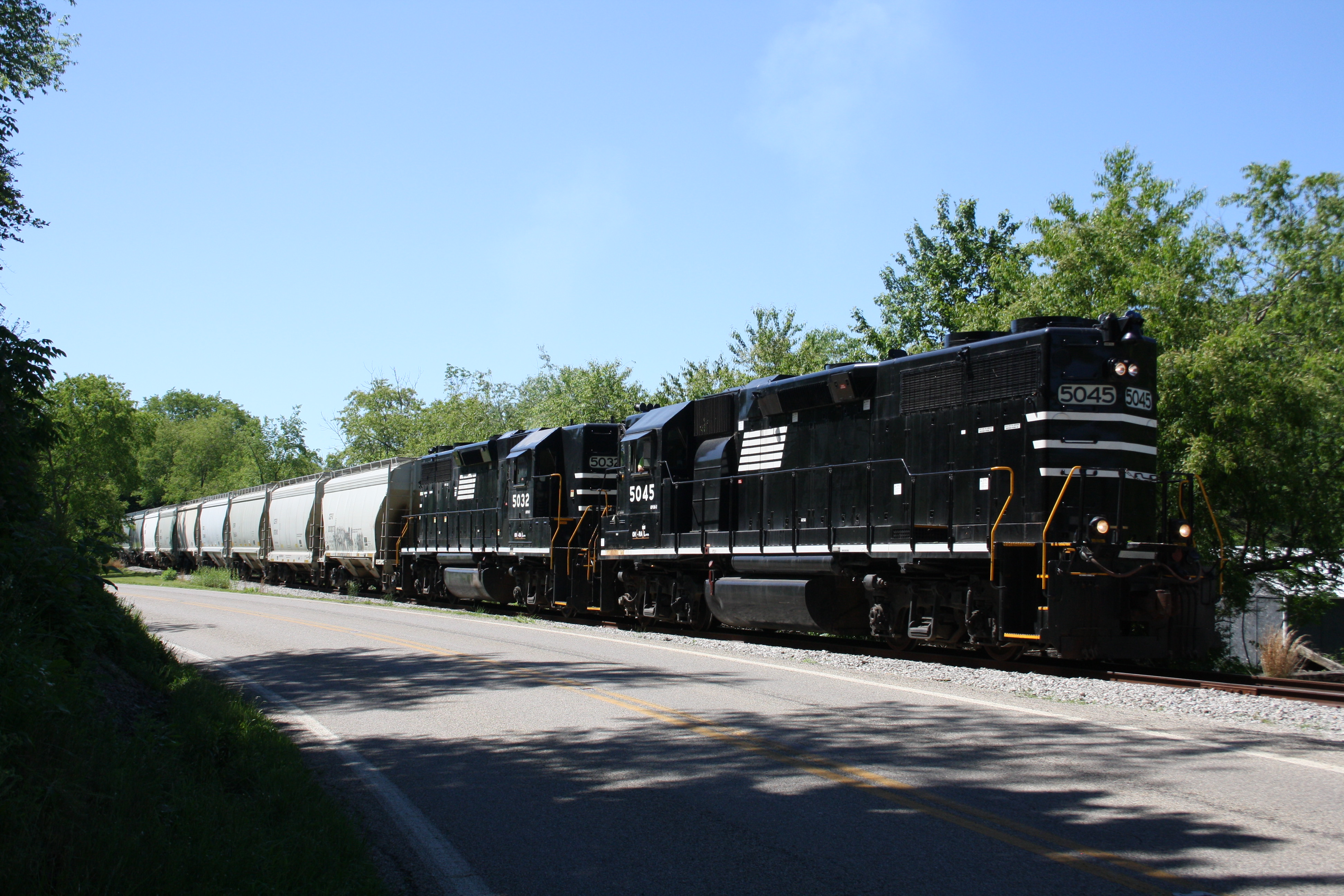
Ex-NS high hood GP38s at Wattsville

Ohi-Rail Corporation was a short line railroad that ran from Minerva, Ohio to Hopedale, Ohio, United States, with the reporting mark "OHIC". Interchanges were with Columbus and Ohio River Railroad, Norfolk Southern Railway, and Wheeling and Lake Erie Railway. In March 2020, operations were taken over by Genesee & Wyoming's Mahoning Valley Railway.

== History ==
Ohi-Rail Corporation traces its roots back to the predecessors of the New York Central System, who built the railroad to tap into the vast coal resources found in southeastern Ohio.

The 34-mile line stretches south from the City of Minerva through the counties of Carroll, Harrison and Jefferson to Hopedale in southeastern Ohio. Along with the 3.8-mile Wolf Run Branch, this railroad, commonly known as the "Piney Fork Line," cut a path through this coal-rich region of Ohio.

The rail line thrived by transporting coal well into the late 1960s. With the last two mines ceasing regular operations in the late 1970s, Penn Central moved to abandon and remove the track. Looking to preserve the line, the Ohio Department of Transportation’s Division of Rail Transportation Development purchased the Piney Fork Line and its associated track in July 1982 and began looking for an operator.

Ohi-Rail Corporation, a group of rail investors led by Orlando Guy and Teresa Schiappa stepped forward and signed an agreement with the ORDC to operate and preserve the Piney Fork Line. Ohi-Rail stepped up again in 1993 when Conrail decided to abandon Ohi-Rail's northern connection in Minerva. Ohi-Rail not only purchased the threatened line from Conrail, but also the additional track from Bayard into Minerva, including the Minerva Yard. In 2002, Ohi-Rail named Richard Delatore as Vice President.

With little traffic being generated on the railroad, Ohi-Rail made a living storing rail cars in the Minerva Yard until rumors of a new natural resource boom began circulating around the communities the railroad served.

Utica Shale then became the new lifeblood of the railroad, as wells using the latest technology in directional drilling and fracking methods began producing massive amounts of oil and natural gas liquids in the counties the railroad served. From pipe suppliers and frac sand distributors, to oil and gas liquids themselves, the railroad's business opportunities grew.

Ohi-Rail moved quickly, and when a major frac sand distributor located on the railroad in Minerva, the railroad completely rebuilt the Minerva Yard to accommodate the projected increase in traffic. At that time, they also brought General Manager Denny Varian on board to handle operations with the added value of his background in the rail industry. The main line is being completely rehabilitated from Minerva south to tap into the vast industrial property reserves along the line. Along with the sand cars in the railyard, tank cars are being filled with natural gas liquids via trans-loading from trucks.

After adding internal customer service and marketing departments headed by Desiree Dunlap and Sarah Ossman, the once coal-focused railroad is transforming itself to serve the energy development growth alongside other diverse industrial businesses in eastern Ohio.

In late 2019 and early 2020, a deal was made to sell Ohi-Rail Corporation to the Genesee and Wyoming as a part of the Ohio Central System under the OC's subsidiary name Mahoning Valley Railway. The north end of the line, which interchanges mostly with NS at Bayard, deals mostly with storage cars now. The last two Ohi-Rail rostered locomotives, GP38s 5032 and 5045, reside in Minerva as of June 2020. The south end has trash trains to and from Apex, and OC locomotives from the southern lines use this end, as the north end is now cut off with car storage.
