= Youngstown Belt Railroad =

Railway line in Ohio

Overview
- Headquarters: Youngstown, Ohio
- Reporting mark: YB
- Locale: Ohio
- Dates of operation: 1997–present

Technical
- Track gauge: 4 ft 8 1/2 in (1,435 mm) standard gauge

The Youngstown Belt Railroad (reporting mark YB) is a part of the Ohio Central Railroad System, which was bought by Genesee & Wyoming Inc. in 2008, serving the area northwest of Youngstown, Ohio. It began operations in 1997, mainly on ex-Erie Railroad trackage owned by the affiliated Warren and Trumbull Railroad (W&T), which acquired the "Lordstown Cluster" from Conrail in 1996. It also leases a short ex-Baltimore and Ohio Railroad segment from CSX Transportation, formerly operated by the W&T.

The company operates in three separate areas near Warren, Niles, and Youngstown, connected by trackage rights over the Norfolk Southern Railway. In addition to its connections with affiliated railroads – the Warren and Trumbull Railroad at Warren, Ohio and Youngstown and Austintown Railroad at Youngstown, Ohio – it interchanges in Youngstown, Ohio with Norfolk Southern at Youngstown, Ohio and with CSX at Ohio Junction. The track spans 5 miles and is rated for rail cars up to 286,000 pounds.

== History ==
The YB's trackage near Youngstown and Niles includes pieces of a former main line, completed in 1856 by the Cleveland and Mahoning Railroad, a predecessor of the Erie Railroad. Other ex-Erie trackage includes two branches to Leadville (connecting with the Youngstown and Austintown Railroad there) and the U.S. Steel Ohio Works, and the portion of the line at Warren north of the Warren and Trumbull Railroad junction (opened by the Atlantic and Great Western Railroad as part of a main line to Dayton in 1863). The remainder of the Warren line was opened in 1873 by the Ashtabula, Youngstown and Pittsburgh Railroad, a Pennsylvania Railroad predecessor. Conrail sold all of these lines to the Warren and Trumbull Railroad in 1996, and later that year the W&T leased a connecting ex-Baltimore and Ohio Railroad line near Youngstown from CSX Transportation. Effective January 1, 1997, the Youngstown Belt Railroad began operating this trackage under lease.
