= Youngstown and Austintown Railroad =

Railway line in Ohio

Overview
- Headquarters: Youngstown, Ohio
- Reporting mark: YARR
- Locale: Ohio

Technical
- Track gauge: 4 ft 8 1/2 in (1,435 mm) standard gauge

Youngstown and Austintown Railroad (reporting mark YARR) is a short-line railroad that operates just west of Youngstown, Ohio, United States, and was acquired by Genesee & Wyoming Inc. in 2008. It interchanges with the Youngstown Belt Railroad and Norfolk Southern in Youngstown, Ohio, as well as CSX in Yanda, Ohio. Acquired by Genesee & Wyoming in 2008, the Youngstown and Austintown Railroad spans across 5 miles of track and can accommodate rail cars up to 286,000 lbs. The YARR is essentially two former Erie Railroad branch lines. The line come together at M&T Jct. (near Meridian Road). The lines are very short and they service the steel industry in Youngstown. For years the largest customer on the YARR was Youngstown Steel Door and United Freezer Storage. The first operator of the YARR was Jerry Jacobson. The original YARR rostered an Alco switcher and former P&LE GP7 1501. The one-stall enginehouse still stands today in Austintown on Oakwood Ave. A small section of the structure was constructed by the Erie railroad.

The bridge over the Mahoning River, which connected the sections from the ex-Erie mainline to the Baltimore & Ohio Railroad at YANDA has been demolished and shows no signs of reconstruction. The end-of-track in Austintown has since been cut back to within the Austintown Industrial Park, north of RT 18.
