= Youngstown and Southeastern Railroad =

Railway line in the United States

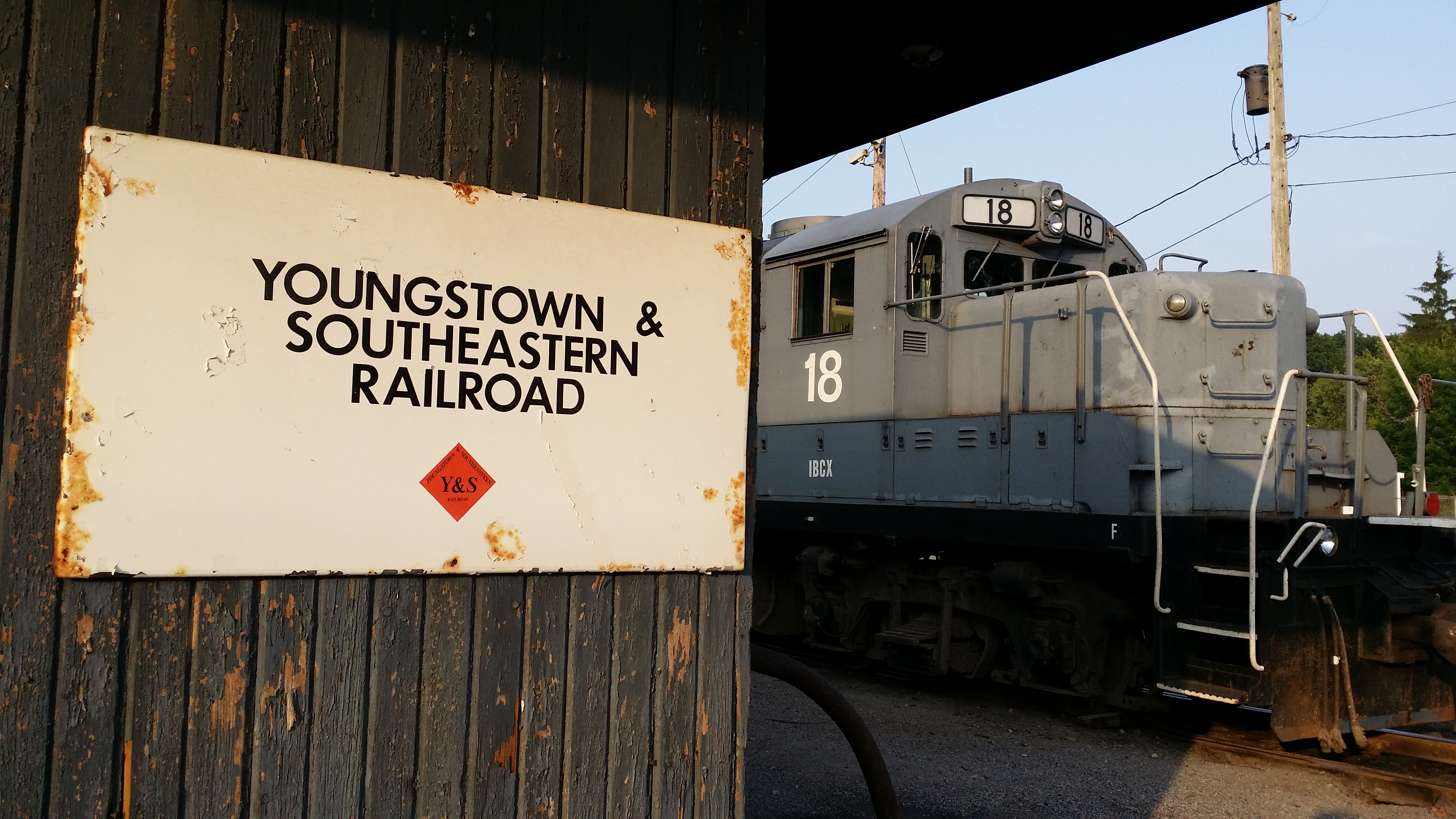

Overview
- Headquarters: Youngstown, Ohio, U.S.
- Reporting mark: YSRR
- Locale: Ohio and Pennsylvania
- Dates of operation: 2006–

Technical
- Track gauge: 4 ft 8 1/2 in (1,435 mm) standard gauge

The Youngstown and Southeastern Railroad (reporting mark YSRR) is a short-line railroad subsidiary of Midwest & Bluegrass Rail that operates freight trains between Youngstown, Ohio and Darlington, Pennsylvania, United States. The line is owned by the Midwest and BlueGrass Rail (MB Rail) operating as Youngstown & Southeastern Railroad, LLC, which acquired the line and its assets from Indiana Boxcar Corporation in 2019/2020 leased to the Eastern States Railroad, which is owned by the line's primary shipper, and contracted out to the YSRR. Freight is interchanged with CSX Transportation and the Norfolk Southern Railway at the Youngstown end.

The trackage was originally owned by the Youngstown and Southern Railway (reporting mark YS), which operated from 1904 to 1993, including a period as an electric interurban passenger railway between 1907 and 1948, being the last such line in Ohio. It was later jointly owned by the Pennsylvania Railroad and Pittsburgh and Lake Erie Railroad. After a local company bought the line in November 1996 and illegally closed it and blocked repairs, the line was out of service for almost five years until the Central Columbiana and Pennsylvania Railway (reporting mark CQPA) began operations in May 2001. Service under the YSRR name started in 2006, after the second of two less-than-two-year periods of operation by the Ohio Central Railroad System component Ohio and Pennsylvania Railroad (reporting mark OHPA) (the first was in 1995 and 1996). The Indiana Boxcar Corporation then owned the line until 2019.

== Line description ==
The YSRR begins in southern Youngstown, where it interchanges with CSX Transportation and the Norfolk Southern Railway adjacent to the Mahoning River. It heads northwest up the river bank and then curves southwest to climb a ravine to the highlands of Boardman Township. The original interurban line followed Front Street and South Avenue out of downtown and over the Mahoning River, then a private right-of-way between Wabash and Franklin Avenues, joining the present line just east of South Avenue. Beyond Boardman, the line continues through the highlands, crossing the Norfolk Southern Railway's Fort Wayne Line at Columbiana. As it approaches Signal, where it turns east, and the Pittsburgh, Lisbon and Western Railroad once continued west, it drops into the valley of the Little Bull Creek, which empties into Bull Creek before it reaches Negley. From that community, the Smiths Ferry Branch formerly extended south alongside the North Fork and main course of Little Beaver Creek, reaching the Ohio River at Smiths Ferry. The main line continues east from Negley, up the North Fork Little Beaver Creek valley into Pennsylvania, where it ends at Darlington. It formerly continued a short distance farther to the Fort Wayne Line at New Galilee.

== History ==
=== 20th century ===
The Youngstown and Southern Railway (Y&S) and Youngstown and Salem Railroad were both incorporated in May 1903, and the former absorbed the latter in October of that year. It began operations in 1904 as a 16-mile (26 km) steam line between Youngstown and Columbiana, and electrified the line with overhead wires in 1907, also extending it 3 miles (4.8 km) to Leetonia on the Youngstown and Ohio River Railroad (Y&OR) that year. In addition to carrying passengers as an interurban railway, the company handled freight, primarily coal from the electric Y&OR and the steam Pittsburgh, Lisbon and Western Railroad (PL&W). After the Y&S entered receivership in 1915, a 1916 reorganization produced the Youngstown and Suburban Railway.

In the late 1920s and early 1930s, Mahoning Valley industries and the Pittsburgh Coal Company attempted to build a new rail line between the Ohio River and Youngstown, claiming that the existing railroad connections (Pittsburgh and Lake Erie Railroad and Pennsylvania Railroad) refused to build suitable river transfer facilities. The Interstate Commerce Commission denied the application in exchange for the construction of these facilities. Later the coal company built a private railroad from the river at Smiths Ferry, Pennsylvania to the PL&W at Negley, Ohio, where it connected to Youngstown through control, by its Montour Railroad subsidiary, of the PL&W (New Galilee, Pennsylvania to Lisbon, Ohio) and Y&S (the latter acquired in 1928), and construction of a line between the PL&W at Signal and the Y&S at Columbiana. (The PL&W from Signal west to Lisbon was subsequently abandoned.) Large amounts of coal were shipped along the river from the mines to Smiths Ferry, and then over the rail line to Youngstown steel mills. The Y&S changed its name back to Youngstown and Southern Railway in 1944, and on January 1, 1945, it merged the PL&W into itself.

After World War II, the Consolidated Coal Company, successor to the Pittsburgh Coal Company, decided to sell its railroad properties to the Pennsylvania Railroad (PRR). The PRR agreed to purchase the Montour, and with it the Y&S, jointly with the Pittsburgh and Lake Erie Railroad (P&LE), a subsidiary of the New York Central Railroad (NYC). The two companies gained control on December 31, 1946, and simultaneously conveyed the private railroad south of Negley to the Y&S. Passenger service ended in 1948 on the Y&S, the last of Ohio's interurbans, and the Columbiana-Leetonia segment was abandoned that year, its connection to the Y&OR being long-gone. The eastern end of the old PL&W, from Darlington to New Galilee, was also abandoned then. By 1960 the Y&S had completely dieselized. After the Penn Central Transportation Company (successor to the NYC and PRR) declared bankruptcy in 1970, the newly independent profitable P&LE acquired full control of the Montour, and with it the Y&S.

The P&LE's finances declined with those of the steel industry in the 1980s, and CSX Transportation acquired its main lines in 1991 and 1992. The newly created PL&W Railroad (reporting mark PLW) began operating the Y&S under lease on May 1, 1993, and transferred the lease to the Ohio and Pennsylvania Railroad (O&P), a part of the Ohio Central Railroad System, on June 14, 1995. The Negley-Smiths Ferry line was abandoned in 1996, having gone at least two years without seeing a train, leaving only Youngstown-Darlington for the O&P to operate. The P&LE filed for Chapter 11 bankruptcy on March 22, 1996. When the O&P declined to purchase the leased trackage from the Y&S, the owner sold it to Railroad Ventures, Inc. (RVI) on November 8. RVI immediately, illegally, canceled the lease, forcing the O&P to issue an embargo, a process intended for a temporary cessation of service. After shippers complained, the federal Surface Transportation Board (STB) investigated, and the O&P and RVI negotiated a new lease agreement in early December. But only two weeks later, the line was washed out by flooding, and the O&P issued a second embargo on December 18.

RVI belatedly filed with the STB for authorization to purchase the line in January 1997, but it was rejected because RVI did not acknowledge its common carrier obligation and the Midwest & BlueGrass Rail alleged that RVI would not provide that service. A second filing in April was approved after RVI agreed to operate the line. RVI did not allow the CCPA to repair the line or carry out any repairs itself, instead filing for abandonment in January 1999 and again in May. CCPA submitted an offer of financial assistance to buy the line in September, and asked the STB to establish its value. The STB penalized RVI for its "blatant disregard of its common carrier obligation to provide service", including several sales and agreements it had made and kept secret. Only 20 days after purchasing the line in 1996, RVI had sold the "debris" (rail, ties, and ballast) to a scrap dealer. Later, in October 1999, RVI transferred subsurface and air rights to an affiliate, Venture Properties of Boardman, Inc. A November 1999 contract with Boardman Township required RVI's successor to pay for grade separations, and that month RVI sold a portion of the right-of-way to the Boardman Township Park District. During its ownership of the line, RVI had also allowed it to be paved over at grade crossings and for access to a shopping center partly owned by its CEO. The STB voided RVI's transfers, contracts, and agreements, and ordered RVI to sell the entire railroad property and pay for the necessary repairs. This too proved problematic, when RVI interfered with the escrow fund set up for this purpose, and the STB ordered the money transferred directly to the CCPA in November 2001.

=== 21st century ===
CCPA acquired the line from RVI on January 24, 2001, and the new Central Columbiana and Pennsylvania Railway, a subsidiary of Arkansas Short Line Railroads, Inc., began operations between Youngstown and Boardman Supply in Boardman Township on May 31. On August 31, the entire line was reopened when a CQPA train reached the end in Darlington. Although it had increased its business to serve 9 customers, the CQPA, and its parent Arkansas Short Line Railroads, suffered from cash flow problems, which limited its ability to make repairs to handle the increased traffic, and it filed for bankruptcy in June 2004. The Ohio and Pennsylvania Railroad resumed temporary operations in December 2004, but decided not to continue the lease upon the conclusion of the bankruptcy proceedings. Total Waste Logistics, the line's primary customer, formed the Eastern States Railroad and acquired the lease in November 2006. Simultaneously, the Eastern States Railroad contracted with the Indiana Boxcar Corporation, which created a new subsidiary, the Youngstown and Southeastern Railroad, to operate the line.

In 2000, when the Railroad Retirement Board (RRB) reconsidered its determination that RVI was an employer under the Railroad Retirement Act and Railroad Unemployment Insurance Act, it created a three-part test for deciding whether a non-operating lessor, which still retains the residual common-carrier obligation if the lessee ceases operations, is a covered employer. For the company to pass this "Railroad Ventures test", and therefore not be covered, the following must all be true:

1. The primary business purpose of the company is not to profit from railroad activities.
2. The company does not operate its line or retain that capacity.
3. The operator of the line is or would be a covered employer.

Since RVI's primary purpose was to profit from selling off the line, it failed the test. This was a departure from earlier decisions, which had cited a 1989 determination that the Board of Trustees of the Galveston Wharves was not a covered employer to declare any such non-operating company not covered. The test has been applied to declare, for example, the Eastern States Railroad not covered (since it was created to preserve service rather than to profit) and Pennsylvania Lines, LLC covered (since it was wholly owned by Conrail, a for-profit carrier, and thus presumed to be for-profit).

In 2019, Indiana Boxcar transferred their Youngstown and Southeastern Railroad to Midwest and Bluegrass Rail.
